= Swynford =

British Thoroughbred racehorse

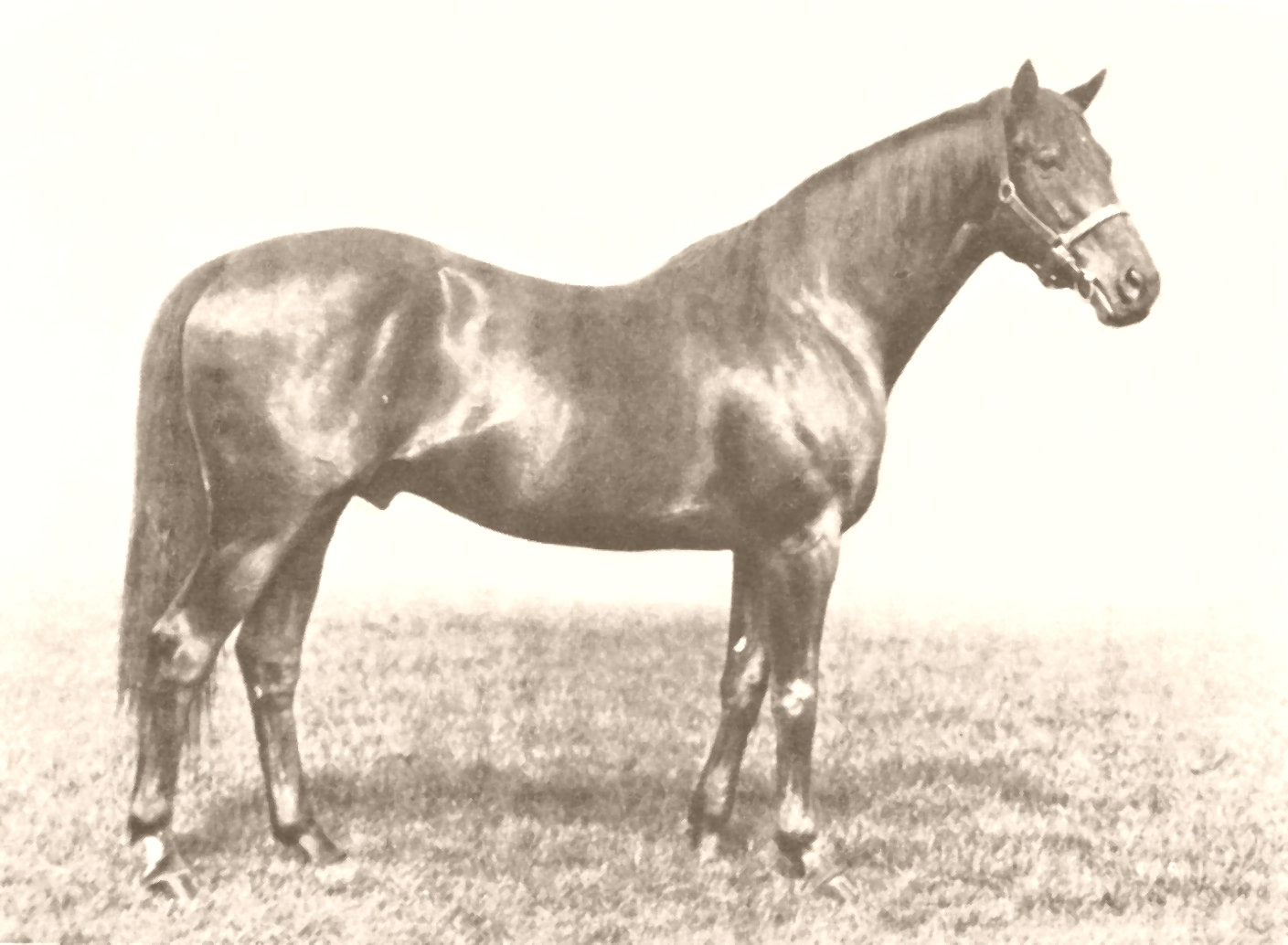
- Sire: John O'Gaunt
- Grandsire: Isinglass
- Dam: Canterbury Pilgrim
- Damsire: Tristan
- Sex: Stallion
- Foaled: 1907
- Country: Great Britain
- Colour: Brown
- Breeder: Frederick Stanley, 16th Earl of Derby
- Owner: 1) Frederick Stanley, 16th Earl of Derby; 2) Edward Stanley, 17th Earl of Derby (6/1908)
- Trainer: George Lambton
- Record: 12: 8–1–1
- Earnings: £25,508

Major wins
- Liverpool Summer Cup (1910); Hardwicke Stakes (1910, 1911); St. Leger Stakes (1910); Chippenham Plate (1911); Princess of Wales's Stakes (1911); Eclipse Stakes (1911)

Awards
- Leading sire in Great Britain and Ireland (1923); Leading broodmare sire in Britain & Ireland (1932)

Honours
- Swynford Stakes at Woodbine Racetrack
- Last updated on 13 November 2011

Swynford (January 1907 – 18 May 1928) was a British Thoroughbred racehorse. Bred at the 16th Lord Derby's stud in Lincolnshire, England he was sired by John O'Gaunt, a son of Isinglass, winner of the British Triple Crown in 1893. His dam was Lord Derby's foundation mare and 1896 Epsom Oaks winner Canterbury Pilgrim who also produced Chaucer, the 1927 and 1933 Leading broodmare sire in Great Britain & Ireland.

== Racing career ==
Lord Derby died in June 1908 and his son Edward took over the family's racing and breeding operations. Trained by George Lambton at the Stanley House Stables in Newmarket, Suffolk, Swynford was a difficult horse to handle and in his only start at age two ran unplaced. An injury kept him off the track until 1910 when he made his three-year-old debut in The Derby. He finished well back in the Derby after being struck in the leg by another runner. Following a third in the St. James's Palace Stakes at Ascot Racecourse, Swynford then won the first of two consecutive editions of Ascot's Hardwicke Stakes. The colt went on to win the Liverpool Summer Cup and the third leg of the British Triple Crown, the St. Leger Stakes, somewhat fortuitously since "half the racegoers in England declared... [the race] had been thrown away by Danny Meher on Lemberg"

Sent back to the track at age four, Swynford won the Chippenham Plate, Princess of Wales's Stakes, Eclipse Stakes and his second straight Hardwicke Stakes. In September 1911, he suffered a serious fetlock injury during training that almost ended his life. Saved by the work of a veterinarian, Swynford was retired to stud duty for Lord Derby where he would prove to be a very successful sire and a sire of leading sires.

== Stud record ==
Swynford was the Leading sire in Great Britain and Ireland in 1923 and the Leading broodmare sire in Great Britain and Ireland in 1932, Sywnford's progeny included six British Classic race winners and in 1923 he was the Leading sire in Great Britain and Ireland.

Among the notable horses Swynford sired were:

- Bettina – (1918) – 1,000 Guineas Stakes (1921)
- Blandford (1919) – Three-time Leading sire in Great Britain and Ireland (1934, 1935, 1938). Sired four Epsom Derby winners including the 1935 British Triple Crown winner, Bahram
- Ferry (1915) – won 1,000 Guineas Stakes (1918)
- Hainault (br. 1914)
- Keysoe (br. 1916) – St. Leger Stakes (1919)
- Tranquil (1920) – won 1,000 Guineas Stakes (1923), St. Leger Stakes (1923)
- Sansovino (1921) – won Epsom Derby (1924)
- St Germans (1921) – Leading sire in North America (1931). Sired U.S. Racing Hall of Fame inductee, Twenty Grand, Kentucky Derby and Preakness Stakes winner and outstanding sire, Bold Venture, and the 1943 & 1944 American Champion Older Male Horse, Devil Diver
- Frilford (1922) Port Adelaide Cup and Tatt's SA Tattersall's Cup
- Saucy Sue (1922) – won the 1,000 Guineas Stakes (1925), Epsom Oaks (1925)
- Challenger II (1927) – Leading sire in North America (1939). Sired U.S. Racing Hall of Fame inductees Challedon and Gallorette, plus the 1946 American Champion Three-Year-Old Filly, Bridal Flower.

Swynford was 21 years old when he died while at Woodlands Stud in Newmarket on 18 May 1928.

== Sire line tree ==
Descendants of Swynford (click to show)
- Swynford
  - Hainault
    - Haine
    - Simeons Fort
      - Hostile
      - Tuhitarata
    - Yeomanstown
  - Under Fire
    - Bagenbaggage
  - March Along
    - Lightning March
    - Safari
      - Enrich
  - Gauntley
  - Sirrah
  - Westward Ho
    - Norwest
      - Ivanhoe
  - Blandford
    - Athford
    - Buland
    - Buland Bala
      - Merin d'Or
    - Trigo
      - Chirgwin
      - Senor
      - Cornfield
      - Crushed Corn
      - Wheatland
      - Harvest Feast
      - Kerry Piper
    - Blenheim (1927)
      - Hilltown
        - Valdina Orphan
      - Pampeiro
        - Fedor
        - Orneiro
      - Barra Sahib
      - Mahmoud
        - Afghan
        - Flushing
        - Mehrali
        - Muzloom
        - Ahina
        - Ahriman
        - Fighting Chance
        - Romney
        - Royal Cheer
        - The Sultan
        - Bellwether
        - Distingue
        - Mahrhu
        - Olympic Zenith
        - Sabu
        - Alabama
        - Burra Peg
        - Greek Warrior
        - Greylord
        - Jeep
        - Desert Ration
        - Mahout
        - Mighty Story
        - Billings
        - Mount Marcy
        - Vulcan's Forge
        - Boodle
        - Mr Trouble
        - Oil Capitol
        - General Staff
        - Mameluke
        - Silver Wings
        - Yildiz
        - Fort Salonga
        - Moolah Bux
        - Cohoes
        - The Axe
      - Vermeil
      - Wyndham
        - First Night
        - Garrick
        - Windy City
      - Bidar
        - ESB
      - Chenonceaux
      - Donatello
        - Bleneran
        - Marble Faun
        - Simone da Bologna
        - Orestes
        - The Chiseller
        - Good Company
        - Alycidon
        - Supertello
        - Wellmead
        - Herculaneum
        - Acropolis
        - Crepello
        - Martini
        - Dimitri
      - Drap d'Or
      - Le Grand Duc
        - Mokany Legeny
        - Monmouth
        - Flying Duke
        - Iron Duke
        - Aristocrat
      - Domenico Ghirlandaio
        - Ermellino
        - Val Sandro
      - Khan Bahadur
        - Adalid
        - Aladin
        - Bahadur Fair
        - Byland
      - Mirza
        - Saint Amour
        - Baksishi
        - Northern Star
        - Punto Fijo
      - Hastings
      - Tramail
      - Benagi
      - Moradabad
      - War Lord
        - Guerrier
        - Gallant Duke
        - Sir Blenheim
      - Whirlaway
        - Dart By
        - Whirling Fox
        - Whirling Bat
        - Kurun
      - Blandisher
      - Ramillies
      - Star Beacon
      - Thumbs Up
        - Selector
        - Lion
        - Jampol
      - Ocean Wave
      - Star Blen
      - Big V
      - Blenban
      - Hail Victory
        - Snowbound
      - Air Hero
      - Cientifico
      - Fervent
        - Rockcastle
      - Jet Pilot
        - Jet Jewel
        - Jet Master
        - Jet's Date
        - Smart Apple
        - Jet Action
        - Jet General
        - Pilot
      - Fly Away
      - Free America
        - Correlation
      - Bryan G
        - Sayil
      - Battle Morn
        - Warhead
      - Adaptable
      - Alate
      - Quick Lunch
      - Saratoga
    - Blue Skies
      - Blue Tzar
        - Cote d'Or
      - Galene
        - Magnetron
        - Makalu
    - Filarete
      - Blocus
      - Bouquet
      - Gitanillo
      - Indauchu
      - Tarsis
      - Luanco
    - Golden Grace
    - Blenheim (1928)
      - Blensign
    - Unlikely
    - Bulandshar
      - High Castle
        - Prince Kerdieil
      - Lambourn
      - Baroda
      - Nizam
      - Expanse
      - Nawab
      - Buhtan
      - Foxshar
      - Tesla
    - Electron
    - Royal Dancer
      - Quinto
        - Berere
      - Hariform
      - The Miller
    - Harinero
      - Mercator
      - Skip Bomber
      - Chaytor
    - Madagascar
    - Statesman
      - Ibukiyama
    - Badruddin
      - Loliondo
      - Boabdil
      - Bhopal
      - Blackamoor
        - Bizancio
        - Ubaibas
        - Surriento
      - Burudun
        - Branding
      - Biscailuz
      - Beaupre
        - Tranquilo
    - Bahrein
      - Bajazit
      - Bohem
      - Bombardon
      - Bims
    - Blanding
      - Tipots
    - Blazonry
    - Brantome
      - Abbe Pierre
      - Ludovic Le More
        - El Krim
      - Breughel
      - Caldarium
        - Frascati
        - Romantisme
        - Hidalgo
        - Antony
        - Launay
        - Caldova
        - Calta
        - Trac
      - Triboulet
      - Pensbury
      - Vieux Manoir
        - Le Haar
        - Mon Manoir
        - Mourne
        - Cherasco
        - Coup de Canon
        - San Roman
        - Grand Shelem
        - Adoneo
        - Vik
        - Tang
        - Val de Loir
        - Gai Logis
        - Michelozzo
      - Couquelin
      - Dragon Blanc
        - Always
        - Good Will
    - Primero
      - Rockford
      - Minami Homare
        - Blue Homare
        - Golden Wave
        - Daigo Homare
      - Tobisakura
        - Hakuchikara
      - Asafuji
      - Azumarai
      - Shimataka
        - Koma Hikari
      - Kane Fubuki
      - Hoshu
      - Tachikaze
      - Tosa Midori
        - Kitano O
        - Komatsu Hikari
        - Kitano Oza
        - Hirokimi
      - Kumono Hana
      - Kurinohana
        - Kuripero
        - Takamagahara
      - Hakuryo
        - Yamano O
      - Yashima Manna
      - Kegon
      - Kenshun
      - Yashifusa
      - Katsura Shuho
    - Solicitor General
      - Pleading
    - Starford
    - Stormy Weather
    - Sunderland
      - Splendid
    - Umidwar
      - Burhan Ali
        - Freedom
      - Ujiji
        - Don Canuto
      - Umballa
        - Eugenio
      - Norseman
        - Highlander
        - Ksarinor
        - Free Man
        - Norman
        - Nordiste
        - Norsemour
        - Arabian
        - Montaval
        - Lofoten
        - Cocomel
        - Adamastor
      - Recherche
        - Raca
        - Riu Kiu
      - Ultimate
      - Anwar
        - Sandwichman
      - Arbel
        - Birum
      - Eboo
        - Morumbi
        - Old Parr
        - Zaluar
      - Knock Out
      - Holmbush
      - Premi
      - Hervine
        - Blue Haven
        - Our Select
      - Creole War
      - Umberto
        - Dromoland
    - Windsor Lad
      - King Hal
        - Mill House
      - Bakhtawar
      - Windsor Slipper
        - Dublin Town
        - Lucky Bag
        - Royal Barge
        - Jai Mahal
        - Solar Slipper
        - The Cobbler
        - Castleton
        - Windsor Serial
      - Happy Landing
    - Bahram
      - The Druid
        - Rutilante
        - Big Red
        - El Gaucho
        - Luchador
      - Turkhan
        - Isfahan
        - Turkish Prince
        - Turk's Reliance
      - Big Game
        - Combat
        - Murrayfield
        - Stockade
        - Yoyo
        - Henley-In-Arden
        - Hunter's Moon
        - Nebris
        - Bear Dance
        - Bobo
        - Faux Tirage
        - Gigantic
        - Makarpura
        - Tembu
        - War Game
        - Jungle King
        - Khorassan
        - King's Command
        - Cannon Game
        - Game Law
        - Master Bowman
        - Good Shot
        - Big Burn
        - Masai King
        - Border Chief
        - Moon Game
        - Rally
        - Head Hunter
        - Bellagioca
      - Birikan
        - Umm
        - Bolivar
      - Hern The Hunter
      - Shah Rookh
      - Babershah
      - Baman
        - Bantam
        - Bucentauro
      - Brehon Law
        - Jabato
        - Pumba
        - Murillo
        - Naranco
        - Narrichkin
      - Persian Gulf
        - Abadan
        - Khor-Mousa
        - Papayer
        - Arab Legion
        - Arabian Night
        - Zarathustra
        - Tamerlane
        - Clarification
        - Rustam
        - Zimone
        - Agreement
        - Rhythmic Light
        - Persian Road
        - Restoration
        - Parthia
        - Istanbul
        - Proud Chieftain
        - Persian Lancer
        - Perspex
        - Idle Hour
        - Persian Wonder
        - Beau Persan
        - Gulf Pearl
        - Persian War
        - Cornelscourt
        - Shogun
      - Rangoon
      - Treasure Hunt
        - Regal Diamond
      - Whirlaway
        - Alister
      - Bois de Rose
        - Idlewild
      - Fair Aim
      - Super Duper
      - Cedar Creek
      - Stud Poker
      - Manchac
      - Yankee Hill
      - Basis
      - Stone Age
      - Sun Bahram
      - Bahram Son
        - Puerto Rico
      - His Honour
        - His Boy
      - Baxar
        - Bonete
      - Naranjal
      - Ravel
      - Hold On
        - Lepanto
      - Manipour
      - Avro
      - Senegal
        - Antar
    - Bokbul
    - Chivalry
      - Escondrijo
    - Conspirator
      - Cordale
    - Desert Cloud
    - Duke John
      - High Title
    - Hindoo Holiday
    - Lord Paramount
    - North Wales
    - Puits D'Amour
      - Le Pampre
      - Rigolo
        - Primesautier
        - Uniprix
    - September Errand
    - Baber Shah
      - Ben Omar
      - Zorro
    - Baffles
      - Sylis
    - Bala Hissar
      - El Greco
    - Blandonian
    - Broifort
      - Furioso
      - Broie Martia
        - Whiti Te Ra
    - His Grace
      - Vanquish
      - His Nickel
        - Nickel Boy
      - Jovial Jurur
      - Olein's Grace
      - Rumpelstilskin
    - Isolater
      - Isology
      - Lone Eagle
      - Big Ike
    - Malplaquet
    - Midstream
      - Murray Stream
      - Shannon
        - County Clare
        - Sea O Erin
        - Clem
      - Concerto
      - Lysander
      - Rio Fe
      - Bernbrook
      - Riptide
      - Delta
      - Bankstream
      - Careless
      - Deep River
      - Sea Sovereign
      - Royal Stream
      - Talisman
    - Ninth Duke
    - Rookwood
    - Blunderbuss
      - Four Ten
    - Boro Boudour
    - Dragonnade
      - Icy Calm
    - Berwick
    - Blandstar
    - Grano
    - Holywell
    - Old Radnor
      - Corsaire
    - Pasch
    - Pound Foolish
    - Rajah
    - Diadoque
    - Pigling Bland
  - Silurian
    - Santiago
    - Signum
    - Silfo
    - Similor
    - Sargazo
    - Siete Colores
  - Stratford
    - Charger
    - Seraph Boy
      - Solo Boy
      - Kim
      - Cato
      - TB
    - Diplomat
      - First Secretary
  - Bold And Bad
  - Top Gallant
  - Gallardo
  - Sansovino
    - Jacopo
      - Johake
      - Robert Morris
      - Rush Act
    - Sandwich
      - Anchois
    - Sans Crainte
      - Gaio
    - Portofino
      - Colonus
      - Attley
    - Sans Peine
    - Buckleigh
    - Sansofine
    - Shahali
    - Black Domino
    - Monument
    - St Magnus
      - St Fairy
      - San Martin
      - Star Knight
    - Snowfall
    - Faroe
  - St Germans
    - St Brideaux
      - Cherry Jam
    - Twenty Grand
    - Jungle King
    - The Darb
    - Carry Over
    - Rose Cross
    - Bold Venture
      - Depth Charge
        - Johnny Dial
        - Brigand
        - Chudej’s Black Gold
        - Dividend
        - Super Charge
        - Free Stride
        - The Haymaker
        - Tiny Charger
      - Assault
      - Middleground
      - Postillion
      - Nip And Tuck
    - Bim Bam
      - Fuego
    - The Rhymer
      - Tuscany
        - Tuscalee
      - Vertex
        - Cupid
        - Lucky Debonair
        - Top Knight
        - Tunex
        - Twogundan
        - Suncross
        - Impetuosity
        - Freetax
        - Vertee
    - Devil Diver
      - Call Over
      - Lotowhite
      - Crash Dive
      - Beau Diable
        - Dare Devil
  - Frilford
    - Frill Prince
  - Lulli
  - Schiavoni
  - Verbius
    - Fersen
  - Barbican
  - Lancegaye
    - Cavalcade
      - Dinner Party
    - Punch
    - War Lance
  - Swift And Sure
    - Eastport
    - Sir Marlboro
  - Swinburne
    - Swinfield
  - Birthright
    - Heirdom
  - Bolingbroke
    - Patriot King
    - The Old Pretender
    - Bimco
      - Teal
    - Rondo
  - Strathlaven
  - Hartford
  - Lyme Regis
  - Pick Of The Circus
  - Royal Ford
    - Heelfly
      - Yankee Valor
  - Challenger
    - Challedon
      - Donor
      - Shy Guy
      - Sabaean
      - Ancestor
    - Pictor
    - Vincentive
    - Challenge Me
    - Errard
      - Southharlington
      - Laffango
      - Errard King
    - Escadru
  - Iliad
    - Greek Shepherd
    - Homer
    - Plato

== Pedigree ==
Pedigree of Swynford (GB), brown stallion, 1907
Sire John O'Gaunt 1901	Isinglass; 1890	Isonomy	Sterling
Sire John O'Gaunt 1901	Isinglass; 1890	Isonomy	Isola Bella*
Sire John O'Gaunt 1901	Isinglass; 1890	Dead Lock	Wenlock
Sire John O'Gaunt 1901	Isinglass; 1890	Dead Lock	Malpractice
Sire John O'Gaunt 1901	La Fleche; 1889	St Simon	Galopin
Sire John O'Gaunt 1901	La Fleche; 1889	St Simon	St Angela
Sire John O'Gaunt 1901	La Fleche; 1889	Quiver	Toxophilite
Sire John O'Gaunt 1901	La Fleche; 1889	Quiver	Young Melbourne Mare
Dam Canterbury Pilgrim 1893	Tristan; 1878	Hermit	Newminster
Dam Canterbury Pilgrim 1893	Tristan; 1878	Hermit	Seclusion
Dam Canterbury Pilgrim 1893	Tristan; 1878	Thrift	Stockwell*
Dam Canterbury Pilgrim 1893	Tristan; 1878	Thrift	Braxey
Dam Canterbury Pilgrim 1893	Pilgrimage; 1875	The Palmer	Beadsman
Dam Canterbury Pilgrim 1893	Pilgrimage; 1875	The Palmer	Madame Eglentine
Dam Canterbury Pilgrim 1893	Pilgrimage; 1875	Lady Audley	Macaroni
Dam Canterbury Pilgrim 1893	Pilgrimage; 1875	Lady Audley	Secret (Family 1-g)

* Swynford is inbred 5S x 4D to the stallion Stockwell, meaning that he appears fifth generation (via Isola Bella) on the sire side of his pedigree, and fourth generation on the dam side of his pedigree.
