= Homeward Bound (horse) =

British-bred Thoroughbred racehorse

- Racing silks of Foster Robinson
- Sire: Alycidon
- Grandsire: Donatello
- Dam: Sabie River
- Damsire: Signal Light
- Sex: Mare
- Foaled: 1961
- Country: United Kingdom
- Colour: Chestnut
- Breeder: Foster Robinson
- Owner: Foster Robinson
- Trainer: John Oxley
- Record: 9: 3-1-1
- Earnings: £42,243

Major wins
- Princess Elizabeth Stakes (1964); Epsom Oaks (1964); Yorkshire Oaks (1964)

Awards
- Timeform rating 126 (1964)

Homeward Bound (1961 – after 1982) was a British Thoroughbred racehorse and broodmare. After finishing unplaced on her only appearance as a juvenile she emerged as a top class performer in the following year, winning the Princess Elizabeth Stakes, Epsom Oaks and Yorkshire Oaks. She never won again but was placed in both the Coronation Cup and the Doncaster Cup as a four year old. After her retirement from racing she became a broodmare and had some success as a dam of winners.

== Background ==
Homeward Bound was a "lightly-framed" chestnut mare with a small white star bred by her owner Foster Robinson at his Wicken Parn Stud near Wolverton in Buckinghamshire. She was sent into training with John Oxley at his Hurworth House stable in Newmarket, Suffolk.

Homeward Bound was sired by Alycidon, an outstanding stayer who suffered from low fertility as a breeding stallion but sired several top class performers including Alcide and Twilight Alley. Her dam Sabie River won four races and produced several other winners. Sabie River's dam Amorcille was a half-sister to Discord, the female-line ancestor of Mr Dinos. Both Alycidon and Sabie River died in 1963, before Homeward Bound had appeared on the track.

== Racing career ==
=== 1963: two-year-old season ===
Homeward Bound was slow to mature and did not appear until October, when she finished unplaced in the Alington Stakes at Newmarket Racecourse.

=== 1964: three-year-old season ===
On her first start of her second campaign, Homeward Bound contested the Princess Elizabeth Stakes over one mile at Epsom Racecourse in April and won from Feather Bed and Rose Rock. The filly was then moved upin distance for the 186th running of the Oaks at the same track on 5 June in which she started at odds of 100/7 (14/1) in an eighteen-runner field. The Irish filly Patti started the 3/1 favourite ahead of Beaufront and Arnica. Ridden by the talented but eccentric jockey Greville Starkey Homeward Bound won by two lengths from Windmill Girl with La Bamba a neck away in third. The form of the race was subsequently franked when Windmill Girl won the Ribblesdale Stakes and La Bamba took the Prix Jacques le Marois.

After a break of two and a half months, Homeward Bound returned in the Yorkshire Oaks at York Racecourse in August when she was matched against the Irish Oaks winner Ancasta. With Starkey again in the saddle, she started at odds of 2/1 and won from Beaufront with Ancasta in third place. On her final appearance of the season she was sent to France for the Prix Vermeille over 2400 metres at Longchamp Racecourse in September but ran poorly and finished unplaced behind Astaria.

=== 1965: four-year-old season ===
Homeward Bound failed to win as a four-year-old but ran well against male opposition in at least two of her starts. In June she returned to the scene of her Oaks victory for the Coronation Cup at Epsom and came home third behind Oncidium and Soderini. After a lengthy break she returned in September for the Doncaster Cup over two and a quarter miles and finished second to Prince Hansel.

== Breeding record ==
At the end of her racing career Homeward Bound was retired to become a broodmare for her owner's stud. When Foster Robinson died in 1967 the mare was auctioned and exported to the United States. She produced twelve foals and five winners:

- Prime Abord, a brown filly, foaled in 1967, sired by Primera. She was born with a club foot and was reportedly bought by Nelson Bunker Hunt only because his agents visited the farm during a snowstorm and failed to notice the deformity. She nevertheless became a successful racehorse and broodmare who won the Prix de Royallieu and whose foals included Super Concorde.
- Lucky Traveler, bay filly, 1968, by Derring-Do. Won seven races including the Test Stakes.
- Faithful Son, chestnut colt, 1969, by Graustark
- Beaufort Sea, chestnut colt, 1970, by Nashua. Won two races.
- Aeropasser, bay colt, 1972, by Buckpasser. Unraced.
- Redstart, chestnut filly, 1973, by Raise A Native. Unraced.
- After the Flag, bay filly, 1974, by Hoist the Flag. Won one race.
- Aluminum, bay or brown colt, 1975, by Hail to Reason. Unraced.
- Swift Swallow, bay colt, 1977, by Northern Dancer. Unraced
- Ilheus, chestnut colt, 1978, by Northern Dancer. Unraced.
- Magellan, chestnut colt, 1981, by Master Derby. Won 11 races from 99 starts.
- A Far, chestnut filly, 1982, by Vaguely Noble. Failed to win in three races.

== Assessment and honours ==
In 1964 Homeward Bound was given a rating of 126 by the independent Timeform organisation, making her three pounds inferior to La Bamba who was their top-rated three-year-old filly. In their book, A Century of Champions, based on the Timeform rating system, John Randall and Tony Morris rated Homeward Board an "average" winner of the Oaks.

== Pedigree ==
Pedigree of Homeward Bound (GB), chestnut mare, 1961
Sire Alycidon (GB) 1945	Donatello (FR); 1934	Blenheim	Blandford
Sire Alycidon (GB) 1945	Donatello (FR); 1934	Blenheim	Malva
Sire Alycidon (GB) 1945	Donatello (FR); 1934	Delleana	Clarissimus
Sire Alycidon (GB) 1945	Donatello (FR); 1934	Delleana	Duccia di Buoninsegna
Sire Alycidon (GB) 1945	Aurora (GB); 1936	Hyperion	Gainsborough
Sire Alycidon (GB) 1945	Aurora (GB); 1936	Hyperion	Selene
Sire Alycidon (GB) 1945	Aurora (GB); 1936	Rose Red	Swynford
Sire Alycidon (GB) 1945	Aurora (GB); 1936	Rose Red	Marchetta
Dam Sabie River (IRE) 1949	Signal Light (IRE); 1936	Pharos	Phalaris
Dam Sabie River (IRE) 1949	Signal Light (IRE); 1936	Pharos	Scapa Flow
Dam Sabie River (IRE) 1949	Signal Light (IRE); 1936	Ensoleillee	Sunstar
Dam Sabie River (IRE) 1949	Signal Light (IRE); 1936	Ensoleillee	Laughter
Dam Sabie River (IRE) 1949	Amorcille (IRE); 1941	Columcille	Foxlaw
Dam Sabie River (IRE) 1949	Amorcille (IRE); 1941	Columcille	Movilla
Dam Sabie River (IRE) 1949	Amorcille (IRE); 1941	Amorelle	Volta
Dam Sabie River (IRE) 1949	Amorcille (IRE); 1941	Amorelle	Amanthe (Family 3-l)
