= Blandford (horse) =

Irish-bred Thoroughbred racehorse

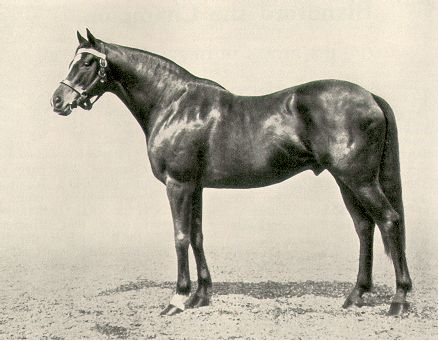
- Sire: Swynford
- Grandsire: John O'Gaunt
- Dam: Blanche
- Damsire: White Eagle
- Sex: Stallion
- Foaled: 1919
- Died: 1935 (aged 15–16)
- Country: Ireland
- Colour: Brown
- Breeder: Irish National Stud
- Owner: Samuel C. Dawson & Richard C. Dawson
- Trainer: Richard C. Dawson
- Record: 4: 3-1-0
- Earnings: not found

Major wins
- Princess of Wales's Stakes (1922)

Awards
- Leading sire in Great Britain & Ireland (1934, 1935, 1938); Leading sire in France (1935)

Honours
- Blandford Stakes at Curragh Racecourse
- Last updated on 7 June 2011

Blandford (1919–1935) was an Irish-bred Thoroughbred racehorse best known as the three-time Leading sire in Great Britain & Ireland who sired eleven British Classic Race winners including four which won The Derby. He was the Leading sire in France and also in England in the same year.

He was bred by the Irish National Stud at Tully. Blandford had pneumonia as a foal and was not ready for the early sale, but was later offered at the December Newmarket Sale where he sold for 720 guineas ro Messrs. RC & SC Dawson.

== Race record ==
Trained by co-owner Dick Dawson, Blandford raced only four times in his career. At age two he ran second in the Windsor Castle Stakes at Ascot Racecourse and at three won the Princess of Wales's Stakes. Bad forelegs, inherited from his grandsire, John O'Gaunt, limited Blandford's career to four starts.

== Stud record ==
When he was retired to stud he initially stood at a fee of £149 which was later raised to 400 guineas. During 1924 his progeny earned £70,510.

According to Thoroughbred Heritage, at stud Blandford proved to be one of the great sires of the English turf. Among his offspring were:

| Foaled | Name | Sex | Major Wins/Achievements |
|---|---|---|---|
| 1926 | Trigo | Stallion | The Derby (1929), St Leger Stakes (1929), Irish St. Leger (1929) |
| 1927 | Blenheim | Stallion | The Derby (1930), Leading sire in North America (1941) |
| 1929 | Udaipur | Mare | The Oaks |
| 1930 | Midstream | Stallion | Leading sire in Australia |
| 1931 | Brantôme | Stallion | Prix de l'Arc de Triomphe (1934) |
| 1931 | Campanula | Mare | 1000 Guineas Stakes |
| 1931 | Windsor Lad | Stallion | The Derby (1934), St Leger Stakes (1934), Coronation Cup (1935) |
| 1932 | Bahram | Stallion | English Triple Crown (1935) |
| 1933 | Harinero | Stallion | |
| 1935 | Pasch | Stallion | 2000 Guineas Stakes |

Blandford was still successfully breeding at Whatcombe Stables in Wantage, Oxfordshire when he died unexpectedly on 24 April 1935 at age sixteen. He is buried in Whatcombe's equine cemetery. Blandford sired the winners of 308 races worth £327,840 in England, plus overseas winners.

== Sire line tree ==
Descendants of Blandford (click to show)
- Blandford
  - Athford
  - Buland
  - Buland Bala
    - Merin d'Or
  - Trigo
    - Chirgwin
    - Senor
    - Cornfield
    - Crushed Corn
    - Wheatland
    - Harvest Feast
    - Kerry Piper
  - Blenheim (1927)
    - Hilltown
      - Valdina Orphan
    - Pampeiro
      - Fedor
      - Orneiro
    - Barra Sahib
    - Mahmoud
      - Afghan
        - Beauchef
        - Rey De Fracia
        - Fouquier
        - Gleeful
      - Flushing
        - Sub Factor
        - Star Rover
        - Atoll
      - Mehrali
      - Muzloom
      - Ahina
      - Ahriman
        - Good Nap
      - Fighting Chance
      - Romney
        - Homero
      - Royal Cheer
      - The Sultan
      - Bellwether
      - Distingue
      - Mahrhu
        - Skyrock
        - Sweet Mahrhu
      - Olympic Zenith
      - Sabu
      - Alabama
      - Burra Peg
      - Greek Warrior
      - Greylord
      - Jeep
      - Desert Ration
      - Mahout
      - Mighty Story
        - Mighty Mine
      - Billings
        - Midafternoon
      - Mount Marcy
        - Deerlands
      - Vulcan's Forge
      - Boodle
      - Mr Trouble
        - War Trouble
        - Aeroflint
      - Oil Capitol
        - Oil Wick
      - General Staff
      - Mameluke
      - Silver Wings
      - Yildiz
      - Fort Salonga
        - Sir Salonga
      - Moolah Bux
      - Cohoes
        - Quadrangle
        - Deck Hand
        - Shadow Brook
        - Cojak
      - The Axe
        - Poleax
        - Al Hattab
        - Executioner
        - Twist The Axe
        - Hatchet Man
        - My Friend Gus
        - Sawbones
        - Lucy's Axe
    - Vermeil
    - Wyndham
      - First Night
      - Garrick
      - Windy City
        - Old Pueblo
        - Tombstone
        - Restless Wind
        - Rick City
        - Windy Sea
        - City Line
    - Bidar
      - ESB
    - Chenonceaux
    - Donatello
      - Bleneran
      - Marble Faun
      - Simone da Bologna
      - Orestes
        - Kelling
        - Pylades
      - The Chiseller
        - Chajacito
      - Good Company
        - Dark Company
      - Alycidon
        - Alpenhorn
        - Alexander
        - Preamble
        - Alfidir
        - Alcimedes
        - Aleli
        - Ben Lomond
        - Lucidon
        - Alcide
        - All Serene
        - Lacydon
        - High Perch
        - Kalydon
        - Alcaeus
        - Agamenon
        - Cigal
        - Gaul
        - Grey Of Falloden
        - Twilight Alley
        - Idomeneo
        - Donato
        - Shy Boy
        - Khalekan
      - Supertello
        - Ayala
      - Wellmead
      - Herculaneum
      - Acropolis
        - Espresso
        - Vertigo
        - Carrack
        - Acrania
        - Mariner
        - Lemon Hart
        - Parthenon
        - Viani
        - Banco Divin
        - Baybird
      - Crepello
        - Credo
        - Crepes d'Enfer
        - Crepone
        - In The Gloaming
        - The Bo'sun
        - Crest Of The Wave
        - Crimea
        - Soderini
        - Indian Order
        - Kirsch Flambee
        - Orbit
        - Satinello
        - Busted
        - Herbaceous
        - Minera
        - Bright As Gold
        - Candy Cane
        - Crucible
        - Sugar Apple
        - Barrons Court
        - Calaboose
        - Carnival Night
        - New Chapter
        - Vervain
        - Cry Baby
        - Great Wall
        - Recalled
        - Caerdeon
        - Crepona
        - Linden Tree
        - Pentland Firth
        - Red Cross
        - Trusted
        - Clwyd
        - Perello
        - St Justin
      - Martini
      - Dimitri
        - Chianti
    - Drap d'Or
    - Le Grand Duc
      - Mokany Legeny
      - Monmouth
      - Flying Duke
      - Iron Duke
      - Aristocrat
    - Domenico Ghirlandaio
      - Ermellino
      - Val Sandro
    - Khan Bahadur
      - Adalid
      - Aladin
      - Bahadur Fair
      - Byland
        - Crown Law
    - Mirza
      - Saint Amour
        - Escorial
      - Baksishi
      - Northern Star
      - Punto Fijo
    - Hastings
    - Tramail
    - Benagi
    - Moradabad
    - War Lord
      - Guerrier
      - Gallant Duke
      - Sir Blenheim
    - Whirlaway
      - Dart By
      - Whirling Fox
      - Whirling Bat
      - Kurun
    - Blandisher
    - Ramillies
    - Star Beacon
    - Thumbs Up
      - Selector
      - Lion
      - Jampol
    - Ocean Wave
    - Star Blen
    - Big V
    - Blenban
    - Hail Victory
      - Snowbound
    - Air Hero
    - Cientifico
    - Fervent
      - Rockcastle
    - Jet Pilot
      - Jet Jewel
        - Jewel's Reward
        - Pollux
      - Jet Master
      - Jet's Date
      - Smart Apple
        - Fleet Apple
      - Jet Action
        - Hot Dust
        - Jolly Jet
      - Jet General
      - Pilot
    - Fly Away
    - Free America
      - Correlation
        - Mr Correlation
    - Bryan G
      - Sayil
    - Battle Morn
      - Warhead
    - Adaptable
    - Alate
    - Quick Lunch
    - Saratoga
  - Blue Skies
    - Blue Tzar
      - Cote d'Or
        - Lebon M L
        - Sexy
        - Le Conquerant
    - Galene
      - Magnetron
      - Makalu
  - Filarete
    - Blocus
    - Bouquet
    - Gitanillo
    - Indauchu
    - Tarsis
    - Luanco
  - Golden Grace
  - Blenheim (1928)
    - Blensign
  - Unlikely
  - Bulandshar
    - High Castle
      - Prince Kerdieil
    - Lambourn
    - Baroda
    - Nizam
    - Expanse
    - Nawab
    - Buhtan
    - Foxshar
    - Tesla
  - Electron
  - Royal Dancer
    - Quinto
      - Berere
    - Hariform
    - The Miller
  - Harinero
    - Mercator
    - Skip Bomber
    - Chaytor
  - Madagascar
  - Statesman
    - Ibukiyama
  - Badruddin
    - Loliondo
    - Boabdil
    - Bhopal
    - Blackamoor
      - Bizancio
      - Ubaibas
      - Surriento
    - Burudun
      - Branding
        - Cambur
        - Grace Born
    - Biscailuz
    - Beaupre
      - Tranquilo
  - Bahrein
    - Bajazit
    - Bohem
    - Bombardon
    - Bims
  - Blanding
    - Tipots
  - Blazonry
  - Brantome
    - Abbe Pierre
    - Ludovic Le More
      - El Krim
    - Breughel
    - Caldarium
      - Frascati
      - Romantisme
      - Hidalgo
      - Antony
      - Launay
      - Caldova
      - Calta
      - Trac
    - Triboulet
    - Pensbury
    - Vieux Manoir
      - Le Haar
        - Exbury
        - Duc de Gueldre
        - Veronese
        - Niksar
        - Trictrac
        - Agar
        - Frontal
        - Ramsin
        - Corps A Corps
      - Mon Manoir
        - Creation
      - Mourne
        - Snob
        - Frontin
        - Garde Coeur
        - Greyhound
        - Demi Deuil
        - Thataboy
        - Rock Roi
        - Galant Prince
        - My Mourne
        - Azorello
        - Rouser
      - Cherasco
      - Coup de Canon
      - San Roman
        - Tequendama
      - Grand Shelem
      - Adoneo
      - Vik
        - Zorba
      - Tang
        - Arnaldo
      - Val de Loir
        - Val d'Aoste
        - Beaugency
        - Chaparral
        - Nonancourt
        - Faldor
        - Ifniri
        - Tourangeau
        - Valdrague
        - Tourjours Pret
        - Stanleyville
        - Tennyson
        - Beauvallon
        - Thoreau
        - Olmeto
        - Val de l'Orne
        - Avaray
      - Gai Logis
      - Michelozzo
    - Couquelin
    - Dragon Blanc
      - Always
      - Good Will
  - Primero
    - Rockford
    - Minami Homare
      - Blue Homare
      - Golden Wave
        - Kawa Homare
      - Daigo Homare
    - Tobisakura
      - Hakuchikara
    - Asafuji
    - Azumarai
    - Shimataka
      - Koma Hikari
    - Kane Fubuki
    - Hoshu
    - Tachikaze
    - Tosa Midori
      - Kitano O
      - Komatsu Hikari
        - Meisei Hikari
      - Kitano Oza
      - Hirokimi
    - Kumono Hana
    - Kurinohana
      - Kuripero
      - Takamagahara
    - Hakuryo
      - Yamano O
    - Yashima Manna
    - Kegon
    - Kenshun
    - Yashifusa
    - Katsura Shuho
  - Solicitor General
    - Pleading
  - Starford
  - Stormy Weather
  - Sunderland
    - Splendid
  - Umidwar
    - Burhan Ali
      - Freedom
    - Ujiji
      - Don Canuto
    - Umballa
      - Eugenio
    - Norseman
      - Highlander
      - Ksarinor
      - Free Man
        - Mr Pickwick
        - Saint-Ange
        - Savarus
        - Free Ride
        - Maris
          - Uniformity
      - Norman
        - Nornad
        - Donald
          - Fantom
      - Nordiste
        - Michilimackinac
      - Norsemour
      - Arabian
        - Adar
        - Aray
        - Mr Magoo
        - Air Landais
      - Montaval
        - Khalife
        - Nasuno Kotobuki
        - Nihon Pillow Ace
      - Lofoten
      - Cocomel
      - Adamastor
    - Recherche
      - Raca
      - Riu Kiu
    - Ultimate
    - Anwar
      - Sandwichman
    - Arbel
      - Birum
    - Eboo
      - Morumbi
      - Old Parr
      - Zaluar
    - Knock Out
    - Holmbush
    - Premi
    - Hervine
      - Blue Haven
      - Our Select
    - Creole War
    - Umberto
      - Dromoland
  - Windsor Lad
    - King Hal
      - Mill House
    - Bakhtawar
    - Windsor Slipper
      - Dublin Town
      - Lucky Bag
        - Monte Carlo
      - Royal Barge
      - Jai Mahal
      - Solar Slipper
        - Cloonroughan
        - Panaslipper
        - State Trumpeter
        - Black Patch
        - Three Wells
        - Little Buskins
        - Pandofell
        - Solstice
      - The Cobbler
        - Hans Sachs
        - Gay Cobbler
      - Castleton
      - Windsor Serial
    - Happy Landing
  - Bahram
    - The Druid
      - Rutilante
      - Big Red
      - El Gaucho
        - Gauchesco
      - Luchador
    - Turkhan
      - Isfahan
        - Sir Isfahan
      - Turkish Prince
      - Turk's Reliance
        - Kazuyoshi
    - Big Game
      - Combat
        - Combustion
        - Aggressor
      - Murrayfield
      - Stockade
        - Teranyan
      - Yoyo
      - Henley-In-Arden
      - Hunter's Moon
      - Nebris
      - Bear Dance
      - Bobo
      - Faux Tirage
        - Hot Drop
        - Knave
        - Motueka
        - Seven Seas
        - Straight Draw
        - Amanullah
        - Rover
        - Tira Mink
        - Magician
        - Baraboo
        - Glensharold
        - Game
        - Hodmandod
        - Papillon
      - Gigantic
        - Red Crest
        - Royal Duty
        - Empyreus
        - Terrific
        - Mannix
        - Not Again
        - Town Beau
      - Makarpura
        - Best Blend
        - Little Roderick
      - Tembu
      - War Game
      - Jungle King
      - Khorassan
        - Coleridge
        - Melanion
        - Tulloch
        - Royal Khora
        - Baloo
        - Dardanus
      - King's Command
      - Cannon Game
      - Game Law
      - Master Bowman
      - Good Shot
      - Big Burn
        - Reynald
      - Masai King
      - Border Chief
      - Moon Game
        - Yootha
      - Rally
      - Head Hunter
        - Jan's Beau
        - Chimbu
      - Bellagioca
    - Birikan
      - Umm
      - Bolivar
    - Hern The Hunter
    - Shah Rookh
    - Babershah
    - Baman
      - Bantam
      - Bucentauro
    - Brehon Law
      - Jabato
      - Pumba
      - Murillo
      - Naranco
      - Narrichkin
    - Persian Gulf
      - Abadan
        - Jack Ketch
        - My Pal
      - Khor-Mousa
      - Papayer
        - Paradox
      - Arab Legion
      - Arabian Night
      - Zarathustra
        - Zaleucus
        - Crozier
      - Tamerlane
        - Eastern Nip
        - Final Problem
        - Indian Conquest
        - Marlon
        - Cassim
        - Flying Star
        - Lanesborough
        - Tambel
        - Tiger
        - Dschingis Khan
        - King's Lane
        - Young Turnabout
        - Tycoon
        - Streakie
        - Tamermarc
        - Origines
        - Alpenkonig
        - Eric
        - Eucalyptus
        - Tamil
        - Lane Court
        - Tamerino
        - Trainer's Seat
      - Clarification
        - Resolution
        - Top Rank
        - I'll Be There
      - Rustam
        - Talahasse
        - Double Jump
      - Zimone
        - Rockstone
        - Tanno
        - Caronte
        - Conte Zimon
        - Shank
      - Agreement
      - Rhythmic Light
      - Persian Road
      - Restoration
      - Parthia
        - Um Said
        - Djelo Binza
        - Greek God
        - Sloop
        - Fujino Parthia
        - Parthian Plain
      - Istanbul
        - Khalif
      - Proud Chieftain
        - House Proud
        - Owen Anthony
      - Persian Lancer
      - Perspex
      - Idle Hour
        - Figonero
        - Vincitore
        - Farley
      - Persian Wonder
        - Shah Abbas
        - Pedlar
        - Majestic Crown
        - Archangel
        - Mithra
        - Big Swinger
        - Great Sun
        - Supreme Charger
        - Ton Up
      - Beau Persan
      - Gulf Pearl
        - Deep Diver
        - Proof Positive
        - Portese
        - Sea Chimes
      - Persian War
      - Cornelscourt
        - Royale
      - Shogun
        - Shamrock
    - Rangoon
    - Treasure Hunt
      - Regal Diamond
    - Whirlaway
      - Alister
    - Bois de Rose
      - Idlewild
    - Fair Aim
    - Super Duper
    - Cedar Creek
    - Stud Poker
    - Manchac
    - Yankee Hill
    - Basis
    - Stone Age
    - Sun Bahram
    - Bahram Son
      - Puerto Rico
    - His Honour
      - His Boy
    - Baxar
      - Bonete
    - Naranjal
    - Ravel
    - Hold On
      - Lepanto
    - Manipour
    - Avro
    - Senegal
      - Antar
  - Bokbul
  - Chivalry
    - Escondrijo
  - Conspirator
    - Cordale
  - Desert Cloud
  - Duke John
    - High Title
  - Hindoo Holiday
  - Lord Paramount
  - North Wales
  - Puits D'Amour
    - Le Pampre
    - Rigolo
      - Primesautier
        - Ming
        - Navalcan
        - Terborch
      - Uniprix
  - September Errand
  - Baber Shah
    - Ben Omar
    - Zorro
  - Baffles
    - Sylis
  - Bala Hissar
    - El Greco
  - Blandonian
  - Broifort
    - Furioso
    - Broie Martia
      - Whiti Te Ra
  - His Grace
    - Vanquish
    - His Nickel
      - Nickel Boy
    - Jovial Jurur
    - Olein's Grace
    - Rumpelstilskin
  - Isolater
    - Isology
    - Lone Eagle
    - Big Ike
  - Malplaquet
  - Midstream
    - Murray Stream
    - Shannon
      - County Clare
      - Sea O Erin
      - Clem
        - Clem Pac
        - Acclimatization
    - Concerto
    - Lysander
    - Rio Fe
    - Bernbrook
    - Riptide
    - Delta
    - Bankstream
    - Careless
    - Deep River
    - Sea Sovereign
    - Royal Stream
    - Talisman
  - Ninth Duke
  - Rookwood
  - Blunderbuss
    - Four Ten
  - Boro Boudour
  - Dragonnade
    - Icy Calm
  - Berwick
  - Blandstar
  - Grano
  - Holywell
  - Old Radnor
    - Corsaire
  - Pasch
  - Pound Foolish
  - Rajah
  - Diadoque
  - Pigling Bland

== Pedigree ==
Pedigree of Blandford (GB), brown stallion, 1919
| Sire Swynford Black 1907 | John O'Gaunt; 1901 | Isinglass | Isonomy* |
| Sire Swynford Black 1907 | John O'Gaunt; 1901 | Isinglass | Deadlock |
| Sire Swynford Black 1907 | John O'Gaunt; 1901 | La Fleche | St Simon* |
| Sire Swynford Black 1907 | John O'Gaunt; 1901 | La Fleche | Quiver |
| Sire Swynford Black 1907 | Canterbury Pilgrim; Chestnut 1893 | Tristan | Hermit* |
| Sire Swynford Black 1907 | Canterbury Pilgrim; Chestnut 1893 | Tristan | Thrift |
| Sire Swynford Black 1907 | Canterbury Pilgrim; Chestnut 1893 | Pilgrimage | The Palmer |
| Sire Swynford Black 1907 | Canterbury Pilgrim; Chestnut 1893 | Pilgrimage | Lady Audley |
| Dam Blanche 1912 | White Eagle; Chestnut 1905 | Gallinule | Isonomy* |
| Dam Blanche 1912 | White Eagle; Chestnut 1905 | Gallinule | Moorhen* |
| Dam Blanche 1912 | White Eagle; Chestnut 1905 | Merry Gal | Galopin* |
| Dam Blanche 1912 | White Eagle; Chestnut 1905 | Merry Gal | Mary Seaton* |
| Dam Blanche 1912 | Black Cherry; 1892 | Bendigo | Ben Battle |
| Dam Blanche 1912 | Black Cherry; 1892 | Bendigo | Hasty Girl |
| Dam Blanche 1912 | Black Cherry; 1892 | Black Duchess | Galliard |
| Dam Blanche 1912 | Black Cherry; 1892 | Black Duchess | Black Corrie (Family:3-o) |

* Blandford is inbred 4S x 4D x 5D to the stallion Isonomy, meaning that he appears fourth generation on the sire side of his pedigree, and fourth generation and fifth generation (via Mary Seaton) on the dam side of his pedigree.

* Blandford is inbred 4S x 5D to the stallion Hermit, meaning that he appears fourth generation on the sire side of his pedigree, and fifth generation (via Moorhen) on the dam side of his pedigree.

* Blandford is inbred 5S x 4D to the stallion Galopin, meaning that he appears fifth generation (via St Simon) on the sire side of his pedigree, and fourth generation on the dam side of his pedigree.

== See also ==
- List of leading Thoroughbred racehorses
