= Blenheim (horse) =

British Thoroughbred racehorse

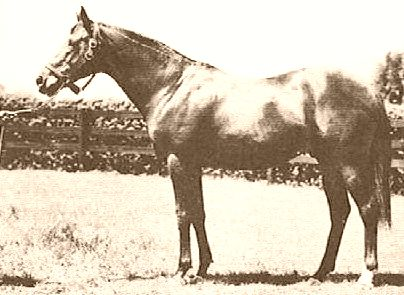
- Sire: Blandford
- Grandsire: Swynford
- Dam: Malva
- Damsire: Charles O'Malley
- Sex: Stallion
- Foaled: 1927
- Country: United Kingdom
- Colour: Brown
- Breeder: Henry Herbert, 6th Earl of Carnarvon
- Owner: Aga Khan III
- Trainer: Dick Dawson
- Record: 10: 5–3–0
- Earnings: £14,533

Major wins
- New Stakes (1929); Epsom Derby (1930)

Awards
- Leading sire in North America (1941)
- Last updated on 29 January 2010

Blenheim (1927–1958), also known as Blenheim II, was a British Thoroughbred race horse who won The Derby in 1930. As sire, he had a major influence on pedigrees around the world. Blenheim was highly tried, by European standards, as a two-year-old in 1929, winning four of his seven races. In the following season he was beaten in his first two races before recording an upset 18/1 win in the Derby. His racing career was ended by injury soon afterwards, and he was retired to stud, where he became an extremely successful and influential breeding stallion, both in Europe and North America.

== Background ==
Blenheim was a brown horse standing 15.3 hands high with a white star and a white sock on his left hind leg, bred by Henry Herbert, 6th Earl of Carnarvon at his Highclere stud. He was sired by the good sire Blandford, a three-time British champion sire, whose other progeny included Bahram, Brantome, Trigo, Pasch and Windsor Lad. Blenheim's dam, Malva (1919–1941) who stood barely 15 hands, won three minor races for Lord Carnarvon before becoming a highly successful broodmare. She was the dam of seven winners, including the Coronation Cup winners King Salmon (sire of Herringbone) and His Grace.

As a yearling, Blenheim was sold for 4,100 guineas to the Aga Khan. He was sent into training with Richard Dawson at his Whatcombe stables near Wantage in Oxfordshire.

== Race record ==
=== 1929: two-year-old season ===
Blenheim began his racing career in April 1929 when he won a £200 plate at Newbury Racecourse. He then finished second in the Stud Produce Stakes at Sandown and won the Speedy Plate at Windsor. He was then moved up in class to contest the New Stakes over five furlongs at Royal Ascot. Ridden by Dawson's stable jockey Michael Beary he started at odds of 7/2 and won from Lord Woolavington's Press Gang.

In autumn he finished second to Fair Diana in the Champagne Stakes and then won the Hopeful Stakes at Newmarket Racecourse. On his final race of the season he started favourite for the Middle Park Stakes but finished second by half a length to Press Gang. It was noted that Blenheim may have been feeling the effects of his "punishing" schedule. He ended the season with earnings of £4,497.

=== 1930: three-year-old season ===
Blenheim was slow to find his form as a three-year-old and began his 1930 campaign by running unplaced behind Christopher Robin in the Greenham Stakes at Newbury. Despite his poor performance in the trial, he was well-fancied for the 2000 Guineas at Newmarket two weeks later. He finished fourth of the twenty-eight runners behind Diolite, Paradine and Silver Flare.

A month later, Blenheim was moved up in distance to contest the Derby over one and a half miles at Epsom Downs Racecourse. Beary elected to ride the Aga Khan's more fancied runner Rustom Pasha, while the ride on Blenheim went to Harry Wragg, a jockey whose expertise at holding up horses for a late run had earned him the nickname "The Head Waiter". The race attracted its customary huge crowd, with the spectators including the King and Queen as well as the Prince of Wales and the Duke of York. Blenheim started an 18/1 outsider in a field of seventeen. Rustom Pasha led the field on the final turn but weakened and dropped away in the straight. Blenheim was produced by Wragg with a perfectly timed run to take the lead inside the final furlong and won by a length from Iliad with Diolite in third. After the race Wragg described the winner as "a lovely little horse" and explained that although he had only made very gradual progress in the second half of the race he had always been confident of victory.

After the Derby, Blenheim was being prepared or a run in the Eclipse Stakes when he sustained a tendon injury. He did not recover sufficiently to resume racing and was retired to stud.

== Assessment ==
In their book A Century of Champions, John Randall and Tony Morris rated Blenheim an “inferior” Derby winner.

== Stud record ==
He entered stud in 1932 at the Aga Khan's Haras Marly-la-Ville in Val-d'Oise, France, where he stood at a fee of 400 guineas. In his first crop of foals, he sired Mumtaz Begum (bred eight winners, including Nasrullah), followed the next year by Mahmoud, who won the 1936 Epsom Derby. His next crop of foals included Donatello, one of Federico Tesio’s best horses who sired Crepello and Alycidon.

He was sold after that year's breeding season for £45,000 to an American syndicate that included Claiborne Farm, Calumet Farm, Greentree Farm and Stoner Creek Stud before being exported to America in 1936 where he was known as Blenheim II. In America he sired the 1941 U.S. Triple Crown champion, Whirlaway and Jet Pilot, who won the 1947 Kentucky Derby and $198,740. Blenheim was also the damsire of Hill Gail, Mark-Ye-Well, Kauai King, Ponder and Le Paillon. Blenheim was American Champion sire in 1941.

Blenheim died in 1958 and was buried at Claiborne Farm.

== Sire line tree ==
Descendants of Blenheim (click to show)
- Blenheim
  - Hilltown
    - Valdina Orphan
  - Pampeiro
    - Fedor
    - Orneiro
  - Barra Sahib
  - Mahmoud
    - Afghan
      - Beauchef
      - Rey De Fracia
      - Fouquier
      - Gleeful
    - Flushing
      - Sub Factor
      - Star Rover
      - Atoll
    - Mehrali
    - Muzloom
    - Ahina
    - Ahriman
      - Good Nap
    - Fighting Chance
    - Romney
      - Homero
    - Royal Cheer
    - The Sultan
    - Bellwether
    - Distingue
    - Mahrhu
      - Skyrock
      - Sweet Mahrhu
    - Olympic Zenith
    - Sabu
    - Alabama
    - Burra Peg
    - Greek Warrior
    - Greylord
    - Jeep
    - Desert Ration
    - Mahout
    - Mighty Story
      - Mighty Mine
        - Might Tango
    - Billings
      - Midafternoon
    - Mount Marcy
      - Deerlands
    - Vulcan's Forge
    - Boodle
    - Mr Trouble
      - War Trouble
      - Aeroflint
    - Oil Capitol
      - Oil Wick
    - General Staff
    - Mameluke
    - Silver Wings
    - Yildiz
    - Fort Salonga
      - Sir Salonga
    - Moolah Bux
    - Cohoes
      - Quadrangle
        - Round Top
        - Angle Light
        - Brandford Court
        - Quadratic
      - Deck Hand
      - Shadow Brook
      - Cojak
    - The Axe
      - Poleax
      - Al Hattab
        - Alias Smith
        - Ambassador B
        - Roan Star
        - Ali Oop
        - Naked Sky
        - Age Quod Agis
        - Corsicana
        - Pass The Tab
        - Silver Supreme
      - Executioner
        - Grimaldi
        - Sestero
        - Poutioner
      - Twist The Axe
      - Hatchet Man
        - Half Iced
        - Moon Spirit
      - My Friend Gus
      - Sawbones
      - Lucy's Axe
        - Highland Springs
  - Vermeil
  - Wyndham
    - First Night
    - Garrick
    - Windy City
      - Old Pueblo
      - Tombstone
      - Restless Wind
        - Tumble Wind
        - Windjammer
        - Restless Jet
        - Restless Restless
        - Billion
        - Johnny O'Day
      - Rick City
      - Windy Sea
      - City Line
  - Bidar
    - ESB
  - Chenonceaux
  - Donatello
    - Bleneran
    - Marble Faun
    - Simone da Bologna
    - Orestes
      - Kelling
      - Pylades
    - The Chiseller
      - Chajacito
    - Good Company
      - Dark Company
    - Alycidon
      - Alpenhorn
        - Cabriere
        - Pipe Dream
        - Savonarola
        - Sword Dancer
      - Alexander
      - Preamble
      - Alfidir
      - Alcimedes
        - Galilee
        - Prince Grant
        - Honeyland
        - Divide And Rule
        - Portable
        - Silver Knight
        - Go Fun
      - Aleli
        - Moraes Tinto
      - Ben Lomond
      - Lucidon
      - Alcide
        - Atilla
        - Gate Keeper
        - Oncidium
        - Persian Garden
        - Alcalde
        - As Before
        - Alciglide
        - Allenheads
        - Mironton
        - Orbiter
        - Remand
        - Colours Flying
        - Postillion
        - Approval
        - Donalbain
        - Aritzo
        - No Alimony
        - Sea Anchor
        - Grey Baron
        - Waltz
      - All Serene
        - Aragon
      - Lacydon
        - Laconique
        - Lostalo
        - Lirio
        - Cipayo
      - High Perch
      - Kalydon
        - Ksar
        - Chil The Kite
      - Alcaeus
        - Toupet
      - Agamenon
      - Cigal
        - Giant
        - Urt
        - Lunard
        - Magestade
        - Cristallo
        - Orff
        - Ozu
      - Gaul
        - Gallic Temple
      - Grey Of Falloden
      - Twilight Alley
        - Midnight Court
      - Idomeneo
        - March Legend
      - Donato
      - Shy Boy
        - Longfella
      - Khalekan
    - Supertello
      - Ayala
    - Wellmead
    - Herculaneum
    - Acropolis
      - Espresso
        - Florino
        - Sagaro
        - Antuco
        - Lido
        - Flaubert
        - Seahase
        - Monsun
      - Vertigo
      - Carrack
      - Acrania
      - Mariner
      - Lemon Hart
      - Parthenon
      - Viani
        - Mazzanti
        - Belviale
      - Banco Divin
        - Viking
      - Baybird
    - Crepello
      - Credo
        - None Better
      - Crepes d'Enfer
      - Crepone
      - In The Gloaming
      - The Bo'sun
      - Crest Of The Wave
        - Far Time
        - Curly Wave
        - Guest Star
        - Crest Star
      - Crimea
      - Soderini
        - Tannenhorst
        - Konigssee
        - Prairie Bird
        - Zauberer
      - Indian Order
        - Furys Order
      - Kirsch Flambee
        - Gatecrasher
        - Sun Tonic
      - Orbit
      - Satinello
      - Busted
        - Bog Road
        - Valuta
        - Weavers' Hall
        - Balak
        - Bustino
        - Crash Course
        - Labus
        - Pevero
        - Butress
        - Tromos
        - Naamiri
        - Erins Isle
        - Clearly Bust
        - Romildo
        - Sharannpour
        - Shernazar
        - Buckley
        - Duca Di Busted
        - Mtoto
        - Buster King
      - Herbaceous
      - Minera
        - Mucho Sol
        - Combe
        - Cencerro
      - Bright As Gold
      - Candy Cane
      - Crucible
      - Sugar Apple
        - Harrisand
      - Barrons Court
      - Calaboose
        - Vidar
        - Dersim
      - Carnival Night
        - Mr Ross
      - New Chapter
        - Catus
        - Emkar
      - Vervain
      - Cry Baby
      - Great Wall
      - Recalled
      - Caerdeon
      - Crepona
      - Linden Tree
        - Opalus
        - Linden Flora
      - Pentland Firth
      - Red Cross
      - Trusted
        - Bant
        - Stimul
      - Clwyd
      - Perello
      - St Justin
    - Martini
    - Dimitri
      - Chianti
  - Drap d'Or
  - Le Grand Duc
    - Mokany Legeny
    - Monmouth
    - Flying Duke
    - Iron Duke
    - Aristocrat
  - Domenico Ghirlandaio
    - Ermellino
    - Val Sandro
  - Khan Bahadur
    - Adalid
    - Aladin
    - Bahadur Fair
    - Byland
      - Crown Law
  - Mirza
    - Saint Amour
      - Escorial
    - Baksishi
    - Northern Star
    - Punto Fijo
  - Hastings
  - Tramail
  - Benagi
  - Moradabad
  - War Lord
    - Guerrier
    - Gallant Duke
    - Sir Blenheim
  - Whirlaway
    - Dart By
    - Whirling Fox
    - Whirling Bat
    - Kurun
  - Blandisher
  - Ramillies
  - Star Beacon
  - Thumbs Up
    - Selector
    - Lion
    - Jampol
  - Ocean Wave
  - Star Blen
  - Big V
  - Blenban
  - Hail Victory
    - Snowbound
  - Air Hero
  - Cientifico
  - Fervent
    - Rockcastle
  - Jet Pilot
    - Jet Jewel
      - Jewel's Reward
      - Pollux
        - Nearly On Time
    - Jet Master
    - Jet's Date
    - Smart Apple
      - Fleet Apple
    - Jet Action
      - Hot Dust
        - Mike John G
        - Atractivo
        - Petrarque
        - Amadeo
        - El Oriental
      - Jolly Jet
        - Funny Man
        - Jolly River
        - Jolly Good
        - Cirada
        - Kiralyhago
        - Kurazsi
        - Alnok
    - Jet General
    - Pilot
  - Fly Away
  - Free America
    - Correlation
      - Mr Correlation
  - Bryan G
    - Sayil
  - Battle Morn
    - Warhead
  - Adaptable
  - Alate
  - Quick Lunch
  - Saratoga

== Pedigree ==
Pedigree of Blenheim (GB), brown stallion, 1927
Sire Blandford	Swynford	John O'Gaunt	Isinglass*
Sire Blandford	Swynford	John O'Gaunt	La Fleche*
Sire Blandford	Swynford	Canterbury Pilgrim	Tristan
Sire Blandford	Swynford	Canterbury Pilgrim	Pilgrimage
Sire Blandford	Blanche	White Eagle	Gallinule
Sire Blandford	Blanche	White Eagle	Merry Gal
Sire Blandford	Blanche	Black Cherry	Bendigo
Sire Blandford	Blanche	Black Cherry	Black Duchess
Dam Malva	Charles O'Malley	Desmond	St Simon*
Dam Malva	Charles O'Malley	Desmond	L'Abbesse de Jouarre
Dam Malva	Charles O'Malley	Goody Two-Shoes	Isinglass*
Dam Malva	Charles O'Malley	Goody Two-Shoes	Sandal
Dam Malva	Wild Arum	Robert le Diable	Ayrshire
Dam Malva	Wild Arum	Robert le Diable	Rose Bay
Dam Malva	Wild Arum	Marliacea	Martagon
Dam Malva	Wild Arum	Marliacea	Flitters (Family 1-e)

* Blenheim is inbred 4S x 4D to the stallion Isinglass, meaning that he appears fourth generation on the sire side of his pedigree, and fourth generation on the dam side of his pedigree.

* Blenheim is inbred 5S x 4D to the stallion St Simon, meaning that he appears fifth generation (via Le Fleche) on the sire side of his pedigree, and fourth generation on the dam side of his pedigree.
