= Ocean Wave (disambiguation) =

Ocean Wave was an American racehorse.

Ocean Wave or Ocean Waves may also refer to:

- Ocean Wave (sidewheeler), an 1890s steamboat in Oregon and Washington, United States
- Ocean Wave (shipwreck), a site on Lake Michigan that is listed on the U.S. National Register of Historic Places
- Ocean Waves, a 1993 film by Tomomi Mochizuki

== See also ==
- Wind wave, which includes waves in the ocean
