= Super Concorde =

American-bred Thoroughbred racehorse

- Sire: Bold Reasoning
- Grandsire: Boldnesian
- Dam: Prime Abord
- Damsire: Primera
- Sex: Stallion
- Foaled: 20 April 1975
- Country: United States
- Colour: Brown
- Breeder: Nelson Bunker Hunt
- Owner: Walter Haefner
- Trainer: François Boutin
- Record: 8:4-0-0

Major wins
- Prix de Cabourg (1977); Prix Morny (1977); Grand Critérium (1977)

Awards
- Timeform rating 128 (1977), 123 (1978); Top-rated French-trained two-year-old (1977)

Super Concorde (20 April 1975 – 1987) was an American-bred French-trained Thoroughbred racehorse and sire. He was the highest-rated two-year-old in France in 1977 when he won Prix de Cabourg and Prix Morny over sprint distances before defeating a strong field in France's premier race for juveniles, the Grand Critérium. He was disappointing in three runs in 1978 and was retired to stud after having won four of his eight races.

== Background ==
Super Concorde was a "strong, attractive" brown horse bred in Kentucky by Nelson Bunker Hunt. He was from the second of three crops of foals sired by Bold Reasoning, the winner of the Withers Stakes in 1971. Bold Reasoning also sired the American Triple Crown winner Seattle Slew before dying at the age of seven in 1975. Super Concorde's dam, Prime Abord won the Prix de Royallieu and finished seventh when second favourite for The Oaks in 1970. A daughter of the Oaks winner Homeward Bound, she was born with a club foot and was reportedly bought by Nelson Bunker Hunt only because his agents visited the farm during a snowstorm and failed to notice the deformity.

As a yearling, Super Concorde was sent to the sales and was bought for $200,000 by representatives of Walter Haefner. The colt was sent to Europe where he was trained in France by François Boutin.

== Racing career ==
=== 1977: two-year-old season ===
On his racecourse debut, Super Concorde defeated three opponents in race over 1000 metres at Chantilly Racecourse and then won the Prix de Cabourg over 1200 metres at Deauville. The colt was then moved up in class for the Group One Prix Morny run on 21 August over the same course and distance as the Prix de Cabourg and started the 8/10 favourite after Philippe Paquet elected to ride him in preference to the Prix Robert Papin winner Vific. Super Concorde led soon after the start, as he had done in his previous starts, and held on in the closing stages to win by a neck from Little Love, with the Italian colt El-Muleta a length and a half away in third. The colt started favourite for the Prix de la Salamandre over 1400m at Longchamp Racecourse on 11 September, but failed to reproduce his earlier form, fighting his jockey's attempts to restrain him and finishing fourth of the eight runners behind the British-trained outsider John de Coombe, Bilal and Kenmare.

On 9 October at Longchamp, Super Concorde started 3.4/1 second favourite for the Grand Critérium against a field which included Bilal, Kenmare, Jaazeiro, John de Coombe, Pyjama Hunt, Little Love and Acamas. The Boutin stable also ran Crazy Dmitri as a pacemaker in order to ensure a true test of stamina over the 1600m course. Super Concorde settled behind the leaders, took the lead 400m from the finish and won by three-quarters of a length and a neck from Pyjama Hunt and Acamas.

=== 1978: three-year-old season ===
Super Concorde was difficult to train as a three-year-old and ran only three times. On 16 April he started odds-on favourite for the Prix de Guiche at Longchamp but finished fifth of the six runners behind Gay Mecene. He did not reappear until late June when he was matched against older horses in the Group One Prix d'Ispahan. He produced his best effort of the season to finish fourth behind the four-year-olds Carwhite, Trillion and Gairloch, with Kenmare, Roland Gardens and Enstone Spark among the beaten horses. On his final start he finished sixth of the nine runners in the Eclipse Stakes, appearing unsuited by the firm ground.

== Assessment ==
There was no International Classification of European two-year-olds in 1977: the official handicappers of Britain, Ireland and France compiled separate rankings for horses which competed in those countries. Super Concorde topped the French handicap, two pounds ahead of Pyjama Hunt and Acamas. The independent Timeform organisation awarded him a rating of 128, two pounds below the Irish-trained Try My Best. In the following year, he was rated 123 by Timeform, fifteen pounds below their top-rated horse Alleged. In the International Classification for three-year-olds he was rated thirteen pounds below the top-rated Ile de Bourbon.

== Stud record ==
On his retirement from racing Super Concorde was bought back by Nelson Bunker Hunt and became a breeding stallion at Gainesway Farm in Kentucky, beginning his stud career at a fee of $20,000. He was not a particularly successful stallion, but sired some good winners including Martha Stevens (Nell Gwyn Stakes), Big Shuffle (Cork and Orrery Stakes, leading sire in Germany), Super May (Mervyn Leroy Handicap), Over the Ocean (Prix Perth), Concorde Bound (Suffolk Downs Sprint Handicap) and Croeso (Florida Derby). Super Concorde died in 1987.

== Pedigree ==
Pedigree of Super Concorde (USA), brown colt, 1975
Sire Bold Reasoning (USA) 1968	Boldnesian (USA); 1963	Bold Ruler	Nasrullah
Sire Bold Reasoning (USA) 1968	Boldnesian (USA); 1963	Bold Ruler	Miss Disco
Sire Bold Reasoning (USA) 1968	Boldnesian (USA); 1963	Alanesian	Polynesian
Sire Bold Reasoning (USA) 1968	Boldnesian (USA); 1963	Alanesian	Alablue
Sire Bold Reasoning (USA) 1968	Reason to Earn (USA); 1963	Hail to Reason	Turn-To
Sire Bold Reasoning (USA) 1968	Reason to Earn (USA); 1963	Hail to Reason	Nothirdchance
Sire Bold Reasoning (USA) 1968	Reason to Earn (USA); 1963	Sailing House	Wait a Bit
Sire Bold Reasoning (USA) 1968	Reason to Earn (USA); 1963	Sailing House	Marching Home
Dam Prime Abord (GB) 1967	Primera (GB); 1954	My Babu	Djebel
Dam Prime Abord (GB) 1967	Primera (GB); 1954	My Babu	Perfume
Dam Prime Abord (GB) 1967	Primera (GB); 1954	Pirette	Deiri
Dam Prime Abord (GB) 1967	Primera (GB); 1954	Pirette	Pimpette
Dam Prime Abord (GB) 1967	Homeward Bound (GB); 1961	Alycidon	Donatello
Dam Prime Abord (GB) 1967	Homeward Bound (GB); 1961	Alycidon	Aurora
Dam Prime Abord (GB) 1967	Homeward Bound (GB); 1961	Sabie River	Signal Light
Dam Prime Abord (GB) 1967	Homeward Bound (GB); 1961	Sabie River	Amorcille (Family: 3-l)
