= Princess Elizabeth Stakes =

Flat horse race in Britain

- Class: Group 3
- Location: Epsom Downs; Epsom, England
- Race type: Flat / Thoroughbred
- Sponsor: Oddschecker
- Website: Epsom Downs

Race information
- Distance: 1m 113y (1,713 metres)
- Surface: Turf
- Track: Left-handed
- Qualification: Three-years-old and up fillies & mares
- Weight: 8 st 10 lb (3yo); 9 st 8 lb (4yo+); Penalties; 7 lb for Group 1 winners * 5 lb for Group 2 winners * 3 lb for Group 3 winners * * since August 31 last year
- Purse: £100,000 (2025); 1st: £56,710

Princess Elizabeth Stakes
2026
Sparks Fly	Love Dynasty	Pacific Mission

Previous years
2025
Spiritual	Bright Thunder	Sparks Fly
2024
Breege	Chic Colombine	Royal Dress
2023
Prosperous Voyage	Random Harvest	Astral Beau
2022
Bashkirova	Potapova	Roman Mist
2021
Parent's Prayer	Nazuna	Statement

2020-2011
2020
Summer Romance	Cloak Of Spirits	Rose Of Kildare
2019
Anna Nerium	Awesometank	Veracious
2018
Wilamina	Anna Nerium	Shenanigans
2017
Laugh Aloud	Absolute Blast	Tisbutadream
2016
Epsom Icon	Sayana	Rosie Cotton
2015
Arabian Queen	Crowley's Law	Odeliz
2014
Thistle Bird	Odeliz	Just The Judge
2013
Thistle Bird	Gifted Girl	Ladys First
2012
Clinical	Joviality	Barefoot Lady
2011
Antara	First City	Clinical

2010-2001
2010
Antara	Reggane	Pachattack
2009
Eva's Request	Alnadana	Spacious
2008
Lady Gloria	Cicerole	Enforce
2007
Echelon	Bahia Breeze	Nannina
2006
Echelon	Musicanna	Zayn Zen
2005
Sundrop	Peeress	Secret History
2004
Gonfilia	Kunda	Qasirah
2003
Aldora	Londonnetdotcom	Pearl Queen
2002
Kootenay	Golden Silca	Borders Belle
2001
Sheppard's Watch	Lady Miletrian	Aunty Rose

2000-1991
2000
Golden Silca	High Walden	Icicle
1999
Fairy Queen	Risque Lady	Sleepless
1998
Lilli Claire	Jinsiyah	Anna
1997
Samara	Charlotte Corday	Out West
1996
Donna Viola	Hagwah	Nagnagnag
1995
Neither Nor	Brave Revival	Brief Glimpse
1991
Joli's Princess	Himiko	Sumonda

1990-1989
1990
Rafha	Spurned	La Cabrilla
1989
Sharka	Sweeping	Homely Touch

The Princess Elizabeth Stakes is a Group 3 flat horse race in Great Britain open to fillies and mares aged three years or older. It is run at Epsom Downs over a distance of 1 mile and 113 yards (1,713 metres), and it is scheduled to take place each year in early June.

== History ==
An event called the Princess Elizabeth Stakes used to be contested at Epsom in April. It was restricted to three-year-old fillies, and it served as a trial for the Oaks. For a period it held Group 3 status, but it was subsequently downgraded to Listed level. It was switched to Kempton Park in 1991, and it was discontinued in 1992. Winners of this race included Rockfel, Carrozza, Homeward Bound and Rafha.

The present version has developed from the Victress Stakes, a Listed race established in 1995. It was renamed the Princess Elizabeth Stakes in 2001, and it was promoted to Group 3 level in 2004.

The race is now held on the second day of Epsom's two-day Derby Festival meeting, the same day as the Epsom Derby.

== Records ==
Most successful horse (2 wins):

- Echelon – 2006, 2007
- Antara – 2010, 2011
- Thistle Bird - 2013, 2014

Leading jockey (7 wins):

- Frankie Dettori – Fairy Queen (1999), Gonfilia (2004), Sundrop (2005), Antara (2010, 2011), Wilamina (2018), Prosperous Voyage (2023)

Leading trainer (5 wins):

- Saeed bin Suroor – Fairy Queen (1999), Gonfilia (2004), Sundrop (2005), Antara (2010, 2011)

== Winners ==
Year	Winner	Age	Jockey	Trainer	Time
1988	Aim For The Top	3	Walter Swinburn	Michael Stoute	1:51.74
1989	Sharka	3	Steve Cauthen	Henry Cecil	1:53.85
1990	Rafha	3	Steve Cauthen	Henry Cecil	1:47.52
1991	Joli's Princess	3	Willie Carson	Mick Ryan	1:41.20
1995	Neither Nor	6	Gary Carter	D. A. Wilson	1:43.34
1996	Donna Viola	4	Wendyll Woods	Chris Wall	1:42.62
1997	Samara	4	Pat Eddery	John Dunlop	1:44.21
1998	Lilli Claire	5	Tim Sprake	David Elsworth	1:47.31
1999	Fairy Queen	3	Frankie Dettori	Saeed bin Suroor	1:47.69
2000	Golden Silca	4	Steve Drowne	Mick Channon	1:47.40
2001	Sheppard's Watch	3	Martin Dwyer	Marcus Tregoning	1:45.42
2002	Kootenay	3	Pat Eddery	John Dunlop	1:48.92
2003	Aldora	4	Martin Dwyer	Mick Ryan	1:44.23
2004	Gonfilia	4	Frankie Dettori	Saeed bin Suroor	1:45.61
2005	Sundrop	4	Frankie Dettori	Saeed bin Suroor	1:50.27
2006	Echelon	4	Kieren Fallon	Sir Michael Stoute	1:45.59
2007	Echelon	5	Kerrin McEvoy	Sir Michael Stoute	1:47.67
2008	Lady Gloria	4	Tom Queally	James Given	1:44.69
2009	Eva's Request	4	Edward Creighton	Mick Channon	1:43.84
2010	Antara	4	Frankie Dettori	Saeed bin Suroor	1:42.78
2011	Antara	5	Frankie Dettori	Saeed bin Suroor	1:43.72
2012	Clinical	4	Luke Morris	Sir Mark Prescott	1:43.84
2013	Thistle Bird	5	James Doyle	Roger Charlton	1:46.90
2014	Thistle Bird	6	James Doyle	Roger Charlton	1:42.65
2015	Arabian Queen	3	Silvestre de Sousa	David Elsworth	1:43.02
2016	Epsom Icon	3	Silvestre de Sousa	Mick Channon	1:47.29
2017	Laugh Aloud	4	James Doyle	John Gosden	1:41.54
2018	Wilamina	5	Frankie Dettori	Martyn Meade	1:44.30
2019	Anna Nerium	4	Tom Marquand	Richard Hannon Jr.	1:40.82
2020 (Note: The 2020 race was run in July and restricted to three-year-old fillies only due to the COVID-19 pandemic in the United Kingdom)	Summer Romance	3	William Buick	Charlie Appleby	1:44.71
2021	Parent's Prayer	4	Oisin Murphy	Archie Watson	1:44.25
2022	Bashkirova	4	Tom Marquand	William Haggas	1:43.06
2023	Prosperous Voyage	4	Frankie Dettori	Ralph Beckett	1:43.60
2024	Breege	4	Jason Hart	John & Sean Quinn	1:46.32
2025	Spiritual	4	Robert Havlin	John & Thady Gosden	1:43.94
2026	Sparks Fly	6	Laura Pearson	David Loughnane	1:46.07

== See also ==
- Horse racing in Great Britain
- List of British flat horse races
