= Windy City (horse) =

British-bred Thoroughbred racehorse

- Sire: Wyndham
- Grandsire: Blenheim
- Dam: Staunton
- Damsire: The Satrap
- Sex: Stallion
- Foaled: 1949
- Country: United Kingdom
- Colour: Chestnut
- Breeder: Lt.-Col. Hon. Herbrand Charles Alexander DSO
- Owner: Ray Bell; Petite Luellwitz
- Trainer: Paddy Prendergast; Willie Alvarado
- Record: 9:6-2-0

Major wins
- Phoenix Plate (1951); Gimcrack Stakes (1951); San Felipe Handicap (1952); San Gabriel Handicap (1952)

Awards
- Top-rated two-year-old in Britain, France and Ireland (1951); Timeform top-rated horse (1951); Timeform rating 142 (1951)

Windy City (also known as Windy City II, 1949–1964) was a British-bred Irish-trained Thoroughbred racehorse and sire. He was the leading European two-year-old of 1951 when he won four races including the Gimcrack Stakes and was awarded a Timeform rating of 142, which remains one of the highest in the organisation's history. In the following season he was sold and exported to the United States where he twice defeated the future Kentucky Derby winner Hill Gail before his racing career was ended by injury. He was retired to stud where he had some success as a breeding stallion.

== Background ==
Windy City was a strongly built chestnut horse bred by Herbrand Charles Alexander the son of the 4th Earl of Caledon and the older brother of Field Marshal Alexander. He was by far the most successful horse sired by Wyndham, a sprinter whose most important wins came as a two-year-old in 1935, when he won the New Stakes at Royal Ascot and the National Breeders' Produce Stakes at Sandown Park. Windy City's dam, a French-bred mare named Staunton, came from a relatively undistinguished Thoroughbred family which had produced little of note since the 1901 Epsom Derby winner, Volodyovski.

As a yearling, Windy City was sent to the sales at Dublin where his modest pedigree meant that he attracted little interest. He was bought for 700 guineas by Paddy Prendergast on behalf of American owner Ray Bell. Prenderagst, a trainer noted for his handling of precocious two-year-olds, trained the colt at his stable at the Curragh, County Kildare.

== Racing career ==
=== 1951: two-year-old season ===
Windy City made his racecourse debut at Phoenix Park Racecourse in April, winning a maiden race by ten lengths. He was then sent to England where he won the Oulton Stakes at Chester Racecourse in May by five lengths. The colt was back in Ireland in August and took the Phoenix Plate over five furlongs at Phoenix Park Racecourse by eight lengths. Later that month, Windy City was moved up in distance to six furlongs for the Gimcrack Stakes at York Racecourse. Ridden by English champion jockey Gordon Richards he started 5/4 favourite and won by five lengths from Pharaos.

The Bloodstock Breeders Review of 1951 report of the Gimcrack by James Park follows. a medium-sized chestnut, well nigh impossible to fault in conformation, symmetry or balance... True to his reputation, he was something of a handful behind the barrier and when the tapes went up Gordon Richards is said to have lost his irons. The colt came along in the centre of the course and when the jockey fairly got at him at the end of half a mile we saw what Windy City could do. It seemed to me that he galloped in one piece. It was just like an arrow going straight through the air. Head stretched right out he went through in perfect balance with no deviation from his head or body. We do not see that sort of thing very often and the only way I can describe him is as a racing-machine. It was more like an automation than flesh and blood. There was a difference of opinion as to where he took up the running, but in the last furlong only one was galloping and that was Windy City. He went right through on a level keel to win by five lengths.

On his final appearance of the season, the colt was sent to France to contest the Prix d'Arenberg over 1000 metres at Chantilly Racecourse. He became agitated before the race and lost several lengths at the start (starting stalls were not used in Europe at this time). He made up much of the lost ground but narrowly failed to catch the filly Pomare, who was carrying eleven pounds less. Pomare went on to win the Poule d'Essai des Pouliches in the following spring. Despite his defeat, Windy City was officially rated the best two-year-old colt to race in France in 1951 and also topped the ratings in England and Ireland. Thomas Healy wrote in the Bloodstock Breeders Review of 1951 that Windy City "speed was phenomenal". The same article expressed the view that"Windy City was always temperamental; more often than not, he did not strike off from the start until his rivals had gone away. He was after them in a flash, and, save in the Prix d'Arenberg he came on to win in a canter". Paddy Prendergast told Mr Healy "the colt required very little training; he really trained himself".

=== 1952: three-year-old season ===
Before the start of the 1952 season, Windy City was taken to the United States and offered for sale by his owner, Ray Bell. He was bought for $150,000 by Gus Luellwitz and raced as a three-year-old in the colours of his buyer's wife, Mrs. Petite Luellwitz. Windy City II, as he was now named, finished unplaced on his American debut, but at the end of January he won the San Gabriel Stakes over seven furlongs at Santa Anita Park, beating A Gleam and Hill Gail. At the same course in February, he moved up to one and one-sixteenth of a mile for the San Felipe Handicap, a trial race for the Kentucky Derby. Ridden by Eddie Arcaro, he started favourite and won by two and a half lengths, with Hill Gail in seventh. In the Santa Anita Derby over nine furlongs, Windy City II started 1/2 favourite but finished second, beaten four lengths by Hill Gail. He sustained an injury during the race, which recurred after a training gallop in late March, forcing him out of the Kentucky Derby. Although he returned to training later that year, he did not recover sufficiently to compete again.

== Assessment ==
Until the British, Irish, and French handicappers collaborated to produce the first International Classification in 1977, each country produced its own ratings of the best two-year-olds. Windy City was given a weight rating of 133 pounds in the British "Free Handicap", placing him five pounds clear of the filly Zabara. By also topping the Irish and French handicaps, Windy City achieved a unique treble. The independent Timeform organisation awarded the colt a rating of 142, the second highest they had given up to that time, behind Tudor Minstrel and equal with Abernant. Racehorses of 1951 called him "the fastest 2-Y-O in Europe in 1951". Timeform also described the horse as "a fine, good-looking colt of exceptional physical development: highly strung, very much on his toes, and a handful at the gate:not merely a good horse, but, in his possession of brilliant speed, quite an exceptional horse: Since 1951, the rating has been surpassed by only Sea Bird, Brigadier Gerard, and Frankel and remains the highest figure ever assigned to a two-year-old or to any horse trained in Ireland.

In their book A Century of Champions, based on a modified version of the Timeform system, John Randall and Tony Morris rated Windy City the fifth best British or Irish-trained two-year-old of the 20th century.

== Stud career ==
Windy City was officially retired in January 1953 and began his career as a breeding stallion at Sunnyslope Farm at Riverside, California. He proved reasonably successful as a sire of winners. The best of his progeny included the filly Blue Norther (Kentucky Oaks) and the colts City Line (Louisiana Derby), Old Pueblo (Del Mar Futurity), and Restless Wind (Washington Park Futurity Stakes). Windy City died from a twisted intestine in 1964.

== Pedigree ==
Pedigree of Windy City (GB), chestnut stallion, 1949
| Sire Wyndham (GB) 1933 | Blenheim (GB); 1927 | Blandford | Swynford |
| Sire Wyndham (GB) 1933 | Blenheim (GB); 1927 | Blandford | Blanche |
| Sire Wyndham (GB) 1933 | Blenheim (GB); 1927 | Malva | Charles O'Malley |
| Sire Wyndham (GB) 1933 | Blenheim (GB); 1927 | Malva | Wild Arum |
| Sire Wyndham (GB) 1933 | Bossover (GB); 1921 | The Boss | Orby |
| Sire Wyndham (GB) 1933 | Bossover (GB); 1921 | The Boss | Southern Cross |
| Sire Wyndham (GB) 1933 | Bossover (GB); 1921 | Rhodesian mare | Rhodesian |
| Sire Wyndham (GB) 1933 | Bossover (GB); 1921 | Rhodesian mare | Sanover |
| Dam Staunton (FR) 1940 | The Satrap (GB); 1924 | The Tetrarch | Roi Herode |
| Dam Staunton (FR) 1940 | The Satrap (GB); 1924 | The Tetrarch | Vahren |
| Dam Staunton (FR) 1940 | The Satrap (GB); 1924 | Scotch Gift | Symington |
| Dam Staunton (FR) 1940 | The Satrap (GB); 1924 | Scotch Gift | Maund |
| Dam Staunton (FR) 1940 | Crotanstown (GB); 1924 | Bridge of Earn | Cyllene |
| Dam Staunton (FR) 1940 | Crotanstown (GB); 1924 | Bridge of Earn | Santa Brigida |
| Dam Staunton (FR) 1940 | Crotanstown (GB); 1924 | Twincat | Bachelor's Double |
| Dam Staunton (FR) 1940 | Crotanstown (GB); 1924 | Twincat | Katusha (Family:14-d) |
