= Foster Robinson =

English cricketer, horse owner, and businessman

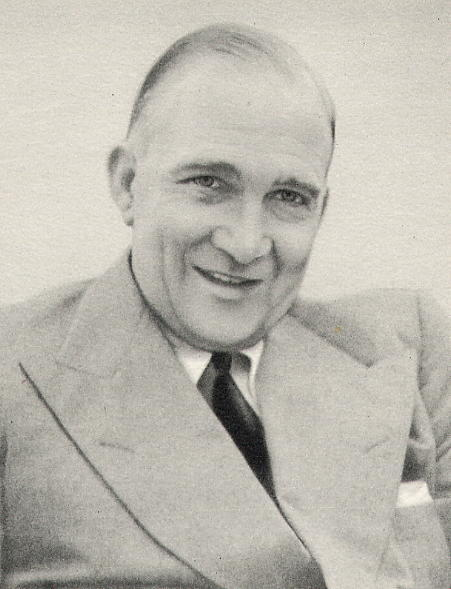
Foster G. Robinson as Chairman of E. S. & A. Robinson 1944.

Sir Foster Gotch Robinson (19 September 1880 – 31 October 1967) was an English first-class cricketer, horse owner and businessman.

Robinson was born in Sneyd Park, Bristol, to Edward Robinson and was the grandson of Elisha Smith Robinson. He was educated at Clifton College, Bristol and Exeter College, Oxford. Robinson captained the Gloucestershire cricket team from 1919 to 1923.

He held various positions, including President of The Grateful Society in 1940, Master of Clifton Rugby Football Club 1943–1944, Master of The Society of Merchant Venturers, 1943–1945, and Chairman of E. S. & A. Robinson, a Bristol-based printing and packaging company.

He was knighted at Buckingham Palace on 15 July 1958 by Prince Philip, Duke of Edinburgh.

He was the owner and breeder of Homeward Bound, who won the 1964 Oaks; Huguenot, winner of 19 races; and Merchant Venturer, second to Relko in the 1963 Derby.

Robinson died in Eastwood Manor, East Harptree, Somerset, aged 87.
