= Mr Jinks =

British-bred Thoroughbred racehorse

- Sire: Tetratema
- Grandsire: The Tetrarch
- Dam: False Piety
- Damsire: Lemberg
- Sex: Stallion
- Foaled: 1926
- Country: United Kingdom
- Colour: Grey
- Breeder: Dermot McCalmont
- Owner: Dermot McCalmont
- Trainer: Atty Persse
- Record: 15: 9-3-1
- Earnings: £25,153

Major wins
- New Stakes (1928); July Stakes (1928); Lavant Stakes (1928); Prendergast Stakes (1928); Severals Stakes; 2000 Guineas (1929); St James's Palace Stakes (1929)

Awards
- Top-rated British two-year-old colt (1928)

Mr Jinks (1926 – 1952) was a British Thoroughbred racehorse and sire. He was one of the best two-year-olds in England in 1928 when he won five of his seven races including the New Stakes, July Stakes, Lavant Stakes and Prendergast Stakes. In the following spring he took the Severals Stakes before recording his biggest success in the 2000 Guineas. He failed when favourite for the Epsom Derby but returned to form to win the St James's Palace Stakes. His performances subsequently deteriorated and he was retired from racing at the end of the year. He made little impact as a breeding stallion.

== Background ==
Mr Jinks was a "massive" grey horse with "big, spreading feet" bred in Northern Ireland by Dermot McCalmont who owned the horse during his racing career. He was trained by McCalmont's cousin Henry Seymour "Atty" Persse at Chattis Hill near Stockbridge in Hampshire. As a three-year-old Mr Jinks stood 16 hands high with a girth of 73 inches.

Mr Jinks inherited his grey colour from his sire Tetratema, the leading British two-year-old of 1919 who went on to win the 2000 Guineas and many important sprint races. As a breeding stallion, Tetratema sired many good sprinters and milers including Tiffin and Myrobella and was the British champion sire in 1929. Mr Jinks' dam False Piety was a granddaughter of Alicia, whose other female-line descendants included the Nunthorpe Stakes winner Golden Cloud.

Although a character named Mr Jinks appears in The Pickwick Papers, the horse was reportedly named after John Jinks, a former mayor of Sligo.

== Racing career ==
=== 1928: two-year-old season ===
Mr Jinks had acquired a considerable reputation before he ever appeared on a racecourse and when he made his debut in the New Stakes at Royal Ascot in June many "eager" spectators crowded the paddock to see the "powerful, strong-quartered, big-limbed colt." Ridden by Harry Beasley he duly took the race at odds of 9/4, recovering from a poor start to win "in the stle of an exceedingly useful colt" from Lord Astor's Cragadour. He was then sent to Sandown to contest the five furlong National Breeders' Produce Stakes, which at the time was the most valuable race of the season for two-year-olds, with prize money of over £7,000. He started joint-favourite but was beaten into second place by the filly Tiffin. In July at Newmarket Racecourse Mr Jinks returned to winning form when he won the July Stakes at odds of 4/11, beating the Coventry Stakes winner Reflector by half a length, and went on to win the Lavant Stakes at Goodwood Racecourse in August by a short head from the filly Turbine, to whom he was conceding 10 pounds.

Mr Jinks came back in autumn to take the Prendergast Stakes at Newmarket at odds of 13/8 and finished second to Reflector in the Buckenham Post Produce Stakes. Mr Jinks ended his season by winning the Hurst Park Two-year-old Stakes in November.

He ended the season with earnings of £8,800 and was rated the joint-best juvenile colt of the season, equal with the Middle Park Stakes winner Costaki Pasha and a pound behind Tiffin.

=== 1929: three-year-old season ===
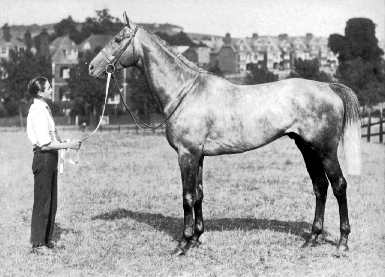
Mr Jinks' sire Tetratema

Mr Jinks began his second season by winning the Severals Stakes over five furlongs at Newmarket on 17 April. On 1 May, Mr Jinks, ridden by Beasley, started the 5/2 favourite for the 121st running of the 2000 Guineas over the Rowley Mile at Newmarket. The best fancied of the other 21 runners included Costaki Pasha, Gay Day, Cragadour and the Irish colt Trigo. The final stages saw the race evolve into a struggle between Mr Jinks and Cragadour, who were racing far apart on either side of the wide, straight course. Mr Jinks prevailed by a head from Cragadour, with Gay Day a length and a half away in third. After the race Beasley said "My horse was a bit lively at the post, but once away lie ran as smootha race as possible. I was about three lengths behind the leaders at the Bushes, and moved up to take the lead in the bottom of the Dip. After that I was not headed again".

Mr Jinks was then moved up in distance for the Newmarket Stakes (a trial race for the Epsom Derby) on 15 May. In a very close and "exciting" finish he was beaten a short head by Lord Derby's Hunter's Moon, with Midlothian in third place.

Despite his defeat in the Newmarket Stakes and doubts about his stamina, Mr Jinks started favourite for the Derby over 1 1/2 miles at Epsom on 5 June but began to struggle at half way and finished eleventh behind Trigo. Later that month at Royal Ascot the colt was dropped back in distance for the one-mile St James's Palace Stakes and won "very comfortaby" from seven opponents at odds of 6/4. After his win at Ascot, Mr Jinks began to be described as a "speed specialist". The colt was generally expected to follow up in the Sussex Stakes at Goodwood and started at odds of 4/7 but finished fourth behind Le Phare. In September Mr Jinks finished tailed-off in last behind Trigo in the St Leger Stakes over 14 1/2 furlongs at Doncaster Racecourse.

Mr Jinks won one other minor race towards the end of the year and ended the season with earnings of £16,253, making him the second most financially successful racehorse of 1929.

== Assessment and honours ==
In their book, A Century of Champions, based on the Timeform rating system, John Randall and Tony Morris rated Mr Jinks an "inferior" winner of the 2000 Guineas.

== Stud record ==
After his retirement from racing Mr Jinks stood as a breeding stallion. He made a fairly promising start to his stud career, but his later record was disappointing. He died in 1952 at the age of 26.

== Sire line tree ==
- Mr Jinks
  - Maltravers
  - Fair William
    - Crusader's Horn
  - Rogerstone Castle
  - The Jigger
  - Effervescence

== Pedigree ==
Pedigree of Mr Jinks (GB), grey stallion, 1926
Sire Tetratema (GB) 1917	The Tetrarch (IRE); 1911	Roi Herode (FR)	Le Samaritain
Sire Tetratema (GB) 1917	The Tetrarch (IRE); 1911	Roi Herode (FR)	Roxelane
Sire Tetratema (GB) 1917	The Tetrarch (IRE); 1911	Vahren (GB)	Bona Vista*
Sire Tetratema (GB) 1917	The Tetrarch (IRE); 1911	Vahren (GB)	Castania
Sire Tetratema (GB) 1917	Scotch Gift (GB); 1907	Symington	Ayrshire
Sire Tetratema (GB) 1917	Scotch Gift (GB); 1907	Symington	Tarporley
Sire Tetratema (GB) 1917	Scotch Gift (GB); 1907	Maund	Ianthe
Sire Tetratema (GB) 1917	Scotch Gift (GB); 1907	Maund	Sandal
Dam False Piety (GB) 1917	Lemberg (GB); 1907	Cyllene	Bona Vista*
Dam False Piety (GB) 1917	Lemberg (GB); 1907	Cyllene	Arcadia
Dam False Piety (GB) 1917	Lemberg (GB); 1907	Galicia	Galopin
Dam False Piety (GB) 1917	Lemberg (GB); 1907	Galicia	Isoletta
Dam False Piety (GB) 1917	St Begoe (GB); 1910	St Frusquin	St Simon
Dam False Piety (GB) 1917	St Begoe (GB); 1910	St Frusquin	Isabel
Dam False Piety (GB) 1917	St Begoe (GB); 1910	Alicia	Bend Or
Dam False Piety (GB) 1917	St Begoe (GB); 1910	Alicia	Alix (Family 22-d)

* Mr Jinks is inbred 4S x 4D to the stallion Bona Vista, meaning that he appears fourth generation on the sire side of his pedigree and fourth generation on the dam side of his pedigree.
