= Joe Marshall (jockey) =

British jockey (1908–1973)

Personal information
- Born: 21 September 1908 Edinburgh, Scotland
- Died: 28 September 1973 (aged 65) Brighton, England
- Occupation: Jockey

Horse racing career
- Sport: Horse racing

Major racing wins
- Major race wins: Derby Stakes (1929)

Significant horses
- Trigo

Joe Marshall (1908–1973) was a flat racing jockey, who won the 1929 Derby on Trigo.

== Career ==
Marshall was born in Edinburgh, where his father had lived for many years and worked in a hotel.

As a young man, Marshall was apprenticed to Stanley Wootton at Epsom. His first major win was on Abbot's Speed, trained by Fred Darling, in the 1927 Great Jubilee Handicap at Kempton. He also rode over jumps, his first winner coming over hurdles on Martonia at Hurst Park on 10 December 1927 on only his third jumps ride.

He was called up to ride Trigo in the Derby by another trainer Richard Dawson, after Trigo's intended jockey Michael Beary asked to ride Dawson's more fancied runner, Le Voleur. In the event, Trigo started at 33/1 but "won as he liked". Marshall said after the race that he felt he had it won when he took the lead half a mile from home and "never really had an uneasy moment". Marshall never rode Trigo again, but the attention generated by the win led to a new job in Chantilly. However, this was short lived.

He won few other big races, although he did twice win the Ayr Gold Cup. He rode under both codes into the 1950s but his career was ended after he was found to be placing bets and the stewards withdrew his licence.

His nephew John was also a jockey and their careers overlapped for a time. He also had a brother who he boxed in a charity boxing tournament three days after his Derby win.

He died in Brighton aged 65.

== Major wins ==
(United Kingdom) Great Britain

- Derby Stakes – Trigo (1929)

== See also ==
- List of jockeys

== Bibliography ==
- Mortimer, Roger; Onslow, Richard; Willett, Peter (1978). Biographical Encyclopaedia of British Racing. London: Macdonald and Jane's. ISBN 0-354-08536-0.
