= Fervent (horse) =

American Thoroughbred racehorse

- Sire: Blenheim II
- Grandsire: Blandford
- Dam: Hug Again
- Damsire: Stimulus
- Sex: Stallion
- Foaled: 1944
- Country: United States
- Color: Chestnut
- Breeder: Calumet Farm
- Owner: Calumet Farm
- Trainer: Ben & Jimmy Jones
- Record: 44: 17-8-4
- Earnings: US$347,135

Major wins
- Walden Stakes (1946); American Derby (1947); Dick Welles Stakes (1947); Pimlico Special (1947); Skokie Handicap (1947); Ben Ali Handicap (1948); Dixie Handicap (1948); Equipoise Mile Handicap (1948); Washington Park Handicap (1948)

Fervent (foaled 1944 in Kentucky) was an American Thoroughbred racehorse bred and raced by Warren Wright's renowned Calumet Farm at Lexington, Kentucky. The colt is best remembered for an August 23, 1947 American Derby win in which he broke the Washington Park track record with the then fastest mile and a quarter ever run by a three-year-old in the history of American Thoroughbred racing.

== Background ==
Fervent was sired by Blenheim II, a British import whose wins included their most prestigious race, the Epsom Derby. Blenheim II would earn Leading sire in North America honors in 1941. Fervent's dam, Hug Again, was a daughter of the good runner and sire Stimulus that won the important Pimlico Futurity. Hug Again's other progeny included multiple stakes winners Sun Again (1939) and Arrogate (1951).

Throughout his racing career Fervent was trained by Ben Jones and his son Jimmy. Both men would have outstanding careers that earned them induction into the U.S. Racing Hall of Fame.

== 1946: 2-year-old season ==
Racing at age two, Fervent's most significant win came in the November 13, 1946 Walden Stakes at Baltimore's Pimlico Race Course in which he defeated runner-up and stablemate Faultless by a head. A major event, other top class two-year-olds that won the Walden Stakes include U.S. Racing Hall of Fame inductees Reigh Count (1927) and his son, U.S. Triple Crown winner Count Fleet (1943), another U.S. Triple Crown winner Whirlaway (1940), and future Hall of Fame inductee Alsab (1941) who would defeat Whirlaway in a 1942 match race at Narragansett Park.

== 1947: 3-year-old season ==
Calumet Farm chose to run Fervent in the August 23 American Derby at Washington Park Race Track in Chicago and to run stablemate Faultless in the 1947 U.S. Triple Crown series that began in early May. In addition to Fervent's national record setting time in winning the American Derby, he again beat Cosmic Bomb and Phalanx who had finished second and third respectively.

Fervent closed out his 1947 campaign on October 31 with another major win at Pimlico Race Course. This time it would be in the Pimlico Special, a race won in 1945 by Calumet Farm's best runner Armed under jockey Douglas Dodson. For the 1947 edition, trainer Jimmy Jones again put Dodson on Armed and the up-and-coming young rider Albert Snider on Fervent who rode him to victory, again defeating runner-up Cosmic Bomb with Armed in third.

== 1948: 4-year-old season ==
In what would be another successful year in racing, Fervent won four important Stakes races, taking the Ben Ali Handicap at Keeneland, Dixie Handicap at Pimlico Race Course, Equipoise Mile Handicap at Arlington Park, and the Washington Park Handicap at Washington Park Race Track.

== At stud ==
When retired to stand at stud for Calumet Farm, among all of the progeny of Blenheim II, Fervent’s career earnings from racing ranked him second to Triple Crown winner Whirlaway. For Calumet, Fervent notably sired the colt Rockcastle (1952) that went on to win thirteen races including the 1955 Yankee Handicap and 1957 Tomasello Memorial Handicap, both at Suffolk Downs. Rockcastle retired with earnings of $115,100 in 1957 which would be equivalent to approximately $1,299,750 in July, 2025. However, at the time Calumet’s stable of sires also included, among others, Bull Lea, Citation, Coaltown, Faultless, Ponder and Sun Again. As such, when the French businessman Marcel Boussac, owner of the renowned House of Dior in Paris, and the Haras de Fresnay-le-Buffard in rural Neuvy-au-Houlme, a highly successful Thoroughbred racing and breeding operation, made a good offer in 1953 that was accepted. As a result, it meant further offspring of Fervent would most likely never be competing against Calumet runners.

== Pedigree ==
Pedigree of Fervent, chestnut stallion, 1944
Sire Blenheim II	Blandford	Swynford	John O'Gaunt
Sire Blenheim II	Blandford	Swynford	Canterbury Pilgrim
Sire Blenheim II	Blandford	Blanche	White Eagle
Sire Blenheim II	Blandford	Blanche	Black Cherry
Sire Blenheim II	Malva	Charles O'Malley	Desmond
Sire Blenheim II	Malva	Charles O'Malley	Goody Two-Shoes
Sire Blenheim II	Malva	Wild Arum	Robert Le Diable
Sire Blenheim II	Malva	Wild Arum	Marliacea
Dam Hug Again	Stimulus	Ultimus	Commando
Dam Hug Again	Stimulus	Ultimus	Running Stream
Dam Hug Again	Stimulus	Hurakan	Uncle
Dam Hug Again	Stimulus	Hurakan	The Hoyden
Dam Hug Again	Affection	Isidor	Amphion
Dam Hug Again	Affection	Isidor	Isis
Dam Hug Again	Affection	One I Love	Minting
Dam Hug Again	Affection	One I Love	The Apple (family: 9-f)
