= Atlantic City Race Course =

Horse race track in Mays Landing, New Jersey

Coordinates: 39°27′26.83″N 74°38′14.26″W

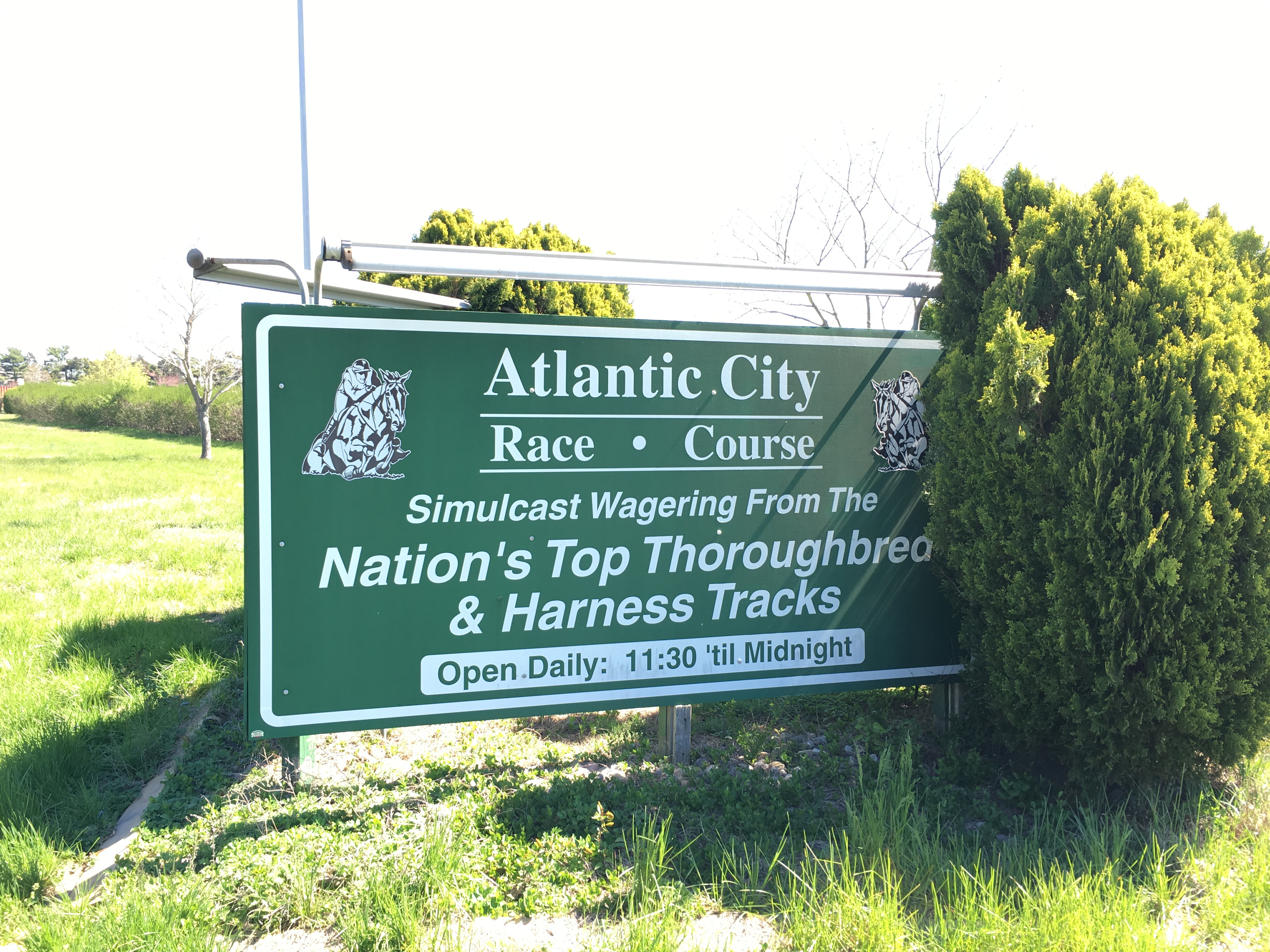
- Racecourse sign
- Interactive map of Atlantic City Race Course
- Location: Mays Landing, New Jersey; United States
- Owned by: Greenwood ACRA
- Date opened: 1946
- Date closed: 2015
- Course type: Flat

The Atlantic City Race Course (ACRC), formerly the Atlantic City Race Track, was a Thoroughbred horse race track located in the Mays Landing section of Hamilton Township, in Atlantic County, New Jersey, United States. The track is located off the Black Horse Pike (U.S. Route 322) next to the Hamilton Mall. Despite the name, the facility is located 14 miles (23 km) from Atlantic City. The facility closed permanently in January 2015.

The main track is 1 1/8 miles (1.8 km) in length and 100 feet (30 m) wide, with a 7 furlong chute. The stretch portion of the main track is 947.29 feet (288.73 m). The turf course is a 100-foot (30 m) wide, one mile (1.6 km) oval. The stands offer a seating capacity of 10,000, with standing room available for 25,000. In all, ACRC covers over 250 acres (1.0 km^{2}) of land.

== History ==
ACRC opened on July 22, 1946, as the Atlantic City Race Track, the work of a group of four individuals. The most famous of the group was John B. Kelly Sr., who created the race course together with Fred C. Scholler, Glendon Robertson and James "Sonny" Fraser. Shareholders included show business personalities Frank Sinatra, Bob Hope, Harry James, Sammy Kaye and Xavier Cugat.

Kelso, considered to be among the best racehorses of the twentieth century, made his two-year-old debut on September 4, 1959, at ACRC, at that time one of the country's premier tracks.

In 1964, the location served the shooting of scenes for Hitchcock's iconic thriller Marnie.

On August 1, 2 and 3, 1969 an estimated 100,000 people attended the Atlantic City Pop Festival at the race course. The overwhelming turn out was an unexpected and controversial state of affairs, as local government agencies and police departments strained to respond to the harbinger of the Woodstock Festival in upstate New York just a few weeks later. Roads approaching the race course were clogged with young people who spontaneously arrived to attend, forming an ad hoc "hippy hollow" in the surrounding forest areas in the vicinity.

In the late 1970s, the opening of casinos in Atlantic City affected track attendance as did later competition for quality horses from "racino"-type venues (where a casino and a racetrack are co-located and share facilities such as parking and restaurants and engage in cross-promotion) in regional states. Over time, ACRC could not operate profitably as attendance and handle dropped off year by year. Track owner Bob Levy announced the facility would hold a final abbreviated race meet in 1998, then close, presumably at the end of that year. The track remained open for several years after this, however, operating short, fair-like meets in order to retain its simulcast permit. In 2001, the track was sold to the owners of Philadelphia Park Racetrack and became primarily a simulcast facility. From 1998 to the present, ACRC conducted live race meets of between four and 10 days per year.

On November 16, 2006, Hal Handel, CEO of Greenwood Racing, announced that ACRC would increase live racing dates from 4 days per year to up to 20 days per year. In 2008, racing took place on six days; April 23, 24, 25, 30, May 1, and 2. The New Jersey Racing Commission ordered the track to offer 20 days of racing in 2009, but reduced the mandate to six when the track agreed to forego its pursuit of purse subsidy monies from an agreement between the New Jersey horse racing industry and the Atlantic City casinos.

In 2010, plans were revealed to redevelop a majority of the race course property and redevelop the race track. Plans called for the renovation of the grandstand and construction of an adjacent 20-story hotel and conference center, along with an office and research park occupied by NextGen Aviations. The office park, which would be called the "NextGen International Aviation Center for Excellence" would contain six office buildings totaling between 400,000 and 600,000 square feet (56,000 m^{2}) on the site of the parking lot, corporate and academic housing on the current site of the stables (which would be moved), as well as a transit center, which would replace the current "Convenience center" in the Hamilton Mall parking lot. The Wrangleboro Road entrance road to the mall would be extended into the proposed office park, as well as the construction of several new roads and parking lots on the site. The inside of the track oval would be renovated to include a lake and community greenspace. The project would have been a spin-off of the NextGen research park under construction at Atlantic City International Airport.

In 2011, the Atlantic City Race Course was a recipient of $1 million for capital improvements from the Casino Simulcast Fund, a fund designed to offset the loss of simulcast business at racetracks.

On January 9, 2015, Greenwood ACRA, owners and operators of Atlantic City Race Course, announced the racetrack was ceasing operations and closing permanently. The last day of racing was January 16 of that year.

On July 14, 2025, Amazon announced plans of transforming 84 acres to the west of Race Course property into a large fulfillment center, Close to the Atlantic City Expressway .

=== Selected list of races ===
All American Handicap
Boardwalk Handicap
Caesars International Handicap
Kelly-Olympic Handicap
Pageant Handicap
World’s Playground Stakes

== See also ==
- Gambling in New Jersey
