= William Steinkraus =

American equestrian

Personal information
- Born: William Clark Steinkraus; October 12, 1925 Cleveland, Ohio, U.S.
- Died: November 29, 2017 (aged 92)
Medal record
Equestrian
Representing the United States
Olympic Games
Gold medal – first place	1968 Mexico City	Individual jumping
Silver medal – second place	1960 Rome	Team jumping
Silver medal – second place	1972 Munich	Team jumping
Bronze medal – third place	1952 Helsinki	Team jumping
Pan American Games
Gold medal – first place	1959 Chicago	Individual jumping
Gold medal – first place	1959 Chicago	Team jumping
Gold medal – first place	1963 São Paulo	Team jumping
Silver medal – second place	1967 Winnipeg	Team jumping

William Clark Steinkraus (October 12, 1925 – November 29, 2017) was an American show jumping champion.

Steinkraus participated in five Olympic Games. At the 1968 Summer Olympics, held in Mexico City, he won a gold medal in individual jumping with the horse, Snowbound. He obtained two silver medals in Team Jumping, first in 1960 on his mount, Ksar d'Espirt, and 1972 on Main Spring. Steinkraus also won a bronze medal in Team Jumping at the 1952 Olympics in Helsinki, Finland on Hollandia. He was also slated to ride on the 1964 Olympic Team until his horse, Sinjon, was injured.

== Biography ==
Steinkraus was born in Cleveland, Ohio. He first rode at the age of ten while at summer camp, after which he took lessons with such well-known horsemen as Gordon Wright and Morton W. "Cappy" Smith. He rode sales horses for Smith, allowing him to hone his skills on various mounts. In 1941 Steinkraus reached the highest level of equitation competition when he won the ASPCA Maclay Cup in Hunter Seat Equitation and the Good Hands Finals in Saddle Seat Equitation at the National Horse Show.

Following his early successes, Steinkraus left to attend Yale University. After his first year of college, he joined the cavalry branch of the Army and was one of the final classes to receive their training on horseback. He was then shipped to Burma during World War II, where he served as part of the 124th Cavalry Regiment from 1943 to 1945. He then returned to the United States and finished his education at Yale, being graduated in 1949.

After college, Steinkraus focused on his riding career, and went on to join the Olympic team at the 1952 Helsinki Games. He also was a true amateur during this time, working as a businessman. Steinkraus retired from international competition at the end of 1972, following the show season, but continued to remain involved in the horse showing industry. This included involvement in the USET, either as president or chairman, from 1972 to 1992, and as an "Honorary Member" of the FEI Bureau. He also was a television commentator from 1976 to 1988 and a judge at the 1992 Olympic Games. As of 2008, he was still riding and playing chamber music.

He was married to Helen Ziegler, daughter of industrialist William Ziegler Jr. Helen died in 2012.

== Publications by Steinkraus ==
- Riding and Jumping (1961)
- The U.S. Equestrian Team Book of Riding (1976)
- Great Horses of the United States Equestrian Team (1977) (co-author: Sam Savitt)
- The Horse in Sport (1987)
- Reflections on Riding and Jumping (1991)

== See also ==
- List of athletes with the most appearances at Olympic Games
