= Trigo (horse) =

Irish-bred Thoroughbred racehorse

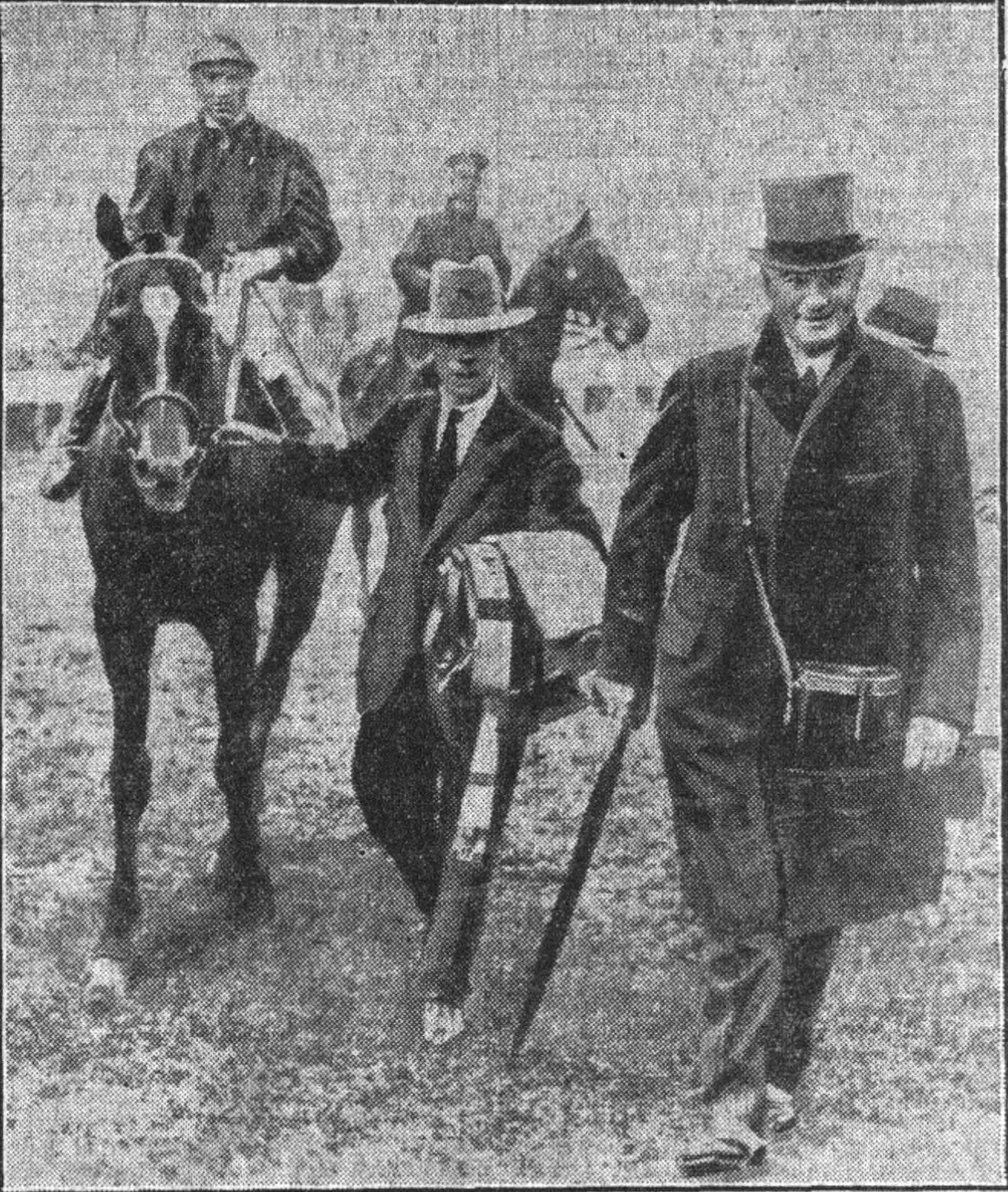
- Epsom Downs, 5th June 1929
- Sire: Blandford
- Grandsire: Swynford
- Dam: Athasi
- Damsire: Farasi
- Sex: Stallion
- Foaled: 1926
- Country: Ireland
- Colour: Bay
- Breeder: Cloghran Stud (William Barnett)
- Owner: William Barnett
- Trainer: Jack Rogers; Richard C. Dawson
- Record: 10: 6-1-1
- Earnings: £26,018

Major wins
- Phoenix Plate (1928); Anglesey Stakes (1928); Epsom Derby (1929); St. Leger Stakes (1929); Irish St. Leger (1929)

Honours
- Trigo Stakes at Leopardstown Racecourse; Trigo locomotive

Trigo (1926–1946) was an Irish-bred British-trained Thoroughbred racehorse and sire. In a career which lasted from 1928 until September 1929, he ran ten times and won six races. Trained in Ireland as a two-year-old, he was then sent to be trained in England. In 1929 he won The Derby and the St. Leger Stakes before returning to Ireland to win the Irish St. Leger. He was then retired to stud where he had limited success.

== Background ==
Trigo, a bay horse with a narrow white blaze was bred at the Cloghran Stud in County Dublin, Ireland by his owner, the Belfast grain merchant William Barnett. Barnett inherited the unfashionably-bred mare Athasi from his brother and bred her consistently to the stallion Blandford. In 1925, the pairing produced Athford, who won the Phoenix Plate and was then sent to be trained in England where his wins included the Doncaster Cup. Trigo arrived a year later. The same mating subsequently produced the Irish Derby winners Harinero and Primero. Blandford was a three-time Leading sire in Great Britain & Ireland who sired eleven British Classic Race winners including four who won The Derby. Barnett sent Trigo into training with Jack Rogers at the Curragh. The colt's name, which was pronounced "Trego", is the Spanish word for "wheat", reflecting his owner's business interests.

== Racing career ==
=== 1928: two-year-old season ===
As a two-year-old, Trigo proved himself one of the best of his generation in Ireland. He was unplaced in a five furlong race at the Curragh on his debut and then ran third in the Waterford Testimonial Stakes over the same course and distance. He then emulated his older brother by winning the Phoenix Plate at Phoenix Park from sixteen other juveniles and added the Anglesey Stakes over six furlongs at the Curragh, beating two moderate opponents at odds-on. Two days after his win in the Anglesey Stakes he ran again at the Curragh, this time in the Railway Stakes and finished second to the filly Soloptic, who was carrying fourteen pounds less weight. The value of this effort became evident the following year when Soloptic won the Irish 1000 Guineas and the Irish Oaks.

In autumn, Barnett sent Trigo to be trained in England by the Irish-born veteran Dick Dawson at Whatcombe, near Lambourn in Berkshire Rogers was sorry to see the horse leave, describing him as "the best colt that has ever left Ireland".

=== 1929: three-year-old season ===
In spring 1929 Barnett turned down an offer of £20,000 for the colt from the Aga Khan. Trigo made his first English appearance in April when he won the seven furlong 1929 Berkshire Handicap at Newbury Racecourse. Trigo performed well in exercise gallops and was described as "the best of the Whatcombe three-year-olds". He was strongly fancied for the 2000 Guineas at Newmarket a week later but after racing prominently he dropped away in the closing stages of the one mile Classic, finishing unplaced behind Mr Jinks.

Following his poor run at Newmarket, Trigo was not considered a serious contender for the Derby at Epsom on 5 June and he started at odds of 33/1 in a field of twenty-six runners. Mr Jinks started favourite ahead of Cragadour and Hunter's Moon, despite doubts about the 2000 Guineas winner's ability to stay the mile and a half distance. Dawson's stable jockey, Michael Beary elected to ride Le Voleur, leaving the mount on Trigo to the twenty-year-old apprentice jockey, Joe Marshall. On the day before the Derby the fine weather which had prevailed throughout the spring changed abruptly, and heavy, persistent rain altered the ground from firm to soft. Despite the miserable weather, the race attracted a record crowd, estimated at half a million. Marshall settled Trigo just behind the leaders in the early stages before moving up to dispute the lead with the well-fancied Hunter's Moon on the turn into the straight. Trigo went into a clear lead early in the straight and he was never seriously challenged, winning by one and a half lengths from Walter Gay, Brienz and Hunter's Moon. Marshall said after the race that he "never really had an uneasy moment". Barnett had made no secret of his confidence in Trigo, and many of his fellow Belfast residents backed the horse heavily.

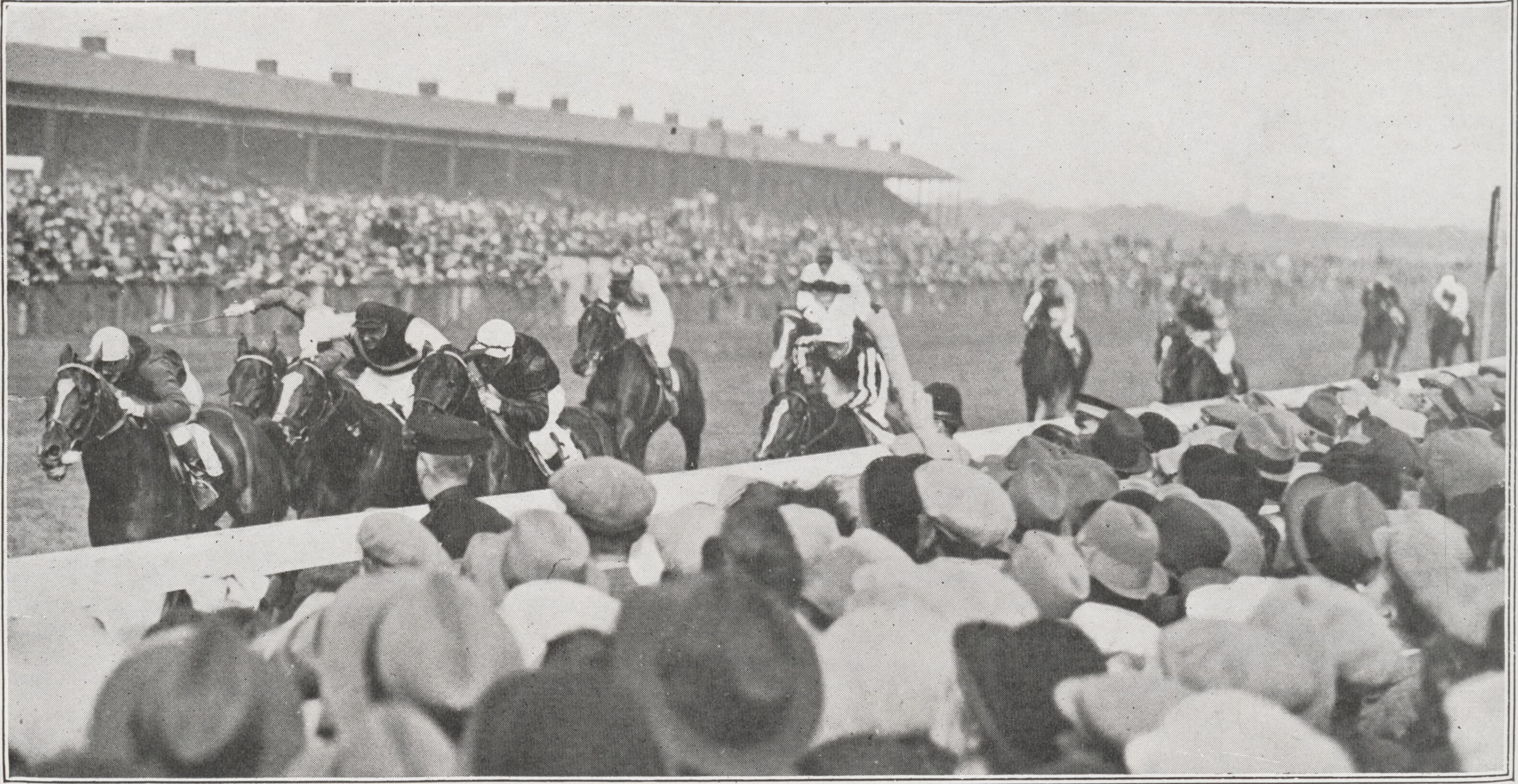
Trigo wins the St Leger 1929.

On 12 September at Doncaster, Trigo started at odds of 5/1 for the St Leger. Many observers had considered his Derby win to be a "fluke" and he was opposed in the betting by The Oaks winner Pennycomequick and the Grand Prix de Paris Hotweed, with Lord Derby's colt Bosworth also strongly fancied. Ridden on this occasion by Michael Beary, Trigo raced prominently before overtaking Bosworth in the straight and holding off a renewed challenge from Lord Derby's colt to win by a short head. The racing correspondent of The Times claimed that he had "never seen a gamer exhibition by two colts " than that provided by Trigo and Bosworth. Seven days later, he returned to Ireland for the Irish St Leger at the Curragh. Carrying a twelve pound weight penalty for his previous Classic victories he won in a close finish from Visellus.

== Stud career ==
Trigo was retired to his owner's Cloghran stud after his win in the Irish St Leger. He met with limited success, his best winners including Trigo Verde (Yorkshire Oaks), Harvest Star (Irish 1,000 Guineas) and Kerry Piper (Cesarewitch). He was later moved to the Aston Park stud, Aston Rowant, Oxfordshire where he died and was buried in 1946.

== Pedigree ==
Pedigree of Trigo (IRE), bay stallion, 1926
Sire Blandford (IRE) 1919	Swynford; 1907	John O'Gaunt	Isinglass
Sire Blandford (IRE) 1919	Swynford; 1907	John O'Gaunt	La Fleche*
Sire Blandford (IRE) 1919	Swynford; 1907	Canterbury Pilgrim	Tristan
Sire Blandford (IRE) 1919	Swynford; 1907	Canterbury Pilgrim	Pilgrimage
Sire Blandford (IRE) 1919	Blanche; 1912	White Eagle	Gallinule*
Sire Blandford (IRE) 1919	Blanche; 1912	White Eagle	Merry Gal
Sire Blandford (IRE) 1919	Blanche; 1912	Black Cherry	Bendigo
Sire Blandford (IRE) 1919	Blanche; 1912	Black Cherry	Black Duchess
Dam Athasi (GB) 1917	Farasi; 1903	Desmond	St Simon*
Dam Athasi (GB) 1917	Farasi; 1903	Desmond	L'Abbesse de Jouarre
Dam Athasi (GB) 1917	Farasi; 1903	Molly Morgan	Morgan
Dam Athasi (GB) 1917	Farasi; 1903	Molly Morgan	Sissie
Dam Athasi (GB) 1917	Athgreaney; 1910	Galloping Simon	Melton
Dam Athasi (GB) 1917	Athgreaney; 1910	Galloping Simon	Simena*
Dam Athasi (GB) 1917	Athgreaney; 1910	Fairyland	Lesterlin*
Dam Athasi (GB) 1917	Athgreaney; 1910	Fairyland	Stella (Family: 22-a)

* Trigo is inbred 5S x 4D x 5D to the stallion St Simon, meaning that he appears fifth generation (via La Fleche) on the sire side of his pedigree, and fourth generation and fifth generation (via Simena) on the dam side of his pedigree.

* Trigo is inbred 4S x 5D to the stallion Gallinule, meaning that he appears fourth generation on the sire side of his pedigree, and fifth generation (via Lesterlin) on the dam side of his pedigree.
