= Alycidon =

British-bred Thoroughbred racehorse

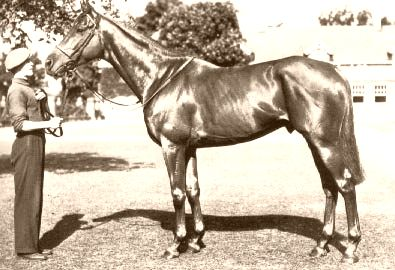
- Sire: Donatello II (FR)
- Grandsire: Blenheim (GB)
- Dam: Aurora (GB)
- Damsire: Hyperion
- Sex: Stallion
- Foaled: 1945
- Country: Great Britain
- Colour: Chestnut
- Breeder: Edward Stanley, 17th Earl of Derby
- Owner: Edward Stanley, 17th Earl of Derby; Edward Stanley, 18th Earl of Derby
- Trainer: Walter Earl
- Record: 17: 11-2-4
- Earnings: £37,206

Major wins
- Princess of Wales's Stakes (1948); Jockey Club Stakes (1948); King George VI Stakes; Ormonde Stakes (1949); Ascot Gold Cup (1949); Goodwood Cup (1949); Doncaster Cup (1949)

Awards
- Leading sire in Great Britain & Ireland (1955); Timeform rating 138

Honours
- Alycidon Stakes at Goodwood; Deltic locomotive 55009 was named Alycidon
- Last updated on 11 January 2010

Alycidon (1945–1963) was a British Thoroughbred racehorse who was described as "one of the greatest stayers in history". In a career which lasted from the autumn of 1947 until September 1949 he ran seventeen times and won eleven races. He was the second best British three-year-old of his generation, when he finished second to Black Tarquin in the St Leger Stakes. He was undefeated in his remaining seven races, defeating Black Tarquin in the 1949 Ascot Gold Cup and going on to win the Stayers' Triple Crown. After his retirement from racing he became the Leading sire in Great Britain & Ireland in 1955, despite having low fertility and a relatively short career at stud.

== Background ==
Alycidon was a chestnut horse bred by his owner the 17th Earl of Derby. He was sired by the outstanding racehorse and useful sire, Donatello II out of the 1,000 Guineas runner-up Aurora, a daughter of Hyperion. In addition to Alycidon, Aurora also produced Acropolis who ran third in The Derby, Agricola (Newmarket Stakes, leading sire in New Zealand), Borealis (sire of stakes winners) and others. Her other descendants include the Epsom Derby winner Larkspur and the Belmont Stakes winner Celtic Ash. Alycidon was inbred in the third and fourth generations (3x4) to Swynford.

The colt was sent into training with Walter Earl at Lord Derby's private Stanley House stable. Earl's stable jockey was Doug Smith, but Smith suffered from ill health and was not always available to ride Alycidon. Earl was also in failing health and died in 1950.

== Racing record ==
=== 1947: two-year-old season ===
Alycidon was extremely slow to mature and was not hurried by Earl. He made only two appearances, finishing unplaced in minor races over seven furlongs.

=== 1948: three-year-old season ===
Lord Derby died in February 1948 and the ownership of Alycidon passed to his grandson Edward Stanley, 18th Earl of Derby. As the family was in mourning, Alycidon was officially registered as being owned by Brigadier Fairfax-Ross for the early part of the season. On Alycidon's three-year-old debut he was ridden by Eph Smith in the Christopher Wren takes at Hurst Park Racecourse. The colt whipped around at the start (starting stalls were not used in Britain until 1965) and took no part in the race. After this display, Alycidon always raced in blinkers, although there appeared to be nothing irresolute about his racing. Two weeks after his "run" at Hurst Park, Alycidon recorded his first victory in the one mile Classic Trial Stakes at Thirsk Racecourse in which he was ridden by a stable lad named Shaw. In May he finished third in the Chester Vase and then won the Royal Standard Stakes at Manchester Racecourse.

Alycidon was regarded as a potential Derby contender, but as Lord Derby had two other colts in the race he was re-routed to Royal Ascot for the King Edward VII Stakes. He finished third to Vic Day, being apparently unsuited by the tactics employed by his jockey T. Lowrey, who restrained the colt before attempting to produce him with a late burst of speed. More positive tactics were used in the Princess of Wales's Stakes at Newmarket in July and he won decisively from the 1947 St Leger Stakes winner Sayajirao. Later in July he won the St George Stakes at Liverpool over thirteen furlongs, partnered for the first time by Doug Smith who rode him in all his remaining race.

In the St Leger Stakes on 11 September, Alycidon started at odds of 20/1 in a field of fourteen runners in front of a crowd estimated at 500,000 which included the King and Queen. Smith attempted to make all the running on Alycidon, but was caught inside the final quarter mile and beaten one and a half lengths by the American-bred Black Tarquin. Following his St Leger run, Alycidon returned to action at Newmarket where he won the Jockey Club Cup. On his final race of the year he was sent to Ascot for the two-mile King George VI Stakes, an important international event which attracted three French challengers. Alycidon tracked his pacemaker Benny Lynch, before taking the lead half a mile from the finish and drawing clear to win by five lengths.

=== 1949| four-year-old season ===
As a four-year-old Alycidon was aimed at the Ascot Gold Cup, in which he was scheduled for a highly anticipated rematch with Black Tarquin. On his debut he won the Ormonde Stakes by a length from Benny Lynch and then was more impressive when winning the Corporation Stakes at Doncaster by twelve lengths. Black Tarquin also won his prep races and was made 10/11 favourite for the Gold Cup ahead of Alycidon on 5/4. Alycidon was assisted by two pacemakers to ensure a true test of stamina and took the lead five furlongs from the finish. In the straight, Black Tarquin moved up to challenge and drew level a furlong from the finish, but Alycidon pulled away again in the closing stages to win by five lengths. His victory was notable as it came after a period in which the race had been dominated by foreign-bred horses.

In July he appeared to be unsuited by the firm ground, but still won the Goodwood Cup by two lengths from Riding Mill. He completed his career with an eight length success in the Doncaster Cup in September. By winning the Ascot, Goodwood and Doncaster Cups he completed the Stayers' Triple Crown, a feat that had not been achieved by any horse since Isonomy in 1879 and was not repeated until Le Moss won all three races in 1980. Alycidon retired with a tally of 11 wins worth £37,206 in prize money (he set a record for prize-money won by a non-Classic winner).

== Stud record ==
Alycidon was retired to stud in 1950 after being syndicated with a value of £120,000. His progeny enabled him to be top stallion in 1955 and he was placed in the top five on the sires list on five other occasions. He sired 19 stakeswinners for 34 stakeswins including the fine stayer Grey of Falloden (9 wins and £25,098) and other high-class fillies such as The Oaks winners Homeward Bound (£42,243) and Meld (British Fillies Triple Crown); Almeria plus these horses:

- Alcide, won St Leger Stakes, King George VI And Queen Elizabeth Stakes
- Alcimedes, Great Jubilee Handicap; a successful sire in New Zealand
- Almeria, won Yorkshire Oaks
- Gaul, won King Edward VII Stakes etc.
- Gloria Nicky, won Cheveley Park Stakes, dam of Never Too Late
- Khalekan, (stakeswinner and sire in Australia)
- Twilight Alley, won Ascot Gold Cup

After a successful early stud career, Alycidon began to suffer from low fertility and by 1962 he was getting fewer than one in three of his mares in foal. He was retired from stud duty in 1963 and was put down on 10 September 1963.

== Assessment and honours ==
Timeform gave Alycidon a rating of 138, placing him among the top twenty horses of the last sixty years. In 1949 he was rated equal with the three-year-old Abernant as the best horse of the year. Timeform described Alycidon as being "virtually unbeatable over extreme distances".

In their book A Century of Champions, John Randall and Tony Morris rated Alycidon the twentieth best horse of the 20th century trained in Britain and Ireland, and placed him forty-eighth in their global ranking. They described him as "the best specialist stayer of the century".

The Alycidon Stakes was named in honour of Alycidon in 1979, and its title was changed to the "Alycidon Glorious Stakes" in 1987, before this race was later known as the Glorious Stakes.

Following the London & North Eastern Railway tradition of naming locomotives after winning racehorses, British Railways "Deltic" Diesel locomotive no. D9009 (later 55009) was named after the horse on 21 July 1961, remained in service until 2 January 1982, and is today preserved.

== Pedigree ==
Pedigree of Alycidon (GB), chestnut stallion, 1945
Sire Donatello II 1934	Blenheim; 1927	Blandford	Swynford*
Sire Donatello II 1934	Blenheim; 1927	Blandford	Blanche
Sire Donatello II 1934	Blenheim; 1927	Malva	Charles o'Malley
Sire Donatello II 1934	Blenheim; 1927	Malva	Wild Arum
Sire Donatello II 1934	Delleana; 1925	Clarissimus	Radium
Sire Donatello II 1934	Delleana; 1925	Clarissimus	Quintessence
Sire Donatello II 1934	Delleana; 1925	Duccia di Buoninsegna	Bridge of Earn
Sire Donatello II 1934	Delleana; 1925	Duccia di Buoninsegna	Dutch Mary
Dam Aurora 1936	Hyperion; 1930	Gainsborough	Bayardo
Dam Aurora 1936	Hyperion; 1930	Gainsborough	Rosedrop
Dam Aurora 1936	Hyperion; 1930	Selene	Chaucer*
Dam Aurora 1936	Hyperion; 1930	Selene	Serenissima
Dam Aurora 1936	Rose Red; 1924	Swynford*	John O'Gaunt*
Dam Aurora 1936	Rose Red; 1924	Swynford*	Canterbury Pilgrim*
Dam Aurora 1936	Rose Red; 1924	Marchetta	Marco
Dam Aurora 1936	Rose Red; 1924	Marchetta	Hettie Sorrel (Family: 1-w)

* Alycidon is inbred 4S x 3D to the stallion Swynford, meaning that he appears fourth generation on the sire side of his pedigree, and third generation on the dam side of his pedigree.

* Alycidon is inbred 5S x 5D x 4D to the mare Canterbury Pilgrim, meaning that she appears fifth generation (via Swynford) on the sire side of his pedigree, and fifth generation (via Chaucer) and fourth generation on the dam side of his pedigree.
