= Ocean Wave =

American-bred Thoroughbred racehorse

- Sire: Blenheim
- Grandsire: Blandford
- Dam: Columbiana
- Damsire: Petee-Wrack
- Sex: Stallion
- Foaled: 1940
- Country: United States
- Color: Chestnut
- Breeder: Calumet Farm
- Owner: Calumet Farm
- Trainer: Ben A. Jones
- Record: 24: 13-5-0
- Earnings: $37,825

Major wins
- Sagamore Handicap (1942); Gulf Coast Stakes (1943); Blue Grass Stakes (1943); Derby Trial Stakes (1943)

Ocean Wave (born 1940) was an American Thoroughbred racehorse who was a main rival of Count Fleet in the early 1940s. Owned by Calumet Farm, he was trained by Ben Jones and owned by Warren Wright, Ocean Wave was the son of Blenheim and Columbiana. He developed into a come from behind threat as a two-year-old and a three-year-old.

== Noteworthy achievements ==
In a six furlong event at Aqueduct Racetrack on September 18, 1942, Ocean Wave won a race despite the deep footing and sloppy conditions. Running against Hyperion, a speedy colt, he lost much ground coming into the stretch. It cost him the lead but he overtook Sea Fare and won by three lengths. Ocean Wave's winning time was 1:12 flat.

On October 9, 1942, Ocean Wave won the Balladier Purse down the Widener chute at Belmont Park. As the favorite in a field of ten, he won by five lengths, completing the six furlongs in 1:10 flat. He came within 4/5 of a second of the track record.

In the $2,765 Sagamore Handicap at Pimlico Race Course on November 5, 1942, Ocean Wave came from behind to win. This triumph was achieved in competition against five other two-year-olds. He covered the six furlongs in a time of 1:12 2/5.

Ocean Wave decisively defeated six other highly rated thoroughbreds at Oaklawn Park on March 22, 1943. He came from last place to win the $1,000 Ouachita Purse, a six furlong prep for thoroughbreds eligible for the Arkansas Derby.

== Injured prior to 1943 Kentucky Derby ==
Arthur Daley correctly predicted Count Fleet's triumph in the May 1943 Kentucky Derby. He pointed out Blue Swords and Ocean Wave as his primary competitors in the event. Count Fleet had defeated both of them previously. The Kentucky fans favored Ocean Wave after he ran the half mile at Churchill Downs in 0:51 2/5 and five furlongs in 1:04 3/5 on April 13, 1943. The times were achieved despite running on a heavy track.

In March of his three-year-old season, Ocean Wave won the Gulf Coast Stakes at Fair Grounds Race Course in New Orleans. After winning the Kentucky Derby Trial Stakes on April 28, 1943, Jones told Wright that if Count Fleet makes one mistake, we'll beat him. Ocean Wave's left front foot was heavily bandaged on the morning of April 29, 1943. Jones remarked that he had no intention of removing it from its packing until April 30. The colt was limping following his win in the Derby Trial. Jones described the injury as a flesh wound only, with no damage to the bone having been sustained. Reporter Al Wolf noted that Ocean Wave had a cracked heel prior to competing.

Ocean Wave was assigned the #10 post position for the Kentucky Derby, being given 4 to 1 odds of winning. In mid afternoon on May 1, 1943, owner Wright decided to remove Ocean Wave from competing in the event.
