= Mameluke (American horse) =

American-bred Thoroughbred racehorse

- Sire: Mahmoud
- Grandsire: Blenheim
- Dam: Schwester
- Damsire: Pennant
- Sex: Stallion
- Foaled: 1948
- Country: United States
- Colour: Bay
- Breeder: Cornelius Vanderbilt Whitney
- Owner: Cornelius Vanderbilt Whitney
- Trainer: Sylvester Veitch
- Record: 26: 6-0-3
- Earnings: US$61,675

Major wins
- Blue Grass Stakes (1951); Metropolitan Handicap (1952)
- Last updated on June 19, 2010

Mameluke (foaled 1948) was an American Thoroughbred race horse. Bred and raced by Cornelius Vanderbilt Whitney, he was out of the mare, Schwester, and was sired by the 1936 Epsom Derby winner, Mahmoud who became the Leading sire in North America in 1946 and the Leading broodmare sire in North America in 1957.

Ridden by jockey Raymond Adair, and trained by Sylvester Veitch, Mameluke won a division of the 1951 Blue Grass Stakes but in that year's Kentucky Derby, the horse slowed badly before being pulled up sore and finishing last.

In 1952, Mameluke won the Metropolitan Handicap and ran third in the Suburban Handicap.
