= Snowbound (horse) =

- Breed: Thoroughbred
- Discipline: Show jumping
- Sire: Hail Victory
- Dam: Gay Alvena
- Foaled: 1958
- Color: Dark bay
- Trainer: Bill Steinkraus

Major wins
- Individual gold medal, 1968 Olympics

Honors
- Inducted into Show Jumping Hall of Fame in 2005

Snowbound (March 21, 1958 - December 16, 1989) was the first horse to be ridden to an Olympic individual gold medal by an American rider. The rider was Bill Steinkraus at the 1968 Summer Olympics in Mexico City.

== Life and career ==
Snowbound was foaled in California in 1958. He was a dark bay Thoroughbred, standing 16.1 hands (65 inches, 165 cm) high. He was sired by Hail Victory and out of the mare Gay Alvena; his registered name was Gay Vic. He was used as a racehorse for several years in California, before being sold to Hall of Fame show jumper Barbara Worth Oakford. By that time, Snowbound had suffered two tendon injuries in his legs. Oakford said that the horse "might as well be snowbound as to think he'd make a show horse" and the name Snowbound stuck. In 1964, Snowbound was seen at a show by Sir John Galvin, who purchased him for the United States Equestrian Team. Snowbound soon became the mount of show jumping rider William "Bill" Steinkraus.

In 1965, Snowbound and Steinkraus won four FEI Nations Cups, and by the summer of 1968, Snowbound had made clear rounds in 15 of the 16 Nations Cups he had competed in. Snowbound's tendon injuries flared up again from time to time throughout his show career, and at each recurrence Steinkraus rested the horse until he was completely sound. Snowbound was not jumped in small shows, but saved for large competitions. He and Steinkraus were named to the US Olympic team in 1968, and competed in the Mexico City Olympic Games. Snowbound was one of only two horses to go clear in the first round of the Olympics. In the next round, no horse went clear. During the final round of the competition, Steinkraus felt that something was not right when Snowbound jumped the penultimate fence. However, he finished the course with a clean round and the best time, winning the individual gold. At the end of the course, Snowbound came up lame with a recurrence of his tendon problem, and left the ring on three legs. He and Steinkraus were the first American horse and rider to win an individual gold medal in Olympic equestrian competition. At the age of 14, Snowbound was retired to Galvin's farm outside Dublin.

On April 2, 2005, Snowbound was inducted into the Show Jumping Hall of Fame.
