= All American Handicap =

- Class: Defunct horse race
- Location: Atlantic City Race Course, Atlantic City, New Jersey, United States
- Inaugurated: 1946
- Race type: Thoroughbred - Flat racing

Race information
- Distance: 1 1/4 miles (8.5 furlongs)
- Surface: Dirt
- Track: Left-handed
- Qualification: Three-year-olds & up
- Purse: $25,000

The All American Handicap was a Thoroughbred horse race held annually from 1946 through 1952 at Atlantic City Race Course in Mays Landing, New Jersey. An event for horses of either sex age three and older, it was run on a dirt track over a distance of 1 3/16 miles from 1946 through 1950 after which it was increased to the "Derby" distance of 1 1/4 miles.

While an important race for the Atlantic City Race Course, the track was at a disadvantage purse-wise when it came to attracting the leading racing stables located only a two-hour drive away at Aqueduct Race Track and Belmont Park, two big tracks in the New York City area that, at the same time, hosted somewhat similar events. 1952 would mark the last time the All American Handicap would be run.

== Historical race notes ==
Future U.S. Racing Hall of Fame jockey James Stout rode Turbine to victory in the 1946 inaugural running of the All American Handicap, doing so in track record time for the mile and three sixteenths distance on dirt. Prior to that, Turbine had already set the Atlantic City track record for a mile and one sixteenth on dirt. The following year, under jockey Michael Basile, Turbine would set his third track record. This time over a distance of a mile and one-eighth at Havre de Grace Racetrack in Maryland.

The 1948 winner, Rampart, owned by Mrs. Helene Haggerty, was the only filly to ever win the All American Handicap.

In the 1950 edition of the All American Handicap, Dart By and Three Rings finished in a Dead Heat for first.

== Records ==
Speed record:

- 2:01.60 - Greek Ship (1952) at 11/4 miles
- 1:57.60 - Turbine (1946) at 13/16 miles

Most wins:

- 2 - Greek Ship (1951, 1952)

Most wins by a jockey:

- No jockey won this race more than once

Most wins by a trainer:

- 3 - Preston M. Burch (1950, 1951, 1952)

Most wins by an owner:

- 3 - Brookmeade Stable (1950, 1951, 1952)

== Winners ==
Year	Winner	Age	Jockey	Trainer	Owner	Dist. (Miles)	Time	Win $
1952	Greek Ship	5	Joe Culmone	Preston M. Burch	Brookmeade Stable	11/4 M	2:03.20	$19,450
1951	Greek Ship	4	Ronnie Nash	Preston M. Burch	Brookmeade Stable	11/4 M	2:01.60	$19,700
1950	Dart By (DH)	5	Fernando Fernandez	Preston M. Burch	Brookmeade Stable	11/4 M	2:03.60	$12,212
1950	Three Rings DH	5	Hedley Woodhouse	Willie Knapp	Mrs. Evelyn L. Hopkins	11/4 M	2:03.60	$12,212
1949	Better Self	4	John Gilbert	Max Hirsch	King Ranch	13/16 M	1:59.00	$18,275
1948	Rampart	6	Mike Basile	Richard "Whitey" Nixon	Mrs. Helene K. Haggerty	13/16 M	1:59.20	$11,375
1947	Talon	5	John Adams	Horatio Luro	Richard N. Ryan	13/16 M	2:00.20	$22,450
1946	Turbine	4	James Stout	P. Da Lee Watts	Mrs. Helen Lebowitz	13/16 M	1:57.60	$22,500
