= 1976 Kentucky Derby =

Horse race

102nd Kentucky Derby
- Kentucky Derby
- Grade I stakes race
- Location: Churchill Downs
- Date: May 1, 1976
- Winning horse: Bold Forbes
- Jockey: Angel Cordero Jr.
- Trainer: Laz Barrera
- Owner: Estéban Rodriguez Tizol
- Conditions: Fast
- Surface: Dirt
- Attendance: 115,387

The 1976 Kentucky Derby was the 102nd running of the Kentucky Derby. The race took place on May 1, 1976, with 115,387 people in attendance.

== Full results ==
Finished	Post	Horse	Jockey	Trainer	Owner	Time / behind
1st	2	Bold Forbes	Angel Cordero Jr.	Laz Barrera	E. Rodriguez Tizol	2:01 3/5
2nd	5	Honest Pleasure	Braulio Baeza	LeRoy Jolley	Bertram R. Firestone	
3rd	3	Elocutionist	John L. Lively	Paul T. Adwell	Eugene C. Cashman	
4th	6	Amano	Larry Melancon	James A. Padgett	James C. Irvin	
5th	1	On the Sly	Gregg McCarron	Milton W. "Mel" Gross	Balmak Stable (Mary Streit)	
6th	7	Cojak	Chris McCarron	Sonny Hine	Entremont Stable (Jean R. Poirier, Al Cohen, Dave Weinberg)	
7th	9	Inca Roca	William Nemeti	A .T. Skinner	Charles Raymond Jarrell	
8th	8	Play the Red	Jorge Velásquez	John P. Campo	Elmendorf	
9th	4	Bidson	Don MacBeth	Anthony Battaglia	Sared Racing Stable (Edward Ways)	

- Winning Breeder: Eaton Farms Inc. & Red Bull Stable; (KY)
