= 1976 Preakness Stakes =

101st running of the Preakness Stakes

101st Preakness Stakes
- The Preakness Stakes
- Location: Pimlico Race Course, Baltimore, Maryland, United States
- Date: May 15, 1976
- Winning horse: Elocutionist
- Jockey: John L. Lively
- Conditions: Fast
- Surface: Dirt

The 1976 Preakness Stakes was the 101st running of the $200,000 Grade 1 Preakness Stakes thoroughbred horse race. The race took place on May 15, 1976, and was televised in the United States on the CBS television network. Elocutionist, who was jockeyed by John L. Lively, won the race by three and one half lengths over runner-up Play The Red. Approximate post time was 5:40 p.m. Eastern Time. The race was run on a fast track in a final time of 1:55 flat. The Maryland Jockey Club reported total attendance of 62,256, this is recorded as second highest on the list of American thoroughbred racing top attended events for North America in 1976.

== Payout ==
The 101st Preakness Stakes Payout Schedule

Program Number	Horse Name	Win	Place	Show
4	Elocutionist	US$22.20	$8.20	$3.60
2	Play the Red	-	$20.20	$6.00
1A	Bold Forbes	-	-	$2.80

$2 Exacta: (4–2) paid $347.40

== The full chart ==
Finish Position	Margin (lengths)	Post Position	Horse name	Jockey	Trainer	Owner	Post Time Odds	Purse Earnings
1st	0	4	Elocutionist	John L. Lively	Paul T. Adwell	Eugene C. Cashman	10.10-1	$129,700
2nd	31/2	2	Play the Red	Jean Cruguet	John P. Campo	Elmendorf Farm	26.20-1	$30,000
3rd	4	1A	Bold Forbes	Ángel Cordero Jr.	Laz Barrera	E. Rodriguez Tizol	1.10-1	$15,000
4th	7	3	Cojak	Anthony Agnello	Hubert Hine	Entremont Stable	12.20-1	$7,500
5th	71/4	5	Honest Pleasure	Braulio Baeza	LeRoy Jolley	Bertram R. Firestone	0.90-1 favorite	
6th	111/4	1	Life's Hope	Sandy Hawley	Laz Barrera	Harbor View Farm	1.10-1	

- Winning Breeder: Pin Oak Stud (KY)
- Winning Time: 1:55 0/0
- Track Condition: Fast
- Total Attendance: 62,256
