= Mercedes Won =

American thoroughbred racehorse

- Sire: Air Forbes Won
- Grandsire: Bold Forbes
- Dam: Bye Bye Mercedes
- Damsire: Roman Line
- Sex: Stallion
- Foaled: 1986
- Country: United States
- Color: Bay
- Breeder: Oscar T. Penn Jr.
- Owner: Christopher Spencer
- Trainer: Arnold W. Fink
- Record: 52:12-7-12
- Earnings: $1,087,435

Major wins
- Swynford Stakes (1988); Hopeful Stakes (1988); Sanford Stakes (1988); Florida Derby (1989); Rochester Cup Handicap (1990)
- Last updated on June 20, 2020

Mercedes Won (March 29, 1986 - October 16, 2008) was an American Thoroughbred racehorse and the winner of the 1988 Hopeful Stakes.

== Career ==
Mercedes Won's first race was on March 29, 1986, at Tampa Bay Downs, where he came in 8th. He captured his first win on July 23, 1988, at Woodbine.

In his first stakes race on August 6, 1988, he won the Swynford Stakes, then followed that up with his first graded win on August 17, 1988, in the Sanford Stakes. Mercedes win streak continued with a win in the August 27 1988 Hopeful Stakes.

Mercedes grabbed another win at the 1988 Grey Stakes, but would go winless until March 4, 1989, when he won the Florida Derby.

Mercedes competed in the 1989 Haskell Invitational Stakes in which he finished in 7th place.

On August 26, 1990, Mercedes won the Rochester Cup Handicap. This would be Mercedes Won's last big win, as he only won allowance races thereafter.

Mercedes Won's last race took place on November 6, 1991, with a third place finish at the Wadsworth Memorial Handicap.

== Death ==
Mercedes Won was euthanized on October 16, 2008, due to cancer.

== Pedigree ==
Pedigree of Mercedes Won (USA), 1986
Sire Air Forbes Won (USA) 1979	Bold Forbes (UA); 1973	Irish Castle	Bold Ruler
Sire Air Forbes Won (USA) 1979	Bold Forbes (UA); 1973	Irish Castle	Castle Forbes
Sire Air Forbes Won (USA) 1979	Bold Forbes (UA); 1973	Comely Nell	Commodore M.
Sire Air Forbes Won (USA) 1979	Bold Forbes (UA); 1973	Comely Nell	Nellie L
Sire Air Forbes Won (USA) 1979	Bronze Point (USA); 1973	Tobin Bronze	Arctic Explorer
Sire Air Forbes Won (USA) 1979	Bronze Point (USA); 1973	Tobin Bronze	Amarco
Sire Air Forbes Won (USA) 1979	Bronze Point (USA); 1973	Summer Point	Summer Tan
Sire Air Forbes Won (USA) 1979	Bronze Point (USA); 1973	Summer Point	Point Count
Dam Bye Bye Mercedes (USA) 1980	Roman Line (USA); 1959	Roman	Sir Gallahad
Dam Bye Bye Mercedes (USA) 1980	Roman Line (USA); 1959	Roman	Buckup
Dam Bye Bye Mercedes (USA) 1980	Roman Line (USA); 1959	Lurline B.	Alibhai
Dam Bye Bye Mercedes (USA) 1980	Roman Line (USA); 1959	Lurline B.	Belle Cane
Dam Bye Bye Mercedes (USA) 1980	Menedict (CAN); 1960	Menetrier	Fair Copy
Dam Bye Bye Mercedes (USA) 1980	Menedict (CAN); 1960	Menetrier	La Melodie
Dam Bye Bye Mercedes (USA) 1980	Menedict (CAN); 1960	Queen's Statute	Le Lavandou
Dam Bye Bye Mercedes (USA) 1980	Menedict (CAN); 1960	Queen's Statute	Statute
