= 1976 in sports =

1976 in sports describes the year's events in world sport.

== Alpine skiing ==
- Alpine Skiing World Cup
  - Men's overall season champion: Ingemar Stenmark, Sweden
  - Women's overall season champion: Rosi Mittermaier, West Germany

== American football ==
- January 18 – Super Bowl X: the Pittsburgh Steelers (AFC) won 21−17 over the Dallas Cowboys (NFC)
  - Location: Miami Orange Bowl
  - Attendance: 80,187
  - MVP: Lynn Swann, WR (Pittsburgh)
- Lee Roy Selmon is selected as the first overall pick in the NFL draft. (April 8)
- Seattle Seahawks founded.
- Tampa Bay Buccaneers founded.
- Orange Bowl (1975 season):
  - The Oklahoma Sooners won 14–6 over the Michigan Wolverines to win the college football national championship
- Tony Dorsett is awarded the Heisman Trophy (November 30).

== Association football ==
- England – FA Cup – Southampton won 1–0 over Manchester United
- Stevenage F.C. were established
- Italy – Torino win Serie A for the first time since the Superga air disaster wiped out the team 27 years before.
- 1976 European Championship – Czechoslovakia beat West Germany 5–3 on penalties to win, after the game had ended 2–2 after extra time.

== Athletics ==
- July – Athletics at the 1976 Summer Olympics held at Montreal

== Australian rules football ==
- Victorian Football League
  - Hawthorn wins the 80th VFL Premiership (Hawthorn 13.22 (100) d North Melbourne 10.10 (70))
  - Brownlow Medal awarded to Graham Moss (Essendon)

== Baseball ==
- April 17 – Mike Schmidt of the Philadelphia Phillies hits four consecutive home runs in a game against the Chicago Cubs.
- April 25 – Chicago Cubs outfielder Rick Monday rescues an American flag just as two protesters are about to burn it in the outfield during a game at Dodger Stadium.
- Sparky Lyle of the New York Yankees breaks Hoyt Wilhelm's American League record of 154 career saves.
- World Series – The Cincinnati Reds (aka the "Big Red Machine") sweep the New York Yankees, 4 games to 0, to win their second straight championship.

== Basketball ==
- NCAA Division I Men's Basketball Championship –
  - Indiana wins 86–68 over Michigan
- NBA Finals –
  - Boston Celtics win 4 games to 2 over the Phoenix Suns
- 1976 ABA Playoffs –
  - New York Nets defeat Denver Nuggets 4 games to 2
- American Basketball Association merges with the National Basketball Association. Of the seven remaining teams in the ABA, the Virginia Squires fold, Kentucky Colonels and Spirits of St. Louis are bought out, and the remaining four teams (San Antonio Spurs, Denver Nuggets, New York Nets, and Indiana Pacers) join the NBA

== Boxing ==
- May 22 – death of Oscar Bonavena (34), Argentinian heavyweight, who was shot in Reno, Nevada
- September 28 in Yankee Stadium, Bronx, New York Muhammad Ali won a controversial 15-round decision over Ken Norton to keep his World Heavyweight title.
- October 8 in São Paulo, Brazil, former world featherweight champion Eder Jofre fought his last fight, outpointing Mexico's Octavio (Famoso) Gomez in ten rounds.

== Canadian football ==
- Grey Cup – Ottawa Rough Riders won 23–20 over the Saskatchewan Roughriders
- Vanier Cup – Western Ontario Mustangs won 29–13 over the Acadia Axemen

== Cycling ==
- Giro d'Italia won by Felice Gimondi of Italy
- Tour de France – Lucien Van Impe of Belgium
- UCI Road World Championships – Men's road race – Freddy Maertens of Belgium

== Dogsled racing ==
- Iditarod Trail Sled Dog Race Champion –
  - Gerald Riley won with lead dogs: Puppy & Sugar

== Field hockey ==
- Olympic Games (Men's Competition) in Montreal won by New Zealand
- Women's World Cup in Berlin won by West Germany

== Figure skating ==
- World Figure Skating Championships –
  - Men's champion: John Curry, Britain
  - Ladies' champion: Dorothy Hamill, United States
  - Pair skating champions: Irina Rodnina & Alexander Zaitsev, Soviet Union
  - Ice dancing champions: Lyudmila Pakhomova & Alexandr Gorshkov, Soviet Union

== Golf ==
Men's professional

- Masters Tournament – Raymond Floyd
- U.S. Open – Jerry Pate
- British Open – Johnny Miller
- PGA Championship – Dave Stockton
- PGA Tour money leader – Jack Nicklaus – $266,439

Men's amateur

- British Amateur – Dick Siderowf
- U.S. Amateur – Bill Sander

Women's professional

- LPGA Championship – Betty Burfeindt
- U.S. Women's Open – JoAnne Carner
- LPGA Tour money leader – Judy Rankin – $150,734, she is the first to ever earn more than $100,000 in a season.

== Harness racing ==
- United States Pacing Triple Crown races –
  1. Cane Pace – Keystone Ore
  2. Little Brown Jug – Keystone Ore
  3. Messenger Stakes – Windshield Wiper
- United States Trotting Triple Crown races –
  1. Hambletonian – Steve Lobell
  2. Yonkers Trot – Steve Lobell
  3. Kentucky Futurity – Quick Pay
- Australian Inter Dominion Harness Racing Championship –
  - Pacers: Carclew
  - Trotters: Bay Johnny

== Horse racing ==
Steeplechases

- Cheltenham Gold Cup – Royal Frolic
- Grand National – Rag Trade

Flat races

- Australia – Melbourne Cup won by Van der Hum
- Canada – Queen's Plate won by Norcliffe
- France – Prix de l'Arc de Triomphe won by Ivanjica
- Ireland – Irish Derby Stakes won by Malacate
- English Triple Crown Races:
  1. 2,000 Guineas Stakes – Wollow
  2. The Derby – Empery
  3. St. Leger Stakes – Crow
- United States Triple Crown Races:
  1. Kentucky Derby – Bold Forbes
  2. Preakness Stakes – Elocutionist
  3. Belmont Stakes – Bold Forbes

== Ice hockey ==
- Art Ross Trophy as the NHL's leading scorer during the regular season: Guy Lafleur, Montreal Canadiens
- Hart Memorial Trophy for the NHL's Most Valuable Player: Bobby Clarke – Philadelphia Flyers
- Stanley Cup – Montreal Canadiens win 4 games to 0 over the Philadelphia Flyers
- World Hockey Championship –
  - Men's champion: Czechoslovakia defeated the Soviet Union
- Avco World Trophy – Winnipeg Jets win 4 games to 0 over the Houston Aeros
- NCAA Men's Ice Hockey Championship – University of Minnesota-Twin Cities Golden Gophers defeat Michigan Technological University Huskies 6–4 in Denver, Colorado

== Rugby league ==
- 29 June – the World Club Challenge concept is trialled as English champions St. Helens travel to Sydney to play Australian champions Eastern Suburbs. Easts defeat St Helens 25–2 in the one-off match.
- 18 August – the 1976 Amco Cup tournament culminates in Balmain's 21–7 win over North Sydney in the final
- 18 September – the 1976 NSWRFL season culminates in Manly-Warringah's 13–10 win over Parramatta in the Grand Final

== Rugby union ==
- 82nd Five Nations Championship series is won by Wales who complete the Grand Slam

== Snooker ==
- World Snooker Championship – Ray Reardon beats Alex Higgins 27–16
- World rankings are introduced. Ray Reardon becomes the first world number one, for 1976/77.

== Swimming ==
- July 18 to July 25 – XXI Olympic Games, held in Montreal
- August 14 – United States's Jonty Skinner sets the first official world record in the 50m freestyle in Philadelphia, clocking 23.86

== Tennis ==
- Grand Slam in tennis men's results:
  1. Australian Open – Mark Edmondson
  2. French Open – Adriano Panatta
  3. Wimbledon championships – Björn Borg
  4. U.S. Open – Jimmy Connors
- Grand Slam in tennis women's results:
  1. Australian Open – Evonne Goolagong Cawley
  2. French Open – Sue Barker
  3. Wimbledon championships – Chris Evert
  4. U.S. Open – Chris Evert
- Davis Cup – Italy wins 4–1 over Chile in world tennis.

== Water polo ==
- Water polo at the 1976 Summer Olympics in Montréal won by Hungary

== General sporting events ==
- 1976 Summer Olympics takes place in Montreal, Quebec, Canada
  - USSR wins the most medals (125), and the most gold medals (49).
- 1976 Winter Olympics takes place in Innsbruck, Austria
  - USSR wins the most medals (27), and the most gold medals (13).
- Fifth Pan Arab Games held in Damascus, Syria

== Awards ==
- Associated Press Male Athlete of the Year – Caitlyn Jenner (then Bruce), (Note: Jenner changed her name due to gender transition in 2015.) Track and field
- Associated Press Female Athlete of the Year – Nadia Comăneci, Gymnastics
- ABC's Wide World of Sports Athlete of the Year: Nadia Comăneci, Gymnastics
