= Pine Circle =

American-bred Thoroughbred racehorse

- Sire: Cox's Ridge
- Grandsire: Best Turn
- Dam: Gaebale
- Damsire: Gallant Man
- Sex: Stallion
- Foaled: 1981
- Country: United States
- Colour: Dark Bay/Brown
- Breeder: Loblolly Stable
- Owner: Loblolly Stable
- Trainer: Claude R. McGaughey III
- Record: 29: 4-4-8
- Earnings: US$598,191

Major wins
- Hawthorne Juvenile Stakes (1983); Widener Handicap (1985)

Pine Circle (foaled April 21, 1981 in Kentucky) was an American Thoroughbred racehorse. Owned and bred by Loblolly Stable and trained by Hall of Famer Shug McGaughey, he achieved success in a number of Graded stakes races in America.

Pine Circle was a "closer" and fond of going a distance. Typically, he broke rather slowly, trailed the pack, then finished strongly off-the-pace with little need of encouragement. He insisted on being in control and ran his best race when allowed to do so. He was a contender in the 1984 Triple Crown events, finishing 6th in the Kentucky Derby, 5th in the Preakness Stakes, and 2nd to winner Swale in the Belmont Stakes.

Pine Circle's most important win came in 1985 at Hialeah Park in Florida when Don MacBeth rode him to victory in the Grade 1 Widener Handicap. Other notable race finishes by Pine Circle include his wins in the Hawthorne Juvenile Stakes; 2nd places in the Arkansas Derby and Travers Stakes; and 3rd showings in the Brooklyn Handicap, Gulfstream Park Handicap, Oaklawn Handicap, and Secretariat Stakes.

The colt retired with lifetime earnings of $598,191 and a racing record of 4-4-8 in 29 career starts. At the age of 7, Pine Circle was sent to Australia to stand at stud, producing a number of successful racing progeny "Down Under."
