= Yanks Music =

American thoroughbred racehorse

- Sire: Air Forbes Won
- Grandsire: Bold Forbes
- Dam: Traipsing
- Damsire: Darby Creek Road
- Sex: Mare
- Foaled: 1993
- Country: USA
- Colour: Bay
- Breeder: Irish American Bloodhorse Agency, Ltd.
- Owner: Audrey H. Cooper & Michael Fennessy
- Trainer: Leo O'Brien
- Record: 9:7-2-0
- Earnings: $787,600

Major wins
- Alabama Stakes (1996); Beldame Stakes (1996); Mother Goose Stakes (1996); Ruffian Stakes (1996)

Awards
- American Champion Three-Year-Old Filly (1996)

Yanks Music (May 31, 1993 - May 15, 2008) was an American National Champion Thoroughbred racehorse and the winner of the 1996 Alabama Stakes.

== Career ==
Yanks Music's first race was on November 5, 1995, at New York's Aqueduct Racetrack where she came in first.

She then won her next two races at the Aqueduct track in November 1995 and April 1996. She competed in her first Graded stakes race, the 1996 Acorn Stakes, coming in 2nd place. The filly then won her first Graded stakes race, the Mother Goose Stakes, on June 22, 1996. To that she added the 1996 Alabama Stakes on August 17 and then won the Ruffian Stakes on September 14.

Yanks Music won the final race of her career when she captured the 1996 Beldame Stakes.

== Death ==
Foaling a bout with colic, Yanks Music was euthanized on May 15, 2008, due to intestinal problems.

== Pedigree ==
Pedigree of Yanks Music (USA), 1993
Sire Air Forbes Won (USA) 1979	Bold Forbes (USA); 1973	Irish Castle	Bold Ruler
Sire Air Forbes Won (USA) 1979	Bold Forbes (USA); 1973	Irish Castle	Castle Forbes
Sire Air Forbes Won (USA) 1979	Bold Forbes (USA); 1973	Comely Nell	Commodore M.
Sire Air Forbes Won (USA) 1979	Bold Forbes (USA); 1973	Comely Nell	Nellie L.
Sire Air Forbes Won (USA) 1979	Bronze Point (USA); 1973	Tobin Bronze	Arctic Explorer
Sire Air Forbes Won (USA) 1979	Bronze Point (USA); 1973	Tobin Bronze	Amarco
Sire Air Forbes Won (USA) 1979	Bronze Point (USA); 1973	Summer Point	Summer Tan
Sire Air Forbes Won (USA) 1979	Bronze Point (USA); 1973	Summer Point	Point Count
Dam Traipsing (USA) 1985	Darby Creek Road (USA); 1973	Roberto	Hail To Reason
Dam Traipsing (USA) 1985	Darby Creek Road (USA); 1973	Roberto	Bramalea
Dam Traipsing (USA) 1985	Darby Creek Road (USA); 1973	On the Trail	Olympia
Dam Traipsing (USA) 1985	Darby Creek Road (USA); 1973	On the Trail	Golden Trail
Dam Traipsing (USA) 1985	Boasting (USA); 1969	Bold Lad	Bold Ruler
Dam Traipsing (USA) 1985	Boasting (USA); 1969	Bold Lad	Misty Morn
Dam Traipsing (USA) 1985	Boasting (USA); 1969	Bebopper	Tom Fool
Dam Traipsing (USA) 1985	Boasting (USA); 1969	Bebopper	Bebop
