= Certain (disambiguation) =

To be certain is to have the property of certainty.

Certain may also refer to

- François Certain, French footballer
- Certain (horse), an American Thoroughbred racehorse
- "Certain" (song), by Bill Anderson
