= Danish Women's Volleyball Cup =

Volleyball in Denmark

- Sport: Volleyball
- Founded: 1976
- Administrator: Danish Volleyball Federation
- Country: Denmark
- Continent: Europe
- Most recent champion: Brøndby VK (6th title)
- Most titles: Holte IF (15 titles)
- Website: https://volleyball.dk/

The Danish Women's Volleyball Cup is a Women's Volleyball competition held in Denmark every single year since 1976, women clubs from all around the country division participate in a knock out face home and away system.

== Competition Format ==
The competition is played in a knockout format on an autumn–spring schedule. The winners of the quarter-finals advance to the Final Four, where they compete for the Cup. In the 2025/26 Cup final, Holte IF defeated Team Køge 3–1.

== Winners list ==
Years	Winners	Score	Runners-up
1976	ASV Aarhus		VKV Gladsaxe
1977	ASV Aarhus		VKV Gladsaxe
1978	Helsingør KFUM		Skødstrup SF
1979	Helsingør KFUM		
1980	Helsingør KFUM		
1981	ASV Aarhus		
1982	Helsingør KFUM		VKV Gladsaxe
1983	Helsingør KFUM		
1984	Helsingør KFUM		
1985	Helsingør KFUM		BVC Esbjerg
1986	Helsingør KFUM		Holte IF
1987	Holte IF		Slagelse VK
1988	Holte IF		ASV Aarhus
1989	ASV Aarhus		Holte IF
1990	ASV Aarhus		Holte IF
1991	Fortuna Odense Volley		Holte IF
1992	Holte IF		Fortuna Odense Volley
1993	Holte IF		Fortuna Odense Volley
1994	Holte IF		Fortuna Odense Volley
1995	Fortuna Odense Volley		TV 55
1996	Holte IF		Gentofte Volley
1997	Holte IF		DHV Odense
1998	DHV Odense		Holte IF
1999	Holte IF		DHV Odense
2000	DHV Odense		Holte IF
2001	DHV Odense		HIK Aalborg
2002	Holte IF		DHV Odense
2003	DHV Odense		Holte IF
2004	Lyngby Volley		Aalborg HIK
2005	Fortuna Odense Volley		SK Aarhus
2006	Fortuna Odense Volley		Gentofte Volley
2007	Fortuna Odense Volley		Lyngby Volley
2008	Holte IF		Fortuna Odense Volley
2009	Fortuna Odense Volley	3 - 0 (25-21, 25-19, 25-20)	Holte IF
2010	Fortuna Odense Volley	3 - 2 (15-25, 25-23, 24-26, 25-23, 17-15)	Holte IF
2011	Brøndby VK	3 - 2 (23-25, 25-23, 17-25, 25-21, 15-10)	Holte IF
2012	Holte IF	3 – 0 (28-26, 25-20, 25-16)	Brøndby VK
2013	Holte IF	3 – 0 (25-16, 25-14, 25-20)	Frederiksberg Volley
2014	Brøndby VK	3 – 1 (26-24, 19-25, 25-20, 25-19)	Holte IF
2015	Brøndby VK	3 – 0 (25-17, 25-21, 25-23)	Holte IF
2016	Brøndby VK	3 – 2 (22-25, 27-25, 20-25, 25-19, 15-9)	Holte IF
2017	Holte IF	3 – 0 (25-22, 25-22, 25-20)	Brøndby VK
2018	Brøndby VK	3 – 2 (25-21, 25-20, 13-25, 16-25, 19-17)	Holte IF
2019	Holte IF	3 – 0 (25-19, 25-14, 25-16)	ASV Elite

== Honours by club ==
Rk	Club	Titles	City	Years
1	Holte IF	15	Holte	(1987–1988), (1992–1994), (1996–1997), 1999, 2002, 2008, (2012–2013), 2017, (2019–2021)
2	Helsingør KFUM	8	Helsingør	(1978–1980), (1982–1986)
3	Fortuna Odense Volley	7	Odense	1991, 1995, (2005–2007), (2009–2010)
4	ASV Århus	5	Århus	(1976–1977), 1981, (1989–1990)
	Brøndby VK	6	Brøndby	2011, (2014–2016), 2018, 2022
6	DHV Odense	4	Odense	1998, (2000–2001), 2003
7	Lyngby Volley	1	Lyngby-Taarbæk	2004
