= Play the Red =

American-bred Thoroughbred racehorse

Play The Red
- Sire: Crimson Satan
- Grandsire: Spy Song
- Dam: Double Zero
- Damsire: Never Say Die
- Sex: Stallion
- Foaled: 1973
- Country: United States
- Colour: Chestnut
- Breeder: Elmendorf Farm
- Owner: Elmendorf Farm
- Trainer: John P. Campo
- Record: 37: 4-5-6
- Earnings: US$150,256

Major wins
- American Classic Race placing: Preakness Stakes 2nd (1976)

Play The Red (born 1973) was an American Thoroughbred racehorse who was the son of Champion Crimson Satan and grandson to Spy Song. He was out of a Never Say Die mare named Double Zero. Play The Red is best remembered for placing second in the second jewel of the American Triple Crown, the $200,000 Grade I Preakness Stakes, to Elocutionist.

== Racing career ==
Bred and raced by Max Gluck's Elmendorf Farm, at age two Play The Red won his maiden in his third attempt and also won an allowance race at Aqueduct Racetrack. Then he stepped up in class and finished second in Aqueduct's Grade II Remsen Stakes to Kinsman Hope at a mile and one eighth on dirt.

In his three-year-old season, he finished second in the Grade II Omaha Gold Cup. Next he finished third in the Grade II American Derby at a mile and three sixteenths on the turf at Arlington Park to Bemo. Then Play the Red ran third in the Grade II Gotham Stakes at a mile and one sixteenth to Zen at Aqueduct Racetrack. In May 1976, he finished near the back of the field in the $250,000 Grade I Kentucky Derby. That race was won by champion Bold Forbes with another champion, Honest Pleasure, coming in second.

== Preakness Stakes ==
Two weeks after the Derby, trainer John P. Campo ran Play the Red in the second jewel of the Triple Crown, the Preakness Stakes, run at a mile and three sixteenths on dirt at Pimlico Race Course in Baltimore, Maryland. Play the Red was listed as the longest shot on the board at 26–1 on the morning line in a field of six colts. The prohibitive favorites were Honest Pleasure at 4-5 and Kentucky Derby winner Bold Forbes at 6–5. Play the Red broke last of six and was unhurried under jockey Jean Cruguet. Going into Pimlico's famous "Clubhouse Turn," he tucked in toward the rail and moved up into fifth. The fractions were blistering on the front end, with the first quarter in :223/5 and the half in :45 seconds flat. Down the backstretch, Play the Red drifted out and brushed Honest Pleasure while moving into fourth, a half length behind Cojak. Going into the final turn, Cruguet urged Play the Red to the inside, and he started picking off horses, including Bold Forbes. He finished second, three lengths behind winner Elocutionist. Bold Forbes finished a half length behind Play the Red in third, with Cojak three more lengths back in fourth. The exacta of 4 and 2 paid $347.40. Play the Red took home the 20% runner-up's share of the purse equalling $30,000.

After his performance in the Preakness Stakes, he entered into a stud career and stood at Reeve Ranch in Norman, Oklahoma, beginning in 1982.
