= Adwell (surname) =

Aldwell is an English surname that means 'one who came from Adwell'. It is derived from the Old English Edewelle, which means 'dweller at the stream belonging to Eadda'. The earliest recorded use of the name was as 'Advelle' in the Domesday Book of 1086. People with this surname include:

- Paul T. Adwell, a Thoroughbred horse racing trainer
