= Recitation (horse) =

American-bred Thoroughbred racehorse

- Sire: Elocutionist
- Grandsire: Gallant Romeo
- Dam: Irish Party
- Damsire: Irish Lancer
- Sex: Stallion
- Foaled: 20 February 1978
- Country: United States
- Colour: Bay
- Breeder: Marvin Warner Sr.
- Owner: A. Bodie; Hilary J. Boone
- Trainer: Guy Harwood
- Record: 13: 5-4-1

Major wins
- Coventry Stakes (1980); Grand Critérium (1980); 2000 Guineas Trial Stakes (1981); Poule d'Essai des Poulains (1981)

Awards
- Top-rated two-year-old in France (1980); Timeform rating: 126 (1980), 124 (1981)

Recitation (foaled 20 February 1978) was an American-bred, British-trained Thoroughbred racehorse and sire. He was one of the best European two-year-olds of 1980, when he won the Coventry Stakes by five lengths and the Grand Critérium in France. In the following year he won the Poule d'Essai des Poulains, but was beaten in his last three starts. In all, he recorded five wins and five placings in a career of thirteen races. He was retired to become a breeding stallion in Kentucky, but had little success as a sire of winners.

== Background ==
Recitation was a "big, well-made" bay horse with a white blaze and two white socks bred in Ohio by Marvin Warner Sr. He was from the first crop of foals sired by the 1976 Preakness Stakes winner Elocutionist. Recitation's dam Irish Party won nine races and became a successful broodmare: her other descendants include the Breeders' Cup Classic winner Volponi.

As a yearling, the colt was offered for sale and bought for $35,000. He entered the ownership of Mr A. Bodie and was sent to Europe where he was trained by Guy Harwood at Pulborough in West Sussex. At the time, Harwood was noted for his modern approach to training, introducing Britain to features such as artificial gallops and barn-style stabling.

== Racing career ==
=== 1980: two-year-old season ===
After finishing third over five furlongs on his racecourse debut, Recitation won a maiden race over the same distance at Newbury Racecourse, beating I'll See You by half a length. The colt was then moved up sharply in class for the Group Three Coventry Stakes over six furlongs at Royal Ascot in June in which he was ridden by Greville Starkey and started at odds of 11/1. In a performance which Timeform described as "a revelation", Recitation took the lead a quarter mile from the finish and drew clear of the field to win easily by five lengths from Motavato, Bel Bolide and Another Realm. The form of the race was subsequently boosted when the third and fourth placed horses won the Gimcrack Stakes and the Richmond Stakes respectively. In the July Stakes at Newmarket Racecourse Recitation started 2/5 favourite against two opponents, but was beaten two and a half lengths by Age Quod Agis.

After a break of two months, Recitation returned in the Westhampnett Stakes at Goodwood Racecourse in September. In a race run in thick fog, Recitation led until the final furlong, but was caught and beaten a neck by Clear Verdict. Later in the month he was moved up in distance for the Group Two Royal Lodge Stakes over one mile at Ascot. In a strong field Recitation finished second to the Seaton Delaval Stakes winner Robellino, with the Champagne Stakes winner Gielgud in third and Beldale Flutter in fourth. On 12 October, Recitation was sent to France to contest that country's most prestigious two-year-old race, the Group One Grand Critérium over 1600 metres at Longchamp Racecourse. He started a 14/1 outsider in a field of eleven, with the betting being headed by the Prix des Chênes winner Dunphy and the Critérium de Maisons-Laffitte winner Cresta Rider. Starkey restrained the colt at the back of the field and turned into the straight in ninth placed. Recitation was then switched to the outside and produced a strong late run to dispute the lead 200m from the finish and won by a short-head from the Irish-trained Critique. On his final appearance of the year, Recitation returned to England for the William Hill Futurity at Doncaster Racecourse. Running less than two weeks after his win in Paris, he finished fourth behind Beldale Flutter, Shergar and Sheer Grit.

=== 1981: three-year-old season ===
Recitation began his three-year-old season in the Group Three 2000 Guineas Trial Stakes over seven furlongs at Salisbury Racecourse and won easily by two lengths from Tahoe and Dalby Mustang. With the Harwood stable relying on To-Agori-Mou in the 2000 Guineas, Recitation was sent to contest the French equivalent, the Poule d'Essai des Poulains at Longchamp on 26 April. Cresta Rider started favourite, with Recitation second choice in the betting on 2.4/1. Starkey settled the colt just behind the leaders before moving through on the inside to take the lead on the turn into the straight. He quickly went clear of the field and won easily by two and a half lengths from Redoubtable, with Cresta Rider in third. Recitation returned to France for the Prix du Jockey Club on 7 June at Chantilly Racecourse. He was never in contention and dead-heated for seventh place behind Bikala. The colt was brought back in distance for the Prix d'Ispahan at Longchamp on 4 July but showed no improvement, finishing sixth behind The Wonder. In Autumn he was brought back to seven furlongs for the Harroways Stakes and finished second to the four-year-old Belmont Bay.

== Assessment ==
In 1980, the independent Timeform organisation gave Recitation a rating of 126, eight pounds below the top-rated juvenile Storm Bird. In the official International Classification he was rated six pounds below Storm Bird and was the joint-highest-rated two-year-old to race in France. In the following year he was rated 124 by Timeform, sixteen pounds below Shergar. The International Classification rated him the twelfth-best three-year-old colt in Europe.

== Stud record ==
Recitation was retired from racing to become a breeding stallion at the Ashford Stud in Kentucky, starting at a fee of $40,000 a foal. He was later exported to stand as a stallion in Japan. He was not a success at stud, with his best winner being Country Recital who won the Grade III Chrysanthemum Handicap in 1986.

== Pedigree ==
Pedigree of Recitation (USA), bay stallion, 1978
Sire Elocutionist (USA) 1973	Gallant Romeo (USA); 1961	Gallant Man	Migoli
Sire Elocutionist (USA) 1973	Gallant Romeo (USA); 1961	Gallant Man	Majideh*
Sire Elocutionist (USA) 1973	Gallant Romeo (USA); 1961	Juliets Nurse	Count Fleet*
Sire Elocutionist (USA) 1973	Gallant Romeo (USA); 1961	Juliets Nurse	Nursemaid
Sire Elocutionist (USA) 1973	Strictly Speaking (USA); 1967	Fleet Nasrullah	Nasrullah*
Sire Elocutionist (USA) 1973	Strictly Speaking (USA); 1967	Fleet Nasrullah	Happy Go Fleet*
Sire Elocutionist (USA) 1973	Strictly Speaking (USA); 1967	Believe Me	Alibhai
Sire Elocutionist (USA) 1973	Strictly Speaking (USA); 1967	Believe Me	Up The Hill
Dam Irish Party (USA) 1968	Irish Lancer (USA); 1957	Royal Charger	Nearco*
Dam Irish Party (USA) 1968	Irish Lancer (USA); 1957	Royal Charger	Sun Princess
Dam Irish Party (USA) 1968	Irish Lancer (USA); 1957	Tige O' Myheart	Bull Lea*
Dam Irish Party (USA) 1968	Irish Lancer (USA); 1957	Tige O' Myheart	Unerring
Dam Irish Party (USA) 1968	Party Favor (USA); 1960	Tim Tam	Tom Fool
Dam Irish Party (USA) 1968	Party Favor (USA); 1960	Tim Tam	Two Lea*
Dam Irish Party (USA) 1968	Party Favor (USA); 1960	Beaukis	Mahmoud*
Dam Irish Party (USA) 1968	Party Favor (USA); 1960	Beaukis	Gayee (Family: 16-f)

* Recitation is inbred 4S x 5S to the stallion Count Fleet, meaning that he appears fourth generation and fifth generation (via Happy Go Fleet) on the sire side of his pedigree.

* Recitation is inbred 5S x 4D to the stallion Nearco, meaning that he appears fifth generation (via Nasrullah) on the sire side of his pedigree and fourth generation on the dam side of his pedigree.

* Recitation is inbred 5S x 4D to the stallion Mahmoud, meaning that he appears fifth generation (via Majideh) on the sire side of his pedigree and fourth generation on the dam side of his pedigree.

* Recitation is inbred 4D x 5D to the stallion Bull Lea, meaning that he appears fourth generation and fifth generation (via Two Lea) on the dam side of his pedigree.
