= John L. Lively =

American jockey (born 1943)

John Lively
Personal information
- Born: June 18, 1943 (age 83) Summers, Arkansas
- Occupation: Jockey

Horse racing career
- Sport: Horse racing
- Career wins: 3,468

Major racing wins
- Essex Handicap (1973); Razorback Handicap (1974); Forerunner Stakes (1976); Arkansas Derby (1976, 1981); Southwest Stakes (1978, 1981) Arlington-Washington Futurity (1981); Martha Washington Stakes (1979); Breeders' Futurity Stakes (1980, 1982); Apple Blossom Handicap (1980); Arlington Classic (1981); Rebel Stakes (1981); Washington Park Handicap (1987); Oklahoma Derby (1990) American Classic Race wins: Preakness Stakes (1976)

Racing awards
- Ak-Sar-Ben Champion Jockey (1971-1976, 1979-1980, 1986, 1990); Oaklawn Park (1972, 1973); Remington Park Champion Jockey (1988); George Woolf Memorial Jockey Award (1990)

Honours
- Oklahoma Horse Racing Hall of Fame (2011)

Significant horses
- Bold Ego, Elocutionist
- Updated on July 27, 2008

John L. Lively (born June 18, 1943, in Summers, Arkansas) is a retired American Thoroughbred horse racing jockey who won 3,468 career races, including the 1976 Preakness Stakes, as well as ten riding titles at Ak-Sar-Ben Racetrack in Omaha, Nebraska plus two at Oaklawn Park in Hot Springs, Arkansas and another at Remington Park in Oklahoma City, Oklahoma.

== National prominence ==
Lively began his horse racing career aboard American Quarter Horses at small tracks in his native Oklahoma. He had been riding for eleven years when he began receiving nationwide attention in 1979 for riding Elocutionist to victory in the Arkansas Derby for trainer Paul Adwell and owner Gene Cashman. Lively guided the colt to a third-place finish in the Kentucky Derby then two weeks later he and Elocutionist defeated both the Derby winner Bold Forbes and the 1975 American Champion Two-Year-Old Colt Honest Pleasure to win the second leg of the Triple Crown series, the Preakness Stakes. Swelling in Elocutionist's right front leg kept Lively and his horse out of the third leg of the Triple Crown series, the Belmont Stakes.

In 1981, history would nearly repeat itself for Lively when he won his second Arkansas Derby aboard Bold Ego but came just short of another win in the Preakness when he and Bold Ego finished second behind Pleasant Colony.

== Racing honors ==
In 1990, Lively was voted the prestigious George Woolf Memorial Jockey Award given annually since 1950 to the Thoroughbred horse racing jockey in North America who demonstrates high standards of personal and professional conduct, on and off the racetrack. In 2011, Lively was inducted into the Oklahoma Horse Racing Hall of Fame at Remington Park.

Among his other racing accomplishments, on November 19, 1970, Lively rode five winners on a single racecard at Sportsman's Park Racetrack near Chicago. He retired from race riding after the 1991 meeting at Oaklawn Park to live on his farm near his hometown of Westville, Oklahoma.

== Family ==
Lively's daughter Patrice was married to Hall of Fame jockey, Mike Smith.
