= Devil's Bag =

American-bred Thoroughbred racehorse

- Sire: Halo
- Grandsire: Hail To Reason
- Dam: Ballade
- Damsire: Herbager
- Sex: Stallion
- Foaled: 1981
- Country: United States
- Colour: Bay
- Breeder: E. P. Taylor
- Owner: Hickory Tree Stable
- Trainer: Woody Stephens
- Record: 9: 8-0-0
- Earnings: US$445,860

Major wins
- Cowdin Stakes (1983); Derby Trial Stakes (1983); Laurel Futurity Stakes (1983); Champagne Stakes (1983); Forerunner Stakes (1984)

Awards
- American Champion Two-Year-Old Colt (1983)

Honours
- Devil's Bag Stakes at Laurel Park Racecourse

Devil's Bag (1981–2005) was an American champion Thoroughbred racehorse who was syndicated as a two-year-old for US$36 million, the highest price for any 2-year-old in racing history.

== Background ==
Bred by Canadian E. P. Taylor at his Windfields Farm (Maryland), Devil's Bag was out of the mare Ballade and sired by Halo, making him a full brother to both the Canadian Horse Racing Hall of Fame inductee Glorious Song and Arlington Classic winner, Saint Ballado.

Devil's Bag was purchased as a yearling for $325,000 at the 1982 Keeneland July Selected Yearling Sale by the Hickory Tree Stable of James and Alice Mills.

== Racing career ==
=== 1983: two-year-old season ===
Conditioned for racing by future U.S. Racing Hall of Fame inductee Woody Stephens, Devil's Bag was ridden by Eddie Maple. The colt won all five starts at age two by an average of five and a half lengths and was voted the American Champion Two-Year-Old Colt of 1983. His wins included the seven-furlong Cowdin Stakes in a stakes record time of 1:21.40 at Belmont Park. He set another stakes record at Belmont Park in winning the one-mile Champagne Stakes by six lengths, breaking Seattle Slew's 1976 record time. In his final race as a two-year-old, Devil's Bag won the 1^{1}/16 mile Laurel Futurity Stakes by five and a quarter lengths in a time of 1:42.20 that broke the track record set by Spectacular Bid. Scheduled to run in December's Remsen Stakes at Aqueduct Racetrack, while in training the colt stepped on a stone. Although the injury was very minor, his handlers chose not to race him again that year.

On December 20, 1983, it was announced that a syndicate led by Seth Hancock's Claiborne Farm paid $36 million for Devil's Bag, the highest price for any 2-year-old in racing history, and the third highest for any race horse ever. Hancock said that the colt would be retired to stud at Claiborne Farm after his three-year-old racing season with his 1985 fee set at $1 million for his first stallion year.

=== 1984: three-year-old season ===
Devil's Bag was the winterbook favorite for the U.S. Triple Crown series. Such was his fame that a January 2, 1984, Time magazine article led with: "Devil's Bag, the next Secretariat."

Devil's Bag made his three-year-old debut on February 20, 1984, at Hialeah Park Race Track, scoring a seven-length win. However, on March 7 he suffered the first loss of his career in the 1 1/8 miles (1.8 km) Flamingo Stakes at Hialeah Park. After taking the lead heading for home, Devil's Bag suddenly slowed down and finished fourth. A March 12 article in Sports Illustrated called it "one of the most stunning surprises in recent racing history, for no 3-year-old since Secretariat, in 1973, had stirred the imagination more than Devil's Bag."

On April 19, Devil's Bag returned with a fifteen-length victory in the seven-furlong Forerunner Stakes at Keeneland Race Course and then won his next start on April 28 at Churchill Downs in the one-mile Derby Trial Stakes. He was the pre-race favorite for the May 5 Kentucky Derby. Then, on May 1, trainer Woody Stephens announced that Devil's Bag would not run in the Derby but that he might start in the Preakness Stakes.

On May 7, it was announced that veterinarian Dr. Alex Harthill had discovered a small fracture in Devil's Bag's right front knee and that the colt would be retired from racing.

== Stud career ==
Devil's Bag sired more than forty stakes race winners. His best known runners were:

- Twilight Agenda (b. 1986) – raced for Walter Haefner in Ireland and the United States. Career earnings of US$2,177,843
- Devil His Due (b. 1989) – a multiple Grade I winner with career earnings of $3,920,405
- Taiki Shuttle (b. 1994) – 1998 Japanese Horse of the Year, Japan Racing Association Hall of Fame
- Buy the Sport (b. 2000) – 1st Gazelle H.(G1,9F), International Trial S.(GB-L,8FT), 3rd Beldame S.(G1,9F), 03'BC Distaff 6th

At age twenty-four, Devil's Bag was euthanized on February 3, 2005, after he broke his right hind leg in his stall. He was buried in Claiborne Farm's Marchmont cemetery.

== Pedigree ==
Pedigree of Devil's Bag
Sire Halo	Hail To Reason	Turn-To	Royal Charger
Sire Halo	Hail To Reason	Turn-To	Source Sucree
Sire Halo	Hail To Reason	Nothirdchance	Blue Swords
Sire Halo	Hail To Reason	Nothirdchance	Galla Colors
Sire Halo	Cosmah	Cosmic Bomb	Pharamond
Sire Halo	Cosmah	Cosmic Bomb	Banish Fear
Sire Halo	Cosmah	Almahmoud	Mahmoud
Sire Halo	Cosmah	Almahmoud	Arbitrator
Dam Ballade	Herbager	Vandale	Plassy
Dam Ballade	Herbager	Vandale	Vanille
Dam Ballade	Herbager	Flagette	Escamillo
Dam Ballade	Herbager	Flagette	Fidgette
Dam Ballade	Miss Swapsco	Cohoes	Mahmoud
Dam Ballade	Miss Swapsco	Cohoes	Belle of Troy
Dam Ballade	Miss Swapsco	Soaring	Swaps
Dam Ballade	Miss Swapsco	Soaring	Larking
