= Forerunner Stakes =

- Class: Discontinued Stakes
- Location: Keeneland Race Course; Lexington, Kentucky
- Inaugurated: 1950-2007
- Race type: Thoroughbred - Flat racing
- Website: www.keeneland.com

Race information
- Distance: 1⅛ miles (9 furlongs)
- Surface: Turf
- Track: Turf, left-handed
- Qualification: Three-year-olds
- Weight: Assigned
- Purse: $100,000

The Forerunner Stakes was an American Thoroughbred horse race run annually from 1950 through 2007 at Keeneland Race Course in Lexington, Kentucky. Open to three-year-old horses, it was last contested on turf over a distance of one and one-eighth miles (9 furlongs).

== Historical notes ==
The Forerunner Stakes was contested at a distance of seven furlongs from its inception in 1950 through 1985. From 1986 through 1988 it was raced at 1 1/16 miles and from 1989 through 2007, at 1 1/8 miles. The event was raced as an overnight allowance from 1950 to 1985. It became a Listed race in 1986 before being upgraded to a Grade 3 event in 1988. In 1999, it returned to Listed status.

From 1996 thru its final running in 2007, the Forerunner offered a purse of $100,000. As recently as 2002, it was listed as an official Triple Crown Prep Race.

Your Host, owned by Hollywood film producer and studio executive William Goetz, won the 1950 inaugural Forerunner Purse. Ridden by future Hall of Fame inductee Johnny Longden, Your Host broke the Keeneland track record for seven furlongs on dirt with a time of 1:22 2/5. Retired to stud, Your Host most notably sired the legendary Kelso, a Hall of Fame inductee who won American Horse of the Year honors five straight times from 1960 thru 1964.

In 1959, Tomy Lee also won the race in another track record time of 1:21 3/5 for seven furlongs on dirt. Tomy Lee then won Keeneland's Blue Grass Stakes and the 1959 Kentucky Derby.

== Records ==
Speed record:

- 1:47 1/5 @ 1-1/8 miles (9 furlongs): Rough Opening (1996)
- 1:21 2/5 @ 7 furlongs: John Washington (1977)

Most wins by a jockey:

- 4 - Bill Shoemaker (1959, 1960, 1964, 1982)

Most wins by a trainer:

- 3 - Jimmy Jones (1956, 1957, 1958)
- 3 - Woody Stephens (1963, 1984, 1988)

Most wins by an owner:

- 4 - Cain Hoy Stable (1955, 1963, 1968, 1969)

== Winners ==
Year	Winner	Age	Jockey	Trainer	Owner	Dist. (Miles) (Furlongs)	Time	Gr.
2007	Moudez	3	Cornelio Velasquez	William I. Mott	Zayat Stables	1-1/8 m	1:50.16	L/R
2006	Up an Octave	3	John Velazquez	Todd A. Pletcher	Vinery Stables	1-1/8 m	1:49.78	L/R
2005	Gun Salute	3	Cornelio Velasquez	William I. Mott	Brant Laue	1-1/8 m	1:48.51	L/R
2004	Prince Arch	3	Brice Blanc	Kenneth G. McPeek	Raymond H. Cottrell Sr.	1-1/8 m	1:48.64	L/R
2003	Californian	3	Kent Desormeaux	Kristin Mulhall	The Thoroughbred Corp.	1-1/8 m	1:52.00	L/R
2002	Red Masque	3	Jerry D. Bailey	Danny Hutt	Real Deal Racing	1-1/8 m	1:49.15	L/R
2001	Kalu	3	Corey Nakatani	Christophe Clement	Bonnie Heath Farm & Robert Schaedle III	1-1/8 m	1:48.73	L/R
2000	Gateman	3	Pat Day	W. Elliott Walden	Kennet Valley Thoroughbreds	1-1/8 m	1:48.39	L/R
1999	Marquette	3	Jerry D. Bailey	Richard A. Violette Jr.	Marguerite Cavanaugh	1-1/8 m	1:48.60	L/R
1998	Cryptic Rascal	3	Julie Krone	William Badgett Jr.	C. Landon Knight	1-1/8 m	1:49.60	G3
1997	Thesaurus	3	Craig Perret	Peter M. Vestal	Charles J. Cella	1-1/8 m	1:48.80	G3
1996	Rough Opening	3	Mike E. Smith	David G. Donk	Ryehill Farm (Jim & Eleanor Ryan)	1-1/8 m	1:47.20	G3
1995	Dixie Dynasty	3	Mike E. Smith	J. Bert Sonnier	W. Harley Stepp Jr.	1-1/8 m	1:51.20	G3
1994	Jaggery John	3	Dean W. Kutz	Peter M. Vestal	Thomas M. Carey	1-1/8 m	1:48.50	G3
1993	Explosive Red	3	Mark Larsen	Daniel J. Vella	Frank Stronach	1-1/8 m	1:51.46	G3
1992	Free At Last	3	Jerry D. Bailey	D. Wayne Lukas	Clover Racing Stable (Jeff Siegel & Barry Irwin)	1-1/8 m	1:49.60	G3
1991	Bewray	3	Corey Black	Joseph H. Pierce Jr.	Pin Oak Stable & Pastime Stable (G. Watts Humphrey Jr. et al.)	1-1/8 m	1:51.80	G3
1990	Izvestia	3	Randy Romero	Roger L. Attfield	Kinghaven Farms	1-1/8 m	1:50.20	G3
1989	Luge II	3	Jose A. Santos	Thomas J. Skiffington	Dogwood Stable	1-1/8 m	1:50.20	G3
1988	Posen	3	Don Brumfield	Woody Stephens	Kennelot Stable	1-1/16 m	1:43.00	G3
1987	Blue Finn	3	Dave Penna	James E. Day	Sam-Son Farm	1-1/16 m	1:46.20	L/R
1986	Autobot	3	Earlie Fires	Joseph E. Broussard	Happy Valley Farm (Gary & Steve Wolfson)	1-1/16 m	1:48.60	L/R
1985	Proudest Hour	3	Gerland Gallitano	Joseph M. Bollero	Rogers Red Top Farm (Walter Mullady) & Patrick J. Flavin	7 f	1:24.20	
1984	Devil's Bag	3	Eddie Maple	Woody Stephens	Hickory Tree Stable	7 f	1:23.60	
1983	Derby Double	3	Michael Moran	Darrell Adams	Golden Chance Farm	7 f	1:23.80	
1982	Linkage	3	Bill Shoemaker	Henry S. Clark	Christiana Stables	7 f	1:22.80	
1981	Classic Go Go	3	Anthony S. Black	Jerry C. Meyer	Verne H. Winchell	7 f	1:24.00	
1980	Lord Gallant	3	Don MacBeth	Lou M. Goldfine	Arthur I. Appleton	7 f	1:23.20	
1979	General Custer	3	Don Brumfield	Frank L. Brothers	Ben Erickson, et al.	7 f	1:22.40	
1978	Chabua	3	Daryl Montoya	James P. Conway	Edna T. Thieriot	7 f	1:23.80	
1977	John Washington	3	James McKnight	Thomas H. Stevens Sr.	Betsy S. May	7 f	1:21.40	
1976	Elocutionist	3	John L. Lively	Paul T. Adwell	Eugene C. Cashman	7 f	1:22.80	
1975	Honey Mark	3	Eddie Delahoussaye	Larry Robideaux Jr.	Mr. & Mrs. Robert F. Roberts	7 f	1:23.80	
1974	Aroyoport	3	Earlie Fires	Robert Cramer	August Muckler	7 f	1:23.40	
1973	Royal and Regal	3	Walter Blum	Warren A. Croll Jr.	Aisco Stable	7 f	1:23.80	
1972	Billy Rogell	3	Earl J. Knapp	Larry L. Fontenot	Charles T. & Perne L. Grissom	7 f	1:24.80	
1971	Going Straight	3	Oswaldo Torres	Elwood McCann	Don Ball	7 f	1:23.00	
1970	Supreme Quality	3	Dave Kassen	Loyd Gentry Jr.	Walter Kitchen	7 f	1:23.00	
1969	Ack Ack	3	Manuel Ycaza	Frank A. Bonsal	Cain Hoy Stable	7 f	1:22.80	
1968	Captain's Gig	3	Manuel Ycaza	William W. Stephens	Cain Hoy Stable	7 f	1:22.20	
1967	Racing Room	3	Kenny Knapp	Fred Watkins	Llangollen Farm	7 f	1:22.40	
1966	He Jr.	3	Ronald J. Campbell	Dick Posey	Everett Lowrance	7 f	1:22.40	
1965	Bugler	3	Don Brumfield	James P. Conway	Darby Dan Farm	7 f	1:24.40	
1964	Hill Rise	3	Bill Shoemaker	William B. Finnegan	El Peco Ranch	7 f	1:22.80	
1963	Never Bend	3	Manuel Ycaza	Woody Stephens	Cain Hoy Stable	7 f	1:22.80	
1962	Roman Line	3	James Combest	Vester R. Wright	T. Alie Grissom	7 f	1:21.80	
1961	Four-and-Twenty	3	Henry E. Moreno	Vance Longden	Alberta Ranches Ltd.	7 f	1:23.00	
1960	Tompion	3	Bill Shoemaker	Robert L. Wheeler	C. V. Whitney	7 f	1:21.80	
1959	Tomy Lee	3	Bill Shoemaker	Frank E. Childs	Fred W. & Juliette M. Turner Jr.	7 f	1:21.60	
1958	Tim Tam	3	Bill Hartack	Jimmy Jones	Calumet Farm	7 f	1:22.20	
1957	Iron Liege	3	Dave Erb	Jimmy Jones	Calumet Farm	7 f	1:22.40	
1956	Fabius	3	John Heckmann	Jimmy Jones	Calumet Farm	7 f	1:22.80	
1955	Racing Fool	3	John H. Adams	Loyd Gentry Jr.	Cain Hoy Stable	7 f	1:23.60	
1954	Timely Tip	3	Howard Craig	Reid Armstrong	Dr. A. L. Birch	7 f	1:23.80	
1953	Correspondent	3	Eddie Arcaro	Wally Dunn	Mrs. Gordon Guiberson	7 f	1:23.00	
1952	Cold Command	3	Gerald Porch	Sylvester E. Veitch	C. V. Whitney	7 f	1:24.00	
1951	Ruhe	3	Job Dean Jessop	Robert V. McGarvey	Jean Denemark	7 f	1:24.60	
1950	Your Host	3	Johnny Longden	Harry L. Daniels	William Goetz	7 f	1:22.40	
