= Robert V. McGarvey =

Robert McGarvey
Personal information
- Born: October 2, 1888 Lacon, Illinois; United States
- Died: October 31, 1952 (aged 64) Joliet, Illinois; United States
- Resting place: Elmhurst Cemetery, Joliet, Illinois
- Occupation: Racehorse trainer

Horse racing career
- Sport: Horse racing

Major racing wins
- Ben Ali Handicap (1920); Hawthorne Handicap (1927); Santa Maria Stakes (1934); Arlington Lassie Stakes (1935); Albany Handicap (1935, 1937); Derby Trial Stakes (1935); Remsen Handicap (1935); Spinaway Stakes (1935); Arlington Futurity (1936); Bashford Manor Stakes (1936, 1937, 1951); Hyde Park Stakes (1936, 1948); Kentucky Jockey Club Stakes (1936); New England Futurity (1936); Palos Verdes Handicap (1936); Selima Stakes (1936); Texas Derby (1936); United States Hotel Stakes (1936); Hopeful Stakes (1937); Illinois Derby (1937); Latonia Derby (1937); Princess Pat Stakes (1937); Washington Park Futurity Stakes (1937, 1949); Arkansas Derby (1938, 1951); Matron Stakes (1938); Equipoise Handicap (Churchill Downs) (1948); Great Western Handicap (1948); Scarsdale Handicap (Arlington Park) (1948); Hawthorne Juvenile Handicap (1950); Lafayette Stakes (1950); Blue Grass Stakes (1951); Forerunner Stakes (1951)

Racing awards
- American Champion Thoroughbred Trainer by earnings (1937)

Significant horses
- Case Ace, Forever Yours, Martie Flynn, Reaping Reward, Ruhe, The Fighter

Robert V. McGarvey (October 2, 1888 - October 31, 1952) was an American National Champion trainer of Thoroughbred racehorses whose clients included prominent owners John D. Hertz, Ethel V. Mars, Stuyvesant Peabody, Henrietta Bingham and Emil and Jean Denemark.

In 1935 Robert McGarvey trained Forever Yours to earn American Champion Two-Year-Old Filly honors. In 1937, McGarvey was the U.S. Champion Thoroughbred Trainer by earnings.

Between 1928 and 1951, Robert McGarvey had eight starters in the Kentucky Derby. His best results were three third-place finishes with Whiskolo (1935), Reaping Reward (1937) and Ruhe in 1951.

Robert McGarvey died at age 64 on October 31, 1952, at St. Joseph Hospital in Joliet, Illinois, after suffering a heart attack.
