= Arkansas Derby top three finishers =

This is a listing of the horses that finished in either first, second, or third place and the number of starters in the Arkansas Derby, an American Grade I race for three-year-olds at 1-1/8 miles on dirt held at Oaklawn Park in Hot Springs, Arkansas.

Year	Winner	Second	Third	Starters
2025	Sandman	Publisher	Coal Battle	9
2024	Muth	Just Steel	Mystik Dan	10
2023	Angel Of Empire	King Russell	Reincarnate	10
2022	Cyberknife	Barber Road	Secret Oath	9
2021	Super Stock	Caddo River	Concert Tour	6
2020 (Div 2)	Nadal	King Guillermo	Finnick The Fierce	9
2020 (Div 1)	Charlatan	Basin	Gouverneur Morris	9
2019	Omaha Beach	Improbable	Country House	11
2018	Magnum Moon	Quip	Solomini	9
2017	Classic Empire	Conquest Mo Money	Lookin At Lee	12
2016	Creator	Suddenbreakingnews	Whitmore	12
2015	American Pharoah	Far Right	Mr. Z	8
2014	Danza	Ride on Curlin	Bayern	8
2013	Overanalyze	Frac Daddy	Carve	10
2012	Bodemeister	Secret Circle	Sabrecat	11
2011	Archarcharch	Nehro	Dance City	12
2010	Line of David	Super Saver	Dublin	9
2009	Papa Clem	Old Fashioned	Summer Bird	10
2008	Gayego	Z Fortune	Tres Borrachos	13
2007	Curlin	Storm in May	Deadly Dealer	9
2006	Lawyer Ron	Steppenwolfer	Private Vow	13
2005	Afleet Alex	Flower Alley	Andromedia's Hero	10
2004	Smarty Jones	Borrego	Pro Prado	11
2003	Sir Cherokee	Eugene's Third Son	Christine's Outlaw	12
2002	Private Emblem	Wild Horses	Winward Passage	11
2001	Balto Star	Jamaican Rum	Son of Rocket	11
2000	Graeme Hall	Snuck In	Impeachment	14
1999	Certain	Torrid Sand	Ecton Park	7
1998	Victory Gallop	Hanuman Highway	Favorite Trick	9
1997	Crypto Star	Phantom on Tour	Pacificbounty	11
1996	Zarb's Magic	Grindstone	Halo Sunshine	12
1995	Dazzling Falls	Flitch	On Target	8
1994	Concern	Blumin Affair	Silver Goblin	9
1993	Rockamundo	Kissin Kris	Foxtrail	10
1992	Pine Bluff	Lil E. Tee	Desert Force	6
1991	Olympio	Corporate Report	Richman	11
1990	Silver Ending	Real Cash	Power Lunch	13
1989	Dansil	Clevor Trevor	Advocate Training	11
1988	Proper Reality	Primal	Sea Trek	8
1987	Demons Begone	Lookinforthebigone	You're No Bargain	6
1986	Rampage	Wheatly Hall	Family Style	14
1985	Tank's Prospect	Encolure	Irish Fighter	9
1984	Althea	Pine Circle	Gate Dancer	11
1983	Sunny's Halo	Caveat	Exile King	14
1982	Hostage	El Baba	Bold Style	10
1981	Bold Ego	Top Avenger	Woodchopper	9
1980	Temperence Hill	Bold n' Rulling	Sun Catcher	10
1979	Golden Act	Smarten	Strike the Main	10
1978	Esops Foibles	Chief of Dixieland	Special Honor	13
1977	Clev Er Tell	Kodiak	Best Person	12
1976	Elocutionist	New Collection	Klen Klitso	12
1975	Promised City	Bold Chapeau	My Friend Gus	14
1974	J.R.'s Pet	Silver Florin	Nick's Folly	17
1973	Impecunious	Vodika	Warbucks	10
