= Paul T. Adwell =

American horse trainer

Paul Adwell
Personal information
- Born: June 5, 1915 United States
- Died: October 22, 2001 (aged 86)
- Occupation: Trainer

Horse racing career
- Sport: Horse racing
- Career wins: 404

Major racing wins
- Hawthorne Juvenile Stakes (1975); Pucker Up Stakes (1975); Forerunner Stakes (1976); Essex Handicap (1977); Arkansas Derby (1976); Isaac Murphy Handicap (1978); Lincoln Heritage Handicap (1978, 1983) American Classic Race wins: Preakness Stakes (1976)

Significant horses
- Elocutionist

Paul T. Adwell (June 5, 1915 – October 22, 2001) was an American Thoroughbred horse racing trainer best known for winning the second leg of the U.S. Triple Crown series in 1976.

Between 1964 and 1991, Paul Adwell won 278 races at Arlington Park racetrack in Chicago. During his career, he trained 18 stakes winners. In July 1974, Adwell and stable owner Gene Cashman attended the Fasig-Tipton yearling sales in Lexington, Kentucky. They narrowed their selection to two yearling colts they liked but, unable to decide which one to buy, they flipped a coin and were the successful bidder on Elocutionist. By May 1976, the three-year-old Elocutionist had won the important Arkansas Derby and was Adwell and Cashman's first ever starter in the Kentucky Derby. Jockey John Lively rode their colt to a third-place finish in the Derby behind winner Bold Forbes who had been the yearling Adwell and Cashman did not buy at the auction as a result of the coin flip.

In the Preakness Stakes, Bold Forbes and Derby runner-up, Honest Pleasure set a torrid pace as they battled for the lead. A patient John Lively kept Elocutionist within striking distance then in the stretch passed the tiring leaders to win by three and a half lengths. Scheduled to run in the third leg of the Triple Crown, a week before the race Paul Adwell announced the colt had suffered an injury to his right foreleg and would not run in the Belmont Stakes. Elocutionist never raced again.

Paul Adwell continued training Thoroughbreds until retiring in the early 1990s. He died in 2001 from Alzheimer's disease at the age of eighty-six at a nursing home in Hot Springs, Arkansas.
