= Air Forbes Won =

American thoroughbred racehorse

- Breed: Thoroughbred
- Sire: Bold Forbes
- Grandsire: Irish Castle
- Dam: Bronze Point
- Damsire: Tobin Bronze
- Sex: Stallion
- Foaled: 1979
- Country: United States
- Color: Brown
- Breeder: Howard B. Noonan
- Owner: Edward & Judith Anchel
- Trainer: Frank LaBoccetta
- Record: 7:4-2-0

Major wins
- Gotham Stakes (1982); Wood Memorial Stakes (1982)
- Last updated on June 20, 2020

Air Forbes Won (April 13, 1979 - November 19, 2009) is an American Thoroughbred racehorse and the winner of the 1982 Wood Memorial Stakes.

== Career ==
Air Forbes Won's first race was on March 4, 1982 at the Aqueduct, where he came in 1st. He won his next race on March 20, 1982 which was also at the Aqueduct.

He won his first graded race at the 1982 Gotham Stakes. He then won the 1982 Wood Memorial Stakes, which was the last race of his four race win streak.

He competed in the 1982 Kentucky Derby, coming in 7th place.

On June 20, 1982 Air Forbes Won ran for the last time, suffering a tendon injury while competing in the Ohio Derby and was retired.

Air Forbes Won was euthanized on November 19, 2009 at the age of 30 due to complications from old age.

== Stud career ==
Air Forbes Won's descendants include:

c = colt, f = filly

Foaled	Name	Sex	Major Wins
1985	Siggebo	c	Boiling Springs Stakes
1985	Air Worthy	c	Stephen Foster Handicap
1985	Blew by Em	c	Lawrence Realization Stakes, Pilgrim Stakes
1986	Mercedes Won	c	Sanford Stakes, Hopeful Stakes, Grey Stakes, Florida Derby
1988	Through Flight	c	Arlington-Washington Lassie Stakes
1993	Yanks Music	c	Beldame Stakes, Ruffian Stakes, Alabama Stakes, Mother Goose Stakes
1994	Hawks Landing	c	Bay Shore Stakes
1996	Badge	c	Gotham Stakes

== Pedigree ==
Pedigree of Air Forbes Won (USA), 1979
Sire Bold Forbes (USA) 1973	Irish Castle (USA); 1967	Bold Ruler	Nasrullah
Sire Bold Forbes (USA) 1973	Irish Castle (USA); 1967	Bold Ruler	Miss Disco
Sire Bold Forbes (USA) 1973	Irish Castle (USA); 1967	Castle Forbes	Tulyar
Sire Bold Forbes (USA) 1973	Irish Castle (USA); 1967	Castle Forbes	Longford
Sire Bold Forbes (USA) 1973	Comely Nell (USA); 1962	Commodore M.	Bull Lea
Sire Bold Forbes (USA) 1973	Comely Nell (USA); 1962	Commodore M.	Early Autumn
Sire Bold Forbes (USA) 1973	Comely Nell (USA); 1962	Nellie L	Blenheim
Sire Bold Forbes (USA) 1973	Comely Nell (USA); 1962	Nellie L	Nellie Flag
Dam Bronze Point (USA) 1973	Tobin Bronze (AUS); 1962	Arctic Explorer	Arctic Prince
Dam Bronze Point (USA) 1973	Tobin Bronze (AUS); 1962	Arctic Explorer	Flirting
Dam Bronze Point (USA) 1973	Tobin Bronze (AUS); 1962	Amarco	Masthead
Dam Bronze Point (USA) 1973	Tobin Bronze (AUS); 1962	Amarco	Ronolive
Dam Bronze Point (USA) 1973	Summer Point (USA); 1964	Summer Tan	Heliopolis
Dam Bronze Point (USA) 1973	Summer Point (USA); 1964	Summer Tan	Miss Zibby
Dam Bronze Point (USA) 1973	Summer Point (USA); 1964	Point Count	Counterpoint
Dam Bronze Point (USA) 1973	Summer Point (USA); 1964	Point Count	Queen of Clubs
