= Arkansas Derby =

Grade I flat Thoroughbred horse race

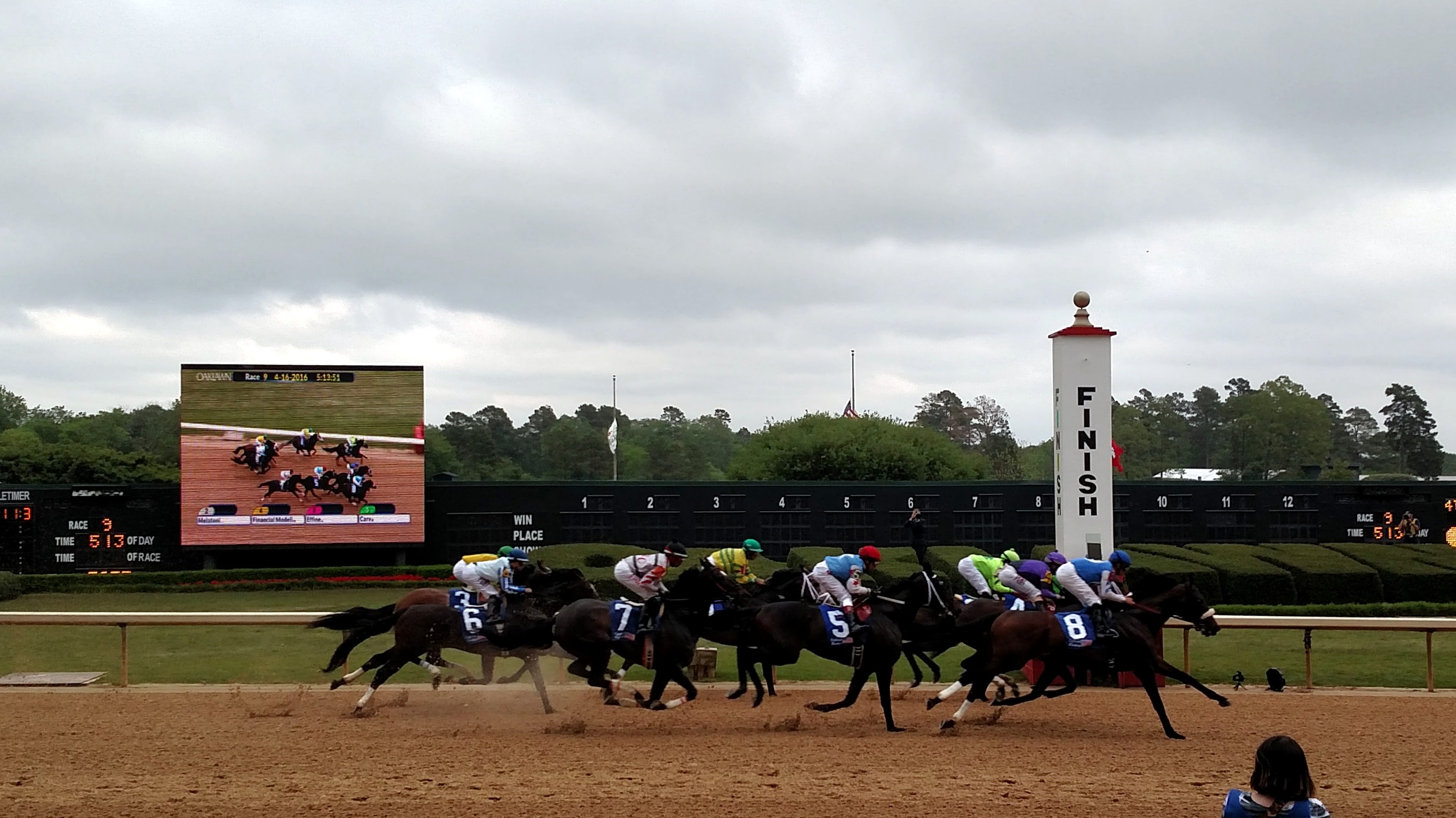
- 2016 Arkansas Derby
- Class: Grade I
- Location: Oaklawn Park Race Track, Hot Springs, Arkansas, U.S.
- Inaugurated: 1936
- Race type: Thoroughbred
- Website: www.oaklawn.com

Race information
- Distance: 1 1/8 miles (9 furlongs)
- Surface: Dirt
- Track: Left-handed
- Qualification: Three-year-olds
- Weight: Colt/Gelding: 126 lbs (57.2 kg); Filly: 121 lbs. (54.9 kg)
- Purse: US$1,250,000 (2022)

The Arkansas Derby is an American flat Thoroughbred horse race for three-year-olds held annually in April at Oaklawn Park in Hot Springs, Arkansas. It is currently a Grade I race run over a distance of 1 1/8 miles (9 furlongs) on dirt.

In 2004, to celebrate its 100th anniversary, Oaklawn Park offered a $5 million bonus to any horse that could sweep its three-year-old graded stakes, the Rebel Stakes and the Arkansas Derby, and then take the Kentucky Derby. Smarty Jones's collected the bonus. The exposure from Smarty Jones subsequent run at the Triple Crown helped increase participation from the top three-year-olds in the country to the point where the American Graded Stakes Committee made the Arkansas Derby a Grade I race in 2010.

Past winners of the race have gone on to win legs of horse racing's Grand Slam. Sunny's Halo won the 1983 Kentucky Derby, as did Smarty Jones in 2004 and American Pharoah in 2015. Elocutionist (1976), Tank's Prospect (1985), Pine Bluff (1992), Smarty Jones (2004), Afleet Alex (2005), Curlin (2007), and American Pharoah (2015) all won the Preakness Stakes. 1980 winner Temperence Hill, 1998's Victory Gallop, 2005's Afleet Alex, and 2015's American Pharoah all went on to capture the Belmont Stakes, as did Creator in 2016. The 1994 winner, Concern, won that year's Breeders' Cup Classic.

The most celebrated Arkansas Derby champion is American Pharoah, who became the 12th Triple Crown winner and the first Triple Crown winner in 37 years. He is the first Arkansas Derby champion to win the Triple Crown. Like Smarty Jones, he too swept the Rebel and Arkansas Derby before winning the Kentucky Derby. The 2021 Arkansas Derby champion is Super Stock.

Prior to American Pharoah's 2015 Triple Crown, Curlin had been the most decorated Arkansas Derby Winner, after winning races that included the 2007 Preakness Stakes, the 2007 Breeders' Cup Classic, and the 2008 Dubai World Cup. For his efforts, Curlin won the Eclipse Award in both 2007 and 2008 for American Horse of the Year, the highest honor given in American thoroughbred horse racing. Curlin was later admitted to thoroughbred racing's National Museum of Racing and Hall of Fame.

The inaugural Arkansas Derby in 1936 offered a total purse of $5,000. The first winner was Holl Image, who was owned and trained by Jack Carter.

The race was run in two divisions in 1960, and again in 2020. The 2020 race was moved to May 2, 2020, because of the COVID-19 pandemic, as the Kentucky Derby had been moved to September. Both races will pay identical points towards Kentucky Derby eligibility.

== Records ==
Speed record:

- 1:46.80 – Althea (1984)

Most wins by a jockey:

- 3 – Pat Day (1986, 1987, 1997)
- 3 – Mike Smith (2008, 2012, 2019)

Most wins by a trainer:

- 5 – Bob Baffert (2012, 2015, 2020 (twice), 2024)
- 5 - Todd Pletcher (2000, 2001, 2013, 2014, 2018)

Most wins by an owner:

- 3 – Loblolly Stable (1980, 1987, 1992)

== Winners of the Arkansas Derby since 1936 ==
Year	Winner	Jockey	Trainer	Owner	Distance	Time	Grade
2026	Renegade	Irad Ortiz Jr.	Todd A. Pletcher	Robert Low, Lawana L. Low & Repole Stable	1 1/8	1:49.70	I
2025	Sandman	Jose Ortiz	Mark E. Casse	D.J. Stables, St. Elias Stables, West Point Thoroughbreds & CJ Stables	1 1/8	1:50.08	I
2024	Muth	Juan J. Hernandez	Bob Baffert	Zedan Racing	1 1/8	1:49.54	I
2023	Angel of Empire	Flavien Prat	Brad H. Cox	Albaugh Family Stables	1 1/8	1:49.68	I
2022	Cyberknife	Florent Geroux	Brad H. Cox	Gold Square LLC	1 1/8	1:50.42	I
2021	Super Stock	Ricardo Santana Jr.	Steven M. Asmussen	Erv Woolsey & Keith Asmussen	1 1/8	1:50.92	I
2020 (Div. 2)	Nadal	Joel Rosario	Bob Baffert	Bolton, Hoyeau, Lipman, Mathiesen	1 1/8	1:48.34	I
2020 (Div. 1)	Charlatan^{1}	Martin Garcia	Bob Baffert	SF Racing, Starlight Racing, Madaket Stables, Stonestreet Stables, Fredrick Hertrich III, John Fielding, Golconda Stables	1 1/8	1:48.49	I
2019	Omaha Beach	Mike E. Smith	Richard E. Mandella	Fox Hill Farms	1 1/8	1:49.91	I
2018	Magnum Moon	Luis Saez	Todd A. Pletcher	Robert Low & Lawana Low	1 1/8	1:49.86	I
2017	Classic Empire	Julien Leparoux	Mark E. Casse	John C. Oxley	1 1/8	1:48.93	I
2016	Creator	Ricardo Santana Jr.	Steven M. Asmussen	WinStar Farm	1 1/8	1:50.14	I
2015	American Pharoah	Victor Espinoza	Bob Baffert	Zayat Stables	1 1/8	1:48.52	I
2014	Danza	Joe Bravo	Todd A. Pletcher	Eclipse Thoroughbred Partners	1 1/8	1:49.68	I
2013	Overanalyze	Rafael Bejarano	Todd A. Pletcher	Repole Stable	1 1/8	1:51.94	I
2012	Bodemeister	Mike E. Smith	Bob Baffert	Zayat Stables	1 1/8	1:48.71	I
2011	Archarcharch	Jon Court	William H. Fires	Robert Yagos & Loval Yagos	1 1/8	1:49.34	I
2010	Line of David	Jon Court	John W. Sadler	Ike Trash & Dawn Thrash	1 1/8	1:49.37	I
2009	Papa Clem	Rafael Bejarano	Gary Stute	Bo Hirsch	1 1/8	1:49.00	II
2008	Gayego	Mike E. Smith	Paulo Lobo	Cubanacan Stables	1 1/8	1:49.63	II
2007	Curlin	Robby Albarado	Steven M. Asmussen	Midnight Cry Stables & Stonestreet Stables	1 1/8	1:50.00	II
2006	Lawyer Ron	John McKee	Robert E. Holthus	James T. Hines Jr.	1 1/8	1:51.38	II
2005	Afleet Alex	Jeremy Rose	Tim Ritchey	Cash Is King Stable	1 1/8	1:48.80	II
2004	Smarty Jones	Stewart Elliott	John Servis	Roy & Patricia Chapman	1 1/8	1:49.41	II
2003	Sir Cherokee	Terry J. Thompson	Michael Tomlinson	Domino Stud	1 1/8	1:48.39	II
2002	Private Emblem	Donnie Meche	Steven M. Asmussen	James Cassels & Bob Zollars	1 1/8	1:50.20	II
2001	Balto Star	Mark Guidry	Todd A. Pletcher	Anstu Stables	1 1/8	1:49.00	II
2000	Graeme Hall	Robby Albarado	Todd A. Pletcher	Eugene Melnyk & Laura Melnyk	1 1/8	1:49.00	II
1999	Certain^{2}	Kent Desormeaux	Leo Azpurua Jr.	B.& J.Williams	1 1/8	1:49.20	II
1998	Victory Gallop	Alex Solis	W. Elliott Walden	Prestonwood Farm	1 1/8	1:49.80	II
1997	Crypto Star	Pat Day	Wayne Catalano	Darrell & Evelyn Yates	1 1/8	1:49.20	II
1996	Zarb's Magic	Ronald Ardoin	W. Bret Thomas	Foxwood Plantation	1 1/8	1:49.20	II
1995	Dazzling Falls	Garrett Gomez	Chuck Turco	Chateau Ridge Farm	1 1/8	1:50.60	II
1994	Concern	Garrett Gomez	Richard W. Small	Robert E. Meyerhoff	1 1/8	1:48.00	II
1993	Rockamundo	Calvin Borel	Oris J. Glass Jr.	Gary & Mary West	1 1/8	1:48.00	II
1992	Pine Bluff	Jerry D. Bailey	Thomas Bohannan	Loblolly Stable	1 1/8	1:49.40	II
1991	Olympio	Ed Delahoussaye	Ron McAnally	V.H.W. Stables	1 1/8	1:47.60	II
1990	Silver Ending	Gary Stevens	Ron McAnally	Ron McAnally & Angelo Costanzo	1 1/8	1:48.00	II
1989	Dansil	Larry Snyder	Frank L. Brothers	John A. Franks	1 1/8	1:49.20	II
1988	Proper Reality	Jerry D. Bailey	Robert E. Holthus	Mrs. James A. Winn	1 1/8	1:48.40	I
1987	Demons Begone	Pat Day	Philip Hauswald	Loblolly Stable	1 1/8	1:47.60	I
1986	Rampage	Pat Day	Gary A. Thomas	Nancy Reed & John Reed	1 1/8	1:48.20	I
1985	Tank's Prospect	Gary Stevens	D. Wayne Lukas	Eugene V. Klein	1 1/8	1:48.40	I
1984	Althea	Pat Valenzuela	D. Wayne Lukas	Helen C. Alexander, David Aykroyd, & Helen Groves	1 1/8	1:46.80	I
1983	Sunny's Halo	Ed Delahoussaye	David C. Cross Jr.	David J. Foster	1 1/8	1:49.40	I
1982	Hostage	Jeffrey Fell	Willard C. Freeman	Helen Hertz Hexter	1 1/8	1:51.60	I
1981	Bold Ego	John Lively	Jack Van Berg	Double B. Ranch & Dr. Joseph Kidd	1 1/8	1:50.40	I
1980	Temperence Hill	Darrell Haire	Joseph B. Cantey	Loblolly Stable	1 1/8	1:50.60	II
1979	Golden Act	Sandy Hawley	Loren Rettele	W. H. Oldknow & R. W. Phipps	1 1/8	1:50.00	II
1978	Esops Foibles	Chris McCarron	Loren Rettele	Jerry Frankel	1 1/8	1:52.20	II
1977	Clev Er Tell	Ray Broussard	Homer C. Pardue	Joseph R. Straus Sr. & Izzie Proler	1 1/8	1:50.60	II
1976	Elocutionist	John Lively	Paul T. Adwell	Eugene C. Cashman	1 1/8	1:49.20	II
1975	Promised City	David E. Whited	Larry Spraker	Big I. Farm	1 1/8	1:51.80	II
1974	J.R.'s Pet	Darrel McHargue	Harold Tinker	W. Cal Partee	1 1/8	1:50.60	II
1973	Impecunious	Jorge Velásquez	George R. Handy	Mrs. R. L. Feinberg	1 1/8	1:49.60	II
1972	No Le Hace	Phil Rubbicco	Homer C. Pardue	Joseph W. Strauss	1 1/8	1:48.80	
1971	Twist The Axe	Garth Patterson	George T. Poole	Pastorale Stable	1 1/8	1:49.20	
1970	Herbalist	Jimmy Nichols	Roy J. Gillem	Greentree Stable	1 1/8	1:50.20	
1969	Traffic Mark	Phil I. Grimm	Ronnie Warren	M/M Robert F. Roberts	1 1/8	1:50.60	
1968	Nodouble	William McKeever	J. Bert Sonnier	Verna Lea Farm	1 1/8	1:50.00	
1967	Monitor	Jimmy Nichols	Harry Trotsek	Claiborne Farm	1 1/8	1:48.60	
1966	Better Sea	Johnny Sellers	Blaine Heap	Scottdale Farm	1 1/8	1:49.20	
1965	Swift Ruler	Larry Spraker	Gin L. Collins	Earl Allen	1 1/8	1:52.20	
1964	Prince Davelle	Charlie Burr	Douglas M. Davis Jr.	George M. Holtsinger	1 1/8	1:51.40	
1963	Cosmic Tip	Robert Mundorf	E. Mahoney	River Divide Farm	1 1/8	1:50.40	
1962	Areopolis	Robert L. Baird	Harold Tinker	August Muckler	1 1/8	1:49.60	
1961	Light Talk	Robert Nono	Steve Ippolito	Jacnot Stable	1 1/8	1:50.20	
1960	Spring Broker	Eugene Curry	Marion Van Berg	Marion Van Berg	1 1/8	1:54.40	
1960	Persian Gold	Jimmy Combest	Monte D. Parke	Jones-Tuckahoe Farm	1 1/8	1:53.00	
1959	Al Davelle	Ronnie Baldwin	Dan Howell	J.Smith, E.Moulder & J.Oldham	1 1/8	1:48.80	
1958	Count Deblanc	Johnny Sellers	Charles C. Norman	Charles W. & Jacob H. Riedinger	1 1/8	1:53.80	
1957	Kentucky Roman	John Delahoussaye	Norman A. McMaster	Ralph Lowe	1 1/8	1:49.60	
1956	Johns Chic	John L. Rotz	Logan Fischer	Mrs. Elizabeth Muckler	1 1/8	1:51.20	
1955	Trim Destiny	Lois C. Cook	Cecil Locklear	G. Rollie White	1 1/8	1:49.60	
1954	Timely Tip	Howard Craig	Reid Armstrong	A. L. Birch	1 1/8	1:49.80	
1953	Curragh King	John H. Adams	James Wallace	Edward M. Goemans	1 1/8	1:49.60	
1952	Gushing Oil	Alfred Popara	Joe Jansen	Sam E. Wilson Jr	1 1/8	1:49.20	
1951	Ruhe	Job Dean Jessop	Robert McGarvey	Emil Denemark	1 1/8	1:51.00	
1950	Big Ike	Harold Keene	Cecil Locklear	C. Buckley	1 1/8	1:52.00	
1949	Cacomo	Billie Fisk	A. Williams	Endovina & Kontos	1 1/8	1:54.60	
1948	Fertile Lands	Paul Glidewell	Marian Barton	Grissom & Sherman	1 1/8	1:51.00	
1947	Fleetridge	Arthur Craig	Roy J. Gillem	Mrs. K. Maxwell	1 1/8	1:51.40	
1946	Bob Murphy	Wendell Eads	Charles Sanborn	D. Ferguson	1 1/8	1:51.80	
1945	Race Not Ran						
1944	Challenge Me	Anthony Skoronski	Dan Cataldo	Brolite Farm	1 1/8	1:50.20	
1943	Seven Hearts	John H. Adams	W. Graves Sparks	Brown Hotel Stable	1 1/8	1:52.20	
1942	With Regards	Johnny Longden	T. D. Grimes	T. D. Grimes	1 1/8	1:50.00	
1941	He Rolls	Preston Mills	Victor P. Noyes	Victor P. Noyes	1 1/8	1:52.60	
1940	Super Chief	Jack Richard	Dave Womeldorff	Mrs. Emil Denemark	1 1/8	1:52.20	
1939	Ariel Toy	Lee Hardy	Hugh W. Jackson	Hugh W. Jackson	1 1/8	1:52.40	
1938	Tiger	Alfred Robertson	Robert McGarvey	Milky Way Farm Stable	1 1/8	1:50.80	
1937	Eastport	Ray Hightshoe	E. Russell	Mrs. V. Wyse	1 1/8	1:50.80	
1936	Holl Image	Herb Fisher	Jack Carter	Jack Carter	1 1/8	1:53.40	

^{1}Charlatan was originally disqualified from his win due to a medication violation. The disqualification was later overturned on appeal.

^{2} In 1999, Valhol originally finished first but was relegated to last place following a Stewards' Inquiry.

== See also ==
- Arkansas Derby "top three finishers" and starters
- Road to the Kentucky Derby
