= Forever Yours (horse) =

American-bred Thoroughbred racehorse

- Sire: Toro
- Grandsire: The Porter
- Dam: Winsome Way
- Damsire: Tetratema
- Sex: Filly
- Foaled: 1933
- Country: United States
- Colour: Dark Gray
- Owner: Milky Way Farm Stable
- Trainer: Robert V. McGarvey
- Record: 11: 5-2-0
- Earnings: US$34,865

Major wins
- Arlington Lassie Stakes (1935); Spinaway Stakes (1935); Douglas Park Purse (1936)

Awards
- American Champion Two-Year-Old Filly (1935)

Forever Yours (foaled 1933) was an American Thoroughbred racehorse retrospectively named the 1935 American Champion Two-Year-Old Filly. She was owned by Ethel Mars' Milky Way Farm Stable and trained by Robert McGarvey.

Among her wins in her Championship year, Forever Yours won the Arlington Lassie Stakes at Arlington Park in Chicago and the Spinaway Stakes at Saratoga Race Course in Saratoga Springs, New York.
