= What a Pleasure Stakes =

Annual horse race in Miami Gardens, Florida

- Class: Ungraded Stakes
- Location: Miami Gardens, Florida; United States
- Race type: Thoroughbred - Flat racing

Race information
- Distance: 1 1/16 miles (8.5 furlongs)
- Surface: Dirt
- Track: left-handed
- Qualification: Two-year-olds

The What a Pleasure Stakes is an American flat Thoroughbred horse race for two-year-olds held annually at Calder Race Course in Miami Gardens, Florida. It is currently an ungraded stakes race run over a distance of 8.5 furlongs on dirt.

The race has traditionally been held during the Tropical at Calder meet, from late October through early January. This meet normally has some of the strongest stakes programs of Calder's eight-month season. Due to permit disputes with Hialeah Park Race Track, the race was pushed back in 1987 and 1991 into the following year. Both of those races were subsequently run for three-year-olds and were won by Zie World (1988) and Sir Pinder (1992).

The race has served as a springboard for Kentucky Derby winner Unbridled as well as such graded-stakes winners as Suave Prospect, Alydeed, Primal, Creme Fraiche, Certain and Morning Bob.

== Winners since 1991 ==
Year	Winner	Jockey	Trainer	Time	Grade
2007	Check It Twice	Manoel Cruz	Kathleen O'Connell	1:46.19	
2006	Drums of Thunder	Manoel Cruz	William Kaplan	1:48.08	
2005	Saint Augustus	Ramón Domínguez	Todd Pletcher	1:47.94	
2004	Better Than Bonds	Brice Blanc	Robert Reinacher	1:48.90	
2003	Second of June	Cornelio Velásquez	William Cesare	1:45.79	
2002	Trust N Luck	Cornelio Velásquez	Ralph Ziadie	1:44.07	
2001	O'Rocky	Cornelio Velásquez	Edward Plesa Jr.	1:47.08	
2000	Radical Riley	Eduardo Núñez	James Hatchett	1:48.33	III
1999	Tahkodha Hills	Eibar Coa	Ralph Ziadie	1:46.91	III
1998	Certain	Javier Castellano	Leo Azpurua Jr.	1:47.01	III
1997	Sweetsouthernsaint	Abdiel Toribio	Leo Azpurua Jr.	1:47.35	III
1996	Arthur L.	Eibar Coa	Luis Olivares	1:46.17	III
1995	Cat On Tour	Gary Boulanger	Ronald Spatz	1:47.26	III
1994	Suave Prospect	René Douglas	Lee Sherman	1:46.88	III
1993	Gator Back	Marco Castaneda	Thomas Heard Jr.	1:47.06	III
1992	Virgil Cain	Eduardo Núñez	Daniel Hurtak	1:48.31	III

== Earlier winners ==
- 1990 - Gizmo's Fortune
- 1989 - Unbridled
- 1988 - Reaffirming
- 1986 - Schism
- 1986 - Baldski's Star
- 1985 - Master Cho
- 1984 - Creme Fraiche
- 1983 - Morning Bob

The race was run in two divisions in 1986.
