= Falls City Stakes =

- Class: Grade III
- Location: Churchill Downs; Louisville, Kentucky, United States
- Inaugurated: 1875
- Race type: Thoroughbred - Flat racing
- Website: www.churchilldowns.com

Race information
- Distance: 1 1/8 miles (9 furlongs)
- Surface: Dirt
- Track: left-handed
- Qualification: Fillies & Mares, three-years-old and older
- Weight: Base weights with allowances: 4-year-olds and up: 125 lbs. 3-year-olds: 122 lbs.
- Purse: $400,000 (2023)

The Falls City Stakes is a Thoroughbred horse race run annually near the end of November at Churchill Downs in Louisville, Kentucky. A Grade II event, the race is open to fillies and mares, age three and up, willing to race on the dirt for one and one-eighth miles (1+^{1}/_{8} miles is 9 furlongs or 1.81 km). The race was run in two divisions in 1968, 1969, 1971, 1972, 1973, 1982 and 1985.

When the graded stakes race system was implemented in the United States in 1973, the Falls City Handicap was awarded Grade 3 status. Reviewed annually, in 2002 it was upgraded to a Grade 2 level.

== Records ==
- 1:48.85 - Silent Eskimo (1999)

Most wins

- 3 - Indian Maid (1959, 1960, 1961)

Most wins by a jockey

- 7 - Donald Brumfield (1964, 1969, 1971, 1976, 1982, 1986, 1988)

Most wins by a trainer

- 3 - Peter M. Vestal (1990, 1991, 1993)
- 3 - Howard C. Hoffman (1959, 1960, 1961)

Most wins by an owner

- 3 - Mary D. Keim (1959, 1960, 1961)

== Winners ==
Year	Winner	Age	Jockey	Trainer	Owner	Dist. (Miles)	Time
2025	Alpine Princess	4	Irad Ortiz Jr.	Brad H. Cox	Full of Run Racing II LLC and Madaket Stables LLC	1 1/8	1:50.46
2024	Loved	5	Tyler Gaffalione	Brendan P. Walsh	Godolphin LLC	1 1/8	1:50.17
2023	Xigera	3	Julien Leparoux	Philip A. Bauer	Rigney Racing LLC	1 1/8	1:50.75
2022	Played Hard	4	Joel Rosario	Phillip A. Bauer	Rigney Racing	1 1/8	1:49.39
2021	Envoutante	4	Brian Hernandez Jr.	Kenneth G. McPeek	Walking L Thoroughbreds LLC & Three Chimneys Farm	1 1/8	1:51.52
2020	Envoutante	3	Brian Hernandez Jr.	Kenneth G. McPeek	Walking L Thoroughbreds LLC & Three Chimneys Farm	1 1/8	1:49.11
2019	Mylady Curlin	4	Tyler Gaffalione	Brad H. Cox	Sather Family LLC	1 1/8	1:50.11
2018	Prado's Sweet Ride	6	Florent Geroux	Chris M. Block	Darrell & Sadie Brommer	1 1/8	1:50.50
2017	Blue Prize	4	James Graham	Ignacio Correas IV	Merriebelle Stables	1 1/8	1:49.30
2016	Lady Fog Horn	4	Albin Jimenez	Anthony J. Granitz	The Elkstone Group	1 1/8	1:50.85
2015	Ahh Chocolate	3	Brian Hernandez Jr.	Neil J. Howard	Stoneway Farm	1 1/8	1:49.68
2014	Frivolous	4	Jon Court	Victoria H. Oliver	G. Watts Humphrey Jr.	1 1/8	1:51.24
2013	Wine Princess	4	Shaun Bridgmohan	Steve Margolis	Becky Winemiller	1 1/8	1:50.12
2012	Afleeting Lady	5	Joel Rosario	Dale Romans	Alpha Delta Stables & Richard Santulli	1 1/8	1:51.25
2011	Arena Elvira	4	Junior Alvarado	Bill Mott	Carolyn Wilson	1 1/8	1:50.76
2010	Dundalk Dust	3	Shaun Bridgmohan	Chris M. Block	Dundalk 5 LLC	1 1/8	1:53.37
2009	Serenading	5	Julien Leparoux	Josie Carroll	John & Glen Sikura	1 1/8	1:50.66
2008	Miss Isella	3	Calvin Borel	Ian R. Wilkes	Domino Stud	1 1/8	1:50.78
2007	Kettleoneup	4	Calvin Borel	Michael A. Tomlinson	Tom Crouch	1 1/8	1:50.28
2006	Ermine	3	Eddie Castro	Ronny W. Werner	Oxbow Racing LLC	1 1/8	1:49.90
2005	Indian Vale	3	John Velazquez	Todd A. Pletcher	Eugene Melnyk	1 1/8	1:50.25
2004	Halory Leigh	4	Eddie Martin Jr.	Dale L. Romans	Jerry Crawford, Matt Gannon & Charlie Grask	1 1/8	1:51.81
2003	Lead Story	4	Calvin Borel	Carl Nafzger	A. Stevens Miles Jr.	1 1/8	1:51.23
2002	Allamerican Bertie	3	Pat Day	Steve Flint	Bert, Elaine & Richard Klein	1 1/8	1:49.60
2001	Forest Secrets	3	Craig Perret	John & Donna Ward	Debby M. Oxley	1 1/8	1:49.49
2000	Bordelaise	5	Pat Day	William I. Mott	Haras Santa Maria de Araras	1 1/8	1:50.01
1999	Silent Eskimo	4	Calvin Borel	Bobby C. Barnett	John A. Franks	1 1/8	1:48.85
1998	Tomisues Delight	4	Shane Sellers	Neil J. Howard	Stephen C. Hilbert	1 1/8	1:51.00
1997	Feasibility Study	4	Mike E. Smith	William I. Mott	Chari-Mari Stable	1 1/8	1:50.65
1996	Halo America	4	Calvin H. Borel	Bobby C. Barnett	John A. Franks	1 1/8	1:49.08
1995	Mariah's Storm	4	Robert Neal Lester	Don Von Hemel	Thunderhead Farms	1 1/8	1:51.37
1994	Alcovy	3	Scott Edward Miller	William G. Huffman	Riley Mangum	1 1/8	1:51.16
1993	Gray Cashmere	3	Pat Day	Peter M. Vestal	Willmott Stables	1 1/8	1:50.96
1992	Bungalow	4	Pat Day	Harvey L. Vanier	Nancy A. Vanier	1 1/8	1:52.03
1991	Screen Prospect	4	Shane Sellers	Peter M. Vestal	George Wolff	1 1/8	1:51.23
1990	Screen Prospect	3	Pat Day	Peter M. Vestal	George Wolff	1 1/8	1:49.11

== Earlier winners ==
- 1989 - Degenerate Gal
- 1988 - Top Corsage
- 1987 - Royal Cielo
- 1986 - Queen Alexandra
- 1985 - Donut's Pride
- 1985 - Electric Fanny (2nd div.)
- 1984 - Pretty Perfect
- 1983 - Narrate
- 1982 - Mezimica
- 1982 - What Glitter (2nd div.)
- 1981 - Safe Play
- 1980 - Sweet Audrey
- 1979 - Holy Mount
- 1978 - Navajo Princess
- 1977 - Time For Pleasure
- 1976 - Hope of Glory
- 1975 - Flama Ardiente
- 1974 - Susan's Girl
- 1973 - Delta Empress
- 1973 - Fairway Flyer (2nd div.)
- 1972 - Fairway Flyer
- 1972 - Barely Even (2nd div.)
- 1971 - Strider
- 1971 - Magnabid (2nd div.)
- 1970 - Mistong
- 1969 - Dedicated To Sue
- 1969 - Yes Sir (2nd div.)
- 1968 - TV's Princess
- 1968 - Sale Day (2nd div.)
- 1967 - Amerigo Lady
- 1966 - Old Hat
- 1965 - De Cathy
- 1964 - Old Hat
- 1963 - Alecee
- 1962 - Primonetta
- 1961 - Indian Maid
- 1960 - Indian Maid
- 1959 - Indian Maid
- 1958 - Bornastar
- 1957 - Leallah
- 1956 - Doubledogdare
- 1955 - Oil Painting
- 1954 - Gala Fete
- 1953 - Gala Fete
- 1952 - Peu-A-Peu
- 1951 - Dickie Sue
- 1950 - Our Request
- 1949 - Brownian
- 1948 - Jack's Jill
- 1947 - Say Blue
- 1946 - Miss Balladier
- 1945 - Jack's Jill
- 1944 - Traffic Court
- 1943 - Burgoo Maid
- 1942 - Pig Tails
- 1941 - Misty Isle
- 1928-1940 - no race
- 1927 - Rhinock
- 1926 - Rothermel
- 1925 - Deeming
- 1924 - Princess Doreen
- 1923 - Guest of Honor
- 1922 - Chatterton
- 1921 - Bit of White
- 1920 - Woodtrap
- 1919 - King Gorin
- 1918 - Last Coin
- 1917 - Vogue
- 1916 - Kathleen
- 1915 - Prince Hermis
- 1914 - Leochares
- 1913 - Wilhite
- 1912 - Buckhorn
- 1910 - Melisande
- 1893 - 1909 - no race
- 1892 - Wadsworth
- 1885 - 1891 - no race
- 1884 - Chance
- 1883 - Freeland
- 1882 - Washburn
- 1878 - 1881 - no race
- 1877 - Flying Locust
- 1876 - Red Coat
- 1875 - Camargo
