= Migoli =

Irish-bred Thoroughbred racehorse

- Sire: Bois Roussel
- Grandsire: Vatout
- Dam: Mah Iran
- Damsire: Bahram
- Sex: Stallion
- Foaled: May 8, 1944
- Died: July 11, 1963 (aged 19)
- Country: Ireland
- Colour: Gray
- Breeder: H H Aga Khan III
- Owner: H H Aga Khan III
- Trainer: Frank Butters
- Record: 21: 11-?-?
- Earnings: US$98,139 (equivalent)

Major wins
- Dewhurst Stakes (1946); Craven Stakes (1947); King Edward VII Stakes (1947); Eclipse Stakes (1947); Champion Stakes (1947); Rose of York Sweepstakes (1948); White Rose Stakes (1948); Prix de l'Arc de Triomphe (1948)

Migoli (May 8, 1944 – July 11, 1963) was an Irish-bred, British-trained Thoroughbred racehorse bred and raced by the Aga Khan III. Trained in England by Frank Butters, Migoli's win in the 1948 Prix de l'Arc de Triomphe in France was the first for an English-trained horse since 1923 and there would not be another until 1971.

== Background ==
Sired by the 1938 Epsom Derby winner, Bois Roussel, his damsire Bahram was the 1935 British Triple Crown Champion. His dam Mah Iran, was a half-sister of the Derby winner Mahmoud. In addition to Migoli, Mah Iran produced Star of Iran, the dam of Petite Etoile.

== Racing career ==
Racing in England at age two, Migoli won the Dewhurst Stakes. The following year he won four important English races plus earned a second to Pearl Diver in The Derby and a third to winner Sayajirao in the St. Leger Stakes. At age four in 1948, in England Migoli won more of what today are rated as Group races plus he finished second in the Coronation Cup. In the fall Migoli was sent to Longchamp Racecourse in Paris, France to compete in the Prix de l'Arc de Triomphe. He won the race, defeating Marcel Boussac's highly regarded colt, Nirgal.

== Stud career ==
Retired to stud duty, Migoli was the sire of 24 stakes/group winners including:

- Gallant Man (b. 1954) - winner of the American Classic, the Belmont Stakes in record time, and who likely would have won the Kentucky Derby were it not for the famous mistake at the finish by jockey Bill Shoemaker. Gallant Man's other wins included the prestigious Travers Stakes, Hollywood Gold Cup, the Metropolitan Handicap where he beat the great Bold Ruler, and Jockey Club Gold Cup;
- Menara (b. 1954) - won 1957 Premio Villamejor (Spanish St. Leger);
- Yla (b. 1955) - winner of the 1958 Poule d'Essai des Pouliches.

Migoli is also the grandsire of Gallant Bloom, a filly inducted in the U.S. Racing Hall of Fame in 1977.

After the success Gallant Man, Migoli was exported to stand as a stallion in the United States. He died in 1963.

== Sire line tree ==
- Migoli
  - Gallant Man
    - Gallant Romeo
      - Gallant Bob
      - Elocutionist
        - Recitation
        - Prima Voce
        - Demons Begone
