= Indian Maid =

American-bred Thoroughbred racehorse

- Sire: Rinaldo
- Grandsire: Challenger
- Dam: Bold Verse
- Damsire: Bold and Bad
- Sex: Mare
- Foaled: 1956
- Country: United States
- Colour: Bay
- Breeder: Howard C. Hoffman (1959); Philip G. Johnson (1960); Elmer Heubeck Jr. (Feb., 1961); Howard C. Hoffman (late 1961)
- Owner: Mary D. Keim
- Trainer: Howard C. Hoffman
- Record: 66: 24-15-10
- Earnings: US$303,457

Major wins
- Florida Breeders' Futurity (1958); Hawthorne Juvenile Handicap (1958); Land of Lincoln Stakes (1958); Falls City Handicap (1959, 1960, 1961); Yo Tambien Handicap (1959, 1960); Beverly Handicap (1960); Modesty Handicap (1960, 1961); Columbiana Handicap (1961)

Honours
- Indian Maid Handicap at Hawthorne Race Course

Indian Maid (foaled 1956 in Florida) was an American Thoroughbred racehorse who won three consecutive editions of the Falls City Handicap at Churchill Downs.

== Background ==
Indian Maid was a bay mare bred in Florida by Elmer Heubeck Jr. During her racing career she was owned by pioneering female trainer Mary Keim of Evanston, Illinois.

== Racing career ==
As a two-year-old Indian Maid's 1958 wins included the inaugural running of the Florida Breeders' Futurity at Sunshine Park. Then in Chicago she won the Land of Lincoln Stakes and the Hawthorne Juvenile Handicap in which she defeated colts.

At age three, Indian Maid won the first of her three straight Falls City Handicaps and the first of two consecutive Yo Tambien Handicaps at Hawthorne Race Course. In 1960, the four-year-old mare had her best year, winning four important stakes and finishing second to Royal Native in the balloting for American Champion Older Female Horse honors.

Indian Maid returned to race at age five in 1961. In February she won the Columbiana Handicap at Florida's Hialeah Park Race Track. In March she captured her third consecutive Falls City Handicap in Kentucky and won her second straight Modesty Handicap at Chicago's Washington Park Race Track while giving away between nine and twenty pounds to her rivals. Even with those weight disadvantages, the June 3rd issue of the Chicago Daily Tribune still pointed out that Indian Maid "only too often, has frightened away potential challengers in major races."

== Breeding record ==
Retired to broodmare duty, Indian Maid was bred to prominent stallions such as Nashua and Bald Eagle. Of her ten foals, the most successful runner was Mr. Pow Wow, sired by Round Table.
