= Vester R. Wright =

American horse trainer

Personal information
- Born: January 21, 1921 Gallatin, Tennessee
- Died: July 24, 1966 (aged 45)
- Occupation: Trainer

Horse racing career
- Sport: Horse racing
- Career wins: 1872

Major racing wins
- Florida Derby (1953); Louisiana Derby (1956); Churchill Downs Handicap (1958); Grassland Handicap (1958); Michigan Derby (1960); Breeders' Futurity (1961); Black Gold Stakes (1962); Forerunner Stakes (1962); Derby Trial Stakes (1962)

Racing awards
- U.S. Champion Thoroughbred Trainer by wins (1956, 1957, 1959, 1961)

Honours
- Fair Grounds Racing Hall of Fame (1991)

Significant horses
- Roman Line

Vester Richard "Tennessee" Wright (January 21, 1921 - July 24, 1966) was an American Champion Thoroughbred horse racing trainer who led all trainers in the United States in wins four times.

Born in Gallatin, Tennessee, he was widely known as "Tennessee Wright." His major race wins included the 1953 Florida Derby with Money Broker, the 1956 Louisiana Derby with Reaping Right. His best runner was probably Roman Line who won the 1961 Breeders' Futurity then in 1962 the Forerunner and Derby Trial Stakes before finishing second in the Kentucky Derby and third in the Preakness Stakes.

On July 24, 1966, Tennessee Wright's promising career was cut short when he suffered a heart attack and died at age forty-five. In 1991, he was inducted posthumously into the Fair Grounds Racing Hall of Fame.
