= Roman Line (horse) =

American-bred Thoroughbred racehorse

- Sire: Roman
- Grandsire: Sir Gallahad III
- Dam: Lurline B.
- Damsire: Alibhai
- Sex: Stallion
- Foaled: 1959
- Country: United States
- Colour: Dark Bay/Brown
- Breeder: Duntreath Farm
- Owner: T. Allie Grissom
- Trainer: Vester R. Wright
- Earnings: US$ not found

Major wins
- Breeders' Futurity (1961); Forerunner Stakes (1962); Derby Trial Stakes (1962) American Classic Race placing: Kentucky Derby 2nd (1962)

Roman Line (foaled 1959) was an American Thoroughbred racehorse. Trained by Tennessee Wright, the colt won the 1962 Derby Trial Stakes by six lengths at Churchill Downs then in U.S. Triple Crown series finished second by a neck in record time to Decidedly in the Kentucky Derby and third to Greek Money in the Preakness Stakes.

Roman Line's racing career was cut short by a training injury at Monmouth Park Racetrack on June 11, 1962. Retired to stud duty he met with reasonable success as the sire of a number of race/stakes winners.
