= François Certain =

French footballer (born 1977)

Personal information
- Full name: François Certain
- Date of birth: December 16, 1977 (age 48)
- Place of birth: Mont-Saint-Aignan, France
- Height: 1.72 m (5 ft 7 1/2 in)
- Position: Defensive midfielder

Team information
- Current team: Brive

Senior career*
Years	Team	Apps	(Gls)
1996–1998	Chamois Niortais	2	(0)
1998–	ES Ussac	173	(5)
- * Club domestic league appearances and goals

François Certain (born December 16, 1977) is a footballer.

== Career ==
He plays as a midfielder, and in the 1997-98 season played two Ligue 2 matches for Niort.
