= Certain (horse) =

American-bred Thoroughbred racehorse

- Sire: Out of Place
- Grandsire: Cox's Ridge
- Dam: Kristie's World
- Damsire: Beau Genius
- Sex: Stallion
- Foaled: 1996 (age 29–30)
- Country: United States
- Color: Chestnut
- Breeder: Clarkie Leverette
- Owner: Williams, Jo and Bush
- Trainer: Azpurua, Leo Jr
- Record: 22: 5-3-6
- Earnings: US$527,142

Major wins
- What a Pleasure Stakes (1998); Arkansas Derby (1999)

Certain (foaled 1996 in Florida) is an American Thoroughbred racehorse. His sire was Out of Place and his grandsire was Cox's Ridge. Conditioned for racing by two trainers, Leo Azpurua Jr and Terry J. Brennan, Certain had three wins and two second places in five starts at age two. His best winning performance was in the grade three What a Pleasure Stakes. His three-year-old debut was an allowance win over The Groom is Red and Cryptodiplomacy, both owned by basketball coach Rick Pitino. Certain's next race was the Fountain of Youth Stakes where he finished third by one length behind winner Vicar and second Cat Thief. His next race was in the Florida Derby where he finished fourth.

== 1999 Arkansas Derby ==
In 1999, Certain went to Oaklawn Park in Hot Springs, Arkansas to run in the Arkansas Derby, against the Breeders' Cup Juvenile Champion Answer Lively, and Valhol, a 30-1 long shot in the race. Valhol won this race with Certain in second place and Answer Lively in fifth place; however, after the race, Valhol's jockey Billy Patin was accused of using or carrying an electrical stimulating device, after video footage from ESPN showed him dropping something on the ground and grounds keepers found a battery pack on the track. A stewards inquiry was set in motion, and a year later, Certain was declared the winner of the 1999 Arkansas Derby, with the winner's share of the $500,000 prize money given to his owners. Valhol was disqualified from the race.
