= Gallant Man =

British-bred Thoroughbred racehorse

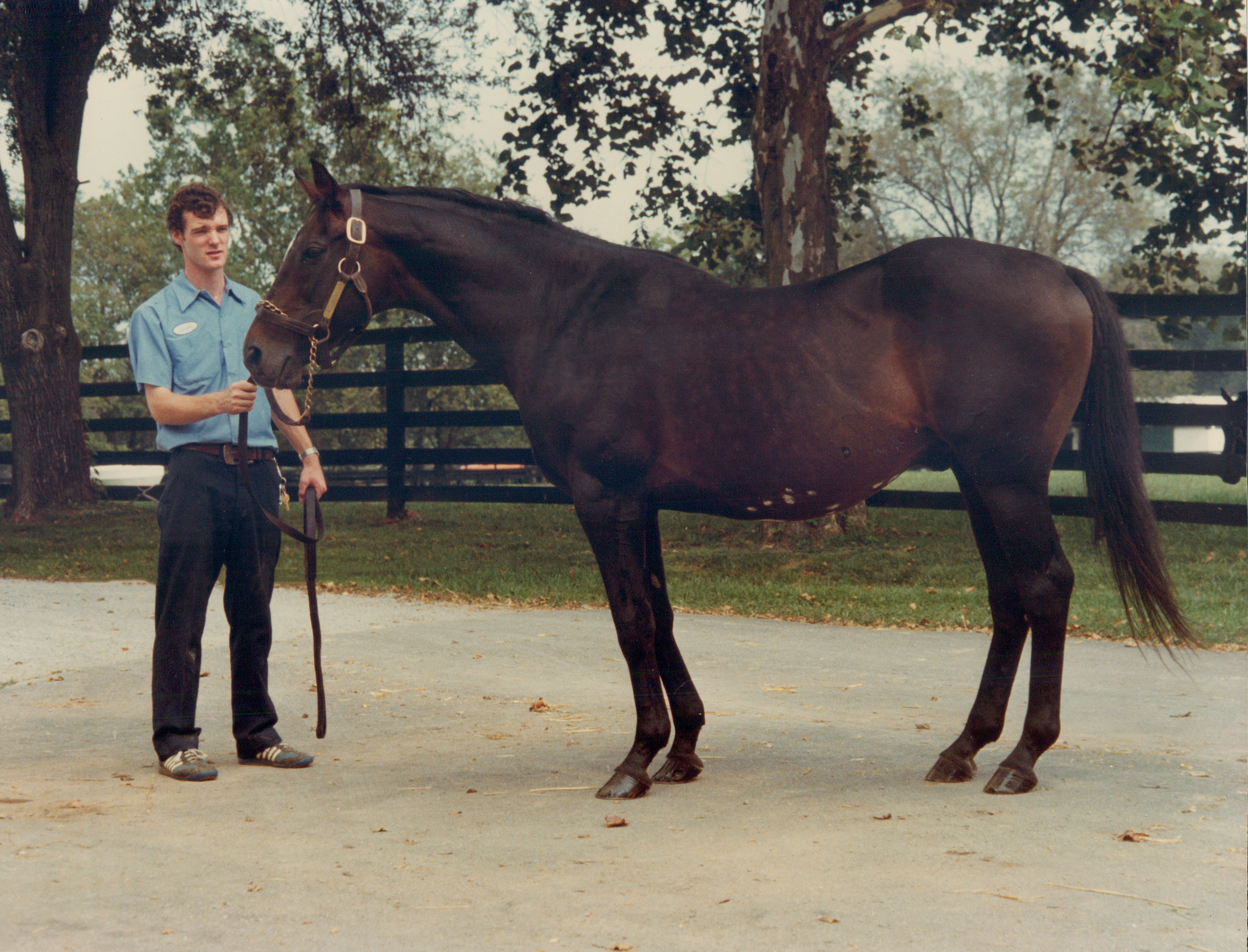
- Gallant Man at Spendthrift Farm in 1981
- Sire: Migoli
- Grandsire: Bois Roussel
- Dam: Majideh
- Damsire: Mahmoud
- Sex: Stallion
- Foaled: March 20, 1954
- Died: September 7, 1988 (aged 34)
- Country: Ireland
- Color: Brown
- Breeder: HH Aga Khan III & Prince Aly Khan
- Owner: Ralph Lowe
- Trainer: John A. Nerud
- Record: 26:14-4-1
- Earnings: $510,355

Major wins
- Jockey Club Gold Cup (1957); Travers Stakes (1957); Peter Pan Stakes (1957); Nassau County Handicap (1957); Hibiscus Stakes (1957); Hollywood Gold Cup (1958); Sunset Handicap (1958); Metropolitan Handicap (1958) U.S. Triple Crown series: Belmont Stakes (1957)

Honors
- United States Racing Hall of Fame (1987) #36 - Top 100 U.S. Racehorses of the 20th Century; Gallant Man Handicap at Hollywood Park Racetrack
- Last updated on November 23, 2006

Gallant Man (March 20, 1954 – September 7, 1988) was a thoroughbred racehorse, named for a horse in a Don Ameche movie. His exact foaling date was unknown or at best debated over the years of his life and many years after. The supporting evidence from a review of foaling stall records in Ireland indicates that he was born on the Saturday after St. Patrick's Day during a highly productive foaling weekend for many thoroughbred mothers on the same farm. His dam, Majideh, is recorded as being in the foaling stall without a live foal until March 20, 1954, at approximately 7:45 am.

== Racing career ==
=== Performance at Kentucky Derby ===
Gallant Man is remembered primarily for his upset loss in the 1957 Kentucky Derby. He would almost certainly have won the race, but his jockey, future Hall of Famer Bill Shoemaker, misjudged the finish line and stood up too early in his stirrups, which slowed Gallant Man's rush for the wire as he briefly lost his stride, and allowed another Hall of Fame jockey, Bill Hartack riding Iron Liege, to take the win by a nose. As noted in books, in articles, and on online sites, Shoemaker's error remains one of the biggest blunders in racing history.

=== Career after the Derby ===
After the Derby, Hall of Fame trainer John Nerud sent Gallant Man out to decimate the field in the Belmont Stakes, winning by 8 lengths at a time of 2:26 3/5, beating the favorite Bold Ruler. The track and race records Gallant Man achieved that day stood until Bold Ruler's son, Secretariat, won the 1973 Belmont Stakes. Subsequently, Gallant Man beat Bold Ruler in the Metropolitan Mile, and his Jockey Club Gold Cup was achieved against older horses.

Gallant Man raced as a three- and four-year-old at the same time as Bold Ruler and Round Table, who both became Horse of the Year.

Gallant Man, who had at one time or another beaten each of them, was never awarded a racing honor or a championship of any kind. He ranks #36 in Blood-Horse magazine List of the Top 100 U.S. Racehorses of the 20th Century. (Round Table ranks #17 and Bold Ruler ranks #19.)

A small brown horse by (Prix de l'Arc de Triomphe winner) Migoli out of Majideh (winner of both the Irish Oaks and the Irish 1,000 Guineas), Gallant Man stood a little over fifteen hands and was afflicted with bad ankles.

If Ralph Lowe had listened to his vet, Gallant Man would not have been bought in the group of nine horses acquired from the Aga Khan ($220,000 for the crop of Irish yearlings). However, Lowe's bloodstock agent, Humphrey Finney, thought the little horse might be perhaps the worst of the lot, but was still a good buy.

== Retirement ==
Retired after his 1958 season with a splint problem in his left foreleg, Gallant Man stood at Kentucky's Spendthrift Farm, where he sired 52 stakes winners. He did even better as a broodmare sire. Genuine Risk (from one of his daughters) and Gallant Bloom were two of his breeding triumphs.

== Death ==
After being pensioned in 1981, Gallant Man was euthanized on September 7, 1988, at the age of 34 after suffering from lameness, respiratory problems, and many failing organs.

== Longevity ==
According to the most up-to-date records on past racehorses, Gallant Man (by virtue of his 1957 Belmont Stakes win), at 34 years and 171 days, is the longest-lived racehorse ever to win any Triple Crown race, surpassing Count Fleet, who lived for 33 years and 254 days, on November 30, 1987. His longevity genes continued throughout the generations. Nearly 20 years to the day of his death, his granddaughter Genuine Risk, who lived 31 1/2 years, died naturally from similar health problems, but also became the longest-lived filly ever to win a Triple Crown race. His grandson Lord Avie became one of the few thoroughbred racehorses to place third or better in all of his races and is the longest-lived horse with this distinction. In 2012, Lord Avie at 34 surpassed his grandfather in longevity by approximately 2 1/2 months.

== Sire line tree ==
- Gallant Man
  - Gallant Romeo
    - Gallant Bob
    - Elocutionist
      - Recitation
      - Prima Voce
      - Demons Begone
        - Danville
        - Flitch

== Pedigree ==
Pedigree of Gallant Man, bay colt, 1954
Sire Migoli	Bois Roussel	Vatout	Prince Chimay
Sire Migoli	Bois Roussel	Vatout	Vasthi
Sire Migoli	Bois Roussel	Plucky Liege	Spearmint
Sire Migoli	Bois Roussel	Plucky Liege	Concertina
Sire Migoli	Mah Iran	Bahram	Blandford*
Sire Migoli	Mah Iran	Bahram	Friar's Daughter
Sire Migoli	Mah Iran	Mah Mahal*	Gainsborough*
Sire Migoli	Mah Iran	Mah Mahal*	Mumtaz Mahal*
Dam Majideh	Mahmoud	Blenheim	Blandford
Dam Majideh	Mahmoud	Blenheim	Malva
Dam Majideh	Mahmoud	Mah Mahal*	Gainsborough*
Dam Majideh	Mahmoud	Mah Mahal*	Mumtaz Mahal*
Dam Majideh	Qurrat-Al-Ain	Buchan	Sunstar
Dam Majideh	Qurrat-Al-Ain	Buchan	Hamoaze
Dam Majideh	Qurrat-Al-Ain	Harpsichord	Louvois
Dam Majideh	Qurrat-Al-Ain	Harpsichord	Golden Harp (family: 5-e)

* Gallant Man is inbred 3S x 3D to the mare Mah Mahal, meaning that she appears third generation on the sire side of his pedigree and third generation on the dam side of his pedigree.

* Gallant Man is inbred 4S x 4D to the stallion Blandford, meaning that he appears fourth generation on the sire side of his pedigree and fourth generation on the dam side of his pedigree.
