= Hawthorne Juvenile Stakes =

- Class: Discontinued stakes
- Location: Hawthorne Race Course, Stickney/Cicero, Illinois; United States
- Inaugurated: 1927
- Race type: Thoroughbred - Flat racing

Race information
- Distance: 1 1/16 miles
- Surface: Dirt
- Track: left-handed
- Qualification: Two-year-olds

The Hawthorne Juvenile Stakes was an American Thoroughbred horse race run annually from 1927 through 1999 at Hawthorne Race Course in Stickney/Cicero, Illinois. The race was open to two-year-old horses and was last contested on dirt at a distance of a mile and a sixteenth (8.5 furlongs).

The inaugural edition took place on August 27, 1927, as the Chicago Juvenile Handicap at a distance of six furlongs on dirt. It was won by John W. Marchbank's filly, May Cooper.

The race in 1999 was supplanted by the Jim Edgar Illinois Futurity, a race open to Illinois-bred two-year-old colts and geldings.

== Racenotes ==
In 1958, the filly Indian Maid defeated her male counterparts to win the Hawthorne Juvenile.

The race has produced three horses that went on to win the second leg of the U.S. Triple Crown series. Head Play accomplished the feat in 1932–33, Bee Bee Bee in 1971–72, and Elocutionist did it in 1975–76. In each case, the horse won only the Preakness Stakes.
