= Mahmoud (horse) =

French-bred Thoroughbred racehorse

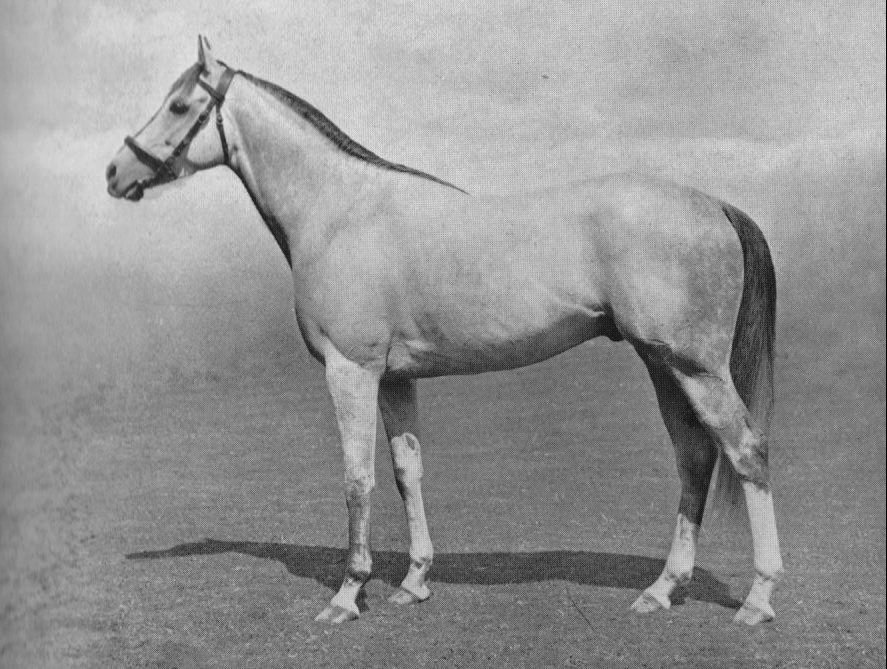
- Mahmoud in a 1937 photograph by Frank Griggs
- Sire: Blenheim
- Grandsire: Blandford
- Dam: Mah Mahal
- Damsire: Gainsborough
- Sex: Stallion
- Foaled: 1933
- Country: France
- Colour: Grey
- Breeder: HH Aga Khan III
- Owner: HH Aga Khan III
- Trainer: Frank Butters
- Record: 11: 4-2-3
- Earnings: £15,026

Major wins
- Champagne Stakes (1935); Richmond Stakes (1935); Epsom Derby (1936)

Awards
- Leading sire in North America (1946); Leading broodmare sire in North America (1957)

Mahmoud (1933–1962) was a French-bred, British-trained Thoroughbred racehorse and sire. In a career which lasted from April 1935 to September 1936 he ran eleven times and won four races. In 1935 he won two of Britain's most important two-year-old races and was officially rated the second-best colt of his generation. In 1936 he won only once from five starts, but this win came in the Derby in which he set a race record which stood for fifty-nine years, and became the third of only four greys to win the race. After being retired from racing he was sold and exported to the United States, where he became a highly successful breeding stallion and was America's Champion sire in 1946.

== Background ==
Mahmoud was a light-coloured grey horse of distinctly Arab appearance standing just under 15.3 hands high bred in France by his owner the Aga Khan. As a yearling he was considered surplus to requirements by his owner and put up for auction at the Deauville sales. When he failed to reach his reserve price the Aga Khan decided to race him and sent him to England to be trained by Frank Butters at the Fitzroy House stable in Newmarket, Suffolk.

Mahmoud's parents were the Derby winner Blenheim and the grey mare Mah Mahal, both of whom raced in the Aga Khan's colours. He was the first foal of Mah Mahal, who made little impact as a racehorse, winning two unimportant contests, but was an influential broodmare, with her descendants including Migoli and Petite Etoile.

== Racing career ==
=== 1935: two-year-old season ===
Mahmoud began his career by running a race at Newmarket in the spring which was declared void after thirteen of the sixteen jockeys failed to notice a false start and completed the full course. In June Mahmoud ran at Royal Ascot and finished third in the New Stakes (a race now known as the Norfolk Stakes) behind Dorothy Paget's unnamed "Bossover colt", who was later named Wyndham. Mahmoud then established himself as one of the best two-year-olds of the season by winning his next three races. He won the Exeter Stakes at Newmarket's July meeting and then moved up in class for the Richmond Stakes over six furlongs at Goodwood later in the month. He won "very stylishly" from Confession Boy and Vanbrugh. In the Champagne Stakes at Doncaster in September he led from the start and won again, defeating the French-bred colt Abjer by three quarters of a length and reversing the Ascot form with the Bossover colt who finished third. At the time the race was regarded as having confirmed Mahmoud's position as the best two-year-old of the year. On his final start of the season, he ran in the Middle Park Stakes at Newmarket in October, one of the most prestigious two-year-old races of the season. He finished third, beaten by two lengths and a head by Abjer and the Bossover colt, but appeared an unlucky loser, having lost a great deal of ground at the start. After this defeat, his status as a potential Derby winner was questioned by some commentators who believed that his pedigree and performances suggested that he would struggle to stay one and a half miles. At least one leading British racing correspondent argued that he would not even stay the one mile distance of the 2000 Guineas.

In the Free Handicap, a ranking of the year's best two-year-olds, he was rated equal second, one pound behind his stable companion Bala Hissar, the winner of the Dewhurst Stakes, who some commentators felt had been overrated.

=== 1936: three-year-old season ===
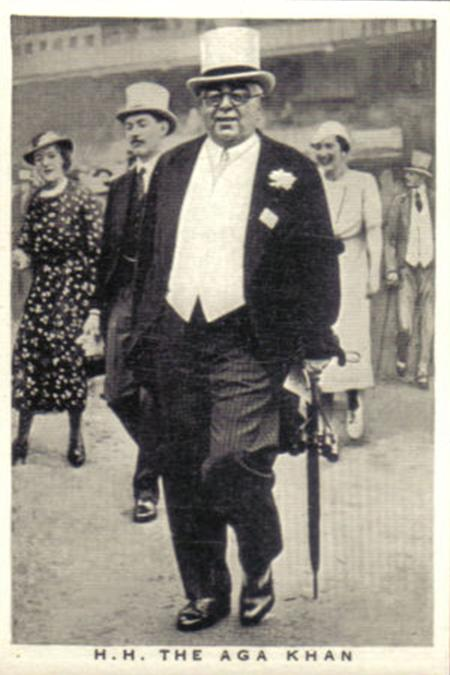
The Aga Khan, pictured in the year of Mahmoud's Derby

Mahmoud began his three-year-old season with a run in the Greenham Stakes at Newbury. He looked unimpressive in the paddock before the race and finished fifth behind his stable companion Noble King, appearing to be unsuited by the soft ground. In the 2000 Guineas at Newmarket on 29 April he was ridden by the fifty-one-year-old veteran Steve Donoghue and started at odds of 100/8 (12.5/1). Mahmoud started poorly and Donoghue settled him behind the leaders with the intention of holding the colt up for a late run, but when the early pacemakers weakened, he found himself unable to obtain a clear run. He was forced to manoeuvre Mahmoud around several horses, losing ground as he did so. Once in the clear, Mahmoud showed good acceleration to take the lead a furlong out but was caught in the closing strides and beaten by a short head in a "thrilling finish" by Pay Up. The non-Thoroughbred outsider Thankerton finished third.

At Epsom Mahmoud started at 100/8 (again) for the Derby in a field of twenty-two runners, with Pay Up being made favourite. Mahmoud, ridden by Charlie Smirke, was seen as the Aga Khan's "third string" with his stable companions Taj Akbar, ridden by the Champion Jockey Gordon Richards, and Bala Hissar being more strongly fancied. Apart from the Aga Khan's three runners, Mahmoud's trainer Frank Butters also had Nonle King, another of the leading contenders in the race. After an unusually dry spring the ground at Epsom was exceptionally firm, and almost bare of turf in some places, conditions which suited Mahmoud, but inconvenienced many of the other runners. The race attracted the customary huge attendance despite the cold and dull conditions. Smirke held Mahmoud up towards the rear of the field in the early stages, moved him steadily forward to fifth place at Tattenham Corner and did not make his challenge until the straight. Mahmoud then made rapid progress on the outside to overtake Thankerton a furlong and a half from the finish and pulled clear to win easily by three lengths from Taj Akbar with Thankerton third. Pay Up struggled on the hard ground and finished unplaced and lame. Mahmoud's winning time of 2:33.8 set a race record which stood until Lammtarra ran 2:32.31 in 1995.

Mahmoud reappeared in the St James's Palace Stakes over one mile at Royal Ascot in which he was beaten five lengths by Rhodes Scholar, a colt who had been withdrawn from the Derby on account of the hard ground. No excuse was offered by Mahmoud's connections for his defeat, although some observers felt that he had not fully recovered from his exertions at Epsom. At Newmarket two weeks later, the Derby form did receive a boost however, when Taj Akbar defeated the American Triple Crown winner Omaha in the Princess of Wales's Stakes. After his run at Ascot Mahmoud had problems with a cracked heel which kept him off the racecourse until the autumn. In September he ran in the third leg of the English Triple Crown, the St Leger Stakes at Doncaster. He looked a likely winner early in the straight but faded in the closing stages of the mile and three quarter race and finished third behind the 20/1 outsider Boswell, beaten three and three-quarter lengths. The favourite Rhodes Scholar failed to settle and finished unplaced. Like most of the Aga Khan's best horses, Mahmoud was retired to stud at the end of his three-year-old season.

== Stud record ==
Mahmoud began his stud career at the Aga Khan's Egerton Stud at Newmarket. In Europe he sired Majideh, the leading three-year-old filly in Ireland in 1942 and dam of U.S. racing Hall of Fame inductee, Gallant Man. Another daughter, Donatella, was the leading two-year-old filly in Italy in 1941.

In 1940, Mahmoud was sold for 20,000 guineas to prominent American horseman Cornelius Vanderbilt Whitney for whom he would become a very influential sire. Mahmoud was sent to stand at Whitney's stud near Lexington, Kentucky where he sired seventy stakes winners, including First Flight, Oil Capitol, The Axe II, Cohoes, and Vulcan's Forge. In 1946, Mahmoud earned Leading sire in North America honors.

Foaled	Named	Sex	Major Wins/Achievements
1944	First Flight	Mare	American Champion Two-Year-Old Filly (1946)
1945	Vulcan's Forge	Stallion	
1947	Oil Capitol	Stallion	American Champion Two-Year-Old Colt (1949)

In 1957, Mahmoud was the leading broodmare sire in North America. He was the damsire of Gallant Man, Determine, Grey Dawn, Career Boy, Silver Spoon and Avatar. His most significant impact on the breed came through his daughter Almahmoud, one of the most important broodmares of the mid-20th century. She is best known as the dam of Natalma, a Canadian Horse Racing Hall of Fame inductee and dam of champion and leading sire Northern Dancer. Almahmoud also produced Cosmah, who produced four stakes winners including leading sire Halo, who in turn sired Sunday Silence.

Mahmoud died at the age of twenty-nine on 18 September 1962. He is buried in the equine cemetery on C. V. Whitney's farm, now part of Gainesway Farm.

== Pedigree ==
Pedigree of Mahmoud
Sire Blenheim	Blandford	Swynford	John O'Gaunt
Sire Blenheim	Blandford	Swynford	Canterbury Pilgrim
Sire Blenheim	Blandford	Blanche	White Eagle
Sire Blenheim	Blandford	Blanche	Black Cherry
Sire Blenheim	Malva	Charles O'Malley	Desmond
Sire Blenheim	Malva	Charles O'Malley	Goody Two-Shoes
Sire Blenheim	Malva	Wild Arum	Robert le Diable
Sire Blenheim	Malva	Wild Arum	Marliacea
Dam Mah Mahal	Gainsborough	Bayardo	Bay Ronald
Dam Mah Mahal	Gainsborough	Bayardo	Galicia
Dam Mah Mahal	Gainsborough	Rosedrop	St Frusquin
Dam Mah Mahal	Gainsborough	Rosedrop	Rosaline
Dam Mah Mahal	Mumtaz Mahal	The Tetrarch	Roi Herode
Dam Mah Mahal	Mumtaz Mahal	The Tetrarch	Vahren
Dam Mah Mahal	Mumtaz Mahal	Lady Josephine	Sundridge
Dam Mah Mahal	Mumtaz Mahal	Lady Josephine	Americus Girl (Family:9-c)
