= Elocutionist (horse) =

American-bred Thoroughbred racehorse

- Sire: Gallant Romeo
- Grandsire: Gallant Man
- Dam: Strictly Speaking
- Damsire: Fleet Nasrullah
- Sex: Stallion
- Foaled: March 4, 1973
- Country: United States
- Colour: Bay
- Breeder: Pin Oak Stud
- Owner: Eugene C. Cashman
- Trainer: Paul T. Adwell
- Record: 12: 9-1-2
- Earnings: US$343,150

Major wins
- Hawthorne Juvenile Stakes (1975); Forerunner Stakes (1976); Arkansas Derby (1976) American Classic Race wins: Preakness Stakes (1976)

Elocutionist (March 4, 1973 – 1995) was an American Thoroughbred racehorse best known for winning the second leg of the U.S. Triple Crown series.

== Background ==
Bred by Josephine Abercrombie and foaled at her Versailles, Kentucky, farm, Elocutionist was sired by multiple stakes winner Gallant Romeo, a son of U.S. Racing Hall of Fame inductee Gallant Man. He was out of the mare Strictly Speaking, whose sire was the very fast Fleet Nasrullah, a multiple stakes winner who broke two track records.

Elocutionist was purchased at the July 1974 Fasig-Tipton yearling sale in Lexington, Kentucky by Gene Cashman, a Chicago native who established a large Thoroughbred racing stable. At the auction, Cashman and his trainer, Paul Adwell, narrowed their selection to two yearling colts they liked. However, unable to decide which one to buy, they flipped a coin, and Elocutionist wound up being the one Cashman bought.

== 1975: two-year-old season ==
A late bloomer, Elocutionist made his first start on October 13, 1975. The two-year-old's racing debut was a winning one, and he won all four of his ensuing starts that year including the 49th running of the Hawthorne Juvenile Stakes at Chicago's Hawthorne Race Course.

== 1976: three-year-old season ==
At age three in 1976, Elocutionist began the year with a third and a second in his first two outings, then won three races in a row including the Forerunner Stakes at Keeneland and the April 3 Arkansas Derby at Oaklawn Park. His performances earned him entry into the first of the Triple Crown races, a first for his owner, his trainer, and for his jockey, John Lively. The colt ran third in the Kentucky Derby behind winner Bold Forbes, who had been the yearling Cashman and Adwell did not buy at the auction as a result of the coin toss. However, Elocutionist came back to win the Preakness Stakes by three and a half lengths, beating runner-up Play The Red and Bold Forbes, who finished third.

Elocutionist was scheduled to run in the third leg of the Triple Crown. However, a week before the race, Paul Adwell announced the colt had suffered an injury to his right foreleg and would not run in the Belmont Stakes. Elocutionist never recovered from his injury and on September 8, owner Cashman announced that the horse was being retired and would be syndicated to stud.

During a career that spanned seven months, Elocutionist finished on the board in all twelve of his starts, winning nine, running second once, and taking third in the remaining two.

== Stud record ==
Retired to stud duty, Elocutionist met with modest success as a sire. The best of his progeny was Demons Begone, who won the 1987 Arkansas Derby for Loblolly Stable. He was the heavy favorite going into the Kentucky Derby but began bleeding profusely during the race and had to be pulled up. Through his daughter Haute Authorite, Elocutionist is the damsire of 1993 American Horse of the Year Kotashaan.

== Sire line tree ==
- Elocutionist
  - Recitation
  - Prima Voce
  - Demons Begone
    - Danville
    - Flitch

== Pedigree ==
Pedigree of Elocutionist
| Sire Gallant Romeo bay 1961 | Gallant Man bay 1954 | Migoli | Bois Roussel |
| Sire Gallant Romeo bay 1961 | Gallant Man bay 1954 | Migoli | Mah Iran |
| Sire Gallant Romeo bay 1961 | Gallant Man bay 1954 | Majideh | Mahmoud |
| Sire Gallant Romeo bay 1961 | Gallant Man bay 1954 | Majideh | Qurrat-Al-Ain |
| Sire Gallant Romeo bay 1961 | Juliet's Nurse brown 1948 | Count Fleet* | Reigh Count |
| Sire Gallant Romeo bay 1961 | Juliet's Nurse brown 1948 | Count Fleet* | Quickly |
| Sire Gallant Romeo bay 1961 | Juliet's Nurse brown 1948 | Nursemaid | Luke McLuke |
| Sire Gallant Romeo bay 1961 | Juliet's Nurse brown 1948 | Nursemaid | Wonderful One |
| Dam Strickly Speaking bay 1967 | Fleet Nasrullah bay 1955 | Nasrullah | Nearco |
| Dam Strickly Speaking bay 1967 | Fleet Nasrullah bay 1955 | Nasrullah | Mumtaz Begum |
| Dam Strickly Speaking bay 1967 | Fleet Nasrullah bay 1955 | Happy Go Fleet | Count Fleet* |
| Dam Strickly Speaking bay 1967 | Fleet Nasrullah bay 1955 | Happy Go Fleet | Draeh |
| Dam Strickly Speaking bay 1967 | Believe Me bay 1954 | Alibhai | Hyperion |
| Dam Strickly Speaking bay 1967 | Believe Me bay 1954 | Alibhai | Teresina |
| Dam Strickly Speaking bay 1967 | Believe Me bay 1954 | Up the Hill | Jacopo |
| Dam Strickly Speaking bay 1967 | Believe Me bay 1954 | Up the Hill | Gentle Tryst |

* Elocutionist is inbred 3S x 4D to the stallion Count Fleet, meaning that he appears third generation on the sire side of his pedigree and fourth generation on the dam side of his pedigree.
