= Honest Pleasure =

American-bred Thoroughbred racehorse

- Sire: What a Pleasure
- Grandsire: Bold Ruler
- Dam: Tularia
- Damsire: Tulyar
- Sex: Stallion
- Foaled: 1973
- Country: United States
- Colour: Dark Bay
- Breeder: Waldemar Farms
- Owner: Bertram R. Firestone
- Trainer: LeRoy Jolley
- Record: 25: 12-6-2
- Earnings: $839,997

Major wins
- Champagne Stakes (1975); Laurel Futurity Stakes (1975); Arlington-Washington Futurity Stakes (1975); Cowdin Stakes (1975); Florida Derby (1976); Flamingo Stakes (1976); Travers Stakes (1976); Blue Grass Stakes (1976); Ben Ali Handicap (1977) American Classic Race placing: Kentucky Derby 2nd (1976)

Awards
- American Champion Two-Year-Old Colt (1975)
- Last updated on October 5, 2007

Honest Pleasure (1973 – August 17, 1992) was an American thoroughbred racehorse.

== Background ==
Bred in Florida by Waldemar Farms, he was sired by leading American sire What A Pleasure, out of the mare Tularia, whose sire, Tulyar, was owned and bred by The Aga Khan IV and was a stakes winner in Ireland and England. He was purchased at the Saratoga yearling sales for $45,000 by Bertram and Diana Firestone in 1974.

He was trained by Hall of Fame trainer LeRoy Jolley,

== Racing career ==
Honest Pleasure was a precocious two-year-old and dominated his division. Headstrong like his grandsire, Bold Ruler, he liked to run in front and easily won the Champagne Stakes, Laurel Futurity Stakes, Arlington-Washington Futurity Stakes, and the Cowdin Stakes. At the end of the year, he was named American Champion Two-Year-Old Colt.

1976 brought a rival in Bold Forbes, another colt with a similar ancestry in grandsire Bold Ruler and running style. Bold Forbes had raced mostly in Puerto Rico as a two-year-old but challenged Honest Pleasure at three.

Honest Pleasure won the Flamingo Stakes by 11 lengths in February, and went on to win the Florida Derby and the Blue Grass Stakes as the favorite.

In the Kentucky Derby Jolley had Honest Pleasure sit off the pace and but he made his move too late and was beaten to the wire by Bold Forbes. In the Preakness, Honest Pleasure and Bold Forbes went to the lead and dueled through 6 furlongs in 1:09, only to lose to Elocutionist, with Honest Pleasure placing a poor fifth. He did not enter the Belmont Stakes, leaving it to Bold Forbes who narrowly won. Honest Pleasure rebounded with victory in the Travers in a stakes record time of 2:00 1/5 for 1 1/4 miles, which was broken by General Assembly in 1979 with a time of 2:00 flat, a record only broken in 2016 by Arrogate.

Later that fall, he challenged older horses in the Marlboro Cup. Carrying 119 pounds and guided by Craig Perret, The race was run on a muddy track and after leading most of the way he was caught at the wire, by the three time Horse of the year gelding Forego, who carried a 137 lb. impost, headed him out of a victory in a photo finish.

At four, Honest Pleasure won the Ben Ali Handicap at Keeneland Race Course.

== Stud record ==
Retired to stud in 1977, Honest Pleasure sired several stakes winners. His progeny includes Judge Angelucci, Tres Paraiso, Honest Princess, Bedside Promise and Leroy S. (named after the Trainer Leroy Stanton Jolley).

Honest Pleasure died on August 17, 1992, at Harris Farms in California.

== Resources ==
- Pedigree & Partial Stats
- Time Heading to a Lonely Derby
