= Castle Forbes (horse) =

American-bred Thoroughbred racehorse

- Sire: Tulyar
- Dam: Longford
- Damsire: Menow
- Sex: Filly
- Foaled: 1961
- Country: United States
- Color: Bay
- Breeder: Wheatley Stable
- Owner: Wheatley Stable
- Trainer: William C. Winfrey
- Record: 36: 8-7-10
- Earnings: US$$359,366

Major wins
- Gardenia Stakes (1963); Sorority Stakes (1963); Acorn Stakes (1964)

Awards
- TRA American Champion Two-Year-Old Filly (1963)

Castle Forbes (foaled 1961) was an American Thoroughbred Champion racemare voted the American Co-Champion Two-Year-Old Filly of 1963. Sired by the Irish stallion Tulyar, winner of the 1952 Epsom Derby, her dam was Longford, a daughter of the very good American runner, Menow.

Bred and raced by the Phipps family's Wheatley Stable, Castle Forbes was trained by National Museum of Racing and Hall of Fame trainer, Bill Winfrey. Among her most important wins at age two, she captured the Sorority Stakes at Monmouth Park and the Gardenia Stakes at Garden State Park in which she defeated the previously unbeaten Tosmah with whom she would share 1963 Championship honors. Castle Forbes was named champion by the Thoroughbred Racing Association, while Tosmah took the rival Daily Racing Form and Turf & Sports Digest awards.

Racing at age three, Castle Forbes won the Acorn Stakes at Belmont Park in New York.
