= Bold Forbes =

American-bred Thoroughbred racehorse

- Bold Forbes
- Sire: Irish Castle
- Grandsire: Bold Ruler
- Dam: Comely Nell
- Damsire: Commodore
- Sex: Stallion
- Foaled: 1973
- Died: 2000
- Country: United States
- Color: Brown
- Breeder: Eaton Farms Inc. & Red Bull Stable
- Owner: E. Rodriguez Tizol; Silks: Red, Black Diamond Frame, Black Sleeves, Black Cap
- Trainer: Laz Barrera
- Record: 18: 13–1–4
- Earnings: $546,536

Major wins
- Clasico Dia de Los Padre (1975); Saratoga Special Stakes (1975); Tremont Stakes (1975); Wood Memorial Stakes (1976); Bay Shore Stakes (1976); San Jacinto Stakes (1976); San Vicente Stakes (1976) U.S. Triple Crown wins: Kentucky Derby (1976); Belmont Stakes (1976)

Awards
- American Champion Three-Year-Old Male Horse (1976)

Bold Forbes (March 31, 1973 – August 9, 2000) was a champion thoroughbred racehorse, winner of the 1976 Kentucky Derby and 1976 Belmont Stakes.

== Background ==
Bold Forbes was a bay horse bred in Kentucky by Lee Eaton. Bold Forbes' dam Comely Nell was a daughter of the Kentucky Oaks winner Nellie L.

== Racing career ==
=== 1975: two-year-old season ===
Bold Forbes was campaigned in Puerto Rico as a two-year-old, where he won seven of eight starts in 1975. He was then transferred to the United States where he won the Saratoga Special Stakes and the Tremont Stakes.

=== 1976: three-year-old season ===
As a three-year-old Bold Forbes was trained by Laz Barrera. He won the San Jacinto Stakes, Wood Memorial Stakes and Bay Shore Stakes.

On the first Saturday in May 1976, Bold Forbes contested the Kentucky Derby. Ridden by Angel Cordero, he led from the start, setting a "blistering pace", and won by half a length from the 2/5 favourite Honest Pleasure. In the Preakness Stakes Bold Forbes again took an early lead and set an exceptionally fast pace, but after a prolonged battle with Honest Pleasure, both horses tired in the final stages and were beaten by Elocutionist, with Bold Forbes finishing third. In the Belmont Stakes, Bold Forbes again led from the start and won by a neck from McKenzie Bridge with Great Contractor a further neck away in third.

At the end of the year, Bold Forbes was voted American Champion Three-Year-Old Male Horse. He lost Horse of the Year honors to six-year-old champion Forego.

== Retirement ==
Bold Forbes' grave at Kentucky Horse Park

Bold Forbes was retired to stud after his three-year-old season with earnings of $546,536. He stood at Stone Farm in Paris, Kentucky. He sired 13 crops through 1990 with 460 named foals and 304 winners, 30 of which were stakes winners, and his offspring have won over $18 million. Some of Bold Forbes' offspring include champions Tiffany Lass (winner of the Kentucky Oaks) and Bold Apparel, as well as Grade I stakes winner Air Forbes Won.

The dark bay/brown champion was moved to the Kentucky Horse Park in April 1991. He was a resident of the Hall of Champions for nine years. Until his death, he was the oldest living Kentucky Derby winner. He died on August 9, 2000, at the age of 27 after being humanely euthanized due to renal failure and complications from gastroenteritis. Bold Forbes is buried at the Hall of Champions, where a memorial is dedicated to him in the "Memorial of Champions."

== Career earnings ==
In 1975, at age two, Bold Forbes started 8 times, winning seven times and finishing third once, for earnings of $86,250. In 1976, as a three-year-old, he made 10 starts, winning six, placing second once, and placing third three times. He won a total of $460,286.

== Pedigree ==
Pedigree of Bold Forbes (USA), bay horse, 1973
| Sire Irish Castle (USA) 1967 | Bold Ruler (USA); 1954 | Nasrullah | Nearco |
| Sire Irish Castle (USA) 1967 | Bold Ruler (USA); 1954 | Nasrullah | Mumtaz Begum |
| Sire Irish Castle (USA) 1967 | Bold Ruler (USA); 1954 | Miss Disco | Discovery |
| Sire Irish Castle (USA) 1967 | Bold Ruler (USA); 1954 | Miss Disco | Outdone |
| Sire Irish Castle (USA) 1967 | Castle Forbes (USA); 1961 | Tulyar | Tehran |
| Sire Irish Castle (USA) 1967 | Castle Forbes (USA); 1961 | Tulyar | Neocracy |
| Sire Irish Castle (USA) 1967 | Castle Forbes (USA); 1961 | Longford | Menow |
| Sire Irish Castle (USA) 1967 | Castle Forbes (USA); 1961 | Longford | Bold Irish |
| Dam Comely Nell (USA) 1962 | Commodore M (USA); 1951 | Bull Lea | Bull Dog |
| Dam Comely Nell (USA) 1962 | Commodore M (USA); 1951 | Bull Lea | Rose Leaves |
| Dam Comely Nell (USA) 1962 | Commodore M (USA); 1951 | Early Autumn | Jamestown |
| Dam Comely Nell (USA) 1962 | Commodore M (USA); 1951 | Early Autumn | Equinoctial |
| Dam Comely Nell (USA) 1962 | Nellie L (USA); 1940 | Blenheim | Blandford |
| Dam Comely Nell (USA) 1962 | Nellie L (USA); 1940 | Blenheim | Malva |
| Dam Comely Nell (USA) 1962 | Nellie L (USA); 1940 | Nellie Flag | American Flag |
| Dam Comely Nell (USA) 1962 | Nellie L (USA); 1940 | Nellie Flag | Nellie Morse (Family: 9-f) |

== See also ==
- List of racehorses
- List of Puerto Ricans-Sports
- Ángel Cordero Jr.
- Kentucky Derby
