= Eugene C. Cashman =

- Born: October 7, 1921; Chicago, Illinois, United States
- Died: April 6, 2000 (aged 78); Cary, North Carolina, United States
- Occupations: Commodities trader Racehorse owner/breeder
- Political party: Republican
- Children: 5

Eugene C. Cashman (October 7, 1921 - April 6, 2000) was an American policeman turned businessman and a Thoroughbred racehorse owner. He was a prominent Chicago commodities trader and was a member of the Chicago Board of Trade for nearly half a century.

== Biography ==
Gene Cashman and three of his brothers were police officers with the Chicago Police Department when he and brother George decided to quit their jobs and go into business for themselves. Cashman made a fortune trading in the volatile grain markets of the 1970s. Gene Cashman's wealth allowed him to invest in his passion for horse racing and in 1976 his colt Elocutionist won the Preakness Stakes, the second leg of the U.S. Triple Crown series. In 1981, Cashman purchased the 217-acre (0.88 km^{2}) Pebble Hill Farm in Florida from Mitchell Wolfson and renamed it September Farm. In 1985 he sold his racing operations and held a dispersal of his horses at Keeneland Sales.

Gene Cashman died at age seventy-eight in North Carolina following a lengthy illness.
