= Ferry (horse) =

British-bred Thoroughbred racehorse

- Sire: Swynford
- Grandsire: John O'Gaunt
- Dam: Gondolette
- Damsire: Loved One
- Sex: Mare
- Foaled: 1915
- Country: United Kingdom
- Colour: Bay
- Breeder: 17th Earl of Derby
- Owner: 17th Earl of Derby
- Trainer: George Lambton
- Record: 4: 1-1-0

Major wins
- 1000 Guineas (1918)

Ferry (1915 – after 1930) was a British Thoroughbred racehorse and broodmare. As a three-year-old in 1918 she recorded a major upset when winning the 1000 Guineas at odds of 50/1. She was later awarded second place in the Oaks Stakes but failed when matched against male opposition. She made little impact as a broodmare and ended her days in Poland.

== Background ==
Ferry was a bay mare bred and owned by Edward Stanley, 17th Earl of Derby. She was trained throughout his career by Lord Derby’s private trainer George Lambton at the Stanley House stable at Newmarket, Suffolk.

Ferry's sire Swynford was an outstanding racehorse who won the St Leger in 1910 and the Eclipse Stakes in the following year. He was even better as a breeding stallion with his other offspring including Blandford, Saucy Sue, Challenger and Tranquil. Ferry’s dam Gondolette has been described as “one of the most famous mares in the Stud Book”. She was the dam of Ferry’s full brother Sansovino (Epsom Derby) and the direct, female-line ancestor of such notable thoroughbreds as Hyperion, Sickle, Pharamond, Big Game and Snow Knight.

Ferry's racing career took place during World War I. Many racecourses were closed for the duration of the conflict and all five of the traditional British Classic Races were run at Newmarket.

== Racing career ==
=== 1918: three-year-old season ===
On 1 May the 106th running of the 1000 Guineas over one mile at Newmarket Racecourse attracted an unusually small field of eight runners. The Middle Park Stakes winner Benevente started favourite ahead of My Dear whereas Ferry, ridden by Brownie Carslake, started a 50/1 outsider. Benevente led before giving way to My Dear but Ferry took the lead in the closing stages and won "easily" by two lengths.

The filly was stepped up in distance for the ten furlong Newmarket Stakes later that month but ran unplaced behind the colt Somme Kiss. Ferry was then moved up again in the distance for the New Oaks Stakes, run over one and a half miles at Newmarket on 6 June. She came home in a dead-heat for third with Silver Bullet behind Stony Ford and My Dear, but was promoted to joint-second after Stony Ford was disqualified for causing interference.

Newmarket saw the running of the September Stakes in September, a wartime substitute for the St Leger. Ferry started a 25/1 outsider and came home last of the five runners behind Gainsborough.

== Assessment and honours ==
In their book, A Century of Champions, based on the Timeform rating system, John Randall and Tony Morris rated Roseway an "inferior" winner of the 1000 Guineas.

== Breeding record ==
Ferry was retired from racing to become a broodmare for Lord Derby's stud. She was later bought by Lord Beaverbrook and then sold for export to Poland in 1930. She produced at least three named foals:

- Mayflower, a bay filly, foaled in 1922, sired by Gay Crusader. Had some influence as a broodmare in Argentina.
- Obol, brown filly, 1924, by Phalaris
- Buctouche, bay filly, 1926, by Friar Marcus

== Pedigree ==
Pedigree of Ferry (GB), bay mare, 1915
Sire Swynford (GB) 1907	John O'Gaunt; 1901	Isinglass	Isonomy
Sire Swynford (GB) 1907	John O'Gaunt; 1901	Isinglass	Dead Lock
Sire Swynford (GB) 1907	John O'Gaunt; 1901	La Fleche	St. Simon
Sire Swynford (GB) 1907	John O'Gaunt; 1901	La Fleche	Quiver
Sire Swynford (GB) 1907	Canterbury Pilgrim; 1893	Tristan	Hermit
Sire Swynford (GB) 1907	Canterbury Pilgrim; 1893	Tristan	Thrift
Sire Swynford (GB) 1907	Canterbury Pilgrim; 1893	Pilgrimage	The Palmer
Sire Swynford (GB) 1907	Canterbury Pilgrim; 1893	Pilgrimage	Lady Audley
Dam Gondolette (GB) 1902	Loved One; 1883	See Saw	Buccaneer
Dam Gondolette (GB) 1902	Loved One; 1883	See Saw	Margery Daw
Dam Gondolette (GB) 1902	Loved One; 1883	Pilgrimage	The Palmer
Dam Gondolette (GB) 1902	Loved One; 1883	Pilgrimage	Lady Audley
Dam Gondolette (GB) 1902	Dongola; 1883	Doncaster	Stockwell
Dam Gondolette (GB) 1902	Dongola; 1883	Doncaster	Marigold
Dam Gondolette (GB) 1902	Dongola; 1883	Douranee	Rosicrucian
Dam Gondolette (GB) 1902	Dongola; 1883	Douranee	Fenella (Family 6-e)

- Ferry is inbred 3 x 3 to Pilgrimage. This means that Ferry is inbred 4 x 4 to both The Palmer and Lady Audley.
