= Tranquil (horse) =

British-bred Thoroughbred racehorse

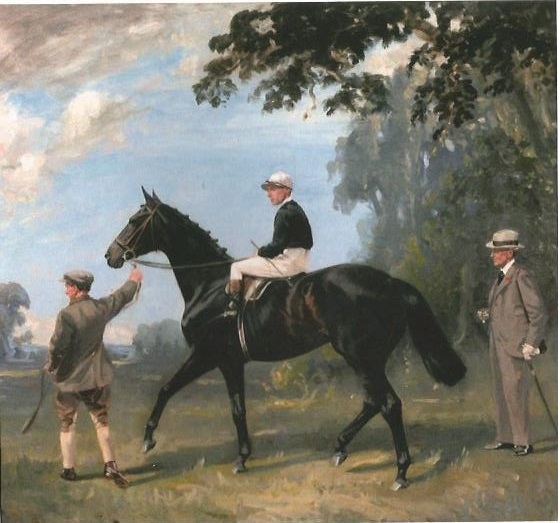
- Tranquil with trainer, George Lambton and jockey Tommy Weston by Lynwood Palmer. (1923)
- Sire: Swynford
- Grandsire: John O' Gaunt
- Dam: Serenissima
- Damsire: Minoru
- Sex: Mare
- Foaled: 1920
- Country: United Kingdom
- Colour: Bay
- Breeder: Edward Stanley, 17th Earl of Derby
- Owner: Lord Derby
- Trainer: George Lambton
- Record: 15: 8–1–1
- Earnings: £20,707 (1923)

Major wins
- 1000 Guineas (1923); St Leger (1923); Newmarket Oaks (1923); Jockey Club Cup (1923)

Awards
- Biggest prize-money winner in Britain (1923)

Tranquil (1920 – October 1938) was a British Thoroughbred racehorse and broodmare. She showed considerable promise as a two-year-old when she won one race and finished second in the Gimcrack Stakes. In the following season she was one of the best horses in Britain, scoring classic victories in the 1000 Guineas and St Leger Stakes as well as winning four other races including the Jockey Club Cup and Newmarket Oaks. She won once in 1924 before her racing career was ended by injury. She made no impact as a broodmare.

== Background ==
Tranquil was a "big, raking" bay mare bred in England by her owner Edward Stanley, 17th Earl of Derby. During her racing career she was trained by George Lambton at the Stanley House stable near Newmarket, Suffolk.

Her sire Swynford was an outstanding racehorse who won the St Leger in 1910 and the Eclipse Stakes in the following year. He was even better as a breeding stallion with his other offspring including Blandford, Saucy Sue, Challenger and Sansovino. Tranquil's dam Serenissima was an exceptional broodmare whose other descendants included Sickle, Hyperion, and Pharamond.

== Racing career ==
=== 1922: two-year-old season ===
In the Gimcrack Stakes at York Racecourse Tranquil finished second, beaten four lengths by Town Guard, who was regarded as the season's best juvenile colt. In October at Newmarket Racecourse she recorded her only victory of the season when she defeated two opponents to win the Bretby Stakes. She also finished fourth behind My Lord, Americus Boy and the Aga Khan Teresina in the Linton Stakes and was unplaced in her other race.

=== 1923: three-year-old season ===
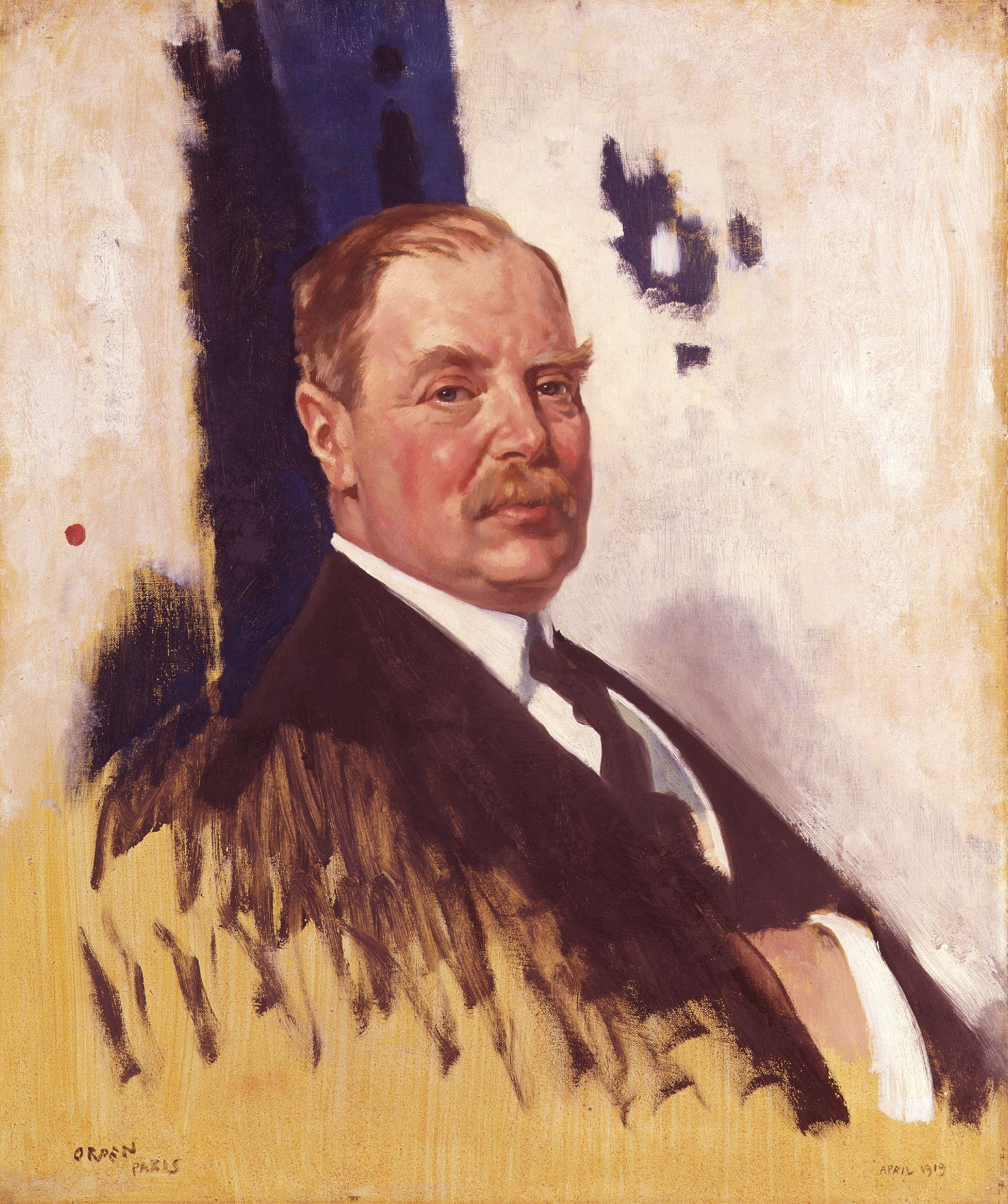
Tranquil's owner Lord Derby

Tranquil began her second season by winning the Berkshire Handicap over seven furlongs at Newbury Racecourse in April. On 4 May the filly started 5/2 favourite in a sixteen-runner field for the 1000 Guineas over the Rowley Mile course at Newmarket. Ridden by Ted Gardner she won the race "comfortably" by one and a half lengths from the Queen Mary Stakes winner Cos with a length back to Shrove in third. The second and third were both owned by the Aga Khan. After the race one British writer described her as the best filly since Sceptre.

On 8 of June Tranquil started favourite for the 145th running of the Oaks Stakes over one and a half miles at Epsom Racecourse. She was unable to obtain a clear run in the straight and came home fourth behind Brownhylda, Shrove and Teresina. Later that month she finished unplaced behind Paola in the Coronation Stakes over one mile at Royal Ascot. The ground at Newmarket was unusually hard and dry in the late summer of 1923, and Lord Derby decided to send the filly temporarily to the stable of Jack Joels trainer Charles Morton at Wantage. Tranquil made little impact when she returned to the track at York in August, finishing down the field behind the Derby winner Papyrus in the Duke of York Stakes.

On 13 September at Doncaster Racecourse Tranquil was ridden by Tommy Weston in the 148th running of the St Leger over fourteen and a half furlongs and started at odds of 11/1 in a thirteen-runner field. Papyrus started favourite while the other fancied runners included Teresina, Parth, Ellangowan and Doric. After tracking the early leaders Tranquil drew alongside Papyrus in the straight, before pulling away to win by two lengths.

On her next appearance Tranquil ran in the Jockey Club Stakes over fourteen furlongs at Newmarket on 4 October for which she started the 1/3 favourite and finished third behind the colts Inkerman and Legality. On 1 November at Newmarket Tranquil was moved up in distance for two and quarter mile Jockey Club and won by a length and a half at odds of 1/5 from Abe Bailey's colt Apron. Tranquil won two other races in 1923, namely the Newmarket Oaks over 14 furlongs and the Liverpool St Leger on 7 November, beating the colt Twelve Pointer by a head in the latter event.

Tranquil ended the year with earnings of £20,707, making her the most financially successful horse of the season.

=== 1924: four-year-old season ===
Tranquil remained in training as a four-year-old and won one minor race, namely the Copeland Stakes. She was scheduled to run in the Coronation Cup at Epsom in June but was withdrawn owing to the exceptionally heavy ground. Tranquil was injured in late summer and did not race again.

== Assessment and honours ==
In their book, A Century of Champions, based on the Timeform rating system, John Randall and Tony Morris rated Tranquil as a "superior" winner of the 1000 Guineas but an "inferior" winner of the St Leger.

== Breeding record ==
Tranquil was retired from racing to become a broodmare for Lord Derby's stud. She produced at least four foals between 1926 and 1935:

- Saint Leger, a chestnut colt, foaled in 1926, sired by Gainsborough
- Salaam, filly, 1928, by Papyrus
- Nevada, brown filly, 1929, by Colorado
- Headway, brown colt, 1935, by Fairway

Tranquil was euthanised in October 1938.

== Pedigree ==
Pedigree of Tranquil (GB), bay mare, 1920
Sire Swynford (GB) 1907	John O'Gaunt (GB); 1901	Isinglass	Isonomy
Sire Swynford (GB) 1907	John O'Gaunt (GB); 1901	Isinglass	Dead Lock
Sire Swynford (GB) 1907	John O'Gaunt (GB); 1901	La Fleche	St. Simon
Sire Swynford (GB) 1907	John O'Gaunt (GB); 1901	La Fleche	Quiver
Sire Swynford (GB) 1907	Canterbury Pilgrim (GB); 1893	Tristan	Hermit
Sire Swynford (GB) 1907	Canterbury Pilgrim (GB); 1893	Tristan	Thrift
Sire Swynford (GB) 1907	Canterbury Pilgrim (GB); 1893	Pilgrimage	The Palmer
Sire Swynford (GB) 1907	Canterbury Pilgrim (GB); 1893	Pilgrimage	Lady Audley
Dam Serenissima (GB) 1913	Minoru (GB); 1906	Cyllene	Bona Vista
Dam Serenissima (GB) 1913	Minoru (GB); 1906	Cyllene	Arcadia
Dam Serenissima (GB) 1913	Minoru (GB); 1906	Mother Siegel	Friar's Balsam
Dam Serenissima (GB) 1913	Minoru (GB); 1906	Mother Siegel	sister to Hellena
Dam Serenissima (GB) 1913	Gondolette (GB); 1902	Loved One	See Saw
Dam Serenissima (GB) 1913	Gondolette (GB); 1902	Loved One	Pilgrimage
Dam Serenissima (GB) 1913	Gondolette (GB); 1902	Dongola	Doncaster
Dam Serenissima (GB) 1913	Gondolette (GB); 1902	Dongola	Douranee (Family 6-e)

- Tranquil was inbred 3 × 4 to Pilgrimage, meaning that this mare appear in both the third and fourth generations of her pedigree.
