= Tide-way =

Thoroughbred racehorse

- Sire: Fairway
- Grandsire: Phalaris
- Dam: Drift
- Damsire: Swynford
- Sex: Mare
- Foaled: 1933
- Country: United Kingdom
- Colour: Brown
- Breeder: Edward Stanley, 17th Earl of Derby
- Owner: 17th Earl of Derby
- Trainer: Colledge Leader
- Record: 6: 3-0-0

Major wins
- Fulbourne Stakes (1935); Ham Produce Stakes (1935); 1000 Guineas (1936)

Tide-way (foaled 1933 – after 1943) was a British Thoroughbred racehorse and broodmare. She was rated one of the best British two-year-old fillies of 1935 when she won twice from four starts. She won the 1000 Guineas on her debut as a three-year-old but finished unplaced in the Epsom Oaks and never ran again. As a broodmare she produced the Eclipse Stakes winner Gulf Stream.

== Background ==
Tide-way was a brown mare bred and owned by Edward Stanley, 17th Earl of Derby. During her racing career she was trained by Colledge Leader at Lord Derby's Stanley House stable in Newmarket, Suffolk. Physically, she was described as "a charming filly, perhaps a little light on the leg, but level of back and of great quality".

Tide-way was sired by Fairway, an outstanding racehorse who won the St Leger, the Eclipse Stakes and two runnings of the Champion Stakes. At stud his other winners included Blue Peter, Watling Street, Garden Path, Pay Up and Fair Trial. Tide-way's dam Drift was a successful racehorse but an even better broodmare whose other foals included Sun Stream and Heliopolis.

== Racing career ==
=== 1935: two-year-old season ===
At Royal Ascot in June Tide-way showed good early speed butfinished unplaced behind Fair Ranee in the Queen Mary Stakes. In the following month at Newmarket Racecourse the filly started favourite for the Fulbourne Stakes and won "fairly and squarely" from the colt Pay Up. She went on to win the Ham Produce Stakes at Goodwood Racecourse and was unplaced on her only other start.

In the Free Handicap, a ranking of the year's best juveniles, Tide-Way was rated the third best filly behind Sansonnet (National Stakes and Crosspatch (Molecomb Stakes).

=== 1936: three-year-old season ===
In the 123rd running of the 1000 Guineas over the Rowley Mile course on 1 May Tide-way was ridden by Dick Perryman and started at odds of 100/30 against 21 opponents. Racing down the centre of the wide track, Tide-way was in front soon after half-way, fought off a challenge from the favourite Ferrybridge and pulled clear in the final strides to record a "very popular victory". She won by one and a half lengths from her stablemate Feola, with Ferrybridge a neck away in third.

Tide-way was aimed at the Epsom Oaks but was found to be "not herself" and was considered a doubtful runner in the week before the race. Leader also had problems training the filly owing to the exceptionally firm ground in the early summer of 1936. She nevertheless started favourite and appeared be going very well as the runners approached the straight but tired badly and finished eighth behind Lovely Rosa.

Tide-way did not race again and was retired at the end of the season.

== Assessment and honours ==
In their book, A Century of Champions, based on the Timeform rating system, John Randall and Tony Morris rated Tide-way a "poor" winner of the 1000 Guineas.

== Breeding record ==
After her retirement from racing, Tide-way became a broodmare at Lord Derby's stud. She produced at least four foals between 1938 and 1943:

- Estuary, a bay filly, foaled in 1938, sired by Orwell
- Ebb and Flow, bay filly, 1940, by Solario
- Forest Law, brown filly, 1942, by Bois Roussel
- Gulf Stream, bay colt, 1943, by Hyperion. Won Eclipse Stakes, second in Epsom Derby.

== Pedigree ==
Pedigree of Tide-way (GB), brown mare, 1933
Sire Fairway (GB) 1925	Phalaris (GB); 1913	Polymelus	Cyllene
Sire Fairway (GB) 1925	Phalaris (GB); 1913	Polymelus	Maid Marian
Sire Fairway (GB) 1925	Phalaris (GB); 1913	Bromus	Sainfoin
Sire Fairway (GB) 1925	Phalaris (GB); 1913	Bromus	Cheery
Sire Fairway (GB) 1925	Scapa Flow (GB); 1914	Chaucer	St Simon
Sire Fairway (GB) 1925	Scapa Flow (GB); 1914	Chaucer	Canterbury Pilgrim
Sire Fairway (GB) 1925	Scapa Flow (GB); 1914	Anchora	Love Wisely
Sire Fairway (GB) 1925	Scapa Flow (GB); 1914	Anchora	Eryholme
Dam Drift (FR) 1926	Swynford (GB); 1907	John o'Gaunt	Isinglass
Dam Drift (FR) 1926	Swynford (GB); 1907	John o'Gaunt	La Fleche
Dam Drift (FR) 1926	Swynford (GB); 1907	Canterbury Pilgrim	Tristan
Dam Drift (FR) 1926	Swynford (GB); 1907	Canterbury Pilgrim	Pilgrimage
Dam Drift (FR) 1926	Santa Cruz (GB); 1916	Neil Gow	Marco
Dam Drift (FR) 1926	Santa Cruz (GB); 1916	Neil Gow	Chelandry
Dam Drift (FR) 1926	Santa Cruz (GB); 1916	Santa Brigida	St Simon
Dam Drift (FR) 1926	Santa Cruz (GB); 1916	Santa Brigida	Bridget (Family 8-g)

- Tide-way was inbred 3 × 4 to Canterbury Pilgrim, meaning that this mare appears in both the third and fourth generations of her pedigree. She was also inbred 4 × 4 to St Simon.
