= Sansovino (horse) =

British-bred Thoroughbred racehorse

- Sire: Swynford
- Grandsire: John O'Gaunt
- Dam: Gondolette
- Damsire: Loved One
- Sex: Stallion
- Foaled: 1921
- Died: 1940 (aged 18–19)
- Country: United Kingdom of Great Britain and Ireland
- Colour: Bay
- Breeder: Lord Derby
- Owner: Lord Derby
- Trainer: George Lambton
- Record: 12: 6-1-1

Major wins
- Gimcrack Stakes (1922); Epsom Derby (1924); Prince of Wales's Stakes (1924)

Sansovino (1921–1940) was a British Thoroughbred racehorse and sire. In a career which lasted from 1922 to 1924, he ran twelve times and won six races. His most significant victory came as a three-year-old in 1924 when he won The Derby by six lengths in some of the most difficult conditions in the race's history. He went on to have a modestly successful career at stud.

== Background ==
Sansovino, a big, powerful bay horse, was one of sixteen Classic winners bred by his owner Lord Derby, who named the colt after the sixteenth-century Italian architect Jacopo Sansovino.

Sansovino's sire, Swynford, who was also owned by Lord Derby, was a racehorse who won the St Leger Stakes in 1910 and went on to be a Champion sire in 1923. Swynford also sired the dual classic-winning fillies Saucy Sue (1000 Guineas, Oaks) and Tranquil (Oaks, St Leger) and the three-time Champion sire Blandford. Sansovino's dam Gondolette has been described as “one of the most famous mares in the Stud Book”. She was the dam of Sansovino's full sister Ferry (1000 Guineas) and the direct, female-line ancestor of such notable thoroughbreds as Hyperion, Sickle, Pharamond, Big Game and Snow Knight.

Sansovino was trained throughout his career by Lord Derby's private trainer George Lambton at the Stanley House stable at Newmarket, Suffolk.

== Racing career ==
=== 1923: two-year-old season ===
Sansovino was sent to Goodwood in July for his first racecourse appearance and won the six furlong Ham Produce Stakes by a length from Cleone in a time of 1:15.2. A month later, he was moved up in class for the Gimcrack Stakes, again over six furlongs at York. Sansovino won comfortably, beating Dandelion by three quarters of a length but did not run again that season.

=== 1924: three-year-old season ===
Sansovino made his three-year-old debut at Birmingham Racecourse (a venue which closed in 1965), starting at odds of 1/5 against moderate opposition. He was not impressive in narrowly defeating a horse named Rugeley, but the form was boosted to an extent when the runner-up won the Chester Cup in May. Sansovino's next start was in the Newmarket Stakes a recognised trial race for The Derby. He finished only third but did little wrong in being beaten a head and a neck by the top-class colts Hurstwood and Salmon-Trout after being unsuited by the slow pace and having been badly hampered in the closing stages.

Sansovino's position as a major contender for the Derby was not, however, established on the public racecourse but in a private trial on the Newmarket training gallops. He was matched against his older stable companions Tranquil and Pharos and won by six lengths, despite receiving only three pounds in weight. The official weight-for-age scale suggests that a three-year-old should be receiving around fifteen pounds from a four-year-old at this point in the season, so the performance was extremely impressive. Indeed, according to one story, one of the riders of the beaten horses rushed home, pawned his wife's jewellery, and wagered the money raised on Sansovino for the Derby before the bookmakers learned of the outcome of the trial.

The Derby of 1924 was run in some of the worst conditions ever seen at Epsom, although the race still attracted a huge crowd, including the King and Queen. Two of the races on the card were abandoned as persistent heavy rain reduced much of the course to mud. Hundreds of cars and buses were stranded on the course as they sank into the "sodden turf". Sansovino was regarded as a certain stayer and started favourite at 9/2, although, as Lord Derby pointed out in reference to the conditions he had "no practice at swimming." The weather had an undoubted influence on the running of the race: the rain-soaked starting tapes broke twice, leading to two false starts and several horses were hampered when one runner slipped and fell at Tattenham corner. Ridden by the twenty-one-year-old lightweight, Tommy Weston, Sansovino started slowly but was soon prominent as Dawson City set the pace. He was in the lead at half way and already clear turning for home. In the straight he pulled steadily further away from the field to win by six lengths from St Germans, with Hurstwood a neck away in third. The winning time of 2:46.00 was the slowest since the 2:47.0 recorded by Jeddah in 1898. The victory was enthusiastically received, with Lord Derby, whose ancestor had given his name to the race, becoming the first member of his family to own the winner since the 12th Earl in 1787. After the race Lambton claimed that he had "felt confident for months that Sansovino would win" and that he had achieved his life's ambition.

The race was also responsible for a small but famous alteration to Lord Derby's racing colours. Weston accidentally buttoned his white scarf through his black outer jacket. The resulting "white button" was preserved in all subsequent editions of the colours seen most recently being carried by the Breeders' Cup winner Ouija Board.

Two weeks after the Derby, Sansovino was sent to Royal Ascot where he won the Prince of Wales's Stakes, beating St Germans "in good style". Later in the same week he ran in the Hardwicke Stakes but finished unplaced behind the four-year-old Chosroes. The colt was prepared for the St Leger but contracted a respiratory infection that spread among British racehorses in the autumn which left him coughing and disrupted his training. Lambton wanted to rest Sansovino, but Lord Derby insisted that he should run in the St Leger as the colt had already been heavily wagered on for the race by members of the public (Lord Derby himself never gambled). Sansovino was unable to reproduce his mid-season form and finished unplaced behind Salmon-Trout, although The Times, pointing out that he looked well short of peak condition, felt that he was "not disgraced".

=== 1925: four-year-old season ===
Sansovino's four-year-old season began promisingly as he beat the 2000 Guineas winner Diophon over a mile in the Spring Stakes at Lingfield but in his remaining races, he was disappointing. He returned to Epsom for his next two starts, finishing unplaced in the City and Suburban Handicap and then running six lengths second to St Germans in the Coronation Cup. On his final start he was injured when finishing unplaced in the Jockey Club Cup at Newmarket.

== Assessment ==
In their book A Century of Champions, John Randall and Tony Morris rated Sansovino as an “inferior” Derby winner.

At the end of his three-year-old campaign one correspondent offered the view that Sansovino was "only a fair performer" who had emerged in a year with no outstanding horses.

The Sansovino Handicap was run in the horse's honour at Belmont Park in the 1930s.

== Stud career ==
As a sire Sansovino was described as “a disappointment, but still useful.”. His most important offspring were Sandwich who won the St Leger in 1931 and the filly Sansonnet, a champion two-year-old who became the dam of Tudor Minstrel. Sansovino died in October 1940.

== Sire line tree ==
- Sansovino
  - Jacopo
    - Johake
    - Robert Morris
    - Rush Act
  - Sandwich
    - Anchois
  - Sans Crainte
    - Gaio
  - Portofino
    - Colonus
    - Attley
  - Sans Peine
  - Buckleigh
  - Sansofine
  - Shahali
  - Black Domino
  - Monument
  - St Magnus
    - St Fairy
    - San Martin
    - Star Knight
  - Snowfall
  - Faroe

== Pedigree ==
Pedigree of Sansovino (GB), bay stallion, 1921
Sire Swynford (GB) 1907	John O'Gaunt; 1901	Isinglass	Isonomy
Sire Swynford (GB) 1907	John O'Gaunt; 1901	Isinglass	Dead Lock
Sire Swynford (GB) 1907	John O'Gaunt; 1901	La Fleche	St Simon
Sire Swynford (GB) 1907	John O'Gaunt; 1901	La Fleche	Quiver
Sire Swynford (GB) 1907	Canterbury Pilgrim; 1893	Tristan	Hermit
Sire Swynford (GB) 1907	Canterbury Pilgrim; 1893	Tristan	Thrift*
Sire Swynford (GB) 1907	Canterbury Pilgrim; 1893	Pilgrimage*	The Palmer*
Sire Swynford (GB) 1907	Canterbury Pilgrim; 1893	Pilgrimage*	Lady Audley*
Dam Gondolette (GB) 1902	Loved One; 1883	See Saw	Buccaneer
Dam Gondolette (GB) 1902	Loved One; 1883	See Saw	Margery Daw
Dam Gondolette (GB) 1902	Loved One; 1883	Pilgrimage*	The Palmer*
Dam Gondolette (GB) 1902	Loved One; 1883	Pilgrimage*	Lady Audley*
Dam Gondolette (GB) 1902	Dongola; 1883	Doncaster	Stockwell*
Dam Gondolette (GB) 1902	Dongola; 1883	Doncaster	Marigold
Dam Gondolette (GB) 1902	Dongola; 1883	Douranee	Rosicrucian
Dam Gondolette (GB) 1902	Dongola; 1883	Douranee	Fenella (Family: 6-e)

* Sansovino is inbred 3S x 3D to the mare Pilgrimage, meaning that she appears third generation on the sire side of his pedigree, and third generation on the dam side of his pedigree.

* Sansovino is inbred 5S x 4D to the stallion Stockwell, meaning that he appears fifth generation (via Thrift) on the sire side of his pedigree, and fourth generation on the dam side of his pedigree.
