= Happy Knight =

British Thoroughbred racehorse

- Sire: Colombo
- Grandsire: Manna
- Dam: Happy Morn
- Damsire: D'Orsay
- Sex: Stallion
- Foaled: 1943
- Country: United Kingdom
- Colour: Bay
- Breeder: Sir William Cooke
- Owner: Sir William Cooke
- Trainer: Henri Jelliss; George Todd
- Record: 16: 3-x-x

Major wins
- 2000 Guineas (1946)

Happy Knight (1943 – 19 September 1963) was a British Thoroughbred racehorse and sire, best known for winning the classic 2000 Guineas in 1946. After finishing unplaced on his only run a two-year-old in 1945, he was an emphatic winner of the 2000 Guineas on his first appearance of 1946. He ran poorly when strongly-fancied for The Derby and never recovered his Guineas form although he won two races as a five-year-old in 1948. He made no impact at stud.

== Background ==
Happy Knight was a "big, strong, rather coarse" bay colt with a small white star bred in England by his owner William Cooke, a noted huntsman and orchid grower who had established his Wyld Court Stud at Newbury, Berkshire in 1912. He was one of two classic winners sired by Colombo an outstanding two-year-old who went on to win the 2000 Guineas in 1934. Happy Knight's dam Happy Morn, had previously produced Happy Landing who finished third in the 1944 Derby Stakes. Happy Morn was a great-granddaughter of the influential broodmare Flitters, whose other female-line descendants have included Blenheim, Footstepsinthesand, Power, Westerner and Golden Lilac.

The colt was sent into training with the Belgian Henri Albert Jelliss at his Beverley House stable in Newmarket, Suffolk. Jelliss had been a successful jockey, winning three classics including the 1935 Epsom Oaks on Quashed, before setting up as a trainer in 1937.

== Racing career ==
Happy Knight showed little promise as a two-year-old, finishing unplaced on his only start at Newmarket Racecourse but was highly regarded and considered a serious contender for the classics. The top-rated juvenile of the year was Lord Derby's Gulf Stream, the winner of the Gimcrack Stakes.

The end of the War meant that 1946 saw the first full season of flat racing in Britain since 1939. The winter of 1945/1946 was unusually severe and many of the leading three-year-olds were held up in their preparation for the major spring races. Happy Knight was still a maiden when he contested the 138th running of the 2000 Guineas at Newmarket Racecourse on his three-year-old debut. The race, run on 1 May, returned to its traditional Rowley Mile course after being run over the July course for the last six years. Ridden by Tommy Weston, he started a 28/1 outsider in a thirteen-runner field. He won by four lengths and a head from Khaled and Radiotherapy. After the race, Happy Knight was reportedly cut from 50/1 to 3/1 favourite for The Derby. Cooke explained that he had not intended to run the horse at Epsom but had neglected to sign the form that would have cancelled his entry. Despite an interrupted preparation, Happy Knight was joint-favourite for the Derby with Gulf Stream on the eve of the race but finished unplaced behind Airborne.

For the 1947 season, Happy Knight was moved to George Todd's stable at Manton in Wiltshire. He failed to win that year but hon twice over sprint distances as a five-year-old in 1948.

== Assessment ==
In their book A Century of Champions, based on a modified version of the Timeform system, John Randall and Tony Morris rated Happy Knight a "poor" winner of the 2000 Guineas.

== Stud record ==
Happy Knight was retired to stud in 1949, but made very little impact as a breeding stallion. He was euthanized on 19 September 1963.

== Pedigree ==
Pedigree of Happy Knight (GB), bay stallion, 1943
Sire Colombo (GB) 1931	Manna (IRE); 1922	Phalaris	Polymelus
Sire Colombo (GB) 1931	Manna (IRE); 1922	Phalaris	Bromus
Sire Colombo (GB) 1931	Manna (IRE); 1922	Waffles	Buckwheat
Sire Colombo (GB) 1931	Manna (IRE); 1922	Waffles	Lady Mischief
Sire Colombo (GB) 1931	Lady Nairne (GB); 1919	Chaucer	St Simon
Sire Colombo (GB) 1931	Lady Nairne (GB); 1919	Chaucer	Canterbury Pilgrim
Sire Colombo (GB) 1931	Lady Nairne (GB); 1919	Lammermuir	Sunstar
Sire Colombo (GB) 1931	Lady Nairne (GB); 1919	Lammermuir	Montem
Dam Happy Morn (GB) 1930	D'Orsay (GB); 1920	Son-in-Law	Dark Ronald
Dam Happy Morn (GB) 1930	D'Orsay (GB); 1920	Son-in-Law	Mother-in-Law
Dam Happy Morn (GB) 1930	D'Orsay (GB); 1920	My Dame	Littleton
Dam Happy Morn (GB) 1930	D'Orsay (GB); 1920	My Dame	Estelle
Dam Happy Morn (GB) 1930	Cicely (GB); 1919	Cicero	Cyllene
Dam Happy Morn (GB) 1930	Cicely (GB); 1919	Cicero	Gas
Dam Happy Morn (GB) 1930	Cicely (GB); 1919	Flittervil	Marcovil
Dam Happy Morn (GB) 1930	Cicely (GB); 1919	Flittervil	Flitters (Family 1-e)
