= Tommy Weston (jockey) =

British horse racing jockey

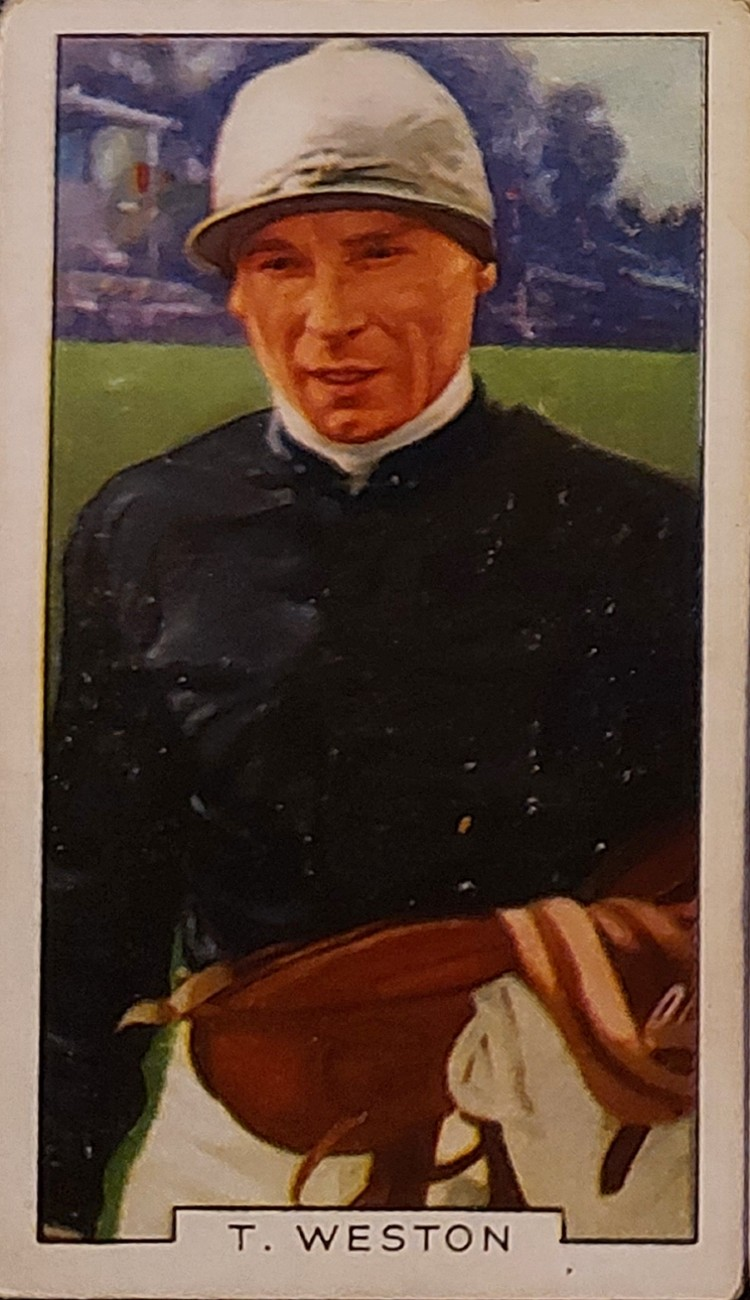
- Tommy Weston, in the colours of Lord Derby (Gallaher's cigarette card, 1936)

Personal information
- Born: 4 February 1902 Dewsbury, West Riding of Yorkshire, England
- Died: 21 January 1981 (aged 78) Ely, Cambridgeshire, England
- Occupation: Jockey

Horse racing career
- Sport: Horse racing
- Career wins: 1,455

Major racing wins
- British Classic Race wins: 1000 Guineas Stakes (1930); 2000 Guineas Stakes (1926, 1946); Derby Stakes (1924, 1933); Oaks Stakes (1927, 1928, 1936); St Leger Stakes (1923, 1928, 1933); Other major race wins: Champion Stakes (1924, 1928, 1929); Coronation Cup (1932, 1937); Dewhurst Stakes (1927, 1932); Eclipse Stakes (1927, 1928, 1931); Gold Cup (1930, 1935); Goodwood Cup (1931, 1935, 1936); July Cup (1926); Middle Park Stakes (1927); St. James's Palace Stakes (1932)

Racing awards
- British flat racing Champion Jockey (1926)

Significant horses
- Beam, Colorado, Fair Isle, Fairway, Happy Knight, Hyperion, Lovely Rosa, Pharamond, Pharos, Sansovino, Toboggan, Tranquil

Thomas Weston (February 1902 – 1981), born Dewsbury, West Riding of Yorkshire, was a British horse racing jockey. One of the most successful jockeys of the inter-war years, he won eleven English Classics, eight as stable jockey for the Earl of Derby including two Derby Stakes winners in Sansovino and Hyperion. He was British flat racing Champion Jockey in 1926.

== Early life ==
Weston was the son of a railway waggon driver. Through his father, who was a fan of multiple championship winning jockey Steve Donoghue, he developed an interest in the sport of horse racing. Aged 14 and weighing just 4 st 3 lb (26.8 kg), he became apprentice to Middleham trainer Ned McCormack, a stable controlled by a bookmaker.

== Career ==
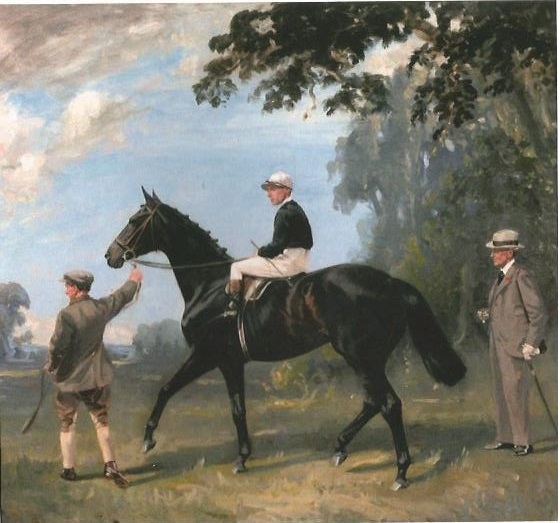
Tranquil with trainer, George Lambton and jockey Tommy Weston, by Lynwood Palmer (1923)

He rode his first winner at Newmarket on 30 October 1918 on a horse called Miss Richard. and his first notable win in the Jubilee Handicap at Kempton Park on Arion. After demonstrating his ability riding Redhead, winner of the Liverpool Summer Cup, for trainer George Lambton, Lambton recommended Weston to Lord Derby to be his retained jockey. Weston rode for Lord Derby for ten years, winning nine Classics.

These started with a win on Tranquil in the 1923 St. Leger, followed by Sansovino in the 1924 Derby at a muddy Epsom. Before the latter, he got his white scarf caught in the top button of his racing top. This was taken as a lucky sign and the famous 'lucky white button' has been incorporated into the Lord Derby colours ever since.

Two years later he was champion jockey in the year that the rider who would come to dominate the championship for the next thirty years, Gordon Richards, was out for nearly the whole season with illness. He would go on to ride the Horse of the Year in five of the next seven seasons – Colorado (1927), Fairway (1928 and 1929), Gold Cup winner Bosworth (1930) and Hyperion (1933), who would go on to become one of the 20th century's foremost sires.

It is argued that Weston should have won himself another Derby with Fairway, but his chance was lost after fans mobbed the horse at the start. The horse eventually proved himself of the highest order in winning the Eclipse Stakes, the St. Leger and the Champion Stakes in two successive years.

In 1933 Weston on Hyperion recorded what has been called "the greatest Derby-winning performance of all time" beating high class rivals by an official margin of four lengths, which from photographs has been shown to be closer to eight. Doubts were raised as to the manner of the victory, however, with the suggestion that Weston was aided in his victory by Steve Donoghue, on Hyperion's stablemate Thrapston, securing a clear passage for him. He won in a then record time of 2 minutes, 34 seconds.

Thrapston set a cracking pace until approaching Tattenham Corner, Steve Donoghue rode Thrapston and Tommy Weston was on Hyperion. Just about at the corner Weston called out something to Donoghue, with the result that Steve obliged and Hyperion got the clear run which carried him to victory.

— Evening Post, Wellington, 10 July 1935

Hyperion followed up in the St. Leger.

The partnership between Lord Derby and Weston was dissolved in 1934, without any explanation. It has been suggested that Weston was in conflict with Colledge Leader, Lambton's successor as Lord Derby's trainer, a situation exacerbated when Hyperion lost that year's Ascot Gold Cup. Weston's career was not the same afterwards, although he helped South African millionaire owner Sir Abe Bailey win his first Classic in forty years, when winning the 1936 Oaks on Lovely Rosa, said to be the worst Oaks winner of the 20th century.

During World War II, he saw active service with the Royal Navy and was sunk twice. For a time he was stationed at Ebrington Barracks in Derry. Future speed record breaker Donald Campbell and composer Ivor Novello frequented the cafe opposite.

After the war, he returned to win the 2,000 Guineas on Happy Knight and a Lincolnshire Handicap on Langton Abbot.

== Riding style ==
During his career, Weston was a very popular jockey and has been described as "a dashing jockey, with very sympathetic hands" and "combining great dash and courage... but liable to be somewhat erratic." Of his riding, author Quintin Gilbey wrote, "No jockey rode a more vigorous finish and his records showed that though inelegant he was most effective. He was in fact a far better jockey than he appeared to be from the stands." In frantic finishes, he was known for losing his cap.

== Personal life ==
Weston was a close friend of entertainer George Formby, who himself was once an apprentice jockey.

He bought his 1927 Eclipse Stakes winner, Cap-a-Pie, after its retirement, for £26 5s at an auction at Folkestone Racecourse, then took it away to be humanely destroyed, allegedly to save it from the dishonour of being used as a cart horse or worse.

== Retirement ==
He retired in 1950 and stayed in Newmarket. In later life he was a "sad figure", having spent all the money he made. He died, aged 78, in 1981 at Ely Hospital.

== Major wins ==
(United Kingdom) Great Britain

- 1000 Guineas Stakes – Fair Isle (1930)
- 2000 Guineas Stakes – (2) – Colorado (1926), Happy Knight (1946)
- Derby Stakes – (2) – Sansovino (1924), Hyperion (1933)
- Oaks Stakes – (3) – Beam (1927), Toboggan (1928), Lovely Rosa (1936)
- St Leger Stakes – (3) – Tranquil (1923), Fairway (1928), Hyperion (1933)
- Ascot Gold Cup – (2) – Bosworth (1930), Tiberius (1935)
- Ascot Gold Vase – Gainslaw (1933)
- Champion Stakes – (3) – Pharos (1924), Fairway (1928), Fairway (1929)
- Coronation Cup – (2) – Salmon Leap (1932), Cecil (1937)
- Dewhurst Stakes – (2) – Toboggan (1927), Hyperion (1932)
- Eclipse Stakes – (3) – Colorado (1927), Fairway (1928), Caerleon (1931)
- Goodwood Cup – (3) – Salmon Leap (1931), Tiberius (1935), Cecil (1936)
- July Cup – Phalaros (1926)
- Middle Park Stakes – Pharamond (1927)
- Princess of Wales's Stakes – Colorado (1927)
- Richmond Stakes – Bobsleigh (1934)
- Stewards' Cup – Figaro (1934)
- St. James's Palace Stakes – Andrea (1932)

== Biography ==
- Weston, Tommy; White, Sydney H. (1952). My Racing Life. London: Hutchinson's.

== Bibliography ==
- Wright, Howard (1986). The Encyclopaedia of Flat Racing. London: Robert Hale. ISBN 0-7090-2639-0.
