= Pay Up (horse) =

British Thoroughbred racehorse

- Sire: Fairway
- Grandsire: Phalaris
- Dam: Book Debt
- Damsire: Buchan
- Sex: Stallion
- Foaled: 1933
- Country: United Kingdom
- Colour: Brown
- Breeder: Waldorf Astor, 2nd Viscount Astor
- Owner: Lord Astor
- Trainer: Joseph Lawson
- Record: 7: 3-2-1
- Earnings: £11,344

Major wins
- Free Handicap (1936); 2000 Guineas (1936)

Pay Up (1933 – 16 July 1960) was a British Thoroughbred racehorse and sire. As a two-year-old in 1935 he showed promise as he won one race and was place in his other three starts. In the following spring he won the Free Handicap and then recorded his biggest success in the 2000 Guineas. He started favourite for Epsom Derby but finished fourth, sustaining leg injuries which ended his track career. He had little success as a breeding stallion.

== Background ==
Pay Up was a "stylish" brown horse bred and owned by Waldorf Astor, 2nd Viscount Astor. He was trained throughout his racing career by Joseph Lawson at Manton, Wiltshire.

Pay Up was sired by Fairway, an outstanding racehorse who won the St Leger, the Eclipse Stakes and two runnings of the Champion Stakes. At stud his other winners included Blue Peter, Watling Street, Garden Path, Tide-way and Fair Trial. Pay Up's dam Book Debt was a daughter of Popingaol, who won two minor races but became a very successful broodmare whose other foals included Book Law, Pogrom, Splendid Jay (Yorkshire Oaks) and Fair Cop (female-line ancestor of Provoke).

== Racing career ==
=== 1935: two-year-old season ===
Pay Up began his racing career by finishing third behind Yesta and Doublure in the Sorrel Plate over five furlongs at Hurst Park. On the last day of the July meeting at Newmarket Racecourse, he ran second to Lord Derby's filly Tide-Way (later to win the 1000 Guineas) in the Fulbourne Stakes. The colt went on to finish second to Thrustaway in the Kingston Plate at Sandown Park before recording his first success on his final start of the season when he won the Autumn Breeders' Foal Stakes at Manchester Racecourse from Silver Crest.

=== 1936: three-year-old season ===
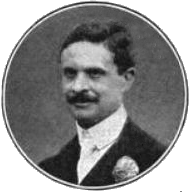
Lord Astor, who owned and bred Pay Up

Pay Up made a successful first appearance as a three-year-old when he won the Free Handicap over seven furlongs at Newmarket in mid-April. On 29 April the colt, ridden by Robert "Bobby" Dick, started at odds of 11/2 in a nineteen-runner field for the 128th running of the 2000 Guineas over the Rowley Mile course. The other fancied contenders included Abjer (Middle Park Stakes), Bala Hissar (Dewhurst Stakes), Monument (Craven Stakes), Rhodes Scholar and Mahmoud. After taking the lead Pay Up was headed by Mahmoud, but rallied strongly in the final strides to win by a short head in a "thrilling" finish, with three lengths back to Thankerton in third. The colt's victory was described as "immensely popular" with the Newmarket crowd.

Pay Up's win in the Guineas elevated him to the top of the betting for the Epsom Derby, a race in which Lord Astor's horses had finished second on five occasions. On 27 May Pay Up started favourite for the Derby over one and a half miles on hard ground but after tracking the leaders for most of the way he finished fourth behind Mahmoud, Taj Akbar and Thankerton. After the race Pay Up was badly lame and his retirement from racing was announced two months later.

== Assessment and honours ==
In their book, A Century of Champions, based on the Timeform rating system, John Randall and Tony Morris rated Pay Up an "inferior" winner of the 2000 Guineas.

== Stud record ==
Pay Up began his stud career in 1937 at an initial fee of 250 guineas. He had little success as a sired of winners on the flat but did better with his National Hunt horses. The most notable of his offspring was the mare Nickel Coin who won the Grand National in 1951. Pay Up was euthanised on 16 July 1960.

== Pedigree ==
Pedigree of Pay Up (GB), brown stallion, 1933
| Sire Fairway (GB) 1925 | Phalaris (GB); 1913 | Polymelus | Cyllene |
| Sire Fairway (GB) 1925 | Phalaris (GB); 1913 | Polymelus | Maid Marian |
| Sire Fairway (GB) 1925 | Phalaris (GB); 1913 | Bromus | Sainfoin |
| Sire Fairway (GB) 1925 | Phalaris (GB); 1913 | Bromus | Cheery |
| Sire Fairway (GB) 1925 | Scapa Flow (GB); 1914 | Chaucer | St Simon |
| Sire Fairway (GB) 1925 | Scapa Flow (GB); 1914 | Chaucer | Canterbury Pilgrim |
| Sire Fairway (GB) 1925 | Scapa Flow (GB); 1914 | Anchora | Love Wisely |
| Sire Fairway (GB) 1925 | Scapa Flow (GB); 1914 | Anchora | Eryholme |
| Dam Book Debt (GB) 1925 | Buchan (GB); 1916 | Sunstar | Sundridge |
| Dam Book Debt (GB) 1925 | Buchan (GB); 1916 | Sunstar | Doris |
| Dam Book Debt (GB) 1925 | Buchan (GB); 1916 | Hamoaze | Torpoint |
| Dam Book Debt (GB) 1925 | Buchan (GB); 1916 | Hamoaze | Maid of the Mist |
| Dam Book Debt (GB) 1925 | Popingaol (GB); 1913 | Dark Ronald | Bay Ronald |
| Dam Book Debt (GB) 1925 | Popingaol (GB); 1913 | Dark Ronald | Darkie |
| Dam Book Debt (GB) 1925 | Popingaol (GB); 1913 | Popinjay | St Frusquin |
| Dam Book Debt (GB) 1925 | Popingaol (GB); 1913 | Popinjay | Chelandry (Family 1-n) |
