= Fair Isle (horse) =

British-bred Thoroughbred racehorse

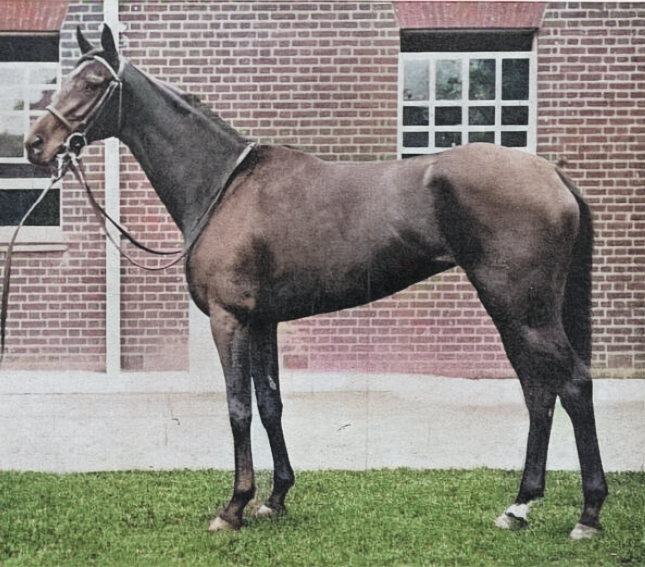
- Fair Isle in 1930.
- Sire: Phalaris
- Grandsire: Polymelus
- Dam: Scapa Flow
- Damsire: Chaucer
- Sex: Mare
- Foaled: 1927
- Country: United Kingdom
- Colour: Bay
- Breeder: 17th Earl of Derby
- Owner: 17th Earl of Derby
- Trainer: Frank Butters
- Record: 10: 5-1-1
- Earnings: £13,219

Major wins
- Champion Breeders' Foal Plate (1929); Buckenham Post Produce Stakes (1929); Bretby Stakes (1929); 1000 Guineas (1930); Midsummer Stakes (1930)

Awards
- Top-rated British 2-y-o filly (1929)

Fair Isle (1927 – 1943) was a British Thoroughbred racehorse and broodmare. She was the top-rated juvenile filly in England in 1929 when she won three of her five races, namely the Champion Breeders' Foal Plate, Buckenham Post Produce Stakes and Bretby Stakes. In the following year she won the 1000 Guineas and Midsummer Stakes as well as finishing fourth in the Epsom Oaks and third in the Champion Stakes. All but one of Fair Isle's wins came at Newmarket Racecourse. As a broodmare, the best of her foals was the Queen Anne Stakes winner St Magnus.

== Background ==
Fair Isle was a small, "frail-looking" bay mare bred in England by her owner Lord Derby and trained during her racing career by Frank Butters at the Stanley House stable in Newmarket, Suffolk.

Both of Fair Isle's parents were also bred by Lord Derby. Her sire Phalaris was an outstanding sprinter who went on to become the most influential stallion of the 20th Century. Her dam, Scapa Flow, also produced Fair Isle's full-brothers Fairway and Pharos.

== Racing career ==
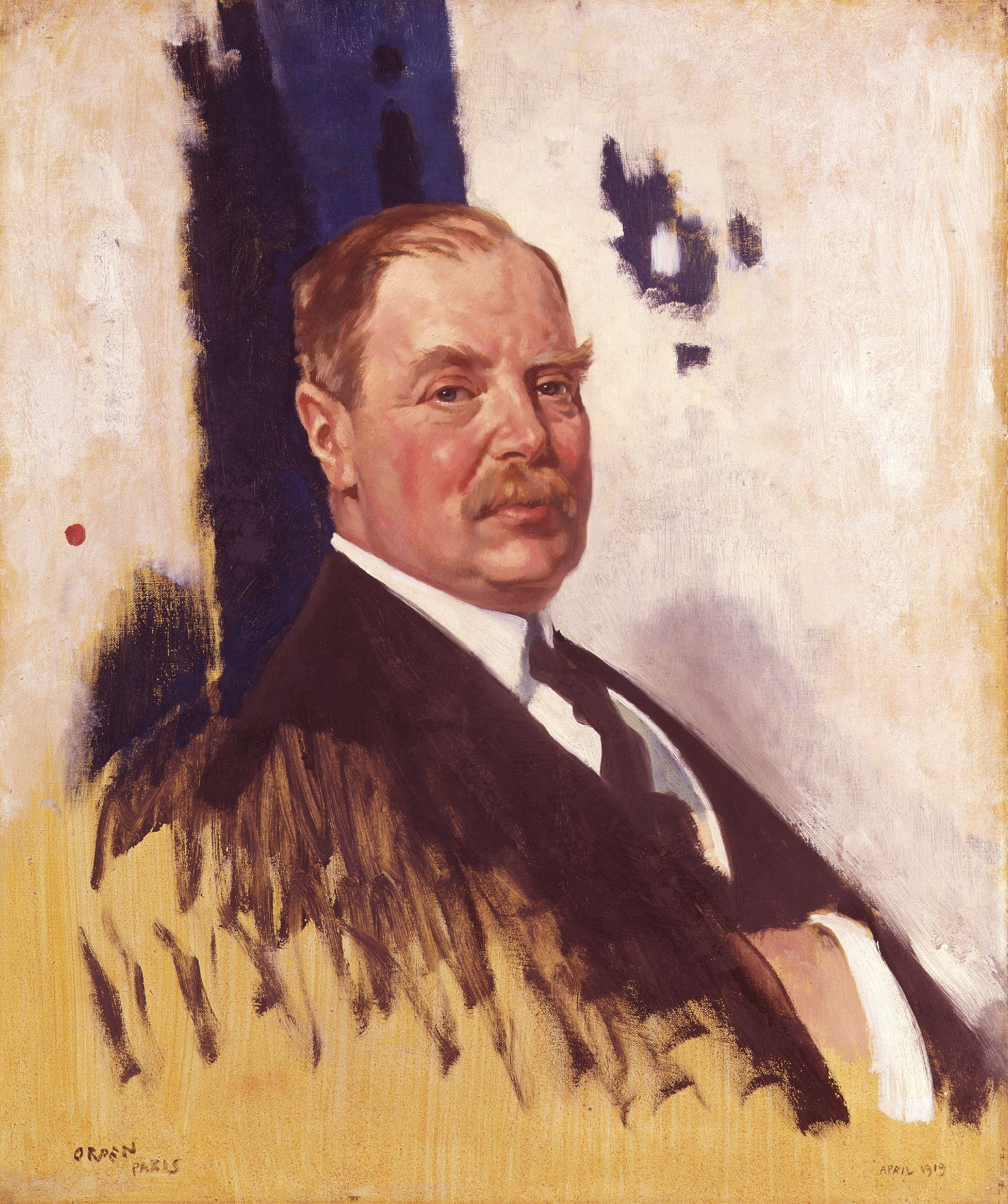
Lord Derby, who bred and owned Fair Isle

=== 1929: two-year-old season ===
Before she raced in public Fair Isle attracted some attention and was reported to be highly regarded by her owner and trainer. On her racecourse debut at Royal Ascot in June the filly contested the Queen Mary Stakes and showed some promise in running fourth behind Qurrat-al-Ain. At Goodwood Racecourse a month later she appeared somewhat unlucky when beaten a short head by Ann Gudman in the Ham Produce Stakes. She recorded her first success in the £1,000 Champion Breeders' Foal Plate at Derby Racecourse, coming home five lengths clear of her rivals at odds of 2/5. At Newmarket in October Fair Isle took the Buckenham Post Produce Stakes and then won the Bretby Stakes from the favourite Fair Diana, leading her to be described as "the best filly" of the year in England.

In the Free Handicap, a ranking of the year's leading two-year-olds, Fair Isle was rated the best filly, four pounds behind the top colt Diolite.

=== 1930: three-year-old season ===
On 9 May, ridden by Tommy Weston, Fair Isle started the 7/4 favourite ahead of Qurrat-Al-Ain and seventeen other opponents for the 117th funning of the 1000 Guineas over the Rowley Mile at Newmarket. Despite the unusually unpleasantly cold and windy conditions, the race attracted a large crowd which included the King. The favourite caused some concern by sweating profusely before the race, but started well and settled behind the leaders as Silver Mount set the early pace. Weston sent the filly into the lead a furlong out and a "tremendous struggle" ensued as first Qurrat-Al-Ain, then Sister Clover and finally Torchere launched strong challenges. Fair Isle displayed "doggedness" and "superb battling qualities" to prevail by a short head and a neck from Torchere and Sister Clover.

Following her win at Newmarket, Fair Isle was made favourite for the Oaks Stakes over one and a half miles at Epsom Racecourse. On her arrival at the course on the day before the race she became highly agitated and refused to eat her usual oats, having to be fed instead on a mixture of stout and eggs. She led the field approaching the final turn but failed to stay the distance and finished fourth behind Rose of England. In July she won the Midsummer Stakes over one mile at Newmarket, carrying 130 pounds to victory in what was described as the most impressive performance of the meeting. The filly was then dropped back to sprint distances and started favourite for the King George Stakes over five furlongs at Goodwood but ran unplaced behind the colt Stingo. On her final appearance, Fair Island finished third behind Rustom Pasha and Grace Dalrymple in a strongly contested edition of the Champion Stakes over ten furlongs at Newmarket in October.

Fair Isle earned a total of £9,423 in 1930, taking her career winnings to £13,219.

== Assessment and honours ==
In their book, A Century of Champions, based on the Timeform rating system, John Randall and Tony Morris rated Fair Isle an "inferior" winner of the 1000 Guineas.

At the end of her racing career, she was described as "a fine miler at her home course of Newmarket, but a nervous filly, unable to be travelled".

== Breeding record ==
Fair Isle was retired from racing to become a broodmare for Lord Derby's stud. She produced at least three foals between 1933 and until her death in 1943:

- St Magnus, a bay colt, foaled 1933, sired by Sansovino. Won Queen Anne Stakes in 1938. Later a successful breeding stallion in South Africa.
- Scepter'd Isle, bay colt, 1936, by Bosworth. Failed to win a race.
- Motherland, bay filly, 1937, by Gainsborough. Failed to win a race.

== Pedigree ==
Pedigree of Fair Isle (GB), bay or brown mare, 1927
Sire Phalaris (GB) 1913	Polymelus; 1902	Cyllene	Bona Vista
Sire Phalaris (GB) 1913	Polymelus; 1902	Cyllene	Arcadia
Sire Phalaris (GB) 1913	Polymelus; 1902	Maid Marian	Hampton
Sire Phalaris (GB) 1913	Polymelus; 1902	Maid Marian	Quiver
Sire Phalaris (GB) 1913	Bromus; 1905	Sainfoin	Springfield
Sire Phalaris (GB) 1913	Bromus; 1905	Sainfoin	Sanda
Sire Phalaris (GB) 1913	Bromus; 1905	Cheery	St Simon*
Sire Phalaris (GB) 1913	Bromus; 1905	Cheery	Sunrise
Dam Scapa Flow (GB) 1914	Chaucer; 1900	St Simon*	Galopin
Dam Scapa Flow (GB) 1914	Chaucer; 1900	St Simon*	St Angela
Dam Scapa Flow (GB) 1914	Chaucer; 1900	Canterbury Pilgrim	Tristan
Dam Scapa Flow (GB) 1914	Chaucer; 1900	Canterbury Pilgrim	Pilgrimage
Dam Scapa Flow (GB) 1914	Anchora; 1905	Love Wisely	Wisdom
Dam Scapa Flow (GB) 1914	Anchora; 1905	Love Wisely	Lovelorn
Dam Scapa Flow (GB) 1914	Anchora; 1905	Eryholme	Hazlehatch
Dam Scapa Flow (GB) 1914	Anchora; 1905	Eryholme	Ayrsmoss (Family: 13-e)

- Fair Isle was inbred 3 × 4 to St. Simon. This means that the stallion appears in both the third and fourth generations of her pedigree.
