= Fair Isle (disambiguation) =

Fair Isle is a Scottish island, in Shetland

Fair Isle can also refer to:

- Fair Isle (knitting), a knitting technique
- Fair Isle (horse), a racehorse
- Fairisle, New Brunswick, a community in New Brunswick, Canada
