= Pay Up =

Pay Up may refer to:

- Pay Up (CSI: NY), an episode of the television series CSI: NY
- Pay Up (horse), a racehorse
- "Pay Up" (song), by American rapper Rhapsody
