= Lovely Rosa =

Irish-bred Thoroughbred racehorse

- Sire: Tolgus
- Grandsire: Stefan the Great
- Dam: Napoule
- Damsire: Bachelors Double
- Sex: Mare
- Foaled: 1933
- Country: Ireland
- Colour: Bay
- Breeder: E J Hope
- Owner: Abe Bailey
- Trainer: Harry Cottrill
- Record: 9: 2-1-2

Major wins
- Epsom Oaks (1936)

Lovely Rosa (1933 – 1951) was an Irish-bred, British-trained Thoroughbred racehorse and broodmare best known for her win in the 1936 Epsom Oaks. As a juvenile in 1945 she showed some promise when finishing second in the Queen Mary Stakes and winning a race at Newbury but then showed little worthwhile form until her 33/1 upset victory in the Oaks. She never won again and was retired at the end of 1936. She had some success as a broodmare, most notably being the grand-dam of Wilwyn.

== Background ==
Lovely Rosa was a bay mare with a white sock on her right hind leg, bred in Ireland by E. J. Hope who had bought her dam Napoule at Dublin for 80 guineas with Lovely Rosa in utero. In 1934 the yearling filly was put up for auction at Dublin and sold for 370 guineas to the trainer Harry Cottrill. Shortly afterwards she was offered for sale at Newmarket bought for 670 guineas by F R MacDonald. In early 1935 she changed hands again when she was bought privately by Abe Bailey. Throughout her racing career she was trained by Cottrill at Lambourn in Berkshire.

She was sired by Tolgus, a fast and precocious colt who won the Imperial Produce Stakes as two-year-old in 1925 before retiring undefeated in six starts. Lovely Rosa's dam Napoule was a half-sister to the Ascot Gold Cup winner Tangiers. As a broodmare she also produced Lovely Naples whose descendants included Lando and many other major winners in Germany

== Racing career ==
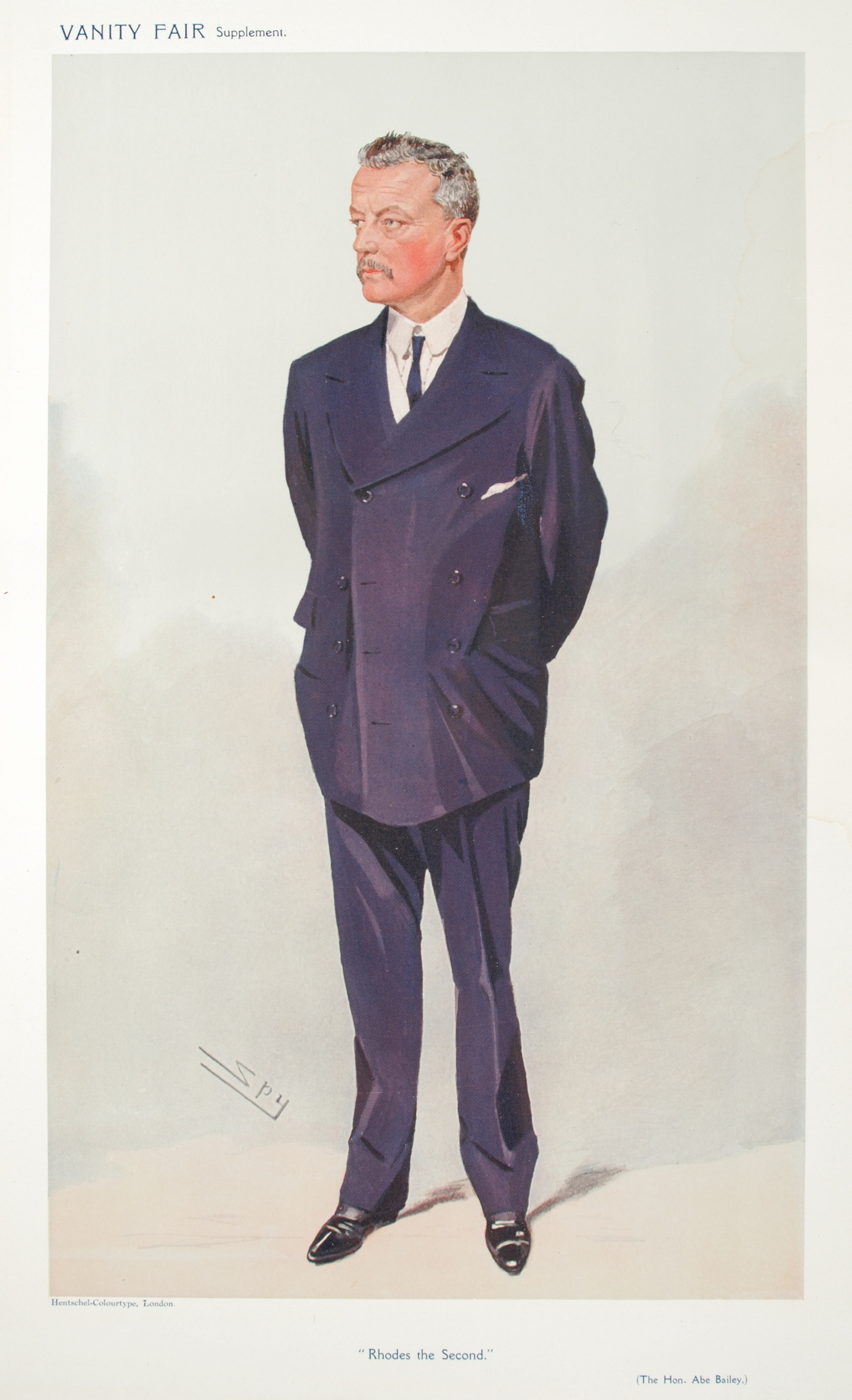
Lovely Rosa's owner, Sir Abe Bailey

=== 1935: two-year-old season ===
As a juvenile in 1935 Lovely Rosa showed good early form, finishing third to Vanbrugh on her debut in the Salisbury Stakes over five furlongs. In June she was sent to Royal Ascot for the Queen Mary Stakes and finished second to Fair Ranee with Traffic Light in third. She then won the Kennett Stakes at Newbury Racecourse but failed to live up to her early promise and finished unplaced in her two subsequent races that year.

=== 1936: three-year-old season ===
On her first run as a three-year-old, Lovely Rosa was one of twenty-two fillies to contest the 1000 Guineas at Newmarket Racecourse and finished unplaced behind Lord Derby's Tide-way. The filly was then moved up in distance for the 158th running of the Oaks Stakes over one and a half miles at Epsom Racecourse on 30 of May in which she was ridden by Tommy Weston and started a 33/1 outsider against 16 opponents. The field appeared to be a strong one, including Tide-Way, Feola (runner-up in the 1000 Guineas), Barrowby Gem, Traffic Light and Veuve Clicquot (Windsor Castle Stakes). Lovely Rosa won by three quarters of a length from Barrowby Gem, who appeared to be a very unlucky loser having been denied a clear run until the final strides. Feola was two lengths back in third ahead of Traffic Light with Veuve Clicquot and Tide-Way in seventh and eighth. Contemporary reports described her victory as "decidedly flukey".

Lovely Rosa was beaten in her subsequent races: she finished third to Crested Crane and Trelissia in the Falmouth Stakes and was unplaced behind Barrowby Gem in the Newmarket Oaks.

== Assessment and honours ==
In their book, A Century of Champions, based on the Timeform rating system, John Randall and Tony Morris rated Lovely Rose the worst Oaks winner of the 20th century and described her classic victory as a "fluke".

== Breeding record ==
At the end of her racing career Lovely Rosa was retired to become a broodmare. In 1940 she was bought for 2,500 guineas by Malcolm McAlpine. She produced at least eight foals and three winners between 1940 and 1951:

- Lovelight, a bay mare, foaled in 1940, sired by Solario.
- Instinct, brown colt, 1941, by Blue Peter.
- Pictavia, brown colt, 1942, by Nearco. Winner.
- Saracen, bay mare, 1943, by Donatello. Won one race. Dam of Wilwyn.
- Postilion, bay colt, 1946, by Owen Tudor. Winner.
- Prickly Rose, chestnut filly, 1948, by Bellacose. Failed to win a race.
- Gilded Rose, bay filly, 1950, by Midas. Failed to win a race.
- Lovely Honey, bay filly, 1951, by Honeyway. Won five races.

Lovely Rosa died in 1951.

== Pedigree ==
Pedigree of Lovely Rosa (IRE), bay mare, 1933
Sire Tolgus (GB) 1923	Stefan the Great (IRE); 1916	The Tetrarch	Roi Herode (FR)
Sire Tolgus (GB) 1923	Stefan the Great (IRE); 1916	The Tetrarch	Vahren (GB)
Sire Tolgus (GB) 1923	Stefan the Great (IRE); 1916	Perfect Peach (GB)	Persimmon
Sire Tolgus (GB) 1923	Stefan the Great (IRE); 1916	Perfect Peach (GB)	Fascination
Sire Tolgus (GB) 1923	Rosa Croft (GB); 1915	Lemberg	Cyllene
Sire Tolgus (GB) 1923	Rosa Croft (GB); 1915	Lemberg	Galicia
Sire Tolgus (GB) 1923	Rosa Croft (GB); 1915	Electric Rose (IRE)	Lesterlin
Sire Tolgus (GB) 1923	Rosa Croft (GB); 1915	Electric Rose (IRE)	Arc Light (GB)
Dam Napoule (GB) 1919	Bachelors Double (IRE); 1906	Tredennis (GB)	Kendal
Dam Napoule (GB) 1919	Bachelors Double (IRE); 1906	Tredennis (GB)	St Marguerite
Dam Napoule (GB) 1919	Bachelors Double (IRE); 1906	Lady Bawn	Le Noir (GB)
Dam Napoule (GB) 1919	Bachelors Double (IRE); 1906	Lady Bawn	Milady (GB)
Dam Napoule (GB) 1919	Orange Girl (GB); 1909	William the Third	St Simon
Dam Napoule (GB) 1919	Orange Girl (GB); 1909	William the Third	Gravity
Dam Napoule (GB) 1919	Orange Girl (GB); 1909	Fair Nell	Gallinule
Dam Napoule (GB) 1919	Orange Girl (GB); 1909	Fair Nell	Adelaide (IRE) (Family 7-b)
