= Fairway (horse) =

British Thoroughbred racehorse

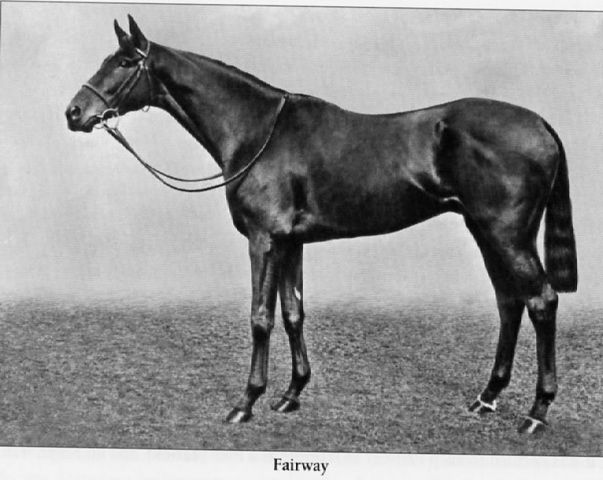
- Fairway c. 1929
- Sire: Phalaris
- Grandsire: Polymelus
- Dam: Scapa Flow
- Damsire: Chaucer
- Sex: Stallion
- Foaled: 1925
- Died: 1948 (aged 22–23)
- Country: United Kingdom
- Colour: Brown
- Breeder: Lord Derby
- Owner: Lord Derby
- Trainer: George Lambton; Frank Butters
- Record: 15: 12-1-0
- Earnings: £ 42,722

Major wins
- Coventry Stakes (1927); July Stakes (1927); Champagne Stakes (1927); Eclipse Stakes (1928); St Leger (1928); Champion Stakes (1928), (1929); Jockey Club Cup (1929); Princess of Wales's Stakes (1929)

Fairway (1925–1948) was a British Thoroughbred racehorse and sire. Fairway was the best horse of his generation in Britain at two, three and four years old, winning the St Leger Stakes, the Champion Stakes (twice) and the Eclipse Stakes. He retired as a five-year-old in 1930 and went on to become a successful and influential sire.

== Background ==
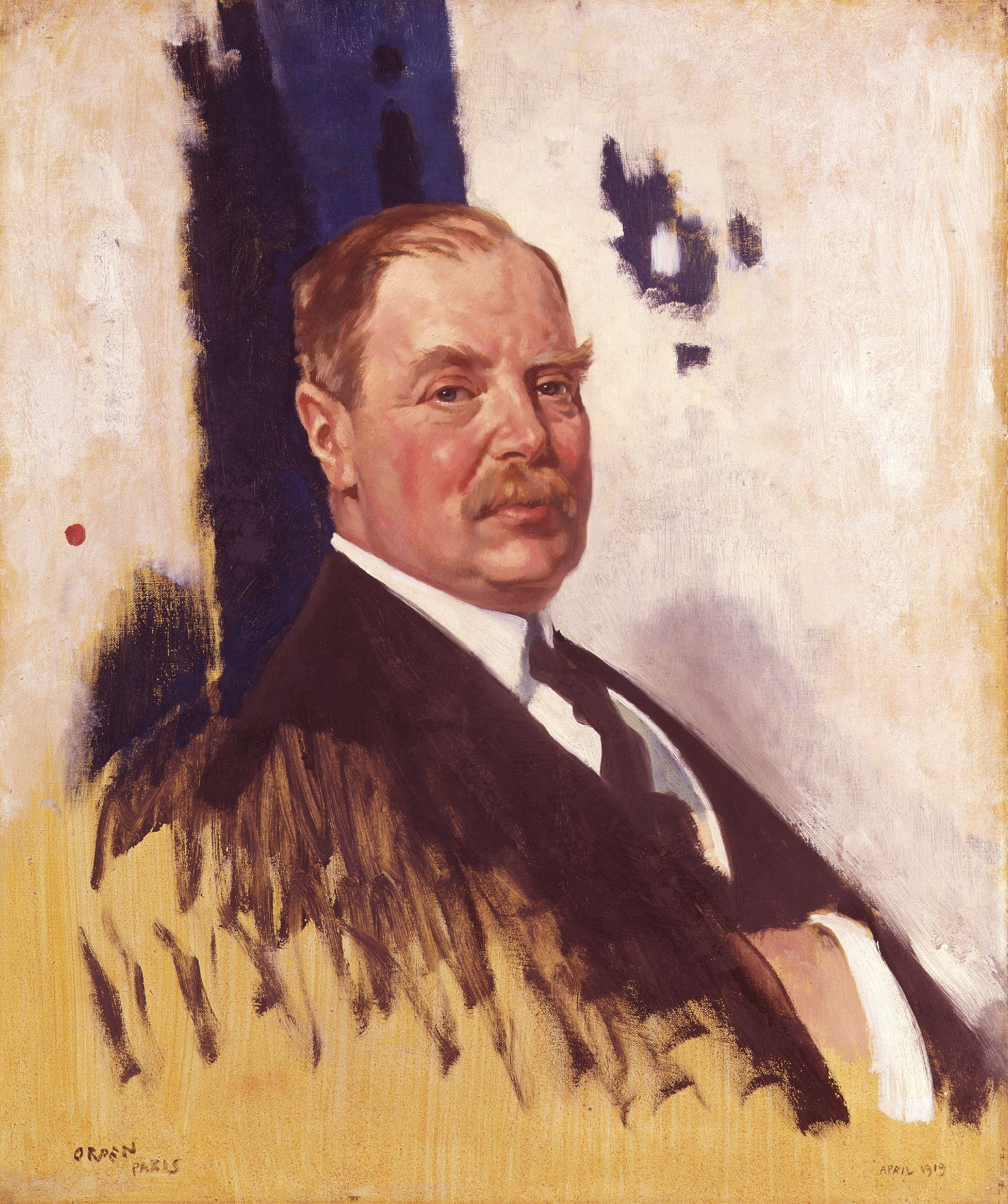
Lord Derby

Fairway was bred in England by his owner Lord Derby who also bred both of his parents. His sire Phalaris was an outstanding sprinter who went on to become the most influential stallion of the 20th century. His dam, Scapa Flow, also produced Fairway's sister Fair Isle who won the 1000 Guineas and his brother Pharos who finished second in The Derby and sired Nearco.

As a two-year-old, Fairway was trained by George Lambton at Lord Derby's Stanley House stable at Newmarket, Suffolk. When Lambton became Lord Derby's racing manager at the end of 1927, Frank Butters took over as the colt's trainer. He was ridden in most of his races by Lord Derby's Dewsbury-born stable jockey Thomas "Tommy" Weston.

== Racing career ==
=== 1927: two-year-old season ===
Fairway began his racecourse career when he ran unplaced in a maiden race at York in May. He won his remaining three races in 1927; the Coventry Stakes at Royal Ascot, the July Stakes at Newmarket Racecourse and the Champagne Stakes at Doncaster in September. By the time of his Doncaster win he was being talked of as a potential Derby winner.

He sustained a minor injury in the last-named race however, and did not appear again that season. In the Free Handicap, he was rated the joint-best colt of the year.

=== 1928: three-year-old season ===
In the spring of 1928, Fairway developed a mouth abscess (or "boils") which forced his late withdrawal from the 2000 Guineas. He was then aimed at the Derby, running his trial in the Newmarket Stakes. Fairway impressed observers before the race and won very easily by two lengths after "sailing past" the strongly fancied Black Watch. At Epsom Fairway was made favourite, but the highly-strung colt became upset by the huge crowd when going down to the start. He was never a threat in the race and finished ninth behind the 33/1 outsider Felstead. After the race, Tommy Weston said "he was beaten after six furlongs, probably because he had so much taken out of him before the actual start."

Fairway returned to his best in the Eclipse Stakes at Sandown which he won by eight lengths from Royal Minstrel in record time In September he started 7/4 favourite for the St Leger, despite concerns that, as the son of sprinter, he would lack the stamina for the one and three quarter mile race. He was ridden with great confidence by Weston, coming from well off the pace to take the lead in the closing stages and win by one and a half lengths from Palais Royal and Cyclonic On his final start of the year he won the Champion Stakes at Newmarket by one and a half lengths "without being in any way hard pressed."

=== 1929: four-year-old season ===
At four, Fairway began with a one length win over three rivals in the Burwell Stakes at Newmarket and then took the Rous Memorial Stakes at Royal Ascot. At the July meeting at Newmarket he won the Princess of Wales's Stakes to take his winning run to six. In his next race he started favourite for the Eclipse Stakes but failed to show his best form and was beaten four lengths by Royal Minstrel.

He was then off the course for three months before returning in October to win the Champion Stakes for the second time from Cyclonic. On his final start of the year he stepped up to two miles and a quarter to win the Jockey Club Cup, "cantering" to a three length victory over Palais Royal.

=== 1930: five-year-old season ===
Fairway was kept in training at five with the intention of winning the Ascot Gold Cup, but was retired without running after sustaining a tendon injury.

== Assessment ==
At the end of his four-year-old season the Bloodstock Breeders' Review described Fairway as "far and away the best horse in England, and probably in the world."

In their book A Century of Champions, John Randall and Tony Morris rated Fairway the thirty-fifth best horse of the 20th Century and the twelfth best to be trained in Britain.

== Stud career ==
Fairway stood as a stallion at the Woodlands Stud at Newmarket from 1931. He was Champion sire four times and three times second. He sired the Classic winners Blue Peter, Watling Street, Pay Up, Kingsway, Garden Path and Tide-way. His most influential son however, was the Champion sire Fair Trial.

From 1946 Fairway suffered from hindquarters problems and was retired as a breeding stallion. He died in November 1948.

== Pedigree ==
Pedigree of Fairway (GB), brown stallion, 1925
Sire Phalaris (GB) 1913	Polymelus; 1902	Cyllene	Bona Vista
Sire Phalaris (GB) 1913	Polymelus; 1902	Cyllene	Arcadia
Sire Phalaris (GB) 1913	Polymelus; 1902	Maid Marian	Hampton
Sire Phalaris (GB) 1913	Polymelus; 1902	Maid Marian	Quiver
Sire Phalaris (GB) 1913	Bromus; 1905	Sainfoin	Springfield
Sire Phalaris (GB) 1913	Bromus; 1905	Sainfoin	Sanda
Sire Phalaris (GB) 1913	Bromus; 1905	Cheery	St Simon*
Sire Phalaris (GB) 1913	Bromus; 1905	Cheery	Sunrise
Dam Scapa Flow (GB) 1914	Chaucer; 1900	St Simon*	Galopin
Dam Scapa Flow (GB) 1914	Chaucer; 1900	St Simon*	St Angela
Dam Scapa Flow (GB) 1914	Chaucer; 1900	Canterbury Pilgrim	Tristan
Dam Scapa Flow (GB) 1914	Chaucer; 1900	Canterbury Pilgrim	Pilgrimage
Dam Scapa Flow (GB) 1914	Anchora; 1905	Love Wisely	Wisdom
Dam Scapa Flow (GB) 1914	Anchora; 1905	Love Wisely	Lovelorn
Dam Scapa Flow (GB) 1914	Anchora; 1905	Eryholme	Hazlehatch
Dam Scapa Flow (GB) 1914	Anchora; 1905	Eryholme	Ayrsmoss(Family: 13-e)

- Fairway was inbred 3 × 4 to St. Simon. This means that the stallion appears in both the third and fourth generations of his pedigree.
