= Pharamond (horse) =

British-bred Thoroughbred racehorse

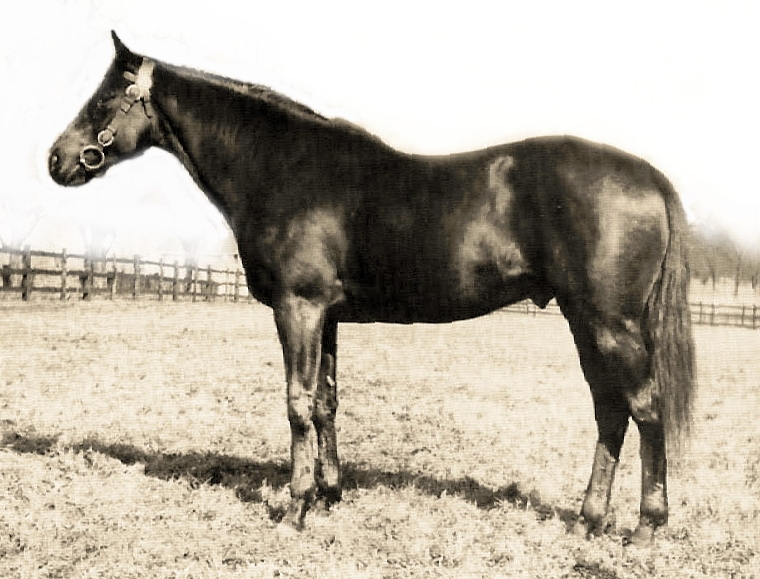
- Sire: Phalaris
- Grandsire: Polymelus
- Dam: Selene
- Damsire: Chaucer
- Sex: Stallion
- Foaled: 1 January 1925
- Country: England
- Colour: Brown
- Breeder: Edward Stanley, 17th Earl of Derby
- Owner: 1) 17th Earl of Derby; 2) Hal Price Headley
- Trainer: George Lambton; Frank Butters
- Record: 11: 2-2-1
- Earnings: £3,695

Major wins
- Middle Park Stakes (1927); Ellesmere Stakes (1928)
- Last updated on 26 September 2011

Pharamond (1925–1952) was an English Thoroughbred racehorse who became a successful sire of Champions in the United States where he was registered as Pharamond II. He was a full brother to Sickle, who also stood at stud successfully in the United States.

Pharamond was bred and raced by Edward Stanley, 17th Earl of Derby. His sire was Phalaris, twice the Leading sire in Great Britain and Ireland and a three-time Leading broodmare sire in Great Britain & Ireland. His dam was Selene who also produced the Argentine and leading Brazilian sire Hunter's Moon and Hyperion, the 1933 Epsom Derby and St. Leger Stakes winner and a six-time Leading sire in Great Britain and Ireland as well as a four-time Leading broodmare sire in Great Britain and Ireland.

== Racing career ==
Pharamond was raced by Lord Derby and trained by George Lambton. The colt met with some success on the turf, winning the 1927 Middle Park Stakes at Newmarket Racecourse and under new trainer Frank Butters, the 1928 Ellesmere Stakes at Ascot Racecourse. He also finished fourth to Flamingo in the 2000 Guineas.

== Stud record ==
Retired to stud in 1928, Pharamond was low on the list of Lord Derby's stable of stallions and he was put up for sale and was purchased for £4,000 by a group of American breeders led by Hal Price Headley who brought him to stand at his Beaumont Farm in Lexington, Kentucky in time for the 1929 season.

Pharamond's first crop commenced racing in 1932 and showed little promise. As a result, the syndicate was dissolved with Hal Price Headley acquiring one hundred percent ownership for US$7,500. Pharamond went on to sire thirty-five stakes winners from 399 foals of which three were champions and multiple stakes winners such as Athenia (1943), Creole Maid (1935), Cosmic Bomb (1944, sire), High Glee (1931), King Cole (1938, won Withers Stakes), Lithe (1946), and Whopper (1932). Pharamond's first Champion was Apogee (1932), the 1934 American Champion Two-Year-Old Filly, followed by Menow (1935, won Withers Stakes, 1937 American Champion Two-Year-Old Colt) as did By Jimminy in 1944. As well, Pharamond was the damsire of Kiss Me Kate, the 1951 American Champion Three-Year-Old Filly.

Pharamond's lasting influence is through Menow who sired two Horses of the Year, Capot and Hall of Fame inductee Tom Fool who in turn sired Hall of Famer Buckpasser, the Leading broodmare sire in North America four times.

Pharamond died in 1952 and was buried in the Beaumont Farm equine cemetery in an unmarked grave.

== Pedigree ==
Pedigree of Pharamond II (GB), brown stallion, 1925
Sire Phalaris 1913	Polymelus; 1902	Cyllene	Bona Vista
Sire Phalaris 1913	Polymelus; 1902	Cyllene	Arcadia
Sire Phalaris 1913	Polymelus; 1902	Maid Marian	Hampton
Sire Phalaris 1913	Polymelus; 1902	Maid Marian	Quiver
Sire Phalaris 1913	Bromus; 1905	Sainfoin	Springfield
Sire Phalaris 1913	Bromus; 1905	Sainfoin	Sanda
Sire Phalaris 1913	Bromus; 1905	Cheery	St. Simon
Sire Phalaris 1913	Bromus; 1905	Cheery	Sunrise
Dam Selene 1919	Chaucer; 1900	St. Simon	Galopin
Dam Selene 1919	Chaucer; 1900	St. Simon	St. Angela
Dam Selene 1919	Chaucer; 1900	Canterbury Pilgrim	Tristan
Dam Selene 1919	Chaucer; 1900	Canterbury Pilgrim	Pilgrimage
Dam Selene 1919	Serenissima; 1913	Minoru (IRE)	Cyllene
Dam Selene 1919	Serenissima; 1913	Minoru (IRE)	Mother Siegel
Dam Selene 1919	Serenissima; 1913	Gondolette	Loved One
Dam Selene 1919	Serenissima; 1913	Gondolette	Dongola (family: 6-e)
