= Phalaris (horse) =

British-bred Thoroughbred racehorse

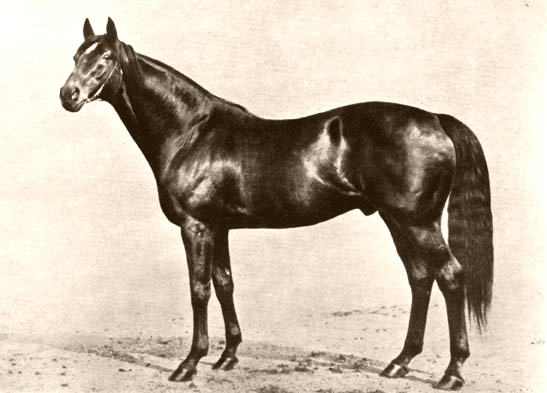
- Sire: Polymelus
- Grandsire: Cyllene
- Dam: Bromus
- Damsire: Sainfoin
- Sex: Stallion
- Foaled: 16 May 1913
- Died: 28 February 1931 (aged 17)
- Country: United Kingdom
- Colour: Brown
- Breeder: 17th Earl of Derby
- Owner: 17th Earl of Derby
- Trainer: George Lambton
- Record: 24: 16–2–1
- Earnings: £5,478

Major wins
- Challenge Stakes (1917, 1918)

Awards
- Leading sire in Great Britain and Ireland (1925, 1928); Leading broodmare sire in Great Britain & Ireland (1937, 1941, 1942)
- Last updated on 24 September 2011

Phalaris (16 May 1913 – 28 February 1931) was a British-bred Thoroughbred racehorse, later a Leading sire in Great Britain and Ireland and a Leading broodmare sire in Great Britain & Ireland. He appears in the sireline (stallion to stallion) of all racehorses which were winners of more than $10 million, as well as all yearlings that were auctioned for more than $7.5 million.

== Background ==
Phalaris was sired by the Champion Stakes winner Polymelus out of Bromus by the Epsom Derby winner Sainfoin, she being closely inbred in the second and third removes to Springfield. Bromus also foaled Hainault by Swynford. Phalaris was from a long line of successful sires. The conformation of Phalaris was typical of a sprinter, upstanding in build, but he was slightly back at the knee.

== Racing career ==
At the age of two years he was rated 9 lbs (4 kg) below the champion filly Fifinella. At three years he was not up to the Classic standard at a mile but he did win over 10 furlongs (2,000 metres). At four and five years old he was a very good sprinter, able to carry more than 10 stone (63.5 kilograms) and win on three occasions. Phalaris only raced at Newmarket where he won 16 of his 24 starts and was placed on another three occasions. He was the winner of the Stud Produce Stakes; Redmere Nursery Stakes; Beaufort Stakes; St. George Stakes; Royal Stakes; Bretby Handicap; Chesterfield Stakes; St. Ives Handicap; Bury St. Edmunds Plate; Snailwell Stakes; Challenge Stakes (twice); The Whip; Abingdon Plate; June Stakes and Lanwades Plate. Phalaris was the top sprinter in 1917 and 1918 when racing was restricted due to World War I. Phalaris was kept in training for four seasons, and was retired to Lord Derby's stud.

== Stud record ==
Phalaris was one of the most influential sires to serve Lord Derby's interests, and he had a major influence on modern Thoroughbred pedigrees. He is today the most influential patriarch of the Bend Or dynasty and by some accounts the world's most influential sire of the 20th century. Nearly all runners in the main races of the leading racing nations are now from the Phalaris sire-line. He appears in the dominantly male lineage of all nine horses that have earned more than $10 million. Currently, his sire line is most influential through the Northern Dancer line (more broadly Nearco) and the Mr. Prospector line.

He was the Leading sire in Great Britain and Ireland in 1925, 1928, once second and third and was the Leading broodmare sire in Great Britain & Ireland in 1937, 1941 and 1942.

Among his notable progeny, Phalaris sired five Classic race winners plus the following horses:

Foaled	Name	Sex	Major Wins/Achievements
1920	Knockando	Stallion	
1920	Pharos	Stallion	Champion Stakes, Leading sire in Great Britain and Ireland, Leading sire in France
1922	Manna	Stallion	2000 Guineas Stakes, Epsom Derby
1922	Phalaros	Stallion	July Cup
1922	Warden Of The Marches	Stallion	Champion Stakes
1923	Colorado	Stallion	2000 Guineas Stakes, Eclipse Stakes
1923	Phaona	Mare	
1924	Sickle	Stallion	Leading sire in North America (1936, 1938)
1925	Fairway	Stallion	St Leger Stakes, Leading sire in Great Britain and Ireland (4 times)
1925	Pharamond	Stallion	
1925	Plantago	Stallion	Coronation Cup
1926	Le Phare	Stallion	Sussex Stakes
1927	Caerleon	Stallion	Eclipse Stakes
1927	Christopher Robin	Stallion	St James's Palace Stakes
1927	Fair Isle	Mare	1000 Guineas Stakes (1930)
1929	Village Green	Mare	
1930	Chatelaine	Mare	Epsom Oaks (1933)
1931	Carpet Slipper	Mare	

Phalaris’ major tail-male descendants in the USA include, Native Dancer, Raise a Native, Mr. Prospector, Bold Ruler, Secretariat, Easy Goer Affirmed, Alydar, Seattle Slew, Hail To Reason, Halo, Sunday Silence, American Pharoah, Justify, Golden Tempo, and of course the great Northern Dancer, among many others. His tail-male line British descendants, or those that raced in Britain or Ireland, include such champions as Arkle (steeplechaser), Blue Peter, Fair Trial, Nasrullah, Royal Palace, Nijinsky, Sir Ivor, Roberto, Brigadier Gerard, Mill Reef, Shergar, Troy, Grundy, Sadler's Wells (horse), Galileo, Danzig (horse), Danehill (horse), Sea Bird II, Sea the Stars, High Chaparral and Frankel. Nearco, a son of Pharos who was sire of Nasrullah and grandsire of Northern Dancer, raced in Italy and France.

Phalaris dropped dead after covering a mare on 28 February 1931 at the age of 17 years.

== Pedigree ==
Pedigree of Phalaris (GB), brown stallion, 1913
Sire Polymelus 1902	Cyllene; 1895	Bona Vista	Bend Or
Sire Polymelus 1902	Cyllene; 1895	Bona Vista	Vista
Sire Polymelus 1902	Cyllene; 1895	Arcadia	Isonomy
Sire Polymelus 1902	Cyllene; 1895	Arcadia	Distant Shore
Sire Polymelus 1902	Maid Marian; 1886	Hampton	Lord Clifden
Sire Polymelus 1902	Maid Marian; 1886	Hampton	Lady Langden
Sire Polymelus 1902	Maid Marian; 1886	Quiver	Toxophilite
Sire Polymelus 1902	Maid Marian; 1886	Quiver	Young Melbourne Mare
Dam Bromus 1905	Sainfoin; 1887	Springfield	St.Albans
Dam Bromus 1905	Sainfoin; 1887	Springfield	Viridis
Dam Bromus 1905	Sainfoin; 1887	Sanda	Wenlock
Dam Bromus 1905	Sainfoin; 1887	Sanda	Sandal
Dam Bromus 1905	Cheery; 1892	St. Simon	Galopin
Dam Bromus 1905	Cheery; 1892	St. Simon	St. Angela
Dam Bromus 1905	Cheery; 1892	Sunrise	Springfield
Dam Bromus 1905	Cheery; 1892	Sunrise	Sunray (Family 1-i)

== See also ==
- List of leading Thoroughbred racehorses
