= Canterbury Pilgrim =

British Thoroughbred racehorse

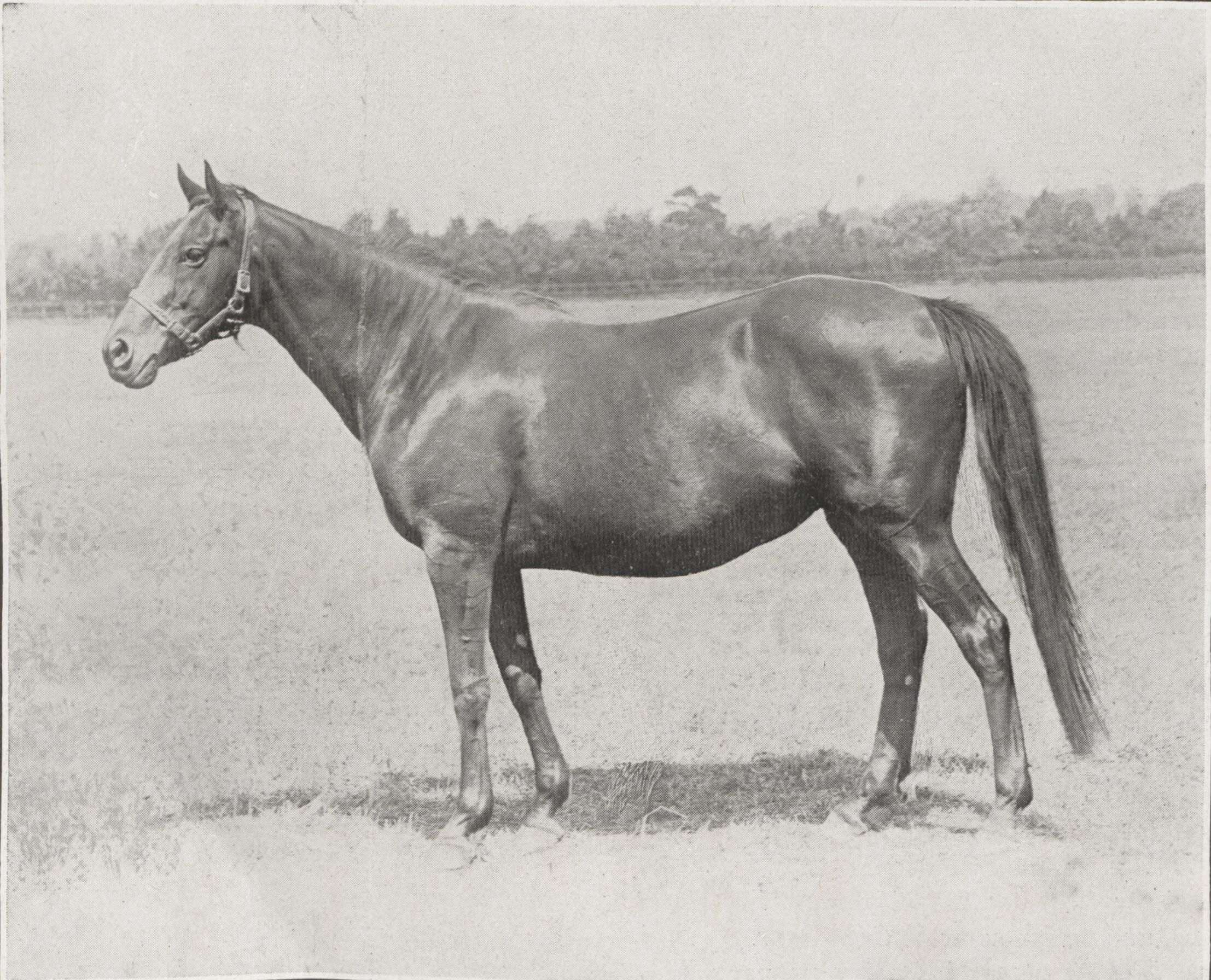
- Le Sport universel illustré, 28 April 1922
- Sire: Tristan
- Grandsire: Hermit
- Dam: Pilgrimage
- Damsire: The Earl or The Palmer
- Sex: Mare
- Foaled: 1893
- Country: United Kingdom
- Colour: Chestnut
- Breeder: Caroline, Duchess of Montrose
- Owner: Frederick Stanley, 16th Earl of Derby
- Trainer: George Lambton
- Record: 10: 4-0-1

Major wins
- Oaks Stakes (1896); Liverpool Summer Cup (1896); Park Hill Stakes (1896); Jockey Club Cup (1896)

Canterbury Pilgrim (1893–1917) was a British Thoroughbred racehorse and broodmare. She showed some ability as a juvenile but failed to win a race. She won the Oaks Stakes on her first run as a three-year-old and went on to win the Liverpool Summer Cup, Park Hill Stakes and Jockey Club Cup before being retired at the end of the year. As a broodmare the best of her offspring was Swynford, a top-class racehorse who was even better as a breeding stallion. She also produced the influential sire Chaucer and several good broodmares. She has been described as "one of the most influential horses, stallion or mare, of the Twentieth Century".

== Background ==
Canterbury Pilgrim was a chestnut mare bred in at the Sefton Stud in Newmarket, Suffolk by Caroline, Duchess of Montrose, the widow of James Graham, 4th Duke of Montrose. When the Duchess died in 1894, the yearling filly was put up for sale in July and bought for 1,800 guineas by Frederick Stanley, 16th Earl of Derby. She was trained throughout her racing career by George Lambton at Bedford Lodge stables in Newmarket, Suffolk.

She was one of the best horses sired by Tristan, a brilliant and durable but highly temperamental performer whose wins included the July Cup, Ascot Gold Cup and three editions of the Champion Stakes. Her dam Pilgrimage was a top-class performer who completed a rare double when winning both the 1000 Guineas and 2000 Guineas in 1878. As a broodmare he produced several other good winners including the Epsom Derby winner Jeddah.

== Racing career ==
=== 1895: two-year-old season ===
Canterbury Pilgrim contested four events as a two-year-old in 1894 but failed to win a race. When tried against top-class opposition on her debut in the Champagne Stakes at Doncaster Racecourse on 10 September she came home last of the seven runners behind the Duke of Westminster's filly Omladina. She also finished last of four behind Gulistan, Attainment and Queen's Piper in the Prendergast Stakes at Newmarket Racecourse on 10 October. Her only effort came at Liverpool in early November when she finished third to Arctic in the Knowsley Nursery (a handicap race for juveniles) carrying a weight of 104 pounds. On her final run of the year she ran unplaced under 105 pounds in the Chesterfield Nursery Stakes over five furlongs on 14 November at Derby Racecourse.

=== 1896: three-year-old season ===
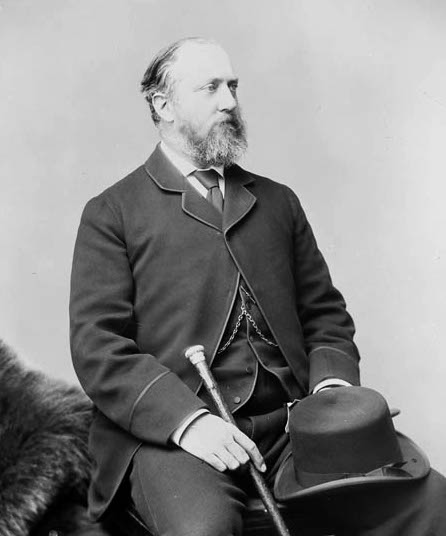
Canterbury Pilgrim's owner the 16th Earl of Derby

Canterbury Pilgrim began her second season in the 118th running of the Oaks Stakes over one and a half miles at Epsom Racecourse on 5 June. Ridden by Fred Rickaby she was made the 100/8 fifth choice in the eleven-runner field with the Prince of Wales's 1000 Guineas winner Thais starting the 13/8 favourite. After tracking the leaders for most of the way she moved into second place behind Thais in the straight and then moved alongside the favourite entering the final furlong after a brief struggle she broke clear and won by two lengths from Thais, with Proposition a length away in third.

The filly was then dropped back in distance for the Coronation Stakes over one mile at Royal Ascot twelve days later but despite starting 7/4 favourite she came home fourth behind Helm, Thais and Miss Fraser, all of whom had finished behind her at Epsom. Canterbury Pilgrim was matched against older horses in the Liverpool Summer Cup over eleven furlongs on 23 July and was assigned a weight of 103 pounds. Ridden by Tommy Loates she won "very cleverly" by a length from the nine-year-old Australian gelding Paris III.

Canterbury Pilgrim faced Helm again Park Hill Stakes over one and three quarter miles on the last day of the St Leger meeting at the Doncaster. Starting the 10/11 favourite she went to the front entering the final furlong and "forged ahead" to win by two lengths from Jolly Boat with Helm unplaced. On 28 October, carrying a weight of 113 pounds, the filly finished unplaced behind Winkfield's Pride in the Cambridgeshire Handicap over nine furlongs at Newmarket. One day later at the same track she started at odds of 20/21 for the Jockey Club Cup over two and a quarter miles and won "very easily" from the colt Gulistan.

== Breeding record ==
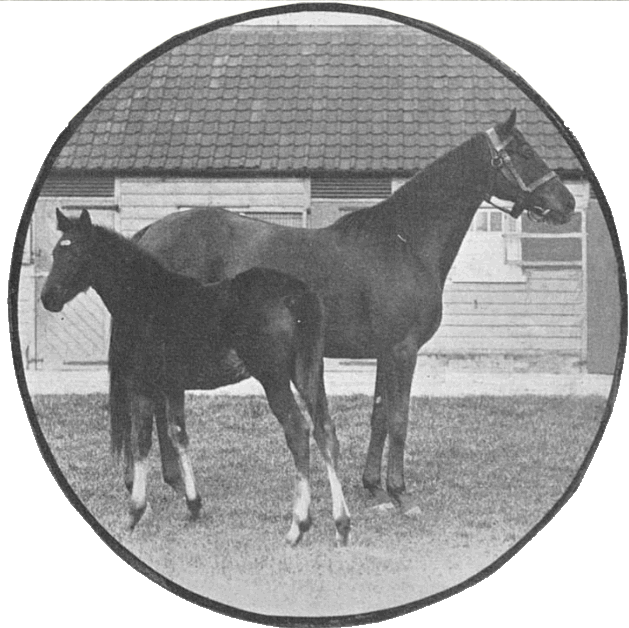
Canterbury Pilgrim with her 1898 foal, St. Victorine.

Canterbury Pilgrim was retired from racing at the end of 1896 to become a broodmare for Lord Derby's stud. On Lord Derby's death in 1896 the mare passed into the ownership of his son the 17th Earl. She produced ten foals between 1898 and 1914:

- St Victorine, a brown filly, foaled in 1898, sired by St Serf. Female-line ancestor of Star Kingdom.
- Chaucer, brown colt, 1900, by St Simon. Won eight races. Sire of Canyon and Pillion. Leading sire of broodmares.
- Gourd, brown filly, 1902, by Persimmon
- Glasconbury, chestnut filly, 1903, by Isinglass
- Wife of Bath, brown filly, 1904, by St Simon. Female-line ancestor of Mon Fils and Saoire.
- Pilgrim's Way, chestnut filly, 1905, by St Frusquin. Female-line ancestor of Right Boy, Rain Lover and Kyllachy.
- Swynford, brown colt, 1907, by John O'Gaunt. Won St Leger and Eclipse Stakes. Champion sire in 1923.
- The Tabard, chestnut filly, 1908, by Zinfandel
- Harry of Hereford, bay colt, 1910, by John O'Gaunt
- Nun's Veiling, brown filly, 1914, by Roquelaure

Canterbury Pilgrim died in 1917, at the age of 24.

== Pedigree ==
Pedigree of Canterbury Pilgrim (GB), chestnut mare, 1893
Sire Tristan (GB) 1878	Hermit; 1864	Newminster	Touchstone*
Sire Tristan (GB) 1878	Hermit; 1864	Newminster	Beeswing
Sire Tristan (GB) 1878	Hermit; 1864	Seclusion	Tadmor
Sire Tristan (GB) 1878	Hermit; 1864	Seclusion	Miss Sellon*
Sire Tristan (GB) 1878	Thrift; 1865	Stockwell	The Baron (IRE)
Sire Tristan (GB) 1878	Thrift; 1865	Stockwell	Pocahontas
Sire Tristan (GB) 1878	Thrift; 1865	Braxey	Moss Trooper
Sire Tristan (GB) 1878	Thrift; 1865	Braxey	Queen Mary
Dam Pilgrimage (GB) 1875	The Palmer; 1864	Beadsman	Weatherbit
Dam Pilgrimage (GB) 1875	The Palmer; 1864	Beadsman	Mendicant*
Dam Pilgrimage (GB) 1875	The Palmer; 1864	Madame Eglentine	Cowl*
Dam Pilgrimage (GB) 1875	The Palmer; 1864	Madame Eglentine	Diversion
Dam Pilgrimage (GB) 1875	Lady Audley; 1867	Macaroni	Sweetmeat
Dam Pilgrimage (GB) 1875	Lady Audley; 1867	Macaroni	Jocose
Dam Pilgrimage (GB) 1875	Lady Audley; 1867	Secret	Melbourne
Dam Pilgrimage (GB) 1875	Lady Audley; 1867	Secret	Mystery (Family: 1-g)

* Canterbury Pilgrim is inbred 4S x 5D to the stallion Touchstone, meaning that he appears fourth generation on the sire side of her pedigree, and fifth generation (via Mendicant) on the dam side of her pedigree.

* Canterbury Pilgrim is inbred 5S x 4D to the stallion Cowl, meaning that he appears fifth generation (via Miss Sellon) on the sire side of her pedigree, and fourth generation on the dam side of her pedigree.
