= George Lambton =

British horse trainer (1860–1945)

The Honourable George Lambton
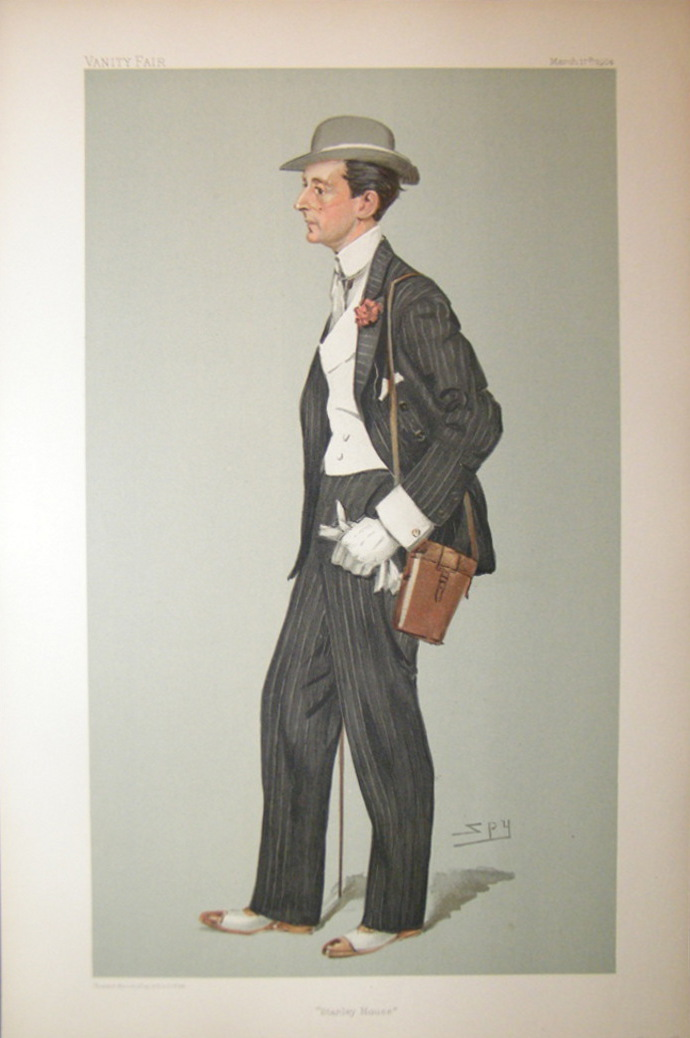
- Vanity Fair caricature of Lambton (1904)

Personal information
- Born: 1860 United Kingdom
- Died: 1945 (aged 84–85)
- Occupation: Trainer

Horse racing career
- Sport: Horse racing

Major racing wins
- British Classic Race wins as trainer: 2000 Guineas (1); 1000 Guineas (4); Epsom Derby (2); Epsom Oaks (2); St Leger (3)

Racing awards
- British flat racing Champion Trainer (1906, 1911, 1912)

Significant horses
- Swynford, Sansovino, Colorado, Hyperion

George Lambton (23 November 1860 – 23 July 1945) was a British thoroughbred racehorse trainer. He was British flat racing Champion Trainer in the 1906, 1911 and 1912 seasons.

== Early life ==
The Honourable George Lambton was born in London on 23 November 1860, the fifth son of George Lambton, 2nd Earl of Durham and his wife, Beatrix, daughter of James Hamilton, 1st Duke of Abercorn. He was educated at Winchester, Brighton and Eton, and admitted to Trinity College, Cambridge on 11 June 1879. His entry in Alumni Cantabrigienses states "At Eton he was rather too near Ascot, and at Cambridge rather too near Newmarket." He became a second lieutenant in the 2nd Derbyshire Militia in 1880, then a lieutenant in the 3rd Battalion Sherwood Foresters.

== Horse racing ==
As an amateur jockey he won the Grand Steeple-Chase de Paris on Parasang in 1888. After a fall at Sandown Park Racecourse in 1892 he decided to take up training and in 1893 he was appointed trainer to the 16th Earl of Derby at Bedford Lodge stables in Newmarket, Suffolk. He trained Canterbury Pilgrim to win the 1896 Epsom Oaks for Lord Derby and the 1906 Epsom Oaks with Keystone II.

Lord Derby died in 1908 and was succeeded by his son, the 17th Earl of Derby. George Lambton trained the winners of ten British Classic Races for the Earl including The Derby with Sansovino in 1924 and Hyperion in 1933. He also trained the 1000 Guineas winner Diadem for Lord d'Abernon in 1917.

In 1926 Lambton was replaced by Frank Butters as Lord Derby's trainer but remained as his racing manager and resumed training for the Earl in 1931. In 1933 however he was finally replaced by Colledge Leader. He became a public trainer and remained one until his retirement in 1945, dying a few days later on 23 July.

Lambton was the author of Men and Horses I Have Known. He lived at Mesnil Warren (a house extended for him by Sir Edwin Lutyens in 1925), Newmarket. George Lambton Avenue and George Lambton Playing Fields, both in the town, are named after him.

== Family ==
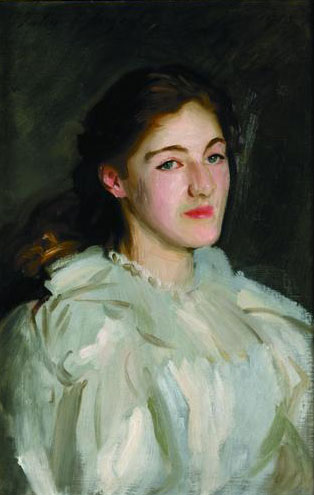
Cicely Horner (later Mrs. George Lambton), John Singer Sargent, c. 1889

Lambton married Cicely Margaret Horner (daughter of Sir John Horner and maternal granddaughter of Scottish politician William Graham) on 7 December 1908 in London. They had four children:

- Flying Officer (Air Gunner) John Lambton (31 July 1909 – 11 August 1941), Royal Air Force officer, killed in action during World War II.
- Ann Katharine Swynford Lambton (8 February 1912 – 19 July 2008), historian of Persian studies.
- Captain Edward "Teddy" George Lambton (29 April 1918 – 23 June 1983), British Army officer and racehorse trainer.
- Sybil Frances Mary Diadem Lambton (7 October 1919 – 22 April 1961), married Major William Jessop. Died from a fall in a point-to-point.

His two daughters' middle names of Swynford and Diadem, were taken from the names of the winners of the 1910 St. Leger Stakes and the 1917 1,000 Guineas Stakes, respectively.

== British Classic Race wins ==
- 1,000 Guineas – (4) – Canyon (1916), Diadem (1917), Ferry (1918), Tranquil (1923)
- 2,000 Guineas – (1) – Colorado (1926)
- Oaks – (2) – Canterbury Pilgrim (1896), Keystone II (1906)
- Derby – (2) – Sansovino (1924), Hyperion (1933)
- St. Leger – (4) – Swynford (1910), Keysoe (1919), Tranquil (1923), Hyperion (1933)
