= Pilgrimage (horse) =

British Thoroughbred racehorse

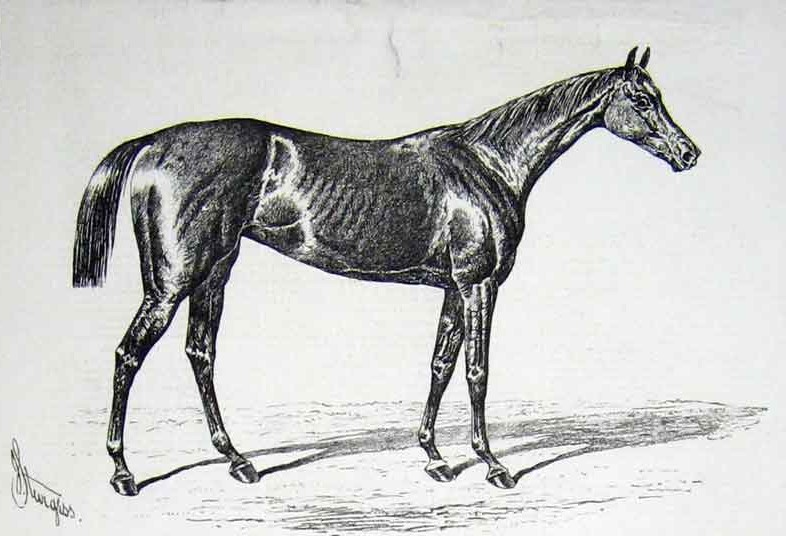
- 1878 print of Pilgrimage
- Sire: The Palmer or The Earl
- Grandsire: Beadsman
- Dam: Promise
- Damsire: Macaroni
- Sex: Mare
- Foaled: 1875
- Country: Great Britain
- Colour: Chestnut
- Breeder: Mr. Cookson
- Owner: 4th Earl of Lonsdale
- Record: 8: 6-1-1

Major wins
- Dewhurst Plate (1877); Post Sweepstakes (1877); 2000 Guineas Stakes (1878); 1000 Guineas Stakes (1878)

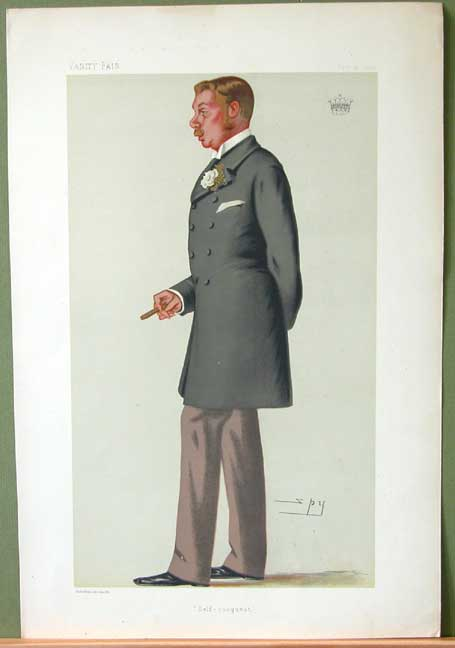
Pilgrimage's owner the 4th Earl of Lonsdale

Pilgrimage (1875–1897) was a British Thoroughbred racehorse. As a two-year-old she was only defeated once and won the Dewhurst Plate. She only raced three times as a three-year-old, winning the 2000 Guineas and 1000 Guineas, before finishing as the runner-up in the Oaks Stakes. After retiring from racing she became a successful broodmare, foaling Oaks winner Canterbury Pilgrim and Derby winner Jeddah.

== Background ==
Pilgrimage was a chestnut filly bred by Mr. Cookson foaled in 1875. She was sired by either The Palmer or The Earl, who were both Ascot Derby winners. Some sources list both stallions, while some only list The Palmer. Pilgrimage's dam was Promise, a daughter of Epsom Derby winner Macaroni. St George Lowther, 4th Earl of Lonsdale, paid 190 guineas for Pilgrimage in 1877.

== Racing career ==
=== 1877: two-year-old season ===
Pilgrimage made her racecourse début on 28 September 1877 in the First October Two-year-old Stakes over half a mile at Newmarket. She started the race as the 9/2 second favourite and immediately went to the front. In the closing stages she extended her lead and won easily by eight lengths from Dalgarno, who had started as the even money favourite. Ten days later Pilgrimage started as the odds-on favourite for a Plate for two-year-olds. Facing only three opponents, she won by a length from Queen of Pearls.

She then stepped in in class to contest the Middle Park Plate along with 19 other horses. Athol Lad started the race as the 7/4 favourite, with Beauclerc next at 5/1. Pilgrimage was one of the outsiders of the field, priced at 25/1. In the early stages Wild Darrell led the field and Pilgrimage was not amongst the front runners. As they entered the final quarter of the race Wild Darrell was fading, while Pilgrimage had made some progress through the pack. In the final furlong the race was between the Katie colt and Beauclerc, with the latter holding on to win by one length. Pilgrimage finished in third place, three lengths behind the runner-up.

There were nine runners in the Dewhurst Plate on 25 October. Childeric was the 10/3 favourite, with Nerina at 4/1, Pilgrimage at 9/2 and Athol Lad at 5/1. The French colt Insulaire initially led the race, with Pilgrimage in about third position. In the closing stages Pilgrimage overtook Insulaire to win by half a length. Inval was third, two lengths behind the runner-up. The following day Pilgrimage faced three rivals in the Post Sweepstakes and started as the favourite. Tredegar was beaten after half a mile, but the other three raced until the finish line. Pilgrimage won by a neck from Redwing, who in turn beat third-placed Clementine by a head.

=== 1878: three-year-old season ===
On 8 May 1878 Pilgrimage was one of ten horses to line up for the 2000 Guineas Stakes over one mile at Newmarket. There had been a lot of rain at Newmarket, which made the ground very heavy. Ridden by Tom Cannon, she was sent off as the 2/1 favourite. Insulaire and Childeric were also fancied and were priced at 9/4 and 9/2 respectively. At the start of the race Inval went to the front, but he was soon pulled back and Sefton look up the running on the right hand side of the course, followed by Oasis and Bayonet. Glengarry and Childeric were just behind Sefton and racing down the centre of the course and Inval was leading the group on the stand side. As they moved into the second half of the race Pilgrimage had made progress through the field into third place, behind Sefton and Insulaire. Sefton then began to struggle and Insulaire took over the lead, with Pilgrimage just half a length behind. She then closed on Insulaire and strode past to win by half a length. Sefton was third, a length and a half behind Insulaire. Childeric finished in fourth place, a further four lengths back and he was clear of Oasis and the rest of the field. Third placed Sefton went on to win the Derby at Epsom Downs a few weeks later.

Two days after her victory in the 2000 Guineas, Pilgrimage started the 1000 Guineas as the 4/5 favourite. She was again ridden by Cannon and her nearest rivals in the market were Clementine at 5/1 and Strathfleet at 6/1. Unlike in the 2000 Guineas, Pilgrimage was near the front in the early stages, running just behind leading Blue Ridge. As they entered the second half of the race Pilgrimage took the lead from Blue Ridge and was followed by Clementine and Jannette. Strathfleet and Bel Ange closed on the leading trio, but soon faded again. As the three leaders climbed the hill towards the finish Clementine started to struggle and was overtaken by Jannette. Jannette then went after Pilgrimage, but Pilgrimage held her off to win by three quarters of a length. Clementine was a further two lengths back in third place, with Bel Ange leading the remainder of the fillies home, several lengths behind Clementine.

It had been raining at Epsom Downs the night before the Oaks Stakes, but it cleared up during the day. The race was seen as a match between Pilgrimage and Jannette and this was reflected in the betting. Pilgrimage was the even money favourite, with Janette at 10/6. The nearest opponents were Clementine and Eau de Vie, both at 100/8, with the rest of the eight-runner field priced at 50/1. The filly by Lord Clifen led the field in the early stages, with Cannon positioning Pilgrimage at the rear. After about half a mile Pilgrimage moved up into third place, just behind Jannette. As they approached the turn into the finishing straight Jannette took the lead and was followed by Clementine. Pilgrimage took second place with two furlongs left to run, but could not catch Jannette, who won by a length. Clementine finished third, a long way behind Jannette and Pilgrimage.

== Stud career ==
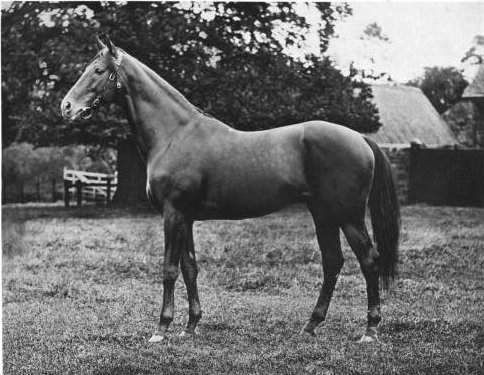
Pilgrimage's son Jeddah

After retiring from racing Pilgrimage went on to become a successful broodmare, foaling two Classic winners. Pilgrimage died in 1897. Her progeny included:

- Slipped Foal to Hermit in 1880
- a dead colt foaled in 1881 and sired by Hermit.
- a bay mare foaled in 1882 by Sterling.
- Loved One – a brown colt foaled in 1883 and sired by See Saw. In 1885 he won the Foal Post Stakes and finished third in the Clearwell Stakes at Newmarket.
- Lourdes – a colt foaled in 1884 and sired by Sefton, who won the Clearwell Stakes in 1886.
- Barren to Isonomy in 1885
- Knight of Malta - a bay colt foaled in 1886 and sired by Galopin.
- Shrine – a chestnut mare foaled in 1887 and sired by Clairvaux or Isonomy. She won the Chesterfield Cup Handicap at Goodwood in 1891 and the Liverpool Spring Cup in 1894. Shrine was the dam of Prix du Jockey Club winner Saxon,
- Barren to Isonomy in 1888
- Pilgrim's Progress – a chestnut colt foaled in 1889 and sired by Isonomy who was runner-up in the Woodcote Stakes at Epsom in 1891. He was exported to Australia, where he became Champion sire.
- Barren to Clairvaux in 1890
- Mecca – a chestnut filly foaled in 1891 and sired by Isonomy. She won the Hopeful Stakes in 1893 and finished third in the 1000 Guineas in 1894.
- a dead colt foaled in 1892 and sired by Isonomy.
- Canterbury Pilgrim – a chestnut mare foaled in 1893 and sired by Tristan. She won the Oaks Stakes, Liverpool Summer Cup, Park Hill Stakes and Jockey Club Cup. After retiring from racing she too went on to become a top broodmare, foaling the stallion Chaucer, Nassau Stakes winner Glasconbury and the St. Leger winner and Champion sire Swynford.
- Barren to Tristan in 1894
- Jeddah – a chestnut colt foaled in 1895 and sired by Janissary. He won the Derby and Prince of Wales Stakes in 1898.
- a chestnut colt foaled in 1896 and sired by Bend Or.
- Barren to Childwick in 1897

== Pedigree ==
Pedigree of Pilgrimage, chestnut mare, 1875
Sire The Palmer (GB; b. 1864)	Beadsman (br. 1855)	Weatherbit	Sheet Anchor
Sire The Palmer (GB; b. 1864)	Beadsman (br. 1855)	Weatherbit	Miss Letty
Sire The Palmer (GB; b. 1864)	Beadsman (br. 1855)	Mendicant	Touchstone
Sire The Palmer (GB; b. 1864)	Beadsman (br. 1855)	Mendicant	Lady Moore Carew
Sire The Palmer (GB; b. 1864)	Madame Eglentine (b. 1857)	Cowl	Bay Middleton
Sire The Palmer (GB; b. 1864)	Madame Eglentine (b. 1857)	Cowl	Crucifix
Sire The Palmer (GB; b. 1864)	Madame Eglentine (b. 1857)	Diversion	Defence
Sire The Palmer (GB; b. 1864)	Madame Eglentine (b. 1857)	Diversion	Folly
Dam Lady Audley (GB) br. 1867	Macaroni (GB) b. 1860	Sweetmeat b. 1842	Gladiator
Dam Lady Audley (GB) br. 1867	Macaroni (GB) b. 1860	Sweetmeat b. 1842	Lollypop
Dam Lady Audley (GB) br. 1867	Macaroni (GB) b. 1860	Jocose b. 1843	Pantaloon
Dam Lady Audley (GB) br. 1867	Macaroni (GB) b. 1860	Jocose b. 1843	Banter
Dam Lady Audley (GB) br. 1867	Secret (GB) b. 1853	Melbourne br. 1834	Humphrey Clinker
Dam Lady Audley (GB) br. 1867	Secret (GB) b. 1853	Melbourne br. 1834	Cervantes mare
Dam Lady Audley (GB) br. 1867	Secret (GB) b. 1853	Mystery; 1842	Jerry
Dam Lady Audley (GB) br. 1867	Secret (GB) b. 1853	Mystery; 1842	Nameless

Note: b. = Bay, br. = Brown
