= Edward Stanley, 17th Earl of Derby =

British politician (1865–1948)

The Right Honourable The Earl of Derby KG GCB GCVO TD PC JP
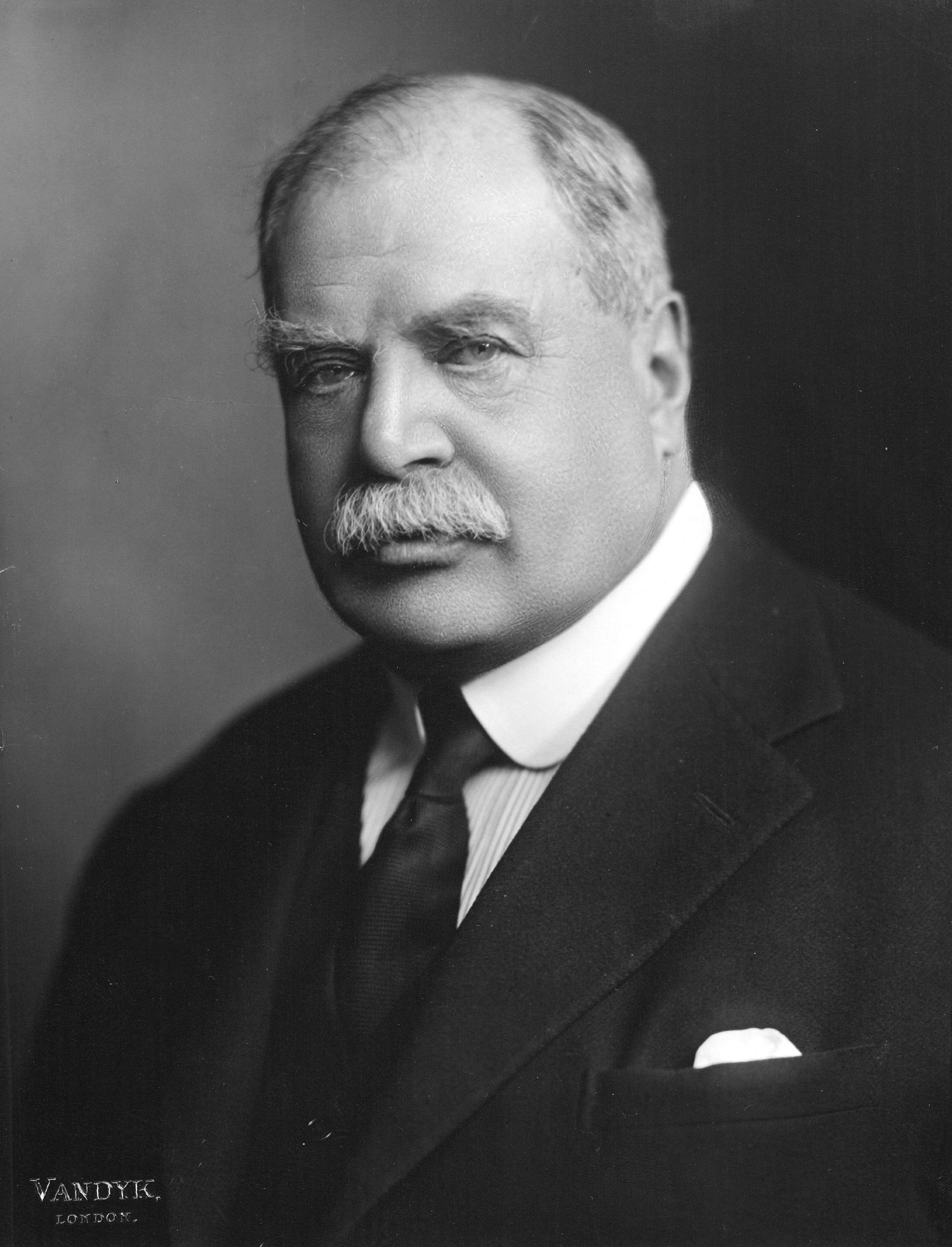
- Derby in 1937

Secretary of State for War
- In office 24 October 1922 – 22 January 1924
- Monarch: George V
- Prime Minister: Bonar Law; Stanley Baldwin
- Preceded by: Sir Laming Worthington-Evans, Bt
- Succeeded by: Stephen Walsh
- In office 10 December 1916 – 18 April 1918
- Monarch: George V
- Prime Minister: David Lloyd George
- Preceded by: David Lloyd George
- Succeeded by: The Viscount Milner

Ambassador to France
- In office 1918–1920
- Monarch: George V
- Preceded by: The Viscount Bertie of Thame
- Succeeded by: The Lord Hardinge of Penshurst

Parliamentary Under-Secretary of State for War
- In office 6 July 1916 – 10 December 1916
- Monarch: George V
- Prime Minister: H. H. Asquith
- Preceded by: Harold Tennant
- Succeeded by: Ian Macpherson

Postmaster General
- In office 6 October 1903 – 10 December 1905
- Monarch: Edward VII
- Prime Minister: Arthur Balfour
- Preceded by: Austen Chamberlain
- Succeeded by: Sydney Buxton

Financial Secretary to the War Office
- In office 7 November 1900 – 12 October 1903
- Monarchs: Victoria; Edward VII
- Prime Minister: The Marquess of Salisbury; Arthur Balfour
- Preceded by: Joseph Powell Williams
- Succeeded by: William Bromley-Davenport

Lord Commissioner of the Treasury
- In office 6 July 1895 – 7 November 1900
- Monarch: Victoria
- Prime Minister: The Marquess of Salisbury
- Preceded by: William Alexander McArthur
- Succeeded by: Ailwyn Fellowes

Member of the House of Lords Lord Temporal
- In office 15 June 1908 – 4 February 1948; Hereditary Peerage
- Preceded by: The 16th Earl of Derby
- Succeeded by: The 18th Earl of Derby

Member of Parliament for Westhoughton
- In office 26 July 1892 – 12 January 1906
- Preceded by: Frank Hardcastle
- Succeeded by: William Wilson

Personal details
- Born: Edward George Villiers Stanley; 8 April 1865 St James's Square, Westminster, London
- Died: 4 February 1948 (aged 82) Knowsley Hall, Lancashire
- Party: Conservative
- Spouse: Lady Alice Montagu (m. 1889–1948)
- Children: Edward Stanley, Lord Stanley; Hon. Oliver Stanley; Lady Victoria Bullock
- Parent(s): Frederick Stanley, 16th Earl of Derby; Lady Constance Villiers

Edward George Villiers Stanley, 17th Earl of Derby (4 April 1865 – 4 February 1948), styled The Hon. Edward Stanley from 1886 to 1893 and Lord Stanley from 1893 to 1908, was a British peer, soldier, Conservative politician, diplomat and racehorse owner. He was twice Secretary of State for War and also served as British Ambassador to France.

== Early life and education ==
Stanley was born at 23 St James's Square, London, the eldest son of Hon. Frederick Stanley (later the 16th Earl of Derby) by his wife, Lady Constance Villiers. Frederick Stanley was the second son of Edward Smith-Stanley, 14th Earl of Derby, who was three times Prime Minister of the United Kingdom. Villiers was the daughter of the Liberal statesman George Villiers, 4th Earl of Clarendon. Edward Stanley was educated at Wellington College, Berkshire, where he boarded as a pupil of Stanley House, named in honour of his paternal grandfather the 14th Earl.

== Military career ==
Stanley initially received a lieutenant's commission in a militia unit, the 3rd Battalion, King's Own Royal Regiment (Lancaster) (commanded by his father), on 4 May 1882, and then joined the Grenadier Guards as a lieutenant from 6 May 1885. He was seconded as aide-de-camp to the Governor General of Canada, his father, between 8 August 1889 and 1891. He was again seconded from his regiment on 10 July 1892, to take his seat in the House of Commons. He resigned his commission on 3 April 1895.

On 11 January 1899, he was commissioned a lieutenant in the reserve of officers, and on 17 May, was made honorary colonel of the 2nd Volunteer Battalion, Loyal North Lancashire Regiment. Lord Stanley served on the staff in the Second Boer War, and was appointed Chief Press Censor at Cape Town, graded as assistant adjutant-general, on 18 January 1900. He accompanied Lord Roberts's headquarters as Press Censor when he left Cape Town, and was mentioned in despatches of 31 March 1900 by Roberts for his "tact and discretion" in that role. He was appointed Roberts' private secretary on 25 July 1900. and was again mentioned in despatches of 2 April 1901 for his "thorough knowledge of men and affairs". He was appointed honorary colonel of the 6th (Militia) Battalion, Manchester Regiment on 24 December 1902, of the 5th Battalion, King's Regiment (Liverpool) in the Territorial Force (TF) on 15 June 1908 (the fourth successive Earl of Derby to hold the appointment), of the 4th and 5th TF Battalions of the Loyal North Lancashire Regiment on 18 June 1909 and 17 May 1899 respectively, and of the Lancashire and Cheshire Heavy Brigade, Royal Artillery on 26 February 1921.

== Political career ==
Derby entered Parliament for Westhoughton in 1892, and served under Lord Salisbury as a Lord of the Treasury between 1895 and 1900 and under Salisbury and later Arthur Balfour as Financial Secretary to the War Office between 1901 and 1903. In October 1903 he entered the cabinet as Postmaster General, a post he held until the government fell in December 1905. He lost his seat in the 1906 general election. In 1908 he succeeded his father in the earldom and took his seat in the House of Lords.

In August 1914, Lord Derby organised one of the most successful recruitment campaigns to Kitchener's Army in Liverpool. Over two days, 1,500 Liverpudlians joined the new battalion. Speaking to the men, he said: "This should be a battalion of pals, a battalion in which friends from the same office will fight shoulder to shoulder for the honour of Britain and the credit of Liverpool." Within the next few days, three more pals battalions were raised in Liverpool. In October 1915, as Director-General of Recruiting, he instituted the Derby Scheme, a halfway house between voluntary enlistment and conscription (which the Government was reluctant to adopt). It was not sufficiently successful in spite of the fact that the execution of Nurse Edith Cavell by the Germans on 12 October 1915 was used in recruitment rallies and conscription followed in 1916.

In July 1916 Derby returned to the government when he was appointed Under-Secretary of State for War by H. H. Asquith, and in December 1916 he was promoted to Secretary of State for War by David Lloyd George. In this position he was a strong supporter of the Chief of the Imperial General Staff Sir William Robertson and of the Commander-in-Chief of the BEF, Field Marshal Haig. Haig privately had little respect for him, writing to his wife (10 January 1918) that Derby was "like the feather pillow, bear[ing] the mark of the last person who sat on him" and remarking that he was known in London as the "genial Judas". Robertson's biographer writes that during the crisis over Robertson's removal Derby "made himself ridiculous" by asking everyone, including the King, whether or not he should resign, and then in the end not doing so, only to be removed from the War Office a few weeks later.

Derby and John Joseph Woodward (who was also secretary) jointly founded the ex-servicemen's organisation, the Comrades of the Great War in 1917 as a right-wing alternative to the National Association of Discharged Sailors and Soldiers (NADSS) and the National Federation of Discharged and Demobilized Sailors and Soldiers (NFDSS), the latter of whom had put a candidate up against his son Lord Stanley in the 1917 Liverpool Abercromby by-election. The rival groups later merged into the British Legion formed in 1921.

In April 1918 he was made Ambassador to France, which he remained until 1920. In April 1921 he was sent secretly to Ireland for talks with Éamon de Valera, and it is likely that these talks paved the way for the truce which in turn led to the Anglo-Irish Treaty. Clementine Churchill wrote of Derby to her husband Winston Churchill (3 February 1922) “People think he is bluff & independent & honest & John Bullish but he is really a fat sneak”.

He again served as Secretary of State for War under the Conservative governments of Bonar Law and Stanley Baldwin from 1922 to 1924.

== Honours and other public positions ==
Derby was made a CB in 1900, sworn of the Privy Council in 1903, KCVO in 1905 and a GCVO in 1908, Knight of the Garter in 1915, GCB in 1920. He was awarded the Freedom of the City of Manchester in 1934.

Derby was Lord Mayor of Liverpool between 1911 and 1912. He served as honorary president of the Rugby Football League, and donated a cup for the French authorities to use for a knock-out competition, much as his father had done for ice hockey with the Stanley Cup. This is now known as the Lord Derby Cup. Between 1937 and 1947 he was the president of the National Playing Fields Association (now renamed Fields in Trust). He was also, from 1929 to 1945, the chairman of the Pilgrims Society, becoming their president, until his death in 1948. Derby served as East Lancashire Provincial Grand Master of Freemasonry from 1899 until his death. He also held the post of Lord Lieutenant of Lancashire between 1928 and 1948. Another contribution made to English rugby league was the match between St Helens and Wigan being named 'the derby' as the clubs reside in opposite ends of Lord Derby's estate, this is a term used globally between rival clubs from a similar location however there is only one domestic league match named 'the Derby'.

== Horse racing ==
The Epsom Derby was named after the 12th Earl while The Oaks was named after the 12th Earl's house near Epsom. Derby followed the family tradition and was one of the most prominent owner breeders during the first half of the 20th century. Among his stables' important wins were:

- Epsom Derby (3): 1924, 1933, 1942
- Epsom Oaks (2): 1928, 1945
- St. Leger Stakes (6): 1910, 1919, 1923, 1928, 1933, 1943
- 1,000 Guineas (7): 1916, 1918, 1923, 1930, 1936, 1943, 1945
- 2,000 Guineas (2): 1926, 1944

Amidst increased publicity that included making the cover of Time, in 1930 the 17th Earl visited Louisville, Kentucky, with Joseph E. Widener where he was the honoured guest of Churchill Downs president Col. Matt Winn at the 56th running of the Kentucky Derby.

His biggest achievement, though, was his breeding of the horse Phalaris. A champion sprinter and a stallion par excellence, Phalaris was responsible for establishing the most dominant sire line in Europe and later, the United States through his four sons – Sickle, Pharamond, Pharos and Fairway.

== Marriage and issue ==
Lord Derby married Lady Alice Montagu, daughter of William Montagu, 7th Duke of Manchester, and Louisa von Alten, and step-daughter of the leading Liberal politician Lord Hartington, at the Guards Chapel, Wellington Barracks, London, on 5 January 1889. Lady Alice was also a lady-in-waiting to her friend, Queen Alexandra.

The couple had three children together:

- Lady Victoria Alice Louisa (24 June 1892 – 26 November 1927); married firstly in 1915 Liberal politician Neil Primrose (1882–1917); married secondly in 1919 the Conservative politician Malcolm Bullock.
- Edward, Lord Stanley (1894–1938), father of John Stanley, 18th Earl of Derby
- Hon. Oliver Stanley (4 May 1896 – 10 December 1950), married in 1920 Lady Maureen Vane-Tempest-Stewart, daughter of 7th Marquess of Londonderry and the Hon. Edith Chaplin

Their two sons achieved the rare distinction of sitting in the same Cabinet between May and October 1938 until Edward's death. Their only daughter, Lady Victoria, died aged 35, from a fractured skull sustained in a horse-riding accident caused by striking her head on a low iron railway arch.

Lord Derby died in February 1948 at the family seat of Knowsley Hall, Lancashire, aged 82. His other country seat was Coworth Park at Sunningdale in Berkshire. He was succeeded in the earldom by his grandson, Edward. He is buried at St Mary's Church, Knowsley. The Countess of Derby died in July 1957.

== Legacy ==
Many good stories are told of Lord Derby, including the following, which is surely apocryphal not least because he was a man of utter probity. He was spotted by a steward feeding one of his horses shortly before the start of a race. When challenged, His Lordship explained the substance was sugar, and promptly ate a lump himself to show that it was innocuous. "Keep the creature on a tight rein until a furlong out, then let him have his head, He'll do the rest". His Lordship added, almost as an afterthought: "If you hear anything coming up behind you, don't worry and don't turn round, it will only be me".

A county directory of 1903 describes Coworth House as "an ancient building standing in a thickly wooded park". As Derby also owned Knowsley Hall in Lancashire, his principal country seat, and a London townhouse in Stratford Place, St James's, Coworth tended to be occupied only during Ascot race meetings. The Derby landholdings in 1833 consisted of some seventy thousand acres in Lancashire, Cheshire, Surrey and Kent in England and Flintshire in Wales, but not a single acre in Derbyshire. The Landholding produced a rent-roll of £163,273 p.a.

On 9 January 1923, the Earl sold 143 acres of land known as the Keston Lodge Estate in Kent for £6000 to the property developer Frederick Rogers who renamed it Keston Park.

Coworth House continued with Lord Derby until his death in 1948. It then became the home of Lady Derby, who died there on 24 July 1957, aged ninety-four. A month later her former home was advertised for sale in The Times; and at this or a subsequent date was converted to use as a Roman Catholic convent school. The next owner is thought to have been Vivian 'White' Lloyd who died in 1972.

== Arms ==
Coat of arms of Edward Stanley, 17th Earl of Derby
Crest On a chapeau gules turned up ermine an eagle, wings extended, or, preying on an infant in its cradle proper, swaddled gules, the cradle laced or. Escutcheon Argent, on a bend azure three stags' heads caboshed or. Supporters Dexter, a griffin, wings elevated; sinister, a stag, each or, and ducally collared with line reflexed over the back azure. Motto Sans changer (Without changing). Orders The Most Noble Order of the Garter (KG).

== Screen portrayals ==
Lord Derby was portrayed by Frank Middlemass in an episode of the 1981 TV miniseries Winston Churchill: The Wilderness Years.

== Sources ==
- Victor Bonham-Carter (1963). Soldier True:the Life and Times of Field-Marshal Sir William Robertson. London: Frederick Muller Limited.
- Ridley, Jane (2021), Never A Dull Moment, London: Chatto & Windus, ISBN 0701188707 (a biography of George V)
- Sheffield, Gary & Bourne, Douglas Haig War Diaries and Letters 1914-18, (Phoenix, London, 2005) ISBN 0-7538-2075-7
- Randolph Churchill, King of Lancashire The Official Life of Edward, Seventeenth Earl Of Derby, 1865-1948 (Heinemann, London, 1959)

Parliament of the United Kingdom
Preceded by Frank Hardcastle	Member of Parliament for Westhoughton; 1892–1906	Succeeded by William Wilson
Political offices
Preceded by Joseph Powell Williams	Financial Secretary to the War Office; 1901–1903	Succeeded by William Bromley-Davenport
Preceded by Austen Chamberlain	Postmaster General; 1903–1905	Succeeded by Sydney Buxton
New office	Chairman of the Joint War Air Committee; 1916	Succeeded by The Earl Curzon of Kedleston as President of the Air Board
Preceded by Harold Tennant	Under-Secretary of State for War; 1916	Succeeded by Ian Macpherson
Preceded by David Lloyd George	Secretary of State for War; 1916–1918	Succeeded by The Viscount Milner
Preceded by Sir Laming Worthington-Evans, Bt	Secretary of State for War; 1922–1924	Succeeded by Stephen Walsh
Diplomatic posts
Preceded by The Viscount Bertie of Thame	British Ambassador to France; 1918–1920	Succeeded by The Lord Hardinge of Penshurst
Honorary titles
Preceded by The Lord Shuttleworth	Lord Lieutenant of Lancashire; 1928–1948	Succeeded by The Earl Peel
Peerage of England
Preceded by Frederick Stanley	Earl of Derby; 1908–1948	Succeeded by Edward Stanley
Professional and academic associations
Preceded by Frederick, 16th Earl of Derby	President of the Historic Society of Lancashire and Cheshire; 1908–36	Succeeded by William Fergusson Irvine
