= 1962 Preakness Stakes =

87th running of the Preakness Stakes

87th Preakness Stakes
- The Preakness Stakes
- Location: Pimlico Race Course, Baltimore, Maryland, United States
- Date: May 19, 1962
- Winning horse: Greek Money
- Jockey: John L. Rotz
- Conditions: Fast
- Surface: Dirt

The 1962 Preakness Stakes was the 87th running of the $200,000 Preakness Stakes thoroughbred horse race. The race took place on May 19, 1962, and was televised in the United States on the CBS television network. Greek Money, who was jockeyed by John L. Rotz, won the race by a scant nose over runner-up Ridan (horse) in a fighting finish. Approximate post time was 5:50 p.m. Eastern Time. The race was run on a fast track in a final time of 1:56-1/5. The Maryland Jockey Club reported total attendance of 33,854, this is recorded as second highest on the list of American thoroughbred racing top attended events for North America in 1962.

== Payout ==
The 87th Preakness Stakes Payout Schedule

Program Number	Horse Name	Win	Place	Show
10	Greek Money	$23.80	$9.40	$6.00
6	Ridan	-	$5.00	$3.40
9	Roman Line	-	-	$5.80

== The full chart ==
Finish Position	Margin (lengths)	Post Position	Horse name	Jockey	Trainer	Owner	Post Time Odds	Purse Earnings
1st	0	10	Greek Money	John L. Rotz	Virgil W. Raines	Brandywine Stable		
2nd	nose	6	Ridan	Manuel Ycaza	LeRoy Jolley	Dorothy Jolley	2.70-1 co-favorite	$30,000
3rd	53/4	9	Roman Line	Jimmy Combest	Vester R. Wright	T. Alie Grissom	13.70-1	$15,000
4th	71/2	2	Vimy Ridge	Sam Boulmetis	Thomas J. Barry	Dr. Frank E. Power	11.80-1	$7,500
5th	91/4	11	Sunrise County	Ismael Valenzuela	Tommy Kelly	Townsend B. Martin	17.80-1	
6th	11	1	Green Hornet	Howard Grant	Virgil Raines	Dorothy D. Brown	83.20-1	
7th	121/2	7	Crimson Satan	Billy J. Phelps	Gordon R. Potter	Crimson King Farm	13.80-1	
8th	141/2	5	Decidedly	Bill Hartack	Horatio Luro	El Peco Ranch	3.80-1	
9th	16	8	Flying Johnnie	Walter Blum	Herbert Paley	Jopa Stable	92.60-1	
10th	191/2	3	Jaipur	Robert Ussery	Winbert F. Mulholland	George D. Widener Jr.	2.70-1 co-favorite	
11th	341/2	4	Prego	Larry Adams	Thomas Mercer Waller	Robert Lehman	53.10-1	

- Winning Breeder: Renappi Corporation; (KY)
- Winning Time: 1:56 1/5
- Track Condition: Fast
- Total Attendance: 33,854
