= Open Fire (horse) =

American Thoroughbred racehorse

- Sire: Cochise
- Grandsire: Boswell
- Dam: Lucy Lufton
- Damsire: Nimbus
- Sex: Mare
- Foaled: 1961
- Country: United States
- Color: Bay
- Breeder: Renappi Corp.
- Owner: Brandywine Stable
- Trainer: Virgil W. "Buddy" Raines
- Record: 30: 13-6-5
- Earnings: $227,329

Major wins
- Delaware Handicap (1966); Spinster Stakes (1966); Diana Handicap (1966)

Awards
- DRF United States Champion Handicap Mare (1966)

Honors
- Aiken Thoroughbred Racing Hall of Fame (1977)
- Last updated on August 18, 2020

Open Fire (1961–1980) was an American Thoroughbred Champion racehorse who was elected to the Aiken Thoroughbred Racing Hall of Fame in 1977.

== Background ==
Open Fire was a bay mare sired by Brandywine Stable's multiple stakes winner Cochise. Open Fire was out of the mare Lucy Lufton, whose sire Nimbus was a son of Nearco, one of the world's most influential sires in the history of Thoroughbred racing.

Owned and raced under the Brandywine Stable banner by Delaware Park Racetrack president Donald P. Ross, Open Fire was trained by Buddy Raines.

== Racing career ==
A late developer, in 1966 the five-year-old was one of the dominant mares in American racing whose performances earned her United States Champion Handicap Mare honors from the Daily Racing Form. The rival Thoroughbred Racing Association award was won by Summer Scandal. That year, she had three major stakes wins, set a new track record for 1 1/8 miles at Saratoga Race Course, and equaled the Delaware Park Racetrack record for 1 1/4 miles. In one of her impressive performances at Saratoga, Open Fire won the Diana Handicap by ten lengths on a sloppy track.

== Breeding record ==
Retired to broodmare duty, Open Fire produced seven foals.
