= Summer Scandal =

American racehorse (foaled 1962)

- Sire: Summer Tan
- Grandsire: Heliopolis
- Dam: Go-Modern
- Damsire: Watling Street
- Sex: Mare
- Foaled: 1962
- Country: United States
- Color: Chestnut
- Breeder: Ralph C. Wilson Jr.
- Owner: Harborvale Stable (David G. Volkert)
- Trainer: J. Woods Garth
- Record: 22: 11-2-1
- Earnings: US$$194,154

Awards
- American Champion Handicap Mare (1966)

Summer Scandal (foaled Apr 18, 1962 in Kentucky) was an American National Champion Thoroughbred racemare bred by Buffalo Bills owner Ralph Wilson. She was raced by Harborvale Stable, the nom de course for David G. Volkert, owner of Volkert & Associates Inc., an engineering, architectural, planning and environmental company based in Mobile, Alabama.

== Background ==
Summer Scandal's breeder, Ralph Wilson, was also the breeder of Arazi whose performance in winning the 1991 Breeders' Cup Juvenile is still talked about to this day. Summer Scandal was sired by Summer Tan, a multiple top-level stakes winner who also sired the good runners, Indian Sunlite and Sunrise County. Summer Tan was also the damsire of Typecast, the 1972 American Champion Older Female Horse, as well as 1985 Breeders' Cup Classic winner, Proud Truth.

Summer Scandal's dam was the daughter of Go-Modern who was the only American foal by the English sire Watling Street who died in 1953 after standing there for just one season. Watling Street was the winner of the 1942 Epsom Derby for owner/breeder Lord Derby who also owned his sire Fairway, a highly successful racehorse. Among Fairway's wins were the St. Leger Stakes and two editions of the Champion Stakes. Watling Street's dam, Ranai, won two minor races before producing many good winners including the 2000 Guineas winner Garden Path.

== Racing career ==
Owner David Volkert entrusted Summer Scandal's race conditioning to trainer Woods Garth. She did not make her racing debut until age three in 1965 when she won three of five starts. On June 23 she ran second to Terentia in the Post-Deb Stakes at Monmouth Park Racetrack. In her next start on the same Monmouth track, Summer Scandal turned the tables and beat Terentia by six lengths with Marshua another 2 3/4 lengths further back in third.

At age four, Summer Scandal would be voted the TRA's Champion Handicap Mare for her impressive performances in 1966 that saw her win the Top Flight Handicap, Maskette Handicap and Beldame Stakes. In the fall Summer Scandal was shipped to Lexington, Kentucky to compete in the October 27, 1966 edition of the Spinster Stakes at Keeneland Race Course. Her first such travelling at a long distance, she finished third behind winner Open Fire and runner-up Old Hat.

As a broodmare, Summer Scandal produced a foal by two great runners, Ribot and Buckpasser. While neither were successful on the track, Ribot's 1969 daughter Checkered Career, who won only once in 21 starts, was the dam of the colt Esops Foibles. He won both the 1978 Louisiana Derby and Arkansas Derby and finished fifth in the 1978 Kentucky Derby for owner Jerry Frankel.
