= Harry Wragg =

British jockey and horse trainer (1902–1985)

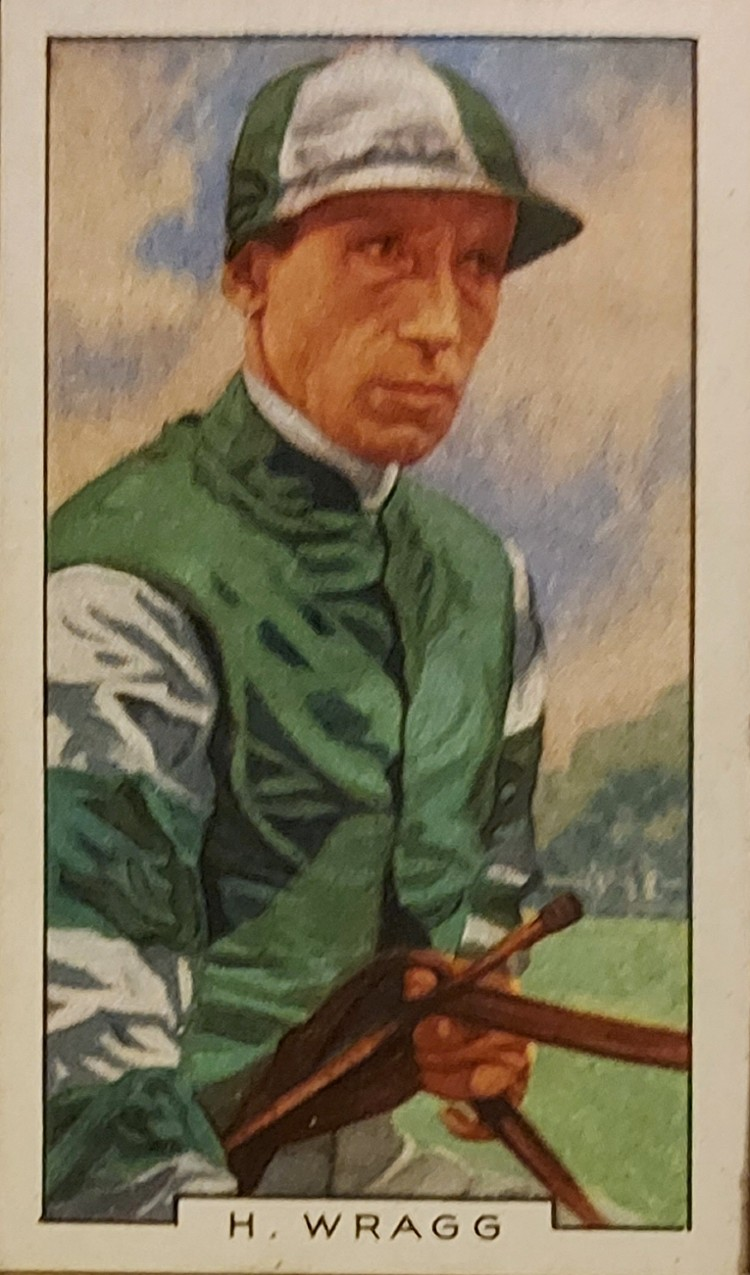
- Harry Wragg, in the colours of Sir H. Cunliffe-Owen (Gallaher's cigarette card, 1936)

Personal information
- Born: 10 June 1902 Sheffield, England
- Died: 20 October 1985 (aged 83)
- Occupations: Jockey; Trainer

Horse racing career
- Sport: Horse racing
- Career wins: 1,762 as a jockey

Major racing wins
- British Classic Race wins as jockey: 2000 Guineas (1); 1000 Guineas (3); Epsom Derby (3); Epsom Oaks (4); St. Leger Stakes (2) British Classic Race wins as trainer: 2000 Guineas (1); 1000 Guineas (2); Epsom Derby (1); St. Leger Stakes (1)

Racing awards
- British flat racing Champion Jockey (1941)

Significant horses
- Felstead, Blenheim, Rockfel, Watling Street, Herringbone, Sun Stream, Garden Path, Darius, Psidium, Abermaid, Intermezzo, Teenoso.

Harry Wragg (10 June 1902 – 20 October 1985) was a British jockey and racehorse trainer, who gained the nickname "The Head Waiter" due to his "come from behind" riding style. In a 27-year riding career, Wragg rode over 1700 winners in Britain and Ireland, including three victories in The Derby and ten in other British Classic Races. He then embarked on a successful 36-year training career, in which he trained many important winners including five more classics. He retired in 1982 and died three years later.

== Background and family ==
Harry Wragg was born on 10 June 1902 at Sheffield in Yorkshire. Although his family had no direct links with horse racing, Wragg's father, Arthur, had had some success as an amateur boxer and athlete. Two of Wragg's younger brothers became successful jockeys: Sam Wragg (1909–83) won three classics including the Derby on Pont l'Eveque, while Arthur Wragg (1912–54) finished sixth in the jockey's championship in 1944.

== Riding career ==
Wragg took up riding in his early teens and moved to Newmarket where he was apprenticed to the trainer George Colling. He rode his first winner in 1919. Wragg attracted the attention of important figures including the trainer Richard Marsh and the owner Solomon Joel, and in 1925 he had his first major success when he won the Eclipse Stakes on Polyphontes.

Wragg developed a riding style which relied strongly on timing, intelligence and tactical skill. At the time the fashion was for races to be run end-to-end, with the best horses racing close to the lead from the start. Wragg, however, preferred to restrain or "hold up" horses, preserving their speed for a late challenge. His proficiency in this earned him the nickname "the Head Waiter". In 1928, Wragg's skill was shown to its best advantage when he was booked to ride the 33/1 outsider Felstead in the Derby. The race was run at an exceptionally fast pace, which saw many of the leading contenders virtually exhausted in the closing stages. Wragg held up the outsider before producing him with a challenge inside the final furlong to win easily in record time.

Wragg subsequently became stable jockey to Felstead's trainer Oswald "Ossie" Bell at Newmarket. During the 1930s he was also closely associated with the stable of Jack Jarvis. For Jarvis he won the St Leger on Sandwich in 1931 and the 1000 Guineas on Campanula three years later. In 1938 he rode the Bell-trained filly Rockfel, whom he described as the best horse he had ever ridden, to win the Oaks and Champion Stakes. Wragg had won his second Derby in 1930 riding Blenheim to victory after the horse had been rejected by the Aga Khan III's retained jockey Michael Beary. Low points of the decade included an indifferent ride on Sandwich in the 1931 Derby, when he appeared to misjudge the waiting tactics, and a broken leg sustained in a fall at Newcastle Racecourse in 1932.

Between 1931 and 1953 Gordon Richards won 22 of the 23 jockey's championships. The only interruption in Richards run of success came in 1941, when he missed much of the season through injury. Wragg rode 71 winners including the wartime substitute Oaks on Commotion, to claim his only championship. During the War, Wragg served in the Royal Artillery reaching the rank of sergeant before moving at his own request from an office position to an Anti-Aircraft battery. In 1942 Wragg won a third Derby on Watling Street: he again employed exaggerated waiting tactics, taking the lead on Lord Derby's temperamental colt fifty yards from the finish and winning by a neck. Before the end of the war he won further classics for Lord Derby on Herringbone, Sun Stream and Garden Path. He retired from riding at the end of 1946, a year in which he won the Oaks on Steady Aim.

== Training career ==
Wragg began training in 1947 at Abington Place in Newmarket, sending out the winners of 25 races in his first season. His first big win came in 1948 when Billet won the Chester Cup and his first classic winner was Darius in the 1954 2000 Guineas. In 1961 Wragg trained his first Derby winner when Psidium, who was considered the stable's second string, won at Epsom at odds of 66/1. Abermaid won the 1000 Guineas in 1962 and at the end of the decade, Wragg completed a classic double when Full Dress won the 1000 Guineas and Intermezzo won the St Leger in 1969. He never won the trainers' championship being narrowly beaten to the title in 1961 and 1962 by Noel Murless and Dick Hern respectively.

During his training career, Wragg was always willing to employ new methods, regularly weighing his horses and timing their training gallops at a time when these practices were relatively rare in Britain. He was also keen to exploit international opportunities: in the 1950s and 1960s he won the Gran Premio del Jockey Club twice and the Grosser Preis von Baden on four occasions. Wragg trained many winners in Ireland including Fidalgo, who won the 1959 Irish Derby after finishing second in the English equivalent.

== Retirement and family ==
Wragg retired from training in 1982, passing on the Abington Place stable to his son Geoff. In his last season he trained a two-year-old colt of apparently modest ability named Teenoso who went on to win the Derby in 1983 and the King George VI and Queen Elizabeth Stakes a year later. Wragg's other son, Peter, became a bloodstock agent, while his daughter, Susan, married the jockey Manny Mercer. Mercer was killed in September 1959 at Ascot Racecourse after falling from a horse trained by his father-in-law. Harry Wragg died in October 1985 at the age of 83.

In 1999, he was ranked 7th on the Racing Post list of top jockeys of the 20th century. It was also remarked that he was the only great flat jockey of the century to be a great trainer as well.

== Popular culture ==
In rhyming slang Harry Wragg was widely used to mean "fag" (cigarette) and it still has usage amongst the small Protestant community of south County Dublin (Ireland) despite his death in 1985.

The Kinks have a song about smoking called "Harry Rag" on their 1967 album Something Else by The Kinks.

Partick Thistle F.C. are referred to as The Harry Wraggs in rhyming slang for their nickname The Jags.
