= Garden path =

Garden path may refer to:

- Garden path, a path through a garden, see garden design
- Garden Path, a British racehorse
- Garden-path sentence, a sentence which leads the reader to an incorrect parse
