= Delaware Oaks =

- Class: Grade 3 stakes
- Location: Delaware Park Racetrack; Stanton, Delaware, United States
- Inaugurated: 1938
- Race type: Thoroughbred - Flat racing
- Website: www.delawarepark.com

Race information
- Distance: 8.5 furlongs (1 1/16 miles)
- Surface: Dirt
- Track: left-handed
- Qualification: Three-year-old Fillies
- Weight: Assigned
- Purse: $300,000

The Delaware Oaks Stakes is an American Thoroughbred horse race run annually in mid July at Delaware Park Racetrack in Stanton near Wilmington, Delaware.

Part of the Del Cap Festival Weekend that features other races over the two days including the Delaware Handicap, the Oaks is open to three-year-old fillies and is run over one and one-sixteenth miles on the dirt.

Currently, the Grade III race offers a purse of $300,000.

== Historical notes ==
The inaugural running of the Delaware Oaks took place on June 28, 1938, and was won by Isabel Dodge Sloane's filly Handcuff.

Coming off her June 6, 1941 win in the Top Flight Handicap at New York's Belmont Park, Tangled won the Oaks for the Greentree Stable of Helen Hay Whitney. Trained and ridden by future U.S. Racing Hall of Fame inductees John Gaver Sr. and Eddie Arcaro, the filly beat her closest rival by nine lengths while setting a new track record with a winning time of 1:49 4/5 for a mile and one-eighth on dirt.

United States Hall of Fame fillies Gallorette (1945), Dark Mirage (1968), Gallant Bloom (1969) and Desert Vixen (1973) have all won this race, as did the Canadian Horse Racing Hall of Fame inductee Lauries Dancer in 1971.

== Records ==
Speed record:

- 1:41.79 @ 1 1–16 miles: Calamity Kate (2015)
- 1:48.20 @ 1 1–8 miles: Cum Laude Laurie (1977)

Most wins by a jockey:

- 4 - Eddie Arcaro (1940, 1941, 1945, 1955)

Most wins by a trainer:

- 4 - James E. Fitzsimmons (1939, 1942, 1946, 1955)

Most wins by an owner:

- 3 - Belair Stud Stable (1939, 1942, 1946)
- 3 - Christiana Stables (1947, 1972, 1974)
- 3 - King Ranch (1956, 1959, 1969)

== Winners ==
Year	Winner	Jockey	Trainer	Owner	Dist. (Miles)	Time	Gr.
2026	Luv Your Neighbor	Luis Saez	Michael Stidham	Lael Stables	1 1-16 m	1:44.05	G3
2025	Fondly	Irad Ortiz Jr.	H. Graham Motion	Eclipse Thoroughbred Partners & Madaket Stables	1 1–16 m	1:45.61	G3
2024	Power Squeeze	Javier Castellano	Jorge Delgado	Lea Farms	1 1–16 m	1:45.65	G3
2023	Foggy Night	Paco Lopez	Robert Reid Jr.	Pine Brook Farm	1 1–16 m	1:45.07	G3
2022	Midnight Stroll	Eric Canel	John P. Terranova II	Gatsas Stables, R. A. Hill Stable, & Steven Schoenfeld	1 1–16 m	1:44.31	G3
2021	Crazy Beautiful	Mike E. Smith	Kenneth McPeek	Phoenix Thoroughbred III	1 1–16 m	1:46.33	G3
2020	Project Whiskey	Frankie Pennington	Robert E. Reid Jr.	Cash Is King Stable LLC & LC Racing	1 1–16 m	1:44.04	G3
2019	Jaywalk	Joe Bravo	John C. Servis	Cash is King LLC & D. J. Stable LLC	1 1–16 m	1:43.21	G3
2018	Red Ruby	Paco Lopez	Kellyn D. Gorder	Sandra Sexton, Brandi Nicholson & Steven Nicholson	1 1–16 m	1:42.41	G3
2017	It Tiz Well	Drayden Van Dyke	Jerry Hollendorfer	Tommy Town Thoroughbreds LLC	1 1–16 m	1:43.55	G3
2016	Dark Nile	Daniel Centeno	Arnaud Delacour	Winstar Farm	1 1–16 m	1:46.54	G3
2015	Calamity Kate	Edgar Prado	Kelly J. Breen	Lori & George Hall	1 1–16 m	1:41.79	G3
2014	Fortune Pearl	Trevor McCarthy	H. Graham Motion	Zanim R. Meahjohn	1 1–16 m	1:44.69	G2
2013	Dancing Afleet	Joshua Navarro	Timothy F. Ritchey	Tim Ritchey Racing Stables & Beverly Frazier	1 1–16 m	1:44.59	G2
2012	Grace Hall	Javier Castellano	Anthony W. Dutrow	Michael Dubb, Bethlehem Stables (Mike Caruso), The Elkstone Group (Stuart Grant)	1 1–16 m	1:42.59	G2
2011	St. John's River	Jose Lezcano	Andrew Leggio Jr.	Dede McGehee	1 1–16 m	1:44.39	G2
2010	Blind Luck	Joel Rosario	Jerry Hollendorfer	Jerry Hollendorfer, Mark Dedomenico, John Carver, Peter Abruzzo	1 1–16 m	1:43.34	G2
2009	Careless Jewel	Robert Landry	Josie Carroll	Donver Stable (Donna & Verne Dubinsky)	1 1–16 m	1:42.95	G2
2008	Proud Spell	Gabriel Saez	J. Larry Jones	Brereton C. Jones	1 1–16 m	1:43.34	G2
2007	Moon Catcher	Carlos Marquez Jr.	Timothy F. Ritchey	CJZ Racing Stable & Timothy F. Ritchey	1 1–16 m	1:42:39	G2
2006	Adieu	John Velazquez	Todd A. Pletcher	Michael Tabor, Derrick Smith, Sue Magnier	1 1–16 m	1:43.72	G2
2005	R Lady Joy	Jose Lezcano	Kirk Ziadie	Richard Averill	1 1–16 m	1:43.25	G2
2004	Yearly Report	Jerry D. Bailey	Bob Baffert	Golden Eagle Farm	1 1–16 m	1:43.80	G2
2003	Island Fashion	Iggy Puglisi	Nick Canani	Everest Stable (Jeffrey L. Nielsen)	1 1–16 m	1:44.95	G3
2002	Allamerican Bertie	Larry Melancon	Steve Flint	Klein family (Richard, Bertram, Elaine)	1 1–16 m	1:43.81	G3
2001	Zonk	Michael McCarthy	John Servis	Fox Hill Farms (Rick Porter)	1 1–16 m	1:45.27	G3
2000	Sincerely	Michael McCarthy	H. Graham Motion	R. Larry Johnson	1 1–16 m	1:43.83	G3
1999	Brushed Halory	Eddie Martin Jr.	Josie Carroll	James & Alice Sapara	1 1–16 m	1:43.42	G3
1998	Nickel Classic	Calvin Borel	Mark Danner	Calvin L. Johnston	1 1–16 m	1:42.81	
1997	Runup The Colors	Pat Day	Neil J. Howard	William S. Farish III	1 1–16 m	1:44.27	
1996	Like a Hawk	Robert E. Colton	John R. S. Fisher	Erdenheim Farm	1 m (t)	1:37.01	
1983	1995	Race not held					
1982	Lady Eleanor	Rick Wilson	Bruce N. Levine	Robert Levine	1 1–8 m	1:50.20	G2
1981	Up The Flagpole	Kenneth D. Black	Del W. Carroll Jr.	William S. Farish III	1 1–8 m	1:49.40	G2
1980	Bishop's Ring	Mario Pino	Charles Peoples	Bayard Sharp	1 1–8 m	1:48.60	G1
1979	It's In The Air	Bill Shoemaker	Laz Barrera	Harbor View Farm	1 1–8 m	1:49.40	G1
1978	White Star Line	Jeffrey Fell	Woody Stephens	Newstead Farms	1 1–8 m	1:52.60	G1
1977	Cum Laude Laurie	Jorge Velasquez	Lou Rondinello	Daniel M. Galbreath	1 1–8 m	1:48.20	G1
1976	Pacific Princess	Eddie Maple	Roger Laurin	Windfields Farm	1 1–8 m	1:49.60	G1
1975	Let Me Linger	Carlos Barrera	Edward J. Yowell	Oak Crest Stable	1 1–8 m	1:51.40	G1
1974	Plantain	Gregg McCarron	Henry S. Clark	Christiana Stables	1 1–8 m	1:50.40	G1
1973	Desert Vixen	Jorge Velasquez	Thomas F. Root Sr.	Harry T. Mangurian Jr.	1 1–8 m	1:49.20	G1
1972	Light Hearted	Eldon Nelson	Henry S. Clark	Christiana Stables	1 1–8 m	1:49.60	
1971	Lauries Dancer	Sandy Hawley	James C. Bentley	Helen G. Stollery	1 1–8 m	1:50.80	
1970	Virginia Cracker	Robert Howard	Glenn L. Ballenger	Gordon Grayson	1 1–8 m	1:49.80	
1969	Gallant Bloom	John L. Rotz	Max Hirsch	King Ranch	1 1–8 m	1:51.20	
1968	Dark Mirage	Manuel Ycaza	Everett W. King	Lloyd I. Miller	1 1–8 m	1:50.40	
1967	Lewiston	Garth Patterson	Oscar White	Walter M. Jeffords Jr.	1 1–8 m	1:51.40	
1966	Lady Pitt	Walter Blum	Stephen A. DiMauro	Golden Triangle Stable (Thomas A. Eazor)	1 1–8 m	1:49.80	
1965	Juanita	Buck Thornburg	Oscar White	Walter M. Jeffords Jr.	1 1–8 m	1:48.80	
1964	Miss Cavandish	Howard Grant	Roger Laurin	Harry S. Nichols	1 1–8 m	1:51.00	
1963	Spicy Living	Jimmy Combest	Jimmy Rowe	Eleanora Sears	1 1–8 m	1:50.20	
1962	North South Gal	Leroy Moyers	W. Clayton Prickett	Alfred G. Groleau	1 1–8 m	1:52.00	
1961	Primonetta	Bill Shoemaker	James P. Conway	Darby Dan Farm	1 1–8 m	1:48.80	
1960	Rash Statement	Charlie Burr	Allen R. Hultz	Hal Price Headley	1 1–8 m	1:50.60	
1959	Resaca	William Boland	Max Hirsch	King Ranch	1 1–8 m	1:51.60	
1958	Big Effort	Pete Anderson	J. Elliott Burch	Brookmeade Stable	1 1–8 m	1:52.20	
1957	Bayou	Bill Hartack	Moody Jolley	Claiborne Farm	1 1–8 m	1:51.60	
1956	Dotted Line	Dave Gorman	Max Hirsch	King Ranch	1 1–8 m	1:51.00	
1955	High Voltage	Eddie Arcaro	James E. Fitzsimmons	Wheatley Stable	1 1–8 m	1:50.60	
1954	Parlo	Jack Westrope	Richard E. Handlen	Foxcatcher Farm	1 1–8 m	1:51.40	
1953	Cerise Reine	Douglas Dodson	Thomas J. Kelly	Ada L. Rice	1 1–8 m	1:50.60	
1952	Big Mo	Nick Shuk	George M. Odom	Circle M Farm (Edward S. Moore)	1 1–8 m	1:52.00	
1951	Kiss Me Kate	Warren Mehrtens	Oscar White	Walter M. Jeffords Sr.	1 1–8 m	1:50.40	
1950	Next Move	Eric Guerin	William C. Winfrey	Alfred G. Vanderbilt Jr.	1 1–8 m	1:49.40	
1949	Nasophar	Jimmy Lynch	Sylvester E. Veitch	Cornelius Vanderbilt Whitney	1 1–8 m	1:50.00	
1948	Miss Request	Charles LeBlanc	James P. Conway	Florence Whitaker	1 1–8 m	1:50.40	
1947	Camargo	M. N. Gonzalez	Henry S. Clark	Christiana Stables	1 1–8 m	1:52.80	
1946	Bonnie Beryl	James Stout	James E. Fitzsimmons	Belair Stud Stable	1 1–8 m	1:51.00	
1945	Gallorette	Eddie Arcaro	Edward A. Christmas	William L. Brann	1 1–8 m	1:51.00	
1944	Plucky Maud	Robert Permane	Oleg T. Dubassoff	Lazy F Ranch	1 1–8 m	1:50.60	
1943	Race not held due to Federal government Wartime restrictions						
1942	Vagrancy	Tommy Malley	James E. Fitzsimmons	Belair Stud Stable	1 1–8 m	1:54.00	
1941	Tangled	Eddie Arcaro	John M. Gaver Sr.	Greentree Stable	1 1–8 m	1:49.80	
1940	Piquet	Eddie Arcaro	John M. Gaver Sr.	Greentree Stable	1 1–8 m	1:52.40	
1939	Wise Lady	Hilton Dabson	James E. Fitzsimmons	Belair Stud Stable	1 1–8 m	1:53.60	
1938	Handcuff	Jack Westrope	Hugh L. Fontaine	Brookmeade Stable	1 1–8 m	1:53.00	
