= Pucker Up Stakes =

- Class: Listed
- Location: Ellis Park Race Course; Henderson, Kentucky, United States
- Inaugurated: 1961 (at Arlington Park)
- Race type: Thoroughbred - Flat racing
- Website: Ellis Park

Race information
- Distance: 1 1/8 miles (9.0 furlongs)
- Surface: Turf
- Track: Left-handed
- Qualification: Three-year-old fillies
- Weight: Scale Weight
- Purse: $400,000 (2025)

The Pucker Up Stakes is an American Thoroughbred horse race for 3-year-old fillies held annually in early August at Ellis Park Race Course near Henderson, Kentucky. A Listed event, it is contested over a distance of 9 furlongs (1 1/8 miles) on turf.

The race was named in honor of Ada L. Rice's filly, Pucker Up. Pucker Up was one of five champions trained by U.S. Racing Hall of Fame trainer James P. Conway.

The race was inaugurated in 1961 and was run on the main track until 1974 and again in 1976. In 1974–75, it was run at 1 1/16 miles; in 1979 and 1986, the distance was 1 3/16 miles.

After the closure of Arlington Park in 2022 the event was scheduled to be moved to Churchill Downs, however the event was cancelled by Churchill Downs in an effort to limit racing on their newly laid turf course.

In 2023, the event was moved to Ellis Park and resumed running annually.

In 2026 the Thoroughbred Owners and Breeders Association downgraded the event from Grade III to Listed.

== Winners since 2000 ==
Year	Winner	Jockey	Trainer	Owner	Time
2025	Destino d'Oro	Luan Machado	Brad H. Cox	Steve Landers Racing LLC	1:45.64
2024	Waves of Mischief	Brian Hernandez Jr.	Brendan Walsh	Qatar Racing LLC	1:47.50
2023	Safeen	Luis Saez	Eddie Kenneally	Fergus Galvin and Rebbeca Hillen	1:46.83
2022	Race Not Run				
2021	Shantisara	Flavien Prat	Chad Brown	Michael Dubb, Madaket Stables and Robert LaPenta	1:51.91
2020	Race Not Run				
2019	Cafe Americano	Irad Ortiz Jr.	Chad Brown	Peter M. Brant	1:47.42
2018	Secret Message	Irad Ortiz Jr.	H. Graham Motion	Madaket Stables, et al.	1:50.01
2017	Fault	Miguel Mena	Michelle Lovell	Agave Racing	1:50.08
2016	Noble Beauty	Florent Geroux	Chad Brown	Great Point Stables	1:50.09
2015	Miz Money	Robby Albarado	Patti Miller	L.T.B. Inc./Hillerich Racing	1:49.80
2014	Sistas Stroll	Drayden Van Dyke	Thomas F. Proctor	Five Fillies Stable	1:55.13
2013	I'm Already Sexy	Florent Geroux	Wayne Catalano	Hit The Board Stables	1:48.12
2012	Leading Astray	Eduardo Pérez	Chris Block	Team Block	1:49.28
2011	Marketing Mix	Junior Alvarado	Thomas F. Proctor	Glen Hill Farm	1:49.24
2010	Dade Babe	Florent Geroux	Danny L. Miller	Lawrence G. Peifer	1:51.77
2009	Hot Cha Cha	James Graham	Philip Sims	Nelson McMakin	1:47.67
2008	Closeout	Jamie Theriot	Thomas F. Proctor	Glen Hill Farm	1:53.22
2007	Dreaming of Anna	E. T. Baird	Wayne Catalano	Frank C. Calabrese	1:48.20
2006	Vacare	Carlos Marquez, Jr.	Chris Block	Lathenbach Stables	1:49.71
2005	Royal Copenhagen	Shaun Bridgmohan	Laura de Seroux	Richard L. Duchossois	1:48.76
2004	Ticker Tape	Kent Desormeaux	James M. Cassidy	D. Pearson/J. Sweesy	1:48.63
2003	Aud	Brian Peck	Anthony Reinstedler	Willmott Stables	1:49.16
2002	Little Treasure	Rene R. Douglas	Laura De Seroux	Port Trust et al.	1:49.82
2001	Snow Dance	Craig Perret	John Ward Jr.	John Oxley	1:47.93
2000	Solvig	Pat Day	Carl Nafzger	Bentley Smith Trust	1:52.40
