= Pucker Up (horse) =

American-bred Thoroughbred racehorse

- Sire: Olympia
- Grandsire: Heliopolis
- Dam: Lou Lea
- Damsire: Bull Lea
- Sex: Mare
- Foaled: 1953
- Country: United States
- Colour: Bay
- Breeder: Danada Farm
- Owner: Ada L. Rice
- Trainer: James P. Conway
- Record: 32: 16-8-4
- Earnings: US$304,585

Major wins
- Misty Isle Stakes (1956); Jersey Belle Stakes (1956); Beldame Stakes (1957); Arlington Matron Handicap (1957); Washington Park Handicap (1957); Spinster Stakes Prep (1957)

Awards
- American Champion Older Female Horse (1957)

Honours
- Pucker Up Stakes at Arlington Park

Pucker Up (1953) was an American Champion Thoroughbred racing mare. She was bred by Dan and Ada Rice's Danada Farm, and raced under Mrs. Rice's name. Her training was handled by future U.S. Racing Hall of Fame inductee, Jimmy Conway and his assistant, Al Robertson.

Racing in Chicago, in July she won the Arlington Matron Handicap and in early September the Washington Park Handicap. and then on September 21 the Beldame Handicap at Belmont Park in Elmont, New York. After winning the October 17 Spinster Stakes Prep at Keeneland she finished second to Bornastar in the Spinster Stakes. Pucker Up was voted American Champion Older Female Horse of 1957. In 1961, Arlington Park Racetrack honored her with the Pucker Up Stakes, a race on turf for three-year-old fillies.

Retired to broodmare service at Danada Farm, of six foals Pucker Up's best runner was the filly Plucky Plan who was sired by Bold Ruler and who won the 1968 New Castle Stakes.
