= Herringbone (horse) =

British-bred Thoroughbred racehorse

- Sire: King Salmon
- Grandsire: Salmon-Trout
- Dam: Schiaparelli
- Damsire: Schiavoni
- Sex: Mare
- Foaled: 1940
- Country: United Kingdom
- Colour: Bay
- Breeder: Edward Stanley, 17th Earl of Derby
- Owner: Edward Stanley, 17th Earl of Derby
- Trainer: Walter Earl
- Record: 10: 4–1–2

Major wins
- New 1000 Guineas (1943); New St Leger Stakes (1943)

Herringbone (1940 – September 1961) was a British Thoroughbred racehorse and broodmare, best known for winning two Classics in 1943. The filly won four times from ten races in a track career which lasted from spring 1942 until September 1943. As a two-year-old in 1942 she won twice from five starts but was not among the best of her generation. After being beaten on her three-year-old debut she won the 1000 Guineas over one mile at and finished fourth in the Oaks over one and a half miles a month later. In September she beat a field which included the Derby winner Straight Deal to win the St Leger Stakes over one and three quarter miles. All three of the races took place at Newmarket's July Course. After her second classic win she was retired to stud, where she became a successful broodmare.

== Background ==
Herringbone was a bay mare bred by her owner Edward Stanley, 17th Earl of Derby, the seven-time British flat racing Champion Owner. She was sired by King Salmon, a descendant of the Byerley Turk, who finished second in the 1933 Epsom Derby and went on to win the Eclipse Stakes and the Coronation Cup. After a brief stud career in Britain, he was exported to stand as a stallion in Brazil. Herringbone's dam Schiaparelli won seven races and was a successful broodmare, producing seven other winners including Swallow Tail, who finished third in the 1949 Derby and won the King Edward VII Stakes. Her other descendants included Sassafras, Assert and Last Tycoon. Lord Derby sent the filly to his private trainer Walter Earl at his Stanley House stable in Newmarket, Suffolk.

Herringbone's racing career took place during World War II during which horse racing in Britain was subject to many restrictions. Several major racecourses, including Epsom and Doncaster, were closed for the duration of the conflict, either for safety reasons, or because they were being used by the military. Many important races were rescheduled to new dates and venues, often at short notice, and all five of the Classics were usually run at Newmarket.

== Racing career ==
=== 1942: two-year-old season ===
Racing as a two-year-old in 1942, Herringbone ran five times and won two races. She finished unplaced behind Lady Sybil in the Lidgate Stakes at Ascot in July and ran third to Open Warfare and Moonstone in the six furlong Balsham Stakes at Newmarket. Her earnings for the season totaled £576.

In the Free Handicap, a ranking of the season's best juveniles, Herringbone was assigned a weight of 116 pounds, seventeen pounds behind the top-rated Lady Sybil. Nasrullah was the top-rated colt on 132, three pounds ahead of the filly Ribbon, who had beaten him in the Middle Park Stakes.

=== 1943: three-year-old season ===
Herringbone began her three-year-old season in the seven furlong Upwell Stakes, a now discontinued race which served as a trial for the 1000 Guineas. She finished third to Ribbon in the first of their five meetings over the course of the season. On her next appearance she started at odds of 15/2 in a field of twelve fillies for the "New" 1000 Guineas, run on Newmarket's July course rather than its traditional home on the adjoining Rowley Mile. The race was run on 26 May, much later than its customary date in late April or early May. Ridden by Harry Wragg, Herringbone won by a neck from Ribbon, the 5/4 favourite, with Cincture third.

On 18 June, Herringbone returned to the July course for the "New" Oaks. She failed to reproduce her best form and finished fourth of the thirteen runners behind Why Hurry, a filly who had finished fifth in the Guineas. Ribbon finished second by a neck after being left at the start. In the Whepstead Stakes, a trial race for the St Leger, Herringbone finished second to the Derby runner-up Umiddad, with Ribbon fourth. The race however, was unsatisfactory, with a very slow early pace resulting in a bunched sprint finish.

In September, Herringbone contested the "New" St Leger over one mile, six and a half furlongs on the July course. Her opponents included Ribbon and Why Hurry, as well as Nasrullah and the "New" Derby winner Straight Deal, who started favourite. The race was rough and controversial, with a good deal of barging in the closing stages. Straight Deal took the lead inside the final furlong but was challenged and overtaken by Ribbon who looked sure to win until Harry Wragg produced Herringbone with a strong run in the last few yards. Herringbone and Ribbon crossed the line together, less than a length in front of the Derby winner. With no photo-finish in operation, the result was decided solely by the racecourse judge, Major Petch, and although most observers believed that Ribbon had won, the race was awarded to Herringbone by a head.

== Assessment and honours ==
In their book, A Century of Champions, based on the Timeform rating system, John Randall and Tony Morris rated Herringbone a "superior" winner of the 1000 Guineas and the twenty-first best filly trained in Britain or Ireland in the 20th century.

== Stud record ==
Herringbone retired from racing to become a broodmare at her owner's stud. She produced eight winners including Dogger Bank (Princess of Wales's Stakes) and Entente Cordiale (Doncaster Cup) as well as Hylander who was a leading racehorse and sire in Venezuela. Her daughter Dilettante produced Idle Hour who won several races in Britain before becoming champion sire in Argentina in 1972. Another of Herringbone's daughters was Pin Stripe, the female ancestor of the St Leger winner Moon Madness and the Coronation Cup winner Sheriff's Star. Herringbone was euthanised in September 1961.

== Pedigree ==
Pedigree of Herringbone (GB), bay mare, 1940
Sire King Salmon (GB) 1930	Salmon-Trout; 1921	The Tetrarch	Roi Herode
Sire King Salmon (GB) 1930	Salmon-Trout; 1921	The Tetrarch	Vahren
Sire King Salmon (GB) 1930	Salmon-Trout; 1921	Salamandra	St. Frusquin
Sire King Salmon (GB) 1930	Salmon-Trout; 1921	Salamandra	Electra
Sire King Salmon (GB) 1930	Malva; 1919	Charles O'Malley	Desmond
Sire King Salmon (GB) 1930	Malva; 1919	Charles O'Malley	Goody Two-Shoes
Sire King Salmon (GB) 1930	Malva; 1919	Wild Arum	Robert le Diable
Sire King Salmon (GB) 1930	Malva; 1919	Wild Arum	Marliacea
Dam Schiaparelli (GB) 1935	Schiavoni; 1922	Swynford	John o' Gaunt
Dam Schiaparelli (GB) 1935	Schiavoni; 1922	Swynford	Canterbury Pilgrim
Dam Schiaparelli (GB) 1935	Schiavoni; 1922	Serenissima	Minoru
Dam Schiaparelli (GB) 1935	Schiavoni; 1922	Serenissima	Gondolette
Dam Schiaparelli (GB) 1935	Aileen; 1918	Nimbus	Elf
Dam Schiaparelli (GB) 1935	Aileen; 1918	Nimbus	Nephte
Dam Schiaparelli (GB) 1935	Aileen; 1918	Yveline	Gardefeu
Dam Schiaparelli (GB) 1935	Aileen; 1918	Yveline	Photime (Family No. 8-c)
