= Miss Request =

American-bred Thoroughbred racehorse

- Sire: Requested
- Grandsire: Questionnaire
- Dam: Throttle Wide
- Damsire: Flying Heels
- Sex: Filly
- Foaled: 1945
- Country: United States
- Colour: Bay
- Breeder: Ben F. Whitaker
- Owner: Florence Whitaker
- Trainer: James P. Conway
- Record: 56: 12-6-5
- Earnings: US$202,730

Major wins
- Delaware Oaks, (1948); Busher Handicap (1948); Ladies Handicap (1948); Empire City Handicap (1948); Beldame Handicap (1949)

Awards
- American Champion Three-Year-Old Filly (1948)

Miss Request (foaled 1945 in Kentucky) was an American Thoroughbred racehorse. She won several important races in 1948 and was voted American Champion Three-Year-Old Filly in that season.

== Background ==
Miss Request was bred by Dallas, Texas businessman Ben Whitaker and raced under the name of his wife Florence. Her sire was Requested, a good runner who won the 1942 Wood Memorial Stakes. Her dam (mother), Throttle Wide, was the daughter of another good runner, Flying Heels, whose wins included the 1930 Manhattan Handicap and the 1930 and 1931 editions of the Carter Handicap.

She was trained by future Hall of Fame inductee Jimmy Conway.

== Racing career ==
As a three-year-old Miss Request won the Delaware Oaks, the Busher Handicap at Belmont Park then after defeating the great Gallorette to win the Ladies Handicap in September, she defeated colts in the October 9, 1948 Empire City Handicap to clinch American Champion Three-Year-Old Filly honors.

Racing at age four, Miss Request earned her most important win of 1949 in the Beldame Handicap. In other major races, she finished second in the Ladies Handicap. Competing against males, she ran third in the New Orleans Handicap to stablemate My Request, and in the two-mile long Jockey Club Gold Cup, she finished a very solid third behind winner Ponder. Miss Request returned to racing at age five, but without success.

== Breeding record ==
As a broodmare, Miss Request produced seven foals, of which six raced with limited success.
