= Yearly Report =

American-bred Thoroughbred racehorse

- Sire: General Meeting
- Grandsire: Seattle Slew
- Dam: Fiscal Year
- Damsire: Half A Year
- Sex: Mare
- Foaled: 2001
- Country: United States
- Colour: Dark Brown
- Breeder: John C. Mabee
- Owner: Golden Eagle Farm
- Trainer: Bob Baffert
- Record: 10: 6-2-0
- Earnings: $835,900

Major wins
- Black-Eyed Susan Stakes (2004); Santa Ynez Stakes (2004); Delaware Oaks (2004); Stonerside Stakes (2004); Melair Stakes (2004)

Yearly Report (foaled January 23, 2001, in California) is an American thoroughbred mare racehorse. She is sired by multiple grade one stakes winner General Meeting, a leading American sire. He in turn was sired by Seattle Slew, who was a Triple Crown winner and United States Horse of the Year. She was out of the mare Fiscal Year.

Yearly Report raced 10 times and won or placed in eight races, six of them stakes races. She is probably best known for her wins in the Grade II $200,000 Black-Eyed Susan Stakes on May 14, 2004, and the grade one Delaware Oaks.

== Two-year-old season ==
Yearly Report was bought back by Mrs. John Mabee at Barretts Sale in May 2003 for $95,000. She debuted with a four-length score in a maiden special weight event at Hollywood Park in November. She earned $90,000 for her maiden victory. She also placed second to Silent Sighs in the state-bred California Breeders' Champion Stakes on December 27 at Santa Anita Park, losing by three lengths after a slow start in her initial stakes try.

== Three-year-old season ==
As a three-year-old in 2004, Yearly Report won the grade two Santa Ynez Stakes run at Santa Anita Park in March. That race is considered a prep for the Filly Triple Crown, including the Kentucky Oaks. In her third career start for trainer Bob Baffert, the bay filly made her graded stakes debut. Coming from off the pace, she went seven furlongs on the dirt in a stakes-record 1:21 for her second win by 4-1/2 lengths.

Golden Eagle Farm and Baffert then entered Yearly Report in the $200,000 grade two Black-Eyed Susan Stakes, the featured event May 14 at Pimlico Race Course. The Black-Eyed Susan Stakes is considered by many to be the de facto second leg of the "Filly Triple Crown." Yearly Report rated just off a very soft pace and then made her move on the far turn and drew away to win. With Bailey in the irons, California-bred Yearly Report went off as the odds-on choice of eight stakes winners in the 1-1/8 mile test for three year-old fillies. "It wasn't easy, but she doesn't know how to quit. This was the filly version of the Preakness, and we will take it as a big win. There is no question she likes to respond to a challenge. They can run up to her, but it's not easy to go by her," Bailey added.

Later that year, Yearly Report won the state-bred Melair Stakes at Santa Anita Park and then was fourth on a sloppy track in the Alabama Stakes on dirt at 1-1/4 miles (9 furlongs) at Saratoga Race Course.

In October 2003, she lost by a nose to Dream of Summer in the $150,000 California Cup Matron at Oak Tree at Santa Anita Park.

== Retirement ==
While training for the $500,000 Sunshine Millions Distaff at Santa Anita on January 29, 2004, Yearly Report had a setback, suffering a minor ankle ailment that caused her to miss the La Brea Stakes in December. She was retired in February 2004 and booked stallion Gone West in her first year of breeding.
