= Abermaid =

Irish-bred Thoroughbred racehorse

- Sire: Abernant
- Grandsire: Owen Tudor
- Dam: Dairymaid
- Damsire: Denturius
- Sex: Mare
- Foaled: 1959
- Country: Ireland
- Colour: Grey
- Breeder: Sir Percy Loraine and Roderic More O'Ferrall
- Owner: Sir Percy Loraine; Roderic More O'Ferrall
- Trainer: Harry Wragg
- Record: 8: 4-1-2

Major wins
- New Stakes (1961); 1000 Guineas (1962)

Abermaid (1959–December 1979) was an Irish-bred, British-trained Thoroughbred racehorse and broodmare who won the classic 1000 Guineas in 1962. In a racing career lasting from the spring of 1961 until July 1962, the filly ran eight times and won four races. As a two-year-old in 1961, Abermaid was unbeaten in three races including the New Stakes at Royal Ascot. After running poorly on her three-year-old debut she recorded an upset win in the 1000 Guineas at Newmarket Racecourse in May. She was placed in her three remaining races before being retired to stud where she had some success as a broodmare.

== Background ==
Abermaid was a grey mare bred at the Kildangan stud in County Kildare, Ireland by the partnership Sir Percy Loraine and Roderic More O'Ferrall. She was the only British classic winner sired by the outstanding sprinter Abernant, from whom she inherited her grey colour. Her dam, Dairymaid won three races as a two-year-old but then developed temperament problems and refused to race in her two subsequent starts. As a descendant of the broodmare Laitron, she was closely related to the Prix de l'Arc de Triomphe winner Oroso and the Timeform Gold Cup winner Miralgo.

Abermaid originally raced in the colours of Percy Loraine and was sent into training with the former champion jockey Harry Wragg at his Abington Place stable in Newmarket, Suffolk.

== Racing career ==
=== 1961: two-year-old season ===
Abermaid began her racing career at Newmarket in the spring of 1961 when she won Granby Stakes. In May, at York, she recorded a second success in the Zetland Stakes (not the current race of the same name). She was then moved up in class to run at Royal Ascot in June, where she was matched against colts in the New Stakes (now the Group Two Norfolk Stakes. Ridden by Lester Piggott, she won at odds of 3/1 from the colt Princely Strath. Abermaid did not run again in 1961 and at the end of the year she was given a rating of 118 in the official ratings, fifteen pounds below the top-rated La Tendresse. When Loraine died in 1961, full ownership of the filly passed to Roderic More O'Ferrall and she raced in his colours from then on.

=== 1962: three-year-old season ===
Abermaid made her first appearance for almost ten months in the Free Handicap over seven furlongs at Newmarket in April. She finished unplaced after being badly hampered at the start. At the next Newmarket meeting, Abermaid started a 100/6 outsider in a field of fourteen fillies for the 1000 Guineas over the Rowley mile course. Ridden by the Australian jockey Bill Williamson she stayed on strongly to win by half a length from Display and West Side Story. The result was only confirmed after an objection to Abermaid on the grounds of interference was overruled.

As the daughter of a sprinter, Abermaid was never considered as a contender for The Oaks, and ran instead in the Irish 1000 Guineas at the Curragh. She started favourite but finished third behind Shandon Belle and Lovely Gale. In June, Abermaid returned to Royal Ascot for the second year when she ran in the seven furlong Jersey Stakes. She finished second, beaten half a length by the colt Catchpole. On her final appearance she finished third to Tournella in the Falmouth Stakes at Newmarket in July.

== Retirement ==
Abermaid's first foal was a colt sired by Sicambre named Great Host who won the Ballysax Stakes, Chester Vase and Great Voltigeur Stakes in 1967. None of her other foals were successful racehorses, but her daughter Hunting Box (by Quadrangle) was exported to Japan where she produced the Satsuki Sho winner Azuma Hunter. Abermaid died in December 1979.

== Assessment and honours ==
In their book, A Century of Champions, based on the Timeform rating system, John Randall and Tony Morris rated Abermaid an "average" winner of the 1000 Guineas.

== Pedigree ==
Pedigree of Abermaid (IRE), grey mare, 1959
Sire Abernant (GB) 1946	Owen Tudor; 1938	Hyperion	Gainsborough
Sire Abernant (GB) 1946	Owen Tudor; 1938	Hyperion	Selene
Sire Abernant (GB) 1946	Owen Tudor; 1938	Mary Tudor	Pharos
Sire Abernant (GB) 1946	Owen Tudor; 1938	Mary Tudor	Anna Bolena
Sire Abernant (GB) 1946	Rustom Mahal; 1934	Rustom Pasha	Son-in-Law
Sire Abernant (GB) 1946	Rustom Mahal; 1934	Rustom Pasha	Cos
Sire Abernant (GB) 1946	Rustom Mahal; 1934	Mumtaz Mahal	The Tetrarch
Sire Abernant (GB) 1946	Rustom Mahal; 1934	Mumtaz Mahal	Lady Josephine
Dam Dairymaid (USA) 1947	Denturius; 1937	Gold Bridge	Golden Boss
Dam Dairymaid (USA) 1947	Denturius; 1937	Gold Bridge	Flying Diadem
Dam Dairymaid (USA) 1947	Denturius; 1937	La Solfatara	Lemberg
Dam Dairymaid (USA) 1947	Denturius; 1937	La Solfatara	Ayesha
Dam Dairymaid (USA) 1947	Laitron; 1932	Soldennis	Tredennis
Dam Dairymaid (USA) 1947	Laitron; 1932	Soldennis	Soligena
Dam Dairymaid (USA) 1947	Laitron; 1932	Chardon	Aldford
Dam Dairymaid (USA) 1947	Laitron; 1932	Chardon	Thistle (Family:12-g)
