= Intermezzo (horse) =

British-bred Thoroughbred racehorse

- Sire: Hornbeam
- Grandsire: Hyperion
- Dam: Plaza
- Damsire: Persian Gulf
- Sex: Stallion
- Foaled: 1966
- Country: United Kingdom
- Colour: Bay
- Breeder: Gerald Oldham
- Owner: Gerald Oldham
- Trainer: Harry Wragg
- Record: 11:3-3-1

Major wins
- Great Voltigeur Stakes (1969, disqualified); St. Leger Stakes (1969)

Intermezzo (1966 – after 2 February 1995), was a British Thoroughbred racehorse and sire. He won two of his three races as a two-year-old in 1968 and went on to record his most important win in the Classic St. Leger Stakes at Doncaster in September 1969. He raced without winning in 1970 and was exported to stand as stallion in Japan, where he had some success as a sire of winners.

== Background ==
Intermezzo was a bay horse bred in by his owner Gerald Oldham. He was sired by Hornbeam, a successful racehorse over extended distance who became the damsire of three Derby winners: Blakeney, Morston and Troy. His dam, Plaza, won several rces for Oldham, who had bought her for 2,400 guineas. As a descendant of the broodmare Rattlewings, Intermezzo was a member of the Thoroughbred Family 13-e, which has produced several important winners including Kayf Tara, Opera House and Hever Golf Rose. Oldham sent the colt to be trained in Newmarket by Harry Wragg at his Abington Place stable.

== Racing career ==
=== 1968: two-year-old season ===
Intermezzo made his first racecourse appearance at Newmarket in July when he won the Norfolk Stakes over seven furlongs. In September, he was sent to Newcastle Racecourse for the Wills Goblet Stakes and won impressively by four lengths. In October, he traveled to Doncaster for the Observer Gold Cup, one of the season's most important and valuable races for two-year-olds. He started favourite, but finished second, beaten one and a half lengths by The Elk.

=== 1969: three-year-old season ===
Intermezzo made his first appearance of the year at York Racecourse, where he contested the Dante Stakes, an important trial race for The Derby. He appeared unsuited by the heavy ground and finished fourth beaten more than twenty lengths behind Activator. In the Derby Intermezzo started at odds of 15/1 and finished eighth of the twenty-six runners behind Blakeney, having been unable to obtain a clear run until the closing stages. Intermezzo was forced to miss a run in the Irish Derby after being affected by the "coughing epidemic" which struck many British stables in the summer.

In August, Intermezzo returned to York for the Great Voltigeur Stakes in which he was ridden by the Australian jockey Ron Hutchinson. Intermezzo was boxed against the rail in the straight and although Hutchinson forced his way through to cross the line in first place he was disqualified by the racecourse stewards and relegated to fourth. In the St Leger, Intermezzo and Hutchinson started at odds of 7/1 in a field of eleven runners, with the Lester Piggott-ridden Ribofilio being made favourite. The race was threatened with a boycott by bookmakers who were unhappy at being forced to conduct their business in a new indoor betting hall. Intermezzo's stable companion Totalgo set a strong pace before dropping away in the straight. Two furlongs from the finish, Intermezzo took the lead and opened up a four length lead as Piggott switched Ribofilio to the wide outside. At the line, Intermezzo held off the late run of Ribofilio to win by one and a half lengths, with Blakeney in fifth. Ribofilio's second place meant that he had been the beaten favourite in all three legs of the Triple Crown.

=== 1970: four-year-old season ===
Intermezzo failed to win in four starts in 1970, but was placed on three occasions. He ran second in the Aston Park Stakes to High Line and then finished runner-up to the Washington, D.C. International winner Karabas in the Hardwicke Stakes at Royal Ascot. After finishing third to High Line in the Geoffrey Freer Stakes he ran unplaced on his final appearance in the Grosser Preis von Baden.

== Stud career ==
In autumn 1970, Intermezzo was sold and exported to stand at stud in Japan. He had some success, notably siring Green Grass who won the Arima Kinen, the Tenno Sho (Spring) and the Kikuka Shō (Japanese St. Leger) and was voted Japanese Horse of the Year in 1979. He was also the damsire of Sakura Star O who won the Satsuki Shō (Japanese 2000 Guineas) and the Kikuka Shō, Super Creek who won the Kikuka-shō and the Tennō Shō (Autumn, Spring). According to one source Intermezzo was retired from stud duty in 1991. He was "put out of stud" in Japan on 2 February 1995.

== Pedigree ==
Pedigree of Intermezzo (GB), bay stallion, 1966
Sire Hornbeam (GB) 1953	Hyperion; 1930	Gainsborough	Bayardo
Sire Hornbeam (GB) 1953	Hyperion; 1930	Gainsborough	Rosedrop
Sire Hornbeam (GB) 1953	Hyperion; 1930	Selene	Chaucer
Sire Hornbeam (GB) 1953	Hyperion; 1930	Selene	Serenissima*
Sire Hornbeam (GB) 1953	Thicket; 1947	Nasrullah	Nearco
Sire Hornbeam (GB) 1953	Thicket; 1947	Nasrullah	Mumtaz Begum
Sire Hornbeam (GB) 1953	Thicket; 1947	Thorn Wood	Bois Roussel
Sire Hornbeam (GB) 1953	Thicket; 1947	Thorn Wood	Point Duty
Dam Plaza (USA) 1958	Persian Gulf; 1940	Bahram	Blandford
Dam Plaza (USA) 1958	Persian Gulf; 1940	Bahram	Friar's Daughter
Dam Plaza (USA) 1958	Persian Gulf; 1940	Double Life	Bachelor's Double
Dam Plaza (USA) 1958	Persian Gulf; 1940	Double Life	Saint Joan
Dam Plaza (USA) 1958	Wild Success; 1949	Niccolo dell'Arca	Coronach
Dam Plaza (USA) 1958	Wild Success; 1949	Niccolo dell'Arca	Nogara
Dam Plaza (USA) 1958	Wild Success; 1949	Lavinia	Bosworth*
Dam Plaza (USA) 1958	Wild Success; 1949	Lavinia	Ann Hathaway (Family: 13-e)

* Intermezzo is inbred 4S x 5D to the mare Serenissima, meaning that she appears fourth generation on the sire side of his pedigree, and fifth generation (via Bosworth) on the dam side of his pedigree.
