= Cum Laude Laurie =

American-bred Thoroughbred racehorse

- Sire: Hail To Reason
- Grandsire: Turn-to
- Dam: Primonetta
- Damsire: Swaps
- Sex: Filly
- Foaled: 1974
- Country: United States
- Colour: Dark Bay/Brown
- Breeder: John W. Galbreath
- Owner: Daniel M. Galbreath
- Trainer: Lou Rondinello
- Record: 25: 8–3–8
- Earnings: US$405,207

Major wins
- Beldame Stakes (1977); Ruffian Handicap (1977); Spinster Stakes (1977); Delaware Oaks (1977); Queens County Handicap (1978)

Cum Laude Laurie (May 25, 1974 – March 16, 1982) was an American Thoroughbred racehorse. Bred and raced by the Galbreath family of Darby Dan Farm, she was a daughter of the Champion sire Hail To Reason and the mare Primonetta, the 1962 American Champion Older Female Horse. Her damsire, Swaps was the 1956 American Horse of the Year and a U.S. Racing Hall of Fame inductee.

Trained by Lou Rondinello and ridden by Ángel Cordero Jr., as a three-year-old, Cum Laude Laurie concluded her campaign with four straight stakes races, all of which were Grade 1 events.

She died after surgery for a mesenteric hernia at the age of 7 years, 9 months. At the time of her death, she was in foal to Foolish Pleasure and was due to foal on May 1, 1982.
