= Primonetta =

American-bred Thoroughbred racehorse

- Sire: Swaps
- Grandsire: Khaled
- Dam: Banquet Bell
- Damsire: Polynesian
- Sex: Filly
- Foaled: 1958
- Country: United States
- Colour: Chestnut
- Breeder: John W. Galbreath
- Owner: Darby Dan Farm
- Trainer: James P. Conway
- Record: 25: 17-2-2
- Earnings: US$306,690

Major wins
- Marguerite Stakes (1960); Alabama Stakes (1961); Delaware Oaks (1961); Miss Woodford Stakes (1961); Prioress Stakes (1961); Falls City Handicap (1962); Molly Pitcher Handicap (1962); Regret Handicap (1962); Spinster Stakes (1962)

Awards
- American Champion Older Female Horse (1962); Kentucky Broodmare of the Year (1978)

Honours
- Primonetta Stakes at Laurel Park

Primonetta (February 14, 1958 – January 16, 1993) was an American Champion Thoroughbred racehorse.

== Background ==
Bred by John W. Galbreath and raced by his Darby Dan Farm, Primonetta was a full sister to the 1963 Kentucky Derby and Belmont Stakes winner, Chateaugay.

She was conditioned for racing by future Hall of Fame trainer James P. Conway.

Her name is Italian for first little one since she was Swaps' first foal. Primonetta was a chestnut.

== Racing career ==
As a three-year-old in 1961 Primonetta was one of the top fillies in American racing. Undefeated at two, her win in the April 12th Prioress Stakes was her sixth straight career win without a defeat. Among her other victories that year, she won the Delaware Oaks on July 16 for her ninth win without a loss then suffered her first loss on Jul 23, 1961 in the Monmouth Oaks. She rebounded to beat the great Bowl of Flowers by more than five lengths in her winning effort in the Alabama Stakes.

Primonetta continued her winning ways at age four, setting a new stakes record in capturing the Spinster Stakes and equaled the Monmouth Park track record in winning the Regret Handicap. Primonetta closed out her racing career with a victory in the November 4, 1962 running of the Falls City Handicap. At the end of the year she was voted the 1962 American Champion Older Female Horse.

== Retirement ==
Retired from racing, Primonetta served broodmare duty at Darby Dan Farm. Of her five foals, the best runner was Darby Dan Farm's Cum Laude Laurie, a daughter by Hail To Reason. In 1978, Primonetta earned Kentucky Broodmare of the Year honors.

Primonetta died of a heart attack on January 16, 1993, at Darby Dan Farm, less than a month before her thirty-fifth birthday. She is recognized as one of the longest-lived thoroughbred racehorses ever, and is the third longest-lived filly known to horse racing after Stay Out Front (February 28, 1966 – December 15, 2001), who lived to 35 years and 9 1/2 months and Heartake (May 22, 1973 – April 8, 2009), who lived to 35 years and 10 1/2 months.

== Pedigree ==
Pedigree of Primonetta
Sire Swaps	Khaled	Hyperion	Gainsborough
Sire Swaps	Khaled	Hyperion	Selene
Sire Swaps	Khaled	Eclair	Ethnarch
Sire Swaps	Khaled	Eclair	Black Ray
Sire Swaps	Iron Reward	Beau Pere	Son-in-Law
Sire Swaps	Iron Reward	Beau Pere	Cinna
Sire Swaps	Iron Reward	Iron Maiden	War Admiral
Sire Swaps	Iron Reward	Iron Maiden	Betty Derr
Dam Banquet Bell	Polynesian	Unbreakable	Sickle
Dam Banquet Bell	Polynesian	Unbreakable	Blue Grass
Dam Banquet Bell	Polynesian	Black Polly	Polymelian
Dam Banquet Bell	Polynesian	Black Polly	Black Queen
Dam Banquet Bell	Dinner Horn	Pot Au Feu	Bruleur
Dam Banquet Bell	Dinner Horn	Pot Au Feu	Polly Peachum
Dam Banquet Bell	Dinner Horn	Tophorn	Bull Dog
Dam Banquet Bell	Dinner Horn	Tophorn	Leghorn
