= Primonetta Stakes =

- Class: Ungraded Stakes
- Location: Pimlico Race Course, Baltimore, Maryland, United States
- Inaugurated: 1988
- Race type: Thoroughbred - Flat racing
- Website: www.pimlico.com/horsemen/stakes-schedule/primonetta-stakes

Race information
- Distance: 6 furlongs
- Surface: Dirt
- Track: left-handed
- Qualification: Fillies & Mares, Three-years-old & up
- Purse: $95,000

The Primonetta Stakes is an American Thoroughbred horse race held annually in April at either Pimlico Race Course in Baltimore, Maryland or Laurel Park in Laurel, Maryland. The Primonetta Stakes is open to fillies and mares three years old and up and is raced at six furlongs on the dirt.

The race was named for Primonetta, the 1962 American Champion Older Female Horse.

== Records ==
Speed record:

- 6 furlongs - 1:10.67 - Bold Affair (2012)

Most wins by a jockey:

- 3 - Abel Castellano (2011, 2012 & 2013)

Most wins by a trainer:

- 2 - Howard Wolfendale (2012 & 2013)

Most wins by an owner:

- 2 - Charles Reed/Michael Zanella (2012 & 2013)

== Winners of the Primonetta Stakes ==
Year	Winner	Age	Jockey	Trainer	Owner	Dist.	Time	Purse
2017	Absatootly	4	Kevin Gomez	Charlton Baker	Newman Racing	6 fur.	1:11.00	$100,000
2016	Lady Sabelia	7	Horacio Karamanos	Robin L. Graham	Mrs. Frank P. Wright	6 fur.	1:10.84	$75,000
2015	Galiana	5	Abel Lezcano	Rodolfo Romero	Triple R Stable	6 fur.	1:11.27	$100,000
2014	Winning Image	7	Tony Black	Michael Aro	Martin Scafidi	6 fur.	1:12.16	$100,000
2013	Bold Affair	5	Abel Castellano	Howard Wolfendale	C.Reed/M.Zanella	6 fur.	1:12.19	$95,000
2012	Bold Affair	4	Abel Castellano	Howard Wolfendale	C.Reed/M.Zanella	6 fur.	1:10.67	$75,000
2011	Miss Fleetfoot	6	Abel Castellano	Phil Schoenthal	Ghost Ridge Farms	6 fur.	1:12.02	$75,000
2010	All Giving	6	Horacio Karamanos	Flint W. Stites	Catherine J. Smith, et al.	6 fur.	1:09.55	$70,000
2009	Access Fee (DH)	4	Luis Garcia	Lawrence E. Murray	Sondra D. Bender	6 fur.	1:09.70	$50,000
2009	Cammy's Choice (DH)	5	Julian Pimentel	Edward Lehman	Rhodyo Stable, Inc.	6 fur.	1:09.70	$50,000
2008	Hungarian Boatbaby	4	Abel Castellano	Anthony W. Dutrow	The Elkstone Group	6 fur.	1:11.90	$63,400
2007	My Sister Sue	4	Katie Lee	Flint W. Stites	Aracrest Racing Stables LLC	6 fur.	1:10.60	$50,000
2006	Flame of Love	-	J. Z. Santana	Scott A. Lake	McCarty Racing	6 fur.	1:11.20	$60,000
2005	Forest Music	-	Roberto Alvarado, Jr.	Mark Shuman	Michael Gill	6 fur.	1:10.50	$50,000
2004	Umpateedle	-	Ramon Dominguez	Mark Shuman	Michael Gill	6 fur.	1:11.00	$50,000
2003	Balmy	-	Ramon Dominguez	John Servis	Fox Hill Farms, Inc.	6 fur.	1:10.80	$50,000
2002	Arianna's Passion	-	Harry Vega	Walter Reece	Noreen Carpenito	6 fur.	1:11.40	$50,000
2001	Lily's Affair	-	Jose A. Velez, Jr.	Michael Gorham	Double A. Partnership	6 fur.	1:09.80	$75,000
2000	Rangely Lady	-	Rick Wilson	Anthony Dutrow	Larry N. Brafman	6 fur.	1:13.20	$75,000
1999	Valay Bullet	-	Greg Hutton	John J. Robb	Hal C. B. Clagget	6 fur.	1:11.20	$50,000
1998	Blue Begonia	-	Aaron Gryder	Joseph Orseno	Frank Stronach	6 fur.	1:10.40	$55,000
1997	Secret Prospect	-	Carlos H. Marquez	John Tammaro	Conover Stable (Robert & Faith Hahn)	6 fur.	1:12.40	$55,000
1996	Valid Goddess	-	Joe Rocco	Michael Petro	Sunnymeade Farm, Inc.	6 fur.	1:10.60	$55,000
1995	Mixed Appeal	-	C. Omar Klinger	Dean Gaudet	Israel Cohen	6 fur.	1:11.60	$50,000
1994	Lea Carter	-	Mario Pino	William Turner	Milton Ritzenberg	6 fur.	1:11.80	$55,000
1993	Mixed Apeal	-	Clarence J. Ladner	Dean Gaudet	Israel Cohen	6 fur.	1:12.00	$55,000
1992	Silver Tango	-	Mike Luzzi	Gary Capuano	Constance A. Capuano	6 fur.	1:11.80	$45,000
1991	In the Curl	-	Mike Luzzi	Dale Capuano	Nick Ranaldi	6 fur.	1:10.60	$45,000
1990	Cojinx	-	Marco Castaneda	Carlos A. Garcia	Roy D. Gottlieb	6 fur.	1:11.20	$45,000
1989	In the Curl	-	Donnie Miller	Dale Capuano	Nick Ranaldi	6 fur.	1:11.40	$55,000
1988	Kerygma	-	Allen T. Stacy	Barclay Tagg	D. Earl Pardue	6 fur.	1:11.40	$45,000

== See also ==
- Primonetta Stakes top three finishers and starters
