= Abernant (horse) =

British-bred Thoroughbred racehorse (1972–1996)

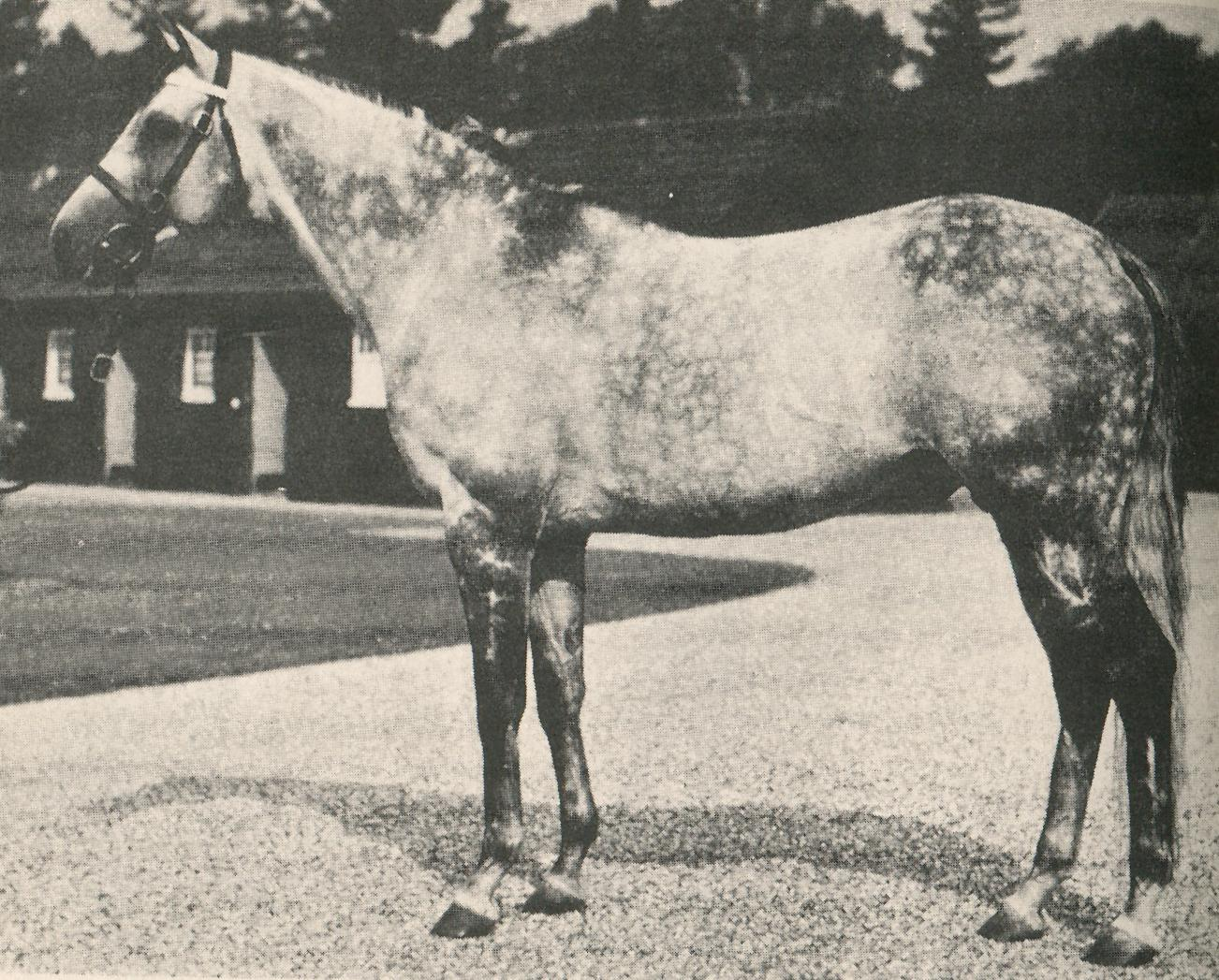
- Sire: Owen Tudor
- Grandsire: Hyperion
- Dam: Rustom Mahal (FR)
- Damsire: Rustom Pasha
- Sex: Stallion
- Foaled: 1946
- Country: Great Britain
- Colour: Grey
- Breeder: Catherine Macdonald-Buchanan
- Owner: Reginald Macdonald-Buchanan
- Trainer: Noel Murless
- Record: 17: 14-2-0
- Earnings: £26,394

Major wins
- Chesham Stakes (1948); Middle Park Stakes (1948); Champagne Stakes (1948); National Breeders' Produce Stakes (1948); King's Stand Stakes (1949); July Cup (1949, 1950); Nunthorpe Stakes (1949, 1950); King George Stakes (1949, 1950)

Awards
- Timeform top-rated two-year-old colt (1948); Timeform top-rated three-year-old colt (1949); Timeform top-rated older male (1950); Timeform top-rated horse (1949, 1950); Timeform rating: 142

Honours
- Abernant Stakes at Newmarket Racecourse
- Last updated on 5 March 2025

Abernant (1946–1970) was a British Thoroughbred racehorse and sire. In a career which lasted from May 1948 until 1950, he ran 17 times and won 14 races. He was the best British two-year-old of 1948 and returned from a narrow defeat in the 2000 Guineas to become the dominant sprinter in Britain in 1949 and 1950. Abernant's Timeform rating is the highest for a sprinter in Europe since World War II. He sired the winners of over 1,000 races.

== Background ==
Abernant was a dark-grey horse bred by Catherine Macdonald-Buchanan and raced in the colours of her husband Reginald Macdonald-Buchanan. He was sired by the Epsom Derby winner Owen Tudor, by Hyperion, a son of the English Triple Crown winner, Gainsborough. Abernant's dam, Rustam Mahal, was a non-winning daughter of Rustom Pasha and the very important broodmare Mumtaz Mahal who in turn was sired by The Tetrarch. Abernant was a half brother to Kurdistan (by Tehran) who was a successful sire in New Zealand, siring among others, Baghdad Note, a winner of the Melbourne Cup. horse during his racing career although like all grey horses, his coat lightened as he aged. Abernant was sent into training with Noel Murless at Beckhampton in Wiltshire.

== Racing record ==
=== 1948: two-year-old season ===
Abernant was beaten on his debut in a race at Lingfield, but won his remaining five races in 1948. He won the Chesham Stakes at Royal Ascot, the National Breeders' Produce Stakes at Sandown, the Champagne Stakes at Doncaster (beating Nimbus by six lengths) and the Middle Park Stakes at Newmarket. His only serious challenge came in the National Stakes in which he had to be ridden out by Richards to beat Star King.

At the end of the year, he was rated the best British two-year-old in the Free Handicap. Timeform Annual of 1948 Stated “has terrific speed: runs very freely and although in each of his last 2 races he did not appear to have anything left in him at the finish: top class racehorse.” Timeform rated Abernant at 133 as a two-year-old.

=== 1949: three-year-old season ===
On his first appearance as a three-year-old, Abernant won over seven furlongs at Bath and was then moved up to one mile to contest the one mile 2000 Guineas at Newmarket. He started favourite at odds of 5/9 and led from the start under Gordon Richards. In the closing stages his stamina failed and he was caught and beaten a short head by Nimbus in the closest finish in the race's history. Following his defeat at Newmarket, Abernant reverted to sprint distances and went through the rest of the season unbeaten. His wins included the King's Stand Stakes, the July Cup, the King George Stakes and the Nunthorpe Stakes. In the Nunthorpe he won by five lengths despite only taking the lead inside the final furlong.

=== 1950: four-year-old season ===
At age four in 1950, he was beaten in the King's Stand Stakes, when he failed to concede twenty-three pounds to the three-year-old Tangle. He won the Lubbock Sprint Stakes at Sandown Park Racecourse, to give Richards his 4000th winner. He repeated as the easy winner of the July Cup, the Nunthorpe Stakes and the King George Stakes. He ended his career that year with fourteen wins from the seventeen races he entered. On Abernant's retirement, Murless said that "there is nothing left for him to win".

== Assessment ==
Abernant's Timeform rating of 142 equals that of Ribot as the fourth-best ever awarded. In the years that followed his retirement, among the many accolades, The Independent newspaper wrote that Abernant "was the best sprinter ever to grace a racecourse." Timeform rated Abernant the best horse of his generation in Europe at ages two, three and four. He was the joint-highest rated horse of 1949 (with the stayer Alycidon) and the highest-rated horse of 1950.

In their book A Century of Champions, John Randall and Tony Morris rated Abernant the best British sprinter of the century and the no. 20 horse in their global ranking.

Gordon Richards described Abernant as the fastest horse he ever rode.

== Stud record ==
Abernant sired the winners of over 1,000 races, including Abermaid (1962 1,000 Guineas Stakes), Even Star (Irish 1,000 Guineas), Welsh Rake (1963 Queen Anne Stakes), Zahedan (1965 National Stakes) and Thin Ice (Sanford Stakes).

He died in 1970 at age twenty-four and is buried at Egerton Stud in Newmarket. In an interview with trainer Mark Tompkins, Julie Murless, the daughter of Abernant's trainer, recalled that the gentle horse loved children and as a child of five she would sit on his back.

== Sire line tree ==
- Abernant
  - Thin Ice
  - Aberli
  - Welsh Rake
  - Abgar
    - Carlsberg
  - Zahedan

== Pedigree ==
Pedigree of Abernant, grey stallion, 1946
Sire Owen Tudor 1938	Hyperion; Ch. 1930	Gainsborough	Bayardo
Sire Owen Tudor 1938	Hyperion; Ch. 1930	Gainsborough	Rosedrop
Sire Owen Tudor 1938	Hyperion; Ch. 1930	Selene	Chaucer*
Sire Owen Tudor 1938	Hyperion; Ch. 1930	Selene	Serenissima
Sire Owen Tudor 1938	Mary Tudor; 1931	Pharos	Phalaris
Sire Owen Tudor 1938	Mary Tudor; 1931	Pharos	Scapa Flow*
Sire Owen Tudor 1938	Mary Tudor; 1931	Anna Bolena	Teddy
Sire Owen Tudor 1938	Mary Tudor; 1931	Anna Bolena	Queen Elizabeth
Dam Rustom Mahal 1934	Rustom Pasha; 1927	Son-in-Law	Dark Ronald
Dam Rustom Mahal 1934	Rustom Pasha; 1927	Son-in-Law	Mother in Law
Dam Rustom Mahal 1934	Rustom Pasha; 1927	Cos	Flying Orb
Dam Rustom Mahal 1934	Rustom Pasha; 1927	Cos	Renaissance
Dam Rustom Mahal 1934	Mumtaz Mahal; Gr. 1921	The Tetrarch	Roi Herode
Dam Rustom Mahal 1934	Mumtaz Mahal; Gr. 1921	The Tetrarch	Vahren
Dam Rustom Mahal 1934	Mumtaz Mahal; Gr. 1921	Lady Josephine	Sundridge
Dam Rustom Mahal 1934	Mumtaz Mahal; Gr. 1921	Lady Josephine	Americus Girl (Family: 9-c)

* Abernant is inbred 4S x 5S to the stallion Chaucer, meaning that he appears fourth generation and fifth generation (via Scapa Flow) on the sire side of his pedigree.
