= Primonetta Stakes top three finishers and starters =

This is a listing of the horses that finished in either first, second, or third place and the number of starters in the Primonetta Stakes, an American stakes race for fillies and mares three years old and older at six furlongs (6 furlongs) on the dirt at Pimlico Race Course in Baltimore, Maryland. (List 2011–present)

Year	Winner	Second	Third	Starters
2017	Absatootly	Lovable Lady	Next Best Thing	9
2016	Lady Sabelia	Disco Chick	Sweet on Smokey	8
2015	Galiana	She's Ordained	Tarnished	9
2014	Winning Image	Do Somethin	Red’s Round Table	9
2013	Bold Affair	Irish Exchange	Scrumdiddlyumptious	9
2012	Bold Affair	Aquitania	Enchante	7
2011	Miss Fleetfoot	Wind Caper	Tough Talkin Lady	7
2010	All Giving	Streetscape	What Time It Is	n/a
2009	Cammy's Choice	Access Fee	All Giving	n/a
2008	Hungarian Boatbaby	Circuit Breaker	What Time It Is	n/a
2007	My Sister Sue	Homesteader	Coli Bear	n/a
2006	Flame of Love	Jet Set Citi	Smoking Wise	n/a
2005	Forest Music	Spirited Game	Gelli	n/a
2004	Umpateedle	Balmy	Bronze Abe	n/a
2003	Balmy	Darnestown	Hunka Hunka Lori Z	n/a
2002	Arianna's Passion	Lip Sing's Affair	Kimbralata	n/a
2001	Lily's Affair	Sincerely	Lucky Livi	n/a
2000	Rangeley Lady	Exclusive Eskimo	Northern Mist	n/a
1999	Valay Bullet	Mz. Ann	Sam's Sunny Halo	n/a
1998	Blue Begonia	Citi Sounds	Weather Vane	n/a
1997	Secret Prospect	Conradley	Silent Greeting	n/a
1996	Valid Goddess	Broad Smile	Word o'Ransom	n/a
1995	Mixed Appeal	Up an Eighth	Inductive	n/a
1994	Lea Carter	Mixed Appeal	Code Blum	n/a
1993	Mixed Appeal	Singing Ring	Tripp Trial	n/a
1992	Silver Tango	Mixed Appeal	Absolutely Great	n/a
1991	In the Curl	Hero's Hurrah	Iceycindy	n/a
1990	Cojinx	Run Spot	Big Bozo	n/a
1989	In the Curl	Kerygma	Cut Ice	n/a
1988	Kerygma	In the Curl	Zigbelle	n/a

== See also ==
- Primonetta Stakes
- List of graded stakes at Pimlico Race Course
