= Godolphin Stables =

Horse racing stable in Newmarket, Suffolk, England

Coordinates: 52.257°N 0.412°E

- Industry: Horse racing
- Founder: Frederick Stanley, 16th Earl of Derby
- Headquarters: Newmarket, United Kingdom
- Key people: Sheikh Mohammed bin Rashid Al Maktoum (owner); Saeed bin Suroor (trainer); Charlie Appleby (trainer)

Godolphin Stables, also known as Stanley House Stables, is a thoroughbred racehorse ownership, training and breeding operation in Newmarket, Suffolk, which has produced many notable horses. It is one of the most famous racing establishments in the world and is currently owned and operated by Godolphin Racing, the UK's largest flat racing operation.

== History and ownership ==
The stables were built by Frederick Stanley, 16th Earl of Derby (also the namesake of the Stanley Cup in North American ice hockey), in 1903 and originally named Stanley House stables after Lord Derby's nearby house. In 1933, Walter Earl took over the yard and won the 1942 Derby with Watling Street. In 1976, the stables were sold to Gavin Pritchard Gordon, before being acquired by Sheikh Mohammed bin Rashid Al Maktoum for his Godolphin Racing operation in April 1988, thereby being renamed Godolphin Stables under head trainer John Gosden. The name refers to the well known horse Godolphin Arabian, one of the first Arabian horses brought to Britain.

The stables were involved in a 2013 investigation by the British Horseracing Authority into the conduct of trainer Mahmood Al Zarooni. The stables now serve as a base for Godolphin's British operations, led by trainer Saeed Bin Suroor.

== Facilities ==
The yard can hold 115 horses, and has a number of leading facilities including private grass and all-weather gallops, a swimming pool, Seawalker and Equine spas.

== Group 1 winners ==
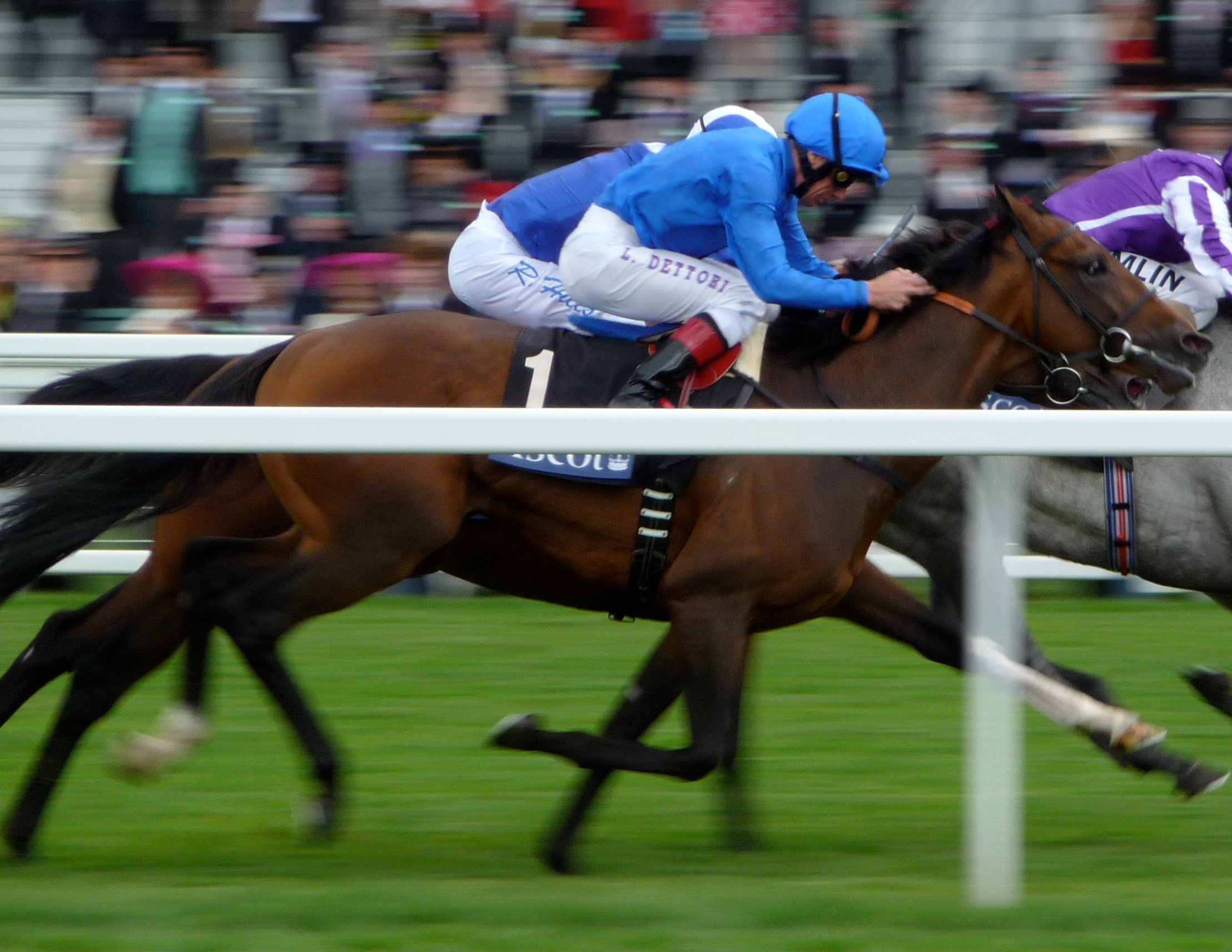
Mastery

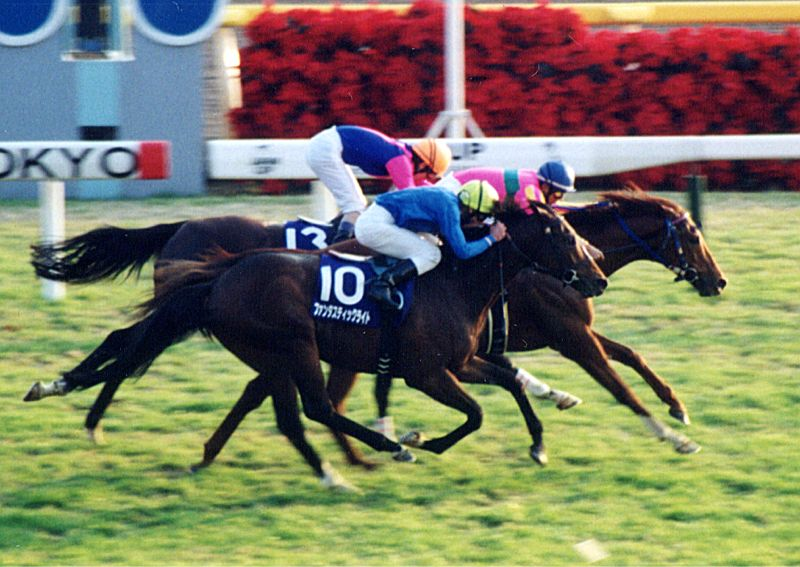
Fantastic Light

Horses trained at the stables that have won Group 1 races include:

- Swynford, winner of the 1910 St. Leger
- Sansovino, winner of the 1924 Derby
- Colorado, winner of the 1926 2,000 Guineas
- Fairway, winner of the 1928 St. Leger
- Hyperion, winner of the 1933 Derby
- Quashed, winner of the 1935 Epsom Oaks
- Tide-way, winner of the 1936 1,000 Guineas
- Watling Street, winner of the 1942 Derby
- Alycidon, winner of the 1949 Ascot Gold Cup
- Shamardal, winner of the 2004 Dewhurst Stakes and 2005 Poule d'Essai des Poulains, Prix du Jockey Club and St James's Palace Stakes
- Dubawi, winner of the 2004 National Stakes and 2005 Irish 2,000 Guineas and Prix Jacques Le Marois
- Ibn Khaldun, winner of the 2007 Futurity Trophy
- Creachadoir, winner of the 2008 Lockinge Stakes
- Cherry Mix, winner of the 2006 Grosser Preis von Bayern
- Fantastic Light, winner of the 2000 Dubai Sheema Classic, Man o' War Stakes, Hong Kong Cup and 2001 Tattersalls Gold Cup, Prince of Wales's Stakes, Irish Champion Stakes, Breeders' Cup Turf
- Mastery, winner of the 2009 St Leger Stakes and 2010 Hong Kong Vase
- Ramonti, winner of the 2007 Queen Anne Stakes, Sussex Stakes, Queen Elizabeth II Stakes, Hong Kong Cup
