= Nimbus (horse) =

Nimbus is the name given to seven different Thoroughbred racehorses as of 2007.

- Nimbus (French horse), French racehorse, foaled in 1910
- Nimbus (British horse), English racehorse and Epsom Derby winner, foaled in 1946
- Nimbus (USA), foaled 1930, 2nd in the 1933 Belmont Stakes
