= Regret Stakes (Monmouth Park) =

- Class: Ungraded stakes
- Location: Monmouth Park Racetrack, Oceanport, New Jersey; United States
- Inaugurated: 1949
- Race type: Thoroughbred - Flat racing
- Website: www.monmouthpark.com

Race information
- Distance: 6 furlongs
- Surface: Dirt
- Track: left-handed
- Qualification: Filles and Mares, three-years-old & up

The Regret Stakes is an American Thoroughbred horse race run annually at Monmouth Park Racetrack in Oceanport, New Jersey. First run in 1949, it is open to fillies and mares, age three and older. It is contested on dirt at a distance of six furlongs.

Prominent earlier winners include Primonetta (1962), Ta Wee (1970), Candy Éclair (1980), and Lady's Secret (1985).

== Records ==
Speed record:

- 1:08.37 - Stonetastic (2016)

Most wins:

- 2 - Cinda (1952, 1953)
- 2 - Geeky Gorgeous (2013, 2014)
- 2 - Bronx Beauty (2019, 2020)

Most wins by a jockey:

- 4 - Paco Lopez (2016, 2018, 2019, 2022)

Most wins by a trainer:

- 2 - Anthony Margotta Jr. (2019, 2020)
- 2 - Daniel J. Lopez (2013, 2014)

Most wins by an owner:

- ? -

== Winners since 2000 ==
Year	Winner	Age	Jockey	Trainer	Owner	Dist. (Furlongs)	Time
2025	Factorbella	4	Sonny Leon	Tony Wilson	Happy Tenth Stable	6 f	1:09.64
2024	Reclusive	5	Chris Elliott	Tina Hurley	Century Acres Farm	6 f	1:10.76
2023	My Beautiful Belle	5	Jomar Torres	Chuck Spina	Ioia, Joseph, Ioia, Gayle and Spina, Chuck	6 f	1:09.89
2022	Edie Meeny Miny Mo	4	Paco Lopez	Michelle Hemingway	Holly Hill Stables	6 f	1:08.43
2021	Honey I'm Good	5	Gerardo Corrales	Steven M. Asmussen	Almost Heaven Stables	6 f	1:09.28
2020	Bronx Beauty	5	Isaac Castillo	Anthony Margotta Jr.	2W Stables (Richard Woll)	6 f	1:10.45
2019	Bronx Beauty	4	Paco Lopez	Anthony Margotta Jr.	2W Stables (Richard Woll)	6 f	1:10.39
2018	Chalon	4	Paco Lopez	Arnaud Delacour	Lael Stable (Roy & Gretchen Jackson)	6 f	1:10.05
2017	Disco Chick	6	Hector Caballero	Miguel Penaloza	Freedom Racing (Yaroslaw "Jerry" Kolybabiuk)	6 f	1:09.69
2016	Stonetastic	5	Paco Lopez	Kelly J. Breen	Stoneway Farm (James L. Stone)	6 f	1:08.37
2015	Room For Me	5	Daniel Centeno	David Jacobson	David Jacobson	6 f	1:09.20
2014	Geeky Gorgeous	5	Angel Serpa	Daniel J. Lopez	Daniel J. Lopez	6 f	1:09.67
2013	Geeky Gorgeous	4	Joe Bravo	Daniel J. Lopez	Daniel J. Lopez	6 f	1:11.04
2012	Race not held						
2011	Magical Feeling	5	Roberto Alvarado Jr.	Allen W. Iwinski	Peter E. Blum	6 f	1:08.63
2010	Lady Alexander	4	Carlos H. Marquez Jr.	Bruce F. Alexander	Blue Star Stable	6 f	1:09.92
2009	D'wild Ride	4	Carlos H. Marquez Jr.	Joe Orseno	Silly Goose Racing Stable (Brian & Sandy Miller)	6 f	1:09.52
2008	Hungarian Boatbaby	4	Kent Desormeaux	Tony Dutrow	Elkstone Group LLC	6 f	1:09.62
2007	Oprah Winney	4	Edgar Prado	Rick Dutrow	Mubb Dubb, Sanford Goldfarb, Bunch of Characters Stable	6 f	1:09.35
2006	My Lucky Free	3	Chuck Lopez	Cam Gambolati	Runnin Cardinal Stable (Rick Pitino, et al.) & Charles E. Glasscock	6 f	1:09.15
2005	Areek	4	Jose Velez Jr.	Mark A. Hennig	Shadwell Racing	6 f	1:10.11
2004	Travelator	4	Aaron Gryder	Stanley M. Hough	Our Sugarbear Stable	6 f	1:10.01
2003	Mooji Moo	4	Abdiel Toribio	Timothy A. Hills	Robert Deckert Sr. & Jr.	6 f	1:09.75
2002	To Marquet	5	Tommy Turner	Frank A. Generazio Jr.	Patricia A. Generazio	6 f	1:09.63
2001	Big Bambu	4	Mario Pino	Alan Sobol	Ed Marshall & John Schoonover	6 f	1:08.60
2000	Chilukki	3	Corey Nakatani	Bob Baffert	Stonerside Stable	6 f	1:09.40
