= Sun Stream =

British-bred Thoroughbred racehorse

- Sire: Hyperion
- Grandsire: Gainsborough
- Dam: Drift
- Damsire: Swynford
- Sex: Mare
- Foaled: 1942
- Country: United Kingdom
- Colour: Chestnut
- Breeder: Edward Stanley, 17th Earl of Derby
- Owner: Edward Stanley, 17th Earl of Derby
- Trainer: Walter Earl
- Record: 7: 5–1–1
- Earnings: £15,670

Major wins
- Queen Mary Stakes (1944); 1000 Guineas (1945); Epsom Oaks (1945)

Sun Stream (1942 – January 1959) was a British Thoroughbred racehorse and broodmare, best known for winning two Classics in 1945. The filly won five times from seven races in a track career which lasted from spring 1944 until June 1945. As a two-year-old in 1944 she won three races including the Queen Mary Stakes. After being beaten on her three-year-old debut she won the 1000 Guineas over one mile at Newmarket and a substitute Oaks over one and a half miles at the same course a month later. After her second classic win she was retired to stud, where her record as a broodmare was disappointing.

== Background ==
Sun Stream was a chestnut mare with a white blaze and white hind feet. She was bred, like both her parents by her owner Edward Stanley, 17th Earl of Derby, the seven-time British flat racing Champion Owner. She was sired by Hyperion, who won The Derby and the St Leger Stakes for Lord Derby in 1933 and went on to become an internationally significant sire: Sun Stream's successes enabled Hyperion to claim the fourth of his six sires' championships in 1945. Sun Stream's dam, Drift, won four races including the Atalanta Stakes and became a successful broodmare, producing the 1,000 Guineas winner Tideway and Heliopolis, a full brother to Sun Stream who was twice Leading sire in North America.

Lord Derby sent the filly to his private trainer Walter Earl at his Stanley House stable in Newmarket, Suffolk, where she was looked after by groom Gerry Blum, who later became a trainer.

Sun Stream's racing career took place during World War II during which horse racing in Britain was subject to many restrictions. Several major racecourses, including Epsom, Ascot and Doncaster, were closed for the duration of the conflict, either for safety reasons, or because they were being used by the military. Many important races were rescheduled to new dates and venues, often at short notice, and all five of the Classics were run at Newmarket.

== Racing career ==
=== 1944: two-year-old season ===
As a two-year-old in 1944, Sun Stream was among the best of her generation. She won the Bedford Stakes over five furlongs at Newmarket in spring and then moved up in class for the Queen Mary Stakes in June. The race, traditionally part of the Royal Ascot meeting, was run at Newmarket from 1941 to 1944. Ridden by Harry Wragg, she won the race at odds of 100/30. In autumn, Sun Stream ran in the six furlong Cheveley Park Stakes, Britain's most prestigious race for two-year-old fillies. In a closely contested three-way finish she was beaten into third place by Sweet Cygnet and Neola. She was regarded as one of the best juvenile fillies to race in Britain in 1944.

=== 1945: three-year-old season ===
Sun Stream began her three-year-old season in the seven furlong Upwell Stakes, a now discontinued race which served as a trial for the 1000 Guineas, in which she finished second to Exotic. Two weeks later, on VE Day, Sun Stream started 5/2 favourite for the 1000 Guineas which was moved to the July course from its traditional venue on the Rowley Mile, which was used as an airbase during the war. Ridden by Wragg, she won by three lengths from Blue Smoke, with Mrs Feather a further two lengths back in third. Sun Stream's success gave Lord Derby a seventh win in the race as both owner and breeder, and was very popular with the unusually large crowd.

A month later, Sun Stream returned to the July course on 8 June for the Oaks Stakes. Although the race was not run at Epsom Downs Racecourse it was given its traditional name: wartime runnings at Newmarket had been known as the "New Oaks". The relaxation of wartime restrictions on transport resulted in a huge crowd converging on Newmarket, leading to serious traffic congestion at the course. She started the 6/4 favourite in a field of sixteen fillies. In what was described as "one of the most exciting classic finishes ever contested", Sun Stream won the race by a short head and three quarters of a length from the Aga Khan's Naishapur and Solar Princess. The veteran Harry Wragg was given a great deal of credit for the "mastery" he displayed in the race. She had a particularly hard race in the Oaks and did not compete again.

== Assessment and honours ==
In their book, A Century of Champions, based on the Timeform rating system, John Randall and Tony Morris rated Sun Stream a "superior" winner of the 1000 Guineas and Oaks and the twenty-fifth best filly trained in Britain or Ireland in the 20th century.

== Stud record ==
Sun Stream retired from racing to become a broodmare at her owner's stud. She produced four minor winners, but nothing of top class. Through her daughter Riviera, she was the female ancestor of the Champion Hurdler Collier Bay. Sun Stream was euthanised in January 1959.

== Pedigree ==
Pedigree of Sun Stream (GB), chestnut mare, 1942
Sire Hyperion (GB) 1930	Gainsborough; 1915	Bayardo	Bay Ronald
Sire Hyperion (GB) 1930	Gainsborough; 1915	Bayardo	Galicia
Sire Hyperion (GB) 1930	Gainsborough; 1915	Rosedrop	St. Frusquin
Sire Hyperion (GB) 1930	Gainsborough; 1915	Rosedrop	Rosaline
Sire Hyperion (GB) 1930	Selene; 1919	Chaucer	St. Simon
Sire Hyperion (GB) 1930	Selene; 1919	Chaucer	Canterbury Pilgrim
Sire Hyperion (GB) 1930	Selene; 1919	Serenissima	Minoru
Sire Hyperion (GB) 1930	Selene; 1919	Serenissima	Gondolette
Dam Drift (GB) 1926	Swynford; 1907	John o' Gaunt	Isinglass
Dam Drift (GB) 1926	Swynford; 1907	John o' Gaunt	La Fleche
Dam Drift (GB) 1926	Swynford; 1907	Canterbury Pilgrim	Tristan
Dam Drift (GB) 1926	Swynford; 1907	Canterbury Pilgrim	Pilgrimage
Dam Drift (GB) 1926	Simon's Shoes; 1916	Neil Gow	Marco
Dam Drift (GB) 1926	Simon's Shoes; 1916	Neil Gow	Chelandry
Dam Drift (GB) 1926	Simon's Shoes; 1916	Santa Brigida	St. Simon
Dam Drift (GB) 1926	Simon's Shoes; 1916	Santa Brigida	Bridget (Family No. 8-g)

- Sun Stream was inbred 4 × 4 to St. Simon, meaning that the stallion appears twice in the fourth generation of her pedigree.
