= Greek Money =

American Thoroughbred racehorse

- Sire: Greek Song
- Grandsire: Heliopolis
- Dam: Lucy Lufton
- Damsire: Nimbus
- Sex: Stallion
- Foaled: 1959
- Country: United States
- Colour: Chestnut
- Breeder: Renappi Corporation
- Owner: Brandywine Stable
- Trainer: Virgil W. Raines
- Record: 39: 10-6-2
- Earnings: US$239,433

Major wins
- James H. Connors Memorial Stakes (1961); Chesapeake Stakes (1962); Excelsior Handicap (1963); Pennycomequick Purse (1964); American Triple Crown wins: Preakness Stakes (1962)

Honours
- Greek Money Stakes at Laurel Park

Greek Money (foaled 1959 in Virginia) was an American Thoroughbred racehorse best known for winning the second leg of the U.S. Triple Crown series, the Preakness Stakes.

== Background ==
Greek Money was a chestnut horse sired by Greek Song whose wins included the 1950 Arlington Classic. His dam was English mare Lucy Lufton, a daughter of Nimbus, the 1949 Epsom Derby winner. Greek Money was bred and raced by entities owned by Donald P. Ross, co-owner of Delaware Park Racetrack. He was trained by Buddy Raines.

== Racing career ==
Greek Money had won three of his four starts going into the 1962 Preakness Stakes. Ridden by John Rotz, he defeated Ridan by a nose to win the Preakness. Greek Money was made the betting favorite for the Belmont Stakes but finished seventh to winner Jaipur. After that, he won only an allowance race in his next six starts. In 1963, his most important win of the year came in the Excelsior Handicap at New York's Aqueduct Racetrack. In 1964, Greek Money won the Pennycomequick Purse at Delaware Park Racetrack.

== Stud record ==
As a sire, Greek Money met with limited success.

== Breeding ==
Pedigree of Greek Money
Sire Greek Song ch. 1947	Heliopolis bay 1936	Hyperion	Gainsborough
Sire Greek Song ch. 1947	Heliopolis bay 1936	Hyperion	Selene
Sire Greek Song ch. 1947	Heliopolis bay 1936	Drift	Swynford
Sire Greek Song ch. 1947	Heliopolis bay 1936	Drift	Santa Cruz
Sire Greek Song ch. 1947	Sylvan Song bay 1932	Royal Minstrel	Tetratema
Sire Greek Song ch. 1947	Sylvan Song bay 1932	Royal Minstrel	Harpsichord
Sire Greek Song ch. 1947	Sylvan Song bay 1932	Glade	Touch Me Not
Sire Greek Song ch. 1947	Sylvan Song bay 1932	Glade	Idle Dell
Dam Lucy Lufton ch. 1952	Nimbus bay 1946	Nearco	Pharos
Dam Lucy Lufton ch. 1952	Nimbus bay 1946	Nearco	Nogara
Dam Lucy Lufton ch. 1952	Nimbus bay 1946	Kong	Baytown
Dam Lucy Lufton ch. 1952	Nimbus bay 1946	Kong	Clang
Dam Lucy Lufton ch. 1952	Barchester bay 1944	Umidwar	Blandford
Dam Lucy Lufton ch. 1952	Barchester bay 1944	Umidwar	Uganda
Dam Lucy Lufton ch. 1952	Barchester bay 1944	Belbroughton	King Solomon
Dam Lucy Lufton ch. 1952	Barchester bay 1944	Belbroughton	Doublure
