= Virgil W. Raines =

Personal information
- Born: March 30, 1911 United States
- Died: May 10, 2000 (aged 89)
- Occupation: Trainer

Horse racing career
- Sport: Horse racing
- Career wins: Not found

Major racing wins
- Delaware Handicap (1944, 1966); Arlington Classic (1950); Dwyer Stakes (1950); Saratoga Cup (1950); Massachusetts Handicap (1950); Sussex Handicap (1950, 1951); Arlington Handicap (1951); Excelsior Handicap (1963); Diana Handicap (1965, 1966); Spinster Stakes (1966); Diana Handicap (1966); Oceanport Handicap (1979); Maryland Million Turf (1988); Maryland Million Classic (1989, 1990, 1991); Ben Ali Stakes (1990); Brooklyn Handicap (1991); Sorority Stakes (1996) American Classic Race wins: Preakness Stakes (1962)

Honours
- Raines Award given by Monmouth Park Racetrack; Delaware Park Wall of Fame (2008)

Significant horses
- Greek Song, Greek Money, Open Fire
- Updated on July 14, 2007

Virgil W. Raines (March 30, 1911 – May 10, 2000) was an American Thoroughbred racehorse trainer.

Known as "Buddy" Raines, in the 1930s he began working as a stable hand and became an exercise rider, notably for the U.S. Racing Hall of Fame colt Cavalcade. He went on to condition racehorses for 65 years, working primarily on the U.S. East Coast and was a regular at Delaware Park and Monmouth Park Racetracks.

Buddy Raines met with his greatest success training horses for Donald Ross's Brandywine Stable. He had great success with Cochise, winning several important races between 1949 and 1951, including the Massachusetts and Arlington Handicaps and the Saratoga Cup and set or equaled track records at Suffolk Downs and Delaware Park.

In July 1950, with the colt Greek Song, Raines won the Arlington Classic, a race that at the time was one of the most important in America. As a stallion, Greek Song was mated to the mare Lucy Lufton, a granddaughter of the great sire Nearco. Their union produced Greek Money who would give Buddy Raines his most important win in 1962 when the chestnut colt won a U.S. Triple Crown race, the Preakness Stakes.

In 1966, Raines conditioned Open Fire to a Champion season. The daughter of Brandywine Stable's Cochise, Open Fire won the Delaware Handicap, the Spinster Stakes as well as the Diana Handicap en route to being voted Co-U.S. Champion Older Mare.

On a personal basis, Buddy Raines played a major role in the rearing of his grandsons John and Mike Luzzi who both became jockeys. One of the family's great memories came in 1991 when the eighty-year-old Raines saddled Timely Warning and watched as grandson Mike Luzzi won the Maryland Million Classic and the Brooklyn Handicap.

In 1996 Monmouth Park began awarding the Virgil W. Raines Distinguished Achievement Award which honors an owner or trainer who has shown a dedication to the sport of Thoroughbred racing through exemplary conduct demonstrating professionalism and integrity.

Buddy Raines was residing in Aiken, South Carolina at the time of his death in 2000. He was nominated for induction in the National Museum of Racing and Hall of Fame in 2006. In 2008, Raines was inducted posthumously in the Delaware Park Wall of Fame.
