= Spinster Stakes =

- Class: Grade I
- Location: Keeneland Race Course; Lexington, Kentucky, United States
- Inaugurated: 1956
- Race type: Thoroughbred – Flat racing
- Website: Keeneland

Race information
- Distance: 1 1/8 miles (9 Furlongs)
- Surface: Dirt
- Track: Left-handed
- Qualification: Three-year-olds & up, fillies & mares
- Weight: Weight-for-age
- Purse: $650,000 (2025)

The Spinster Stakes (also known as the "Juddmonte Spinster" with Juddmonte Farms sponsorship) is an American Thoroughbred horse race for fillies and mares aged three or up run annually in early October at Keeneland Racecourse in Lexington, Kentucky. It is set at a distance of one and one-eighth miles and is a Grade I event with a current purse of $650,000

The Spinster, sponsored by Prince Khalid Abdullah's Juddmonte Farms beginning in 2005, is a major prep for the Breeders' Cup Distaff and one of the most important weight-for-age stakes races exclusively for fillies and mares. Now part of the Breeders' Cup Challenge series, the winner of the Spinster Stakes automatically qualifies for the Breeders' Cup Distaff.

In time for the 2006 edition of the Spinster Stakes, Keeneland replaced its traditional dirt track with the synthetic surface, Polytrack synthetic dirt. In 2014, the Polytrack was replaced by a new dirt surface.

== Records ==
Speed record

On new dirt surface:

- 1:49.44 – Got Lucky (2015)

On synthetic dirt:

- 1:46.77 – Carriage Trail (2008)

On old dirt surface:

- 1:47.00 – Bayakoa (1990)
- 1:47.00 – Banshee Breeze (1998)
- 1:47.19 – Keeper Hill (1999)

Most wins

- 2 – Bornastar (1957, 1958)
- 2 – Susan's Girl (1973, 1975)
- 2 – Bayakoa (1989, 1990)
- 2 – Take Charge Lady (2002, 2003)
- 2 – Blue Prize (2018, 2019)
- 2 – Idiomatic (2023, 2024)

Most wins by an owner

- 3 – Juddmonte Farms (2013, 2023, 2024)

Most wins by a jockey

- 5 – Laffit Pincay Jr. (1972, 1975, 1985, 1989, 1990)
- 5 – Pat Day (1983, 1991, 1994, 1997, 2004)

Most wins by a trainer

- 5 – Todd A. Pletcher (2007, 2012, 2015, 2020, 2022)

== Winners ==
Year	Winner	Jockey	Trainer	Owner	Time
2026	Fully Subscribed	Flavien Prat	Chad C. Brown	Klaravich Stables	1:50.60
2025	Gin Gin	Luis Saez	Brendan P. Walsh	Calumet Farm	1:49.77
2024	Idiomatic	Florent Geroux	Brad H. Cox	Juddmonte Farms	1:49.04
2023	Idiomatic	Florent Geroux	Brad H. Cox	Juddmonte Farms	1:49.82
2022	Malathaat	John Velazquez	Todd A. Pletcher	Shadwell Racing	1:51.05
2021	Letruska	Irad Ortiz Jr	Fausto Gutierrez	St. George Stable	1:49.01
2020	Valiance	Luis Saez	Todd A. Pletcher	Eclipse Thoroughbred Partners, Martin Schwartz & China Horse Club	1:49.76
2019	Blue Prize	Joe Bravo	Ignacio Correas IV	Merriebelle Stable LLC	1:50.30
2018	Blue Prize	Joe Bravo	Ignacio Correas IV	Merriebelle Stable LLC	1:50.02
2017	Romantic Vision	Brian Hernandez Jr.	George R. Arnold II	G. Watts Humphrey Jr.	1:49.70
2016	I'm A Chatterbox	Florent Geroux	J. Larry Jones	Grayson Farm	1:49.98
2015	Got Lucky	Irad Ortiz Jr	Todd A. Pletcher	Hill 'n' Dale Farms	1:49.44
2014	Don't Tell Sophia	Joe Rocco Jr.	Philip A. Sims	Philip A. Sims & Rault LLC	1:49.80
2013	Emollient	Mike E. Smith	William I. Mott	Juddmonte Farms	1:47.75
2012	In Lingerie	John Velazquez	Todd A. Pletcher	Eclipse Thoroughbred Partners & Gary Barber	1:49.42
2011	Aruna	Ramon Domínguez	Graham Motion	Flaxman Holdings	1:47.88
2010	Acoma	Alan Garcia	David Carroll	Helen C. Alexander & Helen K. Groves	1:48 3/5
2009	Mushka	Kent Desormeaux	William I. Mott	Brushwood Stable	1:49.01
2008	Carriage Trail	Kent Desormeaux	Claude R. McGaughey III	S. Janney III & Phipps Stable	1:46.77
2007	Panty Raid	Garrett Gomez	Todd A. Pletcher	Glencrest Farm	1:51.30
2006	Asi Siempre	Julien Leparoux	Patrick Biancone	Martin S. Schwartz	1:51.97
2005	Pampered Princess	Eddie Castro	Martin D. Wolfson	Martin L. Cherry	1:53.91
2004	Azeri	Pat Day	D. Wayne Lukas	Allen E. Paulson	1:49.74
2003	Take Charge Lady	Edgar Prado	Kenneth G. McPeek	Select Stable	1:49.57
2002	Take Charge Lady	Edgar Prado	Kenneth G. McPeek	Select Stable	1:49.90
2001	Miss Linda	Richard Migliore	John C. Kimmel	Ackerley Brothers Farm	1:49.79
2000	Plenty of Light	Garrett Gomez	W. Elliott Walden	Aaron U. & Marie Jones	1:48.18
1999	Keeper Hill	Kent Desormeaux	Robert J. Frankel	Claude R. McGaughey III & Dr. John A. Chandler	1:47.19
1998	Banshee Breeze	Robby Albarado	Carl Nafzger	James B. Tafel	1:47.00
1997	Clear Mandate	Pat Day	George R. Arnold II	G. Watts Humphrey Jr.	1:50.40
1996	Different	Chris McCarron	Ron McAnally	Sidney H. Craig	1:49.60
1995	Inside Information	Mike E. Smith	C. R. McGaughey III	Ogden Mills Phipps	1:50.00
1994	Dispute	Pat Day	C. R. McGaughey III	Ogden Mills Phipps	1:48.80
1993	Paseana	Chris McCarron	Ron McAnally	Sidney H. Craig	1:48.40
1992	Fowda	Pat Valenzuela	Alex L. Hassinger Jr.	Allen E. Paulson	1:49.80
1991	Wilderness Song	Pat Day	James E. Day	Sam-Son Farm	1:49.60
1990	Bayakoa	Laffit Pincay Jr.	Ron McAnally	Frank E. Whitham	1:47.00
1989	Bayakoa	Laffit Pincay Jr.	Ron McAnally	Frank E. Whitham	1:47.80
1988	Hail a Cab	Jacinto Vásquez	Philip M. Hauswald	John A. Bell III	1:51.00
1987	Sacahuista	Randy Romero	D. Wayne Lukas	L.R. French Jr. & Barry Beal	1:48.60
1986	Top Corsage	Sandy Hawley	Jerry M. Fanning	Dan J. Agnew	1:48.20
1985	Dontstop Themusic	Laffit Pincay Jr.	Randy Winick	Albert R. Broccoli	1:50.40
1984	Princess Rooney	Ed Delahoussaye	Neil Drysdale	Paula J. Tucker	1:50.40
1983	Try Something New	Pat Day	C. R. McGaughey III	John A. Bell III	1:49.80
1982	Track Robbery	Pat Valenzuela	John W. Russell	Summa Stable	1:47.40
1981	Glorious Song	Robin Platts	John Cairns	Frank Stronach & Nelson Bunker Hunt	1:49.20
1980	Bold 'n Determined	Ed Delahoussaye	Neil Drysdale	Saron Stable	1:49.20
1979	Safe	Earlie Fires	Joseph M. Bollero	Elizabeth J. Brisbine	1:49.20
1978	Tempest Queen	Jorge Velásquez	Lou Rondinello	John W. Galbreath	1:49.00
1977	Cum Laude Laurie	Ángel Cordero Jr.	Lou Rondinello	Daniel M. Galbreath	1:48.40
1976	Optimistic Gal	Craig Perret	LeRoy Jolley	Diana M. Firestone	1:51.60
1975	Susan's Girl	Laffit Pincay Jr.	Thomas W. Kelley	Fred W. Hooper	1:49.80
1974	Summer Guest	Daryl Montoya	J. Elliott Burch	Rokeby Stable	1:48.40
1973	Susan's Girl	Braulio Baeza	Chuck Parke	Fred W. Hooper	1:48.80
1972	Numbered Account	Laffit Pincay Jr.	Roger Laurin	Ogden Phipps	1:47.40
1971	Chou Croute	Robert Kotenko	Robert G. Dunham	E. V. Benjamin III et al.	1:49.00
1970	Taken Aback	Eddie Belmonte	H. Allen Jerkens	Hobeau Farm	1:51.40
1969	Gallant Bloom	John L. Rotz	William J. Hirsch	King Ranch	1:48.80
1968	Sale Day	Eric Guerin	John Winans	Louise Clements	1:51.60
1967	Straight Deal II	Howard Grant	John W. Jacobs	Ethel D. Jacobs	1:49.20
1966	Open Fire	Braulio Baeza	Virgil W. Raines	Brandywine Stable	1:50.40
1965	Star Maggie	Bill Hartack	Robert E. Wingfield	James T. Jones	1:50.20
1964	Old Hat	Don Brumfield	Charles C. Norman	Stanley Conrad	1:48.40
1963	Lamb Chop	Manuel Ycaza	James W. Maloney	William Haggin Perry	1:48.40
1962	Primonetta	Bill Shoemaker	James P. Conway	Darby Dan Farm	1:48.40
1961	Bowl of Flowers	Eddie Arcaro	J. Elliott Burch	Brookmeade Stable	1:49.60
1960	Rash Statement	John L. Rotz	Allen R. Hultz	Hal Price Headley	1:49.60
1959	Royal Native	Bill Hartack	Kenny Noe Sr.	Perne L. Grissom	1:49.40
1958	Bornastar	Kenneth Church	W. Graves Sparks	J. Graham Brown	1:49.40
1957	Bornastar	Kenneth Church	W. Graves Sparks	J. Graham Brown	1:49.20
1956	Doubledogdare	John Heckmann	Moody Jolley	Claiborne Farm	1:49.20
