= Garden Path =

British-bred Thoroughbred racehorse

- Sire: Fairway
- Grandsire: Phalaris
- Dam: Ranais
- Damsire: Rabelais
- Sex: Mare
- Foaled: 1941
- Country: United Kingdom
- Colour: Brown
- Breeder: Edward Stanley, 17th Earl of Derby
- Owner: Lord Derby
- Trainer: Walter Earl
- Record: 6: 3-0-2

Major wins
- 2000 Guineas (1944)

Garden Path (foaled 1941) was a British Thoroughbred racehorse and broodmare who won the classic 2000 Guineas in 1944. In a racing career conducted entirely at Newmarket Racecourse the filly ran six times and won three races. She was one of the best British two-year-olds of 1943, when she won one race and was placed in both the Middle Park Stakes and the Cheveley Park Stakes. After winning on her first appearance of 1944 she became the first (and still the only) filly since 1902 to win the 2000 Guineas against colts. On her only subsequent race she was injured when finishing unplaced in the Derby. She was retired from racing at the end of the season and had some success as a broodmare.

== Background ==
Garden Path was a big, good-looking brown mare bred by her owner the Edward Stanley, 17th Earl of Derby. Her sire, Fairway, had been a highly successful racehorse for Lord Derby, winning the St Leger and two runnings of the Champion Stakes. Garden Path's successes in 1944 enabled Fairway to win the sires' Championship for the fourth and final time. Garden Path's dam, Ranai, won two minor races before producing many good winners including the 2000 Guineas winner Watling Street (also sired by Fairway). Lord Derby sent the horse to his private trainer Walter Earl at his Stanley House stable in Newmarket, Suffolk.

Garden Path's racing career took place during World War II during which horse racing in Britain was subject to many restrictions. Several major racecourses, including Epsom and Doncaster, were closed for the duration of the conflict, either for safety reasons, or because they were being used by the military. Many important races were rescheduled to new dates and venues, often at short notice, and all five of the Classics were usually run at Newmarket.

== Racing career ==
=== 1943: two-year-old season ===
Garden Path began her racing career by winning the Tostock Stakes, a maiden race at Newmarket. She was then moved up in class to contest the six furlong Cheveley Park Stakes, the year's most important race for two-year-old fillies in which she finished third to Fair Fame. Garden Path then ran in the Middle Park Stakes over the same course and distance, in which she was matched against some of the season's leading colts and finished third again behind Orestes and Happy Landing. In the Free Handicap, a ranking of the season's best juveniles, Garden Path was given a rating of 123 pounds, eight below the top-rated Orestes and five below Fair Fame, the top filly.

=== 1944: three-year-old season ===
On her three-year-old debut, Garden Path won the Chatteris Stakes over one mile. Her connections then took the unusual decision to bypass the fillies classic, the 1000 Guineas, and race her against colts in the 2000 Guineas a day later. Because of wartime restrictions, both races were moved from their traditional Rowley Mile venue to the adjoining Newmarket July (or Summer) course. No filly had won the race, or even finished in the first three since the victory of Sceptre in 1902. Ridden by Harry Wragg, Garden Path started the 5/1 favourite in a field of twenty-six runners. She took the lead a quarter of a mile from the finish and held on to win by a head from Growing Confidence, with the future St Leger winner Tehran in third. Among the unplaced runners was a 33/1 outsider named Ocean Swell. Garden Path's victory gave Lord Derby his sixteenth classic win in twenty years.

On 17 June Garden Path returned to the July course for the New Derby Stakes, a wartime substitute for the Epsom Derby. Despite wartime austerity, the race attracted considerable public interest, with bookmakers reporting that betting was heavier than for many peacetime runnings of the race. In a field of twenty runners, Garden Path disputed favouritism with Tehran, Mustang and Growing Confidence. During the race however, the filly sustained a serious injury to the suspensory ligaments of her leg and finished tenth behind Ocean Swell, who beat Tehran by a neck. Garden Path never raced again and was retired to stud.

== Assessment and honours ==
In their book, A Century of Champions, based on the Timeform rating system, John Randall and Tony Morris rated Garden Path an "inferior" winner of the 2000 Guineas.

== Retirement ==
Garden Path was retired to become a broodmare at her owner's stud. She produced five winners, three at stakes level. The best of her offspring was Leading Light, a colt sired by Hyperion who won the Knights Royal Stakes, the race which would later become known as the Queen Elizabeth II Stakes.

== Pedigree ==
Pedigree of Garden Path (GB), brown mare, 1941
Sire Fairway (GB) Bay 1925	Phalaris bay 1913	Polymelus	Cyllene
Sire Fairway (GB) Bay 1925	Phalaris bay 1913	Polymelus	Maid Marian
Sire Fairway (GB) Bay 1925	Phalaris bay 1913	Bromus	Sainfoin
Sire Fairway (GB) Bay 1925	Phalaris bay 1913	Bromus	Cheery
Sire Fairway (GB) Bay 1925	Scapa Flow chestnut 1914	Chaucer	St. Simon
Sire Fairway (GB) Bay 1925	Scapa Flow chestnut 1914	Chaucer	Canterbury Pilgrim
Sire Fairway (GB) Bay 1925	Scapa Flow chestnut 1914	Anchora	Love Wisely
Sire Fairway (GB) Bay 1925	Scapa Flow chestnut 1914	Anchora	Eryholme
Dam Ranai (FR) bay 1925	Rabelais bay 1900	St. Simon*	Galopin
Dam Ranai (FR) bay 1925	Rabelais bay 1900	St. Simon*	St. Angela
Dam Ranai (FR) bay 1925	Rabelais bay 1900	Satirical	Satiety
Dam Ranai (FR) bay 1925	Rabelais bay 1900	Satirical	Chaff
Dam Ranai (FR) bay 1925	Dark Sedge bay 1916	Prestige	Le Pompon
Dam Ranai (FR) bay 1925	Dark Sedge bay 1916	Prestige	Orgueilleuse
Dam Ranai (FR) bay 1925	Dark Sedge bay 1916	Beattie	Volodyovski
Dam Ranai (FR) bay 1925	Dark Sedge bay 1916	Beattie	Crusado (Family:7)

- Garden Path was inbred 3 × 4 to St. Simon, meaning that this stallion appears in both the third and the fourth generations of his pedigree.
