= James P. Conway =

American horse trainer (1910–1984)

Jimmy Conway
Personal information
- Born: August 4, 1910 United States
- Died: May 31, 1984 (aged 73)
- Occupation: Trainer

Horse racing career
- Sport: Horse racing
- Career wins: Not found

Major racing wins
- Demoiselle Stakes (1946, 1952); Cowdin Stakes (1947); Juvenile Stakes (1947); Louisiana Derby (1947, 1974); National Stallion Stakes (1947, 1952); Delaware Oaks (1948, 1961); Diana Handicap (1948); Dwyer Stakes (1948); Grand Union Hotel Stakes (1948); Great American Stakes (1948); Ladies Handicap (1948); National Stallion Stakes (1948, 1952); United States Hotel Stakes (1948, 1952); Wood Memorial Stakes (1948); Beldame Stakes (1949, 1957); Edgemere Handicap (1949); Excelsior Handicap (1949, 1960); New Orleans Handicap (1949); Brooklyn Handicap (1950); Merchants and Citizens Handicap (1950); Astarita Stakes (1952); Schuylerville Stakes (1952); Coaching Club American Oaks (1953, 1962); Delaware Handicap (1953); Gazelle Handicap (1953, 1962); Monmouth Oaks (1953); Prioress Stakes (1953, 1961); Arlington Matron Handicap (1957); Washington Park Handicap (1957); Massachusetts Handicap (1960); Alabama Stakes (1961); Astoria Stakes (1961); Falls City Handicap (1961); Miss Woodford Stakes (1961); Regret Handicap (1961); Tremont Stakes (1961); Jerome Handicap (1962, 1963); Molly Pitcher Handicap (1962, 1976); Spinster Stakes (1962); Test Stakes (1962); Blue Grass Stakes (1963); Vosburgh Stakes (1963); Spinaway Stakes (1964); United Nations Stakes (1967); Bahamas Stakes (1968); Bay Shore Stakes (1968); Gotham Stakes (1968); Whitney Stakes (1969); Amory L. Haskell Handicap (1969); Haskell Invitational Handicap (1970); Hawthorne Gold Cup Handicap (1971); Mother Goose Stakes (1972); Royal Palm Handicap (1973); Bowling Green Handicap (1976) American Classic Race wins: Kentucky Derby (1963); Belmont Stakes (1963)

Honours
- National Museum of Racing and Hall of Fame (1996)

Significant horses
- Chateaugay, Grecian Queen, Miss Request, My Request, Primonetta, Pucker Up

James P. Conway (August 4, 1910 - May 31, 1984) was an American Hall of Fame trainer in Thoroughbred horse racing who trained forty-three stakes winners including five Champions and a winner of two American Classic Races.

Before becoming a professional trainer in 1946, Conway worked at various racetrack jobs. His first major client was Dallas, Texas hotel owner Ben Whitaker for whom "Jimmy" Conway conditioned the 1948 and 1953 American Champion Three-Year-Old Filly, Miss Request and Grecian Queen. Whitaker died in April 1954, and Conway's next Champion was with another filly named Pucker Up. Owned by Ada L. Rice, Pucker Up was the 1957 American Champion Older Female Horse.

From 1962 to 1966 Jimmy Conway trained for John Galbreath's Darby Dan Farm with whom he would enjoy his greatest success. In his first year with Darby Dan, Conway conditioned the filly Primonetta to 1962 American Champion Older Female Horse honors then the following year won two of the U.S. Triple Crown races with Chateaugay. The colt won the 1963 Kentucky Derby at 1¼ miles, finished second to Candy Spots in the 1³/16 mile Preakness Stakes, then won the 1½ mile Belmont Stakes. Chateaugay would be Conway's fifth Champion, voted 1963 American Champion Three-Year-Old Male Horse.

Besides his 1963 win in the Kentucky Derby, Conway had four other horses who ran in the prestigious race: 1948 (3rd), 1957 (6th), 1968 (2nd), 1970 (12th).

After leaving the Darby Dan stable, in 1967 Conway returned to operating a public stable, training horses for notable owners such as Maxwell Gluck's Elmendorf Farm.

Following a lengthy illness, Jimmy Conway died at age seventy-three at Nassau Hospital in Mineola on Long Island, New York. In 1996 he was inducted in the United States' National Museum of Racing and Hall of Fame.
