= Watling Street (horse) =

British-bred Thoroughbred racehorse

- Sire: Fairway
- Grandsire: Phalaris
- Dam: Ranai
- Damsire: Rabelais
- Sex: Stallion
- Foaled: 1939
- Country: Great Britain
- Colour: Bay
- Breeder: Lord Derby
- Owner: Lord Derby
- Trainer: Walter Earl
- Record: 9: 4-4-1
- Earnings: £ not found

Major wins
- Chesterfield Stakes (1941); British Classic Race wins: Epsom Derby (1942)

Watling Street (1939–1953) was a British Thoroughbred racehorse and sire. In a career which lasted from spring 1941 to September 1942 he ran nine times and won four races. Having been rated the third best British two-year-old of his generation he went on to greater success as a three-year-old the following year when he won a wartime substitute version of The Derby and finished second in both the 2000 Guineas and the "New" St Leger. At the end of 1942 he was retired to a stud career of limited importance. He was eventually exported to the United States where he died in 1953.

== Background ==
Watling Street was a tall, leggy bay horse standing 16.1¾ hands high bred by his owner Lord Derby and the colt was named for Watling Street, an ancient trackway in England and Wales. His sire, Fairway, had been a highly successful racehorse for Lord Derby, winning the St Leger and two runnings of the Champion Stakes. Watling's Street's dam, Ranai, won two minor races before producing many good winners including the 2000 Guineas winner Garden Path.

Lord Derby sent the horse to his private trainer Walter Earl at his Stanley House stable in Newmarket, Suffolk.

== Racing career ==
=== 1941: two-year-old season ===
The Second World War led to horse racing being conducted on a restricted scale with a restructured programme. With many racecourses used by the military or considered dangerous due to their proximity to major population centres, races were either cancelled or moved away from their traditional venues. Most of the major races, including all the classics were run at Newmarket.

Watling Street began his career by winning the Littleport Stakes and the Chesterfield Stakes in the spring of 1941. He then ran in the Coventry Stakes, which was run at Newmarket instead of its usual venue of Royal Ascot. He finished second to the easy winner Big Game, a colt owned by King George VI. The main races of Doncaster's St Leger meeting in September were also rescheduled and the Champagne Stakes was run at Newbury in late June. In this race Watling Street was beaten again by Big Game, although the Royal colt's margin of superiority was only a short-head. On his final start of the season, Watling Street ran disappointingly to finish fourth in the Middle Park Stakes behind the King's filly Sun Chariot.

In the Free Handicap, a ranking of the season's best two-year-olds, Watling Street was given a rating of 130 pounds, placing him third behind Sun Chariot (133) and Big Game (133).

=== 1942: three-year-old season ===
Watling Street began his three-year-old season by winning the Shelford Stakes over one mile before running in the 2000 Guineas. He finished second, beaten four lengths by the odds-on favourite Big Game.

With Epsom Downs Racecourse out of use, the substitute "New Derby Stakes" was run on the July course at Newmarket on 13 June in front of a crowd which included the King and Queen. Ridden by Harry Wragg, Watling Street started at odds of 6/1, with Big Game being made the 4/6 favourite. Watling Street won by a neck from Hyperides, with Ujiji two lengths back in third.and Big Game sixth. His win, in a time of 2:29.6 which equaled the wartime Derby record, was received with little enthusiasm by the spectators who had been anticipating a Royal victory.

On 12 September, Watling Street started favourite for the substitute "New St Leger Stakes" at Newmarket. He finished second of the eight runners, three lengths behind Sun Chariot, but five lengths clear of Hyperides in third. Shortly after his defeat at Doncaster, it was announced that Watling Street would be retired from racing and would begin his stud career at a fee of £198.

== Stud record ==
Retired to stud duty, Watling Street made little impression as a sire of winners, with the best of his progeny being the Cumberland Lodge Stakes winner Rawson. He was exported to the United States in 1952. After standing for one season at the Claiborne Farm he died in late 1953. In his only American season he sired Go-Modern, who produced TRA United States Champion Older Mare Summer Scandal.

== Pedigree ==
Pedigree of Watling Street (GB), bay 1939
Sire Fairway (GB) Bay 1925	Phalaris bay 1913	Polymelus	Cyllene
Sire Fairway (GB) Bay 1925	Phalaris bay 1913	Polymelus	Maid Marian
Sire Fairway (GB) Bay 1925	Phalaris bay 1913	Bromus	Sainfoin
Sire Fairway (GB) Bay 1925	Phalaris bay 1913	Bromus	Cheery
Sire Fairway (GB) Bay 1925	Scapa Flow chestnut 1914	Chaucer	St. Simon
Sire Fairway (GB) Bay 1925	Scapa Flow chestnut 1914	Chaucer	Canterbury Pilgrim
Sire Fairway (GB) Bay 1925	Scapa Flow chestnut 1914	Anchora	Love Wisely
Sire Fairway (GB) Bay 1925	Scapa Flow chestnut 1914	Anchora	Eryholme
Dam Ranai (FR) bay 1925	Rabelais bay 1900	St. Simon*	Galopin
Dam Ranai (FR) bay 1925	Rabelais bay 1900	St. Simon*	St. Angela
Dam Ranai (FR) bay 1925	Rabelais bay 1900	Satirical	Satiety
Dam Ranai (FR) bay 1925	Rabelais bay 1900	Satirical	Chaff
Dam Ranai (FR) bay 1925	Dark Sedge bay 1916	Prestige	Le Pompon
Dam Ranai (FR) bay 1925	Dark Sedge bay 1916	Prestige	Orgueilleuse
Dam Ranai (FR) bay 1925	Dark Sedge bay 1916	Beattie	Volodyovski
Dam Ranai (FR) bay 1925	Dark Sedge bay 1916	Beattie	Crusado (Family:7)

- Watling Street was inbred 3 × 4 to St. Simon, meaning that this stallion appears in both the third and the fourth generations of his pedigree.
