= Walter Earl =

Personal information
- Born: 1890 Bohemia
- Died: 1950 (aged 59–60)
- Occupation: Trainer

Horse racing career
- Sport: Horse racing

Major racing wins
- British Classic Race wins: 2000 Guineas (1); 1000 Guineas (2); Epsom Derby (1); Epsom Oaks (1); St Leger (1)

Racing awards
- British flat racing Champion Trainer (1945)

Significant horses
- Watling Street, Herringbone, Garden Path, Sun Stream, Alycidon

Walter Earl (1890–1950) was a British Thoroughbred racehorse trainer. After a riding career of limited importance he became a private trainer, first for Solomon Joel and later for Lord Derby. He was one of the most successful trainers of the 1940s, sending out the winners of six classics and winning the title of Champion Trainer in 1945. His best horse was Alycidon who won the Ascot Gold Cup in 1949.

== Background ==
Walter Earl was born in 1890 in Bohemia, to British parents. After returning to England he became an apprentice jockey at the stable of William Waugh at Kingsclere in Hampshire, riding his first winner in 1906. As Earl matured his weight increased and he was forced abandon his career as a flat jockey and rode for several years in National Hunt events before retiring from the saddle in his late twenties.

== Training career ==
Earl began his training career in 1920, with his early patrons including Robert Sievier, best known as the owner of Sceptre. In 1924 he moved to the Moulton Paddocks Stable in Newmarket, Suffolk where he became the private trainer to Solomon Joel. He trained several major winners for his patron including Polyphontes (Eclipse Stakes), Glommen (Goodwood Cup), Pons Asinorum (Ebor Handicap, Doncaster Cup) and Dark Warrior (Lincolnshire Handicap). After Joel's death in 1931, Earl ran a public stable for several years with limited success.

In 1939, Earl was appointed as the private trainer to Lord Derby at the Stanley House Stable in Newmarket. The outbreak of the Second World War in the same year led to horse racing being conducted on a restricted scale with a restructured programme. With many racecourses used by the military or considered dangerous due to their proximity to major population centres, races were either cancelled or moved away from their traditional venues. In 1942 Earl trained Lord Derby's Watling Street to win the substitute Epsom Derby at Newmarket Racecourse, beating the King's colt Big Game. In the following year Earl trained the filly Herringbone to win two classics, taking the New 1000 Guineas at the Newmarket July course in spring before defeating Straight Deal and Nasrullah in the New St Leger at the same venue in autumn. In 1944 Earl secured a fourth wartime classic when the filly Garden Path (a full-sister to Watling Street) defeated male opposition to win the 2000 Guineas. 1945 saw two further classic wins for Walter Earl and Lord Derby as the filly Sun Stream won both the 1000 Guineas and the New Oaks at Newmarket. At the end of the year he won his first and only trainers' championship having won 41 races and £29,557 in prize money.

1946 saw racing return to pre-war conditions and Earl trained Gulf Stream to finish second in The Derby before winning the Eclipse Stakes. In the same year, Lord Derby sent Earl a chestnut yearling colt sired by the French-bred stallion Donatello. Named Alycidon, the colt became the best horse Earl ever trained and one of the greatest stayers of the 20th century, winning the Ormonde Stakes, Ascot Gold Cup, Goodwood Cup and Doncaster Cup in 1949.

== Death and assessment ==
By the time of Alycidon's success, Earl was in failing health as a result of a brain tumour and retired at the end of the 1949 season. He died in September 1950. Earl was a very popular man in racing circles. His approach to training was said to be more instinctive than methodical.
