= John L. Rotz =

American jockey (1934–2021)

Personal information
- Born: December 16, 1934 Niantic, Illinois, U.S.
- Died: July 12, 2021 (aged 86) Rotz Farm Warrensburg, IL
- Occupation: Jockey

Horse racing career
- Sport: Horse racing
- Career wins: 2,907

Major racing wins
- Arkansas Derby (1956); Ben Ali Handicap (1956); Alcibiades Stakes (1959); Breeders' Futurity Stakes (1959); Clark Handicap (1960); Lafayette Stakes (1960); Matron stakes (1960, 1966); Modesty Handicap (1960); Spinster Stakes (1960, 1969); Aqueduct Handicap (1961); Arlington Classic (1961); Frank E. Kilroe Mile Handicap (1961); Remsen Stakes (1961, 1962); Saranac Stakes (1961, 1967, 1970); Wood Memorial Stakes (1961, 1963); Metropolitan Handicap (1962, 1968); National Stallion Stakes (1962, 1963); Philip H. Iselin Handicap (1962, 1972); Canadian Championship Stakes (1963); Champagne Stakes (1963, 1969, 1972); Juvenile Stakes (1963); Ladies Handicap (1963); Man o' War Stakes (1963); Toboggan Handicap (1963); Acorn Stakes (1964, 1971); Black Helen Handicap (1964, 1966); Jerome Handicap (1964); Jim Dandy Stakes (1964, 1966); Test Stakes (1964, 1968); Vagrancy Handicap (1964, 1971); Alabama Stakes (1965, 1968); Beldame Stakes (1965); Comely Stakes (1965, 1966); Florida Derby (1965); Gazelle Stakes (1965, 1969); Belmont Futurity Stakes (1966, 1969, 1970); Hopeful Stakes (1966, 1970); Laurel Futurity (1966); National Stallion Stakes (filly division) (1966, 1968, 1970); Red Smith Handicap (1966); Spinaway Stakes (1966); Withers Stakes (1966); Fall Highweight Handicap (1967, 1969, 1970, 1972); Gardenia Stakes (1968); Gotham Stakes (1968); Massachusetts Handicap (1968); Bay Shore Stakes (1968); Arlington-Washington Futurity (1969); Bed O' Roses Breeders' Cup Handicap (1969); Cowdin Stakes (1969); Delaware Handicap (1969); Palm Beach Handicap (1969); Roamer Handicap (1969); Vosburgh Stakes (1969); Cotillion Handicap (1970); Santa Margarita Handicap (1970); Santa Maria Handicap (1970); Carter Handicap (1971); Hollywood Lassie Stakes (1971); Lexington Handicap (1971); Mother Goose Stakes (1971); Woodward Stakes (1971); Ashland Stakes (1972); Fayette Handicap (1972); Knickerbocker Handicap (1972); Las Flores Handicap (1972); Santa Monica Handicap (1973) American Classic Race wins: Preakness Stakes (1962); Belmont Stakes (1970)

Racing awards
- George Woolf Memorial Jockey Award (1973)

Honors
- National Museum of Racing and Hall of Fame (1983)

Significant horses
- Gallant Bloom, Carry Back, Ta Wee, Greek Money, Stop the Music, High Echelon, Dr. Fager, In Reality, Silent Screen
- Updated on December 12, 2021

John L. Rotz (December 16, 1934 – July 12, 2021) was an American Thoroughbred horse racing jockey and a World Champion in Western riding competitions.

== Early career ==
After graduating from Warrensburg-Latham High School in Illinois in 1952, Rotz went to work at Fairmount Park Racetrack in Collinsville, Illinois. After working as a groom, hot walker, and exercise rider, he began riding professionally in 1953. Nicknamed "Gentleman John" because of his polite demeanor, he gained a reputation for being able to handle temperamental Thoroughbreds.

== Riding career ==
During a 20-year riding career, Rotz won many of the most important races across the United States. In 1969 and 1970, he won more stakes races than any other jockey in American racing. He earned two wins in the American Classic Races, the first coming in 1962 when he rode Greek Money to victory in the Preakness Stakes. A year earlier, he finished second in the Preakness aboard Globemaster and earned another second-place finish in 1968 with King Ranch's Out of the Way. He got his second Classic race win aboard High Echelon in the 1970 Belmont Stakes.

In 1973, Rotz was voted the George Woolf Memorial Jockey Award, given to a jockey in North America who demonstrates high standards of personal and professional conduct, on and off the racetrack. He retired from riding that year following surgery for a foot injury, but he remained active in the industry, working for ten years as a racing steward at various racetracks in Louisiana, Ohio, Delaware, and New York. While working at Thistledown Racecourse in North Randall, Ohio in 1975, he met his wife, Mary, whose sister was a horse trainer at the track.

== Retirement ==
Rotz retired as a racing steward on March 31, 1983. He and his wife returned to his native Warrensburg, Illinois where they purchased a 280-acre (1.1 km^{2}) farm. Mary Rotz became involved with the rehabilitation of injured and orphaned wildlife through her Prairie Wildlife Rehabilitation program while John turned to riding Quarter horses in Western riding competitions. In 1987, he won the National Reining Horse Association Novice Horse Non-Pro World Championship. He rode well into his 70s, competing in cutting horse competitions at the Illinois State Fair and other shows in the Midwest. After he stopped competing, Rotz continued to participate in special fundraising events with other active and retired top jockeys to support the Permanently Disabled Jockeys Fund.

John Rotz died peacefully on July 12, 2021, at age 86 at his farm in Warrensburg, Illinois.

== Honors ==
John Rotz was inducted in the United States' National Museum of Racing and Hall of Fame in 1983.

Rotz, 1952 graduate, received a Warrensburg-Latham H.S. "Distinguished Alumni" Award in 1985... given by the W-L Education Foundation.
