= Nimbus (British horse) =

British-bred Thoroughbred racehorse

- Sire: Nearco
- Grandsire: Pharos
- Dam: Kong
- Damsire: Baytown
- Sex: Stallion
- Foaled: 1946
- Country: Great Britain
- Colour: Bay
- Breeder: William Hill
- Owner: Marion Glenister
- Trainer: George Colling
- Record: 9: 6-2-1
- Earnings: £33,076

Major wins
- July Stakes (1948); 2000 Guineas (1949); Epsom Derby (1949)

Honours
- Deltic locomotive 55020 was named Nimbus
- Last updated on 11 January 2010

Nimbus (1946–1972) was a British Thoroughbred racehorse. In a racing career which lasted from the spring of 1948 until August 1949, he ran nine times and won six races. Nimbus ran successfully as a two-year-old in 1948, winning the July Stakes, but reached his peak the following year. He won close finishes in both the 2000 Guineas and The Derby but was unable to attempt the Triple Crown after his career was ended by injury. He had modest success as a breeding stallion.

== Background ==
Nimbus was a bay horse with a white star and snip and white socks on his hind feet. He was bred by William Hill who would go on to win the St. Leger Stakes in 1959 with Cantelo. He was sired by Nearco, one of the most important sires of the 20th century. His dam, Kong, was sprinter whose victories included the Wokingham Stakes at Royal Ascot. In addition to Nimbus, Kong also produced Nimbus's three-quarter brother Grey Sovereign (sired by Nearco's son Nasrullah) who won the Richmond Stakes and became a successful breeding stallion. As a yearling, Nimbus was sent to the sales where he was bought for 5000 guineas by the trainer George Colling, acting on behalf of Henry Glenister. The colt was trained by Colling at his Hurworth House stable in Newmarket, Suffolk and raced in the colours of Glenister's wife, Marion.

== Racing career ==
=== 1948: two-year-old season ===
As a two-year-old in 1948, Nimbus ran five times and won twice. At Royal Ascot he finished second to Royal Forest in the Coventry Stakes and then won the July Stakes at Newmarket. In the Champagne Stakes at Doncaster in September he finished second by six lengths to Abernant. In the Free Handicap, a rating of the season's best two-year-olds he was given a weight of 123 pounds, ten pounds behind Abernant.

=== 1949: three-year-old season ===
Nimbus made good physical progress over the winter and began his three-year-old season by winning the Classic Trial Stakes at Thirsk. He was then sent to Newmarket for the 2000 Guineas, in which he was ridden by the veteran Charlie Elliott, and started at odds of 10/1, with Abernant starting odds-on favourite. Aberant built up a clear lead, but Nimbus made rapid progress in the closing stages and caught the favourite on the line to win by a short-head in the closest finish in the race's history.

At Epsom Downs Racecourse a month later, Nimbus started at odds of 7/1 for the Derby in field of thirty-two runners, with Royal Forest, ridden by Gordon Richards being made 9/2 favourite. Heavy rain made the ground very soft, but did not deter a crowd of 500,000 which included Queen Mary, Queen Elizabeth, Princess Elizabeth and Winston Churchill. With Colling suffering from poor health, Nimbus was saddled by Jack Jarvis. Despite doubts about the colt's stamina, Elliott sent Nimbus to the front almost from the start. Throughout the last half mile he was strongly challenged and briefly headed by Swallow Tail as the two colts went clear of the field. In the closing stages he was also challenged by the fast-finishing French-trained colt Amour Drake, who moved up along the rails as Nimbus and Swallow Tail drifted towards the centre of the course. In a three-way photo-finish, Nimbus prevailed by a head from Amour Drake with Swallow Tail a head away in third. In August, Nimbus walked over in a race at Haydock Park Racecourse. Soon afterwards he sustained an injury which ended his racing career.

== Stud career ==
Retired to stud duty for the 1950 season, the offspring of Nimbus met with limited racing success. The best of his offspring were Nucleus, who finished second in the 1955 St Leger Stakes and the Coronation Cup winner Nagami. He was also the damsire of Greek Money who won the 1962 Preakness Stakes. In 1963, Nimbus was sold and exported to Japan in 1963, where he died in 1972.

== Assessment and honours ==
Nimbus was given a rating of 130 by Timeform in 1949. In their book A Century of Champions, John Randall and Tony Morris rated Nimbus an "average" winner of the 2000 Guineas but an "inferior" Derby winner.

Following the London & North Eastern Railway tradition of naming locomotives after winning racehorses, British Railways "Deltic" Diesel locomotive no. D9020 (later 55020) was named after the horse on 12 February 1962, and remained in service until 5 January 1980.

== Pedigree ==
Pedigree of Nimbus (GB), bay stallion, 1946
Sire Nearco	Pharos	Phalaris	Polymelus
Sire Nearco	Pharos	Phalaris	Bromus
Sire Nearco	Pharos	Scapa Flow	Chaucer
Sire Nearco	Pharos	Scapa Flow	Anchora
Sire Nearco	Nogara	Havresac	Rabelais
Sire Nearco	Nogara	Havresac	Hors Concours
Sire Nearco	Nogara	Catnip	Spearmint
Sire Nearco	Nogara	Catnip	Sibola
Dam Kong	Baytown	Achtoi	Santoi
Dam Kong	Baytown	Achtoi	Achray
Dam Kong	Baytown	Princess Herodias	Poor Boy
Dam Kong	Baytown	Princess Herodias	Queen Herodias
Dam Kong	Clang	Hainault	Swynford
Dam Kong	Clang	Hainault	Bromus
Dam Kong	Clang	Vibration	Black Jester
Dam Kong	Clang	Vibration	Radiancy (Family 6-f)
