= Donald P. Ross =

American businessman

Donald Peabody Ross (November 5, 1902 – October 11, 1973) was an American businessman who co-founded Delaware Park Racetrack in Stanton, Delaware, and whose Brandywine Stable won the 1962 Preakness Stakes with its colt, Greek Money. Another of the stable's top runners was the 1966 American Champion Older Dirt Female Horse, Open Fire.

Ross was a steward of The Jockey Club, a president of the Thoroughbred Racing Association, and a founding member of the board of trustees of the National Museum of Racing and Hall of Fame.

In 1928, Ross married Wihelmina H. Du Pont, daughter of William Kemble du Pont (1874–1907) and Ethel Fleet Hallock (1876–1951). The couple had a son and two daughters.
