= Orville (horse) =

British-bred Thoroughbred racehorse

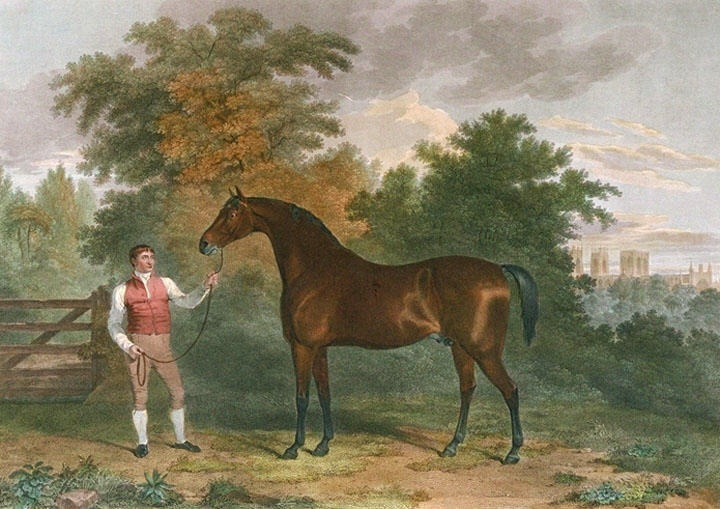
- Sire: Beningbrough
- Grandsire: King Fergus
- Dam: Evelina
- Damsire: Highflyer
- Sex: Stallion
- Foaled: 1799
- Country: Kingdom of Great Britain
- Colour: Bay
- Breeder: William Fitzwilliam, 4th Earl Fitzwilliam
- Owner: 4th Earl Fitzwilliam; The Prince of Wales
- Trainer: Christopher Scaife
- Record: 34: 20-8-1

Major wins
- St Leger Stakes (1802); Doncaster Free Handicap (1804); Match against Stockton (1804); Somerset Stakes (1805, 1807); Brighton Gold Cup (1805); King's Plate (Lewes) (1805); Match against Sancho (1806); Newmarket Free Handicap (1807); Match against Pelisse (1807); Ladies' Plate (Lewes) (1807)

Awards
- Leading sire in Great Britain and Ireland (1817, 1823)

Orville (1799–1826) was a British Thoroughbred racehorse and sire. In a racing career which lasted from August 1801 until October 1807 the horse ran thirty-four times and won twenty races. In his early career he was based in Yorkshire and won the classic St Leger Stakes at Doncaster Racecourse as a three-year-old in 1802.

He had some success in the next two seasons before being sold to the Prince of Wales and being moved to campaign in the south of England. In his last three seasons he won fifteen races at long distances, becoming particularly effective over Newmarket's four mile Beacon Course, and winning several match races against the leading stayers of the day. After his racing career ended he became a highly successful breeding stallion.

== Background ==
Orville was a bay horse with a white star bred by his owner William Fitzwilliam, 4th Earl Fitzwilliam. He was from the first crop of foals sired by the St Leger winner Beningbrough, who at the time was based at Shipton in Yorkshire. Beningbrough went on to sire the Oaks Stakes winner Briseis and the Doncaster Cup winner Scud, who in turn sired The Derby winners Sailor and Sam. Orville's dam Evelina, also bred by Fitzwilliam, was a half-sister of the St Leger winner Pewett, and went on to produce the successful stallions Cervantes and Paulowitz.

== Racing career ==
=== 1801: two-year-old season ===
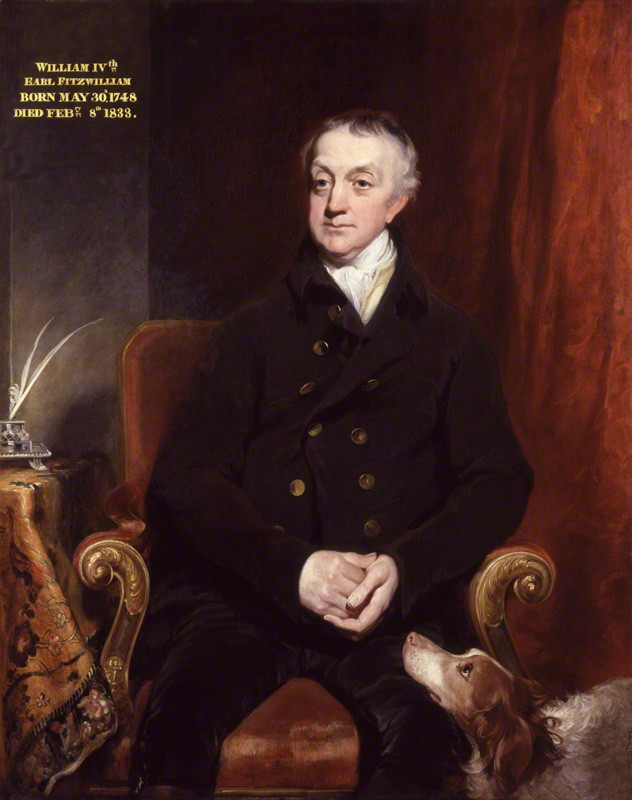
Lord Fitzwilliam, who bred Orville and owned him for his first four seasons of racing

Until 1913 there was no requirement for British racehorses to have official names (two-year-olds were allowed to race unnamed until 1946). The colt who became known as Orville raced unnamed in 1801, being described on his debut as "Ld Fitzwilliam's b.c. by Beningbrough, out of Evelina". At York Racecourse in August, the colt finished fourth of the five runners in a Sweepstakes. On 23 September Lord Fitzwilliam's colt recorded his first success when he won a race over one mile at Doncaster Racecourse in which he started the 4/5 favourite against four opponents.

=== 1802: three-year-old season ===
Orville made his first appearance as a three-year-old at York on 25 August. In a Sweepstakes over a distance of two miles he finished second to Mr Wardell's colt Sir John. Three days later, over the same course and distance he finished second of the four runners in another Sweepstakes, the race being won by the favourite, a colt named Peter.

A month later, Orville was one of seven colts to contest the St Leger Stakes at Doncaster Racecourse. He started at odds of 5/1 with Christopher Wilson's unnamed colt by Young Eclipse being made the 4/5 favourite. Orville's stable companion Sparrowhawk was the second choice in the betting at 5/2. Orville won the race from Pipylin, with Sparrowhawk in third place. Two days later, Orville ran in the weight-for-age Doncaster Cup over a distance of four miles. He finished second of the eight runners behind the four-year-old Alonzo.

=== 1803: four-year-old season ===
Orville failed to win in three starts in 1803. At York in May he finished second to Lennox in a two-mile Sweepstakes. At the same course in August he finished second to Duxbury in a four-mile race and second again when beaten by Mr Mellish's horse Stockton four days later.

=== 1804: five-year-old season ===
Orville began his five-year-old season by winning a two-mile Sweepstakes at York on 29 May. He returned to York in August when he finished last of the five runners behind Haphazard in a four-mile subscription race and second to R Garfoth's horse by Traveller in a similar event two days later. In September at Doncaster Orville won the two mile Free Handicap Sweepstakes and a four-mile match race against Mr Mellish's horse Stockton. In October, Orville was sent south to run at Newmarket where he finished second to Eleanor in a race over the four mile Beacon Course.

=== 1805: six-year-old season ===
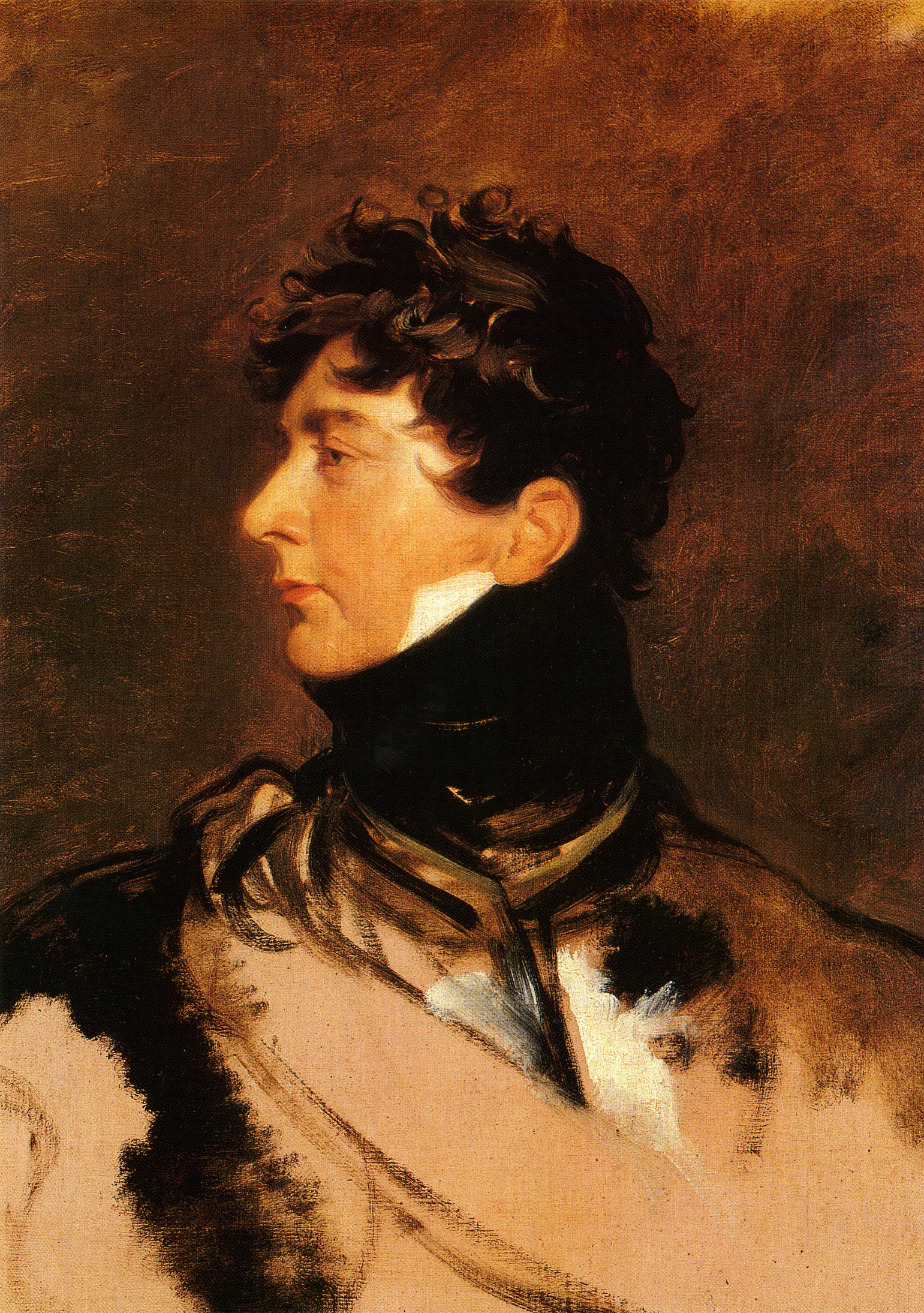
The Prince of Wales, who owned Orville from 1805

Before the start of the 1805 season, Orville was sold and entered into the ownership of the Prince of Wales. Following a dispute with the Jockey Club in 1791, the Prince's horses did not run at Newmarket: when Orville appeared at the course he was temporarily transferred to the ownership of Delme Radcliffe. On 27 July Orville ran his first race as a six-year-old in the four mile Somerset Stakes at Brighton Racecourse. He finished fourth but was declared the winner after the first three finishers were disqualified for "not having run the proper Course". Three days later, at the same course, Orville won the Brighton Gold Cup, beating Houghton Lass and two others. The cup for this race had been donated by the Prince of Wales, who was therefore the winner of his own trophy. At Lewes in August, Orville won a King's Plate in two four-mile heats, and a subscription race in which he defeated Walton. On 31 October, Orville again failed to show his best form at Newmarket, where he finished unplaced in a handicap race over the two mile "Ditch-In" course.

=== 1806: seven-year-old season ===
Orville began his sixth season by beating the St Leger winner Quiz over the Beacon Course at Newmarket in May. In the summer he finished third in the Somerset Stakes and then claimed two prizes at Lewes without having to race: Houghton Lass was scratched from a scheduled match race against Orville who also walked over in a Sweepstakes. Orville completed his season with three races at Newmarket in October. He defeated the Duke of Grafton's mare Parasol and the St Leger winner Staveley over the Beacon Course and then stepped down in distance to win a 200 guinea match against Mr Mellish's horse Sancho (another St Leger winner) over the Abington mile. On the same day as his match with Sancho he was then beaten by the five-year-old Bustard, conceding six pounds, in a four-mile subscription race.

=== 1807: eight-year-old season ===
Orville began his final season at Newmarket in March where he finished fourth in the Oatlands Stakes, a handicap race in which he carried top weight of 132 pounds. At the next meeting in April he won a Free Handicap Sweepstakes over the Beacon Course, conceding eight pounds to the Oaks winner Pelisse. In August Orville walked over for the Somerset Stakes at Brighton and then contested three events at Lewes. He won a match against Pelisse, a Sweepstakes, beating Cerberus and the Ladies' Plate in which he conceded forty-one pounds to a three-year-old colt named Brighton. Orville ended his career at Newmarket in autumn with two further wins beating Canopus in a subscription race over the Beacon Course on 28 September and Parasol in a similar event on 9 October.

== Stud record ==
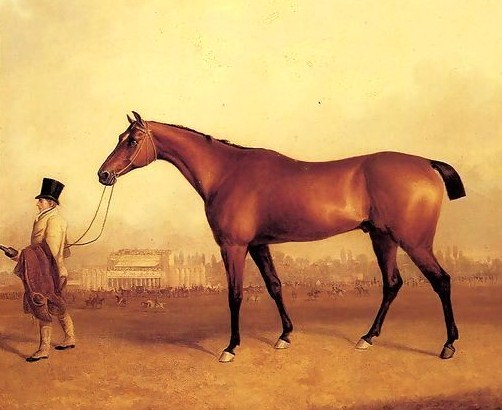
Orville's son Emilius, who emulated his sire by being Champion Sire on two occasions

Orville retired from racing to become a breeding stallion. He was initially based at Six Mile Bottom near Newmarket where he stood at a fee of 10 guineas, with a half-guinea for the groom. He moved to Newmarket the following year and was then sent north to stand in Yorkshire from 1810.

Orville was an immediate success at stud, siring the Derby winner Octavius from his first crop of foals. His other classic winners were Charlotte, Zoe, Ebor and Emilius. The last-named became a successful stallion, as did Andrew, the sire of Cadland, Pollio, the sire of Pussy, and Muley, the sire of Margrave, Vespa and Little Wonder. Orville was also the broodmare sire of the St Leger winners Birmingham and Jerry and the Oaks winners Songstress and Miss Letty. Orville was the Leading sire in Great Britain and Ireland in 1817 when his offspring won 41 races and £6,439 and again in 1823 with 22 races and £9,978.

Orville was euthanised in November 1826.

== Sire line tree ==
- Orville
  - Octavius
    - Little John
      - Frederick
      - Little John
        - Forester
        - Egremont
        - Merry Monarch
    - Black-and-all-black
    - Sir Huldibrand
    - Cricketer
  - Muley
    - Robin Hood
      - Black Comet
    - Morisco
      - Morris Dancer
      - Taurus
        - Boeotian
        - Ole Bull
        - Flambeau
        - Assassin
        - Buffalo
        - John O'Gaunt
        - Oakley
        - Minotaur
        - Minotaurus
        - Turnus
        - Salem
      - Zany
      - Cadet
        - George
    - Outlaw
      - Tamworth
    - Leviathan
      - Othello
        - Iago
        - Jumping Mullet
        - Argo
        - Corbia
      - Hugh L French
      - The Poney
      - Wacousta
      - Pete Whetstone
      - Boyd McNairy
      - John R Grymes
      - Outrage
      - Stanley
      - Tom Marshall
      - John Ross
      - Envoy
      - Black Satin
      - Ebony
      - Stafford
      - Capt Elgee
      - Jack Hays
    - Rector
    - Marvel
    - Margrave
      - Mulberry Wine
      - Perry
      - Lutzow
      - Blue Dick
      - Landscape
      - Gosport
      - Prince Albert
      - Tom Payne
      - Doubloon
      - Brown Dick
        - Gen Twiggs
      - Henry Perritt
    - Muley Moloch
      - Galaor
        - The Heir Of Linne
      - Middleham
      - Moloch
      - Pagan
      - Cattonite
      - Edmond
      - Teetotaller
      - Phenomenon
      - Punjaub
    - Dick
      - Arthur
    - Muleyson
    - Gil Blas
    - King Of Clubs
    - Gilbert Gurney
    - Dulcimer
    - The Little Known
      - Little Hastings
        - Lord Hastings
    - Drayton
      - Bourton
      - Emigrant
    - Gibraltar
    - Hautboy
    - Little Wonder
    - Snoozer
  - Belville
  - Dinmont
  - Fulford
  - Don Juan
  - Ebor
  - Fitz Orville
    - Windfall
  - Allegro
  - Master Henry
  - Andrew
    - Cadland
      - Arrow
      - The Prime Warden
        - Light
      - Nautilus
      - Romulus
  - Richard
  - Bizarre
    - Mus
      - Vampyre
  - Ganymede
  - Vargas
  - Pollio
  - Emilius
    - Agreeable
    - Priam
      - Chesterfield
        - The Hero
      - Monarch
        - Revenge
      - Prizeflower
      - Rubens
      - Scamander
      - Troilus
      - Bretby
      - Dey Of Algiers
      - Tros
        - Tros
      - Young Priam
      - Giges
        - Royal Quand-Meme
      - Regent
      - Bay Priam
      - Daniel Webster
      - Alexander
      - Lamar
      - Lambda
        - Bob Howard
    - Recovery
      - Retriever
      - Reprieve
    - St Nicholas
      - St Lawrence
        - Saucebox
      - St John
        - Little John
        - Plover
        - Union Jack
      - Yorkshire
        - Allendale
        - John Aiken
        - Kennett
        - Waterloo
        - Capt Beard
        - Austerlitz
        - Yorktown
        - Solferino
        - Lodi
      - Gasperoni
      - Longsight
        - Barton
      - Incognito
      - Lionel
      - Uriel
    - Tantivy
    - Chapman
    - Ciudad Rodrigo
    - Exile
    - Marcus
    - Riddlesworth
    - Sarpedon
      - Louis d'Or
    - Young Emilius
      - Renonce
      - Fitz Emilius
      - Amalfi
    - Hawker
    - Lucius
    - Mosquito
    - Plentipotentiary
      - Alexander
      - Ambassador
      - Envoy
      - Herold
        - Nuncio
      - Nuncio
        - First Born
        - Festival
        - Pedagogue
        - Valbruant
        - Black Prince
      - The Era
    - Coriolanus
    - Operator
      - Emilius
      - Figaro
        - Il Barbiere
    - Young Emilius
    - Mango
      - Portumnus
    - Riddlesworth
      - Clymeneus
      - Dainty Ariel
        - Kingfisher
        - Ariel
        - Hippocampus
      - Scud
        - Knottingley
    - The Steamer
    - Euclid
      - Bantam
        - Cockatoo
        - Zouave
    - Mercer
      - Traveller
    - Sovereign
      - Childe Harold
        - Peaks Of Otter
        - Slasher
        - Loyalty
        - Doswell
      - Mahomet
      - Charleston
      - Ruric
        - Terror
      - Sequin
      - Marengo
      - Mogul
      - Colossus
        - Jack Gambol
      - John Morgan
      - Prolific
    - Record
    - Theon
    - Pompey
      - Millionaire
    - The Caster
      - Wollaton
        - Toryboy
    - Elemi
    - Tragical
    - Mathematician
      - Monge
    - Gambetti

== Pedigree ==
Pedigree of Orville (GB), Bay stallion 1799
Sire Beningbrough (GB) 1791	King Fergus; 1775	Eclipse	Marske
Sire Beningbrough (GB) 1791	King Fergus; 1775	Eclipse	Spilletta
Sire Beningbrough (GB) 1791	King Fergus; 1775	Creeping Polly	Portmore's Othello
Sire Beningbrough (GB) 1791	King Fergus; 1775	Creeping Polly	Fanny^
Sire Beningbrough (GB) 1791	Fenwick's Herod mare 1780	Herod*	Tartar*^
Sire Beningbrough (GB) 1791	Fenwick's Herod mare 1780	Herod*	Cypron*
Sire Beningbrough (GB) 1791	Fenwick's Herod mare 1780	Pyrrha	Matchem
Sire Beningbrough (GB) 1791	Fenwick's Herod mare 1780	Pyrrha	Duchess
Dam Evelina (GB) 1791	Highflyer; 1774	Herod*	Tartar*^
Dam Evelina (GB) 1791	Highflyer; 1774	Herod*	Cypron*
Dam Evelina (GB) 1791	Highflyer; 1774	Rachel	Blank
Dam Evelina (GB) 1791	Highflyer; 1774	Rachel	Sister to South
Dam Evelina (GB) 1791	Termagant; 1772	Tantrum	Cripple
Dam Evelina (GB) 1791	Termagant; 1772	Tantrum	Childers mare
Dam Evelina (GB) 1791	Termagant; 1772	Cantatrice	Sampson
Dam Evelina (GB) 1791	Termagant; 1772	Cantatrice	Regulus mare (Family:8-a)

* Orville is inbred 3S x 3D to the stallion Herod, meaning that he appears third generation on the sire side of his pedigree and third generation on the dam side of his pedigree.

*^ Orville is inbred 5S x 4S x 4D to the stallion Tartar, meaning that he appears fifth generation (via Fanny)^ and fourth generation on the sire side of his pedigree and fourth generation on the dam side of his pedigree.
