= Wings (horse) =

British Thoroughbred racehorse

- Sire: The Flyer
- Grandsire: Vandyke Junior
- Dam: Oleander
- Damsire: Sir David
- Sex: Mare
- Foaled: 1822
- Country: United Kingdom of Great Britain and Ireland
- Colour: Chestnut
- Owner: Thomas Grosvenor

Major wins
- Epsom Oaks (1825); Epsom Gold Cup (1825); Stamford Gold Cup (1825)

Wings (1822–1842) was a British Thoroughbred racehorse that was the winner of 1825 Epsom Oaks. Her son Caravan won the Ascot Gold Cup in 1839 and her daughter Fiammetta won the French 2,000 Guineas.

== Background ==
Wings was bred by General Thomas Grosvenor and was foaled in 1822 at his stud.

== Racing career ==
=== 1825: three-year-old season ===
In April during the first start of her career, Wings finished second to Mr Batson's colt Hogarth in a sweepstakes race at Newmarket. In May, she won a Gold Cup against Picton and was sold to Chifney for 250 sovereigns.

=== Breeding career ===
Mr Stonehewer's stud was sold on 2 July 1832 and Wings was bought by Mr. Greatrex for 125 guineas. By 1834, Wings was sold to the King and relocated to the Hampton Court stud. On 25 October, the entire Hampton Court Stud was liquidated at Tattersall's. The Classic winners Wings (600 guineas), Young Mouse (360 guineas) and Fleur-de-lis (550 guineas) were bought by Auguste Lupin and exported to his stud farm in Saint-Cloud, France. Wings produced six colts, one filly and one foal of unrecorded sex in England. Wings died in 1842 at Lupin's stud after aborting her Lottery colt.

Wing's best racers were her 1834 colt Caravan and her 1838 French-born filly Fiammetta. Caravan was second in the 1837 Derby to Phosphorus and won the 1839 Ascot Gold Cup. Caravan was later exported to France as a breeding stallion. Fiammetta won the French 2,000 Guineas for Auguste Lupin, his first Classic win, but died in 1842 after dislocating a fetlock joint while running in the Pavilion Stakes at. Wing's 1837 colt Monops was blinded in one eye as a yearling due to an outbreak of "influenza" at the Hampton Court Stud shortly before the dispersal sale in 1837. As a result of the impairment, he was sold for only 46 guineas, but he could see well enough with one eye to withstand training and run, but not place, in the 1840 Derby.

==== Full progeny list ====
Foals produced in the United Kingdom include:

- 1829, Chestnut colt by Middleton
- 1830, Bay colt by Partisan
- 1831, Pigeon, bay colt by Reveller
- 1832, foal by Camel
- 1833, Bay filly by Brutandorf
- 1834, Caravan, brown colt by Camel
- 1836, Feather, chestnut colt by Actaeon
- 1837, Monops, chestnut colt by Actaeon

Foals produced in France include:

- 1838, Fiammetta, bay filly by Actaeon or Camel (imported in utero)
- 1839, Romanesca, bay filly by Lottery
- 1840, Bay filly by Lottery (died at weaning)
- 1841, Bengali, brown colt by Ibrahim
- 1842, aborted a bay colt by Lottery

== Pedigree ==
Pedigree of Wings (GB), Chestnut Mare, 1822
Sire The Flyer (GB) Brown, 1814	Vandyke Junior; 1808	Walton	Sir Peter Teazle
Sire The Flyer (GB) Brown, 1814	Vandyke Junior; 1808	Walton	Arethusa
Sire The Flyer (GB) Brown, 1814	Vandyke Junior; 1808	Dabchick	Potoooooooo
Sire The Flyer (GB) Brown, 1814	Vandyke Junior; 1808	Dabchick	Drab
Sire The Flyer (GB) Brown, 1814	Azalia; 1804	Beningbrough	King Fergus
Sire The Flyer (GB) Brown, 1814	Azalia; 1804	Beningbrough	Herod Mare (1780)
Sire The Flyer (GB) Brown, 1814	Azalia; 1804	Gilliflower	Highflyer
Sire The Flyer (GB) Brown, 1814	Azalia; 1804	Gilliflower	Preference
Dam Oleander (GB) 1813	Sir David; 1801	Trumpator	Conductor
Dam Oleander (GB) 1813	Sir David; 1801	Trumpator	Brunette
Dam Oleander (GB) 1813	Sir David; 1801	Woodpecker mare	Woodpecker
Dam Oleander (GB) 1813	Sir David; 1801	Woodpecker mare	Trentham mare
Dam Oleander (GB) 1813	Whiskey mare 1799	Whiskey	Saltram
Dam Oleander (GB) 1813	Whiskey mare 1799	Whiskey	Calash
Dam Oleander (GB) 1813	Whiskey mare 1799	Grey Dorimant	Dorimant
Dam Oleander (GB) 1813	Whiskey mare 1799	Grey Dorimant	Dizzy (Family 28)
