= Oriana (horse) =

British-bred Thoroughbred racehorse

- Sire: Beningbrough
- Grandsire: King Fergus
- Dam: Mary Ann
- Damsire: Sir Peter Teazle
- Sex: Mare
- Foaled: 1807
- Country: United Kingdom of Great Britain and Ireland
- Colour: Bay
- Owner: Sir William Gerard, 11th Baronet
- Trainer: William Peirse
- Record: 5: 2-2-1

Major wins
- Oaks Stakes (1810); 4yo Great Subscription Purse (1811)

Oriana (1807 – after 1826) was a British Thoroughbred racehorse and broodmare who won the classic Oaks Stakes at Epsom Downs Racecourse in 1810. The Northern-trained filly won the Oaks on her first appearance and finished third against colts in the St Leger Stakes at Doncaster in her only other race that year. She won one of her three races in 1811 and was later exported to become a broodmare in Ireland.

== Background ==
Oriana was a bay mare bred by her owner Sir William Gerard of Garswood in Lancashire. She was the ninth foal of Mary Ann, a mare bred by Mr Clifton. Mary Ann had previously produced Ashton, a successful stayer in the North of England whose wins included the Richmond Gold Cup. Oriana was sired by the St Leger winner Beningbrough, who at the time was based at Middleham in Yorkshire. Beningbrough also sired the Oaks winner Briseis, the outstanding stayer and stallion Orville and the Doncaster Cup winner Scud, who in turn sired The Derby winners Sailor and Sam.

Gerard sent the filly into training with William "Billy" Peirse of Bedale in Yorkshire.

== Racing career ==
=== 1810: three-year-old season ===
Oriana made her racecourse debut in the Oaks Stakes at Epsom on 8 June 1810. Eleven fillies, from an original entry of thirty-three appeared for the race over one and a half miles. Oriana was ridden in the race by her trainer, Billy Peirse and despite her lack of previous experience started the 4/1 second favourite behind Lord Foley's filly Pirouette (or Peronette). Oriana won "a fine race" from Pirouette, with Lord Grosvenor's Donna Clara in third place. The winning owner's prize of 950 guineas equaled the highest for the race up to that time.

On 24 September Oriana appeared at Doncaster Racecourse for the St Leger Stakes over one and three quarter miles. She was made the 11/8 favourite in a field of eleven runners comprising eight colts and three fillies. She finished third to the Duke of Leeds' colt Octavian, and Major Wheatley's colt Recollection.

=== 1811: four-year-old season ===
On 30 April 1811, Oriana made her first appearance as a four-year-old at Newmarket's First Spring meeting. In the Claret Stakes over the two mile Ditch-In course she started at odds of 7/2 and finished second to Mr Payne's colt Crispin with Pirouette in fifth place. At the next Newmarket meeting, Oriana was beaten by Lord Oxford's six-year-old horse Poulton in a 100 Guinea match race over ten furlongs.

Oriana's last race took place at York Racecourse on 23 August. She was one of four runners for a race over four miles for "one-third of the Great Subscription" with an additional £50 contributed by the City of York. Oriana started the 8/11 favourite and won from Mr Duncombe's filly Zephyr.

== Stud record ==
Oriana was retired form racing to become a broodmare. According to the General Stud Book, she was exported to Ireland to the stud of Lord Rossmore in County Monaghan. She produced seven colts and four fillies between 1813 and 1826 to the cover of several stallions including Tiresias, Catton and Musician. Her last four foals were bred by the Duke of Portland and Mr. Thompson and there is no record of her produce after 1826. She was listed as "Dead" in the third edition of the stud book first published in 1831.

== Pedigree ==
Pedigree of Oriana (GB), Bay mare 1807
Sire Beningbrough (GB) 1791	King Fergus; 1775	Eclipse	Marske
Sire Beningbrough (GB) 1791	King Fergus; 1775	Eclipse	Spilletta
Sire Beningbrough (GB) 1791	King Fergus; 1775	Creeping Polly	Portmore's Othello
Sire Beningbrough (GB) 1791	King Fergus; 1775	Creeping Polly	Fanny
Sire Beningbrough (GB) 1791	Fenwick's Herod mare 1780	Herod	Tartar
Sire Beningbrough (GB) 1791	Fenwick's Herod mare 1780	Herod	Cypron
Sire Beningbrough (GB) 1791	Fenwick's Herod mare 1780	Pyrrha	Matchem
Sire Beningbrough (GB) 1791	Fenwick's Herod mare 1780	Pyrrha	Duchess
Dam Mary Ann (GB) 1791	Sir Peter Teazle; 1784	Highflyer	Herod
Dam Mary Ann (GB) 1791	Sir Peter Teazle; 1784	Highflyer	Rachel
Dam Mary Ann (GB) 1791	Sir Peter Teazle; 1784	Papillon	Snap
Dam Mary Ann (GB) 1791	Sir Peter Teazle; 1784	Papillon	Miss Cleveland
Dam Mary Ann (GB) 1791	Young Marske mare	Young Marske	Marske
Dam Mary Ann (GB) 1791	Young Marske mare	Young Marske	Blank mare
Dam Mary Ann (GB) 1791	Young Marske mare	Matchem mare	Matchem
Dam Mary Ann (GB) 1791	Young Marske mare	Matchem mare	Tarquin mare (Family:18)

- Oriana was inbred 3 × 4 to Herod, meaning that this stallion appears in both the third and fourth generations of her pedigree. She was also inbred 4 × 4 to both Marske and Matchem.
