= Briseis (British horse) =

British-bred Thoroughbred racehorse

- Sire: Beningbrough
- Grandsire: King Fergus
- Dam: Lady Jane
- Damsire: Sir Peter Teazle
- Sex: Mare
- Foaled: 1804
- Country: United Kingdom of Great Britain and Ireland
- Colour: Bay
- Owner: Thomas Grosvenor
- Trainer: Robert Robson
- Record: 6: 3-1-0

Major wins
- Match against Superstition (1807); Oaks Stakes (1807)

Briseis (1804–1824) was a British Thoroughbred racehorse and broodmare who won the classic Oaks Stakes at Epsom Downs Racecourse in 1807. Her win in the Oaks was her third win from as many starts, but she was beaten in her remaining three races before being retired from racing in 1808. At stud she proved to be a successful broodmare, producing several good winners including the dual classic winner Corinne. The mare's name was often spelled Briseïs.

== Background ==
Briseis was a bay mare bred by her owner Thomas Grosvenor a cousin of Robert Grosvenor, 1st Marquess of Westminster. Thomas Grosvenor was a career soldier who eventually attained the rank of Field Marshal: during Briseis' racing career he was usually referred to as General Grosvenor. Briseis was sired by the St Leger winner Beningbrough, who at the time was based at Middleham in Yorkshire. Beningbrough also sired the Oaks winner Oriana, the outstanding stayer and stallion Orville and the Doncaster Cup winner Scud, who in turn sired The Derby winners Sailor and Sam.

== Racing career ==
=== 1807: three-year-old season ===
Until 1913 there was no requirement for British racehorses to have official names (two-year-olds were allowed to race unnamed until 1946). The filly who would become known as Briseis was scheduled to make her debut as "Gen. Grosvenor's b. f. by Beningbrough out of Lady Jane" in a 100 guinea match race on 2 April at the Craven meeting at Newmarket Racecourse. She did not have to compete, however, as her opponent, a filly named Sour Crout, did not appear for the race over the Rowley Mile. On 13 April at Newmarket's First Spring Meeting General Grosvenor's filly, now officially named Briseis had her first competitive race against a four-year-old colt named Superstition. Receiving two stones from her opponent, and ridden by "a boy of Mr Mellish's", she won the race over the Ancaster Mile course to win a prize of 100 guineas. Two days later at the same course, Briseis won a Sweepstakes over ten furlongs when she defeated the Duke of St Albans' filly Morgiana for 50 guineas after "a good race". On 15 May, Briseis was one of thirteen fillies, from an original entry of thirty-one to contest the Oaks Stakes over one and a half miles at Epsom. Mr Howorth's filly Lauretta was made favourite, with Briseis being relatively unfancied and starting at odds of 15/1. Ridden by Sam Chifney, Jr., Briseis took the lead after a mile and won the classic by half a length from Margaret, with Pantina third and Lauretta finishing unplaced.

Briseis did not race again in 1807, although she had been entered in a number of match races. Grosvenor was forced to pay forfeits when his filly failed to appear in five races at Newmarket in October.

=== 1808: four-year-old season ===
Briseis stayed in training as a four-year-old but did not appear on the racecourse until summer. On 10 August she contested the Gold Cup over two miles at Nottingham Racecourse in which she sustained her first defeat in a competitive race when finishing second of the six runners behind a horse named Gustavus (not the Derby winner). At Leicester in September, Briseis finished unplaced in the local Gold Cup and in a Sweepstakes over four miles. General Grosvenor again had to pay forfeit when Briseis failed to appear in three match races at Newmarket later that year.

== Stud record ==
Briseis was retired from racing to become a broodmare for General Grosvenor, probably based at the Eaton stud of his cousin Lord Grosvenor. During her fourteen-year stud career she produced eleven live foals (all of them bay or brown) for leading owners including John Udney, Thomas Thornhill and the Duke of Grafton. Her third foal was The Student, sired by Dick Andrews a successful racehorse who started favourite for the 1817 Derby and later became a stallion in Germany. A year late she produced the filly Corinne, by Waxy, who won eight races including the 1000 Guineas and the Oaks. Her next foal was Blue Stockings, by Popinjay, a filly whose wins included the Riddlesworth Stakes, at that time regarded as equal in importance to the classics. In 1817 Briseis produced her fourth consecutive top-class runner in Abjer, by Truffle, a colt whose only career defeat came when he finished second in the Derby. Briseis died in 1824, four days after giving birth to a dead foal by The Flyer.

== Pedigree ==
Pedigree of Briseis (GB), Bay mare 1804
Sire Beningbrough (GB) 1791	King Fergus; 1775	Eclipse	Marske
Sire Beningbrough (GB) 1791	King Fergus; 1775	Eclipse	Spilletta
Sire Beningbrough (GB) 1791	King Fergus; 1775	Creeping Polly	Portmore's Othello
Sire Beningbrough (GB) 1791	King Fergus; 1775	Creeping Polly	Fanny
Sire Beningbrough (GB) 1791	Fenwick's Herod mare 1780	Herod	Tartar
Sire Beningbrough (GB) 1791	Fenwick's Herod mare 1780	Herod	Cypron
Sire Beningbrough (GB) 1791	Fenwick's Herod mare 1780	Pyrrha	Matchem
Sire Beningbrough (GB) 1791	Fenwick's Herod mare 1780	Pyrrha	Duchess
Dam Lady Jane (GB) 1796	Sir Peter Teazle; 1784	Highflyer	Herod
Dam Lady Jane (GB) 1796	Sir Peter Teazle; 1784	Highflyer	Rachel
Dam Lady Jane (GB) 1796	Sir Peter Teazle; 1784	Papillon	Snap
Dam Lady Jane (GB) 1796	Sir Peter Teazle; 1784	Papillon	Miss Cleveland
Dam Lady Jane (GB) 1796	Paulina; 1778	Florizel	Herod
Dam Lady Jane (GB) 1796	Paulina; 1778	Florizel	Cygnet mare
Dam Lady Jane (GB) 1796	Paulina; 1778	Captive	Matchem
Dam Lady Jane (GB) 1796	Paulina; 1778	Captive	Calliope (Family:2)
