= 1818 in sports =

1818 in sports describes the year's events in world sport.

== Boxing ==
Events

- Tom Cribb retains his English championship but no fights involving him are recorded in 1818.

== Cricket ==
Events

- Leading English player George Osbaldeston strikes his name from the MCC members list in anger. He later repents and tries to restore himself but his application is blocked by his enemy, Lord Frederick Beauclerk. Osbaldeston can no longer play at Lord's and that effectively ends his first-class career.

England

- Most runs – Billy Beldham 103 (HS 49)
- Most wickets – Thomas Howard 14 (BB 5–?)

== Horse racing ==
England

- 1,000 Guineas Stakes – Corinne
- 2,000 Guineas Stakes – Interpreter
- The Derby – Sam
- The Oaks – Corinne
- St. Leger Stakes – Reveller

== Rowing ==
Events

- Leander Club is founded by the merger of The Star and Arrow boat clubs in London
