= Corinne (horse) =

British-bred Thoroughbred racehorse

- Sire: Waxy
- Grandsire: Potoooooooo
- Dam: Briseis
- Damsire: Beningbrough
- Sex: Mare
- Foaled: 1815
- Country: United Kingdom of Great Britain and Ireland
- Colour: Brown
- Breeder: Thomas Grosvenor
- Owner: John Udney
- Trainer: Robert Robson
- Record: 18:8-4-2
- Earnings: £4,490

Major wins
- Match against Screw (1818); 1000 Guineas (1818); Epsom Oaks (1818); Match against Steeltrap (1818); King's Purse (1820); Chelmsford Gold Cup (1820)

Corinne (1815–after 1833) was a British Thoroughbred racehorse and broodmare, which in 1818 became the second filly to win both the 1000 Guineas at Newmarket Racecourse and the Oaks at Epsom Downs Racecourse. In a racing career which lasted from April 1818 until August 1820 she ran eighteen times and won eight races.

== Background ==
Corinne was a brown mare bred by Thomas Grosvenor at the Eaton Hall stud in Cheshire which was owned by his cousin Robert Grosvenor, 1st Marquess of Westminster. Her dam Briseis, had won the Oaks in the Grosvenor colours in 1807 and became a successful broodmare: apart from Corinne she produced The Student, beaten favourite in the 1817 Derby and Abjer, second in the same race three years later. Corinne was sired by the 1790 Epsom Derby winner Waxy, who became an influential and important stallion, siring two additional Oaks winners and four winners of the Derby. Before her racing career began, Corinne was sold to Colonel John Udney. an Aberdeen-born soldier and diplomat who was a prominent member of the Jockey Club. Udney sent the filly to be trained at Newmarket by Robert Robson, the so-called "Emperor of Trainers".

== Racing career ==
=== 1818: three-year-old season ===
Corinne made her first appearance on 17 April at the Newmarket Craven meeting. Racing over the Ditch Mile course, she won a 200 guinea match race against Mr Thornhill's colt Screw, which started 4/7 favourite. On 1 May, at the next Newmarket meeting, Corinne started the 7/1 third choice in the betting in a field of eight fillies for the 1000 Guineas Stakes, which despite its name, carried a prize of 1,400 guineas. Ridden by Francis Buckle, Corinne won the race, defeating the favourite Loo, a filly owned by the Duke of Grafton.

On 29 May Corinne was moved up in distance to contest the Oaks Stakes over one and a half miles at Epsom Downs Racecourse. Starting the 5/2 second favourite she won the first prize of 2,250 guineas from Fay, with the favourite Fanny in third, thereby emulating the achievement of Neva who won both the 1000 Guineas and the Oaks in 1817. On her next run, Corinne was matched against colts in the Tent Stakes over the New Mile course at Ascot Racecourse on 9 June. She finished second to Prince Paul (the beaten favourite in The Derby), a place ahead of the 2000 Guineas winner Interpreter.

After a summer break, Corinne returned to action at the Newmarket First October meeting, where she won a 200 guinea match over ten furlongs against Mr Thornhill's colt Steeltrap, carrying six pounds more than her rival. At the Second October meeting two weeks later, Corinne claimed a further 40 guineas for her owner, when her scheduled opponent (an unnamed colt owned by Mr Lake) failed to appear for a match race over the Abington Mile. Four days later, over the same course and distance, Corinne took part in a match between classic winners in which she failed to concede a pound in weight to the colt Interpreter.

=== 1819: four-year-old season ===
All of Corinne's races in 1819 took place at Newmarket. In April Corinne ran at the Craven meeting where she contested the two-mile Claret Stakes. She started the outsider of the three runners and finished second to the colt Allegro ahead of Sam (the 1818 Derby winner). Later that month the filly finished unplaced behind Lord Grosvenor's filly Finesse in a three-mile King's Plate. In these races Corinne was described as a three-year-old: until 1834 horses in Britain had their ages advanced by a year on 1 May rather than 1 January.

Corinne did not race again until autumn when she ran in the Garden Stakes at the First October meeting. She finished last of the four finishers behind the four-year-old filly Advance. At the Houghton meeting on 2 November Corinne contested a spring handicap race over five furlongs in which she finished third of the four runners behind the three-year-old colt Barmecide. Four days later at the same meeting Corinne recorded her first win for over a year in a 60 guinea handicap race over the three and a half mile Round Course. Carrying 102 pounds she started a 10/1 outsider in a field of six runners and won from a three-year-old colt named Zadig.

=== 1820: five-year-old season ===
In the spring of 1820, Corinne was sent to be covered by the stallion Castrel and raced in foal (pregnant) in her final year of competition. She made her seasonal debut on 18 April at the Newmarket Second Spring Meeting where she finished second to a colt name Ranter in a three-mile race for a £50 prize. Later the same day she took part in a King's Purse for fillies and mares, also over three miles, in which she finished unplaced behind the 1819 Oaks winner Shoveler. Her busy schedule continued as she was entered in another King's Purse over three and a half miles two days later. Carrying 154 pounds, she started at odds of 4/1 and won the 100 guinea prize "quite easy" from Lord Warwick's colt Wouvermans. Corinne ran two weeks later at the Second Spring Meeting, finishing fifth of the six runners behind Phoenix in a ten furlong handicap. On this occasion she carried top weight of 126 pounds, eighteen pounds more than the winner.

In July 1820, Corinne was campaigned away from Newmarket for the first time in more than two years as she appeared at a meeting at Chelmsford in Essex. On the first day of the meeting she contested a King's Purse for fillies and mares which was run in a series of two-mile heats, the winner being the first horse to win twice. Corinne won the first heat but was beaten in the second by Lord Clarendon's unnamed three-year-old filly (later named Antiope). In the deciding heat Corinne finished second again as the Clarendon filly won "rather easy". On the following day, Corinne ran against eight opponents in the three mile Chelmsford Gold Cup. She won by a length from the favourite, a colt called Andrew, to whom she was conceding five pounds. In August, Corinne won a £50 race at Swaffham when her only rival, a mare named Creeping Jane, was disqualified.

== Stud career ==
After her retirement from racing, Corinne was sold as a broodmare to William Lowther, 1st Earl of Lonsdale. She foaled a colt by Castrel, named Silkworm, the spring after her retirement from racing in 1821. She produced five colts and four fillies for Lord Lowther between 1821 and 1831. Corinne was sold to Baron Biel and was exported in foal to Partisan to Weitendorf, Germany in 1832. The resulting 1833 Partisan foal died at birth. Several of Corinne's female offspring, including the Partisan Mare (foaled in 1828), Francine, and Corinne sired by Truffle were also exported to Germany. Corinne was bred to several leading stallions including Castrel, Comus and Tiresias, but does not appear to have produced any top class runners.

== Pedigree ==
Pedigree of Corinne (GB), brown mare, 1815
Sire Waxy (GB) 1790	Pot-8-Os; 1773	Eclipse	Marske
Sire Waxy (GB) 1790	Pot-8-Os; 1773	Eclipse	Spilletta
Sire Waxy (GB) 1790	Pot-8-Os; 1773	Sportsmistress	Sportsman
Sire Waxy (GB) 1790	Pot-8-Os; 1773	Sportsmistress	Golden Locks
Sire Waxy (GB) 1790	Maria; 1777	Herod	Tartar
Sire Waxy (GB) 1790	Maria; 1777	Herod	Cypron
Sire Waxy (GB) 1790	Maria; 1777	Lisette	Snap
Sire Waxy (GB) 1790	Maria; 1777	Lisette	Miss Windsor
Dam Briseis (GB) 1804	Beningbrough; 1791	King Fergus	Eclipse
Dam Briseis (GB) 1804	Beningbrough; 1791	King Fergus	Polly
Dam Briseis (GB) 1804	Beningbrough; 1791	Herod mare	Herod
Dam Briseis (GB) 1804	Beningbrough; 1791	Herod mare	Pyrrha
Dam Briseis (GB) 1804	Lady Jane; 1796	Sir Peter Teazle	Highflyer
Dam Briseis (GB) 1804	Lady Jane; 1796	Sir Peter Teazle	Papillon
Dam Briseis (GB) 1804	Lady Jane; 1796	Paulina	Florizel
Dam Briseis (GB) 1804	Lady Jane; 1796	Paulina	Captive

- Corinne was inbred 3 × 4 to Herod and 3 × 4 to Eclipse, meaning that these stallions appear in both the third and fourth generations of her pedigree.
