= Pussy (horse) =

British Thoroughbred racehorse

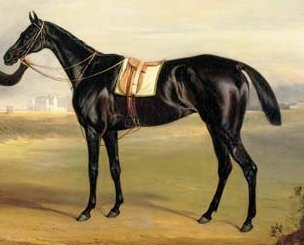
- Pussy in an 1834 painting by John E. Ferneley
- Sire: Pollio
- Grandsire: Orville
- Dam: Valve
- Damsire: Bob Booty
- Sex: Mare
- Foaled: 1831
- Country: United Kingdom of Great Britain and Ireland
- Colour: Brown
- Breeder: Mr. Lechmere Charlton
- Owner: Thomas Cosby
- Trainer: W. E. Day
- Record: 25: 8-7-6

Major wins
- Epsom Oaks (1834); Ascot Derby (1834)

Pussy (1831 – after 1852) was a Thoroughbred racehorse that won the 1834 Epsom Oaks. In a racing career that lasted from 1833 until 1837, Pussy started 25 times winning eight races. She initially raced under Thomas Cosby's name and was sold in 1835 to Lord Bentinck but raced under the Duke of Richmond's name. Pussy was retired to Bentinck's stud in 1837 but did not produce any noteworthy offspring. She was sold at auction in 1846, and her last foal was born in 1848.

== Background ==
Pussy was bred by Mr. Lechmere Charlton and was foaled in 1831 near Ludford Park in Shropshire. Pussy's sire, Pollio, stood for 10 sovereigns at the Ludford Stud Farm near Ludlow and was described by the Racing Calendar as a "beautiful dark brown, without white, nearly 16 hands high, with very great bone and power". Pussy's dam, Valve, was bred by the Marquess of Sligo and was foaled in Ireland in 1820. Valve's dam, Wire, was a full-sister to the Derby winners Whisker and Whalebone and was a successful racehorse in England and Ireland. Pussy was Valve's fourth foal and the first of two foals sired by Pollio, with Pussy's full-sister Griselda foaled in 1832. Griselda was sold to H. Bland and exported to Belgium in 1835. A half-brother to Pussy, The Steamer (sired by Emilius), was a noted sire of hunters after his racing career "was foiled by his bad legs".

Pussy was a "very dark brown mare, almost black" with "remarkably fine" action. Pussy was sold by Mr. Shackel for £80 "in [a] low and ragged condition" to Thomas Cosby. Pussy was trained at Danebury by William Day, the brother of Pussy's regular jockey John Barham Day. Pussy did not train well as a yearling or two-year-old and was noted as having gone "amiss all the summer of 1833".

== Racing career ==
=== 1833: two-year-old season ===
In June at Ascot, Pussy received a forfeiture from Mr. Ricardo's filly Ellen, and a few days later, was third to the filly Louisa and the colt Comet in a 210-sovereign sweepstakes race. At Goodwood in July, Pussy was beaten in a match race by Mr. Kent's filly Baleine. Thomas Henry Taunton, the author of Portraits of celebrated racehorses of the past and present, noted that Pussy was "sadly out of condition at this time." Pussy won a 100-guinea sweepstakes race against General Grosvenor's horse "Dick" and was second to a filly sired by Merlin in the Nursery Handicap run in October at the Houghton Meeting.

=== 1834: three-year-old season ===
On 20 May at Epsom, Pussy ran in the Oaks Stakes against fourteen other horses. The start of the race was delayed for half an hour owing to Mr. Walker's filly Cotillion (the betting favourite) having a "skittish temperament" and trying to jump over the starting rope, which "gave great delight to the spectators." The pacesetter was Lord Jersey's filly Nell Gwynne who maintained the lead until the first turn when she was passed by Colonel Peel's entry Rosalie. Rosalie tired at "the corner" and was overtaken by Mr. Forth's Louisa. Lord Berners's entry May-Day broke her leg and fell after "pulling hard" to outrun Louisa and was euthanised on the racetrack shortly after the race. Pussy overtook Louisa "halfway up the distance" and won by "more than a length" uncontested by Louisa. Louisa finished second followed by "W. Richardson's bay filly by Young Phantom" (later named Lady de Gros) in third. Taunton notes "But for [May-Day's] accident, Pussy might have not returned the winner." In June at Ascot, Pussy won the inaugural 500-sovereign Ascot Derby against three other horses including the betting favorite and former Oaks rival Louisa. Commentary in New Sporting Magazine asserted that "Pussy was on her own ground and won with even greater ease than she did at Epsom." Pussy's full-sister Griselda won the race by 20 lengths the following year in what was described by the Earl of Errol as something that could "scarcely be called a race", being "more like a hunt".

=== 1835: four-year-old season ===
On 16 June at Ascot, Pussy walked over for the Oatlands Stakes, was second to the colt Lucifer in the His Majesty's Plate held the same day and was unplaced for the Gold Cup the next day. Pussy was third in the Oxfordshire Stakes held 18 August, losing to the colt Paris and the horse Revenge. She won the Egham Stakes against Mr. Martyn's Pincher and at the Second October Meeting at Newmarket was unplaced in the Handicap Plate. Pussy finished the season with a win in a 100-sovereign Handicap Plate, beating Tramp and Lucifer, "winning by a length, without turning a hair." Lord Bentinck purchased Pussy from Mr. Cosby in late 1835, but the mare was registered and raced in the Duke of Richmond's name.

=== 1836: five-year-old season ===
On 4 April at the Craven Meeting, Pussy finished third to the colts Redshank and Coriolanus in the Craven Stakes. At Newmarket a few weeks later, Pussy was second to Mr. Forth's mare Famine in the King's Plate. Pussy was beaten by the colts Knobstick and Jacob Faithful for the gold Cup Stakes run in May at Epsom. At Reigate, Pussy was third for the Gold Cup, losing to Colonel Peel's Jacob Faithful and Mr. Robertson's gelding Olympic. Pussy was unplaced for the Goodwood Stakes and the Duke of Richmond's Plate of £100 run at Goodwood in July and the Brighton Stakes. At Egham on 23 August, Pussy finished second to the colt Lucifer in a gold cup race, was third in the Surrey and Middlesex Stakes and won the Egham Stakes. Pussy won the Rockingham Stakes held at Rochester on 6 September, running against one other horse.

=== 1837: six-year-old season ===
On 24 April at Newmarket, Lord Suffield's colt Alfred beat Pussy in a match race. The next day at the same meeting, Pussy won the King's Plate, beating three other mares. In the last start of her racing career, Pussy finished second in the Jockey Club Plate to the colt Calmuck. She was then "put to the stud." In horseman George Tattersall's opinion, Pussy "fairly earned the character of an industrious mare though [she was] scarcely entitled to the name and fame of a good or fortunate racer."

== Stud career ==
Pussy was retired to Lord Bentinck's stud in 1837. Pussy was sold on 14 September 1846 at Doncaster for 185 guineas. Pussy was purchased by Anton Ritter v. Myslowski and exported to Poland in November 1847. Pussy produced ten foals between 1839 and 1850.

== Pedigree ==
Pedigree of Pussy (GB), Brown filly, 1831
Sire Pollio (GB) 1823	Orville; 1799	Beningbrough	King Fergus
Sire Pollio (GB) 1823	Orville; 1799	Beningbrough	Fenwicks Herod Mare
Sire Pollio (GB) 1823	Orville; 1799	Evelina	Highflyer
Sire Pollio (GB) 1823	Orville; 1799	Evelina	Termangant
Sire Pollio (GB) 1823	Blue Stockings; 1816	Popinjay	Buzzard
Sire Pollio (GB) 1823	Blue Stockings; 1816	Popinjay	Boudrow Mare
Sire Pollio (GB) 1823	Blue Stockings; 1816	Briseis	Beningbrough
Sire Pollio (GB) 1823	Blue Stockings; 1816	Briseis	Lady Jane
Dam Valve (IRE) 1820	Bob Booty; 1804	Chanticleer	Woodpecker
Dam Valve (IRE) 1820	Bob Booty; 1804	Chanticleer	Eclipse Mare
Dam Valve (IRE) 1820	Bob Booty; 1804	Ierne	Bagot
Dam Valve (IRE) 1820	Bob Booty; 1804	Ierne	Gamahoe Mare
Dam Valve (IRE) 1820	Wire; 1811	Waxy	Pot-8-Os
Dam Valve (IRE) 1820	Wire; 1811	Waxy	Maria
Dam Valve (IRE) 1820	Wire; 1811	Penelope	Trumpator
Dam Valve (IRE) 1820	Wire; 1811	Penelope	Prunella
