= Young Mouse =

British-bred Thoroughbred racehorse

- Sire: Godolphin
- Grandsire: Partisan
- Dam: Mouse
- Damsire: Sir David
- Sex: Mare
- Foaled: 1826
- Country: United Kingdom
- Colour: Bay
- Breeder: Lord George Cavendish
- Owner: Lord George Cavendish
- Trainer: Dixon Boyce
- Record: 6:3-1-0

Major wins
- 1000 Guineas (1829); Match against Xarifa (1829); Match against Bobadilla (1829)

Young Mouse (1826–1843) was a British Thoroughbred racehorse and broodmare who won the sixteenth running of the classic 1000 Guineas at Newmarket Racecourse in 1829. In a racing career which lasted from May 1829 until July 1830 the filly ran six times and won three races. Young Mouse won the 1000 Guineas on her first competitive appearance and then ran unplaced in the Oaks Stakes before winning two match races at Newmarket in autumn. She was retired from racing after a single, unsuccessful run as a four-year-old. Young Mouse was later exported to France where she had some success as a broodmare.

== Background ==
Young Mouse was a bay mare bred by her owner Lord George Cavendish. Both of Young Mouse's parents were successful racehorses who ran in Cavendish's ownership: her sire Godolphin won the Craven Stakes at Newmarket in 1822, whilst her dam Mouse won several races and finished second to Minuet in the Oaks Stakes in 1815.

Until 1913 there was no requirement for British racehorses to have official names (two-year-olds were allowed to race unnamed until 1946). The filly known in retrospect as Young Mouse was never officially named during her racing career and was usually known by a descriptive title such as "the Mouse filly", "Lord Cavendish's filly" or simply as "Mouse". The name "Young Mouse" was used for the horse during her time as a broodmare.

== Racing career ==
=== 1829: three-year-old season ===
Young Mouse (identified in the Racing Calendar as Ld G. H. Cavendish's b. f. by Godolphin, out of Mouse) began her racing career at Newmarket's First Spring meeting. On 4 May, the opening day of the meeting, she claimed a 500 guinea prize without having to race, when her opponent, a filly named Tancreda, was withdrawn from a scheduled match over five furlongs. Three days later, the filly was one of four runners for the 1000 Guineas Stakes over the Ditch Mile course. Favouritism for the race was disputed by Mr Payne's filly Pauline who started at odds of 11/8 and Lord Exeter's Green Mantle on 6/4; the presence of these two well-regarded fillies appeared to have frightened away most of the opposition. Young Mouse's odds were not recorded in the Racing Calendar, but the Sporting Magazine gave her odds as 20/1. Ridden by William Arnull, Cavendish's filly created an upset by winning the race by less than a length from Green Mantle, with Pauline finishing in third place after a "true run race". A month after her classic win "Mouse" was moved up in distance for the Oaks Stakes over one and a half miles at Epsom Downs Racecourse. She started the 9/2 second favourite in a field of fourteen fillies but finished unplaced behind Green Mantle.

Young Mouse did not race again until autumn when she appeared on the second day of the Newmarket "First October" meeting, which actually took place on 29 September. Ridden by Arnull she contested a match race against Mr Greville's filly Xarifa in which she carried twelve pounds more than her rival. "Mouse" won the five furlong race by a head after a "severe struggle" to claim a prize of 200 guineas. Another success in a 200 guinea match race followed at the Second October meeting when she beat the four-year-old Bobadilla (who had been favoured in the betting) over the Ditch Mile course. According to the Sporting Magazine "Mouse" led all the way and won "hard held" by her jockey Patrick Conolly. On 31 October, the last day of the Newmarket season Young Mouse was beaten in a ten furlong match by Lucetta, a filly who went on to win the Ascot Gold Cup in 1830.

=== 1830: four-year-old season ===
Young Mouse (still officially unnamed), stayed in training as a four-year-old, but did not race until the July meeting at Newmarket. On the second day of the meeting she was assigned a weight of 114 pounds in a handicap race over a distance of one and three quarter miles. She was not among the favourites and finished unplaced behind Tranby, a colt owned by John Gully. Young Mouse never raced again.

== Stud record ==
Young Mouse was retired from racing to become a broodmare initially for her breeder the Earl of Burlington. After the Earl's death in 1834, she was seized as a heriot by the landlord of one of the Earl's rented estates. She was sold to King William IV in 1834 for 135 guineas and was relocated to the Hampton Court Stud. Young Mouse produced six foals in the United Kingdom, including the versatile colt Rat-trap (who died in 1839) and the future stallion Mus. Hampton Court was liquidated in October 1837 at the death of William IV and the ascension of his successor, Queen Victoria. Young Mouse was bought for £360 by the French sportsman Auguste Lupin who also bought Wings and Fleur-de-lis at the sale. All three mares were exported to France in late 1837. For Lupin, she produced Angora, a colt sired by Lottery, who finished second in the 1842 Prix du Jockey Club. She produced two fillies and four colts in France and died in late 1843 while seven months in foal.

== Pedigree ==
Pedigree of Young Mouse (GB), bay mare, 1826
| Sire Godolphin (GB) 1818 | Partisan; 1811 | Walton | Sir Peter Teazle |
| Sire Godolphin (GB) 1818 | Partisan; 1811 | Walton | Arethusa |
| Sire Godolphin (GB) 1818 | Partisan; 1811 | Parasol | Potoooooooo |
| Sire Godolphin (GB) 1818 | Partisan; 1811 | Parasol | Prunella |
| Sire Godolphin (GB) 1818 | Ridicule; 1810 | Shuttle | Young Marske |
| Sire Godolphin (GB) 1818 | Ridicule; 1810 | Shuttle | Vauxhall Snap mare |
| Sire Godolphin (GB) 1818 | Ridicule; 1810 | Dungannon mare | Dungannon |
| Sire Godolphin (GB) 1818 | Ridicule; 1810 | Dungannon mare | Letitia |
| Dam Mouse (GB) 1812 | Sir David; 1801 | Trumpator | Conductor |
| Dam Mouse (GB) 1812 | Sir David; 1801 | Trumpator | Brunette |
| Dam Mouse (GB) 1812 | Sir David; 1801 | Woodpecker mare | Woodpecker |
| Dam Mouse (GB) 1812 | Sir David; 1801 | Woodpecker mare | Trentham mare |
| Dam Mouse (GB) 1812 | Louisa; 1800 | Ormond | King Fergus |
| Dam Mouse (GB) 1812 | Louisa; 1800 | Ormond | Miss Cornforth |
| Dam Mouse (GB) 1812 | Louisa; 1800 | Evelina | Highflyer |
| Dam Mouse (GB) 1812 | Louisa; 1800 | Evelina | Termagant (Family 8-a) |
