= Ebor (horse) =

British-bred Thoroughbred racehorse

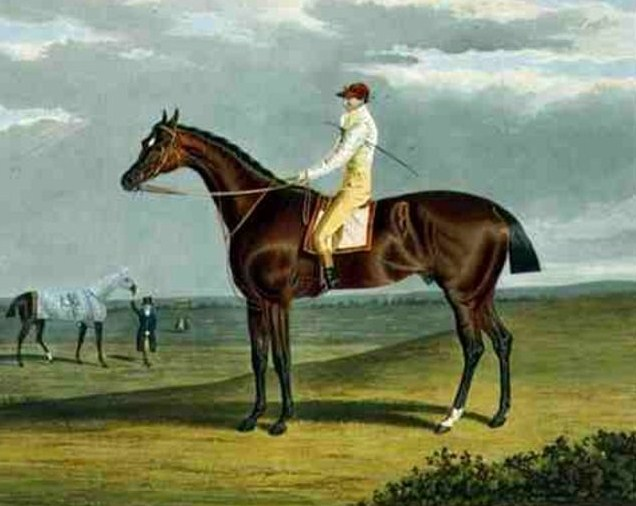
- 'Ebor', the Winner of the Great St. Leger at Doncaster, 1817 by John Frederick Herring Sr.
- Sire: Orville
- Grandsire: Beningbrough
- Dam: Constantia
- Damsire: Walnut
- Sex: Stallion
- Foaled: 1814
- Country: United Kingdom
- Colour: Bay
- Owner: Henry Peirse
- Trainer: John Lonsdale
- Record: 6: 4-1-1

Major wins
- Great St Leger Stakes (1817)

Ebor (1814–1822) was a British Thoroughbred racehorse and sire best known for winning the classic St Leger Stakes in 1817. Bred, trained and raced in Yorkshire, Ebor was lightly campaigned, running only six times in a three-year racing career which was confined to the meetings at York and Doncaster. He won four times, one of these being a walkover. His St Leger win (his only important success) saw him upset the favourite Blacklock in a dramatic and controversial finish. After his retirement he became a breeding stallion but died before he could make an impact at stud.

== Background ==
Ebor was a bay horse with a white star and one white foot bred at Bedale in Yorkshire by Henry Peirse in whose white and straw colours he competed during his racing career. Ebor was sired by the 1799 St Leger winner Orville, a successful staying racehorse who excelled over extreme distances. At stud he was Champion sire in 1817 and 1822 and sired the Classic winners Octavius (Derby Stakes), Emilius (Derby), Charlotte (1000 Guineas) and Zoe (1000 Guineas). Ebor's dam Constantia, regarded as the foundation mare of Thoroughbred family 19-b had previously produced Lisette, the dam of the 2000 Guineas winner Clearwell. Another of Lisette's foals, Madame Vestris, was the female ancestor of many important winners throughout the nineteenth and twentieth centuries.

== Racing career ==
=== 1817: three-year-old season ===
Ebor did not race as a two-year-old, beginning his racing career at York Racecourse on 22 May 1817. He started at odds of 3/1 and finished third of the six runner's behind Christopher Wilson's colt Parlington and Richard Gascoigne's unnamed brown colt.

Ebor did not race again until 22 September, when he was one of eighteen colts and fillies to contest the forty-second running of the St Leger Stakes at Doncaster Racecourse. The strong favourite for the race was Richard Watt's unnamed Whitelock colt (later named Blacklock) who started at odds of 4/5, despite having his first run of the season. Ebor, ridden by Robert Johnson, was a 20/1 outsider. The Whitelock colt, ridden with great confidence by John Jackson, took the lead in the straight and seemed poised to win very easily. In the closing stages, Jackson, who had boasted that he would win the race in a canter, began to ease the favourite down, apparently unaware that Bob Johnson was delivering a strong challenge on Ebor along the rail. By the time Jackson was alerted to the danger by the shouts of the crowd it was too late, and Ebor repelled the favourite's renewed challenge to win by a neck, with Restless in third place. Although there was a great deal of ill-feeling directed at Jackson, it was generally acknowledged that the favourite's defeat was a result of overconfidence rather than dishonesty.

A year later, the Sporting Magazine recalled the contest for the St Leger as an "admirable race" but reported that Blacklock was almost universally regarded as the better horse and stated that his defeat had been due to "the inattention of his rider".

=== 1818: four-year-old season ===
As a four-year-old, Ebor was unbeaten in three races, although he was not tested at the highest level. He did not appear until the York August meeting where he had two engagements, the first in a four-mile Produce Sweepstakes for four-year-old colts and fillies. The betting suggested that he was his owner's second string, as the favourite was Henry Peirse's grey filly by Orville out of Ebor's half-sister Lisette. The filly's chance ended when she fell at the start, and Ebor won the race from Donna Rodriguez, the only other runner. Three days later, Ebor started at odds of 1/3 for a two-mile Sweepstakes at the same course, and won from Lord Fitzwilliam's colt Anselmo. Ebor returned to Doncaster in September for his only other appearance of the season. His owner was able to claim the prize in a four-mile sweepstakes without having to race his colt, as the other four entries were withdrawn, allowing Ebor to walk over.

=== 1819: five-year-old season ===
Before being retired to stud, Ebor made one appearance as a five-year-old in 1819. He ran for the third consecutive year at Doncaster's St Leger meeting in September, contesting the weight-for-age Fitzwilliam Stakes over one and a half miles. He finished second of the eight runners behind Mr Fox's four-year-old Merlin, the 1/2 favourite.

== Stud career ==
Ebor began his breeding career at Peirse's Snape Hall stud near Bedale, where he stood at a fee of 10 guineas a mare, with a guinea for the groom. He had little chance to prove himself as a sire, dying from an "inflammation of the bowels" on 4 April 1822 at the age of eight.

== Pedigree ==
Pedigree of Ebor (GB), bay stallion, 1814
Sire Orville (GB) 1799	Beningbrough; 1791	King Fergus	Eclipse^
Sire Orville (GB) 1799	Beningbrough; 1791	King Fergus	Creeping Polly
Sire Orville (GB) 1799	Beningbrough; 1791	Fenwick's Herod mare	Herod*
Sire Orville (GB) 1799	Beningbrough; 1791	Fenwick's Herod mare	Pyrrha^
Sire Orville (GB) 1799	Evelina; 1791	Highflyer*	Herod*
Sire Orville (GB) 1799	Evelina; 1791	Highflyer*	Rachel*
Sire Orville (GB) 1799	Evelina; 1791	Termagant	Tantrum
Sire Orville (GB) 1799	Evelina; 1791	Termagant	Cantatrice
Dam Constantia (GB) 1796	Wallnut; 1786	Highflyer*	Herod*
Dam Constantia (GB) 1796	Wallnut; 1786	Highflyer*	Rachel*
Dam Constantia (GB) 1796	Wallnut; 1786	Maiden	Matchem*^
Dam Constantia (GB) 1796	Wallnut; 1786	Maiden	Pratt's old mare
Dam Constantia (GB) 1796	Contessina; 1787	Young Marske	Marske*^
Dam Constantia (GB) 1796	Contessina; 1787	Young Marske	Blank mare
Dam Constantia (GB) 1796	Contessina; 1787	Tuberose	Herod*
Dam Constantia (GB) 1796	Contessina; 1787	Tuberose	Grey Starling (Family:19-b)

* Ebor is inbred 3S x 3D to the stallion Highflyer, meaning that he appears third generation on the sire side of his pedigree and third generation on the dam side of his pedigree.

* Ebor is inbred 4S x 4S x 4D x 4D to the stallion Herod, meaning that he appears fourth generation twice on the sire side of his pedigree and fourth generation twice on the dam side of his pedigree.

*^ Ebor is inbred 5S x 4D to the stallion Marske, meaning that he appears fifth generation (via Eclipse)^ on the sire side of his pedigree and fourth generation on the dam side of his pedigree.

*^ Ebor is inbred 5S x 4D to the stallion Matchem, meaning that he appears fifth generation (via Pyrrha)^ on the sire side of his pedigree and fourth generation on the dam side of his pedigree.
