= General Grosvenor =

General Grosvenor may refer to:

- Charles H. Grosvenor (1833–1917), Union Army brevet brigadier general
- Thomas Grosvenor (British Army officer) (1764–1851), British Army general
- Gerald Grosvenor, 6th Duke of Westminster (1951–2016), British Territorial Army major general
