= 1810 in sports =

1810 in sports describes the year's events in world sport.

== Boxing ==
Events

- December — English champion Tom Cribb retains his title by defeating Afro-American Tom Molineaux, who was born into slavery, in the 39th round of their championship bout

== Cricket ==
Events

- The impact of the Napoleonic War has been felt by cricket since 1797, when inter-county matches simply ceased, and there has been a steady decline in both number and quality of major matches during the first decade of the 19th century until they became few and far between after 1810. Nevertheless, the impact of this war has been less severe than that of the Seven Years' War because of the existence this time of MCC and other well-organised clubs like Brighton and Montpelier. These clubs manage to co-ordinate cricket activities during the war emergency and, as it were, keep the game going.
- William Ward makes his debut in first-class cricket.

England

- Most runs – William Lambert 396 (HS 132*)
- Most wickets – William Lambert 31

== Horse racing ==
England

- 2,000 Guineas Stakes – Hephestion
- The Derby – Whalebone
- The Oaks – Oriana
- St Leger Stakes – Octavian
