= 1807 in sports =

1807 in sports describes the year's events in world sport.

== Boxing ==
Events

- John Gully wins the English championship following Hen Pearce's retirement due to ill health.

== Cricket ==
Events

- John Willes of Kent first tries to revive the idea of "straight-armed" (i.e., roundarm) bowling, which originated with Tom Walker in the 1790s.

England

- Most runs – William Lambert 355 (HS 110)
- Most wickets – John Wells 24

== Curling ==
- Establishment of the Royal Montreal Curling Club, the oldest sports club still active in North America

== Horse racing ==
England

- The Derby – Election
- The Oaks – Briseis
- St Leger Stakes – Paulina
