= Octavius (horse) =

British-bred Thoroughbred racehorse

- Sire: Orville
- Grandsire: Beningbrough
- Dam: Marianne
- Damsire: Mufti
- Sex: Stallion
- Foaled: 1809
- Country: United Kingdom of Great Britain and Ireland
- Colour: Brown
- Breeder: Robert Ladbroke
- Owner: Robert Ladbroke
- Trainer: Richard Boyce
- Record: 13:4-4-1

Major wins
- Epsom Derby (1812); Epsom Gold Cup (1813)

Octavius (1809–1831) was a British Thoroughbred racehorse and sire. In a racing career that lasted from April 1812 to May 1814 he ran thirteen times and won four races. He recorded his most important success when winning the Derby. Octavius remained in training for two more seasons, his best subsequent performance coming when he won the Epsom Gold Cup as a four-year-old in 1813. At the end of 1814 Octavius was retired to stud where he had moderate success as a sire of winners.

== Background ==
Octavius was sired by Orville a successful staying racehorse who excelled over extreme distances. At stud he was Champion sire in 1817 and 1822 and sired the Classic winners Emilius (Derby), Charlotte (1000 Guineas), Zoë (1000 Guineas) and Ebor (St Leger). Octavius's dam, Marianne, went on to produce Caroline, the winner of the 1820 Epsom Oaks.

Octavius was owned during his racing career by his breeder, the banker Robert Ladbroke, a friend of the Duke of York and Lord Egremont, whose horses were trained by Richard Boyce at Newmarket, Suffolk.

== Racing career ==
=== 1812: three-year-old season ===
Unraced as a two-year-old, Octavius made his first appearance at the 1812 Newmarket Craven meeting. On 30 March he started at odds of 5/1 in a 100 guinea Sweepstakes over the Abingdon Mile course and won from an unnamed gelding by Beningbrough. Just over two weeks later, Octavius contested the 2000 Guineas and started 4/1 second favourite. He finished third of the seven runners behind Cwrw and Cato.

On 14 May at Epsom Octavius was fourth choice in the betting for the Derby at odds of 7/1 in a field of fourteen runners. Ridden by Bill Arnull, Octavius moved up to dispute the lead on the turn into the straight with the favourite Comus and Lord Egremont's unnamed Gohanna colt. Comus dropped back inside the last quarter mile leaving Octavius and the Gohanna colt to contest the finish "in desperate style", with Octavius prevailing by half a neck. The filly Manuella, who started second favourite, was believed to have been "pulled" (deliberately prevented from winning) by her jockey Sam Chifney in order to lengthen her odds for The Oaks on the following day.

Octavius's next run came on 26 August at Egham Racecourse where he carried top weight of 122 pounds in the Magna Charta Stakes. He started the 2/5 favourite but finished last of the four runners behind the Duke of York's colt Pointers.

=== 1813: four-year-old season ===
Octavius's first run as a four-year-old came in a division of the Oatlands Stakes at Newmarket on 21 April. Carrying 114 pounds and starting 4/1 second favourite, he finished unplaced behind Mantidamun. At the next Newmarket meeting on 5 May, Octavius started favourite for the Port Stakes over two miles and finished second of the six runners behind Aquarius, with Pointers third.

On 3 June Octavius returned to the scene of his most important success to contest the Epsom Gold Cup. He was last of the four runners in the early stages, but moved up to join the leaders on the turn into the straight and recorded his first win in a year by winning the two mile race from Sorcery and Defiance after an "extremely spirited" race . At Ascot two weeks later Octavius ran twice without success. In the Swinley Stakes he ran a dead heat with the three-year-old Aladdin, but was beaten in a run-off after what the Sporting Magazine described as "a fine race". On the following day, he was beaten by the six-year-old Offa's Dyke, his only opponent in a one mile Sweepstakes. On 16 July, Octavius ran in his second dead-heat of the summer when he tied with the four-year-old Jesse in a one and a half mile race at Stockbridge Racecourse. On this occasion Ladbroke agreed to divide the prize with Jesse's owner without a deciding heat.

=== 1814: five-year-old season ===
As in the previous season, Octavius began 1814 with an unsuccessful run in a division of the Oatlands Stakes in April, finishing unplaced behind Pericles. At Newmarket's First Spring meeting on 28 April, he ran in a King's Plate, a three mile staying race in which he carried 154 pounds and finished second to Aquarius.

On 26 May Octavius returned to Epsom for the third time, but on this occasion he was unsuccessful, finishing unplaced behind Aquarius and Mantidamun in the Epsom Gold Cup. He was then put up for sale at Tattersalls where he was bought for 630 guineas by Lord Egremont and retired from racing.

== Stud career ==
Octavius began his breeding career in 1815 at Lord Egremont's stud at Petworth. His stud fee of five and a half guineas made him a cheaper alternative to the other Petworth stallions Gohanna (20 guineas) and Canopus (10 guineas). Octavius was not a great success as a stallion, but he did sire the Ascot Gold Cup winner Sir Huldibrand, the good stayer Black-and-all-black (who was black) and Little John, who in turn sired the 1839 Derby winner Frederick. He died at Petworth in 1831.

== Sire line tree ==
- Octavius
  - Little John
    - Frederick
    - Little John
      - Forester
      - Egremont
      - Merry Monarch
  - Black-and-all-black
  - Sir Huldibrand
  - Cricketer

== Pedigree ==
Pedigree of Octavius (GB), brown stallion, 1809
Sire Orville (GB) 1799	Beningbrough; 1791	King Fergus	Eclipse
Sire Orville (GB) 1799	Beningbrough; 1791	King Fergus	Creeping Polly
Sire Orville (GB) 1799	Beningbrough; 1791	Fenwick's Herod mare	Herod*
Sire Orville (GB) 1799	Beningbrough; 1791	Fenwick's Herod mare	Pyrrha
Sire Orville (GB) 1799	Evelina; 1791	Highflyer	Herod*
Sire Orville (GB) 1799	Evelina; 1791	Highflyer	Rachel
Sire Orville (GB) 1799	Evelina; 1791	Termagant	Tantrum
Sire Orville (GB) 1799	Evelina; 1791	Termagant	Cantatrice
Dam Marianne (GB) 1798	Mufti; 1783	Fitz Herod	Herod*
Dam Marianne (GB) 1798	Mufti; 1783	Fitz Herod	Miss Barforth
Dam Marianne (GB) 1798	Mufti; 1783	Infant mare	Infant
Dam Marianne (GB) 1798	Mufti; 1783	Infant mare	Whittington mare
Dam Marianne (GB) 1798	Maria; 1783	Telemachus	Herod*
Dam Marianne (GB) 1798	Maria; 1783	Telemachus	Skim mare
Dam Marianne (GB) 1798	Maria; 1783	A-La-Grecque	Regulus
Dam Marianne (GB) 1798	Maria; 1783	A-La-Grecque	Allworthy mare (Family:23-a)

* Octavius is inbred 4S x 4S x 4D x 4D to the stallion Herod, meaning that he appears fourth generation twice on the sire side of his pedigree and fourth generation twice on the dam side of his pedigree.
