= Samuel Chifney Jr. =

Sam Chifney Jr.
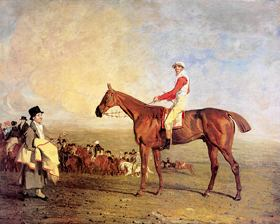
- Sam with Sam Chifney up by Benjamin Marshall (1763-1835)

Personal information
- Born: c. 1786
- Occupation: Jockey

Horse racing career
- Sport: Horse racing

Major racing wins
- British Classic Race wins as jockey: 1,000 Guineas (1843); 2,000 Guineas (1812); Epsom Oaks (1807, 1811, 1816, 1819, 1825); Epsom Derby (1818, 1820)

Significant horses
- Sam, Sailor

Samuel Chifney Jr. (born c. 1786) was an English jockey. He was the younger son of a prominent 18th century jockey, also called Samuel Chifney. In terms of talent, he reportedly outshone all his peers, but "he owned a self-destruct button and had a fatal tendency to press it". This failing meant "his talent was not converted into the kind of concrete achievement that stands the test of time".

He stood at 5 feet 6 inches tall and struggled with weight. He was too lazy to waste, which it is reported he thought "akin to Chinese water torture". He was once referred to as "the long, thin, lazy lad".

He had a strong friendship with fellow jockey Jem Robinson, and Robinson modelled his riding style on Chifney.

== Early life ==
Samuel Chifney was born in 1786. From the age of 6, he was out on Newmarket gallops twice a day, riding the Prince of Wales' Kit Karr under the tuition of his father. The father taught the son the slack rein style he himself used, known as 'the Chifney rush'.

At 13, Chifney was apprenticed to Frank Smallman, his maternal uncle. Smallman trained in Hertfordshire for the Earl of Oxford and once it became clear how successful the Smallman-Chifney pairing was, the Prince of Wales took on Smallman as his trainer. Chifney became the Prince's retained jockey at a fee of £8 per annum. He first rode for the Prince of Wales at the Stockbridge meeting in 1802.

== Career ==
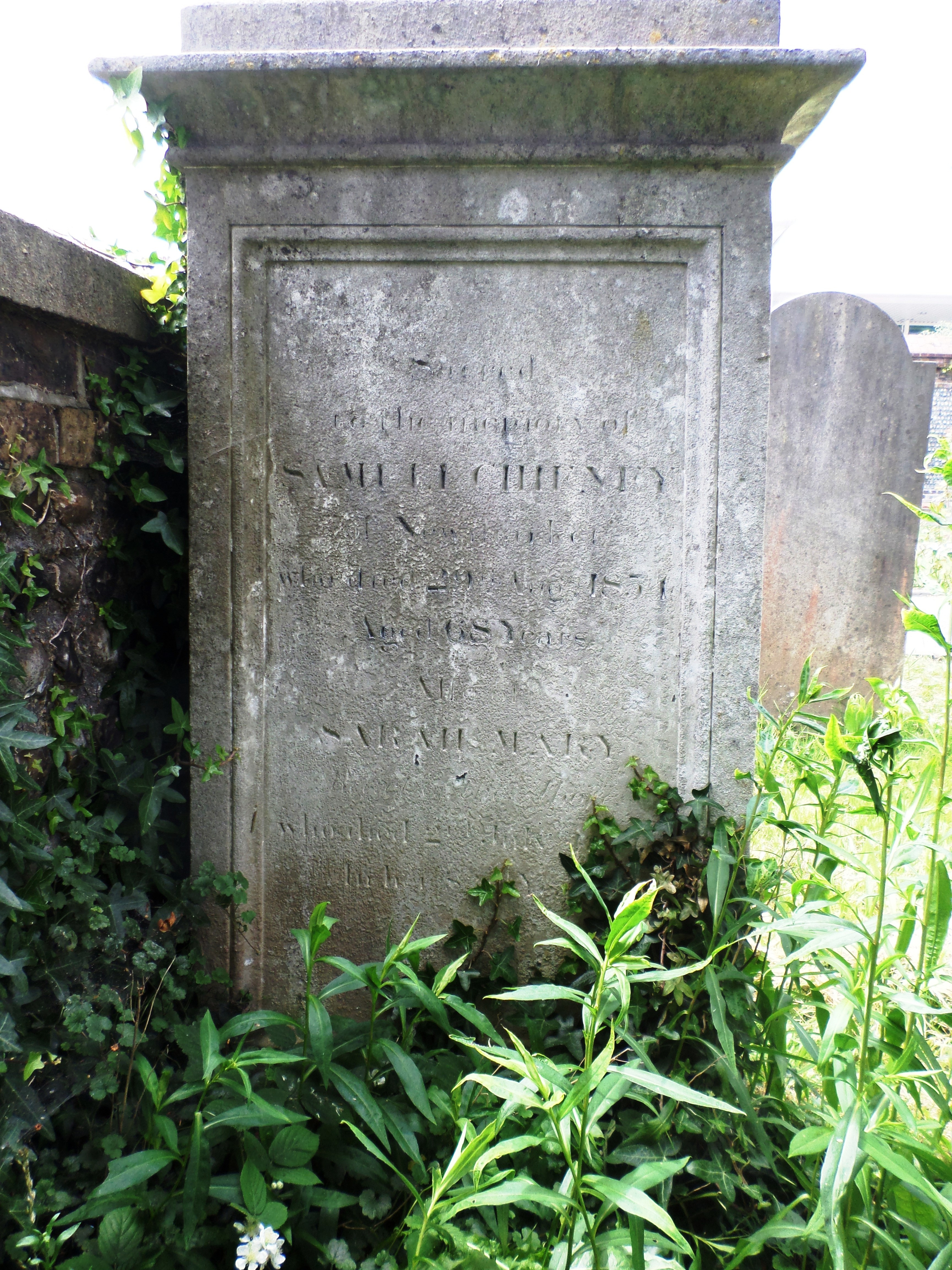
Gravestone of Samuel Chifney Jr. and his wife Sarah Mary Perren

Chifney arrived as a major jockey in Newmarket's Claret Stakes in the spring of 1805. On board Pavilion for Lord Darlington, he beat the previous year's Derby, Oaks and St. Leger winners partnered by Bill Arnull, Bill Clift and Frank Buckle

He was five times winner of the Oaks, on Briseis in 1807, on Sorcery in 1811, on Landscape in 1816, on Shoveller in 1819, and on Wings in 1823. Twice he took the Derby on Sam, a horse called after himself, in 1818, and on Sailor in 1820. The One Thousand Guineas also fell to him in 1843, when he rode Extempore, being at the time fifty-seven years old. He had training stables of his own at Newmarket, where with his brother William he had the care of Mr. Thornhill's and Lord Darlington's horses. The two brothers also had a small stud of their own, but this led them into difficulties, and the horses had to be sold in June 1834.

Chifney died in Hove, Sussex on 29 August 1854 and was buried in the churchyard of St Andrew's. His epitaph on the headstone simply reads of Newmarket. His wife, Sarah Mary Perren, (daughter of Newmarket trainer Thomas Perren) is also commemorated on the stone.

== Classic race victories ==
(United Kingdom) Great Britain

- 1,000 Guineas – Extempore (1843)
- 2,000 Guineas – Cwrw (1812)
- Epsom Oaks – (5) – Briseis (1807), Sorcery (1811), Landscape (1816), Shoveler (1819), Wings (1825)
- Epsom Derby – (2) – Sam (1818), Sailor (1820)

== Bibliography ==
- Boase, George Clement (1904). "Chifney, Samuel" . Dictionary of National Biography. London: Smith, Elder & Co.
- Mortimer, Roger; Onslow, Richard; Willett, Peter (1978). Biographical Encyclopaedia of British Racing. London: Macdonald and Jane's. ISBN 0-354-08536-0.
- Tanner, Michael; Cranham, Gerry (1992). Great Jockeys of the Flat. Enfield, Middlesex: Guinness Publishing. ISBN 0-85112-989-7.
- Wright, Howard (1986). The Encyclopaedia of Flat Racing. London: Robert Hale. ISBN 0-7090-2639-0.
