= 1857 Grand National =

English steeplechase horse race

- Grand National
- Location: Aintree
- Date: 4 March 1857
- Winning horse: Emigrant
- Starting price: 10/1
- Jockey: Charlie Boyce
- Trainer: Charlie Boyce
- Owner: George Hodgman
- Conditions: Soft (good to soft in places)

The 1857 Grand National was the 19th renewal of the Grand National horse race that took place at Aintree near Liverpool, England, on 4 March 1857.

== The Course ==
The course was unchanged from the previous year. However, there were complaints this year from most of the jockeys at the harrowing of the ground along the Canal side of the course, making it very heavy going. A detailed description of the course hadn't been given in the press since 1849. The names given below are those used by the trade press in their most recent description of each fence. The only change from last year being that the fourteenth fence was this year described by the reporter of Bell's Life as the Artificial bush fence at the distance.

First circuit: Start At the field adjacent to the wheat field beyond the lane, Fence 1 {16} Ditch, Fence 2 {17} Bank, Fence 3 {18} Post and Rails, Fence 4 {19} Old dead hedge with partial ditch on approach, Fence 5 {20} Becher's Brook, Fence 6 {21} Bank, Fence 7 {22} Bank, post and ditch, Fence 8 {23} Extreme Turning flag, Fence 9 {24} Valentine's Brook, Fence 10 {25} Quickset hedge and ditch, Fence 11 {26} Post and rails, Fence 12 {27} Ditch, Fence 13 {28} Hedge at Canal Bridge.

The runners then turned at the first opportunity on re-entering the racecourse and made towards the fences in front of the stands. Fence 14 Artificial bush, Fence 15 Artificial water jump, 13' 6" wide with a 3' high rail and 4' brook.

Second circuit: The runners then turned away from the Grandstands again and crossed Proceed's lane, into the a field known as the wheat piece before following the same circuit until reaching the racecourse again. This time the runners continued to the wider extreme of the course before turning to run up the straight in front of the stands. Fence 29 Long length hurdles, Fence 30 Distance hurdle.

The runners then bypassed the Artificial bush and water jumps inside before reaching the winning post in front of the Main Stand.

== Build up and Leading contenders ==
Calls were yet again made by the press to reframe the handicap to ensure the top weight carried 12 stone 7lbs after this year's top weight, Escape was given just 11 stone 2 lbs by the handicapper. However, little blame for this was placed at the handicappers door, instead citing that there remained a lack of good hunters in racing, which was now attracting broken down flat race rejects. The result was a field yet again considered by the press to be of a very poor quality with at least three competitors facing a steeplechase for the first time.

As part of the preparations for the race this year, an eve of the National Grand fancy dress ball was held at St Georges Hall in which upwards of 2,000 people attended.

Minos was installed as 100/15 favourite on the day of the race on the back of many press commentators feeling that his third-place finish last year was due to his rider leaving it too late to issue his challenge. The feeling that a more experienced rider would have won would now be tested as Alec Goodman, winner of the 1852 race was given the ride.

Escape had been considered unfortunate two years earlier when a pole, dislodged by another runner caused him to fall at the fence after second Becher's when going well. A long time anti post favourite, he was sent off at 7/1 and provided a fourth ride in the race for John Thrift.

Hopeless Star at 9/1 was taking part for the third time, having found that a change of name from Star of England in 1854 had proved transformative to finish fourth last year. Tom Olliver, the most successful and experienced rider in Grand National history wasted furiously to try and make the weight for the ride but, for the second consecutive year was unable to do so, highlighting the growing issue for professional riders of being unable to secure rides due to the low weights being issued in handicaps The Irishman, Denny Wynne, winner of the 1847 race, and who, in the absence of Olliver, was the most experienced rider in this year's contest, retained the ride from last year, his eleventh in the race.

Emigrant was 10/1 and continued the public faith in horses with proven National experience, having run to a bad sixth under Charlie Boyce last year. This time his owner, George Hodgman made no secret of his firm belief that the horse was a certainty this year, placing substantial bets on it to win. Public confidence faded in the days leading up to the race when Hodgman began laying his horse to hedge his bets, leading to one individual to confront him, resulting in a short live fist fight, which Hodgman settled in two punches. Unknown to most was that jockey, Boyce had injured himself in a hunting accident the week before the race and upon informing Hodgman was told to go to Liverpool and take the ride regardless, his owner believing he could find no better rider. The disappointed Hodgman began laying heavily in the belief the horse now couldn't win and when asked for riding instructions by Boyce in the paddock, the owner told him to do as he liked.

Teddeseley at 12/1 was the best backed of the runners making their first attempt at the National and provided a second ride in the race for his jockey, R. Archer.

Although largely unconsidered this year, Maurice Daley became only the third horse to line up for a sixth attempt at the Grand National, emulating the former winner, Peter Simple and in turn his namesake, the grey Peter Simple.

== The Race ==
With one owner submitting four of the twenty-eight entries, all in identical colours, and poor visibility out on the course, those trying to form a race report for the press in the stands found it hard to give an accurate description, relying mostly from jockey's testimony as they returned after the race.

The field set off at the third or fourth attempt, quickly forming into two groups over the first few fences, while last year's winner, Freetrader became the first of many former winners to suffer the fate of exiting in their defence at the first obstacle.

By the third fence, Weathercock had taken up the running, only to be baulked by Lady Arthur and Omar Pasha as the three went to jump, all being brought to a standstill, which left Garry Owen in front going down to Becher's Brook for the first time. Minos was another who had difficulty at the post and rails hitting it hard and effectively ending her chances as she ran on with increasing lameness.

At the Brook Garry Owen led Emigrant, Little Charley, Dangerous and Albatross with the Irish outsider opening up a solid lead by the time the field took the extreme turn and made their way up the Canal side.

While the runners all hugged the inside flags at each fence trying to stay off the worst of the heavy plough, Boyce, having been told to ride as he liked, took Emigrant as far off the course as he could, running right along the Canal tow path itself, which was rock solid under foot, veering back on course at each fence so as not to run outside the flags.

When Boyce brought his mount back onto the same racing line as his rivals to jump the lane at the Canal, he was many lengths clear of Garry Owen, who in turn headed a field of horses all struggling to various degrees down the course. The return to racing turf on the racecourse proper enabled the flat racers to make up their ground and the field had bunched up again by the time they were passing the stands.

Approaching the bush fence by the distance chair Albatross dropped out of the back of the pack, staggering horribly as his rider, Meaney quickly dismounted. on inspection it was found the Irish horse had broken a blood vessel and would be dead within minutes.

Boyce continued to lead Emigrant over the fence at the chair, where Star Of The West collided with Forest Queen and fell. At the water jump the order was Emigrant, pursued by Westminster, Little Charley, Hopeless Star, Garry Owen, Jean Du Quesne, the struggling Minos, who dropped her legs into the water and almost fell, Dangerous, Teddesley, Weathercock, Escape, Lady Arthur, Romeo, Omar Pasha, Casse Cou, Treachery, Horniblow, King Dan and Squire Of Bensham with the remainder now struggling to stay in touch, including the tailed off Midge who was pulled up at Proceed's Lane.

Garry Owen suffered a fatal broken back in a heavy fall at the bank, fence seventeen, while Boyce now used the energy saved on the first circuit to stretch his rivals on the second. Down to Becher's and the extreme turn, he increased his lead at every fence until fifty yards ahead of second placed Westminster when taking Valentine's, by which time Minos, Escape, Hopeless Star Jean Du Quense and Little Charley were all now tailed off.

While Boyce yet again opted for the tow path, Palmer, aboard Westminster stuck with the inside, followed by Teddesley, Dangerous, Treachery and Weathercock, the remainder now beaten. Teddesley fell at the post and rails, fence twenty-six, and initially caused concern that he would be the third fatality of the race before recovering.

Boyce re-entered the race course almost 100 yards clear of his rivals, taking a pull to give Emigrant a breather before lining up for the hurdles. With Westminster fading, Weathercock and Dangerous were now the only two who could form a challenge. Weathercock came upsides Emigrant but Boyce had a much fresher horse under him and eased clear again after the final flight to win easily by three lengths. Dangerous was pulled up after jumping the final hurdle, being caught at the post by Treachery and Westminster with a long gap back to any other finishers.

== Finishing Order ==
Position	Name	Jockey	Handicap (st-lb)	SP	Distance	Colours
Winner	Emigrant	Charles Boyce	9-10	10-1	10 mins, 6 seconds	Yellow, green sleeves and cap
Second	Weathercock	Chris Green	8-12	25-1	3 Lengths	Blue, yellow sleeves, black cap
Third	Treachery	Poole	9-0	100-1	10 Lengths	Light blue, orange cap
Fourth	Westminster	George Palmer	9-2 [inc 6lbs extra]	100-1	1/2 a length	Light blue, orange cap
Fifth	Dangerous	F. Page	9-8	50-1	1/2 a length, pulled up	
Sixth	Jean De Quesne {Formerly Agustine}	Harry Lamplugh	10-0	100-7	A distance	White, red piping, black cap
Seventh	Lady Arthur	Edwin Weaver	9-4	100-1		Dark blue, black cap
Eighth	Forest Queen	Tom Donaldson	9-8	20-1		Tartan, yellow sleeves, black cap
Ninth	Casse Cou {Formerly Needwood}	Johnson	10-2	100-1		Red and green stripes, black cap
Tenth	Minos	Alec Goodman	10-4	100-15 Fav	Finished lame	Blue and white hoops, blue cap
Eleventh and last	Squire of Bensham	J. Coxon	9-8	100-1		
Non Finishers
Fence 29 {Penultimate hurdle}	Escape	John Thrift	11-2	7-1	Pulled up, home turn	Yellow, black cap
Fence 29	First of May	Robert Sly Jr	9-0	100-1	Pulled up, home turn	
Fence 29	Hopeless Star {Formerly Star Of England}	Denny Wynne	10-0	9-1	Pulled up, home turn	Brown, white cap
Fence 29	Horniblow	H.P.Lance {rode as Mr Dart}	9-10	50/1	Pulled up, home turn	Green, orange sleeves, black cap
Fence 29	King Dan	J. Escott	9-6	100-1	Pulled up, home turn	
Fence 29	Little Charley	T.J.Burrows	10-0	100-7	Pulled up, home turn	Purple, orange sleeves, black cap
Fence 29	Maurice Daley	Robert James	9-2	40-1	Pulled up, home turn	Orange, blue sash, black cap
Fence 29	Omar Pasha	Joe Kendall	9-2	100-6	Pulled up, home turn	Yellow, black cap
Fence 29	Romeo	Walter White	9-6	100-6	Pulled up, home turn	Light blue, orange cap
Fence 26 {Post and rails}	Teddesley	R. Archer	9-0	12-1	Fell	Red and white stripes, red cap
Fence 19	Sting	John Hanlon	9-6	50-1	Pulled up, home turn	White, violet sleeves and cap
Fence 17 {Bank}	Garry Owen	John Ryan	9-12	30-1	Fell Fatally	Yellow, blue diamonds, yellow cap
Fence 16 {Ditch}	Midge	W. Black	9-6	100-1	Pulled up, Proceeds Lane	
Fence 14 {Artificial bush}	Albatross	Dan Meaney	9-6	100-1	Pulled up, fatal burst blood vessel	Blue and white stripes, black cap
Fence 14	Star of the West	A. or E. Jones	10-0	100-1	Brought Down	
Fence 10 {Quickset hedge}	Red Rose	David Hughes	9-8	100-1	Tailed off and fell later	
Fence 1 {Ditch}	Freetrader	George Stevens	10-0	25-1	Fell	Black, white sleeves and cap

Non Runners - Lough Bawn, Trembleur, Waterfall, Harry Lorrequer

== Aftermath ==
Any criticism of Charlie Boyce for adopting the tactic of riding on the Canal towpath seems to have been retrospective as the press made no mention of any objection from any of the riders or connections of any of the other competitors at the time. However, Aintree did take care to flag the outside of every fence from this year forward to prevent any repeat.

George Hodgman admitted that he struggled to enjoy his success as co owner at the time. Despite winning £5,000, he'd stood to win five times that before Boyce's injury caused him to start laying his bets. However, he still rewarded his jockey with a gift of £1,000 and later said of Boyce "...as a man or a rider, I know not how to write too eulogistically. To my mind, over a country he was so far the best of his contemporaries that I should not care to select a second. He was a splendid specimen of physical development and singularly handsome; his manners were charming."

Boyce himself was so exhausted and in pain from his efforts, he had to be helped back to the weighing room after the race. Johnny Ryan was shaken by his fall from Garry Owen but returned, along with all the riders, to the weighing room unhurt. His mount was euthanised while attempts to save Albatross continued for a quarter of an hour before the horse died from a broken blood vessel. The favourite, Minos was found to have gone lame from a cut on her foreleg believed to have come from crashing into the third fence, the post and rails, on the first circuit. Despite this, Goodman, perhaps feeling the weight of the favourite's tag, persevered with the horse and completed the course. Initial fears that Teddesley had broken his back were unfounded. The horse getting back up having lain on the turf for around a quarter of an hour after the race.

The Owners of Albatross, Maurice Daley and Horniblow were fined for not declaring their colours.
