= Beningbrough (horse) =

British Thoroughbred racehorse

- Sire: King Fergus
- Grandsire: Eclipse
- Dam: Fenwick's Herod mare
- Damsire: Herod
- Sex: Stallion
- Foaled: 1791
- Country: Kingdom of Great Britain
- Colour: Bay
- Breeder: John Hutchinson
- Owner: John Hutchinson; Sir Charles Turner
- Record: 12: 8-3-1

Major wins
- St Leger Stakes (1794); Doncaster Cup (1794); Match against Bennington (1795); Doncaster Stakes (1795); Match against Ormond (1796)

Beningbrough (1791–1815) was a British Thoroughbred racehorse and sire best known for winning the classic St Leger Stakes in 1794. In a racing career which lasted from May 1794 until August 1797 he won eight of his twelve races. After being beaten on his first appearance, he won his remaining four races as a three-year-old, including the St Leger and the Gold Cup at Doncaster Racecourse in September. He was lightly campaigned thereafter but three times in 1795 and once in 1796. He was then retired to stud where he became a highly successful breeding stallion being the sire and grandsire of many important winners.

== Background ==
Beningbrough was a bay horse "of great size" bred, owned and trained by John Hutchinson of Shipton, North Yorkshire, and named after a nearby village.

He was sired by King Fergus, a successful racehorse who was based at Hutchinson's stud for much of his breeding career. Apart from Beningbrough he was best known as the sire of Hambletonian, who won the St Leger and became an influential breeding stallion whose direct descendants included Voltigeur, St Simon, Count Fleet and many other major winners. Beningbrough was the seventh of twelve foals produced by Mr Fenwick's mare by Herod.

== Racing career ==
=== 1794: three-year-old season ===
On 29 May 1794 Benningbrough, brother to Sandhopper made his first appearance in a sweepstakes over one and a half miles at York Racecourse. He started 6/4 favourite but was beaten into second place by Prior, a grey colt owned by Gilbert Crompton. Beningbrough returned to York for two races in August, both of which he won. He recorded his first victory when beating two opponents in a two-mile sweepstakes and then defeated Mr Wilson's filly Eliza and four others over on and a half miles two days later.

On 17 September, Beningbrough was one of eight colts and fillies to contest the nineteenth running of the St Leger Stakes over two miles at Doncaster Racecourse. Ridden by John Jackson, he was the second favourite at odds of 2/1 and won the classic from Prior and Mr Garforth's grey colt (later named Brilliant). On the following afternoon, Beningbrough was matched against older horses, including the previous year's St Leger winner Ninety-three in the four-mile Gold Cup. He started the 1/2 favourite and won from Mr Webb's mare Constant.

=== 1795: four-year-old season ===
In August 1795, Beningbrough, together with his stable companion Hambletonian, was sold for 3,000 guineas to Sir Charles Turner of Kirkleatham. Beningbrough did not appear as a four-year-old until 28 August when he started favourite for a division of the Great Subscription Purse, but finished last of the three runners behind Brilliant and Bennington. According to an account in the Sportsman's Pilot Beningbrough and Bennington "defeated themselves" by battling for the lead throughout the race enabling the more conservatively ridden Brilliant to overtake them both in the closing stages. In the following month, Beningbrough returned to the scene of his classic victory for three races at the Doncaster St Leger meeting. On 22 September he defeated Bennington in a 500 guinea match race over four miles and on the following afternoon he won the Doncaster Stakes, beating Brilliant and Eliza. A day later he contested a £100 race run in a series of two-mile heats, with the prize going to the first horse to win twice. Beningbrough settled the race in two heats, beating Brilliant into second place on each occasion.

=== 1796: five-year-old season ===
Beningbrough's five-year-old season consisted of two races at York in August. On Saturday 20 August he won a match race against Mr Wentworth's Ormond over four miles to win a prize of 500 guineas. Four days later he was made the 1/2 favourite against two opponents for a division of the Great Subscription Purse, but was beaten by the mare Eliza.

=== 1797: six-year-old season ===
In early 1797, John Hutchinson bought Beningbrough back from Sir Charles Turner. The horse's final season was again restricted to the August meeting at York. Hutchinson received a fifty guinea forfeit when Mr Tatton's horse Yorkshire Bite failed to appear for a match against Beningbrough on 19 August. Five days later, Beningbrough ended his career in a division of the Great Subscription Purse in which he finished second to Hambletonian.

== Stud career ==
Beningbrough was retired from racing to become a breeding stallion at Shipton, standing at a fee of six guineas and a crown. By 1803, following the success of his early progeny on the racecourse, his fee had risen to ten and a half guineas. In 1808 he moved to Mr Dimsdale's establishment at Middleham, where he stood at a fee of twenty-five guineas with the owners of his prospective mates being required to submit written applications. Beningbrough remained at Middleham until his death on 7 February 1815. He was buried under a mulberry tree in front of Dimsdale's house.

Beningbrough's best winners included the classic winners Oriana, Ashton, Briseis and Orville (also a champion sire). Another of his sons was Scud who won the Doncaster Cup and sired the Derby winners Sam and Sailor. Beningbrough was also a successful sire of broodmares being the maternal grandsire of Doctor Syntax, Variation, Reveller and The Duchess.

== Sire line tree ==
- Beningbrough
  - Ashton
  - Blue Devil
  - Harefoot
  - Delville
  - Rygantino
  - Thorn
  - Bedalian
  - Hylas
  - Phlebotomist
  - Scud
    - Sam
    - Steeltrap
      - Chancellor
    - Sailor
    - Actaeon
      - General Chasse
        - Napier
        - Journal
        - Zestokij
      - St Martin
        - Dolo
      - Albion
        - The Colonel
        - Bill Cheatam
        - Bill Dearing
        - Hiawatha
        - Socks
        - Blackbird
      - John Bull
      - Gallant
  - Windle
  - Trophonius
  - Prince of Orange
  - Orville
    - Octavius
      - Little John
        - Frederick
        - Little John
      - Black-and-all-black
      - Sir Huldebrand
      - Cricketer
    - Muley
      - Robin Hood
        - Black Comet
      - Morisco
        - Morris Dancer
        - Taurus
        - Zany
        - Cadet
      - Outlaw
        - Tamworth
      - Leviathan
        - Othello
        - Hugh L French
        - The Poney
        - Wacousta
        - Pete Whetstone
        - Boyd McNairy
        - John R Grymes
        - Outrage
        - Stanley
        - Tom Marshall
        - John Ross
        - Envoy
        - Black Satin
        - Ebony
        - Stafford
        - Capt Elgee
        - Jack Hays
      - Rector
      - Marvel
      - Margrave
        - Mulberry Wine
        - Perry
        - Lutzow
        - Blue Dick
        - Landscape
        - Gosport
        - Prince Albert
        - Tom Payne
        - Doubloon
        - Brown Dick
        - Henry Perritt
      - Muley Moloch
        - Galaor
        - Middleham
        - Moloch
        - Pagan
        - Cattonite
        - Edmond
        - Teetotaller
        - Phenomenon
        - Punjaub
      - Dick
        - Arthur
      - Muleyson
      - Gil Blas
      - King Of Clubs
      - Gilbert Gurney
      - Dulcimer
      - The Little Known
        - Little Hastings
      - Drayton
        - Bourton
        - Emigrant
      - Gibraltar
      - Hautboy
      - Little Wonder
      - Snoozer
    - Belville
    - Dinmont
    - Fulford
    - Don Juan
    - Ebor
    - Fitz Orville
      - Windfall
    - Allegro
    - Master Henry
    - Andrew
      - Cadland
        - Arrow
        - The Prime Warden
        - Nautilus
        - Romulus
    - Richard
    - Bizarre
      - Mus
        - Vampyre
    - Emilius
      - Agreeable
      - Priam
        - Chesterfield
        - Monarch
        - Prizeflower
        - Rubens
        - Scamander
        - Troilus
        - Bretby
        - Dey Of Algiers
        - Tros
        - Young Priam
        - Giges
        - Regent
        - Bay Priam
        - Daniel Webster
        - Alexander
        - Lamar
        - Lambda
      - Recovery
        - Retriever
        - Reprieve
      - St Nicholas
        - St Lawrence
        - St John
        - Yorkshire
        - Gasperoni
        - Longsight
        - Incognito
        - Lionel
        - Uriel
      - Tantivy
      - Chapman
      - Ciudad Rodrigo
      - Exile
      - Marcus
      - Riddlesworth
      - Sarpedon
        - Louis d'Or
      - Young Emilius
        - Renonce
        - Fitz Emilius
        - Amalfi
      - Hawker
      - Lucius
      - Mosquito
      - Plentipotentiary
        - Alexander
        - Ambassador
        - Envoy
        - Herold
        - Nuncio
        - The Era
      - Coriolanus
      - Operator
        - Emilius
        - Figaro
      - Young Emilius
      - Mango
        - Portumnus
      - Riddlesworth
        - Clymeneus
        - Dainty Ariel
        - Scud
      - The Steamer
      - Euclid
        - Bantam
      - Mercer
        - Traveller
      - Sovereign
        - Childe Harold
        - Mahomet
        - Charleston
        - Ruric
        - Sequin
        - Marengo
        - Mogul
        - Colossus
        - John Morgan
        - Prolific
      - Record
      - Theon
      - Pompey
        - Millionaire
      - The Caster
        - Wollaton
      - Elemi
      - Tragical
      - Mathematician
        - Monge
      - Gambetti
    - Ganymede
    - Vargas
    - Pollio

== Pedigree ==
Pedigree of Beningbrough (GB), bay stallion, 1791
| Sire King Fergus (GB) 1775 | Eclipse; 1764 | Marske | Squirt |
| Sire King Fergus (GB) 1775 | Eclipse; 1764 | Marske | The Ruby Mare |
| Sire King Fergus (GB) 1775 | Eclipse; 1764 | Spilletta | Regulus |
| Sire King Fergus (GB) 1775 | Eclipse; 1764 | Spilletta | Mother Western |
| Sire King Fergus (GB) 1775 | Creeping Polly; 1756 | Othello | Crab |
| Sire King Fergus (GB) 1775 | Creeping Polly; 1756 | Othello | Miss Slamerkin* |
| Sire King Fergus (GB) 1775 | Creeping Polly; 1756 | Fanny | Tartar*^ |
| Sire King Fergus (GB) 1775 | Creeping Polly; 1756 | Fanny | Starling mare |
| Dam Fenwick's Herod mare (GB) 1780 | Herod; 1758 | Tartar* | Partner*^ |
| Dam Fenwick's Herod mare (GB) 1780 | Herod; 1758 | Tartar* | Meliora |
| Dam Fenwick's Herod mare (GB) 1780 | Herod; 1758 | Cypron | Blaze |
| Dam Fenwick's Herod mare (GB) 1780 | Herod; 1758 | Cypron | Salome |
| Dam Fenwick's Herod mare (GB) 1780 | Pyrrha; 1771 | Matchem | Cade |
| Dam Fenwick's Herod mare (GB) 1780 | Pyrrha; 1771 | Matchem | sister 2 to Miss Partner^ |
| Dam Fenwick's Herod mare (GB) 1780 | Pyrrha; 1771 | Duchess | Whitenose |
| Dam Fenwick's Herod mare (GB) 1780 | Pyrrha; 1771 | Duchess | Miss Slamerkin* (Family:7) |

* Beningbrough is inbred 4S x 3D to the stallion Tartar, meaning that he appears fourth generation on the sire side of his pedigree and third generation on the dam side of his pedigree.

* Beningbrough is inbred 4S x 4D to the mare Miss Slamerkin, meaning that she appears fourth generation on the sire side of his pedigree and fourth generation on the dam side of his pedigree.

*^ Beningbrough is inbred 5S x 4D x 5D to the stallion Partner, meaning that he appears fifth generation (via Tartar)^ on the sire side of his pedigree and fourth generation and fifth generation (via sister 2 Miss Partner)^ on the dam side of his pedigree.
