= Thomas Grosvenor (British Army officer) =

British Army officer and politician (1764–1851)

Field Marshal Thomas Grosvenor
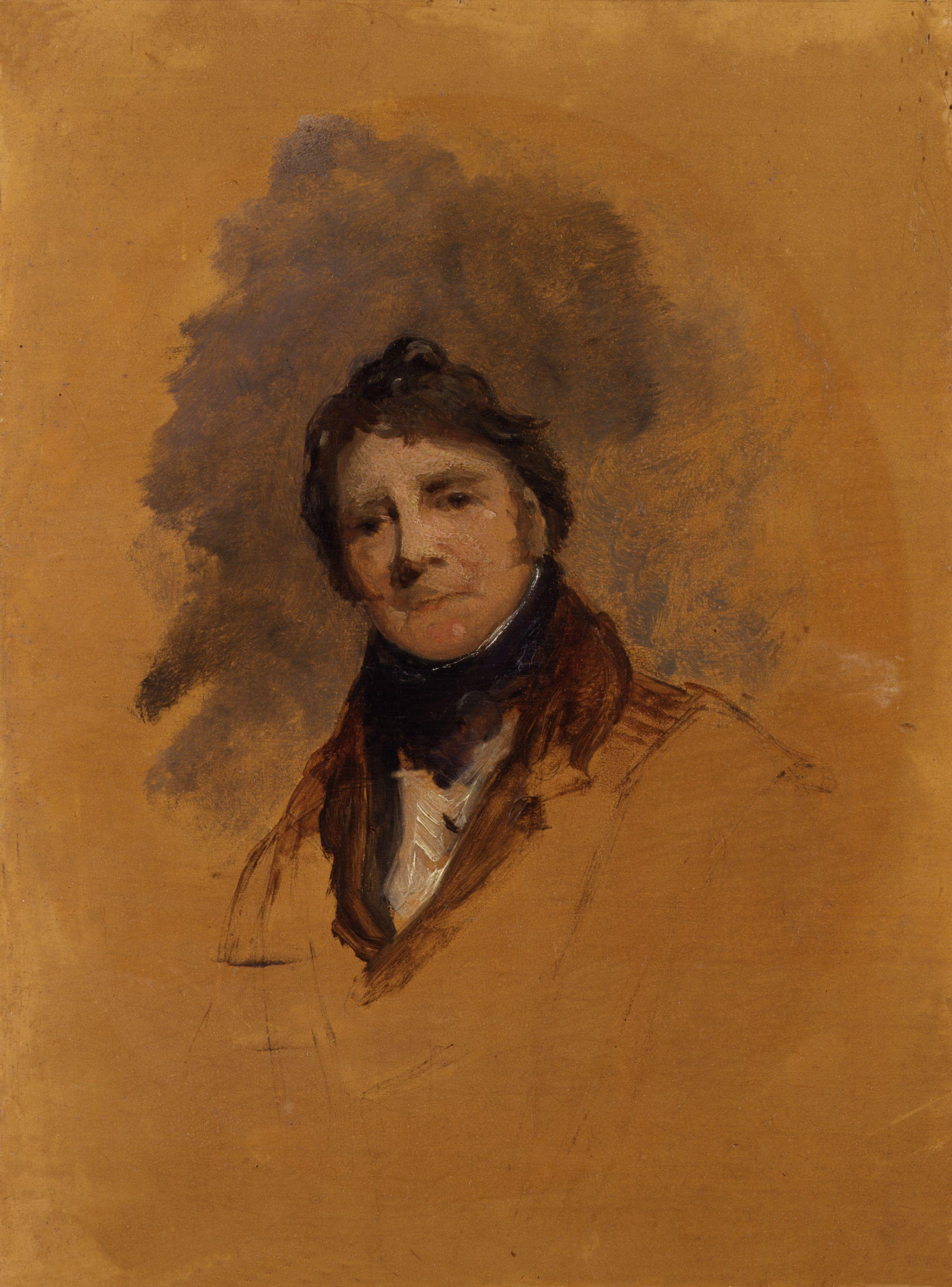
- Portrait attributed to Robert Bowyer, c. 1820
- Born: 30 May 1764
- Died: 20 January 1851 (aged 86); Richmond Hill, London
- Military career
- Allegiance: Great Britain; United Kingdom
- Branch: British Army
- Service years: 1779–1851
- Rank: Field marshal
- Unit: 3rd Foot Guards
- Commands: 97th Regiment of Foot; 65th Regiment of Foot
- Conflicts: American War of Independence; French Revolutionary Wars; Flanders campaign; Battle of Raismes; Anglo-Russian Invasion of Holland; Battle of Callantsoog; Battle of Alkmaar; Napoleonic Wars; Battle of Copenhagen (1807); Walcheren Expedition

Field Marshal Thomas Grosvenor (30 May 1764 – 20 January 1851) was a British Army officer and politician. After serving as a junior officer defending the Bank of England during the Gordon Riots he took part in the Flanders Campaign including the retreat into Germany during the French Revolutionary Wars. He served as a brigade commander at the Battle of Copenhagen and was then deployed to Walcheren in the Netherlands where he served as deputy commander of a division led by Sir Eyre Coote during the disastrous Walcheren Campaign.

== Military career ==
The Anglo-Russian invasion of Holland, which Grosvenor participated in

=== Early career ===
Born the third son of Thomas Grosvenor (1734–1795) and Deborah (née Skynner) Grosvenor, he was educated at Westminster School and commissioned into the 1st Foot Guards on 1 October 1779.

He was in charge of security at the Bank of England during the Gordon Riots in 1780. Promoted to captain on 20 April 1784 and lieutenant-colonel on 25 April 1793, he took part in the Flanders Campaign including the retreat into Germany in Spring 1795 during the French Revolutionary Wars.

Grosvenor succeeded his father as Whig Member of Parliament for Chester in 1795.

He took part in the Anglo-Russian invasion of Holland in August 1799 and was promoted to brigadier-general while serving under Sir Ralph Abercromby in Holland on 18 November 1800. In parliament he opposed the bill against bull-baiting introduced in 1802.

Promoted to major-general on 29 April 1802, Grosvenor held various brigade commands in Southern England between 1803 and 1805. He had a keen interest in horse racing and his horse, Briseis, won The Oaks in June 1807.

=== The Walcheren campaign ===
Grosvenor served as a brigade commander at the Battle of Copenhagen in August 1807 for which he was rewarded with promotion to lieutenant-general on 25 April 1808. However, in Autumn 1809 he was deployed to Walcheren in the Netherlands where he served as deputy commander of a division led by Eyre Coote during the disastrous Walcheren Campaign which ended in failure when many of the British troops died of malaria.

In January 1810, he spoke in Parliament in support of Lord Porchester's demands for an inquiry into the disastrous expedition that had taken place the previous year and with which Grosvenor had been so closely associated.

=== Later career ===
Grosvenor was promoted to full general on 12 August 1819. In 1820 he had a fortunate escape during the Cato Street Conspiracy when an angry mob overturned his carriage into the River Dee. Around the same time he started renting the Warren House in Loughton, probably as it was on the way to Newmarket Racecourse. He stood down as Member of Parliament for Chester in 1826 to make way for his cousin's son, Robert Grosvenor, and instead became Member of Parliament for Stockbridge. In June 1825 another of Thomas Grosvenor's horses, Wings, won the Epsom Oakes. He retired from parliament in 1830.

Grosvenor also served as honorary colonel of the 97th Regiment of Foot in 1807 and then as honorary colonel of the 65th Regiment of Foot from 1814 to his death. He was promoted to field marshal on 9 November 1846 and died at his home, Mount Ararat at Richmond Hill on 20 June 1851.

== Family ==
In 1797 Grosvenor married Elizabeth Heathcote (daughter of Sir Gilbert Heathcote, 3rd Baronet); after the death of his first wife he married Anne Wilbraham (daughter of George Wilbraham MP) in 1831. There were no children from either marriage.

== Sources ==
- Heathcote, Tony (1999). The British Field Marshals, 1736–1997: A Biographical Dictionary. Barnsley: Leo Cooper. ISBN 0-85052-696-5.

Parliament of Great Britain
Preceded by Thomas Grosvenor; Viscount Belgrave	Member of Parliament for Chester; 1795–1800; With: Viscount Belgrave	Succeeded by Parliament of the United Kingdom
Parliament of the United Kingdom
Preceded by Parliament of the Great Britain	Member of Parliament for Chester; 1801–1826; With: Viscount Belgrave 1801–1802; Richard Erle-Drax-Grosvenor 1802–1807; John Grey Egerton 1807–1818; Viscount Belgrave 1818–1826	Succeeded by Lord Robert Grosvenor; Viscount Belgrave
Preceded by Edward Stanley; John Foster Barham	Member of Parliament for Stockbridge; 1826–1830; With: George Wilbraham	Succeeded by George Wilbraham; William Sloane-Stanley
Military offices
Preceded by Edmund Stevens	Colonel of the 65th Regiment of Foot; 1814–1851	Succeeded by Samuel Benjamin Auchmuty
Preceded by Charles Stuart	Colonel of the 97th (later 96th) Regiment of Foot; 1806–1814	Succeeded by Gordon Drummond
