= Auguste Lupin =

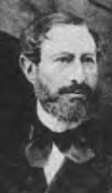
- Auguste Lupin in a photograph by Nader

Personal information
- Born: 21 February 1807 Paris, France
- Died: 26 September 1895 (aged 88) Paris, France
- Occupations: Racehorse owner and breeder

Horse racing career
- Sport: Horse racing

Significant horses
- Fiammetta, Jouvence, Potocki, Enguerrande, Xaintrailles

Auguste Lupin (21 February 1807–26 September 1895) was a French Thoroughbred racehorse owner and breeder that was called the "Father of the French Turf" for his role in promoting the development of horse racing in France. Born into a wealthy Parisian family, Lupin was a gentleman jockey in his early 20s and first began campaigning racehorses in 1832. While a few of the horses he bred in his early career did achieve racing success, his fortunes did not improve until the 1860s when won the.

== Early life and racing pursuits ==
Lupin was born on 21 February 1807 in Paris, France into a wealthy merchant family. His father owned a chateau on the Seine in Saint-Cloud that the family would visit in the summer. In his 20s, Lupin was a gentleman rider. His first racehorse was the mare Belida who did not excel at racing.

== Breeding and racing career ==
He established a stud farm in Saint-Cloud after purchasing three well-bred English broodmares at the liquidation of William IV's Hampton Court Stud in 1837.

== Later life ==
By 1880, he was the oldest proprietor of race-horses in France. Lupin was affected by paralysis in the last five years of his life, leading him to gradually withdraw from turf activities and sell most of his breeding stock by 1891. Lupin's nephew, the Comte, inherited his land holdings after Lupin died in Paris in 1895.
