= 1854 Grand National =

English steeplechase horse race

- Grand National
- Location: Aintree
- Date: 1 March 1854
- Winning horse: Bourton
- Starting price: 4/1 F
- Jockey: John Tasker
- Trainer: Henry Wadlow
- Owner: William Moseley
- Conditions: Good

The 1854 Grand National was the 16th official, 19th including unofficial, renewal of the Grand National horse race that took place at Aintree near Liverpool, England, on 1 March 1854.

== The Course ==
The New Hurdles, which had been the 29th fence on the circuit, and was jumped once, as the third last obstacle, and first on the home straight, was removed this year.

First circuit: Start At the field adjacent to the wheat field beyond the lane, Fence 1 {16} Ditch, Fence 2 {17} Low stump hedge and drain, Fence 3 {18} Post and Rails, Fence 4 {19} Old dead hedge with partial ditch on approach, Fence 5 {20} Becher's Brook, Fence 6 {21} Bank, Fence 7 {22} Bank and ditch, Fence 8 {23} Extreme Turn, Fence 9 {24} Valentine's Brook, Fence 10 {25} Hedge, Fence 11 {26} Post and rails, Fence 12 {27} Ditch, Fence 13 {28} Hedge at Canal Bridge.

The runners then turned at the first opportunity on re-entering the racecourse and made towards the fences in front of the stands. Fence 14 Hurdle at the distance post, Fence 15 Artificial water jump, 13' 6" wide with a 3' high rail and 4' brook.

Second circuit: The runners then turned away from the Grandstands again and crossed the lane, into the a field known as the wheat piece before following the same circuit until reaching the racecourse again. This time the runners continued to the wider extreme of the course before turning to run up the straight in front of the stands. Fence 29 Long length hurdles, Fence 30 Distance hurdle.

The runners then bypassed the Hurdle at the distance post and artificial Water Jump on the inside before reaching the winning post in front of the Main Stand.

== Leading Contenders ==
Miss Mowbray the 1852 winner and 1853 runner up was the hot favourite for weeks prior to the race and her position was strengthened with the suggestion that Jem Mason would come out of his recent retirement to partner her. However, suspicions began to rise that something was amiss when the Mare didn't take a customary prep circuit of the course the day before the race, instead performing only light walking exercises. Concerns grew on race day that she would be withdrawn and when the announcement came, just fifty-five minutes before the scheduled start, there were angry words among the spectators towards her connections. It later emerged that the mare had been got at, her foreleg deliberately blistered to such an extent that her withdrawal from this and every other race for the rest of the year was unavoidable.

Bourton had already been installed as clear 4/1 favourite on the day, despite having failed to impress on his two previous attempts at the race, failing to complete the course on each occasion.

Maurice Daley was the most popular of Tom Olliver's training quartet at 5/1 and received greater support on his surprise decision to partner the horse instead of Peter Simple on whom he'd won last year, or Half And Half, that most of the racegoers expected him to ride. It turned out that the choice wasn't Olliver's though and that he'd been told to partner Maurice Daley by his retaining owner, Mr Cartwright, which triggered an angry verbal exchange with Peter Simple's owner, Josey Little. The horse was taking part for the fourth time, having always been previously ridden by Charley Boyce, who steered him to runner up to Miss Mowbray two years earlier. It would be Olliver's record sixteenth ride in the race, having never yet missed an official running.

Half And Half was the second of the Tom Olliver quartet at 8/1 and backed heavily in the belief the trainer would be on board. His declaration to ride Maurice Daley instead, did nothing to diminish support for the horse who'd finished fourth in race two years earlier. Chris Green toom the ride.

Crabbs was the local favourite at 10/1 was to have been partnered as last year by Fowler, when the partnership was severed a mile from home. However, the rider took ill shortly before the race and Denny Wynne came in for his ninth ride in the race as a late replacement.

Peter Simple was the third of Olliver's quartet at 12/1 and aiming to try to become the first triple winner at the advanced age of sixteen. Owner, Captain Josey Little was incensed on hearing the trainer would not be reuniting with the horse on the instruction of Olliver's retained owner, leading to a heated row between Little and Mr Cartwright, despite the fact few people believed Olliver would ride the horse if given the choice. Charlie Boyce was booked for his fourth mount in the race.

Abd El Kader had also hoped to aim for a third win in the race but broke loose while riding in a train from The Curragh to Dublin, injuring an eye and foreleg sufficiently for the owner to decide it better not to risk the horse. The Colonel, Victress, Comeaway, Squire of Malton and Calmar were all also withdrawn before race day prior to Miss Mowbray joining their number.

== The Race ==
The twenty runners were sent off at the first time of asking with Crabbs, Maley and Burnt Sienna the first to show over the first ditch, Crabbs too up the running over the low stump hedge, post and rails and old dead hedge with the field intact going to Becher's for the first time.

Crabb's led over the brook, followed by Burnt Sienna, La Gazza Ladra, Maurice Daley, Bourton and Pride Of The North. but at the next fence, La Gazza Ladra refused, causing a pile up of baulked horses behind her as Royalty, Star Of England, Pride Of The North and Timothy were all brought to a standstill with no chance of clearing the Bank, while Geraldus was also badly impeded.

The fourteen who avoided the melee continued with Burnt Sienna upping the pace and opening up a six length advantage over Valentine's, with Crabbs another six lengths to the good over Lady Arthur and the rest of the field.

On re-entering the racecourse, the field began to bunch up again with Burnt Sienna's lead reduced to two lengths by the time she cleared the hurdle at the distance chair and the Artificial water jump. Lady Arthur lay 2nd, Spring 3rd, Bourton 4th, Maley 5th, Crabbs 6th and Cockcrow 7th. Geraldus lay 8th with Peter Simple 9th, Oscar 10th, Peter 11th and Half And Half 12th. The remainder were struggling adrift of the field with Maurice Daley 13th, La Gazza Ladra 14th, Star Of England 15th, Pride Of The North 16th and Shillibeer 17th and Bedford bringing up the rear while Timothy and Royalty were out of the race.

Burnt Sienna continued to make the running down to Becher's for the second time while behind her a gap left in the post and rails on the first circuit was aimed for by both Oscar and Peter. The pair collided, the former taking a bad fall, which left the horse with a nasty gash on his leg and jockey, Darling with a lacerated chin and neck, although, the crowd were pleased to see him quickly back on his feet and neither he nor the horse seriously hurt.

Burnt Sienna led Crabbs, Bourton, Lady Arthur and Maley over Bechers, while sixth placed Cockcrow's race ended with a fall the Bank. Tail ender Bedford suffered a horrible looking broken pastern injury at the Bank and ditch, causing him to fall, the vet having to euthanise the hose.

Burnt Sienna was still setting a good pace over the Extreme turn and Valentine's Brook before the long time leader's stride began to shorten approaching the Canal Bridge. Crabbs, Bourton, Spring, Maley, Peter Simple and Lady Arthur all poised to make their bid to win the race.

On reaching the far turn to line up for the Hurdles, Crabbs and Bourton swept past Burnt Sienna and made for the penultimate hurdle together. However, by the time they reached it, Bourton was starting to pull clear and, after clearing the final hurdle, was able to canter in to an easy fifteen length victory. Spring was second, ten lengths clear of third placed Crabbs with Maley a bad fourth with Lady Arthur fifth. Half And Half was one of four horses that broke down on the second circuit, completing most of the second circuit despite going lame to finish sixth with long time leader, Burnt Sienna in seventh, ahead of Geraldus also struggling in lame in eighth. Former winner, Peter Simple was in a very distressed state, passing the post in ninth, having run the last half mile after breaking down badly. Peter, La Gazza Ladra and Star Of England made straight for the stables without passing the post while Maurice Daley, Shillibeer and Pride Of The North, the latter being another who broke down, gave up the chase at the turn for home.

== Finishing Order ==
Position	Name	Jockey	Handicap (st-lb)	SP	Distance	Colours
Winner	Bourton	John Tasker	11–12	4-1	9 mins 59 secs	Red, white sash, black cap
Second	Spring	William Archer	9–10	20-1	15 lengths	Pink, black cap
Third	Crabbs	Denny Wynne	9–2	10-1	10 lengths	Yellow, black cap
Fourth	Maley	John Thrift	9–10	50-1		White, orange cap
Fifth	Lady Arthur	Tom Donaldson	9–10	50-1		Blue and white stripes, white cap, blue piping
Sixth	Half-And-Half	Chris Green	10–8	8-1	Broke down	White, black sleeves and cap
Seventh	Burnt Sienna	T. J. Burrows	8–12	25-1		
Eighth	Geraldus	Jack Debeau	9–8	50-1	Lame	Green, black cap
Ninth and last	Peter Simple	Charles Boyce	12–0	12-1	Broke down badly	White, black sleeves and cap
After final hurdle	Peter	Robert Sly Jr.	10–12	20-1	Pulled up	
Fence 22 {Bank and ditch}	Bedford	George Eatwell	10–4	50-1	Broke a pastern joint and fell {destroyed}	Red, white cap
Fence 21 {Bank}	Cockcrow	W. Maher	9–8	25-1	Fell	Light blue, black cap
Fence 18 {Post and rails}	Oscar	Sam Darling Jnr	11–12	15-1	Hampered by Peter & fell	Light blue, white cap
Fence 15 {Artificial water jump}	Maurice Daley	Tom Olliver	9–10	5-1	Tailed off, pulled up Fence 29	Pink, black cap
Fence 15 {Artificial water jump}	Shillibeer*	G. Southwell	9–0	50-1	Tailed off, pulled up fence 29	Wjite, yellow sleeves and cap
Fence 6 {Bank}	La Gazza Ladra	Tom Abbott	10–0	50-1	Refused, Carried on tailed off, Pulled up after final hurdle	Maroon, yellow sleeves, white cap
Fence 6 {Bank}	Pride of the North	Robert James	9–8	50-1	Baulked, Carried on tailed off, pulled up fence 29	Pink, white sleeves, black cap
Fence 6 {Bank}	Royalty	John Ennis	9–4	50-1	Baulked and refused	Yellow, black sleeves and cap
Fence 6 {Bank}	Star of England	Walter White	9–10	50-1	Baulked, Tailed off, pulled up fence 29	Black, red sleeves and cap
Fence 6 {Bank}	Timothy	Harry Lamplugh	9–6	40-1	Baulked and refused	White, black cap

- Shillibeer was listed as A gelding by Faugh-a-ballagh until the morning of the race, when officially named by owner, Lord Sefton

== Aftermath ==
The race was overshadowed by the circumstances of Miss Mowbray's withdrawal after it became clear she'd been got at, deflecting some of the attention from one death and a catalogue of injuries to other horses. Bedford had to be destroyed after shattering a pastern joint, landing over one of the fences while at least four other horses returned lame, including three of Tom Olliver's four entries. His fourth horse, Oscar suffered a gashed foreleg in a fall at the Post and rails while the horse's hoof slashed jockey, Sam Darling's chin and neck.
