= Sailor (horse) =

British Thoroughbred racehorse

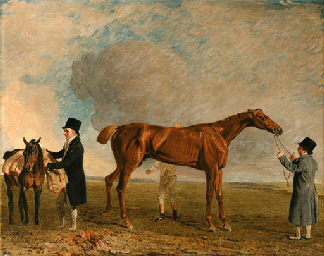
- Sailor, painting by Ben Marshall
- Sire: Scud
- Grandsire: Beningbrough
- Dam: Goosander
- Damsire: Hambletonian
- Sex: Stallion
- Foaled: 18 May 1817
- Country: United Kingdom of Great Britain and Ireland
- Colour: Chestnut
- Owner: Thomas Thornhill
- Trainer: William Chifney
- Record: 2: 2-0-0
- Earnings: £

Major wins
- Epsom Derby (1820)

Sailor (1817–1820) was a British Thoroughbred racehorse. In a brief racing career in the spring and summer of 1820 he won both of his races including The Derby. He collapsed and died on the Newmarket gallops shortly after his Derby win.

== Background ==
Sailor was a tall, leggy chestnut horse sired by Scud out of the mare Goosander. Goosander was a highly successful broodmare who also produced The Oaks winner Shoveler and was a sister to the dam of the Derby winner Sam. Sailor was trained by William Chifney and ridden in the Derby by Chifney’s younger brother, Sam Chifney, Jr. Chifney was one of the outstanding jockeys of his era, and one of the first to hold horses up in the early stages of a race before finishing strongly: he became famous for this tactic which became known as the "Chifney Rush".

== Racing career ==
Sailor was one of the leading fancies for the 1820 Derby before he appeared on a racecourse: in November 1819 he was being offered at odds of 15/1 for the race by British bookmakers. Sailor won a sweepstakes at Newmarket on his debut in spring 1820. The Derby was run in extremely difficult conditions at Epsom on Sailor's birthday on 18 May. A violent storm on the eve of the race demolished many of the tents and booths which had been set up on the downs and left the ground very soft, which suited Sailor. He started the second favourite at odds of 4/1 in a field of fifteen runners. In a fast-run race, Sailor won the Derby easily by two lengths from Abjer, with the favourite Pindarrie finishing fifth.

In the autumn of 1820, Sailor was being exercised on Newmarket Heath when he stumbled, staggered for two hundred yards and collapsed. He died on the spot from what was subsequently determined to be a burst blood vessel in his chest.

== Pedigree ==
Pedigree of Sailor (GB), chestnut 1817
Sire Scud (GB) 1804	Beningbrough; 1791	King Fergus*	Eclipse*
Sire Scud (GB) 1804	Beningbrough; 1791	King Fergus*	Creeping Polly*
Sire Scud (GB) 1804	Beningbrough; 1791	Fenwick’s Herod mare	Herod*
Sire Scud (GB) 1804	Beningbrough; 1791	Fenwick’s Herod mare	Pyrrha
Sire Scud (GB) 1804	Eliza; 1791	Highflyer*	Herod*
Sire Scud (GB) 1804	Eliza; 1791	Highflyer*	Rachel
Sire Scud (GB) 1804	Eliza; 1791	Augusta	Eclipse*
Sire Scud (GB) 1804	Eliza; 1791	Augusta	Herod mare*^
Dam Goosander (GB) 1805	Hambletonian; 1792	King Fergus*	Eclipse*
Dam Goosander (GB) 1805	Hambletonian; 1792	King Fergus*	Creeping Polly*
Dam Goosander (GB) 1805	Hambletonian; 1792	Grey Highflyer	Highflyer*^
Dam Goosander (GB) 1805	Hambletonian; 1792	Grey Highflyer	Monimia
Dam Goosander (GB) 1805	Rally; 1790	Trumpator	Conductor
Dam Goosander (GB) 1805	Rally; 1790	Trumpator	Brunette
Dam Goosander (GB) 1805	Rally; 1790	Fancy	Florizel*^
Dam Goosander (GB) 1805	Rally; 1790	Fancy	sister to Juno (Family: 6-c)

* Sailor is inbred 3S x 3D to the stallion King Fergus, meaning that he appears third generation on the sire side of his pedigree and third generation on the dam side of his pedigree.

* Sailor is inbred 3S x 4D to the stallion Highflyer, meaning that he appears third generation on the sire side of his pedigree and fourth generation on the dam side of his pedigree.

*^ Sailor is inbred 4S x 4S x 5S x 5D x 5D to the stallion Herod, meaning that he appears fourth generation twice and fifth generation once (via Herod mare)^ on the sire side of his pedigree and fifth generation twice (via Highflyer and Florizel)^ on the dam side of his pedigree.

* Sailor is inbred 4S x 4S x 4D to the stallion Eclipse, meaning that he appears fourth generation twice on the sire side of his pedigree and fourth generation once on the dam side of his pedigree.
