= Sam (horse) =

British-bred Thoroughbred racehorse

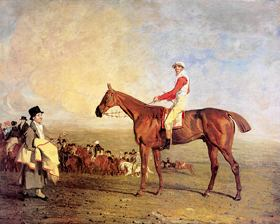
- "Sam with Sam Chifney up" by Benjamin Marshall.
- Sire: Scud
- Grandsire: Beningbrough
- Dam: Goosander
- Damsire: Hambletonian
- Sex: Stallion
- Foaled: 1815
- Country: United Kingdom of Great Britain and Ireland
- Colour: Brown
- Breeder: Thomas Thornhill
- Owner: Thomas Thornhill
- Trainer: R. Perren; Samuel & William Chifney
- Record: 9:3-2-3

Major wins
- Epsom Derby (1818)

Sam (1815 – after 1827) was a British Thoroughbred racehorse and sire. In a career that lasted from April 1818 to May 1819 he ran nine times and won three races. In May 1818 he defeated fifteen opponents to record his most important win in The Derby. His only other wins came in a walkover and a match race. After running without success as a four-year-old, Sam was retired to stud but made no impact as a sire of winners.

== Background ==
Sam was described as a "low, lengthy and plain sort of horse, with a sour countenance, and a delicate constitution," sired by the Doncaster Cup winner Scud out of the mare Hyale. Hyale produced several other winners and was a half-sister to Goosander, a highly successful broodmare who produced The Oaks winner Shoveler and the Derby winner Sailor. Sam was bred by his owner, Thomas Thornhill at his stud at Riddlesworth, Norfolk, and trained by Thornhill's father-in-law, Mr Perren.

Sam was named after his regular jockey Sam Chifney, Jr. Chifney was one of the outstanding jockeys of his era, and one of the first to hold horses up in the early stages of a race before finishing strongly: he became famous for this tactic which became known as the "Chifney Rush". He eventually became the joint-trainer of the colt that bore his name.

== Racing career ==
=== 1818: three-year-old season ===
Sam was unraced as a two-year-old and made his debut at Newmarket on 13 April 1818 when he ran in the Riddlesworth Stakes, a race for three-year-olds which at that time was regarded as being equal in status to the Classics. He started at odds of 9/1 and finished unplaced behind Prince Paul. Three days later he was able to record his first "win" when he was allowed to walk over for a 100 guinea sweepstakes after his only rival, a colt by Walton owned by the Duke of Rutland, was withdrawn from the race.

Sam had training problems before the Derby, jeopardising the £15,000 which Thornhill stood to take in winning bets. Despite his lack of a win in a competitive race he started 7/2 second favourite on 28 May at Epsom, with Prince Paul being made 11/5 favourite. There were ten false starts for the race before the starter announced that the next attempt would be the final one, regardless of whether or not the sixteen jockeys were ready. Prince Paul made the early running but tired in the straight and Sam Chifney was able to produce his colt with a late run to win comfortably by three-quarters of a length from an unnamed 50/1 outsider (later named Raby), with Prince Paul third. The hard, dry ground meant that for much of the race the runners were obscured by a cloud of dust. After the race the training of the colt was taken over by Chifney and his older brother William.

After a break of four months, Sam returned for the autumn meetings at Newmarket where he ran four times. On 28 September, he ran a 200-guinea match race over a mile against Fitzcloddy, a colt who had finished unplaced at Epsom. Sam started the 2/5 favourite, but failed to concede eight pounds to his opponent. Two days later he started 6/5 favourite for a subscription plate "across the flat" (ten furlongs), in which he finished second of the eight runners behind Allegro.

On 15 October Sam ran in a 200-guinea sweepstakes over a sprint distance of six furlongs and finished last of the three runners behind a filly named Carrots. On his final start of the season, Sam ran a match over ten furlongs against the Duke of Rutland's Walton colt– the same horse that had been withdrawn from the sweepstakes in April. Sam conceded two pounds and defeated his opponent to claim a prize of 200 guineas.

=== 1819: four-year-old season ===
Sam failed to show any worthwhile form in two races in the spring of 1819. On 15 April he started joint favourite for the two mile Claret Stakes at Newmarket but finished last of the three runners behind Allegro and The Oaks winner Corinne. A month later he finished last of three again in the four-mile Jockey Club Stakes in which he was receiving twenty-three pounds from the winner Cannon-ball. After this race he was sold by Thornhill to a Mr Charlton.

Sam did not race again. He was entered for a match race against a filly named Fanny at the Newmarket Craven meeting in April 1820, but did not appear and Mr Charlton paid a forfeit.

== Stud career ==
Sam began his stud career at Ludford near Ludlow in Shropshire alongside the more established stallion Castrel. His initial fee was 10 guineas for thoroughbred mares or 2 guineas for half-breds. He made no impact as a stallion attracting few mares other than those of Mr Thornhill. His last known foals were conceived in 1827.

== Pedigree ==
Pedigree of Sam (GB), chestnut 1815
Sire Scud (GB) 1804	Beningbrough; 1791	King Fergus	Eclipse*
Sire Scud (GB) 1804	Beningbrough; 1791	King Fergus	Creeping Polly
Sire Scud (GB) 1804	Beningbrough; 1791	Fenwick’s Herod mare	Herod*
Sire Scud (GB) 1804	Beningbrough; 1791	Fenwick’s Herod mare	Pyrrha
Sire Scud (GB) 1804	Eliza; 1791	Highflyer	Herod*
Sire Scud (GB) 1804	Eliza; 1791	Highflyer	Rachel
Sire Scud (GB) 1804	Eliza; 1791	Augusta	Eclipse*
Sire Scud (GB) 1804	Eliza; 1791	Augusta	Herod mare*^
Dam Hyale (GB) 1797	Phoenomenon; 1780	Herod*	Tartar
Dam Hyale (GB) 1797	Phoenomenon; 1780	Herod*	Cypron
Dam Hyale (GB) 1797	Phoenomenon; 1780	Frenzy	Eclipse*
Dam Hyale (GB) 1797	Phoenomenon; 1780	Frenzy	Engineer mare
Dam Hyale (GB) 1797	Rally; 1790	Trumpator	Conductor
Dam Hyale (GB) 1797	Rally; 1790	Trumpator	Brunette
Dam Hyale (GB) 1797	Rally; 1790	Fancy	Florizel*^
Dam Hyale (GB) 1797	Rally; 1790	Fancy	sister to Juno (Family: 6-b)

*^ Sam is inbred 4S x 4S x 5S x 3D x 5D to the stallion Herod, meaning that he appears fourth generation twice and fifth generation once (via Herod mare)^ on the sire side of his pedigree and third generation once and fifth generation once (via Florizel)^ on the dam side of his pedigree.

* Sam is inbred 4S x 4S x 4D to the stallion Eclipse, meaning that he appears fourth generation twice on the sire side of his pedigree and fourth generation once on the dam side of his pedigree.
