= King Fergus =

British Thoroughbred racehorse

- Sire: Eclipse
- Grandsire: Marske
- Dam: Creeping Polly
- Damsire: Othello
- Sex: Male
- Foaled: 1775
- Country: Great Britain
- Colour: Chestnut
- Breeder: Mr Carver
- Owner: Dennis O'Kelly; John Croke

Major wins
- 500 guineas sweepstakes at Bath (1779)

Awards
- Leading sire in Great Britain and Ireland (1797)

King Fergus (1775–1801) was a British Thoroughbred racehorse. He won several races, but achieved greater success as a sire. He was British Champion sire in 1797 and his progeny included St Leger Stakes winner Hambletonian, who was only defeated once in his 19 race career.

== Background ==
King Fergus was a chestnut colt bred by Mr Carver and foaled in 1775. He was sired by the undefeated Eclipse. Eclipse was also one of the leading sires of the time, with his progeny also including Pot-8-Os, Saltram, Serjeant and Young Eclipse. King Fergus was the ninth foal of Creeping Polly, a daughter of Othello. King Fergus grew to stand 16 hands high and was "remarkably full of bone, great sinews, well shaped, and free from blemishes."

== Racing career ==
King Fergus only raced once as a three-year-old, finishing second to Miss Wickham at Bath. At Bath on 27 September 1779 he started as the 1/5 favourite to win a 500 guineas sweepstakes and beat Cinderwench to win the four-mile race. In October he was due to race Sir John Lade's Bet Boucher over two miles, but Lade paid a forfeit.

In 1780, on the Monday of Newmarket's second spring meeting, he beat Sir John Lade's Knight Errant. Two days later at Newmarket he raced against Dorimant and Pot-8-Os in a 140 guineas race. King Fergus was leading as they passed the stands, but cast a shoe. Pot-8-Os won, with King Fergus in second place. In May 1780, at Epsom, he won a £50 race comprising three four-mile heats. He beat Epsom, Jugurtha, Don Joseph, Chance, Neptune, Holyhock and Foppington, with King Fergus starting as the favourite (priced at about 8/11). In October he beat the Duke of Cumberland's Pomona of three miles to win 200 guineas. Later in the month he beat Lord Derby's Guildford (who had started as the 1/2 favourite) to win 200 guineas. Two days later he beat five rivals to win a subscription stakes of five guineas each. Lord Grosvenor's Truth had started as the 4/6 favourite, with King Fergus at 7/4.

King Fergus started the 1781 season at the first spring meeting at Newmarket, where he beat Whizgig, Prince Ferdinand, Young Tantrum, Little Isaac, Knight Errant and Tantini to win £50. Whizgig had started as the 6/4 favourite, with King Fergus at 2/1. At the same meeting he walked over for another £50. He later broke down and was retired from racing.

His final race came in 1784, when he was put back into training. He finished second to Chocolate in the Lord Lieutenant's Purse at the Curragh.

== Stud career ==
After retiring from racing in 1781 he was purchased by John Croke, to stand as a stallion in Ireland. After standing a few seasons in Ireland he returned to England and 1786 he stood at Red Lion Livery-Stables near Park Lane, Piccadilly, Piccadilly for a fee of 5gns and 5s. In 1787 he stood in Catterick in Yorkshire, before moving to Shipton. By 1790 his fee had risen to 10gns and 10s 6d. 1792 he moved from Shipton to Maidenhead and stood for a fee of 15gns and 10s 6d. He returned to Shipton in 1793, with his fee rising again to 20gns and 10s 6d. For the next few years of his stud career he moved about from year to year, standing at Egham, Shipton, Turnford and Cambridge from 1794 to 1797. The last few years of his life were spent in Boroughshire and by 1800 he fee had dropped back to 10gns and 10s 6d.

He served very few mares in Ireland and his most notable son he produced there was Honest Tom, who won 24 races. In England King Fergus sired many top horses and was British Champion sire in 1797. He died in 1801.

=== Notable progeny ===
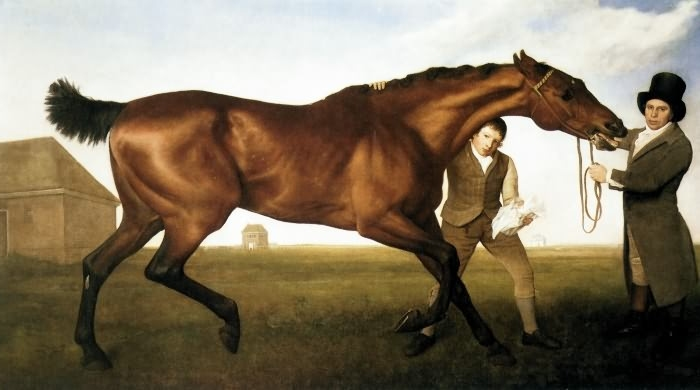
Painting of King Fergus' son Hambletonian

s = stallion, m = mare

Foaled	Name	Sex	Major Wins
1785	Honest Tom	s
1788	Overton	s	Doncaster Cup
1788	Young Traveller	s	St Leger Stakes, Doncaster Cup
1789	Ormond	s	5yo Great Subscription Purse, 6yo+ Great Subscription Purse
1791	Beningbrough	s	St Leger Stakes, Doncaster Cup
1792	Hambletonian	s	St Leger Stakes, Doncaster Cup (twice)
1794	Warter	s	Lichfield King's Plate, Burford King's Plate, Guildford King's Plate

King Fergus was the damsire to Epsom Oaks winner Scotia. His son Overton was the sire of St Leger and Doncaster Cup winner Cockfighter. Beningbrough produced St Leger and Doncaster Cup winner Orville, Doncaster Cup winner Scud, Epsom Oaks and 4yo Great Subscription Purse winner Oriana, Epsom Oaks winner Briseis and another Doncaster Cup winner Trophonius. Hambletonian sired Doncaster Cup winner Camillus. It is through Hambletonian's son Whitelock that King Fergus' sire line continues. Whitelock was the sire of Blacklock, who was the grandsire of Epsom Derby winner Voltigeur.

== Sire line tree ==
Sire line King Fergus descendant tree
- King Fergus
  - Honest Tom
  - Overton
    - Cockboat
    - Cockfighter
      - Gilliver
      - Merryfield
    - John O'Groat
    - Rolla
    - Alonzo
  - Poor Jack
  - Young Traveller
  - Ormond
  - Beningbrough
    - Ashton
    - Blue Devil
    - Harefoot
    - Orville
      - Octavius
        - Little John
        - Black-and-all-black
        - Sir Huldebrand
        - Cricketer
      - Muley
        - Robin Hood
        - Morisco
        - Outlaw
        - Leviathan
        - Rector
        - Marvel
        - Margrave
        - Muley Moloch
        - Dick
        - Muleyson
        - Gil Blas
        - King Of Clubs
        - Gilbert Gurney
        - Dulcimer
        - The Little Known
        - Drayton
        - Gibraltar
        - Hautboy
        - Little Wonder
        - Snoozer
      - Belville
      - Dinmont
      - Fulford
      - Don Juan
      - Ebor
      - Fitz Orville
        - Windfall
      - Allegro
      - Master Henry
      - Andrew
        - Cadland
      - Richard
      - Bizarre
        - Mus
      - Emilius
        - Agreeable
        - Priam
        - Recovery
        - St Nicholas
        - Tantivy
        - Chapman
        - Ciudad Rodrigo
        - Exile
        - Marcus
        - Riddlesworth
        - Sarpedon
        - Young Emilius
        - Hawker
        - Lucius
        - Mosquito
        - Plentipotentiary
        - Coriolanus
        - Operator
        - Young Emilius
        - Mango
        - Riddlesworth
        - The Steamer
        - Euclid
        - Mercer
        - Sovereign
        - Record
        - Theon
        - Pompey
        - The Caster
        - Elemi
        - Tragical
        - Mathematician
        - Gambetti
      - Ganymede
      - Vargas
      - Pollio
    - Delville
    - Rygantino
    - Thorn
    - Bedalian
    - Hylas
    - Phlebotomist
    - Scud
      - Sam
      - Steeltrap
        - Chancellor
      - Sailor
      - Actaeon
        - General Chasse
        - St Martin
        - Albion
        - John Bull
        - Gallant
    - Windle
    - Trophonius
    - Prince of Orange
  - Brother to Overton
  - Deserter
  - Hambletonian
    - Camillus
      - Oiseau
        - Flamingo
        - Rowton
        - Revolution
      - Magistrate
        - Valentine
        - Terror
      - Rhadamanthus
      - Consul
    - Whitelock
      - Blacklock
        - Blue Beard
        - Brutandorf
        - Buzzard
        - Greylock
        - Streatham
        - Brownlock
        - Cock Robin
        - Crowcatcher
        - Hazard
        - Belzoni
        - Laurel
        - Malek
        - Popsy
        - Robin Hood
        - Silverlock
        - Sparkler
        - The Deer
        - Ben Lomond
        - Black Heddon
        - Clinton
        - Jour De Noces
        - Olympus
        - Pelion
        - Poor Fellow
        - Splinter Bar
        - Velocipede
        - Young Blacklock
        - Agitator
        - Bolivar
        - Navarino
        - Niger
        - Robin Redbreast
        - Tamboff
        - Thatcher
        - Tranby
        - Voltaire
        - Wodenblock
        - Acis
        - Apuntador
        - Bryan
        - Crescent
        - Belshazzar
    - Camerton
      - Bay Camerton
    - Anticipation
  - Garswood
  - Johnny
    - Master Jackey
  - Warter

== Pedigree ==
Pedigree of King Fergus, chestnut stallion, 1775
Sire Eclipse (GB) ch. 1764	Marske br. 1750	Squirt ch. 1732	Bartlett's Childers
Sire Eclipse (GB) ch. 1764	Marske br. 1750	Squirt ch. 1732	Sister to Old Country Wench
Sire Eclipse (GB) ch. 1764	Marske br. 1750	The Ruby Mare	Blacklegs
Sire Eclipse (GB) ch. 1764	Marske br. 1750	The Ruby Mare	Bay Bolton mare
Sire Eclipse (GB) ch. 1764	Spilletta b. 1749	Regulus ch. 1739	Godolphin Arabian
Sire Eclipse (GB) ch. 1764	Spilletta b. 1749	Regulus ch. 1739	Grey Robinson
Sire Eclipse (GB) ch. 1764	Spilletta b. 1749	Mother Western; 1731	Easby Snake
Sire Eclipse (GB) ch. 1764	Spilletta b. 1749	Mother Western; 1731	Old Montagu mare
Dam Creeping Polly (GB) ch. 1756	Othello blk. 1743	Crab gr. 1722	Alcock's Arabian
Dam Creeping Polly (GB) ch. 1756	Othello blk. 1743	Crab gr. 1722	Sister to Soreheels
Dam Creeping Polly (GB) ch. 1756	Othello blk. 1743	Miss Slamerkin b. 1729	Young True Blue
Dam Creeping Polly (GB) ch. 1756	Othello blk. 1743	Miss Slamerkin b. 1729	Oxford Dun Arabian mare
Dam Creeping Polly (GB) ch. 1756	Fanny; 1751	Tartar ch. 1743	Partner
Dam Creeping Polly (GB) ch. 1756	Fanny; 1751	Tartar ch. 1743	Meliora
Dam Creeping Polly (GB) ch. 1756	Fanny; 1751	Starling mare	Bolton Starling
Dam Creeping Polly (GB) ch. 1756	Fanny; 1751	Starling mare	Flying Childers mare

Note: b. = Bay, blk. = Black, br. = Brown, ch. = Chestnut, gr. = Grey
