= John Barham Day =

British jockey and trainer (1793–1860)

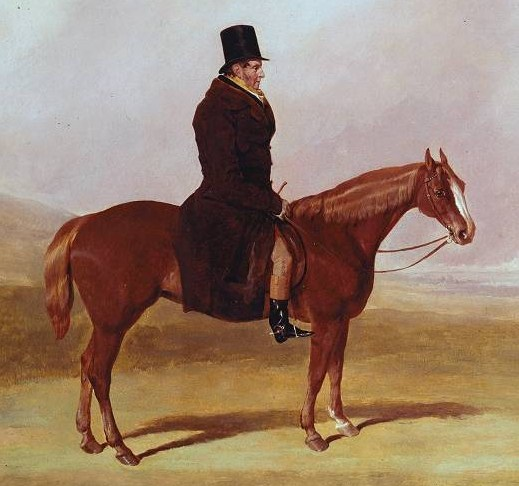
- John Barham Day at Newmarket in 1841, detail of painting by Harry Hall

Personal information
- Born: 1793 Great Britain
- Died: 1860 (aged 66–67)
- Occupations: Jockey; Trainer

Horse racing career
- Sport: Horse racing

Major racing wins
- British Classic Race wins as jockey: 2000 Guineas (4); 1000 Guineas (5); Epsom Oaks (5); St. Leger Stakes (2) British Classic Race wins as trainer: 2000 Guineas (3); 1000 Guineas (3); Epsom Oaks (1)

Significant horses
- Pussy, Grey Momus, Problem, May-day, Turquoise, Oxygen, Chapeau d'Espagne, Crucifix, Virago.

John Barham Day (1793–1860) was a British jockey and trainer. For much of his career he was usually known simply as John Day; when his son of the same name rose to prominence, the older man was referred to as John Barham Day, John Day, Sr. or Old John Day. A member of a highly successful racing family, Day first made his name as a jockey in the 1820s and rode the winners of sixteen classics before retiring. In the mid-1830s he set up as a trainer of racehorses at Danebury near Stockbridge. He established a reputation as a shrewd and skillful handler of horses and specialised in landing betting coups. Horses trained by Day won seven classics between 1838 and 1854, during which time he was regarded as the leading trainer in the South of England and the main rival of the Yorkshire-based John Scott. He was known as "Honest John", but the sobriquet appears to have been applied ironically.

== Background ==
Day was born in 1793 at Houghton Down in Hampshire, the son of a horse trainer named John Day: Barham was his mother's maiden name. Four of Day's brothers became jockeys, including Samuel Day (1802–1866) who rode three winners of The Derby.

== Riding career ==
Day began his career as a jockey when in his mid-teens, but had limited success until he was over thirty. In the mid-1820s he attracted the attention of the Duke of Grafton and began to ride regularly at the major meetings at Newmarket. His first important successes came in the spring of 1826, when he rode the Duke's horses Dervise and Problem to win the 2000 Guineas and 1000 Guineas respectively. The Duke gave his jockey a present of £20, which was considered generous at the time. Day had further classic success for his patron, winning The Oaks on Turquoise in 1828 and Oxygen in 1831, and also rode several winners for King George IV.

Even by the standards of the time, Day was a small, light jockey and was able to ride at weights as low as seven stones until the end of his career. He was known for his skill and tactical awareness but was never considered a stylish rider and lacked the strength of heavier jockeys. He was also known to bet heavily and gained a reputation for being less than trustworthy.

== Training career ==
In 1835, Day, whilst continuing his career as a jockey, took up training at Danebury, a few miles from Stockbridge. His first major patron was the wealthy and powerful Lord George Bentinck who invested heavily in the Danebury yard, enabling Day to build one of the largest and best-equipped training establishments in the country. For Bentinck, Day trained and rode the classic winners Chapeau d'Espagne (1000 Guineas, 1837) and Grey Momus (2000 Guineas, 1838). In 1840 Day sent out Bentinck's outstanding filly Crucifix to win the 2000 Guineas, 1000 Guineas and Oaks, riding her in the first two races. In 1841 Day and Bentinck split acrimoniously, and became bitter rivals until Lord George gave up racing five years later. According to one story, the break came after Bentinck discovered that Day had been deliberately misleading him about the form of one of his horses, encouraging him to bet on the horse when the trainer was secretly wagering against him. During this time, Day had further success, training horses for, among others, Lord Palmerston, as well as winning the 2000 Guineas in 1844 with his own horse, The Ugly Buck.

In 1847 Day left Danebury to become the private trainer to Henry Padwick at Michel Grove near Findon in West Sussex. For Padwick, Day trained Virago, whom he considered the best horse he ever handled. Day deliberately prevented the filly from showing her true form in order to secure a light weight in handicap races, and then landed a huge betting coup when the filly captured the Great Metropolitan Handicap and the City and Suburban Handicap on the same day at Epsom in 1854. The relationship with Padwick ended in the following year when the owner was unhappy with the preparation given to his colt St Hubert, the beaten favourite for the 2000 Guineas. The winner of the race was trained by Day's son and Padwick suspected collusion between the family members.

Day retired from training after the breakdown of his relationship with Padwick and died five years later, on 21 March 1860.

== Family and legacy ==
Day had twelve children with his first wife, and four of them achieved success on the turf. Samuel Goddard Day (c.1818–1838), not to be confused with his uncle, was a talented jockey who won the St Leger on Mango in 1837 but died after a hunting accident eight months later at the age of 19. John Day (1819–1883) had his biggest success as a jockey when riding The Ugly Buck for his father. As a trainer he took over the Danebury stable and eclipsed his father's success by winning twelve classics including three Derbys with Pyrrhus the First, Cossack and Andover. William Day (1823–1908) trained at Woodyates and was responsible for sending out Lord of the Isles to beat St Hubert in the 1855 2000 Guineas, the race which effectively ended his father's career. He trained two other classic winners, but his best horse was the American-bred Foxhall, which won the Grand Prix de Paris, Cesarewitch Handicap and Cambridgeshire Handicap in 1881. John Barham Day lived with William during his retirement. A fourth son, Alfred Day (born 1830), nicknamed "King Alfred", was a successful jockey, winning seven classics between 1849 and 1859, including the Derby on Andover. John Barham Day's granddaughter Catherine went on to marry Tom Cannon, Sr. who took over the running of Danebury and fathered four sons - Morny, Kempton, Tom Jr. and Charles who all became successful jockeys, and a daughter Margaret, who was grandmother to Lester Piggott.

Whilst training at Michel Grove, Day took on an apprentice named John Porter who went on to become one of the most successful British trainers of the late 19th century.
