= Virago (horse) =

British Thoroughbred racehorse

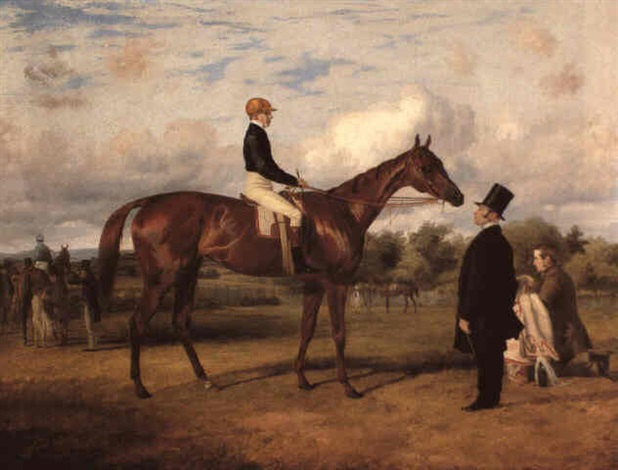
- Virago with jockey Wells and trainer J. B. Day by Thomas Barratt
- Sire: Pyrrhus The First
- Grandsire: Epirus
- Dam: Virginia
- Damsire: Rowton
- Sex: Mare
- Foaled: 1851
- Country: United Kingdom
- Colour: Chestnut
- Breeder: Robert Stephenson
- Owner: "Mr Howard"
- Trainer: John Barham Day
- Record: 16:11-0-1
- Earnings: ca. £10,000

Major wins
- Great Metropolitan Handicap (1854); City and Suburban Handicap (1854); 1000 Guineas (1854); Nassau Stakes (1854); Goodwood Cup (1854); Yorkshire Oaks (1854); Doncaster Cup (1854)

Virago (1851–1869) was a British Thoroughbred racehorse and broodmare. In a career which lasted from November 1853 to July 1855 she ran sixteen times and won eleven races. All but one of her victories came as a three-year-old in 1854, a year in which she dominated British racing, winning major events at distances ranging from one mile to three miles. Her wins included the classic 1000 Guineas at Newmarket, the Nassau Stakes and the Yorkshire Oaks against her own age and sex. More notable were her successes in open competition, including the Goodwood and Doncaster Cups and three of the season's most valuable handicap races. She was regarded by many British experts as one of the greatest racehorses of the 19th century.

== Background ==
Virago, a dark chestnut filly with one white foot who stood 16 hands high, was bred, like the Derby winner Voltigeur, by Robert Stephenson at his stud at Hart, near Hartlepool, County Durham. Virago was described as "more racing-looking than handsome" and having a "quiet and docile" temperament. As a yearling, she was bought for either £300, £350 or £460 (sources differ) at the Doncaster sales by Henry Padwick, a notorious moneylender who used the name "Mr. Howard" for his racing interests, with John Scott as the underbidder. John Barham Day, who was ironically known as "Honest John", trained the filly at Padwick's stable at Findon, West Sussex. According to his son William, later a successful trainer in his own right, Day believed that he had acquired "the finest yearling in the world".

Virago was sired by the 1846 Epsom Derby winner Pyrrhus The First. Her dam, Virginia, became an influential broodmare, with her direct descendants including the 1000 Guineas and Epsom Oaks winner Thebais, the Preakness Stakes winner War Cloud, and the Italian champion Ribot.

== Racing career ==
=== 1853: two-year-old season ===
Day ran Virago in her first serious private trial in October 1853 and was so impressed that he offered to buy the filly from Padwick for £3,000, but his offer was rebuffed. Virago showed none of her ability on her only racecourse appearance of 1853, finishing well beaten in the Astley House Selling Stakes at Shrewsbury Racecourse in November. In fact, Day had made sure that Virago would not produce her true running by having her accompanied to the start by a stable lad who was instructed to hold onto the filly until the rest of the runners had gone at least fifty yards. The purpose of the run was to qualify Virago for handicap races with an unrealistically low rating.

=== 1854: three-year-old season ===
In spring 1854 Virago was matched against the five-year-old Little Harry (winner of the Ascot Stakes) in a two and a quarter mile private trial race and won easily, receiving only ten pounds (the modern weight-for-age scale suggests that a three-year-old filly should have been receiving approximately thirty-nine pounds from a five-year-old horse at this time of year). Virago began her public three-year-old season at the Epsom Spring meeting on 6 April. The highlights of the meeting were two valuable all-aged handicap races run on the same afternoon: the Great Metropolitan Handicap over two and a quarter miles, and the one and a quarter mile City and Suburban Handicap. Virago, weighted according to her moderate two-year-old form, carried 88 pounds to victory in the City and Suburban, winning by three lengths from twenty opponents, at odds of 7/4. She turned out again immediately to win the "Great Met" by a length under 84 pounds.

On 25 May Virago won the Great Northern Handicap over two miles at York, winning easily by a length from sixteen opponents at odds of 4/6 to take a first prize of more than £2,000. The following day, at the same meeting, she won the Flying Dutchman Handicap over one and a half miles at odds of 1/4. Her performances made such an impression that only two fillies appeared to oppose her in the 1000 Guineas at Newmarket Racecourse a week later. Virago was ridden to victory in the one-mile classic by John Wells at odds of 1/3, beating Meteora by a neck. This race was her only classic engagement: Virago was not entered in The Derby, The Oaks or the St. Leger Stakes.

At Goodwood in July, Virago contested the two and a half mile Goodwood Cup, one of the season's most prestigious weight-for-age races. She was made 1/6 favourite and won by fifteen lengths from Indian Warrior. When she added a win in the Nassau Stakes for fillies at the same meeting, her superiority was so evident that no official odds were recorded. In August Virago returned to York and ran twice. She won the Yorkshire Oaks, and then suffered her only defeat of the year when she was beaten by a two-year-old filly named Ellermire in a six-furlong County Plate. William Day felt that the switch to sprint distances was ill-advised and claimed that Virago only ran in the race because Padwick overruled her trainer's wishes.

On 5 September Virago won the Warwick Cup over three miles at Warwick Racecourse, taking the race by six lengths from a field that included the Oaks winner Mincemeat and Kingston, who had finished second by a head to West Australian in the Ascot Gold Cup. On her last start of 1854, Virago traveled to Doncaster in mid September and won the Doncaster Cup "in a canter" from Kingston, the only horse to oppose her. In all, Virago won ten of her eleven starts in 1854, took £9,750 in prize money, and earned her owner a further £80,000 in winning bets.

=== 1855: four-year-old season ===
Virago developed respiratory problems towards the end of her three-year-old season. These problems became more serious in 1855 and Virago failed to reproduce her best form. She won the Port Stakes at Newmarket in spring, but her performances deteriorated thereafter. At Ascot she was beaten in the Royal Hunt Cup and finished third to Fandango in the Ascot Gold Cup. She was retired after running unplaced in the Craven Stakes at Goodwood and was sold to Lord Stradbroke for £500.

== Assessment ==
In May 1886 The Sporting Times carried out a poll of one hundred racing experts to create a ranking of the best British racehorses of the 19th century. Despite having been retired more than thirty years previously, Virago was ranked in the top ten by thirty-six of the contributors, placing her seventh among all horses and making her the highest-rated filly or mare. In a related poll, the electors were asked to choose the single greatest horse they had ever seen. In this poll, Virago finished fifth behind Gladiateur, Isonomy, West Australian, and St. Simon.

At the end of her three-year-old season, Virago was rated eight pounds superior to the Derby winner Andover.

== Breeding record ==
Virago had some success as a broodmare. After being covered by her racecourse rival Kingston, she produced Thalestris, who won the Cesarewitch Handicap in 1864. Virago died in 1869.

== Pedigree ==
Pedigree of Virago (GB), chestnut mare, 1851
Sire Pyrrhus The First (GB) 1843	Epirus; 1834	Langar	Selim*
Sire Pyrrhus The First (GB) 1843	Epirus; 1834	Langar	Walton mare
Sire Pyrrhus The First (GB) 1843	Epirus; 1834	Olympia	Sir Oliver
Sire Pyrrhus The First (GB) 1843	Epirus; 1834	Olympia	Scotilla
Sire Pyrrhus The First (GB) 1843	Fortress; 1836	Defence	Whalebone
Sire Pyrrhus The First (GB) 1843	Fortress; 1836	Defence	Defiance
Sire Pyrrhus The First (GB) 1843	Fortress; 1836	Jewess	Moses
Sire Pyrrhus The First (GB) 1843	Fortress; 1836	Jewess	Calendulae
Dam Virginia (GB) 1835	Rowton; 1826	Oiseau	Camillus
Dam Virginia (GB) 1835	Rowton; 1826	Oiseau	Ruler mare
Dam Virginia (GB) 1835	Rowton; 1826	Katherina	Woful
Dam Virginia (GB) 1835	Rowton; 1826	Katherina	Landscape
Dam Virginia (GB) 1835	Pucelle; 1821	Muley	Orville
Dam Virginia (GB) 1835	Pucelle; 1821	Muley	Eleanor
Dam Virginia (GB) 1835	Pucelle; 1821	Medora	Selim*
Dam Virginia (GB) 1835	Pucelle; 1821	Medora	Sir Harry mare (Family:4-l)

* Virago is inbred 4S x 4D to the stallion Selim, meaning that he appears fourth generation on the sire side of her pedigree and fourth generation on the dam side of her pedigree.
