= John Day (horseman) =

British jockey and trainer (1819–1883)

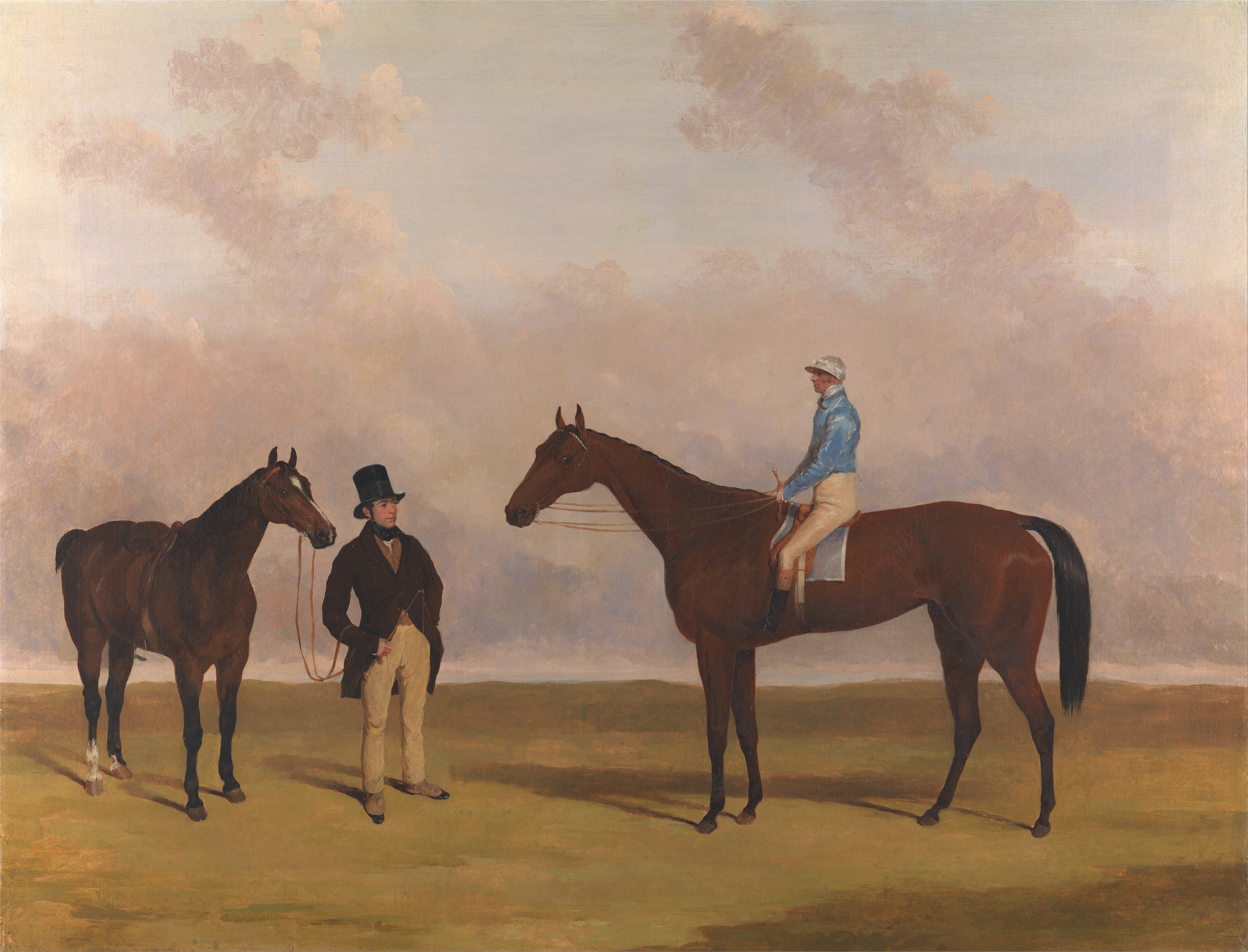
- Crucifix with John Day Up

Personal information
- Born: c. 1819 Hampshire, United Kingdom
- Died: 1883
- Occupation: Trainer

Horse racing career
- Sport: Horse racing

Major racing wins
- British Classic Race wins as jockey: 2000 Guineas (1) British Classic Race wins as trainer: 2000 Guineas (3); 1000 Guineas (4); Epsom Derby (3); Epsom Oaks (2)

Significant horses
- The Ugly Buck, Mendicant, Pyrrhus The First, Cossack, Andover, Lady Elizabeth

John Day (c. 1819–1883) was a British jockey and trainer. A member of a large and highly successful racing family Day was sometimes known as Young John Day or John Day, Jr. to distinguish him from his father John Barham Day. The younger John Day had some success as a jockey before taking over from his father as the trainer at the Danebury stables in 1847. In a training career of over thirty years Day sent out the winners of twelve classics including three winners of The Derby. Like many trainers of his time, Day was a heavy gambler and clashed on several occasions with other leading turf figures.

== Background ==
Day was one of twelve children of the jockey and trainer John Barham Day, making him the nephew of the jockey Sam Day. John's brothers included William Day, who trained three classic winners, and the successful jockeys Samuel and Alfred.

== Riding career ==
Day began his career as a jockey when in his mid-teens, and showed a good deal of promise. He rode many horses for his father whose training facility at Danebury, near Stockbridge in Hampshire was one of the largest and most successful in England. In 1844 he rode The Ugly Buck, owned and trained by his father to win the 2000 Guineas at Newmarket.

== Training career ==
In 1846, John Barham Day moved away from Danebury to take up a post as private trainer to Henry Padwick, leaving John Jr. to take over the Danebury stable. In his first year as a trainer he sent out Pyrrhus The First to win the Derby and won both the 1000 Guineas and Oaks with the filly Mendicant. Both horses were owned by John Gully for whom he later trained The Hermit and Andover to win the 2000 Guineas and Derby respectively in 1854.

In the 1860s the main patron of the Danebury yard was the Duke of Beaufort. Day's successes for the Duke included the 2000 Guineas winner Vauban and the classic winning fillies Siberia and Scottish Queen. All three of these horses were ridden by George Fordham who was the stable jockey at Danebury for several seasons, taking over the role previously occupied by the trainer's brother Alfred.

Day was also closely associated with the Marquess of Hastings, a young aristocrat who had already spent most of a huge inheritance by the time Day trained his filly Lady Elizabeth in 1866. Lady Elizabeth was an outstanding two-year-old, winning twelve of her thirteen races and Hastings backed her with what remained of his fortune to win the 1867 Derby. The filly ran unplaced in the race and Hastings was ruined. Day was accused of knowing that the filly had lost her form, and of misleading Hastings and others as to her condition while wagering heavily against her. When Henry John Rous made allegations about Day's behaviour in a letter to The Times, the trainer responded by bringing an action for libel. The anticipated court case did not materialise as Rous issued a qualified apology.

Following the controversy surrounding Hastings (who died in 1868 at the age of 26), Day's fortunes declined, and he trained few major winners after 1869.

== Family ==
Day's daughter Catherine married Tom Cannon, Sr., who had taken over from Fordham as the stable jockey. Their daughter, Margaret Cannon, was the grandmother of the jockey Lester Piggott. Tom Cannon also acted as the assistant trainer at Danebury and took over the yard when John Day died in 1883.
