= Cossack (horse) =

British-bred Thoroughbred racehorse

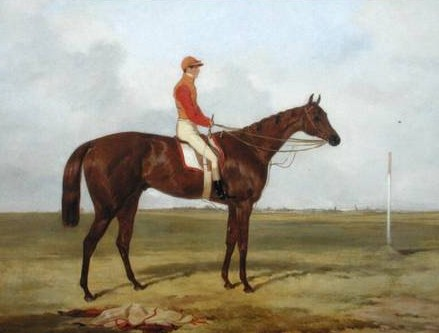
- Cossack with Sim Templeman. Painting by Harry Hall.
- Sire: Hetman Platoff
- Grandsire: Brutandorf
- Dam: Joannina
- Damsire: Priam
- Sex: Stallion
- Foaled: 1844
- Country: United Kingdom of Great Britain and Ireland
- Colour: Chestnut
- Breeder: R. C. Elwes
- Owner: T. H. Pedley
- Trainer: John Day
- Record: 22:3-7-5

Major wins
- Newmarket Stakes (1847); Epsom Derby (1847)

Cossack (1844 – after 1862), also known as "The Cossack", was a British Thoroughbred racehorse and sire. In a career that lasted from July 1846 to June 1849 he ran twenty-two times and won three races. In 1847 he proved himself one of the best British colts of his generation, winning Derby and being narrowly beaten in the St Leger. Although he continued to run well in important staying races for the next five seasons, he failed to win another race and was retired to stud in after running once as an eight-year-old in 1852. No subsequent winner of the Epsom Derby has run beyond the age of five. He was later exported to stand as a stallion in France.

== Background ==
Cossack was a dark chestnut horse standing 15.2 hands high, described by the Farmer's Magazine as having a "neat blood-like head", "clean shoulders" and "very muscular quarters". He was sired by the Northumberland Plate winner Hetman Platoff out of the mare Joannina, a descendant of the influential broodmares Filagree, Web and Penelope.

Cossack was bred at Billing in Northamptonshire by R. C. Elwes. In 1845 the trainer John Day together with a Mr Dilly, visited Elwes stable to view his yearlings. Dilly was unimpressed by the small, upright chestnut but Day thought differently and, after some negotiation, bought him for 200 guineas on behalf of his patron T. H. Pedley, a bookmaker from Huddersfield. Cossack was sent to be trained at Day's stable at Danebury in Hampshire.

== Racing career ==
=== 1846: two-year-old season ===
Cossack performed impressively in trial gallops at Danebury and had built up a considerable reputation before appearing on a racecourse. His first public run in July 1846 at Newmarket when he started favourite for the July Stakes. He ran poorly, however and finished only third to the filly Miami, who went on to win the following year's Epsom Oaks. Cossack did not race again in 1846.

=== 1847: three-year-old season ===
At Newmarket's spring meeting, Cossack started 6/5 favourite and won the Newmarket Stakes, beating War Eagle by a length, with the pair pulling well clear and leaving the other runners in "a cloud of dust". At the same meeting, Cossack's stable companion, Conyngham, won the 2000 Guineas, and John Day found himself the trainer of the two leading Derby contenders.

The Derby was run on 19 May and Cossack started 5/1 second favourite behind Conyngham on 5/2 in a field of thirty-two runners, the largest ever assembled for the race. Even by the usual standards, the crowd was immense, with a "countless multitude" arriving via the newly opened Epsom railway station. After the police had cleared the spectators from the course, the race began with a clean start. Ridden by Sim Templeman, Cossack was second in the early stages, but moved into the lead by half way and soon opened up a clear advantage and was being cheered by the crowd as the likely winner half a mile from the finish. He was still three lengths in front in the straight and the only challenge came from War Eagle who moved almost level in the final furlong before being "shaken off". Cossack won easily by a length from War Eagle, with Van Tromp, who had been badly hampered early in the race, a further four lengths back in third. The value of the race was £5,250. At Royal Ascot in June, Cossack was allowed to walk over for the Swinley Stakes, when the other runners where withdrawn.

At Doncaster in September, Cossack ran in the St Leger. He started favourite at odds of 4/5 despite doubts about his stamina and the fact that Pedley "declared to win" with his other runner, Foreclosure. Templeman attempted to repeat his Epsom tactics and sent Cossack into the lead from the start. By the straight most of his rivals were struggling but Van Tromp, ridden by Job Marson made steady progress and moved alongside the favourite a furlong and a half from the finish. Marson sent his colt past the leader and Templeman, realising he was beaten, eased Cossack down in the closing stages to finish second, two lengths behind the winner but well clear of the rest. On 12 October, Cossack appeared at Newmarket for the two and a quarter-mile Cesarewitch Handicap for which he was set a weight of 118 pounds, including a six-pound weight penalty for finishing second in the St Leger. He finished fourth, behind the four-year-old Cawroush, who was carrying 98 pounds. His performance was creditable and reportedly led to speculation that he could have won the St Leger, had he not been ridden so aggressively.

Cossack's winnings for the season totaled £5,950, making him the second highest earner of the British season behind the Duke of Richmond's Red Hart.

=== 1848: four-year-old season ===
Cossack ran twice without success at Goodwood in July 1848. On the Tuesday of the meeting he faced Van Tromp in a £300 Sweepstakes over three and a half miles. Van Tromp led from the start and Cossack, who was eased down when his chance had gone, was beaten by an estimated 150 yards. Two days later the two colts met yet again in the Goodwood Cup over two and a half miles. Cossack raced prominently in the early part of the race but made no impression in the later stages and finished unplaced and tailed-off behind Van Tromp.

=== 1849: five-year-old season ===
Cossack reappeared as a five-year-old in the two and a quarter-mile Tradesman's Plate at Chester on 2 May. The handicap attracted a field of twenty-nine runners and Cossack was assigned 125 pounds, meaning that he had to concede weight to all but one of his opponents. The race was run at a slow pace and Frank Butler, riding Cossack, found himself trapped behind a "ruck" of horses on the final turn. Butler was forced to pull the horse to the wide outside and Cossack produced a strong finishing run, but failed by a "half neck" to catch Malton, a four-year-old to whom he was conceding thirty-one pounds.

In June Cossack ran twice at Royal Ascot. In the Gold Vase he was involved in a close finish, dead-heating with the filly Canezou for second place, a head behind the winner Glenalvon, after looking the likely winner. A day later, Cossack ran in the Emperor of Russia's Plate, in front of a large crowd which included the Queen and Prince Albert. He finished third, beaten two lengths, behind Van Tromp and Chanticleer, in a race which, according to Bell's Life, created an "extraordinary degree of excitement".

=== 1850: six-year-old season ===
On his six-year-old debut, Cossack again traveled to Chester for the Tradesman's Plate, but on this occasion he finished unplaced under top weight of 128 pounds. At Goodwood on 1 August he finished a well-beaten third of the seven runners behind Canezou in the Goodwood Cup. On 4 September Cossack appeared at Warwick, where he finished fifth, carrying top weight of 120 pounds in the two-mile Leamington Stakes, giving at least twenty-seven pounds to the four horses who finished in front of him.

=== 1851:seven-year-old season ===
In July he ran for the third time in the Goodwood Cup and was narrowly defeated after his strong late run failed by a head against the filly Nancy, who was receiving twenty-four pounds according to weight-for-age rules. After the race Pedley demanded a veterinary examination to determine the filly's true age: she was confirmed to be a three-year-old In August he appeared at Brighton Racecourse where he finished second of the fourteen runners to Lord George in the Brighton Stakes. At Doncaster at the St Leger meeting in September, Cossack ran unplaced under top weight in the Great Yorkshire Handicap and was beaten the following day in a match race by the mare Maid of Masham.

=== 1852:eight-year-old season ===
On 23 June, Cossack, giving at least twenty-six pounds to his opponents, finished third to the three-year-old Stilton in the Northumberland Purse.

== Assessment ==
Cossack's Derby win was seen as a rather fortunate one, owing a great deal to Templeman's enterprising tactics and the interference encountered by Van Tromp, who beat him decisively in all their subsequent meetings. Henry Hall Dixon ("The Druid") described him as "a delightful horse to ride, never pulling and always as ready as a shot".

== Stud career ==
Cossack retired to stand at Stanton, near Shifnal in Shropshire at a fee of 10 guineas for the 1853–1854 season and was sold to Mr. Boythorpe and relocated to Derbyshire in 1855. He stood as a stallion in England until 1857, when he was sold to the French Imperial Stud for 25,000 francs. The best of his offspring was Gamester, a colt who won the St Leger in 1856. Another of his sons, Alcibiade, won the Grand National in 1865.

== Pedigree ==
Pedigree of Cossack (GB), chestnut stallion, 1844
Sire Hetman Platoff (GB) 1836	Brutandorf; 1821	Blacklock	Whitelock
Sire Hetman Platoff (GB) 1836	Brutandorf; 1821	Blacklock	Coriander mare
Sire Hetman Platoff (GB) 1836	Brutandorf; 1821	Mandane	Potoooooooo
Sire Hetman Platoff (GB) 1836	Brutandorf; 1821	Mandane	Young Camilla
Sire Hetman Platoff (GB) 1836	Comus mare 1821	Comus	Sorcerer
Sire Hetman Platoff (GB) 1836	Comus mare 1821	Comus	Houghton Lass
Sire Hetman Platoff (GB) 1836	Comus mare 1821	Marciana	Stamford
Sire Hetman Platoff (GB) 1836	Comus mare 1821	Marciana	Marcia
Dam Joannina (GB) 1835	Priam; 1827	Emilius	Orville
Dam Joannina (GB) 1835	Priam; 1827	Emilius	Emily
Dam Joannina (GB) 1835	Priam; 1827	Cressida	Whiskey
Dam Joannina (GB) 1835	Priam; 1827	Cressida	Young Giantess
Dam Joannina (GB) 1835	Joanna; 1830	Sultan	Selim
Dam Joannina (GB) 1835	Joanna; 1830	Sultan	Bacchante
Dam Joannina (GB) 1835	Joanna; 1830	Filagree	Soothsayer
Dam Joannina (GB) 1835	Joanna; 1830	Filagree	Web (Family:1-s)
