= William Day (horseman) =

British jockey and horse trainer

Personal information
- Born: c. 1823 Hampshire, United Kingdom
- Died: 1908
- Occupation: Trainer

Horse racing career
- Sport: Horse racing

Major racing wins
- British Classic Race wins as trainer: 2000 Guineas (2); Epsom Oaks (1)

Significant horses
- Lord of the Isles, The Promised Land, Brigantine, Foxhall

William Day (c. 1823–1908) was a British jockey and trainer. A member of a large and successful racing family, Day had some success as a jockey before setting up as a trainer at Woodyates, Dorset in 1848. In a training career of over thirty years he sent out the winners of three classics and numerous major handicap races before retiring in the 1880s. His best horse was probably the American colt Foxhall. Day was also a gambler who was involved in scandals and clashes with other racing figures.

== Background ==
Day was one of twelve children of the jockey and trainer John Barham Day, making him the nephew of the jockey Sam Day. William's brothers included John Day, who trained twelve classic winners, and the successful jockeys Samuel and Alfred.

== Riding career ==
Day began his career as a jockey when in his mid-teens, but had limited success at a time when his uncle Sam was the Day family's favoured jockey. When still in his early twenties, Day was involved in a scandal surrounding a horse named Old England, trained by his father and owned by John Gully. Old England was fancied for the 1845 Epsom Derby, but Day wagered heavily against the colt and was involved in a plot to "nobble" (deliberately injure) it at the Danebury stable. Gully discovered the scheme and reported the matter to the Jockey Club. William Day was formally "warned off", meaning that he was indefinitely banned from any involvement from the sport. The ban was eventually revoked.

== Training career ==
In 1847, John Barham Day moved away from Danebury, leaving the stable to his son John. Shortly afterwards, William, having been reinstated by the Jockey Club, set up as a trainer near the village of Woodyates, on the border of Dorset and Wiltshire. In 1852, he trained his first major winner when he sent out Joe Miller to defeat forty-two rivals the Chester Cup, at that time one of the year's most important and valuable races. A month later the same horse won the Gold Cup at Royal Ascot.

In 1855, the Day family appeared to have three of the best three-year-old colts in England: William trained Lord of the Isles for James Merry, his father trained Henry Padwick's St Hubert, while John, Jr.'s classic candidate was a colt named Kingstown. According to one version of events, William and John Sr. came to an arrangement whereby Lord of the Isles would be allowed to win the 2000 Guineas, but would not be trained seriously for the Derby, while the reverse would apply to St Hubert. Lord of the Isles duly gave Day his first classic winner in the Guineas, but when Henry Padwick discovered the arrangement, he sacked John Barham Day, effectively ending his training career. When St Hubert was withdrawn from the Derby, the Day family were forced to rely on Kingstown and Lord of the Isles, despite the fact that the latter had hardly been trained since the Guineas. Both William and John Jr. were strongly suspected of involvement in a series of plots to "nobble" the other leading fancy Wild Dayrell, who nevertheless won the race, with Kingstown second and Lord of the Isles third. Merry removed all his horses from Day's stable, but the Jockey Club on this occasion took no action. In his memoirs, Day denied any wrongdoing, insisting that Lord of the Isles had never been regarded as a Derby horse and only ran at the insistence of the owner. He explained the horse's lack of condition to his contracting a respiratory condition shortly before the race.

Despite controversies, Day continued to have success, both in classic races and handicaps. In 1855 he won the Cambridgeshire Handicap with Sultan and in the following year he added a second Chester Cup with One Act. Four years later, Day won a second classic when he trained his own horse, The Promised Land, to win the 2000 Guineas, ridden by his younger brother Alfred. In 1860, Day's horses completed the Newmarket "Autumn Double" when Dulcibella won the Cesarewitch Handicap and Weatherbound won the Cambridgeshire, with Dulcibella's win reportedly resulting in Day taking £60,000 in successful bets. Around this time, Day had stables at Samways Farm, Alvediston, Wiltshire.

A third Cambridgeshire win with Catch 'em Alive followed in 1863 and in 1869, Day won The Oaks and Ascot Gold Cup with the filly Brigantine. For a time, Day was employed as a private trainer by Brigantine's owners Frederick Johnstone and Henry Sturt. Other important wins in major handicaps included two Stewards' Cups, three Royal Hunt Cups and a Lincolnshire Handicap.

After a relatively quiet period in the 1870s, Day had his last big success with the Kentucky-bred Foxhall who was sent to England in 1880 by his owner James R. Keene. Foxhall was not entered in the classics but established himself as one of the best horses in Europe by beating Tristan in the Grand Prix de Paris in June 1881. Later in the year he won both legs of the Autumn Double. Day was unable to travel to Newmarket to witness the Cambridgeshire, being confined to bed with a broken collarbone, but nevertheless took more than £10,000 in winning bets. The following year, Foxhall won the Ascot Gold Cup but was beaten when odds-on favourite for the Alexandra Plate. The relationship between Day and Keene appears to have broken down at this point, with critical articles appearing in both the British and American press. Keene's horses were removed from Day's stable and sent to Richard Marsh at Newmarket, Suffolk.

== Retirement ==
Foxhall's Gold Cup win was Day's last important success. He left Woodyates to train at his own Cholderton Lodge Estate near Grateley, Hampshire, but retired shortly afterwards and lived at Salisbury till his death in 1908. In retirement, Day turned to writing and produced two volumes of memoirs entitled Reminiscences of the Turf (1886) and Turf Celebrities I Have Known (1891). He also published books on breeding and training racehorses. William's son Alfred Day (not to be confused with his uncle) was a successful trainer, winning races including the Goodwood Cup, Stewards' Cup and Lincolnshire Handicap. He was also one of the founders of Fontwell Racecourse.
