= Chapeau d'Espagne =

British-bred Thoroughbred racehorse

- Sire: Doctor Syntax
- Grandsire: Paynator
- Dam: Chapeau de Paille
- Damsire: Rubens
- Sex: Mare
- Foaled: 1834
- Country: United Kingdom
- Colour: Bay
- Breeder: John Clifton
- Owner: John Barham Day; Lord George Bentinck
- Trainer: John Barham Day
- Record: 22:8-8-2

Major wins
- Criterion Stakes (1836); 1000 Guineas (1837); Salisbury Gold Cup (1838); Devonshire Stakes (1838); Abingdon Cup (1838)

Chapeau d'Espagne (1834 – circa 1858) was a British Thoroughbred racehorse and broodmare who won the classic 1000 Guineas at Newmarket Racecourse in 1837. Chapeau d'Espagne was one of the best two-year-old fillies of 1836, when she won the Criterion Stakes and was placed in both the Molecomb Stakes and the Clearwell Stakes. In the following year she won the 1000 Guineas and finished second in the Oaks Stakes. After failing to win again in 1837 she returned as a four-year-old to win four more races. In all she ran twenty-two times between July 1836 and October 1838, winning eight races. After her retirement from racing she had some success as a broodmare.

== Background ==
Chapeau d'Espagne was a bay mare bred by John Clifton. During the first two years of her racing career she was described as being owned by John Barham Day who trained the filly at Danebury in Hampshire. Lord George Bentinck was registered as owning her from 1838 and may have been her owner throughout her career: the exact details of the ownership of the Danebury horses was somewhat obscure. Chapeau d'Espagne was sired by Doctor Syntax a horse who won thirty-two races most of them over long distances in the north of England. At stud, Doctor Syntax was best known as the sire of the outstanding racemare Beeswing.

According to the New Sporting Magazine Chapeau d'Espagne's name was pronounced Chapeau Despag-ny, by the "jockey boys".

== Racing career ==
=== 1836: two-year-old season ===
Chapeau d'Espagne raced five times as a two-year-old in 1836, winning twice. She made her first appearance at Goodwood Racecourse on 29 July when she finished third of the four runners in the Molecomb Stakes. She did not appear again until the autumn, when she ran four times at Newmarket. At the Second October meeting she finished second, beaten a head by Colonel Peel's unnamed filly in the Clearwell Stakes and was unplaced in the Prendergast Stakes three days later. Two weeks later, she appeared at the Newmarket Houghton meeting, which only went ahead after the course was cleared of snow by a team of a hundred men. The Criterion Stakes was one of only three races possible on the opening day, and Chapeau d'Espagne, ridden by her trainer's brother Samuel Day started at odds of 7/4 against eight opponents. In what was described as a "hammer and tongs" finish, Chapeau d'Espagne won by a head from Fantastic. Three days later the filly won a Sweepstakes over the Abington Mile course, beating two rivals at odds of 1/4.

=== 1837: three-year-old season ===
Chapeau d'Espagne began her three-year-old season with two wins at Newmarket's First Spring meeting. On 25 April she won a Sweepstakes over the Ditch Mile course, beating Mr Batson's filly Voluptuary, with the odds-on favourite Velure, owned by Lord Exeter in third place. Two days later, Chapeau d'Espagne was one of five fillies to contest the 1000 Guineas Stakes over the same course and distance. Ridden by her trainer John Day, she started the 2/5 favourite and won from Velure, with Comate, another of Lord Exeter's fillies in third. A month after her successes at Newmarket, Chapeau d'Espagne was moved up in distance to contest the Oaks Stakes over one and a half miles at Epsom Downs Racecourse. She was made 2/1 favourite in a field of thirteen runners. She finished second to Miss Letty, with Velure in third.

Chapeau d'Espagne's form deteriorated and she failed to win in eight subsequent races in 1837. At Ascot Racecourse in June she finished third to Mango in the Ascot Derby, second to Velure in the Windsor Forest Stakes and then finished unplaced in the Wokingham Stakes. In July at Goodwood she ran four times without success. She finished second in the Drawing-room Stakes, unplaced in the Goodwood Stakes, second in a King's Plate and unplaced in the Waterloo Shield. In August she was sent to Salisbury Racecourse to contest a King's Plate which was run in a series of two mile heats, with the prize going to the first horse to win twice. Chapeau d'Espagne finished third to the gelding Olympic in the first heat and second to the same horse in the second heat.

=== 1838: four-year-old season ===
Chapeau d'Espagne stayed in training as a four-year-old but did not appear in a race until 31 July by which time she had officially entered into the ownership of Lord George Bentinck. At Goodwood she recorded her first success in over a year when she was ridden to victory by John Barham Day in a Sweepstakes over three and three quarter miles. She cantered to the start for the Goodwood Stakes on the following day, but was kicked by another horse before the start and withdrawn from the race. On 16 August, the filly was sent to Salisbury where she finished second to Mr Herbert's six-year-old horse Luck's-all in a King's Plate over three miles. On the following afternoon Chapeau d'Espagne reversed the form with Luck's-all, beating her older rival in the two mile Salisbury Gold Cup. A week after her exploits at Salisbury, Chapeau d'Espagne appeared at the Devon and Exeter meeting where she won the Devonshire Stakes, beating Rattle and King of Clubs. Bentinck's filly was at Weymouth a week later where she finished second to the unusually named three-year-old filly I-wish-you-may-get-it in a King's Plate. Chapeau d'Espagne's last race was at Abingdon on 12 September. In the two and a half mile Abingdon Cup she defeated I-wish-you-may-get-it, carrying nineteen pounds more than her younger rival.

== Stud record ==
Chapeau d'Espagne was retired from racing to become a broodmare at Lord George Bentinck's stud. In 1841 she produced a filly sired by Bay Middleton, named All Round My Hat, who won the Nassau Stakes at Goodwood in 1844. Her other progeny were less successful and she was sold to M. Myslowski in 1847. As a broodmare for Ritter Anton and Myslowski-Koropiec, Chapeau d'Espagne produced five colts and three fillies between 1850 and 1858. There is no breeding record for her after 1858.

== Pedigree ==
Pedigree of Chapeau d'Espagne (GB), bay mare, 1834
Sire Doctor Syntax (GB) 1811	Paynator; 1791	Trumpator	Conductor
Sire Doctor Syntax (GB) 1811	Paynator; 1791	Trumpator	Brunette
Sire Doctor Syntax (GB) 1811	Paynator; 1791	Mark Anthony mare	Mark Anthony
Sire Doctor Syntax (GB) 1811	Paynator; 1791	Mark Anthony mare	Signora
Sire Doctor Syntax (GB) 1811	Beningbrough mare	Beningbrough	King Fergus
Sire Doctor Syntax (GB) 1811	Beningbrough mare	Beningbrough	Fenwick's Herod mare
Sire Doctor Syntax (GB) 1811	Beningbrough mare	Jenny Mole	Carbuncle
Sire Doctor Syntax (GB) 1811	Beningbrough mare	Jenny Mole	Prince Tquassaw mare
Dam Chapeau de Paille (GB) 1821	Rubens; 1805	Buzzard	Woodpecker
Dam Chapeau de Paille (GB) 1821	Rubens; 1805	Buzzard	Misfortune
Dam Chapeau de Paille (GB) 1821	Rubens; 1805	Alexander mare	Alexander
Dam Chapeau de Paille (GB) 1821	Rubens; 1805	Alexander mare	Highflyer mare
Dam Chapeau de Paille (GB) 1821	Fadladinida; 1806	Sir Peter Teazle	Highflyer
Dam Chapeau de Paille (GB) 1821	Fadladinida; 1806	Sir Peter Teazle	Papillon
Dam Chapeau de Paille (GB) 1821	Fadladinida; 1806	Fanny	Diomed
Dam Chapeau de Paille (GB) 1821	Fadladinida; 1806	Fanny	Ambrosia (Family 13)
