= Pyrrhus The First =

British-bred Thoroughbred racehorse

- Pyrrhus The First. Painting by John Frederick Herring Sr.
- Sire: Epirus
- Grandsire: Langar
- Dam: Fortress
- Damsire: Defence
- Sex: Stallion
- Foaled: 1843
- Country: United Kingdom of Great Britain and Ireland
- Colour: Chestnut
- Breeder: Colonel Bouverie
- Owner: John Gully; Mr Harrison
- Trainer: John Day
- Record: 12:10-2-0

Major wins
- Newmarket Stakes (1846); Epsom Derby (1846)

Pyrrhus The First (1843 – 1862) was a British Thoroughbred racehorse and sire. In a career that lasted from April 1846 to 1849 he competed twelve times and won ten races, including one walk-over. In the summer of 1846 he proved himself one of the best British colts of his generation, winning The Derby. After a disappointing year in 1847 he returned to form as a five-year-old and was undefeated in his last seven races. He was retired after winning his only race as a six-year-old and went on to stand as a stallion in England and France.

== Background ==
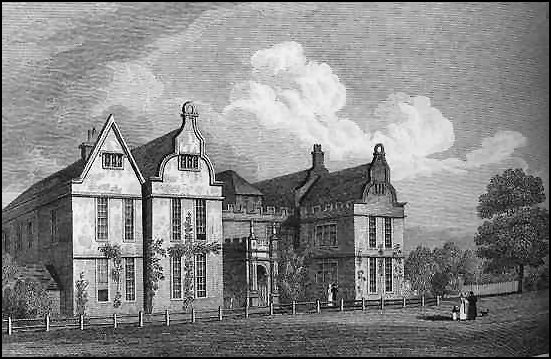
Pyrrhus The First was bred at Delapré Abbey. Etching by J.P. Neale

Pyrrhus The First was a "golden" chestnut horse with a white blaze and white socks on his hind legs, who stood 15.3 hands high. He was bred at Delapre Abbey in Northamptonshire by Colonel Bouverie. Pyrrhus The First was from one of the first crop of foals sired by Epirus, a winner of twelve races, out of Fortress, an unraced mare.

According to one account, Pyrrhus The First was sent to the Doncaster sales where was bought for 300 guineas by the trainer John Day, in a deal which also included his dam, Fortress. Day immediately sold a half share in the colt to his patron John Gully a former prize fighter who later became a Member of Parliament: Day sold the other half share to Gully in 1845. William Day, the trainer's son, writing some years later, gave a different account. According to William, his father bought the foal and mare direct from Bouverie for 250 guineas, and Gully was never more than the part-owner of the horse. John Day trained the colt at his stable at Danebury in Hampshire.

== Racing career ==
=== 1846: three-year-old season ===
Early in 1846, Pyrrhus The First was offered for sale to a Mr Clifton for £500, but Clifton instead purchased his stable companion, Old England. The colt was unraced as a two-year-old and had leg problems that made him difficult to train, leading one report in the Illustrated London News to claim that he took "more walking exercise than any Derby winner on record". He was not seriously tested until April when he impressed Day in a trial gallop. He was then sent to the Newmarket Spring Meeting, where he won the Newmarket Stakes, beating Iago by half a length. Pyrrhus The First then produced another impressive training gallop to establish himself as a leading contender for the Derby.

At Epsom on 27 May, Pyrrhus The First started second favourite for the Derby at odds of 8/1 in a field of twenty-seven runners. Fancy Boy was made 5/1 favourite, while the 2000 Guineas winner, Sir Tatton Sykes started at 10/1. Ridden by his trainer's uncle, the forty-four-year-old Sam Day, Pyrrhus The First was not among the early front-runners, but had moved up to join the leading group on the turn into the straight. Sir Tatton Sykes, who had made up a great deal of ground after being left behind at the start, was sent into the lead by his jockey Bill Scott a furlong from the finish, but Day produced his colt with a strong run in the stretch to overtake the Guineas winner in the last strides and win by a neck, with Brocardo third. Later reports claim that Scott had missed the start because he was drunk and was in no condition to ride a finish, making Sir Tatton Sykes an unlucky loser. The race was the first Derby to be officially timed, with Pyrrhus The First covering the one and a half mile distance in 2:55.0. The result of the race, together with the Classical origins of the winner's name, inspired a poem published in Bentley's Miscellany, ending with the stanza:

"Aloft on circling wing, the feathered heralds spring,

O'er many a town and hamlet, to waft the winner's fame,

How Mr Gully takes as his own the Derby stakes,

And Pyrrhus is the First in fact as well as name."

Pyrrhus The First was withdrawn from the Welcome Stakes at Ascot and did not appear in another competitive race as a three-year-old. He walked over in the Foal Stakes at Winchester Racecourse when no other horses opposed him and in October, his owners paid a forfeit of £100 when he failed to appear for a scheduled match race at level weights against a Grimston, a four-year-old colt who had won the Gold Vase.

=== 1847: four-year-old season ===
Pyrrhus The First was beaten in his only race as a four-year-old, losing a match race at Newmarket in April against The Traverser, one of the colts he had beaten in the Derby. At Newmarket in October he failed to appear for a match race against a three-year-old filly named Bridle.

=== 1848: five-year-old season ===
As a five-year-old, Pyrrhus The First ran in the ownership of a Mr Harrison, although he remained at Day's stable. He was beaten on his debut, when he finished second to Inheritress in the Cheshire Stakes at Chester, but won his remaining six races. He won the Cup at the Bibury Club meeting and then beat the Duke of Richmond's Red Hart (the previous season's leading money winner) by a head in a one-mile Sweepstakes at Goodwood on 29 July. Pyrrhus The First beat Red Hart again in a race for a Queen's Plate at Brighton on 2 August, conceding seven pounds and winning by four lengths. On 16 August he appeared at Egham Racecourse, where he beat Fugleman by four lengths at weight-for-age in another Queen's Plate. At Canterbury on 22 August, he ran a dead-heat with the filly Alpheia in a two-mile Queen's Plate, with The Oaks winner Miami in third, and then won the run-off "in a canter". Pyrrhus The First went on to win a further Queen's Plate at Lewes Racecourse, beating Miami again.

=== 1849: six-year-old season ===
On his only appearance as a six-year-old, Pyrrhus The First won the Lansdowne Trial Stakes at the Somerset County Meeting and was then retired to stud.

== Stud career ==
Pyrrhus The First retired to Harrison's stud at Easby Abbey in Yorkshire, where he stood at a fee of 10 guineas and was advertised as "the best untried stallion of the present day". In 1851 he was moved to stand at Willesden Paddocks where he replaced The Libel. His most successful achievement as a stallion was to sire Virago who won the 1000 Guineas in 1854 and went on to defeat colts and older horses in the Goodwood Cup, Doncaster Cup, City and Suburban Handicap and Great Metropolitan Handicap. Pyrrhus The First was later sold and exported to stand as a stallion in France, where in 1859, he was reported to be "in great favour" and covering at a fee of £20. Pyrrhus The First died in 1862.

== Sire line tree ==
- Pyrrhus the First
  - King Alfred
  - New Warrior
    - Tarragon
      - A.T.
    - Deerfoot
    - Tim Whiffler
      - Tim Whiffler
        - Voltiguer
    - Warrior
    - Cour De Lion
      - Larpent
    - Idle Boy
    - The Pearl
    - The Prophet
  - Magus
    - Rioter
  - Snowden
    - Swiveller
      - Mentor
    - Suwarrow
  - Mouravieff
  - Ringer

== Pedigree ==
Pedigree of Pyrrhus The First (GB), chestnut stallion, 1843
Sire Epirus (GB) 1834	Langar; 1817	Selim	Buzzard
Sire Epirus (GB) 1834	Langar; 1817	Selim	Alexander mare
Sire Epirus (GB) 1834	Langar; 1817	Walton mare	Walton
Sire Epirus (GB) 1834	Langar; 1817	Walton mare	Young Giantess
Sire Epirus (GB) 1834	Olympia; 1815	Sir Oliver	Sir Peter Teazle
Sire Epirus (GB) 1834	Olympia; 1815	Sir Oliver	Fanny
Sire Epirus (GB) 1834	Olympia; 1815	Scotilla	Anvil
Sire Epirus (GB) 1834	Olympia; 1815	Scotilla	Scota
Dam Fortress (GB) 1836	Defence; 1824	Whalebone	Waxy
Dam Fortress (GB) 1836	Defence; 1824	Whalebone	Penelope
Dam Fortress (GB) 1836	Defence; 1824	Defiance	Rubens
Dam Fortress (GB) 1836	Defence; 1824	Defiance	Little Folly
Dam Fortress (GB) 1836	Jewess; 1827	Moses	Seymour
Dam Fortress (GB) 1836	Jewess; 1827	Moses	Gohanna mare
Dam Fortress (GB) 1836	Jewess; 1827	Calendulae	Camerton
Dam Fortress (GB) 1836	Jewess; 1827	Calendulae	Snowdrop (Family:3-a)
