= Lindsay Charnock =

English jockey

Personal information
- Nationality: English
- Born: 1955
- Died: 2015 (aged 59–60)

Lindsay Charnock (1955 – 2015) was an English jockey who competed in flat racing. Charnock's career lasted more than 30 years until his retirement in 1999 due to circulation problems, which later led to partial amputation of his right leg. He rode over 800 winners during his career, which took place mainly in the north of England, and due to his light weight he had particular success in handicap races. Amongst his major victories were two wins in the Cesarewitch Handicap, in 1995 and 1997. His only win in a group race came in his final season when Jemima won the Lowther Stakes at York Racecourse. Charnock died suddenly in August 2015.
