= Problem (horse) =

British Thoroughbred racehorse

- Sire: Merlin
- Grandsire: Castrel
- Dam: Pawn
- Damsire: Trumpator
- Sex: Mare
- Foaled: 1823
- Country: United Kingdom
- Colour: Chestnut
- Breeder: George FitzRoy, 4th Duke of Grafton
- Owner: Duke of Grafton
- Trainer: Robert Robson
- Record: 8:3-2-1

Major wins
- 1000 Guineas (1826); Match against Reformer (1827); Match against The Dragon (1827)

Problem (foaled 1823) was a British Thoroughbred racehorse and broodmare who won the classic 1000 Guineas at Newmarket in 1826. After winning the classic on her first appearance on a racecourse, Problem was beaten on her next five starts before returning to form to win two match races at Newmarket 1827. After her retirement, Problem became a successful and influential broodmare.

== Background ==
Problem was a chestnut mare bred by her owner George FitzRoy, 4th Duke of Grafton at his stud at Euston Hall in Suffolk. She was sired by Merlin, a horse with a "frightful temper" whose wins included the Port Stakes at Newmarket in 1819. At stud, his best runner apart from Problem was her contemporary and stable companion Dervise who won the 2000 Guineas for the Duke of Grafton in 1826. Problem's dam Pawn was a daughter of Prunella, described as one of the most important broodmares in the history of the Thoroughbred breed. Pawn herself was an influential broodmare, regarded as the Foundation mare of Thoroughbred Family 1-f. Her direct descendants have won hundreds of major races in the last two centuries and include the modern champions Hurricane Run, Snow Fairy and Frankel. Grafton sent the filly to be trained at Newmarket by Robert Robson, the so-called "Emperor of Trainers".

== Racing career ==
=== 1826: three-year-old season ===
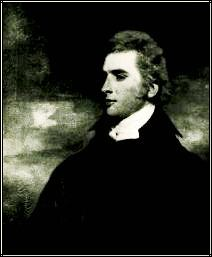
The Duke of Grafton, who bred and owned Problem

Problem did not race before contesting the 1000 Guineas Stakes on 28 April 1826. She was ridden by John Barham Day and started at odds of 5/1 in a field of six fillies for the race over the Ditch Mile course. She won the race from Tears, a filly owned by the Duke of Grafton's cousin Thomas Grosvenor, with the odds on favourite Butterfly in third place. Problem's win was the seventh in the race for the Duke of Grafton and an eighth for Robert Robson. A month after her win in the Guineas Problem was sent to Epsom Downs Racecourse for the Oaks Stakes over one and a half miles. The race attracted a field of fifteen runners and Problem was made favourite at 6/4, with Tears being the second choice of the betters at 6/1. She went into the lead from the start and still held the advantage on the turn into the straight. In the closing stages she turned back challenges from Butterfly and Shortwaist but was overtaken inside the final furlong and finished second to Lilias, a 15/1 outsider owned and trained by John "Daddy" Forth.

After her defeat at Epsom Problem was off the course for more than four months before reappearing at Newmarket's First October meeting. She started 7/4 favourite for the ten furlong Grand Duke Michael Stakes but finished unplaced behind Lord Exeter's colt Hobgoblin. Two days later Problem again raced against colts in the Newmarket St Leger over the two mile "Ditch In" course and finished unplaced behind the dead-heaters Leeway and Monarch. Her final race of the year came in the Frogmore Stakes at the Second October meeting. She started the 1/2 favourite but was beaten by her only rival, the Duke of York's filly Elizabeth, who won by a head.

=== 1827: four-year-old season ===
Problem began her 1827 season at the Craven meeting at Newmarket in April. In the Claret Stakes for four-year-olds over two miles she finished third of the four runners behind her stable companion and close relative Dervise (apart from being sired by the same stallion, Dervise was the son of Problem's half-sister, Pawn Junior). At the Second Spring meeting in May Problem was withdrawn from an engagement is a Handicap Sweepstakes but took part in a match race over the Ditch Mile two days later. Her opponent was Lord Wharncliffe's six-year-old chestnut horse Reformer who was given a weight of 122 pounds, 11 more than the filly. Problem easily defeated her older rival to record her first win in over a year and claim a prize of 200 guineas.

In October Problem took part in a second match race over the Ditch Mile. On this occasion she was required to carry six pounds more than her opponent The Dragon, a colt owned by Lord Jersey. The Dragon was strongly favoured in the betting but Problem, ridden by Francis Buckle, prevailed to win a further 200 guineas.

== Stud record ==
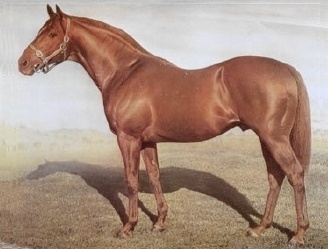
Star Kingdom, one of Problem's many successful descendants

Problem was retired to become a broodmare at the Duke of Grafton's stud. She produced no champions but the successes of two of her daughters ensured that she had a lasting impact on the history of the Thoroughbred and she is regarded as the Foundation mare of Thoroughbred Family 1-g. In 1831 she produced the filly Nameless, sired by Emilius, whose descendants include the British classic winners Pilgrimage, Swynford and Mon Fils. Swynford became a champion sire as did another of Nameless's descendants, the British-bred, Australian-based Star Kingdom. Problem's 1836 foal was Io, a chestnut filly sired by Taurus. Io is the ancestor of numerous leading Thoroughbreds including the Triple Crown winner Gay Crusader. Other descendants of Io are Dayjur, Sky Beauty and Summing.

== Pedigree ==
Pedigree of Problem (GB), chestnut mare, 1823
Sire Merlin (GB) 1815	Castrel; 1801	Buzzard	Woodpecker*
Sire Merlin (GB) 1815	Castrel; 1801	Buzzard	Misfortune
Sire Merlin (GB) 1815	Castrel; 1801	Alexander mare	Alexander
Sire Merlin (GB) 1815	Castrel; 1801	Alexander mare	Highflyer mare*
Sire Merlin (GB) 1815	Miss Newton; 1804	Delpini	Highflyer*
Sire Merlin (GB) 1815	Miss Newton; 1804	Delpini	Countess
Sire Merlin (GB) 1815	Miss Newton; 1804	Tipple Cyder	King Fergus
Sire Merlin (GB) 1815	Miss Newton; 1804	Tipple Cyder	Sylvia
Dam Pawn (GB) 1808	Trumpator; 1782	Conductor	Matchem
Dam Pawn (GB) 1808	Trumpator; 1782	Conductor	Snap mare*
Dam Pawn (GB) 1808	Trumpator; 1782	Brunette	Squirrel
Dam Pawn (GB) 1808	Trumpator; 1782	Brunette	Dove
Dam Pawn (GB) 1808	Prunella; 1788	Highflyer*	Herod*
Dam Pawn (GB) 1808	Prunella; 1788	Highflyer*	Rachel
Dam Pawn (GB) 1808	Prunella; 1788	Promise	Snap*
Dam Pawn (GB) 1808	Prunella; 1788	Promise	Julia (Family 1-f)

* Problem is inbred 5S x 4S x 3D to the stallion Highflyer, meaning that he appears fifth generation (via Highflyer mare) and fourth generation on the sire side of her pedigree, and third generation on the dam side of her pedigree.

* Problem is inbred 5S x 6S x 5S x 4D to the stallion Herod, meaning that he appears fifth generation (via Woodpecker), sixth generation (via Highflyer mare) and fifth generation (via Highflyer) on the sire side of her pedigree, and fourth generation on the dam side of her pedigree.

* Problem is inbred 5D x 4D to the stallion Snap, meaning that he appears fifth generation (via Snap mare) and fourth generation on the dam side of her pedigree.
