= Andover (horse) =

British-bred Thoroughbred racehorse

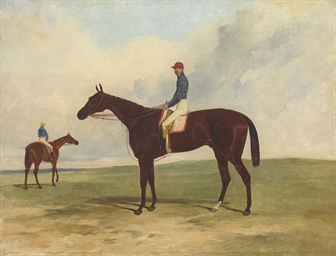
- Andover and Alfred Day. Painting by Harry Hall.
- Sire: Bay Middleton
- Grandsire: Sultan
- Dam: Defence mare
- Damsire: Defence
- Sex: Stallion
- Foaled: 1851
- Country: United Kingdom of Great Britain and Ireland
- Colour: Brown
- Breeder: W. Etwall
- Owner: John Gully
- Trainer: John Day
- Record: 10:8-0-1

Major wins
- Molecomb Stakes (1853); Epsom Derby (1854)

Andover (1851 – after 1865) was a British Thoroughbred racehorse and sire. In a career that lasted from July 1853 to September 1854 he ran ten times and won eight races. After being beaten in his first racecourse appearance he won his next seven races including the 1854 Epsom Derby. Andover was retired to stud at the end of his three-year-old season. After less than two years as a stallion in England he was sold and exported to Russia.

== Background ==
Andover was a strongly built bay horse with one white foot, standing 15.2 hands high. He was bred by William Etwall, of Longstock near the Hampshire town of Andover, after which the colt was named. He was sired by Bay Middleton, an unbeaten champion racehorse who won the 2000 Guineas and the Derby in 1836. He was also a highly successful stallion being Leading sire in Great Britain and Ireland in 1844 and 1849 and siring the Derby and St Leger winner The Flying Dutchman. Andover's dam (sometimes referred to as the sister to Aegis) was an unnamed mare by Defence, who went on to produce Anton, a colt who finished second in the 2000 Guineas and won the St. James's Palace Stakes.

Andover was offered for sale as a yearling and was bought by the former prize-fighter John Gully who owned the colt in partnership with Henry Padwick (also known as Mr Howard). Andover was sent into training with John Day at Danebury in Hampshire and ridden in most of his races by Alfred Day, his trainer's younger brother.

== Racing career ==
=== 1853: two-year-old season ===
Andover's racing career began in July at Goodwood, where he ran twice. He finished third to Alembic in the Ham Stakes on his debut and then won the Molecomb Stakes by a length and a half from the future Epsom Oaks winner Mincemeat. He made two more appearances at Brighton in August, walking over in a £175 Sweepstakes when no other horses appeared to oppose him and then completing his hat-trick by winning a £100 Plate. In the latter race he carried top weight of 123 pounds and won by a head from Quince. He was to have been aimed at the Criterion Stakes, a valuable race at Newmarket in October, but sustained an injury which kept him off the racecourse for the remainder of the season.

Andover's winning prize money of £810 made him only the twelfth highest earning two-year-old of the season, but some considered him a serious contender for the following year's Derby.

=== 1854: three-year-old season ===
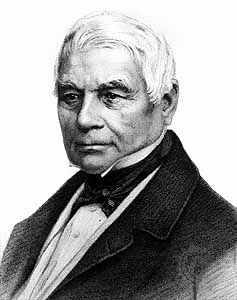
John Gully: Andover's owner was a former boxing champion who became an M.P.

Andover made his first appearance as a three-year-old in the Derby on 31 May. In a field of twenty-seven runners he started 7/2 second favourite for the £5,950 prize. Ridden by Alfred Day, he was held up in the early stages before making steady progress and turning into the straight in third place behind the 2000 Guineas winner The Hermit and the 5/2 favourite Dervish. Inside the final quarter mile the two leaders began to weaken, and Day sent Andover into the lead. He held off the strong late challenge of King Tom to win by a length in a time of 2:52.0

After the Derby, Andover developed a "curb" or swelling of the hock but he nevertheless appeared at his local course at Stockbridge for a Triennial Stakes on 29 June. He started at odds of 2/7 and won by a length from a good colt named Ivan, to whom he was conceding ten pounds. In July he walked over for a £125 race at Goodwood and then returned to Brighton where he won the Champagne Stakes by a length from two opponents at odds of 1/20.

In autumn Andover was sent to Doncaster, although he had not been entered for the St Leger. His seven-race winning streak came to an end in the Eglington Stakes on 14 September, in which he was set to carry top weight of 131 pounds over a distance of a mile. Before the race he looked impressive but "a little too fat" and in the race itself he finished fourth, beaten three lengths by a two-year-old colt named The Chicken. The winner was later renamed Vengeance and won the Cesarewitch Handicap in 1856. On the following day Andover returned to his best form to win the Don Stakes by a neck from Gospodar. Andover seems to have been kept in training as a four-year-old as he appeared among the entries for the Chester Cup, but he never ran again.

== Stud career ==
At the end of his racing career, Andover was bought for £1,450 by the leading breeder Sir Tatton Sykes and stood as a stallion at his Sledmere Stud in Yorkshire. Before any of his offspring appeared on a racecourse, Andover was sold for £2,000 and exported to Russia in 1856.

== Sire line tree ==
- Andover
  - Craymond
    - Harmonium
    - Post Haste
  - Walkington

== Pedigree ==
Pedigree of Andover (GB), bay stallion, 1851
Sire Bay Middleton (GB) 1833	Sultan; 1816	Selim	Buzzard
Sire Bay Middleton (GB) 1833	Sultan; 1816	Selim	Alexander mare
Sire Bay Middleton (GB) 1833	Sultan; 1816	Bacchante	Williamson's Ditto
Sire Bay Middleton (GB) 1833	Sultan; 1816	Bacchante	Mercury mare
Sire Bay Middleton (GB) 1833	Cobweb; 1821	Phantom	Walton
Sire Bay Middleton (GB) 1833	Cobweb; 1821	Phantom	Julia
Sire Bay Middleton (GB) 1833	Cobweb; 1821	Filagree	Soothsayer
Sire Bay Middleton (GB) 1833	Cobweb; 1821	Filagree	Web
Dam Defence mare (GB) 1844	Defence; 1824	Whalebone	Waxy
Dam Defence mare (GB) 1844	Defence; 1824	Whalebone	Penelope
Dam Defence mare (GB) 1844	Defence; 1824	Defiance	Rubens
Dam Defence mare (GB) 1844	Defence; 1824	Defiance	Little Folly
Dam Defence mare (GB) 1844	Soldier's Joy; 1836	The Colonel	Whisker
Dam Defence mare (GB) 1844	Soldier's Joy; 1836	The Colonel	Delpini mare
Dam Defence mare (GB) 1844	Soldier's Joy; 1836	Galatea	Amadis
Dam Defence mare (GB) 1844	Soldier's Joy; 1836	Galatea	Paulina (Family:8-e)
