= Danebury Hill =

UK Site of Special Scientific Interest

Coordinates: 51.138°N 1.537°W

- Site of Special Scientific Interest
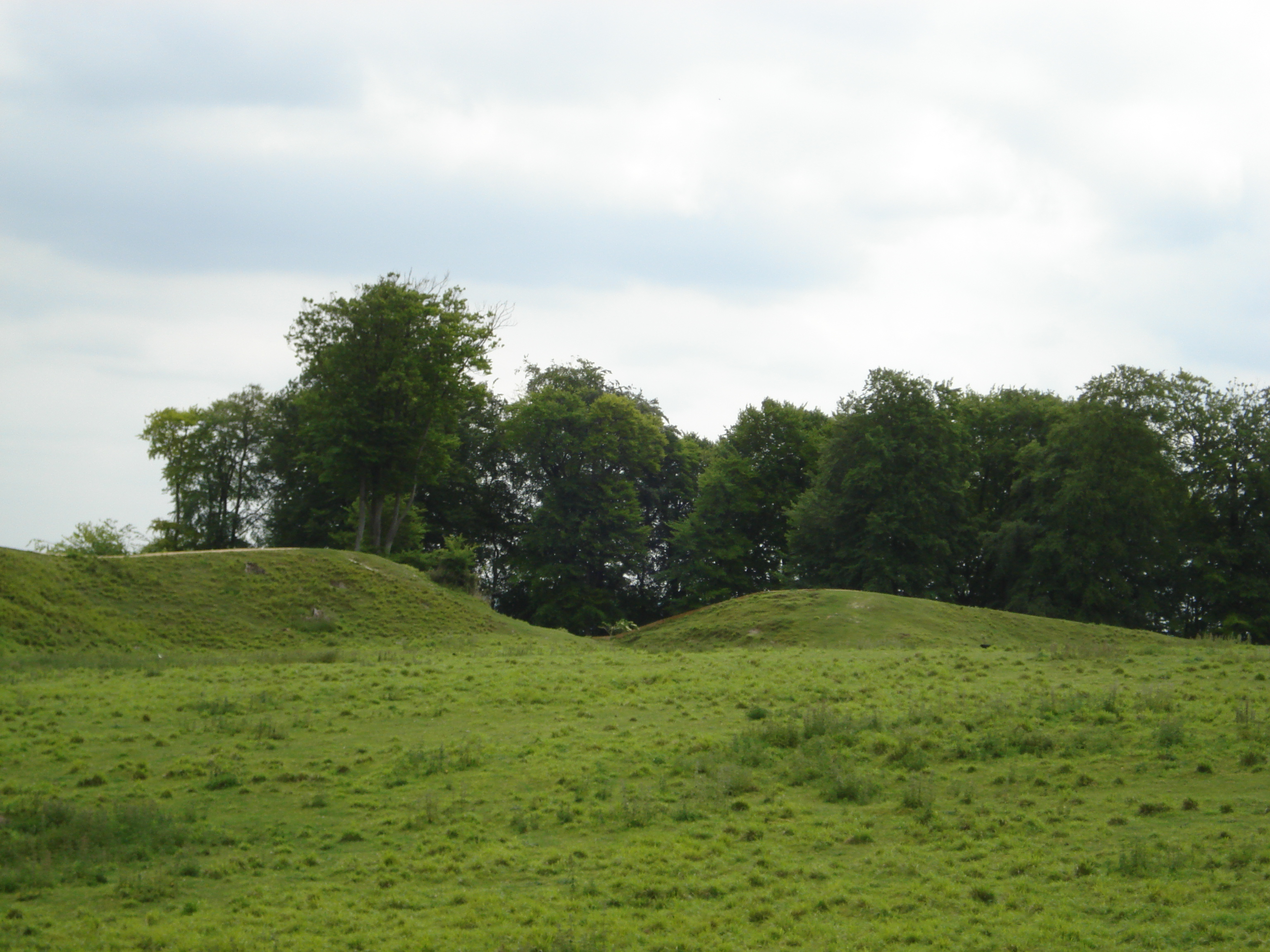
- Location of Danebury Hill.
- Area of search: Hampshire
- Grid reference: SU 325 377
- Interest: Biological
- Area: 13.7 hectares (34 acres)
- Notification date: 1984
- Location map: Magic Map

Danebury Hill is a 13.7-hectare (34-acre) biological Site of Special Scientific Interest north-east of Nether Wallop in Hampshire. It is part of Danebury Hillfort Local Nature Reserve.

This gently sloping site surrounds Danebury, which is a hill fort dating to the Iron Age. It has herb-rich chalk grassland which is grazed by rabbits and sheep, and there are also areas of mixed and juniper scrub. Flowering plants include the scarce burnt-tip orchid, field fleawort and frog orchid.
