= Henry Padwick =

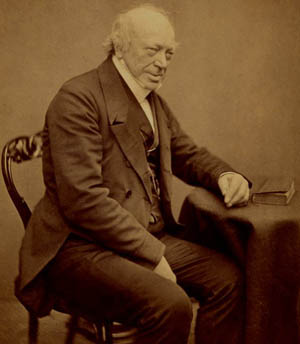
Henry Padwick

Henry Padwick (1805–1879) was an English solicitor and figure of the horse racing world, known also as a moneylender, gambler and speculator.

== Life ==
He was the son of William Padwick (died 1834) of Cosham House, Hampshire. He retired from the legal profession in 1855. He became a magistrate in Middlesex and Deputy-Keeper of Holyrood Palace.

As a solicitor in Horsham, Padwick was involved as electoral agent to William Vesey-FitzGerald in canvassing, the subject of an electoral corruption case for an 1848 by-election for Horsham. In the 1857 general election Padwick stood unsuccessfully as a Conservative candidate at Bridgwater.

== Racing ==
Padwick employed the trainer John Barham Day from 1845 to 1855, when he was sacked after a scandal involving the Two Thousand Guineas. From 1849 Padwick used "Mr. Howard" as his nom de course. In 1854 he won £80,000 on his horse Virago, losing the sum in stock market speculation. In 1854, also, Padwick was co-owner with John Gully of Andover, winner of the Epsom Derby.

In the aftermath of the 1855 departure from the United Kingdom of the Member of Parliament Francis Child Villiers, known as Frank, Padwick became involved in trying to clear up his heavy unpaid betting debts. To this end he was an adviser to George Child Villiers, 5th Earl of Jersey, Frank's father, and worked with Benjamin Disraeli.

In the 1868 Derby, won by Blue Gown, after the favourite Lady Elizabeth owned by the 4th Marquess of Hastings performed badly, Padwick and the bookmaker Harry Hill were implicated in the scratching from the race of the Marquess's other horse, The Earl. The Marquess owed Padwick money.

== Family ==
Padwick married in 1825 Susan Chasemore, daughter of Philip Chasemore of Horsham. They had one son, Henry.
