= Canezou =

The Canezou (a.k.a. Canezou-fichu), c. 1835, is a type of clothing, generally worn alongside a corsage.

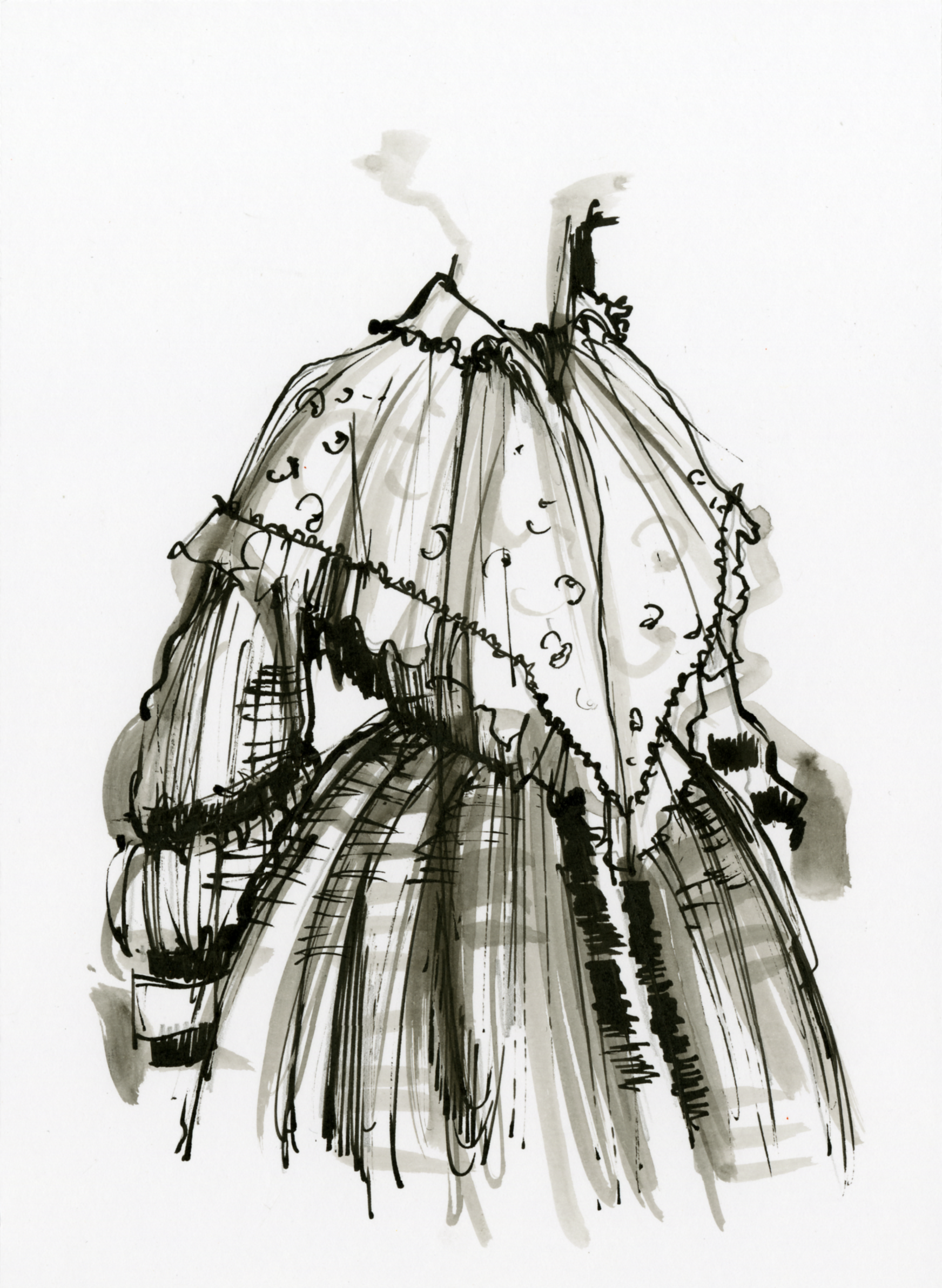
Canezou

Canezous were originally short jackets similar to spencers. Over time, they evolved into a sleeveless, sideless form, which was called a "fichu-canezou." It was almost always tucked into a belt, and was made of white material.

The name "Canezou", is a corruption of the French term "Quinze Août" meaning 15 August. According to Victor Hugo, in his work Les Misérables, this "signifies good weather, heat and noon".

In 1852, the canezou appeared to take the place of dainty lace and embroidered capes. This type of clothing allowed there to be "a happy medium between high and low corsages".

In The Royal Lady's Magazine, there are various references to the canezou: "The corsage for morning dress is generally made plain, and over it the light and elegant canezou is seen, in numberless varieties of form and texture, at once rich and graceful...An elegant canezou of moiree, colour, the evening primrose, and edged with a rich silk fringe is worn with this dress. Colerette of tulle, interspersed with rays of gauze ribbon, the same colour as the canezou."

In Godey's magazine, Volume 2, the canezou is described thus: "...over the coursage is worn an elegantly worked muslin canezou, with double joke, falling very low over the sleeves; on each shoulder is placed a bow of gauze riband, similar in colour and pattern to that which trims the cap; gold bracelets, worked in the oriental style"

In Harper's Magazine, Volume 15, the canezou is describes in the following way: "This very pretty outdoor dress for a young lady, is composed of tarletan, with a canezou of black tulle gathered upon black satin bands and edged with double lace. The sleeves are large and puffed, and are caught up with a naud of black satin ribbon"
