= Foxhall (horse) =

American-bred Thoroughbred racehorse

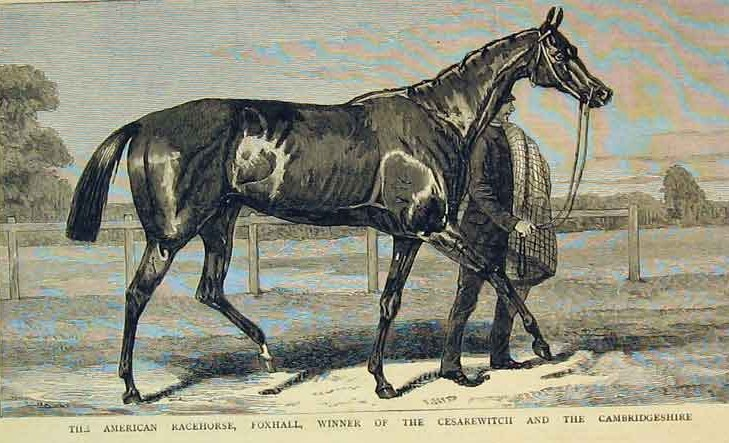
- Sire: King Alfonso
- Grandsire: Phaeton
- Dam: Jamaica
- Damsire: Lexington
- Sex: Stallion
- Foaled: April 2, 1877
- Country: United States
- Colour: Bay
- Breeder: Woodburn Stud
- Owner: James R. Keene
- Trainer: William Day
- Record: 11:7-3-0
- Earnings: £

Major wins
- Grand Prix de Paris (1881); Cesarewitch Handicap (1881); Cambridgeshire Stakes (1881); Ascot Gold Cup (1882)

Foxhall (1879–1904) was an American-bred Thoroughbred racehorse and sire. He was trained in Britain during a racing career that lasted from 1880 until June 1882 during which he ran eleven times and won seven races. As a three-year-old in 1881, he proved himself to be the outstanding colt of the season in Europe, winning the Grand Prix de Paris and becoming the second of only three horses to complete the Autumn Double of the Cesarewitch and the Cambridgeshire.

== Background ==
Foxhall was bred by the Alexander family at the Woodburn Stud in Kentucky. He was bought as a yearling by James R. Keene, who named the colt after his son. His sire was King Alfonso, a leading American stallion who got the Kentucky Derby winners Fonso and Joe Cotton.

In March 1880 Keene sent thirteen horses by transatlantic steamer to be trained in England. These included Lord Murphy and Spendthrift as well as eleven Kentucky-bred two-year-olds. In England, Foxhall was trained by William Day near Woodyates on the border of Dorset and Wiltshire.

== Racing career ==
=== 1880: two-year-old season ===
Foxhall ran three times as a two-year-old in England. He won the Bedford Stakes at Newmarket and finished second to Savoyard in the Ashley Stakes. In late October at the Newmarket Houghton meeting he carried top weight of 124 pounds in the Bretby Nursery Handicap. Ridden by Charles Wood, he won by a head from the favourite Heyday, to whom he was conceding 28 pounds.

=== 1881: three-year-old season ===
Foxhall was not entered in the Classics or any of the major weight-for-age races in England. He was therefore aimed at the major handicap prizes, beginning with the City and Suburban Handicap at Epsom on 27 April. Carrying 91 pounds he finished second of the twenty-four runners, beaten one and a half lengths by the 1880 Epsom Derby winner Bend Or. His performance prompted the Daily Telegraph to express the opinion that Foxhall was the best three-year-old seen in public that year.

On 12 June, Foxhall was sent to France for the Grand Prix de Paris at Longchamp where he was ridden by George Fordham and started at odds of 2/1 for the 3000m race. Foxhall went to the front from the start and led into the straight where he repelled the persistent challenge of the English colt Tristan (ridden by Fred Archer) to win by a head. The American contingent in the crowd responded to the Foxhall's victory by going "mad with excitement", greeting the winner with tremendous applause and much waving of the Stars and Stripes. The French crowd treated the defeat of Tristan as a home victory and joined in the celebrations which were described as "the wildest ever seen at Longchamp". It was only after the intervention of the local police force that Fordham and Archer were able to return to the weighing room. Keene was reported as saying that he was glad for "American breeding and American horses." Foxhall's trainer, William Day, who was confined to bed in England with a broken collarbone, reportedly won more than £10,000 in bets on the race. Three days later, Foxhall was back in England for the Gold Cup over two and a half miles at Royal Ascot. He finished fourth of the five runners behind Robert the Devil.

In late September, Foxhall won the Grand Duke Michael Stakes and was then entered in the two great handicap races at Newmarket. The first of these was the Czarewitch Stakes over two and a quarter miles, on 11 October in which Foxhall carried 110 pounds. The race was run in a slight drizzle and Foxhall, was held up in the early stages. He was moved up to contest the lead half a mile from the finish and was soon clear of his rivals, winning by ten lengths from Chippendale with Fiddler third. Three days later he took on Tristan in the Select Stakes over one mile and won “in a canter” by three quarters of a length. His win in the Czarewitch meant that Foxhall had to carry a penalty of fourteen pounds for the Cambridgeshire, taking his total weight up to 126 pounds. He started at odds of 10/1 in a field of thirty-two runners which included Bend Or and Tristan. In a closely fought finish, Foxhall, ridden by John Watts won by a head from the filly Lucy Glitters (91 pounds) with Tristan (107) third, setting a weight-carrying record for a horse of any age. A $30,000 match race between Foxhall and Iroquois at Chicago Driving Park was proposed, but did not materialise, although Keene said that he would be happy to take on Iroquois over any distance and considered Foxhall the best three-year-old in the world.

=== 1882: four-year-old season ===
Foxhall did not appear as a four-year-old until 8 June when contested the Gold Cup at Royal Ascot over two and a half miles. He started the 4/9 favourite, with only two horses opposing him; the 2000 Guineas winner Petronel and the three-year-old Faugh-a-Ballagh. Foxhall had to be ridden out by Tom Cannon to win by a neck from Faugh-a-Ballagh. On the following day, Foxhall again started 4/9 favourite, this time for the three mile Alexandra Plate but finished second to Fiddler. He was virtually pulled up in the closing stages and finished the race “very distressed”

The relationship between Foxhall's owner and trainer appear to have broken down at this point, with critical articles appearing in both the British and American press. and in November 1882, Keene offered Foxhall for sale with a price of $35,000. The sale offer was later withdrawn, but Foxhall, together with Keene's other British-trained horses, were removed from Day's stable and sent to Richard Marsh at Newmarket, Suffolk.

Although Foxhall remained in training with Marsh in 1883 and was entered in several important races he did not appear on the racecourse. He was put on sale again in the autumn of the year.

== Assessment ==
In the autumn of 1881 Foxhall was rated “the best horse at present on the English Turf”. At around the same time, The Sportsman described him as the best three-year-old of the season.

In May 1886 The Sporting Times carried out a poll of one hundred racing experts to create a ranking of the best British racehorses of the 19th century. Foxhall was ranked twelfth, having been placed in the top ten by twenty-seven of the contributors. William Day regarded Foxhall as the best horse he had ever trained and his win in the Cambridgeshire as "the most marvellous performance on record."

== Stud career ==
Foxhall was not a very successful stallion. The best of his offspring was the filly Cortsorphine who won the Dewhurst Stakes in 1890 and finished second in The Oaks the following year. Foxhall died in 1904 at Lord Roseberry's stud farm.

== Pedigree ==
Pedigree of Foxhall (USA), bay stallion, 1878
Sire King Alfonso (USA) 1872	Phaeton; 1865	King Tom	Harkaway
Sire King Alfonso (USA) 1872	Phaeton; 1865	King Tom	Pocahontas*
Sire King Alfonso (USA) 1872	Phaeton; 1865	Merry Sunshine	Storm
Sire King Alfonso (USA) 1872	Phaeton; 1865	Merry Sunshine	Falstaff mare
Sire King Alfonso (USA) 1872	Capitola; 1858	Vandal*	Glencoe*
Sire King Alfonso (USA) 1872	Capitola; 1858	Vandal*	Tranby mare*
Sire King Alfonso (USA) 1872	Capitola; 1858	Margrave mare	Margrave*
Sire King Alfonso (USA) 1872	Capitola; 1858	Margrave mare	Mistletoe
Dam Jamaica (USA) 1871	Lexington; 1850	Boston	Timoleon
Dam Jamaica (USA) 1871	Lexington; 1850	Boston	sister to Tuckahoe
Dam Jamaica (USA) 1871	Lexington; 1850	Alice Carneal	Sarpedon
Dam Jamaica (USA) 1871	Lexington; 1850	Alice Carneal	Rowena
Dam Jamaica (USA) 1871	Fanny Ludlow; 1865	Eclipse	Orlando
Dam Jamaica (USA) 1871	Fanny Ludlow; 1865	Eclipse	Gaze
Dam Jamaica (USA) 1871	Fanny Ludlow; 1865	Mollie Jackson	Vandal*
Dam Jamaica (USA) 1871	Fanny Ludlow; 1865	Mollie Jackson	Emma Wright* (Family: 21)

* Foxhall is inbred 3S x 4D to the stallion Vandal, meaning that he appears third generation on the sire side of his pedigree, and fourth generation on the dam side of his pedigree.

* Foxhall is inbred 5S x 4S x 5D to the stallion Glencoe, meaning that he appears fifth generation (via Pocahontas) and fourth generation on the sire side of his pedigree, and fifth generation (via Vandal) on the dam side of his pedigree.

* Foxhall is inbred 4S x 5D to the stallion Margrave, meaning that he appears fourth generation on the sire side of his pedigree, and fifth generation (via Emma Wright) on the dam side of his pedigree.
