= John Gully =

British boxer and politician (1783–1863)

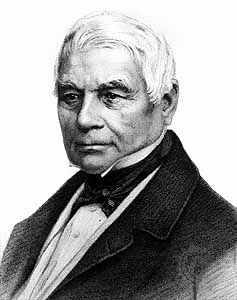
John Gully, 1860

John Gully (21 August 1783 – 9 March 1863) was an English champion prizefighter who became a racehorse owner and, from 1832 to 1837, a Member of Parliament.

== Early life ==
Gully was born at Wick, near Bath, the son of an innkeeper who became a butcher in Bath shortly after John's birth. Gully worked for his father and inherited the business on his father's death. In 1805, the business failed and as a result, Gully was imprisoned for debt.

== Boxing ==
Gully was visited in prison by a friend, Hen Pearce, a well-known prizefighter who was nicknamed "the Game Chicken" in bare-knuckle boxing circles. An informal match was arranged between them, which took place in the prison; as a result, Gully's debts were settled. On 8 October 1805, Gully was again matched against Pearce in a fight watched by the Duke of Clarence (later William IV of the United Kingdom) and numerous other spectators. After fighting twenty eight rounds, taking an hour and seventeen minutes, Gully was beaten. In 1807, he twice fought Bob Gregson, the "Lancashire Giant", for two hundred guineas a side, winning on both occasions. The foremost prizefighting reporter of the period, Pierce Egan, recorded their battle of 14 October 1807:

‘Gregson’s strength was manifest to his opponent, who endeavoured to ward off its potent effects by his thorough knowledge of the science, and Gulley put in another dreadful facer, which made the claret fly in all directions, when Gregson fell' (Boxiana, vol. I).

== Horse racing ==
Gully became the landlord of the Plough Tavern in Carey Street, London. He retired from the ring in 1808, and took to horse-racing. In 1827 he lost £40,000 by backing his horse Mameluke (for which he had paid four thousand guineas) for the St. Leger Stakes. In partnership with Robert Ridsdale, in 1832, he made £85,000 by winning The Derby and St Leger with St. Giles and Margrave.

In 1844 in partnership with John Day, Gully won the 2,000 Guineas with Ugly Buck, and two years later he took the Derby and The Oaks with Pyrrhus The First and Mendicant. In 1854 he won the 2,000 Guineas with Hermit, and in the same year, in partnership with Henry Adwick, the Derby with Andover.

== Political and business interests ==
Having bought Ackworth Park near Pontefract, he became Member of Parliament (MP) for the Pontefract constituency from December 1832 to July 1837. He was elected to the first post-Reform Parliament. In 1862 he purchased the Wingate Grange estate and collieries. A street in Wingate, County Durham is named after him.

Gully died in Durham on 9 March 1863 aged 79. His body was returned to Ackworth where he was interred with his daughter.

== Family ==
Gully was twice married and had twelve children by each wife. His daughter Mary married Thomas Pedley. Their son was the engineer and cricketer William Pedley.

== John Gully in fiction ==
Gully is a real-life character in Royal Flash, one of George MacDonald Fraser's The Flashman Papers series of books. He was played by Henry Cooper in the 1975 film version.

Parliament of the United Kingdom
Preceded by Henry Valentine Stafford-Jerningham and John Savile, Viscount Pollington	Member of Parliament for Pontefract; 1832–1837; With: Henry Valentine Stafford-Jerningham, to 1835; John Savile, Viscount Pollington, to 1835–1837	Succeeded by Richard Monckton Milnes; William Thomas Stanley-Massey-Stanley
