= Great Metropolitan Handicap =

Flat horse race in Britain

- Class: Class 3
- Location: Epsom Downs Racecourse; Epsom, England
- Race type: Flat / Thoroughbred
- Sponsor: Weatherbys
- Website: Epsom

Race information
- Distance: 1 mile 4 furlongs 6 yards (2,420 m) (previously 2 1/4 miles)
- Surface: Turf
- Track: Left-handed
- Qualification: Four-years-old and up
- Weight: Handicap race
- Purse: £20,000 (2024); 1st: £10,308

Great Metropolitan Handicap
2026
Night Breeze	Nunc Est Bibendum	Sing Us A Song

Previous years
2025
Asgard's Captain	Master Builder	Small Fry
2024
Champagne Piaff	Think First	Duke Of Verona
2023
Sir Rumi	Flyin' Solo	Tashi
2022
Going Gone	Mascat	Solent Gateway
2021
Group One Power	Soto Sizzler	Galahad Threepwood

2020-2011
2019
Soto Sizzler	Eddystone Rock	Maybe Today
2018
Royal Line	Golden Wolf	Fire Fighting
2017
Galapiat	Whinging Willie	Barwick
2016
Barwick	Whinging Willie	Prendergast Hill
2015
Lungarno Palace	Jakey	Barwick
2014
Beacon Lady	Da Do Run Run	Dark Ruler
2013
Beyond Conceit	Kuda Huraa	Novirak
2012
Aiken	First Avenue	Communicator
2011
Sunny Game	Rock A Doodle Doo	Harlestone Times

2010-2003
2010
Coin Of The Realm	Final Victory	Mildoura
2009
Hatton Flight	Mezzanisi	Rajeh
2007
Lake Poet	Solent	Dzesmin
2006
Vengeance	Red Racketeer	Sporting Gesture
2005
Tender Falcon	Balkan Knight	Midas Way
2004
Cold Turkey	General	Vengeance
2003
April Stock	Adjawar	Sir Brastias

The Great Metropolitan Handicap is a flat handicap horse race in Great Britain open to horses aged four years or older. It is run over a distance of 1 mile 4 furlongs and 6 yards (2,420 metres) at Epsom in April during the Epsom Spring meeting. Inaugurated in 1846 it originally attracted top-class racehorses in the 19th and early 20th century, but today its importance has been eclipsed by larger stakes races with more valuable purses.

== History ==
The race was created through the efforts of pub landlord, Samuel Powell Beeton in response to a call for support from the Clerk of the Course at Epsom, who wanted to upgrade the Epsom Spring Meeting. Beeton ran The Dolphin pub, near to St Mary-le-Bow church in London, an establishment so well known as a betting premises, it became known as 'the Tattersalls of the East End'. Together with fellow licensees and bookmakers, he raised a collection of £300 to sponsor the race, which for its first year attracted a field of 29 runners. It thus became one of the first horse races in Britain to be sponsored. For this reason, it was, in its early years, referred to as The Publican's Derby. The race proved so successful that more landlords were brought on board to set up another race shortly afterwards - the City and Suburban Handicap.

For more than a century of its existence, the Great Metropolitan was a unique race. It was run over its own two and a quarter mile course, starting at the winning post, running back down the track for three furlongs, turning right across the in-field before rejoining the main course a mile from home. The in-field at Epsom, however, was open to the public, making it difficult to maintain in racing condition. In 1985 legislation was passed allowing the racecourse to fence off part of Epsom Downs and charge for public admission to the in-field. Consequently the race was reduced to a mile and a half and run over the main Derby course. In contrast to its early days, it is now a fairly typical middle ranking, middle distance handicap.

The first occasion that a photo-finish camera was used to decide a result at a British racecourse was for the 1947 Great Metropolitan, run on 22 April 1947, when second place was determined by the camera.

In 1891, a race in United States adopted the same name. Nowadays, the American Metropolitan Handicap, which since 1904, with a few exceptions, has been run at Belmont Park, far eclipses its British counterpart. It is a Grade 1 race which in 2012 was won by Preakness Stakes winner, Shackleford.

== Winners since 1985 ==
Year	Winner	Age	Weight	Jockey	Trainer	Time
1985	Rostova	4	09-02	Steve Cauthen	Clive Brittain	2:43.29
1986	Owen's Pride	4	08-00	Philip Robinson	Reg Akehurst	2:53.58
1987	Osric	4	09-07	Philip Robinson	Mick Ryan	2:39.05
1988	Empire Blue	5	08-11	Richard Quinn	Paul Cole	2:48.85
1989	Empire Blue	6	09-07	Richard Quinn	Paul Cole	2:49.99
1990	Empire Blue	7	10-00	Richard Quinn	Paul Cole	2:38.90
1991 (Note: The 1991 running took place at Kempton Park)	Army Of Stars	6	08-13	Frankie Dettori	Clive Brittain	2:35.00
	No race 1992-96
1997	Prince Kinsky	4	09-02	David Harrison	Jim Old	2:39.09
1998	Assured Gamble	4	09-00	Pat Eddery	Clive Brittain	2:49.35
1999	Kinnescash	6	08-09	Ray Cochrane	Peter Bowen	2:44.43
2000	Zilarator	4	09-06	Richard Quinn	William Haggas	2:54.60
2001	Spring Pursuit	5	08-07	Paul Doe	Richard Price	2:51.82
2002	Salim Toto	4	09-00	Richard Hughes	Hughie Morrison	2:39.19
2003	April Stock	8	09-03	Kieren Fallon	Gerard Butler	2:38.40
2004	Cold Turkey	4	08-12	Simon Whitworth	Gary Moore	2:53.93
2005	Tender Falcon	5	08-07	Sam Hitchcott	Ron Hodges	2:43.18
2006	Vengeance	6	09-03	Pat Dobbs	Simon Dow	2:42.52
2007	Lake Poet	4	08-11	Seb Sanders	Clive Brittain	2:40.31
2008	No race (Note: In 2008, Epsom racecourse was closed for redevelopment, only opening for the two day Derby meeting.)
2009	Hatton Flight	5	09-00	William Buick	Andrew Balding	2:38.56
2010	Coin Of The Realm	5	09-01	Ryan Moore	Gary Moore	2:37.50
2011	Sunny Game	4	08-09	Jamie Spencer	Michael Bell	2:39.15
2012	Aiken	4	09-03	William Buick	John Gosden	2:52.66
2013	Beyond Conceit	4	08-13	Jamie Spencer	Andrew Balding	2:37.54
2014	Beacon Lady	5	09-00	Jack Duern	William Knight	2:40.65
2015	Lungarno Palace	4	08-11	Tom Queally	John Gallagher	2:42.12
2016	Barwick	8	08-13	Steve Drowne	George Baker	2:49.52
2017	Galapiat	4	09-11	Franny Norton	Mark Johnston	2:41.79
2018	Royal Line	4	09-07	James Doyle	John Gosden	2:40.36
2019	Soto Sizzler	4	08-09	Oisin Murphy	William Knight	2:35.89
	no race 2020 (Note: The 2020 running was cancelled because of the COVID-19 pandemic in the United Kingdom)
2021	Group One Power	4	08-11	Silvestre de Sousa	Andrew Balding	2:43.58
2022	Going Gone	4	09-04	Pat Cosgrave	Jim Boyle	2:42.67
2023	Sir Rumi	5	09-09	William Buick	Richard Hannon Jr.	2:54.83
2024	Champagne Piaff	6	09-03	Ryan Moore	Gary Moore	2:38.45
2025	Asgard's Captain	5	08-12	David Egan	Dylan Cunha	2:38.87
2026	Night Breeze	6	09-01	Rossa Ryan	Ian Williams	2:41.68

== See also ==
- Horse racing in Great Britain
- List of British flat horse races

== Bibliography ==
- Lambie, James (2010). The Story of Your Life: A History of the Sporting Life Newspaper (1859-1998). Leicester: Troubador Publishing Ltd. ISBN 9781848762916.
