= Cesarewitch Handicap =

Flat horse race in Britain

- Class: Handicap
- Location: Rowley Mile; Newmarket, England
- Inaugurated: 1839
- Race type: Flat / Thoroughbred
- Sponsor: Together For Racing International
- Website: https://www.thejockeyclub.co.uk/newmarket/ Newmarket]

Race information
- Distance: 2m 2f (3,621 metres)
- Surface: Turf
- Track: Right-hand "L"
- Qualification: Three-years-old and up
- Weight: Handicap
- Purse: £175,000 (2025); 1st: £90,195

Cesarewitch Handicap
2026
Alphonse Le Grande	Sea Lantern	Dawn Rising

Previous years
2025
Beylerbeyi	Dawn Rising	Bunting
2024
Alphonse Le Grande	Manxman	Aqwaam
2023
The Shunter	Pied Piper	Tashkhan
2022
Run For Oscar	Vino Victrix	Not So Sleepy
2021
Buzz	Burning Victory	Calling The Wind

2020-2011
2020
Great White Shark	Summer Moon	Takarengo
2019
Stratum	Party Playboy	Summer Moon
2018
Low Sun	Uradel	Cleonte
2017
Withhold	London Prize	Lagostovegas
2016
Sweet Selection	First Mohican	Sea Of Heaven
2015
Grumeti	Oriental Fox	Quick Jack
2014
Big Easy	De Rigueur	Quick Jack
2013
Scatter Dice	Waterclock	Lieutenant Miller
2012
Aaim To Prosper	Countrywide Flame	Tominator
2011
Never Can Tell	Ermyn Lodge	Colour Vision

2010-2001
2010
Aaim To Prosper	La Vecchia Scuola	Plymouth Rock
2009
Darley Sun	Mamlook	Sereth
2008
Caracciola	Arc Bleu	Mamlook
2007
Leg Spinner	Caracciola	Fair Along
2006
Detroit City	Inchnadamph	Dr Sharp
2005
Sergeant Cecil	King Revo	Inchnadamph
2004
Contact Dancer	Mr Ed	High Point
2003
Landing Light	Sun Bird	Kristensen
2002
Miss Fara	Direct Bearing	Dubai Seven Stars
2001
Distant Prospect	Palua	Give Notice

2000-1991
2000
Heros Fatal	Wave Of Optimism	Barba Papa
1999
Top Cees	Dominant Duchess	Heros Fatal
1998
Spirit Of Love	Etterby Park	Spunkie
1997
Turnpole	Top Cees	Mawared
1996
Inchcailloch	En Vacances	Canon Can
1995
Old Red	Nanton Point	Top Cees
1994
Captain's Guest	Argyle Cavalier	New Reputation
1993
Aahsaylad	Ritto	My Desire
1992
Vintage Crop	Specificity	Farat
1991
Go South	Bardolph	Farsi

1990-1988
1990
Trainglot	Further Flight	Clifton Chapel
1989
Double Dutch	Chelsea Girl	Travelling Light
1988
Nomadic Way	Double Dutch	Faux Pavillon

The Cesarewitch Handicap is a flat handicap horse race in Great Britain open to horses aged three years or older. It is run at Newmarket over a distance of 2 miles and 2 furlongs (3,621 metres), and finishes on the Rowley Mile. It is scheduled to take place each year in October.

== History ==
"Cesarewitch" is an anglicised version of Tsesarevich, the title of the heir to the throne in Imperial Russia. The race was named in honour of Tsesarevich Alexander (later Tsar Alexander II), after he donated £300 to the Jockey Club.

The event was established in 1839, and the inaugural running was won by Cruiskeen. It was founded in the same year as another major handicap at Newmarket, the Cambridgeshire. The two races came to be known as the Autumn Double.

The Cesarewitch initially took place before the Cambridgeshire, but the schedule was later reversed and it is now held two weeks after the other race. Three horses completed the double in the 19th century — Rosebery (1876), Foxhall (1881) and Plaisanterie (1885) — but the feat has been rarely attempted since then.

The race was formerly staged during Newmarket's Champions' Day meeting in mid-October and became part of a new fixture called "Future Champions Day" in 2011. In 2014 the Cesarewitch was separated from Future Champions Day, which was moved back a week in the calendar, and in 2015 it returned to the Saturday of the new Future Champions Festival.

== Records ==
Most successful horse (2 wins):

- Aaim To Prosper - 2010, 2012
- Alphonse Le Grande - 2024, 2026

Leading jockey (6 wins):

- Doug Smith – Canatrice (1939), French Design (1954), Sandiacre (1957), Come to Daddy (1959), Alcove (1960), Persian Lancer (1966)

Leading trainer (4 wins):

- William Day – Haco (1853), Dulcibella (1860), Thalestris (1864), Foxhall (1881)
- Mathew Dawson – Lioness (1863), Julius (1867), Salvanos (1872), Stone Clink (1886)

== Winners since 1900 ==
- Weights given in stones and pounds.

Year	Winner	Age	Weight	Jockey	Trainer	SP	Time
1900	Clarehaven	4	7-13	William Halsey	Peter Gilpin	6/1	3:51.40
1901	Balsarroch	3	6-05	Monty Aylin	Ryan	25/1	4:05.60
1902	Black Sand	5	8-02	Kempton Cannon	Luis Alvarez	8/1	3:52.00
1903	Grey Tick	7			Walter Nightingall
1904	Wargrave	6	7-04	Alfred Sharples Sr.	James Batho	5/1 F	3:59.00
1905	Hammerkop	5	8-09	Bernard Dillon	Peter Gilpin	100/14	3:55.40
1906	Mintagon	5	7-00	Charlie Trigg	William I'Anson	6/1	3:56.80
1907	Demure	4	6-09	Frank Wootton	John Brewer	4/1	3:59.20
1908	Yentoi	4	7-01	Freddie Fox	Fred Darling	100/6	3:53.80
1909	Submit	3	6-13	Joseph Plant	Charles Morton	33/1	3:57.20
1910	Verney	4	7-11	Frank Wootton	Peter Gilpin	7/1	4:00.60
1911	Willonyx	4	8-05	Billy Higgs	Sam Darling	9/2 JF	3:54.60
1912	Walingham	3	6-12	George Clout	Goodgames	33/1	3:53.80
1913	Fiz-Yama	4	7-07	Fred Herbert	Morris	50/1	3:51.60
1914	Troubadour	3	6-09	Charles Dickens	William Halsey	66/1	3:54.20
1915	Son-in-Law	4	8-05	Frank Bullock	Reg Day	11/1	3:47.00
1916	Sanctum	4	7-09	Steve Donoghue	Atty Persse	9/4 F	3:48.80
1917	Furore	4	8-06	Herbert Robbins	Charles Tabor	100/7	3:54.60
1918	Air Raid	3	8-01	Otto Madden	Alec Taylor Jr.	8/1	3:57.40
1919	Ivanhoe	6	7-12	Albert Whalley	Harry Cottrill	100/6	3:49.60
1920	Bracket	3	7-07	Steve Donoghue	Reg Day	8/1	3:46.60
1921	Yutoi	4	8-05	Henri Jelliss	George Dundas	100/8	3:49.40
1922	Light Dragoon	4	7-03	Thomas Pryor	Harper	100/1	3:46.80
1923	Rose Prince	4	8-03	George Archibald Sr.	Sam H Darling	25/1	3:48.00
1924	Charley's Mount	3	7-10	Thomas Pryor	Richard Dawson	100/1	3:55.00
1925	Forseti	5	8-03	Harry Beasley Jr.	Sam H Darling	25/1	3:52.00
1926	Myra Gray	6	6-01	Lionel Read	J Scott	50/1	3:45.80
1927	Eagle's Pride	4	7-00	Johnny Dines	Edwin Martin	9/1	3:50.20
1928	Arctic Star	4	8-02	Richard Perryman	Charles Tabor	9/1	3:55.60
1929	West Wicklow	5	7-06	Cliff Richards	Lance Todd	28/1	3:41.40
1930	Ut Majeur	3	8-03	Michael Beary	Richard Dawson	100/8	3:54.20
1931	Noble Star	4	8-12	Freddie Fox	Len Cundell	100/6	3:55.00
1932	Nitsichin	4	8-09	Michael Beary	Peter Thrale	10/1	3:51.40
1933	Seminole	4	8-00	Freddie Fox	Cecil Boyd-Rochfort	100/6	3:47.00
1934	Enfield	3	7-10	Jack Sirett	Cecil Boyd-Rochfort	7/1 F	3:48.20
1935	Near Relation	3	7-09	Eph Smith	Frank Butters	22/1	3:53.40
1936	Fet	5	6-12	Albert Richardson	Harry Hedges	10/1	3:53.00
1937	Punch	4	7-11	Sam Wragg	Charles Tabor	17/1	4:06.00
1938	Contrevent	3	6-10	Arthur Tucker	Arthur Tucker	100/7	3:55.20
1939 (Note: The 1939, 1940, 1941 and 1943 runnings were held over Newmarket's Summer Course of 2m 24yds.)	Cantatrice II	4	7-05	Doug Smith	Frank Butters	7/2 F	3:32.20
1940	Hunters Moon IV	4	9-05	Gordon Richards	Fred Darling	100/8	3:27.20
1941	Filator	3	7-12	Sam Wragg	Ossie Bell	100/9	3:28.40
1942	no race
1943	Germanicus	7	9-09	Harry Wragg	Henri Jelliss	6/5 F
1944	no race
1945	Kerry Piper	4	8-01	Edgar Britt	Sam Armstrong	25/1	3:56.60
1946	Monsieur l'Amiral	5	8-05	Harry Wragg	Elijah Charlier	33/1	3:52.80
1947	Whiteway	3	7-12	Bill Evans	Willie Pratt	100/8	3:47.80
1948	Woodburn	3	7-13	Edgar Britt	Charles Elsey	100/9	3:51.80
1949	Strathspey	4	7-11	Eph Smith	Noel Cannon	25/1	3:50.60
1950	Above Board	3	7-10	Eph Smith	Cecil Boyd-Rochfort	18/1	3:49.80
1951	Three Cheers	3	7-08	Manny Mercer	Peter Thrale	17/2	3:56.00
1952	Flush Royal	7	8-13	Billy Nevett	Jack Fawcus	33/1	3:54.41
1953	Chantry	4	8-04	Ken Gethin	Staff Ingham	4/1 F	4:00.73
1954	French Design	7	8-03	Doug Smith	George Todd	100/6	3:53.42
1955	Curry	4	7-06	Paul Tulk	Sam Armstrong	100/6	3:57.62
1956	Prelone	3	7-03	Eddie Hide	Bill Hide	20/1	3:54.66
1957	Sandiacre	5	7-08	Doug Smith	Bill Dutton	100/8	4:01.22
1958	Morecambe	5	9-01	Joe Sime	Sam Hall	15/2 F	4:01.86
1959	Come To Daddy	4	7-08	Doug Smith	Wilfrid Lyde	6/1 JF	3:51.30
1960	Alcove	3	7-08	Doug Smith	Jack Watts	100/30 F	4:03.40
1961	Avon's Pride	4	7-11	Eph Smith	Dick Hern	100/8	3:57.92
1962	Golden Fire (Note: In 1962, Orchardist was first past the post, but was disqualified for boring and placed second.)	4	7-11	David Yeats	Doug Marks	25/1	3:56.32
1963	Utrillo	6	8-00	Joe Sime	Ryan Price	100/8	3:55.80
1964	Grey Of Falloden	5	9-06	Joe Mercer	Dick Hern	20/1	3:59.20
1965	Mintmaster	4	7-09	Joe Sime	A Cooper	13/2	4:06.69
1966	Persian Lancer	8	7-08	Doug Smith	Ryan Price	100/7	4:00.09
1967	Boismoss	3	7-01	Ernie Johnson	Mick Easterby	13/1	3:53.76
1968	Major Rose	6	9-04	Lester Piggott	Ryan Price	9/1 F	3:57.79
1969	Floridian	5	7-03	Dennis McKay	Tommy Shedden	20/1	3:59.36
1970	Scoria	4	7-00	Dennis McKay	Con Crossley	33/1	4:05.06
1971	Orosio	4	8-02	Geoff Lewis	Henry Cecil	5/1	4:15.78
1972	Cider With Rosie	4	7-11	Taffy Thomas	Staff Ingham	14/1	4:03.01
1973	Flash Imp	4	7-08	Terry Cain	Ron Smyth	25/1	3:56.72
1974	Ocean King	8	7-07	Tommy Carter	Arthur Pitt	25/1	3:59.85
1975	Shantallah	3	8-10	Brian Taylor	Harry Wragg	7/1	4:06.58
1976	John Cherry	5	9-13	Lester Piggott	Jeremy Tree	13/2	3:57.25
1977	Assured	4	8-04	Philip Waldron	Henry Candy	10/1	3:53.61
1978	Centurion	3	9-08	John Matthias	Ian Balding	9/2 F	4:03.54
1979	Sir Michael	3	7-08	Mark Rimmer	Geoff Huffer	10/1	4:07.97
1980	Popsi's Joy	4	8-06	Lester Piggott	Michael Haynes	10/1	3:54.11
1981	Halsbury	3	8-04	Joe Mercer	Peter Walwyn	14/1	4:01.89
1982	Mountain Lodge	3	7-10	Willie Carson	John Dunlop	9/1	4:01.50
1983	Bajan Sunshine	4	8-08	Brian Rouse	Rod Simpson	7/1 JF	3:57.23
1984	Tom Sharp	4	7-05	Steve Dawson	Walter Wharton	40/1	3:48.27
1985	Kayudee	5	8-01	Tony Murray	Jimmy FitzGerald	7/1	3:51.43
1986 (Note: The 1986 and 1999 editions were held on Newmarket's July Course over a slightly shorter distance)	Orange Hill	4	7-09	Richard Fox	Jeremy Tree	20/1	3:43.93
1987	Private Audition	5	7-09	Gary Carter	Mark Tompkins	50/1	3:59.05
1988	Nomadic Way	3	7-09	Willie Carson	Barry Hills	6/1 JF	4:00.61
1989	Double Dutch	5	9-10	Billy Newnes	Brooke Sanders	15/2	3:51.32
1990	Trainglot	3	7-12	Willie Carson	Jimmy FitzGerald	13/2	3:50.90
1991	Go South	7	7-11	Nicky Carlisle	John Jenkins	33/1	3:52.76
1992	Vintage Crop	5	9-06	Walter Swinburn	Dermot Weld	5/1 F	3:49.16
1993	Aahsaylad	7	8-12	John Williams	John White	12/1	3:59.52
1994	Captain's Guest	4	9-09	Tony Clark	Guy Harwood	25/1	3:56.79
1995	Old Red	5	7-11	Lindsay Charnock	Mary Reveley	11/1	3:52.62
1996	Inchcailloch	7	7-03	Royston Ffrench	Jeff King	20/1	3:51.17
1997	Turnpole	6	7-10	Lindsay Charnock	Mary Reveley	16/1	3:53.56
1998	Spirit of Love	3	8-08	Olivier Peslier	Mark Johnston	11/1	3:51.23
1999	Top Cees	9	8-10	Kieren Fallon	Ian Balding	7/1	3:40.30
2000	Heros Fatal	6	8-01	Gary Carter	Martin Pipe	11/1	3:54.91
2001	Distant Prospect	4	8-08	Martin Dwyer	Ian Balding	14/1	4:00.27
2002	Miss Fara	7	8-00	Ryan Moore	Martin Pipe	12/1	3:51.22
2003	Landing Light	8	9-04	Pat Eddery	Nicky Henderson	12/1	3:52.33
2004	Contact Dancer	5	8-02	Royston Ffrench	Mark Johnston	16/1	3:58.52
2005	Sergeant Cecil	6	9-08	Alan Munro	Rod Millman	10/1	3:54.79
2006	Detroit City	4	9-01	Jamie Spencer	Philip Hobbs	9/2 F	3:57.84
2007	Leg Spinner	6	8-11	Johnny Murtagh	Tony Martin	14/1	3:54.13
2008	Caracciola	11	9-06	Eddie Ahern	Nicky Henderson	50/1	3:48.30
2009	Darley Sun	3	8-06	Andrea Atzeni	David Simcock	9/2 F	3:50.27
2010	Aaim to Prosper	6	7-13	Louis Beuzelin	Brian Meehan	16/1	3:59.10
2011	Never Can Tell	4	8-11	Frankie Dettori	Jamie Osborne	25/1	3:48.04
2012	Aaim to Prosper	8	9-10	Kieren Fallon	Brian Meehan	66/1	3:51.51
2013	Scatter Dice	4	8-08	Silvestre de Sousa	Mark Johnston	66/1	3:52.75
2014	Big Easy	7	8-07	Tom Queally	Philip Hobbs	10/1	3:49.10
2015	Grumeti	7	8-02	Adam Beschizza	Alan King	50/1	3:56.02
2016	Sweet Selection	4	8-08	Silvestre de Sousa	Hughie Morrison	7/1	3:53.41
2017	Withhold	4	8-08	Silvestre de Sousa	Roger Charlton	5/1 F	3:45.59
2018	Low Sun	5	9-02	Seamie Heffernan	Willie Mullins	10/1	3:48.96
2019	Stratum	6	9-02	Jason Watson	Willie Mullins	25/1	3:58.64
2020	Great White Shark	6	8-06	Jason Watson	Willie Mullins	9/2 F	3:55.15
2021	Buzz	7	8-13	Oisin Murphy	Nicky Henderson	8/1	3:48.43
2022	Run For Oscar	7	8-11	David Egan	Charles Byrnes	4/1	3:52.87
2023	The Shunter	10	9-01	James Doyle	Emmet Mullins	12/1	3:52.64
2024	Alphonse Le Grande (Note: The race was later awarded to Manxman by the BHA Whip Review Committee, but was returned to Alphonse Le Grande on appeal.)	5	8-03	Jamie Powell	Cathy O'Leary	33/1	3:57.42
2025	Beylerbeyi	5	8-11	Billy Loughnane	Ian Williams	7/1	3:47.95
2026	Alphonse Le Grande	7	8-06	Patrick McGettigan	Tony Martin	18/1	3:46.45

== Earlier winners ==
- 1839: Cruiskeen
- 1840: Clarion
- 1841: Iliona
- 1842: Arcanus
- 1843: Corranna
- 1844: Faugh-a-Ballagh
- 1845: The Baron
- 1846: Wit's End
- 1847: Caurouch
- 1848: The Cur, owned by William Stuart Stirling-Crawfurd
- 1849: Legerdemain
- 1850: Glauca
- 1851: Mrs Taft
- 1852: Weathergage
- 1853: Haco
- 1854: Muscovite
- 1855: Mr Sykes
- 1856: Vengeance
- 1857: Prioress (Note: The 1857 running finished as a three-way dead-heat, but it was decided by a run-off)
- 1858: Rocket
- 1859: Artless
- 1860: Dulcibella
- 1861: Audrey
- 1862: Hartington
- 1863: Lioness
- 1864: Thalestris
- 1865: Salpinctes
- 1866: Lecturer
- 1867: Julius
- 1868: Cecil
- 1869: Cherie
- 1870: Cardinal York
- 1871: Corisande
- 1872: Salvanos
- 1873: King Lud
- 1874: Aventuriere
- 1875: Duke of Parma
- 1876: Rosebery
- 1877: Hilarious
- 1878: Jester
- 1879: Chippendale
- 1880: Robert the Devil
- 1881: Foxhall
- 1882: Corrie Roy
- 1883: Don Juan
- 1884: St Gatien
- 1885: Plaisanterie
- 1886: Stone Clink
- 1887: Humewood
- 1888: Tenebreuse
- 1889: Primrose Day
- 1890: Sheen
- 1891: Ragimunde
- 1892: Burnaby
- 1893: Cypria / Red Eyes (Note: The 1893 race was a dead-heat and has joint winners)
- 1894: Childwick
- 1895: Rockdove
- 1896: St Bris
- 1897: Merman
- 1898: Chaleureux
- 1899: Scintillant

== See also ==
- Horse racing in Great Britain
- List of British flat horse races
