= Danebury =

Iron Age hillfort in Hampshire, England

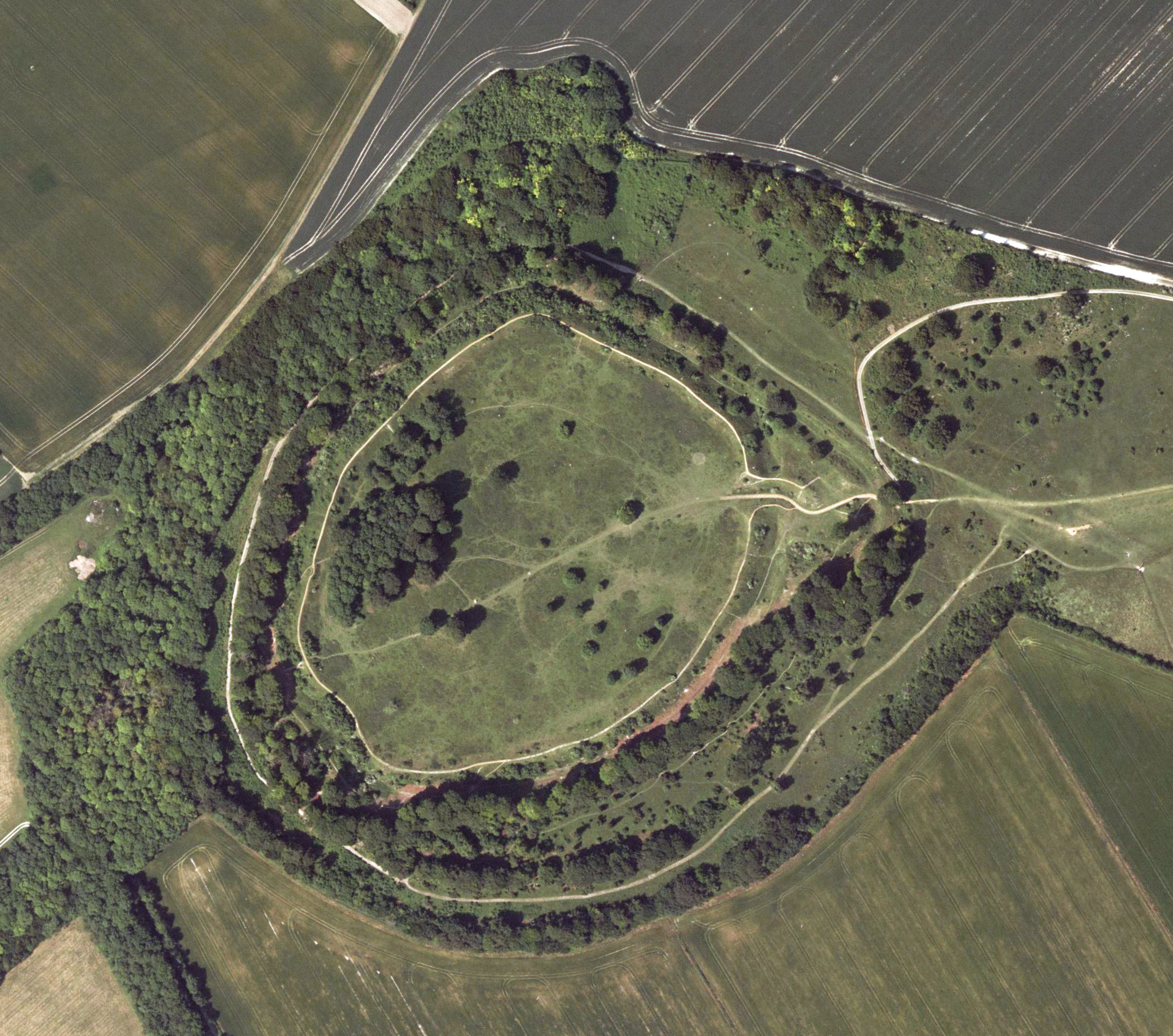
- Aerial image of Danebury

- Location within Hampshire
- 51.136681°N 1.537569°W
- Type: Hillfort
- Periods: Iron Age
- Location: Hampshire, England

History
- Built: c. 550 BC
- Abandoned: c. 100 BC

Site notes
- Area: 5 hectares (12 acres)
- Excavation dates: 1969 – 1988
- Public access: Yes

Scheduled monument
- Official name: Danebury Hill camp
- Reference no.: 1001949

Danebury Hillfort
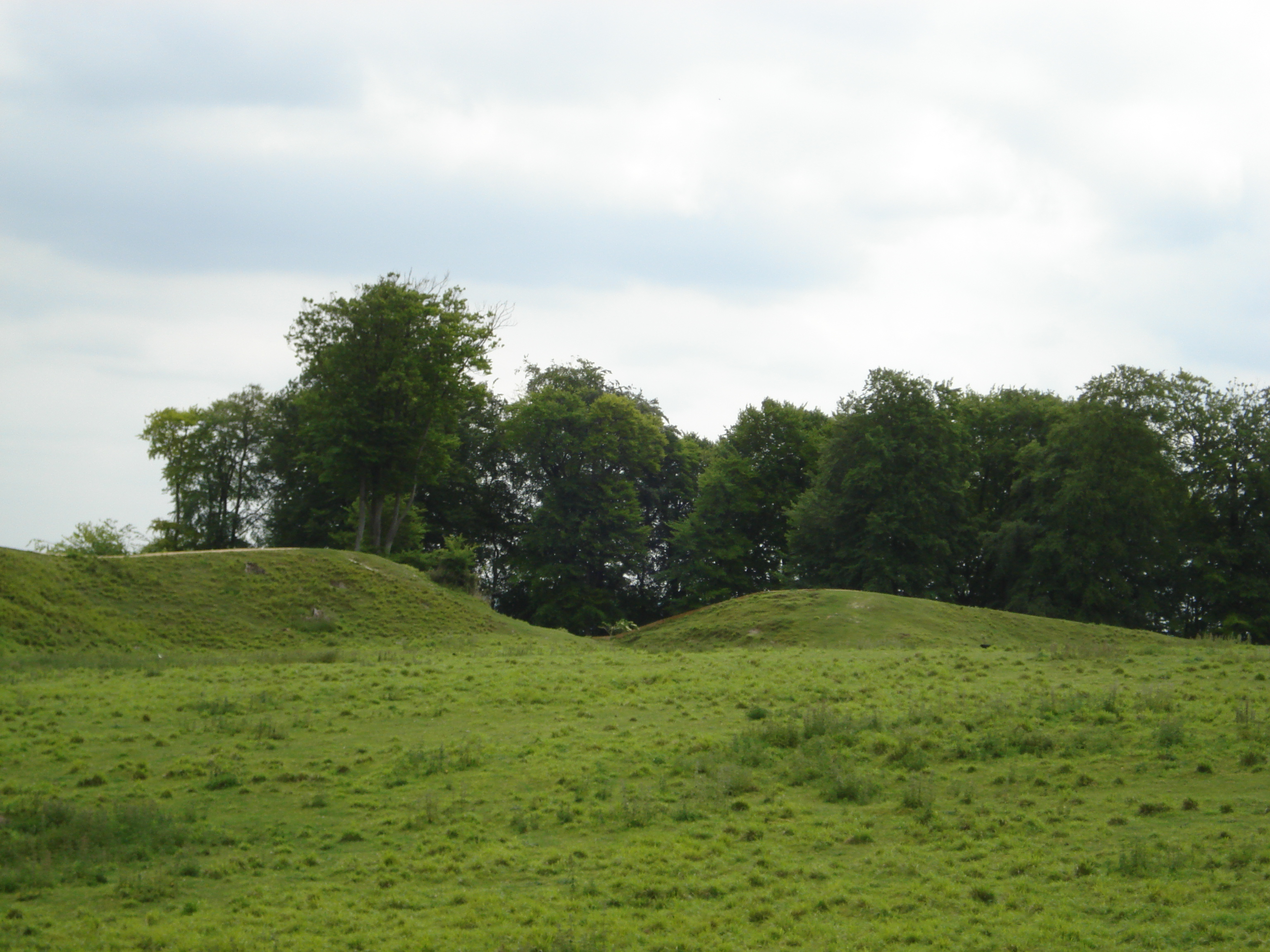
- Entrance to the hillfort
- Interactive map of Danebury Hillfort
- Type: Local Nature Reserve
- Location: Nether Wallop, Hampshire
- OS grid: SU 326 376
- Area: 39 hectares (96 acres)
- Manager: Hampshire Countryside Service

Danebury (formerly ‘Dunnebury Hill’) is an Iron Age hillfort in Hampshire, England, about 19 kilometres (12 mi) north-west of Winchester (grid reference SU323376). The site, covering 5 hectares (12 acres), was excavated by Barry Cunliffe over twenty years. Danebury is considered a type site for hillforts, and was important in developing the understanding of hillforts, as very few others have been so intensively excavated.

Built in the 6th century BC, the fort was used for almost 500 years, during a period when the number of hillforts in Wessex greatly increased. Danebury was remodelled several times, making it more complex and resulting in it becoming a "developed" hillfort. It is a Scheduled Monument and a Local Nature Reserve called Danebury Hillfort. The Scheduled Monument is surrounded by a Site of Special Scientific Interest, designated as Danebury Hill.

== Investigation ==
Until the 19th century very little was known about hillforts, as none had been excavated and their original purpose had been long forgotten. In the medieval period, their construction was attributed variously to iconic figures such as King Arthur, King Alfred, the Danes, Julius Caesar, and even giants. By the 18th century, it was widely thought that hillforts were Roman in origin.

Interest in hillforts was roused by the investigation of a hillfort at Worlebury Hill in the early-19th century. The first excavation at Danebury was carried out in November 1859, under antiquarian Augustus Wollaston Franks. His workers cleared out an Iron Age pit that was 2 metres (7 ft) deep and 1.5 m (5 ft) in diameter, although they were not able to ascertain its purpose.

The first widespread investigation of hillforts was carried out in the second half of the 19th century under Augustus Pitt-Rivers. Pitt-Rivers' work on the hillforts of Sussex led him to the conclusion that most hillforts were built in the Iron Age, and it paved the way for future work on hillforts. In the 1920s and 1930s, there was "hillfort mania" in British archaeology; by 1940, about 80 had been archaeologically excavated.

In the late 1960s, Barry Cunliffe decided to examine a single hillfort and its surrounding territory in an attempt to shed light on Iron Age society, its politics, and population. With the permission of the site's owner, Hampshire County Council, archaeological excavations began in 1969 and continued until 1988. Over the twenty seasons archaeologists spent examining the site, they looked at the defences and the gateway, and excavated 57% of the interior, where the remains of wattle and timber houses were discovered. It was the lengthiest investigation of any hillfort in western Europe. Cunliffe published his findings extensively.

A further non-invasive survey was carried out in 1997, as part of the Wessex Hillforts Project, using a magnetometer.

== Etymology ==
The Prioress of Amesbury Abbey and Church of St Mary and St Melor, Amesbury was granted a July fair by Henry VII in 1491, that named Dunnebury Hill. It lies two miles north east of Nether Wallop, which the abbey acquired in 1177. It is mentioned again as Dunbury in John Norden’s 1595 map of Hampshire. Coates names it as ‘dun’+’burh’ (‘hill fort’) in a 1989 article.

== History ==
There is no historical record of events in Iron Age Britain, so archaeological investigation is the only way to reconstruct the history of Danebury and other forts. It is impossible to state with certainty every significant event in the hillfort’s history, but where an event leaves an archaeologically identifiable trace, a general chronology can be established, although dates are much less easy to establish. The hillfort was occupied from the mid-6th century BC until around 100 BC, and the defences were remodelled numerous times.

Early in its life the site consisted of a single ditch encompassing an area of about 5 ha (12 acres), with two gateways, one in the south-west and another in the east; two more rings of ditches were added later. The north part of the fort was occupied by four-post structures, probably granaries, which were later replaced by storage pits, and in the south part, there were roundhouses in between granaries and storage pits. When Danebury was built in the 6th century BC, it coincided with the construction of several other hillforts in the Wessex region, all of a similar size and layout.

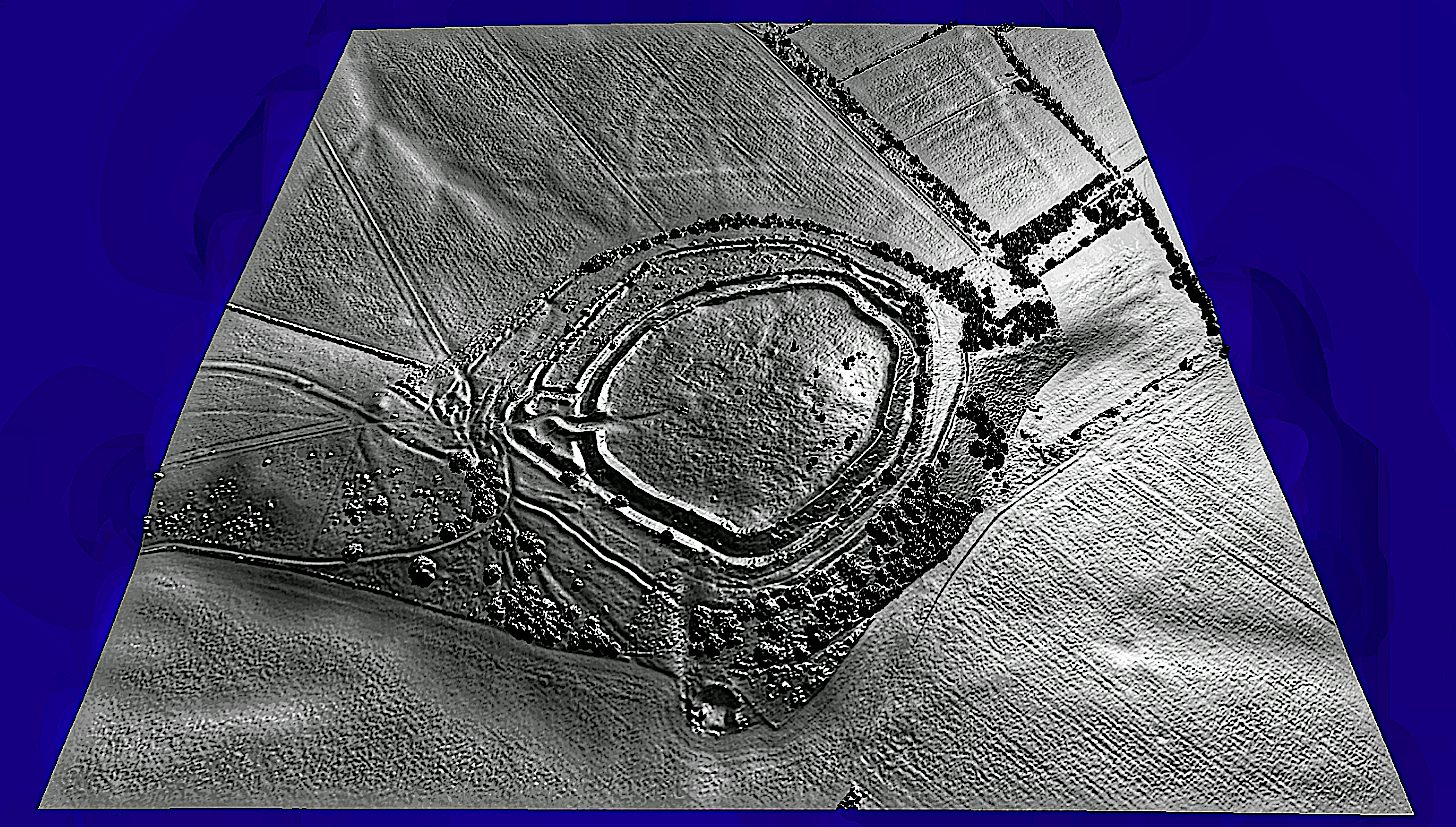
A lidar view of Danebury hillfort and Celtic-like field system.

The first phase of defences dates from around 550 BC, and consists of a rampart behind a ditch. When the ditch was cut, the chalk rubble fill was used to build the rampart, along with some of the local clay soil. The material was contained by timber, making it a box rampart with a vertical face. The east gateway was a simple 4 m (13 ft) gap in the defences with a timber gatehouse (the south-west gateway has not been excavated).

At least 50 years after the rampart was first built, it was raised with the addition of more chalk material; this has been interpreted as maintenance work when the ramparts began to collapse as the timber box started to rot. Around the same time the ramparts were altered, the east gateway was widened to 9 m (30 ft). The gates were burnt down not long after the east gateway was altered. For a short time the hillfort was gateless; when the east gateway was repaired the passage from the entrance was lengthened.

In around 400 BC the third phase heightened the rampart and at the same time the ditch was re-dug. The V-shaped ditch was 6 m (20 ft) deep and between 11 m (36 ft) and 12 m (39 ft) wide; the size of the previous ditch is unknown as re-cutting the ditch has made it hard to ascertain. The wooden box was abandoned in favour of allowing the rampart to slope down to the ditch, but to provide protection the rampart would probably have been surmounted by a dry stone wall made from flint. From the top of the ramparts to the bottom of the ditch is about 16 m (52 ft).

Although the rampart and ditch were in use for a long time, during this period the east gateway was remodelled twice, making it longer, and creating earthworks on each side of the approach. The southwest gateway was given extra defences in the form of earthworks before being abandoned and filled in. Also in this period, the southern part of the fort became populated with four- and six-post structures, probably granaries, replacing the earlier roundhouses. The fort's centre was probably used for shrines while houses were mainly built close to the ramparts. A new series of earthworks was created beyond the already existing ring, turning Danebury into a complex multivallate (more than one series of earthworks) fort. These earthworks added 5.3 ha (13 acres) to the fort and were probably used to protect livestock. Cunliffe introduced and detailed the concept of "special animal deposits" (and their ritual implications in grain storage pits) in his landmark 1992 work on “Pits, Preachers and Propitiation”. The residents knew horses as draught animals and dogs as animal husbandry guardians for sheep, cattle and swine.

Danebury was abandoned around 100 BC, in common with the trend across Britain for hillforts to fall out of use around that time. Once again, the east gate was burnt down, although this time it was not replaced. Most of the inhabitants deserted Danebury, and groups of bodies were disposed of in charnel pits. The site continued in use, but on a much smaller scale than before. Buildings were left to decay and the interior of the fort became used for grazing. By the start of the 1st century AD, the settlement of Danebury was probably nothing more than a single farm.

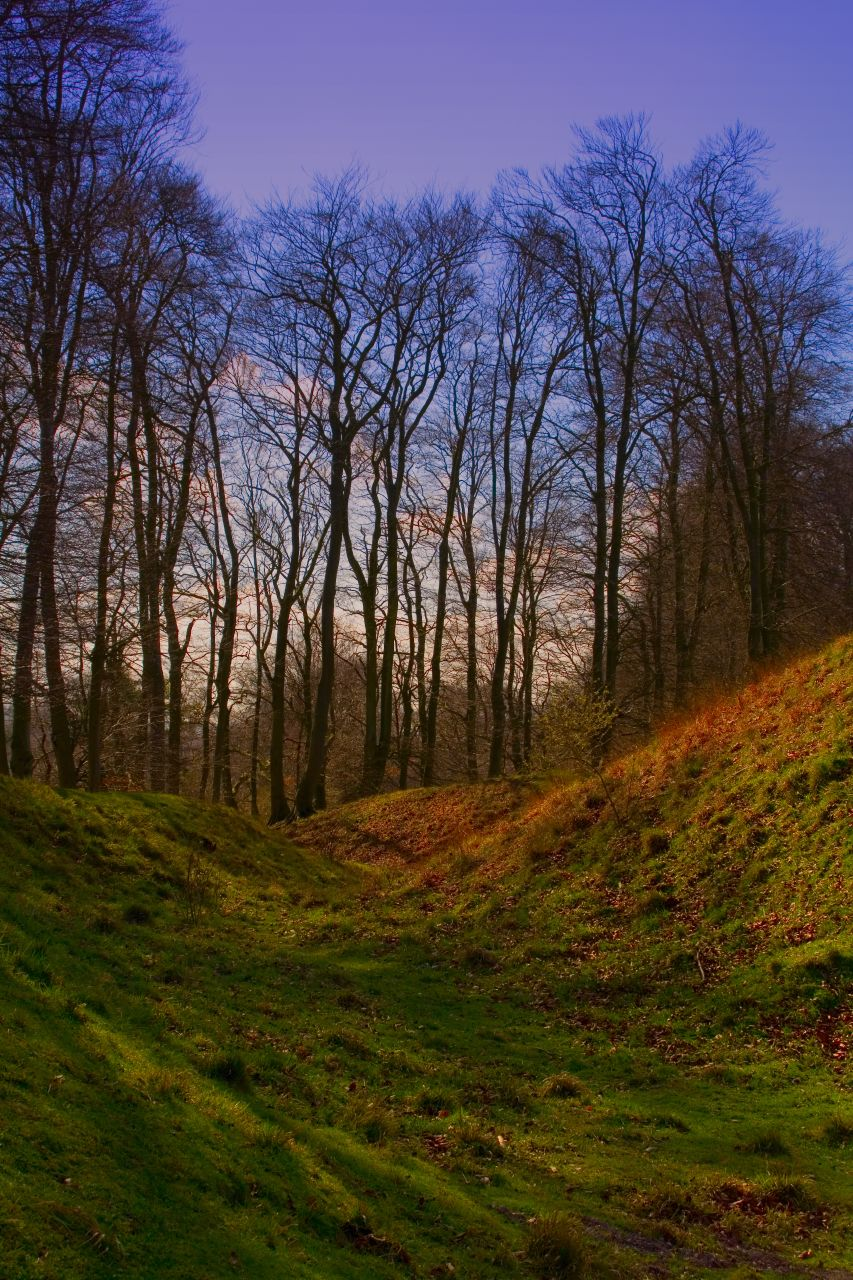
Inside the ditch surrounding Danebury

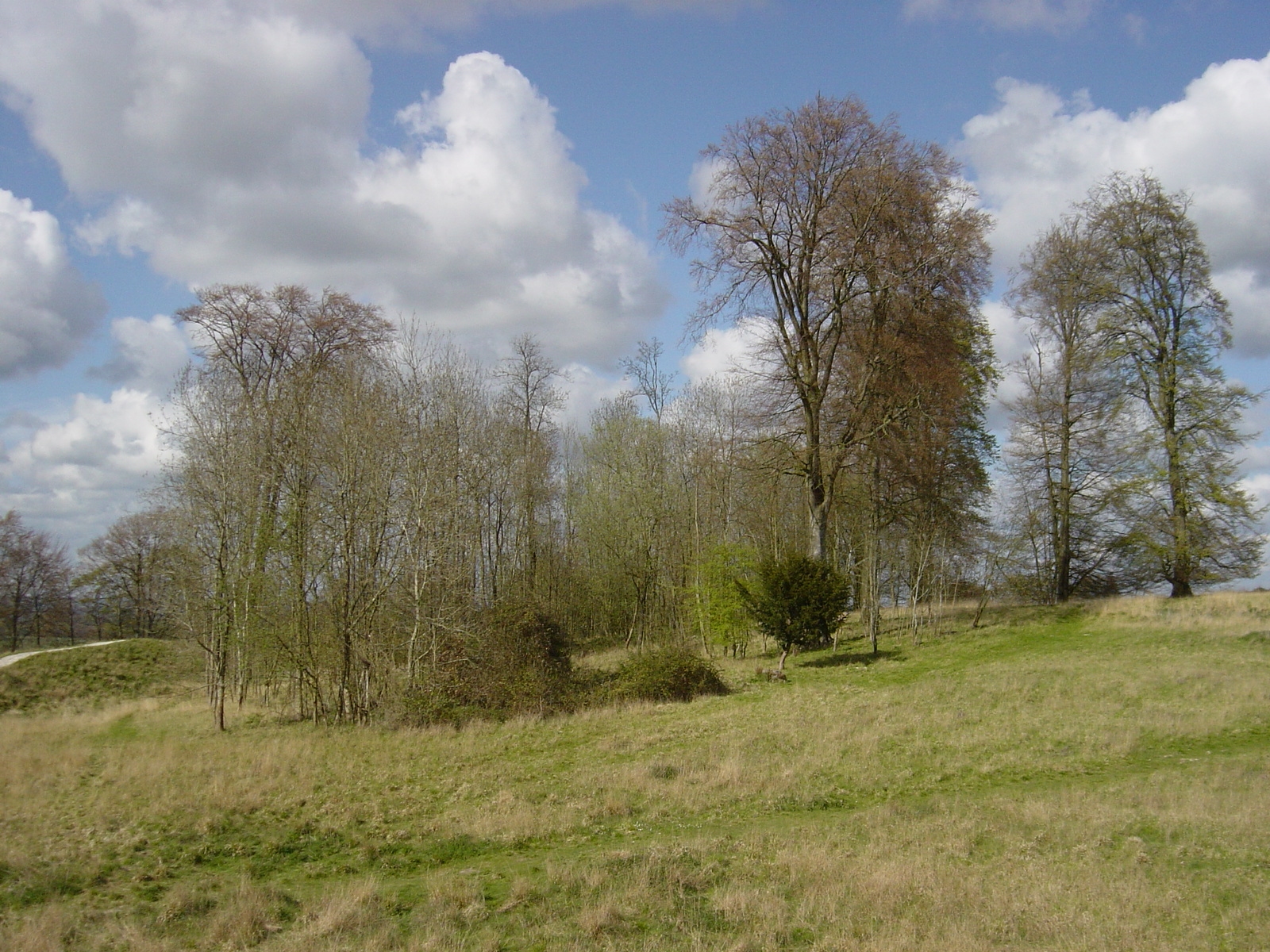
Trees within Danebury

== Hillfort ==
Danebury Hill, on top of which the hillfort sits, rises to 143 m (469 ft). The hillfort dominates the local landscape, which rarely rises above 100 m (330 ft), and has commanding views of the area. The surrounding country has light soil that would have been easily cultivated. Territory commanded by Danebury included areas of forest, pasture in the uplands, and access to water sources in the form of the River Test. To the west runs Wallop Brook which flows south east into the River Test.

The nearby hillforts of Figsbury Ring, Quarley Hill and Bury Hill were probably established around the same time as Danebury. All of a similar size, the hillforts were generally equally spaced, commanding similar sized territories and resources. There is some debate whether hillforts were purely defensive structures, and to what extent they were occupied. Cunliffe interprets the ramparts as essentially defensive, although he concedes that they may have been a means of displaying wealth and power, as Danebury would have been visible for miles around.

The ramparts were the strongest part of the fort, with the entrances the weakest. The complex gateways support the view that the site was militaristic; the long, curving east entrance maximised the time it would have taken for attackers to enter the fort and would have allowed defenders on the ramparts more time to hurl missiles, while the southwest entrance narrowed, forcing attackers together and causing disarray. Iron Age society was, in Cunliffe's view, "effervescent ... essentially unstable, and prone to conflict", and he uses the possible military nature of hillforts to support this view. The burning of the gates was probably the result of an attack, and the charnel pits dating from the end of the intense period of Danebury's occupation contain about 100 bodies, many with injuries that appear to have been inflicted by weapons such as spears and swords.

Surrounding Danebury hillfort are many smaller farmsteads, between 1 ha (2.5 acres) and 2 ha (4.9 acres) in size. The fort was supplied with grain from the surrounding farmsteads, and could hold 20 times more food than the average farmstead, indicating that Danebury had a higher status than local farmsteads. This is further supported by the fact that the hillfort was used as a "central place" where people could gather to trade and store commodities. Periods of intensified activity in hillforts such as Danebury coinciding with depopulation of the surrounding landscape could indicate the increasing importance of hillforts in society, or that there were times of unrest when people would retreat to the relative safety of a hillfort's ramparts.

While other hillforts were abandoned in the 4th century BC, in about 400 BC Danebury grew into what is known as a "developed hillfort". It was possibly inhabited by a king or chieftain and his family, retinue, and craftsmen, and may have housed a population of 200–350. There are traces of craft and industry on a large scale, and use of the site by a social elite is indicated by the presence of shrines in the centre of the fort.

== Meteorite ==
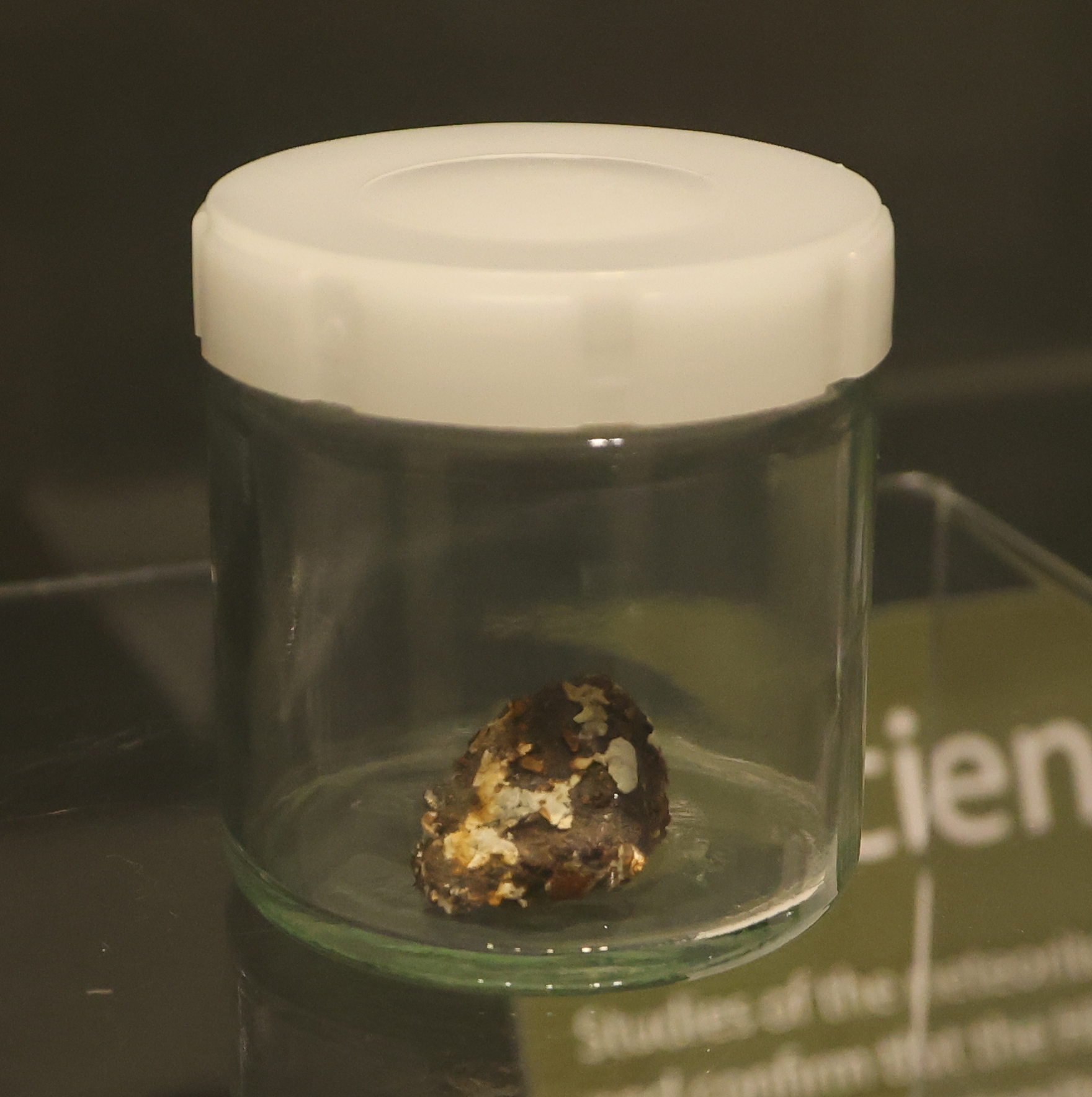
The Danebury meteorite

The Danebury meteorite is an H5 ordinary chondrite meteorite found in 1974 during the excavation of a grain pit at the hillfort. Originally classified as a lump of slag, it was identified as a meteorite about a decade later. It was found in a grain pit between two layers of infill with no particular evidence of it having been placed there, so it may have fallen directly into the pit. Carbon dating produced a date of 748–230 BC. (Note: With an uncalibrated date of 2350 ± 120yr BP)

The meteorite was originally held by Oxford University but in 2014 was transferred to the Hampshire County Council Arts and Museums Service.

== See also ==
- Hillforts in Britain
- List of hillforts in England
