= Riddlesworth (horse) =

British-bred Thoroughbred racehorse

- Sire: Emilius
- Grandsire: Orville
- Dam: Fillagree
- Damsire: Soothsayer
- Sex: Stallion
- Foaled: 1828
- Country: Great Britain
- Colour: Chestnut
- Breeder: 5th Earl of Jersey
- Owner: 5th Earl of Jersey; Sir Mark Wood; Dr. John Nott
- Trainer: James Edwards
- Record: 5: 4-1-0
- Earnings: 4640 gs

Major wins
- Riddlesworth Stakes (1831); Dinner Stakes (1831); 2000 Guineas Stakes (1831); Newmarket Stakes (1831)

Riddlesworth (1828–1843) was a British Thoroughbred racehorse. He raced in April and May 1831, in a career that lasted less than seven weeks. He won four of his five starts, including the Riddlesworth Stakes, 2000 Guineas Stakes and Newmarket Stakes. On his final start he finished second in the Derby. Riddlesworth was owned by George Child Villiers, 5th Earl of Jersey, and trained by James Edwards. As a stallion he stood in Germany and the United States, but didn't leave many notable foals.

== Background ==
Riddlesworth was a chestnut colt, with a white blaze, bred by George Child Villiers, 5th Earl of Jersey, and foaled in 1828. He was sired by Emilius, who had won the Riddlesworth Stakes and Derby Stakes in 1823. After retiring from racing Emilius became a successful stallion and was champion sire of Great Britain and Ireland in 1830 and 1831. Amongst his other offspring were Derby winners Priam and Plenipotentiary, St. Leger winner Mango, Oaks winner Oxygen and 1000 Guineas winners Preserve, Barcarolle and Extempore. Riddlesworth's dam Fillagree was a daughter of Soothsayer. She also foaled 1000 Guineas winner Charlotte West and 1000 Guineas and Oaks winner Cobweb. Riddlesworth was Fillagree's eighth foal. He was trained by James Edwards.

== Racing career ==
Riddlesworth started his racing career on 4 April 1831 in the Riddlesworth Stakes at the Newmarket Craven Meeting. He was ridden by George Edwards and started as the 1/2 favourite. He justified favouritism and won the race. Anthony was second and Egbert third. Three days later he beat Vestris to win the one-mile Dinner Stakes, this time being ridden by James Robinson. On 19 April only six horses started the 2000 Guineas Stakes at Newmarket. Riddlesworth was the 1/5 favourite, again was again ridden to victory by James Robinson. Sarpedeon finished second, with Bohemian third and Ciudad Rodrigo fourth. Three days later he faced seven rivals in the Newmarket Stakes. He was again sent off as the odds-on favourite and duly won. Incubus was second, three lengths behind Riddlesworth, and well clear of the rest of the field. On 19 May at Epsom Downs he started as the 4/6 favourite for the Derby Stakes. His closest rivals in the betting were Vestris at 12/1, Blunderer at 16/1 and Bras de Fer at 20/1. Twenty-three horses started the race, which was won by 50/1 outsider Spaniel. Riddlesworth finished second and was the only other horse placed. He was sold to Sir Mark Wood for 2500 guineas, at which point he was favourite for the St. Leger. On the 25 August it was reported that he was ill, and he drifted out to as big as 30/1 in the betting for the St. Leger. He never started again and retired having earned 4640 guineas in prize money during his career.

== Assessment ==
Riddlesworth was considered to be the best horse of his year. Commenting on some peoples suggestion that it was a "bad year for horses", one reporter for the Sporting Magazine wrote: "I, who am not a fashionable man, contend that it is the superiority of Riddlesworth that makes them only look so."

== Stud career ==
Riddlesworth was purchased by Sir Mark Wood and then exported to Germany in 1832. After being briefly brought back to England he was sold to Dr. John Nott and sent to Alabama in the United States. Riddlesworth's daughter Sally Riddlesworth was the direct female-line ancestor of King's Courier. King's Courier won the Doncaster Cup in 1900. Riddlesworth died in early 1843 at J.L Bradley's stable in Lexington, Kentucky of pneumonia.

== See also ==
- List of leading Thoroughbred racehorses

== Pedigree ==
Pedigree of Riddlesworth, chestnut stallion, 1828
Sire Emilius (GB) b. 1820	Orville (GB) b. 1799	Beningbrough b. 1791	King Fergus
Sire Emilius (GB) b. 1820	Orville (GB) b. 1799	Beningbrough b. 1791	Herod mare
Sire Emilius (GB) b. 1820	Orville (GB) b. 1799	Evelina br. 1791	Highflyer*^
Sire Emilius (GB) b. 1820	Orville (GB) b. 1799	Evelina br. 1791	Termagant
Sire Emilius (GB) b. 1820	Emily (GB); 1810	Stamford; 1794	Sir Peter Teazle^
Sire Emilius (GB) b. 1820	Emily (GB); 1810	Stamford; 1794	Horatia
Sire Emilius (GB) b. 1820	Emily (GB); 1810	Whiskey mare 1799	Whiskey
Sire Emilius (GB) b. 1820	Emily (GB); 1810	Whiskey mare 1799	Grey Dorimant
Dam Filagree (GB) ch. 1815	Soothsayer (GB) ch. 1808	Sorcerer bl. 1796	Trumpator*
Dam Filagree (GB) ch. 1815	Soothsayer (GB) ch. 1808	Sorcerer bl. 1796	Young Giantess
Dam Filagree (GB) ch. 1815	Soothsayer (GB) ch. 1808	Goldenlocks; 1793	Delpini^
Dam Filagree (GB) ch. 1815	Soothsayer (GB) ch. 1808	Goldenlocks; 1793	Violet
Dam Filagree (GB) ch. 1815	Web (GB) b. 1808	Waxy b. 1790	Pot-8-Os
Dam Filagree (GB) ch. 1815	Web (GB) b. 1808	Waxy b. 1790	Maria
Dam Filagree (GB) ch. 1815	Web (GB) b. 1808	Penelope b. 1798	Trumpator*
Dam Filagree (GB) ch. 1815	Web (GB) b. 1808	Penelope b. 1798	Prunella^

Note: b. = Bay, bl. = Black, br. = Brown, ch. = Chestnut

* Riddlesworth is inbred 4D x 4D to the stallion Trumpator, meaning that he appears fourth generation twice on the dam side of his pedigree.

*^ Riddlesworth is inbred 4S x 5S x 5D x 5D to the stallion Highflyer, meaning that he appears fourth generation once and fifth generation once (via Sir Peter Teazle)^ on the sire side of his pedigree and fifth generation twice (via Delpini and Prunella)^ on the dam side of his pedigree.
