= Barcarolle (horse) =

British-bred Thoroughbred racehorse

- Sire: Emilius
- Grandsire: Orville
- Dam: Bravura
- Damsire: Outcry
- Sex: Mare
- Foaled: 1835
- Country: United Kingdom
- Colour: Bay
- Breeder: William Keppel, 4th Earl of Albemarle
- Owner: 4th Earl of Albemarle
- Trainer: W Edwards
- Record: 7: 2-2-1

Major wins
- 1000 Guineas (1838); Woburn Stakes (1839)

Barcarolle (1835 – 1849) was a British Thoroughbred racehorse and broodmare who won the classic 1000 Guineas at Newmarket Racecourse in 1838. In a racing career which lasted from April 1838 until September 1839, the filly ran seven times and won twice. Unraced as a two-year-old Barcarolle won the Guineas on her second appearance of 1838 but contracted an illness and raced only once more that season. After winning one minor race from four starts in 1839, she was retired from racing and exported to Russia in the following year.

== Background ==
Barcarolle was a bay mare bred at Quidenham in Norfolk by her owner William Keppel, 4th Earl of Albemarle. She was the ninth foal of Bravura, a successful racemare who won seven times in 1824. Barcarolle was the only classic winner produced by Thoroughbred family 45.

Barcarolle's sire, Emilius, won the Derby in 1823 and went on to become a successful stallion at the Riddlesworth stud which was owned and run by Thomas Thornhill. Emilius’s best winners included Priam, Plenipotentiary, Oxygen, Preserve, Riddlesworth (2000 Guineas) and Mango (St Leger) and he was British Champion sire in 1830 and 1831.

== Racing career ==
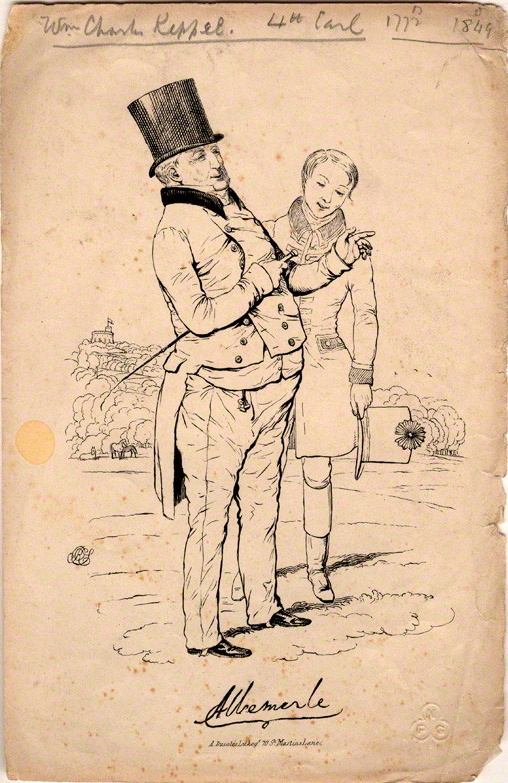
The Earl of Albemarle, who bred and owned Barcarolle

=== 1838: three-year-old season ===
Barcarolle made her first racecourse appearance on 20 April at the Newmarket Craven meeting where she contested a Sweepstakes restricted to horses owned by "Members of the Coffee-room". The weather at meeting was unusually cold, with rain, sleet, snow and strong winds. She started the outsider of the three runners for the race over the Rowley Mile course and finished second to Mr Batson's filly Vespertilio. On 3 May Barcarolle, ridden by Edward Edwards, was one of six fillies, from an original entry of twenty-two, to contest the 1000 Guineas over the Ditch Mile course. She started second favourite at odds of 4/1 and won from Lord Exeter's fillies Mecca and Romania. Barcarolle was considered a serious contender for The Oaks after her win at Newmarket, but was ruled out of the race when she fell victim to the outbreak of "coughs and inflammatory sore throats" which affected many leading horses that spring.

After a break of five months, Barcarolle returned to action at the Newmarket First October meeting. In the Grand Duke Michael Stakes over ten furlongs she finished third of the five runners behind the 2000 Guineas winner Grey Momus.

=== 1839: four-year-old season ===
Barcarolle returned as a four-year-old on 1 April at the opening day of the Craven meeting. In the Craven Stakes over ten furlongs she finished unplaced behind Mr Rayner's colt Quo Minus. She was also engaged in a handicap race on the same day but was withdrawn by her owner. At Royal Ascot on 29 May she was beaten by her only opponent, a colt named Ion, in the Swinley Stakes over one and a half miles, and then finished unplaced in the Grand Stand Plate two days later.

On 25 September, seventeen months after her last success, Barcarolle contested the Woburn Stakes at Bedford Racecourse. The race was scheduled in a series of heats, with the prize going to the first horse to win twice. Ridden as in the Guineas by Edwards, Barcarolle settled the race by winning the first and second heats.

== Stud record ==
Barcarolle was retired from racing to become a broodmare, but produced no foals in Britain as she was sold and exported to Russia in 1840. Barcarolle died in Russia in 1849.

== Pedigree ==
Pedigree of Barcarolle (GB), bay mare, 1835
| Sire Emilius (GB) 1820 | Orville; 1799 | Beningbrough | King Fergus |
| Sire Emilius (GB) 1820 | Orville; 1799 | Beningbrough | Fenwick's Herod mare |
| Sire Emilius (GB) 1820 | Orville; 1799 | Evelina | Highflyer |
| Sire Emilius (GB) 1820 | Orville; 1799 | Evelina | Termagant |
| Sire Emilius (GB) 1820 | Emily; 1810 | Stamford | Sir Peter Teazle |
| Sire Emilius (GB) 1820 | Emily; 1810 | Stamford | Horatia |
| Sire Emilius (GB) 1820 | Emily; 1810 | Whiskey mare | Whiskey |
| Sire Emilius (GB) 1820 | Emily; 1810 | Whiskey mare | Grey Dorimant |
| Dam Bravura (GB) 1821 | Outcry; 1811 | Camillus | Hambletonian |
| Dam Bravura (GB) 1821 | Outcry; 1811 | Camillus | Faith |
| Dam Bravura (GB) 1821 | Outcry; 1811 | Waxy mare | Waxy |
| Dam Bravura (GB) 1821 | Outcry; 1811 | Waxy mare | Mother Shipton |
| Dam Bravura (GB) 1821 | Prodigious; 1814 | Caleb Quotem | Sir Peter Teazle |
| Dam Bravura (GB) 1821 | Prodigious; 1814 | Caleb Quotem | Diomed mare |
| Dam Bravura (GB) 1821 | Prodigious; 1814 | Fair Forester | Alexander |
| Dam Bravura (GB) 1821 | Prodigious; 1814 | Fair Forester | sister 1 to Old England (Family:45) |
