= 1830 in sports =

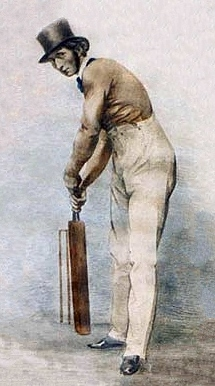
Leading English batsman Fuller Pilch

1830 in sports describes the year's events in world sport.

== Boxing ==
Events

- Simon Byrne retains his English championship but no fights involving him are recorded in 1830.

== Cricket ==
Events

- No-balls are shown separately on the scorecard for the first time.

England

- Most runs – Fuller Pilch 235 @ 29.37 (HS 70*)
- Most wickets – Jem Broadbridge 27 (BB 5–?)

== Curling ==
- Establishment of the Orchard Lake Curling Club at Orchard Lake, Michigan; it is the first curling club in the United States and uses hickory block stones

== Horse racing ==
England

- 1,000 Guineas Stakes – Charlotte West
- 2,000 Guineas Stakes – Augustus
- The Derby – Priam
- The Oaks – Variation
- St. Leger Stakes – Birmingham

== Rowing ==
Events

- 10 August — the Wingfield Sculls, amateur championship of the River Thames, is founded at the instigation of barrister Henry Colsell Wingfield and raced from Battersea to Hammersmith.

The Boat Race

- The Oxford and Cambridge Boat Race is not held this year

== Bibliography ==
- Rowland Bowen, Cricket: A History of its Growth and Development, Eyre & Spottiswoode, 1970
