= 1831 in sports =

1831 in sports describes the year's events in world sport.

== Boxing ==
Events

- 12 July — having failed to fight him in 1829, Jem Ward finally meets Simon Byrne and wins controversially in the 33rd round. Ward reclaims the English Championship.

== Cricket ==
Events

- This season sees Kent wicket-keeper Ned Wenman rise to prominence, though initially as a batsman.

England

- Most runs – Ned Wenman 144 @ 16.00 (HS 35)
- Most wickets – William Lillywhite 40 (BB 7–?)

== Horse racing ==
England

- 1,000 Guineas Stakes – Galantine
- 2,000 Guineas Stakes – Riddlesworth
- The Derby – Spaniel
- The Oaks – Oxygen
- St. Leger Stakes – Chorister

== Rowing ==
Events

- C. Campbell and J. Williams compete for the first English professional sculling championship in London

The Boat Race

- The Oxford and Cambridge Boat Race is not held this year
