= Mango (horse) =

British Thoroughbred racehorse

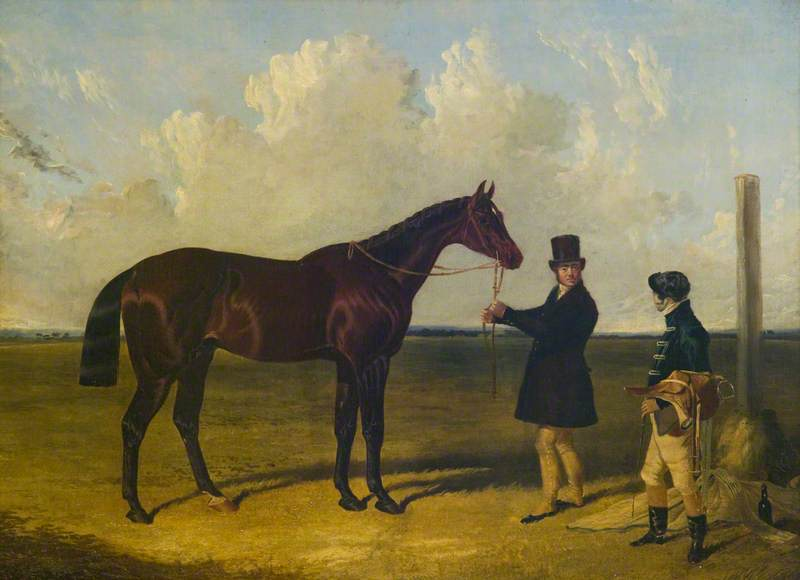
- 'Mango', Winner of the St Leger, 1837 by John Frederick Herring
- Sire: Emilius
- Grandsire: Orville
- Dam: Mustard
- Damsire: Merlin
- Sex: Stallion
- Foaled: 1834
- Country: United Kingdom
- Colour: Brown
- Breeder: Thomas Thornhill or Charles Greville
- Owner: Charles Greville
- Trainer: Richard Prince; Montgomery Dilly
- Record: 13: 9-2-0

Major wins
- Ascot Derby (1837); Match against Wisdom (1837); Great St Leger Stakes (1837); Newmarket St Leger (1837); Claret Stakes (1838)

Mango (foaled 1834) was a British Thoroughbred racehorse and sire best known for winning the classic St Leger Stakes in 1837. He won nine of his thirteen races in a racing career which lasted from October 1836 until October 1838. Mango was well-beaten in his only race as a two-year-old and finished unplaced in The Derby but won three races at Royal Ascot in June. In September he won an exceptionally rough race for the St Leger at Doncaster Racecourse and then won the Newmarket equivalent a month later. Mango won twice in the following year, but became increasingly temperamental and difficult to manage. He was retired to stud at the end of 1838 but proved a failure as a sire.

== Background ==
Mango was a powerfully-built, dark-coated brown horse with a small white star who stood 15 hands, three and a half inches high. According to the New Sporting Magazine he was an honest, but lazy horse who required "considerable exertion on the part of his jockey" to show his best form. According to the General Stud Book he was bred by Charles Greville although other sources state that he was bred by Thomas Thornhill and then sold to Greville.

Mango's sire, Emilius, won the Derby in 1823 and went on to become a successful stallion at the Riddlesworth stud which was owned and run by Thomas Thornhill. Apart from Preserve, Emilius's best winners included Priam, Plenipotentiary, Oxygen, Riddlesworth (2000 Guineas) and Preserve: he was British Champion sire in 1830 and 1831.

Mango's dam Mustard, a daughter of the Oaks winner Morel was bred and owned by Thornhill. She showed some racing ability, finishing third in the Prendergast Stakes as a two-year-old, before becoming a successful broodmare. In addition to Mango, her fifth foal, she produced his full-sister Preserve, and is regarded as the Foundation mare of Thoroughbred family 1-c.

Mango was originally trained at Newmarket, Suffolk by Richard Prince, but later moved to the stable of Montgomery Dilly.

== Racing career ==
=== 1836: two-year-old season ===
Mango made his first racecourse appearance in the Clearwell Stakes at Newmarket on 18 October. He was not among the favourites and finished unplaced behind Colonel Peel's chestnut filly who won from the future 1000 Guineas winner Chapeau d'Espagne.

=== 1837: three-year-old season ===
On 11 April 1837, Mango was scheduled to begin his second season in a sweepstakes over Newmarket's Ditch Mile course. When the other horses were withdrawn by their owners however, Mango was allowed to walk over the course to claim the prize. On 25 May, Mango was one of seventeen runners to contest the fifty-eighth running of the Derby Stakes at Epsom Downs Racecourse. Despite the fact that he had finished unplaced in his only competitive race, Mango was strongly supported in the betting and started the 11/2 third favourite but finished unplaced behind the 40/1 outsider Phosphorus.

On 6 June Mango was matched against Chapeau d'Espagne in the Ascot Derby. He started the 6/4 favourite, took the lead after a mile and won by a length won from Edgar, with the 1000 Guineas winner in third place. Later the same day, Mango won a plate donated by the King when he defeated Velure, a filly owned by Lord Exeter Two days later, Mango won his third race of the meeting when he beat Rat-Trap in a sweepstakes over the Old Mile course. On 30 June he appeared at Stockbridge Racecourse where he defeated Wisdom in a one and a half mile match.

On 19 September Mango, ridden by the teenager Sam Day, was one of thirteen three-year-olds to contest the Great St Leger Stakes at Doncaster Racecourse. He started the 13/2 fourth choice in the betting behind Epirus, Mahometan and Cardinal Puff. The race appears to have been an eventful one. Shortly after the start Epirus slipped and fell into a ditch at the side of the course, seriously injuring his jockey Bill Scott, who suffered a compound fracture of the collar bone. Sam Day tracked the leaders on Mango, but approaching the final furlong he seemed unlikely to figure in the finish when a greyhound ran onto the course, impeding two of the leaders. In the closing stages, Mango was driven through a gap in the leading rank, settled the race in three strides and won by a length Mr Fairlie's colt Abraham Newland. The result was enthusiastically received by the large and unruly crowd. Both Greville and his associate Lord George Bentinck were reported to have won £10,000 on the race.

Fifteen days after his classic victory, Mango (having returned from Yorkshire in a horse-drawn "van") started 4/6 favourite for Newmarket's version of the St Leger, despite having sustained a minor injury a few days before the race. Ridden by John Barham Day he appeared beaten in the closing stages but produced a strong finish to win by half a length from Troilus, with Rat-trap third and Dardanelles fourth. The forty-four-year-old Day was reported to be "dreadfully exhausted by his exertions" on the winner. After the race there were insinuations that Mango's connections had exaggerated the severity of his injury in order to obtain better odds, but nothing was proved. Mango's run of six consecutive wins came to an end at the next Newmarket meeting when he failed to concede fourteen pounds to Velure in the Garden Stakes. On the same day, Greville received a forfeit when Mr Greatrex's colt failed to appear for a 300 guinea match against Mango over the five furlongs.

=== 1838: four-year-old season ===
Mango began his four-year-old season at the Craven meeting in April when his owner received a 100 guinea forfeit as George Osbaldeston's Mahometan failed to appear for a two-mile match. Three days later at the same meeting Mango won the Claret Stakes, easily beating Hibiscus, his only opponent, by three lengths. At the next Newmarket meeting Mango won a sweepstakes over the four-mile Beacon Course, but again gave John Barham Day a difficult time, dodging, swerving and "rebeling" against the jockey before winning by two lengths. Later at the same meering he failed to appear for a match against Velure, leaving Greville to pay a 150 guinea forfeit. After a break of five months, Mango returned to action at the First October meeting but he failed to add to his successes, being beaten by Lord Suffield's mare Arsenic in a five furlong match. He was entered in a match against Lord Suffield's Caravan at the Second October meeting, but was withdrawn by Greville and retired to stud.

== Stud record ==
Mango began his career as a breeding stallion at Hampton Court Paddocks where he stood at a fee of 11 guineas a mare. Mango's stud record was very disappointing as he sired no major winners and few horses of any consequence. One of his sons, Portumnus, won three races for Greville at Newmarket in 1843, but two of these were walkovers.

== Pedigree ==
Pedigree of Mango (GB), brown stallion, 1834
Sire Emilius (GB) 1820	Orville; 1799	Beningbrough	King Fergus*^
Sire Emilius (GB) 1820	Orville; 1799	Beningbrough	Fenwick's Herod mare
Sire Emilius (GB) 1820	Orville; 1799	Evelina	Highflyer*^
Sire Emilius (GB) 1820	Orville; 1799	Evelina	Termagant
Sire Emilius (GB) 1820	Emily; 1810	Stamford	Sir Peter Teazle^
Sire Emilius (GB) 1820	Emily; 1810	Stamford	Horatia
Sire Emilius (GB) 1820	Emily; 1810	Whiskey mare	Whiskey
Sire Emilius (GB) 1820	Emily; 1810	Whiskey mare	Grey Dorimant
Dam Mustard (GB) 1824	Merlin; 1815	Castrel	Buzzard*
Dam Mustard (GB) 1824	Merlin; 1815	Castrel	Alexander mare^
Dam Mustard (GB) 1824	Merlin; 1815	Miss Newton	Delpini^
Dam Mustard (GB) 1824	Merlin; 1815	Miss Newton	Tipple Cyder^
Dam Mustard (GB) 1824	Morel; 1805	Sorcerer	Trumpator
Dam Mustard (GB) 1824	Morel; 1805	Sorcerer	Young Giantess
Dam Mustard (GB) 1824	Morel; 1805	Hornby Lass	Buzzard*
Dam Mustard (GB) 1824	Morel; 1805	Hornby Lass	Puzzle (Family:1-c)

* Mango is inbred 4D x 4D to the stallion Buzzard, meaning that he appears fourth generation twice on the dam side of his pedigree.

*^ Mango is inbred 4S x 5S x 6D x 5D to the stallion Highflyer, meaning that he appears fourth generation once and fifth generation once (via Sir Peter Teazle)^ on the sire side of his pedigree and sixth generation once (via Alexander mare)^ and fifth generation once (via Delpini)^ on the dam side of his pedigree.

*^ Mango is inbred 4S x 5D to the stallion King Fergus, meaning that he appears fourth generation on the sire side of his pedigree and fifth generation (via Tipple Cyder)^ on the dam side of his pedigree.
