= 1838 in sports =

1838 in sports describes the year's events in world sport.

== Boxing ==
Events

- 3 April — in his return fight with Ben Caunt, William "Bendigo" Thompson is disqualified in the 75th round for going down without being struck.
- Caunt claims the English Championship after defeating Bendigo but is not recognised because of the prior claim of James Burke, who has now returned to England from America; meanwhile, Jem Ward continues his refusal to formally surrender the title even though he has long retired.
- Publication of the London Prize Ring Rules of 1838 which succeed and are built upon the Broughton Rules of 1743.

== Cricket ==
Events

- Melbourne Cricket Club is founded; it is generally regarded as the oldest sporting club in Australia

England

- Most runs – Charles Taylor 339 @ 16.95 (HS 73)
- Most wickets – James Cobbett 71 (BB 8–?)

== Football ==
Events

- A pupil at Rugby School called Jem Mackie is noted for his "running in" ability and this is understood to be the equivalent of try scoring, which is evidence of a distinct handling game.

== Horse racing ==
England

- Grand National – Sir William
- 1,000 Guineas Stakes – Barcarolle
- 2,000 Guineas Stakes – Grey Momus
- The Derby – Amato
- The Oaks – Industry
- St. Leger Stakes – Don John

== Rowing ==
The Boat Race

- The Oxford and Cambridge Boat Race is not held this year

Other

- In the U.S. six men of Providence, Rhode Island establish the Narragansett Boat Club on the tidal Seekonk River.
