= Galantine (horse) =

British-bred Thoroughbred racehorse

- Sire: Reveller
- Grandsire: Comus
- Dam: Snowdrop
- Damsire: Highland Fling
- Sex: Mare
- Foaled: 1828
- Country: United Kingdom
- Colour: Bay
- Breeder: Sir Mark Wood, 1st Baronet
- Owner: Sir Mark Wood, 2nd Baronet
- Trainer: H. Scott
- Record: 11:4-2-1

Major wins
- 1000 Guineas (1831)

Galantine (1828–1847) was a British Thoroughbred racehorse and broodmare who won the eighteenth running of the classic 1000 Guineas at Newmarket Racecourse in 1831. Running exclusively at Newmarket, the filly ran eleven times and won four races in a racing career which lasted from April 1830 until May 1831. After being beaten in both her races as a two-year-old, Galantine won a controversial race for the 1000 Guineas on her three-year-old debut, beating the odds-on favourite Oxygen. Although she was considered a lucky and sub-standard classic winner, Galantine went on to win three match races at before the end of the season. She was retired from racing after two unsuccessful runs in 1832.

== Background ==
Galantine was a bay mare bred by Sir Mark Wood, 1st Baronet the Member of Parliament for Gatton and owned during her racing career by his son and successor Sir Mark Wood, 2nd Baronet. She was sired by Reveller, a Yorkshire champion whose wins included the St Leger Stakes in 1818 and many other long-distance races on Northern courses. Galantine was his only classic winner, but he sired Mark Wood's Ascot Gold Cup winner Lucetta as well as The Mummer (July Stakes) and Ascot (St. James's Palace Stakes).

Galantine was the last recorded foal of Snowdrop, a daughter of Daisy who was a half sister of the St Leger winner Ambrosio. Snowdrop had previously produced Calendulae, a broodmare whose descendants included The Derby winner Pyrrhus the First.

== Racing career ==
=== 1830: two-year-old season ===
Until 1913, there was no requirement for British racehorses to have official names and the filly who would become Galantine raced unnamed in 1830. In the early 19th century most horses began their careers at the age of three and there were relatively few races for two-year-olds. One of the most important events for juveniles was the Clearwell Stakes at the Newmarket Second October meeting, in which Galantine (officially Sir M. Wood's b. f. by Reveller, out of Snowdrop) made her first racecourse appearance. She started at odds of 10/1 and finished unplaced behind the favourite Oxygen. Three days later "the Snowdrop filly" ran in the meeting's other major two-year-old race, the Prendergast Stakes. She showed improved form, finishing third to the colt Zany, who had beaten Oxygen in the July Stakes.

=== 1831: three-year-old season ===
On her first appearance as a three-year-old, Mark Wood's filly, now officially named Galantine, was one of eight fillies to contest the 1000 Guineas on 21 April. She started at odds of 10/1 whereas Oxygen was made the 2/5 favourite for the race over the Ditch Mile course. The race was run at an extremely slow pace before developing into a sprint over the final furlong. Galantine, ridden by Patrick Conolly, had been among the leaders from the start, and held on to win by a neck from Mr Scott Stonehewer's filly Lioness, with Oxygen unplaced. The Sporting Magazine criticised the "stupid" tactics of the jockeys and described Galantine as "a paltry, scratching thing" at least a stone inferior to Oxygen at her best. On the following day, Galantine was tried against colts in the Newmarket Stakes over the same course and distance and finished unplaced behind the 2000 Guineas winner Riddlesworth. At the next meeting on 5 May Galantine ran a match race against Captain Rous's colt Crutch over the Ditch Mile. Carrying five pounds less than her opponent, Galantine was favoured in the betting and won by a length "with the greatest ease" to claim a prize of 200 guineas. Attendance at this meeting was unusually poor as many of the leading Turf figures where involved in the ongoing general election.

After a break of almost five months, Galantine returned to action for the autumn meetings at Newmarket, where she was entered in six races. On 3 October she was made favourite for a £100 Sweepstakes, but was beaten by her only rival, a colt named Lochinvar. Two weeks later she earned £100 for her owner without having to compete when her opponent, a colt owned by Lord Jersey, was withdrawn from a scheduled match race. Four days later she won a £100 match against Lord Chesterfield's Titania over the Ditch Mile and then finished unplaced in a five furlong handicap race later the same afternoon. On 2 November Galantine won another match, this time beating Lord Orford's colt The Grand Duke over the Rowley Mile for a prize of £100. On the final day of the Newmarket season, Galantine collected a further £100 when Thomas Thornhill's colt Earwig was withdrawn from a match race over the four mile Beacon Course.

=== 1832: four-year-old season ===
Galantine remained in training as a four-year-old but failed to win. On 25 April at the Craven meeting she ran a second match against Titania, but on this occasion she was defeated by Lord Chesterfield'd filly. Two days later she finished unplaced behind Lord Lowther's filly Scuffle in an all-aged claiming race over the Ditch Mile. Galantine was withdrawn from a match against Lioness at the next Newmarket meeting and never raced again.

== Stud record ==
Galantine was retired from racing to become a broodmare. In 1832 she was sold and exported to Germany. She died in 1847.

== Pedigree ==
Pedigree of Galantine (GB), bay mare, 1828
| Sire Reveller (GB) 1815 | Comus; 1809 | Sorcerer | Trumpator |
| Sire Reveller (GB) 1815 | Comus; 1809 | Sorcerer | Young Giantess |
| Sire Reveller (GB) 1815 | Comus; 1809 | Houghton Lass | Sir Peter Teazle |
| Sire Reveller (GB) 1815 | Comus; 1809 | Houghton Lass | Alexina |
| Sire Reveller (GB) 1815 | Rosette; 1803 | Beningbrough | King Fergus |
| Sire Reveller (GB) 1815 | Rosette; 1803 | Beningbrough | Fenwick's Herod mare |
| Sire Reveller (GB) 1815 | Rosette; 1803 | Rosamond | Tandem |
| Sire Reveller (GB) 1815 | Rosette; 1803 | Rosamond | Tuberose |
| Dam Snowdrop (GB) 1806 | Highland Fling; 1798 | Spadille | Highflyer |
| Dam Snowdrop (GB) 1806 | Highland Fling; 1798 | Spadille | Flora |
| Dam Snowdrop (GB) 1806 | Highland Fling; 1798 | Caelia | Herod |
| Dam Snowdrop (GB) 1806 | Highland Fling; 1798 | Caelia | Proserpine |
| Dam Snowdrop (GB) 1806 | Daisy; 1798 | Buzzard | Woodpecker |
| Dam Snowdrop (GB) 1806 | Daisy; 1798 | Buzzard | Misfortume |
| Dam Snowdrop (GB) 1806 | Daisy; 1798 | Tulip | Damper |
| Dam Snowdrop (GB) 1806 | Daisy; 1798 | Tulip | Eclipse mare (Family 3-a) |
