= Patrick Conolly =

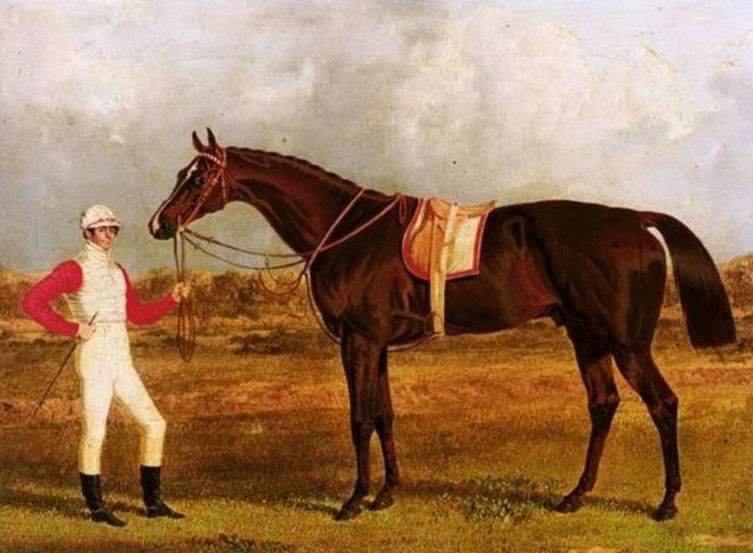
- Euclid, A Chestnut Racehorse Held By His Jockey Patrick Conolly In A Landscape by John Frederick Herring

Personal information
- Born: 1806 possibly Naas, Ireland
- Died: 1842 (aged 35–36) Newmarket, Suffolk
- Resting place: All Saints Church, Newmarket; 52.242962°N 0.406957°E
- Occupation: Jockey

Horse racing career
- Sport: Horse racing

Major racing wins
- Major races 1,000 Guineas Stakes (1831); 2,000 Guineas Stakes (1830); Epsom Derby (1834, 1841); Epsom Oaks (1832); St Leger (1830)

Significant horses
- Augustus, Birmingham, Coronation, Galantine, Galata, Plenipotentiary

Patrick Conolly (1806 - 1842) was an Irish jockey, who won each of the British Classics at least once in his career. His career was cut short by early death through illness, not long after his second Derby victory.

== Early life ==
Conolly is reputed to have been born in County Kildare, possibly in Naas in 1806, although no baptismal record has been found. Racing would run in the family. His brother-in-law, Arthur Pavis, was a jockey, and his nephew, John Conolly (1858–1896), would also become a successful jockey in Ireland.

Around 1817, Conolly became apprentice to William Cleary, trainer to Michael Prendergast MP. He made his debut riding a horse called Jemmy Gay at The Curragh in 1819.

== Career ==
In 1821, Prendergast brought him to England. While in England, and through his links to Prendergast, he also received the patronage of Lord Exeter, Lord Chesterfield and Lord Verulam among others. Prendergast's own horses were trained by Henry Neale. Conolly's career took off when he won the Chelmsford Gold Cup on the Neale-trained Vaurien, owned by Lord Verulam. This began a lasting partnership between the three.

On 7 March 1831, Conolly rode Lord Verulam's horse Albert in a trial on Newmarket Heath. The horse was a particular favourite of Verulam's, having won each of its first five races, and he rose early to attend. Albert led the group at a good pace, until suffering a catastrophic burst blood vessel, and, to quote Conolly, 'the life of the horse became instantaneously extinct.' Lord Verulam was so affected by the loss that he erected a memorial plaque in his name.

Conolly's most celebrated equine partnership came with the highly rated Plenipotentiary, the horse on which he won his first Derby in 1834. Having beaten a field of 22 in that race, the colt was also widely expected to follow up in the St. Leger. However, on the day, the horse's appearance immediately caused consternation among racegoers. Rumours soon circulated that the horse had been interfered with, a situation made more likely by the lax security at the racecourse stables. On the way to the start, Plenipotentiary moved slowly and gamblers rushed to salvage their bets. Conolly reported that the colt felt dead beneath him during the race, and he ran terribly, despite all efforts. It would be his only defeat.

Conolly would have another near success in the St. Leger. In 1839, his horse Euclid dead-heated with Charles the Twelfth for the race, the first time this had ever happened. Both owners agreed to a run-off, with Charles the Twelfth prevailing by a head.

On 26 May 1841, Conolly would win a second Derby on Coronation. The horse was backed down from 10/1 to 4/1 favourite just before the off, and, shortly after entering the straight, Conolly sent the horse on for an easy three-length victory. Celebrations were cut short though. As the crowd mobbed the horse in the unsaddling enclosure, he panicked and kicked out, catching a bystander full in the face and killing him.

== Racing style and character ==
Conolly was an even-tempered, safe jockey who didn't take chances.

In 1835, the Sporting Magazine said of him, 'he has a smile that relates the history of his heart. Long as he has been absent from his country, his accent still adheres to him...and he is not ashamed of it.'

== Personal life ==
On 9 February 1836 Conolly married Elizabeth Boyce in the parish church of Woodditton near Newmarket. The couple had two daughters, Ellen and Mary Anne, and a son, Frank. Conolly also had a son from a previous relationship with Michael Prendergast's niece, Ellen Ricketts. The son went to Australia, took the name of Matthew St Leon and founded a dynasty of circus riders.

== Death ==
In the winter of 1841, Conolly fell violently sick. After a 'long and painful illness', he died at Newmarket on the afternoon of Saturday 9 April 1842. Conolly is buried on the east side of All Saints' Church, close to the east entrance. Today, the headstone of his grave lies flat and is virtually illegible.

== Major wins ==
(United Kingdom) Great Britain

- 1,000 Guineas Stakes - Galantine (1831)
- 2,000 Guineas Stakes - Augustus (1830)
- Epsom Derby - (2) - Plenipotentiary (1834), Coronation (1841)
- Epsom Oaks - Galata (1832)
- St Leger - Birmingham (1830)
