= Firdaussi =

British Thoroughbred racehorse

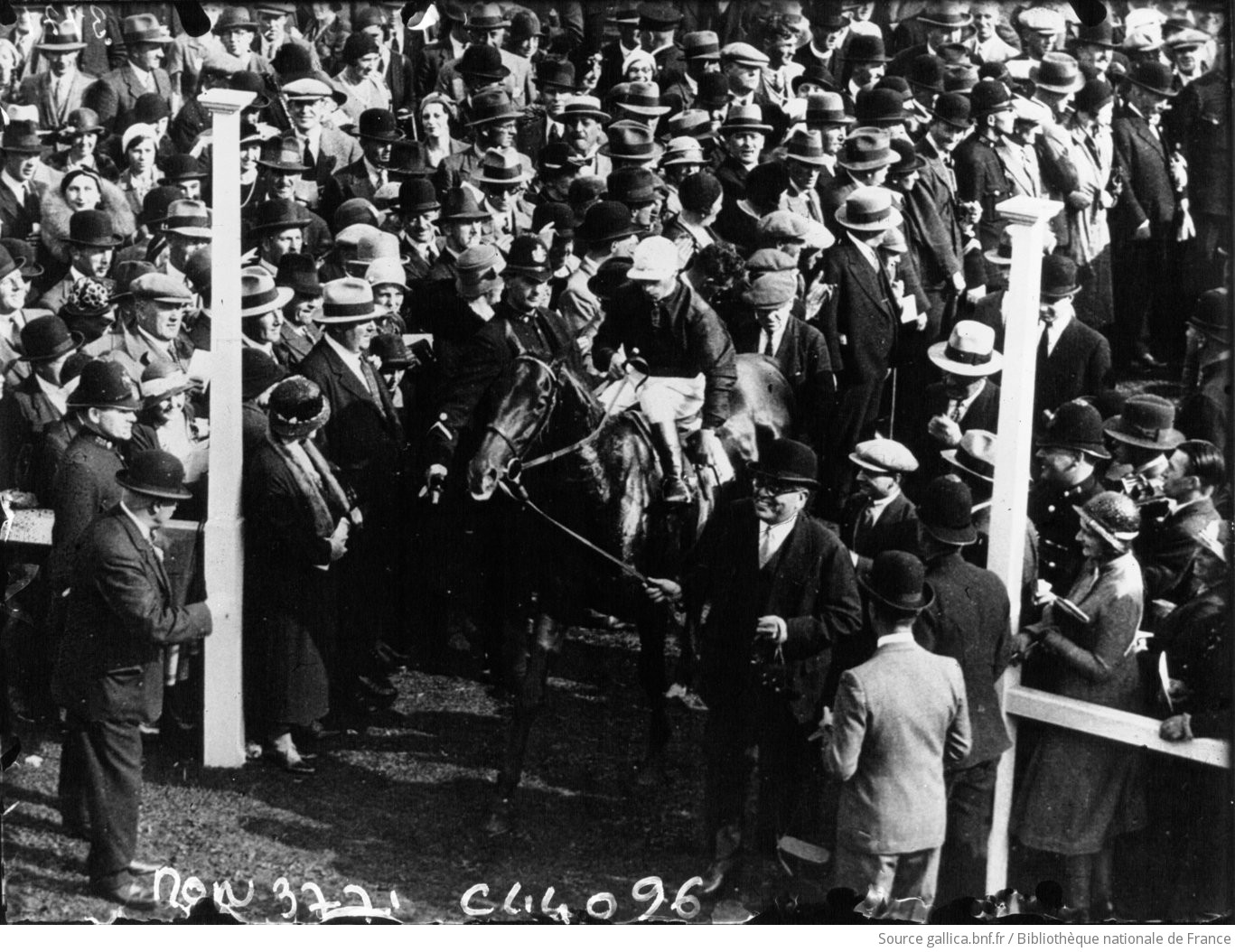
- St Leger (7 Sep 1932, Doncaster)
- Sire: Pharos
- Grandsire: Phalaris
- Dam: Brownhylda
- Damsire: Stedfast
- Sex: Stallion
- Foaled: 1929
- Country: United Kingdom
- Colour: Chestnut
- Breeder: Aga Khan III
- Owner: Aga Khan III
- Trainer: Dick Dawson; Frank Butters
- Record: 21: 8-5-3
- Earnings: £21,550

Major wins
- Dewhurst Stakes (1931); Gordon Stakes (1932); St Leger (1932); Jockey Club Stakes (1932); John Porter Stakes (1933 dsq)

Awards
- Biggest prize-money winner in Britain (1932)

Firdaussi (1929 – after 1944) was a British Thoroughbred racehorse and sire. He showed very good form as a two-year-old in 1931 when he won three of his five races including the Dewhurst Stakes. In the following year his progress was interrupted by illness in spring but he won his last four races, taking the Gordon Stakes before recording his biggest win in the St Leger Stakes and then defeating top-class older horses in the Jockey Club Stakes. He ran consistently as a four-year-old in 1933 but won only one minor race. Apart from his victories, Firdaussi was placed in the Eclipse Stakes (twice), Greenham Stakes, Lingfield Derby Trial and Great Jubilee Handicap. After his retirement from racing Firdaussi stood as a breeding stallion in Britain, France and Ireland, but had limited success as a sire of winners.

== Background ==
Firdaussi was a "big, lusty", strongly made chestnut horse, bred and owned by the Aga Khan. He was sent into training with Richard Dawson at his Whatcombe stables near Wantage in Oxfordshire.

His sire Pharos was a top-class racehorse who won the Champion Stakes but was even more successful at stud, where he sired Pharis, Nearco and Cameronian. Firdaussi's dam Brownhylda won the Epsom Oaks in 1923 and was bought by the Aga Khan at the end of her racing career. Brownhylda's dam Valkyrie, was distantly descended from the influential broodmare Preserve.

== Racing career ==
=== 1931: two-year-old season ===
Firdaussi began his track career in July when he won the Fulbourne Stakes over five furlongs at Newmarket Racecourse in July. At Doncaster Racecourse he finished third in a Rous Memorial Plate and then returned to winning form to take the Autumn Foal Plate at Newbury in very impressive style. In the seven furlong Dewhurst Stakes at Newmarket in October he started the 11/10 favourite and won from Short Hand. The colt ended his first season at Hurst Park where he ran second to the gelding Old Riley in the £1,550 Great Two-Year-Old Stakes over six furlongs.

Following a rift between the Aga Khan and Dick Dawson, Firdaussi was moved to Frank Butters' Fitzroy House stable in Newmarket, Suffolk In the Free Handicap, a ranking of the best juveniles in Britain, he was assigned a weight of 126 pounds, making him the fourth-best colt of his generation behind Orwell, Mannamead and the Coventry Stakes winner Cockpen. He earned £3,340 in 1931.

=== 1932: three-year-old season ===
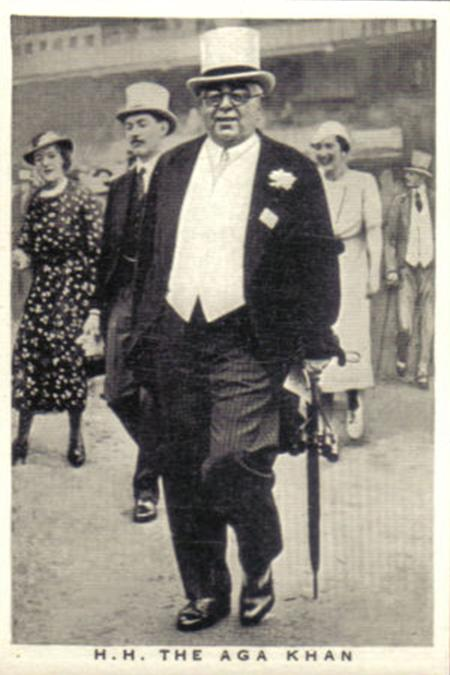
Aga Khan III, who bred and owned Firdaussi

On his three-year-old debut contested the Greenham Stakes (a trial race for the 2000 Guineas) at Newbury and finished third to Orwell, the leading two-year-old of 1931. The colt then developed a respiratory infection and missed his intended run in the Guineas. He returned in the one and a half mile Lingfield Derby Trial in which he was reportedly some way short of full health but finished second to April the Fifth. In the Epsom Derby on 1 June he was ridden by Steve Donoghue as his usual jockey, Michael Beary, opted to ride the stable's other runner Dastur. After being among the leaders for most of the way Firdaussi took the lead in the straight but was outpaced in the final furlong and came home fifth of the twenty-one runners behind April the Fifth, Dastur, Miracle and Royal Dancer.

At Royal Ascot the colt was matched against older horses in the Hardwicke Stakes and finished fourth behind the four-year-old Limelight. In the ten furlong Eclipse Stakes at Sandown Park in July he ran third behind Miracle and the four-year-old Goyescas. At Goodwood Racecourse later that month he started 4/6 favourite for the Gordon Stakes and recorded his first win of the season. He followed up at York Racecourse on 24 August, taking the Duke of York Handicap by one and a half lengths from Colorado Kid, but did not look particularly impressive.

On 7 of September at Doncaster Racecourse Firdaussi, ridden by Freddie Fox, started at odds of 20/1 for the 157th running of the St Leger. He was one of four contenders owned by the Aga Khan, the others being Dastur (again the choice of Michael Beary), Udaipur and Taj Kasra while the other fifteen runners included April the Fifth and Orwell. He had not been an expected runner and his place in the line-up was only confirmed when he beat the Oaks winner Udaipur in a training gallop on 31 August. Firdaussi was not among the early leaders but produced a sustained run along the inside rail in the straight and moved into second place behind Dastur inside the final furlong. He caught his stablemate 50 yards from the finish and won by a neck, with a gap of four lengths back to Silvermire in third. Udaipur and Taj Kasra filled the next two places, giving the Aga Khan four of the first five finishers. After the race the Aga Khan said "I confess my heart was with Dastur. Perhaps you think that is because of betting. It is not so. I do not bet much. I love this game of racing. I am afraid before every big race and rejoice afterwards. Today it is wonderful and I do not forget the man who trained my four- Mr Frank Butters- the man who said 'Let them all run, they all have a chance'".

Firdaussi ended his season on 29 September in the £4,981 Jockey Club Stakes over fourteen furlongs at Newmarket in which he was ridden by Beary and started the 4/1 third favourite behind the four-year-olds Sandwich and Cameronian. He won a rough and closely contested race by a neck and a length from Gainslaw and Cameronian with Sandwich unplaced. Gainslaw's jockey lodged an objection on the grounds of "squeezing" (causing interference without making contact) but the racecourse stewards allowed the result to stand.

Firdausi's earnings of £17,441 in 1932 made him the most financially successful horse in Britain that year and enabled the Aga Khan and Frank Butters to claim the titles of British Champion Owner and British Champion Trainer respectively.

=== 1933: four-year-old season ===
Firdaussi began his third season by running second to Hill Cat in the March Stakes at Newmarket and then finished second, under a weight of 128 pounds, to Colorado Kid (114 pounds) in the Great Jubilee Handicap at Kempton on 6 May. In the Ascot Gold Cup in June he came home fourth behind Foxhunter, Orpen and the mare Nitsichin. In early July at Newmarket, the colt failed to recover from a poor start and finished fourth in the Princess of Wales's Stakes. He produced probably his best performance of the year in the Eclipse Stakes on 14 July when he ran second to Loaningdale.

In September at Newbury Firdaussi finished first in the John Porter Stakes but was disqualified and placed last for causing interference. On his final racecourse appearance Firdaussi recorded his first success of the season as he took the Triennial Produce Stakes at Newmarket. The contest was not particularly competitive: Firdaussi faced only one opponent and started at odds of 1/25.

== Assessment and honours ==
In their book, A Century of Champions, based on the Timeform rating system, John Randall and Tony Morris rated Firdaussi an "inferior" winner of the St Leger.

In 1934 an LNER steam locomotive was named Firdaussi in honour of the racehorse.

== Stud record ==
Firdaussi was retired from racing to become a breeding stallion in England. He was moved to France for the 1935 breeding season and was exported to Rumania in 1939 after being bought by King Carol I. The best of his offspring was probably Panipat, a colt who won the Poule d'Essai des Poulains in 1941.

== Pedigree ==
Pedigree of Firdaussi (GB), chestnut stallion, 1929
Sire Pharos (GB) 1920	Phalaris (GB); 1913	Polymelus	Cyllene
Sire Pharos (GB) 1920	Phalaris (GB); 1913	Polymelus	Maid Marian
Sire Pharos (GB) 1920	Phalaris (GB); 1913	Bromus	Sainfoin
Sire Pharos (GB) 1920	Phalaris (GB); 1913	Bromus	Cheery
Sire Pharos (GB) 1920	Scapa Flow (GB); 1914	Chaucer	St. Simon
Sire Pharos (GB) 1920	Scapa Flow (GB); 1914	Chaucer	Canterbury Pilgrim
Sire Pharos (GB) 1920	Scapa Flow (GB); 1914	Anchora	Love Wisely
Sire Pharos (GB) 1920	Scapa Flow (GB); 1914	Anchora	Eryholme
Dam Brownhylda (GB) 1920	Stedfast (GB); 1908	Chaucer	St. Simon
Dam Brownhylda (GB) 1920	Stedfast (GB); 1908	Chaucer	Canterbury Pilgrim
Dam Brownhylda (GB) 1920	Stedfast (GB); 1908	Be Sure	Surefoot
Dam Brownhylda (GB) 1920	Stedfast (GB); 1908	Be Sure	Queen Bee
Dam Brownhylda (GB) 1920	Valkyrie (GB); 1911	Eager	Enthusiast
Dam Brownhylda (GB) 1920	Valkyrie (GB); 1911	Eager	Greebo
Dam Brownhylda (GB) 1920	Valkyrie (GB); 1911	Flying Hack	Hackthorpe
Dam Brownhylda (GB) 1920	Valkyrie (GB); 1911	Flying Hack	Flying Bessie (Family: 1-c)

- Firdaussi was inbred 3 × 3 to Chaucer, meaning that this stallion appears twice in the third generation of his pedigree.
