= George Edwards (jockey) =

British jockey

Personal information
- Occupations: Jockey, Trainer

Horse racing career
- Sport: Horse racing

Major racing wins
- Major races 1,000 Guineas Stakes (1839); Epsom Derby (1837); Epsom Oaks (1830)

Significant horses
- Cara, Phosphorus, Variation

George Edwards (1805–1851) was a British classic winning jockey in the 1830s.

Edwards was the son of trainer James "Tiny" Edwards, and brother of jockeys Edward and Harry. He was a strong jockey, and used this physicality to win races, though he was not as skilled a rider as his brother Harry Edwards.

Early success came in the 1825 Goodwood Cup aboard Cricketer and the same year's Goodwood Stakes on Stumps, before his first classic win in the 1830 Oaks on Variation. His greatest success came in the 1837 Derby on Phosphorus, who, because he had been lame prior to the race, started a 40/1 outsider. Edwards also won the 1839 1,000 Guineas on Cara, emulating his brother Edward's success from the previous year.

After retiring from riding, stud manager to the Duke of Orleans Count Cambis appointed him to train the Duke's horses. At a Goodwood stable sale, he bought a horse called Beggarman for £500 and trained him up for the Duke to win the 1840 Goodwood Cup. This partnership partly began to break the dominance of Lord Seymour over the big French stakes races. Further success as a trainer seemed assured, until the Duke was thrown from his carriage and killed. Edwards was immediately evicted and despite being given the occasional ride by General Peel, his career never recovered.

George Edwards died impoverished in a Newmarket workhouse in 1851.

== Major wins ==
(United Kingdom) Great Britain

- 1,000 Guineas Stakes – Cara (1839)
- Epsom Derby – Phosphorus (1837)
- Epsom Oaks – Variation (1830)
