= Variation (horse) =

British-bred Thoroughbred racehorse

- Sire: Bustard
- Grandsire: Castrel
- Dam: Johanna Southcote
- Damsire: Beningbrough
- Sex: Mare
- Foaled: 1827
- Country: United Kingdom of Great Britain and Ireland
- Colour: Bay
- Breeder: Mr Nowell
- Owner: William Scott Stonehewer, Sr.
- Trainer: R Pettit
- Record: 15:8-2-2

Major wins
- Oaks Stakes (1830); Match against Zucharelli (1830); Match against Mouche (1831); Oatlands Stakes (1831); Garden Stakes (1831, 1832); Match against Rough Robin (1832)

Variation (1827–1847) was a British Thoroughbred racehorse and broodmare that achieved success in the racing world. In 1830, Variation made her racing debut by winning the classic Oaks Stakes at Epsom Downs Racecourse. Throughout her career, she participated in fifteen races and emerged victorious in eight of them. Her achievements included three match races, the Oatlands Stakes, and two editions of the Garden Stakes at Newmarket Racecourse. One of her notable victories came in the 1831 Garden Stakes, where she triumphed over a formidable field across a two-mile distance. Following her racing career, Variation retired in 1833 and subsequently displayed promise as a broodmare.

== Background ==
Variation was a bay mare bred in 1827, believed to be bred either by Mr Nowell or by William Scott Stonehewer, Sr. Stonehewer, described as a "great sporting man" from a "good old Yorkshire family", owned her during her racing career. She was the eighth foal produced by her dam, a daughter of Beningbrough named Johanna Southcote (1811–1834). Variation was the only classic winner sired by Bustard, a horse which won the Dee Stakes at Chester Racecourse in 1816.

== Racing career ==
=== 1830: three-year-old season ===
Variation made her racecourse debut in the Oaks Stakes over one and a half miles at Epsom on 28 May. She was ridden by George Edwards and started a 28/1 outsider in a field of eighteen fillies with the 1000 Guineas winner Charlotte West being made the 3/1 favourite. She won the classic by two lengths from Lord Sefton's filly Mouche, with Charlotte West unplaced. Stonehewer reportedly rewarded Edwards with £500 for his riding of the filly. Variation next appeared at Goodwood Racecourse in August, where she raced against colts in the Drawing-room Stakes. Carrying top weight of 122 pounds she finished unplaced behind Erymus.

In autumn Variation had three engagements at Newmarket's Second October meeting. On the opening day of the meeting she ran a match race at level weights against a colt named Zucharelli. She won the ten furlong match very easily for a prize of 200 guineas. Four days later she ran in the Newmarket Gold Cup over the Abington Mile course and finished second of the twelve runners, finishing a head behind the four-year-old colt Harold after hanging to the left in the closing stages. On the same day, Variation collected a prize of 100 guineas without having to race, when her scheduled opponent, a filly named Carmine, failed to appear for a match over ten furlongs.

=== 1831: four-year-old season ===
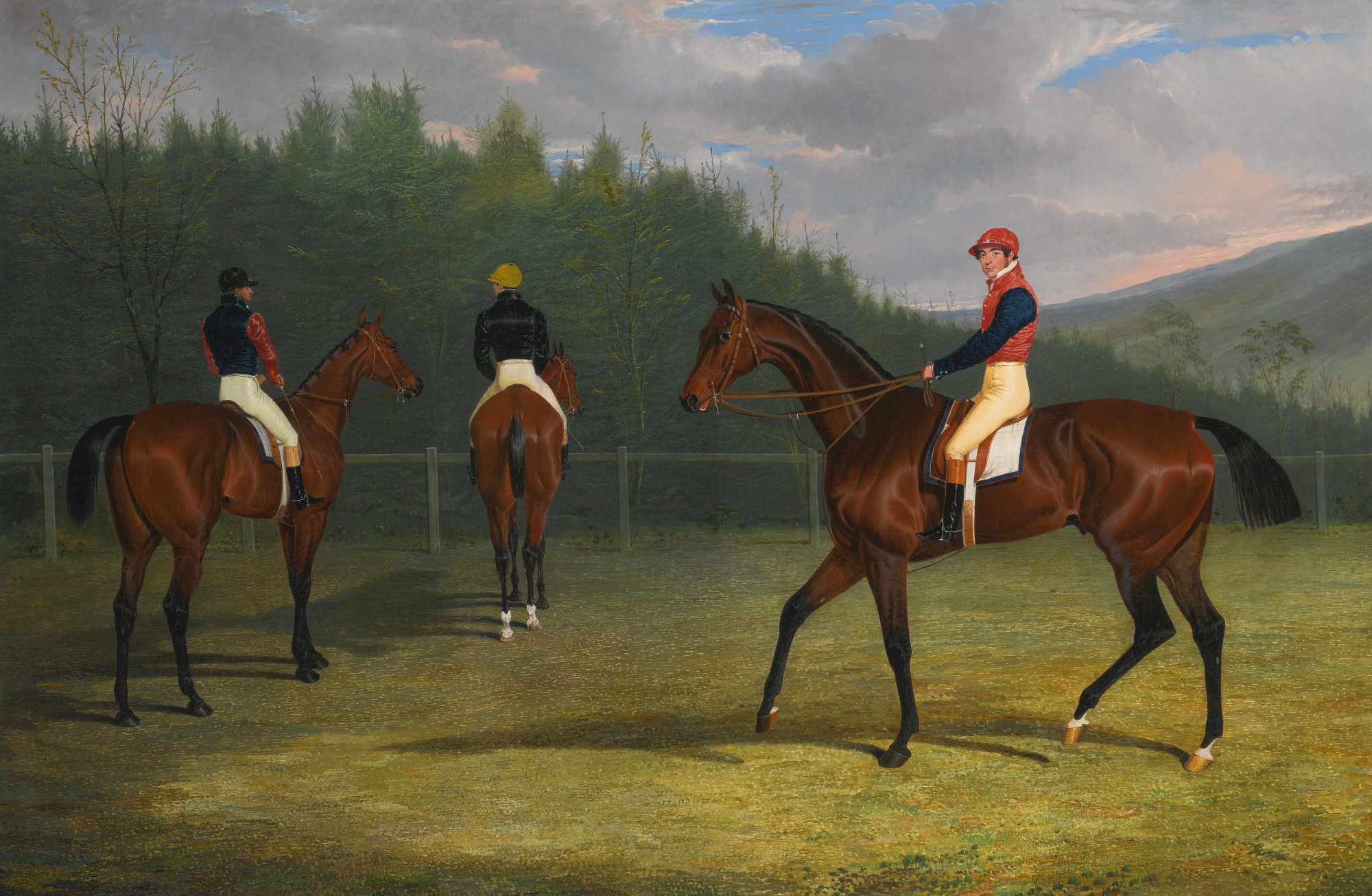
The start of the Goodwood Gold Cup, 1931, Lord Chesterfield's Priam, His Majesty King William IV's Fleur De Lis, and mr Stonehewer's Variation (John Frederick Herring, Sr., 1831)

Variation began her second season on 4 April, the opening day of the Newmarket Craven meeting. She met the Oaks runner-up Mouche in a match race over ten furlongs. Ridden by James Robinson, she carried three pounds more than her opponent and won the match by half a length to win a prize of 200 guineas. Three days later at the same meeting, the filly carried top weight of 113 pounds in a class of the Oatlands Stakes which was run over the two mile Ditch In course. With Robinson again in the saddle she started the even money favourite and won by three lengths from the colts Donegani and Beagle. At the next Newmarket meeting she started the 4/6 favourite for a sweepstakes over ten furlongs but finished last of the three runners behind Sir Mark Wood's Captain Arthur. The Sporting Magazine commented on the filly's inconsistency by saying that "she has not her name [Variation] for nothing".

Variation ran twice without success at the meeting at Goodwood Racecourse in July. She finished unplaced in the Goodwood Stakes and last of three runners behind Priam in the Goodwood Cup on the following afternoon.

The filly returned to winning form at Newmarket in autumn. On 17 October she contested the two mile Garden Stakes and started at odds of 5/1 in a field of seven runners. Ridden by Robinson she won the £900 prize, beating the 2000 Guineas winner Augustus with Captain Arthur third and the Ascot Gold Cup winner Lucetta fourth. At the Newmarket Houghton meeting on 3 November, Variation ended her season by beating Lord Wilton's Rough Robin in a 200 guinea match over ten furlongs.

=== 1832: five-year-old season ===
All of Variation's races in 1832 took place at Newmarket. She began her five-year-old season on 7 May when she finished second, attempting to concede fourteen pounds to General Grosvenor's colt Sarpedon in a sweepstakes over the Ditch In course. The Sporting Magazine's correspondent felt that a lack of fitness contributed her defeat on this occasion. Later that month she finished unplaced when carrying top weight of 124 pound in a ten furlong handicap race.

After a break of almost five months, Variation returned in October for a second Garden Stakes. Conceding at least fifteen pounds to her opponents, she won from Colonel Peel's three-year-old colt Sluggard and two others. On 30 October at the Houghton meeting, the mare carried top weight in a two-mile handicap and won from Isaac Day's five-year-old Mazeppa.

=== 1833: six-year-old season ===
Variation made one appearance as a six-year-old in 1833. On 22 April she started 4/7 favourite for the Optimist Stakes over two miles at Newmarket but was defeated by her only opponent, a mare named Volage. She was then sold to Thomas Thornhill and retired from racing.

== Stud record ==
Variation became a broodmare for Thornhill's stud. She bred eleven live foals for a variety of owners in thirteen years, all but one of them sired by The Derby winner Emilius. Variation died in 1847 at the age of 20.

The best of her foals was Pompey (foaled 1840), a colt who won the Great Yorkshire Handicap and finished second in the Northumberland Plate. An unnamed daughter of Variation was the direct female ancestor of Phaeton, a colt who was exported to Kentucky where he sired King Alfonso, who became a successful breeding stallion.

== Pedigree ==
Pedigree of Variation (GB), bay mare, 1827
Sire Bustard (GB) 1813	Castrel; 1801	Buzzard	Woodpecker
Sire Bustard (GB) 1813	Castrel; 1801	Buzzard	Misfortune
Sire Bustard (GB) 1813	Castrel; 1801	Alexander mare	Alexander
Sire Bustard (GB) 1813	Castrel; 1801	Alexander mare	Highflyer mare (1780)
Sire Bustard (GB) 1813	Miss Hap; 1806	Shuttle	Young Marske
Sire Bustard (GB) 1813	Miss Hap; 1806	Shuttle	Vauxhall Snap mare
Sire Bustard (GB) 1813	Miss Hap; 1806	sister to Haphazard	Sir Peter Teazle
Sire Bustard (GB) 1813	Miss Hap; 1806	sister to Haphazard	Miss Hervey
Dam Johanna Southcote (GB) 1811	Beningbrough; 1791	King Fergus	Eclipse
Dam Johanna Southcote (GB) 1811	Beningbrough; 1791	King Fergus	Creeping Polly
Dam Johanna Southcote (GB) 1811	Beningbrough; 1791	Fenwick's Herod mare	Herod
Dam Johanna Southcote (GB) 1811	Beningbrough; 1791	Fenwick's Herod mare	Pyrrha
Dam Johanna Southcote (GB) 1811	Lavinia; 1802	Pipator	Imperator
Dam Johanna Southcote (GB) 1811	Lavinia; 1802	Pipator	Brunette
Dam Johanna Southcote (GB) 1811	Lavinia; 1802	Highflyer mare (1790)	Highflyer
Dam Johanna Southcote (GB) 1811	Lavinia; 1802	Highflyer mare (1790)	Cardinal Puff mare (Family:9)
