= Brownhylda =

British Thoroughbred racehorse

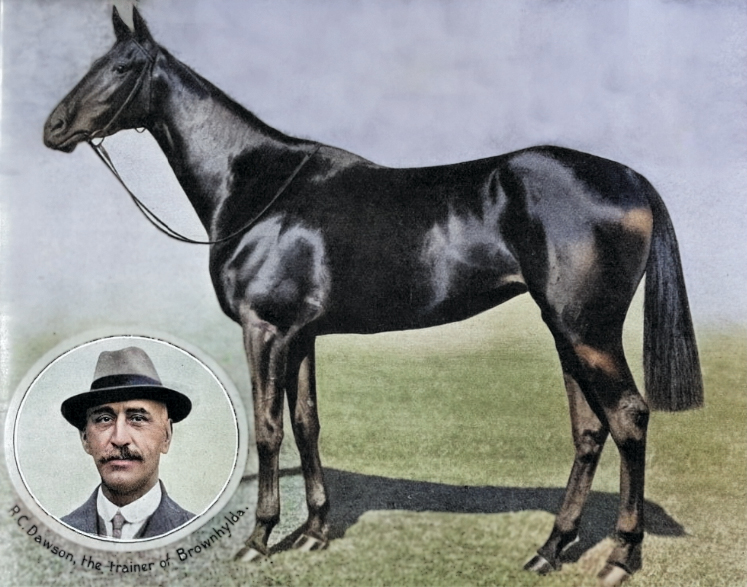
- Brownhylda in 1923 with trainer Richard Dawson in inset.
- Sire: Stedfast
- Grandsire: Chaucer
- Dam: Valkyrie
- Damsire: Eager
- Sex: Mare
- Foaled: 1920
- Country: United Kingdom
- Colour: Bay
- Breeder: F W Dunn
- Owner: Vicomte de Fontarce
- Trainer: Richard Dawson
- Record: 15: 5-3-0 (incomplete)

Major wins
- Epsom Oaks (1923); Park Hill Stakes (1923)

Brownhylda (1920 – after 1937) was a British Thoroughbred racehorse and broodmare. She showed considerable promise as a two-year-old when she won three times and finished twice on two occasions. In the following year he won the Epsom Oaks and the Park Hill Stakes as well as finishing second in the Yorkshire Oaks. Her form declined thereafter and she failed to win again before being retired at the end of the following year. She produced only four known foals, but these did include the St Leger winner Firdaussi.

== Background ==
Brownhylda was a "big, well-made, but rather plain" bay mare bred in the United Kingdom by F W Dunn. As a yearling in the autumn of 1921 the filly was offered for sale at Doncaster and bought for 310 guineas by Richard "Dick" Dawson on behalf of the Vicomte de Fontarce. She was sent into training with Dawson at Whatcombe near Wantage in Berkshire.

She was sired by Lord Derby Stedfast, a top-class performer whose wins included the Champion Stakes, Coronation Cup, Sussex Stakes, Prince of Wales's Stakes and St James's Palace Stakes. Her dam Valkyrie, was distantly descended from the influential broodmare Preserve.

== Racing career ==
=== 1922: two-year-old season ===
As a two-year-old, Brownhylda won three of her seven races namely the Prince of Wales's Nursery at Doncaster, the Autumn Foal Stakes and the November Nursery at Newbury. She also finished second to the Coventry Stakes winner Drake in the Hurstbourne Stakes in July, and to the colt Twelve Pointer in the International Two-year-old Stakes at Kempton Park Racecourse.

=== 1923: three-year-old season ===
In April 1923, Brownhylda finished unplaced behind Lord Derby's filly Tranquil in the Berkshire Handicap at Newbury. On 8 of June Brownhylda started at odds of 10/1 in a twelve-runner field for the 145th running of the Oaks Stakes over one and a half miles at Epsom Racecourse. The overwhelming favourite for the race was Tranquil, who had won the 1,000 Guineas over one mile at Newmarket. Ridden by Vic Smyth, Brownhylda tracked the leader before going to the front a furlong out and won in a closely contested finish, beating Shrove by a neck with the Aga Khan's Teresina a head away in third. Tranquil finished fourth having been unable to obtain a clear run in the straight. The filly's winning time of 2:37.0 was a second faster than the one recorded by Papyrus in winning the Derby two days earlier.

In August Brownhylda contested the Yorkshire Oaks at York Racecourse and finished second to Lord Astor's filly Splendid Jay. In September the filly was moved up in distance for the Park Hill Stakes at Doncaster. With Smyth again in the saddle she started favourite and won from Concertina. In autumn she finished second to the Queen's Vase winner Puttenden in the Lowther Stakes at Newmarket Racecourse, and ran unplaced in the Liverpool Autumn Cup.

At the end of the year Brownhylda was put up for auction at Newmarket but failed to meet her reserve price when the bidding stopped at 5,500 guineas. The Sporting Chronicle commented that she looked "leggy" and unimpressive in the sales-ring.

=== 1924: four-year-old season ===
Brownhylda remained in training as a four-year-old but made little impact on the track. She finished unplaced the City and Suburban Handicap at Epsom in April and the Jubilee Handicap at Kempton in May. In the following month she slipped and fell approaching the final turn in the Ascot Stakes. Towards the end of the season she finished unplaced under a weight of 116 pounds in the Newbury Autumn Cup. At the end of the year, Brownhylda returned to the sales-ring at Newmarket and was bought for 5,100 guineas by representatives of the Aga Khan.

== Assessment and honours ==
In their book, A Century of Champions, based on the Timeform rating system, John Randall and Tony Morris rated Brownhylda an "inferior" winner of the Oaks.

== Breeding record ==
At the end of her racing career Brownhylda became a broodmare for the Aga Khan's stud. She produced at least four foals and one notable winner:

- Witch's Cauldron, a chestnut filly, foaled in 1926, sired by Pot Au Feu. Dam of Longthanh (Poule d'Essai des Pouliches)
- The Phanar, colt, 1927
- Far And Sure, brown colt, 1928, by Phalaris
- Firdaussi, chestnut colt, 1929, by Pharos. Won St Leger.

Brownhylda failed to produce a foal in the next three seasons and was sent to France in 1937.

== Pedigree ==
Pedigree of Brownhylda (GB), bay mare, 1920
Sire Stedfast (GB) 1908	Chaucer (GB); 1900	St Simon	Galopin
Sire Stedfast (GB) 1908	Chaucer (GB); 1900	St Simon	St Angela
Sire Stedfast (GB) 1908	Chaucer (GB); 1900	Canterbury Pilgrim	Tristan
Sire Stedfast (GB) 1908	Chaucer (GB); 1900	Canterbury Pilgrim	Pilgrimage
Sire Stedfast (GB) 1908	Be Sure (GB); 1898	Surefoot	Wisdom
Sire Stedfast (GB) 1908	Be Sure (GB); 1898	Surefoot	Galopin mare
Sire Stedfast (GB) 1908	Be Sure (GB); 1898	Queen Bee	Muncaster
Sire Stedfast (GB) 1908	Be Sure (GB); 1898	Queen Bee	Acheron
Dam Valkyrie (GB) 1911	Eager (GB); 1894	Enthusiast	Sterling
Dam Valkyrie (GB) 1911	Eager (GB); 1894	Enthusiast	Cherry Duchess
Dam Valkyrie (GB) 1911	Eager (GB); 1894	Greeba	Melton
Dam Valkyrie (GB) 1911	Eager (GB); 1894	Greeba	Sunrise
Dam Valkyrie (GB) 1911	Flying Hack (GB); 1892	Hackthorpe	Strafford
Dam Valkyrie (GB) 1911	Flying Hack (GB); 1892	Hackthorpe	Rosary
Dam Valkyrie (GB) 1911	Flying Hack (GB); 1892	Flying Bessie	Vanderdecken
Dam Valkyrie (GB) 1911	Flying Hack (GB); 1892	Flying Bessie	Miss Bess (Family 1-c)
