= Preserve (horse) =

British Thoroughbred racehorse

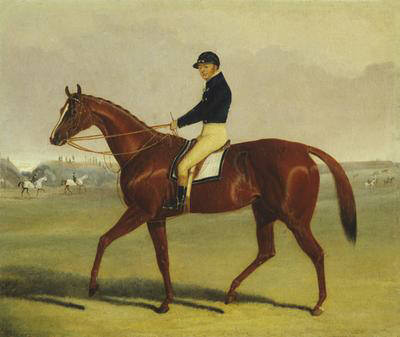
- 'Preserve' with Flatman Up at Newmarket, 1835 by John Frederick Herring, Jr.
- Sire: Emilius
- Grandsire: Orville
- Dam: Mustard
- Damsire: Merlin
- Sex: Mare
- Foaled: 1832
- Country: United Kingdom
- Colour: Chestnut
- Breeder: Charles Greville or Thomas Thornhill
- Owner: Charles Greville
- Trainer: R Prince, Jr.
- Record: 10:7-2-0

Major wins
- Clearwell Stakes (1834); Criterion Stakes (1834); 1000 Guineas (1835); Drawing-room Stakes (1835); Verulam Stakes (1835); Racing Stakes (1835)

Preserve (1832–1855) was a British Thoroughbred racehorse and broodmare who won the classic 1000 Guineas at Newmarket Racecourse in 1835. She was the leading British two-year-old filly in 1834, when she was unbeaten in three races at Newmarket. In the following spring she added a victory in the 1000 Guineas before finishing second to Queen of Trumps when favourite for the Oaks Stakes a month later. She returned to win three races at Goodwood Racecourse before ending her career by running fourth in the St Leger Stakes. After her retirement from racing, Preserve became a successful broodmare, whose direct descendants have won many important races, especially in North America.

== Background ==
Preserve was a chestnut mare bred either by Thomas Thornhill or by Charles Greville who owned her during her racing career. She was described by the New Sporting Magazine as being "a remarkably racing-like mare, of good average size with powerful limbs and a fine slashing action".

Preserve's sire, Emilius, won the Derby in 1823 and went on to become a successful stallion at the Riddlesworth stud which was owned and run by Thomas Thornhill. Apart from Preserve, Emilius’s best winners included Priam, Plenipotentiary, Oxygen, Riddlesworth (2000 Guineas) and Mango (St Leger) and he was British Champion sire in 1830 and 1831.

Preserve's dam Mustard, a daughter of the Oaks winner Morel was bred and owned by Thornhill. She showed some racing ability, finishing third in the Prendergast Stakes as a two-year-old, before becoming a successful broodmare. In addition to Preserve, her third foal, she produced her full-brother Mango, and is regarded as the Foundation mare of Thoroughbred family 1-c.

== Racing career ==
=== 1834: two-year-old season ===
Preserve began her racing career at the Second October meeting at Newmarket where she ran in the Clearwell Stakes, the start of which was delayed for almost an hour by a series of false starts and a thunderstorm. Starting the 6/4 favourite against ten opponents she won the five furlong race by a length from Mr Mills' highly regarded filly Hester. The Criterion Stakes at the Newmarket Houghton meeting two weeks later saw another meeting between Preserve and Hester. Ridden by "Old Bill" Arnull, Preserve tracked her rival throughout the early stages before moving to the front inside the final furlong and winning "cleverly" by half a length. Three days later Preserve ran a match race against Sir Mark Wood's filly Beccasine. In a race in which she carried twelve pounds more than her opponent, Preserve won to claim a prize of £300.

Preserve's status as the leading English two-year-old filly of her generations was confirmed by the bookmakers who made her favourite for the Oaks Stakes throughout the winter break.

=== 1835: three-year-old season ===
Only two unnamed fillies, from an original entry of nineteen, appeared to oppose Preserve in the 1000 Guineas over the Ditch Mile course on 6 May. Starting at odds of 1/3 she was ridden to victory by Nat Flatman, who recorded the first of his ten classic wins.

A month after her win at Newmarket, Preserve was moved up in distance to contest the Oaks Stakes over one and a half miles at Epsom Downs Racecourse. She started the 1/2 favourite in a field of ten runners, but was beaten into second place by Queen of Trumps. Although she was no match for Queen of Trumps, who won very easily, Preserve finished well clear of the other runners.

At the end of July, Preserve was sent to compete at Goodwood Racecourse where she was entered in four events. On the opening day she ran in the Drawing Room Stakes in which she was set to concede four pounds to the Riddlesworth Stakes winner Oak-Apple. Ridden again by Flatman, she won by two lengths from the colt Outcast with Oak-Apple, who was favoured in the betting, finishing third. On the following day Preserve had two engagements, beginning with the Verulam Stakes in which she was allowed to walk over the one mile course for a £100 prize after her opponents were withdrawn by their owners. Later the same day, Preserve started 9/2 second favourite for the Goodwood Stakes, an all-aged handicap run over a distance of three miles. Carrying a weight of 108 pounds, she finished second of the fourteen runners, beaten a length the Ascot Gold Cup winner Glaucus. She appeared to be a very unlucky loser, having been badly hampered when making her challenge inside the final furlong. Two days later Preserve reappeared in the one mile Racing Sweepstakes and won by ten lengths from her only opponent, a colt named Gladiator.

Preserve's only other start before her retirement came on 15 September, when she was sent north to contest the St Leger at Doncaster Racecourse. She started the 8/1 third favourite and finished fourth of the eleven runners behind Queen of Trumps.

== Stud record ==
Preserve was retired from racing to become a broodmare for her owner's stud. The most successful of her offspring was the gelding Ariosto whose wins included the Craven Stakes and the Trial Stakes, but she had a long-lasting influence on the breed through two of her daughters. Apricot, foaled in 1844, was the grandam of Coturnix (1871) the female ancestor of the Derby and Grand Prix de Paris winner Spearmint. The descendants of Coturnix's sister Raker (1881) were exported to the United States where they have been successful to the present day: members of this branch of the family include Awesome Again, High Quest, Arts and Letters, Grindstone, Pass Catcher, Silverbulletday and the Melbourne Cup winner At Talaq. Another of Preserve's daughters Doralice 1852 was the dam of Speculum, who won several important races including the Goodwood Cup. Through her daughter Dora, she was the ancestor of the classic winners Brownhylda (Oaks) and Firdaussi (St Leger). Preserve was euthanised in 1855 after failing to conceive in two successive years.

== Pedigree ==
Pedigree of Preserve (GB), chestnut mare, 1832
Sire Emilius (GB) 1820	Orville; 1799	Beningbrough	King Fergus
Sire Emilius (GB) 1820	Orville; 1799	Beningbrough	Fenwick's Herod mare
Sire Emilius (GB) 1820	Orville; 1799	Evelina	Highflyer
Sire Emilius (GB) 1820	Orville; 1799	Evelina	Termagant
Sire Emilius (GB) 1820	Emily; 1810	Stamford	Sir Peter Teazle
Sire Emilius (GB) 1820	Emily; 1810	Stamford	Horatia
Sire Emilius (GB) 1820	Emily; 1810	Whiskey mare	Whiskey
Sire Emilius (GB) 1820	Emily; 1810	Whiskey mare	Grey Dorimant
Dam Mustard (GB) 1824	Merlin; 1815	Castrel	Buzzard
Dam Mustard (GB) 1824	Merlin; 1815	Castrel	Alexander mare
Dam Mustard (GB) 1824	Merlin; 1815	Miss Newton	Delpini
Dam Mustard (GB) 1824	Merlin; 1815	Miss Newton	Tipple Cyder
Dam Mustard (GB) 1824	Morel; 1805	Sorcerer	Trumpator
Dam Mustard (GB) 1824	Morel; 1805	Sorcerer	Young Giantess
Dam Mustard (GB) 1824	Morel; 1805	Hornby Lass	Buzzard
Dam Mustard (GB) 1824	Morel; 1805	Hornby Lass	Puzzle (Family:1-c)
