= Birmingham (horse) =

British-bred Thoroughbred racehorse

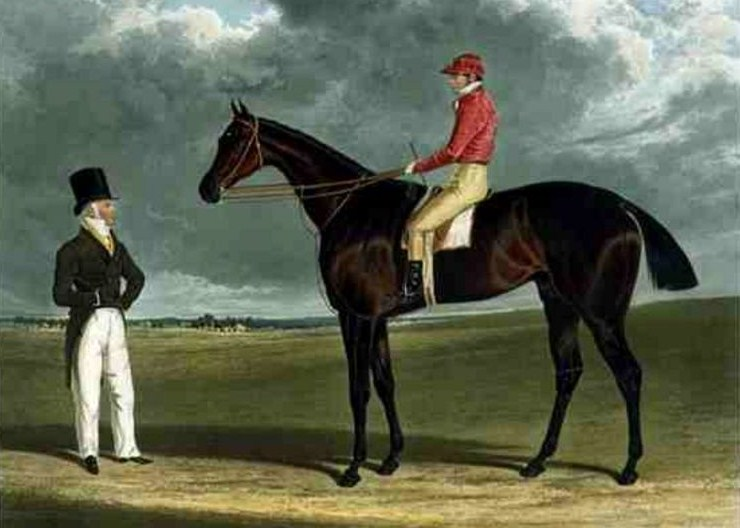
- 'Birmingham', the Winner of the Great St. Leger Stakes at Doncaster, 1830 by John Frederick Herring, Sr.
- Sire: Filho da Puta
- Grandsire: Haphazard
- Dam: Miss Craigie
- Damsire: Orville
- Sex: Stallion
- Foaled: 1827
- Country: United Kingdom
- Colour: Brown
- Breeder: Mr Lacey
- Owner: John (or William) Beardsworth
- Trainer: Thomas Flintoff
- Record: 38: 23-6-1

Major wins
- Chillington Stakes (1829); Palatine Stakes (1830); Ludford Stakes (1830); Guy Stakes (1830, disqualified); Avon Stakes (1830); St Leger Stakes (1830); Grosvenor Stakes (1831, 1832); Chester Stand Cup (1831, 1832); Liverpool Tradesman's Cup (spring 1832); Liverpool Stand Cup (1832); Burton Gold Cup (1832); Fitzwilliam Stakes (1832)

Birmingham (1827 – 1854) was a British Thoroughbred racehorse and sire best known for winning the classic St Leger Stakes in 1830. A cheaply bought foal, who almost died before he ever appeared on a racecourse, Birmingham developed into a "celebrated racer" finishing first in twenty-four races from thirty-nine starts between July 1829 and June 1833.

At a time when British horse racing was centred on a small number of major racecourses, Birmingham was campaigned at relatively minor courses in the English Midlands before defeating The Derby winner Priam to record a 15/1 upset in the St Leger. Birmingham remained in training for a further three seasons after his classic success, winning four times in 1831, six times in 1832, and once in 1833. At the end of his racing career, Birmingham was sold and exported to Russia, where he had limited success as a sire of winners.

== Background ==
Birmingham was a large, powerful brown horse standing between 16.2 and 17.0 hands, bred by Mr Lacy. As a foal, he was sold for 45 guineas to William Beardsworth, who built up a reputation in the early 1830s for winning important races with cheaply bought horses. The horse was named after Beardsworth's home town of Birmingham.

Birmingham was sired by Filho da Puta, a horse who won the St Leger in 1815 before becoming a successful breeding stallion. He was the Leading sire in Great Britain and Ireland in 1828, although Birmingham was his only classic winner. His dam, Miss Craigie, had previously produced Hedgeford, a horse who had some success as a sire of winners in the United States.

Before he was sent into full training with Thomas Flintoff (or Flintoft), Birmingham sustained a serious injury and was ordered to be destroyed but Beardsworth's wife pleaded for the horse's life and tended to him during his recovery. Birmingham grew up to be an unusually gentle and affectionate horse, becoming particularly attached to Mrs Beardsworth, who regarded him as her pet.

In the early part of the nineteenth century the most important centre for horse racing in England was Newmarket in Suffolk. The other major racecourses in the south were Epsom and Ascot while racing in northern England usually focused on the racecourses at York and Doncaster in Yorkshire. Birmingham's racing career was unusual in that his owner and trainer avoided these courses (apart from three visits to Doncaster's St Leger meeting), campaigning instead at less well-known meetings in the Western Midlands and the North West. Many of the courses he competed at, such as those at Knutsford, Lichfield and Holywell have been closed for many years, whilst others such as Ludlow and Liverpool no longer stage flat racing.

== Racing career ==
=== 1829: two-year-old season ===
Birmingham began his racing career on 1 July 1829, when he finished unplaced behind a colt named Jonathan in a half-mile sweepstakes at Ludlow Racecourse in Shropshire. On 11 August at Wolverhampton Racecourse in Staffordshire he recorded his first win as he was ridden by Sim Templeman to a victory over three opponents in the Chillington Stakes. Eight days later, Birmingham won a sweepstakes at Burton-on-Trent, with Jonathan last of the four runners. Birmingham beat Jonathan again on 3 September at Warwick Racecourse, and ended his season with a fourth consecutive win by easily beating his only opponent, a filly named Nantz, at Lichfield in Staffordshire five days later. In his last two wins he was ridden by Sam Darling.

=== 1830: three-year-old season ===
Birmingham began his three-year-old season with three races in a week at Chester Racecourse in early May. He finished unplaced in the two-mile Produce Sweepstakes on Monday and second behind the filly Moss Rose in the Dee Stakes on Wednesday. On Friday 7 May he was ridden by Templeman as he recorded his first win of the year by taking the Palatine Stakes "cleverly" by a length from Beagle. On 30 June, Birmingham ran twice at Ludlow and won both races, beating older horses in the Ludford Stakes and winning the Produce Stakes for three-year-olds from a single opponent. The colt appeared at Wolverhampton on 17 August where he was ridden to victory by Sam Darling in another three-year-old Produce Stakes.

Birmingham's next runs were at Warwick in early September where he appeared to have extended his winning run to six by easily beating the future Ascot Gold Cup winner Cetus in the Guy Stakes over one mile and then walking over in the Avon Stakes a day later. The result of the Guy Stakes, however, was the subject of a technical objection by Cetus' owners, who claimed that Birmingham was ineligible to run as his owner had not paid a forfeit of £25 when the horse had failed to appear for a race at Winchester. Beardsworth argued that he was unaware of any obligation to run Birmingham in the race, the entry having been made by the colt's previous owner, Mr Mytton, but the Stewards of the Jockey Club took the view that the rules had been broken, and awarded the 1,000 sovereign prize to Cetus.

On 17 September, two weeks after his runs at Warwick, Birmingham traveled to North Yorkshire to contest the St Leger Stakes at Doncaster Racecourse. Despite his run of success, he was not considered one of the leading contenders and started at odds of 15/1 in a field of twenty-eight runners, although he was expected to be suited by the exceptionally wet weather and heavy ground conditions. The overwhelming favourite, at odds of 11/10, was the Newmarket-trained Priam, the undefeated winner of The Derby. Ridden by the Irish jockey Patrick Conolly, Birmingham raced just behind the leaders as Emancipator set a strong pace which saw many of the runners struggling soon after half way. Priam galloped past Emancipator a furlong from the finish, but Conolly produced Birmingham with a strong run to overtake the favourite and win by half a length, with Emancipator in third. The state of the ground was put forward by some observers as an excuse for Priam's defeat, but the Sporting Magazine concluded that Birmingham was simply the better horse on the day. Three days later, over the same course and distance, and in even worse conditions, Birmingham started the odds-on favourite for a sweepstakes despite carrying a seven pound weight penalty for his classic win. With Conolly again in the saddle, he won by several lengths from Emancipator and two others.

Beardsworth turned down a proposal by Richard Tattersall for a match race between Birmingham and Priam to be held at either Doncaster or Newmarket that autumn. Birmingham ended his season on 19 October at the Holywell Hunt meeting in Flintshire, Wales where he won the opening race of the meeting, a Produce sweepstakes over two miles. Later that afternoon he was brought out again to run in the weight-for-age Mostyn Stakes but finished unplaced behind a colt named Old Port. The decision to run Birmingham twice at Holywell was criticised by the Sporting Magazine's correspondent, who felt that Beardsworth was subjecting the colt to "hard usage".

=== 1831: four-year-old season ===
Birmingham's 1831 campaign saw him competing at five meetings, running twice at each venue. He began his four-year-old season in May at Chester, where he won the Grosvenor Stakes over ten furlongs and the Chester Stand Cup in which he defeated Old Port. In July he ran twice at Liverpool. He finished unplaced in the Tradesman's Cup, a two-mile handicap race in which he was used as a pacemaker for a stable companion, and second to Recovery in the Liverpool Stand Cup, beaten a short head after a "very severe race". Later that month, Birmingham defeated Recovery in a race for a 100 sovereign Plate at Knutsford, where he also finished second in the Peover Stakes.

In September, Birmingham returned to the scene of his St Leger victory, when he contested two races at Doncaster. He finished second by "half a neck" to Emancipation in the Fitzwilliam Stakes over one and a half miles and was unplaced behind The Saddler, Emancipation and Rowton in the Doncaster Cup. As in 1830, Birmingham ended his season at the Holywell Hunt meeting in October. He finished second to Sir R W Bulkeley's colt Pickpocket in the Mostyn Stakes before walking over in the Pengwern Stakes on the following afternoon.

=== 1832: five-year-old season ===
Racing as a five-year-old in 1832, Birmingham won six of his eight races. In a repeat of 1831, he began the season by winning both the Grosvenor Stakes and the Stand Cup at Chester in May. A week later he moved north to Lancashire for the spring meeting at Liverpool where his target was the Tradesmen's Cup, an all-aged handicap race with a total value of over 1,200 sovereigns. Ridden by Sam Darling and carrying top-weight of 128 pounds he started the 6/4 favourite and won from eight opponents. His performances led the New Sporting Magazine to comment that the horse was "7 lb. better than last year."

Birmingham returned to Liverpool for the next meeting in July. He finished unplaced in that meeting's version of the Tradesmen's Cup, but won the weight-for age Liverpool Stand Cup over two and a half miles two days later. In August the horse appeared at Burton-on-Trent in Staffordshire where he won the local Gold Cup from a single opponent. In September, Birmingham ran at the St Leger meeting for the third time. He appeared to be in "beautiful racing trim" when winning the Fitwilliam Stakes over one and a half miles by a neck from Consol. He again finishing unplaced in the Doncaster Gold Cup but on this occasion there was a legitimate excuse for the horse who was found to be "coughing".

=== 1833: six-year-old season ===
On 17 April 1833 at Birmingham, all of Beardsworth's horses were put up for auction. Birmingham was the highest-priced lot, fetching 1,500 guineas and entering into the ownership of Mr Scarisbrick.

The horse began his final season with a failed attempt to win a third Stand Cup at Chester, as he finished second to Pickpocket. He then finished unplaced in the Croxteth Stakes at Liverpool on 2 July before running twice at Preston Racecourse a week later. He finished third in the Stanley Stakes over ten furlongs and ended his career by winning a sweepstakes over the same course and distance two days later.

== Stud career ==
In the summer of 1833 Birmingham was sold and as a stallion prospect to General Lounin for £1,000. He was shipped from Hull to Russia in autumn of that year, together with the 1825 Epsom Derby winner Middleton. Birmingham was not a great success as a sire of winners in Russia, but some of his daughters had influence as broodmares. Birmingham died in 1854 at 27-years-old.

== Pedigree ==
Pedigree of Birmingham (GB), brown stallion, 1827
Sire Filho da Puta (GB) 1812	Haphazard; 1797	Sir Peter Teazle	Highflyer*
Sire Filho da Puta (GB) 1812	Haphazard; 1797	Sir Peter Teazle	Papillon
Sire Filho da Puta (GB) 1812	Haphazard; 1797	Miss Hervey	Eclipse
Sire Filho da Puta (GB) 1812	Haphazard; 1797	Miss Hervey	Clio
Sire Filho da Puta (GB) 1812	Mrs Barnet; 1806	Waxy	Potoooooooo
Sire Filho da Puta (GB) 1812	Mrs Barnet; 1806	Waxy	Maria
Sire Filho da Puta (GB) 1812	Mrs Barnet; 1806	Woodpecker mare	Woodpecker
Sire Filho da Puta (GB) 1812	Mrs Barnet; 1806	Woodpecker mare	Heinel
Dam Miss Craigie (GB) 1811	Orville; 1799	Beningbrough	King Fergus
Dam Miss Craigie (GB) 1811	Orville; 1799	Beningbrough	Fenwick's Herod mare
Dam Miss Craigie (GB) 1811	Orville; 1799	Evelina	Highflyer*
Dam Miss Craigie (GB) 1811	Orville; 1799	Evelina	Termagant
Dam Miss Craigie (GB) 1811	Marchioness; 1797	Lurcher	Dungannon
Dam Miss Craigie (GB) 1811	Marchioness; 1797	Lurcher	Vertumnus mare
Dam Miss Craigie (GB) 1811	Marchioness; 1797	Miss Cogden	Phoenomenon
Dam Miss Craigie (GB) 1811	Marchioness; 1797	Miss Cogden	Young Marske mare (Family:34)

* Birmingham is inbred 4S x 4D to the stallion Highflyer, meaning that he appears fourth generation on the sire side of his pedigree and fourth generation on the dam side of his pedigree.
