= Emilius (horse) =

British-bred Thoroughbred racehorse

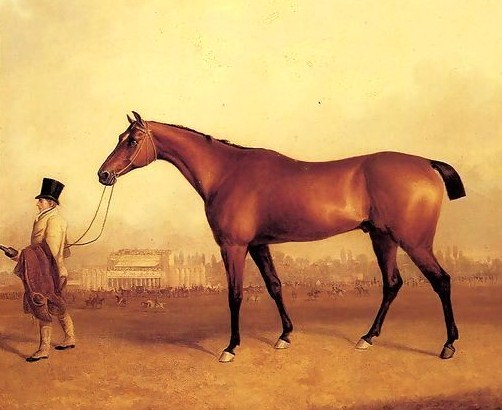
- Emilius with a groom. Painting by William Tasker.
- Sire: Orville
- Grandsire: Beningbrough
- Dam: Emily
- Damsire: Stamford
- Sex: Stallion
- Foaled: 1820
- Country: United Kingdom of Great Britain and Ireland
- Colour: Bay
- Breeder: John Udney
- Owner: John Udney
- Trainer: Robert Robson
- Record: 10:7-2-0

Major wins
- Riddlesworth Stakes (1823); Epsom Derby (1823); Grand Duke Michael Stakes (1823)

Honours
- Leading sire in Great Britain and Ireland (1830, 1831)

Emilius (1820–1847) was a British Thoroughbred racehorse and sire. In a career that lasted from April 1823 to October 1824, he ran ten times and won seven races, including a walkover. As a three-year-old in 1823, he was undefeated in six starts, including the Derby. After a less impressive year in 1824, he was retired to stud and became a highly successful and important breeding stallion.

== Background ==
Emilius was a "muscular, compact" bay horse with a white star bred by his owner, Colonel John Udney. The colt was sent into training with Robert Robson, known as the "Emperor of Trainers" who produced the winners of thirty-four Classic races from his base at Newmarket, Suffolk. Emilius was ridden in all his races by the veteran Frank Buckle, who was fifty-seven years old at the time of the colt's greatest successes.

Emilius was sired by Orville, a successful stayer racehorse who excelled over extreme distances. At stud he was a Champion sire in 1817 and 1822 and sired the Classic winners Octavius (Derby), Charlotte (1000 Guineas), Zoe (1000 Guineas) and Ebor (St Leger).

== Racing career ==
=== 1823: three-year-old season ===
Emilius did not run as a two-year-old, but his performances on the Newmarket training gallops were enough for him to be regarded as one of the leading colts of his generation. By March 1823, still unraced, he was disputing the position of favourite for the Derby in the betting lists.

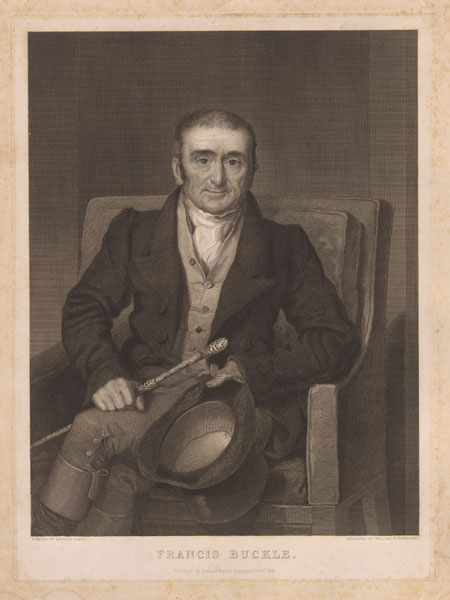
Frank Buckle: Emilius was his fifth Derby winner

Emilius began his racing career at the Craven meeting at Newmarket on 14 April when he started 5/4 favourite for the Riddlesworth Stakes, a race which at the time had a prestige equal to the Classics and more prize money than the Derby. He won the 2,400 guinea prize, beating Talisman, from whom he was receiving three pounds. He then collected a further 1,500 guineas for his owner three days later without having to race as his rivals were withdrawn from the Dinner Stakes, and he was allowed to walk over to claim the prize. At the next Newmarket meeting, he bypassed the 2000 Guineas to run in a Sweepstakes. When four of his opponents withdrew, Colonel Udney agreed to divide the prize money with Lord Exeter, the owner of Emilius's only remaining rival.

At Epsom Emilius started the 11/8 favourite in a field of eleven runners for the Derby. Tancred was next in the betting at 13/8, with the 2000 Guineas winner Nicolo on 10/1. Buckle sent Emilius to the front from the start, and he maintained his lead until the turn into the straight at Tattenham Corner. Here he was joined by Tancred, and the two colts quickly drew clear of the field to dispute the finish between them. For most of the last quarter of a mile Tancred appeared to have the advantage, but Buckle was riding with great confidence and keeping Emilius under restraint until the last moment. When Buckle finally used his whip on the favourite, Emilius "sprung forward like a dart" and won by a length from Tancred with the rest of the runners too far behind to be placed by the judge. For Buckle, it was a fifth Derby and a twenty-fourth Classic. At Ascot in June, he started at 1/6 and won a 500 guinea Sweepstakes over a mile, his only rival being an unnamed colt by the Whisker colt (later called Shaver). He was then rested until autumn.

At Newmarket, Emilius returned in the 1,200 guinea Grand Duke Michael Stakes on 29 September, in which he faced the season's leading filly Zinc, the winner of the 1000 Guineas and The Oaks. Emilius started at odds of 1/2 and won easily. On his final start of the year, Emilius beat Cinder by three lengths in a 1,000 guinea Sweepstakes on 13 October to complete an unbeaten season.

=== 1824: four-year-old season ===
Emilius's winning sequence ended on his four-year-old debut. He was beaten by the six-year-old mare Augusta, winner of the 1821 Epsom Oaks from whom he was receiving six pounds in a 300-guinea match race at Newmarket on 7 May.

Emilius was off the racecourse for five months before returning for the autumn meetings at Newmarket. At the first October meeting he won a one-mile match against an unnamed colt known as "Jock the Laird's brother". Later that month he faced a much more competitive match in which he attempted to give seven pounds to the Ascot Gold Cup winner Bizarre and was beaten for the £300 prize. On his final start he ran poorly, finishing last of the six runners behind Zealot in the Audley End Stakes.

== Stud career ==
At the end of his racing career, Emilius was sold for 1,800 guineas to Thomas Thornhill, who based the stallion at his Riddlesworth stud at Thetford, Norfolk at an initial fee of 20 guineas. As Emilius proved himself as a stallion his fee eventually rose to 50 guineas. When Thornhill died in 1844 Emilius, who was then in poor condition, was bought by Lord George Bentinck who rested the stallion and had him steadily restored to health. Bentinck then leased Emilius to R. M. Jaques to stand as a stallion at Easby Abbey in Yorkshire where he covered mares for two further years at a fee of 16 guineas. He died in September 1847 after choking on a meal of poorly prepared oats, and was buried in the grounds of the ruined abbey.

Emilius was an immediate success at stud. He was the British Champion sire in 1830 and 1831 and was regarded as the best sire of his time in England.

Foaled	Name	Sex	Major Wins/Achievements
1827	Priam	Stallion	Epsom Derby, Leading sire in Great Britain and Ireland, Leading sire in North America
1828	Oxygen	Mare	Epsom Oaks
1828	Riddlesworth	Stallion	2000 Guineas Stakes
1831	Plenipotentiary	Stallion	Epsom Derby
1832	Preserve	Mare	1000 Guineas Stakes
1835	Barcarolle	Mare	1000 Guineas Stakes
1840	Extempore	Mare	1000 Guineas Stakes
1834	Mango	Stallion	St Leger Stakes

== Sire line tree ==
- Emilius
  - Agreeable
  - Priam
    - Chesterfield
      - The Hero
        - Rogerthorpe
        - Raglan
    - Monarch
      - Revenge
    - Prizeflower
    - Rubens
    - Scamander
    - Troilus
    - Bretby
    - Dey Of Algiers
    - Tros
      - Tros
        - Chevalier
    - Young Priam
    - Giges
      - Royal Quand-Meme
        - Pompier
    - Regent
    - Bay Priam
    - Daniel Webster
    - Alexander
    - Lamar
    - Lambda
      - Bob Howard
  - Recovery
    - Retriever
    - Reprieve
  - St Nicholas
    - St Lawrence
      - Saucebox
    - St John
      - Little John
      - Plover
      - Union Jack
    - Yorkshire
      - Allendale
      - John Aiken
        - Joe Aiken
      - Kennett
      - Waterloo
      - Capt Beard
      - Austerlitz
      - Yorktown
      - Solferino
      - Lodi
        - Nathan Coombs
    - Gasperoni
    - Longsight
      - Barton
    - Incognito
    - Lionel
    - Uriel
  - Tantivy
  - Chapman
  - Ciudad Rodrigo
  - Exile
  - Marcus
  - Riddlesworth
  - Sarpedon
    - Louis d'Or
  - Young Emilius
    - Renonce
    - Fitz Emilius
    - Amalfi
  - Hawker
  - Lucius
  - Mosquito
  - Plentipotentiary
    - Alexander
    - Ambassador
    - Envoy
    - Herold
      - Nuncio
    - Nuncio
      - First Born
      - Festival
      - Pedagogue
        - Lesbos
      - Valbruant
      - Black Prince
    - The Era
  - Coriolanus
  - Operator
    - Emilius
    - Figaro
      - Il Barbiere
        - Strop
  - Young Emilius
  - Mango
    - Portumnus
  - Riddlesworth
    - Clymeneus
    - Dainty Ariel
      - Kingfisher
      - Ariel
      - Hippocampus
        - The Baron
    - Scud
      - Knottingley
  - The Steamer
  - Euclid
    - Bantam
      - Cockatoo
      - Zouave
        - The Lamb
        - Kaolin
          - Varaville
  - Mercer
    - Traveller
  - Sovereign
    - Childe Harold
      - Peaks Of Otter
      - Slasher
      - Loyalty
      - Doswell
    - Mahomet
    - Charleston
    - Ruric
      - Terror
        - Vice Chancellor
        - Williams
        - Victorius
    - Sequin
    - Marengo
    - Mogul
    - Colossus
      - Jack Gambol
    - John Morgan
    - Prolific
  - Record
  - Theon
  - Pompey
    - Millionaire
  - The Caster
    - Wollaton
      - Toryboy
  - Elemi
  - Tragical
  - Mathematician
    - Monge
  - Gambetti

== Pedigree ==
Pedigree of Emilius (GB), bay stallion, 1820
Sire Orville (GB) 1799	Beningbrough; 1791	King Fergus	Eclipse*
Sire Orville (GB) 1799	Beningbrough; 1791	King Fergus	Creeping Polly
Sire Orville (GB) 1799	Beningbrough; 1791	Fenwick's Herod mare	Herod*^
Sire Orville (GB) 1799	Beningbrough; 1791	Fenwick's Herod mare	Pyrrha
Sire Orville (GB) 1799	Evelina; 1791	Highflyer*	Herod*^
Sire Orville (GB) 1799	Evelina; 1791	Highflyer*	Rachel
Sire Orville (GB) 1799	Evelina; 1791	Termagant	Tantrum
Sire Orville (GB) 1799	Evelina; 1791	Termagant	Cantatrice
Dam Emily (GB) 1810	Stamford; 1794	Sir Peter Teazle	Highflyer*^
Dam Emily (GB) 1810	Stamford; 1794	Sir Peter Teazle	Papillon
Dam Emily (GB) 1810	Stamford; 1794	Horatia	Eclipse*
Dam Emily (GB) 1810	Stamford; 1794	Horatia	Countess
Dam Emily (GB) 1810	Whiskey mare 1799	Whiskey	Saltram*^
Dam Emily (GB) 1810	Whiskey mare 1799	Whiskey	Calash*^
Dam Emily (GB) 1810	Whiskey mare 1799	Grey Dorimant	Dorimant
Dam Emily (GB) 1810	Whiskey mare 1799	Grey Dorimant	Dizzy (Family:28)

* Emilius is inbred 3S x 4D to the stallion Highflyer, meaning that he appears third generation on the sire side of his pedigree and fourth generation on the dam side of his pedigree.

*^ Emilius is inbred 4S x 4S x 5D x 5D to the stallion Herod, meaning that he appears fourth generation twice on the sire side of his pedigree and fifth generation twice (via Highflyer and Calash)^ on the dam side of his pedigree.

*^ Emilius is inbred 4S x 4D x 5D to the stallion Eclipse, meaning that he appears fourth generation on the sire side of his pedigree and fourth generation and fifth generation (via Saltram)^ on the dam side of his pedigree.
