= Plenipotentiary (horse) =

British-bred Thoroughbred racehorse

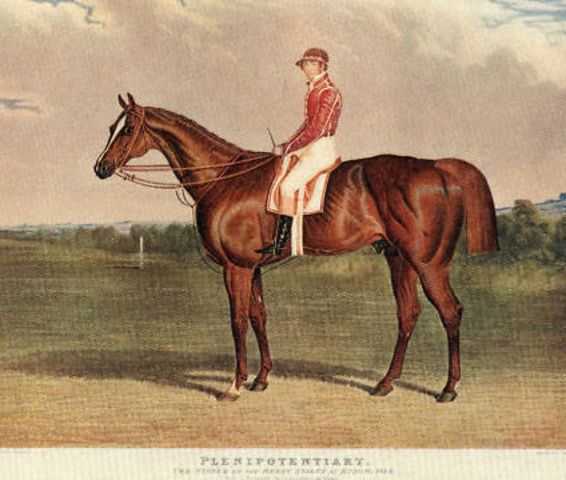
- Plenipotentiary, by Harry Hall.
- Sire: Emilius
- Grandsire: Orville
- Dam: Harriet
- Damsire: Pericles
- Sex: Stallion
- Foaled: 1831
- Country: United Kingdom of Great Britain and Ireland
- Colour: Chestnut
- Breeder: Stanlake Batson
- Owner: Stanlake Batson
- Trainer: George Payne
- Record: 8: 7-0-0

Major wins
- Riddlesworth Stakes (1834); Epsom Derby (1834); St. James's Palace Stakes (1834); Craven Stakes (1835); Port Stakes (1835)

Plenipotentiary (1831–1854) was a British Thoroughbred racehorse and sire. In a career that lasted from April 1834 to April 1835 he ran seven times and won six races. His most important win came in May 1834 when he won The Derby. His only defeat, in the St Leger at Doncaster later that year, was widely believed to be the result of foul play. After three successes as a four-year-old in 1835 he was retired to stud where his record was disappointing. Plenipotentiary was regarded by racing experts as one of the best British racehorses of his era.

== Background ==
Plenipotentiary was a big, heavily built chestnut horse with a narrow white blaze standing 15.2 hands high. He was described as a horse of "extraordinary beauty" but also possessing the size and strength to work "between the shafts of a cabriolet". He was bred by his owner Stanlake Batson of Horseheath, Cambridgeshire. His sire, Emilius, won the Derby in 1823 and went on to become a successful stallion at the Riddlesworth stud which was owned and run by Thomas Thornhill. Apart from Plenipotentiary, Emilius's best winners included Priam, Riddlesworth and Mango and he was British Champion sire in 1830 and 1831. Plenipotentiary was one of several good winners produced by the mare Harriet. According to one account, however, there was some doubt about Plenipotentiary's paternity: Thomas Thornhill's son-in law claimed that Harriet had actually been covered by a stallion named Merlin.

Plenipotentiary's rather unwieldy name was habitually shortened to “Plenipo” by racing followers and writers. He was trained at Newmarket, Suffolk by George Payne.

== Racing career ==
=== 1834: three-year-old season ===
Plenipotentiary was unraced as a two-year-old but was not unknown to the racing world as he appeared in the betting for the 1834 Derby in October 1833 when he was offered by bookmaker at odds of 30/1 and quickly backed down to 15/1.

Plenipotentiary made his first racecourse appearance at the Craven Meeting at Newmarket in April 1834. He started the 1/2 favourite and won a £50 Sweepstakes from an unnamed “Emilus colt”, in exceptionally impressive style. Two days later, he ran against much stronger opposition in a £100 Sweepstakes. His only rival was Lord Jersey's colt Glencoe, who had won the important Riddlesworth Stakes two days earlier and the race between the two impressive colts created intense interest. James “Jemmy” Robinson on Glencoe attempted to expose any weakness in Plenipotentiary's fitness by setting an extremely testing pace. Plenipotentiary, however was able to match the leader's speed before moving easily clear to win by three or four lengths. Robinson commented that he thought that he had the race won before he saw “that great bullock cantering at my side”. Two weeks later, Glencoe won the 2000 Guineas.

At Epsom, on 29 May Plenipotentiary started 9/4 favourite for the Derby in a field of twenty-two runners, with Shillelagh, ridden by Sam Chifney being his main rival in the betting at 3/1. The race was the most anticipated for several years and attracted a crowd which was described as being unusually large and fashionable. After five false starts the race got under way, and although he broke quickly, Plenipotentiary was restrained by Patrick Conolly and settled just behind the leading group. After moving through a gap along the inside rails, Plenipotentiary moved up to challenge Glencoe for the lead early in the straight. The two colts raced side by side until they were inside the final furlong where Conolly made his move, and the favourite quickly went clear to win very easily by two lengths from Shillelagh, with Glencoe third.

Plenipotentiary and Glencoe were scheduled to meet again in the St. James's Palace Stakes at Royal Ascot, but Lord Jersey withdrew his colt and Plenipotentiary was allowed to walk over for the £850 prize money. One report claims that Plenipotentiary looked very unsteady on his feet when cantering over the course, but little attention was paid to this at the time.

Plenipotentiary started 10/11 favourite for the St Leger at Doncaster in September against ten opponents. His first appearance in front of the crowds, however, led to alarm, as he seemed barely able to gallop and was described as looking "more like a pig than a racehorse", causing his supporters to start "hedging" their bets by wagering on other runners. In the race, Plenipotentiary ran very poorly: he struggled to match the pace of the other runners and despite being ridden hard by Conolly he dropped away to finish tenth behind the 40/1 outsider Touchstone. Various reasons were suggested for Plenipotentiary's dismal performance. Some felt that he had he was lacking fitness and that the colt's naturally bulky physique had been allowed to run to fat. Others noted that the normally lively and energetic Plenipotentiary seemed sluggish and unsteady before the race and suggested that he had been drugged by bookmakers or other "scoundrels" who stood to lose a great deal of money if the colt won. This explanation was "generally believed", and it was pointed out that the security at the racecourse stables was unacceptably lax. Conolly said that the colt seemed “dead as a stone”.

=== 1835: four-year-old season ===
In the spring of 1835, Plenipotentiary returned to Newmarket for the Craven meeting at which he ran three times. He first ran against a strong field in the Craven Stakes. The pace was very strong as his opponents attempted to "choke off" the favourite, but Plenipotentiary won easily, beating Nonsense by a length with Shillelagh among the beaten horses. His next race provoked great interest as he ran over a sprint distance for the first time, being matched against the 2000 Guineas winner Clearwell in a Subscription Plate over five furlongs. He won by three lengths with his jockey declaring that he was "never at half his speed". His final “race” was a walkover for the Port Stakes later that afternoon when all four of his opponents were withdrawn.

Plans to run Plenipotentiary in the Ascot Gold Cup were abandoned on the day before the race, despite the fact that he had been performing well in exercise. Some reports claim the colt "went amiss", while others state that Batson was unwilling to risk his horse on the prevailing hard ground. There was some anger about his late withdrawal from the race, and his trainer George Paine, was advised to leave Ascot for his own safety. Plenipotentiary never ran again and was retired to stud.

== Assessment ==
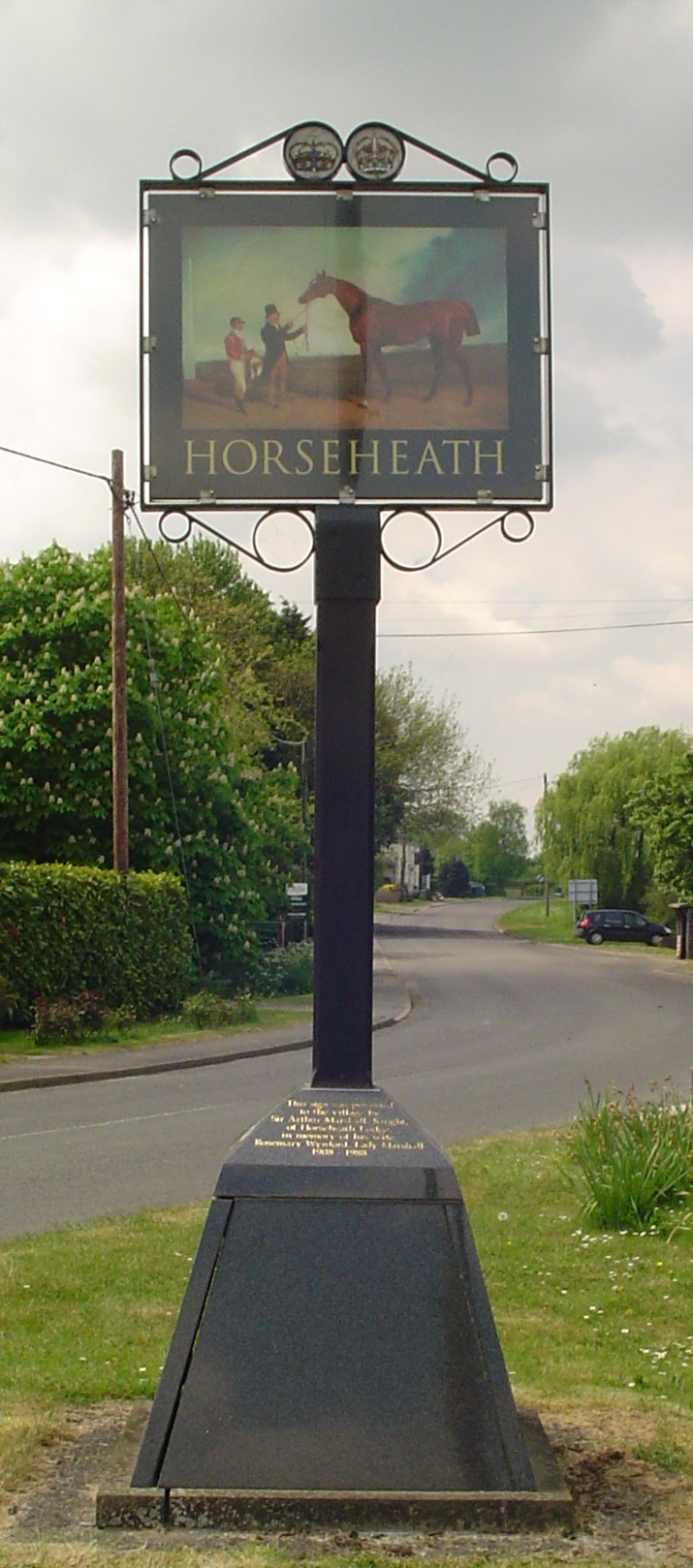
The village sign at Horseheath

In May 1886 the Sporting Times carried out a poll of one hundred racing experts asking them to name the ten best horses of the 19th century. In July of that year the results of the poll were published as a ranking list. Although his racing career had ended more than fifty years earlier, Plenipotentiary was ranked eighteenth, having been placed in the top ten by fifteen of the voters. He was the second highest-placed horse of the 1830s behind Bay Middleton.

Sam Chifney was reported to have said that the Derby runner-up Shillelagh was a better horse than his 1830 winner Priam but was a stone (14 pounds) inferior to Plenipotentiary. Baily's Magazine when comparing great horses expressed the view that the field beaten by Plenipotentiary at Epsom was one of the strongest in the history of the race. The author of "The Cracks of the Day" offered the opinion that Plenipotentiary was, to his "humble thinking", the best racehorse England ever possessed.

The village sign at Horseheath carries a picture of Plenipotentiary.

== Stud career ==
Plenipotentiary began his career as a stallion with a fee of 25 guineas. He sired two Classic winners in Potentia (1000 Guineas) and Poison (Epsom Oaks), while the best of his colts was probably The Era, who won a Northumberland Plate and defeated Cotherstone in a private trial. Given his prowess as a racehorse however, his record as a sire was a disappointment, with the Sporting Review noting that his achievements read "better in the Calendar than the Stud-Book". In his later years he was covering half-bred mares for local farmers at a fee of 5 guineas. He died at Denham, near Uxbridge in either December 1853 or January 1854. His gravestone is in the woods at Denham Place.

== Sire line tree ==
- Plentipotentiary
  - Alexander
  - Ambassador
  - Envoy
  - Herold
    - Nuncio
  - Nuncio
    - First Born
    - Festival
    - Pedagogue
      - Lesbos
    - Valbruant
    - Black Prince
  - The Era

== Pedigree ==
Pedigree of Plenipotentiary (GB), chestnut stallion, 1831
Sire Emilius (GB) 1820	Orville; 1799	Beningbrough	King Fergus
Sire Emilius (GB) 1820	Orville; 1799	Beningbrough	Fenwick’s Herod mare
Sire Emilius (GB) 1820	Orville; 1799	Evelina	Highflyer*^
Sire Emilius (GB) 1820	Orville; 1799	Evelina	Termagant
Sire Emilius (GB) 1820	Emily; 1810	Stamford	Sir Peter Teazle*^
Sire Emilius (GB) 1820	Emily; 1810	Stamford	Horatia
Sire Emilius (GB) 1820	Emily; 1810	Whiskey mare	Whiskey
Sire Emilius (GB) 1820	Emily; 1810	Whiskey mare	Grey Dorimant
Dam Harriet (GB) 1819	Pericles; 1809	Evander	Delpini^
Dam Harriet (GB) 1819	Pericles; 1809	Evander	Caroline
Dam Harriet (GB) 1819	Pericles; 1809	Precipitate mare	Precipitate
Dam Harriet (GB) 1819	Pericles; 1809	Precipitate mare	Firetail^
Dam Harriet (GB) 1819	Selim Mare; 1812	Selim	Buzzard
Dam Harriet (GB) 1819	Selim Mare; 1812	Selim	Alexander mare
Dam Harriet (GB) 1819	Selim Mare; 1812	Pipylina	Sir Peter Teazle*^
Dam Harriet (GB) 1819	Selim Mare; 1812	Pipylina	Rally (Family: 6b)

* Plenipotentiary is inbred 4S x 4D to the stallion Sir Peter Teazle, meaning that he appears fourth generation on the sire side of his pedigree and fourth generation on the dam side of his pedigree.

*^ Plenipotentiary is inbred 4S x 5S x 5D x 5D x 5D to the stallion Highflyer, meaning that he appears fourth generation once and fifth generation once (via Sir Peter Teazle)^ on the sire side of his pedigree and fifth generation thrice (via Delpini, Firetail, and Sir Peter Teazle)^ on the dam side of his pedigree.
