= Oxygen (horse) =

British-bred Thoroughbred racehorse

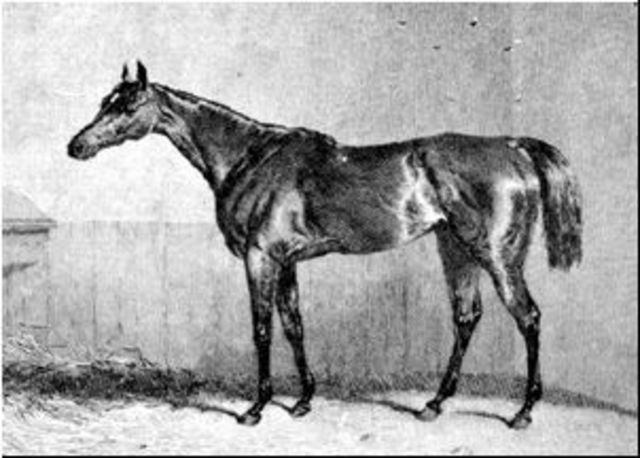
- Sire: Emilius
- Grandsire: Orville
- Dam: Whizgig
- Damsire: Rubens
- Sex: Mare
- Foaled: 1828
- Country: United Kingdom of Great Britain and Ireland
- Colour: Bay
- Breeder: George FitzRoy, 4th Duke of Grafton
- Owner: Duke of Grafton
- Trainer: Robert Stephenson
- Record: 15:8-5-1

Major wins
- Anson Stakes (1830); Clearwell Stakes (1830); Oaks Stakes (1831); Oatlands Stakes (1832); King's Plate at Newmarket (1832)

Oxygen (foaled 1828, died in winter 1854–1855) was a British Thoroughbred racehorse and broodmare who won the classic Oaks Stakes at Epsom Downs Racecourse in 1831. In a racing career which lasted from July 1830 until April 1833 she won eight of her fifteen races and finished second on five occasions. Oxygen's Oaks was the last of twenty classic wins for her owner George FitzRoy, 4th Duke of Grafton.

Oxygen was regarded the leading two-year-old filly in the South of England in 1830, when she won two of her three races. At three she was beaten in a controversial race when odds-on favourite for the 1000 Guineas but returned to form to win the Oaks a month later. In the following year she won an important handicap race at Newmarket and defeated the leading stayer Lucetta in a King's Plate over three and a half miles. She was retired from racing after a single unsuccessful race as a five-year-old and was retired to stud, where she had some success as a broodmare.

== Background ==
Oxygen was a bay mare with a white star bred by her owner the 4th Duke of Grafton at his stud at Euston Hall in Suffolk. Oxygen's sire, Emilius, won the Derby in 1823 and went on to become a successful stallion at the Riddlesworth stud which was owned and run by Thomas Thornhill. Apart from Oxygen, Emilius’s best winners included Priam, Plenipotentiary, Riddlesworth (2000 Guineas) and Mango (St Leger) and he was British Champion sire in 1830 and 1831.

Oxygen's dam, Whizgig was a daughter of the Duke of Grafton's outstanding broodmare Penelope, making her a half-sister to Derby winners Whalebone and Whisker. Whizgig was a top-class racemare who won seven races including the 1822 1000 Guineas. Oxygen was her third foal.

== Racing career ==
=== 1830: two-year-old season ===
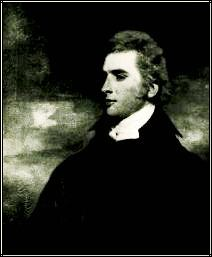
The Duke of Grafton, who bred and owned Oxygen

In the early 19th century most horses began their careers at the age of three and there were relatively few races for two-year-olds. One of the most important and longest established races for juveniles was the July Stakes which had been run at Newmarket Racecourse since 1786. Oxygen made her debut in this race on 12 July 1830 and finished second of the eight runners, two lengths behind a colt named Zany, with the future Derby winner Spaniel among the unplaced horses.

Oxygen returned to action at the Newmarket First October meeting. She recorded her first success in the £300 Anson Stakes, over five furlongs, winning comfortably by a length from the colts Bohemian and Morisco. At the Second October meeting, she started the 11/8 against twelve opponents in the Clearwell Stakes. Ridden by John Barham Day, Oxygen won the five furlong race impressively by two or three lengths from Lord Egremont's unnamed black filly. The unplaced runners included a filly sired by Reveller out of Snowdrop who was later named Galantine. According to one observer, the winner displayed "an Eclipse-like superiority" over the opposition. After her win in the Clearwell Stakes Oxygen was made favourite for the following year's Oaks ahead of the Yorkshire-trained Circassian, with the two fillies dominating the betting markets.

=== 1831: three-year-old season ===
Oxygen was scheduled to begin her three-year-old season in a £100 Sweepstakes at Newmarket on 18 April. She did not have to compete, however, as the other eight horses entered for the race were withdrawn by their owners, leaving Oxygen to walk over the course to claim the prize money. Three days later in the 1000 Guineas Oxygen was made the favourite at 2/5, the same odds at which her mother Whizgig had started when winning the race nine years earlier. She failed to emulate her dam as she finished third (officially "unplaced") behind the upset winner Galantine after an extremely slow early pace resulted in the race developing into sprint over the last furlong. The Sporting Magazine criticised the "stupid" tactics of the jockeys and described the winner as "a paltry, scratching thing" at least a stone inferior to Oxygen at her best.

On 20 May Oxygen started at odds of 12/1 for the Oaks Stakes over one and a half miles at Epsom. The race attracted 83 entries and a final field of twenty-one runners, the largest in the race's history. Ridden as usual by Day, Oxygen overtook the front-running Delight in the straight and won by a neck from Lord Exeter's filly Marmora, with Guitar third and the favourite Circassian in fourth. The first three finishers in the Oaks met again in a Sweepstakes over one mile at Ascot on 1 June, the other nine entries having been withdrawn by their owners. The result was the more emphatic than at Epsom, with Oxygen leading from the start and winning very easily from Marmora and Guitar.

After a break of four months, Oxygen returned in October for the Newmarket St Leger over two miles. She proved too good for the four colts who opposed her but was beaten by Camarine, a filly who went on to win the following year's Ascot Gold Cup. Two weeks later, Oxygen's season ended as it had begun, as she recorded a walkover victory in a ten-furlong subscription race.

=== 1832: four-year-old season ===
Oxygen ran three times at Newmarket in the spring of 1832. At the Craven meeting in April, she began her season in a division of the Oatlands Stakes, a handicap over the two-mile "Ditch In" course. Carrying a weight of 107 pounds and ridden by Patrick Conolly, she started the 2/1 favourite and demonstrated a "game heart" to win by a length from the colts Mazeppa and Sarpedon. Until 1834, racehorses' ages advanced by a year on 1 May rather than 1 January, meaning that Oxygen was officially a three-year-old at this time. At the next meeting Oxygen contested a 100 guinea King's Plate over the three and a half mile Round Course against the 1830 Ascot Gold Cup winner Lucetta, from whom she was receiving twenty pounds. Day sent Oxygen into the lead from the start and she held off repeated challenges from the older mare to win by a length. Two weeks later, Oxygen and Lucetta met again in the Jockey Club Plate over the four mile Beacon Course and Lucetta reversed the form with her younger rival to win a prize of £50.

Oxygen failed to reproduce her best form at Newmarket in the autumn. At the Second October meeting she finished last of the three runners behind Margaret and Naiad in a Sweepstakes over the Rowley Mile. At the Houghton meeting two weeks later she was beaten in a two-mile match race by Mr Vansittart's colt Rubini from whom she was receiving six pounds.

=== 1833: five-year-old season ===
Oxygen remained in training in 1833, but ran only once. In a division of the Oatlands Stakes in April she started 4/6 favourite, but was beaten by her only opponent, a mare named Dinah.

== Stud record ==
Oxygen was retired to become a broodmare at the Duke of Grafton's stud. In 1837 she produced a filly foal named Currency, sired by St Patrick. Currency became a successful broodmare, producing the Prix du Jockey Club winners Jouvence and Saint Germain. Oxygen produced ten foals between 1835 and 1849 and was euthanized in the winter of 1854-1855 after being barren for five years.

== Pedigree ==
Pedigree of Oxygen (GB), bay mare, 1828
Sire Emilius (GB) 1820	Orville; 1799	Beningbrough	King Fergus
Sire Emilius (GB) 1820	Orville; 1799	Beningbrough	Fenwick's Herod mare
Sire Emilius (GB) 1820	Orville; 1799	Evelina	Highflyer
Sire Emilius (GB) 1820	Orville; 1799	Evelina	Termagant
Sire Emilius (GB) 1820	Emily; 1810	Stamford	Sir Peter Teazle
Sire Emilius (GB) 1820	Emily; 1810	Stamford	Horatia
Sire Emilius (GB) 1820	Emily; 1810	Whiskey mare	Whiskey
Sire Emilius (GB) 1820	Emily; 1810	Whiskey mare	Grey Dorimant
Dam Whizgig (GB) 1819	Rubens; 1805	Buzzard	Woodpecker
Dam Whizgig (GB) 1819	Rubens; 1805	Buzzard	Misfortune
Dam Whizgig (GB) 1819	Rubens; 1805	Alexander mare	Alexander
Dam Whizgig (GB) 1819	Rubens; 1805	Alexander mare	Highflyer mare
Dam Whizgig (GB) 1819	Penelope; 1798	Trumpator	Conductor
Dam Whizgig (GB) 1819	Penelope; 1798	Trumpator	Brunette
Dam Whizgig (GB) 1819	Penelope; 1798	Prunella	Highflyer
Dam Whizgig (GB) 1819	Penelope; 1798	Prunella	Promise (Family:1-o)
