= Priam (horse, foaled 1827) =

British-bred Thoroughbred racehorse

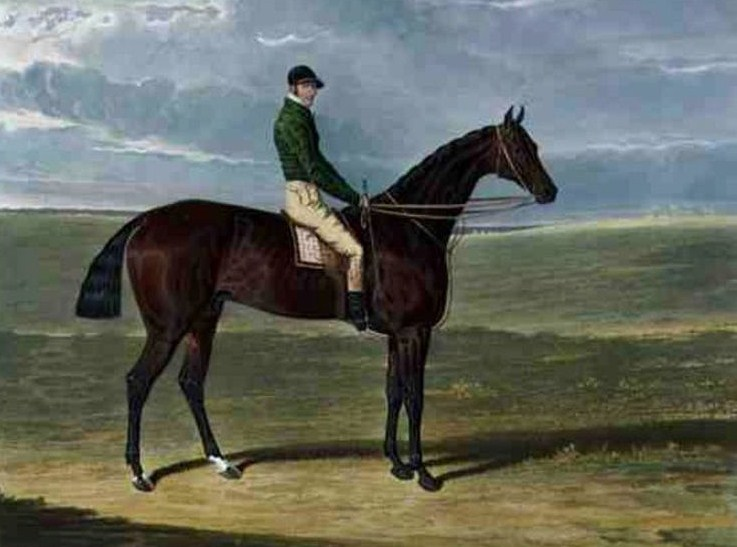
- Priam. Painting by John Frederick Herring, Sr.
- Sire: Emilius
- Grandsire: Orville
- Dam: Cressida
- Damsire: Whiskey
- Sex: Stallion
- Foaled: 1827
- Country: United Kingdom of Great Britain and Ireland
- Colour: Bay
- Breeder: Sir John Shelley
- Owner: William Chifney; George Stanhope, 6th Earl of Chesterfield
- Trainer: William Chifney; John Kent
- Record: 19:17-1-1

Major wins
- Riddlesworth Stakes (1830); Epsom Derby (1830); Craven Stakes (1831); Port Stakes (1831); Goodwood Cup (1831, 1832)

Honours
- Leading sire in Great Britain and Ireland (1839, 1840); Leading sire in North America (1842, 1844, 1845, 1846)

Priam (1827–1847) was a British Thoroughbred racehorse and sire. In a career that lasted from April 1830 to July 1832 he ran nineteen times and won seventeen races, including four walkovers. Unraced as a two-year-old he won seven of his eight starts in 1830 most notably The Derby. He continued to win major races, including successive runnings of the Goodwood Cup for the next two seasons before being retired to stud. He proved to be a successful sire of winners in both Britain and the United States. Priam was regarded by experts as one of the best horses to have raced in England up to that time.

== Background ==
Priam was a bay horse with two white feet standing 15.3 hands high, bred in Sussex by Sir John Shelley. As a yearling he was bought at auction for 1,000 guineas by William Chifney, who trained racehorses at Newmarket, Suffolk. Chifney owned the colt in partnership with his brother, the jockey Sam Chifney and Maximilian Dilly. He had previously been offered to Lord Jersey, who rejected the colt on the grounds that he looked prone to ringbone.

Priam's sire, Emilius, won the Derby in 1823 and went on to become a successful stallion at the Riddlesworth stud which was owned and run by Thomas Thornhill. Apart from Priam, Emilius’s best winners included Plenipotentiary (Derby), Riddlesworth (2000 Guineas) and Mango (St Leger) and he was British Champion sire in 1830 and 1831. Priam's dam, Cressida was a full sister to the mare Eleanor, who won the 1801 Derby. Cressida had previously produced the 1819 2000 Guineas winner Antar.

== Racing career ==
=== 1830: three-year-old season ===
Priam was slow to mature and the Chifneys, usually hard on their horses, were unwilling to hurry him and so he did not run as a two-year-old. Training problems delayed his preparation in early 1830, including a severe throat infection in March, which left him unable to feed properly for several days. Despite this, he made his debut on 12 April at Newmarket when he ran in the Riddlesworth Stakes, a race which at that time was ranked alongside the British Classic Races in importance. Priam won the race, beating Mahmoud, who went on to finish third in the Derby. Two days later at the same meeting he won the Column Stakes by a short-head from Augustus, after his rider Frank Buckle Jr. was forced to drop the colt to the back of the eight runner field before he could obtain a clear run. At Newmarket's First Spring meeting two weeks later, Augustus won the 2000 Guineas. At the same meeting, Priam was able to "win" two valuable races without running competitively. In each case, all his opponents were withdrawn and he was allowed to walk over and claim prizes of £400 and £450.

At Epsom on 27 May, Priam started the 4/1 favourite for the Derby in a field of twenty-three runners. He was ridden by the veteran Sam Day, as Sam Chifney had already agreed to ride another runner and was unable to break the arrangement. The other leading contenders were Little Red Rover and Brunswicker on 6/1. The race was run in heavy rain, but attracted the customary huge crowd. After a delay of an hour, caused by thirteen or fourteen false starts the race began with Priam being left behind by the other runners. Day quickly made up the ground and was in fifth place behind Little Red Rover as the horses approached the turn into the straight. Day was able to wait until the final furlong before producing Priam with a strong run to take the lead and win by two lengths from Little Red Rover. The Chifney brothers reportedly took £12,000 in winning bets.

On his first appearance after the Derby, Priam ran in a Sweepstakes at Ascot in June. He won easily by two lengths from an unnamed colt, with Mahmoud third.

For Priam's next race he was walked the 130 miles from Newmarket to Doncaster for the St Leger in September. The wet weather of early summer had continued and heavy rain and a thunderstorm on the day of the race left the ground extremely soft and muddy. Ridden by Sam Chifney, Priam was restrained in the middle of the twenty-eight runners before making his challenge in the straight. He took the lead from Emancipator inside the final furlong but was overtaken in the closing stages and beaten half a length by Birmingham, a colt who seemed particularly well-suited by the conditions. Two days after the St Leger, Priam reappeared in a £500 match race against the four-year-old Retriever and won by three lengths: the following day, Retriever beat a strong field in the Doncaster Cup. Priam was also allowed to walk over for the Gascoigne Stakes at the same meeting.

=== 1831: four-year-old season ===
Priam began his four-year-old career at the Craven meeting at Newmarket in April. He won both the Craven Stakes from eight opponents on 4 April and the valuable Port Stakes four days later. He was then bought for 3,000 guineas by George Stanhope, 6th Earl of Chesterfield and transferred to the stable of John Kent. At the next Newmarket meeting Priam ran in a "celebrated" £200 match race against the mare Lucetta, winner of the Ascot Gold Cup. Ridden by Sam Chifney he won by four lengths after tracking the mare for most of the way.

In July, Priam won the Goodwood Cup, beating Fleur de Lis (the winner of the race in 1829 and 1830) and The Oaks winner Variation. In October at Newmarket, Priam walked over for the Cup, when his only rival, Lucetta, was withdrawn. Later that month he ran in a match race for £300 against the 2000 Guineas winner Augustus, who had run him to a short-head in the Column Stakes. Priam conceded sixteen pounds to Augustus and won by a length.

According to one source, he also received the Cup at Heaton Park in a walkover.

=== 1832: five-year-old season ===
Priam was sent to the Craven meeting again in 1832, but incurred his first defeat since the 1830 St Leger when he was beaten in the Craven Stakes, finishing third to Chapman and Captain Arthur. At the next Newmarket meeting in May he won a King's Plate, beating Lucetta.

At Ascot in June, he won the Eclipse Foot over two and a half miles, beating his half-brother Sarpedon. In July he ran in his second Goodwood Cup, starting the evens (1/1) favourite against a field that included many of the best horses in training including the Derby winner St. Giles. Carrying top weight of 139 pounds he won from the three-year-old Beiram (108), with St. Giles in fourth.

Priam was retired to stud and failed to appear in three scheduled races, including matches against Camarine and Emancipation, at Newmarket in October.

== Assessment ==
In May 1886 the Sporting Times carried out a poll of one hundred racing experts asking them to name the ten best horses of the 19th century. In July of that year the results of the poll were published as a ranking list. Although his racing career had ended more than fifty years earlier, Priam was ranked twenty-seventh, having been placed in the top ten by nine of the voters. He was the third highest-placed horse of the 1830s behind Bay Middleton and Plenipotentiary. He was regarded by contemporary observers as the best horse to race in England since Eclipse.

== Stud career ==
Priam stood as a stallion at Lord Chesterfield's Bretby Park stud at a fee of 30 guineas. In 1835 he was sold for 3,500 guineas to Dr A. T. B. Merritt and exported to the United States. At his first season at Merritt's Hicks Ford stud in Virginia, he covered at least a hundred mares at a fee of 50 guineas, more than recouping his purchase price. He was later sold to Leonard Cheatham of Tennessee and stood at Robertson's Bend at a fee of $150. Priam was finally moved to General Harding's Belle Meade stud, where he died in 1847. When the progeny he left behind in Britain began to win important races, unsuccessful attempts were made to buy him back.

Foaled	Name	Sex	Major Wins/Achievements
1834	Miss Letty	Mare	Epsom Oaks
1835	Industry	Mare	Epsom Oaks
1837	Crucifix	Mare	1000 Guineas Stakes, 2000 Guineas Stakes, Epsom Oaks

He was British Champion sire in 1839 and 1840 and the Leading sire in North America on four occasions.

== Sire line tree ==
- Priam
  - Chesterfield
    - The Hero
      - Rogerthorpe
      - Raglan
  - Monarch
    - Revenge
  - Prizeflower
  - Rubens
  - Scamander
  - Troilus
  - Bretby
  - Dey Of Algiers
  - Tros
    - Tros
      - Chevalier
  - Young Priam
  - Giges
    - Royal Quand-Meme
      - Pompier
        - Inval
  - Regent
  - Bay Priam
  - Daniel Webster
  - Alexander
  - Lamar
  - Lambda
    - Bob Howard

== Pedigree ==
Pedigree of Priam (GB), bay stallion, 1827
Sire Emilius (GB) 1820	Orville; 1799	Beingbrough	King Fergus^
Sire Emilius (GB) 1820	Orville; 1799	Beingbrough	Fenwick's Herod mare^
Sire Emilius (GB) 1820	Orville; 1799	Evelina	Highflyer*^
Sire Emilius (GB) 1820	Orville; 1799	Evelina	Termagant
Sire Emilius (GB) 1820	Emily; 1810	Stamford	Sir Peter Teazle^
Sire Emilius (GB) 1820	Emily; 1810	Stamford	Horatia^
Sire Emilius (GB) 1820	Emily; 1810	Whiskey mare	Whiskey*
Sire Emilius (GB) 1820	Emily; 1810	Whiskey mare	Grey Dorimant
Dam Cressida (GB) 1807	Whiskey*; 1789	Saltram*	Eclipse*^
Dam Cressida (GB) 1807	Whiskey*; 1789	Saltram*	Virago*
Dam Cressida (GB) 1807	Whiskey*; 1789	Clash*	Herod*
Dam Cressida (GB) 1807	Whiskey*; 1789	Clash*	Teresa*^
Dam Cressida (GB) 1807	Young Giantess; 1790	Diomed	Florizel^
Dam Cressida (GB) 1807	Young Giantess; 1790	Diomed	sister to Juno
Dam Cressida (GB) 1807	Young Giantess; 1790	Giantess	Matchem*^
Dam Cressida (GB) 1807	Young Giantess; 1790	Giantess	Molly Longlegs (Family:6-a)

* Priam is inbred 4S x 2D to the stallion Whiskey, meaning that he appears fourth generation on the sire side of his pedigree and second generation on the dam side of his pedigree.

*^ Priam is inbred 5S x 5S x 4D x 5D to the stallion Herod, meaning that he appears fifth generation twice (via Feneick's Herod mare and Highflyer)^ and fourth generation once and fifth generation once (via Florizel)^ on the dam side of his pedigree.

*^ Priam is inbred 5S x 5S x 4D to the stallion Eclipse, meaning that he appears fifth generation twice (via King Fergus and Horartia)^ and fourth generation once on the dam side of his pedigree.

*^ Priam is inbred 4S x 5S to the stallion Highflyer, meaning that he appears fourth generation and fifth generation (via Sir Peter Teazle)^ on the sire side of his pedigree.

*^ Priam is inbred 5D x 4D to the stallion Matchem, meaning that he appears fifth generation (via Teresa)^ and fourth generation on the dam side of his pedigree.
