= 1805 in sports =

1805 in sports describes the year's events in world sport.

== Boxing ==
Events

- Hen Pearce wins the English championship after defeating Jem Belcher in 18 rounds at Doncaster.
- 8 October — future English champion Tom Cribb narrowly defeats Afro-American Bill Richmond, who was born into slavery.

== Cricket ==
Events

- Lord Frederick Beauclerk is the first batsman known to have scored two first-class centuries in the same season

England

- Most runs – Lord Frederick Beauclerk 468 (HS 129*)
- Most wickets – William Lambert 20

== Horse racing ==
England

- The Derby – Cardinal Beaufort
- The Oaks – Meteora
- St Leger Stakes – Staveley
