= Dennis Fitzpatrick =

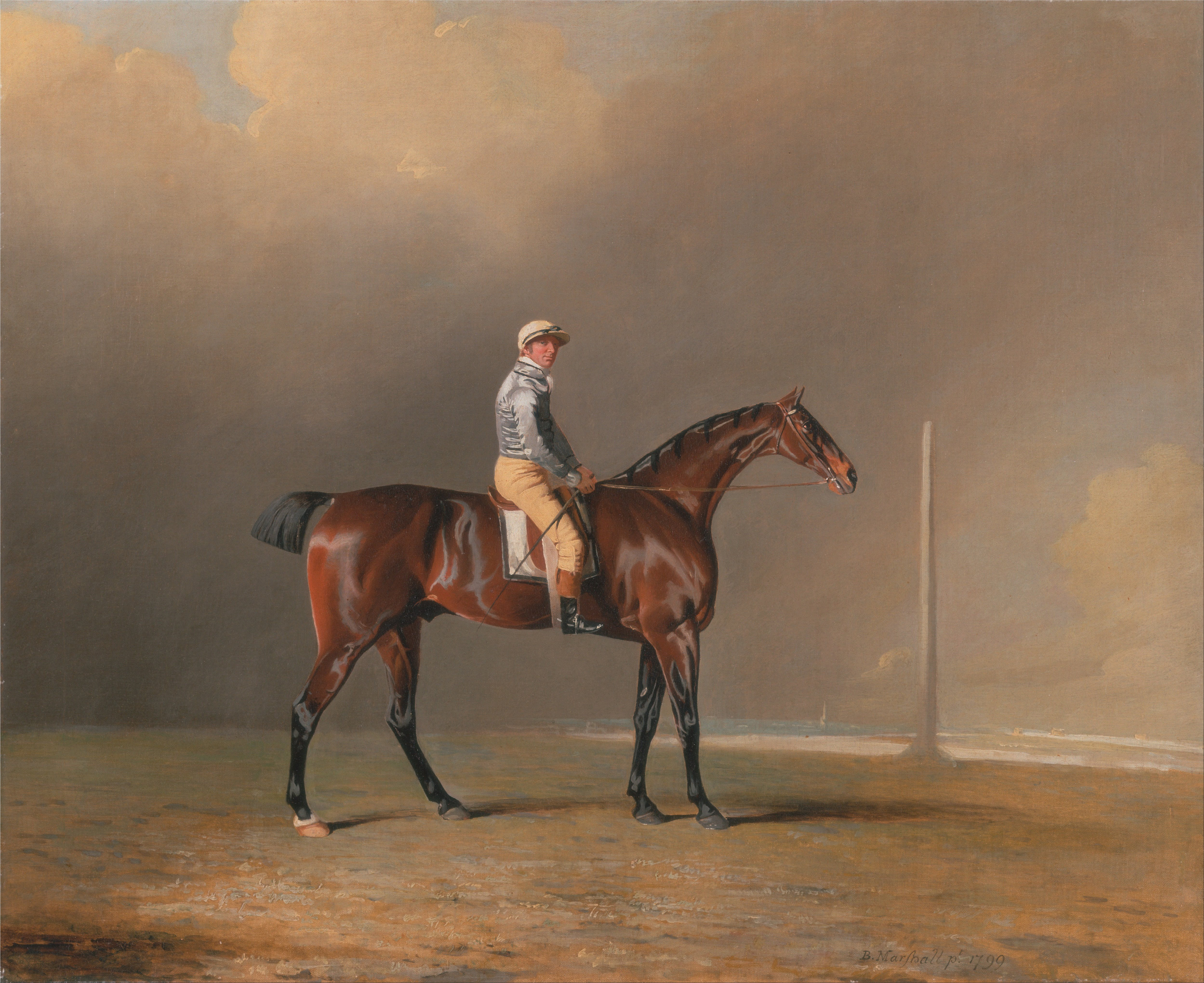
- Diamond, with Dennis Fitzpatrick Up, by Benjamin Marshall (1799)

Personal information
- Born: 1764
- Died: 1806 (aged 41–42)
- Occupation: Jockey

Horse racing career
- Sport: Horse racing

Major racing wins
- Major races Epsom Derby (1805); Epsom Oaks (1787, 1788, 1795, 1800)

Significant horses
- Annette, Cardinal Beaufort, Ephemera, Nightshade, Platina

Dennis Fitzpatrick (1764–1806) was an Irish, five-times British Classic winning jockey. He was the first Irish professional jockey to ride in England and competed in some of the most notable match races of the 19th century versus fellow jockey Frank Buckle.

== Career ==
Fitzpatrick grew up in Ireland, where his father was a tenant farmer of Lord Clermont, and began his riding career there. It was Lord Clermont who brought Fitzpatrick to ride in England, although he would achieve greater success for Lord Egremont, for whom he won the 1805 Derby on Cardinal Beaufort, and three Oaks with Nightshade (1788), Platina (1795) and Ephemera (1800). His first victory in the race came on Annette in 1787. He was also the favourite rider of Mr Cookson and George Watson.

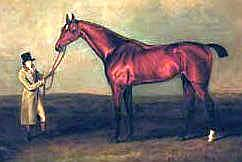
Fitzpatrick's 1805 Derby winner Cardinal Beaufort in a painting by Henry Bernard Chalon, c. 1805.

He was a noted rider of match races, in 1803 famously riding Gaoler to beat Derby winner Orlando, ridden by Frank Buckle, over the Rowley Mile. The pair were the two best mile horses of their day and the defeat was one of only two Orlando faced in twelve races. Another famous match versus Buckle took place at the Newmarket Craven meeting of 1799. Fitzpatrick on Diamond took on Hambletonian, ridden by Buckle, over four miles, one furlong and 138 yards of the Beacon Course, with every vacant room in the town booked up weeks in advance and an unprecedented amount of betting activity, estimated at 250,000 guineas. Diamond went down by half a neck to his opponent for the 3,000 guinea prize. He also met Buckle in a match between Timothy and Warter, Fitzpatrick riding the former in "one of the best races ever rode [sic]". For his own part, Buckle considered Fitzpatrick to be a superior jockey, who along with Sam Chifney Sr. was a "model of perfection".

However, Fitzpatrick's career and life were cut short in their prime. Only one year after his Derby success, the wasting regime he undertook to control his riding weight brought on a cold that killed him.

== Major wins ==
(United Kingdom) Great Britain

- Epsom Derby - Cardinal Beaufort (1805)
- Epsom Oaks - (4) - Annette (1787), Nightshade (1788), Platina (1795), Ephemera (1800)

== Bibliography ==
- Egan, Pierce (1836). Pierce Eganʼs Book of Sports, and Mirror of Life Embracing the Turf, the Chase, the Ring and the Stage, interspersed with Original Memoirs of Sporting Men, etc. London: Thomas Tegg and Son.
- Mortimer, Roger; Onslow, Richard; Willett, Peter (1978). Biographical Encyclopaedia of British Racing. London: Macdonald and Jane's. ISBN 0-354-08536-0.
- Tanner, Michael; Cranham, Gerry (1992). Great Jockeys of the Flat. Enfield, Middlesex: Guinness Publishing. ISBN 0-85112-989-7.
