= Dick Goodisson =

English C18-19 jockey and trainer

Personal information
- Born: c. 1750 Selby, North Yorkshire, England
- Died: 9 September 1817 Newmarket, Suffolk, England
- Occupation: Jockey

Horse racing career
- Sport: Horse racing

Major racing wins
- British Classic Races: Oaks Stakes (1779, 1780, 1781)

Significant horses
- Bridget
- Updated on 23 February 2022

Richard Goodisson (c. 1750 – 1817) was an English classic-winning jockey and trainer, who won the first three runnings of the Oaks Stakes between 1779 and 1781.

== Career ==
Born in Selby, Goodisson moved south to Newmarket, Suffolk, like fellow Yorkshire jockey John Shepherd, to further his career and seek better money. There, he gained the attention of the Duke of Queensberry, for whom he would ride and train until the Duke's retirement from racing interests in 1806. The partnership was only interrupted by a three-week disagreement, during which the Duke, having booked Goodisson to ride his horse, opted at the last minute to ride him himself. When the Duke died in 1810, he left Goodisson £2,000.

Goodisson's most notable victory was the first Oaks Stakes for Lord Derby, after whose residence the race was named, in 1779 on the bay filly Bridget at odds of 5/2. He then won the two following runnings – on Tetotum in 1780 and on Lord Grosvenor's filly Faith in 1781.

He shared an intense rivalry with fellow jockey Sam Chifney. After one particularly rough race, the two became involved in a brawl, during which they both ended up using their whips on the other. A formal boxing match was arranged to settle the affair. It took place for a stake of 25 guineas on New Year's Day 1799 inside a roped ring in a room in the Duke of Queensberry's house. The fight lasted over an hour, with the stamina of Goodisson – the heavier and stronger man – winning out over Chifney, the cleverer boxer. Following the fight, they became and remained friends for the rest of their careers.

== Style and reputation ==
Goodisson was said to have had a "flash of lightning style at the post" , as well as being "unsubtle but effective".

He gained the nickname 'Hellfire Dick' because of his use of profanity and was also known for his unkempt appearance, developing a reputation as "the most slovenly jockey in Newmarket". He was known to carry around £500 in cash in his pocket, a legacy of having once missed out on a successful bet for that amount because he had not had the money.

== Personal life ==
Goodisson married Jane Bentley with whom he had four sons – William, John, Thomas and Charles – and two daughters, Catherine and Ann. The latter two sons became jockeys like their father. Tom won the Derby four times, though Charles predeceased his father, dying in 1813 at the age of 27. Goodisson died on 9 September 1817 in Newmarket.

== Major wins ==
(United Kingdom) Great Britain

- Oaks Stakes - (3) - Bridget (1779), Tetotum (1780), Faith (1781)

== See also ==
- List of jockeys
- List of significant families in British horse racing

== Bibliography ==
- Mortimer, Roger; Onslow, Richard; Willett, Peter (1978). Biographical Encyclopaedia of British Racing. London: Macdonald and Jane's. ISBN 0-354-08536-0.
- Tanner, Michael; Cranham, Gerry (1992). Great Jockeys of the Flat. Enfield, Middlesex: Guinness Publishing. ISBN 0-85112-989-7.
- Barrett, Norman, ed. (1995). The Daily Telegraph Chronicle of Horse Racing. Enfield, Middlesex: Guinness Publishing. ISBN 0-85112-649-9.
- Thompson, Laura (2000). Newmarket: from James I to the present day. London: Virgin Books. ISBN 978-1-85227-853-3.
