= Sam Chifney =

Sam Chifney might refer to:

- Samuel Chifney Sr. (c. 1753–1807), also known as Sam Chifney the elder, an English jockey; or his son,
- Samuel Chifney Jr., also an English jockey
