= Cardinal Beaufort (horse) =

British Thoroughbred racehorse

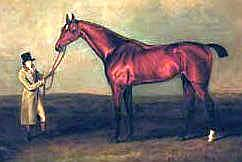
- Cardinal Beaufort in a painting by Henry Bernard Chalon, c. 1805.
- Sire: Gohanna
- Grandsire: Mercury
- Dam: Colibri
- Damsire: Woodpecker
- Sex: Stallion
- Foaled: 1802
- Country: United Kingdom of Great Britain and Ireland
- Colour: Bay
- Breeder: Lord Egremont
- Owner: 1) 3rd Earl of Egremont; 2) William Ladbroke; 3) Mr. S. Arthur; 4) Mr. Arthur Shakespear; 5) Colonel H. F. Mellish; 6) Francis Lloyd; 7) William Shakespear; 8) General Leveson Gower
- Trainer: Francis Neale
- Record: 18: 8–9-0

Major wins
- Epsom Derby (1805)

Cardinal Beaufort (1802– January 1809) was a Thoroughbred racehorse that won the 1805 Epsom Derby. Cardinal Beaufort raced until he was six-years-old, winning eight races before his death in late 1808. Cardinal Beaufort was bred by the Earl of Egremont who raced him during his early career. Cardinal Beaufort was sold frequently in his later racing career, changing hands seven times in the last two years of his life.

== Background ==
Cardinal Beaufort was foaled in 1802 at Lord Egremont's estate Petworth House. Cardinal Beaufort's sire, Gohanna, was also owned by Egremont and was second to Waxy in the 1793 Epsom Derby. In addition to Cardinal Beaufort, Gohanna also sired Election, the winner of the 1807 Derby. Cardinal Beaufort's dam, Colibri (foaled in 1793), was a full sister to the mare Young Camilla, the grandam of St. Leger winner Altisidora and Epsom Oaks winner Manuella. Colibri was bred by Lord Egremont and was sired by the successful stallion Woodpecker. Cardinal Beaufort was Colibri's third foal and one of two sired by Gohanna, the other being Canopus. She produced four foals, dying at ten-years of age in 1803 two weeks after foaling Canopus. Canopus later sired an unnamed mare (the Canopus Mare) that produced the Derby winners Lap-dog and Spaniel.

Cardinal Beaufort was painted by Henry Bernard Chalon during his racing career, and from Chalon's depiction, he was a large bay horse with a white star on his forehead and one white sock on his left hind foot.

== Racing career ==
Cardinal Beaufort did not race as a two-year-old and his most important race win was in the Epsom Derby. He had several owners over his three-year racing career and died at the beginning of his seven-year-old year in 1809. Cardinal Beaufort was trained by Frank Neale at Newmarket.

=== 1805: three-year-old season ===
Cardinal Beaufort's first career start was in The Derby held on 30 May. Fifteen horses started in the race won by Cardinal Beaufort, ridden by Dennis Fitzpatrick, with Lord Grosvenor's colts Plantagenet second and Goth third. Lord Egremont won the Derby for the third time with Cardinal Beaufort, having won the year previously with Hannibal and in 1782 with Assassin. He won the Derby twice more, with Election in 1807 and with Lap-dog in 1826. The running was also notable for a collision between Mr. Best's colt by Dungannon and a group of spectators on horseback that had crossed the racetrack before all of the Derby horses had finished the race. The colt's jockey, B. Norton, was "much bruised by the fall."

At Brighton on 26 July, Cardinal Beaufort won the Pavilion Stakes beating Charles Bunbury's filly Lydia (a full-sister to the 1801 Derby winner Eleanor) and the colt Jasper while carrying seven more pounds than the other runners as a handicap for his win in the Derby. A few days later, Cardinal Beaufort beat Lord Barrymore's colt Merryman in a match race. At Lewes on 1 August, Cardinal Beaufort was second in a 130-guinea sweepstakes race, losing to Lord Darlington's unnamed colt by Sir Peter Teazle. A few days later at the same meeting, Cardinal Beaufort was beaten by the colt Walton for the 60-guinea Ladies' Plate in his last start of the season.

=== 1806: four-year-old season ===
Lord Egremont sold Cardinal Beaufort at the beginning of his four-year-old season to William Ladbroke. He first ran for his new owner at the Newmarket First Spring Meeting on 24 April, losing a match race to Colonel Mellish's colt Staveley. In May at the second Newmarket meeting Ladbroke received an unspecified amount forfeiture from Sir Shelley's colt Sir Launcelot. A few days later at the same meeting, Cardinal Beaufort forfeited a match race with Staveley, paying Colonel Mellish 400 guineas. At Ascot, Cardinal Beaufort finished second in the 150-guinea Swinley Stakes to the colt Hippomenes. Ladbroke sold Cardinal Beaufort to Mr. Arthur before the Newmarket October Meeting, where Cardinal Beaufort won a match race against the 1806 Derby winner Paris. At the same meeting on 2 October, Cardinal Beaufort ran a dead heat with Lord Foley's colt Little Peter in a 200-guinea match race and on 15 October lost a match race to the filly Parasol. At the Newmarket-Houghton meeting on 27 October, Cardinal Beaufort beat the colt Dreadnought in a mile-long match race.

=== 1807: five-year-old season ===
Mr. S. Arthur sold Cardinal Beaufort after the 1806 racing season to Mr. Arthur Shakespear. In April at Newmarket, Cardinal Beaufort received an unspecified amount forfeiture from Lord Darlington's horse Zodiac. Arthur Shakespear sold Cardinal Beaufort to Colonel Mellish at the spring meeting. In his first race under Mellish's ownership, Cardinal Beaufort lost a match race against General Gower's colt Swinley but won a match race against Charles Bunbury's colt Snug a few days later. At the Second Spring Meeting at Newmarket on 27 April, Cardinal Beaufort lost a match race to the mare Meteora and was second in the 50-guinea Jockey-Club Plate to Lord Darlington's colt Pavilion. At Brighton in August, Cardinal Beaufort forfeited a match race against the colt Musician and was second "by about a head" to Sir David in a 200-guina, four-mile match race. Mellish sold Cardinal Beaufort to Francis Lloyd sometime between August and October 1807, with Cardinal Beaufort forfeiting a match race with Ipswich and the Oatlands Stakes under Lloyd's name. At the Houghton Meeting, Cardinal Beaufort received 75 guineas from Mr. Payne after his colt Tudor forfeited a match race and was beaten in a match race by the filly Epsom Lass.

=== 1808: six-year-old season and death ===
At the beginning of the 1808 racing season, Cardinal Beaufort ran in William Shakespear's name for two races. Cardinal Beaufort was fourth in the first class of the Oatlands Stakes at the Craven meeting in April, losing to the filly Nymphina and the horses Hawk and Cerberus.

For the last two races of his career, Cardinal Beaufort ran in General H. F. Gower's name. At Newmarket on 10 May, Cardinal Beaufort won a 100-guinea sweepstakes race against Meteora and Captain Absolute. At Brighton on 2 August, Cardinal Beaufort received a 100-guinea forfeiture from Mr. Daly's colt Sasenagh. Cardinal Beaufort was listed as "dead" in the index of the 1808 edition of The Racing Calendar, having died in late January before the start of the 1809 season in April. At Newmarket on 17 April, General Gower paid a forfeiture to Lord Sackville's horse Bustard due to Cardinal Beaufort's death.

== Pedigree ==
Pedigree of Cardinal Beaufort (GB), Bay Colt, 1802
Sire Gohanna (GB) Bay, 1790	Mercury; 1778	Eclipse	Marske
Sire Gohanna (GB) Bay, 1790	Mercury; 1778	Eclipse	Spilletta
Sire Gohanna (GB) Bay, 1790	Mercury; 1778	Tartar Mare	Tartar*
Sire Gohanna (GB) Bay, 1790	Mercury; 1778	Tartar Mare	Sister to Mogul Mare
Sire Gohanna (GB) Bay, 1790	Dundas Herod Mare; 1779	Herod*	Tartar*
Sire Gohanna (GB) Bay, 1790	Dundas Herod Mare; 1779	Herod*	Cypron*
Sire Gohanna (GB) Bay, 1790	Dundas Herod Mare; 1779	Maiden	Matchem
Sire Gohanna (GB) Bay, 1790	Dundas Herod Mare; 1779	Maiden	Pratts Old Mare
Dam Colibri Bay, 1793	Woodpecker; 1773	Herod*	Tartar*
Dam Colibri Bay, 1793	Woodpecker; 1773	Herod*	Cypron*
Dam Colibri Bay, 1793	Woodpecker; 1773	Miss Ramden	Cade
Dam Colibri Bay, 1793	Woodpecker; 1773	Miss Ramden	Lonsdale Mare
Dam Colibri Bay, 1793	Camilla; 1778	Trentham	Gowers Sweepstakes
Dam Colibri Bay, 1793	Camilla; 1778	Trentham	Miss South
Dam Colibri Bay, 1793	Camilla; 1778	Coquette	Compton Barb
Dam Colibri Bay, 1793	Camilla; 1778	Coquette	Sister to Regulus

* Cardinal Beaufort is inbred 3S x 3D to the stallion Herod, meaning that he appears third generation on the sire side of his pedigree and third generation on the dam side of his pedigree.

* Cardinal Beaufort is inbred 4S x 4S x 4D to the stallion Tartar, meaning that he appears fourth generation twice on the sire side of his pedigree and fourth generation once on the dam side of his pedigree.
