= R v Badger =

- Supreme Court of Canada

Hearing: May 1 and 2, 1995 Judgment: April 3, 1996
- Full case name: Wayne Clarence Badger v. Her Majesty the Queen; Leroy Steven Kiyawasew v. Her Majesty the Queen; Ernest Clarence Ominayak v. Her Majesty the Queen
- Citations: [1996] 1 S.C.R. 771
- Docket No.: 23603
- Prior history: Judgment for the Crown in the Court of Appeal for Alberta.
- Ruling: Badger and Kiyawasew: appeal dismissed. Ominayak: appeal allowed.

Holding
- When interpreting a treaty, the following principles apply: 1. A treaty is a solemn promise between the Crown and the various Indian nations.; 2. The Crown must be assumed to intend to fulfil its promises, and no appearance of "sharp dealing" will be tolerated.; 3. Any ambiguities or doubtful expressions must be resolved in favour of the Indians, any limitations on the rights of Indians must be narrowly construed.; 4. The onus of establishing proof of the extinguishment of a treaty or aboriginal rights lies upon the Crown.

Court membership
- Chief Justice: Antonio Lamer; Puisne Justices: Gérard La Forest, Claire L'Heureux-Dubé, John Sopinka, Charles Gonthier, Peter Cory, Beverley McLachlin, Frank Iacobucci, John C. Major

Reasons given
- Majority: Cory J., joined by La Forest, L'Heureux‑Dubé, Gonthier and Iacobucci JJ.
- Concurrence: Sopinka J., joined by Lamer C.J.
- McLachlin and Major JJ. took no part in the consideration or decision of the case.

R v Badger, [1996] 1 S.C.R. 771 is a leading Supreme Court of Canada decision on the scope of aboriginal treaty rights. The Court set out a number of principles regarding the interpretation of treaties between the Crown and aboriginal peoples in Canada.

== Background ==
Wayne Badger, Leroy Kiyawasew, and Ernest Ominayak were Cree and status Indians under the Treaty No. 8. They were each caught hunting for food on private land. Badger was caught near a farm house, Kiyawasew was caught in a farmer's field, while Ominayak was caught in a field of Muskeg. They were charged under the Wildlife Act. At trial the three accused argued that they were entitled to hunt as part of their aboriginal treaty rights. The Crown argued that the Natural Resources Transfer Agreement of 1930 had extinguished the rights granted by Treaty No. 8. The accused were convicted and the convictions were upheld on appeal.

The issues before the Supreme Court were:

1. whether status Indians under Treaty No. 8 have the right to hunt for food on privately owned land which lies within the territory surrendered under that Treaty.
2. whether the hunting rights set out in Treaty No. 8 have been extinguished or modified by the Natural Resources Transfer Agreement.
3. the extent, if any, that sections 26(1) (requiring a hunting licence) and 27(1) (establishing hunting seasons) of the Wildlife Act applied to the accused.

== Reasons of the court ==
Justice Cory, writing for the majority, held that the appeals of Badger and Kiyawasew should be dismissed but Ominayak's appeal should be allowed and a new trial should be directed.

The Treaty, Cory found, granted the right to "pursue their usual vocations of hunting, trapping, and fishing", which was limited by geography and the right of the government to conserve Wildlife.

Cory gave several principles in interpreting treaties:

1. a treaty represents an exchange of solemn promises between the Crown and the various Indian nations.
2. the honour of the Crown is always at stake; the Crown must be assumed to intend to fulfil its promises.
3. any ambiguities or doubtful expressions must be resolved in favour of the Indians and any limitations restricting the rights of Indians under treaties must be narrowly construed.
4. the onus of establishing strict proof of extinguishment of a treaty or aboriginal right lies upon the Crown.

Cory then turned to the issue of the NRTA. He found that it extinguished the right to hunt commercially but not the right to hunt for food.

When interpreting any treaties, they must be given their natural meaning as understood by the Indians at the time that they were signed. The limitation of the hunting treaty should be based on visible, incompatible land use. On this basis, the appeals for Badger and Kiyawasew must be dismissed as they were hunting where it was visibly incompatible with the land use.

Cory considered whether the Wildlife Act, which required hunting licenses, violated their aboriginal right to hunt. He found that it did violate their rights and could not be justified under the Sparrow test.

== See also ==
- The Canadian Crown and First Nations, Inuit and Métis
- Canadian Aboriginal case law
- Numbered Treaties
- Indian Act
- Section Thirty-five of the Constitution Act, 1982
- Indian Health Transfer Policy (Canada)
- List of Supreme Court of Canada cases
