= Blink Bonny =

British-bred Thoroughbred racehorse

- Blink Bonny, painted by Harry Hall
- Sire: Melbourne
- Dam: Queen Mary
- Sex: Mare
- Foaled: 1854
- Country: United Kingdom of Great Britain and Ireland
- Colour: Bay
- Breeder: William I'Anson
- Owner: William I'Anson
- Trainer: William I'Anson
- Record: 19:13-1-2
- Earnings: £

Major wins
- Gimcrack Stakes (1856); Epsom Derby (1857); Epsom Oaks (1857); Lancashire Oaks (1857); Park Hill Stakes (1857)

Blink Bonny (1854–1862) was a British Thoroughbred racehorse and broodmare. In a career that lasted from 1856 to 1858, she ran twenty times and won fourteen races. She was the leading British two-year-old of 1856, when she won eight races including the Gimcrack Stakes at York. In 1857 Blink Bonny won five of her seven races and became the second filly, after Eleanor, to defeat the colts in The Derby. In the same season, racing against her own sex, she won The Oaks, the Lancashire Oaks, and the Park Hill Stakes.

Having retired from racing in 1858, Blink Bonny showed exceptional promise as a broodmare, producing three top class racehorses before her premature death in 1862. Blink Bonny was one of only six fillies to win the Derby, and has been regarded by both contemporary and modern authorities as one of the best fillies in Thoroughbred racing history.

== Background ==
Blink Bonny was a powerfully built bay filly standing 15.2½ hands high with a narrow white blaze and one white fetlock. According to some reports, she was a difficult horse who was unpopular with stable staff on account of her "nasty temper", while others described her as being "remarkably docile." She was bred at Spring Cottage, Malton, North Yorkshire by her owner William I'Anson who also trained the filly at his Hungerford House stable. I'Anson, a Yorkshireman born at Middleham, named the filly after a turnpike-gate in Edinburgh, through which he regularly passed when traveling to England.

Blink Bonny was sired by Melbourne, a useful but unexceptional racehorse who became a hugely successful stallion, described by the Farmer's Magazine as "far away the best" of his time: apart from Blink Bonny, he sired the Classic winners West Australian, Sir Tatton Sykes, Canezou (1000 Guineas), Marchioness (Oaks), Mentmore Lass (1000 Guineas) and Cymba (Oaks). He was Champion sire in 1853 and 1857. Her dam, Queen Mary, was one of the most important broodmares of the nineteenth century. She was "a queer-tempered mare, very wild in the paddock, and blowing defiance to any stranger who approaches her or hers." Apart from producing many good winners, her influence has continued to the present day, with her direct descendants including the 2002 European Horse of the Year Rock of Gibraltar.

== Racing career ==
=== 1856: two-year-old season ===
As a two-year-old, I'Anson ran Blink Bonny eleven times. She made her first appearance at York on 22 April when she finished third in the Zetland Stakes and she was third again in the Mostyn Stakes at Chester in May. Two weeks later she recorded her first win in the Sapling Stakes at Manchester. Blink Bonny then won her next four races, taking the Bishop Burton Stakes at Beverley, the Tyro Stakes at Newcastle, the Great Lancashire Produce Stakes at Liverpool and the Bentinck Memorial Stakes at Goodwood. She was sent to York in August where she was beaten by Lady Hawthorn in the Convivial Stakes, but won the Gimcrack Stakes two days later, beating the good colts M. D. and Skirmisher. She ran twice at the St Leger meeting at Doncaster in September, winning the Filly Stakes and a Sweepstakes in which she gave four pounds to colts including Adamas and Skirmisher.

Blink Bonny earned a total of £2,201 during her first season. I'Anson turned down several offers for the filly, who went into the winter break as the favourite for the following year's Derby.

=== 1857: three-year-old season ===
During the winter of 1856–57, Blink Bonny developed severe problems with her teeth ("dentition fever") which left her unable to eat normally. Stable staff had to hand-feed the filly on clover and other green stuff but she lost a great deal of weight before she recovered. Her status as favourite for the Derby made her a potential target for gamblers and bookmakers who stood to lose money if she were to succeed, and I'Anson reportedly purchased a ferocious bloodhound to patrol and guard the stables. As a result of the filly's problems, I'Anson was unable to train her as thoroughly as he would have wished, but nevertheless entered her for the 1000 Guineas at Newmarket, believing that she could win without being fully fit. She started favourite, at odds of 4/5 in a field of eight fillies. Blink Bonny tracked the leaders in the early stages, but two furlongs from the finish she began to show "symptoms of defeat" and faded to finish fifth behind Imperieuse.

Blink Bonny (center) in the paddock at Epsom

Blink Bonny's defeat at Newmarket led to a loss in public confidence, and at Epsom on 1 June she started at odds of 20/1 in a field of thirty for the Derby. After a number of false starts, the race got under way and Blink Bonny, ridden by John "Jack" Charlton, was among the leading group from the start and was one of nine horses disputing the lead early in the straight. The filly hit the front a furlong out and prevailed by a neck from the 200/1 outsider Black Tommy in a "blanket finish", with the first six horses crossing the line in a group. The winning time of 2:45.0 broke the race record by three seconds. Her victory was met with surprise and disappointment by the professional gamblers, many of whom had lost heavily on the result. Two days after winning the Derby, Blink Bonny reappeared in the Oaks, for which she started the 4/5 favourite against twelve other fillies including Imperieuse. She was towards the rear in the early stages but moved up to take the lead two furlongs from the finish and won, according to the Sporting Review, with "ridiculous ease" by at least eight lengths from Sneeze, with the other runners, including Imperieuse, finishing "at long intervals."

Following her double at Epsom, Blink Bonny walked over to win a sweepstakes at Royal Ascot on Gold Cup day in June, when no other horses opposed her. On 15 July she started at odds of 1/5 for the Lancashire Oaks at Liverpool and won easily, giving weight to her three opponents. She also won another Bentinck Memorial Stakes at Goodwood later in July, beating her only rival, the colt Chevalier d'Industrie, by twenty lengths.

In September, Blink Bonny attempted to win her third classic when she was sent to Doncaster for the St Leger. Blink Bonny's presence was credited for attracting an enormous number of people, including the writers Charles Dickens and Wilkie Collins, to Doncaster, all of them reportedly anxious to see "so extraordinary an animal." She started 5/4 favourite but after leading briefly in the straight she finished only fourth of the eleven runners behind Imperieuse, having been given a poor ride by Charlton. It was widely believed that Charlton had deliberately "pulled" the filly (prevented her from winning) on the orders of the bookmaker John Jackson. The ill-feeling came to a head when Blink Bonny, carrying a ten pounds higher weight, ran in the Park Hill Stakes a day later over the same course and distance. She won easily by six lengths in a time that was two seconds faster than that set by Imperieuse in winning the St Leger the previous day. The crowd, believing that the result proved that Blink Bonny had been pulled in the classic, attacked the horse's connections. Only the intervention of the former prize-fighters John Gully and Tom Sayers prevented "Little Jack" Charlton from being "torn to pieces" by angry spectators. An estimated 2,000 people became involved in the disturbances and Blink Bonny herself had to be escorted from the scene by an impromptu bodyguard formed by former police officers. The incident came to be known as the "Blink Bonny riot".

=== 1858: four-year-old season ===
Blink Bonny's first run as a four-year-old in the Bentinck Memorial at Goodwood was much-anticipated, but she looked unimpressive before the start and ran so poorly in the race that she was pulled up shortly after half way.

Rumours that she had died of "inflammation of the lungs", which appeared in some newspapers after a report in the Edinburgh Courant, proved to be incorrect and she was retired to stud in good health.

== Assessment ==
In May 1886 The Sporting Times carried out a poll of one hundred racing experts to create a ranking of the best British racehorses of the 19th century. Blink Bonny was ranked twenty-second, having been placed in the top ten by twelve of the contributors. She was rated the fourth best filly, behind Virago, Plaisanterie and Crucifix.

Blink Bonny has been described by Thoroughbred Heritage as "one of the greatest 3-year-old fillies of all time." The Irish Metropolitan Magazine called her "the most wonderful filly ever seen on our turf."

== Stud career ==
Blink Bonny was retired to her owner's stud where she produced only three foals, all of whom showed top class form. Her first foal, Borealis, a filly by Newminster, finished third in the Oaks. She went on to become an important broodmare, being the direct female ancestor of Bayardo and Lemberg. Blink Bonny's second foal, Blair Athol, was one of the outstanding racehorses of his era, winning the Derby and the St Leger in 1864. Her third and final foal, Breadalbane, by Stockwell, won the Prince of Wales's Stakes and finished third in the Ascot Gold Cup.

Blink Bonny died as an eight-year-old in 1862, shortly after giving birth to Breadalbane, who was raised by a foster-mare. Her jockey, John Charlton, died of consumption a few months after Blink Bonny on 31 July. I'Anson donated her skeleton to York Museum where it was mounted and displayed. Two of her hooves are displayed in a glass cabinet at the Blink Bonny pub at Christon Bank, near Embleton, Northumberland.

== Pedigree ==
Pedigree of Blink Bonny (GB), bay mare, 1854
Sire Melbourne (GB) 1834	Humphrey Clinker; 1822	Comus	Sorcerer
Sire Melbourne (GB) 1834	Humphrey Clinker; 1822	Comus	Houghton Lass
Sire Melbourne (GB) 1834	Humphrey Clinker; 1822	Clinkerina	Clinker
Sire Melbourne (GB) 1834	Humphrey Clinker; 1822	Clinkerina	Pewett
Sire Melbourne (GB) 1834	Cervantes mare 1825	Cervantes	Don Quixote
Sire Melbourne (GB) 1834	Cervantes mare 1825	Cervantes	Evelina
Sire Melbourne (GB) 1834	Cervantes mare 1825	Golumpus mare	Golumpus
Sire Melbourne (GB) 1834	Cervantes mare 1825	Golumpus mare	Paynator mare
Dam Queen Mary (GB) 1843	Gladiator; 1833	Partisan	Walton
Dam Queen Mary (GB) 1843	Gladiator; 1833	Partisan	Parasol
Dam Queen Mary (GB) 1843	Gladiator; 1833	Pauline	Moses
Dam Queen Mary (GB) 1843	Gladiator; 1833	Pauline	Quadrille
Dam Queen Mary (GB) 1843	Plenipotentiary mare 1840	Plenipotentiary	Emilius
Dam Queen Mary (GB) 1843	Plenipotentiary mare 1840	Plenipotentiary	Harriet
Dam Queen Mary (GB) 1843	Plenipotentiary mare 1840	Myrrha	Whalebone
Dam Queen Mary (GB) 1843	Plenipotentiary mare 1840	Myrrha	Gift (Family:10)

== As a museum object ==
After her death, Blink Bonny's skeleton was donated to the Yorkshire Museum and was on display until the 1950s. She was on display with the skeleton of another racehorse – Tracery. In 1979 it was reported that one of these skeletons was reburied in an 'archaeological trench' by then Keeper of the museum George Willmot and the location of the other was a mystery.
