= Staveley (horse) =

British-bred Thoroughbred racehorse

- Sire: Shuttle
- Grandsire: Young Marske
- Dam: Drone mare
- Damsire: Drone
- Sex: Stallion
- Foaled: 1802
- Country: United Kingdom
- Colour: Bay or Brown
- Breeder: William Fletcher
- Owner: William Fletcher; Colonel Harry Mellish
- Trainer: Bartle Atkinson
- Record: 19: 7-7-3

Major wins
- St Leger Stakes (1805); Match against Cardinal Beaufort (1806); Jockey Club Plate (1806); Match against Pavilion (1807)

Staveley (1802 – December 1813) was a British Thoroughbred racehorse and sire best known for winning the classic St Leger Stakes in 1805. Bred in Yorkshire, he won seven of his nineteen races in a career which lasted from April 1805 until September 1807. As a three-year-old in 1805, he won his first three races, culminating with a victory at odds of 6/1 in the St Leger at Doncaster Racecourse. In the following season he was transferred to race at Newmarket, Suffolk, where he achieved mixed results, being beaten in most of his races but winning a match against The Derby winner Cardinal Beaufort. He won two further races in 1807 before being retired to stud in Yorkshire. He had no impact as a breeding stallion.

== Background ==
Staveley was a bay or brown horse bred by William Fletcher at Boroughbridge, and was the third of fifteen foals produced by his dam, an unnamed mare sired by Drone. Staveley's sire, Shuttle, owned by Henry Tempest Vane, was best known as the loser of a famous 1000 guinea match race at Doncaster. He stood as stallion at Middlethorpe, North Yorkshire, where he proved highly popular, covering up to seventy mares a year. Staveley was one of his first foals to appear on the racecourse. Shuttle sired several other good broodmares and racehorses including Middlethorpe and Pope (known as Shuttle Pope to distinguish him from the 1809 Derby winner).

Staveley began his racing career in the ownership of his breeder, but as a three-year-old he was sold to Colonel Henry Mellish, a veteran of the Peninsular War, who engaged in duelling, prize-fighting and dog-fighting. His enthusiasm for racing of any kind was such that he once trained a racing pig and gambled on which of two raindrops would be the first to reach the bottom of a window-pane. Staveley was trained by the former jockey Bartle Atkinson. The village of Staveley, North Yorkshire lies four miles south-west of Boroughbridge, and was the likely inspiration of the colt's name.

== Racing career ==
=== 1805: three-year-old season ===
Staveley made his first appearance on 18 April at Catterick Bridge Racecourse. He started favourite for a Produce sweepstakes and won from Barouche, a black colt owned by Sir William Gerard. On 24 May at York Racecourse started the 4/6 favourite for a sweepstakes over one and a half miles and won from Lord Fitzwilliam's Caleb Quotem. Following the York meeting, Fletcher reportedly rejected an offer of 1,500 guineas for the colt, but sold him to Colonel Mellish for 2,000 guineas shortly afterwards.

Four months after his last appearance, Staveley was one of ten colts and fillies to contest the thirtieth running of the St Leger at Doncaster. Ridden by John Jackson, he was the 6/1 fourth choice in the betting behind Cleveland, Hippomenes and Sir Launcelot. Staveley won the classic, beating Caleb Quotem, with Lord Fitzwilliam's Sir Paul in third to give Mellish a second successive victory in the race following Sancho in 1804. On the day after his St Leger, Staveley ran in an all-aged sweepstakes over four miles in which he finished last of the five runners behind William Garforth's grey mare Marcia.

=== 1806: four-year-old season ===
As a four-year-old in 1806, Staveley was campaigned exclusively at Newmarket, beginning with three races at the Craven meeting in April. He was beaten in 100 guinea match race over the Abington Mile, by Mr Arthur's horse Brainworm, to whom he was conceding nine pounds, finished second in the Oatlands Stakes, a handicap race over the two mile Ditch-In course and was beaten by Lord Grosvenor's Epsom Oaks winner Meteora in a ten furlong match. His performances led to comments that Mellish may have paid too much for the colt and that Staveley had been asked to carry too much weight.

At the First Spring meeting two weeks later he was pitted against the 1805 Epsom Derby winner Cardinal Beaufort in a match race over the Abington mile. Despite conceding five pounds to his rival and being opposed in the betting, Staveley won the match easily to claim a prize of 500 guineas. At the Second Spring meeting in early May, Staveley was beaten by Mr Arthur's five-year-old in a match over the Abington Mile, before contesting the Jockey Club Plate over the four mile Beacon Course. Ridden by a stable lad ("a boy") Staveley started at odds of 4/1 and won "a good race" from Mr Radcliffe's colt Barbarossa and the Duke of Grafton's six-year-old mare Parasol.

Staveley returned in the autumn of 1806 for the First October meeting, where he started favourite for a race over the Beacon Course but finished third behind Orville (the 1802 St Leger winner) and Parasol. He was later beaten in one mile match races by Brainworm at the Second October meeting and by Lord Darlington's five-year-old horse Pavilion at the Houghton meeting. He ended his season by finishing unplaced in a subscription handicap on 31 October.

In addition to the above contests, Staveley was engaged in five match races which did not take place. On two occasions his owner paid a forfeit when he failed to appear for the match, and on three occasions the forfeit was paid by the owners of his scheduled opponent.

=== 1807: five-year-old season ===
Staveley began his final season at the Craven meeting with a match against Pavilion over the Beacon Course on 30 March. Ridden by Frank Buckle, he started the 5/6 favourite and easily reversed the form of their previous meeting to win a prize of 500 guineas. At the First Spring meeting in April, he won again, beating Wormwood and Pagoda "cleverly" in a sweepstakes over the Abington Mile. Later at the meeting, he was beaten by Lord Grosvenor's filly Violante in a handicap over the Ditch-In course.

For his last two races, Staveley returned to Yorkshire. On 26 August he ran at York, where he finished last of the three runners in the City Purse over four miles. In the following month he returned to the scene of his St Leger victory to contest the Doncaster Cup in which he finished third of the four runners behind Scud, a three-year-old colt owned by Lord Monson.

Staveley's owners also paid forfeit once, and received forfeit twice when scheduled match races failed to materialise.

== Stud career ==
Staveley spent his stud career at Blythe, near Bawtry in Yorkshire. His covering fee was five and a half guineas for Thoroughbred mares and two guineas for "country mares". Staveley was found dead in his stall at Blythe in early December 1813. His cause of death was suspected to be poisoning.

== Pedigree ==
Pedigree of Staveley (GB), bay stallion, 1802
Sire Shuttle (GB) 1793	Young Marske; 1771	Marske	Squirt
Sire Shuttle (GB) 1793	Young Marske; 1771	Marske	The Ruby Mare
Sire Shuttle (GB) 1793	Young Marske; 1771	Blank mare	Blank*
Sire Shuttle (GB) 1793	Young Marske; 1771	Blank mare	Bay Starling
Sire Shuttle (GB) 1793	Vauxhall Snap mare 1784	Vauxhall Snap	Snap
Sire Shuttle (GB) 1793	Vauxhall Snap mare 1784	Vauxhall Snap	Cade mare
Sire Shuttle (GB) 1793	Vauxhall Snap mare 1784	Hip	Herod*
Sire Shuttle (GB) 1793	Vauxhall Snap mare 1784	Hip	sister 2 to Mirza
Dam Drone mare (GB) 1790	Drone; 1777	Herod*	Tartar
Dam Drone mare (GB) 1790	Drone; 1777	Herod*	Cypron
Dam Drone mare (GB) 1790	Drone; 1777	Lily	Blank*
Dam Drone mare (GB) 1790	Drone; 1777	Lily	Peggy
Dam Drone mare (GB) 1790	Matchem mare 1777	Matchem	Cade
Dam Drone mare (GB) 1790	Matchem mare 1777	Matchem	sister 2 to Miss Partner
Dam Drone mare (GB) 1790	Matchem mare 1777	Jocasta	Cornforth's Forester
Dam Drone mare (GB) 1790	Matchem mare 1777	Jocasta	Milksop (Family:4)

* Stavely is inbred 4S × 3D to the stallion Herod, meaning that he appears fourth generation on the sire side of his pedigree and third generation on the dam side of his pedigree.

* Staveley is inbred 4S × 4D to the stallion Blank, meaning that he appears fourth generation on the sire side of his pedigree and fourth generation on the dam side of his pedigree.
