= John Charlton (jockey) =

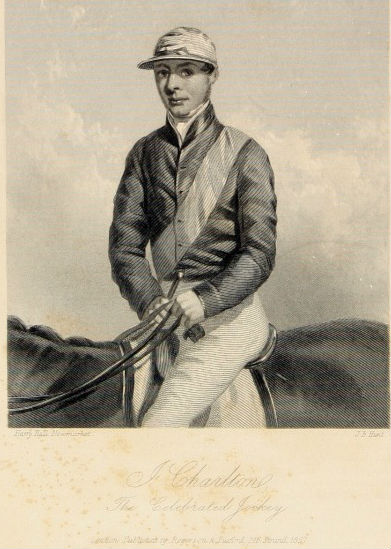

Personal information
- Born: 1829
- Died: 1862 (aged 32–33)
- Occupation: Jockey

Horse racing career
- Sport: Horse racing

Major racing wins
- Major races 1,000 Guineas Stakes (1853); Epsom Derby (1857); Epsom Oaks (1854, 1857)

Significant horses
- Blink Bonny, Mentmore Lass, Mincemeat

John Charlton (1829–1862) was a British jockey, most famous for winning an Oaks/Derby double on Blink Bonny, only the second filly to achieve the feat.

== Early career ==
Charlton was born at Stranton near West Hartlepool to the landlord of the Blacksmith's Arms. Despite this birthplace, he would later come to consider himself "all but Yorkshire".

He trained as a jockey with Bob Johnson in Middleham, then moved to a Mr. Armstrong in Richmond, and then to John Scott in Whitewall, where he completed his training. He rode trials for Scott, and began to race-ride, but the relationship was strained, and Charlton was dismissed from Scott's yard, with a companion, under suspicion that he had "got at" stable favourite Newminster, even though evidence for this is scant.

The dismissal did not hold him back, and his first major successes came in 1853, when he won both the 1,000 Guineas on Mentmore Lass and the Doncaster Cup on Hungerford, both owned by Baron Meyer de Rothschild. Hungerford was Charlton's favourite horse, and as well as the Doncaster Cup, he also won the Northamptonshire Stakes and Great Yorkshire Handicap on it. He also rode the promising, but ultimately disappointing, Orestes.

In 1854, he went very close to a Derby/Oaks double. He won the Oaks on Mincemeat, but could only make second in the Derby on King Tom, although it is suggested he might have won had the horse been fully fit.

When in the south he rode for Rothschild, but while in the north he ended up riding for the I'Anson stable. In 1857, he had a dispute with Baron Rothschild, and took up a ride for William I'Anson – Blink Bonny.

== Blink Bonny ==
Blink Bonny was a bay filly, and though powerfully built and talented, she was unpopular with stable staff at I'Anson's yard at Hungerford House. For the 1,000 Guineas, she started as odds-on favourite, but was comprehensively beaten, and it was suspected she was short of work.

Charlton was booked to ride her in the Derby at Epsom, for which she started at 20/1, in a field of 30. In a close finish, Blink Bonny won by a neck, and several professional punters lost heavily. Two days later, she started 4/5 favourite for the Oaks, and won much more easily, in the process becoming only the second horse after Eleanor to do the double. Following his Derby success, Charlton gave the whip he used to his father-in-law.

Blink Bonny was then targeted at the final classic of the season, the St Leger. A large crowd was in attendance, including the writers Charles Dickens and Wilkie Collins. Starting 5/4 favourite in a field of eleven, Blink Bonny could only finish fourth. It was widely believed that Charlton had deliberately "pulled" the filly, prevented her from winning, on the orders of the bookmaker John Jackson.

This became evident when the next afternoon, Blink Bonny won the Park Hill Stakes over the same course and distance, carrying ten pounds more, by a distance of six lengths, and two seconds faster than Imperieuse, the St Leger winner, the previous day.

This caused unrest in the crowd. In what came to be known as the "Blink Bonny Riot", Charlton was pulled from the horse and would have been assaulted by the mob without the intervention of former prize-fighters John Gully and Tom Sayers. Horse and jockey were eventually escorted from the course by an impromptu bodyguard of friends. Dickens wrote of the incident as "a violent scuffling and a rushing at the jockey, and an emergence of the said jockey from a swaying and menacing crowd, protected by friends, and looking the worse for wear."

== Later life and death ==
Charlton's finest riding feat came when winning the Goodwood Cup on Nancy, beating Alfred Day on Cossack by a head, in a fine display of horsemanship by both men.

On Oaks day 1861, while waiting to ride Bonny Breast Knot, Charlton was persuaded by his medical advisor not to ride. Charlton reluctantly took heed, and his friend John Wells rode instead. Ultimately, Charlton's final ride was on Longshot at Malton on 23 May 1862, only a couple of months before his death.

Charlton died of consumption at Hungerford House on 26 July 1862, aged only 33. Blink Bonny had died just a few months earlier when giving birth. He left effects of less than £1,000 and three months after his death, thieves broke into Hungerford House and took everything. He was survived by his wife Emmeline, the daughter of William Ewbank, who had horses in I'Anson's stables.

== Riding style ==
Charlton was quiet of manner and disposition. He was not a showy or flash horseman, with few peculiarities by which he could be distinguished, although when he won the Ascot Gold Cup on Skirmisher, it was said that "seldom ...[had a race been] ridden in a prettier or more finished style".

At his peak, he was able to ride at 7 stone.

== Major wins ==
(United Kingdom) Great Britain

- 1,000 Guineas Stakes – Mentmore Lass (1853)
- Epsom Derby – Blink Bonny (1857)
- Epsom Oaks – (2) – Mincemeat (1854), Blink Bonny (1857)
