= Samuel Chifney =

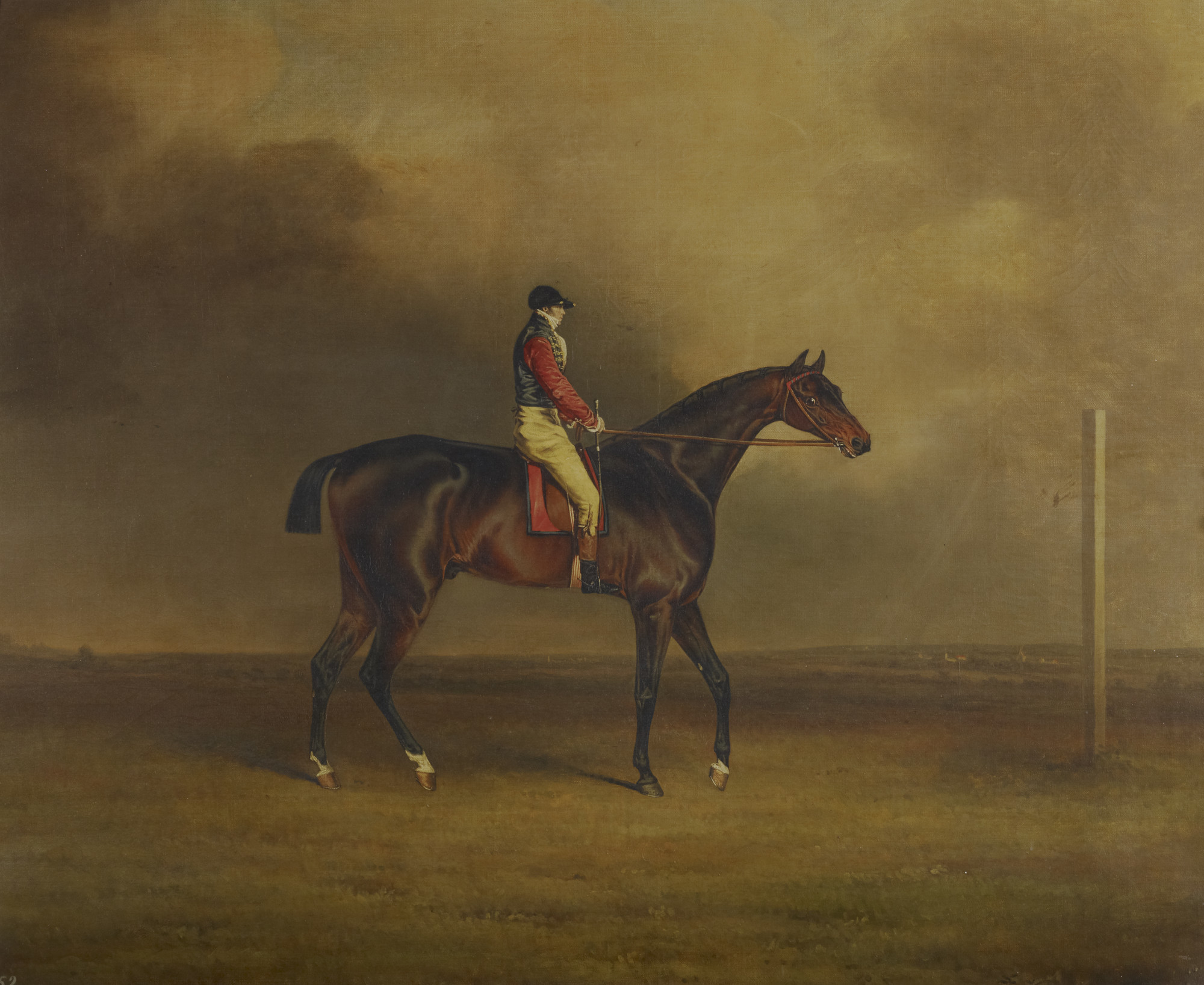
- Samuel Chifney with "Sir David" (by Henry Bernard Chalon)

Personal information
- Born: 1753 Northwold, Norfolk
- Died: 8 September 1807 (aged 53–54) London
- Occupation: Jockey

Horse racing career
- Sport: Horse racing

Major racing wins
- British Classic Race wins: Epsom Derby (1789); Epsom Oaks (1782, 1783, 1789, 1790)

Significant horses
- Skyscraper, Ceres, Hippolyta, Maid of the Oaks, Tag, Escape
- Updated on 11 October 2007

Samuel Chifney (c. 1753 – 8 January 1807), also known as Sam Chifney Sr., Sam Chifney the Elder or Old Sam Chifney to distinguish him from his son, was an English jockey. He was a pioneer of professional race-riding, developing a trademark late finishing style, known as the 'Chifney rush' and was the retained jockey of the Prince of Wales. He became the leading horseman of his day, winning four runnings of the Oaks and one of the Derby, but his career ended in ignominy after a scandal around a ride on the Prince of Wales's horse, Escape. Despite inventing a bit for horses that is still in use today, he died in debtors' prison in London.

== Riding career ==
Chifney was born in Northwold, Norfolk around 1753 and, entering Foxe's stables at Newmarket Racecourse in 1770, soon learned the rudiments of horse racing. He said of himself, "In 1773 I could ride horses in a better manner in a race to beat others than any other person ever known in my time, and in 1775 I could train horses for running better than any person I ever yet saw. Riding I learnt myself and training I learnt from Mr. Richard Prince, training groom to Lord Foley". In 1787 he rode for the Duke of Bedford, and two years later won The Derby on Skyscraper for the Duke. For Lord Grosvenor he won The Oaks on Ceres in 1782, and on Maid of the Oaks in 1783.

In 1789 Chifney rode the winners of both the Derby and the Oaks, riding Skyscraper to victory in the Derby for the Duke of Bedford and Tagg for Lord Egremont in the Oaks, becoming the first man to ride the double. The next year he won the Oaks again, riding Hypolita for the Duke of Bedford.

Few people liked Chifney, many regarding him as an "arrogant little upstart" from Norfolk. He was also known to be something of a dandy, to an extent that bordered on the effeminate, with hair flowing out from the front of his cap, ruffs and frills on his clothing and bunches of ribbons on his boots. This self-confidence and attitude distinguished him as "the first professional jockey as we understand the term", although added to this, he had a reputation for dishonesty – "he dressed like a mannequin, nurtured an ego the size of a house and was as bent as a paper clip."

== Riding style ==
Chifney was an instinctive horseman, whose considered approach contrasted with the untutored 'grooms' who had come before him. He is widely considered to have transformed race-riding, "from a ritual slogging match, to a mounted chess game."

Chifney's style of riding was to keep a slack rein – a method which has never found much favour, but which in his case was successful. He wrote that when pulling up, one should never jerk the mouth of the horse, doing it "as if you had a silken rein, as fine as a hair, and you were afraid of breaking it" and that the horse "should be enticed to ease himself an inch at a time, as his situation will allow." At Guildford for the King's Plate, he was given a heavy bridle for the horse Knowsley, a notoriously hard puller. He is reported to have said, "take away that silly gimcrack and bring me a plain snaffle." He won easily that day, and again at Winchester subsequently. On Eagle, an idle horse that he advised the Duke of Dorset to buy from Sir Frank Standish, he ran in the King's Plate at Newmarket. Standish was so sure that no-one could get the best out of the horse, that he advised Dorset not to back him "for a halfpenny." Chifney responded saying, "I'll let Sir Frank Standish see whether I can get him out or not and what's more, I'll neither use whip nor spur to him." The horse won by a neck, with neither whip nor spur, as Chifney had said.

Another favoured tactic of Chifney's was easing the load on a horse's back by constantly adjusting his seat throughout a race. "Suppose a man had been carrying a stone in one hand, would he not find much ease by shifting it into the other?" he himself argued.

Most distinctively, Chifney was also one of the first to ride a waiting race, coming towards the finish with a tremendous rush. In fact, the idea of saving a horse for a late run became known as the 'Chifney rush'. Chifney's manner of riding has been described thus: "He approached a race as if it were a piece of music, playing it slow and quiet until coming at the end with a beautifully modulated crescendo, sweeping past his one-paced rivals." He was considered the best horseman of his time; at 5 feet 5 inches (1.65 m) tall, he could ride at 7 stone 12 pounds – 110 pounds (50 kg) – reducing from his natural weight of 9 stone 5 pounds during the summer.

He was regarded by fellow jockey, Frank Buckle, as a "model of perfection".

== The Escape scandal ==
On 14 July 1790 Chifney was hired as "rider for life" by the Prince of Wales to ride his racehorses at a salary of 200 guineas a year. However, in the second year of his commission, Chifney became embroiled in a scandal which would ruin his career.

On Thursday 20 October, Chifney rode the Prince's horse, Escape, at Newmarket in a 60 guinea race over two miles of the Ditch in Course. He started as 2/1 on favourite but finished last of four, behind Mr Dawson's Coriander, Lord Grosvenor's Skylark and Lord Clermont's Pipator. The following day at odds of 5/1, Escape then overturned the form to win over four miles of the Beacon Course, ahead of Skylark in third.

Suspicions were immediately raised that Chifney had pulled the horse in the original race to secure a better price for his money on the Friday. Warwick Lake, the Prince's racing manager, fearing the furore that was to break, immediately responded to the Prince, saying, "I give your Royal Highness joy, but I am sorry the horse has won. I would sooner have given a hundred guineas." Charles James Fox wrote in a letter at the time, "... people will suspect".

Chifney was duly summoned before the Jockey Club to explain himself. He stated that the horse had needed the race on the Thursday to "clear his pipes" and, knowing this, he had had no bet on the first run and 20 guineas on the second. The stewards did not accept the explanation and warned the Prince of Wales that if he continued to use Chifney, no gentleman would race against him. In consequence, not wanting to make an example of his jockey, the Prince of Wales sold his stable and ended his connection with the turf. He told Chifney he would be unlikely to return to ownership, "but if I ever do, Sam Chifney, you shall train and manage them. You shall have your 200 guineas a year all the same. I cannot give it to you for your life, I can only give it to you for my own. You have been a good and honest servant to me." Seeing Chifney later at Brighton in 1802, he remarked, "Sam Chifney, there's never been a proper apology made; they [the Jockey Club] used me and you very ill. They are bad people – I'll not set foot on the ground more."

It has been suggested that in the modern day, Chifney's justification for Escape's performance would have been accepted by stewards. Escape had never been a consistent horse, the two races were over different distances and he may indeed have needed a race. Moreover, he had won twice over the Beacon Course in October, but tried over the two-mile Oatlands Stakes at Ascot, he had been beaten into fourth. So, while there may indeed have been sharp practice involved, in the absence of evidence, the explanation would have to be accepted under modern rules. This has led some to conclude that the incident may just have been the opportunity the stewards needed to target Chifney, who had long been under suspicion. Warwick Lake was known to dislike Chifney's influence and arrogance and may, according to Jockey Club member Anthony St Leger, have been the driving force behind the case.

== Later life ==
In 1795 Chifney, in reduced circumstances, wrote and published (or probably had written for him) a book entitled Genius Genuine, by Samuel Chifney of Newmarket. This book, although merely an octavo of 170 pages, sold for £5. Sales must have been adequate, for a second edition appeared in 1804. In 1800, he published The Narrative or Address of Samuel Chifney, Rider for Life to his Royal Highness the Prince of Wales at a price of two shillings sixpence. The year before, he was again castigated for his riding of Mr. Cookson's Sir Harry, but it afterwards became apparent that in this case the horse and not the rider was at fault. Chifney left Newmarket for London in 1800, never to return.

In 1806, he sold his annuity of 200 guineas from the Prince of Wales for £1,260. Chifney invented a bit for horses, which is named after him and still in use. It consists of a curb and two snaffles, and exerts greater pressure on the sides of the horse's mouth. The Chifney bit is sometimes described as an Uppingham bit with pelham cheeks and a snaffle mouth. He had hoped the Jockey Club might fund the bit, saying, "if the Jockey Club will be pleased to give me 200 guineas, I will make them a bridle as I believe never was, and I believe never can be, excelled, for their light weights to hold horses from running away." The Jockey Club never took up the offer, and in connection with his bit he became indebted to a saddler named Latchford for £350. He was committed to Fleet Prison for the debt, and died there aged 52 on 8 January 1807. Chifney is buried at St. Sepulchre-without-Newgate, Holborn.

== Family ==
Chifney married the daughter of Newmarket trainer Frank Smallman. They had two sons, both well known, and four daughters. The elder son, William Chifney (born at Newmarket in 1784), became a trainer at Newmarket. On 31 May 1803 he publicly thrashed Lieutenant-Colonel George Leigh (an equerry to the Prince of Wales) for accusing his father of cheating during the Escape case. For that assault, he was imprisoned for six months in Cambridge. He died in Pancras Square, Pancras Road, London on 14 October 1862.

Chifney's younger son, Samuel, was born in 1786. He also became jockey to the Prince of Wales, first riding for him at the Stockbridge meeting in 1802. He also used the slack-rein technique originated by his father and 'the Chifney rush'. He was five times winner of the Oaks, twice of the Derby and once, aged 57, of the 1,000 Guineas.

One of his daughters married the royal trainer William Butler (c. 1783–1827), and became the mother of the well-known jockey Frank Butler, another married a Mr Weatherby of Newmarket.

== See also ==
- List of significant families in British horse racing

== Bibliography ==
- Mortimer, Roger; Onslow, Richard; Willett, Peter (1978). Biographical Encyclopaedia of British Racing. London: Macdonald and Jane's. ISBN 0-354-08536-0.
- Tanner, Michael; Cranham, Gerry (1992). Great Jockeys of the Flat. Enfield, Middlesex: Guinness Publishing. ISBN 0-85112-989-7.
- Thompson, Laura (2000). Newmarket: from James I to the present day. London: Virgin Books. ISBN 978-1-85227-853-3.
- Wright, Howard (1986). The Encyclopaedia of Flat Racing. London: Robert Hale. ISBN 0-7090-2639-0.
