= Bronze (horse) =

British-bred Thoroughbred racehorse

- Sire: Buzzard
- Grandsire: Woodpecker
- Dam: Alexander mare
- Damsire: Alexander
- Sex: Mare
- Foaled: 1803
- Country: United Kingdom of Great Britain and Ireland
- Colour: Brown
- Breeder: 4th Duke of Queensberry or Augustus Berkeley Craven
- Owner: Augustus Berkeley Craven; Thomas Goddard
- Trainer: R D Boyce
- Record: 21: 6-7-5

Major wins
- Math against Merrythought (1806); Oaks Stakes (1806); Match against Musician (1807); Kingscote Stakes (1808)

Bronze (1803 – July 1827) was a British Thoroughbred racehorse and broodmare who won the classic Oaks Stakes at Epsom Downs Racecourse in 1806. Bronze's classic win left her unbeaten in three starts, but her subsequent racing career was undistinguished: in eighteen more races she recorded only three wins, two of which were at relatively minor tracks. After being retired to stud in 1809 she proved to be a highly successful and influential broodmare, whose direct descendants have won many important races up to the present day.

== Background ==
Bronze was a brown mare bred either by Berkeley Craven (1776–1836), a younger son of William Craven, 6th Baron Craven, who owned her during her early racing career or by the 4th Duke of Queensberry. As a daughter of the stallion Buzzard and the unnamed Alexander mare, Bronze was a full sister to Selim, Rubens and Castrel, three successful racehorses who went on to become influential sires: Selim was Leading sire in Great Britain and Ireland in 1814, Rubens succeeded him in 1815 and Castrel was the direct male ancestor of numerous successful horses including Thormanby and The Tetrarch. Buzzard also sired the St Leger Stakes winner Quiz before being sold and exported to Virginia in 1804.

== Racing career ==
=== 1806: three-year-old season ===
Bronze made her racecourse debut on 8 April 1806 at the Craven meeting at Newmarket Racecourse. She was matched against the Duke of Grafton's filly Merrythought at level weights over the Rowley Mile course. The Duke's filly was favoured in the betting, but Bronze defeated her rival to win a prize of 200 guineas. At the First Spring meeting at the same course two weeks later, Bronze was entered in a Sweepstakes over five furlongs. She won the race from five colts at odds of 3/1. On 23 May, Bronze was one of twelve fillies to contest the Oaks Stakes over one and a half miles at Epsom. The Duke of Grafton's Vanity was made favourite at 7/2, with Bronze the fourth choice in the betting at odds of 10/1. Ridden by W. Edwards, Bronze won the classic from Jerboa and Rosabella with Vanity unplaced.

Bronze's next race was the Egremont Stakes at Brighthelmston on 28 July. She lost her unbeaten record as she finished last of the three runners behind the colts Trafalgar (the runner-up in The Derby) and Canopus. Six days later at Lewes Bronze was beaten in a match race by Sir John Shelley's five-year-old mare Houghton Lass.

=== 1807: four-year-old season ===
Bronze won one of her eight races as a four-year-old and was placed on six occasions. At the Craven meeting she finished third in a Sweepstakes over the two mile "Ditch-In" course. Two weeks later she finished fourth of the eight runners in a King's Plate for fillies and mares over the four mile Beacon Course, finishing ahead of Houghton Lass and Jerboa. At Brighton in August she was beaten by Sir John Shelley's colt Sir Launcelot in a four-mile Sweepstakes and finished second to the Prince of Wales's six-year-old horse Sir David in the Brighton Gold Cup. At Lewes, two days later, she was withdrawn after finishing second in the first heat of a King's Plate won by Sir Launcelot. On 12 October at Newmarket, Bronze ran a match race at level weights against the Duke of Grafton's three-year-old colt Musician. Bronze defeated her younger rival over the ten furlong distance to win the 200 guinea prize. Four days later she was beaten in a match over the same course and distance when attempting to concede twenty pounds to a colt named Ferdinand. On 29 October at the Newmarket Houghton meeting, Bronze ended her season by finishing second to Meteora in the Audley End Stakes.

=== 1808: five-year-old season ===
Before the start of the 1808 season, Bronze entered into the ownership of Thomas Goddard. She raced eight times in the year, winning twice and being placed four times, running mainly in minor races at provincial courses. She made her first appearance of the year at Maddington in Wiltshire on 8 June when she was beaten in a two-mile Sweepstakes by Bucephalus. At Bibury on 5 July she finished last of the five runners in the Sherborne Stakes, carrying a weight of 150 pounds and then finished last of three in a Sweepstakes at the same course two days later. At Stockbridge a week later she ran a dead heat in the first heat of a Maiden Plate, but failed to win the three subsequent heats, eventually finishing third to Timekeeper. In September, Bronze was sent to compete at Kingscote in Gloucestershire. On the opening day of the meeting she won the Kingscote Stakes over three miles, beating four opponents including Bucepahlus. Two days later, carrying a weight of 154 pounds, she finished second to Cambrian, in a Sweepstakes over one mile. Later the same day she finished last of the four runners behind Bucephalus over two miles. Bronze ended her racing career at Chippenham on 27 September in a race run in a series of heats, with the prize going to the first horse to win twice. The mare finished fourth in the first heat, but won the next two heats to win the £50 purse.

== Breeding record ==
Bronze was retired from racing to become a broodmare. She produced twenty-one foals in eighteen years (including four sets of twins) before her death in July 1827. The best of her offspring on the racetrack was her third foal Busto, sired by Clinker, a colt who won the Newmarket Stakes in 1812. It was through Busto's unnamed full sister, foaled in 1816, that Bronze's influence on the Thoroughbred continued. The "Clinker mare/ sister to Busto" was the direct female ancestor of the British classic winners Rosedrop, Gainsborough, Hycilla, Aurelius, Court Martial and Camaree and other major winners including Sea-Bird, Point Given, With Approval, Izvestia, Touch Gold, High Echelon and Teddy.

== Pedigree ==
Pedigree of Bronze (GB), brown mare, 1803
Sire Buzzard (GB) 1787	Woodpecker; 1773	Herod	Tartar
Sire Buzzard (GB) 1787	Woodpecker; 1773	Herod	Cypron
Sire Buzzard (GB) 1787	Woodpecker; 1773	Miss Ramsden	Cade
Sire Buzzard (GB) 1787	Woodpecker; 1773	Miss Ramsden	Lonsdale mare
Sire Buzzard (GB) 1787	Misfortune; 1775	Dux	Matchem
Sire Buzzard (GB) 1787	Misfortune; 1775	Dux	Duchess
Sire Buzzard (GB) 1787	Misfortune; 1775	Curiosity	Snap
Sire Buzzard (GB) 1787	Misfortune; 1775	Curiosity	Regulus mare
Dam Alexander mare 1790	Alexander; 1782	Eclipse	Marske
Dam Alexander mare 1790	Alexander; 1782	Eclipse	Spilletta
Dam Alexander mare 1790	Alexander; 1782	Grecian Princess	Williams' Forester
Dam Alexander mare 1790	Alexander; 1782	Grecian Princess	Coalition colt mare
Dam Alexander mare 1790	Highflyer mare 1780	Highflyer	Herod
Dam Alexander mare 1790	Highflyer mare 1780	Highflyer	Rachel
Dam Alexander mare 1790	Highflyer mare 1780	Alfred mare	Alfred
Dam Alexander mare 1790	Highflyer mare 1780	Alfred mare	Engineer mare (Family 2-n)
