= Frank Butler (jockey) =

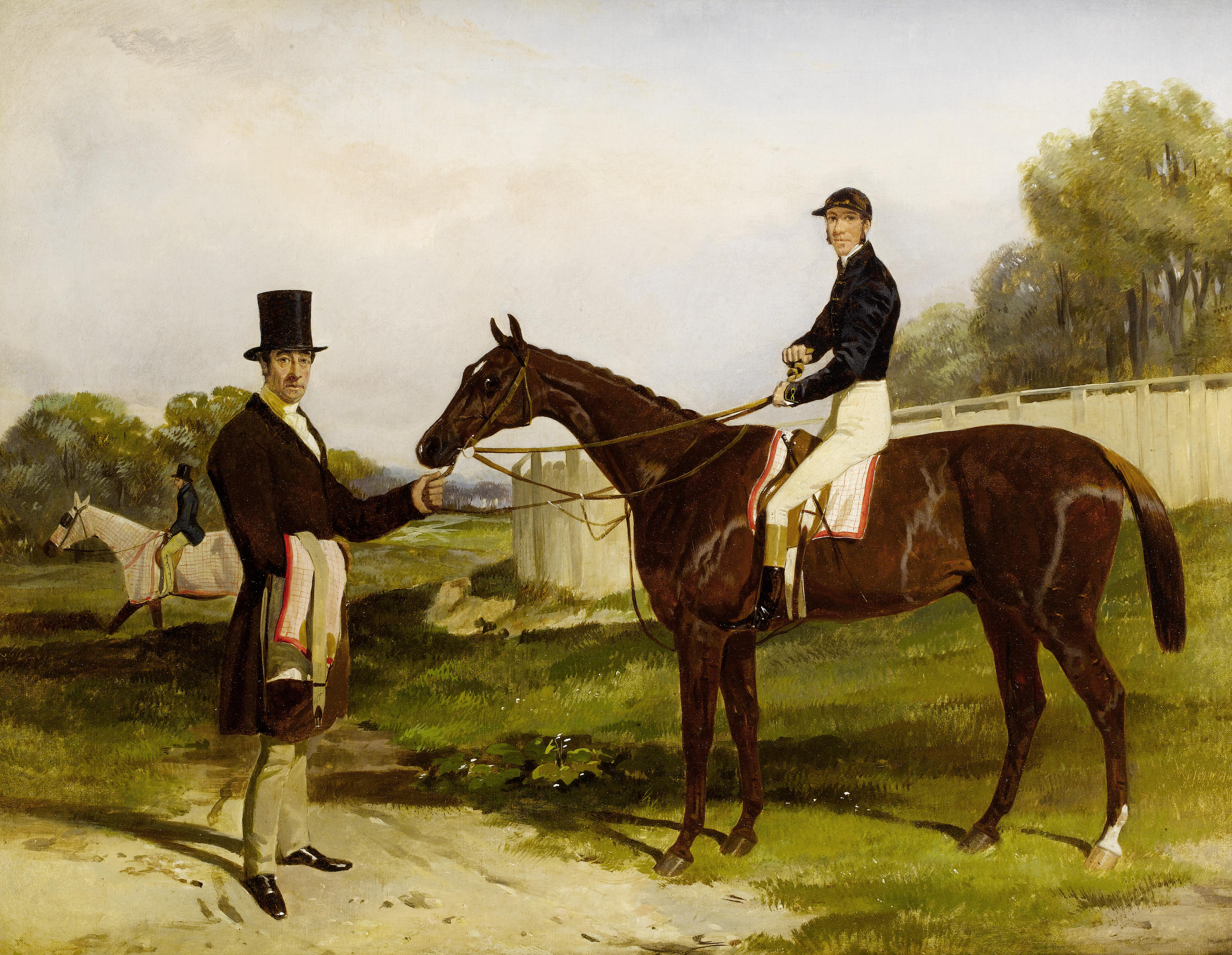
Frank Butler on the 1852 Derby winner Daniel O'Rourke

Frank Butler (c. 1817–1856) was an English jockey who became one of the country's top riders. In a period of about 11 years he won The Derby twice, The Oaks on six occasions, the Two Thousand Guineas twice, the One Thousand Guineas twice, the St Leger, the Goodwood Cup on three occasions and the Triple Crown on West Australian. In his final years of racing he won 143 races from 384 starts. Illness forced him to stop riding in 1854 and he died two years later at the age of 39.

== Early years ==
Butler, whose first name was actually Francis, was born into a horse racing family; his mother, Sarah, was the daughter of jockey Samuel Chifney Sr. and his father, William, was a Newmarket based training-groom who served the Duke of Richmond, Lord Lonsdale and Frederick the Duke of York. Butler was educated in Norfolk and Ealing, but after the death of his father in 1827 his uncles - jockey Sam Chifney Jr. and his brother, trainer William Chifney - took an interest in his future. They passed on knowledge of the racetrack and Butler gained experience in the Chifney stables and riding the gallops. In 1834 at the age of 17 he had his first winner with a horse called Moorhen in a handicap plate at Newmarket. At this age he could scale 7st 2lb (he was five feet six and a half inches tall) but in later years he struggled to make the racing weights.

For several years he showed little of the promise that would eventually make him such a success, but he continued to gain experience riding trials and platers, then in the 1842 season his fortunes started to improve with 23 winners. In this year he had rides in the Derby, Oaks and St Ledger, coming second in the Oaks. In addition he had some good results in other races on a horse called Bob Peel. He was also offered a training and riding job in Russia, which he turned down out of concern for the cold climate.

== Years of success ==
The Chifney brothers struggled with their financial affairs and towards the end of the 1830s they were both declared bankrupt. Butler began to work with others in the sport including owner, Lord Orford and trainers Will Beresford and John Scott. His first big win came in the 1843 Epsom Oaks on an outsider called Poison owned by solicitor and money lender, George Samuel Ford, know to the racing fraternity as “Lawyer Ford”. Sam Chifney Jr. also rode in this race coming second, and this was his last outing as a jockey. Butler went on to win five more Oaks Stakes: 1844 The Princess, 1849 Lady Evelyn, 1850 Rhedycina, 1851 Iris and 1852 Songstress.

His next big win was the Goodwood Cup in 1843 on Hyllus in a thrilling finish. He won the race twice again in 1849 and 1850 on Canezou. Butler also took the Doncaster Cup on Canezou in 1849. In 1844, on the strength of his improved form, he became the stable jockey for trainer John Scott, who had lost the services of his brother, jockey Bill Scott, following a disagreement. In 1845 Butler won the St Leger on The Baron and again in 1853 on Western Australia. 1849 and 1853 saw him win the 2000 Guineas on respectively Nunnykirk and Western Australia and the 1000 Guineas in 1848 on Canezou and Lady Orford in 1850. In 1852 Butler won the Derby on Daniel O'Rourke and again in 1853 on Western Australia.

In his later years he struggled with his weight and often rode at 8st 7lb, being at a disadvantage to some other riders such as Nat Flatman who could make almost a stone lighter in his best years.

== Family ==
Butler married 18 year old Frances Bayly (spellings vary) on 18 December 1846 in Boxgrove, Sussex. She was the daughter of Charles Bayly, the farm bailiff for the Duke of Richmond's Goodwood Estate. Less than a year later, Butler's older brother, William, married Frances Bayly's sister Anne in the same church in Boxgrove. William Butler (1814–1874), was a Newmarket-based trainer who worked for the Duke of Bedford; he later became interested in greyhound breeding and racing.

Butler's wife died in December 1854 at the age of 26 and Frank Butler died just over 13 months later on 1 February 1856 in his mother's house called the Nunnery in Newmarket; the couple were childless. His mother Sarah (Chifney) Butler died the same year.
