= Meteora (horse) =

British-bred Thoroughbred racehorse

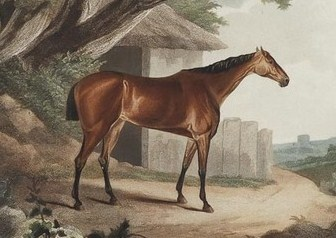
- Sire: Meteor
- Grandsire: Eclipse
- Dam: Maid of All Work
- Damsire: Highflyer
- Sex: Mare
- Foaled: 1802
- Country: United Kingdom of Great Britain and Ireland
- Colour: Bay
- Breeder: 2nd Earl Grosvenor
- Owner: Lord Grosvenor
- Trainer: Robert Robson
- Record: 36: 24-5-3

Major wins
- Oaks Stakes (1805); Match against Lyncaeus (1805); Chelmsford Gold Cup (1805); Match against Merryman (1805); Match against Staveley (1806); Oatlands Stakes (1807, 1809); Match against Cardinal Beaufort (1807); Stamford Gold Cup (1807, 1808, 1810); Match against Pipylina (1807); Audley End Stakes (1807); Somerset Stakes (1808); Brighton Gold Cup (1808); Jockey Club Plate (1810)

Meteora (1802–1821) was a British Thoroughbred racehorse and broodmare who won the classic Oaks Stakes at Epsom Downs Racecourse in 1805. In a racing career which began with her win in the Oaks on 31 May 1805 and lasted until July 1810 she ran thirty-six timeas and won twenty-four races. She defeated the Derby winner Cardinal Beaufort and the St Leger winner Staveley in match races and won many other important races of the era including the Stamford Gold Cup (three times), the Oatlands Stakes (twice), the Audley End Stakes, the Somerset Stakes and the Brighton Gold Cup. Many of her defeats occurred when she was carrying large weights in handicap races.

== Background ==
Meteora was a bay mare bred by her owner Robert Grosvenor, 2nd Earl Grosvenor, later 1st Marquess of Westminster. Her sire Meteor, a son of Eclipse, was also bred by Grosvenor's father and finished second in the 1786 Epsom Derby before winning his next 21 races. He dam, Maid of All Work was an influential broodmare, being the Foundation mare of Thoroughbred family 17-a and the direct female ancestor of many successful modern racehorses including Lyphard, Decidedly and Danzig Connection.

== Racing career ==
=== 1805: three-year-old season ===
Meteora's racing career was scheduled to begin with a 200 guinea match race against a filly owned by Mr Sitwell at Newmarket on 13 May. She won the prize money without having to compete when her opponent failed to appear for the race. On 31 May Meteora made her competitive debut in the Oaks Stakes at Epsom. In a field of eight she was the third choice in the betting at odds of 7/2 behind the Duke of Grafton's filly Dodona. Ridden by Francis Buckle, she won the classic from Dodona and Sir Frank Standish's unnamed sister to Duxbury.

Meteora won her remaining five race in 1805. At Ascot in June she won a Sweepstakes over the New Mile course despite carrying a seven pound weight penalty for her win in the Oaks. At the Newmarket July meeting she won a match race against the four-year-old colt Lyncaeus and in August she appeared at Chelmsford in Essex where she walked over for the Gold Cup. At Newmarket in October she won a subscription race over the two mile "Ditch-In" course and a 100 guinea match over the Rowley Mile against Merryman.

=== 1806: four-year-old season ===
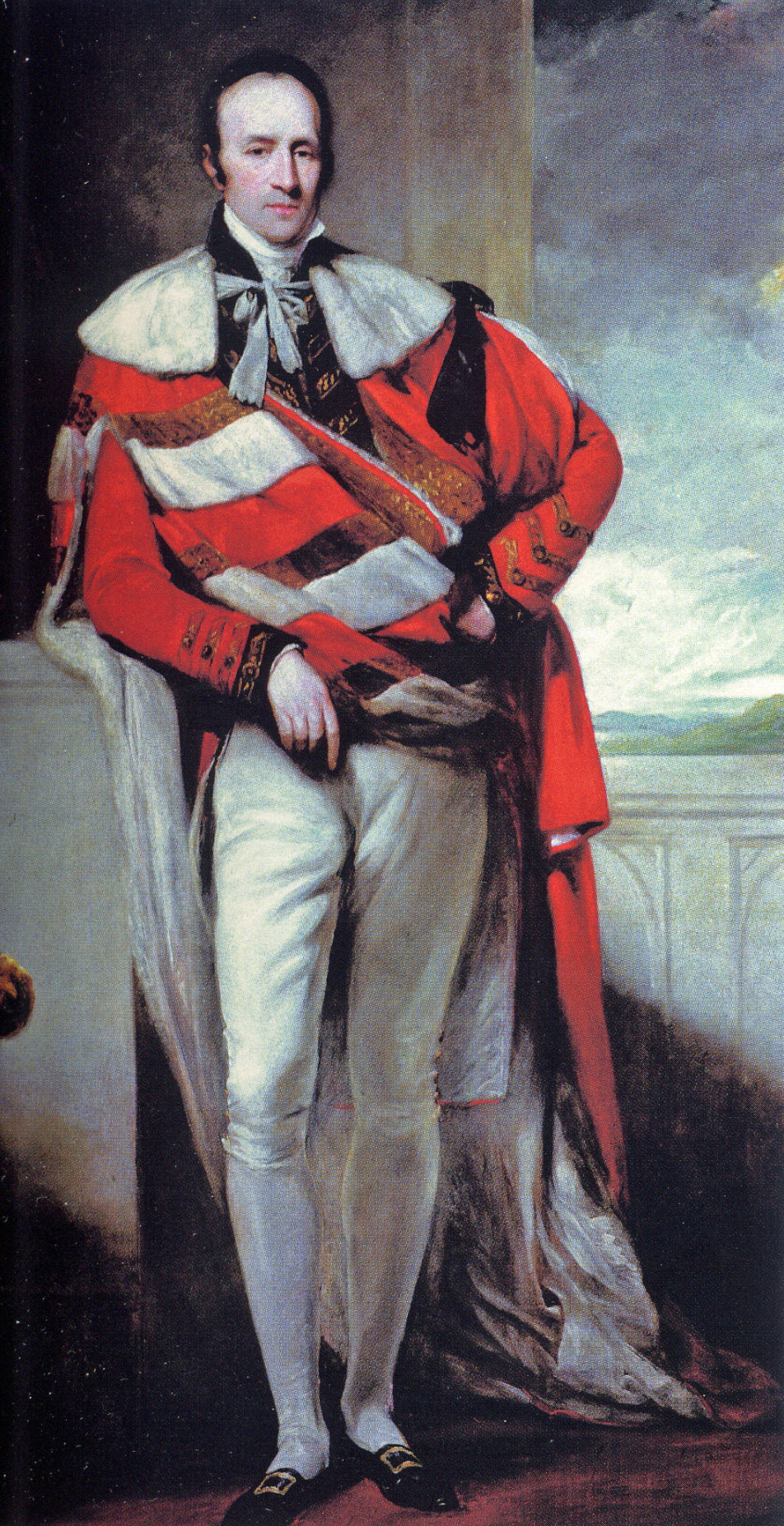
Robert Grosvenor, who bred and owned Meteora

At the Newmarket Craven meeting in April 1806 Meteora's owner received 200 guineas without having to race his filly when Lord Barrymore withdrew his four-year-old Gratitude from a match over the Abington Mile. Three days later Meteora ran a match against the St Leger winner Staveley over ten furlongs and defeated the colt to win a prize of 200 guineas. In May Meteora again "received forfeit" when Lord Osborne withdrew his horse Superstition from a match against the Oaks winner over the four mile Beacon Course. Meteora's unbeaten run came to an end on 15 July at Preston. She started favourite for the four mile Union Cup, but finished fifth of the eight runners behind Mr Clifton's colt Warrior. Two weeks later at Knutsford in Cheshire she finished third in a Sweepstakes over three miles.

=== 1807: five-year-old season ===
Meteora won six times from ten starts in 1807. At the Craven meeting she won a division of the Oatlands Stakes, a two-mile handicap race in which she conceded weight to all but one of her rivals. Two weeks later at Newmarket's First Spring meeting she finished last of the three runners behind her stable companion Violante and Staveley in the Free Handicap Sweepstakes. At the Second Spring she was matched against the Derby winner Cardinal Beaufort over the two mile Ditch-In course. Meteora defeated the colt to win a prize of 200 guineas. Three days later she was beaten when attempting to concede 11 pounds to Lord Sackville's horse Witchcraft over the same course and distance. In the summer Meteora was sent to compete at Stamford where she won the four mile Gold Cup on 1 July and a Sweepstakes on the following afternoon. At the Newmarket July meeting two weeks later Meteora returned to a sprint distance and successfully conceded ten pounds to Pipylina in a match over five furlongs. Meteora returned to Newmarket in autumn for three races. On 1 October she was beaten in a five furlong match by Mr Shakspear's horse Wormwood and two weeks later she finished third to L'Huile de Venus and Mouse in the October Oatlands Stakes. On 30 September started at odds of 5/1 in the Audley End Stakes over ten furlongs and won from the 1806 Oaks winner Bronze to whom she was conceding eighteen pounds.

=== 1808: six-year-old season ===
In 1808, Meteora won six of her eight races. She began her season by finishing second under top weight of 121 pounds in the Oatlands Stakes at the Craven meeting and then ran second again when attempting to concede nine pounds to Cardinal Beaufort in a four-mile Sweepstakes two weeks later. At the same meeting she ran a dead heat when conceding sixteen pounds to Brighton, a horse who went on to win the Ascot Gold Cup in June. Meteora won her remaining five races of 1808 outright. On 29 June she won a second Stamford Gold Cup, beating Lydia and Clinker. At Brighton in August she won the Somerset Stakes over four miles and the Brighton Gold Cup over the same distance two days later. At Newmarket she defeated the Duke of Grafton's horse Musician in a subscription race over the Beacon Course on 3 October and Lord Lowther's Brainworm in a similar event two weeks later.

=== 1809: seven-year-old season ===
Meteora began her fifth season by carrying a weight of 133 pounds in the Oatlands Stakes on 4 April at the Craven meeting. She started 6/4 favourite and won from Lord Foley's colt Weaver and four others. On 1 May at the Second Spring meeting she finished last of the four runners when favourite for a Sweepstakes and did not appear again on the racecourse until the autumn meetings at Newmarket. On 16 October she started 10/11 favourite and won a Sweepstakes over the Beacon Course from Nymphina and L'Huile de Venus. Two weeks later she was beaten when attempting to concede five pounds to Musician in a 400 guinea match. Meteora ended her season by finishing unplaced behind Nymphina when carrying a weight of 136 pounds in a two-mile handicap.

=== 1810: eight-year-old season ===
Meteora began her last season of competition by finishing unplaced under a weight of 130 pounds in the Oatlands Stakes on 25 April. At the next Newmarket meeting she "received forfeit" when Lord Lowther's Hylas, her only rival, was withdrawn from a Free Handicap Sweepstakes. Two days later the mare defeated six opponents to win the four mile Jockey Club Plate, a race restricted to horses owned by members of the Jockey Club. Meteora ended her racing career at Stamford on 4 July. She defeated three opponents to win the Stamford Gold Cup for the third time and reappeared later the same afternoon to carry top weight to victory in a Sweepstakes.

== Stud record ==
Meteora was retired from racing to become a broodmare at Lord Grosvenor's Eaton stud. She produced four foals who lived to maturity: Larissa (1813, by Trafalagar), Tybalt (1817 by Thunderbolt), Capulet (1818 by Thunderbolt) and Juliet (1819 by Thunderbolt). She died in 1821.

== Pedigree ==
Pedigree of Meteora (GB), bay mare, 1802
Sire Meteor (GB) 1783	Eclipse; 1764	Marske	Squirt
Sire Meteor (GB) 1783	Eclipse; 1764	Marske	Ruby Mare
Sire Meteor (GB) 1783	Eclipse; 1764	Spilletta	Regulus
Sire Meteor (GB) 1783	Eclipse; 1764	Spilletta	Mother Western
Sire Meteor (GB) 1783	Merlin Mare; 1765	Merlin	Second
Sire Meteor (GB) 1783	Merlin Mare; 1765	Merlin	Sister to Blank
Sire Meteor (GB) 1783	Merlin Mare; 1765	Mother Pratt	Marksman
Sire Meteor (GB) 1783	Merlin Mare; 1765	Mother Pratt	Mixbury Mare
Dam Maid of All Work 1786	Highflyer; 1774	Herod	Tartar
Dam Maid of All Work 1786	Highflyer; 1774	Herod	Cypron
Dam Maid of All Work 1786	Highflyer; 1774	Rachel	Blank
Dam Maid of All Work 1786	Highflyer; 1774	Rachel	Regulus mare
Dam Maid of All Work 1786	sister to Tandem; 1771	Syphon	Squirt
Dam Maid of All Work 1786	sister to Tandem; 1771	Syphon	Patriot mare
Dam Maid of All Work 1786	sister to Tandem; 1771	Regulus mare	Regulus
Dam Maid of All Work 1786	sister to Tandem; 1771	Regulus mare	Snip mare (Family 17-a)
