= Sharp practice =

Legal term

Sharp practice or sharp dealing is a pejorative phrase to describe sneaky or cunning behavior that is technically within the rules of the law but borders on being unethical.

The term has been used by judges in Canada; in one case, a Canadian Construction Board gave an example of "sharp practice" for one party to "take advantage of a clear oversight by the opposite party in a proceeding." According to another source, a Canadian court of appeal judgement, judges should not accuse counsel of sharp practice lightly and should generally not make such an accusation based solely on written submissions. Likewise in R v Badger the Supreme Court of Canada forbade the government from engaging in "sharp dealing" with First Nations in implementing treaties.

== See also ==
- Gaming the system
