= Tag (horse) =

British racehorse

- Sire: Trentham
- Grandsire: Sweepstakes
- Dam: Venus
- Damsire: Eclipse
- Sex: Mare
- Foaled: 1786
- Country: Kingdom of Great Britain
- Colour: Bay
- Breeder: 3rd Earl of Egremont
- Owner: 3rd Earl of Egremont
- Trainer: Frank Neale
- Record: 3: 1-1-1
- Earnings: 575 gs

Major wins
- Oaks Stakes (1789)

Tag (foaled 1786) was a British Thoroughbred racehorse. She started only three races, and won once, the Oaks Stakes at Epsom Downs. She was owned by George Wyndham, 3rd Earl of Egremont, and trained by Frank Neale. As a broodmare for the Earl she produced eleven foals.

== Background ==
Tag was a bay filly bred by George Wyndham, 3rd Earl of Egremont, and foaled in 1786. She was sired by Trentham, a successful racehorse who ran for eight years, winning many races, including two Jockey Club Plates. Her dam was Venus, a daughter of Eclipse and full-sister to Jupiter, Mercury and Volunteer.

== Racing career ==
On 29 May 1789 at Epsom Downs, Tag competed in her first race, the Oaks Stakes. Along with the filly Hope, she started as the 5/2 joint-favourite. Eighteen fillies had initially been entered for the race, but only seven started. Tag won the race from Earl Grosvenor's sister to Trifle, with Hope finishing in third place, the filly by Magnet in fourth and Restless in fifth. The other two runners could not be placed by the judge. The following day she was withdrawn from a match race against the Duke of Bedford's Skyscraper. In June at Ascot Heath, she lost a mile and a quarter match race against the colt Magpie. Her final race came in July 1789 at Brighthelmstone in a £50 race consisting of four, one mile and three quarter heats. Tag started as the favourite of the four runners, priced at about evens. She won the first heat, Skyrocket won the second heat, but Mentor won the last two heats to win the race.

== Stud career ==
As a broodmare for the Earl of Egremont she produced eleven foals, including Tag, Gulliver, Lazy, Baby and Old Maid. Lazy was the dam of Ascot Gold Cup winner Anderida. She has descendants today through the grandson of her 1796 daughter by Precipitate, St John, who was sent to Australia in 1836.

== Pedigree ==
Pedigree of Tag, bay mare, 1786
Sire Trentham (GB) b. 1766	Sweepstakes (GB) b. 1749	Gower Stallion b. 1740	Godolphin Arabian
Sire Trentham (GB) b. 1766	Sweepstakes (GB) b. 1749	Gower Stallion b. 1740	Whitefoot mare
Sire Trentham (GB) b. 1766	Sweepstakes (GB) b. 1749	Partner mare	Partner*
Sire Trentham (GB) b. 1766	Sweepstakes (GB) b. 1749	Partner mare	Brown Farewell
Sire Trentham (GB) b. 1766	Miss South (GB) b. 1758	South b. 1750	Regulus*
Sire Trentham (GB) b. 1766	Miss South (GB) b. 1758	South b. 1750	Soreheels mare
Sire Trentham (GB) b. 1766	Miss South (GB) b. 1758	Cartouch mare	Cartouch
Sire Trentham (GB) b. 1766	Miss South (GB) b. 1758	Cartouch mare	Ebony
Dam Venus (GB) ch. 1773	Eclipse (GB) ch. 1764	Marske br. 1750	Squirt
Dam Venus (GB) ch. 1773	Eclipse (GB) ch. 1764	Marske br. 1750	Blacklegs mare
Dam Venus (GB) ch. 1773	Eclipse (GB) ch. 1764	Spilletta b. 1749	Regulus*
Dam Venus (GB) ch. 1773	Eclipse (GB) ch. 1764	Spilletta b. 1749	Mother Western
Dam Venus (GB) ch. 1773	Tartar mare (GB)	Tartar; 1743	Partner*
Dam Venus (GB) ch. 1773	Tartar mare (GB)	Tartar; 1743	Melinora
Dam Venus (GB) ch. 1773	Tartar mare (GB)	Mogul mare	Mogul
Dam Venus (GB) ch. 1773	Tartar mare (GB)	Mogul mare	Sweepstakes mare

Note: b. = Bay, br. = Brown, ch. = Chestnut

* Tag was inbred 4x4 to Partner and Regulus. This means that both stallions appear twice in the fourth generation of her pedigree.
