= Bridget (horse) =

British Thoroughbred racehorse

- Sire: Herod
- Grandsire: Tartar
- Dam: Jemima
- Damsire: Snap
- Sex: Mare
- Foaled: 1776
- Country: Kingdom of Great Britain
- Colour: Bay
- Breeder: 12th Earl of Derby
- Owner: 12th Earl of Derby

Major wins
- Oaks Stakes (1779); Sweepstakes of 50gs at Newmarket (1779); Sweepstakes of 100gs at Newmarket (1779); Post Stakes (1780); Grosvenor's Stakes (1780); Match against Postboy (1780); Match against Girandola (1781)

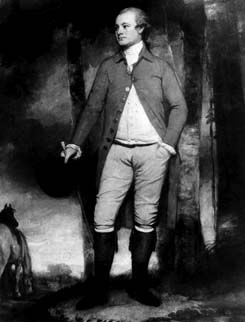
Bridget's owner the 12th Earl of Derby

Bridget (1776–1798) was a British Thoroughbred racehorse who won the inaugural running of the Oaks Stakes in 1779. She was bred and owned by Edward Smith-Stanley, 12th Earl of Derby, for whom she produced five foals as a broodmare.

== Background ==
Bridget was a bay filly bred by Edward Smith-Stanley, 12th Earl of Derby, and foaled in 1776. She was sired by Herod, who was a successful racehorse and important sire. He was champion sire eight times and his progeny included the undefeated Highflyer, Oaks winners Faith and Maid of the Oaks, St. Leger winner Phoenomenon and the triple Craven Stakes winner Woodpecker. Bridget was the first foal of Jemima, a daughter of Snap.

== Racing career ==
Bridget made her first racecourse appearance on 14 May 1779 in the first running of the Oaks Stakes at Epsom Downs. After starting as the 5/2 favourite, she won the race, beating Fame, Lavinia and nine others. At Newmarket in July she won a Sweepstakes of 50 guineas each over the Rowley Mile, beating Fame, Torrent and one other. At Newmarket's First October meeting she started as the 1/2 favourite for a Sweepstakes of 100 guineas each over the two-mile Ditch In course. She won the race, beating four rivals, including Torrent and Transfer. At the Newmarket Craven meeting in 1780 Bridget beat Thunder to win the Post Stakes. In July she beat Whipcord to win half of the Grosvenor's Stakes, after the other half had been given to Imperator to withdraw from the race. Her only other race of 1780 was in October, when she beat Postboy in a match over the two middle miles of the Beacon Course at Newmarket. Bridget started once in 1781, winning a match against General Smith's Girandola.

== Stud career ==
Bridget became a broodmare at the Earl of Derby's stud and produced five foals. They were:

- Guilford colt – a chestnut colt foaled in 1787.
- Hotspur – a chestnut colt sired by Volunteer and foaled in 1789. In 1792 he finished third in the Great Produce Stakes at Newmarket.
- Fair Helen – a bay filly sired by Sir Peter Teazle and foaled in 1792. She ran unplaced in the Oaks as a three-year-old. In March 1796 she won a three-mile Annual Plate at Farndon, before walking over for another the following day.
- Millamant – a chestnut filly sired by Volunteer and foaled in 1793.
- Sir Thomas – a bay colt sired by Sir Peter Teazle and foaled in 1795.

Bridget died in 1798.

== Pedigree ==
Pedigree of Bridget, bay mare, 1776
Sire Herod (GB) b. 1758	Tartar (GB); 1743	Partner; 1718	Jigg
Sire Herod (GB) b. 1758	Tartar (GB); 1743	Partner; 1718	Sister to Mixbury
Sire Herod (GB) b. 1758	Tartar (GB); 1743	Melinora; 1729	Fox*
Sire Herod (GB) b. 1758	Tartar (GB); 1743	Melinora; 1729	Milkmaid
Sire Herod (GB) b. 1758	Cypron (GB) b. 1750	Blaze b. 1733	Flying Childers*
Sire Herod (GB) b. 1758	Cypron (GB) b. 1750	Blaze b. 1733	Confederate Filly
Sire Herod (GB) b. 1758	Cypron (GB) b. 1750	Selima; 1733	Bethell's Arabian
Sire Herod (GB) b. 1758	Cypron (GB) b. 1750	Selima; 1733	Graham's Champion mare
Dam Jemima (GB) b. 1769	Snap (GB) br. 1750	Snip br. 1736	Flying Childers*
Dam Jemima (GB) b. 1769	Snap (GB) br. 1750	Snip br. 1736	Basto mare
Dam Jemima (GB) b. 1769	Snap (GB) br. 1750	Fox mare	Fox*
Dam Jemima (GB) b. 1769	Snap (GB) br. 1750	Fox mare	Gipsey
Dam Jemima (GB) b. 1769	Matchem Middleton (GB)	Matchem b. 1748	Cade
Dam Jemima (GB) b. 1769	Matchem Middleton (GB)	Matchem b. 1748	Partner mare
Dam Jemima (GB) b. 1769	Matchem Middleton (GB)	Miss Middleton	Regulus
Dam Jemima (GB) b. 1769	Matchem Middleton (GB)	Miss Middleton	Camilla

Note: b. = Bay, br. = Brown

* Bridget was inbred 4x4 to both Fox and Flying Childers. This means that the stallions appear twice in the fourth generation of her pedigree.
