= Henry Bernard Chalon =

English painter and lithographer (1770–1849)

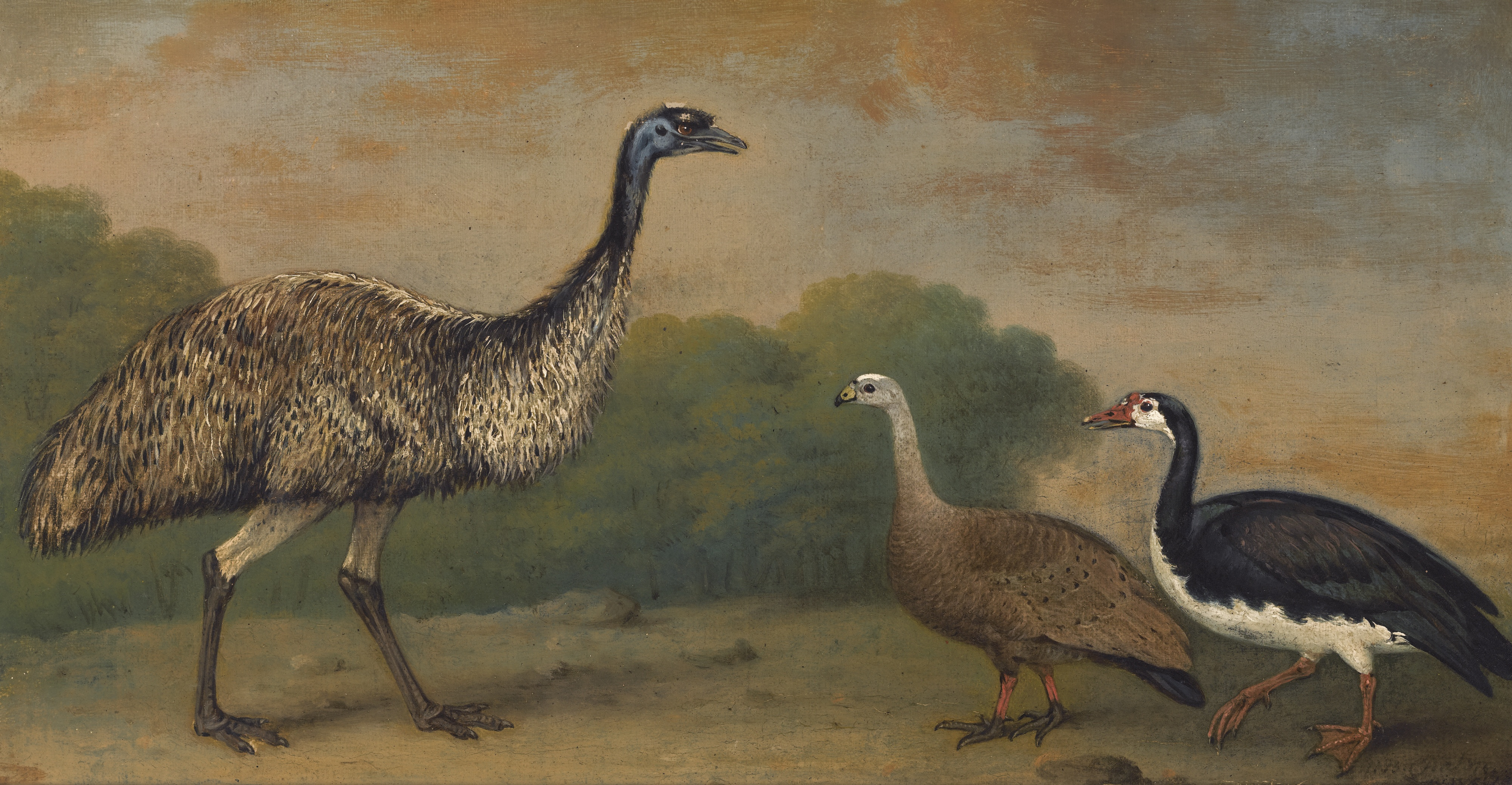
An Emu, a Cape Barren Goose and a Magpie Goose, in a Landscape, Painting by Henry Bernard Chalon, 1813

Henry Bernard Chalon (1770–1849) was an English painter and lithographer.

== Life ==
Son of the Dutch émigré and engraver Jan Chalon (1749–1795), Henry studied at the Royal Academy Schools and then started specializing in sporting and animal painting. He was appointed Animal Painter to Frederica, Duchess of York, in 1795, and later to both the Prince Regent and King William IV. Royal patronage also led to work for many other social prominent sporting enthusiasts but, despite exhibiting frequently at the Royal Academy, he never became a member of it. This may be because of a conservative trend in painting at this time, which favoured George Stubbs's measured style, which Chalon forever tried to imitate. He also drew lithographs for Philipp Andre's "Specimens of Polyautography" in 1804.

His one child, a daughter, was the miniaturist Maria A Chalon (Mrs Henry Moseley, c. 1800–1867).
