= Epsom Oaks =

British Group 1 horse race tor 3-year-old filles

Oaks Stakes
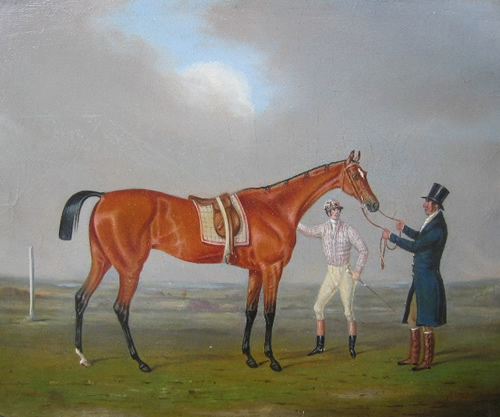
- 1801 Oaks winner Eleanor
- Class: Group 1
- Location: Epsom Downs; Epsom, England
- Inaugurated: 1779
- Race type: Flat / Thoroughbred
- Sponsor: Betfred
- Website: Epsom Downs

Race information
- Distance: 1m 4f 6y (2,420 m), or about 1½ miles
- Surface: Turf
- Track: Left-handed
- Qualification: Three-year-old fillies
- Weight: 9 st 2 lb
- Purse: £625,000 (2026); 1st: £354,437.50

Epsom Oaks
2026
Thundering On	Legacy Link	Sugar Island

Previous years
2025
Minnie Hauk	Whirl	Desert Flower
2024
Ezeliya	Dance Sequence	War Chimes
2023
Soul Sister	Savethelastdance	Caernarfon
2022
Tuesday	Emily Upjohn	Nashwa
2021
Snowfall	Mystery Angel	Divinely

2020-2011
2020
Love	Ennistymon	Frankly Darling
2019
Anapurna	Pink Dogwood	Fleeting
2018
Forever Together	Wild Illusion	Bye Bye Baby
2017
Enable	Rhododendron	Alluringly
2016
Minding	Architecture	Harlequeen
2015
Qualify	Legatissimo	Lady of Dubai
2014
Taghrooda	Tarfasha	Volume
2013
Talent	Secret Gesture	The Lark
2012
Was	Shirocco Star	The Fugue
2011
Dancing Rain	Wonder of Wonders	Izzi Top

2010–2001
2010
Snow Fairy	Remember When	Rumoush
2009
Sariska	Midday	High Heeled
2008
Look Here	Moonstone	Katiyra
2007
Light Shift	Peeping Fawn	All My Loving
2006
Alexandrova	Rising Cross	Short Skirt
2005
Eswarah	Something Exciting	Pictavia
2004
Ouija Board	All Too Beautiful	Punctilious
2003
Casual Look	Yesterday	Summitville
2002
Kazzia	Quarter Moon	Shadow Dancing
2001
Imagine	Flight of Fancy	Relish The Thought

2000–1991
2000
Love Divine	Kalypso Katie	Melikah
1999
Ramruma	Noushkey	Zahrat Dubai
1998
Shahtoush	Bahr	Midnight Line
1997
Reams of Verse	Gazelle Royale	Crown of Light
1996
Lady Carla	Pricket	Mezzogiorno
1995
Moonshell	Dance A Dream	Pure Grain
1994
Balanchine	Wind in Her Hair	Hawajiss
1993
Intrepidity	Royal Ballerina	Oakmead
1992
User Friendly	All at Sea	Pearl Angel
1991
Jet Ski Lady	Shamshir	Shadayid

1990–1981
1990
Salsabil	Game Plan	Knight's Baroness
1989
Snow Bride	Roseate Tern	Mamaluna
1988
Diminuendo	Sudden Love	Animatrice
1987
Unite	Bourbon Girl	Three Tails
1986
Midway Lady	Untold	Maysoon
1985
Oh So Sharp	Triptych	Dubian
1984
Circus Plume	Media Luna	Poquito Queen
1983
Sun Princess	Acclimatise	New Coins
1982
Time Charter	Slightly Dangerous	Last Feather
1981
Blue Wind	Madam Gay	Leap Lively

1980–1971
1980
Bireme	Vielle	The Dancer
1979
Scintillate	Bonnie Isle	Britannia's Rule
1978
Fair Salinia	Dancing Maid	Suni
1977
Dunfermline	Freeze the Secret	Vaguely Deb
1976
Pawneese	Roses For the Star	African Dancer
1975
Juliette Marny	Val's Girl	Moonlight Night
1974
Polygamy	Furioso	Matuta
1973
Mysterious	Where You Lead	Aureoletta
1972
Ginevra	Regal Exception	Arkadina
1971
Altesse Royale	Maina	La Manille

1970–1966
1970
Lupe	State Pension	Arctic Wave
1969
Sleeping Partner	Frontier Goddess	Myastrid
1968
La Lagune	Glad One	Pandora Bay
1967
Pia	St. Pauli Girl	Ludham
1966
Valoris	Berkeley Springs	Varinia

The Oaks Stakes is a Group 1 flat horse race in Great Britain open to three-year-old fillies. It is run at Epsom Downs over a distance of 1 mile, 4 furlongs and 6 yards (2,420 metres), about 1½ miles, and it is scheduled to take place each year in late May or early June. It is the second-oldest of the five Classic races, after the St Leger. Officially the Betfred Oaks, it is also popularly known as simply The Oaks. Though it is occasionally referred to as the Epsom Oaks, at least outside the UK, 'Epsom' is not part of the official title of the race.

It is the third of Britain's five Classic races to be held during the season, and the second of two restricted to fillies. It can also serve as the middle leg of the Fillies Triple Crown, preceded by the 1000 Guineas and followed by the St Leger, although the feat of winning all three is rarely attempted.

== History ==
The event is named after The Oaks, an estate located to the east of Epsom which was leased to the 12th Earl of Derby in the 18th century. He and his guests devised the race during a party at the estate in 1778. It was first run (as the Oakes Stakes) in 1779, one year before the introduction of the Derby Stakes. The inaugural winner, Bridget, was owned by Lord Derby himself.

The Oaks subsequently became one of Britain's leading events for three-year-olds. By the mid-1860s, the five leading events for this age group were referred to as "Classics". The concept was later adopted in many other countries.

European variations of the Oaks include the Irish Oaks, the Preis der Diana, the Prix de Diane and the Oaks d'Italia. Other national equivalents include the AJC Oaks, the New Zealand Oaks and the Yushun Himba.

Since 1892, horses have each carried 9 stone in the race. Prior to this, there were several fluctuations, from an original 8 stone 4 pounds, down to 8 stone, then progressively upwards.

During both World Wars the race was run at Newmarket under the title the New Oaks Stakes. The 2014 running incorporated the name of Sir Henry Cecil in its title. Cecil, who died in June 2013, trained eight Oaks winners between 1985 and 2007.

== Records ==
Leading jockey (9 wins):

- Frank Buckle – Nike (1797), Bellissima (1798), Bellina (1799), Scotia (1802), Theophania (1803), Meteora (1805), Neva (1817), Corinne (1818), Zinc (1823)

Leading trainer (13 wins):

- Robert Robson – Scotia (1802), Pelisse (1804), Meteora (1805), Briseis (1807), Morel (1808), Maid of Orleans (1809), Music (1813), Minuet (1815), Landscape (1816), Corinne (1818), Pastille (1822), Zinc (1823), Wings (1825)

Leading owner (10 wins): (includes part ownership)

- Susan Magnier – Shahtoush (1998), Imagine (2001), Alexandrova (2006), Was (2012), Minding (2016), Forever Together (2018), Love (2020), Snowfall (2021), Tuesday (2022), Minnie Hauk (2025)

Fastest winning time (at Epsom)

- Love (2020), 2m 34.06s

Widest winning margin

- Snowfall (2021), 16 lengths

Longest odds winners

- Vespa (1833), Jet Ski Lady (1991) and Qualify (2015)

Shortest odds winner – 8/100

- Pretty Polly (1904)

Most runners

- 26, in 1848

Fewest runners

- 4, in 1799 and 1904

== Winners ==
Year	Winner	Jockey	Trainer	Owner	Time
1779	Bridget	Dick Goodisson	Saunders	12th Earl of Derby
1780	Tetotum	Dick Goodisson		Thomas Douglas
1781	Faith	Dick Goodisson	John Pratt	1st Earl Grosvenor
1782	Ceres	Sam Chifney	John Pratt	1st Earl Grosvenor
1783	Maid of the Oaks	Sam Chifney	John Pratt	1st Earl Grosvenor
1784	Stella	Charles Hindley		Philip Burlton
1785	Trifle	J. Bird	John Pratt	1st Earl of Clermont
1786	Yellow Filly	James Edwards	Richard Prince	Sir Frank Standish
1787	Annette	Dennis Fitzpatrick	J. Watson	Richard Vernon
1788	Nightshade	Dennis Fitzpatrick	Frank Neale	3rd Earl of Egremont
1789	Tag	Sam Chifney	Frank Neale	3rd Earl of Egremont
1790	Hippolyta	Sam Chifney	Matt Stephenson	5th Duke of Bedford
1791	Portia	John Singleton Jr.	Matt Stephenson	5th Duke of Bedford
1792	Volante	Charles Hindley	John Pratt	1st Earl of Clermont
1793	Caelia	John Singleton Jr.	Matt Stephenson	5th Duke of Bedford
1794	Hermione	Sam Arnull	Saunders	12th Earl of Derby
1795	Platina	Dennis Fitzpatrick	Frank Neale	3rd Earl of Egremont
1796	Parisot	John Arnull	Richard Prince	Sir Frank Standish
1797	Nike	Frank Buckle	John Pratt	1st Earl Grosvenor
1798	Bellissima	Frank Buckle	Richard Prince	John Durand
1799	Bellina	Frank Buckle	John Pratt	1st Earl Grosvenor
1800	Ephemera	Dennis Fitzpatrick	Frank Neale	3rd Earl of Egremont
1801	Eleanor	John Saunders	J. Frost	Sir Charles Bunbury
1802	Scotia	Frank Buckle	Robert Robson	John Wastell
1803	Theophania	Frank Buckle	Sam King	Sir Thomas Gascoigne
1804	Pelisse	Bill Clift	Robert Robson	3rd Duke of Grafton
1805	Meteora	Frank Buckle	Robert Robson	2nd Earl Grosvenor
1806	Bronze	William Edwards	Dixon Boyce	Berkeley Craven
1807	Briseis	Samuel Chifney Jr.	Robert Robson	Thomas Grosvenor
1808	Morel	Bill Clift	Robert Robson	3rd Duke of Grafton
1809	Maid of Orleans	Ben Moss	Robert Robson	John Leveson-Gower
1810	Oriana	Bill Peirse	Bill Peirse	Sir William Gerard
1811	Sorcery	Samuel Chifney Jr.	Dixon Boyce	5th Duke of Rutland
1812	Manuella	Bill Peirse	Bill Peirse	W. N. W. Hewett
1813	Music	Tom Goodisson	Robert Robson	4th Duke of Grafton
1814	Medora	Sam Barnard	Dixon Boyce	5th Duke of Rutland
1815	Minuet	Tom Goodisson	Robert Robson	4th Duke of Grafton
1816	Landscape	Samuel Chifney Jr.	Robert Robson	John Leveson-Gower
1817	Neva	Frank Buckle	Dixon Boyce	George Watson
1818	Corinne	Frank Buckle	Robert Robson	John Udney
1819	Shoveler	Samuel Chifney Jr.	William Chifney	Thomas Thornhill
1820	Caroline	Harry Edwards	Robert Stephenson	3rd Earl of Egremont
1821	Augusta	Jem Robinson	R. Prince Jr.	2nd Marquess of Exeter
1822	Pastille	Harry Edwards	Robert Robson	4th Duke of Grafton
1823	Zinc	Frank Buckle	Robert Robson	4th Duke of Grafton
1824	Cobweb	Jem Robinson	James Edwards	5th Earl of Jersey
1825	Wings	Samuel Chifney Jr.	Robert Robson	Thomas Grosvenor
1826	Lilias	Tommy Lye	John Forth	John Forth
1827	Gulnare	Frank Boyce	John Kent	5th Duke of Richmond
1828	Turquoise	John Barham Day	Robert Stephenson	4th Duke of Grafton
1829	Green Mantle	George Dockeray	Charles Marson	2nd Marquess of Exeter
1830	Variation	George Edwards	Bobby Pettit	William Scott Stonehewer
1831	Oxygen	John Barham Day	Robert Stephenson	4th Duke of Grafton
1832	Galata	Patrick Conolly	Charles Marson	2nd Marquess of Exeter
1833	Vespa	Jem Chapple	H. Scott	Sir Mark Wood
1834	Pussy	John Barham Day	W. Day	Thomas Cosby
1835	Queen of Trumps	Tommy Lye	John Blenkhorn	Edward Lloyd-Mostyn
1836	Cyprian	Bill Scott	John Scott	John Scott
1837	Miss Letty	John Holmes	Isaac Blades	Thomas Orde-Powlett
1838	Industry	Bill Scott	John Scott	6th Earl of Chesterfield
1839	Deception	John Barham Day	W. Treen	Fulwar Craven
1840	Crucifix	John Barham Day	John Barham Day	Lord George Bentinck
1841	Ghuznee	Bill Scott	John Scott	1st Marquess of Westminster
1842	Our Nell	Tommy Lye	Tom Dawson	George Dawson
1843	Poison	Frank Butler	R. Fisher	George Samuel Ford
1844	The Princess	Frank Butler	John Scott	George Anson
1845	Refraction	Henry Bell	John Kent Jr.	5th Duke of Richmond
1846	Mendicant	Sam Day	John Day	John Gully	2:53.00
1847	Miami	Sim Templeman	W. Beresford	Sir Joseph Hawley	2:54.00
1848	Cymba	Sim Templeman	John Day	Harry Hill	2:48.00
1849	Lady Evelyn	Frank Butler	Tom Taylor	6th Earl of Chesterfield	2:56.00
1850	Rhedycina	Frank Butler	William Goodwin	George Hobson	2:56.00
1851	Iris	Frank Butler	John Scott	Lord Stanley	2:52.00
1852	Songstress	Frank Butler	John Scott	John Scott	3:00.00
1853	Catherine Hayes	Charles Marlow	Mathew Dawson	John Don-Wauchope	2:52.00
1854	Mincemeat	Jack Charlton	William Goodwin	William Cookson	3:00.00
1855	Marchioness	Sim Templeman	John Scott	William Rudston-Read	2:58.00
1856	Mincepie	Alfred Day	John Day	Harry Hill	3:04.00
1857	Blink Bonny	Jack Charlton	William I'Anson	William I'Anson	2:50.00
1858	Governess (Note: The race finished as a dead-heat in 1858, but Governess defeated Gildermire in a run-off.)	Tom Ashmall	Tom Eskrett	William Gratwicke	2:53.50
1859	Summerside	George Fordham	Tom Taylor	1st Baron Londesborough	2:55.00
1860	Butterfly	Jim Snowden	G. Oates	Richard Eastwood	2:56.00
1861	Brown Duchess	Luke Snowden	Joseph Saxon	Joseph Saxon	2:44.00
1862	Feu de Joie	Tom Chaloner	James Godding	Richard Naylor	2:49.00
1863	Queen Bertha	Tom Aldcroft	John Scott	6th Viscount Falmouth	2:54.00
1864	Fille de l'Air	Arthur Edwards	Tom Jennings Sr.	Frédéric de Lagrange	2:47.00
1865	Regalia	John Norman	William Harlock	William Graham	2:51.00
1866	Tormentor	Jimmy Mann	C. Blanton	Benjamin Ellam	2:53.00
1867	Hippia	John Daley	Joseph Hayhoe	Mayer A. de Rothschild	2:54.00
1868	Formosa	George Fordham	Henry Woolcott	William Graham	2:47.50
1869	Brigantine	Tom Cannon Sr.	William Day	Sir Frederick Johnstone	2:59.00
1870	Gamos	George Fordham	Henry Woolcott	William Graham	2:52.00
1871	Hannah	Charlie Maidment	Joseph Hayhoe	Mayer A. de Rothschild	2:51.00
1872	Reine	George Fordham	Tom Jennings Sr.	Claude Joachim Lefèvre	2:52.00
1873	Marie Stuart	Tom Cannon Sr.	Robert Peck	James Merry	2:50.45
1874	Apology	John Osborne Jr.	William Osborne	John King	2:48.50
1875	Spinaway	Fred Archer	Mathew Dawson	6th Viscount Falmouth	2:49.50
1876 (dh)	Camelia; Enguerrande	Tom Glover; Hudson	T. Cunnington; C. Wetherall	Frédéric de Lagrange; Auguste Lupin	2:50.00
1877	Placida	Harry Jeffery	Joseph Marsh	John Fiennes	2:54.50
1878	Jannette	Fred Archer	Mathew Dawson	6th Viscount Falmouth	2:54.00
1879	Wheel of Fortune	Fred Archer	Mathew Dawson	6th Viscount Falmouth	3:02.00
1880	Jenny Howlet	Jim Snowden	William I'Anson Jr.	Charles Perkins	2:49.00
1881	Thebais	George Fordham	Alec Taylor Sr.	William Stirling Crawfurd	2:46.00
1882	Geheimniss	Tom Cannon Sr.	John Porter	7th Earl of Stamford	2:49.00
1883	Bonny Jean	John Watts	Joe Cannon	5th Earl of Rosebery	2:53.00
1884	Busybody	Tom Cannon Sr.	Tom Cannon Sr.	George Baird	2:49.00
1885	Lonely	Fred Archer	William Gilbert Jr.	5th Earl Cadogan	2:44.00
1886	Miss Jummy	John Watts	Richard Marsh	12th Duke of Hamilton	2:54.40
1887	Reve d'Or	Charles Wood	Alec Taylor Sr.	8th Duke of Beaufort	2:50.40
1888	Seabreeze	Jack Robinson	James Jewitt	5th Baron Calthorpe	2:42.80
1889	L'Abbesse de Jouarre	Jimmy Woodburn	Robert Sherwood	Lord Randolph Churchill	2:45.00
1890	Memoir	John Watts	George Dawson	6th Duke of Portland	2:40.80
1891	Mimi	Fred Rickaby	Mathew Dawson	Noel Fenwick	2:54.60
1892	La Fleche	George Barrett	John Porter	Baron Maurice de Hirsch	2:43.20
1893	Mrs Butterwick	John Watts	George Dawson	6th Duke of Portland	2:44.00
1894	Amiable	Walter Bradford	George Dawson	6th Duke of Portland	2:50.00
1895	La Sagesse	Sam Loates	Martin Gurry	Sir James Miller	2:48.80
1896	Canterbury Pilgrim	Fred Rickaby	George Lambton	16th Earl of Derby	2:45.60
1897	Limasol	Walter Bradford	Tom Jennings Jr.	2nd Baron Hindlip	2:45.00
1898	Airs and Graces	Walter Bradford	Fred Day	W. T. Jones	2:45.20
1899	Musa	Otto Madden	Harry Enoch	Douglas Baird	2:44.00
1900	La Roche	Morny Cannon	John Porter	6th Duke of Portland	2:48.20
1901	Cap and Bells	Milton Henry	Sam Darling	Foxhall Keene	2:44.40
1902	Sceptre	Herbert Randall	Bob Sievier	Bob Sievier	2:46.60
1903	Our Lassie	Morny Cannon	Charles Morton	Jack Barnato Joel	2:44.60
1904	Pretty Polly	Willie Lane	Peter Gilpin	Eustace Loder	2:46.20
1905	Cherry Lass	Herbert Jones	Jack Robinson	William Hall Walker	2:38.00
1906	Keystone	Danny Maher	George Lambton	16th Earl of Derby	2:38.60
1907	Glass Doll	Herbert Randall	Charles Morton	Jack Barnato Joel	2:42.00
1908	Signorinetta	Billy Bullock	Odoardo Ginistrelli	Odoardo Ginistrelli	2:42.40
1909	Perola	Frank Wootton	Saunders Davies	William Cooper	2:39.80
1910	Rosedrop	Charlie Trigg	Alec Taylor Jr.	Sir William Bass	2:38.20
1911	Cherimoya	Fred Winter Sr.	Charlie Marsh	William Broderick Cloete	2:41.60
1912	Mirska	Joe Childs	Tom Jennings Jr.	Jean Prat	2:43.00
1913	Jest	Fred Rickaby Jr.	Charles Morton	Jack Barnato Joel	2:37.60
1914	Princess Dorrie	Bill Huxley	Charles Morton	Jack Barnato Joel	2:38.20
1915	Snow Marten	Walter Griggs	Peter Gilpin	Ludwig Neumann	2:36.20
1916	Fifinella	Joe Childs	Dick Dawson	Sir Edward Hulton	2:35.00
1917	Sunny Jane	Otto Madden	Alec Taylor Jr.	Waldorf Astor	2:43.40
1918	My Dear (Note: Stony Ford finished first in 1918, but she was disqualified for causing interference to My Dear.)	Steve Donoghue	Alec Taylor Jr.	Alfred Cox	2:34.80
1919	Bayuda	Joe Childs	Alec Taylor Jr.	Lady James Douglas	2:37.20
1920	Charlebelle	Albert Whalley	Sandy Braime	Alan Cunliffe	2:38.20
1921	Love in Idleness	Joe Childs	Alec Taylor Jr.	Joseph Watson	2:38.40
1922	Pogrom	Ted Gardner	Alec Taylor Jr.	2nd Viscount Astor	2:36.20
1923	Brownhylda	Vic Smyth	Dick Dawson	Vicomte de Fontarce	2:37.00
1924	Straitlace	Frank O'Neill	Dawson Waugh	Sir Edward Hulton	2:47.00
1925	Saucy Sue	Frank Bullock	Alec Taylor Jr.	2nd Viscount Astor	2:43.60
1926	Short Story	Bobby Jones	Alec Taylor Jr.	2nd Viscount Astor	2:43.60
1927	Beam	Tommy Weston	Frank Butters	3rd Earl of Durham	2:34.60
1928	Toboggan	Tommy Weston	Frank Butters	17th Earl of Derby	2:37.40
1929	Pennycomequick	Henri Jelliss	Joseph Lawson	2nd Viscount Astor	2:35.80
1930	Rose of England	Gordon Richards	Thomas Hogg	Lord Glanely	2:39.00
1931	Brulette	Charlie Elliott	Frank Carter	Charles Birkin	2:39.20
1932	Udaipur	Michael Beary	Frank Butters	Aga Khan III	2:43.20
1933	Chatelaine	Sam Wragg	Fred Templeman	Ernest Thornton-Smith	2:36.80
1934	Light Brocade	Brownie Carslake	Frank Butters	5th Earl of Durham	2:35.20
1935	Quashed	Henri Jelliss	Colledge Leader	Lord Stanley	2:41.40
1936	Lovely Rosa	Tommy Weston	Harry Cottrill	Sir Abe Bailey	2:36.00
1937	Exhibitionnist	Steve Donoghue	Joseph Lawson	Sir Victor Sassoon	2:36.80
1938	Rockfel	Harry Wragg	Ossie Bell	Sir Hugo Cunliffe-Owen	2:37.00
1939	Galatea	Bobby Jones	Joseph Lawson	Robert Sterling Clark	2:40.60
1940	Godiva	Doug Marks	William Rose Jarvis	Esmond Harmsworth	2:29.40
1941	Commotion	Harry Wragg	Fred Darling	Arthur Dewar	2:35.60
1942	Sun Chariot	Gordon Richards	Fred Darling	King George VI	2:33.20
1943	Why Hurry	Charlie Elliott	Noel Cannon	Jimmy Rank	2:32.60
1944	Hycilla	Georges Bridgland	Cecil Boyd-Rochfort	William Woodward Sr.	2:30.40
1945	Sun Stream	Harry Wragg	Walter Earl	17th Earl of Derby	2:30.00
1946	Steady Aim	Harry Wragg	Frank Butters	Sir Alfred Butt	2:41.00
1947	Imprudence	Rae Johnstone	Joseph Lieux	Mrs Pierre Corbière	2:40.00
1948	Masaka	Billy Nevett	Frank Butters	Aga Khan III	2:40.60
1949	Musidora	Edgar Britt	Charles Elsey	Norman Donaldson	2:40.00
1950	Asmena	Rae Johnstone	Charles Semblat	Marcel Boussac	2:42.40
1951	Neasham Belle	Stan Clayton	Geoffrey Brooke	Lionel Holliday	2:41.20
1952	Frieze	Edgar Britt	Charles Elsey	Alexander Keith	2:35.36
1953	Ambiguity	Joe Mercer	Jack Colling	3rd Viscount Astor	2:36.48
1954	Sun Cap	Rae Johnstone	Richard Carver	Mrs Robert Forget	2:39.12
1955	Meld	Harry Carr	Cecil Boyd-Rochfort	Lady Zia Wernher	2:47.48
1956	Sicarelle	Freddie Palmer	François Mathet	Suzy Volterra	2:42.00
1957	Carrozza	Lester Piggott	Noel Murless	Queen Elizabeth II	2:37.24
1958	Bella Paola	Max Garcia	François Mathet	François Dupré	2:40.48
1959	Petite Etoile	Lester Piggott	Noel Murless	Prince Aly Khan	2:35.48
1960	Never Too Late	Roger Poincelet	Etienne Pollet	Mrs Howell Jackson	2:39.12
1961	Sweet Solera	Bill Rickaby	Reginald Day	Mrs Magnus Castello	2:39.24
1962	Monade	Yves Saint-Martin	Joseph Lieux	George Goulandris	2:38.12
1963	Noblesse	Garnie Bougoure	Paddy Prendergast	Evelyn Olin	2:39.36
1964	Homeward Bound	Greville Starkey	John Oxley	Foster Robinson	2:49.36
1965	Long Look	Jack Purtell	Vincent O'Brien	James Cox Brady Jr.	2:39.56
1966	Valoris	Lester Piggott	Vincent O'Brien	Charles Clore	2:39.35
1967	Pia	Edward Hide	Bill Elsey	Countess Batthyany	2:38.34
1968	La Lagune	Gérard Thiboeuf	François Boutin	Henry Berlin	2:41.66
1969	Sleeping Partner	John Gorton	Doug Smith	6th Earl of Rosebery	2:39.94
1970	Lupe	Sandy Barclay	Noel Murless	Gladys Joel	2:41.46
1971	Altesse Royale	Geoff Lewis	Noel Murless	Roger Hue-Williams	2:36.95
1972	Ginevra	Tony Murray	Ryan Price	Charles St George	2:39.35
1973	Mysterious	Geoff Lewis	Noel Murless	George Pope Jr.	2:36.31
1974	Polygamy	Pat Eddery	Peter Walwyn	Louis Freedman	2:39.39
1975	Juliette Marny	Lester Piggott	Jeremy Tree	James Morrison	2:39.10
1976	Pawneese	Yves Saint-Martin	Angel Penna Sr.	Daniel Wildenstein	2:35.25
1977	Dunfermline	Willie Carson	Dick Hern	Queen Elizabeth II	2:36.53
1978	Fair Salinia	Greville Starkey	Michael Stoute	Sven Hanson	2:36.82
1979	Scintillate	Pat Eddery	Jeremy Tree	James Morrison	2:43.74
1980	Bireme	Willie Carson	Dick Hern	Dick Hollingsworth	2:34.33
1981	Blue Wind	Lester Piggott	Dermot Weld	Diana Firestone	2:40.93
1982	Time Charter	Billy Newnes	Henry Candy	Robert Barnett	2:34.21
1983	Sun Princess	Willie Carson	Dick Hern	Sir Michael Sobell	2:40.98
1984	Circus Plume	Lester Piggott	John Dunlop	Sir Robin McAlpine	2:38.97
1985	Oh So Sharp	Steve Cauthen	Henry Cecil	Sheikh Mohammed	2:41.37
1986	Midway Lady	Ray Cochrane	Ben Hanbury	Harry Ranier	2:35.60
1987	Unite	Walter Swinburn	Michael Stoute	Sheikh Mohammed	2:38.17
1988	Diminuendo	Steve Cauthen	Henry Cecil	Sheikh Mohammed	2:35.02
1989	Snow Bride (Note: Aliysa was first in 1989, but she was later disqualified after testing positive for a banned substance.)	Steve Cauthen	Henry Cecil	Saeed bin M. Al Maktoum	2:34.22
1990	Salsabil	Willie Carson	John Dunlop	Hamdan Al Maktoum	2:38.70
1991	Jet Ski Lady	Christy Roche	Jim Bolger	Maktoum Al Maktoum	2:37.30
1992	User Friendly	George Duffield	Clive Brittain	Bill Gredley	2:39.77
1993	Intrepidity	Michael Roberts	André Fabre	Sheikh Mohammed	2:34.19
1994	Balanchine	Frankie Dettori	Hilal Ibrahim	Maktoum / Godolphin	2:40.37
1995	Moonshell	Frankie Dettori	Saeed bin Suroor	Maktoum / Godolphin	2:35.44
1996	Lady Carla	Pat Eddery	Henry Cecil	Wafic Saïd	2:35.55
1997	Reams of Verse	Kieren Fallon	Henry Cecil	Khalid Abdullah	2:35.59
1998	Shahtoush	Michael Kinane	Aidan O'Brien	Nagle / Magnier	2:38.23
1999	Ramruma	Kieren Fallon	Henry Cecil	Prince Fahd bin Salman	2:38.72
2000	Love Divine	Richard Quinn	Henry Cecil	Lordship Stud	2:43.11
2001	Imagine	Michael Kinane	Aidan O'Brien	Nagle / Magnier	2:36.70
2002	Kazzia	Frankie Dettori	Saeed bin Suroor	Godolphin	2:44.52
2003	Casual Look	Martin Dwyer	Andrew Balding	William S. Farish III	2:38.07
2004	Ouija Board	Kieren Fallon	Ed Dunlop	19th Earl of Derby	2:35.41
2005	Eswarah	Richard Hills	Michael Jarvis	Hamdan Al Maktoum	2:39.00
2006	Alexandrova	Kieren Fallon	Aidan O'Brien	Magnier / Tabor / Smith	2:37.71
2007	Light Shift	Ted Durcan	Henry Cecil	Niarchos Family	2:40.38
2008	Look Here	Seb Sanders	Ralph Beckett	Julian Richmond-Watson	2:36.89
2009	Sariska	Jamie Spencer	Michael Bell	Lady Bamford	2:35.28
2010	Snow Fairy	Ryan Moore	Ed Dunlop	Anamoine Ltd	2:35.77
2011	Dancing Rain	Johnny Murtagh	William Haggas	Martin and Lee Taylor	2:41.73
2012	Was	Seamie Heffernan	Aidan O'Brien	Smith / Magnier / Tabor	2:38.68
2013	Talent	Richard Hughes	Ralph Beckett	J Rowsell & M Dixon	2:42.00
2014	Taghrooda	Paul Hanagan	John Gosden	Hamdan Al Maktoum	2:34.89
2015	Qualify	Colm O'Donoghue	Aidan O'Brien	Chantal Regalado-Gonzalez	2:37.41
2016	Minding	Ryan Moore	Aidan O'Brien	Smith / Magnier / Tabor	2:42.66
2017	Enable	Frankie Dettori	John Gosden	Khalid Abdullah	2:34.13
2018	Forever Together	Donnacha O'Brien	Aidan O'Brien	Smith / Magnier / Tabor	2:40.39
2019	Anapurna	Frankie Dettori	John Gosden	Helena Springfield Ltd	2:36.09
2020	Love (Note: The 2020 race was run in July due to the COVID-19 pandemic.)	Ryan Moore	Aidan O'Brien	Tabor Smith / Magnier	2:34.06
2021	Snowfall	Frankie Dettori	Aidan O'Brien	Smith / Magnier / Tabor	2:42.67
2022	Tuesday	Ryan Moore	Aidan O'Brien	Magnier / Tabor / Smith / Westerberg	2:37.83
2023	Soul Sister	Frankie Dettori	John & Thady Gosden	Lady Bamford	2:36.41
2024	Ezeliya	Chris Hayes	Dermot Weld	Aga Khan IV	2:42.06
2025	Minnie Hauk	Ryan Moore	Aidan O'Brien	Smith /Magnier / Tabor	2:38.91
2026	Thundering On	Dylan Browne McMonagle	Joseph O'Brien	Shapoor Mistry	2:39.64

Wartime substitute race at Newmarket.

== See also ==
- Horse racing in Great Britain
- List of British flat horse races
- Trial races for the Epsom Oaks
