= Horse racing in India =

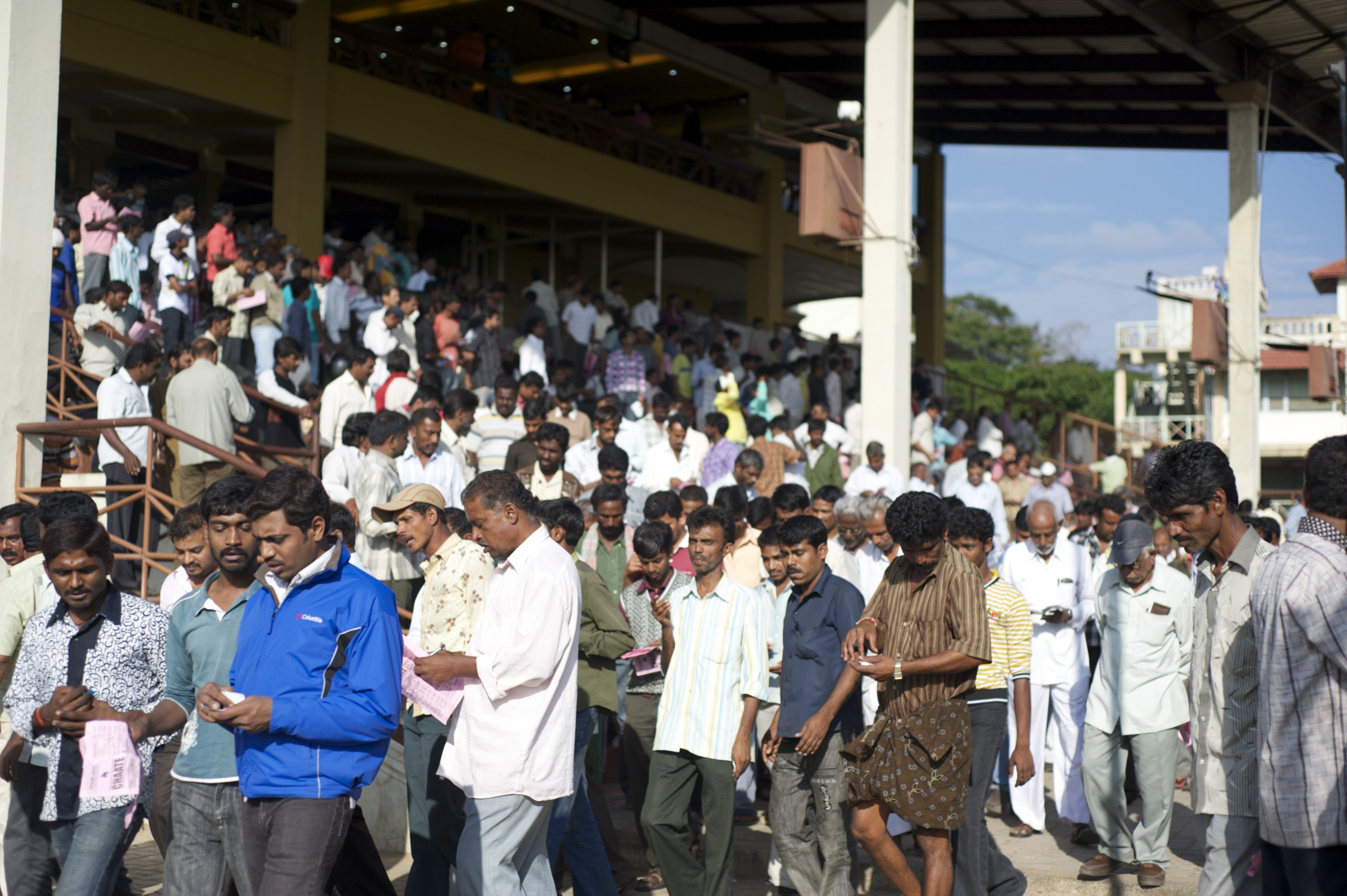
Stands at Mysore Turf Club

Horse racing in India is over 200 years old. The first racecourse in the country was set up in Madras in 1777. Today, India has a very well-established horse racing and breeding industry, the sport is conducted on nine racetracks by six racing authorities.

Racing is restricted to Indian-bred racehorses, India has a well-established breeding industry with stallions imported from around the world. The Indian Stud Book maintains records of all thoroughbred breeding activity in India.

India has a mixture of both pool betting and traditional bookmakers.

== Turf clubs ==
- Madras Race Club conducts racing in Chennai at Guindy Race Course from October to March and morning races at the picturesque Udhagamandalam Ooty Race Course from April to June. The race course was established in 1777 and the club was formed in 1837, making it is the oldest horse racing Club in South Asia.
- Delhi Race Club, established in 1940, conducts racing at India's capital Delhi usually once a week from August until May, where racing is run under the aegis of RWITC.
- Royal Calcutta Turf Club, conducts racing in Kolkata, with a main winter season from November to April and a monsoon season which runs from July until mid-October.
- Royal Western India Turf Club (RWITC), conducts racing in Mumbai from November to May and Pune from July to November.
- The Mysore Race Club conducts racing in Mysuru, which is the most picturesque in the country. Set up in the foothills of the imposing Chamundi Hills, the Mysore Race Club has a distinct identity of its own. Mysore, which is an independent Turf Authority conducts regular season between mid-August and the end of October, as well as smaller summer and winter seasons.
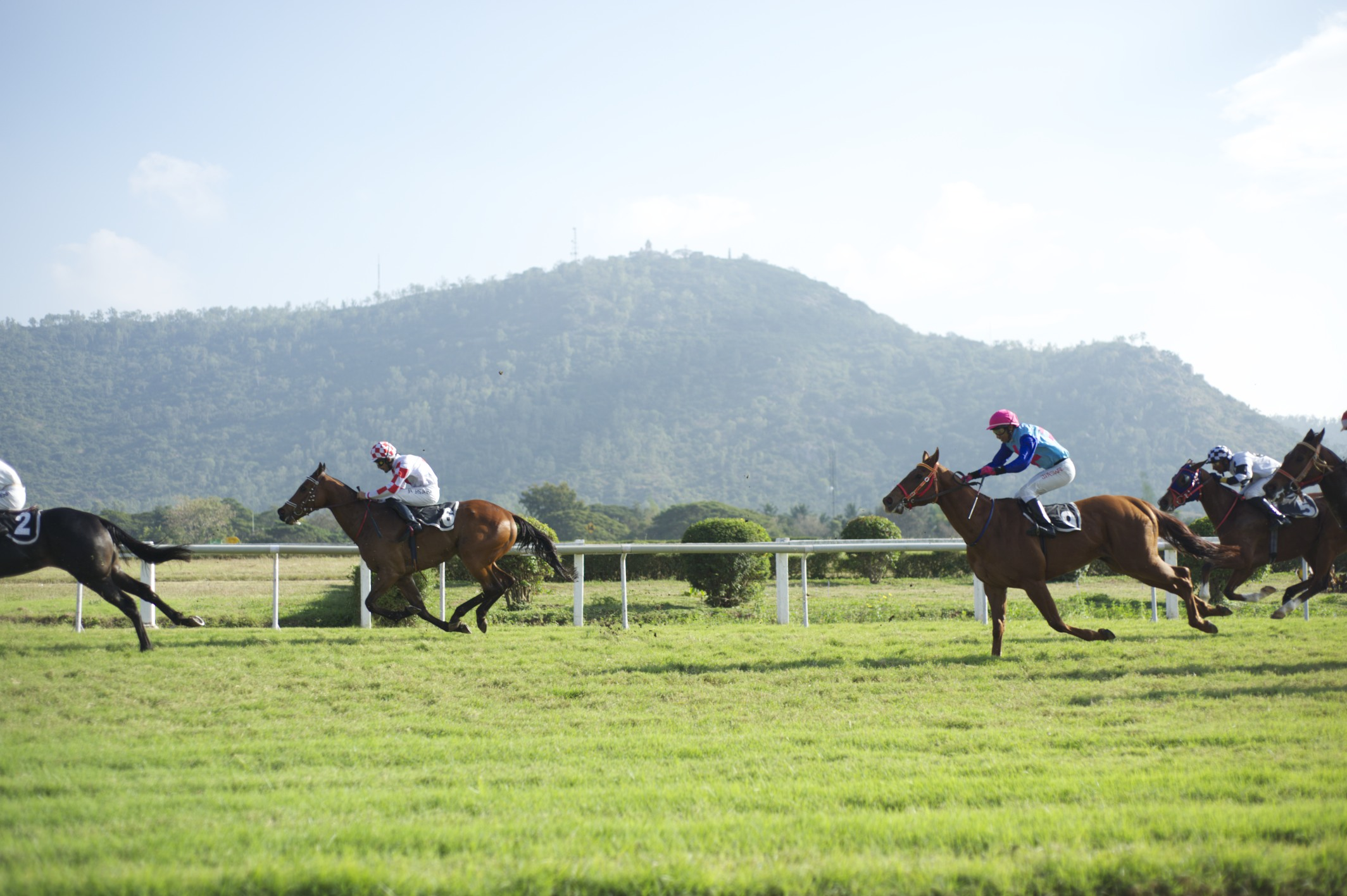
  Mysore Turf Club
- Bangalore Turf Club, conducts racing at Bangalore in two distinct seasons - in summer from May to August, and in winter from November to April.
- Hyderabad Race Club conducts racing in Hyderabad where racing is held on the Monsoon Track from July until the end of October and on the Winter Track from November until February. Hyderabad usually races on Sundays and Mondays.

All Race Clubs mentioned above conduct their set of Classic races. Classic races include The Derby, The Oaks, The St Leger, The 1000 & 2000 Guineas and more.

== Major races ==
India has five 'Classic' races which parallel the original British classic races. The Indian 1,000 Guineas and the Indian 2,000 Guineas are run in December. The Indian Oaks is run at the end of January. The Indian Derby is run on the first Sunday of February and carries a purse of over ₹ 30,000,000. Lastly, the Indian St. Leger is run in September. They are all run in the Mahalaxmi Racecourse, Mumbai, apart from the St. Leger which is run at Pune.

The Invitation Weekend which rotates between the various turf authorities is held on the first weekend of March. This features a Group 1 race each for sprinters over 1200 meters, a race over a mile, and a 3000-meter race for stayers. The best horses are invited from all over the country for these races. The showpiece event is open to Indian horses who are 4 years old and over, invited from all the turf authorities, and carries a winner's prize of ₹ 10,000,000. The Bangalore Derby is held on the second Sunday of July at the Bangalore Turf Club, Bangalore every year. It was sponsored by Kingfisher until the 2020 season. The Invitation Cup and associated races (i.e. The Sprinters'Cup, The Stayers' Cup, The Super Mile Cup) are rotational between the various race courses spread across the country, are run over 2400 meters, only the 4 years horses were eligible but from 2014 onwards it has been changed to elder horses also.

== Famous horses ==
Elusive Pimpernel (22 of 23 starts) and Squanderer (18 of 19 starts) are considered the greatest horses to have raced on Indian Turf. Both horses were trained by Rashid Byramji.

Indian Racing has witnessed champion horses in recent history in the name of Desert God, Quasar, Alaindair, Be Safe, In the Spotlight, etc...While Desert God(Burden Of Proof - Running Flame By Steinbeck) is the highest stakes earner of Indian Racing till date, In the Spotlight(Alnasr Alwasheek - Radiate) is the highest stakes earning filly in Indian Racing till date. Both were trained by multiple Classic-winning trainers Mr. S Padmanabhan. Desert God is also the highest Black type winner in India. Desert God was owned & bred by Mr. S Padmanabhan.

Indian horses have made their mark on the international scene. Mystical(Alnasr Alwasheek - Mystic Memory) won two races at the Dubai Racing Carnival. Saddle Up was the best horse in training on the Malaysia/Singapore circuit and won the Tunku Gold Cup as well as running second in the Singapore International Cup. Others to perform well have been Southern Regent, who won twice in England when way past his prime at the age of 9. Beat It Dude was one of the highest-rated horses in South Korea in 2008. Astonish was a Class 1 winner in Hong Kong. Quarantine restrictions and apathy on the part of the Indian Government have kept these opportunities to race abroad very minimal. Own Opinion represented India in the Japan Cup in 1981 at 6 years old, and is the only Indian horse to have taken part in all of the event's races. Although he finished 13th, he beat his record for 1.5 miles despite the race track being anti-clockwise.

== Famous trainers ==
Famous trainers over the years have been: Rashid Byramji, S.S.Attaollahi, J S Dhariwal, Pesi Shroff, S.M. Shah, S Padmanabhan, Imtiaz Sait, Dallas Todywalla, S Ganapathy, Madhav Mangalorkar, Arjun Mangalorkar, Vijay Singh, LVR Deshmukh, James Mckeown, Darius Byramji, S.S. Shah, Vinayak, D. Adenwala, ALJ Talib, A.B. David, Haskell David, Lawrence Fownes, Prasanna Kumar, Bezan Chenoy

== Famous jockeys ==
Famous Indian jockeys include Pesi Shroff, Vasant Shinde, Pandu Khade, Shamu Chavan, Kheem Singh, Aslam Kader, B Prakash, Sinclair Marshall, Robin Corner, Warren Singh, C Rajendra, Lloyd Marshall, Mohammed Dastagir(chinna), M Narredu, Richard Alford, E Alford, C Alford, C Ruzaan, B Sreekanth, K P G Appu, Suraj Narredu, P S Chouhan, A Sandesh, Trevor Patel, Akshay Kumar, S.John, C.S.Jodha Y S Srinath, Karl Umrigar During the winter season, many foreign jockeys also come to India. In recent years this has included the likes of David Allan, Sandy Barclay, Christophe Lemaire, Johnny Murtagh, Seamus Heffernan, Jim Crowley, Frankie Dettori, Pat Eddery, Richard Hughes, Stéphane Pasquier, Martin Dwyer, Colm O'Donoghue, Joseph O'Brien, Chris Hayes, Lester Piggott, Johnny Murtagh, Joe Mercer, Mick Kinane, Walter Swinburn, David Egan, Leigh Roche, Nicky Mackay and numerous others have ridden in India.

== Famous owners ==
Prominent owners over the years include; HH Maharaja Sir Harisinghji of Kashmir, HH Maharaja Jiwajirao Scindia, Vijayasinhji Chhatrasinhji, M. A. M. Ramaswamy, Vijay Mallya, Suresh Mahindra, Major PK Mehra, Marthand Mahindra, The Thomas Family (AV Thomas Group), The Brar family of Muktsar, The Goculdas Family, Ranjit V. Bhat, The Khaitan Family (McNeil & Magor Group), The Poonawalla Family, KN Dhunjibhoy, Shapoor Mistry, Vijay Shirke, Ameeta Mehra, S Rangarajan, Sunit Khatau of the Khatau family.

== Horse racing gambling in India ==
The process of betting is heavily prohibited in India - excluding horse racing and lotteries. The Supreme Court in the case of Dr. KR Lakshmanan v. State of Tamil Nadu (AIR 1996 SC 1153), stated that horse racing is not based on luck alone but is also based on skills. Several states have enacted statutes that specifically allow licensed bookmakers. Currently, betting is low-key after the GST regime came into being as it is heavily taxed by the Indian Govt. This has led to the sport suffering heavy loss of revenue.
