= List of jockeys =

This is a list of notable jockeys, both male and female, covering jockeys who have competed worldwide in all forms of horse racing.

== A ==
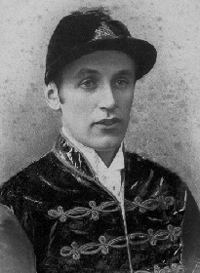
Fred Archer

- Eddie Ahern
- Robby Albarado
- Anna Lee Aldred
- Tony Allan
- Lisa Allpress
- Goncalino Almeida
- Junior Alvarado
- Kim Andersen
- Jack Anthony
- Chris Antley
- Eddie Arcaro
- Fred Archer
- John Arnull
- Sam Arnull
- Cash Asmussen
- Andrea Atzeni

== B ==
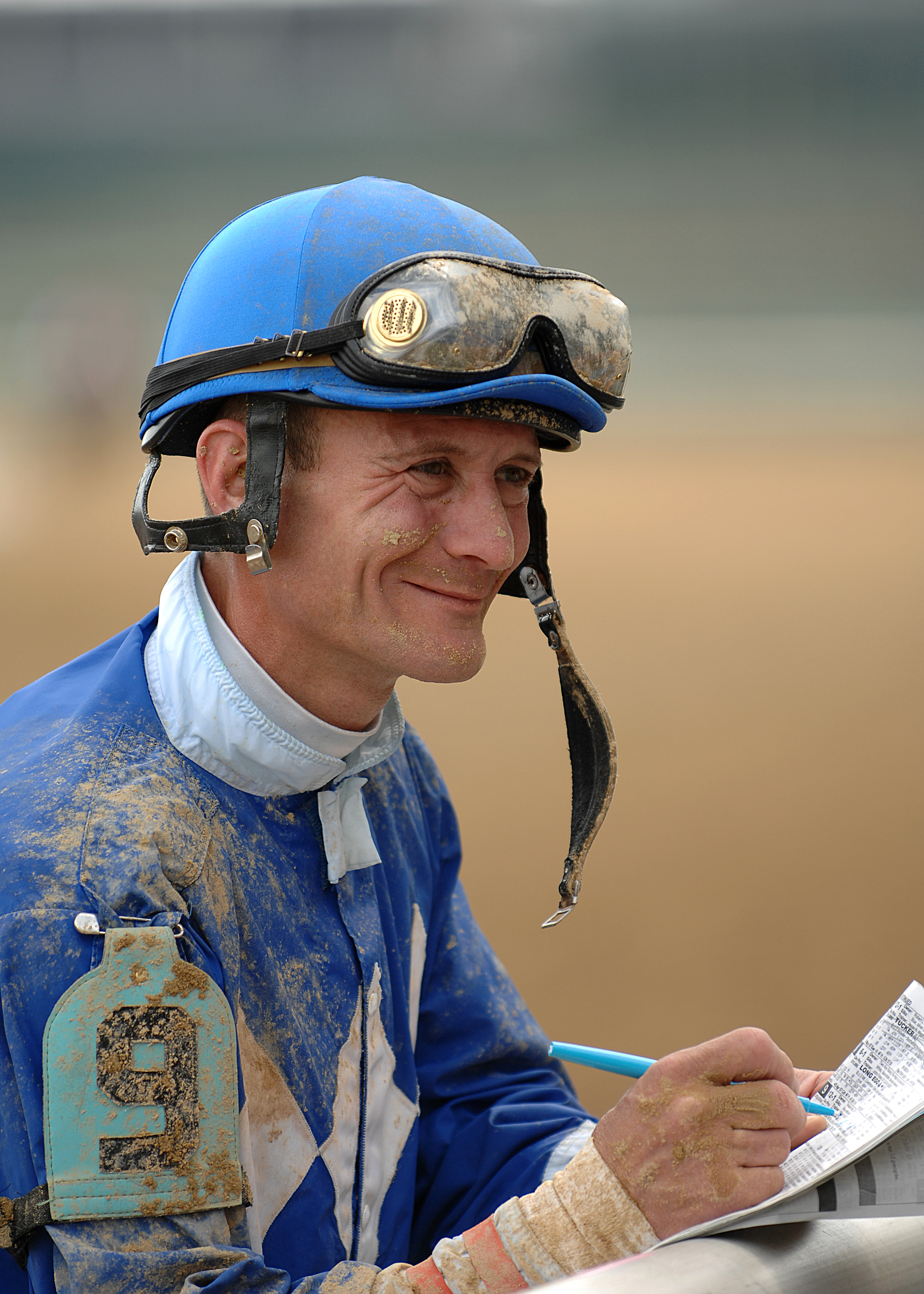
Calvin Borel

- Mary Bacon
- Jerry Bailey
- Lester Balaski
- Ron Barry
- Donna Barton Brothers
- Michael Baze
- Russell Baze
- Tyler Baze
- Bobby Beasley
- William Beasley
- Martin Becher
- Kaye Bell
- Terry Biddlecombe
- Dominique Boeuf
- Calvin Borel
- Glen Boss
- Opie Bosson
- Joe Bravo
- Scobie Breasley
- Paddy Brennan
- Charlotte Brew
- Shaun Bridgmohan
- Bill Broughton
- Corey Brown
- Edward D. Brown
- William Buick

== C ==
- David Campbell
- Nina Carberry
- Paul Carberry
- Tommy Carberry
- Eliza Carpenter
- Willie Carson
- G. R. Carter
- Jim Cassidy
- Larry Cassidy
- Jesús Castañón
- Javier Castellano
- Eddie Castro
- Steve Cauthen
- Bob Champion
- Jorge Chavez
- Joe Childs
- Alonzo Clayton
- Eibar Coa
- Ray Cochrane
- Davy Condon
- Patricia Cooksey
- Bryan Cooper
- Ángel Cordero Jr.
- Jean Cruguet
- Diane Crump
- Anthony S. Cruz
- Jim Culloty
- Charlie Cunningham
- Luke Currie

== D ==
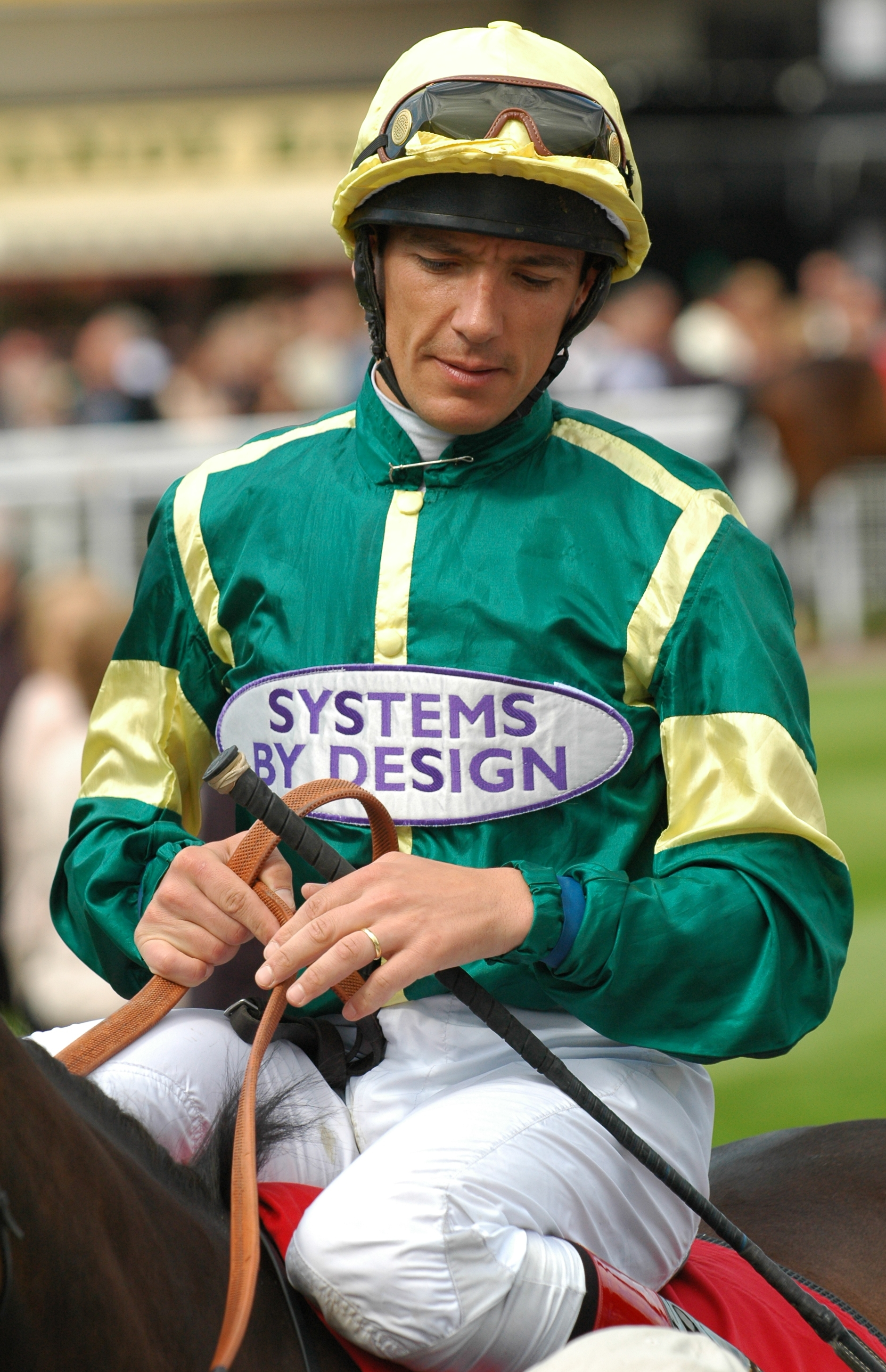
Frankie Dettori

- Henry Davies
- Robbie Davis
- Wantha Davis
- Pat Day
- Michael Dee
- Eddie Delahoussaye
- Cristian Demuro
- Mirco Demuro
- Kent Desormeaux
- Frankie Dettori
- Patricio Dilema
- Mick Dittman
- Guy Disney
- Ramon Domínguez
- Steve Donoghue
- Brett Doyle
- Hollie Doyle
- James Doyle
- Jimmy Duggan
- Richard Dunwoody
- Mark Du Plessis
- Martin Dwyer
- Shane Dye

== E ==
- Penny Ann Early
- Masayoshi Ebina
- Pat Eddery
- Stewart Elliott
- Victor Espinoza

== F ==
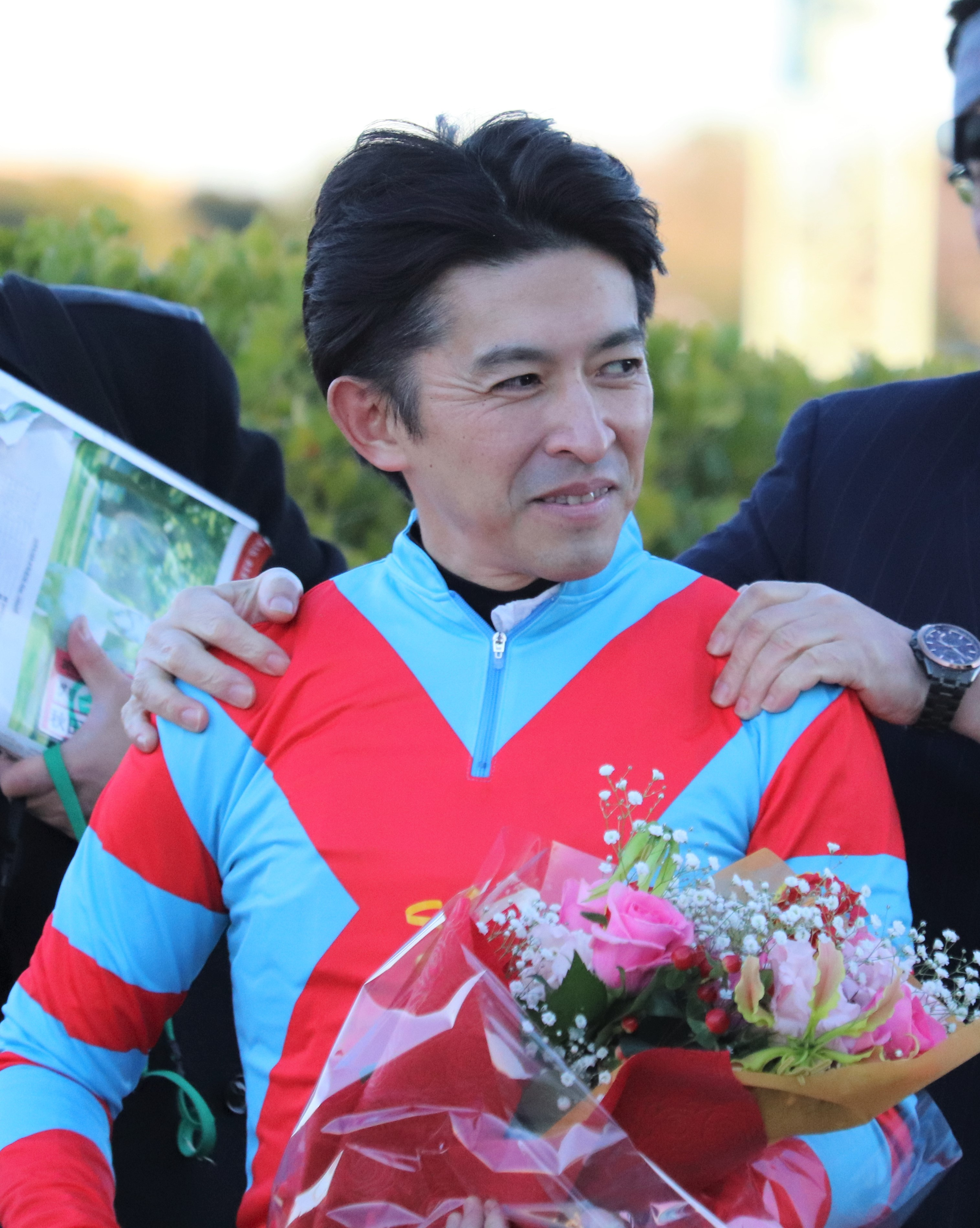
Yuichi Fukunaga

- Kieren Fallon
- Mick Fitzgerald
- Brian Fletcher
- David Romero Flores
- Jose Flores
- Jimmy Fortune
- Freddie Fox
- Richard Fox
- Dick Francis
- Manuel Franco
- John Francome
- Nanako Fujita
- Yuichi Fukunaga

== G ==
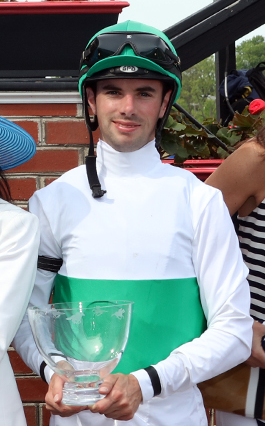
Florent Geroux

- Tyler Gaffalione
- Cathy Gannon
- Alan Garcia
- Martin Garcia
- Barry Geraghty
- Florent Geroux
- Josh Gifford
- Campbell Gillies
- Avelino Gomez
- Garrett K. Gomez
- Dick Goodisson
- Tom Goodisson
- Josephine Gordon
- Alex Greaves
- Jemmy Grimshaw
- Aaron Gryder
- Mario Gutierrez

== H ==
- Thore Hammer-Hansen
- Ira Hanford
- Noel Harris
- David Harrison
- Bill Hartack
- Abe Hawkins
- Sandy Hawley
- Chris Hayes
- Frank Hayes
- Seamie Heffernan
- JB Hernandez
- Brian Hernandez Jr.
- Roy Higgins
- Michael Hills
- Richard Hills
- Darryll Holland
- Norm Holland
- Rosemary Homeister Jr.
- Richard Hughes
- Patrick Husbands
- Simon Husbands
- Adam Hyeronimus

== I ==
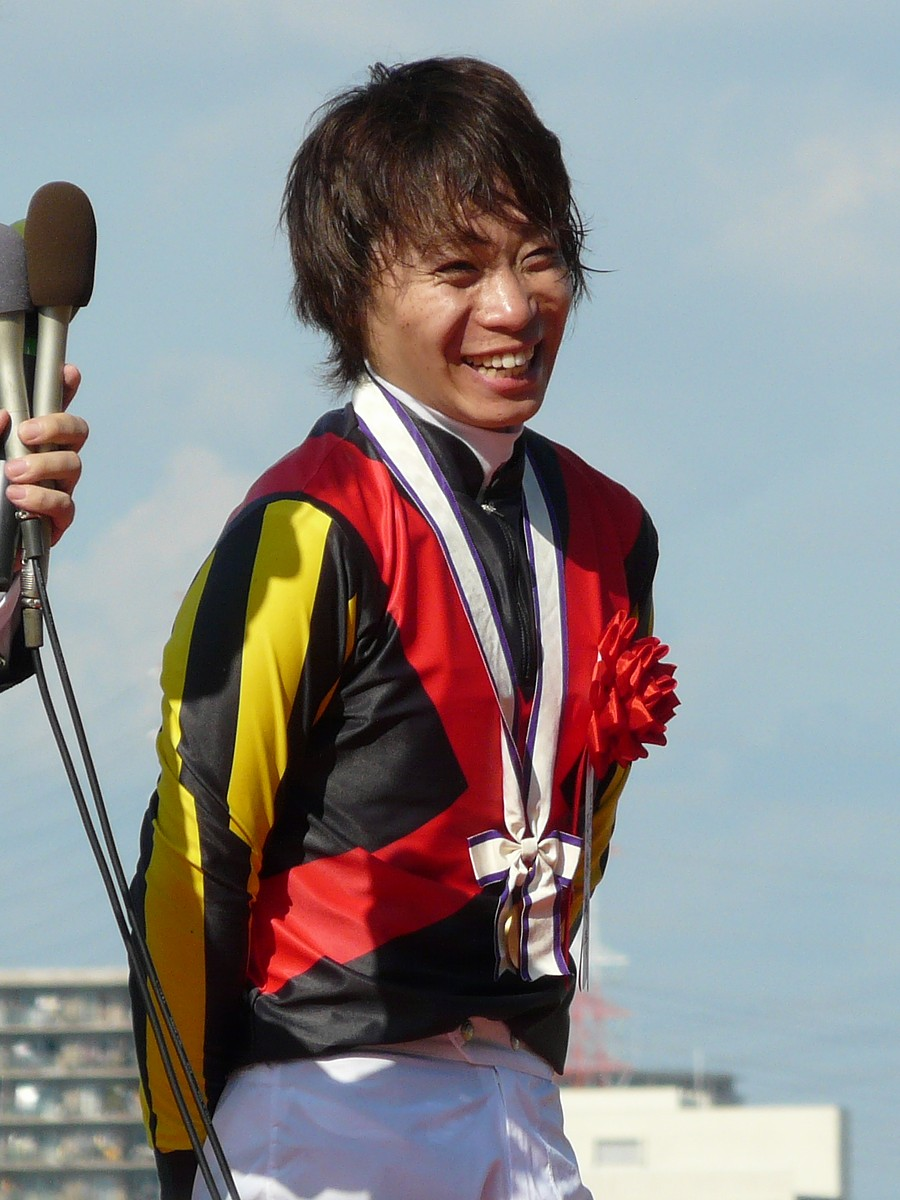
Kenichi Ikezoe

- Kenichi Ikezoe
- Yasunari Iwata

== J ==
- John Jackson
- Daryl Jacob
- Billy Jacobson
- Chris Johnson
- Richard Johnson
- Malcolm Johnston
- Linda Jones

== K ==
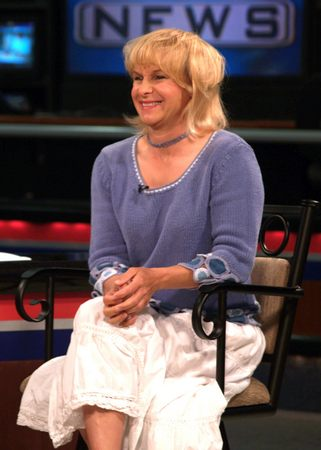
Julie Krone

- Willy Kan
- Stathi Katsidis
- Yuga Kawada
- Colin Keane
- Lizzie Kelly
- Pandu Khade
- Michael Kinane
- Rachel King
- Richard Kingscote
- Julie Krone

== L ==
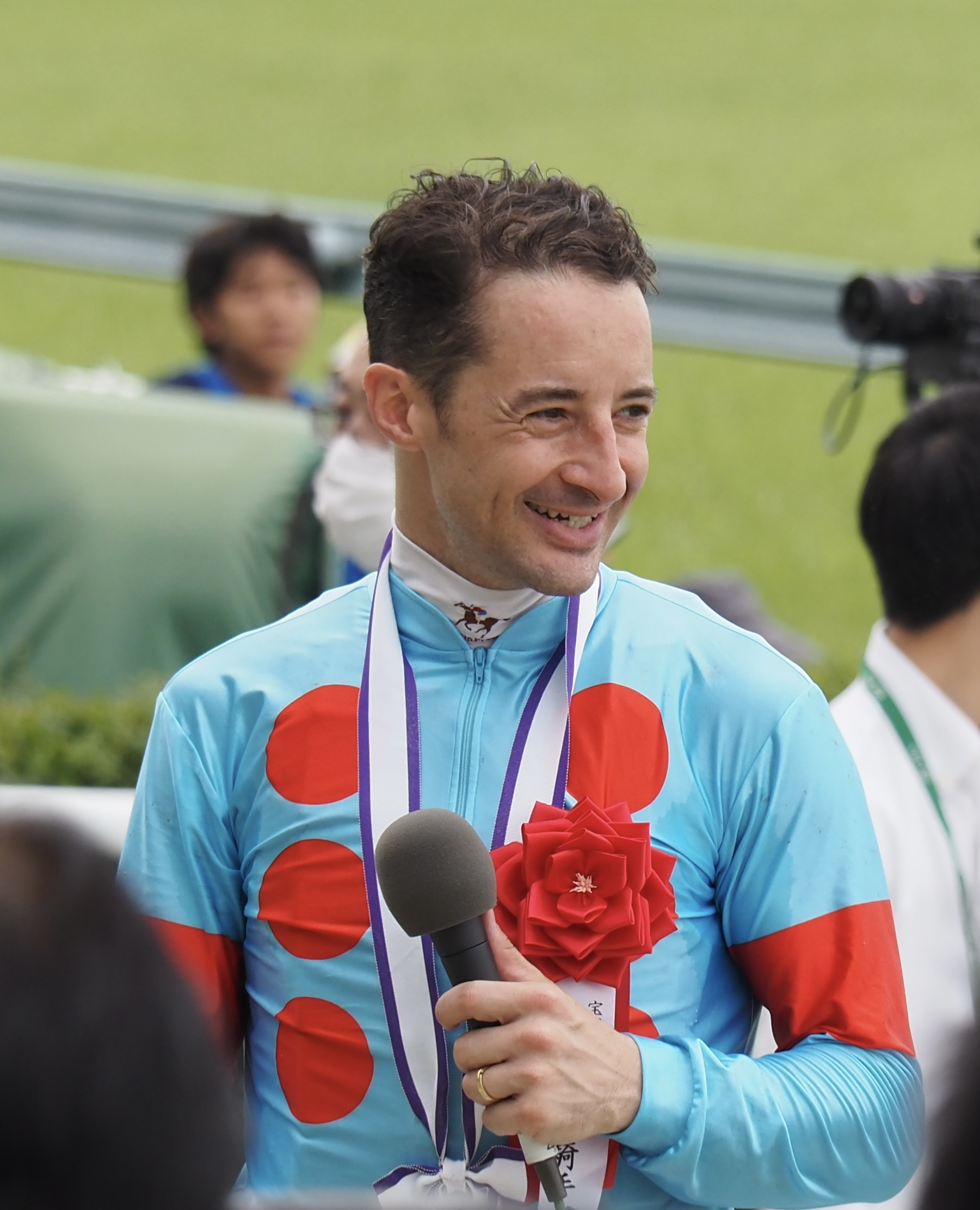
Christophe Lemaire

- Damian Lane
- Lucien Laurin
- Graham Lee
- Christophe Lemaire
- Aurélien Lemaitre
- Julien Leparoux
- Garret Lewis
- Geoff Lewis
- Oliver Lewis
- Jose Lezcano
- Carl Llewellyn
- Tommy Loates
- Johnny Loftus
- Johnny Longden
- Paco Lopez
- Tommy Lowrey
- Len Lungo
- Mike Luzzi

== M ==
Tony McCoy

- Harold Russell Maddock
- Jason Maguire
- Manfred K. L. Man
- John Mangle
- Ryan Mania
- Eddie Maple
- Rajiv Maragh
- Tom Marquand
- Mikio Matsunaga
- Kohei Matsuyama
- Chris McCarron
- Tony McCoy
- Kerrin McEvoy
- James McDonald
- Miguel Mena
- Joe Mercer
- Richard Migliore
- Kirsty Milczarek
- Walter Miller
- Kousei Miura
- Martin Molony
- George Moore
- Jamie Moore
- Ryan Moore
- Luke Morris
- David Mullins
- Isaac Murphy
- Bauyrzhan Murzabayev
- Johnny Murtagh

== N ==
- Corey Nakatani
- Rosie Napravnik
- Suraj Narredu
- Peter Niven

== O ==
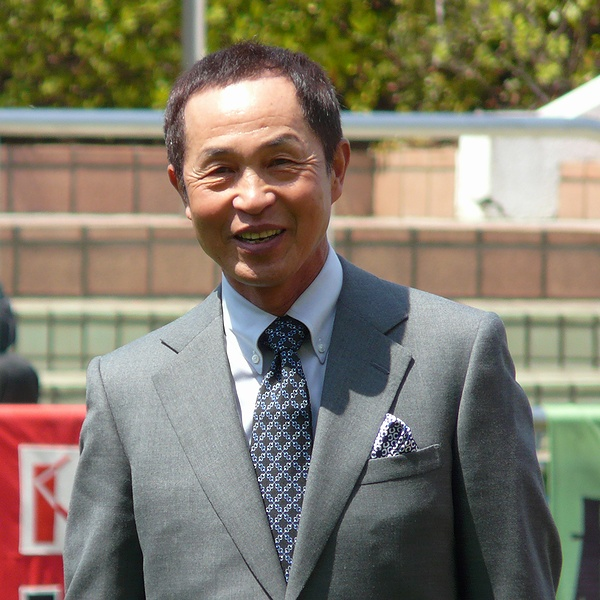
Yukio Okabe

- Joseph O'Brien
- Yukio Okabe
- Damien Oliver
- Henry Oliver
- Jonjo O'Neill
- Irad Ortiz Jr.
- José Ortiz
- Lance O'Sullivan

== P ==
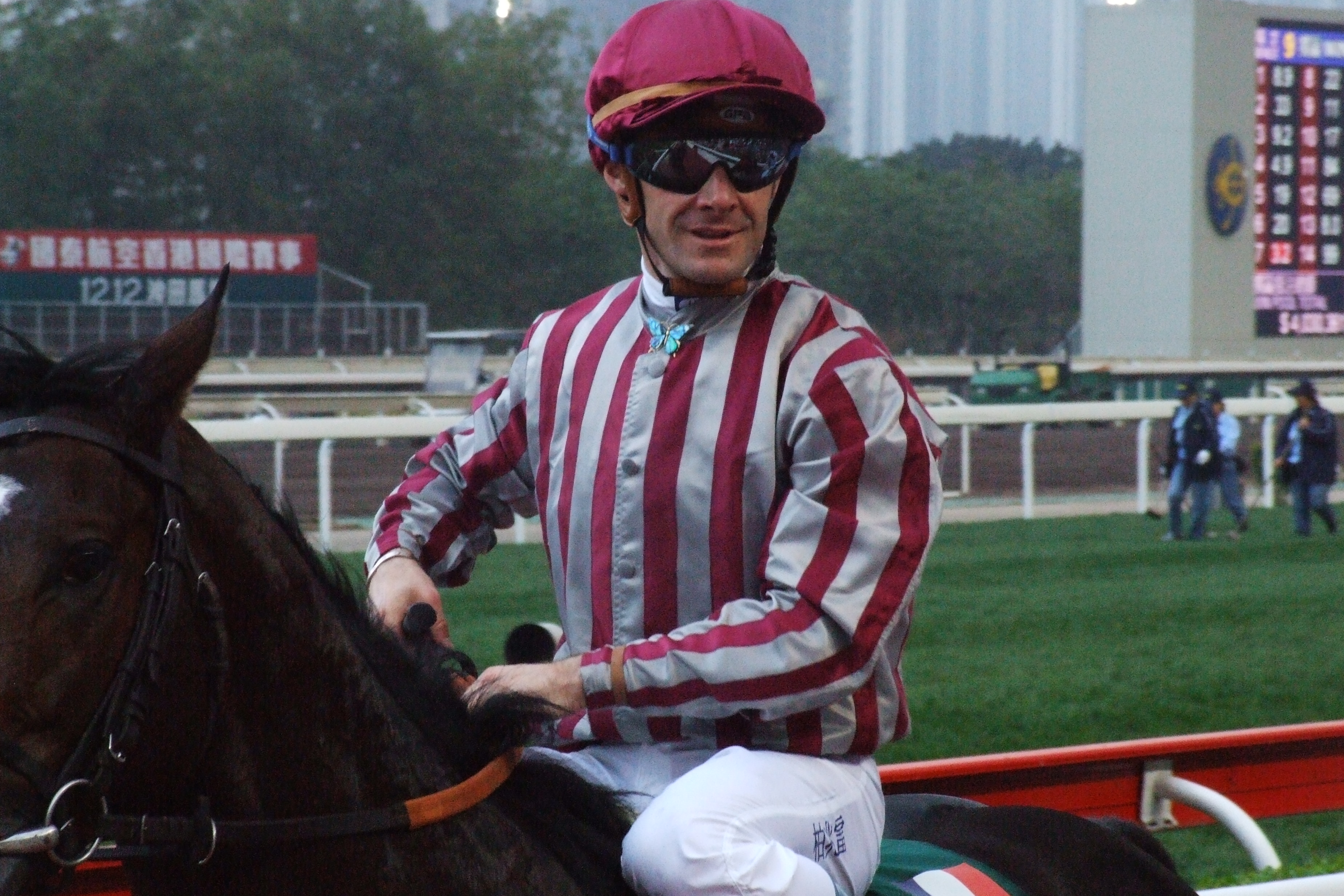
Olivier Peslier

- Freddie Palmer
- Deshawn L. Parker
- Johnathan Parkes
- Stéphane Pasquier
- Michelle Payne
- Billy Pearson
- Martin Pedroza
- Dave Penna
- T. J. Pereira
- James "Soup" Perkins
- Olivier Peslier
- Rene Piechulek
- Lester Piggott
- Yasin Pilavcılar
- Laffit Pincay Jr.
- Red Pollard
- Robbie Power
- Edgar Prado
- David Probert

== Q ==
- Tom Queally
- Jimmy Quinn
- Richard Quinn

== R ==
- Nash Rawiller
- Sam Renick
- Jorge Ricardo
- Sir Gordon Richards
- Michael Roberts
- Philip Robinson
- Willie Robinson
- Randy Romero
- Joel Rosario
- Jeremy Rose
- Katri Rosendahl
- Chris Russell
- Davy Russell

== S ==
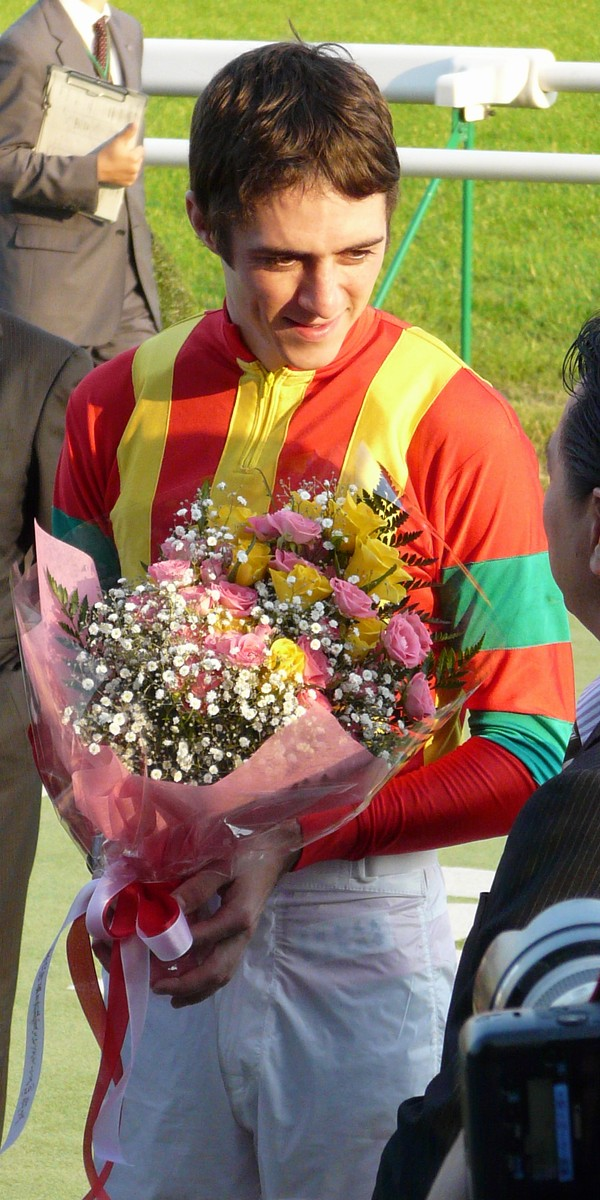
Christophe Soumillon

- Gabriel Saez
- Yves Saint-Martin
- Ryusei Sakai
- Katsuma Sameshima
- Jean-Luc Samyn
- Emanuel Jose Sanchez
- Ricardo Santana Jr.
- José Santos
- Peter Schiergen
- Michael Scudamore
- Peter Scudamore
- Cédric Ségeon
- Art Sherman
- Yoshitomi Shibata
- Hirofumi Shii
- Blake Shinn
- Bill Shoemaker
- Pesi Shroff
- Eurico Rosa da Silva
- Willie Simms
- Bill Skelton
- Bob Skelton
- Doug Smith
- Eph Smith
- Mike Smith
- Virginia Pinky Smith
- Pat Smullen
- Alex Solis
- Christophe Soumillon
- Silvestre de Sousa
- Jamie Spencer
- Y. S. Srinath
- Tommy Stack
- Andrasch Starke
- Greville Starkey
- Georges Stern
- Gary Stevens
- George Stevens
- Marlon St. Julien
- Kayla Stra
- Andreas Suborics
- Naosuke Sugai
- Chantal Sutherland
- Charlie Swan
- Wally Swinburn
- Walter Swinburn

== T ==
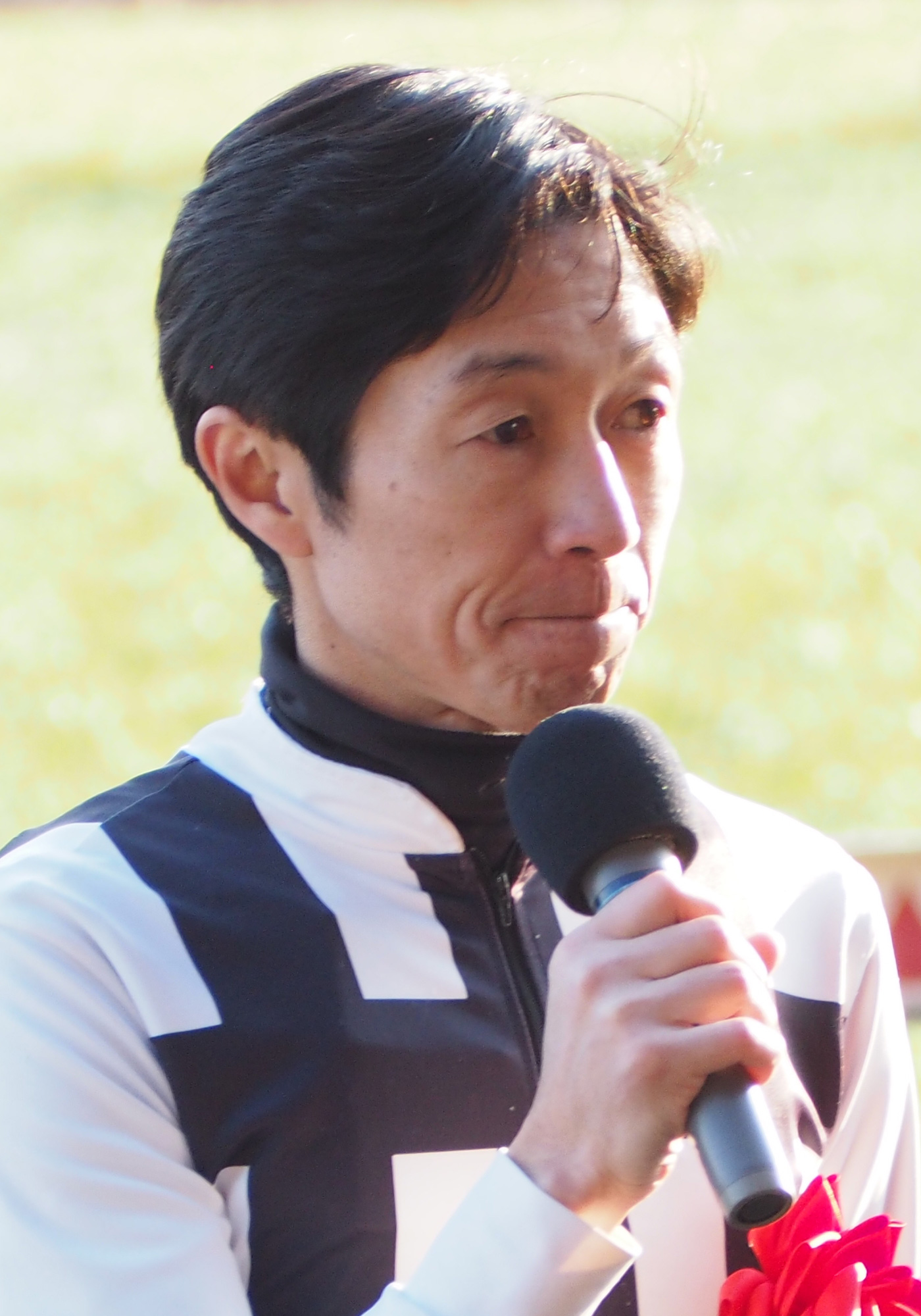
Yutaka Take

- Pat Taaffe
- Joe Talamo
- Koshiro Take
- Yutaka Take
- Brian Taylor
- Fred Templeman
- Sim Templeman
- Brent Thomson
- Terry J. Thompson
- Alicia Thornton
- Andrew Thornton
- Liam Treadwell
- Akihide Tsumura
- Daniel Tudhope
- Ron Turcotte
- Hayley Turner

== U ==
- Bobby Ussery

== V ==
- Pat Valenzuela
- Alice Van-Springsteen
- Josef Váňa
- Jacinto Vásquez
- Cornelio Velásquez
- John Velazquez
- Francine Villeneuve

== W ==
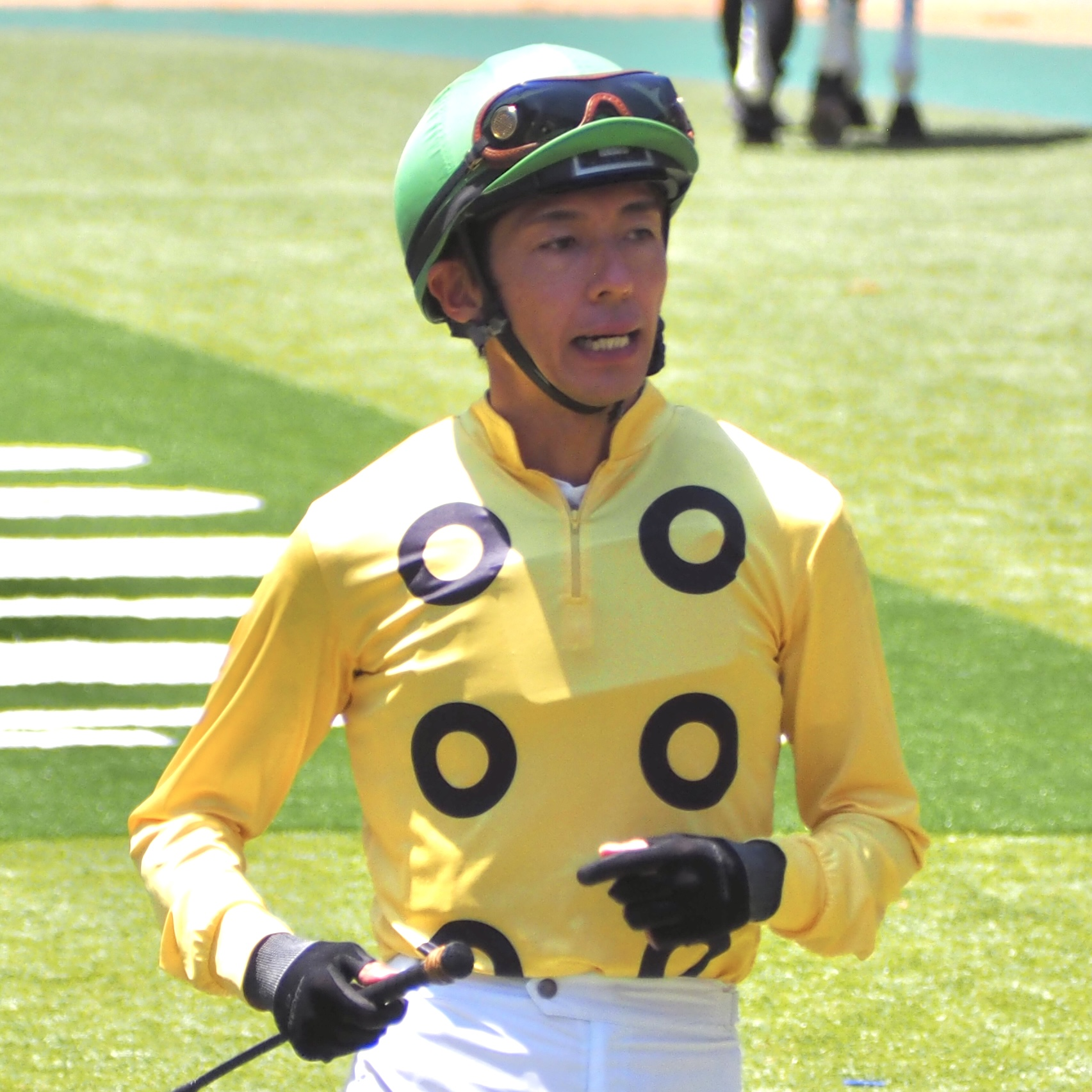
Ryuji Wada

- Ryuji Wada
- Billy Walker
- Michael Walker
- David Walsh
- Ruby Walsh
- Fulke Walwyn
- Tommy Weston
- Jack Westrope
- Elijah Wheatley
- Cheryl White
- Evan Williams
- Emma-Jayne Wilson
- Rick Wilson
- Jimmy Winkfield
- Fred Winter
- Otto Wonderly
- Hedley Woodhouse
- George Woolf
- Harry Wragg
- Wayne D. Wright

== Y ==
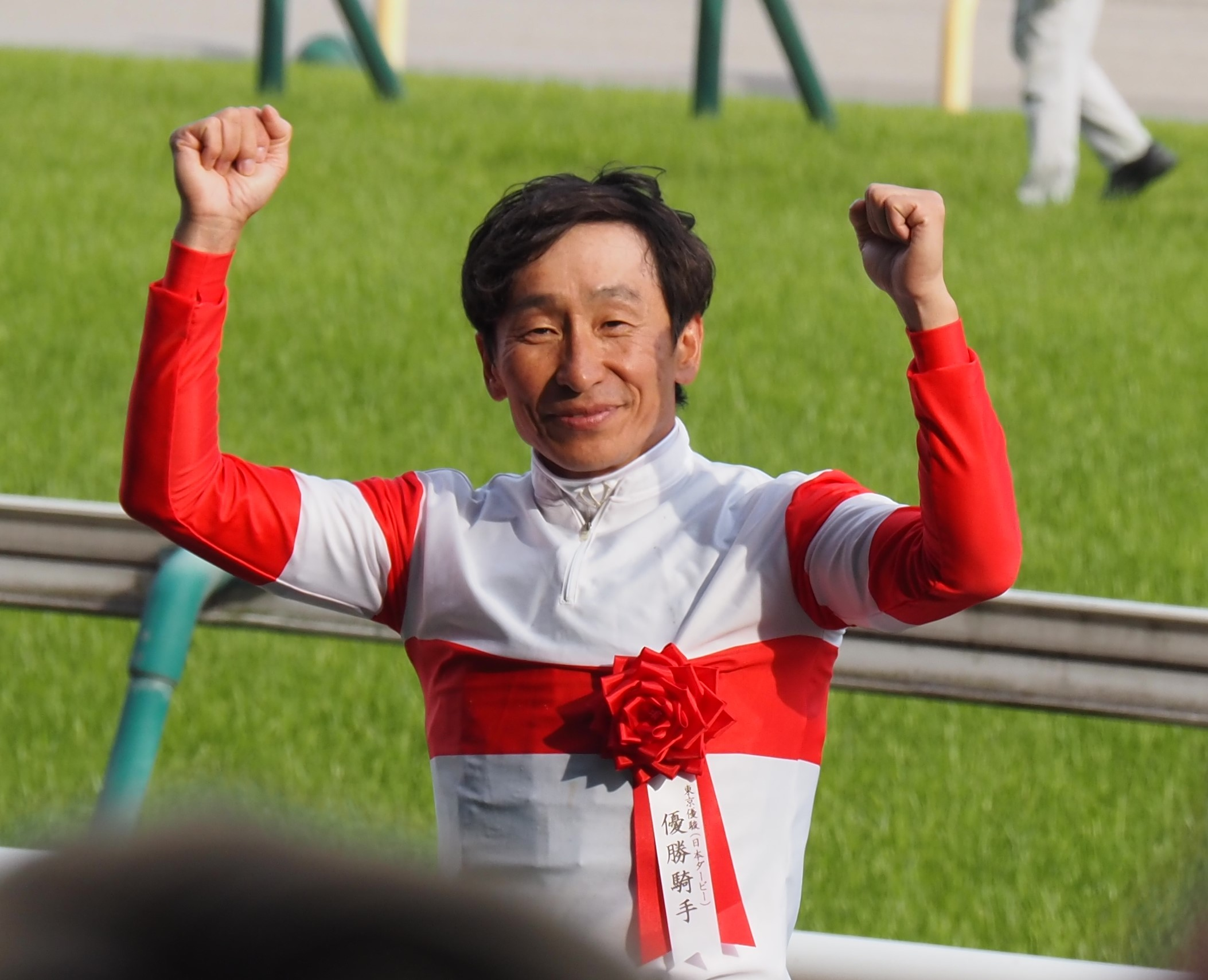
Norihiro Yokoyama

- Manuel Ycaza
- Kazuo Yokoyama
- Norihiro Yokoyama
- Takeshi Yokoyama
- Raymond York
