= Pandu Khade =

Indian jockey

Pandu Khade (born 1923 in Vadgaon, Kolhapur District, Maharashtra, India – died 22 October 1999 in Kolhapur) was an Indian jockey who played in India and abroad.

== Career ==
Khade was based at the premier Royal Western India Turf Club that comprised India's top racing circuit, the Mahalaxmi Racecourse in Bombay, and the Pune Race Course near Pune Cantonment. He rode many classic winners in the Indian 1000 Guineas, Indian 2000 Guineas, Indian Derby, Indian Oaks and Indian St Leger.

Khade also rode outside India accepting a generous offer from the Maharaja Gaekwar of Baroda to ride for him in England. He was the Maharajah’s retained jockey in India.

== Death ==
Khade died in Kolhapur at the age of 76. He is survived by a son and daughter.
