= Indian Derby =

Annual thoroughbred horse race in India

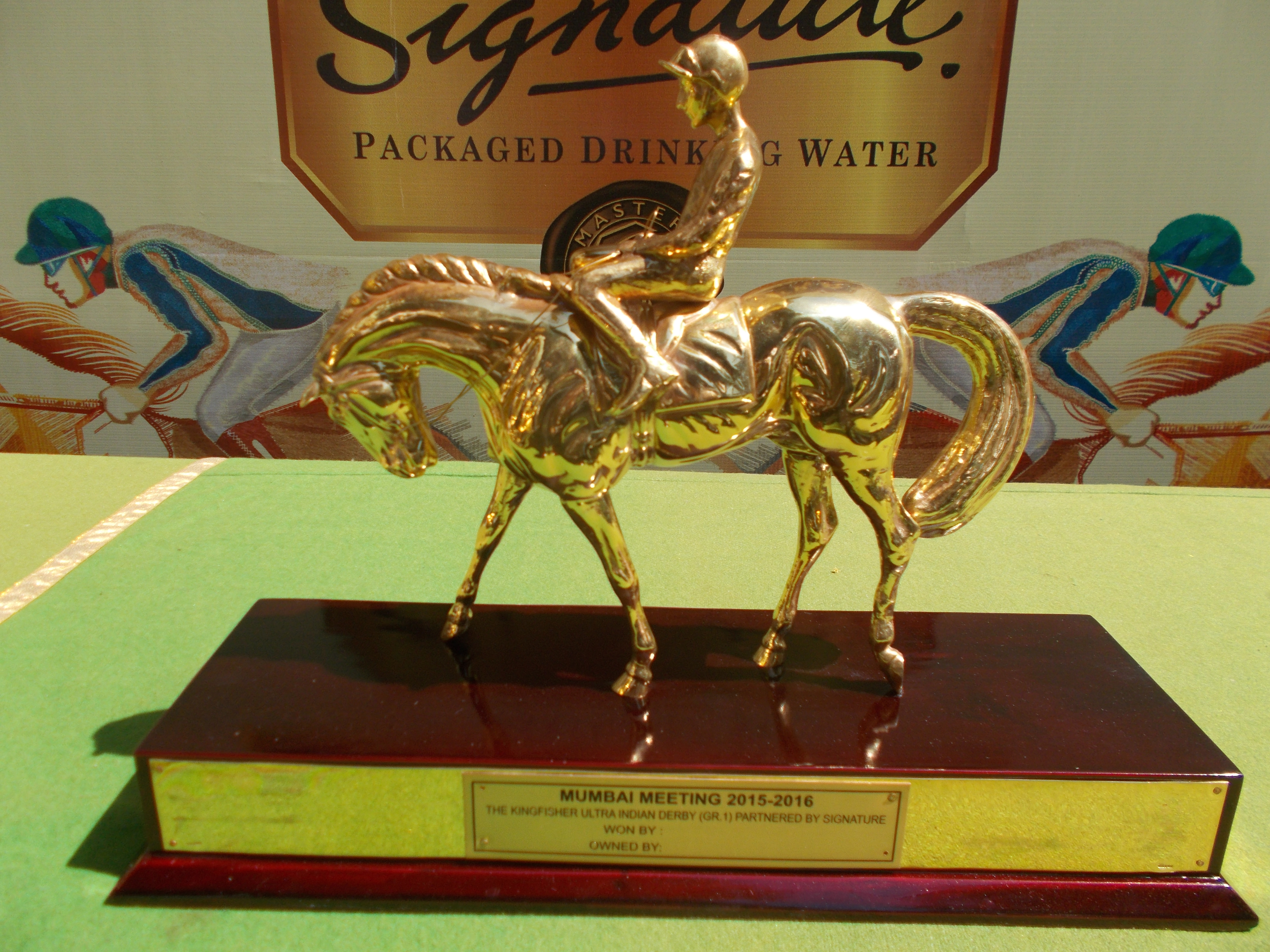
Kingfisher Ultra Indian Derby Trophy

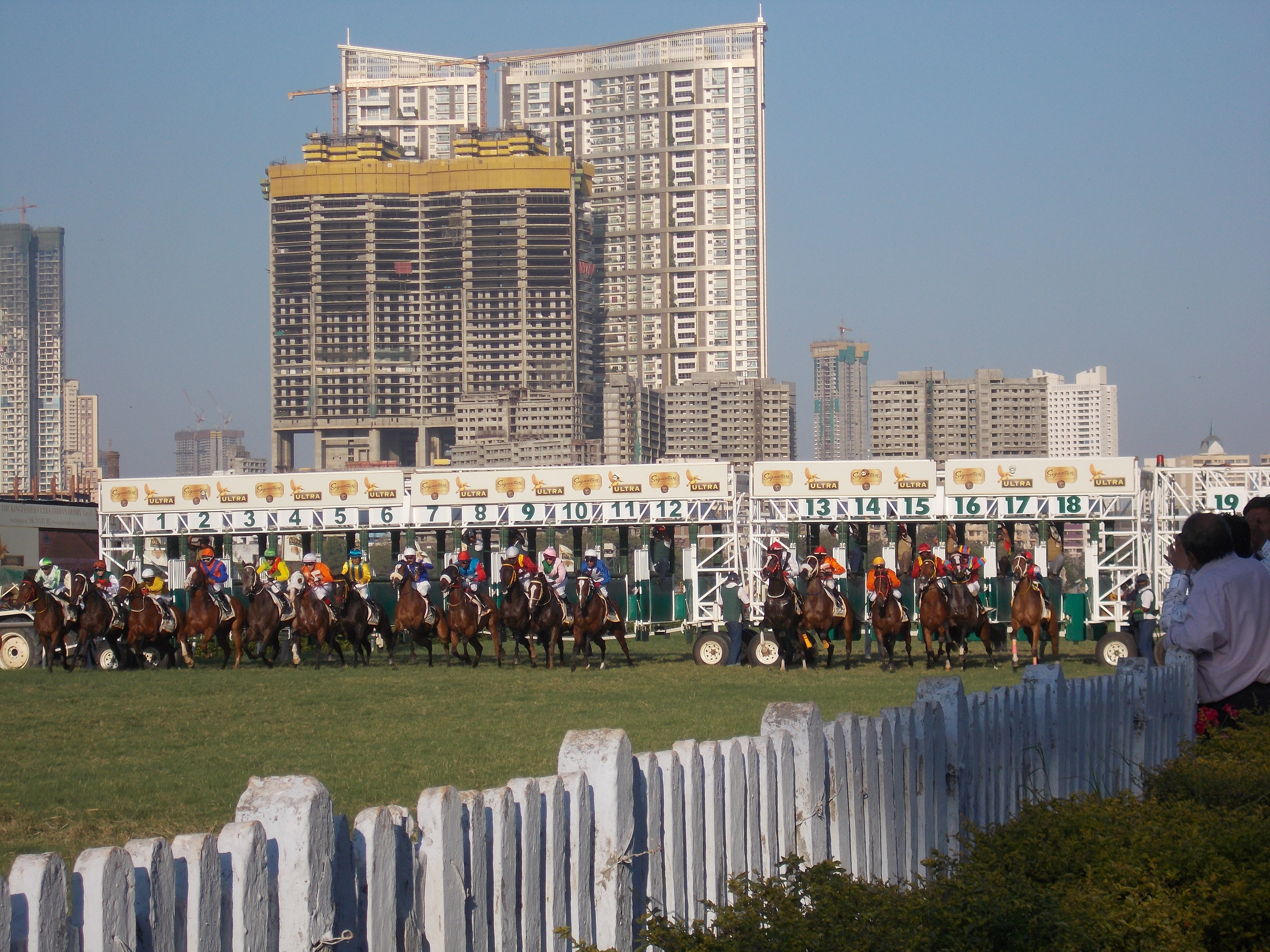
Indian Derby 2016

The Indian Derby is an annual Thoroughbred horse race. It is run over 2,400-metres and held on the first Sunday of February at the Mahalaxmi Racecourse in Mumbai.

== History ==
The "Indian Derby" is the premier horse racing event of the country held annually on the first Sunday of February. A derby is a type of horse race, named after the Epsom Derby, run at Epsom Downs Racecourse in England. It was named after for Edward Smith-Stanley, 12th Earl of Derby, who inaugurated the race in 1780.

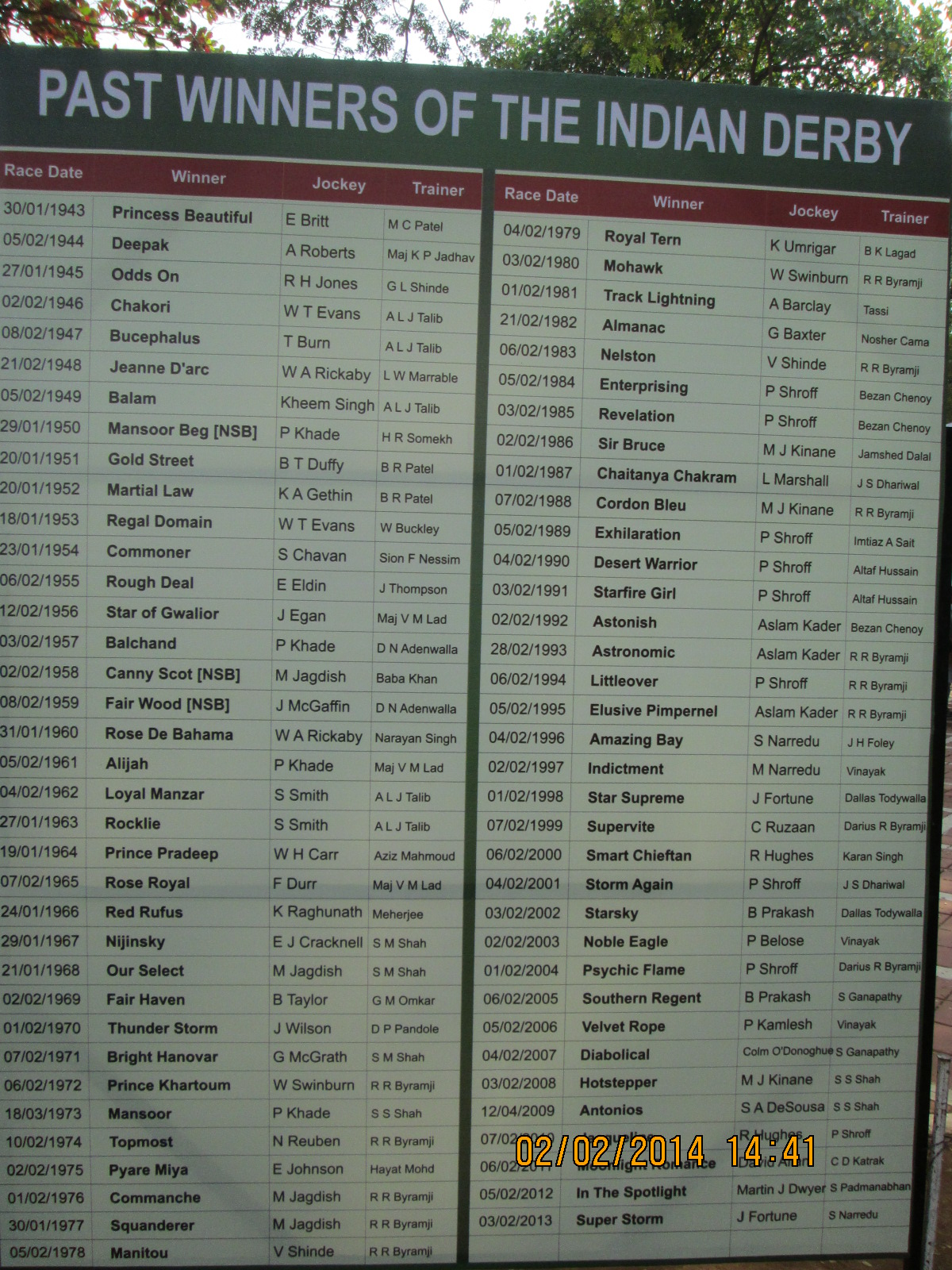
Indian Derby Winners since 1943

The Indian derby, later called the McDowell Indian Derby was sponsored by the United Breweries Ltd from 1984 Until 2022. It is one of the premier sporting activities in the city having the highest cash prize for any single sporting event in India. The race was first held in 1943 and was won by a filly Princess Beautiful, ridden by Edgar Britt.

There have been many exciting finishes to the Indian Derby but none have come close to the one that occurred on 8 February 1947, a filly named "Her Majesty" ridden by Australian jockey W.T Evans son of 1907 Melbourne Cup winning jockey William (Billy) Evans, had a dramatic fall after the start of the race but both the rider and the horse were brave enough to get back on their feet and run the race only to finish second to Bucephalus by a "nose". Two weeks later Her Majesty beat Bucephalus in the classic Indian St. Leger by twenty lengths.

== Derby winners ==
List of Indian derby winners:

Race Date	Winner	Sex	Bred At	Jockey	Trainer
01/02/2026	Fynbos	F	Nanoli Stud	Tom Marquand	Pesi Shroff
04/02/2025	Ranquelino	G	Manjri	A Sandesh	Darius R Byramji
04/02/2024	Enabler	C	Sohna	Yash Narredu	M Narredu
05/02/2023	Mirra	F	Usha/Mehra	Anthony Raj	Arjun Mangalorkar
06/02/2022	Zuccarelli	G	Nanoli Stud	P. Trevor	Pesi Shroff
28/03/2021	Immortality	F	Usha/Mehra	Suraj Narredu	Pesi Shroff
02/02/2020	War Hammer	C	Kunigal	Suraj Narredu	Prasana Kumar
03/02/2019	Star Superior	C	Poonawalla Group	Suraj Narredu	Rajesh Narredu
04/02/2018	Rochester	C	Manjri	C.S. Jodha	S K Sunderji
05/02/2017	Hall of Famer	F	Dashmesh	David Allan	S.Padmanabhan
07/02/2016	Desert God	C	Kunigal	David Allan	S Padmanabhan
01/02/2015	Be Safe	C	Hazara	Suraj Narredu	M Narredu
02/02/2014	Alaindair	G	Usha/Mehra	Y.S. Srinath	Altamash A Ahmed
03/02/2013	Super Storm	c	Hazara	Jimmy Fortune	S Narredu
05/02/2012	In The Spotlight	F	Poonawalla Group	Martin Dwyer	S Padmanabhan
06/02/2011	Moonlight Romance	F	Usha/Mehra	David Allan	C D Katrak
07/02/2010	Jacqueline	F	Sohna	Richard Hughes	Pesi Shroff
12/04/2009	Antonios	C	Nanoli	S A DeSousa	S S Shah
03/02/2008	Hotstepper	C	Kehelan	M J Kinane	S S Shah
04/02/2007	Diabolical	G	Manjri	Colm O'Donoghue	S Ganapathy
05/02/2006	Velvet Rope	G	Sohna	P Kamlesh	Vinayak
06/02/2005	Southern Regent	G	Usha/Mehra	B Prakash	S Ganapathy
01/02/2004	Psychic Flame	F	Usha/Mehra	Pesi Shroff	Darius R Byramji
02/02/2003	Noble Eagle	G	Nanoli	P Belose	Vinayak
03/02/2002	Starsky	G	Usha/Mehra	B Prakash	Dallas Todywalla
04/02/2001	Storm Again	C	Poonawalla Group	Pesi Shroff	J S Dhariwal
06/02/2000	Smart Chieftan	G	Poonawalla Group	Richard Hughes	Karan Singh
07/02/1999	Supervite	F	Nanoli	C Ruzaan	Darius R Byramji
01/02/1998	Star Supreme	C	Usha/Mehra	J Fortune	Dallas Todywalla
02/02/1997	Indictment	C	Usha/Mehra	M Narredu	Vinayak
04/02/1996	Amazing Bay	F	Poonawalla Group	Satish Narredu	J H Foley
05/02/1995	Elusive Pimpernel	C	Dashmesh/Hargobind	Aslam Kader	Rashid Byramji
06/02/1994	Littleover	F	Manjri	Pesi Shroff	Rashid Byramji
28/02/1993	Astronomic	C	Dashmesh/Hargobind	Aslam Kader	Rashid Byramji
02/02/1992	Astonish	F	Poonawalla Group	Aslam Kader	Bezan Chenoy
03/02/1991	Starfire Girl	F	Poonawalla Group	Pesi Shroff	Altaf Hussain
04/02/1990	Desert Warrior	C	Poonawalla Group	Pesi Shroff	Altaf Hussain
05/02/1989	Exhilaration	C	Poonawalla Group	Pesi Shroff	Imtiaz A Sait
07/02/1988	Cordon Bleu	F	Poonawalla Group	M J Kinane	Rashid Byramji
01/02/1987	Chaitanya Chakram	C	Dashmesh/Hargobind	L Marshall	J S Dhariwal
02/02/1986	Sir Bruce	C	Doaba/Galloping	M J Kinane	Jamshed Dalal
03/02/1985	Revelation	F	Usha/Mehra	Pesi Shroff	Bezan Chenoy
05/02/1984	Enterprising	C	Usha/Mehra	Pesi Shroff	Bezan Chenoy
06/02/1983	Nelston	C	Usha/Mehra	V Shinde	C A Kutappa
21/02/1982	Almanac	C	Usha/Mehra	G Baxter	Nosher Cama
01/02/1981	Track Lightning	C	Usha/Mehra	A Barclay	Tassi
03/02/1980	Mohawk	C	Yeravada	W Swinburn	Rashid Byramji
04/02/1979	Royal Tern	C	Sewania	Karl Umrigar	B K Lagad
05/02/1978	Manitou	C	Usha/Mehra	V Shinde	Rashid Byramji
30/01/1977	Squanderer	C	Yeravada	M Jagdish	Rashid Byramji
01/02/1976	Commanche	C	Yeravada	M Jagdish	Rashid Byramji
02/02/1975	Pyare Miya	C	Kolhapur	E Johnson	Hayat Mohd
10/02/1974	Topmost	C	Kunigal	N Reuben	Rashid Byramji
18/03/1973	Mansoor	G	Manjri	Pandu Khade	S S Shah
06/02/1972	Prince Khartoum	C	Greenacres	W Swinburn	Rashid Byramji
07/02/1971	Bright Hanovar	C	Yeravada	G McGrath	S M Shah
01/02/1970	Thunder Storm	G	Manjri	J Wilson	D P Pandole
02/02/1969	Fair Haven	F	Greenacres	B Taylor	G M Omkar
21/01/1968	Our Select	C	Yeravada	M Jagdish	S M Shah
29/01/1967	Nijinsky	C	Manjri	E J Cracknell	S M Shah
24/01/1966	Red Rufus	C	Kolhapur	K Raghunath	Meherjee
07/02/1965	Rose Royal	F	Greenacres	F Durr	Maj V M Lad
19/01/1964	Prince Pradeep	C	Yeravada	W H Carr	Aziz Mahmoud
27/01/1963	Rocklie	F	Jammu	S Smith	A L J Talib
04/02/1962	Loyal Manzar	C	Manjri	S Smith	A L J Talib
05/02/1961	Alijah	C	Manjri	Pandu Khade	Maj V M Lad
31/01/1960	Rose De Bahama	F	Manjri	W A Rickaby	Narayan Singh
08/02/1959	Fair Wood[NSB]	C	Kunigal	J McGaffin	D N Adenwalla
02/02/1958	Canny Scot[NSB]	C	Broadacres	M Jagdish	Baba Khan
03/02/1957	Balchand	C	Yeravada	Pandu Khade	D N Adenwalla
12/02/1956	Star of Gwalior	C	Manjri	J Egan	Maj V M Lad
06/02/1955	Rough Deal	C	Kunigal	E Eldin	J Thompson
23/01/1954	Commoner	C	Baroda	S Chavan	Sion F Nessim
18/01/1953	Regal Domain	C	Western India	W T Evans	W Buckley
20/01/1952	Martial Law	C	Baroda	K A Gethin	B R Patel
20/01/1951	Gold Street	C	Yeravada	B T Duffy	B R Patel
29/01/1950	Mansoor Beg[NSB]	C	Renala	Pandu Khade	H R Somekh
05/02/1949	Balam	C	Renala	Kheem Singh	A L J Talib
21/02/1948	Jeanne D'arc	F	Baroda	W A Rickaby	L W Marrable
08/02/1947	Bucephalus	C	Meher Shah	T Burn	A L J Talib
02/02/1946	Chakori	F	Bhopal	W T Evans	A L J Talib
27/01/1945	Odds On	F	Montgomery	R H Jones	G L Shinde
05/02/1944	Deepak	C	Renala	A Roberts	Maj K P Jadhav
30/01/1943	Princess Beautiful	F	Renala	Edgar Britt	M C Patel

== See also ==
- Mahalaxmi Racecourse
- Royal Western India Turf Club
