= Rashid Byramji =

Indian horse trainer (1934–2022)

- Occupation: Horse trainer
- Born: 5 November 1934; Bombay, British Raj
- Died: 29 January 2022 (aged 87); Bengaluru, Karnataka, India
- Spouse(s): Dolly Nazir

Significant horses
- Elusive Pimpernel, Squanderer

Rashid Byramji (5 November 1934 – 29 January 2022) was an Indian horse trainer. He was popularly known as the "horse whisperer" of Indian horse racing. In a career spanning over six decades, Byramji held the records for 3,170 wins including 230 classics. He was the only trainer to have had 10 Indian Derby winners and 12 Indian Invitation Cup winners.

== Early life ==
Byramji was born on 5 November 1934 into a parsi family of horse trainers. He was exposed to horses at an young age watching his grandfather, Byramji Rustomji, and his father, Rustomji Byramji, train horses. He completed his schooling in Bombay.

== Career ==
Byramji obtained his trainers' license at 21 from the Royal Western India Turf Club (RWITC) in 1955. He started his training career working on four horses provided by Indian businessman and founder of the Serum Institute of India, Cyrus S. Poonawalla. Byramji had his first victory within six months of starting out when he trained Lingamala to victory. He would go on to win four more races with the same horse.

This initial streak of victories was followed by a lull, in which he did not see many victories. Byramji went during this time to the stable owner, S. A. Irani, and asked to be relieved of his duties. Irani, however, persisted and Byramji was back to winning ways, winning nine of the next races in a row. He moved to Bangalore after a misunderstanding with the stewards at the RWITC in Bombay in 1965. He won his first derby in Bangalore, and followed it up with an Indian derby and an invitation cup victory.

In a career spanning six decades, he held the all-India record at 3,170 wins, including 230 classics, and was the only trainer to have had 10 Indian Derby winners and 12 Indian Invitation Cup winners. Byramji was crowned 'Champion Trainer' 42 times in a career that started in 1956. He also held the record for two hat-tricks in the Indian Derby and three hat-tricks in the Indian turf invitation cups. Through his career, he won 11 consecutive Bangalore Summer Championships. In an article on his death, The Hindu newspaper noted that he "took the art of training thoroughbreds to a different level altogether and no other trainer in the annals of the Indian Turf has made such an incredible impact on the Sport."

Byramji obtained his doctorate degree from the University of Glasgow, Scotland for conditioning of horses. He trained both all-time great horses seen on Indian turf, Elusive Pimpernel (won 22 of 23 starts) and Squanderer (won 18 of 19 starts). Through his career, he worked with various owners, including Vijay Mallya, Cyrus Poonawalla, Sunit Khatau and jockeys, including Pesi Shroff, Aslam Kader, and Lester Piggott.

Byramji retired at the end of the Bangalore winter season in March 2017.

=== Horses trained ===
==== Indian Derby winners ====
- Prince Khartoum (1972)
- Topmost (1974)
- Commanche (1976)
- Squanderer (1977)
- Manitou (1978)
- Mohawk (1980)
- Track Lightning (1981)
- Cordon Bleu (1988)
- Astronomic (1993)
- Littleover (1994)
- Elusive Pimpernel (1995)

==== Indian Turf Invitation Cup winners ====
- Prince Khartoum (Chennai, 1972)
- Topmost (Mumbai, 1974)
- Comanche (Chennai, 1976)
- Squanderer (Bengaluru, 1977)
- Manitou (Hyderabad, 1978)
- Everynsky (Kolkata, 1980)
- Track Lightning (Chennai, 1981)
- Almanac (Bengaluru, 1982)
- Delage (Chennai, 1991)
- Bugs Bunny (Bengaluru, 1992)
- Adler (Hyderabad, 1993)
- Elusive Pimpernel (Kolkata, 1995)

== Personal life ==
A resident of Bangalore from 1965 until his death, Byramji was married to Dolly Nazir, a swimmer who competed in the 1952 Helsinki Olympics. His son Darius has followed in his footsteps to be a horse trainer as well.

Byramji died at his home in Bangalore, on 29 January 2022, at the age of 87.
