= Umrigar =

Umrigar is a surname. Notable people with the surname include:

- Fenil Umrigar (born 1996), Indian model and actress
- Karl Umrigar (1960–1979), Indian jockey
- Polly Umrigar (1926–2006), Indian cricketer
- Thrity Umrigar, Indian-American journalist, critic, and novelist
