= Mahalaxmi, Mumbai =

Coordinates: 18°59′N 72°48′E

Mahalaxmi
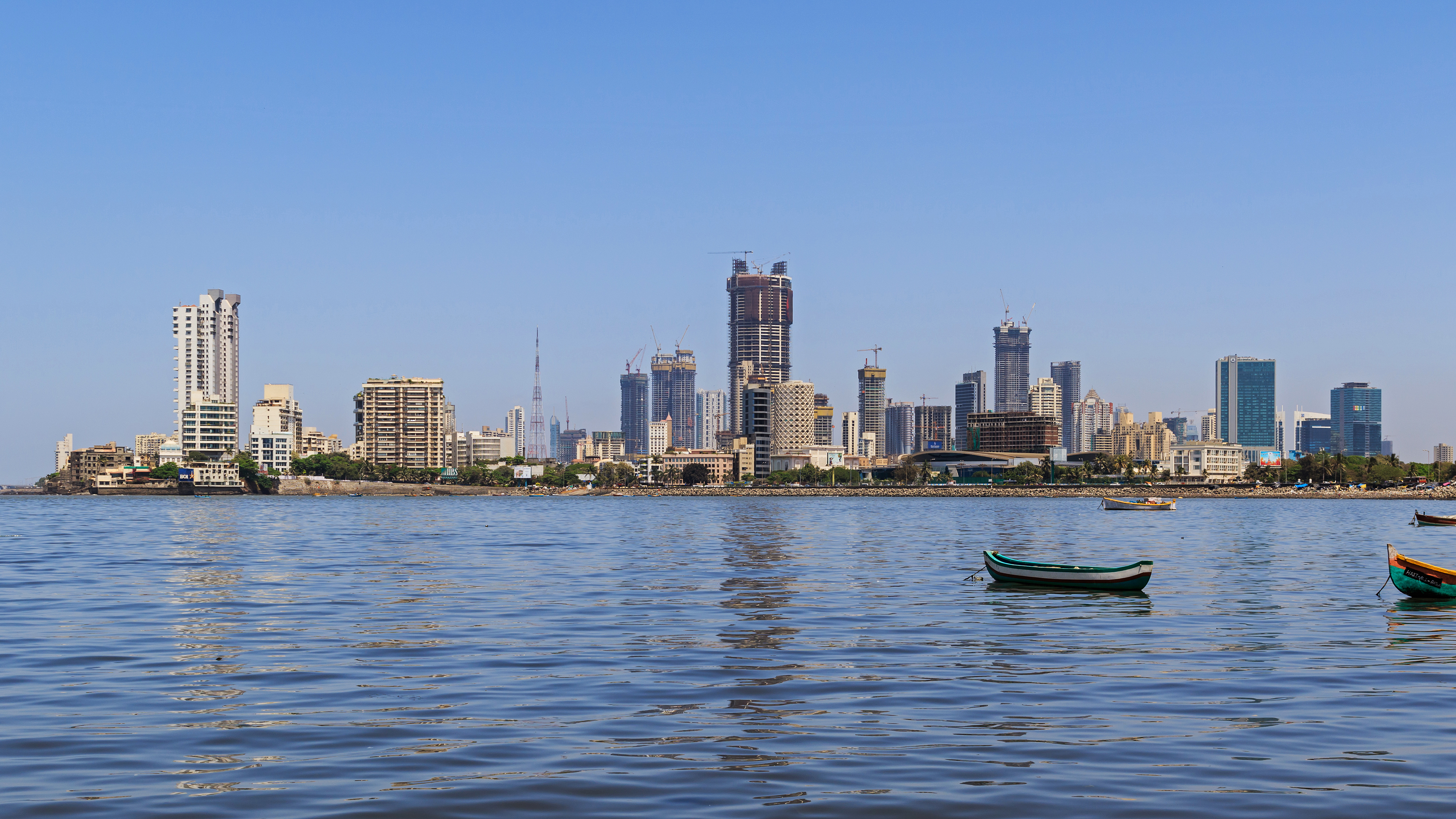
- Mahalaxmi Neighbourhood

- Location within Mumbai
- Country: India
- State: Maharashtra
- City: Mumbai

Government
  - Type: Municipal Corporation
  - Body: Brihanmumbai Municipal Corporation
- Demonym: Mumbaikar

Languages
  - Official: Marathi, Hindi & English
- Time zone: UTC+5:30 (IST)
- PIN: 400011
- Area code: 022

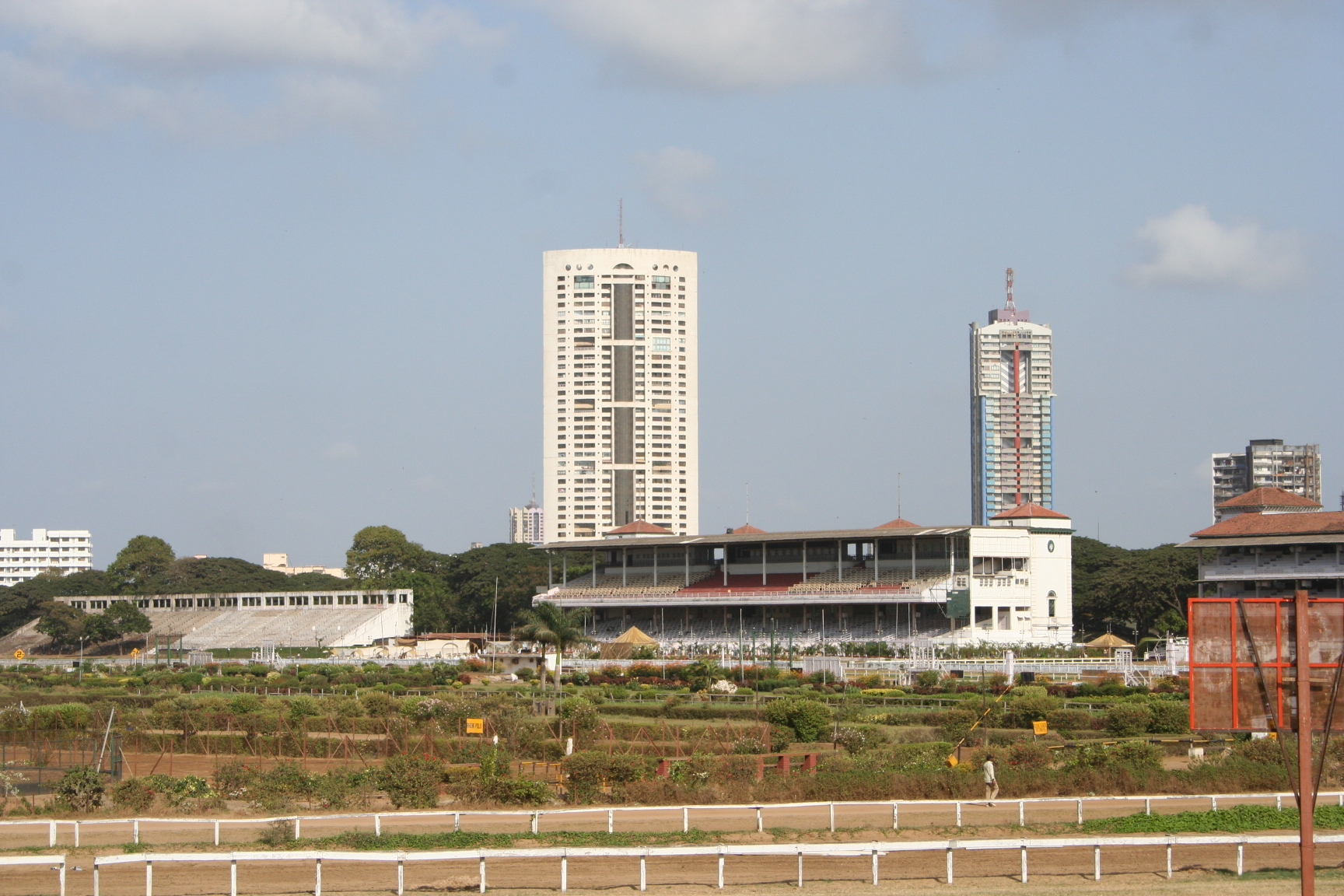
Mahalaxmi Racecourse

Mahalaxmi is an upscale, affluent neighbourhood in the city of Mumbai, India. It is known for Royal Western India Turf Club's Mahalaxmi Racecourse with horse races every year having visitors from around the world. It is particularly well-known for housing the Mahalaxmi Temple, dedicated to the Hindu goddess of wealth and fortune.

== History ==
Mahalaxmi Temple is one of the most famous temples in Mumbai. Built around 1785, the history of this temple is supposedly connected with the building of the Hornby Vellard. Supposedly, after portions of the sea-wall of the Vellard collapsed twice, the chief engineer, a Pathare Prabhu, dreamed of a Lakshmi statue in the sea near Worli. An underwater search recovered it and he subsequently constructed a temple for it. After this, the work on the Vellard was completed without any problems.

The Mahalaxmi Racecourse is located in the area.
