= Jemmy Grimshaw =

British flat racing Champion Jockey

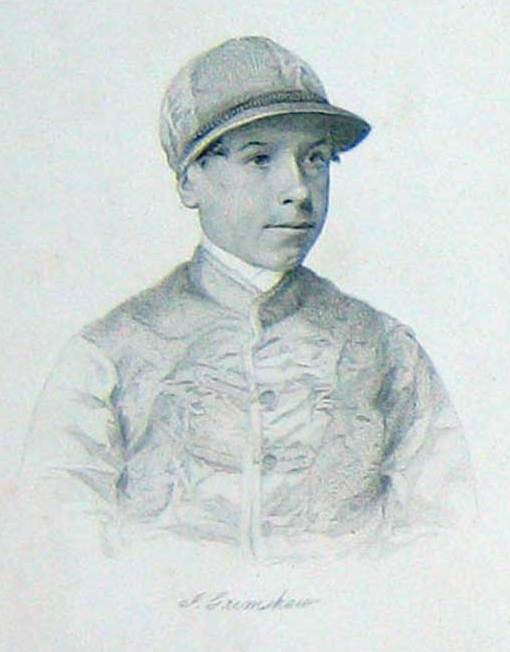
- Jemmy Grimshaw, from the frontispiece of Baily's Magazine, 1865

Personal information
- Born: 29 March 1846 Bolton, England
- Died: 12 December 1889 Pardubice, Bohemia
- Occupation: Jockey

Horse racing career
- Sport: Horse racing

Major racing wins
- 1000 Guineas Stakes (1870); St Leger Stakes (1870)

James "Jemmy" Grimshaw (29 March 1846 – 12 December 1889) was a Classic-winning jockey and the British flat racing Champion Jockey of 1864. He rode 164 winners in that year, a then record, and one that would stand for another 11 years, until the emergence of Fred Archer.

== Biography ==
In his early career, he was apprentice to a trainer called Mr Brown and had his first race in 1860. Between 1860 and 1865 he won 114 of 351 races, including the 1862 Cesarewitch Handicap on Hartington, the 1864 Cesarewitch on Thalestris, the Northumberland Plate on Queen of Trumps, the Portland Handicap on Persuasion, the Liverpool Autumn Cup on Tartar and the Ascot Stakes on Hippolyta.

Between 1865 and 1869 he rode for the Marquis of Hastings, on a retainer of £600 per year, plus £5 per win and £3 per loss (which amounted to around £2,000 - £3,000 per year), but was sacked for refusing to ride what he considered an unsafe horse. During this time, he was second by a neck in the 1867 Derby on Marksman.

In 1870, he won two Classics – the 1000 Guineas on Hester and the St Leger Stakes on Hawthornden. He then moved abroad and for a while he was a successful jockey and trainer in Austria and Germany, but he died penniless of cancer in Pardubice on 12 December 1889, leaving a widow and six children. One son, Herbert, also became a jockey, but was convicted of robbery.

A lightweight jockey, he was called "one of the most brilliant riders of his day", whose achievements in the 1860s were referred to as "a striking chapter in the Turf history of that time".

== Major wins ==
(United Kingdom) Great Britain

- 1000 Guineas Stakes - Hester (1870)
- St Leger Stakes - Hawthornden (1870)

== See also ==
- List of jockeys
