= Amar Naik =

Indian gangster

Amar Naik was an Indian gangster.

== Life ==
Naik started his criminal career in 1980. There were around 200 criminals in his gang.

He had assassinated industrialist Sunit Khatau. A personal diary of Naik contained the names and telephone numbers of a number of police officers. Some of these reported instances of a nexus between leading politicians and the underworld were provided in newspapers.

Investigators found Naik had visited the US, Canada, Australia and other countries. His bank accounts having more than Rs. 5 lakh were frozen. After 8 months on 10 August, 1996, he was killed in an encounter by Vijay Salaskar.

Patronized by Shiv Sena, his encounter was condemned by Shiv Sena's newspaper Saamana as "selective killing of Hindu and Marathi mafia dons". After his death, his gang was overtaken by his brother Ashwin Naik.

== In popular culture ==
In 2021, Bollywood movie Mumbai Saga based on Naik's life was released.
