= Mary Bacon =

American Thoroughbred jockey and model (1948–1991)

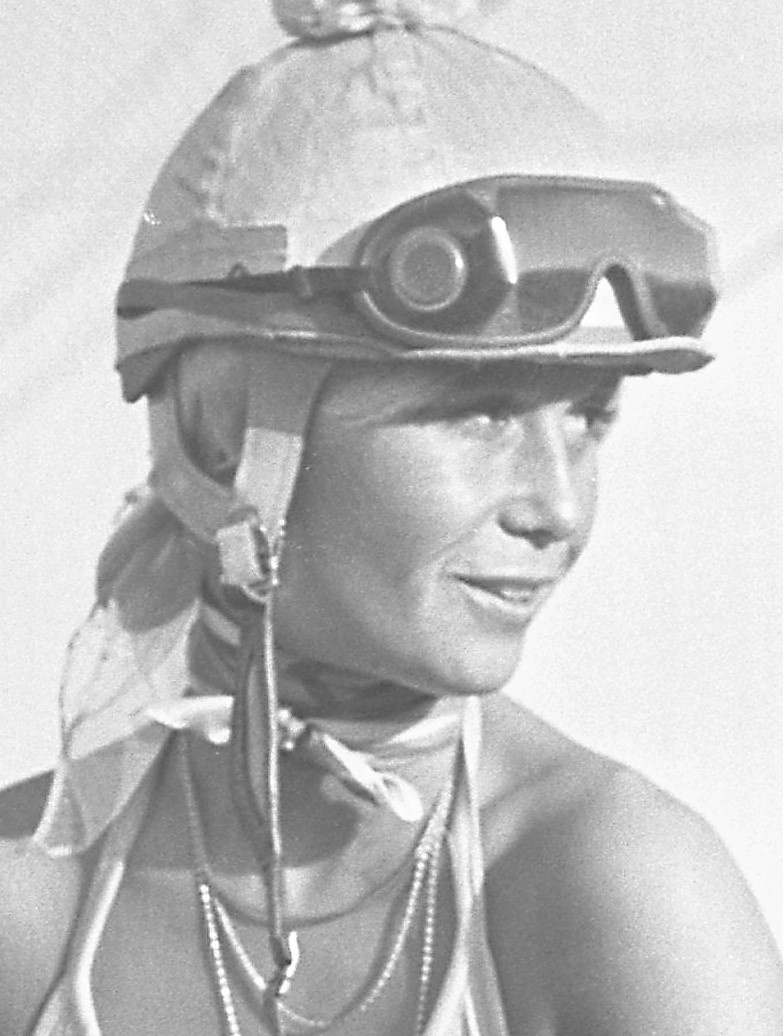
- Bacon in 1975

Personal information
- Born: January 1, 1948 Chicago, Illinois, United States
- Died: June 8, 1991 (aged 43) Fort Worth, Texas, United States
- Occupation: Jockey

Horse racing career
- Sport: Horse racing
- Career wins: 286
- Updated on May 18, 2010

Mary Steedman Bacon Anderson (January 1, 1948 – June 8, 1991) was an American Thoroughbred jockey and model.

== Early life ==
She was born in Chicago, Illinois, and raised in Toledo, Ohio, by her father, a one-time big band pianist later involved in construction, and her mother who was a stay at home mother. She had one sister and brother.

== Early career ==
While having no horses of her own as a child, she interacted with them at a neighboring farm. In high school, Steedman found work as an outrider, helping in morning workouts and accompanying horses to the starting gate at Toledo's Raceway Park.

Steedman saved her money and after graduation went to school in England, where she earned an instructor's degree from a riding academy. When she returned to the United States, she taught riding at a hunt club outside of Detroit. She galloped horses on mornings at Detroit Race Course.

== Career ==
Bacon won her first race June 5, 1969. She won 55 times in 396 races that first year. She finished in the money 160 times. In 1974 two weeks into the spring meeting at New York's Aqueduct Racetrack Bacon for the first time ranked among the track's top ten jockeys.

== Media coverage ==
She once appeared in the fashion magazine Vogue and modeled nationally for cosmetics giant Revlon after being chosen as their Charlie ad campaign.

Bacon appeared in a Playboy magazine pictorial in June 1973 titled "Woman's Work", which featured women who worked in predominantly male occupations.

In June 1974 came a Newsweek cover for a story on women emerging in sports. The news magazine used 14 photographs inside to help illustrate its story. Bacon's was the only face to appear more than once.

== Ku Klux Klan participation and media downfall ==
In April 1975, while riding at the Fair Grounds Race Course in New Orleans, she attended a Ku Klux Klan rally in Walker, Louisiana. Asked to speak, she was introduced to a crowd of 2,700 by the national director of the Knights of the Ku Klux Klan, David Duke.

"We are not just a bunch of illiterate Southern nigger-killers," she told the rally. "We are good, white, Christian people working for a white America. When one of your wives or one of your sisters gets raped by a nigger, maybe you'll get smart and join the Klan". A local television station filmed the speech. In an editorial, The Wall Street Journal would refer to her as "The Klansman's Jane Fonda".

Bacon told People magazine at the time she was confident the remarks would have no impact. "People will only worry about what I do from the starting gate to the finish line—not about what I do in my personal life," she said. "I'm paid to win races."

Further, she told the publication that the Klan was not racist and that she was not either. "All the records I buy are Motown records," she says stoutly. "Some of my best friends are blacks."

At the time People magazine stated there is speculation that all this could merely be a sad attempt on Bacon's part to focus renewed public attention on herself. "Once I was called the Bunny Jockey because of Playboy," she said, "now I'll be known as the one in the white sheets."

Almost immediately, her endorsement contracts were canceled with Revlon and Dutch Masters. Trainers looked for riders carrying less baggage. She had 323 mounts in 1974; the next year, she would get only 143; by 1976, her total fell to 38.

She rode for a week in November 1978 at Japan's Oi Racecourse and enjoyed success with the mounts she received. Per an article for Stars and Stripes magazine she had by mid-week ridden 12 horses, put three of them across the finish line first and one second-place finish and picked up more than five million yen ($26,344 plus change) in purses.

== Injuries and a career end ==
In May 1979, she was seriously injured in a starting-gate accident at a small track in East St. Louis, Ill. Her mount flipped. The horse landed on her.

She sued for negligence, claiming that the gate had been unsafe. She won and was awarded a $3 million settlement. She never collected. The track declared bankruptcy and went out of business.

On June 10, 1982, Bacon went down in a spill at Golden Gate Fields in Northern California. She was unconscious and bleeding from the head when she was taken to the hospital. Preliminary examinations indicated a serious head injury and she remained unconscious for eight days.

== Personal life ==
At the Detroit track Mary Steedman met jockey Johnny "Pug" Bacon. They married soon afterward. They competed together at Hazel Park, now defunct, in Michigan. In 1972 the track ruled that husbands and wives could not ride against each other. This combined with added marital difficulties Bacon divorced her husband in 1972. Pug Bacon died in a 1977 auto accident.

In March 1969, Bacon gave birth to a daughter, Suzie, only hours after riding horses in the practice gate. She returned to riding two weeks after giving birth.

She married jockey Jeff Anderson in 1981 and remained with him until her death.

=== Death ===
In pain from lingering riding injuries and cervical cancer, Bacon committed suicide at the age of 43 by self-inflicted gunshot in a motel in Fort Worth, Texas, on June 7, 1991, the eve of the Belmont Stakes. Discovered shortly after the gun was discharged, she died in the early morning hours of June 8 at John Peter Smith Hospital in Fort Worth.

Sixteen days later, her body was returned to New York and Belmont Park, where she had enjoyed much of her early success. Her cremated ashes were spread over the grave of Ruffian, perhaps the greatest female thoroughbred in history.

== See also ==
- List of jockeys
- Thoroughbred horse racing
