= Dolly Nazir =

Indian swimmer

Personal information
- Full name: Dolly Rustom Nazir
- Nationality: Indian
- Born: 1935 Bombay, British Raj
- Died: 2012 (aged 76–77) Bangalore, India

Sport
- Sport: Swimming

Dolly Rustom Nazir nee Byramji (1935–2012) was an Indian swimmer. She competed in two events at the 1952 Summer Olympics.

Nazir won Long Distance Open Sea Championships in Bombay in 1948 at the age of 13 and repeated the win the next year. In November 1950, she bettered the national record for 100 meters backstroke by more than three seconds while winning the All India Swimming Championships.

She married horse breeder and trainer Rashid Byramji in 1965 and moved to Bangalore.
