= Violet Smith =

American jockey

Violet Virginia "Pinkie" Smith was the first licensed female jockey in the Pacific Northwest and the sixth woman to be licensed as a jockey in the United States.

== History ==
Smith grew up in Auburn, Washington. Smith rode horses from the time she was a child. According to her mother, Smith was elated when she learned that "Penny Ann Early was going to break into the previously all-male occupation of riding." In 1969, Smith became the first female jockey to be licensed in the Northwest and the sixth woman in the country to obtain a jockey's license. She obtained an apprentice license at the Portland Meadows race track on April 22, 1969.

She was the "top girl rider" at the Pitt Park Meet in 1972. In 1983, Smith won the Arizona Breeders' Derby riding Arizona Brave. With over 6,000 starts and more than 600 wins, she last rode races in 1988.
