= Khatau Group =

Indian conglomerate

Khatau Group is one of the oldest Indian business conglomerates. It was founded in 1874 by Seth Khatau Makanji (also known as Makanji Khatau). The group was one of the leading Indian industrial houses by the mid twentieth century, with ventures in textiles, chemicals, shipping, cement, aviation, automobile, paints, and other industries.

== History ==
In addition to its flagship textile business, the Khatau Group helped pioneer India's industrial revolution by founding several leading companies in collaboration with other leaders of the time such as the Tatas and Walchand Hirachand. These included ACC Limited (1936), Hindustan Aeronautics Limited (HAL) (erstwhile Hindustan Aircraft Company (1940), and Premier Automobiles Limited (1944).

Two of Seth Khatau Makanji's grandsons, Dharamsey Khatau and Chandrakant Khatau (father of Sunit Khatau) led the Khatau Group in these diverse ventures. Dharamsey Khatau was a board member of each of these companies and a chairman of ACC in the 1950s. Dharamsey Khatau was an honorary member of the Textile Association of India, along with other doyens of Indian textile industry, including leaders of the Birla, Tata, Singhania, and Ambani industrial houses. Sunit Khatau, the then Chairman of the company, was assassinated in Mumbai in 1994 for a dispute about the sale of a mill.

The Khatau family's companies were separated and are now run independently by heirs and professional managers.
