= Pune Race Course =

Racecourse in Pune, India

Coordinates: 18.510133°N 73.893013°E

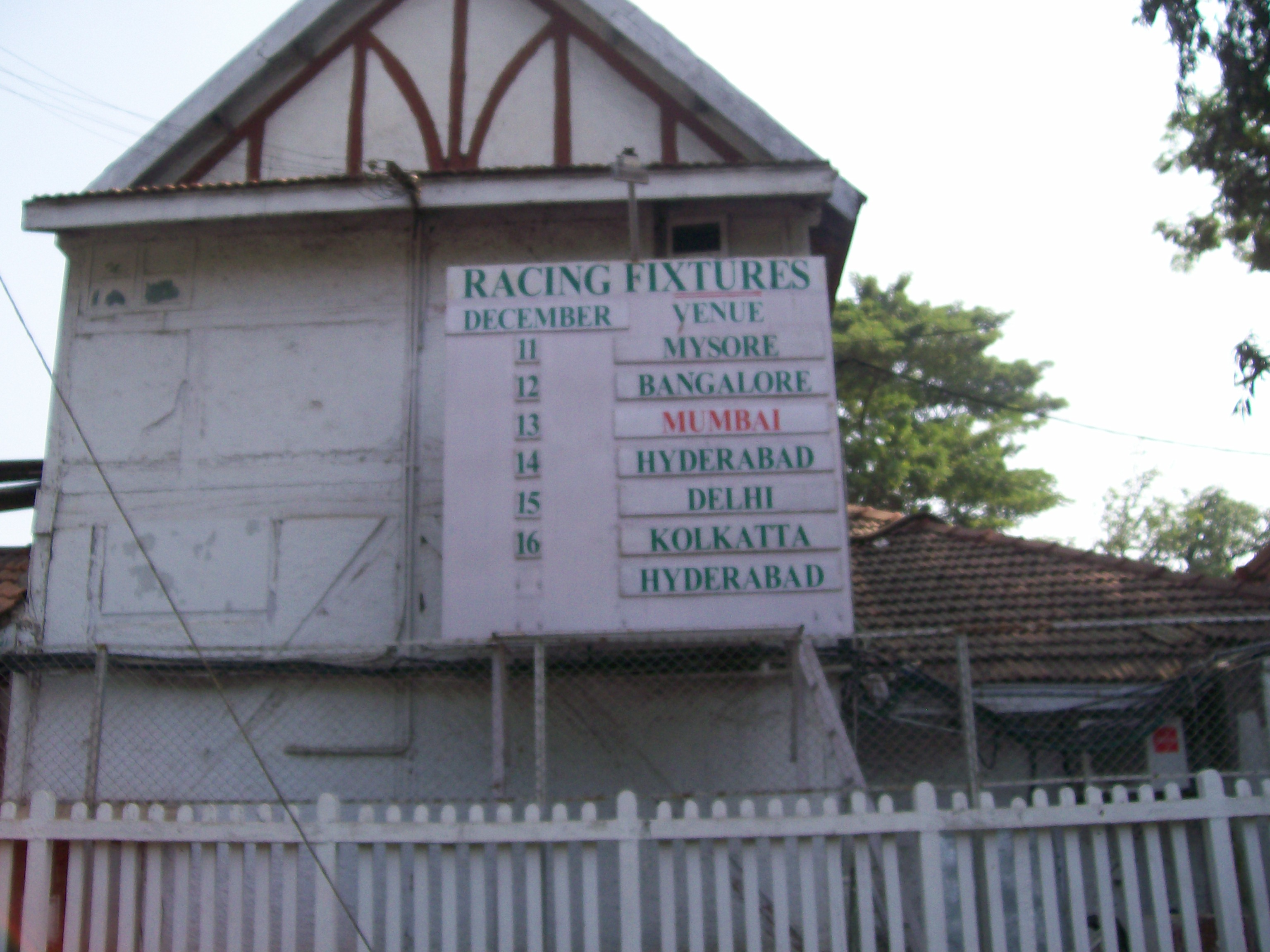
A board showing recent races at the Pune Race course

Pune Race Course is a racecourse located in Pune Cantonment, western India. It is located 5–6 km from downtown Pune and 12–13 km from Pune airport. Built in 1830, it covers 118.5 acres (48.0 ha). The land is controlled by the Indian Army.

Additional stabling for the horses is near Empress Garden, 1 kilometre (0.62 mi) from the course. The racing season runs from July to October and includes the Pune Derby, the RWITC Invitational, the Independence Cup and the Southern Command Cup. It is managed by Royal Western India Turf Club.

Recent derby winners include 2015 Bullrun ridden by P Kamlesh, 2016 Accolade ridden by P Trevor, and the 2017 Lady in Lace ridden by Suraj Narredu.
