= Aslam Kader =

Indian jockey (1962–2025)

Personal information
- Born: 9 December 1962 Mumbai, Maharashtra, India
- Died: 9 October 2025 (aged 62) Bengaluru, Karnataka, India
- Occupation: Jockey

Horse racing career
- Sport: Horse racing
- Career wins: 1717

Aslam Kader (9 December 1962 – 9 October 2025) was an Indian champion jockey.

Kader rode over 1700 winning horses, including 75 wins in classic horse races over his two-decade career. He won the Champion Jockeys title at every racing centre in India. He has won the title nine times at the Bangalore Centre and thrice in Mumbai. He holds the record for having ridden the maximum of numbers in one season at Mumbai, which stands at 77.

In September 2003, Kader fractured his collarbone in a fall at Pune race track. He later attempted to make a comeback but was unsuccessful, and had to retire. In 2005, he took part in an exhibition match-race, "Clash of Legends", in Mumbai. He rode Live Legend, and beat Pesi Shroff who was riding Sail Away.

Kader died from lung cancer on 9 October 2025, at the age of 62.
