= Chris J. Russell =

American jockey

Chris Russell
Personal information
- Born: December 3, 1980 (age 45) Cheverly, Maryland, U.S.
- Occupation: Jockey

Horse racing career
- Sport: Horse racing
- Career wins: 400+ (as of 2023)

Chris J. Russell (born December 3, 1980, in Cheverly, Maryland) is an American Thoroughbred horse racing jockey. He grew up with no horse racing background. He first got on a horse at the age of 18. He learned to ride in South Carolina breaking babies for Frank "Gorrie" Smith. After spending two years there he returned to California.

== Career ==
Russell obtained his jockey's license in December 2003 and began riding in California (where he won his first race at Santa Anita on February 23, 2005) before heading to the East Coast of the United States where he rode at Monmouth Park Racetrack in New Jersey for a short time before ending up at Laurel Park Racecourse (where he was involved in a November 2005 collision that sent both him and Rosie Napravnik to a hospital). In 2007, he returned to Southern California and the following year began riding at Los Alamitos Race Course. In June 2009 he left to ride the Northern California Fairs. After the 2010 racing fairs ended in October Russell returned to Los Alamitos Race Course. As of 2023 his career winnings total more than $5,500,000.

== Award ==
Russell won the top jockey award at the 2011 Humboldt County Fair meet in Ferndale, California after having taken second place at the previous year's meet.
