= Vadgaon Malegaon =

Vadgaon
- Village
- Location in Maharashtra, India
- Coordinates: 20.5927259°N 74.521366°E
- Country: India
- State: Maharashtra
- District: Nashik

Government
  - Type: Gram Panchayat
  - Sarpanch: Mahesh Shinde

Population (2011)
  - Total: 4,112

Languages
  - Official: Ahirani
- Time zone: UTC+5:30 (IST)
- Postal Index Number: 423105
- Vehicle registration: MH 41

Vadgaon is a census town in Nashik district in the Indian state of Maharashtra.

== Geography ==
It is located 119 kilometres (74 mi) east from District headquarters Nashik. 4 kilometres (2.5 mi) from Malegaon. 289 kilometres (180 mi) from state capital Mumbai. Nilgawan (2 km), Camp (3 km), Dnyane (3 km), Osiya Nagar (5 km), Lendane (5 km) are the nearby villages.

Vadgaon is surrounded by Baglan Taluka towards west, Nandgaon Taluka towards South, Deola Taluka towards west, Chandwad Taluka towards south.

Malegaon, Satana, and Manmad are nearby cities.

Vadgaon has a sub village Vaitagwadi, Dadawadi.

== Demographics ==
As of 2011 India census, Vadgaon had a population of 4,112. Males constitute 51.24% of the population and females 48.76%. Vadgaon has an average literacy rate of 75%, higher than the national average of 74.04%: Male literacy is 80%, and female literacy is 69%. In Vadgaon, 13% of the population is under 6 years of age.

== Education ==
The education system supports Marathi and English learning. Two schools offer primary and secondary education. For higher education students go to Malegaon. The two schools in Vadgaon are ZP School and Mokshayani Vidyalaya.

== Culture ==
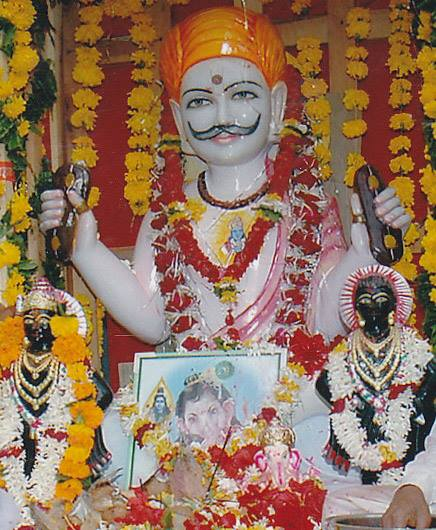
सावता महाराज मूर्ती

Well-known temples include Panch Mukhi Mahadev, Hanuman Mandir, Renuka Mata Mandir, and Savata Maharaj.
