= Y. S. Srinath =

Indian jockey (born 1976)

Srinath Yenangur Srinath (born 13 July 1976) is a champion jockey from Bangalore who has ridden over 1250 winners, including 94 graded races. He was the first Indian Jockey to win more than 25 races outside of India and has won many important classics.

== Career ==
Srinath started riding at the age of 12 in amateur races, following the footsteps of his father, who was beside an amateur rider a horse owner as well. At the age of 18, he started riding as a professional and soon became one of India's most talented riders.

Some of Srinath's achievements include:

- Between 2016 and 2020, Srinath won 35 group races in centres all over India (Mumbai, Pune, Calcutta, Hyderabad, Bangalore, Mysore).
- On 1 March 2020 and 3 March 2019, Srinath made a remarkable achievement by winning he Indian Invitation Cup on Adjudicate twice in a row, at different centres and with breaking track records on both occasions.
- Srinath was invited to ride at the annual International Jockeys Meet in Mauritius in November 2019, where his winner was adjudged as one of the top 5 rides of the weekend.
- Another achievement was winning the Indian Invitation Cup at three consecutive meetings at the Hyderabad Race Club (2009, 2014 and 2019), which was the first time in history that this happened.
- Of course, his Indian Derby winner on Alaindair in 2013, and winning with Autonomy (Invitation Cup) and Pronto Pronto (Bangalore Derby), winning four Hyderabad monsoon Derby’s are some of his proud achievements.
- His most fond memories are of being saddle partner of Oasis Star that was owned by Mr. Shapoor Mistry, which brought him to race in Dubai at the inaugural racing carnival at the Meydan in 2010.
- Other highlights in his early career are winning his first big race in Bangalore with Estocade in 1997 (Super Mile Cup), his first Bangalore Derby winner with Allaire in 2000. Winning his first Indian St Leger in Bombay with Warsaw Pact in 2002.), and a surprising and thrilling win on Riyasat in the Indian Oaks 2009.

== Notable races ==
- The Indian Turf Invitation Cup 2020 in Mysore
- The Invitation Cup in 2009, 2014 and 2019 thrice in Hyderabad
- The McDowell's Indian Derby at Royal Western India Turf Club Ltd. (RWITC) in 2014
- The Bangalore Derby in 2000 and 2011
- The McDowell Indian St Leger Grade 1 at Royal Western India Turf Club Ltd. (RWITC) in 2002, 2005, 2010 & 2017
- The Indian Oaks Grade 1 at Royal Western India Turf Club Ltd. (RWITC) in 2009
- The Deccan Derby Grade 1 at Hyderabad Race Club (HRC) in 2007, 2008, 2016 and 2017
- The Super Mile Cup Grade 1 in 1997 and 2011
- The Sprinters Cup Grade 1 in 2003, 2005, 2008 and 2009.

== International experience ==
Year	Place	Details
2019	Mauritius	International Jockeys Weekend
2010	Meydan, Dubai	Racing Carnival
2009	Doha, Qatar	Arab Horse Racing
2007	Macau, China	36 rides, 3 wins
2003	Macau, China	30 rides, 5 wins
2000	Macau, China	156 rides, 28 wins
1996	Manila, Philippines	The International Jockey’s meet
