= Pesi Shroff =

Indian jockey (born 1965)

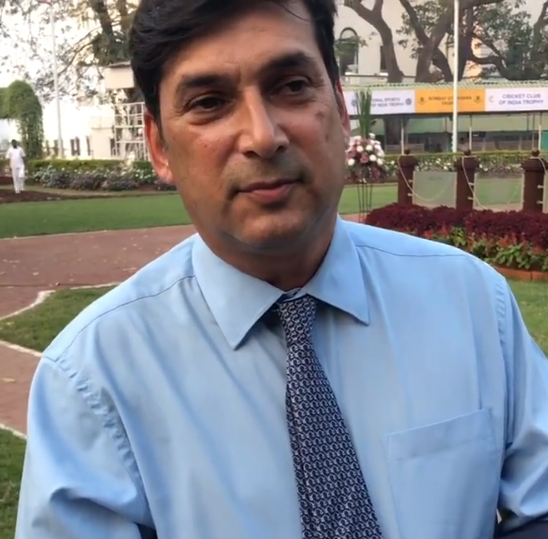

Personal information
- Born: 1965 (age 60–61) Mumbai, India
- Occupations: Jockey, Horse trainer

Horse racing career
- Sport: Horse racing
- Updated on 10 May 2008

Pesi Shroff (born 1965) is a former Indian champion jockey. He has ridden 5,614 races and won 1,751 of them, including 106 classic races and 29 Derbys. Born to a Parsi family, he began his career at 16 years old when he was licensed to ride by the Royal Western India Turf Club in Mumbai in 1981. He won his first race on My Squaw.

Pesi had a long association with Indian liquor baron Vijay Mallya having been on retainer for him for several years. Apart from Mallya, he has also ridden for leading owners of the Indian turf like M.A.M. Ramaswamy, Deepak Khaitan, and Khushroo Dhunjibhoy .

To date, he is the only jockey to have piloted eight Derby winners at the Mahalaxmi Racecourse, Mumbai and has ridden a classic winner in each of the five major racing centres of India.

On 31 October 2004, he retired from the profession to become a trainer.

Pesi is married to childhood sweetheart Tina (sister of Karl Umrigar) with whom they have had two children, Yohann and Anya. He also likes to play golf and is a cricket fan.

== Career wins as a jockey ==
Wins
Year	Race	Horse
1984	Indian Derby	Enterprising
1985	Indian Derby	Revelation
1989	Indian Derby	Exhilaration
1990	Indian Derby	Desert Warrior
1991	Indian Derby	Starfire Girl
1994	Indian Derby	Little Over
2001	Indian Derby	Storm Again
2004	Indian Derby	Psychic Flame
1985	Indian Turf Invitation	Revelation
1986	Indian Turf Invitation	Amorous Knight
1989	Indian Turf Invitation	Exhilaration
1990	Indian Turf Invitation	Desert Warrior
1992	Indian Turf Invitation	Bugs Bunny
1993	Indian Turf Invitation	Adler
2001	Indian Turf Invitation	Storm Again
