= Sunit Khatau =

Indian billionaire industrialist

Sunit Khatau was an Indian billionaire industrialist who served as chairman and managing director of the Khatau Group. The Group has ventures in textiles, chemicals, shipping, cement, aviation, automobile, real estate and other industries. He was assassinated in Mumbai on 7 May 1994 by gangster Amar Naik for matters related to a dispute about a land sale. He left his legacy to his 3 daughters; Aparna, Neesha and Reena Khatau.

In addition to his industrial activity, Khatau was the largest owner of racehorses in India. His horses won prestigious races, including the 1981 Indian Derby, the Invitation Cup, the Bangalore Derby, and the Calcutta Derby.
