= Karl Umrigar =

Indian jockey (1960–1979)

- Occupation: Jockey
- Born: 4 October 1960
- Died: 3 May 1979 (aged 18)

Karl Umrigar (4 October 1960 – 3 May 1979), born to a Parsi family, was a champion Indian jockey in the 1970s. Umrigar became a famous Indian jockey at the age of 17.

In the 1978-79 Mahalaxmi racing season, Umrigar rode 144 mounts with 54 winners, 33 seconds, 22 thirds and 17 fourths, only 18 of his rides failing to finish in the frame.

He died in a tragic accident on the racetrack when the horse, Vasudha, threw him off her back. He slipped into coma at the Breach Candy hospital and died on 3 May 1979. His family sponsors a Karl Umrigar Trophy every year in his memory.
