= Suraj Narredu =

Indian jockey (born 1985)

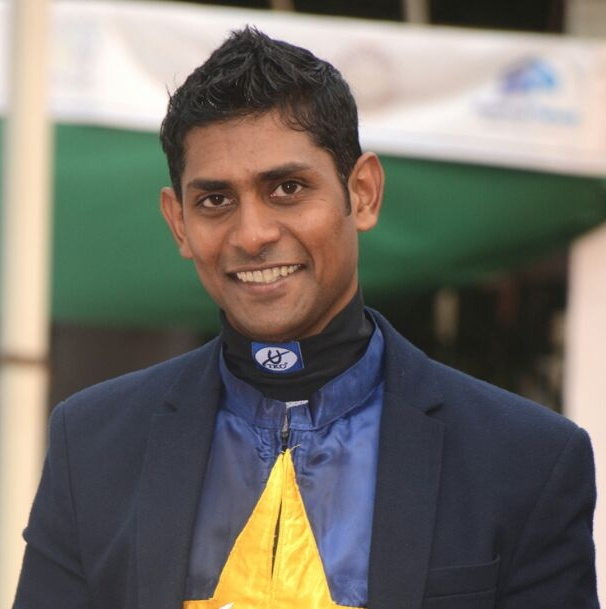

Personal information
- Citizenship: India
- Born: 7 February 1985 (age 41) Bangalore

Sport
- Country: India
- Sport: Horse racing
- Updated on 15 June 2017

Suraj Narredu (born 7 February 1985) is an Indian flat racing jockey. Throughout his career, he has recorded over 2,400 wins, including 110 Indian Classic victories and over 250 Group races.

== Career achievements ==
Over the course of his career, Suraj Narredu has secured more than 2400 wins, including 110 Indian Classic victories and over 250 Group races. His 100th Classic win was with Long Lease in the Calcutta Oaks.

== International career ==
Driven by a desire to challenge himself in diverse racing environments, Narredu has ridden and won races across the globe. He has held jockey licenses in Australia, France, Dubai and Macau.

== Career ==
Classic Wins
Year	Race	Horse
2003	Vijay Textiles Golconda 2000 Guineas (Gr III)	Coral Gables
2004	Golconda Oaks (Gr III)	Annapolis
2005	Deccan Bookmakers Association Fillies Trial St	Da Vinci Rose
2005	Calcutta Fillies Trial St	Sanskara
2005	K R O A Mysore 1000 Guineas (Gr III)	Bratz
2005	Calcutta Derby Trial St	Sanskara
2005	Golconda 1000 Guineas (Gr II)	Bratz
2005	Poonawalla Mysore Derby (Gr I)	Psychic Strength
2006	Poonawalla Mysore Derby (Gr I)	Super Speed
2007	Golconda 1000 Guineas (Gr II)	Ruby Queen
2008	Golconda Oaks (Gr II)	Ruby Queen
2008	Deccan Bookmakers Association Colts Trial St	Succeeding Star
2008	Calcutta Fillies Trial St 2008	Safari
2009	Calcutta 1000 Guineas 08-09 Gr III	Safari
2009	Calcutta Colts Trial St 2009	Credit Squeeze
2009	Fernhill's Palace Bangalore 1000 Guineas Gr II	You're So Beautiful
2009	Harvins Bangalore 2000 Guineas Gr II	Sprint Star
2010	Vijay Textiles Golconda Derby Stakes 2010 Gr I	Arabian Prince
2010	Vandrevala Foundation Indian Turf Invitation Cup (Gr I)	Becket
2010	HDIL Colts Trial St (Gr I)	Sun Kingdom
2010	HDIL Bangalore 2000 Guineas (Gr II)	Sun Kingdom
2011	Arlington Heights (Gr III)	Invisible Star
2011	Nanoli Stud Pune Derby (Gr I)	Hills and Stars
2011	Nanoli Stud Pune Derby (Gr I)	Hills and Stars
2012	Calcutta Fillies Trial St	Silverina
2012	Mysore 2000 Guineas (Gr III)	Super Storm
2012	Abaran Bangalore 2000 Guineas (Gr II)	Wind Stream
2014	Deccan Bookmakers Golconda Derby Stakes (Gr I)	Roses in Bloom
2014	Colts Championship St (Gr I)	Be Safe
2014	Kingfisher Derby Bangalore (Gr I)	Be Safe
2014	Deccan Bookmakers Fillies Championship (Gr III)	Godspeed
2014	Nanoli Stud Pune Derby (Gr I)	Quasar
2014	Calcutta 2000 Guineas (Gr II)	Quasar
2014	New Hope Indian 1000 Guineas (Gr I)	Godspeed
2014	ABV Nucleus 2000 Guineas (Gr I)	Be Safe
2015	Eveready Calcutta Derby St (Gr I)	Quasar
2015	Deccan Bookmakers Golconda Derby Stakes (Gr I)	Quasar
2015	McDowell Signature Indian Derby (Gr I)	Be Safe
2015	Deccan Colts Championship (Gr III)	Desert God
2015	Golconda 1000 Guineas (Gr II)	Intelligence
2016	Calcutta Fillies Trial St	Dysomnia
2016	Calcutta Monsoon Derby (Gr II)	Whomakestherules
2016	Calcutta 1000 Guineas (Gr III)	Silver Beauty
2016	Calcutta 2000 Guineas (Gr II)	Whomakestherules
2016	Bangalore 2000 Guineas (Gr II)	Battalion
2016	Calcutta Oaks (Gr III)	Silver Beauty
2016	South India 1000 Guineas (Gr III)	Aika Aika Aika
2017	Calcutta Fillies Trial Stakes	Windsor Forest
2017	Jayachamraja Wadiyar Golf Club Mysore 2000 Guineas (Gr II)	Castlebridge
2017	Kingfisher Ultra Pune Derby (Gr I)	Lady in Lace
2017	Mysore Derby (Gr I)	Castlebridge
2017	Golconda St Leger (Gr II)	Salazaar
2017	Golconda 1000 Guineas (Gr II)	Lady in Lace
2017	Spartan Poker Indian 1000 Guineas (Gr I)	Lady in Lace
2017	South India 2000 Guineas (Gr I)	Tutankhamun
2018	Golconda Oaks (Gr II)	Nanhipari
2018	Calcutta Derby St (Gr I)	Aggregated
2018	Deccan Bookmakers Fillies Championship St (Gr III)	Realmsoffantasy
2018	Deccan Bookmakers Colts Championship St (Gr III)	Star Superior
2018	Deccan Derby (Gr I)	Star Superior
2018	Calcutta Oaks (Gr II)	Oriana
2019	Kingfisher Ultra Indian Derby (Gr I)	Star Superior
2019	Calcutta St Leger (Gr III)	Shivansh
2019	Raghulal Mysore 1000 Guineas (Gr III)	Cosmic Ray
2019	Jayachamraja Wadiyar Golf Club Mysore 2000 Guineas (Gr III)	Northern Alliance
2019	Calcutta 1000 Guineas (Gr III)	Izzy
2019	The Golconda 1000 Guineas (Gr.2)	Paso Robles
2019	Bangalore 2000 Guineas (Gr.2)	War Hammer
2020	The Golconda Oaks (Gr.2)	Paso Robles
2020	The South India Derby Stakes (Gr.1)	Sir Supremo
2020	The Indian Champion Cup (Gr.1)	Star Superior
2020	Bangalore Derby (Gr.1)	War Hammer
2020	The Kingfisher Ultra Indian Derby (Gr.1)	War Hammer
2020	The South India 1000 Guineas (Gr.2)	Born Queen
2020	Calcutta 2000 Guineas (Gr.2)	Black Pearl
2020	Banglore St. Leger (Gr.2)	Cosmos
2020	Bangalore 2000 Guineas (Gr.2)	Lagarde
2021	The South India St. Leger (Gr.2)	Cosmos
2021	The South India Oaks (Gr.2)	Born Queen
2021	The Indian 2000 Guineas (Gr.1)	Lagarde
2021	The South India Derby Stakes (Gr.1)	Born Queen
2021	Calcutta Derby Stakes (Gr.1)	Black Pearl
2021	The HRC Golconda 2000 Guineas (Gr.2)	Ashwa Bravo
2021	The Indian Champion Cup (Gr.1)	Psychic Force
2021	The Kingfisher Ultra Indian Derby (Gr.1)	Immortality
