= Mahalaxmi Racecourse =

Horse racing track in Mumbai, India

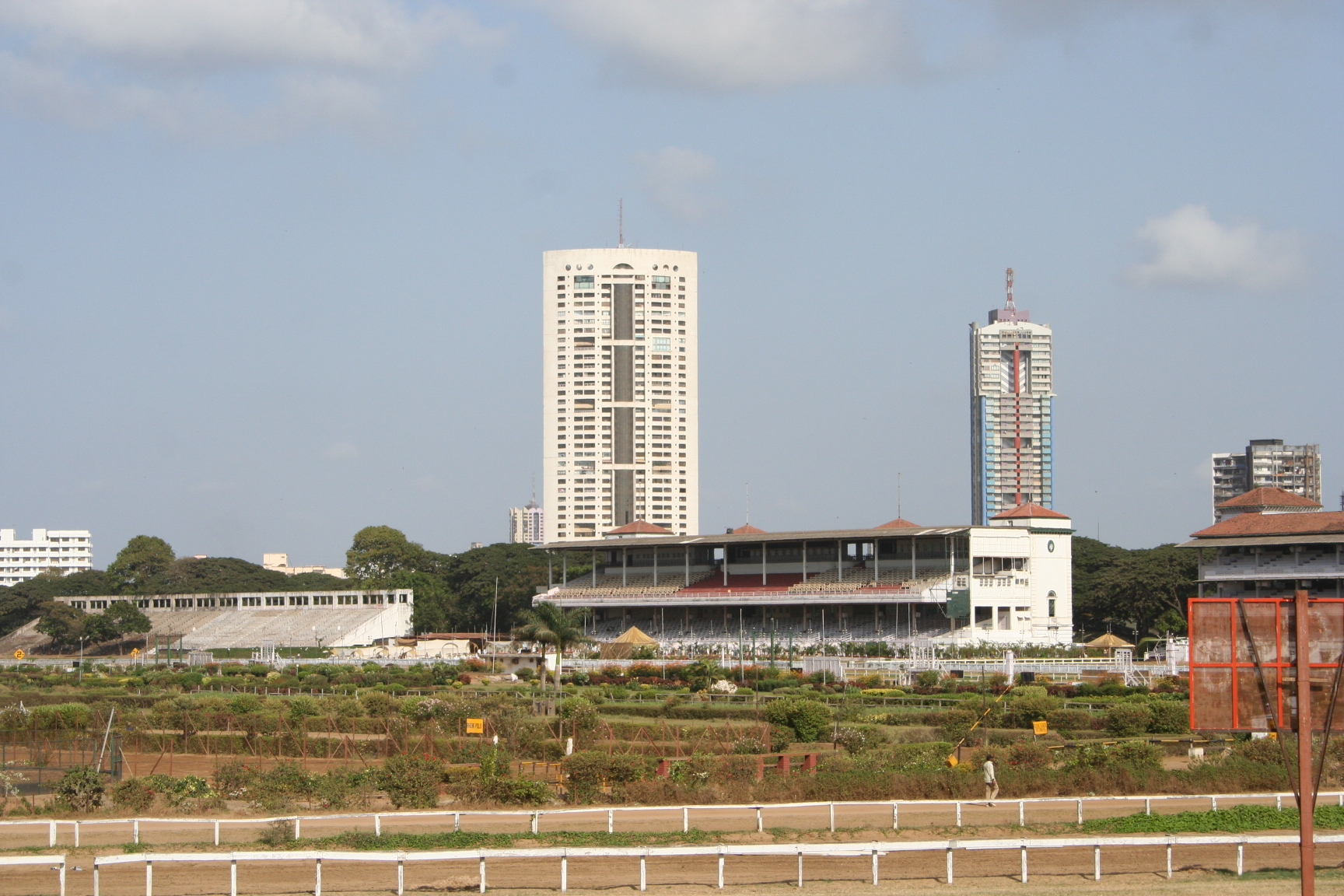
- Interactive map of Mahalaxmi Racecourse
- Location: Mahalaxmi, Mumbai, Maharashtra, India
- Coordinates: 18.984°N 72.82°E
- Owned by: Government of Maharashtra
- Operated by: Royal Western India Turf Club
- Date opened: 1883
- Notable races: McDowell's Indian Derby

The Mahalaxmi Racecourse is a horse racing track in Mahalaxmi neighbourhood of Mumbai. The track is oval shaped with 2,400 metres (7,900 ft) straight chute, spread over approximately 225 acres (0.91 km^{2}; 0.352 sq mi) of open land in the heart of Mumbai city. It was created out of a marshy land known as Mahalakshmi Flats. It was built in 1883 and the stands were modelled on the Randwick Racecourse in Sydney in 1922 by Sydney architect and racing administrator Theodore John Marks. It is spread over land facing the sea.

The racecourse was originally donated by Sir Cusrow N Wadia and today it is on lease from the Municipal Corporation of Greater Mumbai (MCGM) to Royal Western India Turf Club which runs the racecourse. The Grandstand, off the course, is a designated heritage structure. The racecourse is the only helipad open for civilian use in South Mumbai.

== Overview ==
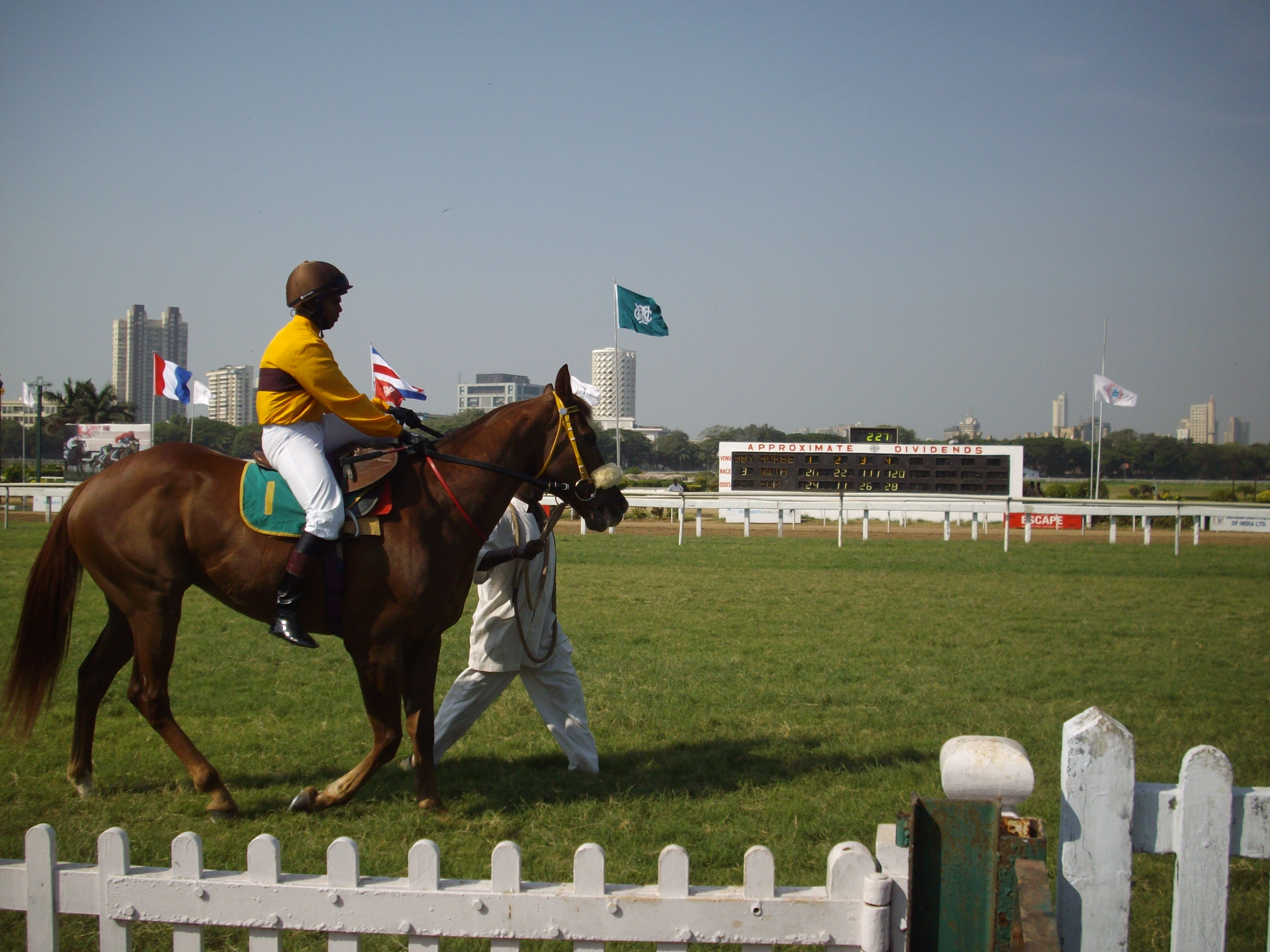
Jockey B. Prakash on Fractious Fav Secret Memory.

The horse racing season starts in mid-November and ends in the last week of April. On the first Sunday in February, the Indian Derby is conducted annually and is attended by many of the city's glitterati. Between 1984 and 2022, the Derby was sponsored by liquor baron Vijay Mallya's UB Group under the name of flagship company McDowells Co. Ltd. as The McDowell's Indian Derby.

The common Mumbaikar has access to the racecourse in the mornings and evenings during specified timings for exercising, walking or jogging in the inner lane of the main horse race track. The racecourse has also transformed many common Mumbaikars to Marathoners. Yoga sessions akin to tai chi are conducted in the garden situated within the race-track during the common permissible timings, akin to "Happy Valley Racecourse" in Hong Kong. Lessons for horse-riding are also provided by Amateurs Riders Club. In the evenings, dogs are also allowed to be walked, but one has to check the permissibility. On weekends it is common to find Aero-Modelling hobbyists flying planes on the polo ground, performing aerial acrobats with motorised radio-controlled planes during non-racing days. The ground is also used as a heli-pad. Lately, they have even started with providing newspapers in the morning to the joggers.

== 99-year lease debate ==
The land on which the racetrack sits was leased to the Royal Western India Turf Club for 99 years, ended on 31 May 2013.

Some people feel the land should be converted into a public park. Others are sceptical about the park plan and feel it will become full of slums and encroachments.

The state government favours leasing out the racecourse for another 30 years.

It is currently leased for Rs 56 lakh/year. The new rates will be Rs 42 crore/year and increase every 5 years.

=== Arguments for maintaining the racecourse ===
- It currently employs 5000 people.
- The state government collects Rs. 50 crore/year in betting tax from the 43 race days.
- The Turf club maintains entire land including the walking and jogging track at no cost to the BMC or state government.
- The lawns are rented out for weddings and other outdoor events.
