= Royal Western India Turf Club =

Horse racing club in India

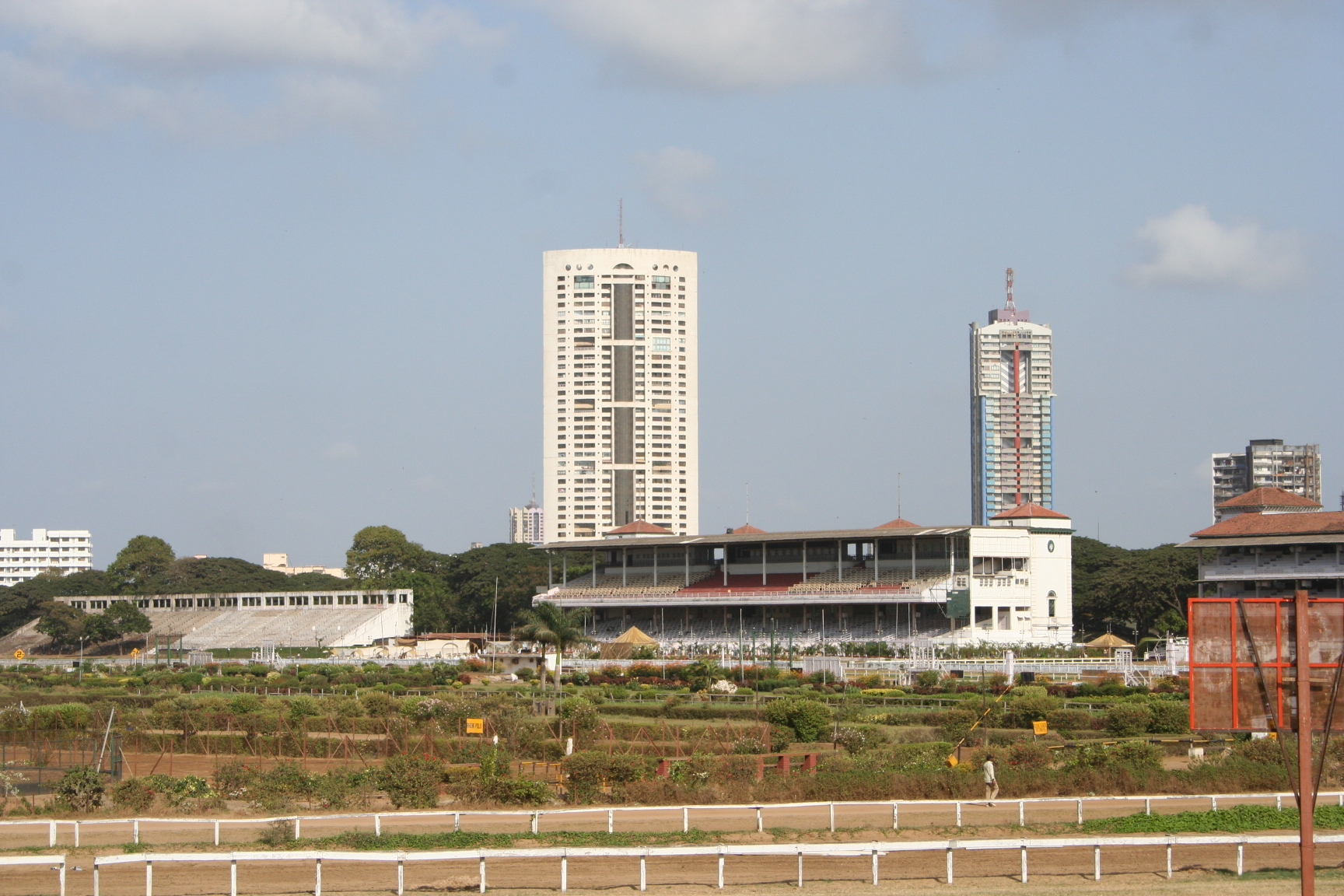
Mahalaxmi Racecourse in Mumbai, presently run by RWITC.

Royal Western India Turf Club Ltd. (RWITC) is an exclusive Indian sports club for horse racing, established in 1800. Which runs the Mahalaxmi Racecourse in Mumbai and the Pune Race Course.

== History ==
The Royal Western India Turf Club has a history spanning just over two centuries. It conducts racing at Mumbai's Mahalaxmi Racecourse (from November to April), including the Indian Derby in February and Pune (from July to October), while Delhi races under its Rules.

Its first meeting was held 10–11 January 1798, with two plates run in heats. Breakfast was served on the high grounds opposite Colonel Jones’ house and Captain G. Hall saluted the last race with fifteen guns.

Captain G. Hall, Sir Charles Forbes, A. Campbell, P. Hadow and others formed the Bombay Turf Club in 1802 and they acquired land in Byculla to conduct racing; the balcony of the clubhouse was used as a private stand for the Members. Shortly thereafter the name was changed to the Western India Turf Club.

For the major part of the nineteenth century, racing continued to be held at Byculla until in 1883 the venue was shifted to Mahalakshmi on land made available by Sir C N Wadia. The race course was originally built under the direction and supervision of Major J E Hughes.

During this time Calcutta held the upper hand in Indian racing, but as the twentieth century dawned, Bombay became the "City of Gold."

The first running of the Eclipse Stakes of India in 1923 gave Bombay a race to rival the Viceroy's Cup. New stands were commissioned in 1925 and then in 1935, King George V bestowed the privilege of prefixing the club's name with "Royal." The club also featured other royal dignitaries such as the Queen of the United Kingdom, the Shah of Iran, and the King of Saudi Arabia. In 1943 the first Indian Classics were run and when 21 years later the Indian Turf Invitation Cup came into being, Mahalakshmi was the chosen venue for its first running.

Pune, 3 hours drive south-east of Bombay, the other centre at which the Royal Western India Turf Club conducts its racing is quite different. It is a monsoon track and is where the main Club House (with accommodation and ballroom) is. The track is tighter and has a shorter run-in, with the variable underfoot conditions making for some unexpected results. Many horses from Calcutta traditionally come over to Pune for their "summer spelling" and get ready for the big Cup Races on their home turf in the winter.

As of 30 June 2010 the club had 7566 members. As of 15 July 2010 the club had 600 owners, 46 licensed trainers, and 80 Jockeys. The club typically houses around 1400 horses in training at Mumbai's Mahalaxmi Racecourse.

In June 2019, the club called for reduction of betting taxes and involvement of celebrities in its activities to attract more youngsters to the sport of horse racing. According to the existing tax regime, for every 100 rupees that is wagered, 28 rupees goes to the government as Goods and Services Tax (India).

== Membership ==
The club's membership stands at about 7,850 with the "club" class (the only category allowed to vote) members at 1,675.

Broadly speaking, the categories of membership are: Life, Club, Stand and Invitee. Interviews are taken by club authorities before membership is approved. Being prominent personality or a politician does not give you direct pass to membership. Existing members can object and reject club membership during the interview stage.

== Facilities ==
- Pune: Accommodation of 25 rooms & 4 cottages, Ballroom with 300 capacity, Bar, Victoria Room and Lawn.
- Bombay: Mini Clubhouse (i.e. restaurant), Card Room, Bar Lounge, Health Club and 2 walking tracks. There are plans to build accommodation, tennis courts and swimming pool.

== See also ==
- Andrew Geddis
