= English Triple Crown race winners =

List of winners of English horseraces

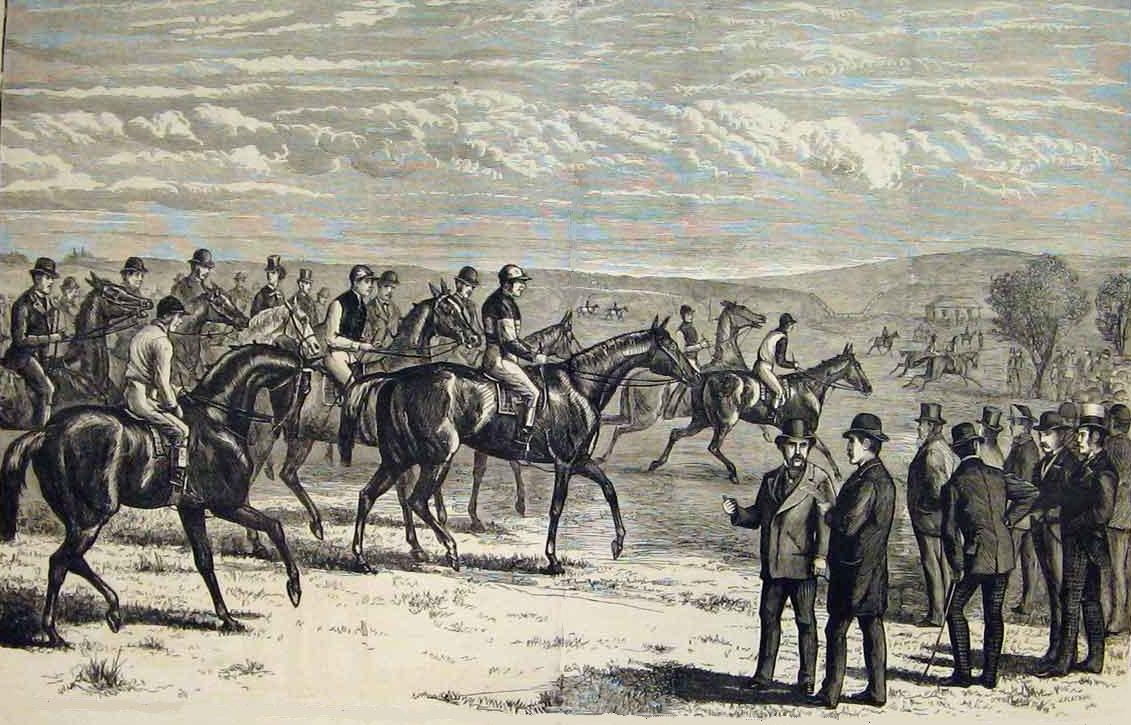
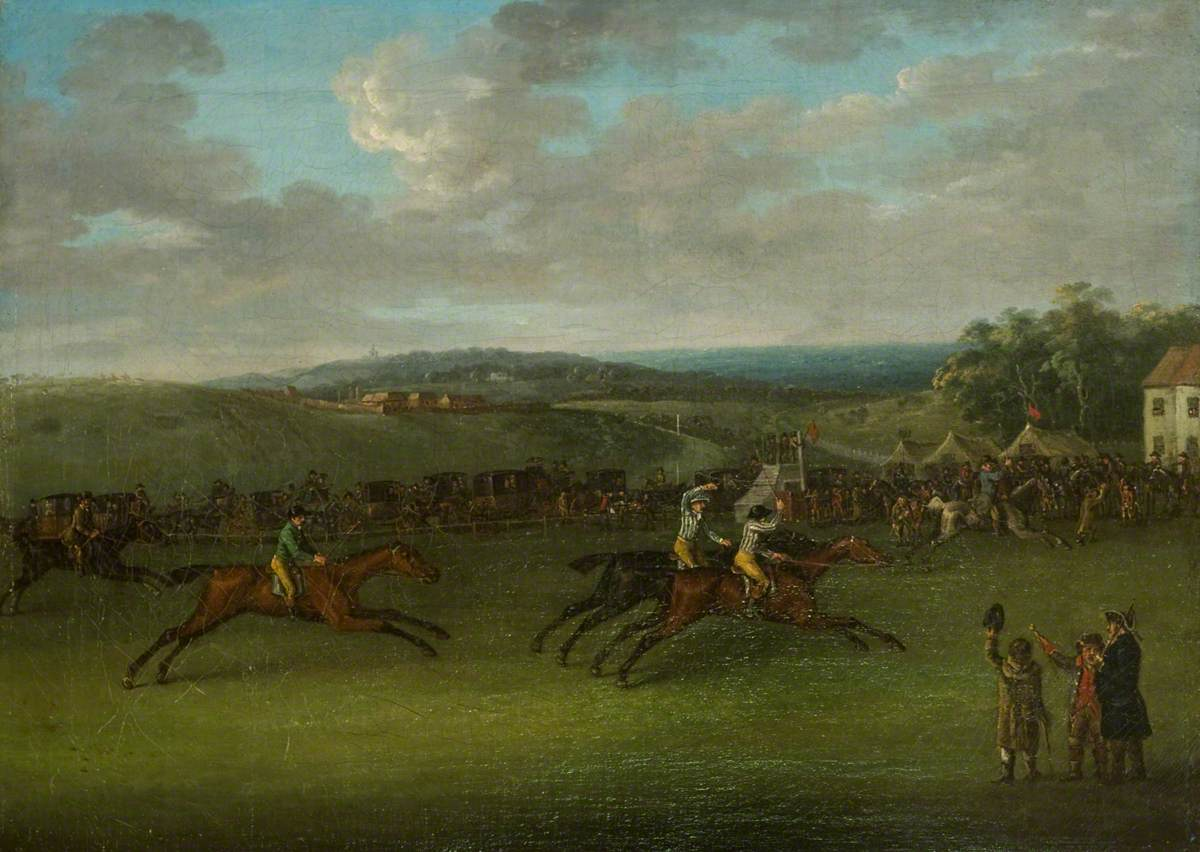
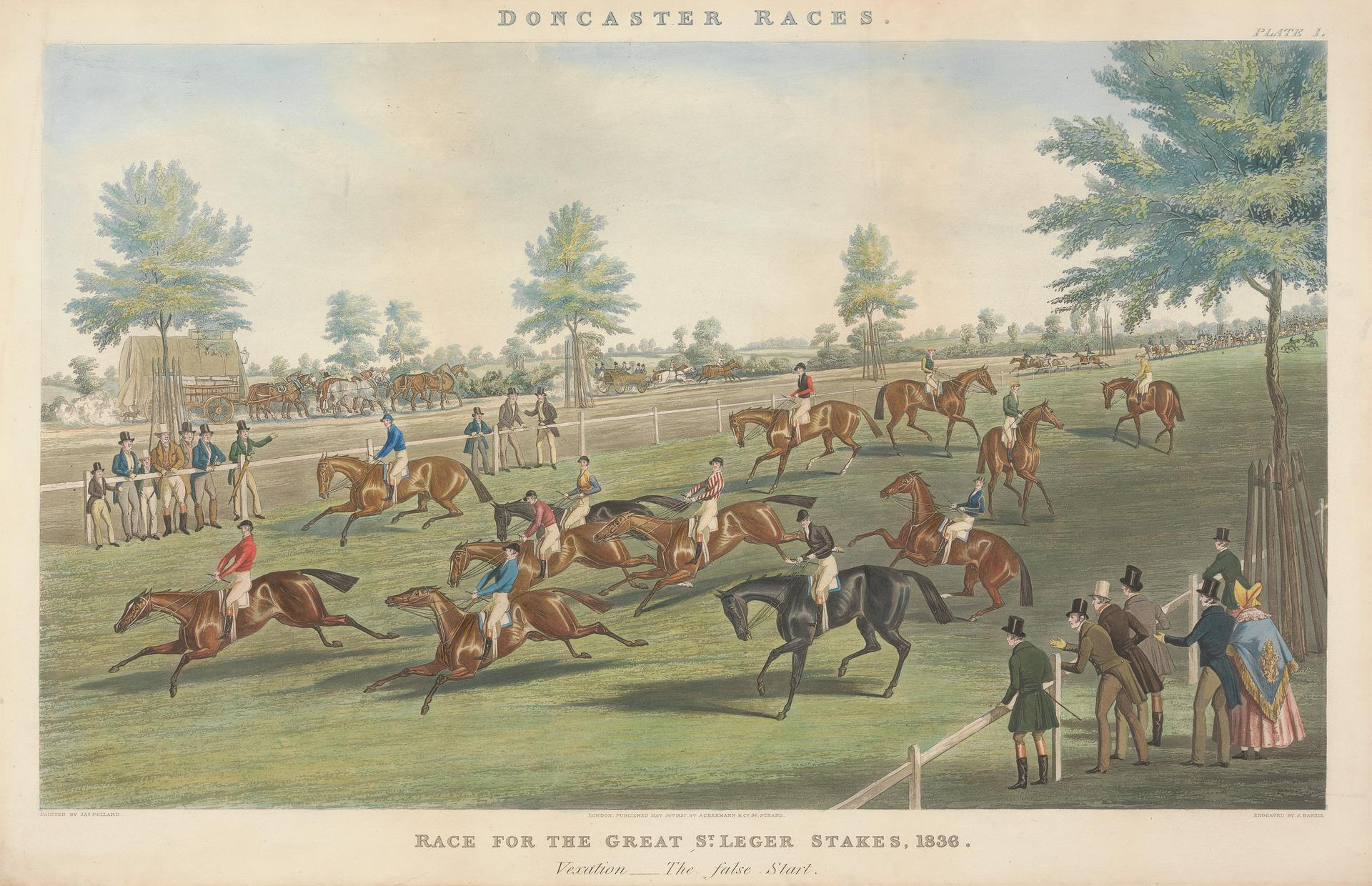
The three races of the English Triple Crown

In British horseracing, the Triple Crown is awarded to any horse that successfully wins three British Classic races: the 2000 Guineas Stakes, the Derby, and the St Leger Stakes. Each race is limited to three-year-old horses, meaning every horse only has one attempt at completing the Crown. Fifteen horses have won all three legs, with West Australian the first in 1853 and Nijinsky the most recent horse to achieve the feat in 1970. 47 additional horses have won two of the Crown's legs, either falling short in the third race or not entering it. Since 2025, completing the Crown has come with a prize of £2,000,000.

The three races have occasionally changed in location or length, with the largest overhaul occurring during the First World War, where substitute races for the Derby and St. Leger stakes were held at Newmarket, Suffolk, after all racing events outside of the town were cancelled. The atypical nature of these races resulted in three horses, Pommern, Gay Crusader and Gainsborough, winning all three legs between 1915 and 1918, This has led to some older retrospectives not considering the three horses as Triple Crown winners. However the trio were all reported as winners of the Triple Crown in contemporary reports, as well as in modern sources, including The Independent, The Daily Telegraph, and the British Racing Hall of Fame.

While most of the winning horses have been colts, there have been many fillies that have won legs of the Triple Crown as well, although no filly has ever won all three legs. Seven fillies have won the 2000 Guineas Stakes, seven have won the Derby, and 41 have won the St Leger Stakes. The only year in which a filly won each of the individual Triple Crown races was 1882.

== Winners ==
Key for full list of race winners
†	Denotes winners of the Triple Crown
⁑	Denotes winners of the 2000 Guineas Stakes and Epsom Derby that raced in the St Leger Stakes and lost (Note: Source in the relevant St Leger Stakes's row shows whether the winning horse of the previous two legs ran in that year's race.)
※	Denotes winners of the 2000 Guineas Stakes and Epsom Derby that did not race in the St Leger Stakes
#	Denotes winners of the other two combinations of 2 out of the 3 Triple Crown races
♥	Denotes a filly

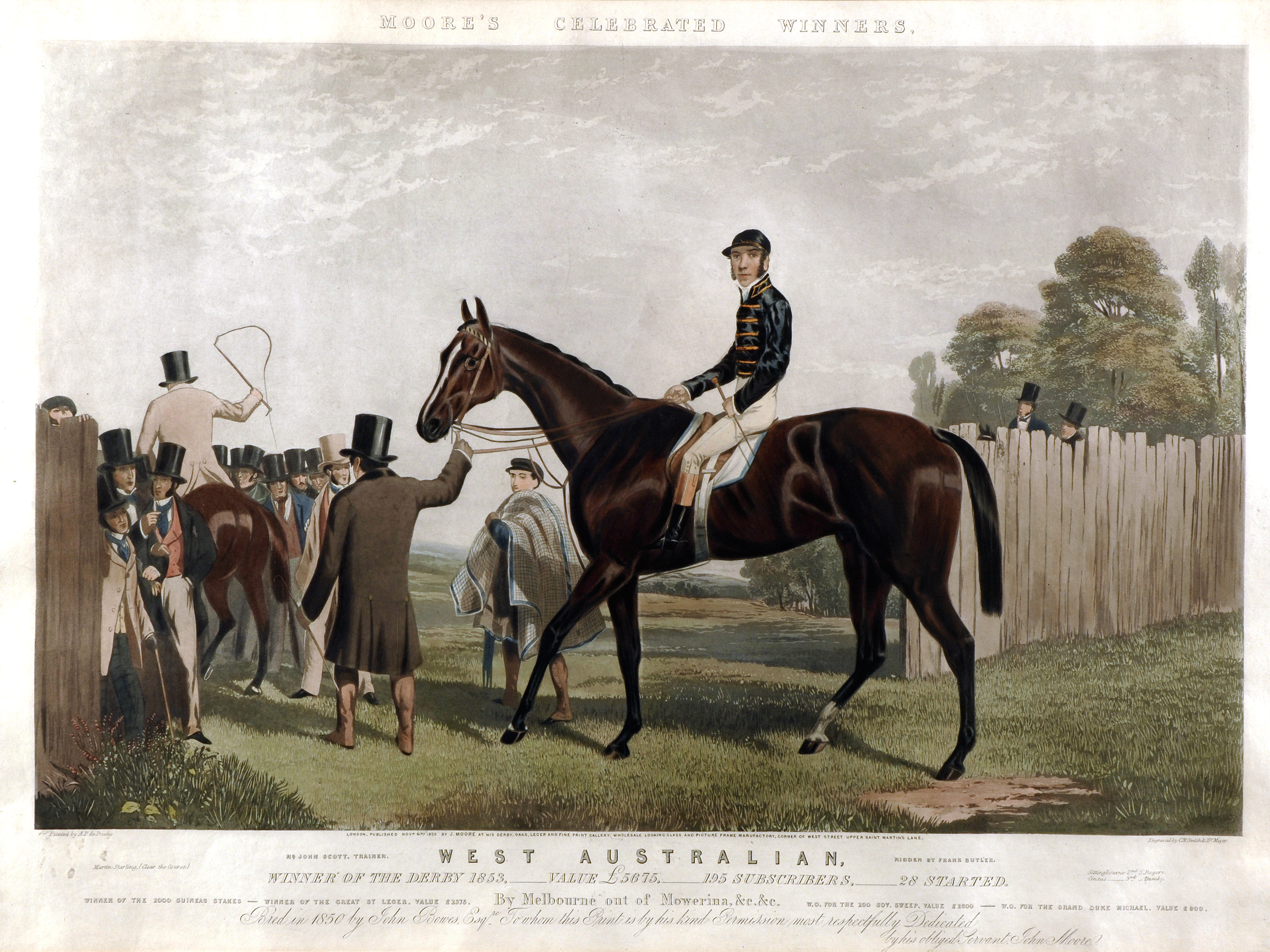
West Australian, the first English Triple Crown winner (1853)

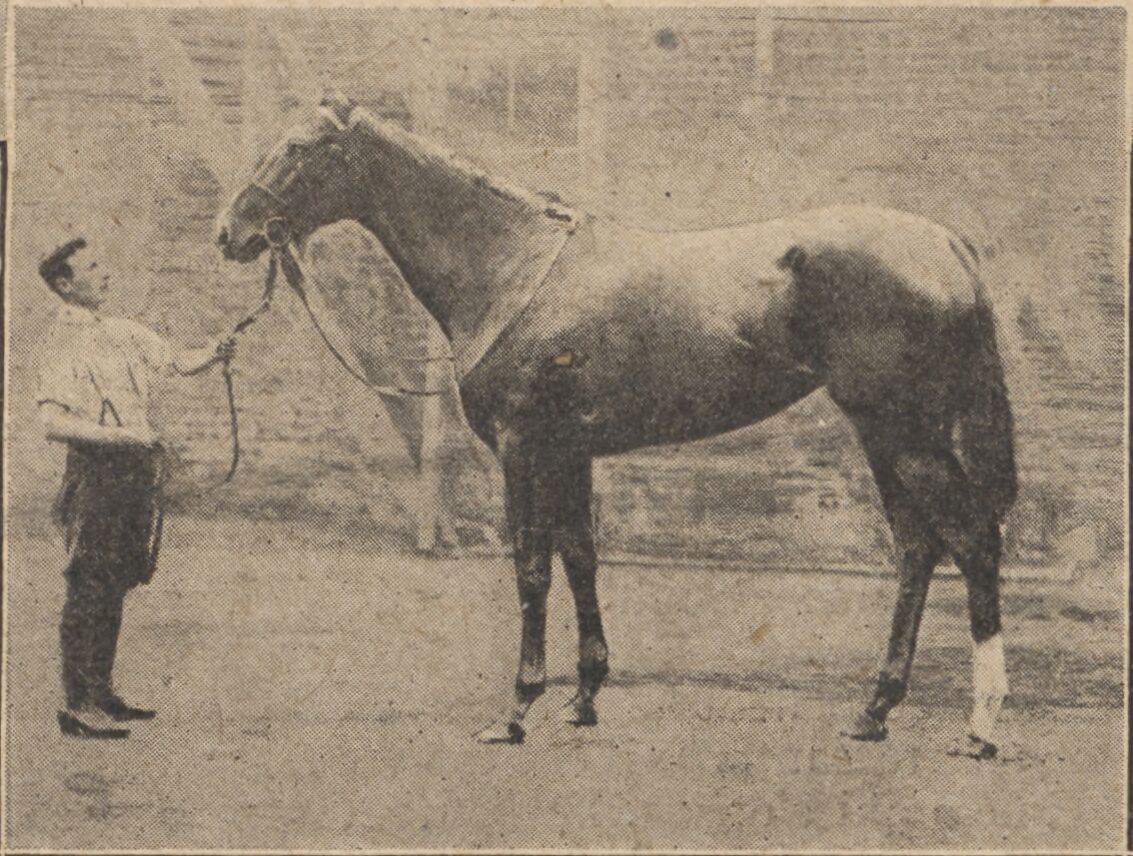
Gay Crusader, one of the three "wartime" Triple Crown winners (1915)

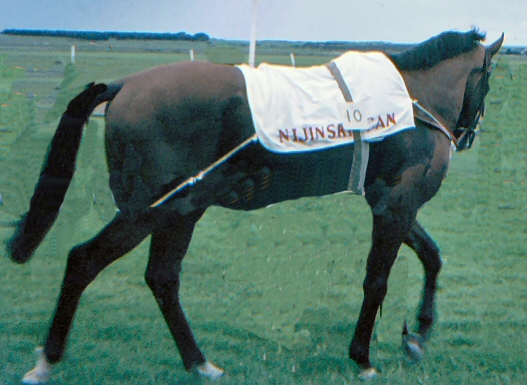
Nijinsky, the most recent English Triple Crown winner (1970)

Full list of race winners
Year	2000 Guineas	Epsom Derby	St Leger Stakes (Note: Source for 1776 – 1987. Results for 1988 onwards included under Reference subheader)
1776	Not yet founded	Not yet founded	Allabaculia ♥
1777	Not yet founded	Not yet founded	Bourbon
1778	Not yet founded	Not yet founded	Hollandaise ♥
1779	Not yet founded	Not yet founded	Tommy
1780	Not yet founded	Diomed	Ruler
1781	Not yet founded	Young Eclipse	Serina ♥
1782	Not yet founded	Assassin	Imperatrix ♥
1783	Not yet founded	Saltram	Phenomenon
1784	Not yet founded	Serjeant	Omphale ♥
1785	Not yet founded	Aimwell	Cowslip ♥
1786	Not yet founded	Noble	Paragon
1787	Not yet founded	Sir Peter Teazle	Spadille
1788	Not yet founded	Sir Thomas	Young Flora
1789	Not yet founded	Skyscraper	Pewett ♥ (Note: Zanga finished first, but was disqualified for jostling.)
1790	Not yet founded	Rhadamanthus	Ambidexter
1791	Not yet founded	Eager	Young Traveller
1792	Not yet founded	John Bull	Tartar
1793	Not yet founded	Waxy	Ninety-three
1794	Not yet founded	Daedalus	Beningbrough
1795	Not yet founded	Spread Eagle	Hambletonian
1796	Not yet founded	Didelot	Ambrosio
1797	Not yet founded	Colt by Fidget	Lounger
1798	Not yet founded	Sir Harry	Symmetry
1799	Not yet founded	Archduke	Cockfighter
1800	Not yet founded	# Champion	
1801	Not yet founded	Eleanor ♥	Quiz
1802	Not yet founded	Tyrant	Orville
1803	Not yet founded	Ditto	Remembrancer
1804	Not yet founded	Hannibal	Sancho
1805	Not yet founded	Cardinal Beaufort	Staveley
1806	Not yet founded	Paris	Fyledener
1807	Not yet founded	Election	Paulina ♥
1808	Not yet founded	Pan	Petronius
1809	Wizard	Pope	Ashton
1810	Hephestion	Whalebone	Octavian
1811	Trophonius	Phantom	Jack Spigot
1812	Cwrw	Octavius	Otterington
1813	※ Smolensko		Altisidora ♥
1814	Olive	Blucher	William
1815	Tigris	Whisker	Filho da Puta
1816	Nectar	Prince Leopold	The Duchess ♥
1817	Manfred	Azor	Ebor
1818	Interpreter	Sam	Reveller
1819	Antar	Tiresias	Antonio
1820	Pindarrie	Sailor	St. Patrick
1821	Reginald	Gustavus	Jack Spigot
1822	Pastille ♥	Moses	Theodore
1823	Nicolo	Emilius	Barefoot
1824	Schahriar	Cedric	Jerry
1825	Enamel	Middleton	Memnon
1826	Dervise	Lap-dog	Tarrare
1827	Turcoman	Mameluke	Matilda ♥
1828	※ Cadland		The Colonel
1829	Patron	Frederick	Rowton
1830	Augustus	Priam	Birmingham
1831	Riddlesworth	Spaniel	Chorister
1832	Archibald	St. Giles	Margrave
1833	Clearwell	Dangerous	Rockingham
1834	Glencoe	Plenipotentiary	Touchstone
1835	Ibrahim	Mundig	Queen of Trumps ♥
1836	※ Bay Middleton		Elis
1837	Achmet	Phosphorus	Mango
1838	Grey Momus	Amato	Don John
1839	The Corsair	Bloomsbury	Charles the Twelfth
1840	Crucifix ♥	Little Wonder	Launcelot
1841	Ralph	Coronation	Satirist
1842	Meteor	Attila	Blue Bonnet ♥
1843	⁑ Cotherstone		Nutwith
1844	The Ugly Buck	Orlando (Note: Running Rein finished first in the race, but was disqualified after it was discovered he was actually an ineligible four-year-old horse named Maccabeus.)	Faugh-a-Ballagh
1845	Idas	The Merry Monarch	The Baron
1846	# Sir Tatton Sykes	Pyrrhus the First	# Sir Tatton Sykes
1847	Conyngham	Cossack	Van Tromp
1848	Flatcatcher	# Surplice	
1849	Nunnykirk	# The Flying Dutchman	
1850	Pitsford	# Voltigeur	
1851	Hernandez	Teddington	Newminster
1852	# Stockwell	Daniel O'Rourke	# Stockwell
1853	† West Australian		
1854	The Hermit	Andover	Knight of St George
1855	Lord of the Isles	Wild Dayrell	Saucebox
1856	Fazzoletto	Ellington	Warlock
1857	Vedette	Blink Bonny ♥	Imperieuse ♥
1858	Fitz Roland	Beadsman	Sunbeam ♥
1859	Promised Land	Musjid	Gamester
1860	The Wizard	Thormanby	St. Albans
1861	Diophantus	Kettledrum	Caller Ou ♥
1862	# The Marquis	Caractacus	# The Marquis
1863	※ Macaroni		Lord Clifden
1864	General Peel	# Blair Athol	
1865	† Gladiateur		
1866	† Lord Lyon		
1867	Vauban	Hermit	Achievement ♥
1868	Formosa ♥ and Moslem (dh)	Blue Gown	Formosa ♥
1869	⁑ Pretender		Pero Gomez
1870	Macgregor	Kingcraft	Hawthornden
1871	Bothwell	Favonius	Hannah ♥
1872	Prince Charlie	Cremorne	Wenlock
1873	Gang Forward	Doncaster	Marie Stuart ♥
1874	Atlantic	George Frederick	Apology ♥
1875	Camballo	Galopin	Craig Millar
1876	# Petrarch	Kisber	# Petrarch
1877	Chamant	# Silvio	
1878	Pilgrimage ♥	Sefton	Jannette ♥
1879	Charibert	Sir Bevys	Rayon d'Or
1880	Petronel	Bend Or	Robert the Devil
1881	Peregrine	# Iroquois	
1882	⁑ Shotover ♥		Dutch Oven ♥
1883	Galliard	St. Blaise	Ossian
1884	Scot-Free	Harvester and St. Gatien (dh)	The Lambkin
1885	Paradox	# Melton	
1886	† Ormonde		
1887	Enterprise	Merry Hampton	Kilwarlin
1888	⁑ Ayrshire		Seabreeze ♥
1889	Enthusiast	# Donovan	
1890	Surefoot	Sainfoin	Memoir ♥
1891	† Common		
1892	Bona Vista	Sir Hugo	La Fleche ♥
1893	† Isinglass		
1894	⁑ Ladas		Throstle ♥
1895	Kirkconnel	# Sir Visto	
1896	St. Frusquin	# Persimmon	
1897	† Galtee More		
1898	Disraeli	Jeddah	Wildfowler
1899	† Flying Fox		
1900	† Diamond Jubilee		
1901	Handicapper	Volodyovski	Doricles
1902	# Sceptre ♥	Ard Patrick	# Sceptre ♥
1903	† Rock Sand		
1904	⁑ St. Amant		Pretty Polly ♥
1905	Vedas	Cicero	Challacombe
1906	Gorgos	Spearmint	Troutbeck
1907	Slieve Gallion	Orby	Wool Winder
1908	Norman	Signorinetta ♥	Your Majesty
1909	⁑ Minoru		Bayardo
1910	Neil Gow	Lemberg	Swynford
1911	※ Sunstar		Prince Palatine
1912	Sweeper	Tagalie ♥	Tracery
1913	Louvois	Aboyeur (Note: Craganour finished first, but was disqualified after bumping into Aboyeur in the homestraight.)	Night Hawk
1914	Kennymore	Durbar	Black Jester
1915	† Pommern		
1916	Clarissimus	Fifinella ♥	Hurry On
1917	† Gay Crusader		
1918	† Gainsborough		
1919	The Panther	Grand Parade	Keysoe ♥
1920	Tetratema	Spion Kop	Caligula
1921	Craig an Eran	Humorist	Polemarch
1922	St Louis	Captain Cuttle	Royal Lancer
1923	Ellangowan	Papyrus	Tranquil ♥
1924	Diophon	Sansovino	Salmon-Trout
1925	⁑ Manna		Solario
1926	Colorado	# Coronach	
1927	Adam's Apple	Call Boy	Book Law ♥
1928	Flamingo	Felstead	Fairway
1929	Mr Jinks	# Trigo	
1930	Diolite	Blenheim	Singapore
1931	⁑ Cameronian		Sandwich
1932	Orwell	April the Fifth	Firdaussi
1933	Rodosto	# Hyperion	
1934	Colombo	# Windsor Lad	
1935	† Bahram		
1936	Pay Up	Mahmoud	Boswell
1937	Le Ksar	Mid-day Sun	Chumleigh
1938	Pasch	Bois Roussel	Scottish Union
1939	※ Blue Peter		Race not run (Note: The 1939 St Leger Stakes was cancelled due to World War II.)
1940	Djebel	Pont l'Eveque	Turkhan
1941	Lambert Simnel	Owen Tudor	Sun Castle
1942	Big Game	Watling Street	Sun Chariot ♥
1943	Kingsway	Straight Deal	Herringbone ♥
1944	Garden Path ♥	Ocean Swell	Tehran
1945	Court Martial	Dante	Chamossaire
1946	Happy Knight	# Airborne	# Airborne
1947	Tudor Minstrel	Pearl Diver	Sayajirao
1948	My Babu	My Love	Black Tarquin
1949	※ Nimbus		Ridge Wood
1950	Palestine	Galcador	Scratch
1951	Ki Ming	Arctic Prince	Talma
1952	Thunderhead	# Tulyar	
1953	Nearula	Pinza	Premonition
1954	Darius	# Never Say Die	
1955	Our Babu	Phil Drake	Meld ♥
1956	Gilles de Retz	Lavandin	Cambremer
1957	※ Crepello		Ballymoss
1958	Pall Mall	Hard Ridden	Alcide
1959	Taboun	Parthia	Cantelo ♥
1960	Martial	# St. Paddy	
1961	Rockavon	Psidium	Aurelius
1962	Privy Councillor	Larkspur	Hethersett
1963	Only for Life	Relko	Ragusa
1964	Baldric	Santa Claus	Indiana
1965	Niksar	Sea Bird	Provoke
1966	Kashmir	Charlottown	Sodium
1967	※ Royal Palace		Ribocco
1968	※ Sir Ivor		Ribero
1969	Right Tack	Blakeney	Intermezzo
1970	† Nijinsky		
1971	Brigadier Gerard	Mill Reef	Athens Wood
1972	High Top	Roberto	Boucher
1973	Mon Fils	Morston	Peleid
1974	Nonoalco	Snow Knight	Bustino
1975	Bolkonski	Grundy	Bruni
1976	Wollow	Empery	Crow
1977	Nebbiolo	The Minstrel	Dunfermline ♥
1978	Roland Gardens	Shirley Heights	Julio Mariner
1979	Tap On Wood	Troy	Son of Love
1980	Known Fact (Note: Nureyev finished first, but was relegated to last place following a stewards' inquiry for impeeding Posse's progress.)	Henbit	Light Cavalry
1981	To-Agori-Mou	Shergar	Cut Above
1982	Zino	Golden Fleece	Touching Wood
1983	Lomond	Teenoso	Sun Princess ♥
1984	El Gran Senor	Secreto	Commanche Run
1985	Shadeed	Slip Anchor	Oh So Sharp ♥
1986	Dancing Brave	Shahrastani	Moon Madness
1987	Don't Forget Me	# Reference Point	
1988	Doyoun	Kahyasi	Minster Son
1989	※ Nashwan		Michelozzo
1990	Tirol	Quest for Fame	Snurge
1991	Mystiko	Generous	Toulon
1992	Rodrigo de Triano	Dr Devious	User Friendly ♥
1993	Zafonic	Commander in Chief	Bob's Return
1994	Mister Baileys	Erhaab	Moonax
1995	Pennekamp	Lammtarra	Classic Cliche
1996	Mark of Esteem	Shaamit	Shantou
1997	Entrepreneur	Benny the Dip	Silver Patriarch
1998	King of Kings	High-Rise	Nedawi
1999	Island Sands	Oath	Mutafaweq
2000	King's Best	Sinndar	Millenary
2001	Golan	Galileo	Milan
2002	Rock of Gibraltar	High Chaparral	Bollin Eric
2003	Refuse To Bend	Kris Kin	Brian Boru
2004	Haafhd	North Light	Rule of Law
2005	Footstepsinthesand	Motivator	Scorpion
2006	George Washington	Sir Percy	Sixties Icon
2007	Cockney Rebel	Authorized	Lucarno
2008	Henrythenavigator	New Approach	Conduit
2009	※ Sea the Stars		Mastery
2010	Makfi	Workforce	Arctic Cosmos
2011	Frankel	Pour Moi	Masked Marvel
2012	⁑ Camelot		Encke
2013	Dawn Approach	Ruler of the World	Leading Light
2014	Night of Thunder	Australia	Kingston Hill
2015	Gleneagles	Golden Horn	Simple Verse ♥ (Note: While Simple Verse finished first, Bondi Beach was originally declared the winner after Simple Verse was disqualified by stewards for race interference. This was overturned by an appeal panel eleven days later, reinstating Simple Verse as the winner.)
2016	Galileo Gold	Harzand	Harbour Law
2017	Churchill	Wings of Eagles	Capri
2018	Saxon Warrior	Masar	Kew Gardens
2019	Magna Grecia	Anthony Van Dyck	Logician
2020	Kameko	Serpentine	Galileo Chrome
2021	Poetic Flare	Adayar	Hurricane Lane
2022	Coroebus	Desert Crown	Eldar Eldarov
2023	Chaldean	Auguste Rodin	Continuous
2024	Notable Speech	City of Troy	Jan Brueghel
2025	Ruling Court	Lambourn	Scandinavia
2026	Bow Echo	Christmas Day	Highwayman
