= Spare =

Spare or Spares may refer to:

== Common meanings ==
- Spare (bowling), knocking down all remaining pins with a second roll of a bowling ball in a frame
- Spare part
- Spare tire

== People ==
- Austin Osman Spare (1886–1956), English artist and occultist
- Richard Spare (born 1951), British artist
- Charlie Spares (1917–1958), British jockey

== Other uses ==
- Spāre Station, a railway station in Spāre, Latvia
- Spare (memoir), 2023 memoir by Prince Harry, Duke of Sussex
- Spares, a 1996 novel by Michael Marshall Smith
