= 1803 in sports =

1803 in sports describes the year's events in world sport.

== Boxing ==
Events

- English champion Jem Belcher loses an eye following an injury sustained in a fives match. He retires from boxing but returns later.

== Cricket ==
Events

- Thomas Howard makes his debut in first-class cricket.

England

- Most runs – Lord Frederick Beauclerk 284 (HS 74)
- Most wickets – Lord Frederick Beauclerk 12

== Horse racing ==
England

- The Derby – Ditto
- The Oaks – Theophania
- St Leger Stakes – Remembrancer
