= Cockfighter (disambiguation) =

Cockfighter is a 1974 film by director Monte Hellman.

Cockfighter may also refer to:

- Someone who engages in cockfighting, a blood sport between roosters
- Cockfighter (horse) (1796–1807), a British racehorse
- Cockfighter, a 1962 novel by Charles Willeford from which the film was adapted
