= 1801 in sports =

1801 in sports describes the year's events in world sport.

== Bandy ==
Events

- English bandy is played in the Fens of East Anglia where large expanses of ice form on flooded meadows or shallow washes in cold winters and skating is a tradition.

== Boxing ==
Events

- The first English champion of the 19th century is Jem Belcher, known as the "Napoleon of the Ring", who holds the title from 1800 to 1805.
- 25 November — Belcher successfully defends his title by defeating Joe Berks in 16 rounds at Hurley Bottom.

== Chess ==
- Centers of chess activity in the early 19th century are coffee houses in the major European cities like Café de la Régence in Paris and Simpson's Divan in London. As the century progresses, chess organisation develops quickly with many chess clubs, chess books and chess journals appearing. Correspondence matches begin and the London Chess Club plays against the Edinburgh Chess Club in 1824.

== Cricket ==
Events

- William Lambert makes his debut in first-class cricket.

England

- Most runs – Robert Robinson 141 (HS 55)
- Most wickets – Lord Frederick Beauclerk 13

== Football ==
England

- Football at this time is still an essentially rural activity played mainly on public holidays and not so much by teams as by mobs, Shrove Tuesday being a traditional day for games across the country. There are few rules other than the aim of moving the ball towards the opposing team's goal and both kicking and handling are allowed.
- It is in the early nineteenth century that some of the public schools become interested and begin to devise their own versions, rules of which are verbally agreed and handed down over many years. Each school (e.g., Eton, Harrow, Rugby, Winchester) develops its own variations.

Ireland

- Various football games, referred to collectively as "caid", are popular in County Kerry, especially the Dingle Peninsula. Father W Ferris describes two forms of caid: the "field game" in which the object is to put the ball through arch-like goals, formed from the boughs of two trees; and the epic "cross-country game" which lasts the whole of a Sunday (after Mass) and is won by taking the ball across a parish boundary. "Wrestling", "holding" opposing players, and carrying the ball are all allowed.

== Horse racing ==
England

- The Derby – Eleanor
- The Oaks – Eleanor
- St Leger Stakes – Quiz

== Lacrosse ==
Events

- Early 19th century — Europeans in Canada begin playing lacrosse
