= Antonio (horse) =

British-bred Thoroughbred racehorse

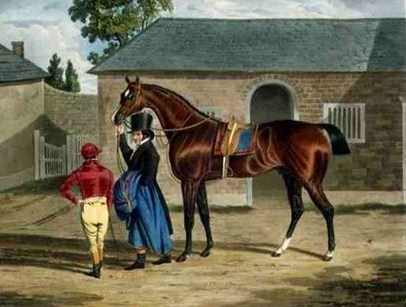
- 'Antonio', the Winner of the Great St. Leger at Doncaster, 1819 by John Frederick Herring Sr.
- Sire: Octavian
- Grandsire: Stripling
- Dam: Evander mare
- Damsire: Evander
- Sex: Stallion
- Foaled: 1816
- Country: United Kingdom
- Colour: Bay
- Owner: James Ferguson; John Clifton
- Trainer: John Lonsdale
- Record: 13: 6-6-1

Major wins
- St Leger Stakes (1819); Palatine Stakes (1820); Grosvenor Stakes (1822); Chester Stand Cup (1822)

Antonio (1816–1828) was a British Thoroughbred racehorse and sire best known for winning a controversial race for the classic St Leger Stakes in 1819. The classic was run twice after claims of an irregular start, but Antonio's victory in the original running was eventually allowed to stand. The rest of his racing career, which lasted from April 1819 until May 1822 was relatively undistinguished although he won five other races. After two minor successes in 1820 he missed the whole of the 1821 before returning as a six-year-old to win two races at Chester. He was then retired to stud where he had limited success as a sire of winners before his death in 1828.

== Background ==
Antonio was a bay horse with a white star and snip and white socks on his hind feet bred by James Ferguson, an innkeeper from Catterick Bridge. His dam was an unnamed mare sired by Evander, a stallion who was exported to Russia in 1813. Antonio was one of only two classic winners produced by Thoroughbred family number 34, the other being his distant relative Birmingham who won the St Leger in 1830. He was from the second crop of foals sired by the 1810 St Leger winner Octavian who stood as a stallion at Oran Farm near Catterick. The colt was sent into training with John Lonsdale.

== Racing career ==
=== 1819: three-year-old season ===
Antonio began his racing career at Catterick Bridge Racecourse on 15 April 1819 when he was beaten by his only opponent Agricola in the Old Stakes over two miles. A week later at Middleham he finished second to Ralph Riddell's four-year-old Roman in a two-mile weight-for-age race. On the following day he ran in a maiden race which was run in a series of heats, with the prize going to the first horse to win twice. Antonio won the first heat, finished second to the filly Shadow in the second and then claimed his first victory by defeating Shadow in the deciding heat. In June, Antonio ran at Newcastle Racecourse in Northumberland where he finished second to the four-year-old Mandeville in the weight-for-age Members' Plate.

On 18 September, Antonio was one of nineteen colts and fillies to contest the forty-fourth running of the St Leger Stakes at Doncaster Racecourse. Following the withdrawal of Sultan, who was injured on the morning of the race, the betting was headed by Henry Peirse's colt Wrangler, who started at odds of 7/4 ahead of Sir Walter and Agricola on 7/1. Antonio, ridden by Thomas Nicholson, was one of the outsiders, being offered at odds of 25 and 30/1. The start was faulty, with five horses being left behind when the starter, Mr Lockwood gave the signal for the race to begin. Antonio won the classic from Wrangler, with Archibald in third place, but several owners immediately lodged a protest. The racecourse stewards ordered a rerun, but James Ferguson refused to let Antonio compete again, insisting that the original race had been valid: Mr Lockwood also refused to handle the second race, as he believed the first start had been a fair one. Ten horses contested the second running of the race saw Colonel Craddock's colt Sir Walter finish first, with Wrangler and Archibald again finishing second and third. The matter was referred to the Jockey Club which decided on 5 November that Antonio's victory had been legitimate, and that the stewards should not have allowed the second race to be run. The judgment appears to have been a popular one, especially at Catterick Bridge, where it was received with "joy and exultation". The affair led to calls for the starting procedure for major races to be reformed, with the use of a flag being strongly advocated to counter the tactical ploys of "cunning jockeys" who were thought to manipulate the existing rules to obtain an unfair advantage. Following the confirmation of his win, Antonio was sold for 1,000 guineas to John Clifton.

=== 1820: four-year-old season ===
On his four-year-old debut Antonio started the 1/2 favourite for the Gold Cup at Manchester Racecourse, but was beaten a head by the gelding Anti-Radical. Later at the meeting he was allowed to walk over for the Palatine Stakes over two and three quarter miles. In July he met the "other" St Leger winner Sir Walter in the Corporation Gold Cup at Lancaster but the two four-year-olds were easily beaten by the nine-year-old Doctor Syntax. Later that month Antonio "won easy" from his only opponent in a sweepstakes at Preston but at York Racecourse in August he was beaten by Wrangler in a division of the Great Subscription Purse. In September he returned the scene of his classic victory and finished second to The Laird in a sweepstakes at Doncaster.

=== 1822: six-year-old season ===
Antonio missed the whole of the 1821 season before returning as a six-year-old in 1822. On 6 May he started 5/2 second favourite for the weight-for-age Grosvenor Stakes over a mile and a quarter at Chester Racecourse and won from four opponents. On the following afternoon, Antonio won the Stand Cup at the same venue, beating Sir Thomas Stanley's Tarragon (the favourite) and three others after what was described as "a fine race".

== Stud career ==
Antonio was retired from racing to become a breeding stallion. The best of his offspring was Fylde, who won the Chester Cup in 1828, and became a reasonably successful stallion in the United States. According to the General Stud Book, Antonio died at Preston on 25 February 1828 at the age of twelve.

== Pedigree ==
Pedigree of Antonio (GB), bay stallion, 1816
Sire Octavian (GB) 1807	Stripling; 1795	Phoenomenon*	Herod
Sire Octavian (GB) 1807	Stripling; 1795	Phoenomenon*	Frenzy
Sire Octavian (GB) 1807	Stripling; 1795	Laura	Eclipse*
Sire Octavian (GB) 1807	Stripling; 1795	Laura	Locust mare
Sire Octavian (GB) 1807	Oberon mare	Oberon	Highflyer*
Sire Octavian (GB) 1807	Oberon mare	Oberon	Queen Mab
Sire Octavian (GB) 1807	Oberon mare	sister to Sharper	Ranthos
Sire Octavian (GB) 1807	Oberon mare	sister to Sharper	Sweepstakes mare
Dam Evander mare (GB) 1811	Evander; 1801	Delpini	Highflyer*
Dam Evander mare (GB) 1811	Evander; 1801	Delpini	Countess
Dam Evander mare (GB) 1811	Evander; 1801	Caroline	Phoenomenon*
Dam Evander mare (GB) 1811	Evander; 1801	Caroline	Faith
Dam Evander mare (GB) 1811	Miss Gunpowder; 1797	Gunpowder	Eclipse*
Dam Evander mare (GB) 1811	Miss Gunpowder; 1797	Gunpowder	Miss Spindleshanks
Dam Evander mare (GB) 1811	Miss Gunpowder; 1797	Young Marske mare	Young Marske
Dam Evander mare (GB) 1811	Miss Gunpowder; 1797	Young Marske mare	Arbitrator mare (Family:34)

* Antonio is inbred 3S × 4D to the stallion Phoenomenon, meaning that he appears third generation on the sire side of his pedigree and fourth generation on the dam side of his pedigree.

* Antonio is inbred 4S x 4D to the stallion Eclipse, meaning that he appears fourth generation on the sire side of his pedigree and fourth generation on the dam side of his pedigree.

* Antonio is inbred 4S x 4D to the stallion Highflyer, meaning that he appears fourth generation on the sire side of his pedigree and fourth generation on the dam side of his pedigree.

== Sire line tree ==
- Antonio
  - Fylde
    - Black Prince
    - Steel
      - Young Steel
    - Tom Thurman
    - Altorf
      - St Louis
        - Ben Hallet
