= Paulina (horse) =

British-bred Thoroughbred racehorse

- Sire: Sir Peter Teazle
- Grandsire: Highflyer
- Dam: Pewett
- Damsire: Tandem
- Sex: Mare
- Foaled: 1804
- Country: United Kingdom
- Colour: Bay
- Breeder: William Fitzwilliam, 4th Earl Fitzwilliam
- Owner: William Fitzwilliam, 4th Earl Fitzwilliam
- Trainer: Christopher Scaife
- Record: 14: 9-5-0

Major wins
- St Leger Stakes (1807); Prince's Stakes (1808); Great Subscription Purse (1809); King's Plate at Richmond (1809)

Paulina (1804–1819) was a British Thoroughbred racehorse and broodmare best known for winning the classic St Leger Stakes in 1807. In a racing career which lasted from August 1806 until October 1809 she won nine times from fourteen races, all of which took place in Yorkshire. She was undefeated in three races as an unnamed two-year-old, before winning three of her four races in 1807 including the St Leger at Doncaster and a valuable produce sweepstakes at York. She won once from two starts as a four-year-old before winning a Great Subscription Purse at York and a King's Plate at Richmond in 1809. She had a long rivalry with another Yorkshire mare named Thomasina, winning three of their five meetings. Paulina was retired to stud where she became the female-line ancestor of many important winners including Andover and Sir Tatton Sykes.

== Background ==
Paulina was a bay mare bred by her owner William Fitzwilliam, 4th Earl Fitzwilliam. Her sire, Sir Peter Teazle (or simply "Sir Peter") won the Epsom Derby in 1787 and became the most successful stallion of the time, winning the title of Champion sire on ten occasions between 1799 and 1809. Paulina's dam Pewett won the St Leger for Lord Fitzwilliam in 1789 before becoming a highly successful and influential broodmare. Before foaling Paulina she had produced Sir Paul, who won the Craven Stakes and finished third in the 1805 St Leger. Pewett went on to produce the broodmare Clinkerina, whose descendants included the stallion Humphrey Clinker and the double classic winner Exhibitionnist.

== Racing career ==
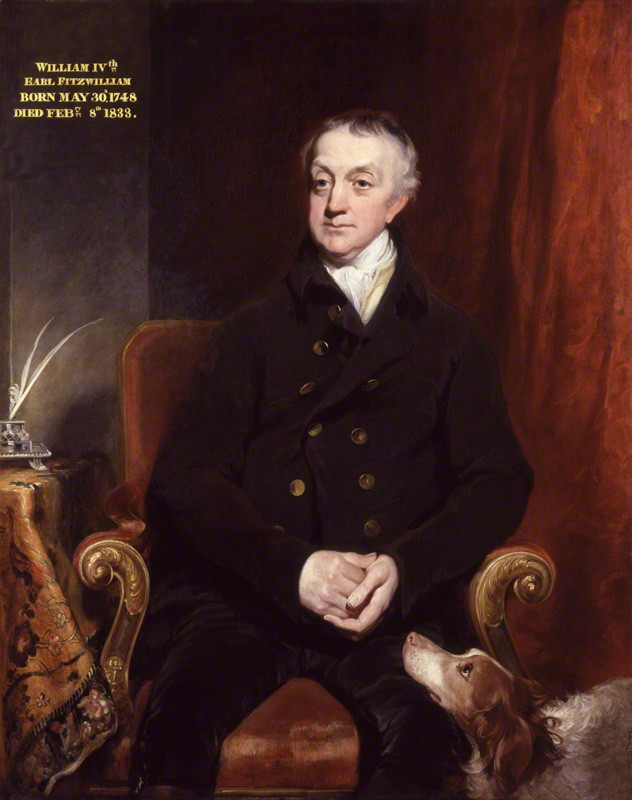
The 4th Earl Fitzwilliam, who bred and owned Paulina

=== 1806: two-year-old season ===
Until 1913, there was no requirement for British racehorses to have official names, and the filly who later became known as Paulina competed in 1806 as Lord Fitzwilliam's b. f., sister to Sir Paul by Sir Peter. She made her debut on 19 August at York Racecourse, where she ran in a sweepstakes for two-year-old colts and fillies. Starting at odds of 8/1, she won by half a neck from Sir Thomas Gascoigne's chestnut filly by Timothy after "a very fine race". At Pontefract Racecourse on 10 September, the sister to Sir Paul defeated her only opponent, Lord Darlington's brother to Bumper in a one-mile sweepstakes. At the St Leger meeting at Doncaster was she matched against the Sir Thomas Gascoigne's chestnut filly by Timothy in a sweepstakes and won at odds of 4/6 to complete her first season unbeaten.

=== 1807: three-year-old season ===
For the 1807 season, the sister to Sir Paul was officially named Paulina whilst Sir Thomas Gascoigne's filly was named Thomasina. The two fillies met for the third time at York on 26 May in a one-and-a-half-mile sweepstakes in which Paulina finished second to her rival. At the next York meeting in August, Paulina won a two-mile produce sweepstakes worth 1,500 guineas, beating Lord Monson's colt Scud at odds of 7/2.

At Doncaster on 21 September, Paulina was one of sixteen colts and fillies to contest the thirty-second running of the St Leger. Ridden by Ben Smith, she started the 8/1 third choice in the betting, behind Lord Grosvenor's colt Eaton and Mr Garforth's bay colt by Beningbrough. After what was described as an "uncommonly good race", she won the classic by less than a length from Scud, with Eaton in third and Mr Garforth's colt in fourth. Three days later, Paulina reappeared in a sweepstakes over two miles and won at odds of 1/4 from a filly named Margaret, her only opponent. At the same meeting, Thomasina and Scud defeated older horses in the Doncaster Stakes and the Doncaster Cup respectively.

=== 1808: four-year-old season ===
Paulina's four-year-old season was restricted to two races at Doncaster's St Leger meeting in September. On the opening day of the meeting she was defeated by Scud in a four-mile match race in which she carried two pounds more than the colt. On the following day she won the Prince's Stakes, over the same distance, beating Lord Darlington's unnamed brother to Expectation.

=== 1809: five-year-old season ===
On 21 August 1809, Paulina began her final season with a match against Thomasina over two miles at York. She started the 5/11 favourite, but was beaten by her rival, to whom she was conceding three pounds. Two days later, Paulina started 6/5 favourite for a division of the Great Subscription Purse over four miles. Ridden by Bill Clift, she won by a length after "a very fine race" against the colts Poulton and Archduke. On 12 September at Pontefract Racecourse, Paulina finished second to the Duke of Leeds four-year-old colt Mowbray in a four-mile sweepstakes in which she was conceding nine pounds to the winner. Paulina's next appearance was at Lincoln on 20 September when she contested a King's Plate, a race run in a series of two-mile heats, with the prize going to the first to win twice. Paulina, carrying top weight of 119 pounds finished third to Laurel-Leaf in the first heat, and second to Tutelina in the next two. Paulina ended her racing career in a four-mile King's Plate on 11 October at Richmond where she met Thomasina for the final time. Thomasina was favoured in the betting, but Paulina defeated her old rival to end her career with a victory.

== Stud career ==
Paulina was retired from racing to become broodmare and had a long-lasting influence on the Thoroughbred breed: she is regarded as the Foundation mare of Thoroughbred family 8-e. In 1816 she produced a filly sired by Amadis named Galatea whose daughter, Soldier's Joy was the grand-dam of the Derby winner Andover. Another of Galatea's daughters was Sybil, the female-line ancestor of both the 2000 Guineas and St Leger winner Sir Tatton Sykes and Lady Elizabeth, the foundation mare of Thoroughbred family 8-j. Paulina died in 1819 while in foal to Comus.

== Pedigree ==
Pedigree of Paulina (GB), bay mare, 1804
Sire Sir Peter Teazle (GB) 1784	Highflyer; 1774	Herod	Tartar
Sire Sir Peter Teazle (GB) 1784	Highflyer; 1774	Herod	Cypron
Sire Sir Peter Teazle (GB) 1784	Highflyer; 1774	Rachel	Blank
Sire Sir Peter Teazle (GB) 1784	Highflyer; 1774	Rachel	Regulus mare
Sire Sir Peter Teazle (GB) 1784	Papillon; 1769	Snap	Snip
Sire Sir Peter Teazle (GB) 1784	Papillon; 1769	Snap	sister to Slipby
Sire Sir Peter Teazle (GB) 1784	Papillon; 1769	Miss Cleveland	Regulus
Sire Sir Peter Teazle (GB) 1784	Papillon; 1769	Miss Cleveland	Midge
Dam Pewett (GB) 1786	Tandem; 1773	Syphon	Squirt
Dam Pewett (GB) 1786	Tandem; 1773	Syphon	Patriot mare
Dam Pewett (GB) 1786	Tandem; 1773	Regulus mare (1762)	Regulus
Dam Pewett (GB) 1786	Tandem; 1773	Regulus mare (1762)	Snip mare
Dam Pewett (GB) 1786	Termagant; 1772	Tantrum	Cripple
Dam Pewett (GB) 1786	Termagant; 1772	Tantrum	Childers mare
Dam Pewett (GB) 1786	Termagant; 1772	Cantatrice	Sampson
Dam Pewett (GB) 1786	Termagant; 1772	Cantatrice	Regulus mare (1757)(Family:8-a)

- Paulina was inbred 4 × 4 to Regulus, meaning that this stallion appears twice in the third generation of her pedigree.
