= Alipes (horse) =

British Thoroughbred racehorse

- Sire: Regulus
- Grandsire: Godolphin Arabian
- Dam: Lusty
- Damsire: Locust
- Sex: Mare
- Foaled: 1757
- Country: Great Britain
- Colour: Brown or Bay
- Breeder: William Swinburn
- Owner: Sir B. Graham; 1st Baron Grosvenor
- Record: 8: 8-0-0

Major wins
- Jockey Club Plate (1761); Great Subscription Purse (1761); Hambleton King's Plate (1762); Newmarket King's Plate for Mares (1763)

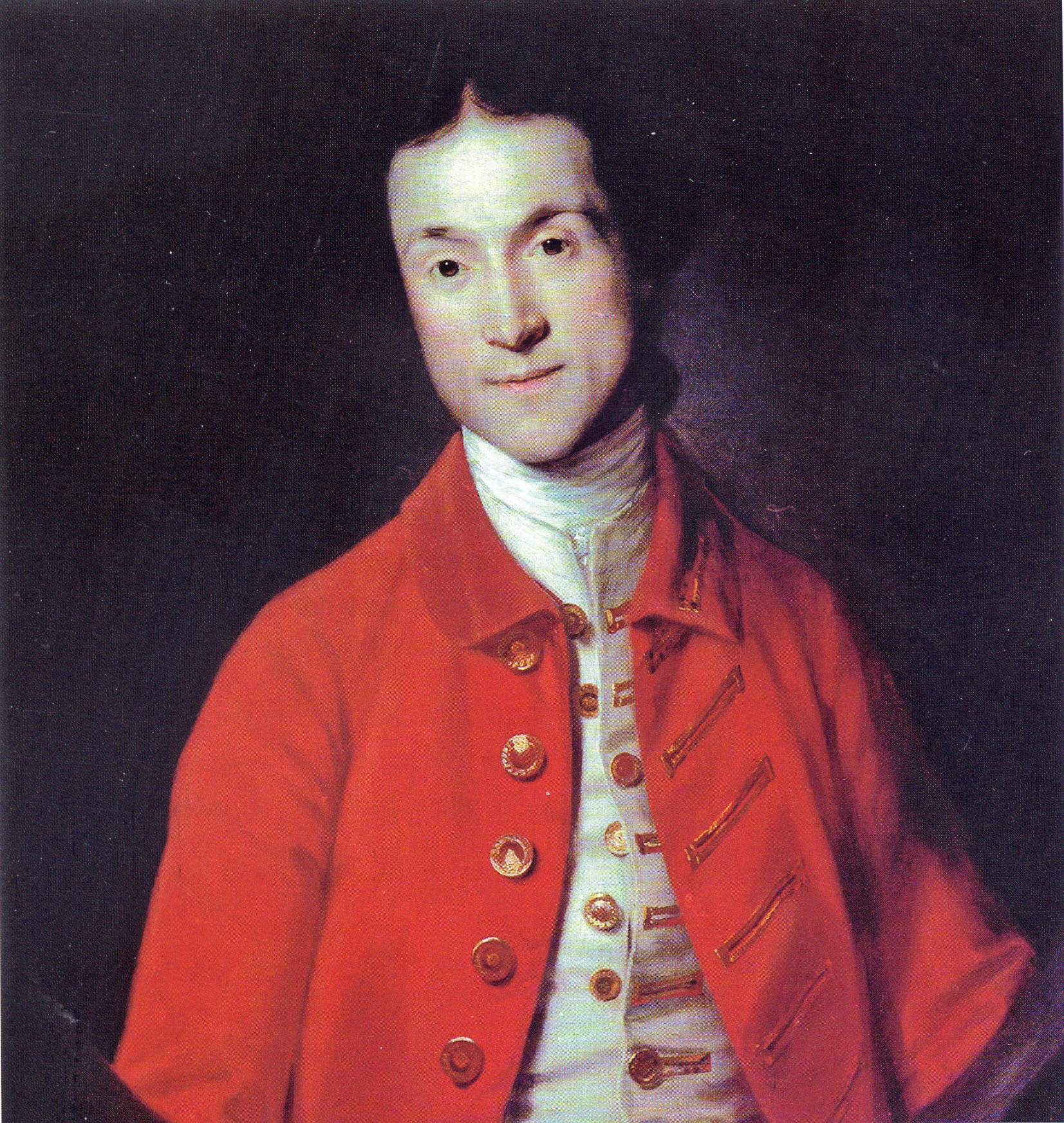
Alipes' owner, the Richard Grosvenor, 1st Earl Grosvenor

Alipes (1757) was an undefeated British Thoroughbred racehorse who won all eight of her races, including the 1761 Great Subscription Purse. She was owned by Sir B. Graham and later Richard Grosvenor.

== Background ==
Alipes was a brown or bay filly bred by William Swinburn and foaled in 1757. She was sired by the unbeaten Regulus, who was British Champion sire eight times. Her dam was Lusty, a daughter of Locust.

== Racing career ==
Alipes first race was at the age of four in March 1761 at Newmarket Racecourse, where she won a sweepstakes of 300 guineas. The following month she beat Sir J. Moore's Dupe, John Howe's Dormouse filly, Sir Charles Sedley's Aelous and eight others to win the Jockey Club Plate. In June, she won the Subscription Purse at Newcastle by beating Mark and Trudge. At York Racecourse she faced Mark, Leander, Wilson's Arabian, Blank and Strawberry in the Great Subscription Purse for four-year-olds. She won the race after starting as the evens favourite. She finished the 1761 season by winning a 420 guineas sweepstakes at Richmond.

Alipes was then purchased by the 1st Baron Grosvenor, Richard Grosvenor. At Hambleton in 1762 she beat William FitzRoy's Miss Lincoln to win the King's Plate. She also won a race at Lincoln in 1762. Her final race came in April 1763 at Newmarket, where she won the King's Plate for Mares from Imogin and four others. She was then retired to stud unbeaten in her eight starts.

== Stud career ==
As a broodmare at Grosvenor's stud, she produced six foals. They were:

- Bandy filly – a bay filly foaled in 1764.
- Grasshopper – a bay filly, foaled in 1765 and sired by Bandy.
- Imogen – a bay filly foaled in 1767 and sired by Belford. She won a race at Newmarket and one at Lichfield in 1771. She produced eight foals, including Nimble (by Goldfinder) and Fencer (by Sweetbriar).
- Pangloss colt – foaled in 1768.
- Chrysolite colt – foaled in 1770.
- Squirrel colt – foaled in 1773 and sired by Squirrel.

== See also ==
- List of leading Thoroughbred racehorses

== Pedigree ==
Pedigree of Alipes, brown or bay mare, 1757
Sire Regulus (GB) 1739	Godolphin Arabian	(unknown)	(unknown)
Sire Regulus (GB) 1739	Godolphin Arabian	(unknown)	(unknown)
Sire Regulus (GB) 1739	Godolphin Arabian	(unknown)	(unknown)
Sire Regulus (GB) 1739	Godolphin Arabian	(unknown)	(unknown)
Sire Regulus (GB) 1739	Grey Robinson	Bald Galloway	St Victor's Barb
Sire Regulus (GB) 1739	Grey Robinson	Bald Galloway	Whynot mare
Sire Regulus (GB) 1739	Grey Robinson	Snake mare	Snake
Sire Regulus (GB) 1739	Grey Robinson	Snake mare	Grey Wilkes
Dam Lusty (GB) 1751	Locust	Crab; 1722	Alcock's Arabian
Dam Lusty (GB) 1751	Locust	Crab; 1722	Basto mare
Dam Lusty (GB) 1751	Locust	Fox mare	Fox
Dam Lusty (GB) 1751	Locust	Fox mare	Childers mare
Dam Lusty (GB) 1751	Pamela; 1744	Orion	(unknown)
Dam Lusty (GB) 1751	Pamela; 1744	Orion	(unknown)
Dam Lusty (GB) 1751	Pamela; 1744	Young Greyhound mare	Young Greyhound
Dam Lusty (GB) 1751	Pamela; 1744	Young Greyhound mare	Faustina
