= Arctic Prince =

Irish-bred Thoroughbred racehorse

- Sire: Prince Chevalier
- Grandsire: Prince Rose
- Dam: Arctic Sun
- Damsire: Nearco
- Sex: Stallion
- Foaled: 1948
- Country: Ireland
- Colour: Brown
- Breeder: Joseph McGrath
- Owner: Joseph McGrath
- Trainer: Willie Stephenson
- Record: 5: 2-0-0
- Earnings: £

Major wins
- Epsom Derby (1951)

Arctic Prince (1948–1969) was an Irish-bred Thoroughbred racehorse and sire who was trained in England during a brief racing career which lasted from 1950 to 1951 and consisted of only five races. Arctic Prince won two races including the 1951 Derby and was retired after breaking down at Ascot in July of the same year.

== Background ==
Arctic Prince was a brown horse bred in Ireland by his owner Joseph McGrath. He was one of the first crop of foals sired by Prince Chevalier who won the Prix du Jockey Club in 1946 before going on to a successful stud career. Apart from Arctic Prince, his most notable offspring was Charlotteville who won the Prix du Jockey Club and the Grand Prix de Paris and sired the 1966 Derby winner Charlottown. Arctic Prince's dam, Arctic Sun, was a successful racemare who won the Anglesey Stakes in 1943. Arctic Prince was sent into training with Willie Stephenson at Royston, Hertfordshire.

== Racing career ==
=== 1950: two-year-old season ===
Arctic Prince first appeared on the racecourse in a maiden race at Redcar in which he recorded a six length victory. He was then moved up in class for the Gimcrack Stakes at York in which he finished unplaced behind Cortil.

=== 1951: three-year-old season ===
As a three-year-old, Arctic Prince was sent directly to the 2000 Guineas at Newmarket Racecourse without a trial race. He ran on strongly in the closing stages of the one mile Classic to finish seventh of the twenty-seven runners behind Ki Ming.

A month later, Arctic Prince started at odds of 28/1 in a field of thirty-three for the Derby, which, with a total prize of £22,625 was the most valuable race ever run in England. He was ridden by Chuck Spares, a jockey who was best known for his successes in National Hunt racing and was having his first ride in the Derby. The crowd was estimated at up to 1,000,000 and included the Queen, and Princess Elizabeth, the King being too ill to attend. Ki Ming who started favourite, disputed the lead with Mystery IX until the horses turned into the straight. Arctic Prince, who was always prominent, overtook Mystery IX to take the lead early in the straight and pulled clear of the field to win easily by six lengths from Sybil's Nephew. Spares explained that "I took the lead and then it was all over." Stephenson commented that Arctic Prince "was definitely unlucky to lose the 2000 Guineas and I thought that he would win today as I know that he stays."

In July Arctic Prince was sent to Ascot for the inaugural running of the King George VI and Queen Elizabeth Stakes. The colt finished unplaced behind Supreme Court, sustaining an injury which ended his racing career.

== Assessment ==
Timeform awarded Arctic Prince a rating of 135, the highest for a three-year-old in 1951. A rating of 130 is considered the mark of an above average European Group One winner.

In their book A Century of Champions, John Randall and Tony Morris rated Arctic Prince an “average” Derby winner and the one hundred and ninth best British racehorse of the 20th Century .

== Stud career ==
Arctic Prince stood as a stallion in Britain for four years before being sold for a reported $900,000 and exported to America in 1956. The best of his European progeny was the Eclipse Stakes winner Arctic Explorer. He was also the damsire of the 1964 Derby winner Santa Claus.

== Sire line tree ==
- Arctic Prince
  - Arctic Explorer
  - Exar
    - Tatti Jacopo

== Pedigree ==
Pedigree of Arctic Prince (IRE), brown stallion, 1948
Sire Prince Chevalier (FR) 1943	Prince Rose; 1928	Rose Prince	Prince Palatine
Sire Prince Chevalier (FR) 1943	Prince Rose; 1928	Rose Prince	Eglantine
Sire Prince Chevalier (FR) 1943	Prince Rose; 1928	Indolence	Gay Crusader
Sire Prince Chevalier (FR) 1943	Prince Rose; 1928	Indolence	Barrier
Sire Prince Chevalier (FR) 1943	Chevalerie; 1933	Abbot’s Speed	Abbots Trace
Sire Prince Chevalier (FR) 1943	Chevalerie; 1933	Abbot’s Speed	Mary Gaunt
Sire Prince Chevalier (FR) 1943	Chevalerie; 1933	Kassala	Cylgad
Sire Prince Chevalier (FR) 1943	Chevalerie; 1933	Kassala	Farizade
Dam Arctic Sun (GB) 1941	Nearco; 1935	Pharos	Phalaris
Dam Arctic Sun (GB) 1941	Nearco; 1935	Pharos	Scapa Flow
Dam Arctic Sun (GB) 1941	Nearco; 1935	Nogara	Havresac
Dam Arctic Sun (GB) 1941	Nearco; 1935	Nogara	Catnip
Dam Arctic Sun (GB) 1941	Solar Flower; 1935	Solario	Gainsborough
Dam Arctic Sun (GB) 1941	Solar Flower; 1935	Solario	Sun Worship
Dam Arctic Sun (GB) 1941	Solar Flower; 1935	Serena	Winalot
Dam Arctic Sun (GB) 1941	Solar Flower; 1935	Serena	Charmione (Family: 10-c)
