= Great Subscription Purse =

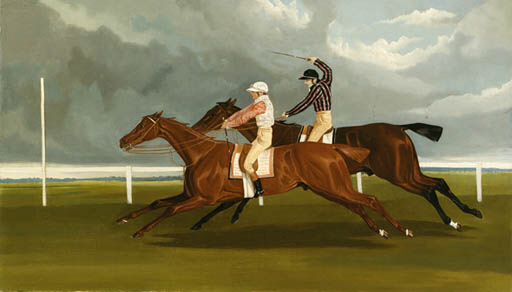
- A painting by Benjamin Herring showing Actaeon beating Memnon in the 1826 Great Subscription Purse for four-year-olds
- Class: Horse
- Location: York Racecourse; York, England
- Inaugurated: 1751
- Race type: Flat / Thoroughbred

Race information
- Distance: 4 miles
- Surface: Turf
- Qualification: Various (see History)
- Weight: Various (see History)
- Purse: £50 added to one third of total subscription

The Great Subscription Purses were a series of flat horse races in Great Britain run at York Racecourse, usually over a distance of 4 miles, that took place each year in August from 1751 to 1833. During the second half of the 18th century they were amongst the most important races in the county, but during the 19th century their importance declined as racing became more focused on shorter distances.

== History ==
The races first commenced in 1751, with a four-mile race for five-year-olds, each carrying 10 stone, run on the Wednesday of York's August meeting. On the Friday of the meeting a race was run for four-year-olds, each carrying 9 stone. The four-year-old's race was run in two-mile heats.

The format was changed in 1759, with a race for horses aged six and over being added on the Thursday. From 1759 onwards all three races were run over four miles in a single heat.

The conditions of the races were changed in 1818. A race for five-year-olds and older was run on the Tuesday. In the race five-year-olds carried 8 st 7 lb, six-year-olds carried 8 st 12 lb and seven-year-olds and older carried 9 st. A race for four-year-olds was run on Wednesday. In this race colts carried 8 st 7 lb and fillies carried 8 st 4 lb. The final race was for four-year-olds and five-year-olds and was run on Thursday. Four-year-olds carried 8 st and five-year-olds carried 8 st 11 lb. All races were still run over four miles.

In 1826 the four-year-old race and the four- and five-year-old race were both shortened to two miles. In the four-year-old race the weights stayed the same and in the four- and five-year-old race four-year-olds carried 8 st 3 lb and five-year-olds 8 st 10 lb. The races were discontinued after the 1833 runnings.

== Records ==
Most successful horse (5 wins):

- Catton – 1814 (5 yo & 6 yo+), 1815 (6 yo+), 1816 (6 yo+), 1825 (6 yo+)

== Winners 1751–1817 ==
| Year | 4yo race winner | Owner | 5yo race winner | Owner | 6yo+ race winner | Owner |
|---|---|---|---|---|---|---|
| 1751 | Spanker | Mr. Hunt | Skim | 2nd Earl of Portmore |
| 1752 | Duchess | William Fenwick | Scampston-Cade | Sir William St Quintin |
| 1753 | Tantivy | Mr. Mann | Match'em | William Fenwick |
| 1754 | Syphon | William Fenwick | Whistlejacket | Sir W. Middleton |
| 1755 | Judgment | Mr. Swinburn | Romulus | 4th Earl of Sandwich |
| 1756 | Miner | Mr. Robinson | Brisk | Sir John Ramsden |
| 1757 | Wildair | Mr. Swinburn | Hambleton | Mr. Swinburn |
| 1758 | Fairy | 4th Duke of Devonshire | Hero | W. Preston |
| 1759 | Panglos | Mr. Dixon | Silvio | Mr. Hutton | Careless | Mr. Warren |
| 1760 | Boreas | Mr. Dixon | Engineer | Mr. Fenton | Careless | Mr. Warren |
| 1761 | Alipes | Sir B. Graham | Skipjack | Mr. Wentworth | Scrub | 2nd Marquess of Rockingham |
| 1762 | Eloisa | Mr.Dixon | Julius Caesar | Mr. Smith | Skipjack | Mr. Wentworth |
| 1763 | Miracle | Mr. Pratt | Yorkshire Jenny | Mr. Vevers | Engineer | Mr. Fenton |
| 1764 | Cygnet | R. Shafto | Shuttle | Mr. Fenwick | Beaufremont | Mr. Stapleton |
| 1765 | Dux | Mr. Fenwick | Royal George | Mr. Coulson | Antinous | 3rd Duke of Grafton |
| 1766 | Petruchio | Mr. Pratt | Dux | Mr. Fenwick | Bay Malton | 2nd Marquess of Rockingham |
| 1767 | A-la-greque | Mr. Pratt | Morwick-Ball | Mr. Vevers | Beaufremont | Mr. Stapleton |
| 1768 | Cosmo | Mr. Thompson | A-la-greque | Mr. Pratt | Pilgrim | 2nd Marquess of Rockingham |
| 1769 | Holyhock | 2nd Viscount Bolingbroke | Bucephalus | Peregrine Wentworth | Chatsworth | Sir Lawrence Dundas |
| 1770 | Amaranthus | J. S. Barry | Carabineer | Mr. Vevers | Eclipse | Dennis O'Kelly |
| 1771 | Miss Timms | Mr. Pratt | Amaranthus | J. S. Barry | Holyhock | Mr. Blake |
| 1772 | Lady Bell | Mr. Fenwick | Lothario | Mr. Wentworth | Mark | Mr. Wentworth |
| 1773 | Perdita | Sir John Lister Kaye | Scaramouch | 2nd Duke of Kingston | Regulator | Sir Charles Sedley |
| 1774 | Takamahaka | 4th Earl of Abingdon | Perdita | Sir John Lister Kaye | Trentham | Sir Charles Sedley |
| 1775 | Infidel | Mr. Bethell | Pilot | Sir Harry Harpur | Juniper | Sir Harry Harpur |
| 1776 | Tuberose | Sir Thomas Gascoigne | Miss Cornforth | Mr. Preston | Maiden | Mr. Pratt |
| 1777 | Cannibal | Sir Thomas Gascoigne | Dorimant | 16th Earl of Ormonde | Pilot | Sir Harry Harpur |
| 1778 | Bourdeaux | Mr. Douglas | Magog | Sir Thomas Gascoigne | Carbuncle | Mr. Osbaldeston |
| 1779 | Honest Robin | Mr. Bethell | Highflyer | Mr. Tattersall | Highflyer | Mr. Tattersall |
| 1780 | Copperbottom | 2nd Marquess of Rockingham | Duchess | Mr. Burdon | Orpheus | Mr. Burdon |
| 1781 | Fortitude | 1st Baron Grosvenor | Hermit | Mr. Hutchinson | Duchess | Mr. Burdon |
| 1782 | Thornville | Mr. Wentworth | Privateer | Mr. Pratt | Privateer | Mr. Pratt |
| 1783 | Columbus | Mr. Wentworth | Recovery | Sir John Lister Kaye | Fortitude | 1st Baron Grosvenor |
| 1784 | Phoenomenon | Sir John Lister Kaye | Phoenomenon | Sir John Lister Kaye | Faith | Mr. Garforth |
| 1785 | Pitch | Mr. Hutchinson | Temperance | Earl of Surrey | Glancer | Mr. Wentworth |
| 1786 | Verjuice | Mr. Wentworth | Delhini | Sir F. Standish | Delhini | Sir F. Standish |
| 1787 | Windlestone | Mr. Wetherell | Verjuice | Mr. Wentworth | Rockingham | Mr. Bullock |
| 1788 | Bustler | 5th Duke of Bedford | Windlestone | Mr. Wetherell | Dubskelper | 11th Duke of Norfolk |
| 1789 | Traveller | Mr. Hutchinson | Spadille | Lord A. Hamilton | Cavendish | Mr. Baker |
| 1790 | Walnut | Lord A. Hamilton | Escape | Prince of Wales | Dubskelper | 11th Duke of Norfolk |
| 1791 | Contessina | Mr. Peirse | Walnut | Lord A. Hamilton | Tickle Toby | Mr. Waftell |
| 1792 | Overton | Mr.Hutchinson | Contessina | Mr. Peirse | Tickle Toby | Mr. Robertson |
| 1793 | Cayenne | 1st Earl Grosvenor | Huby | Mr. Wentworth | Tickle Toby | Mr. Robertson |
| 1794 | Oberon | Mr. Hutchinson | Ormond | Mr. Wentworth | Rosamond | Mr. Peirse |
| 1795 | Phoenomenon colt | Mr. Garforth | Screveton | Mr. Baker | Ormond | Mr. Wentworth |
| 1796 | Hambletonian | Sir Charles Turner | Eliza | Mr. Wilson | Screveton | Mr. Baker |
| 1797 | Harry Rowe | Mr. Wentworth | Hambletonian | Sir Harry Vane Tempest | Hambletonian | Sir Harry Vane Tempest |
| 1798 | Stamford | Sir F. Standish | Hyperion | Mr. Dawson | Hyperion | Mr. Dawson |
| 1799 | Jonas | Mr. Baker | Timothy | Sir Thomas Gascoigne | Ambrosio | Mr. Cookson |
| 1800 | Cockfighter | Sir Harry Vane Tempest | Walnut horse | Mr. Peirse | Hambletonian | Sir Harry Vane Tempest |
| 1801 | Agonistes | Earl of Darlington | Cockfighter | Sir Harry Vane Tempest | Cockfighter | Sir Harry Vane Tempest |
| 1802 | Quiz | Mr. Dawson | Haphazard | Earl of Darlington | Sir Solomon | Mr. Johnson |
| 1803 | Stockton | Mr. Mellish | Alonzo | Mr. Bradling | Haphazard | Earl of Darlington |
| 1804 | Remembrancer | 10th Earl of Strathmore | Traveller horse | Mr. Garforth | Haphazard | Earl of Darlington |
| 1805 | Vesta | Mr. Garforth | Ferguson | Mr. Peirse | Marcia | Mr. Garforth |
| 1806 | Trafalgar | Earl of Darlington | Vesta | Mr. Garforth | Marcia | Mr. Garforth |
| 1807 | Cassio | 10th Earl of Strathmore | Crazy | 9th Duke of Hamilton | Priscilla | N. Hodgson |
| 1808 | Archduke colt | Earl of Darlington | Rosette | Mr. Peirse | Rosette | Mr. Peirse |
| 1809 | Theresa | Sir Mark Masterman Sykes | Paulina | 4th Earl Fitzwilliam | Rosette | Mr. Peirse |
| 1810 | Lisette | Mr. Peirse | Whitworth | Mr. Shafto | Mowbray | 6th Duke of Leeds |
| 1811 | Oriana | Sir William Gerard | Ashton | 9th Duke of Hamilton | Mowbray | 6th Duke of Leeds |
| 1812 | Sir Malagigi | Sir Mark Masterman Sykes | Octavian | 6th Duke of Leeds | Mowbray | 6th Duke of Leeds |
| 1813 | Langold | T. Duncombe | Sir Malagigi | Sir Mark Masterman Sykes | Woodman | N. Hodgson |
| 1814 | Prime Minister | Sir Mark Masterman Sykes | Catton | 6th Earl of Scarbrough | Catton | 6th Earl of Scarbrough |
| 1815 | Eborina | Mr. Peirse | Altisidora | Mr. Watts | Catton | 6th Earl of Scarbrough |
| 1816 | Dinmont | Lord Milton | King David | 6th Marquess of Queensberry | Catton | 6th Earl of Scarbrough |
| 1817 | Captain Candid | Mr. Watts | Dinmont | Lord Milton | King David | 6th Marquess of Queensberry |

== Winners 1818–1833 ==
| Year | 4yo race winner | Owner | 4-5yo race winner | Owner | 5yo+ race winner | Owner |
|---|---|---|---|---|---|---|
| 1818 | Blacklock | Richard Watt | Blacklock | Richard Watt | The Duchess | Mr. Lambton |
| 1819 | Reveller | Mr. Peirse | Cambyses | Sir M. Sykes | Blacklock | Richard Watt |
| 1820 | Wrangler | Mr. Peirse | The Juggler | T. O. Powlett | Reveller | Mr. Peirse |
| 1821 | Cora | Mr. Gascoigne | The Black Prince | 6th Earl of Scarbrough | Reveller | Mr. Peirse |
| 1822 | Fortuna | Mr. Lambton | Cora | Mr. Gascoigne | Richard | Mr. Lambton |
| 1823 | Cerberus | Mr. Watt | Dupore | Mr. Watt | Fortuna | Mr. Lambton |
| 1824 | Conductor | O. Powlett | Carnival | Mr. Lambton | Duport | Mr. Watt |
| 1825 | Elizabeth | Mr. Gascoigne | Elizabeth | Mr. Gascoigne | Catton | 6th Earl of Scarbrough |
| 1826 | Actaeon | Viscount of Kelburn | Florismart | Lord Milton | Confederate | Lord Milton |
| 1827 | Mulatto | 4th Earl Fitzwilliam | Mulatto | 4th Earl Fitzwilliam | Actaeon | Viscount of Kelburn |
| 1828 | Moonshine | 6th Duke of Leeds | Lady Georgiana | | Purity | Viscount of Kelburn |
| 1829 | Cambridge | 6th Earl of Scarbrough | Medoro | Lord Milton | Granby | Mr. Petre |
| | no races 1830 |
| 1831 | Maria | Marquess of Cleveland | Rowton | Mr. Petre | Cambridge | 6th Earl of Scarbrough |
| 1832 | Consol | Mr. Walker | Contest | Mr. Houldsworth | Retriever | Viscount of Kelburn |
| 1833 | Voluna | Mr. Walker | Voluna | Mr. Walker | Emancipation | 1st Duke of Cleveland |

== See also ==
- Horseracing in Great Britain
- List of British flat horse races
