= Octavian (horse) =

British-bred Thoroughbred racehorse in the 1800s

- Sire: Stripling
- Grandsire: Phoenomenon
- Dam: Oberon mare
- Damsire: Oberon
- Sex: Stallion
- Foaled: 1807
- Country: United Kingdom
- Colour: Chestnut
- Breeder: Crosier & Allison
- Owner: George Osborne, 6th Duke of Leeds
- Trainer: Frank Jordan
- Record: 9: 7-1-0

Major wins
- St Leger Stakes (1810); Gascoigne Stakes (1810); Great Subscription Purse (1812)

Octavian (1807–1833) was a British Thoroughbred racehorse and sire best known for winning the classic St Leger Stakes in 1810. Despite suffering from hoof problems he was beaten only twice in a nine race career which lasted from April 1810 until September 1812, and which was conducted entirely in Yorkshire. Apart from his classic success, his most important win came in 1812, when he won a division of the Great Subscription Purse at York. He was retired to stud, where he had an early success by siring the St Leger winner Antonio, but his subsequent record was disappointing. Octavian died in 1833 at the age of twenty-six.

== Background ==
Octavian was a chestnut horse bred at Hunmanby near Scarborough in Yorkshire by the partnership of Mr Crosier, a horse dealer, and Mr Allison, a blacksmith. He was the best horse sired by Stripling, a son of the 1783 St Leger winner Phoenomenon. Octavian's dam was an unnamed mare sired by Oberon, who was bought by Allison, from Mr Peverill, a breeder based at Stockton-on-Tees. This mare has been traditionally assigned to Thoroughbred family number 8, but recent research, including analysis of matrilinear MtDNA, has rendered the female side of Octavian's pedigree extremely uncertain.

When still a foal, Octavian was spotted and bought by the Duke of Leeds, who was visiting his estate at Seamer near Scarborough. The Duke put his acquisition into training at his private racing stable, which was under the management of Frank Jordan.

== Racing career ==
=== 1810: three-year-old season ===
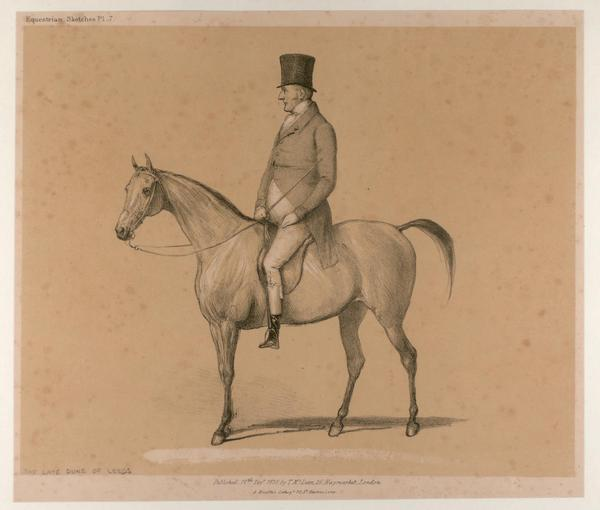
The 6th Duke of Leeds, who bought Octavian after spotting him as a foal

Octavian was unraced as a two-year-old and made his racecourse debut on 26 April 1810 at Catterick Bridge Racecourse. In a two-mile sweepstakes for three-year-olds he finished second of the ten runners behind Sir William Gerard's colt Corduroy. On 26 August, Octavian contested a sweepstakes over one and three quarter miles at York Racecourse. He started the 4/5 favourite and won from Henry Peirse's filly Florette. After the race, Octavian's hooves were found to be so cracked and sore that he was unable to return home and remained at the racecourse for several days.

On 24 September, Octavian was one of eight colts and fillies to contest the thirty-fifth running of the St Leger at Doncaster Racecourse. The Oaks Stakes winner Oriana was made the 11/8 favourite ahead of Major Wheatley's colt Recollection at 7/2, with Octavian starting at odds of 12/1. Despite his month's rest, his hooves were still in a very poor condition and he had to be ridden with care by the veteran jockey Bill Clift. In the straight the race appeared to have developed into a contest between Recollection and Oriana, but Clift produced Octavian with a late challenge to overtake the leader and won easily from Recollection, with Oriana in third place. Two days after his St Leger win, Octavian walked over for the Gascoigne Stakes over the same course, when the six other horses engaged in the race were withdrawn by their owners.

=== 1811: four-year-old season ===
Octavian did not appear as a four-year-old until 19 August, when he contested a sweepstakes over four miles at York. He started at odds of 11/8 and won by two lengths from the six-year-old mare Ceres and the five-year-old Cervantes. In the following month, Octavian returned to Doncaster's St Leger meeting where he finished fourth in the one and a half mile Fitzwilliam Stakes behind Mr Garforth's two-year-old [sic] colt by Camillus (later named Oiseau), and the 1809 St Leger winner Ashton. Three days later, he defeated Ashton and Ceres in a four mile sweepstakes at the same course, winning at odds of 2/1.

=== 1812: five-year-old season ===
Octavian was unbeaten in two races in his third and final season. On 26 August he contested the five-year-olds' division of the Great Subscription Purse at York. He won the race at odds of 4/6, his task having been made somewhat easier when one of his three opponents broke down with an injury and another was handicapped by a broken stirrup. Octavian's last appearance came in a subscription race at Doncaster of 24 September. He started at odds of 5/2 and "won easy" from Sir Malagigi and Amadis de Gaul.

== Stud career ==
In retirement, Octavian remained in the ownership of the Duke of Leeds and stood as a stallion at Oran Farm, near Catterick at an initial fee of six and a half guineas. His second crop of foals included Antonio, a colt who won the St Leger in 1819, and in the same year Octavian's fee rose to twelve guineas. In 1822 Octavian was sold to James Ferguson and moved to his new owners stud at Catterick, where he remained for three years, standing at ten guineas. On 22 December 1825 he was sold to Mr Bradshaw and moved to stand at Houghton Haugh, near Lancaster. Later in his stud career he was sold to a Lancaster wine-merchant named Cox, who gave the horse to Mr Worthington of Ulverston. The last years of Octavian's stud career were not successful and he died in November 1833.

== Pedigree ==
Pedigree of Octavian (GB), chestnut stallion, 1807
Sire Stripling (GB) 1795	Phoenomenon; 1780	Herod*	Tartar
Sire Stripling (GB) 1795	Phoenomenon; 1780	Herod*	Cypron
Sire Stripling (GB) 1795	Phoenomenon; 1780	Frenzy	Eclipse*
Sire Stripling (GB) 1795	Phoenomenon; 1780	Frenzy	Engineer mare
Sire Stripling (GB) 1795	Laura; 1778	Eclipse*	Marske
Sire Stripling (GB) 1795	Laura; 1778	Eclipse*	Spilletta
Sire Stripling (GB) 1795	Laura; 1778	Locust mare	Locust
Sire Stripling (GB) 1795	Laura; 1778	Locust mare	Mother Beecham
Dam Oberon mare (GB)	Oberon; 1790	Highflyer	Herod*
Dam Oberon mare (GB)	Oberon; 1790	Highflyer	Rachel
Dam Oberon mare (GB)	Oberon; 1790	Queen Mab	Eclipse*
Dam Oberon mare (GB)	Oberon; 1790	Queen Mab	Tartar mare
Dam Oberon mare (GB)	sister to Sharper; 1779	Ranthos	Matchem
Dam Oberon mare (GB)	sister to Sharper; 1779	Ranthos	Pratt's Old Mare
Dam Oberon mare (GB)	sister to Sharper; 1779	Sweepstakes mare	Turner's Sweepstakes
Dam Oberon mare (GB)	sister to Sharper; 1779	Sweepstakes mare	sister to Careless (Family 8)

* Octavian is inbred 3S x 4S × 4D to the stallion Eclipse, meaning that he appears third generation and fourth generation on the sire side of his pedigree and fourth generation on the dam side of his pedigree.

* Octavian is inbred 3S x 4D to the stallion Herod, meaning that he appears third generation on the sire side of his pedigree and fourth generation on the dam side of his pedigree.

== Sire line tree ==
- Octavian
  - Antonio
    - Fylde
      - Black Prince
      - Steel
        - Young Steel
      - Tom Thurman
      - Altorf
        - St Louis
  - Stotforth
