= Ashton (horse) =

British-bred Thoroughbred racehorse

- Sire: Walnut or Serpent
- Grandsire: Highflyer
- Dam: Miss Haworth
- Damsire: Spadille
- Sex: Stallion
- Foaled: 1806
- Died: after 1828 (aged 21–22)
- Country: United Kingdom
- Colour: Bay
- Breeder: Archibald Hamilton, 9th Duke of Hamilton
- Owner: Archibald Hamilton, 9th Duke of Hamilton
- Trainer: William Theakston
- Record: 7: 4-3-0

Major wins
- St Leger Stakes (1809); Doncaster Stakes (1809); Great Subscription Purse (1811)

Ashton (1806 – after 1828) was a British Thoroughbred racehorse and sire best known for winning the classic St Leger Stakes in 1809. He was undefeated in three races as a three-year-old in 1809, culminating with his classic victory at Doncaster. After missing the whole of the 1810 season he won a Great Subscription Purse at York on his reappearance as a five-year-old but was beaten in his three remaining races. He was then retired to stud, where he had no success as a sire of winners.

== Background ==
Ashton was a bay horse standing 15.2 hands (62 inches, 157 cm) high bred by his owner Archibald Hamilton, 9th Duke of Hamilton and was the sixth of the Duke's seven St Leger winners. He was described by his owners as "a horse of great bone and strength... with true shape and corresponding action". Henry Hall Dixon was less flattering, describing Ashton as "a hunter-looking horse with very hairy legs".

Ashton was sired by either Walnut or Serpent, meaning that his dam was covered by two stallions in the year of his conception. Walnut, a son of Highflyer, never raced after an accident which left him with a "wasted" foreleg. He sired several other good horses including Constantia, the dam of the St Leger winner Ebor. Serpent, a son of Eclipse, sired no other horses of consequence. Ashton's dam Miss Haworth was a member of Thoroughbred family 29 and therefore closely related to several notable horses including Rowton and Landscape.

== Racing career ==
=== 1809: three-year-old season ===
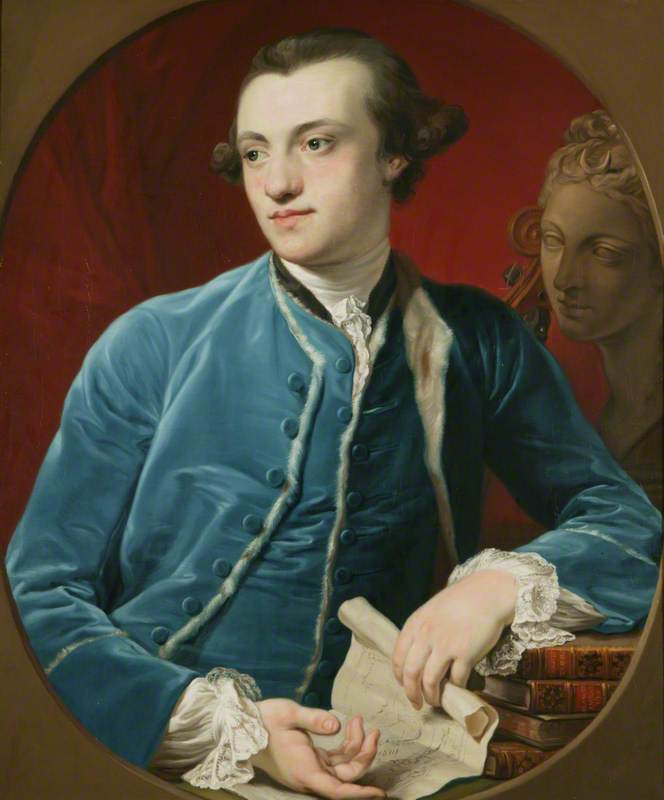
The Duke of Hamilton, who bred and owned Ashton

Ashton was unraced as a two-year-old and made his racecourse debut on 30 May 1809 at York Racecourse. He started the 6/5 favourite for a sweepstakes over one and three quarter miles and won "very easy" from Lord Fitzwilliam's colt Whitenose. In summer he ran a trial race against the stable's 1808 St Leger winner Petronius and finished level with the older horse despite receiving only seven pounds- considerably less than weight-for-age.

After a break of almost four months, Ashton reappeared to contest the thirty-fourth running of the St Leger at Doncaster Racecourse. In a field of fourteen runners he was made the 15/8 favourite ahead of Cervantes on 6/1 and Middlethorpe (also owned by the Duke of Hamilton) on 8/1. Ridden by Ben Smith, he disputed the lead from the start and won the classic easily from Middlethorpe, with Henry Peirse's filly Lisette in third. Two days later Ashton contested the Doncaster Stakes over four miles. Carrying only 84 pounds, he started at odds of 1/4 and completed an unbeaten season by winning from Mr Duncombe's four-year-old filly Ceres.

=== 1811: five-year-old season ===
Ashton missed the whole of the 1810 before returning as a five-year-old at York on 21 August 1811. He started favourite for the five-year-olds' division of the Great Subscription Purse and won from Cervantes, his only opponent. On the following day, he ran in another division of the Great Subscription Purse and started favourite against two six-year-old rivals. He suffered his first defeat as he finished second to the Duke of Leeds' horse Mowbray.

In the following month, Ashton returned to Doncaster's St Leger meeting where he finished second in the one and a half mile Fitzwilliam Stakes behind Mr Garforth's two-year-old [sic] colt by Camillus (later named Oiseau), with the 1810 St Leger winner Octavian in fourth place. Three days later, he was defeated by Octavian in a four mile sweepstakes at the same course, conceding ten pounds to the younger classic winner.

== Stud career ==
Ashton began his stud career at King's Farm, Woodford Wells at a fee of ten guineas. By 1822, he was standing at Michael Grove near Arundel, Sussex at a fee of 8 guineas. In 1823 his fee was reduced to 5 guineas and he was first moved to Mr. Haynes' Livery Stables in Great Portland Street and by 1826 was relocated to Chiselden near Swindon, Wiltshire. He was advertised at the Chiselden location in 1829 but is not mentioned in the 1830 stallion register.

== Pedigree ==
Pedigree of Ashton (GB), bay stallion, 1806
Sire Walnut (GB) 1786	Highflyer*; 1774	Herod*	Tartar
Sire Walnut (GB) 1786	Highflyer*; 1774	Herod*	Cypron
Sire Walnut (GB) 1786	Highflyer*; 1774	Rachel*	Blank
Sire Walnut (GB) 1786	Highflyer*; 1774	Rachel*	Regulus mare
Sire Walnut (GB) 1786	Maiden; 1770	Matchem	Cade
Sire Walnut (GB) 1786	Maiden; 1770	Matchem	sister 2 to Miss Partner
Sire Walnut (GB) 1786	Maiden; 1770	Pratt's old mare	Squirt
Sire Walnut (GB) 1786	Maiden; 1770	Pratt's old mare	Mogul mare
Dam Miss Haworth (GB) 1803	Spadille; 1784	Highflyer*	Herod*
Dam Miss Haworth (GB) 1803	Spadille; 1784	Highflyer*	Rachel*
Dam Miss Haworth (GB) 1803	Spadille; 1784	Flora	Squirrel
Dam Miss Haworth (GB) 1803	Spadille; 1784	Flora	Angelica
Dam Miss Haworth (GB) 1803	Marske mare 1787	Clayhall Marske	Marske
Dam Miss Haworth (GB) 1803	Marske mare 1787	Clayhall Marske	sister to Sejanus
Dam Miss Haworth (GB) 1803	Marske mare 1787	Herod mare	Herod*
Dam Miss Haworth (GB) 1803	Marske mare 1787	Herod mare	Goldfinder mare (Family 29)

* Ashton is inbred 2S x 3D to the stallion Highflyer, meaning that he appears second generation on the sire side of his pedigree and third generation on the dam side of his pedigree.

* Ashton is inbred 3S x 4D x 4D to the stallion Herod, meaning that he appears third generation once on the sire side of his pedigree, and fourth generation twice on the dam side of his pedigree.
