= Ambrosio (horse) =

British Thoroughbred racehorse

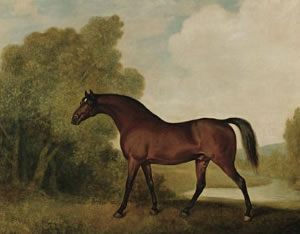
- Ambrosio, a bay stallion, the property of Thomas Haworth by George Stubbs
- Sire: Sir Peter Teazle
- Grandsire: Highflyer
- Dam: Tulip
- Damsire: Damper
- Sex: Stallion
- Foaled: 1793
- Country: Kingdom of Great Britain
- Colour: Bay
- Breeder: J Lowther
- Owner: Joseph Cookson
- Trainer: Frank Neale
- Record: 23: 15–3–3

Major wins
- St Leger Stakes (1796); Oatlands Stakes (1797, 1798, 1798); Match against Lop (1797); Jockey Club Plate (1798); Great Subscription Purse (1799); Match against Wonder (1799)

Ambrosio (foaled 1793) was a British Thoroughbred racehorse and sire best known for winning the classic St Leger Stakes in 1796. In a racing career which lasted from May 1796 until September 1799 he won fifteen of his twenty-three races. As a three-year-old he was based in Yorkshire, where he won his first three races before justifying his position as odds-on favourite for the St Leger, beating six opponents. In the next two years he competed mainly at Newmarket, where his victories three divisions of the Oatlands Stakes and the Jockey Club Plate. He returned to Yorkshire as a six-year-old to win a division of the Great Subscription Purse at York before being retired to stud. Ambrosio stood as a breeding stallion in Great Britain and Ireland, but had little success as a sire of winners.

== Background ==
Ambrosio was a bay horse with a small white sire bred by J Lowther. His sire, Sir Peter Teazle (or simply "Sir Peter") won The Derby in 1787 and became the most successful stallion of the time, winning the title of Champion sire on ten occasions between 1799 and 1809. Ambrosio was the second foal of his dam, Tulip, an influential broodmare whose other descendants included the Derby winner Pyrrhus the First and the 1000 Guineas winner Galantine.

== Racing career ==
=== 1796: three-year-old season ===
Ambrosio made his first appearance at York Racecourse on 27 May, when he ran in a weight-for-age sweepstakes run in a series of ten furlong heats, with the prize going to the first horse to win twice. He finished fourth in the first heat, but won the next two. Following this race he was sold by Lowther to James Cookson. He made his first appearance for his new owner at York in August, when he won a two-mile sweepstakes from Giles Crompton's colt Cardinal and a similar race three days later.

On 27 September, Ambrosio was one of seven three-year-olds to contest the twenty-first running of the St Leger Stakes over two miles at Doncaster Racecourse. Ridden by John Jackson, he started the 4/5 favourite and won the classic from Cardinal, with Rosolio in third place. On the following day he was matched against older horses in the four-mile Gold Cup and finished third behind the four-year-olds Hambletonian and Sober Robin. In October, Ambrosio was sent south to contest a division of the Oatlands Stakes at Newmarket Racecourse and finished third of the seven runners behind Cub and Little Devil.

=== 1797: four-year-old season ===
In 1797, Ambrosio was moved to compete in the south of England and began his season at the Craven meeting at Newmarket Racecourse in April. He started the 7/4 favourite for the first class of the Oatlands Stakes, a handicap race over the two-mile "Ditch-In" course and won from Stickler, Gabriel and five other. Two days later, running over the same course and distance, he was beaten in a 300 guinea match race by Little Devil, to whom he was conceding three and a half pounds. The next Newmarket meeting two weeks later saw him finish third to John Lade's colt in the main class of the Oatlands Stakes. At the Second Spring meeting in May Ambrosio ran a match race against Lord Clermont's Spoliator over the last three miles of the four-mile Beacon Course. The race ended in a dead heat, allowing each owner to reclaim his 300 guinea stake. At Oxford in July he finished unplaced behind Stickler in the local Gold Cup over a distance of four miles. Ambrosio returned to Newmarket in October when he finished second to the filly Doubtful in a sweepstakes before winning a 200 guinea match race against Mr Howorth's six-year-old Lop.

=== 1798: five-year-old season ===
Ambrosio began his five-year-old season (when he raced exclusively at Newmarket) at the Craven meeting on 11 April when he won the third class of the Oatlands Stakes from Sir Frank Standish's four-year-old Stamford, the beaten favourite in the previous year's Derby and St Leger. This race marked the second and final racecourse appearance of the Colt by Fidget who finished last of the seven runners At the next Newmarket meeting on 24 April, Ambrosio won the main class of the Oatlands Stakes, beating Stamford and Stickler under top weight of 121 pounds. At the Second Spring meeting in May, Ambrosio had three engagements, but raced only once. Cookson claimed forfeits when Ambrosio's opponents were withdrawn from a sweepstakes over the Duke's Course and received a 50 guinea "compromise" from Lord Clermont, who declined to run his horses Aimator and Spoliator against Cookson's Diamond and Ambrosio. In the Jockey Club Plate, a four-mile race restricted to horses owned by members of the Jockey Club, Ambrosio started odds-on favourite and won from St George, Aimator and Centinel.

After a summer break, Ambrosio returned at the First October meeting where he defeated St George and Aimator in a 200 guinea sweepstakes over the Beacon Course. Later at the same meeting he finished fifth of the six runners, when favourite for a subscription race over two miles. He ended his season at the Second October meeting when he successfully conceded ten pounds to John Lade's horse Oatlands in a 200 guinea match race.

=== 1799: six-year-old season ===
Ambrosio began his six-year-old season by finishing unplaced behind Oscar in the second class of the Oatlands Stakes at the Craven meeting. He was withdrawn from an Oatlands Stakes at the First Spring meeting, running instead in a subscription race over the Round Course which he won from Johnny and Spoliator.

In August, Ambrosio raced in the north of England for the first time since his three-year-old season when he contested a division of the Great Subscription Purse at York. He was made the 8/13 favourite and won from Mr Wentworth's six-year-old Harry Rowe. In September he returned to the scene of his classic victory for two 200 guinea match races at the Doncaster St Leger meeting. He was beaten by Sir Thomas Gascoigne's Timothy, but ended his career with a win later the same afternoon, when he successfully conceded nine pounds to Lord Fitzwilliam's Wonder.

== Stud career ==
After his retirement from racing, Ambrosio became a breeding stallion at Woburn, Bedfordshire, Bedfordshire in the ownership of Thomas Haworth. By 1803 he had moved to Barham Wood, near Elstree in Hertfordshire where he stood at a fee of ten guineas and was being advertised as "the best son of Sir Peter". In 1804, at the age of eleven, he was the subject of an equine portrait by George Stubbs, which fetched $206,500 when auctioned at Sotheby's in New York City in 2008. He remained at Barham Wood until at least 1809, with his stud fee remaining constant at 10 guineas. Ambrosio was then moved to Wood-Park, County Armagh in Ireland, where he stood at a fee of eight guineas. He appears to have had little impact as a stallion although he was the damsire of the July Stakes winner The Mummer.

== Pedigree ==
Pedigree of Ambrosio (GB), bay stallion, 1793
Sire Sir Peter Teazle (GB) 1784	Highflyer; 1774	Herod	Tartar
Sire Sir Peter Teazle (GB) 1784	Highflyer; 1774	Herod	Cypron
Sire Sir Peter Teazle (GB) 1784	Highflyer; 1774	Rachel	Blank*
Sire Sir Peter Teazle (GB) 1784	Highflyer; 1774	Rachel	Regulus mare^
Sire Sir Peter Teazle (GB) 1784	Papillon; 1769	Snap	Snip
Sire Sir Peter Teazle (GB) 1784	Papillon; 1769	Snap	sister to Slipby
Sire Sir Peter Teazle (GB) 1784	Papillon; 1769	Miss Cleveland	Regulus^
Sire Sir Peter Teazle (GB) 1784	Papillon; 1769	Miss Cleveland	Midge
Dam Tulip (GB) 1783	Damper; 1769	Spectator	Crab
Dam Tulip (GB) 1783	Damper; 1769	Spectator	Partner mare
Dam Tulip (GB) 1783	Damper; 1769	Nancy	Blank*
Dam Tulip (GB) 1783	Damper; 1769	Nancy	Fancy
Dam Tulip (GB) 1783	Eclipse mare 1775	Eclipse	Marske
Dam Tulip (GB) 1783	Eclipse mare 1775	Eclipse	Spilletta^
Dam Tulip (GB) 1783	Eclipse mare 1775	Rarity	Matchem
Dam Tulip (GB) 1783	Eclipse mare 1775	Rarity	Snapdragon (Family:3-a)

* Ambrosio is inbred 4S x 4D to the stallion Blank, meaning that he appears fourth generation on the sire side of his pedigree and fourth generation on the dam side of his pedigree.

^ Ambrosio is inbred 5S x 4S x 5D to the stallion Regulus, meaning that he appears fifth and fourth generation once each on the sire side of his pedigree and fifth generation once on the dam side of his pedigree.
