= Charlie Spares =

British jockey

Charles Spares
Personal information
- Born: 1917 Upton-upon-Severn, Worcestershire
- Died: 29 October 1958 (aged 40–41) Middleham, Yorkshire
- Occupation: Jockey

Horse racing career
- Sport: Horse racing

Major racing wins
- British Classic Race wins: Epsom Derby (1951); Other major wins: Sussex Stakes (1953); November Handicap (1944)

Significant horses
- Arctic Prince

Charles William Reginald Spares (1917 – 29 October 1958), also commonly known as Chuck Spares, was a British jockey. Although predominantly a National Hunt jockey, his biggest victory came on the flat, when he won the 1951 Epsom Derby on Arctic Prince.

== Career ==
Charlie Spares was born in 1917 in Upton-upon-Severn, and became apprentice jockey to trainer Len Cundell at Chilton, Berkshire, riding his first victory on Penny-a-Liner at Birmingham Racecourse on 31 October 1932. In 1936, he switched codes to ride over hurdles. He gained a big victory on the flat in the 1944 November Handicap on Kerry Piper and also won the final race run in wartime Britain - on a horse called Wisecrack in a maiden race at Stockton on 1 September 1945, the evening before the Japanese surrender.

After the war, he rode initially for Ernie Davey's stable in Malton, Yorkshire, and then for Willie Stephenson in Royston, Hertfordshire, for whom he rode under both codes. For Stephenson, he won the biggest race of career when he rode Arctic Prince in the Epsom Derby, winning at odds of 28/1 in a field of thirty-three.

In the race, the favourite, Ki Ming, disputed the lead with Mystery IX as the field approached Tattenham Corner, at which point Arctic Prince was still moving through the field. Arctic Prince overtook Mystery IX to take the lead early in the straight and pulled clear to win by six lengths from Sybil's Nephew for what was reported to be "one of the easiest triumphs in the recent history of the race." Spares explained that "I took the lead and then it was all over." With a total prize of £22,625, it was the most valuable race ever run in England at the time.

The following year was numerically Spares' most successful, winning 21 winners from 193 rides, and in 1953 he won the Sussex Stakes on King Of The Tudors. However, his association with Stephenson ended the same year, his health began to fail and he quit riding. A comeback in the spring of 1958, with the support of trainer Harry Blackshaw in Middleham, was unsuccessful, and he died there, aged 41, on 28 October 1958. He left a widow and three sons, one of whom, also known as Chuck, was a racehorse trainer, best known for training Ascot Hurdle winner Ibn Majed.

== Major wins ==
(United Kingdom) Great Britain

- Epsom Derby - Arctic Prince (1951)
- Sussex Stakes - King Of The Tudors (1953)

== See also ==
- List of jockeys

== Bibliography ==
- Mortimer, Roger; Onslow, Richard; Willett, Peter (1978). Biographical Encyclopaedia of British Racing. London: Macdonald and Jane's. ISBN 0-354-08536-0.
- Wright, Howard (1986). The Encyclopaedia of Flat Racing. London: Robert Hale. ISBN 0-7090-2639-0.
- Tanner, Michael; Cranham, Gerry (1992). Great Jockeys of the Flat. Enfield, Middlesex: Guinness Publishing. ISBN 0-85112-989-7.
- Saville, John (2009). Insane and Unseemly. Troubadour Publishing. ISBN 9781848760349.
