= Spāre Station =

Railway station in Latvia

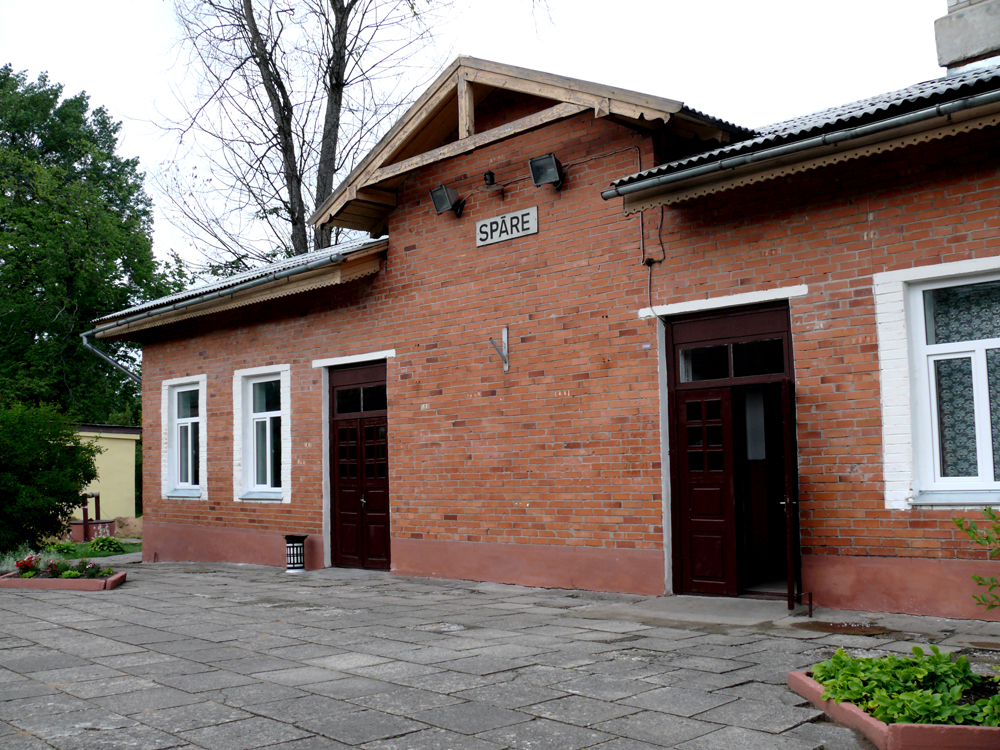
- Station building

General information
- Location: Spāre village, Ģibuļi parish, Talsi Municipality, Latvia
- Coordinates: 57°12′56.73″N 22°15′52.88″E
- Platforms: 1
- Tracks: 6

History
- Opened: 1901
Location

Spāre Station is a railway station on the Ventspils I – Tukums II Railway.
