= Ki Ming =

Irish-bred Thoroughbred racehorse

- Sire: Ballyogan
- Grandsire: Fair Trial
- Dam: Ulster Lily
- Damsire: Apron
- Sex: Stallion
- Foaled: 1948
- Country: Ireland
- Colour: Brown
- Breeder: J C Sullivan
- Owner: Ley On
- Trainer: John Beary; Michael Beary
- Record: 8: 3-1-0

Major wins
- Duke of Edinburgh Stakes (1950); 2000 Guineas (1951); Diadem Stakes (1951)

Awards
- Timeform rating: 134

Ki Ming (1948–1957) was an Irish-bred British-trained Thoroughbred racehorse and sire best known for winning the classic 2000 Guineas in 1951. As a two-year-old he showed promise to win at Royal Ascot but his season was disrupted when his trainer was banned for a doping offence. At three, he recorded an upset win over a large field to win the Guineas but failed when favourite for The Derby. In autumn he returned to sprint distances and won the Diadem Stakes at Ascot. His record as a breeding stallion was very disappointing.

== Background ==
Ki Ming was a very large brown horse with a white star and snip and white socks on his hind legs standing 17 hands high. He was bred at the Kilberry Stud near Navan in County Meath, Ireland by John C Sullivan. He was sired by Ballyogan, an Irish horse who excelled over sprint distances. The best of his other offspring Sixpence, a filly who won the Cheveley Park Stakes in 1953. Ki Ming's dam Ulster Lily was a daughter of a mare named The Beggar, making her a half-sister of the Lincolnshire Handicap winner Over Coat, the Stewards' Cup winner Poor Lad and Ballywellbroke, the granddam of Montaval.

When Sullivan died in 1949, Ki Ming was sent as a foal to the sales at Dublin where he was bought for 370 guineas by Tim Hyde. In the following year, the yearling was offered for sale at Newmarket and bought for 760 guineas by the trainer John Beary. The colt then entered the ownership of the Chinese-born restaurateur Billy Ley On and was trained by Beary at East Hendred in Berkshire.

== Racing career ==
=== 1950: two-year-old season ===
Before Ki Ming had appeared on a racecourse, Ley On had backed him to win the 1951 Derby at odds of 1000/1. As a two-year-old, the colt looked a good prospect when winning the Duke of Edinburgh Stakes over five furlongs at Royal Ascot.

In October 1950, Joyeuse, a mare trained by John Beary failed a drug test after finishing unplaced in a minor race at Lingfield Park Racecourse. Under the rules of racing at the time, the Jockey Club had no option but to withdraw Beary's license to train. Ki Ming was moved to the Wantage stable of John Beary's older brother Michael Beary, best known for successes as a jockey in the 1930s when he won the Derby on Mid-day Sun.

=== 1951: three-year-old season ===
On 2 May 1951 Ki Ming was one of twenty-seven colts to contest the 143rd running over the Rowley Mile course at Newmarket. He was ridden by the thirty-six-year-old Australian jockey Scobie Breasley who had arrived in Britain in the previous. He started at odds of 100/8 and won by one and a half lengths and a short head from Stokes and Malka's Boy. A month later Ki Ming was moved up in distance for the Derby over one and a half miles at Epsom Downs Racecourse. Although his pedigree suggested that he would be unlikely to stay the distance he was made favourite against thirty-two opponents. He ran prominently until the turn into the straight but then tired and finished unplaced behind Arctic Prince. As Breasley honoured a previous agreement to partner Expeditious, the colt was ridden by T Gosling who reported: "He blew up. I thought that as the pace was so slow he would be sure to stay on, but he went in a second". Ki Ming returned to one mile at Royal Ascot and finished second to Neron. In the following month he was again tried over one and a half miles and finished unplaced behind Supreme Court.

In Autumn Ki Ming was brought back in distance for the Diadem Stakes over six furlongs at Ascot. Ridden again by Breasley he defeated the Nunthorpe Stakes winner Royal Serenade to end his season with a victory.

== Assessment ==
In 1951, the independent Timeform organisation gave Ki Ming a rating of 134, one pound behind the top three-year-old colts Arctic Prince, Sicambre and Supreme Court. In their book, A Century of Champions, based on the Timeform rating system, John Randall and Tony Morris rated Ki Ming an "average" winner of the 2000 Guineas.

== Stud record ==
Ki Ming was retired to stud but proved to be a complete failure as a stallion, showing little interest in the mares presented to him. He sired very few foals and died in 1957 at the age of nine.

== Pedigree ==
Pedigree of Ki Ming (IRE), bay stallion 1948
Sire Ballyogan (GB) 1939	Fair Trial (GB); 1932	Fairway	Phalaris
Sire Ballyogan (GB) 1939	Fair Trial (GB); 1932	Fairway	Scapa Flow
Sire Ballyogan (GB) 1939	Fair Trial (GB); 1932	Lady Juror	Son-in-Law
Sire Ballyogan (GB) 1939	Fair Trial (GB); 1932	Lady Juror	Lady Josephine
Sire Ballyogan (GB) 1939	Serial (GB); 1932	Solario	Gainsborough
Sire Ballyogan (GB) 1939	Serial (GB); 1932	Solario	Sun Worship
Sire Ballyogan (GB) 1939	Serial (GB); 1932	Booktalk	Buchan
Sire Ballyogan (GB) 1939	Serial (GB); 1932	Booktalk	Tete-a-Tete
Dam Ulster Lily (GB) 1930	Apron (GB); 1920	Son-in-Law	Dark Ronald
Dam Ulster Lily (GB) 1930	Apron (GB); 1920	Son-in-Law	Mother in Law
Dam Ulster Lily (GB) 1930	Apron (GB); 1920	Aprille	Chaucer
Dam Ulster Lily (GB) 1930	Apron (GB); 1920	Aprille	Japonica
Dam Ulster Lily (GB) 1930	The Beggar (GB); 1916	Le Souvenir	Le Sancy
Dam Ulster Lily (GB) 1930	The Beggar (GB); 1916	Le Souvenir	Sylphine
Dam Ulster Lily (GB) 1930	The Beggar (GB); 1916	Avonbeg	Queen's Birthday
Dam Ulster Lily (GB) 1930	The Beggar (GB); 1916	Avonbeg	Avoca (Family: 9)

- Ki Ming was inbred 3 x 4 to Son-in-Law, meaning that this stallion appear in both the third and fourth generations of his pedigree.
