= Cockfighter (horse) =

British Thoroughbred racehorse

- Sire: Overton
- Grandsire: King Fergus
- Dam: Palmflower
- Damsire: Weasel
- Sex: Stallion
- Foaled: 1796
- Country: Kingdom of Great Britain
- Colour: Brown
- Owner: J. Robinson; Sir Henry Vane-Tempest, 2nd Baronet
- Trainer: Tom Fields
- Record: 18:10-5-2

Major wins
- Richmond Gold Cup (1799); St Leger Stakes (1799); Doncaster Cup (1799); York Oatlands Stakes (1800); Great Subscription Purse (1800, 1801, 1801); Craven Stakes (1802)

Cockfighter (1796–1807) was a British Thoroughbred racehorse and sire best known for winning the classic St Leger Stakes in 1799. In a racing career which lasted from May 1799 until August 1802 he won ten of his eighteen races. Originally named Abraham Newland, he was renamed to reflect the sporting interests of Henry Tempest Vane who bought the horse in the summer of his three-year-old season. After bolting on his racecourse debut, Cockfighter was undefeated for more than two years, winning the St Leger, the Doncaster Cup, and three divisions of the Great Subscription Purse at York, and was regarded as the best horse in Northern England. He won the Craven Stakes in 1802, but was retired from racing after a run of defeats later that year. He had little opportunity to establish himself as a breeding stallion, dying in 1807 after four seasons at stud.

== Background ==
Cockfighter was a bay or brown horse bred by his first owner Mr J Robinson. He was the most successful horse sired by Overton, a son of King Fergus, who won the Doncaster Cup in 1792. His dam, Palmflower, came from the same branch of Thoroughbred family 2 which included The Derby winners Spread Eagle and Didelot. The colt was originally named Abraham Newland, after the chief cashier of the Bank of England, whose name had also become a slang term for a bank note.

== Racing career ==
=== 1799: three-year-old season ===
Abraham Newland made his first appearance at York Racecourse on 29 May when he ran in a two-mile, all-aged sweepstakes. He did not finish the race after he "ran out of the course". Two days later he was entered in another sweepstakes over the same course which was run in a series of heats, with the prize going to the first horse to win twice. Abraham Newland finished second to Mr Wentworth's five-year-old Tartar in the first heat, but won the next two. On the following day a cockfight was held in which the birds owned by Sir Harry Tempest Vane (otherwise known as Sir Henry Vane-Tempest) defeated those of George Germain, earning their owner over 300 guineas. Shortly afterwards, Tempest Vane purchased Abraham Newland and renamed him Cockfighter.

Cockfighter's first appearance for his new owner came on 4 September at Richmond Racecourse. He started the 7/4 favourite for the four mile Richmond Gold Cup and won from Baron Nile, a grey colt owned by Mr Alderson. On 24 September, Cockfighter was one of seven colts to contest the twenty-fourth running of the St Leger over two miles at Doncaster Racecourse. Ridden by his trainer Tom Fields, he started the 4/6 favourite and won from Mr Cookson's colt Expectation, with Sir Thomas Gascoigne's brother to Symmetry in third place. On the following afternoon, Cockfighter ran in the weight-for-age Doncaster Cup over four miles in which his opponents included the 1798 St Leger winner Symmetry. Cockfighter started the 4/7 favourite and won from Expectation and Symmetry. The Sunday after the St. Leger, Tempest Vane reportedly rode Cockfighter as a hack through Hyde Park, which attracted some notoriety as the horse was deemed valuable.

=== 1800: four-year-old season ===
Cockfighter began his four-year-old season at York in August. He did not have to race on the Saturday of the meeting when Mr Graham's horse Bryan O'Lynn was withdrawn from a match race, allowing Tempest Vane to collect a forfeit of 250 guineas. Two days later Cockfighter won the York Oatlands Stakes, beating Wonder and Sir Harry over two miles. On the Friday of the meeting, Cockfighter contested the four-year-olds' division of the Great Subscription Purse over four miles. He lost a great deal of ground after bolting during the race, but recovered to win from Mr Pierse's grey filly Constantia.

At Doncaster in September, Cockfighter bypassed the Doncaster Cup to run in the Doncaster Stakes over the same course. He started at odds of 1/10 and won from his only opponent, a three-year-old colt named Hyacinthus.

=== 1801: five-year-old season ===
In 1801, Cockfighter was scheduled to begin his season with a match against Warter at the Newmarket Craven meeting in April, but his opponent failed to appear, allowing Tempest Vane to claim 500 guineas in forfeit. Cockfighter's first competitive races of the season came at York in August, where he contested two of the three divisions of the Great Subscription Purse. In the five-year-olds' division he repeated his performance in the previous year's race for four-year-olds as he defeated Constantia. On the following day he contested the division of the Purse for older horses and won from Mr Baker's six-year-old Jonah and five others. Cockfighter had won his last nine competitive races and was regarded as the champion of the North, by the time he appeared at the St Leger meeting at Doncaster, where he had two engagements. On 19 September he lost for the first time in over two years when he was defeated by Mr Johnson's horse Sir Solomon in a match race over four miles at level weights. The match had created immense interest, and £50,000 was wagered on the result. Four days later, Cockfighter started the odds-on favourite for the Doncaster Stakes, but finished third of the four runners behind Chance, a four-year-old colt owned by Mr Wentworth.

=== 1802: six-year-old season ===
Cockfighter began his last racing season on 19 April at Newmarket, where he was made favourite for the Craven Stakes, a weight-for-age race over ten furlongs ("across the flat"). He won the race from Lucan, brother to Magic and Teddy the Grinder, in what proved to be his final success. Three days later he was beaten when attempting to concede four pounds to Warter in a sweepstakes over the Rowley Mile course. At the next Newmarket meeting in May, Cockfighter finished ahead of Warter when running second to Lignum Vitae in a King's Plate over the Round Course. Two weeks later, he was made 1/3 favourite for the Jockey Club Plate, but was beaten by the 1801 St Leger winner Quiz. Cockfighter ended his racing career at York in August 1802. He finished third to Haphazard and Chance when carrying top weight of 121 pounds in a four mile handicap race, and was beaten by Sir Solomon in the older horses' division of the Great Subscription Purse.

== Stud career ==
Cockfighter was retired from racing to become a breeding stallion, beginning his stud career at Brompton, near Catterick at a fee of three guineas for "blood mares" and one and a half guineas for "country mares". For the 1806 season he was moved to stand at Middlethorpe with his fee rising to five guineas a year later. The best of his progeny was probably Gilliver, a colt who won the Fitzwilliam Stakes at Doncaster in 1809. Cockfighter died in 1807 at the age of eleven.

== Pedigree ==
Pedigree of Cockfighter (GB), brown stallion, 1796
Sire Overton (GB) 1788	King Fergus; 1775	Eclipse*	Marske
Sire Overton (GB) 1788	King Fergus; 1775	Eclipse*	Spilletta
Sire Overton (GB) 1788	King Fergus; 1775	Creeping Polly	Portmore's Othello
Sire Overton (GB) 1788	King Fergus; 1775	Creeping Polly	Fanny*^
Sire Overton (GB) 1788	Herod mare 1774	Herod*	Tartar*
Sire Overton (GB) 1788	Herod mare 1774	Herod*	Cypron*
Sire Overton (GB) 1788	Herod mare 1774	Snip mare	Snip
Sire Overton (GB) 1788	Herod mare 1774	Snip mare	sister to Regulus
Dam Palmflower 1787	Weasel; 1776	Herod*	Tartar*
Dam Palmflower 1787	Weasel; 1776	Herod*	Cypron*
Dam Palmflower 1787	Weasel; 1776	Eclipse mare	Eclipse*
Dam Palmflower 1787	Weasel; 1776	Eclipse mare	Brilliant mare
Dam Palmflower 1787	Columba; 1780	Alfred	Matchem
Dam Palmflower 1787	Columba; 1780	Alfred	Snap mare
Dam Palmflower 1787	Columba; 1780	Engineer mare (1770)	Engineer
Dam Palmflower 1787	Columba; 1780	Engineer mare (1770)	Regulus mare (Family 2)

* Cockfighter is inbred 3S x 3D to the stallion Herod, meaning that he appears third generation on the sire side of his pedigree and third generation on the dam side of his pedigree.

* Cockfighter is inbred 3S x 4D to the stallion Eclipse, meaning that he appears third generation on the sire side of his pedigree and fourth generation on the dam side of his pedigree.

*^ Cockfighter is inbred 5S x 4S x 4D to the stallion Tartar, meaning that he appears fifth generation (via Fanny)^ and fourth generation on the sire side of his pedigree and fourth generation on the dam side of his pedigree.
