= Remembrancer (horse) =

British-bred Thoroughbred racehorse

- Sire: Pipator
- Grandsire: Imperator
- Dam: Queen Mab
- Damsire: Eclipse
- Sex: Stallion
- Foaled: 1800
- Country: Kingdom of Great Britain
- Colour: Bay
- Breeder: John Bowes, 10th Earl of Strathmore and Kinghorne
- Owner: John Bowes, 10th Earl of Strathmore and Kinghorne
- Trainer: John Smith
- Record: 14: 9-4-0 (not including void race)
- Earnings: 2070 guineas

Major wins
- Newcastle Gold Cup (1803, 1804); St Leger Stakes (1803); Doncaster Cup (1803); Great Subscription Purse (1804)

Remembrancer (1800–1829) was a British Thoroughbred racehorse and sire best known for winning the classic St Leger Stakes in 1803. Bred and trained in County Durham, he was still unnamed when winning six races including the St Leger and the Doncaster Cup as a three-year-old, and was undefeated in four starts in 1804, including a division of the Great Subscription Purse at York Racecourse. He remained in training as a five-year-old, but had injury problems and failed to win. At stud, he was moderately successful as a sire of racehorses, but had a lasting impact on the breed through the success of his daughters as broodmares.

== Background ==
Remembrancer was a bay horse bred by his owner John Bowes, 10th Earl of Strathmore and Kinghorne at Streatlam Castle in County Durham. His sire Pipator was a useful, but unremarkable racehorse who sired several good runners and broodmares. Remembrancer's dam, Queen Mab was a highly influential broodmare with many successful racehorses among her direct descendants, including Hill Prince, Indian Skimmer, King's Theatre and Henrythenavigator.

== Racing career ==
=== 1803: three-year-old season ===
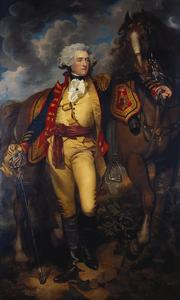
The 10th Earl of Strathmore, who bred and owned Remembrancer.

Until 1913, there was no requirement for British racehorses to have official names, and the horse who later became known as Remembrancer competed in 1803 as Lord Strathmore's b. c. by Pipator out of Queen Mab.

Lord Strathmore's colt began his racing career on 13 April 1803 at Catterick Bridge Racecourse in Yorkshire where he had three engagements. In the opening race of the day he started 2/1 second favourite for a two-mile sweepstakes and won from Mr Hutton's chestnut colt (later named Saxoni). Later that afternoon he walked over for a 100 guinea match against Hutton's colt over the same distance, although the race was later declared void. Lord Strathmore then claimed another 100 guineas when Lord Darlington's bay colt failed to appear for a scheduled match against his the son of Pipator.

In June, Lord Strathmore's colt ran in two races at Newcastle Racecourse in Northumberland. On the opening day he was made 1/3 favourite for a two-mile sweepstakes, but was beaten by William Walker's bay colt by Screveton. Three days later, Strathmore's colt was matched against older horses in the Newcastle Gold Cup over four miles, and won from three opponents. The colt next appeared at York Racecourse in August, where he upset the odds-on favourite Doncaster (owned by Lord Darlington) in a two-mile sweepstakes for three-year-olds. Two days later, the Strathmore's colt, finished second to Doncaster, but ahead of William Walker's colt, when the three met in a sweepstakes over one and three quarter miles at the same venue.

On his next appearance, Strathmore's colt ran at Richmond Racecourse on 7 September, when he was beaten by Saxoni in a sweepstakes. On 27 September, Strathmore's colt was one of a field of eight runners to contest the twenty-eighth running of the St Leger over two miles at Doncaster. His rivals included Lord Grey's bay colt and Sir Frank Standish's brother to Stamford, horses which had finished second and third to Ditto in The Derby. Ridden by Ben Smith, Strathmore's colt started 5/2 favourite and won from Macmanus, with Lord Grey's colt in third place. On the following afternoon the Leger winner ran in the four mile Gold Cup and won the weight-for-age contest from Mr Garforth's bay colt and two others. The colt earned a total of 1475 guineas for his owner in 1803.

=== 1804: four-year-old season ===
Lord Strathmore's colt, now officially named Remembrancer was undefeated in four races in the 1804 season. He made his first appearance of the year on 21 June in the Newcastle Gold Cup. He won the race for the second time, beating Mr Brandling's six-year-old Alonzo and two others. In August, Remembrancer made two appearances at York, both over a distance of four miles. He began by winning the Gold Cup from Mr Bowman's filly Susan, and three days later won division of the Great Subscription Purse, beating Mr Peirse's bay colt (later named Ferguson), with Doncaster in third. Remembrancer made his final appearance at Pontefract Racecourse on 11 September. He won a four-mile sweepstakes in which he conceded twenty-five pounds to a three-year-old named Sir Charles, his only opponent.

=== 1805: five-year-old season ===
Remembrancer's final season was disappointing and affected by injury. He began his season at York in August where he started odds-on favourite for a division of the Great Subscription, but broke down injured in finishing second to Ferguson. His final appearance came in the Doncaster Cup of 25 September. He was not fancied in the betting and showed none of his old form, finishing unplaced behind Lord Fitzwilliam's Caleb Quotem.

== Stud career ==
Remembrancer was retired from racing to his at his owner's stud at Streatlam Castle. He began his breeding career in 1806 at a fee of five guineas, with five shillings for the groom. His fee rose to eight guineas in 1808, and to ten guineas in 1810. Remembrancer moved to "the neighborhood of Northallerton" in 1811 and to Boroughbridge a year later, before returning to Streatlam Castle for the 1816 season. After this time he appears to have produced few more foals and his name ceased to appear in the lists of stallion advertisements. Remembrancer died on 3 February 1829 at the age of twenty-nine. Remembrancer sired several good racehorses including the Craven Stakes winner Recordon, but had his greatest success as a sire of broodmares. His most enduring influence came through an unnamed "Remembrancer mare" foaled in 1807, who became the Foundation mare of Thoroughbred family 8-f. Her direct, female-line descendants have won many important races throughout the nineteenth, twentieth and twenty-first centuries including the British Classic winners Nijinsky, El Gran Senor and The Minstrel as well as the notable North American runners Blue Larkspur, Birdstone, Rags to Riches.

== Sire line tree ==
- Remembrancer
  - Recordon
    - Welcome
      - Sir William
  - Queensberry
    - Robin

== Pedigree ==
Pedigree of Remembrancer (GB), bay stallion, 1800
Sire Pipator (GB) 1786	Imperator; 1776	Conductor	Matchem
Sire Pipator (GB) 1786	Imperator; 1776	Conductor	Snap mare
Sire Pipator (GB) 1786	Imperator; 1776	Herod mare	Herod
Sire Pipator (GB) 1786	Imperator; 1776	Herod mare	Carina
Sire Pipator (GB) 1786	Brunette; 1771	Squirrel	Traveller
Sire Pipator (GB) 1786	Brunette; 1771	Squirrel	Grey Bloody Buttocks
Sire Pipator (GB) 1786	Brunette; 1771	Dove	Matchless
Sire Pipator (GB) 1786	Brunette; 1771	Dove	Starling mare
Dam Queen Mab (GB) 1785	Eclipse; 1764	Marske	Squirt
Dam Queen Mab (GB) 1785	Eclipse; 1764	Marske	The Ruby Mare
Dam Queen Mab (GB) 1785	Eclipse; 1764	Spilletta	Regulus
Dam Queen Mab (GB) 1785	Eclipse; 1764	Spilletta	Mother Western
Dam Queen Mab (GB) 1785	Tartar mare 1757	Tartar	Croft's Partner
Dam Queen Mab (GB) 1785	Tartar mare 1757	Tartar	Meliora
Dam Queen Mab (GB) 1785	Tartar mare 1757	sister to Mogul mare	Mogul
Dam Queen Mab (GB) 1785	Tartar mare 1757	sister to Mogul mare	Sweepstakes mare (Family:9-b)
