= Quiz (horse) =

British Thoroughbred racehorse

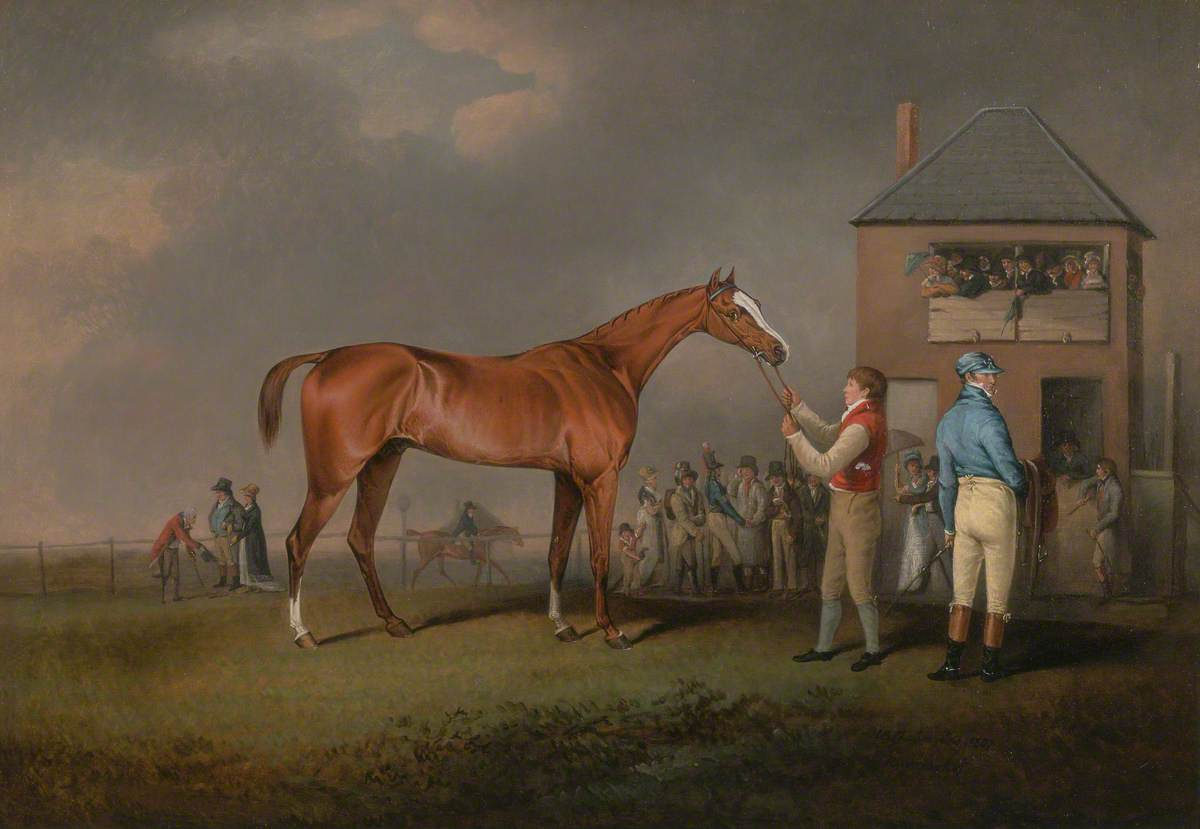
- Quiz, After His Last Race at Newmarket, by Henry Bernard Chalon
- Sire: Buzzard
- Grandsire: Woodpecker
- Dam: Miss West
- Damsire: Matchem
- Sex: Stallion
- Foaled: 1798
- Country: Kingdom of Great Britain
- Colour: Chestnut
- Breeder: Henry Goodricke
- Owner: Gilbert Crompton; Francis Dawson; Francis Neale; Lord Rous
- Trainer: George Searle
- Record: 36: 21-7-2

Major wins
- St Leger Stakes (1801); Jockey Club Plate (1802); Brocket-Hall Gold Cup (1802, 1803, 1804); King's Plate at York (1802); Great Subscription Purse (1802); Match against Highland Fling (1803); Oatlands Stakes (1803, 1806); Surrey Yeoman's Plate (1805); Reading Gold Cup (1805); Abingdon Members' Purse (1805)

Quiz (1798–1826) was a British Thoroughbred racehorse and sire best known for winning the classic St Leger Stakes in 1801. Quiz was a durable, top-class performer, winning at least once a year in racing career which lasted seven seasons from August 1801 until April 1807. Apart from the St Leger he won many other important races including three Brocket Hall Gold Cups (beating the Derby winner Eleanor on the third occasion), two Oatlands Stakes at Newmarket Racecourse, a Great Subscription Purse at York, a King's Plate and the Jockey Club Plate (defeating the St Leger winner Cockfighter). In all he won twenty-one times in thirty-six races for four different owners before being retired to stud, one of which was Mr Hallett Esq, where he proved to be a successful sire of winners.

== Background ==
Quiz was a chestnut horse with a broad white blaze and two white socks. He was one of many good horses, including Barefoot, bred and owned by the partnership of the Reverend Henry Goodricke (Rector of Aldborough) and Giles Crompton. Although Goodricke has been regarded as the real owner of Quiz, it was in Crompton's ownership that the colt actually raced during his three-year-old season. His dam, Miss West, was a "celebrated" broodmare who produced many good winners for Goodricke before dying at Aldborough at the age of twenty-five in early 1802.

Quiz was sired by Buzzard, a successful racehorse who became an influential stallion. His only other classic winner was the Oaks winner Bronze, but he also sired the stallions Rubens and Selim, both of whom became Leading sire in Great Britain and Ireland.

== Racing career ==
=== 1801: three-year-old season ===
Quiz was unraced as a two-year-old and did not appear on a racecourse until late August 1801, when he had two engagement at York Racecourse. On his debut he finished third behind Lenox and Miracle, who ran a dead heat in a sweepstakes over one and a half miles. Two days later Quiz was runner-up to Lord Darlington's colt Muly Moloch in a two-mile sweepstakes, showing improved form to beat Lenox into third.

On 22 September, Quiz was one of eight colts, from an original entry of eleven, to contest the twenty-sixth running of the St Leger Stakes over two miles at Doncaster Racecourse. Muly Moloch was made favourite ahead of Lenox and Miracle, with Quiz, entering the race as a maiden the fifth choice in the betting on 7/1. Ridden by John Shepherd, Quiz won the classic from Sir William Gerard's Belleisle, with Miracle third. Quiz ended his season with two races at Malton in October, beginning with a win over a single opponent in a two-mile sweepstakes. On the following afternoon, Quiz was matched against older horses in a King's Plate, a three-mile race run in a series of heats, with the prize going to the first horse to win twice. Quiz won the first heat, but was beaten by the six-year-old Game-nut in the second and finished third to the same horse in final heat.

=== 1802: four-year-old season ===
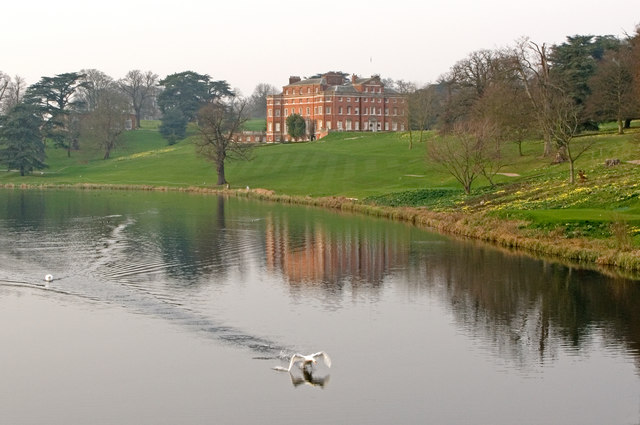
The grounds of Brocket Hall, where Quiz won three Gold Cups.

In 1802, Quiz was sold to race in the pea-green and black colours of Francis Dawson and moved to compete in the south of England. He began his four-year-old campaign at Newmarket's Craven meeting in April where he won a 100 guinea match race against Mr Payne's unnamed colt, carrying thirty-two pounds more than his rival. At the next Newmarket meeting in May, Quiz sustained his only defeat of the season when finishing third under top weight in a ten furlong sweepstakes. At the Second Spring meeting two weeks later, Quiz contested the Jockey Club Plate in which he defeated the 1799 St Leger winner Cockfighter over the four mile Beacon Course, despite being opposed in the betting. On 28 May, Quiz appeared at Brocket-Hall in Hertfordshire where he won the local Gold Cup over three and a half miles, beating five opponents at odds of 4/5.

Quiz returned north in late summer for two races at York. On the 24 August he won a King's Plate, repeating his St Leger performance by beating Belleisle into second. Four days later he defeated Lennox, Alonzo and Muly Moloch to win a division of the valuable Great Subscription Purse over four miles.

=== 1803: five-year-old season ===
Quiz continued his run of success by claiming a further six prizes in the spring of 1803, although only two of them were in competitive races. At the Craven meeting on 11 April he won a 1000 guinea match race, defeating Highland Fling over the Beacon Course. On the following afternoon, he started favourite for the Oatlands Stakes, a handicap race over the two mile Ditch-In course and won from eight opponents. On the opening day of the First Spring meeting two weeks later Quiz walked over for a subscription race over the Round Course to claim his seventh "win" in succession. At the Second Spring meeting in May, Squire Teazle and Babylon were both withdrawn from match races against Quiz over the Beacon Course, enabling Dawson to collect 150 guineas in forfeits without having to run his horse. Later at the same meeting, however, Quiz was beaten for the first time in a year, when he was defeated by Lord Sackvill's six-year-old Dick Andrews in a 100 guinea match. The Sporting Magazine reported that the race attracted more than £10,000 in betting. On 20 May Quiz won his second Brocket Hall Gold Cup, walking over the three and a half mile course when the other fourteen runners were withdrawn by their owners.

=== 1804: six-year-old season ===
On 16 April at Newmarket, Quiz began his fourth season by beating Mr Delmé Radcliffe's horse Driver in a subscription race over the Round Course. Driver was in fact owned by the Prince of Wales, who used Radcliffe's name when running his horses at Newmarket following a disagreement with the Jockey Club in 1791. Two days later Quiz was beaten by the Duke of Grafton's mare Penelope in a sweepstakes over the four mile Duke's Course. In May, Quiz finished second to another outstanding mare when he was beaten by Sir Charles Bunbury's Derby-winner Eleanor over ten furlongs at Newmarket. Later that month Quiz and Eleanor met again at level weights in the Brocket Hall Gold Cup. The mare was strongly favoured in the betting, but Quiz reversed the Newmarket form to win the race for the third year in succession. As in the previous season, Quiz did not race in 1804 after his victory at Brocket Hall.

Francis Dawson died in 1804, and Quiz passed into the ownership of Francis Neale.

=== 1805: seven-year-old season ===
For the fourth year in succession, Quiz began his season at the Craven meeting, where he finished unplaced behind the 1803 Derby winner Ditto in the weight-for-age Craven Stakes. He then missed the two Newmarket spring meetings before reappearing at Epsom Downs Racecourse at the end of May. He won both heats of a £50 Plate on Derby Day and both heats of the four-mile Surrey Yeomens' Plate on the following afternoon.

Quiz raced at a variety of courses in summer and early autumn. On 17 July he started favourite for a race at Winchester in Hampshire but was withdrawn after being beaten in the first two heats. In the following month he appeared at Reading in Berkshire where he carried top weight of 126 pounds to a half length victory in the local Gold Cup. A week later, Quiz was at Egham in Surrey where he was made joint favourite for the local Gold Cup but bolted during the race and failed to finish. Two days later he finished second to Eleanor in the Town Plate at the same venue. He ended his season at Abingdon a week later, winning the Members' Purse in two heats from a single opponent.

=== 1806: eight-year-old season ===
In 1806, Quiz yet again began his season at the Craven meeting, where he carried 130 pounds to an easy victory in a division of the Oatlands Stakes. At the Second Spring meeting in May he finished second when attempting to concede six pounds to the 1802 St Leger winner Orville in a sweepstakes over the Beacon Course. Racing at Ascot in June, Quiz won for the second time as an eight-year-old when he defeated Major Wilson's brother to Vivaldi in a three-mile sweepstakes. Quiz's season ended on 5 August at Oxford, where he had two engagements: he finished second to Mr Howorth's four-year-old Langton in the Oxford Cup and then "fell lame" after finishing third in the first heat of the Oxford Town Plate.

=== 1807: nine-year-old season ===
Quiz's final season as a racehorse began, as usual, at the Craven meeting, where he finished fifth of the seven runners under a weight of 129 pounds in a division of the Oatlands Stakes. After this race, Quiz was sold and ran at the First Spring meeting two weeks later in the ownership of Lord Rous. Quiz was matched against Lord Sackville's five-year-old Bustard and recorded his last victory by winning "very easy" at odds of 5/2 over the Beacon Course. His final race came two days later, when he started favourite for a King's Plate over the same course, but finished last of the five runners behind Hippomenes.

== Stud career ==
Quiz was retired from racing to stand as a breeding stallion at Henham Hall near Wangford in Suffolk. He began his time at Henham at a stud fee of ten guineas for Thoroughbreds and five guineas for "hunting mares". In 1816 his fee rose to sixteen guineas, after he had sired a number of good winners despite attracting "very few mares". By 1822 his fee had fallen back to eleven guineas, and he was being advertised as "the only stallion living out of a Matchem mare".

Quiz remained in apparently perfect health until 14 June 1826 when he died at the age of twenty-eight, immediately after covering a mare.

Quiz's best offspring was probably Tigris, who won the 2000 Guineas in 1815. He also sired Tigris' full brother Euphrates who finished third in the Derby and won the Doncaster Cup and Roller, who won the Craven Stakes.

== Sire line tree ==
- Quiz
  - Tigris
  - Roller
    - Pioneer
    - Kildare
    - Freney
  - Euphrates

== Pedigree ==
Pedigree of Quiz (GB), chestnut stallion, 1798
Sire Buzzard (GB) 1787	Woodpecker; 1773	Herod	Tartar
Sire Buzzard (GB) 1787	Woodpecker; 1773	Herod	Cypron
Sire Buzzard (GB) 1787	Woodpecker; 1773	Miss Ramsden	Cade*^
Sire Buzzard (GB) 1787	Woodpecker; 1773	Miss Ramsden	Lonsdale mare
Sire Buzzard (GB) 1787	Misfortune; 1775	Dux	Matchem*^#
Sire Buzzard (GB) 1787	Misfortune; 1775	Dux	Duchess
Sire Buzzard (GB) 1787	Misfortune; 1775	Curiosity	Snap
Sire Buzzard (GB) 1787	Misfortune; 1775	Curiosity	Regulus mare*^#
Dam Miss West 1777	Matchem*; 1748	Cade*^#	Godolphin Arabian*^#
Dam Miss West 1777	Matchem*; 1748	Cade*^#	Roxana*^
Dam Miss West 1777	Matchem*; 1748	Croft's Partner mare*	Partner*
Dam Miss West 1777	Matchem*; 1748	Croft's Partner mare*	Brown Farewell*
Dam Miss West 1777	Regulus mare* 1763	Regulus*	Godolphin Arabian*^#
Dam Miss West 1777	Regulus mare* 1763	Regulus*	Grey Robinson*
Dam Miss West 1777	Regulus mare* 1763	Young Ebony*^	Crab*
Dam Miss West 1777	Regulus mare* 1763	Young Ebony*^	Ebony* (Family 5)

* Quiz is inbred 4S x 2D to the stallion Matchem, meaning that he appears fourth generation on the sire side of his pedigree and second generation on the dam side of his pedigree.

* Quiz is inbred 4S x 2D to the mare Regulus mare, meaning that she appears fourth generation on the sire side of his pedigree and second generation on the dam side of his pedigree.

*^ Quiz is inbred 4S x 5S x 3D to the stallion Cade, meaning that he appears fourth generation and fifth generation (via Matchem)^ on the sire side of his pedigree and third generation on the dam side of his pedigree.

*^# Quiz is inbred 5S x 6S x 6S x 4D x 4D to the stallion Godolphin Arabian, meaning that he appears fifth generation once (via Cade)# and sixth generation twice (via Matchem and Regulus mare)# on the sire side of his pedigree and fourth generation twice on the dam side of his pedigree.
