= John Shepherd (jockey) =

British jockey

Personal information
- Born: 9 October 1765 Malton, North Yorkshire
- Died: 1848 (aged 82–83) Malton, North Yorkshire
- Occupation: Jockey

Horse racing career
- Sport: Horse racing

Major racing wins
- Major races Epsom Derby (1806); St Leger (1797, 1801, 1814)

Significant horses
- Lounger, Paris, Quiz, William

John Shepherd (9 October 1765 - 1848) was a four times British Classic-winning jockey and trainer. He was a pioneering Northern jockey, one of the few of his time to move south to Newmarket, the home of British horse racing and gain a reputation there.

== Career ==
Shepherd was born at Cockhill, near York on 9 October 1765. He had an ideal build for a jockey and became an apprentice at the stables of John Tesseyman at Moor Monkton near his home aged only 12. According to some sources he would ride his first race four years later. In others his first race is said to be on a horse called Dusty Miller in an "ever-to-be-remembered race" between Pacolet and Partington in 1784.

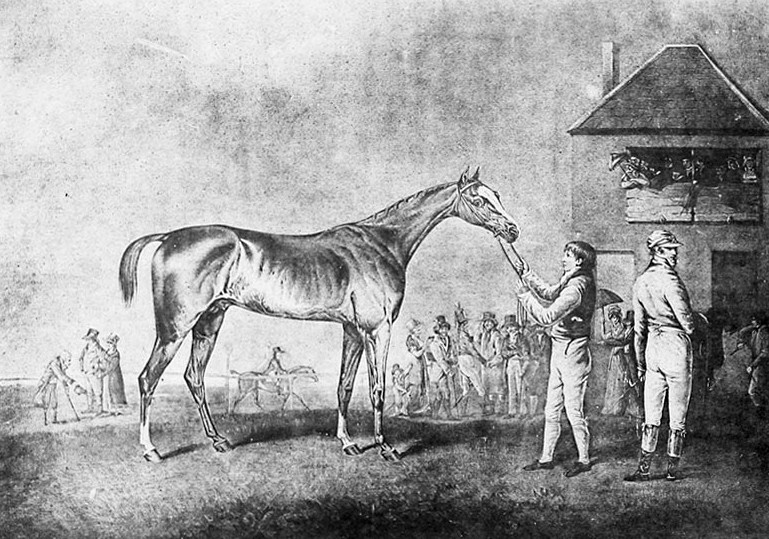
Quiz, on which Shepherd won the 1801 St Leger, engraving by Ben Marshall

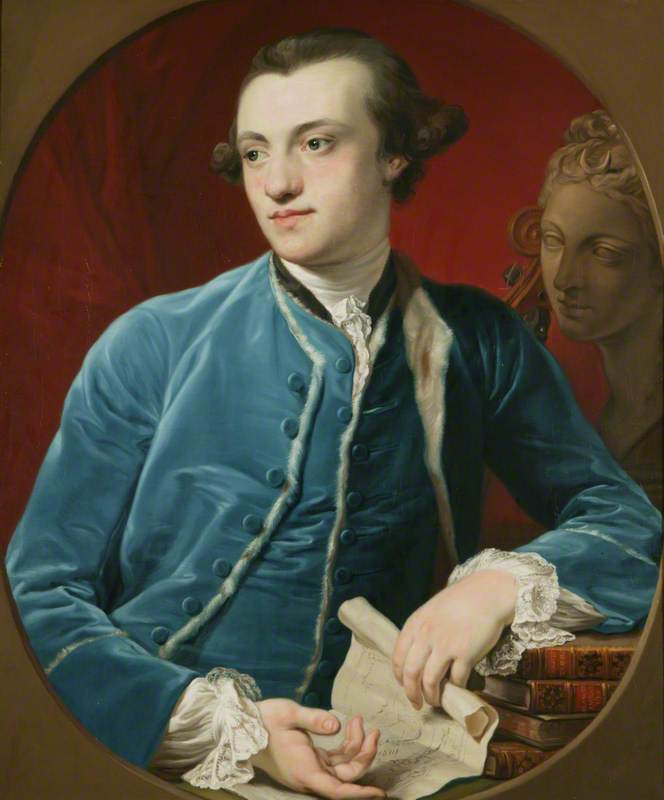
The Duke of Hamilton, one of Shepherd's patrons

Having established his reputation as a jockey, he was hired to ride the horses of Richard Savile, the future Earl of Scarbrough, and later to train them as well, at stables at Langton Wold in Malton. He would also ride for the Reverend Mr Goodriche.

After several years in Malton, he moved south to Newmarket to ride and train for Lord Foley, for which he was paid an annual retainer of £200. It was for Foley that he would have his single success in the Derby, on Paris in 1806, winning by a head from a field of twelve.

A further move would see him ride for Sir M M Sykes. He would also ride for Henry Peirse and Sir Frank Standish. He would twice win the St Leger for Gilbert Crompton - on Lounger in 1797 and Quiz in 1801 - and once, aged nearly 50, for the Duke of Hamilton on William in 1814. Other horses on which he made his name included Cammillus, Magistrate, Prime Minister, Sir Malagigi, Rosetta, Rosanne, Reveller, Lisette, Scancalaldi, Epperston, Cambyses and Consul.

== Riding style and character ==
His specialism was four mile heats, and he was regarded as the best of his generation at judging pace in these races. His skill was such that it dispelled the prejudice normally shown by the Newmarket establishment to jockeys from the north. Indeed, with other Yorkshire jockeys John Mangle and John Jackson, it is said he "shone". He was also regarded as an honest and dependable jockey.

== Personal life ==
In his later years, in the late 1830s, Shepherd ran a pub in Malton. He received a pension from the Bentinck Benevolent Fund (the first person to do so) as a result of the years spent in the employ of the Earl of Scarbrough. Despite this, he died in 1848 in poverty, with a large family having swallowed up his savings.

== Major wins ==
(United Kingdom) Great Britain

- Epsom Derby - Paris (1806)
- St Leger - (3) - Lounger (1797), Quiz (1801), William (1814)

== Bibliography ==
- Mortimer, Roger; Onslow, Richard; Willett, Peter (1978). Biographical Encyclopaedia of British Racing. London: Macdonald and Jane's. ISBN 0-354-08536-0.
- Nimrod (1843). The Chace, the Turf and the Road (2nd ed.). London: John Murray.
- Tanner, Michael; Cranham, Gerry (1992). Great Jockeys of the Flat. Enfield, Middlesex: Guinness Publishing. ISBN 0-85112-989-7.
