= John Jackson (jockey) =

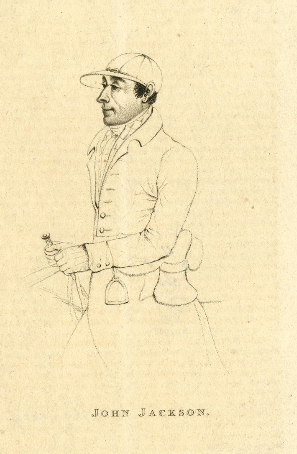
- John Jackson, English jockey, illustrated in the Sporting Magazine, 1816

Personal information
- Born: 1768
- Died: 5 August 1839 (aged 70–71) Allerton
- Occupation: Jockey

Horse racing career
- Sport: Horse racing

Major racing wins
- British Classic Races: St Leger Stakes (1791, 1794, 1796, 1798, 1805, 1813, 1815, 1822)

Significant horses
- Altisidora, Ambrosio, Beningbrough, Filho da Puta, Staveley, Symmetry, Theodore, Young Traveller
- Updated on 27 January 2022

John Jackson (1768 - 1839) was an eight-time St Leger-winning jockey and the leading jockey in Northern England around the turn of the 19th century. He is the jockey with the second most wins in the history of the Doncaster classic, joint with Lester Piggott and behind only John Scott.

== Career ==
He started out as an apprentice to Mr Burdon at Stainton-in-Cleveland. Later he was associated with the successful Middleham trainer John Mangle, riding at a weight of 7 stone, 7 pounds.

He won his first St Leger in 1791 on Young Traveller and followed up in 1794 (Beningbrough), 1796 (Ambrosio), 1798 (Symmetry) and 1805 (Staveley)

He won the 1813 St Leger on the T Sykes-trained, R Watt-owned Altisidora and the 1815 edition on Filho da Puta. But things went wrong when trying to win an eighth on Blacklock. Described as a true distance horse, with a huge stride, "requiring a half-mile to settle it", Blacklock was a strong fancy for the race. Sykes instructed Jackson to "ride him as thou lik'st, only lay thee hands down, and let him stride along, and he'll distance the lot". True to form, at the distance post, Blacklock had a three length lead. Sykes called Jackson to steady him, "thou hast it all thy own way", but the call was heard by the jockey on his rival Ebor, who moved into Blacklock's blind spot and came past him to win by a head.

Sykes was allegedly enraged by Jackson's riding, and eventually succeeded in having him dismissed from Watt's service, although in reality it was Sykes' call that had cost Blacklock the win. Jackson and Sykes now hated each other, Jackson blaming Sykes for the loss of his job. Jackson turned to drink and his behaviour became increasingly erratic. One night, after drinking heavily at Catterick Bridge, he stepped outside the inn to fight Sykes, but was so drunk he mistakenly ended up fighting a passing chimney sweep instead.

He won a further St Leger after this incident - on Theodore in 1822 - but by 1823 he was "no longer employable" and went into retirement. His St Leger victories were described as "a circumstance unparalleled among jockeys" and his career was said to have eclipsed that of "one of the oldest, best, and ... most successful of the northern jockeys", Robert Johnson.

On retiring, he first bought the Racecourse Farm at Allerton, then became landlord of the Black Swan Inn in the town. He was generous with his friends and died, virtually penniless, in Allerton on 5 August 1839.

Jackson fathered 12 children.

== Major wins ==
(United Kingdom) Great Britain

- St Leger Stakes - (8) - Young Traveller (1791), Beningbrough (1794), Ambrosio (1796), Symmetry (1798), Staveley (1805), Altisidora (1813), Filho da Puta (1815), Theodore (1822)

== See also ==
- List of jockeys
