= Ambidexter (horse) =

British Thoroughbred racehorse

- Sire: Phoenomenon
- Grandsire: Herod
- Dam: Manilla
- Damsire: Goldfinder
- Sex: Stallion
- Foaled: 1787
- Country: Kingdom of Great Britain
- Colour: Bay
- Breeder: R Hill
- Owner: Henry Goodricke; R Hill; Mr Dealtry; Giles Crompton
- Trainer: George Searle
- Record: 8: 2-3-1

Major wins
- Match against Mr Bethell's colt (1790); St Leger Stakes (1790)

Ambidexter (foaled 1787) was a British Thoroughbred racehorse best known for winning the classic St Leger Stakes in 1790. In a racing career which lasted from May 1790 until September 1791, and was conducted exclusively in Yorkshire, he won two of his eight races. After his retirement from racing he does not appear to have been used as a breeding stallion.

== Background ==
Ambidexter was a bay horse sired by the 1783 St Leger winner Phoenomenon who stood as a stallion in Yorkshire for several years before being exported to the United States where he died in 1798. According to the General Stud Book Ambidexter was bred by R Hill and was the fourth of ten foals produced by Manilla, a mare bred by Reverend Henry Goodricke, Rector of Aldborough. Hill and Goodricke were part of a group of Yorkshire based owners and breeders which also included Gilbert Crompton and Mr Dealtry. Ambidexter raced in the colours of various members of the group. Manilla was an important broodmare, whose other descendants included Lounger, Imperatrix, Blacklock, Theodore, Teddington and Sir Hercules.

== Racing career ==
=== 1790: three-year-old season ===
Ambidexter made his first appearance on 19 May at York Racecourse, when he ran in the ownership of Hill. He won a two-mile, 200 guinea, match race against an unnamed colt owned by Mr Bethell. In his remaining races of 1790, the colt's owner was recorded as Mr Dealtry. In August, Ambidexter returned to York where he finished second to Henry Pierse's grey filly Contessina in a two-mile sweepstakes. Three days later he contested a race over one and a quarter miles, which was run in a series of heats with the £50 prize going to the first horse to win twice. He started favourite, but finished fifth to Mr Witty's four-year-old Grog in both heats. On 28 September, Ambidexter was one of eight three-year-olds, from an original entry of fifteen, to contest the St Leger Stakes over two miles at Doncaster Racecourse. He started at odds of 5/1 behind the joint-favourites Spanker (owned by the Duke of Hamilton) and Partridge (owned by Sir G Armytage). Ridden by his trainer George Searle, Ambidexter won the classic from Lord Archibald Hamilton's unnamed bay colt, with Spanker in third.

=== 1791: four-year-old season ===
Ambidexter was off the course for eleven months after his St Leger victory, reappearing at York on 23 August 1791. He started favourite for a four-mile sweepstakes but finished third of the four runners behind Lord Foley's Ratler. A week later Ambidexter made his first appearance in the colours of Giles Crompton when he ran in a race in heats at Chesterfield. He won the first heat but was beaten in the next two by Buzzard, a chestnut colt owned by Mr Bullock. On 13 September, Ambidexter ran in a £50 race in heats at Wakefield. He finished second in the first heat, and won the second, but was beaten in the deciding heat by Pigeon, a four-year-old filly. Ambidexter's last recorded race was the Gold Cup at Doncaster on 28 September, an event which brought together four winners of the St Leger: Ambidexter, Young Traveller, Pewett and Spadille. Young Traveller won the race from Spadille, with Contessina third, Ambidexter fourth and Pewett seventh.

== Stud career ==
Ambidexter never appeared on the lists of stallions whose services were advertised in the Racing Calendar, and he has no offspring listed in the General Stud Book. He may have died of natural causes or been euthanised after his final race, although it is possible that he was gelded and used as a hack or hunter.

== Pedigree ==
Pedigree of Ambidexter (GB), bay colt, 1787
Sire Phoenomenon (GB) 1780	Herod; 1758	Tartar	Partner
Sire Phoenomenon (GB) 1780	Herod; 1758	Tartar	Meliora
Sire Phoenomenon (GB) 1780	Herod; 1758	Cypron	Blaze
Sire Phoenomenon (GB) 1780	Herod; 1758	Cypron	Salome
Sire Phoenomenon (GB) 1780	Frenzy; 1774	Eclipse	Marske
Sire Phoenomenon (GB) 1780	Frenzy; 1774	Eclipse	Spilletta
Sire Phoenomenon (GB) 1780	Frenzy; 1774	Engineer mare	Engineer
Sire Phoenomenon (GB) 1780	Frenzy; 1774	Engineer mare	Blank mare
Dam Manilla (GB) 1777	Goldfinder; 1764	Snap	Snip
Dam Manilla (GB) 1777	Goldfinder; 1764	Snap	sister to Slipby
Dam Manilla (GB) 1777	Goldfinder; 1764	Blank mare (1763)	Blank
Dam Manilla (GB) 1777	Goldfinder; 1764	Blank mare (1763)	Regulus mare
Dam Manilla (GB) 1777	Old England mare 1766	Old England	Godolphin Arabian
Dam Manilla (GB) 1777	Old England mare 1766	Old England	Amorett
Dam Manilla (GB) 1777	Old England mare 1766	Cullen Arabian mare	Cullen Arabian
Dam Manilla (GB) 1777	Old England mare 1766	Cullen Arabian mare	Miss Cade (Family:2-t)
