= Lounger (horse) =

British Thoroughbred racehorse

- Sire: Drone
- Grandsire: Herod
- Dam: Miss Judy
- Damsire: Alfred
- Sex: Stallion
- Foaled: 1794
- Country: Kingdom of Great Britain
- Colour: Bay
- Breeder: Henry Goodricke & Gilbert Crompton
- Owner: Gilbert Crompton; Mr Vernon
- Trainer: George Searle
- Record: 19:8-3-7

Major wins
- St Leger Stakes (1797)

Lounger (foaled 1794) was a British Thoroughbred racehorse best known for winning the classic St Leger Stakes in 1797. Bred and initially trained in Yorkshire he won his last three races as a three-year-old including the St Leger at Doncaster Racecourse. He won a further five races as a four-year-old before being sold and transferred to the south of England where he raced with disappointing results in 1799. He does not appear to have had a stud career.

== Background ==
Lounger was a bay horse bred by his owner Gilbert Crompton, who operated his racing interests in partnership with the Reverend Henry Goodricke, Rector of Aldborough. Lounger was the only classic winner sired by Drone, a successful racehorse who twice defeated the Derby winner Diomed. As a breeding stallion, Drone was based in Yorkshire before being exported to the United States where he stood in Connecticut and New York. Lounger was the fourth of fourteen foals produced by Goodricke's broodmare Miss Judy. As a granddaughter of the Old England mare, the foundation mare of Thoroughbred family 2-t, Miss Judy was closely related to many good horses of the time including Theodore, Blacklock, Ambidexter and Imperatrix. Miss Judy's other descendants included The Derby winner Teddington.

== Racing career ==
=== 1797: three-year-old season ===
Lounger's racing career began at Beverley Racecourse, where he finished third to Mr Bethell's unnamed grey filly in a sweepstake over one and a half miles on 14 June. Three days later at the same venue he ran in a weight-for-age maiden race which was run in a series of two mile heats, with the prize going to the first horse to win twice. He finished fourth to Sir Thomas Gascoigne's four-year-old Opposition in the first heat and runner-up to the same in the second. On his next appearance he recorded his first win in a race at Nottingham Racecourse in August: he finished fourth in the first heat to a filly named Creeping Ceres, but won the next two heats.

On 26 September, Lounger was one of eight colts, from an original entry of twelve, to contest the twenty-second running of the St Leger Stakes over two-miles at Doncaster Racecourse. Sir Frank Standish's colt Stamford, the beaten favourite in Epsom Derby, was the favourite at odds of 4/7 and dominated the betting to such an extent that none of the other runners' odds were recorded. Ridden by John Shepherd, Lounger created an upset by winning the classic from the favourite, with the first two being the only finishers officially placed by the judge. Lounger ended his season at Malton on 11 October, when he won a weight-for-age sweepstakes over a distance of three miles.

=== 1798: four-year-old season ===
Lounger won five of his seven races as a four-year-old in 1798. He began his season on 25 May at York Racecourse where he ran a dead heat with Thomas Gascoigne's three-year-old Symmetry in a sweepstake over one and a half miles, before beating the younger horse in a deciding heat. Symmetry went on to win that season's St Leger. At Beverley in June Lounger defeated three opponents in a sweepstakes over three miles. He took his winning run to six at York in August when he defeated Thomas Gascoigne's Timothy in a 250 guinea match race, but was beaten into second place by Stamford in the four mile Ladies' Plate later in the meeting.

At Lincoln Racecourse in September, Lounger won two of three heats over two miles to win a race worth 487 guineas. As in 1797, Lounger ended his season at Malton in October. He finished third to Hippona when starting favourite for a sweepstakes over two miles, but ended his season with a victory as he won both heats of a race over three miles on the following day.

=== 1799: five-year-old season ===
Before the start of the 1799 season, Lounger was bought by Mr Vernon and moved to compete in the south of England. He had little success, failing to win in seven races, although he only once finished worse than third. He began the year by finishing third to Diamond in a King's Plate at Newmarket's First Spring meeting in April. At the next Newmarket meeting later that month he finished third to Diamond and Stamford in the Jockey Club Plate, and third again in a handicap race over the two mile "Ditch-in" course. In July he finished fourth to Paynator in a handicap at Newmarket and third in the Petworth Stakes at Brighthelmstone. In the following month he finished fifth and third in two heats of a handicap at Lewes. Lounger made his final appearance at Bedford Racecourse on 10 September when he was beaten by Charles Bunbury's colt Combatant, his only opponent in the Woburn Stakes, a four-mile claiming race.

== Stud career ==
Lounger seems to disappear from the sporting records after his defeat at Bedford. He does not appear in any of the lists of stallions whose services were advertised in the Sporting Calendar and the Sporting Magazine, and he has no foals recorded in the General Stud Book. He may have died of natural causes or been euthanised after his final race, although it is possible that he was gelded and used as a hack or hunter.

== Pedigree ==
Pedigree of Lounger (GB), bay stallion, 1794
Sire Drone (GB) 1777	Herod; 1758	Tartar	Partner
Sire Drone (GB) 1777	Herod; 1758	Tartar	Meliora
Sire Drone (GB) 1777	Herod; 1758	Cypron	Blaze
Sire Drone (GB) 1777	Herod; 1758	Cypron	Salome
Sire Drone (GB) 1777	Lily; 1765	Blank	Godolphin Arabian
Sire Drone (GB) 1777	Lily; 1765	Blank	Amorett
Sire Drone (GB) 1777	Lily; 1765	Peggy	Cade
Sire Drone (GB) 1777	Lily; 1765	Peggy	Partner mare (1744)
Dam Miss Judy (GB) 1784	Alfred; 1770	Matchem	Cade
Dam Miss Judy (GB) 1784	Alfred; 1770	Matchem	Partner mare (1735)
Dam Miss Judy (GB) 1784	Alfred; 1770	Snap mare	Snap
Dam Miss Judy (GB) 1784	Alfred; 1770	Snap mare	Diana
Dam Miss Judy (GB) 1784	Manilla; 1777	Goldfinder	Snap
Dam Miss Judy (GB) 1784	Manilla; 1777	Goldfinder	Blank mare
Dam Miss Judy (GB) 1784	Manilla; 1777	Old England mare	Old England
Dam Miss Judy (GB) 1784	Manilla; 1777	Old England mare	Cullen Arabian mare (Family 2-t)

- Lounger was inbred 4 x 4 to Snap and Cade, meaning that these stallions appear twice in the fourth generations of his pedigree.
