= 1790 in sports =

1790 in sports describes the year's events in world sport.

== Boxing ==
Events

- 30 August — "Big" Ben Brain and William Hooper fought to a 3 hour & 30 minute 180th round fight at Chapel Row Level, it was a draw.
- Tom Johnson retained his English championship but no fights involving him are recorded in 1790. At one point, he announced his retirement but later retracted it.
- Spectators were charged for entry to the bout between Daniel Mendoza and Richard Humphries, the first time this is known to have happened in boxing. Admission charges are known to have been used in cricket since the 1730s.
- George Meggs defeated Joe Ward, location unknown.

== Cricket ==
England

- Most runs – Billy Beldham 317
- Most wickets – Robert Clifford 33

== Horse racing ==
England

- The Derby – Rhadamanthus
- The Oaks – Hippolyta
- St Leger Stakes – Ambidexter
