= 1776 in sports =

1776 in sports describes the year's events in world sport.

== Boxing ==
Events

- 10 October — Harry Sellers defeated Peter Corcoran at Staines to claim the Championship of England title. The fight's duration was either 18 rounds in 32 minutes or 32 rounds in 28 minutes. There is a possibility that Corcoran "threw" the fight. Sellers held the title until 1779.

== Cricket ==
Events

- The earliest known scorecard templates were introduced. They were printed by T. Pratt of Sevenoaks and soon come into general use.

England

- Most runs – John Small 423
- Most wickets – Lumpy Stevens 27

== Horse racing ==
Events

- The inaugural St Leger Stakes was run at Doncaster Racecourse. It was organised by Anthony St Leger, a British Army officer who lived near the course, and it is the oldest of the five British Classic Races.

England

- St Leger Stakes – Allabaculia
