= 1814 in sports =

1814 in sports describes the year's events in world sport.

== Bandy ==
Events

- The first recorded games of bandy take place in the Fens of East Anglia during the great frost of 1813–14, but it is probable that the game has been played there since the previous century. A feature of the Fens is that large expanses of ice form on flooded meadows or shallow washes in cold winters and skating is a tradition. Bury Fen bandy club from Bluntisham-cum-Earith, near St Ives, is the most successful team, remaining unbeaten until 1890–91.

== Boxing ==
Events

- Tom Cribb retains his English championship but no fights involving him are recorded in 1814, although he does stage an exhibition of sparring for the Tsar of Russia.

== Cricket ==
Events

- The site of Lord's Middle Ground is requisitioned by Parliament for the building of the Regent's Canal. Thomas Lord contacts the Eyre family, erstwhile owners of the ground, and persuades them to lease to him another parcel of land in St John's Wood, about half a mile further north at a place called North Bank. This site has previously been a duckpond. In the winter of 1813-14, Lord again has his turf literally dug up and removed. He builds a high perimeter fence, a tavern and a pavilion at what is now Lord's Cricket Ground (Lord's).
- On 22 June 1814, Marylebone Cricket Club (MCC) plays the first match at Lord's against Hertfordshire, then as now a minor county.
- The first match of importance at Lord's is played 13–15 July 1814 when MCC takes on a team called St John's Wood that includes a number of Surrey players including Billy Beldham, William Lambert and William Ward.
- Jem Broadbridge makes his debut in first-class cricket.

England

- Most runs – Lord Frederick Beauclerk 126 (HS 59*)
- Most wickets – Thomas Howard and William Lambert 11 apiece

== Horse racing ==
Events

- Inaugural running of the 1,000 Guineas Stakes at Newmarket

England

- 1,000 Guineas Stakes – Charlotte
- 2,000 Guineas Stakes – Olive
- The Derby – Blucher
- The Oaks – Medora
- St. Leger Stakes – William
