= Job Marson =

English jockey

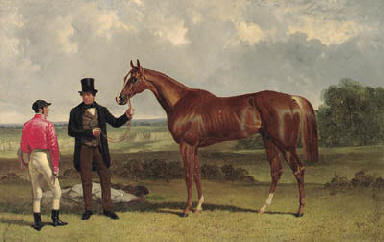
- Teddington, winner of the 1851 Epsom Derby, with trainer Alec Taylor and jockey Job Marson. Painting by John Frederick Herring, Sr. (1795-1865)

Personal information
- Born: 1817 Malton, North Riding of Yorkshire
- Died: 11 September 1857 (aged 40) Middleham, North Riding of Yorkshire
- Occupation: Jockey

Horse racing career
- Sport: Horse racing

Major racing wins
- Major races 1,000 Guineas Stakes (1851); Ascot Gold Cup (1851, 1853); Epsom Derby (1850, 1851); St Leger (1843, 1847, 1850)

Significant horses
- Aphrodite, Nutwith, Teddington, Van Tromp, Voltigeur, Woolwich

Job Marson (1817–1857) was an English classic-winning jockey, whose most famous partnership was with Voltigeur, winner of the 1850 Derby and St Leger.

== Career ==
Marson was born to trainer "Old" Job Marson in Malton, North Riding of Yorkshire in 1817. His first win came at Beverley in 1831, on a horse called Cinderella, and in his early years, he was much championed by fellow jockey Sim Templeman, getting many rides on his recommendation. His first big win came much later, in the 1841 Goodwood Cup, riding Charles XII, but then followed a period of extended success at the top level. Within another two years he had won his first classic - the 1843 St. Leger on Nutwith.

In 1847, he rode Van Tromp for Lord Eglinton in the Derby, coming third. Later that year, he went on to take the St. Leger on the horse. Rather than securing his position in Eglinton's favour, it had the opposite effect. Now suspecting that Marson had pulled Van Tromp in the Derby, Eglinton sacked him. Even Charles Marlow, Marson's successor as Eglinton's stable jockey, believed Marson to be innocent.

The setback did not mar Marson's career too much. Lord Zetland took him on, and it was for Zetland that Marson would ride one of the supreme champion horses of the 19th century, Voltigeur, who won both Derby and St. Leger in 1850.

For Sir Joseph Hawley, Marson won the 1851 1,000 Guineas on Aphrodite and the Derby on Teddington, receiving £2,000 in reward.

His last major win again came for Zetland in the 1856 Doncaster Cup on Fandango.

== Character and riding style ==
Marson rode at a weight of eight stone. He was a strong jockey, but was hard on his horses, using his spurs liberally. When riding, he sat bolt upright, in an inelegant style. As a jockey on the northern circuit, Marson had a loathing of Southern jockeys in general and, in particular Nat Flatman, who ended up riding Voltigeur in his most famous match against The Flying Dutchman.

== Personal life and death ==
Marson's son (another Job) also became a jockey, although he died at Thirsk aged only 24 in 1869. Marson himself died at Middleham, North Riding of Yorkshire on 11 September 1857. He is buried at Spennithorne nearby. His father outlived both son and grandson, dying in May 1872, aged 82.

== Major wins ==
(United Kingdom) Great Britain

- 1,000 Guineas Stakes - Aphrodite (1851)
- Ascot Gold Cup - (2) - Woolwich (1851), Teddington (1853)
- Epsom Derby - (2) - Voltigeur (1850), Teddington (1851)
- St Leger - (3) - Nutwith (1843), Van Tromp (1847), Voltigeur (1850)

== Bibliography ==
- Mortimer, Roger; Onslow, Richard; Willett, Peter (1978). Biographical Encyclopaedia of British flat Racing. London: Macdonald and Jane's. ISBN 0-354-08536-0. LCCN 79309727. OCLC 5405594. OL 4481332M.
- Tanner, Michael; Cranham, Gerry (1992). Great Jockeys of the Flat. Enfield, Middlesex: Guinness Publishing. ISBN 0-85112-989-7. OL 8266712M.
