= Ambidexter =

Ambidexter may refer to:

- Ambidexterity, the state of being equally adept in the use of both left and right appendages, usually the hands
- Ambidexter (horse), a British thoroughbred horse
- Ambidexter (genus), a type of shrimp in family Processidae
