= Allabaculia =

British racehorse

- Sire: Sampson
- Grandsire: Blaze
- Dam: Unknown
- Sex: Mare
- Foaled: 1773
- Country: Kingdom of Great Britain
- Colour: Bay
- Breeder: Marquess Rockingham
- Owner: Marquess Rockingham
- Record: 4:1-0-1

Major wins
- St. Leger Stakes (1776)

Allabaculia, or alternatively Alabaculia, (foaled 1773) was a British racemare that was the winner of the first St. Leger Stakes in 1776. Her maternal pedigree was not recorded and she did not race under the name "Allabaculia", with the name bestowed on her at a much later date. Allabaculia does not appear in the General Stud Book compiled by the Weatherbys.

== Origins ==
The filly that would be named Allabaculia was foaled in 1773 at the estate of the Marquess of Rockingham. She was sired by Sampson, who at the time of her birth was 27 years old. Sampson was defeated only once during his two-year racing career, the loss occurring due to his failing eyesight. He was first a stallion at Malton until he was purchased by Lord Rockingham, dying at Lord Rockingham's stud in 1777 at around 32 years of age. Allabaculia's dam and maternal lineage were not officially recorded. Count von Oettingen, in his work Horse breeding in theory and practice theorizes that Alabaculia descended from maternal Thoroughbred family #4. Racing Illustrated identified her dam as Old Allabaculia.

Until 1913 for three-year-olds and 1946 for two-year-olds, there was no requirement for British racehorses to have official names. The Rockingham filly never raced under the name "Allabaculia" and was instead known as Lord Rockingham's "br. b. f. by Sampson", an abbreviation for a brown-bay filly sired by Sampson. Her name was mentioned in 19th century racing publications by 1828. The name "Alabaculia" is most likely derived from the name of 18th century adventurer Ali Bey Kuli that revolted against the Ottoman Porte in 1770 and attempted to reinstate Egyptian independence. An oil painting of the filly by Benjamin Killingbeck was auctioned by Sotheby's in 1983 for £13,000 ($20,654).

== Racing career ==
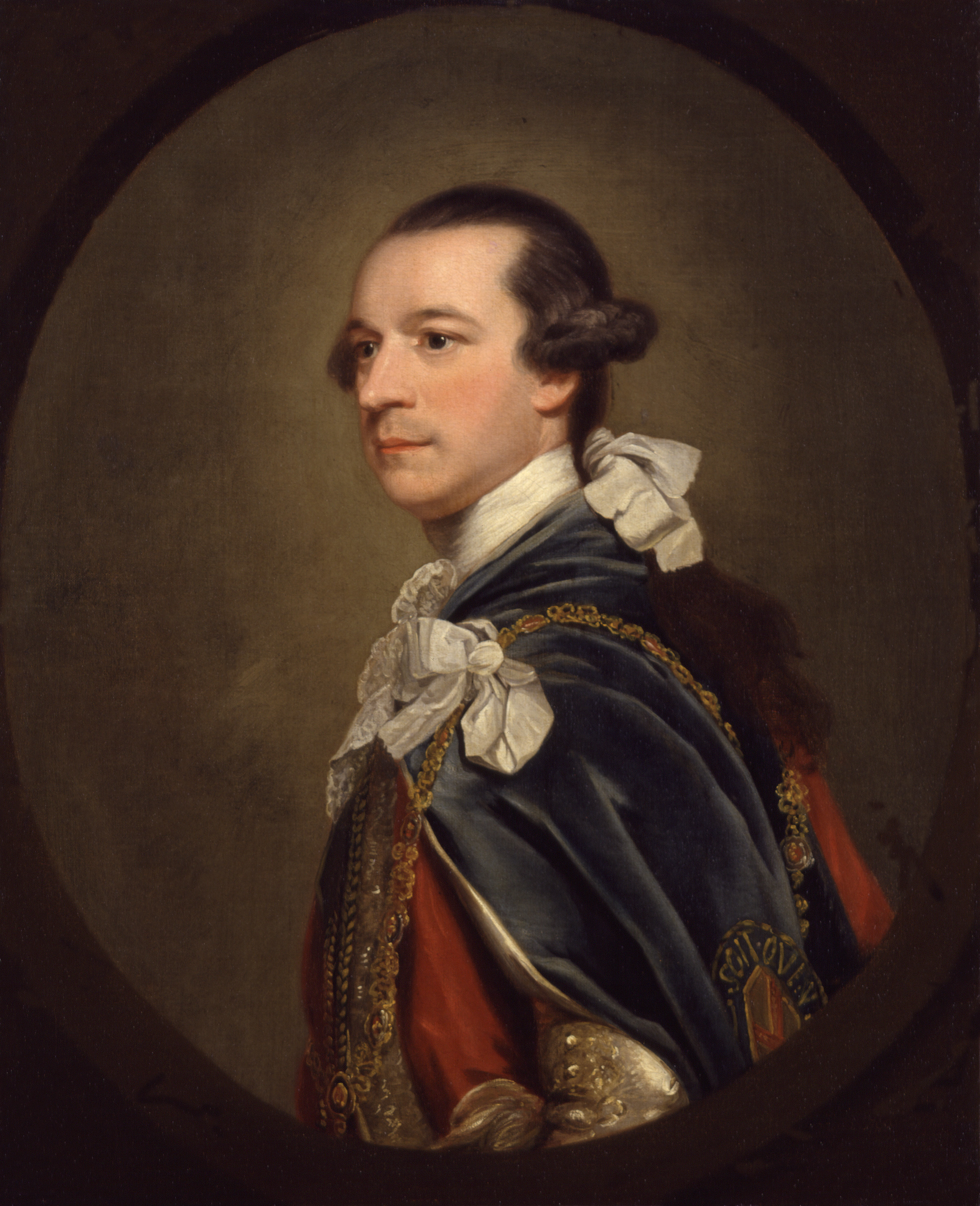
Lord Rockingham bred and owned Allabaculia during her racing career.

=== 1776: three-year-old season ===
In her first start, Rockingham's brown-bay filly was third in a 25-guinea subscription race at Nottingham. The St. Leger Stakes was not formally run under that name until 1778. At the time of the race's founding on Tuesday, 24 September 1776, it was a small subscription race run over two miles at Doncaster for 25 guineas per subscription. None of the six contenders were formally named and consisted of Lord Rockingham's "br. b. f. by Sampson", Colonel St. Leger's bay filly by Surly, Mr. Wentworth's bay colt by Doge, Lord Scarborough's chestnut colt by Remus, Mr. Foljambe's bay filly by a Son of Blank and Mr. Farrer's grey colt by Bay-Malton. The Rockingham filly won, followed by the Surly filly and the Doge colt. The betting odds were listed in the Racing Calendar as "2 to 1 on Ld Rockingham's colt". The inclusion of "colt" instead of "filly" in the odds is thought to be a misprint or a looser, more inclusive interpretation of the meaning of the word colt used at the time to include both sexes. The "St. Leger" running is the last reported start for the filly in 1776.

=== 1777: four-year-old season ===
On 17 March, the "brown-bay filly by Sampson" was fourth in the Craven Stakes held at the Newmarket meeting. The filly contended with 29 horses, losing to Maiden, Plunder and an unnamed colt by Gimcrack. She was fifth in a subscription race a few days later. This was the last start of her career. A mare named Allabaculia does not appear in the General Stud Book compiled by the Weatherby family in the early 1800s.

== Pedigree ==
Pedigree of Allabaculia (GB), Bay Mare, 1773
Sire Sampson (GB) Bay, 1745	Blaze	Flying Childers	Darley Arabian
Sire Sampson (GB) Bay, 1745	Blaze	Flying Childers	Betty Leedes
Sire Sampson (GB) Bay, 1745	Blaze	Confederate filly	Grey Grantham
Sire Sampson (GB) Bay, 1745	Blaze	Confederate filly	Black Barb mare
Sire Sampson (GB) Bay, 1745	Hip mare	Hip	Curwen's Bay Barb
Sire Sampson (GB) Bay, 1745	Hip mare	Hip	Sister to Hobby
Sire Sampson (GB) Bay, 1745	Hip mare	Spark mare	Spark
Sire Sampson (GB) Bay, 1745	Hip mare	Spark mare	Snake mare
Dam Unknown	Unknown	Unknown	Unknown
Dam Unknown	Unknown	Unknown	Unknown
Dam Unknown	Unknown	Unknown	Unknown
Dam Unknown	Unknown	Unknown	Unknown
Dam Unknown	Unknown	Unknown	Unknown
Dam Unknown	Unknown	Unknown	Unknown
Dam Unknown	Unknown	Unknown	Unknown
Dam Unknown	Unknown	Unknown	Unknown
