= Symmetry (horse) =

British Thoroughbred racehorse

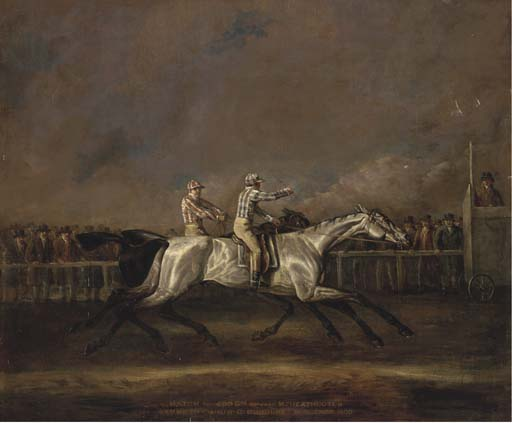
- Symmetry defeats Sorcerer at Newmarket on 30 September 1800.
- Sire: Delpini
- Grandsire: Highflyer
- Dam: Violet
- Damsire: Shark
- Sex: Stallion
- Foaled: 1795
- Country: Kingdom of Great Britain
- Colour: Grey
- Breeder: Sir Thomas Gascoigne, 8th Baronet
- Owner: Sir Thomas Gascoigne, 8th Baronet; William Fortescue, 1st Earl of Clermont; Mr Heathcote
- Trainer: Sam King
- Record: 13: 7-3-3

Major wins
- St Leger Stakes (1798); Match against Sir Harry (1799); Match against Sorcerer (1800); Match against Diamond (1800); Match against Humbug (1800)

Symmetry (foaled 1795) was a British Thoroughbred racehorse and sire best known for winning the classic St Leger Stakes in 1798. Originally trained in Yorkshire won the St Leger at Doncaster on his final appearance as a three-year-old and went on to defeat The Derby winner Sir Harry in a match race at York in the following year. As a five-year-old he was transferred to race at Newmarket where he lost a rematch with Sir Harry, but won his three remaining races, including matches against Sorcerer and Diamond, two of the leading racehorses of the time. After his retirement from racing, Symmetry was sold and exported to stand as a breeding stallion in Russia.

== Background ==
Symmetry was a grey horse bred by his owner Sir Thomas Gascoigne, 8th Baronet. His sire Delpini, from whom he inherited his colour, was a successful racehorse who won eight consecutive races at Newmarket in 1786 and 1787, before becoming a leading sire in the north of England. His stock were particularly noted for their stamina. Symmetry's dam Violet, also bred by Gascoigne, was a highly successful broodmare who also produced the Oaks winner Theophania (by Delpini) and Golden Locks, the dam of Soothsayer. Symmetry was the third of fourteen foals produced by Violet between 1793 and 1807.

== Racing career ==
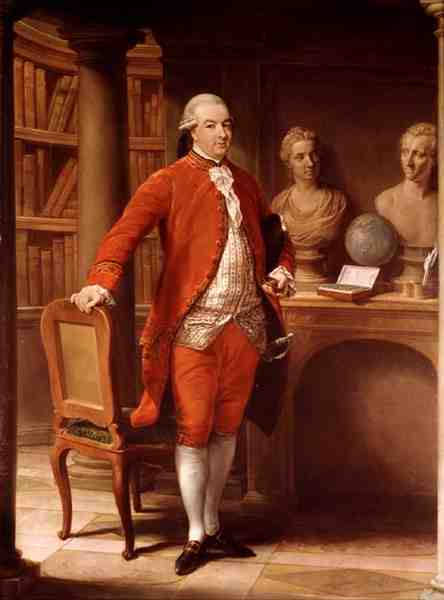
Sir Thomas Gascoigne, who bred and owned Symmetry

=== 1798: three-year-old season ===
Symmetry made his racecourse debut on 12 April at Catterick Bridge Racecourse in Yorkshire where he finished second of the twelve runners behind Brough in a two-mile sweepstakes. On 25 May at York Racecourse, Symmetry was pitted against the 1797 St Leger winner Lounger in a race over one and a half miles in which he carried twelve pounds less than the older horse. Symmetry ran Lounger to a dead heat, but was beaten in a run-off. Three weeks later, Symmetry recorded his first win when he defeated five other three-year-olds in a one and a half mile sweepstakes at Beverley Racecourse.

After a break of two months, Symmetry returned to action at York in August. He was made the 4/5 favourite for a two-mile race, but finished third of the four runners behind Henry Pierce's colt by Walnut (later named Gamenut), and Gilbert Crompton's colt Honeycomb. On 25 September, Symmetry was one of ten colts to contest the twenty-third running of the St Leger at Doncaster Racecourse. Honeycomb was made the 3/1 favourite, with Symmetry the second choice in the betting on 4/1. Ridden by John Jackson, Symmetry won the classic from Honeycomb, with Henry Tempest Vane's Push Forward in third. The win gave Gascoigne a second success in the race, following the grey filly Hollandoise's victory twenty years earlier.

=== 1799: four-year-old season ===
In August 1799 Sir Harry, the winner of the 1798 Epsom Derby traveled north for a match race against Symmetry over four miles at York. The southern colt was strongly favoured in the betting, but Symmetry defeated his rival to win a prize of 500 guineas. The London-based Sporting Magazine speculated that Sir Harry had been ill-suited by the soft, wet ground which was "knee deep in several places" and reported that interest was already strong for a rematch the following spring at Newmarket. Symmetry's only other run of 1799 came days two days after his match race win when he started 1/4 favourite for a sweepstakes, but finished last of the three runners behind the Duke of Hamilton's filly by Walnut.

=== 1800: five-year-old season ===
Symmetry had carried two pounds less than Sir Harry in their first meeting: for the rematch over Newmarket's two-mile "Ditch-In" course on 28 April he carried half a pound more than the Derby winner. The two horses started level in the betting, but Sir Harry reversed his previous defeat to win a prize of 200 guineas. Symmetry remained at Newmarket and entered the ownership of William Fortescue, 1st Earl of Clermont. A third match between Symmetry and Sir Harry was scheduled for the 14 May over the Abington Mile course, but Lord Clermont was able to claim a 50 guinea forfeit without having to run his new acquisition, as the Derby winner was withdrawn from the race. On 26 June, Symmetry finished third of the eight runners when carrying a weight of 158 pounds in a four-mile sweepstakes at Bibury.

Symmetry returned for Newmarket's "First October meeting" by which time he was running in the purple and white colours of Mr Heathcote. On 30 September he defeated Sir Charles Bunbury's black colt Sorcerer in a 500 guinea match over one and a quarter miles ("Across the Flat"). Symmetry ended his racing career with two match races at the Newmarket Houghton meeting at the end of October. On 27 of the month he defeated Mr Cookson's Diamond (loser of a famous match against Hambletonian in 1799) for 200 guineas across the flat and two days later he successfully conceded fourteen pounds to Humbug for 50 guineas over the Ditch-In course.

Symmetry was entered in two races at Newmarket the following spring, but did not appear in either, with Heathcote paying forfeit.

== Stud career ==
Symmetry never stood as a breeding stallion in Britain. According to the General Stud Book, he was sold and exported to Russia at an unspecified date.

== Pedigree ==
Pedigree of Symmetry (GB), grey stallion, 1795
Sire Delpini (GB) 1781	Highflyer; 1774	Herod	Tartar
Sire Delpini (GB) 1781	Highflyer; 1774	Herod	Cypron
Sire Delpini (GB) 1781	Highflyer; 1774	Rachel	Blank
Sire Delpini (GB) 1781	Highflyer; 1774	Rachel	Regulus mare
Sire Delpini (GB) 1781	Countess; 1760	Blank	Godolphin Arabian
Sire Delpini (GB) 1781	Countess; 1760	Blank	Amorett
Sire Delpini (GB) 1781	Countess; 1760	Rib mare	Rib
Sire Delpini (GB) 1781	Countess; 1760	Rib mare	Wynn Arabian mare
Dam Violet (GB) 1787	Shark; 1771	Marske	Squirt
Dam Violet (GB) 1787	Shark; 1771	Marske	The Ruby Mare
Dam Violet (GB) 1787	Shark; 1771	Snap mare	Snap
Dam Violet (GB) 1787	Shark; 1771	Snap mare	Marlborough mare
Dam Violet (GB) 1787	Syphon mare 1772	Syphon	Squirt
Dam Violet (GB) 1787	Syphon mare 1772	Syphon	Patriot mare
Dam Violet (GB) 1787	Syphon mare 1772	Charlotte	Blank
Dam Violet (GB) 1787	Syphon mare 1772	Charlotte	Crab mare (Family 15)

- Symmetry was inbred 3 × 4 × 4 to Blank, meaning that this stallion appears once in the third and twice in the fourth generations of his pedigree. He was also inbred 4 × 4 to Squirt.
