= Teddington (horse) =

British-bred Thoroughbred racehorse

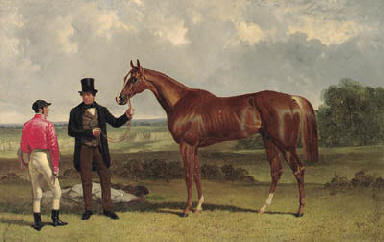
- Teddington, with Alec Taylor and Job Marson. By John Frederick Herring Sr.
- Sire: Orlando
- Grandsire: Touchstone
- Dam: Miss Twickenham
- Damsire: Rockingham
- Sex: Stallion
- Foaled: 1848
- Country: United Kingdom of Great Britain and Ireland
- Colour: Brown
- Breeder: Jack Tomlinson
- Owner: Sir Joseph Hawley
- Trainer: Alec Taylor Sr.
- Record: 18:10-1-4

Major wins
- Molecomb Stakes (1850); Epsom Derby (1851); Doncaster Cup (1852); Emperor of Russia's Plate (1853)

Teddington (1848–1866) was a British Thoroughbred racehorse and sire. In a career that lasted from April 1850 to October 1853 he ran eighteen times and won ten races. Teddington won important races in each of his four seasons, most notably the Derby in 1851. In the next two years he proved himself to be a formidable stayer who excelled at distances in excess of two miles, winning the Doncaster Cup in 1852 and the Emperor of Russia's Plate in 1853. He was regarded by British experts as one of the best racehorses of his era. Teddington was retired to stud at the end of the 1853 season where he had limited success before being exported to Hungary in 1862.

== Background ==
Teddington was a light yellow-chestnut horse standing just over 15 hands high with a white blaze and two white socks. He was described as having an "expressive, blood-like head" and a particularly fine action, but being otherwise an unimpressive specimen. He had a slight deformity of one of his front feet which was described as "clubby" and needed to be corrected with specially made shoes. He was bred by Jack Tomlinson, a Huntingdon blacksmith, and bought for 250 guineas as a foal by Sir Joseph Hawley. Hawley, who owned the colt in partnership with John Massey Stanley, sent him into training with his private trainer Alec Taylor Sr. at Fyfield, Hampshire.

Teddington was the first Classic winner to be sired by Orlando, the winner of the controversial 1844 Derby. At stud Orlando also sired the 2000 Guineas winners Fitz-Roland, Diophantus and Fazzoletto as well as Eclipse, through whom his sire line was successful in the United States.

== Racing career ==
=== 1850: two-year-old season ===
Teddington was not an easy horse to manage, so that Taylor had to ride him personally in his early training gallops. When the colt easily defeated a horse named Slang, who was a year older, in a private trial race in March 1850, it was clear that he had considerable ability. Teddington made his racecourse debut in spring when he finished unplaced in a Sweepstakes at Newmarket and then ran third to Marlborough Buck in the Woodcote Stakes at Epsom. In July, he recorded his first win when taking the Chesterfield Stakes at Newmarket from eight opponents. At Goodwood later in the month he finished third to Phlegra in the Eglington Stakes and then won a two-runner race for the Molecomb Stakes on the following day.

=== 1851: three-year-old season ===
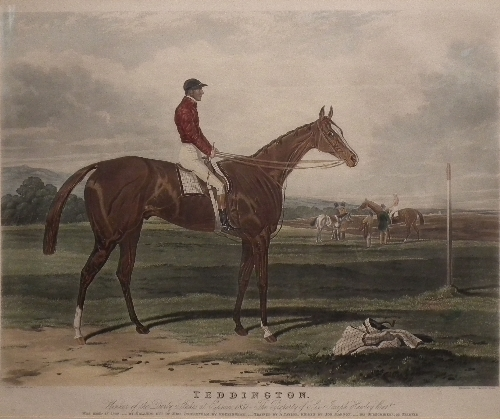
Teddington depicted in an etching by Charles Hunt

On his first appearance as a three-year-old, Teddington won a Sweepstakes at Newmarket in April. More significant, however, was a private trial race at Fyfield in which he gave six pounds and a beating to Vatican, a five-year-old who had finished third in the 1849 St Leger. His preparation for the Derby was interrupted shortly afterwards however, as he sustained a leg injury which became infected and restricted his training. The injury responded to treatment, but when moved to Epsom he lost his appetite and would only "pick the split peas from a little corn" in the final build-up to the Derby.

At Epsom on 21 May Teddington started the 3/1 favourite for the Derby in a field of thirty-three runners. Marlborough Buck was second favourite on 7/2 with the 2000 Guineas winner Hernandez the 7/1 third choice. Ridden by Job Marson, Teddington tracked the leaders before moving into the lead "with a decided leap" after half a mile. From that point on he appeared to be in complete command of the race and after being briefly challenged in the straight he pulled clear to win easily ("in a canter") by two lengths from Marlborough Buck.

He was sent to Doncaster in September, but did not contest the St Leger, instead walking over in Don Stakes. On 16 October he ran against Mountain Deer in a £1,000 match race at level weights over ten furlongs at Newmarket. Teddington held a narrow lead from the start, but Mountain Deer launched a strong challenge to move up nearly level inside the final furlong. Marson was forced to resort to using his whip and spurs and Teddington responded "gallantly" to win by half a length. Together with the match between The Flying Dutchman and Voltigeur in spring, the race was credited with renewing an interest in match races in Britain. His winnings of £7,165 made him the highest earner of the British season.

=== 1852: four-year-old season ===
On 25 March 1852, Teddington ran fourth, attempting to give sixty-four pounds to a three-year-old called Poodle, in the two-mile Northamptonshire Stakes and then ran a close third in the Newmarket Handicap on 13 April, conceding forty-seven pounds to the winner.

At Goodwood he finished third to the three-year-olds Kingston (receiving twenty-five pounds) and Little Harry (receiving thirty-two pounds) in the Goodwood Cup, beaten half a length and three-quarters of a length after a "fine race". He and then walked over for a £200 prize later in the meeting.

Teddington returned to winning form to take Warwick Cup on 8 September at Warwick where he started 11/10 favourite against three opponents. Ridden by Nat Flatman he won by a head from Little Harry to whom he was conceding thirty-two pounds. On his final start of the year he met Kingston again in the Doncaster Cup. On this occasion he was set to concede nineteen pounds to the three-year-old and the race appeared to be a virtual match, with the other runners largely ignored in the betting. As expected, Teddington and Kingston dominated the closing stages and after a "beautiful race" it was Teddington who prevailed by a neck.

=== 1853: five-year-old season ===
On his first run as a five-year-old, Teddington ran in the Emperor of Russia's Plate at Ascot. His main rival was the four-year-old Stockwell, the winner of the 2000 Guineas and St Leger, to whom he was conceding nine pounds. The race on the Thursday of the Royal Meeting attracted a huge crowd including Queen Victoria and the Prince of Wales. Teddington was held up towards the rear of the seven horse field before making steady progress to move into second place in the straight. In the final furlong Marson finally produced Teddington's challenge and he overtook Stockwell with a "tremendous burst of speed" to go a length clear. The last strides proved dramatic as Teddington abruptly swerved to the left and lost ground before Marson straightened him up to win by a head. Teddington's success was a very popular one, and he returned to the winner's enclosure to receive a reception the like of which had "seldom echoed round Ascot Heath." The race was the last under that name: the outbreak of the Crimean War resulted in the event being run in future as the Ascot Gold Cup.

11 October at Newmarket he contested the Cesarewitch Handicap for which he was assigned top weight of 133 pounds. He finished unplaced behind Haco, a three-year-old carrying 82 pounds. Later that afternoon he appeared in The Whip, a challenge race over four miles in which he carried 140 pounds and finished second, beaten six lengths by Kingston in what proved to be his final appearance.

== Assessment ==
In May 1886 The Sporting Times carried out a poll of one hundred racing experts to create a ranking of the best British racehorses of the 19th century. Teddington was ranked twentieth, having been placed in the top ten by thirteen of the contributors. He was the third highest-rated Derby winner of the 1850s behind West Australian and Thormanby.

== Stud career ==
Teddington was not a great success a stallion, but he did sire Mayonnaise, the winner of the 1859 1000 Guineas. He is present in the pedigrees of modern Thoroughbred through his daughter Marigold, who produced Doncaster, a Derby winner who became an important sire. Teddington was sold for £1,700 in 1861 and exported to Austria Hungary. His journey proved eventful, as he fell into Antwerp harbour when being unloaded from a steamboat and was only rescued after a half-hour struggle. He eventually arrived safely at his new home and lived at the Imperial Stud at Kisber until his death in autumn 1866.

== Pedigree ==
Pedigree of Teddington (GB), chestnut stallion, 1848
Sire Orlando (GB) 1841	Touchstone; 1831	Camel	Whalebone
Sire Orlando (GB) 1841	Touchstone; 1831	Camel	Selim mare*
Sire Orlando (GB) 1841	Touchstone; 1831	Banter	Master Henry
Sire Orlando (GB) 1841	Touchstone; 1831	Banter	Boadicea
Sire Orlando (GB) 1841	Vulture; 1833	Langar	Selim*
Sire Orlando (GB) 1841	Vulture; 1833	Langar	Walton mare
Sire Orlando (GB) 1841	Vulture; 1833	Kite	Bustard
Sire Orlando (GB) 1841	Vulture; 1833	Kite	Olympia
Dam Miss Twickenham (GB) 1838	Rockingham; 1830	Humphrey Clinker	Comus
Dam Miss Twickenham (GB) 1838	Rockingham; 1830	Humphrey Clinker	Clinkerina
Dam Miss Twickenham (GB) 1838	Rockingham; 1830	Medora	Swordsman
Dam Miss Twickenham (GB) 1838	Rockingham; 1830	Medora	Trumpator mare
Dam Miss Twickenham (GB) 1838	Electress; 1819	Election	Gohanna
Dam Miss Twickenham (GB) 1838	Electress; 1819	Election	Chestnut Skim
Dam Miss Twickenham (GB) 1838	Electress; 1819	Stamford mare	Stamford
Dam Miss Twickenham (GB) 1838	Electress; 1819	Stamford mare	Miss Judy (Family:2-t)

* Teddington is inbred 5S x 4S to the stallion Selim, meaning that he appears fifth generation (via Selim mare) and fourth generation on the sire side of his pedigree.
