= Young Traveller =

British Thoroughbred racehorse

- Sire: King Fergus
- Grandsire: Eclipse
- Dam: Young Trunnion mare
- Damsire: Young Trunnion
- Sex: Stallion
- Foaled: 1788
- Country: Kingdom of Great Britain
- Colour: Chestnut
- Breeder: John Hutchinson
- Owner: John Hutchinson; H. Hamilton Esq.
- Trainer: John Hutchinson
- Record: 9: 7-1-1

Major wins
- St Leger Stakes (1791); Doncaster Cup (1791); King's Plate at Edinburgh (1792)

Young Traveller (later known as Lauderdale, foaled 1788) was a British Thoroughbred racehorse best known for winning the classic St Leger Stakes in 1791. Bred and originally campaigned in Yorkshire he won two of his three races as an unnamed three-year-old in 1791. On the day after his classic victory he defeated an unusually strong field of older horse to become the first St Leger winner to also win the Doncaster Cup. In the following year he was sold, renamed and raced mainly in Scotland, winning a further five races (including three walkovers) before the end of his racing career. Young Traveller does not appear to have been used as a breeding stallion.

== Background ==
Young Traveller was a chestnut horse sired by King Fergus out of an unnamed daughter of Young Trunnion. He was bred, and originally owned and trained by John Hutchinson of Shipton, North Yorkshire. Hutchinson began his career as a stable lad before using his earnings in a brief, but lucrative career as a jockey to set himself up as a trainer. He later became one of the leading owners and breeders in the north of England, being associated with many successful horses including Hambletonian and Beningbrough.

The name Traveller had previously been used for a leading racehorse and stallion of the mid 18th century and for a successful racehorse bred by Hutchinson in 1785 and later sold to the Prince of Wales. It seems likely that the St Leger winner was named in imitation of the latter horse.

== Racing career ==
=== 1791: three-year-old season ===
Until 1913, there was no requirement for British racehorses to have official names, and the horse who later became known as Young Traveller (and Lauderdale) competed in 1791 as Mr. Hutchinson's ch. c. by King Fergus .

The unnamed colt began his racing career on 1 June at York Racecourse where he finished third behind Roman and Rosalind in a sweepstakes over one and a half miles. Hutchinson's colt was still without a name when he was one of eight three-year-olds to contest the St Leger over two miles at Doncaster Racecourse. Ridden by John Jackson he won the classic from the favourite Huby, a colt owned by Giles Crompton. The winner's odds were not recorded. On the following day, the colt was matched against older horses in the Gold Cup, the eight-runner field for which included four St Leger winners: Hutchinson's colt, Ambidexter (1790), Pewett (1789) and Spadille (1787) the favourite. The nameless colt won the race from Spadille, with Ambidexter fourth and Pewett seventh.

Although he had never raced under the name, Hutchinson's colt appears to have become known as Young Traveller before the end of the year.

=== 1792: four-year-old season ===
Before the start of the 1792 season Young Traveller was sold to H. Hamilton Esq and sent to compete in Scotland. On his way north he ran at Newcastle Racecourse in June and recorded walkover wins in two races when no other horse appeared to oppose him. A week later he arrived at Lamberton in the Scottish Borders where he walked over for another race, this time under his new name Lauderdale.

Lauderdale had his first competitive races of the year at Edinburgh Racecourse in July. He first ran in a King's Plate, a race scheduled for a series of four-mile heats, with the prize going to the first horse to win twice. Lauderdale settled the event by winning the first two heats from Mr Baird's mare Laura, his only opponent. On the following afternoon he won both heats of a 50 guinea race, beating Baird's horse Ratler. Lauderdale's last recorded race was a 50 guinea event at Kelso Racecourse in September in which he was opposed by Baird's mare Louisa. Lauderdale finished second to Louisa in the first heat, won the second, and was beaten by the mare in the deciding heat.

== Stud career ==
Lauderdale/Young Traveller never appeared on the lists of stallions whose services were advertised in the Racing Calendar, and he has no offspring listed in the General Stud Book. He may have died of natural causes or been euthanised after his final race, although it is possible that he was gelded and used as a hack or hunter.

== Pedigree ==
Pedigree of Young Traveller (GB), chestnut stallion, 1788
| Sire King Fergus (GB) 1775 | Eclipse; 1764 | Marske | Squirt |
| Sire King Fergus (GB) 1775 | Eclipse; 1764 | Marske | The Ruby Mare |
| Sire King Fergus (GB) 1775 | Eclipse; 1764 | Spilletta | Regulus |
| Sire King Fergus (GB) 1775 | Eclipse; 1764 | Spilletta | Mother Western |
| Sire King Fergus (GB) 1775 | Creeping Polly; 1756 | Othello | Crab* |
| Sire King Fergus (GB) 1775 | Creeping Polly; 1756 | Othello | Miss Slamerkin |
| Sire King Fergus (GB) 1775 | Creeping Polly; 1756 | Fanny | Tartar |
| Sire King Fergus (GB) 1775 | Creeping Polly; 1756 | Fanny | Starling mare |
| Dam Young Trunnion mare (GB) 1780 | Young Trunnion; 1755 | Cade | Godolphin Arabian* |
| Dam Young Trunnion mare (GB) 1780 | Young Trunnion; 1755 | Cade | Roxana |
| Dam Young Trunnion mare (GB) 1780 | Young Trunnion; 1755 | Meynell* | Partner |
| Dam Young Trunnion mare (GB) 1780 | Young Trunnion; 1755 | Meynell* | Greyhound mare |
| Dam Young Trunnion mare (GB) 1780 | Blank mare 1760 | Blank | Godolphin Arabian* |
| Dam Young Trunnion mare (GB) 1780 | Blank mare 1760 | Blank | Amorett |
| Dam Young Trunnion mare (GB) 1780 | Blank mare 1760 | Rib mare | Rib*^ |
| Dam Young Trunnion mare (GB) 1780 | Blank mare 1760 | Rib mare | Meynell* (Family:12-c) |

* Young Traveller is inbred 3D x 4D to the mare Meynell, meaning that she appears third generation and fourth generation on the dam side of his pedigree.

* Young Traveller is inbred 4D x 4D to the stallion Godolphin Arabian, meaning that he appears fourth generation twice on the dam side of his pedigree.

*^ Young Traveller is inbred 4S x 5D to the stallion Crab, meaning that he appears fourth generation on the sire side of his pedigree and fifth generation (via Rib)^ on the dam side of his pedigree.
