= John Mangle =

English jockey and trainer

Personal information
- Born: 1751 Hauxwell, near Leyburn, North Yorkshire
- Died: 1 January 1831 (aged 79–80) Middleham, North Yorkshire
- Occupation: Jockey

Horse racing career
- Sport: Horse racing

Major racing wins
- Major race wins: St Leger Stakes (1780, 1786, 1787, 1788, 1792)

Significant horses
- Paragon, Ruler, Spadille, Tartar, Young Flora

John Mangle (1751–1831) was an English flat racing jockey and trainer, who was five time winning rider in the St Leger Stakes.

He served his riding apprenticeship with Isaac Cape in Middleham, North Yorkshire, before joining John Hoyle's stable. He married Hoyle's daughter Hannah and took over the stable when Hoyle died, employing John Jackson and Ben Smith as jockeys.

He went on to both train and ride the winners of three consecutive St Legers – Paragon in 1786, Spadille in 1787 and Young Flora in 1788, all for Lord Archibald Hamilton. A further potential winner, Zango, was disqualified after passing the post first in 1789. Off the back of these successes, he built a second stable nearby at Brecongill. Blindness forced him to retire from training and he died at Middleham on 1 January 1831.

As a younger man, he had the nickname "Crying Jackie" for his tendency to cry after losing.

== Major wins ==
(United Kingdom) Great Britain

- St Leger Stakes – Ruler (1780), Paragon (1786), Spadille (1787), Young Flora (1788), Tartar (1792)

== See also ==
- List of jockeys

== Bibliography ==
- Mortimer, Roger; Onslow, Richard; Willett, Peter (1978). Biographical Encyclopaedia of British Racing. London: Macdonald and Jane's. ISBN 0-354-08536-0.
- Tanner, Michael; Cranham, Gerry (1992). Great Jockeys of the Flat. Enfield, Middlesex: Guinness Publishing. ISBN 0-85112-989-7.
