= Pewett =

British Thoroughbred racehorse

- Sire: Tandem
- Grandsire: Syphon
- Dam: Termagant
- Damsire: Tantrum
- Sex: Mare
- Foaled: 1786
- Country: Kingdom of Great Britain
- Colour: Bay
- Breeder: William Fitzwilliam, 4th Earl Fitzwilliam
- Owner: William Fitzwilliam, 4th Earl Fitzwilliam
- Trainer: Christopher Scaife
- Record: 13: 5-4-2

Major wins
- St Leger Stakes (1789); Match against Bywell (1790)

Pewett (1786 – after 1812) was a British Thoroughbred racehorse and broodmare best known for winning the classic St Leger Stakes in 1789. Her name was spelled in various ways including Pewet, Pewit and Pewitt and would appear to be a reference to the northern lapwing. In a racing career which lasted from May 1789 and May 1792 she won four of her thirteen races. In the St Leger she finished second to a colt named Zanga, but was awarded the race when the winner was disqualified for causing interference. After her retirement from racing she became a successful broodmare whose descendants won many important races throughout the nineteenth and twentieth centuries.

== Background ==
Pewett was a bay mare bred by her owner William Fitzwilliam, 4th Earl Fitzwilliam. She was the third of eleven foals produced by Termagant, a mare bred by Lord Rockingham. Her sire Tandem was prevented from racing by injury but proved a reasonably successful stallion when based at Richard Tattersall's stud at Highflyer Hall. Apart from Pewett, his most notable offspring was The Yellow Filly, winner of the Oaks Stakes in 1786.

== Racing career ==
=== 1789: three-year-old season ===
"Pewet" made her racecourse debut on 5 May at Malton when she started favourite for a sweepstakes over one and a half miles and won from the colts Bolus and Telescope. The filly did not reappear until 22 September when she was one of six three-year-olds to contest the St Leger over two miles at Doncaster Racecourse. Ridden by William Wilson she finished second to the Duke of Hamilton's black colt by Laurel (later named Zanga), but was awarded the victory when the judge's decided that the colt's jockey had been guilty of "jostling". On her only other start of the season she returned to Malton on 13 October and finished second to Lord Archibald Hamilton's bay colt by Highflyer (later named Walnut).

=== 1790: four-year-old season ===
In 1790, Pewett again began her season at Malton in May, when she started favourite for a four-mile sweepstakes and won from five opponents. Six days later at York she finished second Lord Archibald Hamilton's five-year-old horse Scorpion in a race over two miles. At the next York meeting in August she met Walnut for the second time in a four-mile subscription race and again finished runner-up to the colt. In September the filly ran at Lincoln Racecourse in a King's Plate for fillies and mares run in a series of two-mile heats, with the prize going to the first horse to win twice. She finished third in the first heat and second in the next two as the event was won by Sir F. Poole's Jemima. Later that month she returned to the scene of her classic success when she ran a match race over two miles against Bywell. Pewett was opposed in the betting but won the match to claim a prize of 200 guineas.

=== 1791: five-year-old season ===
Pewett won one of her four races in 1791. She did not compete until 7 September when she was beaten by Mr Garforth's mare Camilla in a King's Plate at Richmond. A week later at Wakefield racecourse she ran in a £50 race over four miles: she finished fourth in the first heat but won the next two to record her final victory. At Doncaster at the end of the month she finished sixth of the seven runners behind Young Traveller in the Doncaster Cup and last of three behind Walnut in the Doncaster Stakes later the same afternoon.

=== 1792: six-year-old season ===
Pewett made one appearance as a six-year-old, finishing last in a sweepstakes over two miles at York on 21 May.

== Stud career ==
Pewett was retired to become a broodmare for Lord Fitzwilliam and produced nine foals:

- 1794, bay filly sired by Phoenomenon
- 1796, bay filly by King Fergus
- 1797, Lapwing, bay filly by Overton
- 1798, bay filly by Standard
- 1799, Woodpecker, bay colt by Buzzard
- 1802, Sir Paul, bay colt by Sir Peter Teazle, third in the 1805 St Leger
- 1803, brown filly by Stamford
- 1804, Paulina, bay filly by Sir Peter Teazle, won the 1807 St Leger
- 1812, Clinkerina, brown filly by Clinker

Paulina was Pewett's most successful racehorse and became an influential broodmare, being regarded as Foundation mare of Thoroughbred family 8-e. Her descendants included the classic winning colts Andover and Sir Tatton Sykes.

Pewett's last foal Clinkerina also became a successful and influential broodmares. Her son Humphrey Clinker sired the St Leger winner Rockingham and Melbourne, sire of the Triple Crown winner West Australian. Her more distant descendants included Exhibitionnist, Youth and Eishin Flash.

== Pedigree ==
Pedigree of Pewett (GB), bay mare, 1786
| Sire Tandem (GB) 1773 | Syphon; 1750 | Squirt | Bartlett's Childers |
| Sire Tandem (GB) 1773 | Syphon; 1750 | Squirt | sister to Old Country Wench |
| Sire Tandem (GB) 1773 | Syphon; 1750 | Patriot mare | Bolton Patriot |
| Sire Tandem (GB) 1773 | Syphon; 1750 | Patriot mare | Crab mare |
| Sire Tandem (GB) 1773 | Regulus mare 1762 | Regulus | Godolphin Arabian |
| Sire Tandem (GB) 1773 | Regulus mare 1762 | Regulus | Grey Robinson |
| Sire Tandem (GB) 1773 | Regulus mare 1762 | Snip mare | Snip |
| Sire Tandem (GB) 1773 | Regulus mare 1762 | Snip mare | Cottingham mare |
| Dam Termagant (GB) 1772 | Tantrum; 1760 | Cripple | Godolphin Arabian |
| Dam Termagant (GB) 1772 | Tantrum; 1760 | Cripple | Godolphin Blossom |
| Dam Termagant (GB) 1772 | Tantrum; 1760 | Childers mare | Hampton Court Childers |
| Dam Termagant (GB) 1772 | Tantrum; 1760 | Childers mare | Hackney's dam |
| Dam Termagant (GB) 1772 | Cantatrice; 1767 | Sampson | Blaze |
| Dam Termagant (GB) 1772 | Cantatrice; 1767 | Sampson | Hip mare |
| Dam Termagant (GB) 1772 | Cantatrice; 1767 | Regulus mare (1757) | Regulus |
| Dam Termagant (GB) 1772 | Cantatrice; 1767 | Regulus mare (1757) | The Ruby Mare (Family:8-a) |

- Pewett was inbred 3 x 4 to Regulus, meaning that this stallion appears in both the third and fourth generations of his pedigree. She was also inbred 4 x 4 to the Godolphin Arabian.
