= Rockingham (horse) =

British Thoroughbred racehorse

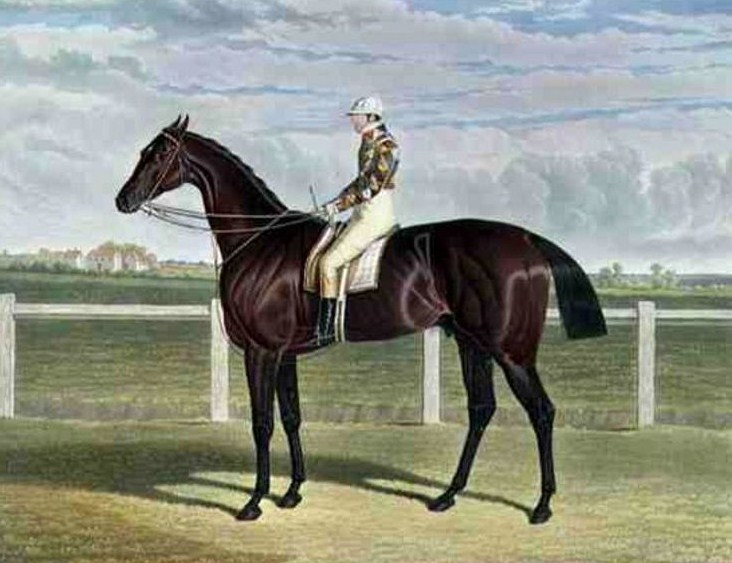
- 'Rockingham', the Winner of the Great St. Leger Stakes at Doncaster, 1833 by John Frederick Herring, Sr.
- Sire: Humphrey Clinker
- Grandsire: Comus
- Dam: Medora
- Damsire: Swordsman
- Sex: Stallion
- Foaled: 1830
- Country: United Kingdom
- Colour: Bay or Brown
- Breeder: William Allen
- Owner: Mr Vansittart; Richard Watt; J. Theobald
- Trainer: Richard Shepherd
- Record: 20: 11-4-0

Major wins
- The Shorts (1833); St Leger Stakes (1833); Doncaster Cup (1833); Brighton Gold Cup (1834, 1835, 1836); King's Plate (Hampton) (1834); King's Plate (Guildford) (1834); King's Plate (Canterbury) (1834); Goodwood Cup (1835); King's Plate (Lewes) (1835)

Rockingham (1830 – after 1851) was a British Thoroughbred racehorse and sire best known for winning the classic St Leger Stakes in 1833. After finishing fourth on his only appearance as a two-year-old, the colt was undefeated in three starts in 1833, winning the St Leger in the harlequin colours of Richard Watt and taking the Doncaster Cup against older horses in the same week. Rockingham remained in training for three further seasons, winning the 1835 Goodwood Cup, four King's Plates, and three consecutive renewals of the Brighton Gold Cup. He was retired from racing for a brief stud career, but had little success as a sire of winners.

== Background ==
Rockingham was described (by his owners) as "a beautiful rich brown horse... 16 hand high, of great muscular power, bone and substance". The American Turf Register referred to him as being of "very remarkable size and symmetry", while the Sporting Magazine called him "as powerful as a coach-horse" with "all the activity of a "pony". He was bred at Malton in Yorkshire by William Allen (the breeder of the St Leger winner Rowton) and was the ninth live foal produced by the Irish-bred mare Medora, a descendant of Prunella's sister Peppermint. Rockingham was the only classic winner sired by Humphrey Clinker, a successful racehorse who was beginning to make an impact as a stallion when he died in 1834.

== Racing career ==
=== 1832: two-year-old season ===
Originally racing in the colours of Mr Vansittart, Rockingham's racing career began on 20 September at the St Leger meeting at Doncaster Racecourse. He started at odds of 6/1 against eleven opponents in a sweepstakes for two-year-olds and finished fourth behind Belshazzar, a colt owned by Richard Watt.

=== 1833: three-year-old season ===
Early in 1833 Rockingham was reportedly sold for 1,000 guineas to his trainer Richard Shepherd, of Langton Wold but by the time he ran again he was in the ownership of Richard Watt. The colt was not entered in The Derby, but by March he was already among the favourites for the St Leger. On 14 May, Rockingham made his first appearance as a three-year-old in "The Shorts", a one-mile sweepstakes at the York spring meeting. Ridden by Sam Darling, he won from Mr Orde's colt Dancing-master. He was not particularly impressive, but retained his position as a leading contender for the St Leger on the strength of reports from private trial races which had shown him to be superior to his stable companion Belshazzar.

Rockingham was withdrawn from his engagement at the York August meeting, and did not reappear on the racecourse until he contested the St Leger at Doncaster on 17 September. In a field of twenty runners, he was the fifth choice in the betting at odds of 7/1, with Muley Moloch starting the 5/2 favourite ahead of Belshazzar on 3/1. With Darling again in the saddle, he was held up at the back of the field as Belshazzar set an unusually slow pace. Darling moved the colt gradually closer to the leaders in the straight, but appeared to be blocked behind the front rank of horses. A furlong from the finish, Darling found a gap for his horse, and Rockingham accelerated past Mr Walker's colt Mussulman to win very easily by two lengths. The unusually slow winning time and the fact that most of the runners finished closely grouped behind the winner led the Sporting Magazine to conclude that the race had been a sub-standard renewal of the classic. Two days after his win in the St Leger, Rockingham was matched against older horses in the Doncaster Cup over a distance of two miles, five furlongs. Ridden by T. Nicholson, he started favourite and won from his fellow three-year-old Revenge, with the five-year-old Consol in third.

=== 1834: four-year-old season ===
Before the start of the 1834 season, Rockingham was sold for 1000 guineas to Mr Wall and then acquired by Mr Theobald who sent him to compete in the south of England. He made his first appearance in the two and a half mile Gold Cup at Ascot Racecourse on 12 June. He started a 12/1 outsider but finished strongly to be second of the ten runners behind the favourite Glaucus and there was some criticism of his jockey, Jem Chapple, who had given the colt a great deal of ground to make up in the closing stages. A week after his run at Ascot, Rockingham appeared at the Hampton and Molesey Hurst meeting near the border of Middlesex and Surrey. He ran in a King's Plate, a long-distance race run in a series of heats, with the prize going to the first horse to win twice. Rockingham won the first heat and was then able to walk over for the second after his three opponents were withdrawn. Five days later he claimed another King's Plate, winning in two two-mile heats at Guildford. On 31 July he appeared in the Gold Cup at Goodwood Racecourse where he finished unplaced behind the three-year-old Glencoe. Eight days later he ran in the Gold Cup at Brighton Racecourse and won at odds of 2/5 from his only opponent. On 13 August at Lewes he started favourite for a King's Plate but finished second in both heats to Famine, a three-year-old daughter of Humphrey Clinker, despite being ridden "very severely" by Chapple. Rockingham's last race of the season came at Canterbury on 27 August where he won his third King's Plate of the year by beating Captain Ricardo's six-year-old Vestris in two heats.

=== 1835: five-year-old season ===
Rockingham began his 1835 campaign in the Goodwood Cup on 30 July. Ridden by Jem Robinson he started at odds of 5/1 and won from Glaucus and the 1832 Epsom Derby winner St. Giles. On the following afternoon he started favourite for a King's Plate over three miles five furlongs, but was beaten by a three-year-old colt named Lucifer, to whom he was conceding thirty-seven pounds. In an extraordinary race Rockingham went many lengths clear of his opponent and looked set to win easily. Robinson, believing that he had the race won, eased the horse down sixty yards from the finish, only to be overtaken and beaten on the line, provoking "roars of laughter" from the crowd. Rockingham's brief season ended with two wins in Sussex in August. He won his second Gold Cup at Brighton and then won the King's Plate at Lewes when his only opponent, Lord Exeter's mare Datura, was disqualified for running "on the wrong side of the post".

=== 1836: six-year-old season ===
Rockingham began his final season in June with a second attempt at the Ascot Gold Cup, and repeated his previous effort by finishing second, this time to the five-year-old Touchstone. Although a minority believed that he had been the victim of another poor ride, most observers concluded that his best days had passed. In the following month he finished unplaced in both the Goodwood Stakes and the Goodwood Cup, carrying top weight on both occasions. Rockingham's only victory of the season came on 5 August, when he defeated Lord Exeter's four-year-old Luck's-all to take the Brighton Gold Cup for the third year in succession. His racing came to an end a week later when he finished unplaced under a weight of 137 pounds in the Lewes Stakes.

== Stud career ==
Rockingham was expected to be a successful breeding stallion and began his stud career in 1837 at Stockwell in Surrey, at a fee of 20 guineas. He appeared in the list of stallions for only four seasons and sired few winners of any consequence. Rockingham was sold in November 1841 to the Grand Duke of Mecklenburg-Schwerin and was exported by steamboat to Hamburg. He stood in Germany for the 1842 and 1843 seasons, but does not appear in subsequent Mecklenburg-Schwerin stud registers. After the Mecklenburg stud closed in 1847, Rockingham was transferred to the royal Prussian stud in Neustadt.

== Pedigree ==
Pedigree of Rockingham (GB), bay stallion, 1830
Sire Humphrey Clinker (GB) 1822	Comus; 1809	Sorcerer	Trumpator*
Sire Humphrey Clinker (GB) 1822	Comus; 1809	Sorcerer	Young Giantess
Sire Humphrey Clinker (GB) 1822	Comus; 1809	Houghton Lass	Sir Peter Teazle*
Sire Humphrey Clinker (GB) 1822	Comus; 1809	Houghton Lass	Alexina
Sire Humphrey Clinker (GB) 1822	Clinkerina; 1812	Clinker	Sir Peter Teazle*
Sire Humphrey Clinker (GB) 1822	Clinkerina; 1812	Clinker	Hyale
Sire Humphrey Clinker (GB) 1822	Clinkerina; 1812	Pewett	Tandem
Sire Humphrey Clinker (GB) 1822	Clinkerina; 1812	Pewett	Termagant
Dam Medora (IRE) 1813	Swordsman; 1796	Prizefighter	Florizel
Dam Medora (IRE) 1813	Swordsman; 1796	Prizefighter	Promise*
Dam Medora (IRE) 1813	Swordsman; 1796	Zara	Eclipse
Dam Medora (IRE) 1813	Swordsman; 1796	Zara	Squirrel mare
Dam Medora (IRE) 1813	Trumpator mare 1797	Trumpator*	Conductor
Dam Medora (IRE) 1813	Trumpator mare 1797	Trumpator*	Brunette
Dam Medora (IRE) 1813	Trumpator mare 1797	Peppermint	Highflyer
Dam Medora (IRE) 1813	Trumpator mare 1797	Peppermint	Promise* (Family:1-d)

* Rockingham is inbred 4S × 3D to the stallion Trumpator, meaning that he appears fourth generation on the sire side of his pedigree, and third generation on the dam side of his pedigree.

* Rockingham is inbred 4S × 4S to the stallion Sir Peter Teazle, meaning that he appears twice fourth generation on the sire side of his pedigree.

* Rockingham is inbred 4D × 4D to the mare Promise, meaning that he appears twice fourth generation on the dam side of his pedigree.
