= Imperatrix (horse) =

British Thoroughbred racehorse

- Sire: Alfred
- Grandsire: Matchem
- Dam: Old England mare
- Damsire: Old England
- Sex: Mare
- Foaled: 1779
- Country: Great Britain
- Colour: Chestnut
- Breeder: John Pratt
- Owner: John Pratt
- Record: 2: 1-1-0

Major wins
- St. Leger Stakes (1782)

Imperatrix (foaled 1779) was a British Thoroughbred racehorse. She raced only twice, with her only win coming in the 1782 St. Leger Stakes. She was bred and owned by John Pratt. As a broodmare, Imperatrix produced nine foals.

== Background ==
Imperatrix was a chestnut mare bred by John Pratt and foaled in 1779. She was sired by Alfred, who was a son of Matchem. Alfred won several races at Newmarket, including the Clermont Cup and Grosvenor Stakes. Imperatrix's dam was an unnamed daughter of the stallion Old England.

== Racing career ==
On 24 September 1782 at Doncaster Racecourse, Imperatrix won the two-mile St. Leger Stakes, beating Monk (the evens favourite), Nobleman and two others. In her only other race she finished second to Miss Kitty in the Port Stakes at Pickering, beating the eight other runners.

== Stud career ==
Imperatrix then became a broodmare and produced nine foals, including at least three winners. They were:

- Anvil filly – a bay filly foaled in 1790.
- Septem – a bay stallion sired by Saltram and foaled in 1792. Septem won several races including the King's Purse at Edinburgh.
- Lily – a bay mare sired by Highflyer and foaled in 1793. She won King's Purses at Newmarket and Haverford West. After retiring from racing she produced eight foals before her death in 1820, including Dimity and Bodkin, with the former producing foals herself.
- Imp – a bay filly sired by Weasel and foaled in 1795 who won races at Catterick Bridge and Blandford.
- Roarer – a bay colt by Coriander.
- Coriander filly – a bay filly foaled in 1797.
- Coriander colt – foaled in 1798.
- Coriander colt – a chestnut colt foaled in 1799.
- Sorcerer filly – a bay filly sired by Sorcerer and foaled in 1800.

There is no evidence that Imperatrix had any lasting influence on the Thoroughbred.

== Pedigree ==
Pedigree of Imperatrix, chestnut mare, 1779
Sire Alfred (GB) b. 1770	Matchem (GB) b. 1748	Cade* b. 1734	Godolphin Arabian*
Sire Alfred (GB) b. 1770	Matchem (GB) b. 1748	Cade* b. 1734	Roxana
Sire Alfred (GB) b. 1770	Matchem (GB) b. 1748	Partner mare 1735	Partner
Sire Alfred (GB) b. 1770	Matchem (GB) b. 1748	Partner mare 1735	Brown Farewell
Sire Alfred (GB) b. 1770	Snap mare (GB); 1762	Snap br. 1750	Snip
Sire Alfred (GB) b. 1770	Snap mare (GB); 1762	Snap br. 1750	Fox mare
Sire Alfred (GB) b. 1770	Snap mare (GB); 1762	Cullen Arabian mare	Cullen Arabian*
Sire Alfred (GB) b. 1770	Snap mare (GB); 1762	Cullen Arabian mare	Lady Thigh
Dam Old England mare (GB) b. 1766	Old England (GB) b. 1741	Godolphin Arabian*	(unknown)
Dam Old England mare (GB) b. 1766	Old England (GB) b. 1741	Godolphin Arabian*	(unknown)
Dam Old England mare (GB) b. 1766	Old England (GB) b. 1741	Little Hartley Mare	Bartlett's Childers
Dam Old England mare (GB) b. 1766	Old England (GB) b. 1741	Little Hartley Mare	Flying Whig
Dam Old England mare (GB) b. 1766	Cullen Arabian mare (GB) b. 1756	Cullen Arabian*	(unknown)
Dam Old England mare (GB) b. 1766	Cullen Arabian mare (GB) b. 1756	Cullen Arabian*	(unknown)
Dam Old England mare (GB) b. 1766	Cullen Arabian mare (GB) b. 1756	Miss Cade ch. 1750	Cade*
Dam Old England mare (GB) b. 1766	Cullen Arabian mare (GB) b. 1756	Miss Cade ch. 1750	Miss Makeless

Note: b. = Bay, br. = Brown, ch. = Chestnut

* Imperatrix was inbred 3x4 to Cade, the Godolphin Arabian and the Cullen Arabian. This means that all three stallions appear once in the third generation and once in the fourth generation of her pedigree.
