= William (horse) =

British-bred Thoroughbred racehorse

- Sire: Governor
- Grandsire: Trumpator
- Dam: Elizabeth
- Damsire: Spadille
- Sex: Stallion
- Foaled: 1811
- Country: United Kingdom
- Colour: Bay
- Breeder: Archibald Hamilton, 9th Duke of Hamilton
- Owner: Archibald Hamilton, 9th Duke of Hamilton
- Trainer: William Theakston
- Record: 8: 4-2-1

Major wins
- St Leger Stakes (1814); Gascoigne Stakes (1814)

William (foaled 1811) was a British Thoroughbred racehorse best known for winning the classic St Leger Stakes in 1814. In a racing career which lasted from May 1813 until May 1815 he contested eight races and won four times. After winning his last two starts as a two-year-old, he fell on his first appearance of 1814 and was beaten in his next race before winning the St Leger at odds of 7/1. He was beaten in his only race as a four-year-old and was sold and gelded before returning for two unsuccessful efforts in 1817.

== Background ==
William was a bay horse bred by his owner Archibald Hamilton, 9th Duke of Hamilton and was the last of the Duke's seven St Leger winners. William was the only classic winner sired by Governor, a horse who stood as a stallion at Leigh, near Cricklade in Wiltshire at a fee of five guineas. William's dam, one of many Thoroughbred mares named Elizabeth, was a granddaughter of Pastorella, a half-sister to the 1780 Epsom Derby winner Diomed.

== Racing career ==
=== 1813: two-year-old season ===
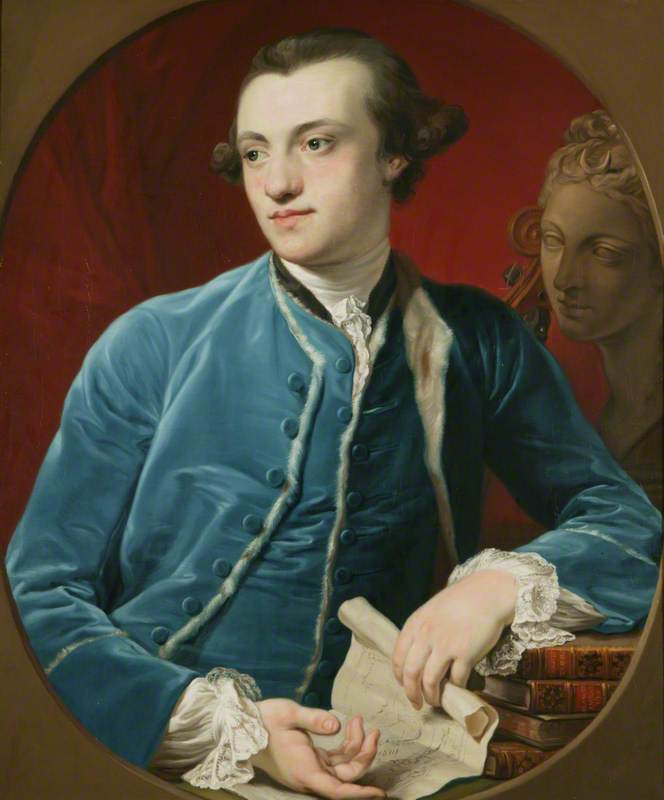
The Duke of Hamilton, who bred and owned William

The future classic winner's racing career began at York Racecourse on 26 May 1813. He started at odd of 4/1 for a sweepstakes in which he finished second to Richard Watt's filly Alfana. Three months later, William and Alfana met again in a sweepstakes over the same course and distance, and the colt recorded his first success by beating the filly and two others "very easy". At the Doncaster St Leger meeting in September started favourite for a sweepstakes over the T.Y.C (two-year-old course) and won from five opponents.

=== 1814: three-year-old season ===
William's three-year-old debut was a dramatic and unfortunate one. He was entered in the Dee Stakes at Chester Racecourse on 4 May and as he entered the straight he appeared poised to win easily from his only opponent. At this point he was "thrown down" by a spectator who had walked onto the course. The spectator was killed and William's jockey, Ben Smith was seriously injured, forcing him to miss the rest of the season. The colt, however, appeared to be relatively unscathed as he ran again at York Racecourse less than two weeks later. He started 6/4 favourite for a one-mile sweepstakes, but finished third of the five runners behind Belville and King David.

After a five-month break, William was one of twelve colts and fillies to contest the thirty-ninth running of the St Leger at Doncaster Racecourse. Ridden by John Shepherd he was the 7/1 fourth choice in the betting. The favourite, at odds of 5/2, was an unnamed grey filly owned by Henry Peirse: this filly subsequently became an influential broodmare and was the older sister of Ebor who won the St Leger in 1817. William won the classic from Lord Strathmore's Heart of Oak, the only other runner officially place by the judge. Two days after his classic victory, William walked over in the Gascoigne Stakes over the same course and distance, after the other runners, including Heart of Oak, were withdrawn by their owners.

=== 1815: four-year-old season ===
William remained in training as a four-year-old but made only one appearance. On 31 May he started at odds of 2/1 for the Constitution Stakes over one and a quarter miles at York and finished second to Lord Scarborough's six-year-old Catton.

=== 1817: six-year-old season ===
William did not race in 1816, and by the time of his reappearance as a six-year-old in 1817 he had been gelded and had entered into the ownership of Mr Beardsworth. At Walsall on 24 September he finished last of the three runners in the first heat of a £50 race and was withdrawn from the deciding heat. Five days later he finished seventh in both heats of similar event at Burton-on-Trent.

== Pedigree ==
Pedigree of William (GB), bay stallion, 1811
| Sire Governor (GB) 1802 | Trumpator; 1782 | Conductor | Matchem |
| Sire Governor (GB) 1802 | Trumpator; 1782 | Conductor | Snap mare |
| Sire Governor (GB) 1802 | Trumpator; 1782 | Brunette | Squirrel* |
| Sire Governor (GB) 1802 | Trumpator; 1782 | Brunette | Dove |
| Sire Governor (GB) 1802 | Highflyer mare 1793 | Highflyer* | Herod* |
| Sire Governor (GB) 1802 | Highflyer mare 1793 | Highflyer* | Rachel* |
| Sire Governor (GB) 1802 | Highflyer mare 1793 | Ottheothea | Otho* |
| Sire Governor (GB) 1802 | Highflyer mare 1793 | Ottheothea | Snap mare |
| Dam Elizabeth (GB) 1802 | Spadille; 1784 | Highflyer* | Herod* |
| Dam Elizabeth (GB) 1802 | Spadille; 1784 | Highflyer* | Rachel* |
| Dam Elizabeth (GB) 1802 | Spadille; 1784 | Flora | Squirrel* |
| Dam Elizabeth (GB) 1802 | Spadille; 1784 | Flora | Angelica |
| Dam Elizabeth (GB) 1802 | Dungannon mare 1795 | Dungannon | Eclipse |
| Dam Elizabeth (GB) 1802 | Dungannon mare 1795 | Dungannon | Aspasia |
| Dam Elizabeth (GB) 1802 | Dungannon mare 1795 | Pastorella | Otho* |
| Dam Elizabeth (GB) 1802 | Dungannon mare 1795 | Pastorella | sister to Juno (Family 6-b) |

* William is inbred 3S × 3D to the stallion Highflyer, meaning that he appears third generation on the sire side of his pedigree and third generation on the dam side of his pedigree.

* William is inbred 4S × 4D to the stallion Squirrel, meaning that he appears fourth generation on the sire side of his pedigree and fourth generation on the dam side of his pedigree.

* William is inbred 4S × 4D to the stallion Otho, meaning that he appears fourth generation on the sire side of his pedigree and fourth generation on the dam side of his pedigree.
