= Theodore (horse) =

British-bred Thoroughbred racehorse

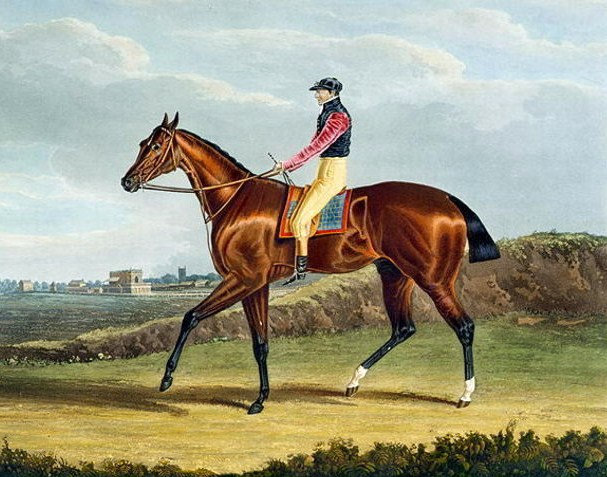
- 'Theodore', the Winner of the Great St. Leger at Doncaster, 1822 by John Frederick Herring Sr.
- Sire: Woful
- Grandsire: Waxy
- Dam: Coriander mare
- Damsire: Coriander
- Sex: Stallion
- Foaled: 1819
- Died: 1838 (aged 18–19)
- Country: United Kingdom
- Colour: Bay
- Breeder: Edward Petre
- Owner: Edward Petre; W Carleton; Mr Dobbie
- Trainer: James Croft
- Record: 22: 9-9-3
- Earnings: 2,125 guineas in 1822

Major wins
- Old Stakes (1822); York Spring St Leger (1822); XYZ Stakes (1822); Great St Leger Stakes (1822); Manchester Gold Cup (1824); Edingburgh Gold Cup (1825); Edingburgh City Members' Plate (1825)

Theodore (1819 – after 1838) was a British Thoroughbred racehorse and sire best known for winning the classic St Leger Stakes in 1822 at odds of 200/1. Trained in Yorkshire by James Croft, he won the second of his two races as a two-year-old and showed good form the following year, winning races at Catterick, York and Newcastle. His St Leger prospects, however, appeared remote after health problems and poor performances in training gallops. His upset win in the classic, followed by a poor run over the same course and distance two days later, attracted a great deal of comment and suspicions of race-fixing, although none of the allegations was ever proved.

Theodore's subsequent career was relatively undistinguished although he did win a Gold Cup at Manchester in 1825 and some minor races in Scotland the following year, before retiring with a record of nine wins from twenty-two races. He was not successful as a breeding stallion and was exported to France in 1838.

== Background ==
Theodore was a bay horse with a small white star and white socks on his hind feet. He was owned and bred by Edward Petre (1794–1848), a free-spending sportsman and gambler, who was a younger son of Robert Petre, 9th Baron Petre. Petre sent the colt into training with James Croft at Middleham.

Theodore's sire Woful was a brother of the Derby winners Whalebone and Whisker. He was also a successful stallion, siring the classic winners Arab (1000 Guineas), Zinc (1000 Guineas and Oaks Stakes) and Augusta (Oaks Stakes) before being exported to Prussia in 1832. Theodore was the last of nine foals produced by an unnamed daughter of Coriander, the seventh having been the successful racehorse and sire Blacklock.

== Racing career ==
=== 1821: two-year-old season ===
Theodore made his first appearance at York Racecourse on 21 August 1821, when he finished unplaced behind Richard Watt's filly Marion in a sweepstakes for two-year-olds. A month later he ran at the St Leger meeting at Doncaster Racecourse where he carried 80 pounds in an all-aged handicap race and finished second to the four-year-old Dunsinane. On 3 October Theodore recorded his first victory in a sweepstakes for two-year-olds at Richmond, North Yorkshire. Starting at odds of 6/1 he was ridden by Bill Scott and won "cleverly" from Lord Queensberry's colt Orator.

=== 1822: three-year-old season ===
On 11 April 1822, Theodore made his three-year-old debut in the Old Stakes at Catterick Bridge Racecourse. He started the 2/5 favourite for the two mile event and "won easy" from Sir P Musgrave's unnamed Comus colt. Theodore made his next appearance at York on 13 May when he contested the "York Spring St Leger Stakes". The success of the St Leger at Doncaster had led other major courses, including York and Newmarket to use the name for their own long-distance races for three-year-olds; the original race was renamed the "Great St Leger" for several years to distinguish itself from the imitators. Theodore won at odds of 5/4, beating Lord Scarborough's colt Regalia by one and a half lengths. In July, Theodore was sent north to run at Newcastle Racecourse in Northumberland, where he defeated two opponents to win the two mile XYZ Stakes.

On 16 September, Theodore was one of twenty-three colts and fillies to contest the forty-seventh running of the Great St Leger Stakes at Doncaster. Despite having won his last four races, he was ignored in the betting and started at odds of 100/1, while Mr Orde Powlett's colt Swap was made the 2/1 favourite. Theodore had been on offer at odds of between 20/1 and 30/1 for the race since the start of the year, but in the immediate build-up to the race all confidence in the colt disappeared after reports that he was badly lame. A few days before the race, James Croft had run Theodore in a training gallop against his three other St Leger contenders, Violet, Corinthian and a grey colt owned by the Duke of Leeds. Theodore finished last, a long way behind his stable companions and was found to be suffering from corns. His jockey, John Jackson, was so upset at being ordered to ride the colt that he allegedly burst into tears, whilst Edward Petre was said to have sold off all the bets he had made on the horse for £200 to Mr Wyvill. Jackson sent Theodore into the lead from the start, and after holding off the challenges of Pilgarlick, The Whig and Richard Watt's Mandane filly, he pulled ahead in the straight and won easily by a length from Violet (50/1) with the Duke of Leeds' colt (200/1) taking third place. The winning time was recorded as 3 minutes 23 seconds. James Croft had therefore achieved a 1-2-3 in the classic with three of the longest-priced runners. Mr Wyvill, who had bought the bets on Theodore from Petre, won £6,000 on the race.

Two days later, Theodore and Swap (who had run very poorly in the Leger) were the only runners for the Gascoigne Stakes over the same course and distance. Theodore was made the clear betting favourite but was easily defeated by his opponent.

The widely divergent form exhibited by Theodore and Swap at Doncaster led to a great deal of comment, and there were strong suspicions that one or other of the races had been a "cross". It was pointed out, however, that Swap was a temperamental and "sulky" horse who may have been unsuited by the large St Leger field. A later writer offered the view that Theodore was a good, fast horse, well-suited to the prevailing soft ground, and that his poor performance in the Gascoigne Stakes was due to his aggravating an existing injury when winning the St Leger.

=== 1823: four-year-old season ===
Theodore failed to win in three starts as a four-year-old in 1823. He began his season at Catterick Bridge on 2 April when he finished second to Mr Ferguson's colt Jonathan. After a break of more than five months, Theodore returned for two runs at the St Leger meeting in September. He finished second to Regalia when carrying top weight of 120 pounds in a handicap race on the opening day of the meeting, and then finished last of the three runners in the Doncaster Club Stakes two days later.

=== 1824: five-year-old season ===
Theodore's first engagement of 1824 was the Gold Cup at Manchester Racecourse in Lancashire on 9 June. Ridden by William Scott, he recorded his first success since the St Leger as he carried top weight of 122 pounds to victory over two opponents. Two weeks later, and carrying a three-pound weight penalty for his win at Manchester, he started favourite for the Gold Tureen at Leeds Racecourse but was beaten by Mr Ferguson's Wanton. Theodore ran twice at York's August meeting, finishing second to Sandbeck in the Fitzwilliam Stakes and third to Carnival in a division of the Great Subscription Purse. On his final start of the season he ran at the St Leger meeting for the fourth consecutive year, finishing third of the eight runners behind Mercutio and Lottery in the Gold Cup.

=== 1825: six-year-old season ===
Before the start of the 1825, Theodore entered into the ownership of Mr W. Carleton and was sent to race in Scotland where he had his greatest success since his three-year-old season. At Edinburgh Racecourse in June he won three races in four days beginning with the Edinburgh Gold Cup over three miles. His two other successes were gained in races run in heats, with the prize going to the first horse to win twice. He won both heats of the City Members Plate two days after his win in the Gold Cup and won both heats of a £50 all-aged race on the following afternoon.

In September, Theodore became the property of a Mr Dobbie and was sent further north to compete at Inverness where he finished second to Lord Kennedy's Skiff when favourite for the Trial Stakes. Theodore and Skiff met again for the Ross and Cromarty Gold Cup on the following day, but after being beaten in the first heat, Theodore was withdrawn from the second allowing his opponent to claim the 100 guinea prize. Theodore ended his racing career at Perth Racecourse in October. He was beaten by Lord Kennedy's four-year-old North Briton in the first heat of a £50 plate and was withdrawn from the second.

== Stud career ==
Theodore was retired from racing to become a breeding stallion but made little impact as a sire of winners. For the 1827 season he was standing at Castle Howard stud in Yorkshire at a fee of 5 guineas. He was exported to France in 1838.

== Pedigree ==
Pedigree of Theodore (GB), bay stallion, 1819
Sire Woful (GB) 1809	Waxy; 1790	Potoooooooo*	Eclipse*
Sire Woful (GB) 1809	Waxy; 1790	Potoooooooo*	Sportsmistress*
Sire Woful (GB) 1809	Waxy; 1790	Maria	Herod*
Sire Woful (GB) 1809	Waxy; 1790	Maria	Lisette
Sire Woful (GB) 1809	Penelope; 1798	Trumpator	Conductor
Sire Woful (GB) 1809	Penelope; 1798	Trumpator	Brunette
Sire Woful (GB) 1809	Penelope; 1798	Prunella	Highflyer*
Sire Woful (GB) 1809	Penelope; 1798	Prunella	Promise
Dam Coriander mare (GB) 1799	Coriander; 1786	Potoooooooo*	Eclipse*
Dam Coriander mare (GB) 1799	Coriander; 1786	Potoooooooo*	Sportsmistress*
Dam Coriander mare (GB) 1799	Coriander; 1786	Lavender	Herod*
Dam Coriander mare (GB) 1799	Coriander; 1786	Lavender	Snap mare
Dam Coriander mare (GB) 1799	Wildgoose; 1792	Highflyer*	Herod*
Dam Coriander mare (GB) 1799	Wildgoose; 1792	Highflyer*	Rachel*
Dam Coriander mare (GB) 1799	Wildgoose; 1792	Coheiress	Potoooooooo*
Dam Coriander mare (GB) 1799	Wildgoose; 1792	Coheiress	Manilla (Family: 2-t)

* Theodore is inbred 3S x 3D x 4D to the stallion Potoooooooo, meaning that he appears third generation on the sire side of his pedigree, and third generation and fourth generation on the dam side of his pedigree.

* Theodore is inbred 4S x 3D to the stallion Highflyer, meaning that he appears fourth generation on the sire side of his pedigree, and third generation on the dam side of his pedigree.

* Theodore is inbred 4S x 5S x 4D x 4D to the stallion Herod, meaning that he appears fourth generation and fifth generation (via Highflyer) on the sire side of his pedigree, and fourth generation twice on the dam side of his pedigree.
