= St Leger Stakes =

Flat horse race in Britain

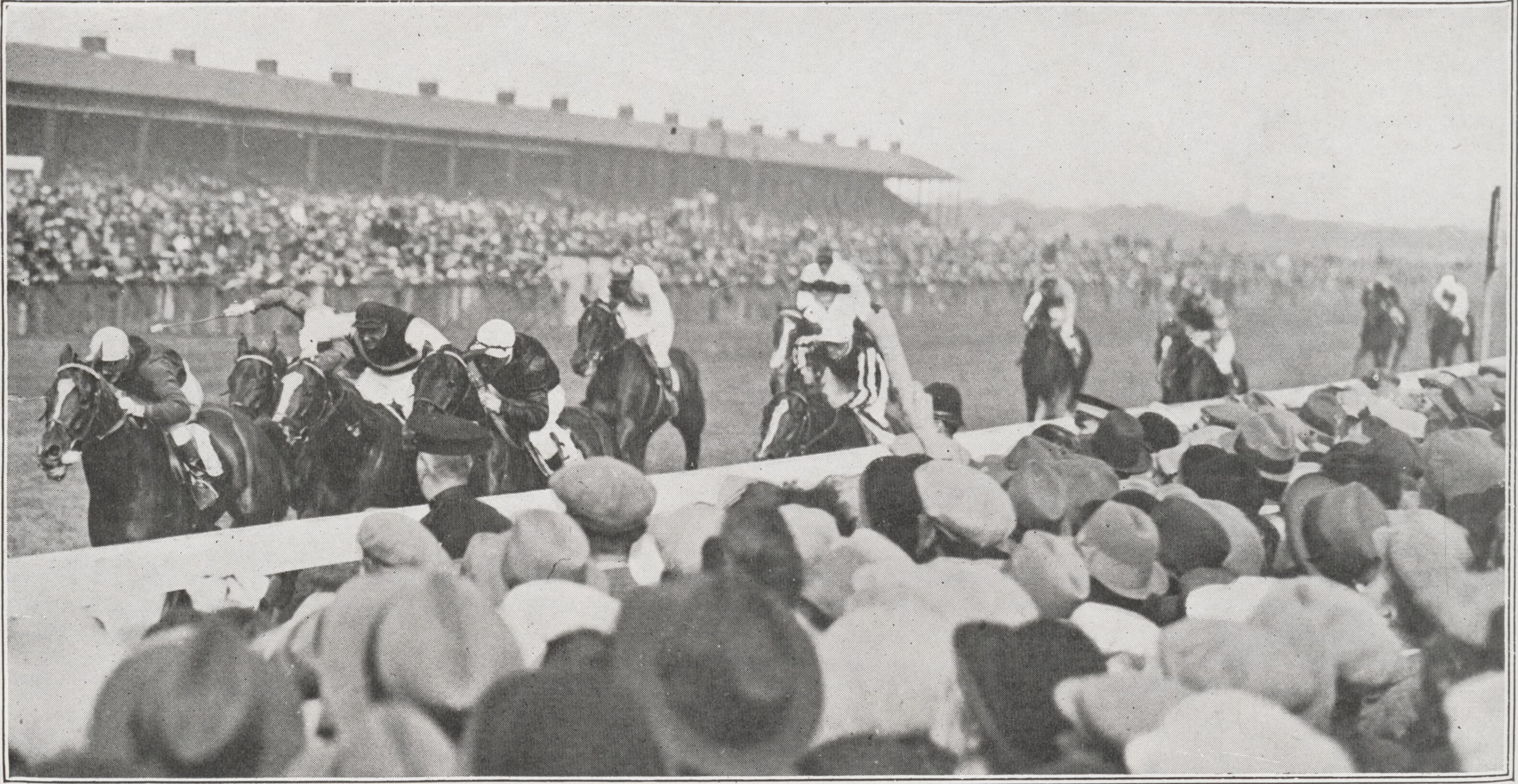
- The 1929 St Leger, won by Trigo
- Class: Group 1
- Location: Doncaster Racecourse; Doncaster, England
- Inaugurated: 1776
- Race type: Flat / Thoroughbred
- Sponsor: Betfred
- Website: www.doncaster-racecourse.co.uk

Race information
- Distance: 1m 6f 115y (2,921 m)
- Surface: Turf
- Track: Left-handed
- Qualification: Three-year-olds excluding geldings
- Weight: 9 st 3 lb Allowances; 3 lb for fillies
- Purse: £700,000 (2026); 1st: £396,970

St Leger Stakes
2026
Highwayman	Enceladus	Amelia Earhart

Previous years
2025
Scandinavia	Rahiebb	Stay True
2024
Jan Brueghel	Illinois	Sunway
2023
Continuous	Arrest	Desert Hero
2022
Eldar Eldarov	New London	Giavellotto
2021
Hurricane Lane	Mojo Star	The Mediterranean

2020-2011
2020
Galileo Chrome	Berkshire Rocco	Pyledriver
2019
Logician	Sir Ron Priestley	Nayef Road
2018
Kew Gardens	Lah Ti Dar	Southern France
2017
Capri	Crystal Ocean	Stradivarius
2016
Harbour Law	Ventura Storm	Housesofparliament
2015
Simple Verse	Bondi Beach	Fields of Athenry
2014
Kingston Hill	Romsdal	Snow Sky
2013
Leading Light	Talent	Galileo Rock
2012
Encke	Camelot	Michelangelo
2011
Masked Marvel	Brown Panther	Sea Moon

2010–2001
2010
Arctic Cosmos	Midas Touch	Corsica
2009
Mastery	Kite Wood	Monitor Closely
2008
Conduit	Unsung Heroine	Look Here
2007
Lucarno	Mahler	Honolulu
2006
Sixties Icon	The Last Drop	Red Rocks
2005
Scorpion	The Geezer	Tawqeet
2004
Rule of Law	Quiff	Tycoon
2003
Brian Boru	High Accolade	Phoenix Reach
2002
Bollin Eric	Highest	Bandari
2001
Milan	Demophilos	Mr Combustible

2000–1991
2000
Millenary	Air Marshall	Chimes at Midnight
1999
Mutafaweq	Ramruma	Adair
1998
Nedawi	High And Low	Sunshine Street
1997
Silver Patriarch	Vertical Speed	The Fly
1996
Shantou	Dushyantor	Samraan
1995
Classic Cliche	Minds Music	Istidaad
1994
Moonax	Broadway Flyer	Double Trigger
1993
Bob's Return	Armiger	Edbaysaan
1992
User Friendly	Sonus	Bonny Scot
1991
Toulon	Saddlers' Hall	Micheletti

1990–1981
1990
Snurge	Hellenic	River God
1989
Michelozzo	Sapience	Roseate Tern
1988
Minster Son	Diminuendo	Sheriff's Star
1987
Reference Point	Mountain Kingdom	Dry Dock
1986
Moon Madness	Celestial Storm	Untold
1985
Oh So Sharp	Phardante	Lanfranco
1984
Commanche Run	Baynoun	Alphabatim
1983
Sun Princess	Esprit du Nord	Carlingford Castle
1982
Touching Wood	Zilos	Diamond Shoal
1981
Cut Above	Glint of Gold	Bustomi

1980–1971
1980
Light Cavalry	Water Mill	World Leader
1979
Son of Love	Soleil Noir	Niniski
1978
Julio Mariner	Le Moss	M-Lolshan
1977
Dunfermline	Alleged	Classic Example
1976
Crow	Secret Man	Scallywag
1975
Bruni	King Pellinore	Libra's Rib
1974
Bustino	Giacometti	Riboson
1973
Peleid	Buoy	Duke of Ragusa
1972
Boucher	Our Mirage	Ginevra
1971
Athens Wood	Homeric	Falkland

1970–1961
1970
Nijinsky	Meadowville	Politico
1969
Intermezzo	Ribofilio	Prince Consort
1968
Ribero	Canterbury	Cold Storage
1967
Ribocco	Hopeful Venture	Ruysdael
1966
Sodium	Charlottown	David Jack
1965
Provoke	Meadow Court	Solstice
1964
Indiana	Patti	Soderini
1963
Ragusa	Star Moss	Fighting Ship
1962
Hethersett	Monterrico	Miralgo
1961
Aurelius	Bounteous	Dicta Drake

1960–1950
1960
St. Paddy	Die Hard	Vienna
1959
Cantelo	Fidalgo	Pindari
1958
Alcide	None Nicer	Nagami
1957
Ballymoss	Court Harwell	Brioche
1956
Cambremer	Hornbeam	French Beige
1955
Meld	Nucleus	Beau Prince
1954
Never Say Die	Elopement	Estremadur
1953
Premonition	Northern Light	Aureole
1952
Tulyar	Kingsfold	Alcinus
1951
Talma	Fraise du Bois	Medway
1950
Scratch	Vieux Manoir	Sanlinea

The St Leger Stakes is a Group 1 flat horse race in Great Britain open to three-year-old thoroughbred colts and fillies. It is run at Doncaster over a distance of 1 mile, 6 furlongs and 115 yards (2,921 metres), and it is scheduled to take place each year in September.

Established in 1776, the St Leger is the oldest of Britain's five Classic races. It is the last of the five to be run each year, and its distance is longer than any of the other four.

The St Leger is the final leg of the English Triple Crown, which begins with the 2000 Guineas and continues with the Derby. It also completes the Fillies Triple Crown, following on from the 1000 Guineas and The Oaks. The St Leger has rarely featured Triple Crown contenders in recent decades, with the only one in recent years being the 2012 2,000 Guineas and Derby winner Camelot, who finished second in the St Leger.

== History ==
=== Early years ===
The event was devised by Anthony St Leger, an army officer and politician who lived near Doncaster. It was initially referred to as "A Sweepstake of 25 Guineas", and its original distance was two miles. The rules stipulated that colts and geldings were to carry 8 st, and fillies would receive an allowance of 2 lb.

The inaugural running was held at Cantley Common on 24 September 1776. The first winner was an unnamed filly owned by the event's organiser, the 2nd Marquess of Rockingham. The filly was later named Allabaculia.

The title St Leger Stakes was decided at a dinner party held in 1778 at the Red Lion Inn located in the Market Place, Doncaster, to discuss the coming year's race. It was suggested that it should be called the Rockingham Stakes in honour of the host, the Marquess of Rockingham, but the Marquess proposed that it should be named instead after Anthony St Leger. That year the event was moved to its present location, Town Moor, in 1778.

The race came to national prominence in 1800, when a horse called Champion registered the first Derby–St Leger double. Its length was cut to 1 mile, 6 furlongs and 193 yards in 1813, and despite some minor alterations has remained much the same ever since. The victory of West Australian in 1853 completed the first success in the Triple Crown.

=== Post-1900 ===
The St Leger Stakes was closed to geldings in 1906. It was transferred to Newmarket during World War I, and the substitute event was called the September Stakes. It was cancelled in 1939 because of the outbreak of World War II, and the following year's edition was held at Thirsk in November. For the remainder of this period it was staged at Manchester (1941), Newmarket (1942–44) and York (1945).

The race was switched to Ayr in 1989 after the scheduled running at Doncaster was abandoned due to subsidence. The 2006 race took place at York because its regular venue was closed for redevelopment.

On 12 September 2026, Saffie Osborne won the St Leger Stakes; it was the first time a female jockey had won a British Classic race.

The St Leger Stakes has inspired a number of similar events around the world, although many are no longer restricted to three-year-olds. European variations include the Irish St. Leger, the Prix Royal-Oak, the Deutsches St. Leger and the St. Leger Italiano. Other national equivalents include the Kikuka-shō, the New Zealand St. Leger and the VRC St Leger.

== Records ==
Leading jockey (9 wins):

- Bill Scott – Jack Spigot (1821), Memnon (1825), The Colonel (1828), Rowton (1829), Don John (1838), Charles the Twelfth (1839), Launcelot (1840), Satirist (1841), Sir Tatton Sykes (1846)

Leading trainer (16 wins):

- John Scott – Matilda (1827), The Colonel (1828), Rowton (1829), Margrave (1832), Touchstone (1834), Don John (1838), Charles the Twelfth (1839), Launcelot (1840), Satirist (1841), The Baron (1845), Newminster (1851), West Australian (1853), Warlock (1856), Imperieuse (1857), Gamester (1859), The Marquis (1862)

Leading owner (7 wins):

- Archibald Hamilton, 9th Duke of Hamilton – Paragon (1786), Spadille (1787), Young Flora (1788), Tartar (1792), Petronius (1808), Ashton (1809), William (1814)
- Fastest winning time (at Doncaster) – Logician (2019), 3m 00.27s
- Widest winning margin – Never Say Die (1954), 12 lengths
- Longest odds winner – Theodore (1822), 200/1
- Shortest odds winner – Galtee More (1897), 1/10
- Most runners – 30, in 1825
- Fewest runners – 3, in 1917

== Winners ==
Year	Winner	Jockey	Trainer	Owner	Time
1776	Allabaculia	John Singleton	Christopher Scaife	2nd Marq. of Rockingham
1777	Bourbon	John Cade		William Sotheron
1778	Hollandoise	George Herring	Joseph Rose	Sir Thomas Gascoigne
1779	Tommy	George Lowry	Joseph Rose	Thomas Stapleton
1780	Ruler	John Mangle		William Bethell
1781	Serina	Richard Foster	J. Lowther	William Radcliffe
1782	Imperatrix	George Searle	George Searle	Henry Goodricke
1783	Phoenomenon	Anthony Hall	Isaac Cape	Sir John Lister Kaye
1784	Omphale	John Kirton	M. Mason	John Coates
1785	Cowslip	George Searle	George Searle	Richard Hill
1786	Paragon	John Mangle	John Mangle	Lord Archibald Hamilton
1787	Spadille	John Mangle	John Mangle	Lord Archibald Hamilton
1788	Young Flora	John Mangle	John Mangle	Lord Archibald Hamilton
1789	Pewett (Note: The 1789 race was awarded to Pewett after the first-placed Zanga was disqualified for jostling)	William Wilson	Christopher Scaife	4th Earl Fitzwilliam
1790	Ambidexter	George Searle	George Searle	Mr Dealtry
1791	Young Traveller	John Jackson	John Hutchinson	John Hutchinson
1792	Tartar	John Mangle	John Mangle	Lord Archibald Hamilton
1793	Ninety-three	Bill Peirse		John Clifton
1794	Beningbrough	John Jackson	John Hutchinson	John Hutchinson
1795	Hambletonian	Dixon Boyce	John Hutchinson	Sir Charles Turner
1796	Ambrosio	John Jackson	Frank Neale	Joseph Cookson
1797	Lounger	John Shepherd	George Searle	Gilbert Crompton
1798	Symmetry	John Jackson	Sam King	Sir Thomas Gascoigne
1799	Cockfighter	Tom Fields	Tom Fields	Sir Henry Tempest Vane
1800	Champion	Frank Buckle	Tom Perren	Christopher Wilson
1801	Quiz	John Shepherd	George Searle	Gilbert Crompton
1802	Orville	John Singleton Jr.	Christopher Scaife	4th Earl Fitzwilliam
1803	Remembrancer	Ben Smith	J. Smith	10th Earl of Strathmore
1804	Sancho	Frank Buckle	Bartle Atkinson	Harry Mellish
1805	Staveley	John Jackson	Bartle Atkinson	Harry Mellish
1806	Fyldener	Tom Carr		John Clifton
1807	Paulina	Bill Clift	Christopher Scaife	4th Earl Fitzwilliam
1808	Petronius	Ben Smith	William Theakston	9th Duke of Hamilton
1809	Ashton	Ben Smith	William Theakston	9th Duke of Hamilton
1810	Octavian	Bill Clift	Frank Jordan	6th Duke of Leeds	3:30.00
1811	Soothsayer	Ben Smith	Tommy Sykes	Richard Oliver Gascoigne
1812	Otterington	Bob Johnson	W. Hessletine	Ralph Robb	3:31.00
1813	Altisidora	John Jackson	Tommy Sykes	Richard Watt
1814	William	John Shepherd	William Theakston	9th Duke of Hamilton
1815	Filho da Puta	John Jackson	James Croft	Sir William Maxwell
1816	The Duchess	Ben Smith	James Croft	Sir Bellingham Graham
1817	Ebor	Bob Johnson	John Lonsdale	Henry Peirse
1818	Reveller	Bob Johnson	John Lonsdale	Henry Peirse	3:15.00
1819	Antonio	Tom Nicholson	John Lonsdale	James Ferguson	3:18.00
1820	St Patrick	Bob Johnson	John Lonsdale	Sir Edward Smith	3:26.0
1821	Jack Spigot	Bill Scott	Isaac Blades	Thomas Orde-Powlett
1822	Theodore	John Jackson	James Croft	Edward Petre	3:23.0
1823	Barefoot	Tom Goodisson	Richard Shepherd	Richard Watt	3:23.00
1824	Jerry	Ben Smith	James Croft	Richard Oliver Gascoigne	3:29.00
1825	Memnon	Bill Scott	Richard Shepherd	Richard Watt	3:23.00
1826	Tarrare	George Nelson	Sam King	6th Earl of Scarbrough	3:25.00
1827	Matilda	Jem Robinson	John Scott	Edward Petre	3:24.00
1828	The Colonel	Bill Scott	John Scott	Edward Petre
1829	Rowton	Bill Scott	John Scott	Edward Petre
1830	Birmingham	Patrick Conolly	Thomas Flintoff	John Beardsworth
1831	Chorister	John Barham Day	John Smith	1st Marq. of Cleveland
1832	Margrave	Jem Robinson	John Scott	John Gully
1833	Rockingham	Sam Darling	Richard Shepherd	Richard Watt	3:28.00
1834	Touchstone	George Calloway	John Scott	1st Marq. of Westminster	3:22.00
1835	Queen of Trumps	Tommy Lye	John Blenkhorn	Edward Lloyd-Mostyn	3:20.00
1836	Elis	John Barham Day	John Doe	Lord George Bentinck	3:20.00
1837	Mango	Sam Day Jr.	Montgomery Dilly	Charles Greville	3:23.00
1838	Don John	Bill Scott	John Scott	6th Earl of Chesterfield	3:17.00
1839	Charles the Twelfth (Note: The 1839 outcome was a dead-heat, but Charles the Twelfth beat Euclid in a run-off)	Bill Scott	John Scott	Major Yarburgh	3:25.00
1840	Launcelot	Bill Scott	John Scott	1st Marq. of Westminster	3:40.00
1841	Satirist	Bill Scott	John Scott	1st Marq. of Westminster	3:22.00
1842	Blue Bonnet	Tommy Lye	Tom Dawson	13th Earl of Eglinton	3:19.00
1843	Nutwith	Job Marson	Bob Johnson	Samuel Wrather	3:20.00
1844	Faugh-a-Ballagh	Henry Bell	John Forth	Edward John Irwin	3:28.00
1845	The Baron	Frank Butler	John Scott	George Watts	3:25.00
1846	Sir Tatton Sykes	Bill Scott	William Oates	Bill Scott	3:16.00
1847	Van Tromp	Job Marson	John Fobert	13th Earl of Eglinton	3:20.00
1848	Surplice	Nat Flatman	Robert Stephenson Jr.	3rd Viscount Clifden	3:19.00
1849	The Flying Dutchman	Charles Marlow	John Fobert	13th Earl of Eglinton	3:20.00
1850	Voltigeur (Note: The 1850 race finished as a dead-heat, but Voltigeur defeated Russborough in a run-off)	Job Marson	Robert Hill	2nd Earl of Zetland	3:24.00
1851	Newminster	Sim Templeman	John Scott	Anthony Nichol	3:20.00
1852	Stockwell	John Norman	William Harlock	2nd Marquess of Exeter	3:21.00
1853	West Australian	Frank Butler	John Scott	John Bowes	3:20.00
1854	Knight of St George	Robert Basham	R. Longstaff	J. B. Morris	3:32.00
1855	Saucebox	John Wells	Tom Parr	Tom Parr	3:22.00
1856	Warlock	Nat Flatman	John Scott	Anthony Nichol	3:25.00
1857	Imperieuse	Nat Flatman	John Scott	John Scott	3:25.00
1858	Sunbeam	Luke Snowden	John Prince	James Merry	3:20.00
1859	Gamester	Tom Aldcroft	John Scott	Sir Charles Monck	3:25.00
1860	St Albans	Luke Snowden	Alec Taylor Sr.	2nd Marq. of Ailesbury	3:20.00
1861	Caller Ou	Tom Chaloner	William I'Anson	William I'Anson	3:16.20
1862	The Marquis	Tom Chaloner	John Scott	Stanhope Hawke	3:22.00
1863	Lord Clifden	John Osborne Jr.	Edwin Parr	3rd Viscount St Vincent	3:17.50
1864	Blair Athol	Jim Snowden	William I'Anson	William I'Anson	3:19.50
1865	Gladiateur	Harry Grimshaw	Tom Jennings	Frédéric de Lagrange	3:20.00
1866	Lord Lyon	Harry Custance	James Dover	Richard Sutton	3:23.00
1867	Achievement	Tom Chaloner	James Dover	Mark Pearson	3:17.00
1868	Formosa	Tom Chaloner	Henry Woolcott	William Graham	3:19.50
1869	Pero Gomez	John Wells	John Porter	Sir Joseph Hawley	3:21.50
1870	Hawthornden	Jemmy Grimshaw	Joseph Dawson	Thomas Vaughan Morgan	3:18.50
1871	Hannah	Charlie Maidment	Joseph Hayhoe	Mayer de Rothschild	3:22.00
1872	Wenlock	Charlie Maidment	Tom Wadlow	2nd Earl of Wilton	3:21.50
1873	Marie Stuart	Tom Osborne	Robert Peck	James Merry	3:22.00
1874	Apology	John Osborne Jr.	William Osborne	John King	3:16.00
1875	Craig Millar	Tom Chaloner	Alec Taylor Sr.	William Stuart Stirling-Crawfurd	3:20.00
1876	Petrarch	Jem Goater	John Dawson	Viscount Dupplin	3:19.50
1877	Silvio	Fred Archer	Mathew Dawson	6th Viscount Falmouth	3:27.00
1878	Jannette	Fred Archer	Mathew Dawson	6th Viscount Falmouth	3:20.50
1879	Rayon d'Or	Jem Goater	Tom Jennings	Frédéric de Lagrange	3:21.00
1880	Robert the Devil	Tom Cannon Sr.	Charles Blanton	Charles Brewer	3:32.00
1881	Iroquois	Fred Archer	Jacob Pincus	Pierre Lorillard	3:20.60
1882	Dutch Oven	Fred Archer	Mathew Dawson	6th Viscount Falmouth	3:16.00
1883	Ossian	John Watts	Richard Marsh	12th Duke of Hamilton	3:19.00
1884	The Lambkin	John Watts	Mathew Dawson	Robert Vyner	3:14.00
1885	Melton	Fred Archer	Mathew Dawson	20th Baron Hastings	3:15.60
1886	Ormonde	Fred Archer	John Porter	1st Duke of Westminster	3:21.4
1887	Kilwarlin	Jack Robinson	James Jewitt	7th Baron Rodney	3:26.00
1888	Seabreeze	Jack Robinson	James Jewitt	5th Baron Calthorpe	3:11.8
1889	Donovan	Fred Barrett	George Dawson	6th Duke of Portland	3:13.00
1890	Memoir	John Watts	George Dawson	6th Duke of Portland	3:13.60
1891	Common	George Barrett	John Porter	Sir Frederick Johnstone	3:14.40
1892	La Fleche	John Watts	John Porter	Maurice de Hirsch	3:14.60
1893	Isinglass	Tommy Loates	James Jewitt	Harry McCalmont	3:13.40
1894	Throstle	Morny Cannon	John Porter	1st Baron Alington	3:12.20
1895	Sir Visto	Sam Loates	Mathew Dawson	5th Earl of Rosebery	3:18.40
1896	Persimmon	John Watts	Richard Marsh	Prince of Wales	3:20.00
1897	Galtee More	Charles Wood	Sam Darling	John Gubbins	3:31.20
1898	Wildfowler	Charles Wood	Sam Darling	Henry Greer	3:13.00
1899	Flying Fox	Morny Cannon	John Porter	1st Duke of Westminster	3:15.60
1900	Diamond Jubilee	Herbert Jones	Richard Marsh	Prince of Wales	3:09.20
1901	Doricles	Kempton Cannon	Alfred Hayhoe	Leopold de Rothschild	3:08.40
1902	Sceptre	Frank Hardy	Bob Sievier	Bob Sievier	3:12.40
1903	Rock Sand	Danny Maher	George Blackwell	Sir James Miller	3:09.40
1904	Pretty Polly	Willie Lane	Peter Gilpin	Eustace Loder	3:05.80
1905	Challacombe	Otto Madden	Alec Taylor Jr.	Washington Singer	3:05.40
1906	Troutbeck	Georges Stern	Willie Waugh	2nd Duke of Westminster	3:04.20
1907	Wool Winder	Bill Halsey	Harry Enoch	Ned Baird	3:05.60
1908	Your Majesty	Walter Griggs	Charles Morton	Jack Joel	3:06.00
1909	Bayardo	Danny Maher	Alec Taylor Jr.	Alfred Cox	3:08.60
1910	Swynford	Frank Wootton	George Lambton	17th Earl of Derby	3:04.00
1911	Prince Palatine	Frank O'Neill	Henry Beardsley	Thomas Pilkington	3:06.00
1912	Tracery	George Bellhouse	John Watson	August Belmont Jr.	3:11.80
1913	Night Hawk	Elijah Wheatley	Jack Robinson	William Hall Walker	3:03.60
1914	Black Jester	Walter Griggs	Charles Morton	Jack Joel	3:02.60
1915	Pommern	Steve Donoghue	Charles Peck	Solomon Joel	2:55.60
1916	Hurry On	Charlie Childs	Fred Darling	James Buchanan	2:59.60
1917	Gay Crusader	Steve Donoghue	Alec Taylor Jr.	Alfred Cox	2:59.60
1918	Gainsborough	Joe Childs	Alec Taylor Jr.	Lady James Douglas	3:04.00
1919	Keysoe	Brownie Carslake	George Lambton	17th Earl of Derby	3:06.80
1920	Caligula	Arthur Smith	Harvey Leader	Mathradas Goculdas	3:07.40
1921	Polemarch	Joe Childs	Tom Green	7th Marq. of Londonderry	3:06.80
1922	Royal Lancer	Bobby Jones	Alf Sadler Jr.	5th Earl of Lonsdale	3:14.20
1923	Tranquil	Tommy Weston	Charles Morton	17th Earl of Derby	3:05.00
1924	Salmon-Trout	Brownie Carslake	Dick Dawson	Aga Khan III	3:13.20
1925	Solario	Joe Childs	Reginald Day	Sir John Rutherford	3:04.40
1926	Coronach	Joe Childs	Fred Darling	1st Baron Woolavington	3:01.60
1927	Book Law	Henri Jelliss	Alec Taylor Jr.	2nd Viscount Astor	3:14.40
1928	Fairway	Tommy Weston	Frank Butters	17th Earl of Derby	3:03.00
1929	Trigo	Michael Beary	Dick Dawson	William Barnett	3:03.40
1930	Singapore	Gordon Richards	Thomas Hogg	1st Baron Glanely	3:09.20
1931	Sandwich	Harry Wragg	Jack Jarvis	6th Earl of Rosebery	3:11.20
1932	Firdaussi	Freddie Fox	Frank Butters	Aga Khan III	3:04.40
1933	Hyperion	Tommy Weston	George Lambton	17th Earl of Derby	3:06.80
1934	Windsor Lad	Charlie Smirke	Marcus Marsh	Martin H. Benson	3:01.60
1935	Bahram	Charlie Smirke	Frank Butters	Aga Khan III	3:01.80
1936	Boswell	Pat Beasley	Cecil Boyd-Rochfort	William Woodward	3:08.60
1937	Chulmleigh	Gordon Richards	Thomas Hogg	1st Baron Glanely	3:07.40
1938	Scottish Union	Brownie Carslake	Noel Cannon	Jimmy Rank	3:11.40
1939	no race (Note: The 1939 race was cancelled due to the outbreak of World War II)
1940	Turkhan	Gordon Richards	Frank Butters	Aga Khan III	3:32.40
1941	Sun Castle	Georges Bridgland	Cecil Boyd-Rochfort	1st Viscount Portal	3:04.00
1942	Sun Chariot	Gordon Richards	Fred Darling	King George VI	3:08.40
1943	Herringbone	Harry Wragg	Walter Earl	17th Earl of Derby	3:05.00
1944	Tehran	Gordon Richards	Frank Butters	Aga Khan III	3:06.60
1945	Chamossaire	Tommy Lowrey	Dick Perryman	Stanhope Joel	2:55.80
1946	Airborne	Tommy Lowrey	Dick Perryman	John Ferguson	3:10.20
1947	Sayajirao	Edgar Britt	Sam Armstrong	Maharaja of Baroda	3:07.80
1948	Black Tarquin	Edgar Britt	Cecil Boyd-Rochfort	William Woodward	3:08.80
1949	Ridge Wood	Michael Beary	Noel Murless	Geoffrey Smith	3:08.20
1950	Scratch	Rae Johnstone	Charles Semblat	Marcel Boussac	3:08.80
1951	Talma	Rae Johnstone	Charles Semblat	Marcel Boussac	3:13.80
1952	Tulyar	Charlie Smirke	Marcus Marsh	Aga Khan III	3:07.80
1953	Premonition	Eph Smith	Cecil Boyd-Rochfort	Wilfrid Wyatt	3:06.80
1954	Never Say Die	Charlie Smirke	Joseph Lawson	Robert Sterling Clark	3:10.60
1955	Meld	Harry Carr	Cecil Boyd-Rochfort	Lady Zia Wernher	3:14.60
1956	Cambremer	Freddie Palmer	Georges Bridgland	Ralph Strassburger	3:12.20
1957	Ballymoss	T. P. Burns	Vincent O'Brien	John McShain	3:15.60
1958	Alcide	Harry Carr	Cecil Boyd-Rochfort	Sir Humphrey de Trafford	3:06.40
1959	Cantelo	Edward Hide	Charles Elsey	William Hill	3:04.60
1960	St. Paddy	Lester Piggott	Noel Murless	Sir Victor Sassoon	3:13.20
1961	Aurelius	Lester Piggott	Noel Murless	Vera Lilley	3:06.60
1962	Hethersett	Harry Carr	Dick Hern	Lionel Holliday	3:10.80
1963	Ragusa	Garnie Bougoure	Paddy Prendergast	Jim Mullion	3:05.40
1964	Indiana	Jimmy Lindley	Jack Watts	Charles Engelhard	3:05.00
1965	Provoke	Joe Mercer	Dick Hern	Jakie Astor	3:18.60
1966	Sodium	Frankie Durr	George Todd	Radha Sigtia	3:09.80
1967	Ribocco	Lester Piggott	Fulke Johnson Houghton	Charles Engelhard	3:05.40
1968	Ribero	Lester Piggott	Fulke Johnson Houghton	Charles Engelhard	3:19.80
1969	Intermezzo	Ron Hutchinson	Harry Wragg	Gerry Oldham	3:11.80
1970	Nijinsky	Lester Piggott	Vincent O'Brien	Charles Engelhard	3:06.40
1971	Athens Wood	Lester Piggott	Harry Thomson Jones	Eileen Rogerson	3:14.90
1972	Boucher	Lester Piggott	Vincent O'Brien	Ogden Phipps	3:28.71
1973	Peleid	Frankie Durr	Bill Elsey	William Behrens	3:08.21
1974	Bustino	Joe Mercer	Dick Hern	Lady Beaverbrook	3:09.02
1975	Bruni	Tony Murray	Ryan Price	Charles St George	3:05.31
1976	Crow	Yves Saint-Martin	Angel Penna	Daniel Wildenstein	3:13.17
1977	Dunfermline	Willie Carson	Dick Hern	Queen Elizabeth II	3:05.17
1978	Julio Mariner	Edward Hide	Clive Brittain	Marcos Lemos	3:04.94
1979	Son of Love	Alain Lequeux	Robert Collet	Alexis Rolland	3:09.02
1980	Light Cavalry	Joe Mercer	Henry Cecil	Jim Joel	3:11.48
1981	Cut Above	Joe Mercer	Dick Hern	Sir Jakie Astor	3:11.60
1982	Touching Wood	Paul Cook	Harry Thomson Jones	Maktoum Al Maktoum	3:03.53
1983	Sun Princess	Willie Carson	Dick Hern	Sir Michael Sobell	3:16.65
1984	Commanche Run	Lester Piggott	Luca Cumani	Ivan Allan	3:09.93
1985	Oh So Sharp	Steve Cauthen	Henry Cecil	Sheikh Mohammed	3:07.13
1986	Moon Madness	Pat Eddery	John Dunlop	Duchess of Norfolk	3:05.03
1987	Reference Point	Steve Cauthen	Henry Cecil	Louis Freedman	3:05.91
1988	Minster Son	Willie Carson	Neil Graham	Lady Beaverbrook	3:06.80
1989 (Note: The 1989 running took place at Ayr over 1-mile, 6 furlongs and 127 yards)	Michelozzo	Steve Cauthen	Henry Cecil	Charles St George	3:20.72
1990	Snurge	Richard Quinn	Paul Cole	Martyn Arbib	3:08.78
1991	Toulon	Pat Eddery	André Fabre	Khalid Abdullah	3:03.12
1992	User Friendly	George Duffield	Clive Brittain	Bill Gredley	3:05.48
1993	Bob's Return	Philip Robinson	Mark Tompkins	Jackie Smith	3:07.85
1994	Moonax	Pat Eddery	Barry Hills	Sheikh Mohammed	3:04.19
1995	Classic Cliche	Frankie Dettori	Saeed bin Suroor	Godolphin	3:09.74
1996	Shantou	Frankie Dettori	John Gosden	Sheikh Mohammed	3:05.10
1997	Silver Patriarch	Pat Eddery	John Dunlop	Peter Winfield	3:06.92
1998	Nedawi	John Reid	Saeed bin Suroor	Godolphin	3:05.61
1999	Mutafaweq	Richard Hills	Saeed bin Suroor	Godolphin	3:02.75
2000	Millenary	Richard Quinn	John Dunlop	Neil Jones	3:02.58
2001	Milan	Michael Kinane	Aidan O'Brien	Tabor / Magnier	3:05.16
2002	Bollin Eric	Kevin Darley	Tim Easterby	Sir Neil Westbrook	3:02.92
2003	Brian Boru	Jamie Spencer	Aidan O'Brien	Sue Magnier	3:04.64
2004	Rule of Law	Kerrin McEvoy	Saeed bin Suroor	Godolphin	3:06.29
2005	Scorpion	Frankie Dettori	Aidan O'Brien	Magnier / Tabor	3:19.01
2006 (Note: The 2006 edition was contested at York over 1-mile, 5 furlongs and 197 yards)	Sixties Icon	Frankie Dettori	Jeremy Noseda	Susan Roy	2:57.29
2007	Lucarno	Jimmy Fortune	John Gosden	George Strawbridge	3:01.90
2008	Conduit	Frankie Dettori	Sir Michael Stoute	Ballymacoll Stud	3:07.92
2009	Mastery	Ted Durcan	Saeed bin Suroor	Godolphin	3:04.81
2010	Arctic Cosmos	William Buick	John Gosden	Hood / Geffen	3:03.12
2011	Masked Marvel	William Buick	John Gosden	Bjorn Nielsen	3:00.44
2012	Encke	Mickael Barzalona	Mahmood Al Zarooni	Godolphin	3:03.81
2013	Leading Light	Joseph O'Brien	Aidan O'Brien	Smith / Magnier / Tabor	3:09.20
2014	Kingston Hill	Andrea Atzeni	Roger Varian	Paul Smith	3:05.42
2015	Simple Verse (Note: The 2015 race was initially awarded to Bondi Beach after the first-placed Simple Verse was disqualified, but the decision was reversed on 23 September 2015 after an appeal by Simple Verse's connections.)	Andrea Atzeni	Ralph Beckett	QRL / Al Thani / Al Kubaisi	3:07.12
2016	Harbour Law	George Baker	Laura Mongan	Jackie Cornwell	3:05.48
2017	Capri	Ryan Moore	Aidan O'Brien	Smith / Magnier / Tabor	3:04.04
2018	Kew Gardens	Ryan Moore	Aidan O'Brien	Smith / Magnier / Tabor	3:03.34
2019	Logician	Frankie Dettori	John Gosden	Khalid Abdullah	3:00.27
2020	Galileo Chrome	Tom Marquand	Joseph O'Brien	Galileo Chrome Partnership	3:01.94
2021	Hurricane Lane	William Buick	Charlie Appleby	Godolphin	3:04.28
2022	Eldar Eldarov	David Egan	Roger Varian	KHK Racing	3:08.39
2023	Continuous	Ryan Moore	Aidan O'Brien	Tabor / Smith / Magnier et al.	3:06.95
2024	Jan Brueghel	Sean Levey	Aidan O'Brien	Westerberg / Tabor / Smith / Magnier	3:04.52
2025	Scandinavia	Tom Marquand	Aidan O'Brien	Tabor / Smith / Magnier	3:04.63
2026	Highwayman	Saffie Osborne	Joseph O'Brien	John Ioannis Neocleous	3:03.33

Wartime races
- 1915–18: The September Stakes at Newmarket (Rowley Mile) over 1-mile and 6 furlongs.
- 1940: The Yorkshire St Leger Stakes at Thirsk over 1-mile and 7 furlongs.
- 1941: The New St Leger Stakes at Manchester over 1-mile and 6 furlongs.
- 1942–44: The New St Leger Stakes at Newmarket (Summer Course) over 1-mile, 6 furlongs and 150 yards.
- 1945: The St Leger Stakes at York over 1-mile and 6 furlongs.

== In popular culture ==
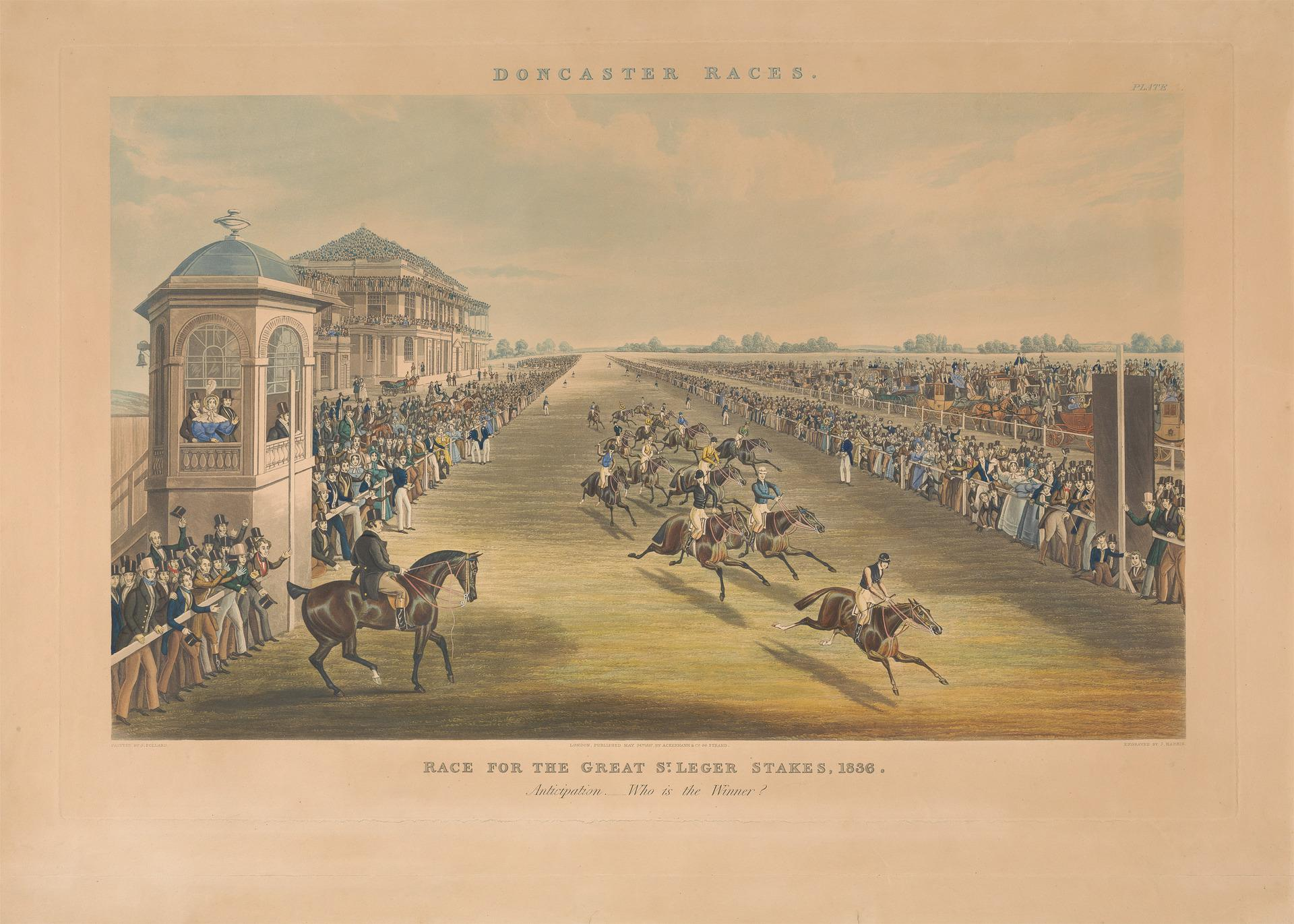
The 1836 St Leger

As the last of the classics, the race marks the end of summer in England. The popular adage "sell in May and go away, come back on St Leger Day" suggests investors should sell their shares in May and buy again after the race.

The Agatha Christie novel The A.B.C. Murders has the St Leger as a plot point near the end of the novel.

== See also ==
- Horse racing in Great Britain
- List of British flat horse races

== Bibliography ==
- Abelson, Edward; Tyrrel, John (1993). The Breedon Book of Horse Racing Records. Breedon Books. pp. 175–181. ISBN 1-873626-15-0.
- Cawthorne, George James; Herod, Richard S. (1902). Royal Ascot, Its History & Its Associations (PDF). London: A Treherne & Co.
- Randall, John; Morris, Tony (1985). Horse Racing: The Records. Guinness Superlatives Ltd. pp. 56–68. ISBN 0-85112-446-1.
- Ruffs Guide to the Turf, Winter Edition, 1920
