= Lady Angela =

British-bred Thoroughbred racehorse

- Sire: Hyperion
- Grandsire: Gainsborough
- Dam: Sister Sarah
- Damsire: Abbott's Trace
- Sex: Mare
- Foaled: 1944
- Died: 1966 (aged 21–22)
- Country: Great Britain
- Colour: Chestnut
- Breeder: Martin H. Benson
- Owner: Martin Benson; E. P. Taylor
- Record: 11: 1-?-?

Awards
- Canadian Horse Racing Hall of Fame (2010); Lady Angela Stakes

Lady Angela (1944–1966) was a British-bred Thoroughbred who became the foundation mare of E. P. Taylor's Windfields Farm in Canada. She was the dam of Nearctic, the Canadian Horse of the Year in 1958 and seven-time leading sire in Canada. Among Nearctic's offspring was the great Northern Dancer, a champion in both Canada and the United States, and subsequently a leading sire in both North America and Europe.

For her worldwide influence on the breed, Lady Angela was inducted into the Canadian Horse Racing Hall of Fame in 2010.

== Background ==
Lady Angela was a chestnut mare bred in Great Britain by Martin H. Benson. Benson was a prominent bookmaker and the owner of Beech House Stud. Just before the start of World War II, Benson purchased the undefeated Nearco from Federico Tesio for a then-record £60,000. Benson thought so highly of Nearco that he installed a bomb shelter in Nearco's paddock and had the horse trained to enter it during air raids. Nearco had a dominant, highly strung temperament that he passed on to many of his descendants.

Lady Angela was sired by Hyperion, who won the 1933 Epsom Derby and then became a leading sire and broodmare sire. Lady Angela was out of Sister Sarah, the dam of four stakes winners – Black Peter, Lady Sybil, Barkersgate, and Welsh Abbot. Sister Sarah also produced several influential broodmares, including Caerlissa, Lady Sybil, Sybil's Sister, and The Veil. These mares have produced numerous stakes winners around the world, including St Paddy, To-Agori-Mou, Sixties Icon, and Workforce, as well as important sire Great Nephew.

== Racing career ==
Lady Angela raced 11 times, earning one win at Epsom. She also placed four times.

== Broodmare career ==
Lady Angela was retired from racing in 1948. Of her first four foals, only one, a stakes-placed filly by Nearco named Mary Martin, was considered a success. Another, also by Nearco, was so temperamental that he was gelded. These two foals were early examples of what later became a famous "nick", referring to Nearco's higher-than-average success rate when bred to mares by Hyperion. In 1952, Lady Angela was mated once more to Nearco and was then offered in foal at the Newmarket December Sales.

At the same time, Canadian businessman E. P. Taylor was looking to upgrade his breeding stock. He instructed George Blackwell of the British Bloodstock Agency to purchase the best mare available at the Newmarket sale, so Blackwell picked out Lady Angela at a sale-topping price of 10,500 guineas. Before shipping her to Canada, Taylor also wanted the mare bred back to Nearco, for which he paid an additional $3,000. The foal that Lady Angela was carrying at the sale (her third by Nearco, foaled in 1953) was later named Empire Day and won three races from 36 starts. The foal that Lady Angela produced after arriving in Canada (her fourth by Nearco, foaled in 1954) was Nearctic.

Nearctic won 21 of his 42 starts despite an extremely high strung temperament that made him difficult to train. He also had a persistent quarter crack that curtailed his three-year-old campaign. Treated patiently by Horatio Luro, he recovered at age four to win major stakes races in both Canada and the United States, and was named the 1958 Canadian Horse of the Year. Upon retirement, he then became the leading sire in Canada seven times. One of his offspring was Northern Dancer, who became the first Canadian-bred to win the Kentucky Derby and then became the most dominant sire worldwide of the late 20th century. Genetic analysis of Thoroughbreds suggests that the reason for Nearctic's success is that he carried a then-rare allele of a gene called MSTN, associated with muscle growth. The more common "T" allele of MSTN is associated with stamina while the rarer "C" allele that Nearctic carried is associated with speed and earlier development.

After Nearctic, Lady Angela produced eight more foals, seven of which were winners. The most successful on the racetrack was Choperion, by Chop Chop, who won the Coronation Futurity. Several of her daughters became successful producers, including:

- Countess Angela – dam of Queen's Plate winner Titled Hero
- Lady Victoria – dam of Northern Taste, winner of the Prix de la Forêt and 10-time leading sire in Japan. Northern Taste was inbred to Lady Angela as he was sired by Northern Dancer

Lady Angela died in 1966 and was buried in the Trillium Cemetery at Windfields Farm near Oshawa. The farm was later sold, with the graveyard closed off to public access. In 2014, a request was made to the city of Oshawa to designate portions of the core buildings and cemetery under the Ontario Heritage Act. The proposal summarized Lady Angela's historical importance: "Even if she were the only horse buried in this cemetery, her importance in the way Thoroughbred bloodlines developed due to her influence is enough to preserve and protect it forever."

Lady Angela was inducted into the Canadian Horse Racing Hall of Fame in 2010, joining Nearctic, Northern Dancer and numerous descendants. The Lady Angela Stakes at Woodbine Racetrack is named in her honour.

== Pedigree ==
Pedigree of Lady Angela, chestnut mare, 1944
Sire Hyperion 1930	Gainsborough; 1915	Bayardo	Bay Ronald
Sire Hyperion 1930	Gainsborough; 1915	Bayardo	Galicia
Sire Hyperion 1930	Gainsborough; 1915	Rosedrop	St. Frusquin
Sire Hyperion 1930	Gainsborough; 1915	Rosedrop	Rosaline
Sire Hyperion 1930	Selene; 1919	Chaucer	St. Simon
Sire Hyperion 1930	Selene; 1919	Chaucer	Canterbury Pilgrim
Sire Hyperion 1930	Selene; 1919	Serenissima	Minoru
Sire Hyperion 1930	Selene; 1919	Serenissima	Gondolette
Dam Sister Sarah 1930	Abbott's Trace; 1917	Tracery	Rock Sand
Dam Sister Sarah 1930	Abbott's Trace; 1917	Tracery	Topiary
Dam Sister Sarah 1930	Abbott's Trace; 1917	Abbott's Anne	Right-Away
Dam Sister Sarah 1930	Abbott's Trace; 1917	Abbott's Anne	Sister Lumley
Dam Sister Sarah 1930	Sarita; 1924	Swynford	John o' Gaunt
Dam Sister Sarah 1930	Sarita; 1924	Swynford	Canterbury Pilgrim
Dam Sister Sarah 1930	Sarita; 1924	Molly Desmond	Desmond
Dam Sister Sarah 1930	Sarita; 1924	Molly Desmond	Pretty Polly (family: 14-c)

Lady Angela is inbred 4S × 4D to Canterbury Pilgrim, the winner of the 1896 Epsom Oaks, meaning Canterbury Pilgrim appears in the fourth generation of both the sire's and dam's sides of her pedigree. Lady Angela is also inbred 4S × 5S × 5D to St. Simon.
