= Ella Atherton =

Scottish-born actress (1905–1995)

- Born: 11 September 1905; Edinburgh, Scotland
- Died: May 1995 (aged 89); North Surrey, England
- Other names: H.H. Maharani Ella Devi Sahiba, Ella Devi Rajpipla, Ella Anderson
- Spouse: Sir Vijayasinhji Chhatrasinhji (m. 1940)
- Children: 2
- Relatives: Effie Atherton (sister)

Ella Atherton (11 September 1905 – May 1995) was a Scottish-born actress, fashion model, horse breeder, and Socialite, who married an Indian maharaja, Vijayasinhji Chhatrasinhji in 1940. After marriage, she was also known as Ila Devi Rajpipla; Maharani Ella Devi of Rajpipla or H.H. Maharani Ella Devi Sahiba.

== Early life ==
Atherton was born in Edinburgh under the name of Ella Anderson.

Atherton was her chosen stage name and immigration records to the United States and the Far East indicate that her younger sister Effie, who was born as Euphemia Walker Anderson in Edinburgh on 3 July 1907, also took on the Atherton name, becoming Effie Atherton.

== Career ==
Atherton was a silent movie actress, known for her role in The First Born (1928) as Nina de Lande, with Madeleine Carroll, Miles Mander and John Loder; directed by Miles Mander for Gainsborough Pictures. The success of this silent film, resulted her being the leading actress in Human Cargo (1929) as Sylvia Frescar, alongside David Dunbar. She was also a successful British fashion model. Atherton soon abandoned her acting career, becoming a socialite, catching the attention of an Indian prince, and accompanying him to public events.

By 1938, as a horse breeder, she was referring to herself as Ella A, of Rajpipla. One of her horses, her namesake competed at the Newbury Races.

This extended courtship with a ruler of a princely state involved pursuing other interests, outside of her former acting and modelling profession. As an unofficial consort, she hosted visiting dignitaries and accompanied the maharaja to events overseas, such as the 1939 New York World's Fair. There were also annual visits to the British Raj, which extended over 5–6 months. Some respite from her obligations as a host included tiger hunting, in what is now the Satpura Tiger Reserve.

During World War II she was active in raising funds, and made regular personal donations to the British War Relief Society.

As a widow, for over two decades, she continued her husband’s legacy as a quality breeder of racing horses, in her own name, as Ella Devi of Rajpipla.

== Personal ==
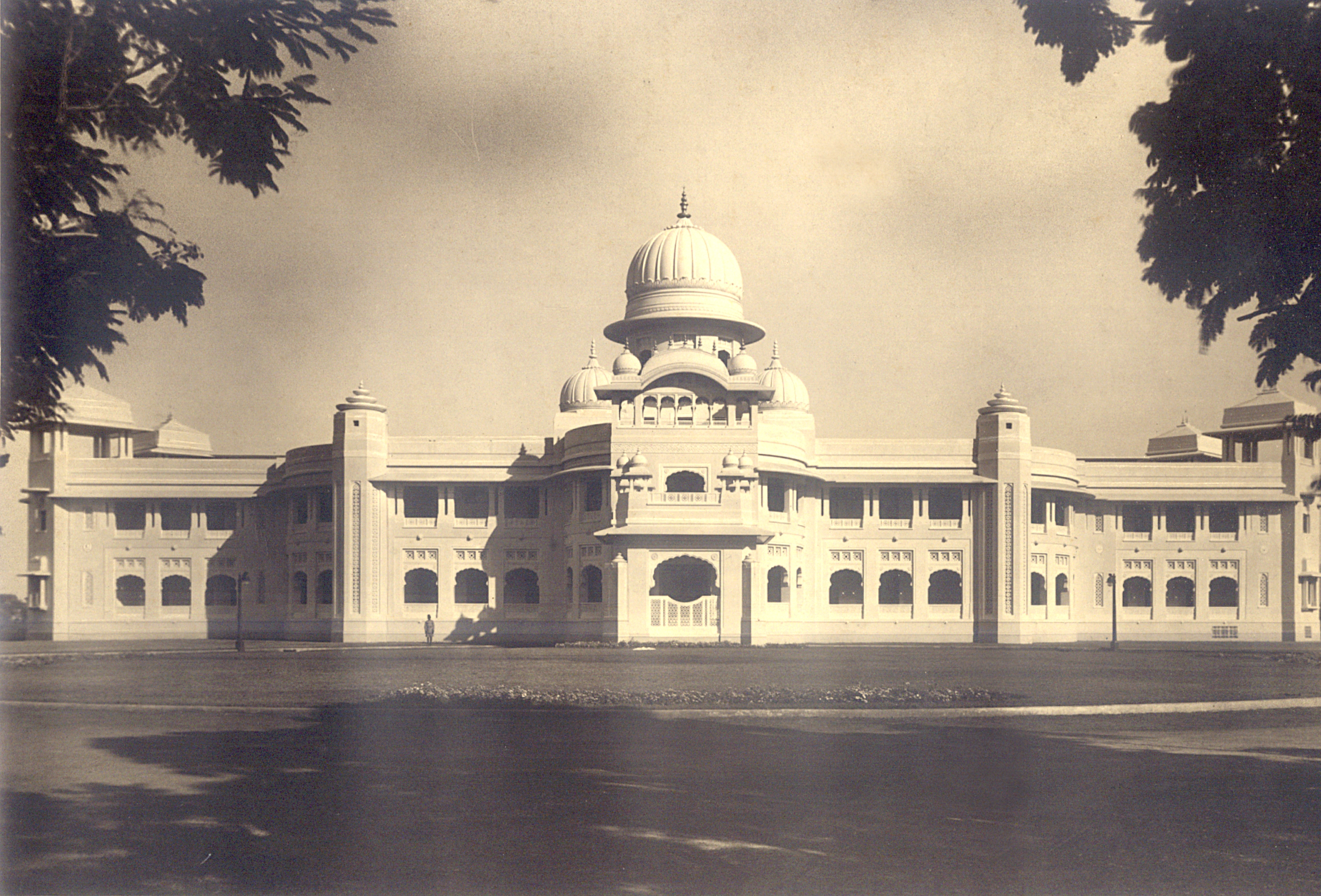
Indrajit-Padmini Mahal, one of Ella Devi Rajpipla's homes in India.

Atherton became a long term companion of Maharana Vijayasinhji Chhatrasinhji Maharaja of Rajpipla prior to 1933, and resided at the Indrajit-Padmini Mahal, or Vadia Palace between 1934 and 1939, spending summers with in England. The Epsom Derby was a key event in her social diary.

Atherton married the Maharaja at a ceremony at the Devchhatra (Devastra) Hill and ancient fort in Rajpipla, on 5 January 1940. This area is now incorporated within the Shoolpaneshwar Wildlife Sanctuary. She was his third wife and took the Hindu name of Maharini Ella Devi Sahiba; however was also referred to as Ella Devi Rajpipla or Maharani Ella Devi.

Atherton was considered at the time of their marriage to be one of the most beautiful women in the British Isles. Her husband, when they met in the early 1930s had long been an accomplished polo player; owner of the Rajpipla Polo Team, a wealthy and influential Anglophile, and the only maharaja to meet President Warren G. Harding during his term in office. He had invested heavily in various infrastructure projects in India and received a knighthood from King George V in the 1925 New Year Honours; Knight Commander of the Order of the Star of India (KCSI). His support for the war effort was commended. This was followed by a GBE (Knight Grand Cross) on 1 January 1945. On an international level, he was a socialite, a successful race horse owner, and winner of the first Indian Derby then known as the Country Bred Derby with Tipster, the Irish Derby in 1926 with Embargo; and the Epsom Derby with Windsor Lad in 1934. Atherton referred to him as ‘Pip’, a name coined by Martin H. Benson. In 1940 her son “Pippy”, Prince Rajsingh was born. A term of endearment was inherited. When not entertaining high society friends, such as the Aga Khan III and British aristocracy at their home in Old Windsor, Berkshire; a 27-roomed Victorian mansion located on Church Road, they were both active within the UK social season from April to August each year.

In the advent of Indian Independence, her husband ceased to be the ruler of the ancient Princely state of Rajpipla until Indian statehood in 1948. Although they visited India frequently, and titles were retained, the UK became their primary residence.

Prior to Indian Independence, it had been necessary for Atherton to prove her marital status to the British authorities. These records dating from 1945 to 1946 are held by the UK National Archives.

After Indian independence, Maharani Ella Devi, continued to mix within European high society circles, attending events with her husband, including the Epsom races. She was a regular at the summer circuit of charity events and gala evenings in the South of France; seen here attending a gala evening at a casino in Deauville, France. They also travelled to the United States.

Her daughter, Princess Premila of Rajpipla was born in 1949, and was educated at Heathfield School, Ascot, and later became a fashion model, a businesswoman and a socialite.

Her husband died suddenly on 29 April 1951, at their home in Old Windsor. Her son went on to be educated at Westminster School and pursued a career in journalism. He was introduced to the turf by his father at a very young age, and subsequently inherited a passion for horse racing.

As a widow, she still had the choice of being called Her Highness or Lady Rajpipla. In later years, she continued to entertain, eventually retreating from society, dying at the age of 89, in Surrey during May 1995.
