= Vijayasinhji Chhatrasinhji =

Indian maharaja, horse breeder and businessman

Vijayasinhji
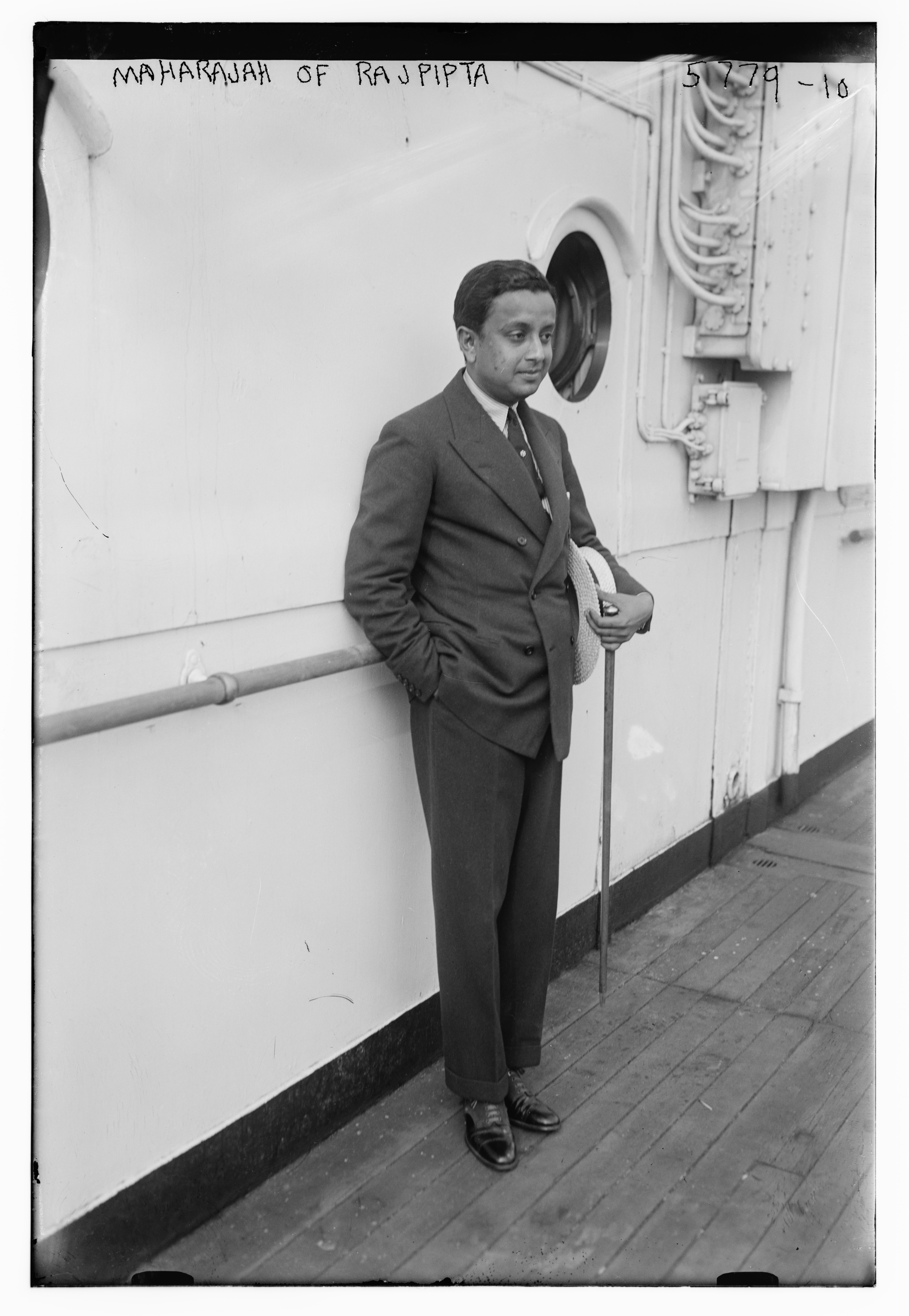
- during his US tour of 1922. Bain News Service.

King of Rajpipla
- Reign: 1915 - 1948
- Predecessor: Chhatrasinhji
- Born: 30 January 1890; Chhatra Vilas Palace, Nandod, State of Rajpipla
- Died: 29 April 1951 (aged 61); The Manor, Old Windsor, Berkshire, England
- Spouse: Princess Uday Kunverba of Amleta (m. 1911 - 1951; his death); Princess Padmini Kunverba of Panna (m. 1917 - 1951; his death); Ella Atherton (m. 1940 - 1951; his death)
- Issue: See: With Uday Kunverba: Crown Prince Rajendrasinhji Prince Raghunathsinhji Princess Kunverba Kusum, Crown Princess of Chhota-Udaipur Prince Pramodsinhji With Padmini Kunverba: Mohini, Crown Princess of Morvi Prince Vijaysinhji Prince Indrajeetsinhji Princess Chandra Prabha Kumari With Ella Devi: Prince Rajsingh Princess Premila Devi
- House: Gohil-Rajpipla
- Father: Chhatrasinhji I of Rajpipla
- Mother: Princess Phool Kunverba of Wankaner
- Religion: Hindusim

Vijaysinhji Chhatrasinhji (30 January 1890 - 29 April 1951) was the last Maharaja of the Rajpipla State, who ruled from 1915 to 1948. He was also a successful race horse owner, a socialite and an accomplished horseman and a polo player. He played a key role in the negotiations leading to the integration of several Princely state’s into the Indian Union. Some articles refer to him as Vijayasinhji instead of Vijaysinhji.

== Biography ==
Born into an elite Gohil dynasty, he was the son of the ruler of Rajpipla State, Chhatrasinhji Gambhirsinhji (1862-1915), via his first wife, Princess Wankanerwala Maharani Shri Phool Kunverba Sahiba. He was born in Chhatra Vilas Palace, Nandod. His father governed the 4,000 square kilometres (1,500 mi^{2}) kingdom from 1897 to 1915. As Crown prince, he was educated at Rajkumar College, Rajkot, and subsequently became a member of the Imperial Cadet Corps in Dehradun.

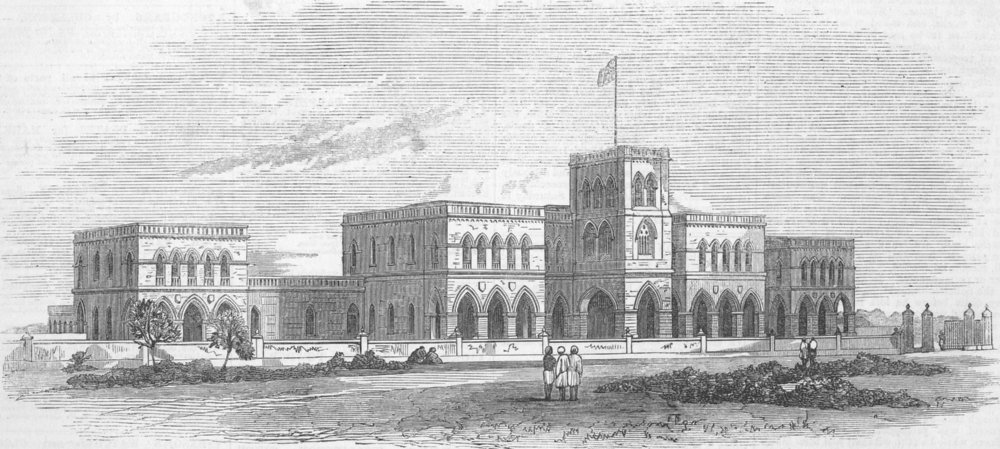
Rajkumar College, Rajkot, Kathiawar. 1871. Illustrated London News

An equestrian enthusiast from a very young age, he was a rider who won his first horse race at the age of eight. Years later he would become the owner of one of the most notable horse stables in both India and England .

As his father's designated heir, he was expected to continue driving modernization within Rajpipla and maintain cordial relations with the Rewa Kantha Agency, and retain the kingdoms First-Class status within the Rewakantha Princely states of Gujarat. In 1911 he was a key participant of the Delhi Durbar, a lavish celebration to commemorate the reign of George V, Emperor of India.

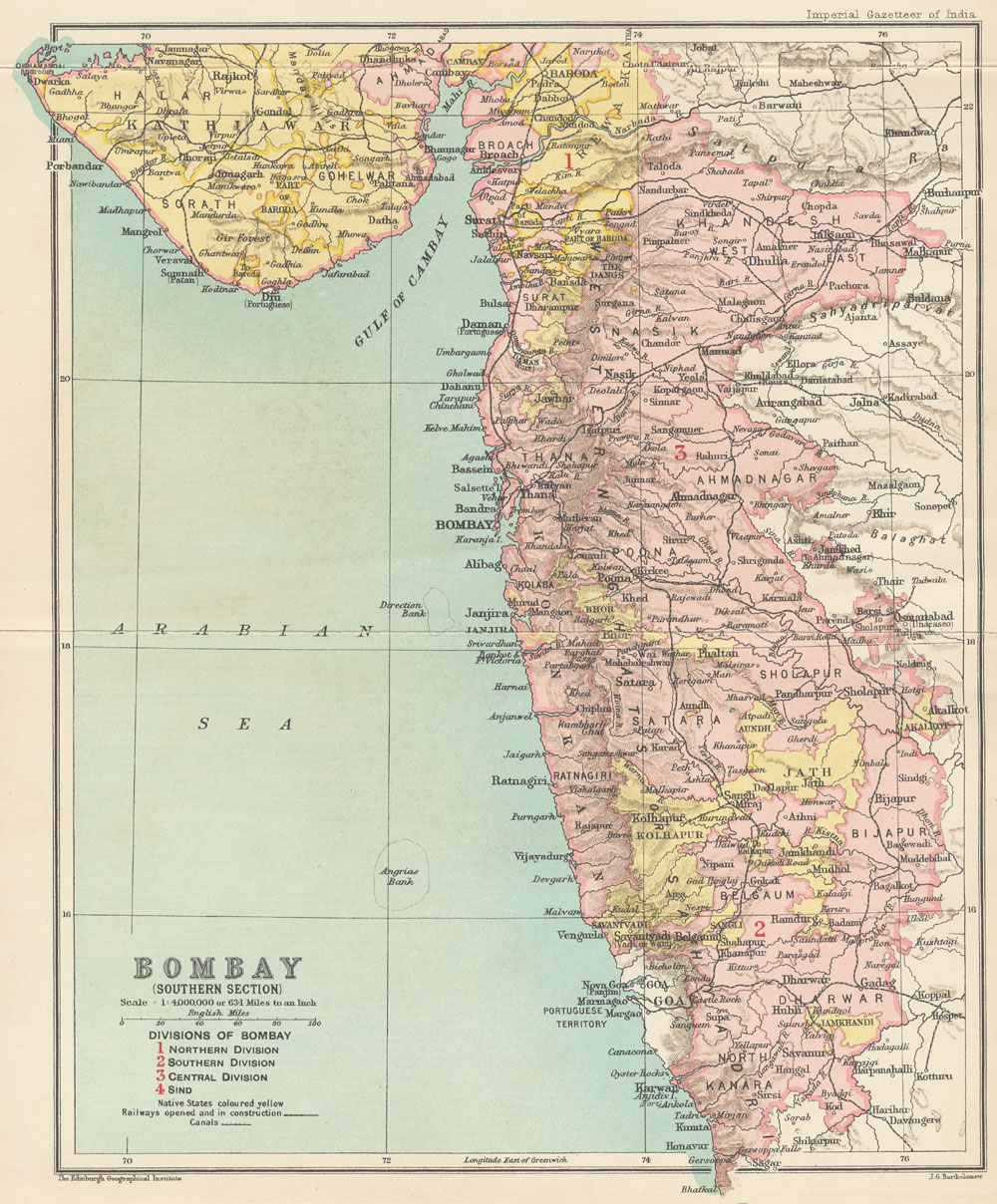
Bombay Presidency map (1908): Rajpipla State in yellow in the upper section in vicinity of the Narmada River

During the World War I, the State of Rajpipla supported the dispatch of numerous recruits to the British Raj in preparation for war service. In recognition of this services to the British Raj during the war period, he was awarded the honorary rank of captain in the British Army. This was reported in The London Gazette in October 1919.

He became the 36th and last ruler of Rajpipla with full ruling powers on 10 December 1915 following the death of his father three months prior, and his elaborate investiture in Old Rajpipla. His Princely state was nominally sovereign, in that it was not directly governed by the British, but rather by him as a ruler under a form of indirect rule, subject to a subsidiary alliance and the suzerainty or paramountcy of the British crown.

Throughout the next decade he enacted a series of administrative reforms, modernising his state, and invested heavily in various public health and infrastructure projects in India, such as a power plant, an aqueduct for drinking water and for irrigation throughout his territories, as well as the first roads and rail links. Under his rule, free primary and affordable secondary education were introduced, as well as a civil and criminal court and a pension system for public administrators.

Records of his trip to France in 1920 were kept by the India Office Records under "Proceedings and Consultations", detailing his political associations. These papers are now held by the UK National Archives.

He achieved success on the racecourse, winning the first Indian Derby, then known as the Country Bred Derby with Tipster in 1919.

He was anointed the hereditary title of Maharaja, entitling him to a permanent salute of 13-guns from 1 January 1921 onwards. Rajpipla was now a Salute state.

In 1922 he embarked on a 15-day tour of the United States to study their financial system. He was accompanied by his uncle, prime minister and head of the army. He was notable for being the only Indian maharaja to meet President Warren G. Harding in Washington D.C.

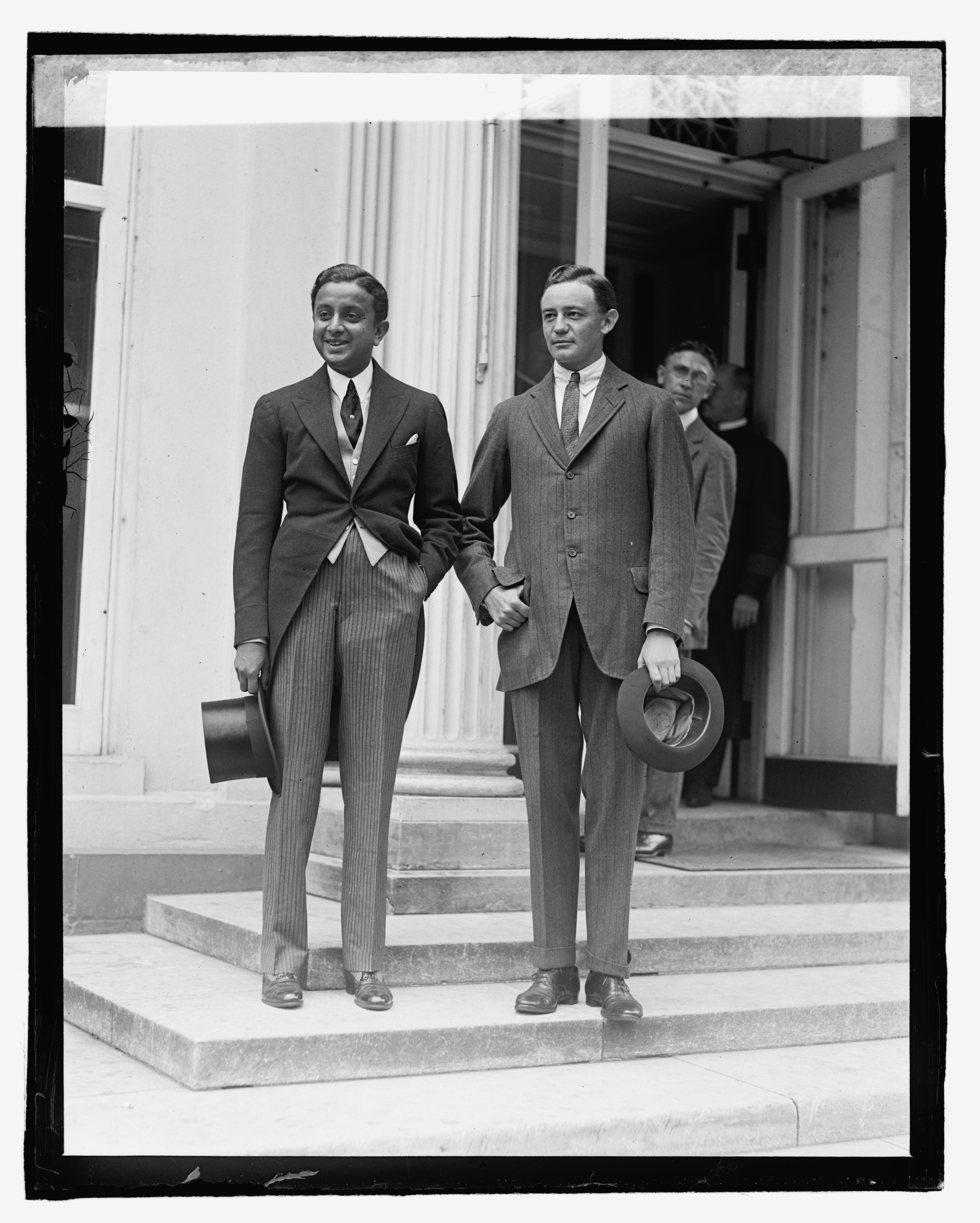
Maharajah Vijaysinhji Chhatrasinhji during his visit to Washington D.C.

By 1922 he was a highly popular socialite on an international level, as well as a racehorse owner. He spent his summers in England and then returned to India for the winter. He established the Rajpipla State polo field and a gymkhana field. He was the owner, sponsor and Captain of the Rajpipla Polo Team. These facilities formed part of the Rajpipla Club, inaugurated by the Viceroy and Governor-General of India, Lord Willingdon. He continued to invest heavily into the infrastructure and development of Rajpipla.

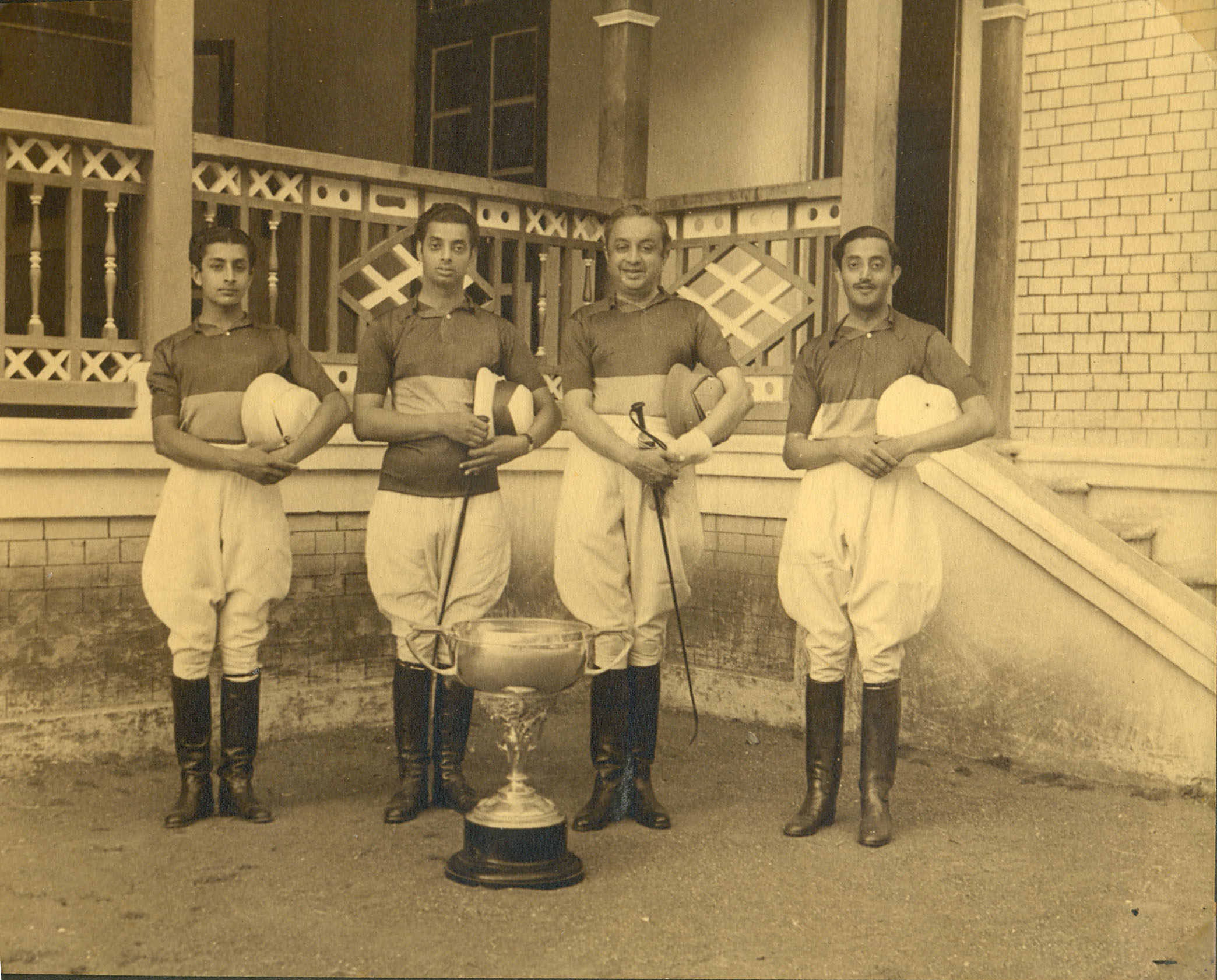
Rajpipla Polo Team 1943 (from left). His son Maharajkumar Indrajeet Singhji. His son, Yuvraj Rajendra Singhji, Maharaja Sir Vijaysinhji and his son, Maharajkumar Pramod Singhji

When not entertaining high society friends, such as the Aga Khan III and British aristocracy at his home in Old Windsor, Berkshire; a 27-roomed Victorian mansion purchased in 1922 and located on Church Road, he was active within the UK social season from April to August each year. As a wealthy and influential Indian Anglophile, he had access to many of the British aristocracy, as well as the political elite. These records dating from 6 April 1922 to 9 October 1930 are held by the UK National Archives.

He received a knighthood from King George V in the 1925 New Year Honours; Knight Commander of the Order of the Star of India (KCSI), and thus became a member of the prestigious Order of the Star of India.

His horse Embargo, won the Irish Derby in 1926; the Grand Prix de Bruxelles in 1927 and the City and Suburban Handicap in Epsom, England. Other horses, such as Melesigenes, gained him further recognition in races on his home turf in Mumbai, Pune and other races on the Indian Subcontinent.

The London Gazette reported on 26 August 1932 his honorary rank as major in the British Army.

His most notable horse, trained by Marcus Marsh was Windsor Lad; with Charlie Smirke as jockey, were the 1934 winners of the Epsom Derby, in England. King George V and Queen Mary, who watched the race along with other members of the Royal Family, invited him to the Royal Box and congratulated him on his victory. Windsor Lad's, winning time of 2:34.0 equalled the race record set by Hyperion the previous year. He celebrated with a lavish party at the Savoy Hotel which featured a performing Indian elephant arrayed in his purple and cream racing colours.

The British socialites referred to him as "Pip", a name coined by his business associate, Martin H. Benson who acquired Windsor Lad during July 1934. To the racecourse crowds he was affectionately known as "Mr. Pip".

In 1935, his heir-apparent attended the Royal Military Academy in Woolwich. The mid-1930s were a time when the British Authorities were increasingly required to keep meticulous records on persons of interest. Of note, was the politically damaging affairs of his first cousin, Kumar Shri Himatsimhji over a 4-year period. There was also his own visit to Continental Europe during 1939 that generated a high level of political interest.

His domestic politics were increasingly fragile. The Praja Mandal, a part of the Indian independence movement had been growing stronger in his state since the 1920s. Their focus was to initially improve civil rights on the Indian subcontinent in areas subject to the rule of feudatory rulers, and sometimes also the British administration. This led to the Round Table Conferences. He had proven himself to be a respected ruler, having gone far beyond the Montagu–Chelmsford Reforms. After the 1930s, the movement took on a strong socialist orientation. Even though he was politically and culturally allied to The Crown throughout his direct rule, he sensed the march of democracy, and endorsed some aspects of the nationalist movement in his own State in the 1940s. His days as a hereditary ruler were numbered following the Government of India Act 1935, since the nationalist movement had sought for future decolonization and Indian self-rule leading to the Instrument of Accession. As a feudatory ruler, he recognised the need to achieve a smooth and safe transition for his 200,000 subjects. He was also, as a ruler of a First-class state within the Western India States Agency highly influential, when communicating future sovereignty proposals within the region.

During World War II, he donated three Supermarine Spitfire’s to the Royal Air Force, the Rajpipla, the Windsor Lad and the Embargo, as well as a Hawker Hurricane called Rajpipla II to the United Kingdom's war effort for use against the Axis powers. His support for the war effort was commended by the British Establishment. He was awarded the Grand Cross of the Order of the British Empire in the 1945 New Year Honours, and now held the honorary rank of lieutenant colonel in the British Army.

During the prelude to the Indian Independence Act 1947, his health was declining, with unscheduled health visits to England from 1945. Records of British Officials concerns were kept by the India Office. These are now held by the UK National Archives.

He continued to support the democratisation of the Indian state and in 1948 provided 2,800,000 rupees to the new Indian government. He urged other Princely states to follow suit in the cause of a united nation at a meeting held at his Nepeansea Road residence in Mumbai. He signed the instrument of accession on 19 March 1948 and his kingdom joined the Union of India on 10 June 1948, putting an end to the 600-year history of the independent state of Rajpipla. As a direct consequence, he ceased to be a ruler of an ancient Princely state.

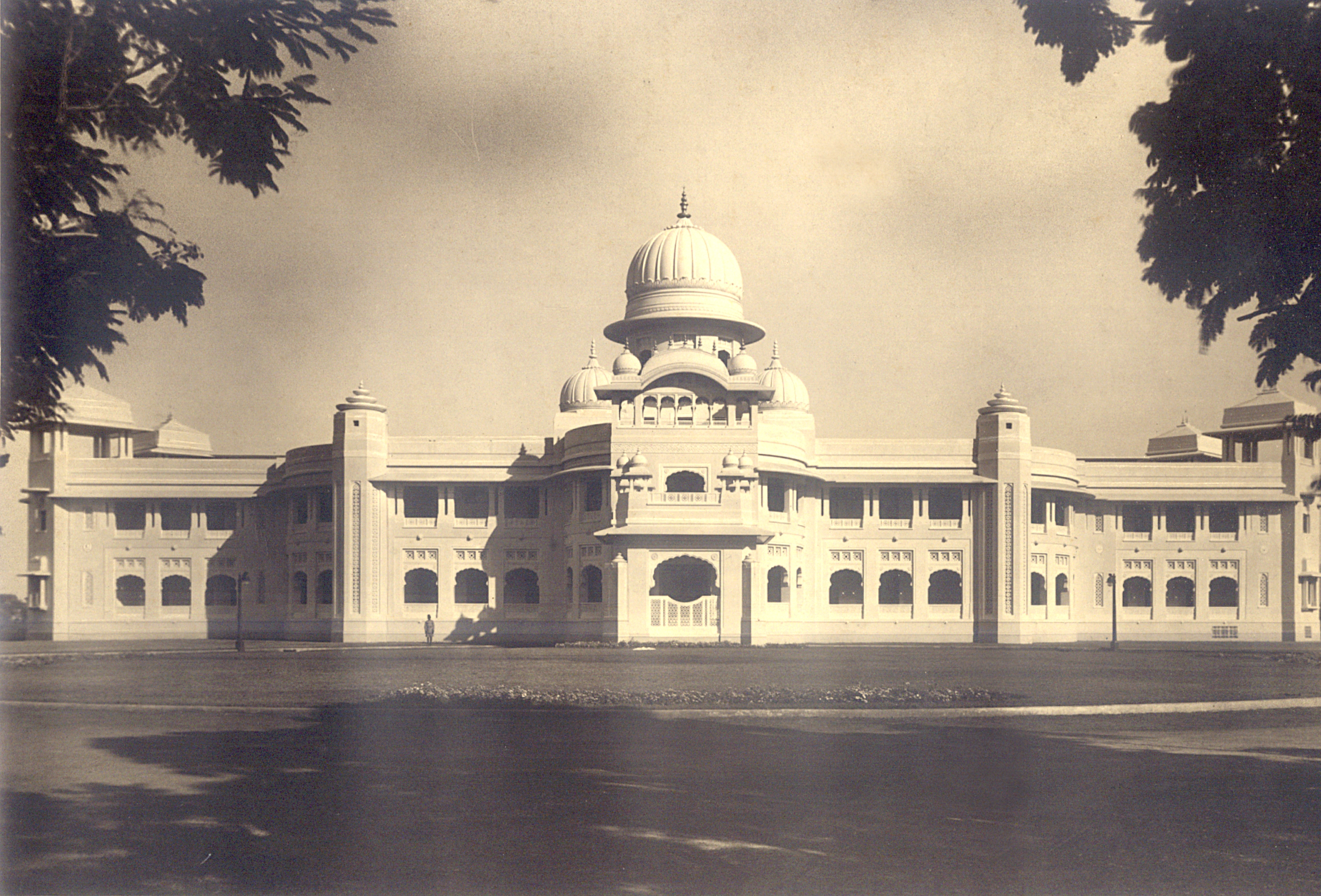
Indrajit-Padmini Mahal, one of his homes in India.

His honorary noble titles were retained and he set about making his home in Old Windsor, set in 3,000 acres (1,200 ha), his primary residence, where he died on 29 April 1951. In accordance with Hindu tradition of his faith, his body was returned to his homeland and was subsequently cremated in Rampura, on the banks of the Narmada River. Despite Indian independence, his vestiges as a Maharaja and honorary knighthood entitled him to a 13 gun salute.

== Personal life ==
He was a keen sportsman, with an avid interest in Cricket. He followed his father's footsteps with his passion for Motor vehicles. He had a stable of luxury vehicles consisting of twelve Rolls-Royces; from the 1913 Silver Ghost to the 1937 Phantom III.

He was able to marry multiple times in accordance with his cultural heritage. His final wife was the Scottish actress, socialite and model, Ella Atherton, who when they were introduced, was considered to be one of the most beautiful women in the British Isles. His new companion retired from her profession, and by 1933 frequently accompanied him to society events.

A charismatic and likable personality widely known in a Royal circles in England, and a desired guest, London aristocrats craved tales from far away lands and he met their expectations. His entourage on occasions included an elephant. Buckingham Palace afforded him much respect. His win at Epsom in 1934 served to enhance his status, and he was invited to the Coronation of George VI and Elizabeth in 1937.

By 1938, his new companion was now a successful horse breeder. Although they had yet to marry, she was already Ella A, of Rajpipla. She clearly welcomed his sponsorship and it cemented their relationship. As his unofficial consort hosting visiting dignitaries, she accompanied him on events overseas, such as the 1939 New York World's Fair.

During the 1930s his time spent in England increased. However, as a popular ruler, his annual visits to Rajpipla, extended over 5–6 months annually. A cherished pastime was to impress his visiting dignitaries with tales of his tiger hunting, in what is now the Satpura Tiger Reserve.

He eventually married Atherton, his long time companion at a ceremony on Devchhatra (Devastra) Hill an ancient fort in Rajpipla, on 5 January 1940. This location was significant to him, since it was where his ancient Gohil Rajput dynasty began its 600-year in 1340. This area is now incorporated within the Shoolpaneshwar Wildlife Sanctuary. Atherton took the Hindu name of Maharini Ella Devi Sahiba. Eight months later, his son “Pippy”, Prince Rajsingh was born in 1940. A term of endearment had been inherited.

Prior to Indian independence, it was necessary for him to prove his marital status to the British authorities. These records dating from 1945 to 1946 are held by the UK National Archives.

After ceasing to be a ruler of a Princely state, he retained his titles at an honorary level from 1948, until his untimely death just three years later after a number of years of declining health. His personal wealth allowed him to continue to engage within European high society circles, attending racing days at Ascot and Epsom, and seasonal social events, including the summer circuit of charity events and gala evenings in the South of France; his last wife was photographed by paparazzi attending a gala evening at a casino in Deauville, France. He also travelled to the United States.

His daughter, Princess Premila of Rajpipla was born in 1949, and was subsequently educated at Heathfield School, Ascot. In her mothers footsteps she became a British fashion model, a businesswoman and a socialite.

== Legacy ==
After his death in 1951, his widow, Ella Devi of Rajpipla continued his legacy as a quality breeder of racing horses.

A bronze statue on horseback in his honour has adorned the main square of Rajpipla since 1952. It was crafted by G. K. Mhatre (1879-1947), a pioneering sculptor of Pre-Independence India who attended Sir Jamsetjee Jeejebhoy School of Art. Known as the Kala Ghoda (Black Horse) circle, it remains a prominent landmark of the city. The square was restored with new railings in 2017, giving the statue greater prominence.

A silver statue about two feet long was crafted by Mappin & Webb, of London.

His son, Prince Rajsingh "Pippy", educated at Westminster School, pursued a career in journalism. Having been introduced to the turf by his father at a very young age, he inherited a passion for horse racing.

His 1934 Rolls-Royce Phantom II has survived and forms part of the Arvind Singh Mewar’s royal cars collection at Udaipur, and was featured in Octopussy, a 1983 British spy film and the thirteenth in the James Bond series. His prized vehicle has also featured in The Jewel in the Crown, a 1984 British television serial about the final days of the British Raj during and after World War II, in the fourth episode, titled "Incidents at a Wedding".

His former residence in Mumbai, Palm Beach on Old Nepeansea Road is now a Consulate General of a foreign nation.

Success at Epsom and his pivotal moments as a horse breeder were published by his grandson Indra Vikram Singh in 2011.

== Newsreel ==
- British Pathe Newsreel "The 1934 Derby". Newsreel with the owner, The Maharaja of Rajpipla guiding Windsor Lad at Epsom(1934)
- British Pathe Newsreel "Windsor Lad’s" owner, The Maharaja of Rajpipla at Northolt Pony Racing (1934)

== See also ==
- List of princely states of British India (alphabetical)
- List of honorary knighthoods in India
- Rajpipla State (1340-1948)
- Rewa Kantha Agency (1811-1937)
- Western India States Agency (1924-1944)
- Baroda and Gujarat States Agency (1933–1944)
- Baroda, Western India and Gujarat States Agency (1944-1947)
- Political integration of India
- Narmada district
