= Wokingham Stakes =

Horse race in Great Britain

- Class: Handicap
- Location: Ascot Racecourse; Ascot, England
- Inaugurated: 1813
- Race type: Flat / Thoroughbred
- Website: Ascot

Race information
- Distance: 6f (1,207 metres)
- Surface: Turf
- Track: Straight
- Qualification: Three-years-old and up
- Weight: Handicap
- Purse: £175,000 (2018); 1st: £108,938

Wokingham Stakes
2026
Double Rush	Completely Random	Soldier's Tree

Previous years
2025
Get It	More Thunder	Ten Pounds
2024
Unequal Love	Dark Trooper	Orazio
2023
Saint Lawrence	Apollo One	Juan Les Pins
2022
Rohaan	Popmaster	Jumby
2021
Rohaan	Fresh	King's Lynn

2020-2011
2020
Hey Jonesy	Summerghand	Spanish City
2019
Cape Byron	Tis Marvellous	Danzeno
2018
Bacchus	Dreamfield	Major Jumbo
2017
Out Do	Steady Pace	Projection
2016
Outback Traveller	Brando	Glen Moss
2015
Interception	Robert Le Diable	Lancelot Du Lac
2014
Baccarat	Professor	Rivellino
2013
York Glory	Shropshire	Dinkum Diamond
2012
Dandy Boy	Waffle	Hawkeyethenoo
2011
Deacon Blues	Waffle	Pastoral Player

2010-2001
2010
Laddies Poker Two	Striking Spirit	Palace Moon
2009
High Standing	Asset	Rock Of Rochelle
2008
Big Timer	Beaver Patrol	King's Apostle
2007
Dark Missile	Intrepid Jack	Balthazaar's Gift
2006
Baltic King	Firenze	Bahamian Pirate
2005
Iffraaj	Beckermet	Peter Paul Rubens
2004
Lafi	Coconut Penang	High Reach
2003
Fayr Jag	Ratio	The Tatling
2002
Capricho	Border Subject	Chookie Heiton
2001
Nice One Clare	Ellens Academy	Seven No Trumps

2000-1991
2000
Harmonic Way	Tussle	Strahan
1999
Deep Space	Halmahera	Young Josh
1998
Selhurstpark Flyer	Dancethenightaway	Superior Premium
1997
Selhurstpark Flyer	Danetime	Bollin Joanne
1996
Emerging Market	Prince Babar	Double Bounce
1995
Astrac	Alzianah	Brave Edge
1994
Venture Capitalist	Law Commission	No Extras
1993
Nagida	Cumbrian Waltzer	Arabellajill
1992
Red Rosein	Double Blue	Kayvee
1991
Amigo Menor	Local Lass	Cantoris

1990-1984
1990
Knight Of Mercy	Amigo Menor	Hana Marie
1989
Mac's Fighter	A Prayer For Wings	Bertie Wooster
1988
Powder Blue	Norgabie	Slip And Stick
1987
Bel Byou	Dorking Lad	Miss Primula
1986
Touch Of Grey	Manimstar	Perfect Timing
1985
Time Machine	Bridge Street Lady	Al Trui
1984
Petong	Amarone	Milk Heart

The Wokingham Stakes is a flat handicap horse race in Great Britain open to horses aged three years or older. It is run at Ascot over a distance of 6 furlongs (1,207 metres), and it is scheduled to take place each year in June.

== History ==
The event is named after Wokingham, a market town several miles to the west of Ascot. It was established in 1813, and the inaugural running was won by Pointers, owned by the Duke of York. For many years the Wokingham Stakes was divided into two or three separate classes, but it became a single race in 1874. A Silver Wokingham was run in 2020 during the COVID-19 pandemic.

The Wokingham Stakes is now contested on the final day of the five-day Royal Ascot meeting.

== Records ==
Most successful horse since 1874 (2 wins):

- Wokingham – 1881, 1882
- Portland Bay – 1908, 1909
- Concerto – 1932, 1933
- Selhurstpark Flyer – 1997, 1998
- Rohaan - 2021, 2022

Leading jockey since 1874 (3 wins):

- Fred Archer – Trappist (1878), Despair (1883), Energy (1884)
- Otto Madden – Oatlands (1894), Kilcock (1896), Minstrel (1898)
- Harry Wragg – Santaquest (1921), Concerto (1932, 1933)
- Jack Sirett – Lucky Jordan (1947), White Cockade (1948), Jupiter (1953)
- Lester Piggott – Malka's Boy (1952), Ginnies Pet (1974), Boone's Cabin (1975)
- Willie Carson – Plummet (1973), Great Eastern (1981), Time Machine (1985)
- Johnny Murtagh – Nice One Clare (2001), Laddies Poker Two (2010), Deacon Blues (2011)

Leading trainer since 1874 (3 wins):

- Joe Cannon – Rosbach (1877), Trappist (1878), Warrior (1880)
- Richard Marsh – Oatlands (1894), Minstrel (1898), Golden Gleam (1906)
- Charles Morton – His Lordship (1902), Portland Bay (1908, 1909)
- Paul Cole – Calibina (1977), Queen's Pride (1980), Bel Byou (1987)

== Winners since 1900 ==
- Weights given in stones and pounds.

Year	Winner	Age	Weight	Jockey	Trainer	SP	Time
1900	Bridge	4	7-12	Skeets Martin	Halsey	7/1
1901	Rose Tree	5	7-09	Charles Thorpe	Corrigan	33/1	1:16.40
1902	His Lordship	3	6-06	John Watts Jnr.	Charles Morton	14/1	1:21.00
1903	Glass Jug	4	7-09	Thomas Miller	Major Beatty	20/1
1904	Out o'Sight	5	8-05	Mornington Cannon	F Hunt	100/12	1:17.40
1905	Queen's Holiday	4	8-02	Bernard Dillon	Jack Fallon	5/2 F	1:16.20
1906	Golden Gleam	4	8-00	Billy Higgs	Richard Marsh	100/8	1:16.60
1907	Forerunner II	3	6-11	Harry Watts	Charles Nugent	33/1
1908	Portland Bay	4	8-02	Walter Griggs	Charles Morton	100/8	1:18.80
1909	Portland Bay	5	8-02	Walter Griggs	Charles Morton	8/1	1:17.00
1910	Galleot	6	8-04	Charlie Trigg	Captain Dewhurst	20/1
1911	Meleager	3	7-06	Jack Evans	Peter Gilpin	20/1	1:17.00
1912	Borrow	4	8-02	Skeets Martin	Andrew Joyner	100/6	1:19.00
1913	Braxted	5	8-00	Fred Herbert	Rogers	100/7	1:16.60
1914	Mount William	3	6-10	Edward Gardner	Farquharson	100/7	1:17.20
1915–18	no race
1919	Scatwell	4	7-11	Fred Slade	Frank Barling	4/1
1920	Golden Orb	4	7-13	Fred Slade	Jack Jarvis	7/4 F	1:16.40
1921	Santaquest	4	7-04	Harry Wragg	Samuel Pickering	100/30 F
1922	Proconsul	4	8-03	Snowy Whalley	Harry Cottrill	25/1	1:14.20
1923	Crowdennis	5	9-02	Bernard Carslake	Atty Persse	100/8	1:18.20
1924	Pandarus	5	7-03	William McLachlan Jnr.	Frank Barling	8/1	1:17.20
1925	Compiler	5	8-01	Jack Brennan	Charles Nugent	20/1	1:16.40
1926	Capture Him	4	8-01	Joseph Thwaites	Charles Archer	20/1	1:23.00
1927	Nothing Venture	4	8-10	Jack Leach	Felix Leach	100/6	1:16.60
1928	Hera	4	7-08	Tom Barber	James Platt	100/6	1:17.20
1929	Six Wheeler	4	7-05	Tommy Weston	Charles Elsey	20/1	1:17.00
1930	Grandmaster	5	7-05	Sir Gordon Richards	Thomas Hogg	5/1 F	1:17.20
1931	Heronslea	4	8-07	Joseph Taylor	Matthew Peacock	100/30 F	1:17.00
1932	Concerto	4	8-06	Harry Wragg	Ossie Bell	9/2	1:16.20
1933	Concerto	5	9-03	Harry Wragg	Ossie Bell	4/1 F	1:18.20
1934	Coroado	4	8-09	Herbert Gunn	William Easterby	11/4 F	1:17.20
1935	Theio	3	7-05	Eph Smith	Jack Jarvis	33/1	1:18.80
1936	Cora Deans	4	7-11	Steve Donoghue	Basil Jarvis	7/1	1:19.00
1937	Kong	4	6-12	Frank Sharpe	Norman Scobie	33/1	1:16.60
1938	Bold Ben	4	8-09	Charlie Elliott	Sam Armstrong	9/1	1:15.80
1939	America	4	8-12	Bobby Jones	Henri Jelliss	20/1	1:21.60
1940–44	no race
1945	Portamara	4	7-05	Doug Smith	John Beary	20/1	1:17.00
1946	The Bug	3	8-07	Charlie Smirke	Gerald Wellesley	7/1	1:17.60
1947	Lucky Jordan	4	7-06	Jack Sirett	A Boyd	33/1	1:18.20
1948	White Cockade	4	7-07	Jack Sirett	Ted Leader	33/1	1:19.20
1949	The Cobbler	4	9-04	Sir Gordon Richards	Noel Murless	4/1 F	1:17.00
1950	Blue Book	3	7-11	Edgar Britt	Marcus Marsh	100/6	1:17.00
1951	Donore	4	8-05	Harry Carr	Cecil Boyd-Rochfort	100/9 F	1:18.20
1952	Malka's Boy	4	8-10	Lester Piggott	Walter Nightingall	100/6	1:17.40
1953	Jupiter	3	7-03	Jack Sirett	Rufus Beasley	22/1	1:20.00
1954	March Past	4	9-00	Bill Rickaby	Ken Cundell	15/2 F	1:18.00
1955	The Plumber's Mate	4	6-09	Duncan Keith	Herbert Smyth	25/1	1:16.11
1956	Light Harvest	4	7-12	Joe Sime	Jack Waugh	100/6	1:15.79
1957	Dionisio	4	8-10	Edgar Britt	Charles Elsey	5/1	1:13.78
1958	Magic Boy	5	7-05	Derrick Greening	M Bolton	20/1	1:16.48
1959	Golden Leg	4	7-01	Bobby Elliott	Michael Pope	33/1	1:14.74
1960	Silver King	4	7-11	Joe Sime	Sam Hall	15/2 F	1:15.02
1961	Whistler's Daughter	4	8-06	Joe Sime	Sam Hall	10/1 CF	1:17.11
1962	Elco	4	8-13	Bill Williamson	Boggy Whelan	20/1	1:17.64
1963	Marcher	3	7-12	Ron Hutchinson	Dave Hanley	100/8	1:18.93
1964	Abandoned due to waterlogging
1965	Nunshoney	3	7-02	David East	George Beeby	33/1	1:19.57
1966	My Audrey	5	8-02	George Cadwaladr	Eric Cousins	20/1	1:18.10
1967	Spaniard's Mount	5	8-06	Doug Smith	John Winter	100/6	1:18.28
1968	Charicles	3	7-06	David East	Teddy Lambton	100/7	1:17.52
1969	Sky Rocket	4	7-03	Pat Eddery	Michael Pope	20/1	1:19.45
1970	Virginia Boy	4	7-04	Dennis McKay	Doug Smith	100/9	1:13.70
1971	Whistling Fool	5	7-07	Dennis McKay	Doug Smith	11/2	1:22.19
1972	Le Johnstan	4	9-05	Geoff Lewis	John Sutcliffe	9/1	1:16.39
1973	Plummet	4	8-02	Willie Carson	John Sutcliffe	11/1	1:17.66
1974	Ginnies Pet	4	8-06	Lester Piggott	John Sutcliffe	7/1	1:13.85
1975	Boone's Cabin	5	10-00	Lester Piggott	Vincent O'Brien	6/1	1:14.73
1976	Import	5	9-04	Taffy Thomas	Bill Wightman	4/1 F	1:16.67
1977	Calibina	5	8-05	Geoff Baxter	Paul Cole	14/1	1:16.06
1978	Equal Opportunity	4	7-12	Bob Curant	P Arthur	20/1	1:16.43
1979	Lord Rochfort	4	8-08	Steve Raymont	Brian Swift	16/1	1:15.30
1980	Queen's Pride	4	7-13	Geoff Baxter	Paul Cole	28/1	1:16.10
1981	Great Eastern	4	9-08	Willie Carson	John Dunlop	16/1	1:15.25
1982	Battle Hymn	3	7-07	Tony Clark	Guy Harwood	16/1	1:15.38
1983	Melindra	4	7-05	Tony McGlone	David Elsworth	7/1 F	1:13.95
1984	Petong	4	9-06	Bruce Raymond	Michael Jarvis	11/1 JF	1:15.96
1985	Time Machine	4	7-12	Willie Carson	Pat Hughes	10/1	1:15.40
1986	Touch of Grey	3	8-08	Taffy Thomas	David Thom	20/1	1:13.48
1987	Bel Byou	3	8-03	Richard Quinn	Paul Cole	11/2 F	1:20.00
1988	Powder Blue	6	8-05	Tony Ives	Peter Makin	28/1	1:14.25
1989	Mac's Fighter	4	9-12	Cash Asmussen	Bill O'Gorman	16/1	1:14.62
1990	Knight of Mercy	4	8-06	Pat Eddery	Richard Hannon Sr.	16/1	1:15.31
1991	Amigo Menor	5	8-07	Chris Rutter	David Murray Smith	14/1	1:14.81
1992	Red Rosein	6	8-01	Gary Carter	Captain Jim Wilson	33/1	1:14.14
1993	Nagida	4	8-07	Jason Weaver	James Toller	11/1	1:18.11
1994	Venture Capitalist	5	8-12	John Reid	Richard Hannon Sr.	20/1	1:15.38
1995	Astrac	4	8-07	Seb Sanders	Reg Akehurst	14/1	1:13.43
1996	Emerging Market	4	8-13	Kevin Darley	John Dunlop	33/1	1:13.83
1997	Selhurstpark Flyer	6	8-09	Paul Roberts	Jack Berry	25/1	1:15.31
1998	Selhurstpark Flyer	7	9-07	Carl Lowther	Jack Berry	16/1	1:15.57
1999	Deep Space	4	8-07	Gary Carter	Ed Dunlop	14/1	1:13.99
2000	Harmonic Way	5	9-06	Richard Hughes	Roger Charlton	12/1	1:15.49
2001	Nice One Clare	5	9-03	Johnny Murtagh	Pip Payne	7/1 F	1:13.12
2002	Capricho	5	8-11	Richard Quinn	Jon Akehurst	20/1	1:14.76
2003 (dh)	Fayr Jag; Ratio	4; 5	9-06; 9-03	Willie Supple; Frankie Dettori	Tim Easterby; John Hammond	10/1; 14/1	1:12.18
2004	Lafi	5	8-13	Eddie Ahern	David Nicholls	6/1 F	1:14.15
2005 ^{[a]}	Iffraaj	4	9-06	Philip Robinson	Michael Jarvis	9/4 F	1:08.74
2006	Baltic King	6	9-10	Jimmy Fortune	Hughie Morrison	10/1	1:13.15
2007	Dark Missile	4	8-06	William Buick	Andrew Balding	22/1	1:14.91
2008	Big Timer	4	9-02	Tom Eaves	Linda Perratt	20/1	1:14.37
2009	High Standing	4	8-12	Ryan Moore	William Haggas	6/1	1:14.19
2010	Laddies Poker Two	5	8-11	Johnny Murtagh	Jeremy Noseda	9/2 F	1:12.27
2011	Deacon Blues	4	8-13	Johnny Murtagh	James Fanshawe	15/2	1:16.90
2012	Dandy Boy	6	9-08	Pat Dobbs	David Marnane	33/1	1:13.87
2013	York Glory	5	9-02	Jamie Spencer	Kevin Ryan	14/1	1:13.79
2014	Baccarat	5	9-02	George Chaloner	Richard Fahey	9/1	1:12.09
2015	Interception	5	9-03	George Baker	David Lanigan	10/1	1:13.20
2016	Outback Traveller	5	9-01	Martin Harley	Robert Cowell	10/1	1:14.05
2017	Out Do	8	8-13	Daniel Tudhope	David O'Meara	25/1	1:13.02
2018	Bacchus	4	9-06	Jim Crowley	Brian Meehan	33/1	1:12.43
2019	Cape Byron	5	9-09	Andrea Atzeni	Roger Varian	7/2 F	1:11.72
2020	Hey Jonesy	5	9-03	Kevin Stott	Kevin Ryan	18/1	1:13.49
2021	Rohaan	3	9-08	Shane Kelly	David Evans	8/1	1:15.09
2022	Rohaan	4	9-12	Ryan Moore	David Evans	18/1	1:12.84
2023	Saint Lawrence	5	9-02	Hollie Doyle	Archie Watson	22/1	1:12.55
2024	Unequal Love	4	9-07	Tom Marquand	William Haggas	12/1	1:13.04
2025	Get It	7	9-03	Seamie Heffernan	George Baker	28/1	1:11.40
2026	Double Rush	4	9-09	Shane Foley	Andrew Balding	5/1	1:11.97

^{a} The 2005 running took place at York.

== Earlier winners ==
- 1874: Josephine
- 1875: Albanus
- 1876: The Mandarin
- 1877: Rosbach
- 1878: Trappist
- 1879: Philippine
- 1880: Warrior
- 1881: Wokingham
- 1882: Wokingham
- 1883: Despair
- 1884: Energy
- 1885: Corunna
- 1886: Loved One
- 1887: Everitt
- 1888: Annamite
- 1889: Bret Harte
- 1890: Day Dawn
- 1891: Rathbeal
- 1892: Hildebert
- 1893: Pitcher
- 1894: Oatlands
- 1895: Hebron
- 1896: Kilcock
- 1897: El Diablo
- 1898: Minstrel
- 1899: Eager

== See also ==
- Horse racing in Great Britain
- List of British flat horse races
