= The Bug (horse) =

Irish-bred Thoroughbred racehorse

- Sire: Signal Light
- Grandsire: Pharos
- Dam: Flying Meteor
- Damsire: Flying Orb
- Sex: Stallion
- Foaled: 1943
- Country: Ireland
- Colour: Chestnut
- Breeder: Mary Ellard or S. Donoghue
- Owner: Norman Wachman
- Trainer: Gerald Wellesley; Marcus Marsh
- Record: 14:10-1-0
- Earnings: £10,748

Major wins
- Wokingham Stakes (1946); July Cup (1946); Nunthorpe Stakes (1946); Diadem Stakes (1946); Cork and Orrery Stakes (1947)

Awards
- Timeform equal top-rated older horse (1947); Timeform rating 135

The Bug (1943–1963) was an Irish-bred Thoroughbred racehorse and sire. A specialist sprinter, he was trained first in Ireland and then in Britain during a racing career which lasted from 1945 until September 1947. After being beaten in his first three races he recorded ten consecutive victories including the Wokingham Stakes, July Cup, Nunthorpe Stakes, Diadem Stakes and Cork and Orrery Stakes. He was then injured and finished unplaced in his comeback race, ending with a record of ten wins from fourteen races. He was retired to stud where he had little success as a sire of winners.

== Background ==
The Bug was an unimpressive-looking, lightly built chestnut horse, with a white blaze and a white sock on his right hind leg. He was bred in County Limerick, Ireland, by either Mary Ellard or S. Donoghue. As a yearling The Bug was sent to the Ballsbridge sales where he was bought for 700 guineas by the Hon. Gerald "Ginger" Wellesley, a relative of the Duke of Wellington. The colt raced in the colours of Norman Wachman, a boot and shoe manufacturer, as well as a noted gambler, and was trained by Wellesley at Castleknock, County Dublin.

The Bug was sired by Signal Light, an Irish-bred stallion who won the Craven Stakes at Newmarket Racecourse in 1939. Apart from The Bug, the best of his progeny was probably Big Dipper, the top-rated British two-year-old of 1950. His dam Flying Meteor came from an undistinguished branch of Thoroughbred family 2-d, although she was distantly related to the Derby Italiano winner Bellini.

== Racing career ==
=== 1945: two-year-old season ===
Wellesley sent out The Bug to race five times in Ireland in 1945. He was unplaced in his first two starts and was strongly supported in the betting when finishing second in his next race. Late in the season he won two minor races. The Bug was never an easy horse to manage: on one occasion he escaped from the stables and ran loose around the local countryside until he was led home by a police officer who used his bootlaces to fashion a makeshift head collar.

=== 1946: three-year-old season ===
In early 1946, The Bug won two races at Phoenix Park Racecourse, carrying large weights in handicap races before being sent to race in England for the first time. In April at Liverpool Racecourse he won the Knowsley Stakes over one mile. In June he reverted to sprint distances when he ran in the Wokingham Stakes, a six furlong handicap at Royal Ascot in which he was ridden by Charlie Smirke, who became his regular jockey. He started at odds of 7/1 and won easily carrying 119 pounds, setting a weight-carrying record for a three-year-old in a race first run in 1874. His victory reportedly landed a huge gamble for Norman Wachman. The "tactics" employed on The Bug in this race were typical: he started quickly, took the lead, and had his opponents struggling to match his speed from the early stages. A month later he was back in England for the July Cup, one of the season's most important weight-for-age sprints over six furlongs at Newmarket. He started the 8/11 favourite and won from Honeyway, a five-year-old who had won the race in the 1945.

After his win in the July Cup, The Bug was transferred to England for the rest of his career, joining the Newmarket stable of Marcus Marsh. Marsh found that the horse was a challenging one to manage: he had fragile legs and back problems which meant that he had to be trained with great care. In August, The Bug moved down in distance for the Nunthorpe Stakes over five furlongs at York Racecourse, where he won by one and a half lengths from the previous year's winner Golden Cloud. Press reports described the performance as a "dazzling run" which confirmed The Bug's status as the best sprinter in England. On his final start of the season, The Bug took the inaugural running of the Diadem Stakes over six furlongs at Ascot. By this time he was being described by some observers as "phenomenal" and "one of the fastest horses in living memory".

=== 1947: four-year-old season ===
The Bug returned as a four-year-old but his training problems worsened and he made only two appearances. In June he returned to Royal Ascot where he won the Cork and Orrery Stakes by four lengths but sustained a back injury shortly afterwards which kept him off the course until autumn. At Ascot in September he moved up in distance for the one mile Queen Elizabeth II Stakes in which he was matched against the 2000 Guineas winner Tudor Minstrel. The Bug's back injury recurred during the race and he finished unplaced, sustaining his first defeat for two years.

== Assessment ==
The independent Timeform organisation did not publish an annual for 1946, and so The Bug did not receive a rating in his best season. In 1947 he was rated on 135, the third highest of the year behind Tudor Minstrel (144) and the two-year-old My Babu (136), and equal to the French-trained stayers Souverain and Chanteur.

In their book A Century of Champions, based on a modified version of the Timeform system, John Randall and Tony Morris rated The Bug the best British or Irish-trained horse of his generation and the tenth-best British or Irish-trained sprinter of the 20th century.

== Stud career ==
The Bug was retired to stud for the 1948 breeding season but proved a disappointing sire. His only winner of any consequence was Gillylees, a filly who won the Fern Hill Stakes at Ascot in 1958. The Bug died in 1963.

== Pedigree ==
Pedigree of The Bug (IRE), chestnut stallion, 1943
Sire Signal Light (IRE) 1936	Pharos (GB); 1920	Phalaris	Polymelus
Sire Signal Light (IRE) 1936	Pharos (GB); 1920	Phalaris	Bromus
Sire Signal Light (IRE) 1936	Pharos (GB); 1920	Scapa Flow	Chaucer
Sire Signal Light (IRE) 1936	Pharos (GB); 1920	Scapa Flow	Anchora
Sire Signal Light (IRE) 1936	Ensoleillee (GB); 1926	Sunstar	Sundridge
Sire Signal Light (IRE) 1936	Ensoleillee (GB); 1926	Sunstar	Doris
Sire Signal Light (IRE) 1936	Ensoleillee (GB); 1926	Laughter	Pommern
Sire Signal Light (IRE) 1936	Ensoleillee (GB); 1926	Laughter	Jest
Dam Flying Meteor (GB) 1930	Flying Orb (GB); 1911	Orby	Orme
Dam Flying Meteor (GB) 1930	Flying Orb (GB); 1911	Orby	Rhoda B
Dam Flying Meteor (GB) 1930	Flying Orb (GB); 1911	Stella	Necromancer
Dam Flying Meteor (GB) 1930	Flying Orb (GB); 1911	Stella	Hollyleaf
Dam Flying Meteor (GB) 1930	Reformation (GB); 1918	The Convert	Desmond
Dam Flying Meteor (GB) 1930	Reformation (GB); 1918	The Convert	Eudoxia
Dam Flying Meteor (GB) 1930	Reformation (GB); 1918	Cymruminn	Llangibby
Dam Flying Meteor (GB) 1930	Reformation (GB); 1918	Cymruminn	Minnow (Family:2-d)
