= Beech House Stud =

Racehorse breeding farm in Newmarket, Suffolk, England

Coordinates: 52°13′54″N 0°26′51″E

Beech House Stud is an English Thoroughbred racehorse breeding farm located on Cheveley Road near Newmarket, Suffolk currently owned by Sheikh Hamdan bin Rashid Al Maktoum's Shadwell Racing operation.

Originally a land parcel within the Cheveley Park Stud of Col. Harry L. B. McCalmont, it was purchased by Charles Hackford who sold it in 1930 to Martin H. Benson. Benson developed Beech House Stud into a major breeding operation. Among the sires he owned was Windsor Lad, winner of the 1934 Epsom Derby and St. Leger Stakes and in 1935, the Coronation Cup and Eclipse Stakes.

In 1938, Benson purchased the unbeaten Italian-bred Nearco from owner/breeder Federico Tesio for £60,000. The Leading sire in Great Britain & Ireland in 1947 and 1949, and an important sire of the 20th century, Nearco's legacy stems primarily from three of his sons: Nasrullah, Royal Charger, and Nearctic who sired Northern Dancer.

In 1960, Beech House Stud became part of the substantial Thoroughbred racing holdings of Sir Victor Sassoon whose Epsom Derby winners Crepello and St. Paddy stood at stud here. Sassoon died in 1961 and although his widow continued the racing operations for a time, eventually Beech House Stud was sold to the Italian banker Carlo Vittadini, notably the owner of Grundy.

Buried at Beech House Stud:

- Nearco (1935–1957)
- St. Paddy (1957–1984)
