= List of honorary knighthoods in India =

Before the Republic of India was established on 26 January 1950, all Indian subjects of the princely states and Indian rulers were entitled to substantive knighthoods (the Order of the Star of India and the Order of the Indian Empire).

The following is a partial list of honorary British knighthoods as given to Indian rulers and members of the ruling families up to 1947 (the Order of the Star of India and the Order of the Indian Empire were considered substantive). Rulers of states that are presently part of what is now Pakistan are included in this article. The order moves from the most prestigious states (21-guns) to least prestigious (9-guns).

Note that this list does not include knighthoods awarded by the various Royal Houses in India, which are described in the articles of the individual princely states. This list also does not include orders of knighthood granted to Indian rulers by other foreign countries, such as France.

== Rulers by Indian princely state ==
=== 21-gun salute ===
Hyderabad

- Mir Mahbub Ali Khan - GCB (1902)
- Asaf Jah VII - GBE (1917)
- Azam Jah - GBE (1943)

Mysore

- Krishnaraja Wodeyar IV - GBE (1917)
- Jayachamarajendra Wodeyar - GCB (1946)

Jammu and Kashmir

- Ram Singh of Jammu and Kashmir - KCB (1895)
- Partab Singh of Kashmir - GBE (1918)
- Hari Singh - GCVO (1946), KCVO (1922)
- Khan Bahhadur Akram Ali Khan. - GBE (1940)

Gwalior

- Jayajirao Scindia - GCB (1877)
- Madho Rao Scindia - GCVO (1902), GBE (1917)

=== 19-gun salute ===
Bhopal

- Sultan Kaikhusrau Jahan Begum - GBE (1917)

Kolhapur

- Shahu IV - GCVO (1903)

=== 17-gun salute ===
Kotah

- Umed Singhji II - GBE (1918)

Bahawalpur (now in Pakistan)

- Sadeq Mohammad Khan V - KCVO (1922)

Bikaner

- Ganga Singh - GCVO(1919), GBE (1921), KCB (1918)

Cutch

- Vijayaraji - GBE (1945)

Jodhpur

- Sumair Singh - KBE (1918)
- Umaid Singh - KCVO (1922)

Patiala

- Bhupinder Singh - GCVO (1922), GBE (1918)
- Yadavindra Singh - GBE (1942)

=== 15-gun salute ===
Dholpur

- Udaybhanu Singh - KCVO (1922)

Dhar

- Udajirao II - KCVO (1922), KBE (1917)

Idar

- Pratap Singh of Idar - GCB (1918), KCB (1901), GCVO (1911)

Rampur

- Hamid Ali Khan Bahadur - GCVO (1911)

Swat (now part of Pakistan)

- Abdul Wadud - KBE (1930)

=== 13-gun salute ===
Kapurthala

- Jagatjit Singh Bahadur - GBE (1927)

Nawanagar

- K.S. Ranjitsinhji - GBE (1919)

Ratlam

- Sajjan Singh of Ratlam - KCVO (1922)

Jaora

- Muhammad Ifthikar Ali Khan Bahadur - GBE (1937)

Palanpur

- Taley Muhammad Khan Bahadur - KCVO (1922)

Rajpipla

- Vijaysinhji Chhatrasinhji - GBE (1945)

Tripura

- Bir Bikram Kishore - GBE (1946)

=== 11-gun salute ===
Assam

Hiralal Phukan -1917(A.D.)

Received the Order of British India First Class in the Delhi Durbar.

Narendra Nath Phukan -1941

For fighting courageous in the Second World War. And, also received the Indian Recruiting Badge.

Morvi

- Lakhdhiraji Waghji - GBE (1939)

Narsingarh

- Jodhpuriji Shri Huzur Rani Bapu Shiv Kanwarji Sahiba, Rani of Narsingarh - DBE (1924)

== Religious heads ==
=== The Aga Khan ===
As a religious head, the Aga Khan is not a monarch per se, but until 1947 merited a 13-gun salute, and is entitled to a royal style

- Aga Khan III-GCMG, GCVO
- Aga Khan IV-KBE (2003)

== Political pensioners ==
Those ruling families had lost ruling rights by the 20th century.

Murshidabad (entitled to a 19-gun personal salute)

- Nawab Sayyid Wasif Ali Mirza Khan-KCVO (1912)

== See also ==
- Order of the Sun
- Order of the Star of Honour
