= Charlie Smirke =

British flat-race jockey (1906–1993)

Charles Smirke
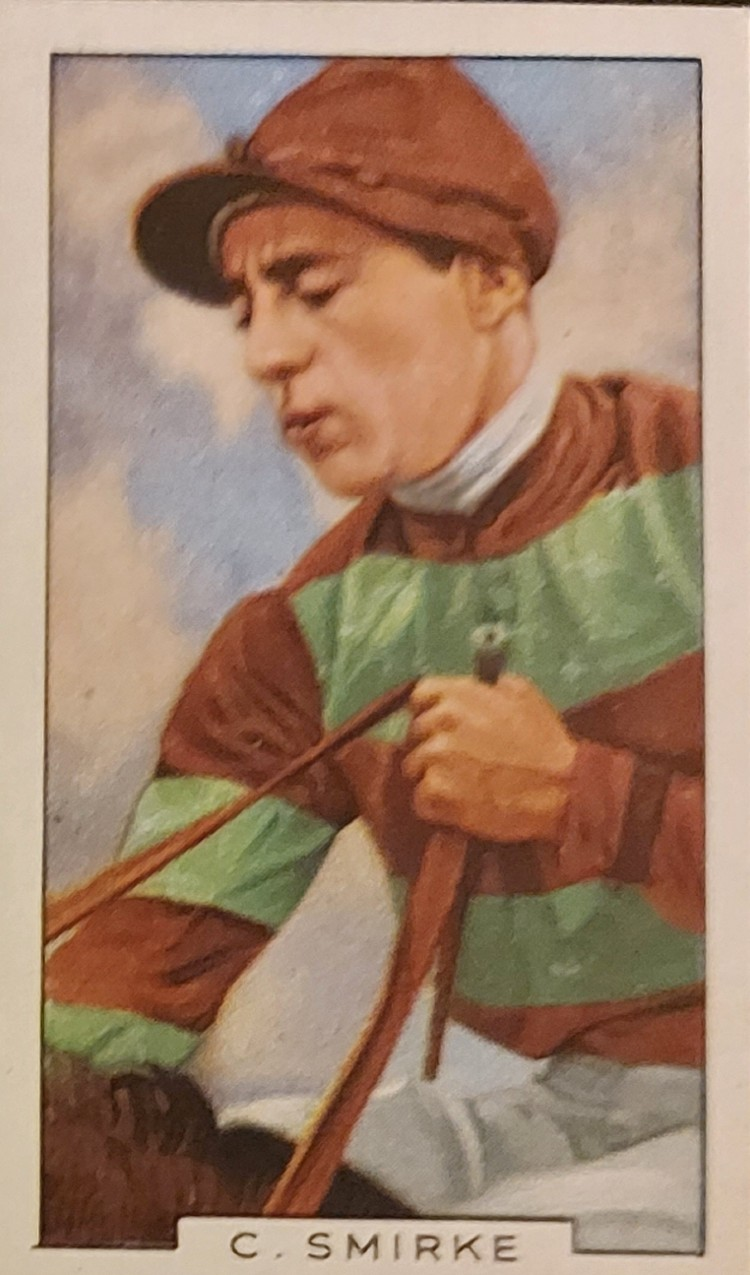
- Charlie Smirke, in the colours of HH Aga Khan (Gallaher's cigarette card, 1936)

Personal information
- Born: 23 September 1906 Lambeth, England, United Kingdom
- Died: 30 December 1993 (aged 87)
- Occupation: Jockey

Horse racing career
- Sport: Horse racing

Major racing wins
- British Classic Race wins: 2,000 Guineas (2); 1,000 Guineas (1); Epsom Oaks (0); Epsom Derby (4); St. Leger Stakes (4)

Racing awards
- British flat racing Champion Apprentice (1925, 1926)

Significant horses
- Windsor Lad, Bahram, Mahmoud, The Bug, My Babu, Tulyar, Never Say Die, Hard Ridden

Charles James William Smirke (1906–1993) was a British flat-race jockey. In a career that lasted from 1920 until 1959, he rode the winners of eleven British Classic Races. As a rider, he was known for his skill, strength and tactical intelligence, together with his self-confident and outspoken personality. Although he never won the Championship, he was regarded as one of the best jockeys of his era. The Racing Post ranked him as the fifth greatest jockey of the 20th Century and the greatest never to have been champion.

== Background ==
Charlie Smirke was born in Lambeth, a working-class district of London in 1906. His family had no racing connections, his father being a fruit and fish dealer. After leaving school at the age of thirteen, Smirke left home to become an apprentice jockey. He has living children and grandchildren.

== Riding career ==
=== Apprenticeship and suspension: 1920–1933 ===
Smirke was apprenticed to the trainer Stanley Wootton at his Treadwell House stable at Epsom. He had his first ride in 1920 riding at a weight of 89 pounds. He recorded his first win at the age of fifteen in April 1922. While still an apprentice, Smirke rode regularly for leading owners, accepting retainers from Solomon Joel, the Maharaja of Rajpipla and the Aga Khan and winning races such as the Chester Cup and the Queen's Vase. During his time as an apprentice jockey, Smirke became an accomplished amateur boxer, an achievement which would prove useful in later years. Smirke rode 314 winners during his apprenticeship and was Champion Apprentice in 1925 and 1926.

In 1928, the year after leaving his apprenticeship, Smirke became stable jockey for the Newmarket trainer Victor Gilpin. In August, his mount, Welcome Gift refused to start in a race at Gatwick. The racecourse stewards took the view that Smirke had made no attempt to start the race and reported him to the Jockey Club. In September, Smirke's riding licence was revoked and he was banned from any involvement in racing (“warned off”). Smirke's ban lasted for five years, during which time he supported himself with a variety of menial jobs, including acting as a sparring partner for professional boxers.

=== Comeback and military service: 1933–1945 ===
Smirke's licence was restored in October 1933. Within a year, he had reached the top of his profession by winning the Derby for the Vijayasinhji Chhatrasinhji, the Maharaja of Rajpipla on Windsor Lad and completing a classic double on the same horse (by now co-owned by Martin H. Benson) with his triumph in the St Leger. In 1935, he added a second St Leger on Bahram (substituting for the injured Freddie Fox) for the Aga Khan who retained him as his first jockey for the following year. Despite a difficult working relationship with the Aga Khan's trainer, Frank Butters, Smirke enjoyed further success when winning the 1936 Derby on Mahmoud. At the outbreak of war in 1939, the Aga Khan moved his horses from Newmarket, but Smirke continued to ride important winners including the St Leger on Turkhan in 1940.

In 1941, Smirke was called up for military service and spent the next four years in the Army, serving as an anti-aircraft gunner and a driver. When the war ended, he resumed his riding career at the age of thirty-eight.

=== Post-war career: 1945–1959 ===
Smirke had no regular stable after the war but had immediate success as a freelance. In 1946, he re-established himself as a leading jockey with a series of wins on the outstanding sprinter The Bug. He rode for the Maharaja of Baroda for two seasons, winning the 2000 Guineas on My Babu before resuming his association with the Aga Khan in 1949. He appeared in the 1951 comedy film The Galloping Major as himself. Among his most significant winners in this phase of his career were Palestine (2000 Guineas) and Tulyar (Derby, St Leger) before his contract ended at the end of 1952. Riding as a freelance, he won the Washington, D.C. International Stakes on Worden and the 1954 St.Leger on Never Say Die (replacing the suspended Lester Piggott). In 1957, Smirke was riding for the Aga Khan yet again and moved to France where most of the owner's horses were based, but, although he won the 1000 Guineas on Rose Royale, he was unable to establish a working relationship with Alec Head, and the arrangement was soon ended.

By then over fifty, and without a regular contract, Smirke had fewer rides in his last three years, but retained much of his ability. He rode only three winners in 1958, but they included his fourth Derby on Hard Ridden. Smirke retired at the end of the 1959 season. He had little contact with the racing world after his retirement, devoting much of his time to golf.

Smirke died at Leatherhead, Surrey on 20 December 1993. There is a memorial to him at the rear of Randalls Park Crematorium. In 1999, the Racing Post ranked him fifth in their list of the Top 50 jockeys of the 20th century and the greatest never to have been Champion Jockey.
