= The First Born (1928 film) =

1928 film

- Miles Mander and Madeleine Carroll
- Directed by: Miles Mander
- Written by: Miles Mander; Alma Reville
- Produced by: Michael Balcon; C. M. Woolf; Miles Mander
- Starring: Madeleine Carroll; Miles Mander; John Loder; Ella Atherton
- Cinematography: Walter Blakeley
- Edited by: Arthur Tavares
- Production company: Gainsborough Pictures
- Distributed by: Woolf & Freedman Film Service
- Release date: October 1928
- Running time: 101 minutes
- Country: United Kingdom
- Languages: Silent film English intertitles

The First Born is a 1928 British silent drama film directed by Miles Mander and starring Mander, Madeleine Carroll, John Loder and Ella Atherton. It was made by Gainsborough Pictures at Elstree Studios. The film's sets were designed by the art director Wilfred Arnold.

== Production background ==
The screenplay was also written by Mander (based on his own novel) in conjunction with Alma Reville. The First Born enjoys a good critical reputation, being seen as stylistically inventive and one of the best examples of a trend in British cinema in the last years of the silent era. This trend was towards a more mature, sophisticated and naturalistic presentation of dramatic material, eschewing the tendency in earlier silent films towards overly stagey and melodramatic acting styles involving wildly exaggerated gestures and facial expressions.

== Plot ==
Would-be politician Sir Hugo Boycott (Mander) and his wife Madeleine (Carroll) have an unhappy marriage. Madeleine is aware that Hugo is a serial philanderer, and their problems are exacerbated when she fails to produce the heir he wants. After a particularly serious quarrel, Hugo storms off to North Africa and one of his mistresses. In his absence, Madeleine drifts around in London society where she is courted by Lord David Harbrough (John Loder). She rebuffs his advances, but finds him sympathetic as an individual and agrees that they should remain friends.

Madeleine learns that her manicurist is expecting a baby and is in a desperate state as she is unmarried and facing shame, the loss of her job and destitution. Madeleine offers to adopt the baby when it is born, which the manicurist gladly accepts. Hugo later returns from Africa and is delighted with the new son and heir which he assumes is his. Relations between the couple improve for a time, and Madeleine gives birth to her own baby. Hugo makes progress in his political ambitions and is invited to stand for parliament in an upcoming General Election. His political associates and potential constituents are charmed by Madeleine. It has not taken long however for him to revert to his womanising ways, and he becomes involved with the devious Nina (Ella Atherton).

As the election approaches, Hugo finds out that the older boy is adopted, not his own child. He and Madeleine have a furious argument and he leaves to stay with Nina. On election night he is in a state of tension. He now quarrels with Nina also, stomps out of her apartment in a temper, and in a moment of inattention steps into an empty liftshaft and falls to his death. After his death, Madeleine receives a letter from the manicurist who has met a man who is willing to take on her and her son, she also unknowingly reveals in an ironic twist that Hugo was actually Stephen's father. In the wake of Hugo's death and the new revelations, Madeleine resolves to rekindle her romance with Lord David in the hope that she can finally find happiness.

== Cast ==
- Madeleine Carroll as Madeleine, Lady Boycott
- Miles Mander as Sir Hugo Boycott
- John Loder as Lord David Harbrough
- Ella Atherton as Nina de Lande
- Margot Armand as Sylvia Findlay
- Ivo Dawson as Derek Findlay
- Marjorie Roach as Phoebe Chivers
- John St. John as Dicky
- Naomi Jacob as Dot
- Bernard Vaughan as Butler
- Walter Wichelow as Impitt
- Theodore Mander as Stephen Boycott
