= Nearco =

Italian-bred Thoroughbred racehorse

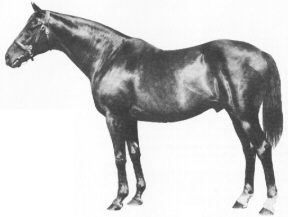
- Nearco
- Sire: Pharos (GB)
- Grandsire: Phalaris
- Dam: Nogara
- Damsire: Havresac
- Sex: Stallion
- Foaled: January 24, 1935
- Died: June 27, 1957 (aged 22)
- Country: Italy
- Colour: Brown
- Breeder: Federico Tesio
- Owner: Federico Tesio
- Trainer: Federico Tesio
- Record: 14: 14–0–0
- Earnings: $86,328 (converted from earnings in Italy and France)

Major wins
- Gran Criterium (1937); Premio Tevere (1937); Premio Chiusura (1937); Derby Italiano (1938); Premio Parioli (1938); Gran Premio di Milano (1938); Gran Premio d'Italia (1938); Grand Prix de Paris (1938)

Awards
- Italian champion two-year-old (1937); Italian champion three-year-old (1938); Italian Horse of the Year (1938); Leading sire in GB & Ireland (1947, 1948); Leading broodmare sire in Britain & Ireland (1955, 1956)

Nearco (January 24, 1935 – June 27, 1957) was an Italian-bred Thoroughbred racehorse described by Thoroughbred Heritage as "one of the greatest racehorses of the Twentieth Century" and "one of the most important sires of the century." He was unbeaten, winning 14 races at distances from 1000m (5 furlongs) to 3000m (1 mile 7 furlongs), including the Derby Italiano and Grand Prix de Paris. He was then sold for a record amount to Martin H. Benson and stood stud in England, where he became the patriarch of several of the most dominant sire lines in Thoroughbred history.

== Breeding ==
Nearco was bred in Italy by Federico Tesio, who also bred several other champions including the undefeated Ribot. His dam was the excellent racemare Nogara, who had won the Italian 1000 and 2000 guineas and was Italian champion filly at ages two and three. In 1934, Tesio wished to breed Nogara to the leading English sire Fairway, but was unable to obtain a nomination. Therefore, Tesio chose to breed Nogara to Fairway's full brother, Pharos.

Nearco stood just over 16 hands (64 inches, 163 cm) and had nearly perfect conformation. He was known for his fiery temperament and explosive turn of foot, traits he passed on to many of his descendants. After retiring to stud, Nearco could only be handled by his groom Ernie Lee.

== Racing record ==
=== Two-year-old season ===
In 1937, Nearco won all seven of his starts on his way to being named Italian champion two-year-old. His races were as follows:

| Date | Race | Location | Distance |
|---|---|---|---|
| June 1937 | Premio Colico | San Siro | 1000m |
| September 1937 | Premio Menaggio | San Siro | 1200m |
| September 1937 | Premio Vimercate | San Siro | 1200m |
| September 1937 | Criterium Nazionale | San Siro | 1200m |
| October 1937 | Gran Criterium | San Siro | 1500m |
| October 1937 | Premio Tevere | Capannelle | 1600m |
| November 1937 | Premio Chiusura | San Siro | 1400m |

In his 1986 book Makers of the Modern Thoroughbred, Peter Willett wrote that Tesio tried to sell Nearco at two, believing that the colt would not have enough stamina to last the classic distances. Tesio later wrote in his stud book, "Not a true stayer, though he won up to 3,000 meters... He won these longer races by his superb class and brilliant speed."

=== Three-year-old season ===
In 1938, Nearco again won all seven starts and was named Italian champion three-year-old and Horse of the Year. His races were as follows:

| Date | Race | Location | Distance |
|---|---|---|---|
| February 1938 | Premio Ministero Agricoltura e Foreste | Pisa | 1400m |
| April 1938 | Premio Parioli (Italian 2,000 Guineas) | Capannelle | 1600m |
| May 1938 | Premio Principe Emanuele Filliberto | San Siro | 2000m |
| May 1938 | Gran Premio del Re Imperatore (Derby Italiano) | Capannelle | 2400m |
| May 1938 | Gran Premio d'Italia | San Siro | 2400m |
| June 1938 | Gran Premio di Milano | San Siro | 3000m |
| June 1938 | Grand Prix de Paris | Longchamp | 3000m |

== Stud career ==
Nearco retired undefeated after 14 races. With the political turmoil and the possibility of war caused by Benito Mussolini aligning Italy with Nazi Germany, Federico Tesio sold Nearco in 1938 to Martin H. Benson of Beech House Stud in Newmarket, England, for £60,000 (a world record for a sire in those days; equivalent to £4,839,000 in 2023). The potential importance of Nearco's progeny was forecast in the provision of a bomb shelter to ensure his survival should Newmarket be subject to an air raid.

Nearco was one of the top 10 sires in England for 15 years. He was the leading sire in Great Britain and Ireland in 1947 and, depending on the source, either 1948 or 1949 or both. From 482 named foals, he sired 273 winners (56.6%) and 87 stakes winners (18.0%). His major stakes winners include:

- Nasrullah, top rated two-year-old of 1942
- Dante, 1945 Epsom Derby
- Royal Charger, 1946 Queen Anne Stakes
- Sayajirao, 1947 St. Leger Stakes
- Masaka, 1948 Epsom and Irish Oaks
- Nimbus, 1949 Epsom Derby and 2,000 Guineas
- Mossborough, sire of Ballymoss
- Neasham Belle, 1951 Epsom Oaks
- Hafiz, 1955 Queen Elizabeth II and Champion Stakes
- Nearctic, 1958 Canadian Horse of the Year

Nearco was also the damsire of the French multiple Group One winner Charlottesville, and damsire of the Epsom Derby winners Arctic Prince (1948) and Tulyar (1952).

Nearco died from cancer on 27 June 1957, and was buried at Beech House Stud.

== Sire of sires ==
Nearco's legacy primarily comes from three of his sons, Nasrullah, Royal Charger and Nearctic, although several other sons also sired important winners. In all, more than 100 of Nearco's sons have stood at stud around the world.

Nasrullah was the first son of Nearco to distinguish himself as a sire, first in England and then in America. Nasrullah's important sire sons include:

- Grey Sovereign, to whom 2016 Kentucky Derby winner Nyquist descends through the Caro sire line
- Red God, whose modern descendants include 2010 Kentucky Derby winner Animal Kingdom through the Blushing Groom sire line
- Bold Ruler, eight-time leading sire in the United States, whose descendants include Triple Crown winners Secretariat and Seattle Slew. More recently, Seattle Slew has established a successful sire line that has produced several American classic winners including California Chrome
- Never Bend, sire of Mill Reef, whose modern descendants include Sir Percy and Dalakhani

Royal Charger's most important son was Turn-To, whose most important sire sons were Hail to Reason and Sir Gaylord. Hail to Reason's son Halo was the sire of dual classic winner Sunday Silence, who then became the leading sire in Japan from 1995 through 2007. Sunday Silence is the sire of numerous Japanese champions including Deep Impact, and is the grandsire of the top-rated horse of 2014 Just A Way.

Nearctic is principally known as the sire of Northern Dancer, who won the Kentucky Derby and Preakness before becoming one of the dominant sires of the late 20th century. Northern Dancer sired numerable sons who themselves went on to become outstanding sires, principally Nijinsky, Lyphard, Nureyev, Storm Bird, Danzig and Sadler's Wells. The Northern Dancer sire line accounts for hundreds of major winners from around the world, particularly in Europe. His modern descendants include Justify, Galileo, Ouija Board, Sea the Stars, Black Caviar, Frankel and Treve.

Several of Nearco's male-line descendants were ranked among the Top 100 U.S. Racehorses of the 20th Century by The Blood-Horse: #2 Secretariat, #9 Seattle Slew, #10 Spectacular Bid, #18 Cigar, #19 Bold Ruler, #24 Nashua, #31 Sunday Silence, #35 Ruffian, #43 Northern Dancer, #57 Riva Ridge, #58 Slew o' Gold, #69 Noor, #70 Shuvee, #72 Go For Wand, #76 Lady's Secret, #82 Miesque, #85 Lure, #86 Fort Marcy, #90 Davona Dale, #95 Bayakoa and #97 Foolish Pleasure.

Other notable male-line descendants were Ballymoss, Arkle, Never Say Die, Royal Palace, Better Loosen Up, Sir Ivor, Invasor, Wise Dan, and Summer Breeze. Sireline descendants of Nearco include eight of the first nine horses to earn over $10,000,000 in stakes wins. These horses are Deep Impact, Makybe Diva, Narita Brian, Sunline, Symboli Kris S, T M Opera O, Viva Pataca, and Vodka.

According to France Galop, from 1985 through to 2010, every Prix de l'Arc de Triomphe winner can trace a bloodline back to Nearco, through his son Nasrullah and / or his grandson Northern Dancer. Including the influence of the daughters from his sire line, it is increasingly rare to find a Thoroughbred without some trace of Nearco in its pedigree. For example, while 2023 Preakness Stakes winner National Treasure comes from the rival Mr. Prospector sire line, in the fifth generation of National Treasure's pedigree Mr. Prospector's sire Raise a Native appears twice, while Secretariat (great-grandson of Nearco through Nasrullah and Bold Ruler) and Sir Ivor (great-great-grandson through Royal Charger, Turn-To, and Sir Gaylord) both appear twice and Northern Dancer (grandson through Nearctic) appears three times. Nijinsky (a son of Northern Dancer), Red God (a son of Nasrullah), Bold Bidder (a son of Bold Ruler), and Rich Gift (great-grandson of Nearco through Nasrullah and Princely Gift) each appear once. On the distaff side, Mr. Prospector's dam Gold Digger is a great-granddaughter of Nearco through Nasrullah and Nashua, Sweet Tooth a great-granddaughter through Nasrullah and On-and-On, and Fairy Bridge a great-great-great-granddaughter through Royal Charger, Turn-To, Hail to Reason, and Bold Reason(and her dam also has a maternal line to Nearco).

== Pedigree ==
Fairway and Pharos were full brothers by leading sire Phalaris out of the great broodmare Scapa Flow. Fairway was the more successful racehorse, whose wins included the St Leger and Eclipse Stakes, and also initially was the more successful sire, leading the sire list in Great Britain four times. Pharos was a solid racehorse, winning multiple stakes races and finishing second in the Derby. Pharos also proved himself as a sire, leading the British sire list in 1931. Tesio originally wished to breed his mare Nogara to Fairway, but was unable to obtain a nomination so bred her to Pharos instead.

Nearco's dam Nogara was only 15.1 hands (61 inches, 155 cm) but became a champion on the racetrack and then an outstanding broodmare. In addition to Nearco, she produced seven other winners, including Derby Italiano winner Niccolo dell'Arca, Oaks d'Italia winner Nervesa, and stakes winners Nakamuro, Naucide and Niccolo d'Arezzo. Nogara's dam Catnip was a "weedy" foal by Epsom Derby winner Spearmint. Purchased by Tesio at the Newmarket sales for just 75 guineas, Catnip went on to produce multiple stakes winners and stakes producers.

Nearco was inbred 5 x 4 x 4 x 5 to St. Simon, meaning St. Simon appears twice in the fourth generation and twice again in the fifth generation of his pedigree.

Pedigree of Nearco (ITY) Brown horse, foaled 1935
| Sire Pharos (GB) dark bay/brown 1920 | Phalaris brown 1913 | Polymelus | Cyllene |
| Sire Pharos (GB) dark bay/brown 1920 | Phalaris brown 1913 | Polymelus | Maid Marian |
| Sire Pharos (GB) dark bay/brown 1920 | Phalaris brown 1913 | Bromus | Sainfoin |
| Sire Pharos (GB) dark bay/brown 1920 | Phalaris brown 1913 | Bromus | Cheery by St. Simon |
| Sire Pharos (GB) dark bay/brown 1920 | Scapa Flow chestnut 1914 | Chaucer | St. Simon |
| Sire Pharos (GB) dark bay/brown 1920 | Scapa Flow chestnut 1914 | Chaucer | Cantebury Pilgrim |
| Sire Pharos (GB) dark bay/brown 1920 | Scapa Flow chestnut 1914 | Anchora | Love Wisely |
| Sire Pharos (GB) dark bay/brown 1920 | Scapa Flow chestnut 1914 | Anchora | Eryholme |
| Dam Nogara bay 1928 | Havresac II (FR) dark bay/brown 1915 | Rabelais | St. Simon |
| Dam Nogara bay 1928 | Havresac II (FR) dark bay/brown 1915 | Rabelais | Satirical |
| Dam Nogara bay 1928 | Havresac II (FR) dark bay/brown 1915 | Hors Concours (FR) | Ajax |
| Dam Nogara bay 1928 | Havresac II (FR) dark bay/brown 1915 | Hors Concours (FR) | Simona (GB) by St. Simon |
| Dam Nogara bay 1928 | Catnip (IRE) bay 1910 | Spearmint (GB) | Carbine (NZ) |
| Dam Nogara bay 1928 | Catnip (IRE) bay 1910 | Spearmint (GB) | Maid Of The Mint |
| Dam Nogara bay 1928 | Catnip (IRE) bay 1910 | Sibola (USA) | The Sailor Prince (GB) |
| Dam Nogara bay 1928 | Catnip (IRE) bay 1910 | Sibola (USA) | Saluda (family: 4-r) |

== See also ==
- List of leading Thoroughbred racehorses
- List of racehorses
