= Derby Italiano =

- Class: Group 2
- Location: Capannelle Racecourse; Rome, Italy
- Inaugurated: 1884
- Race type: Flat / Thoroughbred
- Website: Capannelle

Race information
- Distance: 2,200 metres (1m 3f)
- Surface: Turf
- Track: Right-handed
- Qualification: Three-year-olds excluding geldings
- Weight: 58 kg Allowances; 1½ kg for fillies
- Purse: €523,800 (2022); 1st: €291,000

The Derby Italiano is a Group 2 flat horse race in Italy open to three-year-old thoroughbred colts and fillies. It is run at Capannelle over a distance of 2,200 metres (about 1 mile and 3 furlongs), and it is scheduled to take place each year in May.

It is Italy's equivalent of The Derby, a famous race in England.

== History ==
The event was established in 1884, and it was originally run in the district of Capannelle over 2,400 metres. It was initially called the Derby Reale, and most of the prize money for the inaugural running was donated by King Umberto I.

The race was transferred to its current venue in 1926. It was known as the Gran Premio del Re in the 1930s, and for a brief period it was titled the Gran Premio del Re Imperatore. It was renamed the Derby Italiano in 1946.

The present system of race grading was introduced in the early 1970s, and the Derby Italiano was initially classed at Group 1 level. It was opened to horses born and bred outside Italy in 1981.

The Derby Italiano was cut to 2,200 metres in 2008, and it was downgraded to Group 2 status in 2009. With a current prize fund of €814,000, it is the most valuable horse race in Italy.

== Records ==
Leading jockey (8 wins):

- Federico Regoli – Gianpietrina (1917), Meissonier (1919), Ghiberti (1920), Michelangelo (1921), Melozzo da Forlì (1922), Cima da Conegliano (1923), Lui (1925), Apelle (1926)

Leading trainer (21 wins):

- Federico Tesio – Guido Reni (1911), Rembrandt (1912), Fausta (1914), Van Dyck (1915), Gianpietrina (1917), Meissonier (1919), Ghiberti (1920), Michelangelo (1921), Melozzo da Forlì (1922), Cima da Conegliano (1923), Apelle (1926), Jacopa del Sellaio (1932), Ugolino da Siena (1935), Donatello II (1937), Nearco (1938), Bellini (1940), Niccolo dell'Arca (1941), Torbido (1944), Tenerani (1947), Daumier (1951), Botticelli (1954)

Leading owner (20 wins): (includes part ownership)

- Federico Tesio – Guido Reni (1911), Rembrandt (1912), Fausta (1914), Van Dyck (1915), Gianpietrina (1917), Meissonier (1919), Ghiberti (1920), Michelangelo (1921), Melozzo da Forlì (1922), Cima da Conegliano (1923), Apelle (1926), Jacopa del Sellaio (1932), Ugolino da Siena (1935), Donatello II (1937), Nearco (1938), Bellini (1940), Niccolo dell'Arca (1941), Tenerani (1947), Daumier (1951), Botticelli (1954)

- The only winner trained but not owned by Federico Tesio was Torbido, owned by his wife Lydia.
- The twenty winners he owned include eleven owned outright, four owned by Tesio-Incisa and five by Razza Dormello-Olgiata.
- Razza Dormello-Olgiata, founded by Tesio, owned seven more winners after his death in 1954.
- Tesio bred twenty-two winners of the race – all of those he trained plus Braque, the winner in 1957.

== Winners since 1980 ==
Year	Winner	Jockey	Trainer	Owner	Time
1980	Garrido	Marcel Depalmas	François Boutin	Razza Dormello-Olgiata	2:30.0
1981	Glint of Gold	John Matthias	Ian Balding	Paul Mellon	2:30.9
1982	Old Country	Pat Eddery	Luca Cumani	Mrs O. Abegg	2:35.8
1983	My Top	Peo Perlanti	Alduino Botti	Scuderia Siba	2:28.6
1984	Welnor	Lester Piggott	Gaetano Benetti	Scuderia Concarena	2:33.9
1985	Don Orazio	Michel Jerome	F. Jovine	Lady M Stable	2:27.9
1986	Tommy Way	Willie Carson	John Dunlop	Scuderia Erasec	2:27.9
1987	Zaizoom	Richard Quinn	Paul Cole	Prince Fahd bin Salman	2:29.1
1988	Tisserand	Vincenzo Mezzatesta	Mario Vincis	Agricola All. La Madia	2:30.6
1989	Prorutori	Michael Roberts	Michael Jarvis	Antonio Balzarini	2:27.5
1990	Houmayoun	Santiago Soto	Alain de Royer-Dupré	Lady M Stable	2:27.0
1991	Hailsham	Steve Cauthen	Clive Brittain	Sheikh Mohammed	2:28.1
1992	In a Tiff	Michael Kinane	Dermot Weld	Michael Smurfit	2:27.5
1993	White Muzzle	John Reid	Peter Chapple-Hyam	Luciano Gaucci	2:24.5
1994	Time Star	Richard Quinn	Paul Cole	Prince Fahd bin Salman	2:28.1
1995	Luso	Michael Kinane	Clive Brittain	Saeed Manana	2:25.7
1996	Bahamian Knight	Richard Hughes	David Loder	Lucayan Stud	2:26.6
1997	Single Empire	David Harrison	Peter Chapple-Hyam	Tony Collins	2:26.2
1998	Central Park	Daragh O'Donohoe	Saeed bin Suroor	Godolphin	2:26.3
1999	Mukhalif	Frankie Dettori	Saeed bin Suroor	Godolphin	2:25.7
2000	Kallisto	Andreas Boschert	Hans Blume	Gestüt Röttgen	2:27.1
2001	Morshdi	Philip Robinson	Michael Jarvis	Ahmed Al Maktoum	2:26.6
2002	Rakti	Mirco Demuro	Bruno Grizzetti	Scuderia Il Poggio	2:27.9
2003	Osorio	Mario Esposito	Urs Suter	Newsells Park Stud	2:27.2
2004	Groom Tesse	Dario Vargiu	Luigi Camici	Scuderia L3C	2:27.6
2005	De Sica	Marco Monteriso	Emilio Borromeo	Emilio Borromeo	2:28.6
2006	Gentlewave	Marco Monteriso	André Fabre	Gary A. Tanaka	2:27.4
2007	Awelmarduk	Edmondo Botti	A. Botti / G. Botti	Scuderia Effevi	2:28.9
2008	Cima de Triomphe	Silvano Mulas	Bruno Grizzetti	Scuderia Cocktail	2:14.6
2009	Mastery	Frankie Dettori	Saeed bin Suroor	Godolphin	2:16.5
2010	Worthadd	Mirco Demuro	Vittorio Caruso	Scuderia Incolinx	2:22.1
2011	Crackerjack King	Fabio Branca	Stefano Botti	Scuderia Effevi	2:15.8
2012	Feuerblitz	Robert Havlin	Michael Figge	Stall Eivissa	2:19.0
2013	Biz the Nurse	Andrea Atzeni	Stefano Botti	Scuderia Aleali	2:17.04
2014	Dylan Mouth	Fabio Branca	Stefano Botti	Scuderia Effevi	2:17.63
2015	Goldstream	Cristian Demuro	Stefano Botti	Scuderia Effevi	2:16.20
2016	Saent^{[a]}	Dario Vargiu	Il Cavallo In Testa	Incolinx	2:14.90
2017	Mac Mahon	Cristian Demuro	Stefano Botti	Takaya Shimakawa	2:16.50
2018	Summer Festival^{[b]}	Cristian Demuro	Alduino Botti	Dioscuri SRL	2:17.10
2019	Keep On Fly^{[c]}	Cristian Demuro	Alduino Botti	Dioscuri SRL	2:22.50
2020	Tuscan Gaze	Carlo Fiocchi	Luciano Bietolini	Mag Horse Racing Srl	2:18.64
2021	Tokyo Gold	Cristian Demuro	Satoshi Kobayashi	Teruya Yoshida	2:14.90
2022	Ardakan	Clement Lecoeuvre	Markus Klug	Darius Racing	2:17.40
2023	Goldena	Dario Di Tocco	Endo Bott	Fabrizio Cameli	2:20.40
2024	Borna	Andrasch Starke	Markus Klug	Darius Racing	2:17.20
2025	Molveno	Marco Ghiani	Marco Botti	Scuderia Sagam Sris	2:14.40
2026	Venetian Prince^{[d]}	Jason Watson	Andrew Balding	J C Smith	2:16.30

^{a} The 2016 winner Saent was later exported to Hong Kong and renamed Super Chic.
^{b} The 2018 winner Summer Festival was later exported to Hong Kong and renamed Party Together.
^{c} The 2019 winner Keep On Fly was later exported to Hong Kong and renamed Generous Charity.
^{d} The 2026 running took place at San Siro.

== Earlier winners ==
- 1884: Andreina
- 1885: Rosenberg
- 1886: Enio
- 1887: Carl Andrea
- 1888: Filiberto
- 1889: Rabicano
- 1890: Doralice
- 1891: Barone
- 1892: Arcadia
- 1893: Festuca
- 1894: Sansonetto
- 1895: Oranzeb
- 1896: Goldoni
- 1897: Hira
- 1898: Simba
- 1899: Elena
- 1900: Cloridano
- 1901: Karibo
- 1902: Tocsin
- 1903: Esquilino
- 1904: The Oak
- 1905: Onorio
- 1906: Creso
- 1907: Belbuc
- 1908: Demetrio
- 1909: Dedalo
- 1910: Saturno
- 1911: Guido Reni
- 1912: Rembrandt
- 1913: Nettuno
- 1914: Fausta
- 1915: Van Dyck
- 1916: Kosheni
- 1917: Gianpietrina
- 1918: Carlone
- 1919: Meissonier
- 1920: Ghiberti
- 1921: Michelangelo
- 1922: Melozzo da Forli
- 1923: Cima da Conegliano
- 1924: Manistee
- 1925: Lui
- 1926: Apelle
- 1927: Senecio
- 1928: Dervio
- 1929: Ortello
- 1930: Emanuele Filiberto
- 1931: Oberon
- 1932: Jacopa del Sellaio
- 1933: Pilade
- 1934: Amur
- 1935: Ugolino da Siena
- 1936: Archidamia
- 1937: Donatello
- 1938: Nearco
- 1939: Vezzano
- 1940: Bellini
- 1941: Niccolo dell'Arca
- 1942: Arco
- 1943: Orsenigo
- 1944: Torbido
- 1945: Traghetto
- 1946: Gladiolo
- 1947: Tenerani
- 1948: Leon de San Marco
- 1949: Golfo
- 1950: Stigliano
- 1951: Daumier
- 1952: Zamoretto
- 1953: Rivisondoli
- 1954: Botticelli
- 1955: Altrek
- 1956: Barba Toni
- 1957: Braque
- 1958: Sedan
- 1959: Rio Martin
- 1960: Fils d'Eve
- 1961: Lauso
- 1962: Antelami
- 1963: Braccio da Montone
- 1964: Diacono
- 1965: Varano
- 1966: Appiani
- 1967: Ruysdael
- 1968: Hogarth
- 1969: Bonconte di Montefeltro
- 1970: Ortis
- 1971: Ardale
- 1972: Gay Lussac
- 1973: Cerreto
- 1974: Suffolk
- 1975: Orange Bay
- 1976: Red Arrow
- 1977: Sirlad
- 1978: Elgay
- 1979: Marracci

The 1916, 1917 and 1925 runnings took place at Parioli, and the 1918, 1944 and 1945 editions were held at Milan.

== See also ==
- List of Italian flat horse races
