= Windsor Lad =

Irish-bred Thoroughbred racehorse

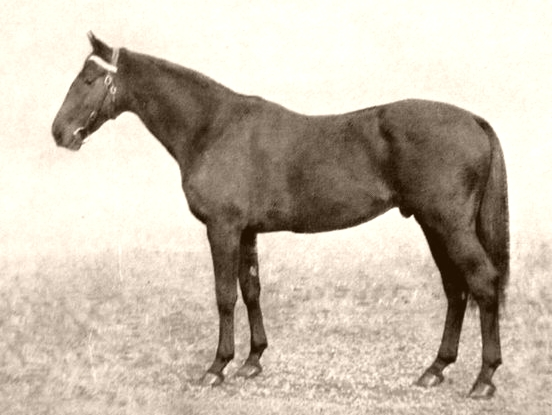
- Sire: Blandford
- Grandsire: Swynford
- Dam: Resplendent
- Damsire: By George!
- Sex: Stallion
- Foaled: 1931
- Country: Ireland
- Colour: Bay
- Breeder: Dan Sullivan
- Owner: Vijayasinhji Chhatrasinhji, Martin H. Benson
- Trainer: Marcus Marsh
- Record: 13: 10-0-1
- Earnings: £36,257

Major wins
- Chester Vase (1934); Epsom Derby (1934); St Leger (1934); Coronation Cup (1935); Eclipse Stakes (1935)

Windsor Lad (1931–1943) was an Irish-bred, British-trained Thoroughbred racehorse. As a three-year-old in 1934, he won both The Derby and the St Leger in record time. In 1935, he won the Coronation Cup and the Eclipse Stakes before his career was ended by injury.

== Background ==
Windsor Lad was sired by the three-time Champion sire Blandford out of the 1926 Epsom Oaks runner-up Resplendent. He was described as "a good, hard bay, level of back, with a well-placed shoulder and broad hips" who possessed a "resolute and calm" temperament.

As a yearling he was sent to the sales by his Irish breeder, Dan Sullivan, where he was sold for 1,300gns to the Indian Maharaja of Rajpipla. Windsor Lad was sent into training with Marcus Marsh at Newmarket, Suffolk and accompanied his trainer when he relocated to Lambourn after the 1933 season. Windsor Lad was ridden in most of his races by Charles "Charlie" Smirke, a controversial figure who was returning after being "warned off" (banned) for five years after he was suspected of "stopping" a horse.

== Racing career ==
=== 1933: two-year-old season ===
Windsor Lad won two races as a juvenile including the Criterion Stakes at Newmarket in October, but was slow to mature and was not among the leaders of his generation.

=== 1934: three-year-old season ===
In 1934, Windsor Lad emerged as a Derby candidate by winning two trial races, the Chester Vase on 8 May and the Newmarket Stakes. In The Derby he started at 15/2 joint second favourite, in a field of nineteen, with the undefeated 2000 Guineas winner Colombo starting favourite. The race was run of fast ground in front of a crowd estimated at between 300,000 and 500,000. Ridden by Charlie Smirke, Windsor Lad was second turning into the straight before taking the lead a furlong out. He was strongly challenged by Easton and Colombo but ran on strongly to win by a length and a neck. The winning time of 2:34.0 equalled the race record set by Hyperion the previous year. The Maharaja celebrated with a lavish party at the Savoy Hotel which featured a performing elephant arrayed in his purple and cream racing colours.

Windsor Lad started favourite for his first race against older horses in the Eclipse Stakes at Sandown in July. Smirke held the colt up but became "jammed against the rail" in the straight. By the time he had extricated the Derby winner, the race was effectively over and although Windsor Lad finished strongly he finished only third, beaten half a length and the same by the four-year-olds King Salmon and Umidwar.

During the summer of 1934, there were proposals for special international race at either Saratoga Springs or Belmont Park between Windsor Lad, the American champion Cavalcade and the leading French colt Admiral Drake (Brantôme, probably the best three-year-old of 1934 was a sick horse during the summer) but the plans did not come to fruition.

After the Eclipse Stakes, Windsor Lad was sold for a sum of £50,000 to the bookmaker Martin H. Benson. Windsor Lad won the Great Yorkshire Stakes and in the St Leger at Doncaster the colt returned to his best form. He started at odds of 4/9 with the connections of his rivals conceding that they had little prospect of upsetting the favourite. In front of a crowd estimated at a quarter of a million, Smirke tracked the leader before moving the colt in to the lead three furlongs from the finish. Windsor Lad was never challenged and won going away by two lengths from Tiberius in a record-equalling time of 3:01.6. As of 2012, the record remains unsurpassed. After the race he was described as "one of the finest horses the English turf has seen in many seasons."

=== 1935: four-year-old season ===
Windsor Lad was unbeaten as a four-year-old. After winning the Burwell Stakes he faced Easton in the Coronation Cup at Epsom. The race was much anticipated, and was seen as being a match between Easton's speed and Windsor Lad's stamina. Windsor Lad prevailed in the race, beating Easton by a length and a half.

He won the Rous Memorial Stakes over 7 1/2 furlongs at Royal Ascot and was then sent to Sandown for a second attempt at the Eclipse Stakes. In the Eclipse he started at odds of 4/7 and led from the start to win by three quarters of a length from Theft and Fair Trial. He broke down during the race and won what had already been announced as his last racecourse appearance despite sustaining an injury.

== Assessment ==
In their book A Century of Champions, John Randall and Tony Morris rated Windsor Lad the nineteenth best horse of the 20th century and the sixth best Derby winner, behind Sea Bird, Hyperion, Mill Reef, Nijinsky and Shergar.

== Stud career ==
Windsor Lad suffered from ill health during his stud career and made little impact as a stallion. He developed severe sinus trouble and was put down on 14 December 1943. His most notable offspring was the Irish Triple Crown winner Windsor Slipper.

== Sire line tree ==
- Windsor Lad
  - King Hal
    - Mill House
  - Bakhtawar
  - Windsor Slipper
    - Dublin Town
    - Lucky Bag
      - Monte Carlo
    - Royal Barge
    - Jai Mahal
    - Solar Slipper
      - Cloonroughan
      - Panaslipper
        - Hot Brandy
        - London Gazette
          - Quayside
            - Omerta
        - Reubens
      - State Trumpeter
      - Black Patch
      - Three Wells
      - Little Buskins
      - Pandofell
        - Piaco
      - Solstice
    - The Cobbler
      - Hans Sachs
      - Gay Cobbler
    - Castleton
    - Windsor Serial
  - Happy Landing

== Pedigree ==
Pedigree of Windsor Lad (GB), bay stallion, 1931
Sire Blandford (IRE) 1919	Swynford; 1907	John O'Gaunt	Isinglass
Sire Blandford (IRE) 1919	Swynford; 1907	John O'Gaunt	La Fleche
Sire Blandford (IRE) 1919	Swynford; 1907	Canterbury Pilgrim	Tristan
Sire Blandford (IRE) 1919	Swynford; 1907	Canterbury Pilgrim	Pilgrimage
Sire Blandford (IRE) 1919	Blanche; 1912	White Eagle	Gallinule
Sire Blandford (IRE) 1919	Blanche; 1912	White Eagle	Merry Gal
Sire Blandford (IRE) 1919	Blanche; 1912	Black Cherry	Bendigo
Sire Blandford (IRE) 1919	Blanche; 1912	Black Cherry	Black Duchess
Dam Resplendent (GB) 1923	By George; 1911	Lally	Amphion
Dam Resplendent (GB) 1923	By George; 1911	Lally	Miss Hoyden
Dam Resplendent (GB) 1923	By George; 1911	Queens Holiday	Royal Hampton
Dam Resplendent (GB) 1923	By George; 1911	Queens Holiday	Cimiez
Dam Resplendent (GB) 1923	Sunbridge; 1914	Bridge of Earn	Cyllene
Dam Resplendent (GB) 1923	Sunbridge; 1914	Bridge of Earn	Santa Brigida
Dam Resplendent (GB) 1923	Sunbridge; 1914	Sunshot	Carbine
Dam Resplendent (GB) 1923	Sunbridge; 1914	Sunshot	Stream of Gold (Family: 19)
