= Marcus Marsh =

British horse trainer

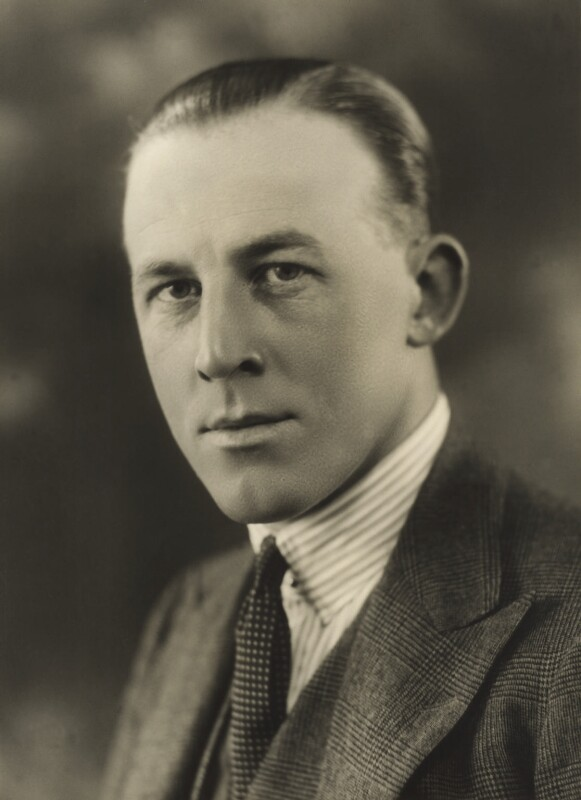
- Marsh in 1931

Personal information
- Born: 1904 United Kingdom
- Died: 1983 (aged 78–79)
- Occupation: Trainer

Horse racing career
- Sport: Horse racing

Major racing wins
- British Classic Race wins as trainer: 2000 Guineas (1); Epsom Derby (2); St Leger (2)

Racing awards
- British flat racing Champion Trainer (1952)

Significant horses
- Windsor Lad, The Bug, Palestine, Tulyar

Marcus Maskell Marsh (1904–1983) was an English racehorse trainer. He was the son of the trainer Richard Marsh. His British Classic wins included The Derby and St. Leger with Tulyar (1952) and Windsor Lad (1934) as well as the 2,000 Guineas with Palestine (1950). He was British flat racing Champion Trainer in 1952.

Marsh's career spanned over forty years until his retirement in 1964 with a break during World War II when he served in the RAF.

On 28 September 1936 he married tennis player Eileen Bennett. In 1968 Marsh published his autobiography, Racing with the Gods.
