= Martin H. Benson =

Martin Benson (1879–1972) was the co-founder of Douglas Stewart, one of the largest bookmakers in London, and also the owner of Beech House Stud, a Thoroughbred racehorse breeding farm located on Cheveley Road near Newmarket, Suffolk.

== Early years ==
Benson was born as Henry Phillips Gottschalk in Islington on 24 August 1879. His father Siegfried Gottschalk, was an immigrant from Germany, his mother, Charlotte Phillips, was from Manchester. Although he grew up in East London, by the age of 22 he was working as an electrician in West London. Two years later he married an Irish woman named Marie Cruise, and in 1906 he changed his name to "Martin Harry Benson". Martin had become a successful bookmaker by 1911. Having co-founded the bookies "Douglas Stewart" he later branched out into race horse breeding.

== Career and personal life ==
In 1929 The New York Times ran an article about Martin Benson's scandalous divorce from his first wife. Benson filed his petition under his birth name, giving his wife's name as Marie Cruise Gottschalk. The New York Times wrote that the case "had thus far escaped notice because of the names used in the proceedings." During the proceedings, Benson claimed a ten-year residence In Rhode Island although he appears in the Street Directories for Epsom, London from 1915 to 1922 at Highfield, Burgh Heath Road under his alias 'Douglas Stuart'.

Benson bought Beech House Stud from Charles Hackford in 1930. He went on to develop Beech House Stud into a major breeding operation. In 1934 he purchased the thoroughbred Windsor Lad for £50,000 from the Maharaja of Rajpipla "Pip", after it won the Eclipse Stakes. The horse went on to win the Great Yorkshire Stakes and the St Leger at Doncaster. Windsor Lad also won the Coronation Cup (1935) and the Eclipse Stakes (1935).

Benson purchased the unbeaten Italian-bred Nearco from owner/breeder Federico Tesio for £60,000 in 1938. The Leading sire in Great Britain & Ireland in 1947 and 1949, and one of the most important sires of the 20th century, Nearco's enduring legacy stems primarily from three of his sons: Nasrullah, Royal Charger, and Nearctic who sired Northern Dancer.

In 1949 The New York Times published an article in which Benson, described as "One of London's biggest bookmakers", tips Winston Churchill as a 6-to-4 favourite to be the next prime minister of Britain. They wrote: "He said that he had set the prices for the purpose of doing business and that his personal politics had nothing to do with the odds."

== In popular culture ==
A poem known as "a happy vicar" by George Orwell refers to Douglas Stewart's tagline "Dougie never owes". In a lamentation of the ills of the age Orwell writes:-

"And the commissar is telling my fortune While the radio plays, But the priest has promised an Austin Seven, For Duggie always pays."

Benson was also mentioned in a Great War Diary of a lance corporal in the Public Schools' Brigade: -

"We soon moved to Epsom where I and two privates were billeted on Duggie Stuart, the bookie; I forget his real name. We spoke too enthusiastically about the comfort of this billet and the welcoming whiskey soda in the evening. It was declared to be our company officers' billet and we were thrown out."
