= Federico Tesio =

Italian politician (1869–1954)

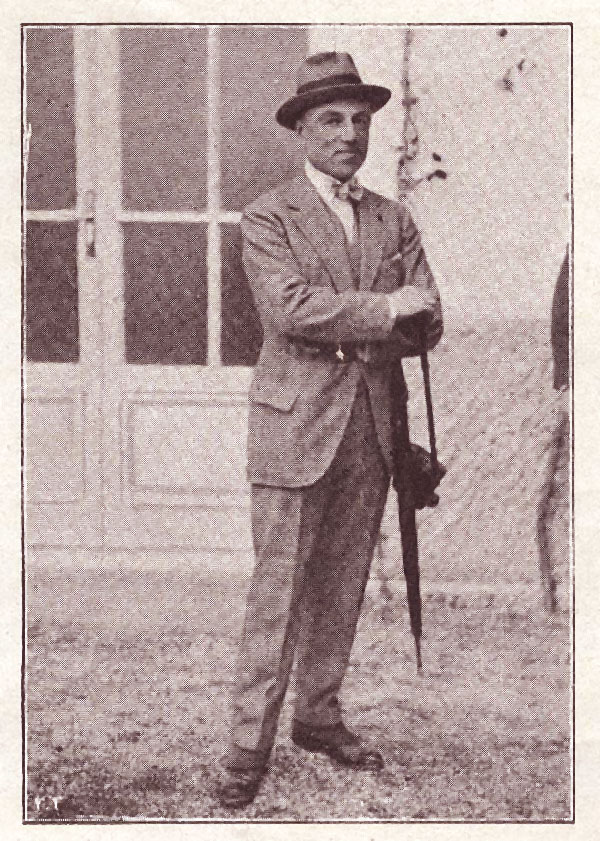
- Tesio in 1921
- Born: 17 January 1869; Turin, Italy
- Died: 1 May 1954 (aged 85); Milan, Italy
- Occupations: Farmer, Racehorse breeder, owner and trainer.

Federico Tesio (17 January 1869 – 1 May 1954) was an Italian breeder of Thoroughbreds for horse racing. He has been called "the only genius ever to operate in the breeding world" and "the greatest single figure in the history of Italian racing".

Born in Turin, orphaned at 6 years of age, Federico Tesio obtained a degree from the University of Florence. He served in the Italian Army during World War I and in 1939 was appointed to the Italian Senate.

In 1898, he and his wife Lydia Tesio purchased a silk worm farm complete with thousands of Mulberry trees. These were removed and a guest residence, stallion stalls and stallion master's house were established on the Dormello Stud's 19 hectares of today in Dormelletto, Novara on the banks of Lake Maggiore in northern Italy. This has always been where mares with foals and Stallions of the day reside.

By the 1930s the complex of stables attributable to Villa Tesio, the largest in Italy, included, within it, several farms in the municipal area that - over time - were established by Tesio: those of "Surga", the "Montaccio", the "Route", the "Moretta", the "Cucchetta", the "Torbera", the "Motta", each complete with a manager's house, stables and necessary stabling. One was for pregnant mares, one for barren mares, one for yearlings, one with a nearby huge dirt track within the treed forest in a flat over the top of the mount for horses in training and so on. These farms were all part of a stretch of land which took in most of the Dormelletto of today. The Tesio property stretched from the flats of the lake about 4 km to the west and up the mounts of about 1500 metres and spread to the South for about 1.5 km. The successor to Tesio's property, The Marchese Niccolo Incisa della Rochetta, has sold off much of the original estate, but, for example, still owns several of the farms established by Tesio and an occupied two storey house directly behind the Dormelletto railway station, only 150 metres from the lake, but 1.5 km from the main villa.

Tesio is given credit for the breeding successes of his farm, while his wife is identified as playing an important role in the social and business aspects of the operation, being responsible for bringing in Marchese Mario Incisa Della Rochetta as his partner in 1932. She kept the records of the stud until 1942. An owner/breeder who also always trained his own horses, Tesio's horses have influenced the breeding of the Thoroughbred internationally. He bred several champions including Nearco, Ribot, Braque and Cavaliere d’Arpino, whom he considered the best horse that he ever bred Cavaliere d'Arpino sired Bellini the sire of Tenerani which in turn was the sire of Ribot, who won the Prix de l'Arc de Triomphe twice. Nearco sired Nearctic, sire of Northern Dancer. Donatello II won the Prix du Jockey Club but in his only defeat for Tesio, the jockey was instructed to take the lead, and lost. Donatello then immediately went to stud in the UK. Tesio bred, owned and trained 22 winners of the Derby Italiano.

In 1947, Ulrico Hoepli of Milano published a book by Federico Tesio which he had titled Puro-Sangue - Animale da Esperimento. In 1958 a book was published titled "Breeding the Racehorse" accredited to Tesio and as having been edited and translated by Edward Spinola. In 2005 an English translation of the original Tesio Puro-Sangue - Animale da Esperimento translated by Maria Burnett was published by Russell Meerdink Co. Ltd (ISBN 978-0929346762) and was titled Tesio: In His Own Words.

The Federico Tesio Stakes at Pimlico Race Course in Baltimore, Maryland is named in his honor. The Premio Lydia Tesio race at the Capannelle Racecourse in Rome is named for his wife and the Premio Federico Tesio for him at San Siro Racecourse in Milan and also the registered Group 3 Australian race Tesio Stakes in Melbourne.

He died in 1954, shortly before the debut of Ribot, a horse who has been described as his "masterpiece". In 1999, nearly half a century after his death, he was named at number 18 in the Racing Post's list of 100 Makers of 20th Century Racing.
