= Arnull =

Arnull is a surname. Notable people with the surname include:

- Bill Arnull (1785–1835), British jockey, son of John and nephew of Sam
- John Arnull (1753–1815), British flat racing jockey
- Sam Arnull (c. 1760–1800), British flat racing jockey
- Antony Arnull (unknown), British legal scholar
