= Bill Arnull =

British jockey

Personal information
- Born: 1785
- Died: 1835 (aged 49–50)
- Occupation: Jockey

Horse racing career
- Sport: Horse racing

Major racing wins
- British Classic Race wins as jockey: 1,000 Guineas (1817, 1829, 1832); 2,000 Guineas (1814, 1815, 1816); Epsom Derby (1804, 1812, 1814)

Significant horses
- Blucher, Galata, Hannibal, Octavius

William Arnull was a British jockey. He was from a famous family of jockeys, being the son of John Arnull and nephew of Sam Arnull. Arnull was known to many as the best of the three.

== Career ==
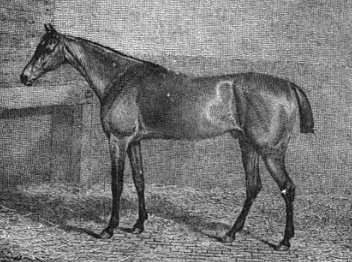
Blucher (Arnull's 1814 Derby winner) in an engraving of 1816 after a painting by James Barenger

He was apprenticed to Frank Neal in Newmarket but his first flush of success came riding for his brother-in-law, Richard Boyce, whose major owners were Messrs Ladbroke and Shakespeare. For Ladbroke, he won the 1812 Derby on Octavius. He also won the 1804 Derby on Hannibal for Lord Egremont and the 1814 renewal on Blucher for Lord Stawell. He won three successive 2,000 Guineas between 1814 and 1816, and won the fillies' Guineas three times between 1817 and 1832. By this time in his career, his principal patrons were Lord George Cavendish and the Marquess of Exeter

== Riding style and personality ==
It is said of Arnull that "lack of tactical skill prevented him from being a great jockey." Nevertheless, he was a "fearless rider, whose strength made him formidable in a finish, and absolutely honest." He was known for being careful with his money and it was said he would go for a week without food if it would earn him a sovereign. This led Newmarket locals to encourage tramps to target him with their begging. He never became rich as a jockey, and was still riding aged 48.

He suffered from gout from an early age and it finally killed him on 29 April 1835, just after he had started training for Lord Lichfield.

== Major wins ==
=== Classic races ===
(United Kingdom) Great Britain

- 1,000 Guineas – (3) – Neva (1817), Young Mouse (1829), Galata (1832)
- 2,000 Guineas – (3) – Olive (1814), Tigris (1815), Nectar (1816)
- Epsom Derby – (3) – Hannibal (1804), Octavius (1812), Blucher (1814)

=== Selected other races ===
- Ascot Gold Cup – (3) – Bizarre (1824, 1825), Galata (1833)

== Bibliography ==
- Mortimer, Roger; Onslow, Richard; Willett, Peter (1978). Biographical Encyclopaedia of British Racing. London: Macdonald and Jane's. ISBN 0-354-08536-0.
- Tanner, Michael; Cranham, Gerry (1992). Great Jockeys of the Flat. Enfield, Middlesex: Guinness Publishing. ISBN 0-85112-989-7.
