= John Arnull =

Personal information
- Born: 1753
- Died: 1815 (aged 61–62)
- Occupation: Jockey

Horse racing career
- Sport: Horse racing

Major racing wins
- Major races Epsom Derby (1784, 1790, 1796, 1799, 1807); Epsom Oaks (1796)

Significant horses
- Archduke, Didelot, Election, Parisot, Rhadamanthus, Serjeant

John Arnull (1753-1815) was an English flat racing jockey. He was the first man to ride five Epsom Derby winners and a member of the dominant race riding family in England in the late 18th and early 19th Centuries.

== Career ==
Arnull was jockey to the Prince of Wales and notorious gambler Dennis O'Kelly on whose horse, Serjeant, he won the fifth running of the Derby in 1784. His younger brother, Sam, had won the inaugural running of the race on board Diomed and his son William would win three Derbies. In 1796, in his forties, he became the second jockey (after Sam Chifney) to win the Derby-Oaks double, winning the former on Didelot and latter on Parisot for Sir Frank Standish. A few years later, he would win another Derby for Standish – the 1799 running on Archduke. His other successes came in the 1790 race on Rhadamanthus for Lord Grosvenor and the 1807 race, when in his fifties, on Election for Lord Egremont.

The extent of the Arnulls' reputation was such that "Newmarket [the home of British racing] without an Arnull would ... have seemed strange". They also had a reputation for being more trustworthy than some of their contemporaries. John was noted for his hardy constitution in the face of the extreme wasting that jockeys undergo to achieve a race-riding weight. In order to ride one horse for the Prince of Wales, he went eight days eating nothing but apples and "was not injured by it". He died aged 62.

== Major wins ==
(United Kingdom) Great Britain

- Epsom Derby – (5) – Serjeant (1784), Rhadamanthus (1790), Didelot (1796), Archduke (1799), Election (1807)
- Epsom Oaks – Parisot (1796)

== See also ==
- List of significant families in British horse racing

== Bibliography ==
- Mortimer, Roger; Onslow, Richard; Willett, Peter (1978). Biographical Encyclopaedia of British Racing. London: Macdonald and Jane's. ISBN 0-354-08536-0.
- Nimrod [pseud.] (1850). The chace, the turf and the road. London: J. Murray. p. 114.
- Tanner, Michael; Cranham, Gerry (1992). Great Jockeys of the Flat. Enfield, Middlesex: Guinness Publishing. ISBN 0-85112-989-7.
- Wright, Howard (1986). The Encyclopaedia of Flat Racing. London: Robert Hale. ISBN 0-7090-2639-0.
