= Epsom Derby =

Flat Classic horse race in Britain

Derby Stakes
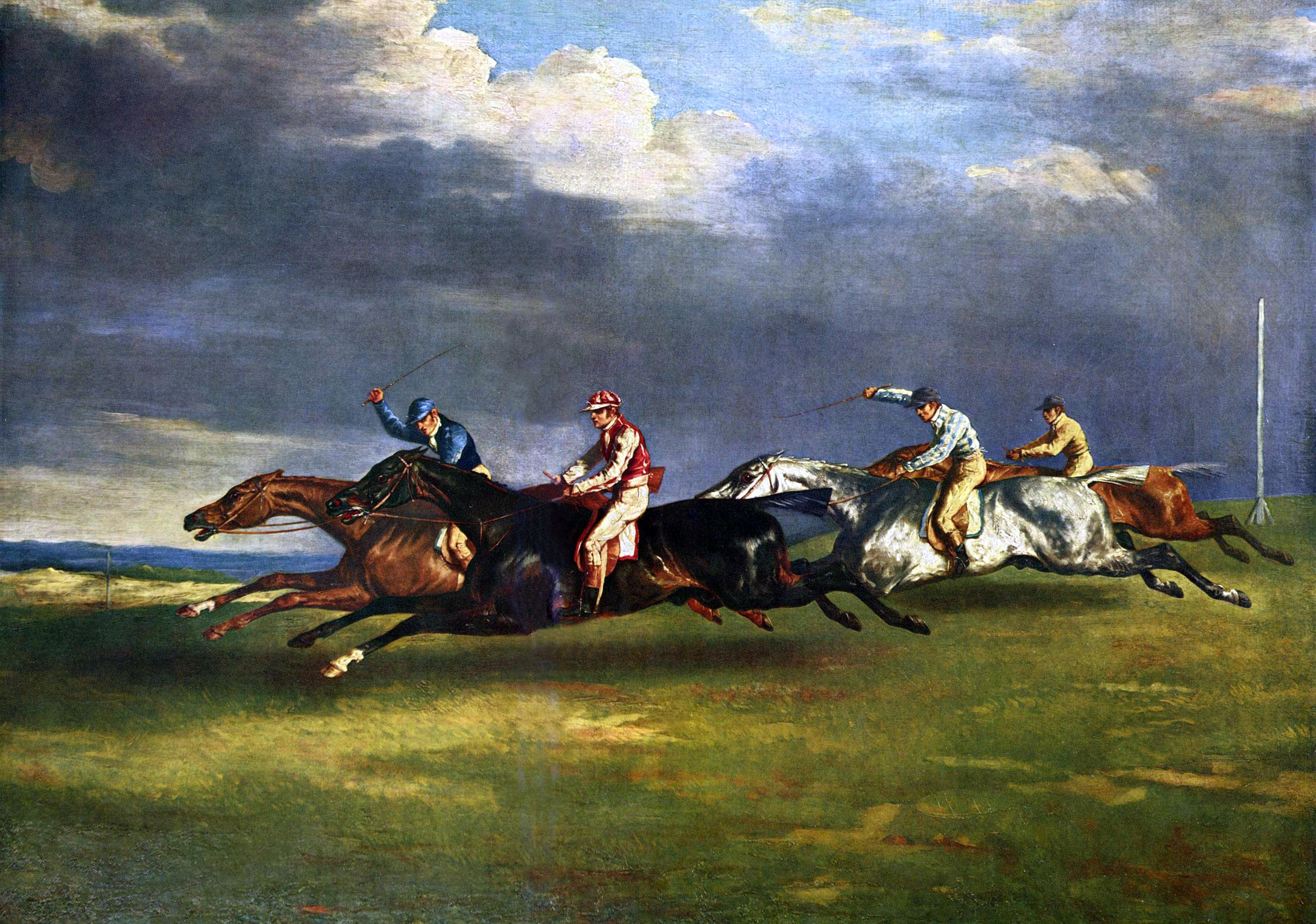
- The 1821 Derby at Epsom by Théodore Géricault (1791–1824)
- Class: Group 1
- Location: Epsom Downs; Epsom, Surrey, England
- Inaugurated: 1780
- Race type: Flat / Thoroughbred
- Sponsor: Betfred
- Website: Epsom Derby

Race information
- Distance: 1m 4f 6y (2,419m), or about 1½ miles
- Surface: Turf
- Track: Left-handed
- Qualification: Three-year-olds excluding geldings
- Weight: 9 st 2 lb Allowances; 3 lb for fillies
- Purse: £1,500,000 (2025) £2,000,000 (2026); 1st: £909,628

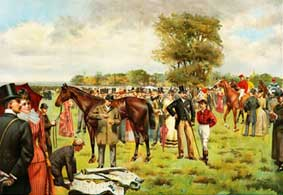
Derby, the Paddock (1892)

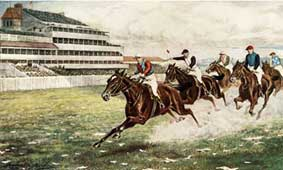
Isinglass wins the Derby (1893)

The Derby, more commonly known as the Derby and sometimes referred to as the Epsom Derby, is a Group 1 flat horse race in England open to three-year-old colts and fillies. It is run at Epsom Downs Racecourse in Surrey on the first Saturday of June each year, over a distance of one mile, four furlongs and 10 yards (2,423 metres) or about 1½ miles. It was first run in 1780.

It is Britain's joint richest flat horse race and the most prestigious of the five Classics. It is sometimes referred to as the "Blue Riband" of the turf. The race serves as the middle leg of the historically significant Triple Crown of British horse racing, preceded by the 2000 Guineas and followed by the St Leger, although the feat of winning all three is rarely attempted in the modern era due to changing priorities in racing and breeding, and the demands it places on horses.

The name "Derby" (deriving from the sponsorship of the Earl of Derby) has been borrowed many times, notably by the Kentucky Derby in the United States, and to describe many other key racing and sporting events. The term "Epsom Derby" is often used in the United States and elsewhere, in order to differentiate the Derby from other races such as the Irish Derby or French Derby. The Derby run at Epsom is usually referred to as "the Derby" in Great Britain. It is one of Britain's great national sporting events and has a large worldwide TV audience.

== History ==
The Stanley family, Earls of Derby, had a long history of horse-racing, and James Stanley, 7th Earl of Derby, who gained the Lordship of Mann in 1627, instituted horse-racing on the Langness Peninsula on the Isle of Man, donating a cup for what became known as the "Manx Derby".

The Derby originated at a celebration following the first running of the Oaks Stakes in 1779. A new race was planned, and it was decided that it should be named after either the host of the party, the 12th Earl of Derby, or one of his guests, Sir Charles Bunbury (the Bunbury Cup run at Newmarket would later be named in his honour). According to legend the decision was made by the toss of a coin, but it is probable that Bunbury, the Steward of the Jockey Club, deferred to his host. The inaugural running of the Derby was held on Thursday 4 May 1780. It was won by Diomed, a colt owned by Sir Charles Bunbury, who collected prize money of £1,065 15s. The first four runnings were contested over the last mile of the old Orbicular course, and this was extended in line with the Oaks to the current distance of 1½ miles in 1784. Lord Derby achieved his first success in the event in 1787, with a horse called Sir Peter Teazle. The 1897 race, which was called the Jubilee Derby in honour of the Diamond Jubilee of Queen Victoria, was won easily by Galtee More, causing bonfire celebrations all over Ireland.

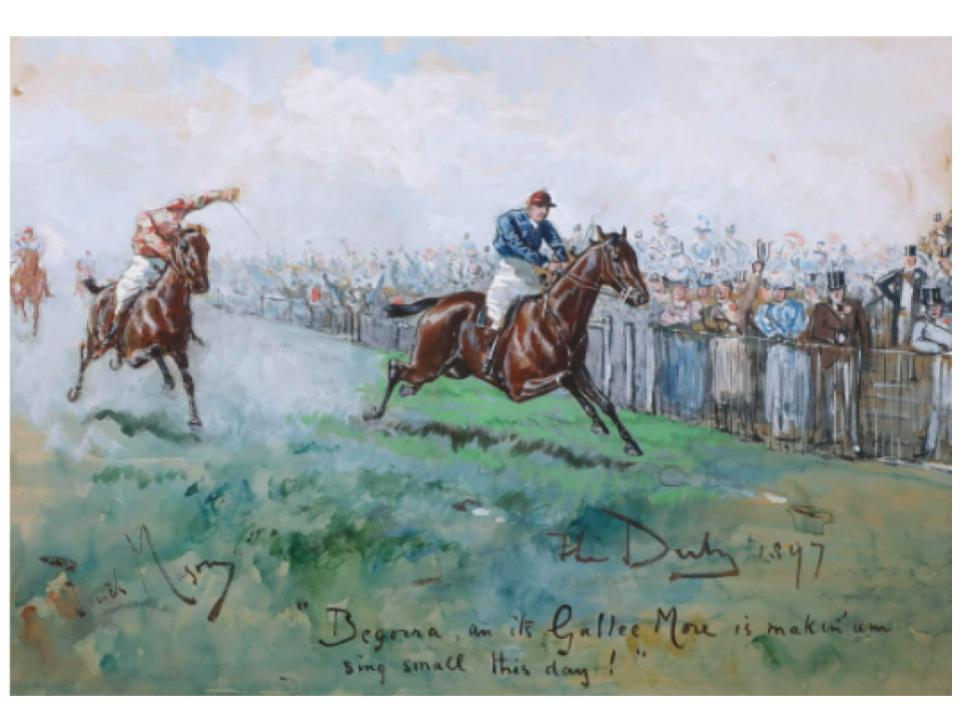
Galtee More easily wins the "Jubilee" Derby on 2 June 1897

The starting point of the race was moved twice during the 19th century. The first move, suggested by Lord George Bentinck, was in 1848, and the second was in 1872. It was discovered in 1991 that the exact length of the race was one mile, four furlongs and 10 yards.

Initially, the Derby was run on a Thursday in late May or early June, depending on when Easter occurred. In 1838 the race was moved to a Wednesday to fit in with the railways' timetables, but still followed the moveable feast of Easter. The North London Railway's Secretary, 14 April 1863, reported its arrangements for the conveyance of passengers for Epsom races on 16th & 17th. In the 20th century, the race was run mainly on a Wednesday in late May or early June until 1994, after which it was changed to a Saturday in early June. From 1915 to 1918 (during World War I), it was on a Tuesday, with the race's latest ever date being 31 July 1917. From 1942 to 1945 (during World War II), 1947 to 1950, and in 1953, the race was run on a Saturday. From 1969 to 1994, it was on the first Wednesday in June. From 2003 to at least 2022, it has been on the first Saturday in June, apart from a race on 4 July 2020 without spectators, owing to COVID-19.

The Derby has been run at Epsom in all years except during the world wars; from 1915 to 1918 and from 1940 to 1945, the Derby was run at Newmarket as the 'New Derby'.

With the race's close association with gambling, the most controversial running of the Epsom Derby took place in 1844. The winner, Running Rein, was disqualified on discovery that a four-year-old imposter, a horse by the name Maccabeus, had been substituted in his place as part of a betting coup.

The Derby has inspired many similar events around the world. European variations include the Irish Derby, the Prix du Jockey Club (often known as the "French Derby"), Derby Italiano and the Deutsches Derby. Several races in the United States include the "Derby" name, including the oldest, the Kentucky Derby. Other national equivalents include the Australian Derby, the New Zealand Derby, the Japanese Derby and the Romanian Derby.

The BBC made the first radio commentary broadcast of the Derby on 1 June 1927.

In 1931, the Derby became the world's first outdoor sporting event to be televised.

There is a maximum of 20 runners allowed in the race.

Since 1993, the Derby has introduced the option of yearling entry.

In 2025, The Jockey Club, who own and operate Epsom Downs Racecourse, announced a number of significant changes to the 2026 Betfred Derby Festival, both on and off the track.

As part of a project to reinvigorate the world's most famous race, these enhancements included an increase to prize money, customer experience improvements and alterations to the race programme.

== Epsom Fair ==
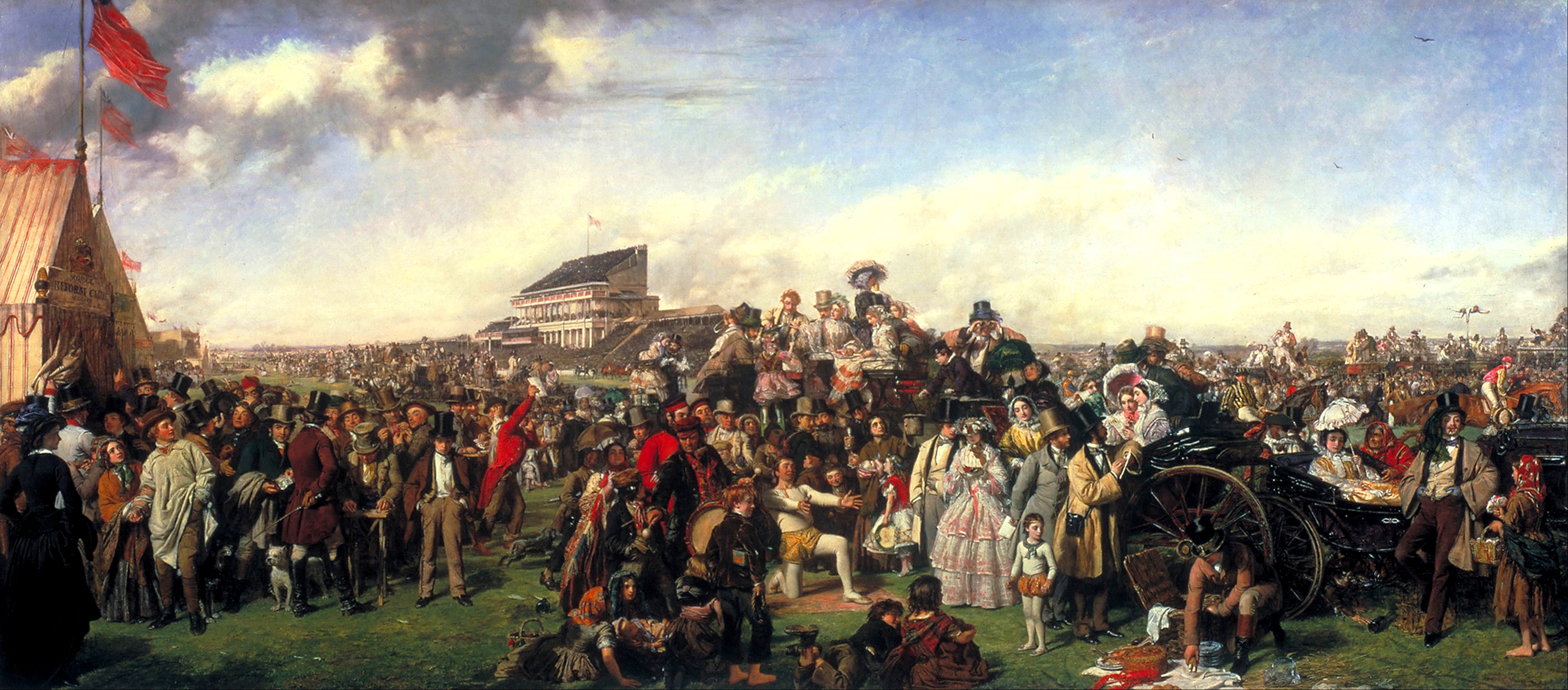
The Derby Day by William Powell Frith (1858)

For many years the Derby was run on a Wednesday or a Thursday and on the day huge crowds would come from London, not only to see the race but to enjoy other entertainment (during some of the 19th century and most of the 20th, Parliament would adjourn to allow members to attend the meeting).

By the time that Charles Dickens visited Epsom Downs to view the race in the 1850s, entertainers such as musicians, clowns, and conjurers plied their trades and entertained the crowds; other forms of entertainment included coconut stalls. The crowded meeting was the subject of a painting by William Powell Frith painted in the 1858 and titled The Derby Day; critics have noted that the foreground of the painting features the entertainment attractions, while the racing is relegated to the margins.

In the 1870s, the steam-driven rides were introduced. They were located at the Tattenham Corner end of the grounds and the fair was on for ten days and entertained hundreds of thousands. During the latter half of the 20th century, Derby Day became less popular and the race was moved from Wednesday to Saturday in 1995 with the hope of reviving high attendance. As the number of people attending the fair dwindled in the face of competition for attention and changing tastes, its length was reduced from 10 days to three or four.

=== Modern format ===
Today, the free-admission Hill still provides a festival atmosphere with a fairground in operation on the Friday and Saturday. The walk-in nature of the Hill typically sees Derby attendances exceed 100,000 spectators, making it one of the largest sporting events in the United Kingdom.

In 2026, Queensberry, owned by Frank Warren, took over a section of The Hill, providing free entertainment and activities.

== Sponsorship ==
In 2021 and 2022 the race, along with seven other races at the Derby festival, was sponsored by Cazoo. In April 2023, the bookmaker Betfred agreed a three-year deal to sponsor the Derby and Oaks.

Investec was the previous sponsor of the Derby between 2009 and 2020. The race was previously backed by Ever Ready (1984–94) and Vodafone (1995–2008).

== Popular culture ==
- The 1952 drama film Derby Day, directed by Herbert Wilcox and starring Michael Wilding and Anna Neagle, is set entirely around the Derby.
- Other films which centre on the Derby are Wings of the Morning, notably, the first British technicolor film; The March Hare; and the most accurate of the quartet Esther Waters, directed by Ian Dalrymple and starring Kathleen Ryan and Dirk Bogarde, this dramatically set around the Derbys of 1881 and 1885.
- Howard Brenton's 1997 play Epsom Downs is set on Derby Day 1977.
- The Derby is also the setting for the series 2 finale of BBC television's Peaky Blinders.
- The Derby race features as a plot in a stage show in the film Yankee Doodle Dandy.
- A mid-19th century Derby race is the background of a 2007 crime novel, The Iron Horse, by Edward Marston.

Epsom Derby
2026
Christmas Day	Maltese Cross	James J Braddock

Previous years
2025
Lambourn	Lazy Griff	Tennessee Stud
2024
City of Troy	Ambiente Friendly	Los Angeles
2023
Auguste Rodin	King of Steel	White Birch
2022
Desert Crown	Hoo Ya Mal	Westover
2021
Adayar	Mojo Star	Hurricane Lane

2020-2011
2020
Serpentine	Khalifa Sat	Amhran Na Bhfiann
2019
Anthony Van Dyck	Madhmoon	Japan
2018
Masar	Dee Ex Bee	Roaring Lion
2017
Wings of Eagles	Cliffs of Moher	Cracksman
2016
Harzand	US Army Ranger	Idaho
2015
Golden Horn	Jack Hobbs	Storm The Stars
2014
Australia	Kingston Hill	Romsdal
2013
Ruler of the World	Libertarian	Galileo Rock
2012
Camelot	Main Sequence	Astrology
2011
Pour Moi	Treasure Beach	Carlton House

2010-2001
2010
Workforce	At First Sight	Rewilding
2009
Sea The Stars	Fame And Glory	Masterofthehorse
2008
New Approach	Tartan Bearer	Casual Conquest
2007
Authorized	Eagle Mountain	Aqaleem
2006
Sir Percy	Dragon Dancer	Dylan Thomas
2005
Motivator	Walk in the Park	Dubawi
2004
North Light	Rule of Law	Let The Lion Roar
2003
Kris Kin	The Great Gatsby	Alamshar
2002
High Chaparral	Hawk Wing	Moon Ballad
2001
Galileo	Golan	Tobougg

2000-1991
2000
Sinndar	Sakhee	Beat Hollow
1999
Oath	Daliapour	Beat All
1998
High-Rise	City Honours	Border Arrow
1997
Benny The Dip	Silver Patriarch	Romanov
1996
Shaamit	Dushyantor	Shantou
1995
Lammtarra	Tamure	Presenting
1994
Erhaab	King's Theatre	Colonel Collins
1993
Commander in Chief	Blue Judge	Blues Traveller
1992
Dr Devious	St Jovite	Silver Wisp
1991
Generous	Marju	Star of Gdansk

1990-1981
1990
Quest For Fame	Blue Stag	Elmaamul
1989
Nashwan	Terimon	Cacoethes
1988
Kahyasi	Glacial Storm	Doyoun
1987
Reference Point	Most Welcome	Bellotto
1986
Shahrastani	Dancing Brave	Mashkour
1985
Slip Anchor	Law Society	Damister
1984
Secreto	El Gran Senor	Mighty Flutter
1983
Teenoso	Carlingford Castle	Shearwalk
1982
Golden Fleece	Touching Wood	Silver Hawk
1981
Shergar	Glint of Gold	Scintillating Air

1980-1971
1980
Henbit	Master Willie	Rankin
1979
Troy	Dickens Hill	Northern Baby
1978
Shirley Heights	Hawaiian Sound	Remainder Man
1977
The Minstrel	Hot Grove	Blushing Groom
1976
Empery	Relkino	Oats
1975
Grundy	Nobiliary	Hunza Dancer
1974
Snow Knight	Imperial Prince	Giacometti
1973
Morston	Cavo Doro	Freefoot
1972
Roberto	Rheingold	Pentland Firth
1971
Mill Reef	Linden Tree	Irish Ball

1970-1961
1970
Nijinsky	Gyr	Stintino
1969
Blakeney	Shoemaker	Prince Regent
1968
Sir Ivor	Connaught	Mount Athos
1967
Royal Palace	Ribocco	Dart Board
1966
Charlottown	Pretendre	Black Prince II
1965
Sea Bird	Meadow Court	I Say
1964
Santa Claus	Indiana	Dilettante
1963
Relko	Merchant Venturer	Ragusa
1962
Larkspur	Arcor	Le Cantilien
1961
Psidium	Dicta Drake	Pardao

1960-1951
1960
St Paddy	Alcaeus	Kythnos
1959
Parthia	Fidalgo	Shantung
1958
Hard Ridden	Paddy's Point	Nagami
1957
Crepello	Ballymoss	Pipe of Peace
1956
Lavandin	Montaval	Roistar
1955
Phil Drake	Panaslipper	Acropolis
1954
Never Say Die	Arabian Night	Darius
1953
Pinza	Aureole	Pink Horse
1952
Tulyar	Gay Time	Faubourg
1951
Arctic Prince	Sybil's Nephew	Signal Box

1950-1946
1950
Galcador	Prince Simon	Double Eclipse
1949
Nimbus	Amour Drake	Swallow Tail
1948
My Love	Royal Drake	Noor
1947
Pearl Diver	Migoli	Sayajirao
1946
Airborne	Gulf Stream	Radiotherapy

== Records ==
=== Leading jockey (9 wins) ===
- Lester Piggott – Never Say Die (1954), Crepello (1957), St. Paddy (1960), Sir Ivor (1968), Nijinsky (1970), Roberto (1972), Empery (1976), The Minstrel (1977), Teenoso (1983)

=== Leading trainer (12 wins) ===
- Aidan O'Brien – Galileo (2001), High Chaparral (2002), Camelot (2012), Ruler of the World (2013), Australia (2014), Wings of Eagles (2017), Anthony Van Dyck (2019), Serpentine (2020), Auguste Rodin (2023), City of Troy (2024), Lambourn (2025), Christmas Day (2026)

=== Leading owner (13 wins): (includes part ownership) ===
- Sue Magnier, Michael Tabor – Galileo (2001), High Chaparral (2002), Pour Moi (2011), Camelot (2012), Ruler of the World (2013), Australia (2014), Wings of Eagles (2017), Anthony Van Dyck (2019), Serpentine (2020), Auguste Rodin (2023), City of Troy (2024), Lambourn (2025), Christmas Day (2026)

=== Leading sire (5 wins) ===
- Galileo – New Approach (2008), Ruler of the World (2013), Australia (2014), Anthony Van Dyck (2019), Serpentine (2020)

=== Dams of two winners ===
- Flyer (Rhadamanthus and Daedalus)
- Highflyer mare, known as Eagle's Dam, (Didelot and Spread Eagle)
- Horatia (Archduke and Paris)
- Arethusa (Ditto and Pan)
- Penelope (Whalebone and Whisker)
- Canopus mare (Lap-dog and Spaniel)
- Arcot Lass (St. Giles and Bloomsbury)
- Emma (Mündig and Cotherstone)
- Perdita II (Persimmon and Diamond Jubilee)
- Morganette (Galtee More and Ard Patrick)
- Windmill Girl (Blakeney and Morston)
- Urban Sea (Galileo and Sea the Stars)

=== Other records ===
- Fastest winning time (at Epsom) – 2m 31.33s, Workforce (2010)
- Widest winning margin – 10 lengths, Shergar (1981)
- Longest odds winners – Jeddah (1898), Signorinetta (1908), Aboyeur (1913), 100/1
- Shortest odds winner – Ladas (1894), 2/9
- Most runners – 34 (1862)
- Fewest runners – 4 (1794)

== Winners ==
Year	Winner	Jockey	Trainer	Owner	Distance	Time
1780	Diomed	Sam Arnull	R. Teasdale	Sir Charles Bunbury
1781	Young Eclipse	Charles Hindley		Dennis O'Kelly
1782	Assassin	Sam Arnull	Frank Neale	3rd Earl of Egremont
1783	Saltram	Charles Hindley	Frank Neale	John Parker
1784	Serjeant	John Arnull		Dennis O'Kelly
1785	Aimwell	Charles Hindley	John Pratt	1st Earl of Clermont
1786	Noble	J. White	Frank Neale	Tommy Panton
1787	Sir Peter Teazle	Sam Arnull	Saunders	12th Earl of Derby
1788	Sir Thomas	William South	Frank Neale	Prince of Wales
1789	Skyscraper	Sam Chifney	Matt Stephenson	5th Duke of Bedford
1790	Rhadamanthus	John Arnull	John Pratt	1st Earl Grosvenor
1791	Eager	Matt Stephenson	Matt Stephenson	5th Duke of Bedford
1792	John Bull	Frank Buckle	John Pratt	1st Earl Grosvenor
1793	Waxy	Bill Clift	Robert Robson	Sir Ferdinand Poole
1794	Daedalus	Frank Buckle	John Pratt	1st Earl Grosvenor
1795	Spread Eagle	Anthony Wheatley	Richard Prince	Sir Frank Standish
1796	Didelot	John Arnull	Richard Prince	Sir Frank Standish
1797	Colt by Fidget	John Singleton, Jr.	Matt Stephenson	5th Duke of Bedford
1798	Sir Harry	Sam Arnull	Frank Neale	Joseph Cookson
1799	Archduke	John Arnull	Richard Prince	Sir Frank Standish
1800	Champion	Bill Clift	Tom Perren	Christopher Wilson
1801	Eleanor	John Saunders	J. Frost	Sir Charles Bunbury
1802	Tyrant	Frank Buckle	Robert Robson	3rd Duke of Grafton
1803	Ditto	Bill Clift	John Lonsdale	Sir Hedworth Williamson
1804	Hannibal	Bill Arnull	Frank Neale	3rd Earl of Egremont
1805	Cardinal Beaufort	Dennis Fitzpatrick	Dixon Boyce	3rd Earl of Egremont
1806	Paris	John Shepherd	Richard Prince	3rd Baron Foley
1807	Election	John Arnull	Dixon Boyce	3rd Earl of Egremont
1808	Pan	Frank Collinson	John Lonsdale	Sir Hedworth Williamson
1809	Pope	Tom Goodisson	Robert Robson	3rd Duke of Grafton	nk
1810	Whalebone	Bill Clift	Robert Robson	3rd Duke of Grafton
1811	Phantom	Frank Buckle	James Edwards	Sir John Shelley	hd
1812	Octavius	Bill Arnull	Dixon Boyce	Robert Ladbroke	hd
1813	Smolensko	Tom Goodisson	Crouch	Sir Charles Bunbury	1
1814	Blucher	Bill Arnull	Dixon Boyce	2nd Baron Stawell
1815	Whisker	Tom Goodisson	Robert Robson	4th Duke of Grafton	shd
1816	Prince Leopold	Will Wheatley	William Butler	Duke of York	½
1817	Azor	Jem Robinson	Robert Robson	John Payne
1818	Sam	Sam Chifney, Jr.	William Chifney	Thomas Thornhill	¾
1819	Tiresias	Bill Clift	Richard Prince	4th Duke of Portland	nk
1820	Sailor	Sam Chifney, Jr.	William Chifney	Thomas Thornhill	2
1821	Gustavus	Sam Day	Crouch	John Hunter	½
1822	Moses	Tom Goodisson	William Butler	Duke of York	hd
1823	Emilius	Frank Buckle	Robert Robson	John Udny	1
1824	Cedric	Jem Robinson	James Edwards	Sir John Shelley
1825	Middleton	Jem Robinson	James Edwards	5th Earl of Jersey
1826	Lap-dog	George Dockeray	R. Stephenson	3rd Earl of Egremont
1827	Mameluke	Jem Robinson	James Edwards	5th Earl of Jersey
1828	Cadland	Jem Robinson	Dixon Boyce	5th Duke of Rutland	dh (Note: The 1828 race finished as a dead-heat, but Cadland won a run-off against The Colonel by ½ length)
1829	Frederick	John Forth	John Forth	William Gratwicke	hd
1830	Priam	Sam Day	William Chifney	William Chifney	2
1831	Spaniel	Will Wheatley	J. Rogers	Viscount Lowther
1832	St. Giles	Bill Scott	J. Webb	Robert Ridsdale	2
1833	Dangerous	Jem Chapple	Isaac Sadler	Isaac Sadler	1
1834	Plenipotentiary	Patrick Conolly	George Payne	Stanlake Batson	2
1835	Mündig	Bill Scott	John Scott	John Bowes	nk
1836	Bay Middleton	Jem Robinson	James Edwards	5th Earl of Jersey	2
1837	Phosphorus	George Edwards	John Doe	Lord Berners	nk
1838	Amato	Jem Chapple	Ralph Sherwood	Sir Gilbert Heathcote
1839	Bloomsbury	Sim Templeman	William Ridsdale	William Ridsdale	1
1840	Little Wonder	William Macdonald	John Forth	David Robertson	1
1841	Coronation	Patrick Conolly	Ben Painter	Abraham Rawlinson	3
1842	Attila	Bill Scott	John Scott	George Anson	2
1843	Cotherstone	Bill Scott	John Scott	John Bowes	2
1844	Orlando (Note: The 1844 and 1913 winners were awarded victory after the disqualification of the first-placed horse)	Nat Flatman	W. Cooper	Jonathan Peel
1845	The Merry Monarch	Foster Bell	John Forth	William Gratwicke	1
1846	Pyrrhus The First	Sam Day	John Day	John Gully	nk	2:55
1847	Cossack	Sim Templeman	John Day	T. H. Pedley	1	2:52
1848	Surplice	Sim Templeman	John Kent, Jr.	3rd Viscount Clifden	nk	2:48
1849	The Flying Dutchman	Charles Marlow	John Fobert	13th Earl of Eglinton	snk	3:00
1850	Voltigeur	Job Marson	Robert Hill	2nd Earl of Zetland	1	2:50
1851	Teddington	Job Marson	Alec Taylor, Sr.	Sir Joseph Hawley	2	2:51
1852	Daniel O'Rourke	Frank Butler	John Scott	John Bowes	½	3:02
1853	West Australian	Frank Butler	John Scott	John Bowes	nk	2:55
1854	Andover	Alfred Day	John Day	John Gully	1	2:52
1855	Wild Dayrell	Robert Sherwood	John Rickaby	Francis Popham	1	2:54
1856	Ellington	Tom Aldcroft	Tom Dawson	Octavius Vernon Harcourt	1	3:04
1857	Blink Bonny	Jack Charlton	William I'Anson	William I'Anson	nk	2:45
1858	Beadsman	John Wells	George Manning	Sir Joseph Hawley	1	2:54
1859	Musjid	John Wells	George Manning	Sir Joseph Hawley	½	2:59
1860	Thormanby	Harry Custance	Mathew Dawson	James Merry	1½	2:55
1861	Kettledrum	Ralph Bullock	G. Oates	Charles Towneley	1	2:45
1862	Caractacus	John Parsons	Robert Smith	Charles Snewing	nk	2:45
1863	Macaroni	Tom Chaloner	James Godding	Richard Naylor	hd	2:50
1864	Blair Athol	Jim Snowden	William I'Anson	William I'Anson	2	2:43
1865	Gladiateur	Harry Grimshaw	Tom Jennings, Sr.	Frédéric de Lagrange	2	2:46
1866	Lord Lyon	Harry Custance	James Dover	Richard Sutton	hd	2:50
1867	Hermit	John Daley	G. Bloss	Henry Chaplin	nk	2:42
1868	Blue Gown	John Wells	John Porter	Sir Joseph Hawley	½	2:43
1869	Pretender	John Osborne Jr.	Tom Dawson	John Johnstone	shd	2:52
1870	Kingcraft	Tom French	Mathew Dawson	6th Viscount Falmouth	4	2:45
1871	Favonius	Tom French	Joseph Hayhoe	Mayer A. de Rothschild	1½	2:50
1872	Cremorne	Charlie Maidment	William Gilbert	Henry Savile	hd	2:45
1873	Doncaster	Fred Webb	Robert Peck	James Merry	1½	2:50
1874	George Frederick	Harry Custance	Tom Leader	W. S. Cartwright	2	2:46
1875	Galopin	Jack Morris	John Dawson	Gusztáv Batthyány	1	2:48
1876	Kisber	Charlie Maidment	Joseph Hayhoe	Alexander Baltazzi	5	2:44
1877	Silvio	Fred Archer	Mathew Dawson	6th Viscount Falmouth	½	2:50
1878	Sefton	Harry Constable	Alec Taylor, Sr.	William Stirling Crawfurd	1½	2:56
1879	Sir Bevys	George Fordham	Joseph Hayhoe	Lionel de Rothschild	¾	3:02
1880	Bend Or	Fred Archer	Robert Peck	1st Duke of Westminster	hd	2:46
1881	Iroquois	Fred Archer	Jacob Pincus	Pierre Lorillard IV	nk	2:50
1882	Shotover	Tom Cannon, Sr.	John Porter	1st Duke of Westminster	¾	2:45
1883	St. Blaise	Charles Wood	John Porter	Sir Frederick Johnstone	hd	2:48
1884 (dh)	Harvester; St. Gatien	Sam Loates; Charles Wood	James Jewitt; Robert Sherwood	Sir J. Willoughby; Jack Hammond	dh	2:46
1885	Melton	Fred Archer	Mathew Dawson	20th Baron Hastings	hd	2:44
1886	Ormonde	Fred Archer	John Porter	1st Duke of Westminster	1½	2:45.6
1887	Merry Hampton	John Watts	Martin Gurry	George Alexander Baird	4	2:43
1888	Ayrshire	Fred Barrett	George Dawson	6th Duke of Portland	2	2:43
1889	Donovan	Tommy Loates	George Dawson	6th Duke of Portland	1½	2:44
1890	Sainfoin	John Watts	John Porter	James Miller	¾	2:49
1891	Common	George Barrett	John Porter	Sir Frederick Johnstone	2	2:56
1892	Sir Hugo	Fred Allsopp	Tom Wadlow	3rd Earl of Bradford	¾	2:44
1893	Isinglass	Tommy Loates	James Jewitt	Harry McCalmont	1½	2:43
1894	Ladas	John Watts	Mathew Dawson	5th Earl of Rosebery	1½	2:45
1895	Sir Visto	Sam Loates	Mathew Dawson	5th Earl of Rosebery	¾	2:43
1896	Persimmon	John Watts	Richard Marsh	Prince of Wales	nk	2:42
1897	Galtee More	Charles Wood	Sam Darling	John Gubbins	2	2:44
1898	Jeddah	Otto Madden	Richard Marsh	James Larnach	¾	2:47
1899	Flying Fox	Morny Cannon	John Porter	1st Duke of Westminster	2	2:42
1900	Diamond Jubilee	Herbert Jones	Richard Marsh	Prince of Wales	½	2:42
1901	Volodyovski	Lester Reiff	John Huggins	William C. Whitney	¾	2:40.8
1902	Ard Patrick	Skeets Martin	Sam Darling	John Gubbins	3	2:42.2
1903	Rock Sand	Danny Maher	George Blackwell	James Miller	2	2:42.8
1904	St. Amant	Kempton Cannon	Alfred Hayhoe	Leopold de Rothschild	3	2:45.4
1905	Cicero	Danny Maher	Percy Peck	5th Earl of Rosebery	¾	2:39.6
1906	Spearmint	Danny Maher	Peter Gilpin	Major Eustace Loder	1½	2:36.8
1907	Orby	John Reiff	Fred McCabe	Richard Croker	2	2:44
1908	Signorinetta	Billy Bullock	Edoardo Ginistrelli	Edoardo Ginistrelli	2	2:39.8
1909	Minoru	Herbert Jones	Richard Marsh	King Edward VII	shd	2:42.7
1910	Lemberg	Bernard Dillon	Alec Taylor, Jr.	Alfred Cox	nk	2:35.2
1911	Sunstar	George Stern	Charles Morton	Jack Barnato Joel	2	2:36.8
1912	Tagalie	John Reiff	Dawson Waugh	Walter Raphael	4	2:38.8
1913	Aboyeur	Edwin Piper	Tom Lewis	Alan Cunliffe	nk	2:37.6
1914	Durbar	Matt McGee	Tom Murphy	Herman Duryea	3	2:38.4
1915	Pommern	Steve Donoghue	Charles Peck	Solomon Joel	2	2:32.6
1916	Fifinella	Joe Childs	Dick Dawson	Sir Edward Hulton	nk	2:36.6
1917	Gay Crusader	Steve Donoghue	Alec Taylor, Jr.	Alfred Cox	4	2:40.6
1918	Gainsborough	Joe Childs	Alec Taylor, Jr.	Lady James Douglas	1½	2:33.2
1919	Grand Parade	Fred Templeman	Frank Barling	1st Baron Glanely	½	2:35.8
1920	Spion Kop	Frank O'Neill	Peter Gilpin	Giles Loder	2	2:34.8
1921	Humorist	Steve Donoghue	Charles Morton	Jack Barnato Joel	nk	2:36.2
1922	Captain Cuttle	Steve Donoghue	Fred Darling	1st Baron Woolavington	4	2:34.6
1923	Papyrus	Steve Donoghue	Basil Jarvis	Ben Irish	1	2:38
1924	Sansovino	Tommy Weston	George Lambton	17th Earl of Derby	6	2:46
1925	Manna	Steve Donoghue	Fred Darling	Henry E. Morriss	8	2:40.6
1926	Coronach	Joe Childs	Fred Darling	1st Baron Woolavington	5	2:47.8
1927	Call Boy	Charlie Elliott	John E. Watts	Frank Curzon	2	2:34.4
1928	Felstead	Harry Wragg	Ossie Bell	Sir Hugo Cunliffe-Owen	1½	2:34.8
1929	Trigo	Joe Marshall	Dick Dawson	William Barnett	1½	2:36.4
1930	Blenheim	Harry Wragg	Dick Dawson	Aga Khan III	1	2:38.2
1931	Cameronian	Freddie Fox	Fred Darling	Arthur Dewar	¾	2:36.6
1932	April the Fifth	Fred Lane	Tom Walls	Tom Walls	¾	2:43.2
1933	Hyperion	Tommy Weston	George Lambton	17th Earl of Derby	4	2:34
1934	Windsor Lad	Charles Smirke	Marcus Marsh	Maharaja Sir Vijaysinhji of Rajpipla	1	2:34
1935	Bahram	Freddie Fox	Frank Butters	Aga Khan III	2	2:36
1936	Mahmoud	Charles Smirke	Frank Butters	Aga Khan III	3	2:33.8
1937	Mid-day Sun	Michael Beary	Fred Butters	Lettice Mary Miller	1½	2:37.6
1938	Bois Roussel	Charlie Elliott	Fred Darling	Peter Beatty	4	2:39.2
1939	Blue Peter	Eph Smith	Jack Jarvis	6th Earl of Rosebery	4	2:36.8
1940	Pont l'Eveque	Sam Wragg	Fred Darling	Fred Darling	3	2:30.8
1941	Owen Tudor	Billy Nevett	Fred Darling	C. Macdonald-Buchanan	1½	2:32
1942	Watling Street	Harry Wragg	Walter Earl	17th Earl of Derby	nk	2:29.6
1943	Straight Deal	Tommy Carey	Walter Nightingall	Dorothy Paget	hd	2:30.4
1944	Ocean Swell	Billy Nevett	Jack Jarvis	6th Earl of Rosebery	nk	2:31
1945	Dante	Billy Nevett	Matthew Peacock	Sir Eric Ohlson	2	2:26.6
1946	Airborne	Tommy Lowrey	Dick Perryman	John E. Ferguson	1	2:44.6
1947	Pearl Diver	Georges Bridgland	Percy Carter	Baron Geoffroy de Waldner	4	2:38.4
1948	My Love	Rae Johnstone	Richard Carver	Aga Khan III / Volterra	1½	2:40
1949	Nimbus	Charlie Elliott	George Colling	Marion Glenister	hd	2:42
1950	Galcador	Rae Johnstone	Charles Semblat	Marcel Boussac	hd	2:36.8
1951	Arctic Prince	Chuck Spares	Willie Stephenson	Joseph McGrath	6	2:39.4
1952	Tulyar	Charles Smirke	Marcus Marsh	Aga Khan III	¾	2:36.4
1953	Pinza	Sir Gordon Richards	Norman Bertie	Sir Victor Sassoon	4	2:35.6
1954	Never Say Die	Lester Piggott	Joseph Lawson	Robert Sterling Clark	2	2:35.8
1955	Phil Drake	Freddie Palmer	François Mathet	Suzy Volterra	2	2:39.8
1956	Lavandin	Rae Johnstone	Alec Head	Pierre Wertheimer	nk	2:36.4
1957	Crepello	Lester Piggott	Noel Murless	Sir Victor Sassoon	1½	2:35.4
1958	Hard Ridden	Charles Smirke	Mick Rogers	Sir Victor Sassoon	5	2:41.2
1959	Parthia	Harry Carr	Cecil Boyd-Rochfort	Sir Humphrey de Trafford	1½	2:36.0
1960	St. Paddy	Lester Piggott	Noel Murless	Sir Victor Sassoon	3	2:35.8
1961	Psidium	Roger Poincelet	Harry Wragg	Etti Plesch	2	2:36.4
1962	Larkspur	Neville Sellwood	Vincent O'Brien	Raymond R. Guest	2	2:37.6
1963	Relko	Yves Saint-Martin	François Mathet	François Dupré	6	2:39.4
1964	Santa Claus	Scobie Breasley	Mick Rogers	John Ismay	1	2:41.98
1965	Sea Bird	Pat Glennon	Etienne Pollet	Jean Ternynck	2	2:38.41
1966	Charlottown	Scobie Breasley	Gordon Smyth	Lady Zia Wernher	nk	2:37.63
1967	Royal Palace	George Moore	Noel Murless	Jim Joel	2½	2:38.36
1968	Sir Ivor	Lester Piggott	Vincent O'Brien	Raymond R. Guest	1½	2:38.73
1969	Blakeney	Ernie Johnson	Arthur Budgett	Arthur Budgett	1	2:40.30
1970	Nijinsky	Lester Piggott	Vincent O'Brien	Charles W. Engelhard, Jr.	2½	2:34.68
1971	Mill Reef	Geoff Lewis	Ian Balding	Paul Mellon	2	2:37.14
1972	Roberto	Lester Piggott	Vincent O'Brien	John W. Galbreath	shd	2:36.09
1973	Morston	Edward Hide	Arthur Budgett	Arthur Budgett	½	2:35.92
1974	Snow Knight	Brian Taylor	Peter Nelson	Sharon Phillips	2	2:35.04
1975	Grundy	Pat Eddery	Peter Walwyn	Carlo Vittadini	3	2:35.35
1976	Empery	Lester Piggott	Maurice Zilber	Nelson Bunker Hunt	3	2:35.69
1977	The Minstrel	Lester Piggott	Vincent O'Brien	Robert Sangster	nk	2:36.44
1978	Shirley Heights	Greville Starkey	John Dunlop	2nd Earl of Halifax	hd	2:35.30
1979	Troy	Willie Carson	Dick Hern	Sobell / Weinstock	7	2:36.59
1980	Henbit	Willie Carson	Dick Hern	Etti Plesch	½	2:34.77
1981	Shergar	Walter Swinburn	Michael Stoute	Aga Khan IV	10	2:44.21
1982	Golden Fleece	Pat Eddery	Vincent O'Brien	Robert Sangster	3	2:34.27
1983	Teenoso	Lester Piggott	Geoff Wragg	Eric Moller	3	2:49.07
1984	Secreto	Christy Roche	David O'Brien	Luigi Miglietti	shd	2:39.12
1985	Slip Anchor	Steve Cauthen	Henry Cecil	Lord Howard de Walden	7	2:36.23
1986	Shahrastani	Walter Swinburn	Michael Stoute	Aga Khan IV	½	2:37.13
1987	Reference Point	Steve Cauthen	Henry Cecil	Louis Freedman	1½	2:33.90
1988	Kahyasi	Ray Cochrane	Luca Cumani	Aga Khan IV	1½	2:33.84
1989	Nashwan	Willie Carson	Dick Hern	Hamdan Al Maktoum	5	2:34.90
1990	Quest for Fame	Pat Eddery	Roger Charlton	Khalid Abdullah	3	2:37.26
1991	Generous	Alan Munro	Paul Cole	Prince Fahd bin Salman	5	2:34.00
1992	Dr Devious	John Reid	Peter Chapple-Hyam	Sidney H. Craig	2	2:36.19
1993	Commander in Chief	Michael Kinane	Henry Cecil	Khalid Abdullah	3½	2:34.51
1994	Erhaab	Willie Carson	John Dunlop	Hamdan Al Maktoum	1¼	2:34.16
1995	Lammtarra	Walter Swinburn	Saeed bin Suroor	Saeed bin M. Al Maktoum	1	2:32.31
1996	Shaamit	Michael Hills	William Haggas	Khalifa Dasmal	1¼	2:35.05
1997	Benny the Dip	Willie Ryan	John Gosden	Landon Knight	shd	2:35.77
1998	High-Rise	Olivier Peslier	Luca Cumani	M. Obaid Al Maktoum	hd	2:33.88
1999	Oath	Kieren Fallon	Henry Cecil	The Thoroughbred Corp.	1¾	2:37.43
2000	Sinndar	Johnny Murtagh	John Oxx	Aga Khan IV	1	2:36.75
2001	Galileo	Michael Kinane	Aidan O'Brien	Magnier / Tabor	3½	2:33.27
2002	High Chaparral	Johnny Murtagh	Aidan O'Brien	Magnier / Tabor	2	2:39.45
2003	Kris Kin	Kieren Fallon	Sir Michael Stoute	Saeed Suhail	1	2:33.35
2004	North Light	Kieren Fallon	Sir Michael Stoute	Ballymacoll Stud	1½	2:33.72
2005	Motivator	Johnny Murtagh	Michael Bell	Royal Ascot Racing Club	5	2:35.69
2006	Sir Percy	Martin Dwyer	Marcus Tregoning	Anthony Pakenham	shd	2:35.23
2007	Authorized	Frankie Dettori	Peter Chapple-Hyam	Al Homaizi / Al Sagar	5	2:34.77
2008	New Approach	Kevin Manning	Jim Bolger	Princess Haya of Jordan	½	2:36.50
2009	Sea the Stars	Michael Kinane	John Oxx	Christopher Tsui	1¾	2:36.74
2010	Workforce	Ryan Moore	Sir Michael Stoute	Khalid Abdullah	7	2:31.33
2011	Pour Moi	Mickael Barzalona	André Fabre	Magnier / Tabor / Smith	hd	2:34.54
2012	Camelot	Joseph O'Brien	Aidan O'Brien	Smith / Magnier / Tabor /	5	2:33.90
2013	Ruler of the World	Ryan Moore	Aidan O'Brien	Magnier / Tabor / Smith	1½	2:39.06
2014	Australia	Joseph O'Brien	Aidan O'Brien	Smith, Magnier, Tabor, Khing	1¼	2:33.63
2015	Golden Horn	Frankie Dettori	John Gosden	Anthony Oppenheimer	3½	2:32.32
2016	Harzand	Pat Smullen	Dermot Weld	Aga Khan IV	1½	2:40.09
2017	Wings of Eagles	Padraig Beggy	Aidan O'Brien	Smith / Magnier / Tabor	¾	2:33.02
2018	Masar	William Buick	Charlie Appleby	Godolphin	1½	2:34.93
2019	Anthony Van Dyck	Seamie Heffernan	Aidan O'Brien	Smith / Magnier / Tabor	½	2:33.38
2020 (Note: The 2020 race was run in July due to the COVID-19 pandemic in the United Kingdom)	Serpentine	Emmet McNamara	Aidan O'Brien	Tabor / Smith / Magnier	5½	2:34.43
2021	Adayar	Adam Kirby	Charlie Appleby	Godolphin	4½	2:36.85
2022	Desert Crown	Richard Kingscote	Sir Michael Stoute	Saeed Suhail	2½	2:36.38
2023	Auguste Rodin	Ryan Moore	Aidan O'Brien	Tabor / Smith / Magnier / Westerberg	½	2:33.88
2024	City Of Troy	Ryan Moore	Aidan O'Brien	Magnier /Tabor / Smith /	2¾	2:38.32
2025	Lambourn	Wayne Lordan	Aidan O'Brien	Magnier /Tabor / Smith	3¾	2:38.50
2026	Christmas Day	Ronan Whelan	Aidan O'Brien	Magnier /Tabor / Smith / Westerberg / Brant	2¾	2:43.75

Winning distances are shown in lengths or shorter (dh = dead-heat; shd = short-head; hd = head; snk = short-neck; nk = neck).

Wartime substitute race at Newmarket

== See also ==
- Derby (horse race)
- Horse racing in Great Britain
- List of British flat horse races
