= 1780 Epsom Derby =

First annual running of the Derby horse race on 4 May 1780 on Epsom Downs, Surrey

- Derby
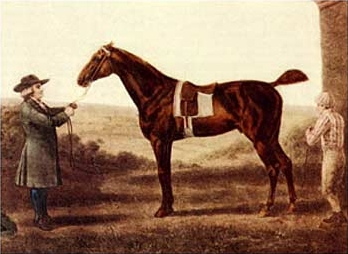
- Diomed by George Stubbs (1724–1806)
- Location: Epsom Downs
- Date: 4 May 1780
- Winning horse: Diomed
- Starting price: 6/4
- Jockey: Sam Arnull
- Trainer: R Teasdale
- Owner: Sir Charles Bunbury
- Conditions: not known

The 1780 Epsom Derby was the inaugural running of The Derby – the horse race which would become the "greatest turf event in the world" and after which more than 140 other horse races, including the famous Kentucky Derby, are named. It took place on 4 May 1780 on Epsom Downs in Surrey, England, and was won by Diomed, owned by Sir Charles Bunbury and ridden by Sam Arnull.

== Background ==
At the previous year's Epsom May race meeting, Lord Derby had instigated a 1 1/2 mile race for three-year-old fillies, which he had named the Oaks after his nearby estate. His filly Bridget had won the race, and it had been a great success. Accordingly, a post-race celebration was held by Lord Derby, at which it was decided to hold another new race for both colts and fillies the following year. The matter of naming the race was discussed, with the options being naming it after Derby himself or naming it after Sir Charles Bunbury, a member of the Jockey Club, who was Derby's guest at the Oaks. According to legend, the matter was settled in Derby's favour on the toss of a coin, although it seems likely that Bunbury actually deferred to his host.

This first Derby was set to be run over only 1 mile, as were the next three. It was not until 1784 that the race was run over its now familiar distance of 1 mile 4 furlongs. Colts were to be allotted a weight of 8 stone, fillies 7 stone 11 lbs, another difference between this first race and subsequent runnings.

== Pre-race form ==
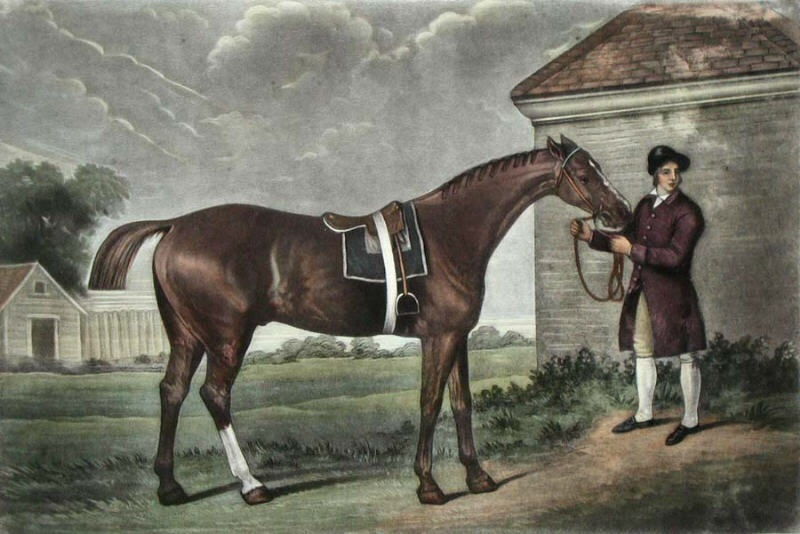
Eclipse, sire of three of the contenders, as painted by George Stubbs (1724–1806)

Initially, there were 36 subscribers to the race, 27 of which remained at the forfeit stage. Of these, 9 finally went to post on the day.

Among them were three colts (Note: Spitfire is listed as "Mr Walker's filly" in the London report, but as a colt in the 1780 Racing Calendar. A similar situation exists with Polydore. Listed as a colt owned by the Duke of Cumberland in the Racing Calendar, he/she is found as a filly on pedigree lists) sired by the unbeaten Eclipse – Boudrow (owned by Eclipse's owner-breeder, the gambler and conman Dennis O'Kelly), Spitfire (owned by a Mr Walker) and Polydore (owned by the Duke Of Cumberland).

Also in the field was Diomed, which in his only outing so far had won a 500 guineas sweepstake at the Second Newmarket Spring meeting, carrying 8 stone. He was less auspiciously bred, being by Florizel, but was beginning to be compared to the sire of his rivals, Eclipse. Another representative from the same line was Drone, a colt by Herod who was Florizel's sire and Diomed's grandsire. The field was completed by Diadem, which had been behind Diomed at Newmarket, Wotton, and unnamed colts by Gimcrack and Matchem.

Diomed's unbeaten form led to him going to post as the 6/4 favourite. The two Eclipse colts, Boudrow and Spitfire, were next in the betting at 4/1 and 7/1 respectively. The Matchem colt, owned by the Duke of Bolton was at 10/1.

== Raceday ==
The first running of the Derby had "nothing like its later glamour and importance." Rather than being the showpiece event it is today, it was sandwiched into a programme that included "cokfights [sic] between the gentlemen of Middlesex and the gentlemen of Wiltshire". In fact, Lord Derby himself was known to prefer cock-fighting to horse racing. Moreover, in those days, the journey from London to Epsom took around 12 to 14 hours over difficult roads.

All this combined to mean there were few spectators. The day is reported to have a comparatively meagre attendance, probably fewer than 5,000. Also in contrast to today, there were no professional bookmakers, the gentlemen making books among themselves. All in all, it could be said that, "no public interest had yet attached itself to a race destined ultimately to become world famous".

There are at least two published notices of the result. One was in the London Evening Post on 6 May 1780 which read thus:

Thursday – The Derby Stakes of 50gs each; h. ft. colts and fillies. The last mile of the course.
– Sir C. Bunbury's ch c, 1;
– Mr O'Kelly's b c 2;
– Mr Walker's f, 3;
– Sir Evelyn's br c, 4.

The other in the 1780 Racing Calendar gave the full result. Diomed had won as the betting market had predicted, followed by the two Eclipse colts, Boudrow and Spitfire. The field trailed back to the Duke of Bolton's colt by Matchem.

== Aftermath ==
The victory proved to be the high water mark of Diomed's racing career. Although he went unbeaten through his seven three-year-old races, at four he proved more than beatable. He was beaten for the first time in the Nottingham Stakes by Fortitude owned by Lord Grosvenor, a race he was fully expected to win. Boudrow also got his revenge, beating Diomed in a 300 guineas match race at Newmarket. Diomed was in fact to win only once more before being put out to stud, where after initial problems he became tremendously successful, especially in the United States where he founded many important families. He died aged 31.

Boudrow's owner, Dennis O'Kelly, would not have to wait long for his first Derby win, Young Eclipse triumphing the following year. Meanwhile the race itself "fairly caught hold on the public imagination." It became the premier British classic and many of the world's top championship races were named after it.

== Race details ==
- Winner's prize money: £1,065 15s
- Going: not known
- Number of runners: 9
- Winner's time: not known

== Full result ==
	Horse (Note: Apart from the first three, horse names are not given in the 1780 Racing Calendar report of the result, but they are available elsewhere)	Jockey	Trainer	Owner	Starting price
1	Diomed	Sam Arnull	R Teasdale	Sir Charles Bunbury	6/4 fav
2	Boudrow (or Boudron or Budroo)	not known	not known	Dennis O'Kelly	4/1
3	Spitfire	not known	not known	Mr Walker	7/1
4	Wotton	not known	not known	Sir Frederick Evelyn	not known
5	Drone	not known	not known	Mr Panton	not known
6	Polydore	not known	not known	Duke Of Cumberland	not known
7	Diadem	not known	not known	M. Sulfh	not known
8	Grey colt by Gimcrack	not known	not known	Mr Dolmo	not known
9	Colt by Matchem	not known	not known	Duke of Bolton	10/1

== Winner details ==
Further details of the winner, Diomed:

- Foaled: 1777
- Sire: Florizel
- Dam: Mare (1763) by Spectator
- Owner: Sir Charles Bunbury
- Breeder: Hon. Richard Vernon of Newmarket

== Bibliography ==
- Mortimer, Roger; Onslow, Richard; Willett, Peter (1978). Biographical Encyclopaedia of British Racing. London: Macdonald and Jane's. ISBN 0-354-08536-0.
