= Samuel Barenger =

British engraver

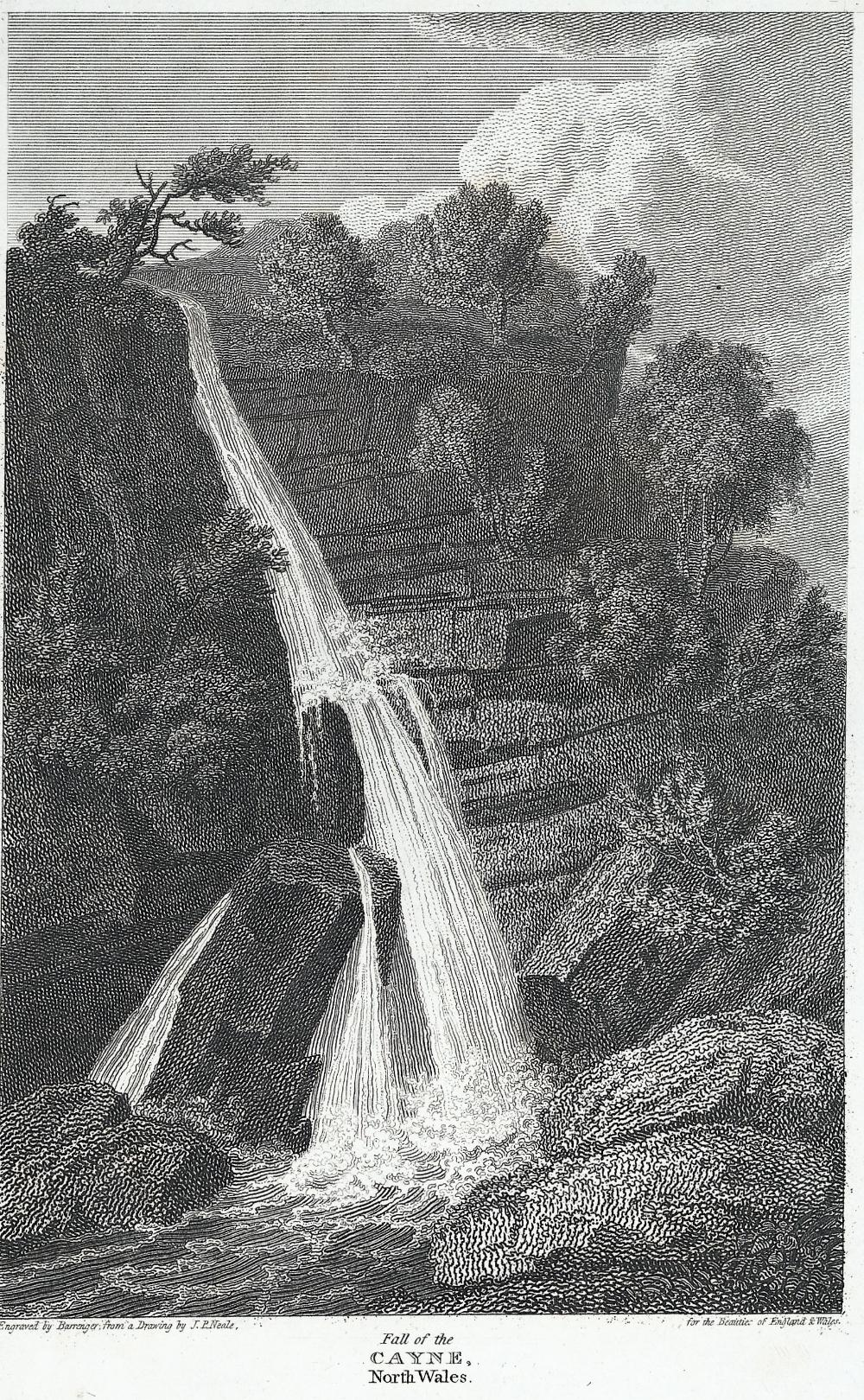
Fall of the Cayne (Pistyll Cain waterfall), north Wales from a drawing by John Preston Neale

Major Samuel Barenger (6 May 1776 – 1837) was a British engraver also known by his signature M.S. Barenger and S Barenger. His work was included in Cadell and Davies' Britannia depicta. One of his engravings was included in an 1809 publication featuring the architectural antiquities of Great Britain. According to the Benezit Dictionary of British Graphic Artists and Illustrators published by Oxford University Press he was active in London and exhibited in the Suffolk Street Gallery in 1823. He was also part of an 1821 exhibition in Soho Square. His works dates from 1807 until the 1830s. Two of his engravings based on his brother's paintings were included in the 1824 "Annals of Sporting".

Barenger was born on 6 May 1776 and christened in St Pancras Old Church on 3 June. His parents were John Luff Barenger and his wife Mary, née Woollett (presumed to be the sister of the engraver William Woollett). The animal painter James Barenger was either his younger brother, eldest brother, or uncle depending on the source. His work dates from about 1807 until the 1830s. He did not use his first name, Major, professionally.

The Views of the seats of noblemen and gentlemen : in England, Wales, Scotland, and Ireland / from drawings by J.P. Neale (John Preston Neale) 1780-1847 held by the Yale Center for British Art includes his engraving work.
