= Didelot (horse) =

British Thoroughbred racehorse

- Sire: Trumpator
- Grandsire: Conductor
- Dam: Highflyer mare
- Damsire: Highflyer
- Sex: Stallion
- Foaled: 1793
- Country: Kingdom of Great Britain
- Colour: Bay
- Breeder: Sir Frank Standish
- Owner: Sir Frank Standish
- Trainer: Richard Prince
- Record: 10:2-4-2

Major wins
- Prince's Stakes (1796); Epsom Derby (1796)

Didelot (1793 – after 1798) was a British Thoroughbred racehorse and sire. In a career that lasted from March 1796 to October 1798 he ran ten times and won two races. In 1796 he won a race at Newmarket and then defeated ten opponents, including his more fancied stable companion to win The Derby. His subsequent form was disappointing, as he failed to win in his remaining seven races. At the end of his racing career he was exported to stand at stud in Russia.

== Background ==
Didelot was bred by his owner Sir Frank Standish. He was the second of ten foals produced by an unnamed Highflyer mare bred by Mr Tattersall. Her first foal had been the 1795 Derby winner Spread Eagle and she went on to produce Eagle, the beaten favourite in the 1799 Derby. Didelot was sired by Lord Clermont's black stallion Trumpator, who won several races at Newmarket in 1786 and went on to become a "huge success" at stud being Champion sire in 1803.

== Racing career ==
=== 1796: three-year-old season ===
Didelot began his racing career at Newmarket's Craven meeting in spring 1796. On 28 March he started 7/4 favourite for the Produce Stakes over ten furlongs "Across the Flat" and finished second of the four runners to Mr Hallett's colt Stickler. Didelot ran over the same course and distance on 13 April and recorded his first win. Running against three opponents in the second class of the Prince's Stakes, he started 4/5 favourite and won from Lord Darlington's Tally-Ho!

The 11/8 favourite for the Derby at Epsom was Didelot's stable companion, an unnamed brown colt sired by Sir Peter who would later be given the name Mr. Teazle. Despite his win at Newmarket, Didelot did not feature in the betting, suggesting that his role in the race was to provide pace and support for Mr. Teazle. Ridden by the experienced John Arnull (or Arnold), he won from Stickler, the Duke of Bedford's Leviathan and eight others. Mr. Teazle was unplaced.

At Newmarket in autumn, Didelot ran twice over the two mile "Ditch In" course. On 4 October he ran in a 100 guineas Sweepstakes and was beaten at level weights by Leviathan. Two weeks later Didelot and Leviathan were the only runners for the Main class of the Prince's Stakes, with victory again going to the Duke of Bedford's colt.

=== 1797: four-year-old season ===
Didelot ran three times as a four-year-old without showing any worthwhile form. On 17 April he ran in a 300-guinea match race over the "Ditch In" course in which he was beaten by Stickler. At the next Newmarket meeting on 5 May he finished last of the four runners behind Pepper-pot, Antaeus and Leviathan in the Claret Stakes. In late summer he was sent north to contest the Great Produce Stakes over four miles at York and finished fourth of the five runners behind Mr Dawson's Hippopotamus.

=== 1798: five-year-old season ===
Didelot reappeared in a Subscription Plate on 11 April at the Craven meeting. Running over the six furlong Two Year Old Course he started at odds of 6/1 and finished third of the six runners behind Lord Clermont's filly Hornpipe. The Derby winner's last race came in a running of the Oatland's Stakes at Newmarket on 18 October. Carrying 115 pounds in the handicap over the Bunbury Mile course, he finished third of the seven runners behind the Duke of Grafton's mare Rattle.

== Stud career ==
There is no record of Didelot standing as a stallion in Britain and he had no foals recorded in the General Stud Book. According to one source he was "sent to Russia".

== Pedigree ==
Pedigree of Didelot (GB), bay stallion, 1793
Sire Trumpator (GB) 1782	Conductor; 1767	Matchem	Cade
Sire Trumpator (GB) 1782	Conductor; 1767	Matchem	sister 2 to Miss Partner
Sire Trumpator (GB) 1782	Conductor; 1767	Snap mare	Snap
Sire Trumpator (GB) 1782	Conductor; 1767	Snap mare	Diana
Sire Trumpator (GB) 1782	Brunette; 1771	Squirrel	Traveller
Sire Trumpator (GB) 1782	Brunette; 1771	Squirrel	Grey Bloody Buttocks
Sire Trumpator (GB) 1782	Brunette; 1771	Dove	Matchless
Sire Trumpator (GB) 1782	Brunette; 1771	Dove	Starling mare
Dam Highflyer mare (GB) 1785	Highflyer; 1774	Herod	Tartar
Dam Highflyer mare (GB) 1785	Highflyer; 1774	Herod	Cypron
Dam Highflyer mare (GB) 1785	Highflyer; 1774	Rachel	Blank
Dam Highflyer mare (GB) 1785	Highflyer; 1774	Rachel	Regulus mare
Dam Highflyer mare (GB) 1785	Rockingham's Engineer mare 1771	Engineer	Sampson
Dam Highflyer mare (GB) 1785	Rockingham's Engineer mare 1771	Engineer	Young Greyhound mare
Dam Highflyer mare (GB) 1785	Rockingham's Engineer mare 1771	Regulus mare	Regulus
Dam Highflyer mare (GB) 1785	Rockingham's Engineer mare 1771	Regulus mare	sister to Old Lass of the Mill (Family:2)
