= Sam Day (jockey) =

English jockey (1802–1866)

Sam Day (1802–66) was an English jockey who won The Derby on 3 occasions: in 1821 aboard the grey Gustavus, in 1830 on Priam and once again atop Pyrrhus The First in the 1846 Derby. He also won a 1,000 Guineas / Oaks double in 1846 on Mendicant.

The son of John Day, and brother of John Barham Day, he became apprenticed to a trainer called Cooper, who trained for the Duke of York in Newmarket. After his second Derby win, he retired to a farm near Reading, but when this was not a financial success he wasted back down to 7 stone 12 pounds and, with help from his nephew John, resumed riding. When eventually he retired again, he trained on a small scale at Ascot.

He was one of several horsemen from the Day family, but was reputed to be more honest than other family members. He was described as a cheerful, hardy man and a tough, wiry, elegant rider.

== See also ==
- List of significant families in British horse racing

== Bibliography ==
- Mortimer, Roger; Onslow, Richard; Willett, Peter (1978). Biographical Encyclopaedia of British Racing. London: Macdonald and Jane's. ISBN 0-354-08536-0.
- Wright, Howard (1986). The Encyclopaedia of Flat Racing. London: Robert Hale. ISBN 0-7090-2639-0.
