= Blucher (horse) =

British-bred Thoroughbred racehorse

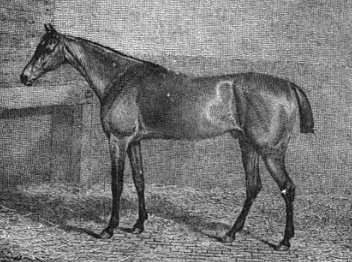
- Blucher in an engraving of 1816 after a painting by James Barenger
- Sire: Waxy
- Grandsire: Pot-8-Os
- Dam: Pantina
- Damsire: Buzzard
- Sex: Stallion
- Foaled: 1811
- Died: 1841 (aged 29–30)
- Country: United Kingdom of Great Britain and Ireland
- Colour: Bay
- Breeder: 2nd Lord Stawell
- Record: 6:5-1-0

Major wins
- Epsom Derby (1814)

Blucher (1811–1841) was a British Thoroughbred racehorse and sire named after the Prussian General Gebhard Leberecht von Blücher, one of the most successful commanders of the Napoleonic Wars, but his name was invariably spelt without the umlaut.

Bred by Lord Stawell, and one of the many notable offspring of the great Waxy (1790–1818), Blucher's first year of racing was triumphant. Between July 1813 and June 1814 he ran five times and was unbeaten, his wins climaxing with The Derby of 1814. After that he had only one further race, at the beginning of the 1815 flat season, in which he placed second. He was then retired to stud at Marelands near Farnham, Surrey.

Blucher had little success as a sire but was an ancestor in the dam's line of the double classic winner Pretender (1866).

== Background ==
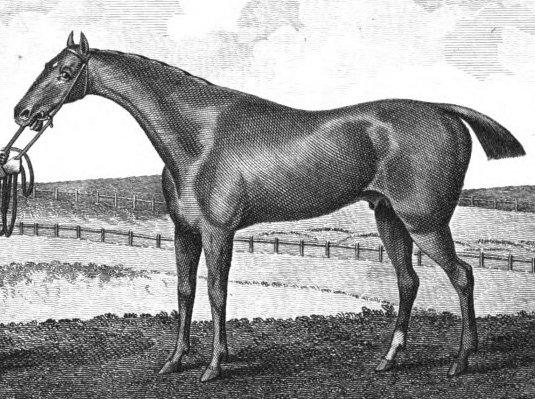
Blucher's sire, Waxy

Blucher was a bay horse bred by Henry Bilson-Legge, 2nd Baron Stawell. His sire was the Derby winner Waxy (1790–1818) and his dam Pantina. Through Waxy, Blucher was descended from the Darley Arabian.

Through his dam, Blucher was twice descended from the noble Herod, the foundation sire through whom the direct male line of the Byerley Turk survives. He was again inbred from Herod through Waxy's dam, Maria, a mare bred by Lord Bolingbroke. Herod was himself inbred from two of the offspring of the Darley Arabian, one of them being the undefeated Flying Childers.

Waxy had won the Derby in 1793 and had continued racing until he was injured as a seven-year-old in 1797, when he retired, going to stud the next year and becoming an influential sire. His offspring included three Derby winners, Whalebone and Whisker as well as Blucher. Waxy's own sire, Pot-8-Os, won thirty-four races during a seven-year racing career. As well as Waxy, Pot-8-Os produced Parasol, the dam of Partisan and Lottery. Waxy's full-brother, Worthy (foaled 1795), had won races and became a breeding stallion for the East India Company.

== Racing career ==
Blucher first ran at the Newmarket Houghton meeting of 1813, winning a fifteen-guineas Sweepstakes handicap for two-year-old colts and fillies. He started as the six to four on favourite in a field of three.

He next ran at the Newmarket Craven meeting of 1814, easily winning a two-hundred guineas Produce Stakes for three-year-old colts and fillies. He started at very short odds of three and four to one on and comfortably beat Vittoria. At the Newmarket first Spring meeting he won the Newmarket Stakes (fifty guineas each), starting at two to one on and again winning easily in a field of nine which included Zadora and Kutusoff. Coming to Epsom, on 26 May he won the 1814 Derby, ridden by William Arnull, one of a famous family of jockeys. Arnull had ridden Derby winners twice before, with Hannibal in 1804 and Octavius in 1812. The Derby of 1814 had a record number of entries, with no fewer than fifty-one. Blucher, who started the favourite at odds of five to two and three to one, narrowly beat a Haphazard colt, the third favourite, who had led from the start and was overtaken only at the very end. Other runners included Bourbon, Grand Duchess, Jeweller, Kutusoff, Monkey, Osman, Robin Adair, Sir Tooley Whagg O'Shaughnashane, Wanderer, Wilmington, and an Eagle colt.

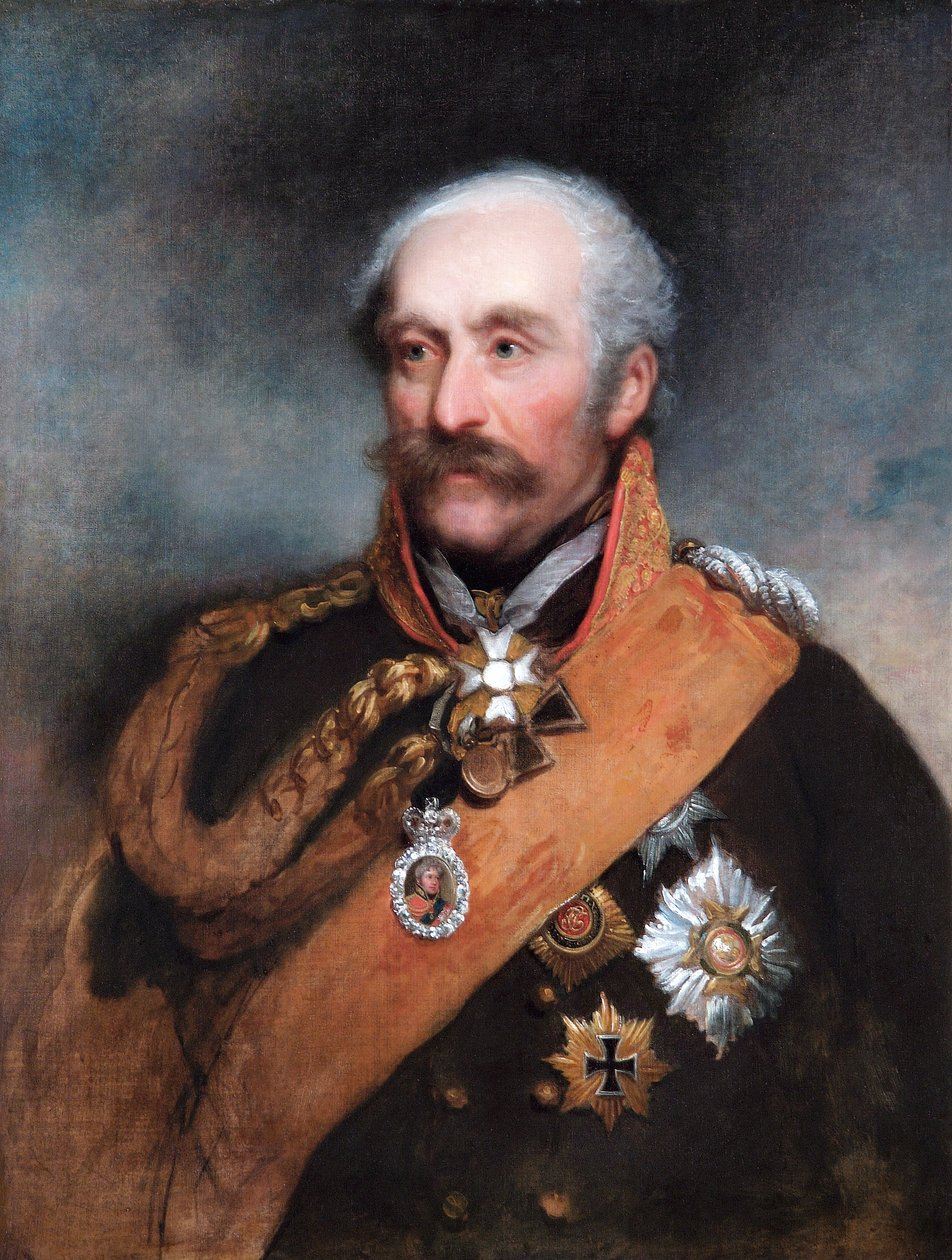
Blücher, the Prussian commander in whose honour Blucher was named

The Derby of 1814, falling on 26 May, came only weeks after the end of the War of the Sixth Coalition, which culminated at the end of March in the capture of Paris by a Coalition army led by Field Marshal Blücher, after whom the horse Blucher had been named, and the abdication of Napoleon Bonaparte on 6 April. In June the Allied sovereigns and their courts made a triumphant visit to England. Those attending the Epsom meeting at which Blucher won the Derby included the King of Prussia and Field Marshal Blücher, and the crowd's rapturous welcome was crowned by Blucher's victory in the main race of the day.

Blucher ran next at Runnymede, Egham, where he won the Magna Charta Stakes of fifty guineas each for three-year-old colts and fillies, starting a very short-odds favourite at four and even five to one on and comfortably beating a Haphazard filly. He had no more outings during the 1814 flat season.

At the Newmarket first spring meeting of 1815, the horse's triumphant unbeaten career came to an end. In the Port Stakes handicap race for all comers, one hundred guineas each, with seven runners, Blucher started as favourite at six to four and five to four on, but was beaten into second place by his half-sister Wire, a three-year-old filly by Waxy out of Penelope. After this defeat Blucher was taken out of training and sent to stud.

Blucher's conqueror, Wire, went on to win many more races. She was soon sold, for three thousand guineas, and her new owner took her to Ireland, where in 1816 she won more prize money than any other horse. She was retired to become an important brood mare at Westport, County Mayo, breeding many winners.

== Sire ==
Following his retirement, Blucher stood as a stallion at Marelands near Farnham, Surrey, priced at ten and a half guineas for a nomination. He had surprisingly little success as a racehorse sire, but on Scheherazade he got the mare Favourite, the dam's dam's dam of the double classic winner Pretender (foaled 1866).

== Pedigree ==
Pedigree of Blucher, bay stallion, 1811
Sire Waxy (GB) Bay, 1790	Potoooooooo; Chestnut, 1773	Eclipse; 1764	Marske
Sire Waxy (GB) Bay, 1790	Potoooooooo; Chestnut, 1773	Eclipse; 1764	Spilletta
Sire Waxy (GB) Bay, 1790	Potoooooooo; Chestnut, 1773	Sportsmistress; 1795	Sportsman
Sire Waxy (GB) Bay, 1790	Potoooooooo; Chestnut, 1773	Sportsmistress; 1795	Golden Locks
Sire Waxy (GB) Bay, 1790	Maria; Bay, 1777	Herod*; 1758	Tartar
Sire Waxy (GB) Bay, 1790	Maria; Bay, 1777	Herod*; 1758	Cypron
Sire Waxy (GB) Bay, 1790	Maria; Bay, 1777	Lisette; 1772	Snap*
Sire Waxy (GB) Bay, 1790	Maria; Bay, 1777	Lisette; 1772	Miss Windsor
Dam Pantina (GB)	Buzzard; 1787	Woodpecker	Herod*
Dam Pantina (GB)	Buzzard; 1787	Woodpecker	Miss Ramsden
Dam Pantina (GB)	Buzzard; 1787	Misfortune	Dux
Dam Pantina (GB)	Buzzard; 1787	Misfortune	Curiosity*
Dam Pantina (GB)	Trentham Mare; 1789	Trentham	Gowers Sweepstakes
Dam Pantina (GB)	Trentham Mare; 1789	Trentham	Miss Herod
Dam Pantina (GB)	Trentham Mare; 1789	Cytherea	Herod*
Dam Pantina (GB)	Trentham Mare; 1789	Cytherea	Lily

* Blucher is inbred 3S x 4D x 4D to the stallion Herod, meaning that he appears third generation once on the sire side of his pedigree, and fourth generation twice on the dam side of his pedigree.

* Blucher is inbred 4S x 5D to the stallion Snap, meaning that he appears fourth generation on the sire side of his pedigree, and fifth generation (via Curiosity) on the dam side of his pedigree.
