= Pretender (horse) =

British-bred Thoroughbred racehorse

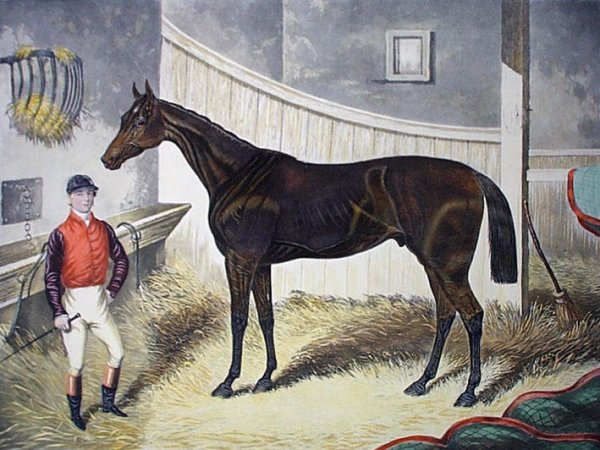
- Pretender, by an unknown artist, circa 1869
- Sire: Adventurer
- Grandsire: Newminster
- Dam: Ferina
- Damsire: Venison
- Sex: Stallion
- Foaled: 1866
- Country: United Kingdom of Great Britain and Ireland
- Colour: Bay or Brown
- Breeder: William Sadler
- Owner: John Johnstone; Robert Jardine
- Trainer: Thomas Dawson
- Record: 15: 5-2-3 (incomplete)

Major wins
- 2000 Guineas (1869); Epsom Derby (1869)

Pretender (1866–1878) was a British Thoroughbred racehorse and sire. After showing promise as a two-year-old in 1868 he improved to become a top class performer in the early part of the following year. He won the 2000 Guineas at Newmarket and The Derby. Pretender was the last horse trained in the North of England to win the Derby until Dante in 1945; no other has won since. He failed to complete the Triple Crown when he was beaten in the St Leger at Doncaster. Pretender’s form subsequently deteriorated and he failed to record any significant wins despite staying in training for two more seasons. He made no impression as a stallion.

== Background ==
Pretender was a bay or brown horse standing 16 hands high bred by William Sadler of Doncaster and sold for 400 guineas as a yearling to the trainer Thomas Dawson, acting on behalf of John Johnstone. Johnstone remained the colt's official owner throughout his career but owned him jointly with Sir Robert Jardine. Pretender was sent into training with Dawson at his stables at Tupgill Park near Middleham, North Yorkshire.

Pretender was from the first crop of foals sired by Adventurer, who won eight races and went on to become a successful stallion, taking the title of Champion sire in 1874. His dam, Ferina, who had previously produced the 2000 Guineas runner-up St. Hubert, was twenty-two years old when Pretender was foaled. After Pretender's birth she was barren and was shot in April 1869, shortly before Pretender's Classic successes.

== Racing career ==
=== 1868: two-year-old season ===
As a two-year-old Pretender ran four times and won twice. The more important of his wins came in the North of England Biennial Stakes at York, a race previously won by Blair Athol. He finished third in the Lambton Plate at Stockton-on-Tees Racecourse. In October, he was sent south for the Middle Park Plate at Newmarket, one of the season's most prestigious races for two-year-olds. He finished third in the £1,000 race behind Pero Gomez and the future 1000 Guineas winner Scottish Queen.

=== 1869: three-year-old season ===
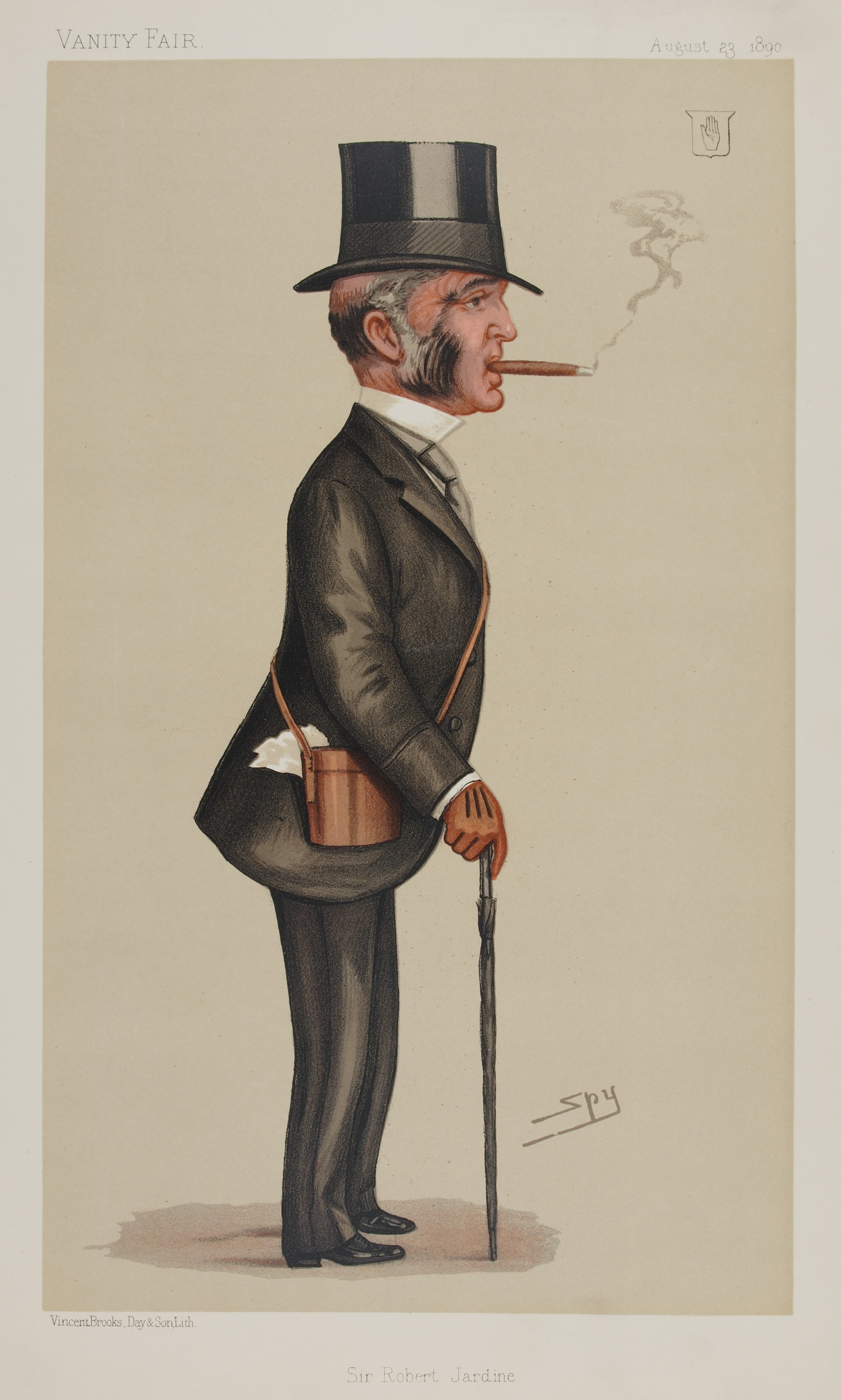
Robert Jardine, Pretender's joint-owner

In early 1869, Pretender was "favourably regarded" as a Derby contender, along with Pero Gomez, Belladrum and Wild Oats. On his three-year-old debut on 27 April, Pretender started 3/1 favourite for the 2000 Guineas, a race for which Pero Gomez was not entered. Ridden by John Osborne he won by half a length from Belladrum. The riding of the runner-up was strongly criticised, with suggestions that some of the biggest bookmakers (the "leviathans") had been involved in his defeat.

Pretender was made the 11/8 favourite for the Derby on 26 May in a field of twenty-two runners. The race attracted the customary large crowd including the Prince and Princess of Wales and foreign dignitaries such as the Nawab of Bengal and the Crown Prince of Denmark. Pretender raced prominently, just behind the pacemakers and turned into the straight in second place. Osborne sent the favourite to the front two furlongs from the finish, just as Pero Gomez was badly hampered in a collision with two other runners. In the final furlong, Pretender turned back a challenge from The Drummer, but was then pressed by John Wells on Pero Gomez who finished very strongly. On the line Pretender prevailed by a short head, although the result was in considerable doubt for several moments until the judge's verdict was announced, and Wells was convinced that he had won. The win was well received, partly on account of the popularity of Osborne, who was winning the race for the first time. After the Derby, Pero Gomez’s owner, Sir Joseph Hawley, attempted to lodge an objection on the grounds that Sadler, Pretender’s original owner, had died, making all the horse’s entries void. Sadler informed the authorities by telegram that he was alive and well, leading to some embarrassment on Hawley’s part.

Pretender won the Great Northern “St Leger” at Stockton in August, but was beginning to show symptoms of the respiratory condition known as Roarer Syndrome, which increasingly prevented him from exerting himself fully. In the St Leger on 15 September he started 5/6 favourite in a field of eleven runners despite rumours that he was not in good form. He was held up in the early stages but could make no progress in the straight and tired in the closing stages to finish fourth, six lengths behind Pero Gomez. In the one and a half mile Doncaster Stakes two days later he was ridden closer to the lead but was again beaten easily by Pero Gomez, finishing second by a length. In October he showed slightly better form to finish second, beaten a neck by the French outsider Boulogne, to whom he was conceding seven pounds in the Newmarket Derby.

=== 1870–1871: later career ===
Pretender stayed in training at four but his “roaring” was becoming more serious and he failed to reproduce his best form. In July 1870 he finished unplaced as a 100/1 outsider in the Stewards' Cup at Goodwood. He ran at the St Leger meeting at Doncaster in September, finishing among the back markers in the Portland Handicap.

At five, Pretender’s form deteriorated further. He ran three times at Goodwood in July, finishing unplaced in the Stewards' Cup, the Chichester Stakes and the Chesterfield Cup.

== Stud career ==
Pretender retired to stand at the Fairfield Stud near York. He failed to attract many mares and was later moved to a stud at Sheffield Lane Paddocks where he stood at a fee of 40 guineas. He failed to produce any runners of consequence before his death in 1878. He was buried at Brecongill near Middleham, where a large stone still marks the spot.

== Pedigree ==
Pedigree of Pretender (GB), bay stallion, 1866
Sire Adventurer (GB) 1859	Newminster; 1848	Touchstone	Camel
Sire Adventurer (GB) 1859	Newminster; 1848	Touchstone	Banter
Sire Adventurer (GB) 1859	Newminster; 1848	Beeswing	Dr Syntax
Sire Adventurer (GB) 1859	Newminster; 1848	Beeswing	Ardrossan mare
Sire Adventurer (GB) 1859	Palma; 1840	Emilius	Orville*
Sire Adventurer (GB) 1859	Palma; 1840	Emilius	Emily
Sire Adventurer (GB) 1859	Palma; 1840	Francesca	Partisan*
Sire Adventurer (GB) 1859	Palma; 1840	Francesca	Orville mare*
Dam Ferina (GB) 1844	Venison; 1833	Partisan*	Walton*
Dam Ferina (GB) 1844	Venison; 1833	Partisan*	Parasol*
Dam Ferina (GB) 1844	Venison; 1833	Fawn	Smolensko
Dam Ferina (GB) 1844	Venison; 1833	Fawn	Jerboa
Dam Ferina (GB) 1844	Partiality; 1830	Middleton	Phantom*
Dam Ferina (GB) 1844	Partiality; 1830	Middleton	Web
Dam Ferina (GB) 1844	Partiality; 1830	Favourite	Blucher
Dam Ferina (GB) 1844	Partiality; 1830	Favourite	Scheherazade (Family: 10)

* Pretender is inbred 4S x 3D to the stallion Partisan, meaning that he appears fourth generation on the sire side of his pedigree, and third generation on the dam side of his pedigree.

* Pretender is inbred 4S x 5S to the stallion Orville, meaning that he appears fourth generation and fifth generation (via Orville mare) on the sire side of his pedigree.

* Pretender is inbred 4D x 5D to the stallion Walton, meaning that he appears fourth generation and fifth generation (via Phantom) on the dam side of his pedigree.
