= Assassin (horse) =

British Thoroughbred racehorse

- Sire: Sweetbriar
- Grandsire: Syphon
- Dam: Angelica
- Damsire: Snap
- Sex: Stallion
- Foaled: 1779
- Country: Kingdom of Great Britain
- Colour: Bay
- Breeder: Lord Egremont
- Owner: Lord Egremont
- Trainer: F. Nealy
- Record: 11: 8–2-1 (incomplete)

Major wins
- Epsom Derby (1782)

Assassin (1779 – c. 1794) was a Thoroughbred racehorse that won the 1782 Epsom Derby. His breeder, Lord Egremont, won the Derby for the first time with Assassin. Assassin raced until he was a five-year-old and was retired to Egremont's stud in Petworth. He was not a successful sire.

== Background ==
Assassin was foaled in 1779, at Lord Egremont's estate Petworth House. Assassin's sire, Sweetbriar, was an undefeated racehorse that earned 5,400 guineas during his racing career for his owner Lord Grosvenor. Sweetbriar stood at Oxcrofts Farm near Balsham. Assassin's dam, Angelica, was foaled in 1761 and was breed by Mr. Shafto, the owner of her sire Snap. Assassin was Angelica's eighth foal and she produced eleven foals between 1768 and 1782, including Assassin's full-sister Medëa. Angelica was euthanised in 1787.

== Racing career ==
Assassin was trained by F. Neale at Newmarket. Assassin raced until he was five-years-old, winning eight races, and was retired to Lord Egremont's stud at Petworth.

=== 1781: two-year-old season ===
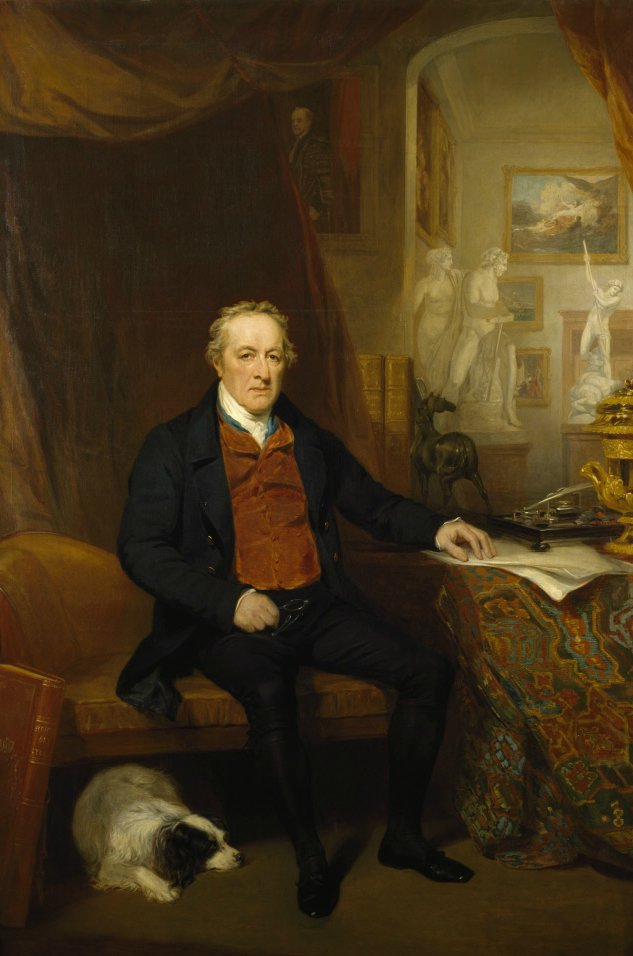
Assassin's Derby win was the first for Lord Egremont, who would go on to win the event four more times.

In October at Newmarket, Assassin beat the Duke of Grafton's colt Puzzle in a match race at 6 to 4 odds against Assassin. Assassin did not win again as a two-year-old. Assassin was second to Plutus in a subscription race at the same meeting, and was second to the filly Ceres in a match race. Assassin forfeited a match race to Plutus at the Houghton meeting.

=== 1782: three-year-old season ===
At the Craven meeting, Assassin received a 70-guinea "compromise" after the colts Brother to Rebel and Recruit backed out of a 200-guinea sweepstakes race. At the First Spring Meeting, Assassin beat Berwick to win a sweepstakes race.

On 9 May at Epsom, Assassin won the Derby, beating Lord Grosvenor's colt Sweet Robin and Charles Bunbury's colt Fortunio. Lord Egremont won the Derby for the first time with Assassin, and won the race four more times with Hannibal in 1804, with Cardinal Beaufort in 1805, with Election in 1807 and with Lap-dog in 1826.

At the July meeting at Newmarket, Assassin beat Mr. Vernon's gelding by Eclipse. At the October meetings in Newmarket, Assassin won a match race against the colt Achilles and forfeited a match race against Dennis O'Kelly's colt Confederate.

=== 1783: four-year-old season ===
At the Craven meeting, Assassin received a forfeiture from the colt Ascot. At the Newmarket spring meeting, Assassin received another forfeiture from the Duke of Cumberland's colt Epaminondas, and a few days later beat the colt and later influential sire Pot-8-Os in a match race. At the Second Spring Meeting in Newmarket, Assassin beat the colt Columbus in a 500-guinea race and beat Heron in a 50-guinea race a few days later.

=== 1784: five-year-old season ===
At the Second Spring Meeting, Assassin was third in a 200-guinea sweepstakes race to Dennis O'Kelly's horse Soldier and Mr. Davis' horse Plutus. Assassin forfeited a match race with the horse Cornwall (later called Boringdon) at the same meeting a few days later, and at the July meeting in Newmarket his owner paid 150 guineas to the owner of Young Eclipse (the 1781 Derby winner) for backing out of a match race.

== Stud career ==
By 1789, Assassin was still standing at Petworth for a fee of two guineas per mare alongside the more expensive stallions Mercury (10 guineas) and Trentham (3 guineas). For the 1793 breeding season, he was relocated to Langley Park near Colnbrook and stood for a fee of 3 guineas per mare and a five shilling groom's fee. His fee at Langley Park was reduced to two guineas for the 1794 season and he did not appear in the register for 1795.

Assassin was not a successful sire. His most notable offspring were the fillies Cow and Rag (foaled in 1786 out of Chanticleer's dam).

== Pedigree ==
Pedigree of Assassin (GB), Bay Colt, 1779
Sire Sweetbriar (GB) Chestnut, 1769	Syphon; 1750	Squirt	Bartlett's Childers*
Sire Sweetbriar (GB) Chestnut, 1769	Syphon; 1750	Squirt	Sister to Old Country Wench
Sire Sweetbriar (GB) Chestnut, 1769	Syphon; 1750	Patriot Mare	Bolton Patriot
Sire Sweetbriar (GB) Chestnut, 1769	Syphon; 1750	Patriot Mare	Crab mare
Sire Sweetbriar (GB) Chestnut, 1769	Shakespeare Mare; 1763	Shakespeare	Hobgoblin
Sire Sweetbriar (GB) Chestnut, 1769	Shakespeare Mare; 1763	Shakespeare	Amorett*^
Sire Sweetbriar (GB) Chestnut, 1769	Shakespeare Mare; 1763	Miss Meredith	Cade^*
Sire Sweetbriar (GB) Chestnut, 1769	Shakespeare Mare; 1763	Miss Meredith	Amorett*^
Dam Angelica Brown, 1761	Snap; 1750	Snip	Flying Childers
Dam Angelica Brown, 1761	Snap; 1750	Snip	Sister to Soreheels
Dam Angelica Brown, 1761	Snap; 1750	Sister to Slipby	Fox
Dam Angelica Brown, 1761	Snap; 1750	Sister to Slipby	Gipsy
Dam Angelica Brown, 1761	Regulus Mare; 1749	Regulus	Godolphin Arabian*
Dam Angelica Brown, 1761	Regulus Mare; 1749	Regulus	Grey Robinson
Dam Angelica Brown, 1761	Regulus Mare; 1749	Childers Mare	Bartlett's Childers*
Dam Angelica Brown, 1761	Regulus Mare; 1749	Childers Mare	Sister One to True Blue

* Assassin is inbred 4S x 5S x 5S x 4D to the stallion Bartlett's Childers, meaning that he appears fourth generation once and fifth generation twice (via Amortett)^ on the sire side of his pedigree, and fourth once generation on the dam side of his pedigree.

* Assassin is inbred 5S x 4D to the stallion Godolphin Arabian, meaning that he appears fifth generation (via Cade)^ on the sire side of his pedigree, and fourth generation on the dam side of his pedigree.
