= William Macdonald (jockey) =

British jockey

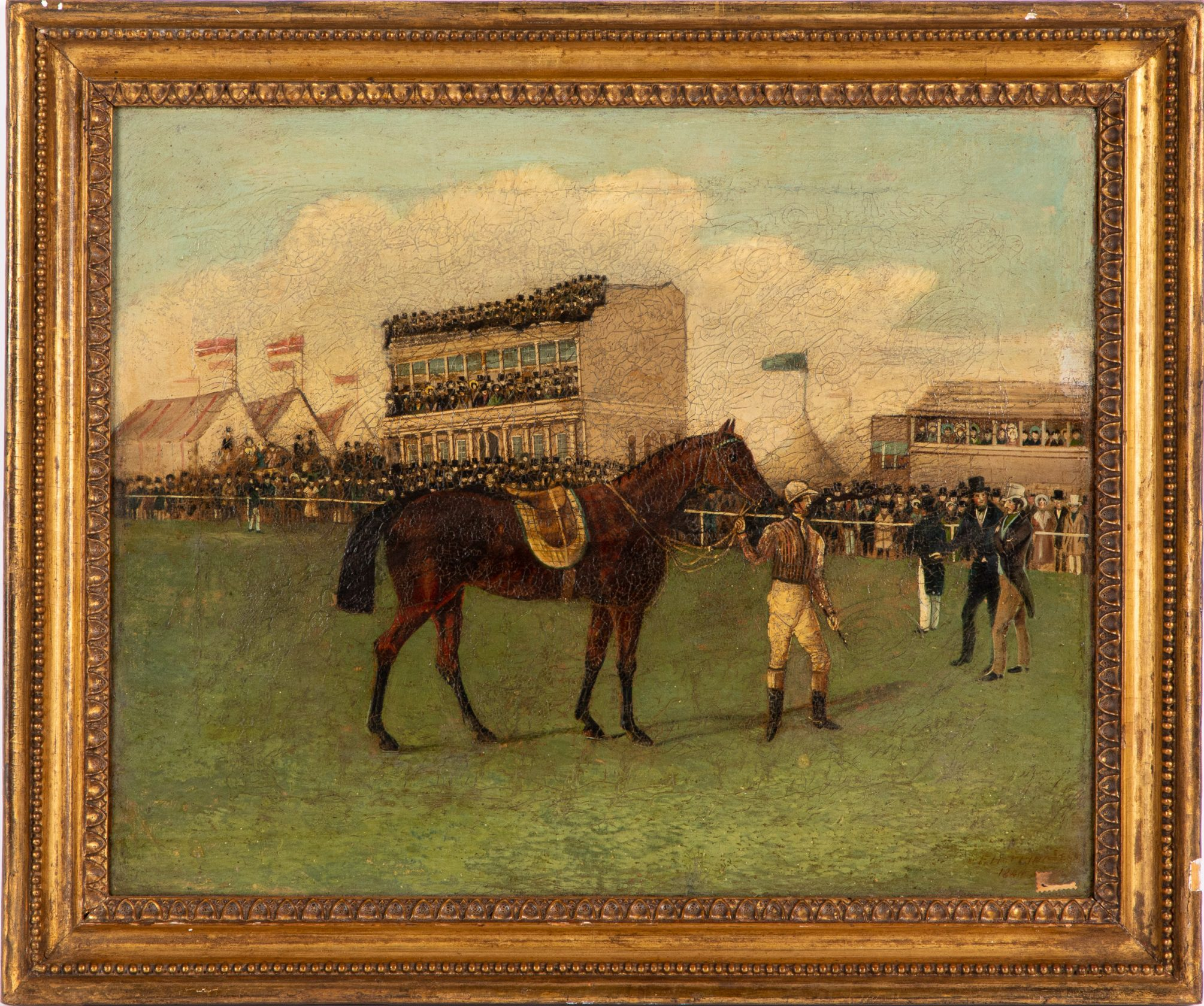
- Little Wonder and Macdonald

Personal information
- Born: 1800
- Died: 1856 (aged 55–56)
- Occupation: Jockey

Horse racing career
- Sport: Horse racing

Major racing wins
- Major races Epsom Derby (1840)

Significant horses
- Little Wonder

William "Mac" Macdonald (1800–1856) was a British jockey who most notably won the 1840 Derby on Little Wonder, a horse that was almost certainly four years old and therefore ineligible for the race.

During the race, the favourite, Launcelot, ridden by Bill Scott, got to the front close to home. As Little Wonder made his challenge, Scott, who had backed Launcelot to win a large sum, called across to Macdonald, "a thousand pounds for you if you stop him!" Macdonald didn't, replying, "too late, Mr Scott, too late." It was to be his only Derby victory and for winning he was presented with a whip by Prince Albert.

He was born in Shoreditch and rode for trainer Samuel Pearce. He married, and later became a trainer himself at Epsom. He also rode in trotting races.

== Major wins ==
(United Kingdom) Great Britain

- Epsom Derby – Little Wonder (1840)

== Bibliography ==
- Tanner, Michael; Cranham, Gerry (1992). Great Jockeys of the Flat. Enfield, Middlesex: Guinness Publishing. ISBN 0-85112-989-7.
