= Jem Snowden =

British jockey

Jim Snowden
Personal information
- Born: c.1844
- Died: c.1889
- Occupation: Jockey

Horse racing career
- Sport: Horse racing

Major racing wins
- Major races Epsom Derby (1864); Epsom Oaks (1860, 1880); St Leger (1864)

Significant horses
- Blair Athol, Butterfly, Jenny Howlet

James (known as "Jim" or "Jem") Snowden was a British Classic winning jockey.

Snowden was a Yorkshireman of gypsy heritage. His parents sold pots and pans from a cart around the Yorkshire Dales, and he learned to ride bareback at gypsy horse fairs.

He spoke in a thick Yorkshire accent, and rarely rode outside the north. His talent was "nearly ethereal" and he was able to ride through gaps before other jockeys had noticed them.

He won his first Classic, the Oaks, aged 17 on Butterfly. He also rode three Classic winners for William l'Anson - the 1864 Derby and St Leger on Blair Athol and the 1880 Oaks on Jenny Howlet. I'Anson rated Snowden as the best jockey he ever saw.

He was a heavy drinker, who followed on from Bill Scott as the heaviest drinker in the north. Sometimes, he was barely able to hold the reins of his horse, and needed other jockeys to prop him up.

Once, he turned up for Chester Races a week late. Another time, at Catterick, he demanded that the hood and blinkers with which his horse Aragon was being fitted be removed, as a "bleend horse and bleend jockey winnet dee [a blind horse and a blind jockey will not do]". The horse won, with a drunk jockey, but without headgear.

On yet another occasion, he was instructed not to win a selling race by more than a neck, so that connections could buy the horse back cheaply. He won by six lengths, and told an intermediary, "thou tell him he ought to think himself lucky to win at all, as I saw five winning posts and didn't know which was the right one!" The effect on him was such that he once vowed he would give £5,000 to be able to stop.

Despite this alcoholism, many of his trainers thought he was a better rider drunk than most of his contemporaries were sober, as the drink did not diminish his courage in the saddle. He was also held in high regard by fellow jockey, Fred Archer. For his part, Snowden was sometimes dismissive of Archer. After beating Archer a head in their first meeting, Snowden said of Archer, "Tha cassn't ride for nuts", and after beating him again at Stockton Racecourse he told Archer, "thee can thell them i' the Sooth that there's mair jockeys in the world than thee."

It is said he was "incoorigable". He died penniless at the age of either 43 or 45. At one point, he claimed to have ridden seven winners at Ayr, but despite seven promises to pay, he received nothing.

== Major wins ==
(United Kingdom) Great Britain

- Epsom Derby - Blair Athol (1864)
- Epsom Oaks - (2) - Butterfly (1860), Jenny Howlet (1880)
- St Leger - Blair Athol (1864)

== Bibliography ==
- Baker, Keith (12 June 2017). The Stakes were High: The Extraordinary Life of John Gully, From Bruiser and Bookie to Fine Old English Gentleman. Pitch Publishing.
- McGrath, Christopher (16 June 2016). Mr Darley's Arabian. Hachette UK.
- Tanner, Michael; Cranham, Gerry (1992). The Guinness book of great jockeys of the flat : a celebration of two centuries of jockeyship. Enfield: Guinness. ISBN 0-85112-989-7.
- Tanner, Michael (2017). The Demon: The Life of George Fordham. Author House.
