= Gustavus (horse) =

British-bred Thoroughbred racehorse

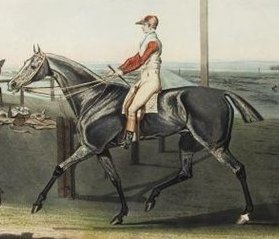
- Gustavus in a painting by Robert Pollard, c. 1821.
- Sire: Election
- Grandsire: Gohanna
- Dam: Lady Grey
- Damsire: Stamford
- Sex: Stallion
- Foaled: 1818
- Country: United Kingdom of Great Britain and Ireland
- Colour: Grey
- Breeder: Prince of Wales
- Owner: Mr. Hunter
- Trainer: Crouch
- Record: 14: 7-4-1

Major wins
- July Stakes (1820); Epsom Derby (1821); Claret Stakes (1822)

Gustavus (1818–1840) was a Thoroughbred racehorse that won the 1821 Epsom Derby. Gustavus was the first grey horse to win the Epsom Derby. He raced until he was four years old and was retired to stud in 1823. Gustavus was exported to Prussia in 1836, at the age of 18. Gustavus was not a successful sire.

== Background ==
Gustavus was foaled in 1818 at the Hampton Court Stud. Gustavus was bred by the Prince Regent and was sired by the 1807 Derby winner Election. Election was a successful racehorse that was bred by the Earl of Egremont and was bought by the Prince of Wales after his racing career to stand at Hampton Court. His dam, Lady Grey, was bred by Colonel Childers at Cantley House in Yorkshire and was one of the Prince's famous "half-dozen grey mares" that were housed at Hampton-Court. Lady Grey's sire, Stamford, was a full-brother to the Epsom Derby winners Paris and Archduke.

In addition to breeding racehorses, the Prince also bred grey Thoroughbreds that would be "sufficiently powerful for his own riding," with Lady Grey purchased specifically for this purpose. Gustavus was a small yearling and the Prince did not think he would be a suitable riding horse. Gustavus was sold to Mr. Hunter for 25 guineas as a yearling. Hunter was reportedly unsatisfied with his purchase and attempted to sell the "shabby little gray" at a loss for 15 guineas, but he could not find a buyer for the colt. Gustavus was retained by Hunter and raced in his name for his entire racing career.

== Racing career ==
Gustavus was trained at Six-Mile Bottom in Newmarket by Crouch. Gustavus first raced as a two-year-old for the July Stakes. The Derby was his most significant win and he raced until he was four years-old, winning seven races in 14 starts. He was retired to stud in 1823.

=== 1820: two-year-old season ===
Gustavus's first career start occurred on 10 July at the July Meeting in Newmarket for the July Stakes. Gustavus won the race by half a length from an unnamed colt by Soothsayer and seven other horses, winning 1,950 guineas. The run for the July Stakes was Gustavus' only start as a two-year-old.

=== 1821: three-year-old season ===
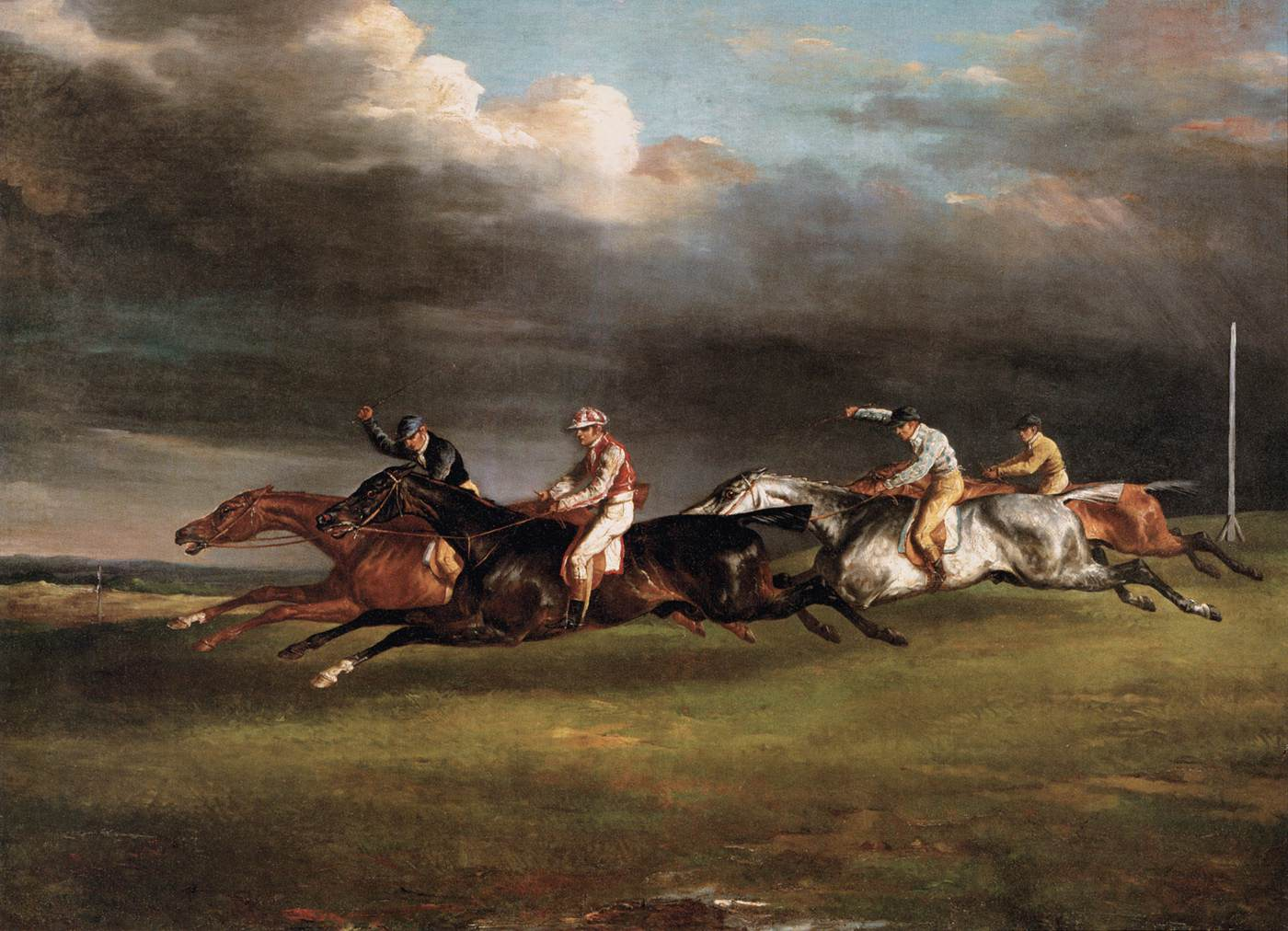
Gustavus (third from left) behind the frontrunner Reginald in the 1821 Epsom Derby in a painting by Théodore Géricault.

At the First Spring Meeting at Newmarket in May, Gustavus won the Newmarket Stakes, beating the colts Tressilian and Fleur de Lis.

In his second start of the season, Gustavus ran in the Derby Stakes at Epsom against a field of twelve other horses. Gustavus was the betting favorite for the running, starting the race with 2 to 1 or 7.5 to 4 odds depending on the bookmaking operation. The Duke of Grafton's colt Reginald (the winner of the 2,000 Guineas Stakes) initially took the lead and "made the running" with Gustavus initiating "some play" with Reginald at Tattenham Corner and the two horses "worked together from end to end in the Derby, as if it was run a match." Gustavus was ridden by Sam Day and Reginald's jockey was Francis Buckle. Buckle's "nerve rather went" while Day "kept close to his girths," allowing Gustavus to overtake Reginald in the final stretch to win the race by half a length. Reginald finished second and the colt Sir Huldibrand third. Day described the finish graphically: "We wound in and out, for all the world like a dog at a fair." Gustavus was the first grey horse to win the Derby and one of only four grey horses to win the event. Hunter reportedly won "a very considerable sum" by betting on Gustavus in the Derby, while two brothers reportedly "lost twenty-six thousand pounds" between them but "handsomely paid the debt" when it was due. The 1821 Derby was portrayed in a painting (right) by French artist Théodore Géricault. The depicted, dramatized scene occurred shortly before the race finish, with Gustavus in third place following closely behind the frontrunner Reginald.

Gustavus was unplaced in the St. Leger Stakes run on 17 September at Doncaster, which was won by the colt Jack Spiggot. A few days later, Gustavus finished second to the filly My Lady in the 1000-guinea Gascoigne Stakes run over the St. Leger course. The third runner and the betting favorite in the race, a colt named Sandbeck, was disqualified after running into a post and falling. At the Houghton meeting on 29 October, Gustavus won a mile-long, 150-guinea match race against Mr. Fox's horse Pancha, and a few days later, Gustavus won 200 guineas after beating Lord Exeter's unnamed colt sired by Androssan in a match race.

=== 1822: four-year-old season ===
At Newmarket-Craven meeting in April, Gustavus won the 1600-guinea Claret Stakes, beating the Duke of Grafton's colt Carbonaro. A few weeks later at the First Spring Meeting, Gustavus finished third in a 100-guinea sweepstakes race to the colts Godolphin and Centaur. Gustavus was beaten in a 6 May match race at Newmarket by Lord Foley's horse Sultan. At the First October Meeting at Newmarket on 30 September, Gustavus finished second to the Duke of Grafton's colt Guerilla in the Trial Stakes. Guerilla won the race by half a length and was an unanticipated winner, with one commenter in the Sporting Magazine stating, "The Trial Stakes, which should have set every body right, set every body wrong." Later the same day, Gustavus beat Lord Egremont's colt Black-and-all-Black in a match race. At the Second October Meeting on 14 October, Gustavus was second in the 50-guinea Post Sweepstakes to the filly Augusta (the winner of the 1821 Epsom Oaks). Two days later in the final start of his racing career, Gustavus was unplaced in the first class of the Oatlands Stakes, the race being won by the filly Whizgig. Gustavus was retired to stud at the end of the racing season.

== Stud career ==
Gustavus was retired to stud in 1823, first standing near Newmarket at the Six-mile Cottage for a fee of eight sovereigns per mare. His fee was increased to 10 guineas for the 1824 breeding season. Gustavus was exported to Prussia in March 1836 at the age of 18 years. Gustavus stood at Baron Maltzahn's stud farm in Kummerow, where Bloomsbury later stood beginning in 1842. Gustavus died in 1840. Gustavus was not a successful sire, with the colt Forester (a July and Newmarket Stakes winner) and the filly Chantilly being his only progeny of note.

== Pedigree ==
Pedigree of Gustavus (GB), Grey Colt, 1818
| Sire Election (GB) Chestnut, 1804 | Gohanna; 1790 | Mercury | Eclipse* |
| Sire Election (GB) Chestnut, 1804 | Gohanna; 1790 | Mercury | Tartar Mare |
| Sire Election (GB) Chestnut, 1804 | Gohanna; 1790 | Dundas Herod Mare | Herod* |
| Sire Election (GB) Chestnut, 1804 | Gohanna; 1790 | Dundas Herod Mare | Maiden |
| Sire Election (GB) Chestnut, 1804 | Chestnut Skim; 1794 | Woodpecker | Herod* |
| Sire Election (GB) Chestnut, 1804 | Chestnut Skim; 1794 | Woodpecker | Miss Ramsden |
| Sire Election (GB) Chestnut, 1804 | Chestnut Skim; 1794 | Milsintowns Herod Mare | Herod* |
| Sire Election (GB) Chestnut, 1804 | Chestnut Skim; 1794 | Milsintowns Herod Mare | Young Hag |
| Dam Lady Grey Grey, 1806 | Stamford; 1794 | Sir Peter Teazle | Highflyer^ |
| Dam Lady Grey Grey, 1806 | Stamford; 1794 | Sir Peter Teazle | Papillon |
| Dam Lady Grey Grey, 1806 | Stamford; 1794 | Horatia | Eclipse* |
| Dam Lady Grey Grey, 1806 | Stamford; 1794 | Horatia | Countess |
| Dam Lady Grey Grey, 1806 | Bourdeaux Mare; 1787 | Bourdeaux | Herod* |
| Dam Lady Grey Grey, 1806 | Bourdeaux Mare; 1787 | Bourdeaux | Cygnet Mare |
| Dam Lady Grey Grey, 1806 | Bourdeaux Mare; 1787 | Prophet Mare | Prophet |
| Dam Lady Grey Grey, 1806 | Bourdeaux Mare; 1787 | Prophet Mare | Virago |

*^ Gustavus is inbred 4S x 4S × 4S x 5D x 4D to the stallion Herod, meaning that he appears fourth generation thrice on the sire side of his pedigree, fifth generation once (via Highflyer)^ on the dam side of his pedigree, and fourth generation once on the dam side of his pedigree.

* Gustavus is inbred 4S × 4D to the stallion Eclipse, meaning that he appears fourth generation on the sire side of his pedigree, and fourth generation on the dam side of his pedigree.
