= Manx Derby =

The Manx Derby was one of the oldest horse races in history. It took place in the Isle of Man. It was organized by the Earl of Derby (then Lord of Mann) on what today is part of Castletown Golf & Country Club

James, the 7th Earl of Derby, Lathom, Lancashire succeeded to the royalty of Mann in 1627 and instituted races in which a cup was to be won.
