= Sam Arnull =

British jockey (c. 1760 – 1800)

Personal information
- Born: c. 1760
- Died: February 1800 Newmarket, Suffolk
- Occupation: Jockey

Horse racing career
- Sport: Horse racing

Major racing wins
- Major races Derby Stakes (1780, 1782, 1787, 1798); Oaks Stakes (1794)

Significant horses
- Assassin, Diomed, Hermione, Sir Harry, Sir Peter Teazle

Sam Arnull (c. 1760 – 1800) was a British flat racing jockey of the 18th century. He won the inaugural running of Britain's foremost flat race, The Derby, on Diomed, one of the most influential horses in Thoroughbred history, and won again on a further three occasions.

== Career ==
Arnull hailed from a family of jockeys that dominated British horse racing in the latter part of the 18th century and early 19th. He was the younger brother of John Arnull and uncle of Bill Arnull. Between them, the family won twelve Derbies in the race's formative years. He himself won four of them – 1780 (Diomed), 1782 (Assassin), 1787 (Sir Peter Teazle), 1798 (Sir Harry) – as well as an Oaks on Hermione in 1794. Such was their dominance that "Newmarket [the home of British racing] without an Arnull would ... have seemed strange"

Sam was described as a "quiet and unassuming man" and was a man of some means, being able to ride out at hunts on well-turned out horses, with a well-dressed groom. He and his family were known for being more trustworthy than other jockeys of the day.

Although his brother won more Derbies, Sam was perhaps the better of the two; when he died in 1800 he "is supposed not to have left a better" His dedication to the sport was certainly undoubted. For example, in spite of the fact he found that "wasting was a sore burden ... [he] performed the unrivalled feat of knocking off 7 lbs in a single day" to meet the weight for a horse he wanted to ride.

=== 1780 Derby ===
The inaugural running of the Derby was low key compared to the event which it was to become. At the time it merited but a small notice in the London Evening Post of 6 May 1780 but in retrospect was said to have "fairly caught hold on the public imagination".

Arnull is said to have been seen going to post wearing:

a black velvet 'cap with a long French peak, and a bow of black satin riband behind long hair falling to the shoulders, a white cambric handkerchief, in ample folds, tied at the back; a long body coat with flaps, wide skirts opening at the sides as well as before and behind knee-breeches strapped just below the knee white cotton stockings, Oxford shoes and silver buckles

His main rival in the race was Colonel O'Kelly's Boudrow, also recorded as Budroo, who came in second. Diomed, owned by Sir Charles Bunbury, won at odds of 6/4. The breeches that Arnull wore on the day now hang inside the Jockey Club.

At Nottingham the following year, suspicion turned on Arnull when Diomed lost to what was considered "a very far inferior horse", losing Bunbury a large sum of money. The defeat sickened Bunbury and was a factor in Diomed's retirement.

== Death ==
Arnull died in Newmarket in 1800. His death notice declared that "he is supposed not to leave a better behind him."

== Major wins ==
(United Kingdom) Great Britain

- Epsom Derby – (4) – Diomed (1780), Assassin (1782), Sir Peter Teazle (1787), Sir Harry (1798)
- Epsom Oaks – Hermione (1794)

== See also ==
- List of significant families in British horse racing

== Bibliography ==
- Mortimer, Roger; Onslow, Richard; Willett, Peter (1978). Biographical Encyclopaedia of British Racing. London: Macdonald and Jane's. ISBN 0-354-08536-0.
- Tanner, Michael; Cranham, Gerry (1992). Great Jockeys of the Flat. Enfield, Middlesex: Guinness Publishing. ISBN 0-85112-989-7.
- Thompson, Laura (2000). Newmarket: from James I to the present day. London: Virgin Books. ISBN 978-1-85227-853-3.
