= James Barenger =

English painter

James Barenger (1780–1831) was an English animal painter and illustrator.

== Life ==
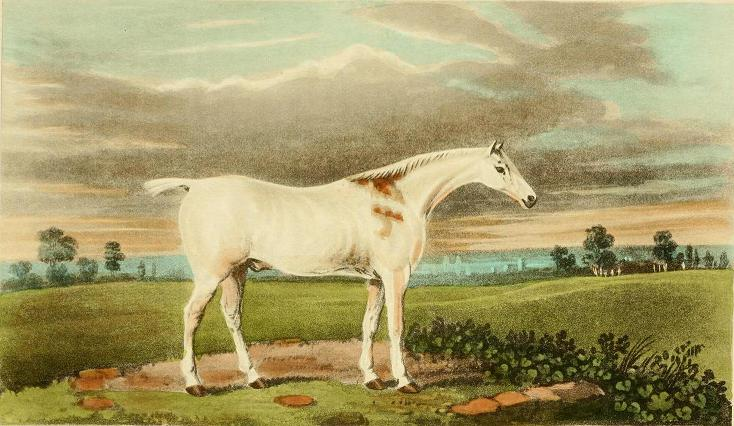
Claret, a hunter (1822)

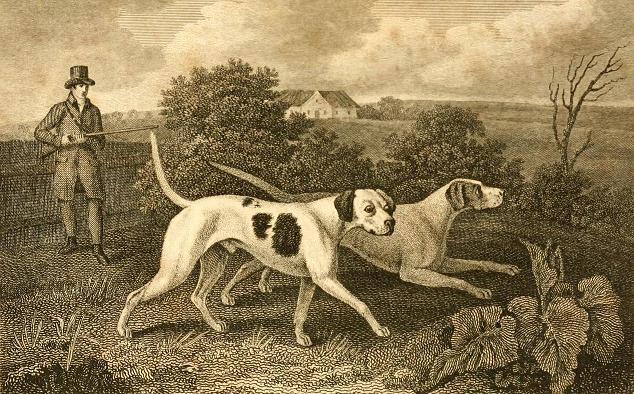
Pointers going out with sportsmen (engraving by John Scott after Barenger)

Barenger was born in Kentish Town, London, the son of James Barenger Snr., a metal chaser and artist who exhibited paintings of insects at the Society of Artists and Royal Academy, and Sarah Woollett, the daughter of the engraver, William Woollett. His brother Samuel Barenger (christened Major Samuel Barenger) also became an engraver.

Beginning as a landscape artist, Barenger went on to specialise in painting horses, dogs and other animals, and hunting scenes. In 1807, at the age of 28, he exhibited at the Royal Academy for the first time. At this stage, he was living with his father in Kentish Town, but later moved to Camden Town. He went on to exhibit 48 paintings at the Royal Academy and eight at the British Institution.

He acquired numerous wealthy and aristocratic patrons, and his pictures were also engraved for sporting publications such as W. H. Scott's British Field Sports, The Sporting Repository, The Annals of Sporting and The Sporting Magazine. For the last of these, Scott engraved Barenger's painting of the racehorse Blucher (ca. 1814).

As well as painting, Barenger also bred pointer dogs. He died on 1 October 1831 and was buried in Old St Pancras churchyard.
