= Claret Stakes =

Horse race in England

- Class: Horse
- Location: Ditch-In course Newmarket, England
- Inaugurated: 1808
- Race type: Flat / Thoroughbred

Race information
- Distance: 2 miles 9 yards (3,229 metres)
- Surface: Turf
- Qualification: Four-year-olds

The Claret Stakes was a flat horse race in Great Britain open to four-year-olds. It was run on the Ditch-In course at Newmarket over a distance of 2 miles (3,218 metres), and was scheduled to take place each year in early or mid April at the Craven meeting. The Ditch-In course had a six furlong uphill finish and was considered more testing then the Two Middle Miles course, over which the similar Port Stakes was run.

== Winners to 1841 ==
Year	Winner	Jockey	Trainer	Owner	Odds
1808	Musician			3rd Duke of Grafton	5/1
1809	Vandyke			3rd Duke of Grafton	8/11
1810	Britannia			Mr Lake	10/1
1811	Crispin			Mr Payne	12/1
1812	Rainbow			General Gower	20/1
1813	Comus			Sir John Shelley	2/1
1815	Bourbon			Lord George Cavendish	evens
1816	St Sebastian			Lord Grosvenor	11/8
1817	Bobadil			Mr Goddard
1818	The Student			James Udney
1819	Allegro			Lord George Cavendish
1820	Banker			Duke of York
1821	Emmeline			5th Duke of Rutland
1822	Gustavus		Crouch	Hunter
1823	Moses		William Butler	Greville
1824	no race	n/a	n/a	n/a	n/a
1825	no race	n/a	n/a	n/a	n/a
1826	Chateau Margaux			Wyndham
1827	Dervise		Robert Robson	4th Duke of Grafton
1828	Rapid Rhone			Cavendish
1829	Zinganee		William Chifney	William Chifney
1830	Sir Hercules			2nd Baron Langford
1831	Amphiarus			Duke of Portland
1832	Camarine		H Scott	Sir Mark Wood
1833	Trustee			Duke of Portland
1834	Glaucus			Lord Chesterfield
1835	no race	n/a	n/a	n/a	n/a
1836	no race	n/a	n/a	n/a	n/a
1837	no race	n/a	n/a	n/a	n/a
1838	Mango			Greville
1839	no race	n/a	n/a	n/a	n/a
1840	Euclid			Thomas Thornhill
