= Hannibal (horse) =

British Thoroughbred racehorse

- Sire: Driver (Egremont's)
- Grandsire: Trentham
- Dam: Fractious
- Damsire: Mercury
- Sex: Stallion
- Foaled: 1801
- Country: United Kingdom
- Colour: Bay
- Breeder: Lord Egremont
- Owner: Lord Egremont
- Trainer: F. Neale
- Record: 5:1-2-2

Major wins
- Epsom Derby (1804)

Hannibal (1801 – c. 1806) was a Thoroughbred racehorse that won the 1804 Epsom Derby. Hannibal raced until he was four-years-old, winning only one race over his two-year racing career. His breeder, Lord Egremont, won the Derby five times and Hannibal's victory was his third time winning the event. Hannibal retired from racing in 1806 and had a limited stud career, covering few mares and standing for only the 1806 breeding season at Lord Egremont's stud in Petworth.

== Background ==
Hannibal was foaled in 1801 at Lord Egremont's estate Petworth House. Egremont's Driver, Hannibal's sire, was bred by Lord Egremont and was described as a "tolerable runner." Hannibal's dam, Fractious (foaled in 1792), was also bred by Lord Egremont. Hannibal was Fractious' fourth foal and one of seven by Driver. Fractious produced fifteen foals between 1798 and 1816. Fractious is present in the female-line of the influential broodmare Pocahontas and was her fifth-dam through Fractious' daughter Amazon.

== Racing career ==
Hannibal did not race as a two-year-old, and his first race was in the 1804 Epsom Derby. Hannibal was trained by F. Neale at Newmarket. In his career, he started five times, winning only the Derby.

=== 1804: three-year-old season ===
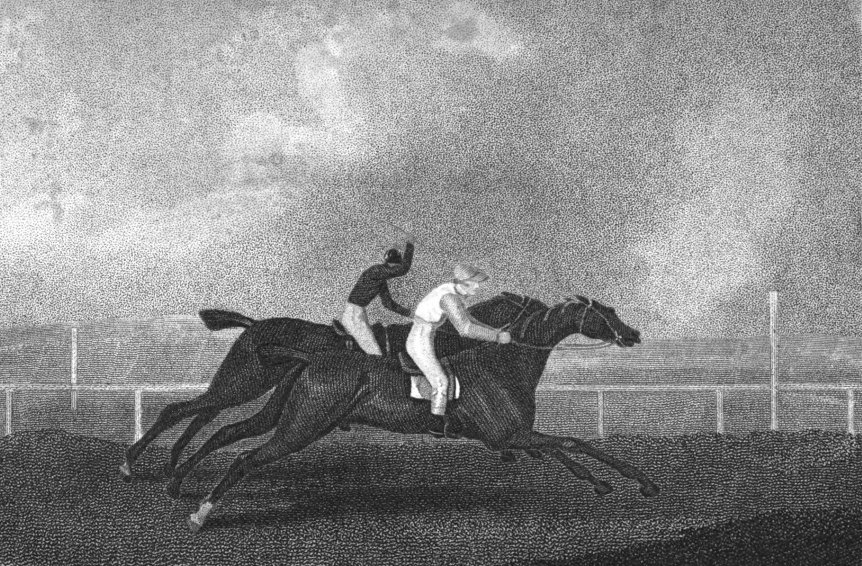
Sancho (foreground) leading Hannibal in a 26 July 1805 match race held at Brighton. This was the last start of Hannibal's racing career.

Hannibal's first start was in The Derby held on 17 May with a field of eight horses. Hannibal started at 3 to 1 odds and won the 1650-guinea race, with Mr. Wilson's colt by Waxy second and Mr. Dawson's colt Hippocampus third. Lord Egremont won the Derby for the second time with Hannibal, having won in 1782 with Assassin. He won the Derby three more times, with Cardinal Beaufort the next year, Election in 1807 and with Lap-dog in 1826.

At Ascot in June, Hannibal received a 50-guinea forfeiture from Mr. Warrington after his colt by Guildford withdrew from a match race. Hannibal was third in the Pavilion Stakes held at Brighthelmston on 28 July, losing to the colt Enterprise and a colt by Waxy. Hannibal was beaten by Hippocampus a few days later in a 650-guinea sweepstakes race whilst carrying seven more pounds than Hippocampus as a handicap for his Derby win.

=== 1805: four-year-old season ===
Hannibal ran twice in 1805. At the First Spring meeting in Newmarket in April, Hannibal finished third in the New Claret Stakes losing to Lord Darlington's colt Pavilion and Mr. Mellish's colt Sancho. In the last start of his career on 26 July at Brighton, Hannibal participated in a match race against Mr. Mellish's colt Sancho. The odds were 11 to 10 against Hannibal for the 1,000-guinea race. Sancho was ridden by Francis Buckle and quickly took the lead in the mile-long race, winning easily and was never challenged by Hannibal in the race. The running was described as "a great betting race" and an engraving of the match (right) was commissioned from a painting by John Nott Sartorius and published in Volume 28 of the Sporting Magazine.

== Season at stud ==
Hannibal retired from racing at the end of the 1805 season and was listed in the Racing Calendar as a breeding stallion for the 1806 season (from 1 February to 14 July) at Lord Egremont's Petworth House stud. At Petworth, he stood for a 5-guinea per mare stud fee and 1-guinea groom's fee alongside the stallions Gohanna, Bobtail and Brother to Driver. Hannibal does not appear in the 1807 stallion register for Petworth or any other stud farm, suggesting that he died early in the 1806 breeding season or was sold for other purposes.

The General Stud Book reports Hannibal covering only three mares in 1806: Martha, Lord Grosvenor's mare Ariadne and Quiz (full-sister to Wowski, Smolensko's dam) before Ariadne and Quiz were sent to the West Indies. The only foal recorded for Hannibal in the General Stud Book is the chestnut filly, Hannah, produced by Martha (by Woodpecker) in 1807. Hannah raced until she was four-years-old, winning several races. Hannah by Hannibal does not appear in subsequent editions of the General Stud Book and does not appear to have produced any registered offspring. Carthaginian, who was later gelded, was another of Hannibal's offspring that also raced, but his dam was not identified in the racing literature and he does not appear in the General Stud Book.

== Pedigree ==
Pedigree of Hannibal (GB), Bay Colt, 1801
| Sire Driver (Egremont's) (GB) Brown, 1783 | Trentham; 1766 | Gowers Sweepstakes | Gower Stallion |
| Sire Driver (Egremont's) (GB) Brown, 1783 | Trentham; 1766 | Gowers Sweepstakes | Brown Crofts |
| Sire Driver (Egremont's) (GB) Brown, 1783 | Trentham; 1766 | Miss South | South |
| Sire Driver (Egremont's) (GB) Brown, 1783 | Trentham; 1766 | Miss South | Young Cartouch Mare |
| Sire Driver (Egremont's) (GB) Brown, 1783 | Coquette; 1765 | Compton Barb | Unknown |
| Sire Driver (Egremont's) (GB) Brown, 1783 | Coquette; 1765 | Compton Barb | Unknown |
| Sire Driver (Egremont's) (GB) Brown, 1783 | Coquette; 1765 | Sister to Regulus | Godolphin Arabian |
| Sire Driver (Egremont's) (GB) Brown, 1783 | Coquette; 1765 | Sister to Regulus | Grey Robinson |
| Dam Fractious Bay, 1792 | Mercury; 1778 | Eclipse* | Marske |
| Dam Fractious Bay, 1792 | Mercury; 1778 | Eclipse* | Spilletta |
| Dam Fractious Bay, 1792 | Mercury; 1778 | Tartar Mare | Tartar |
| Dam Fractious Bay, 1792 | Mercury; 1778 | Tartar Mare | Sister to Mogul Mare |
| Dam Fractious Bay, 1792 | Woodpecker Mare; 1785 | Woodpecker | Herod |
| Dam Fractious Bay, 1792 | Woodpecker Mare; 1785 | Woodpecker | Miss Ramsden |
| Dam Fractious Bay, 1792 | Woodpecker Mare; 1785 | Everlasting | Eclipse* |
| Dam Fractious Bay, 1792 | Woodpecker Mare; 1785 | Everlasting | Hyaena |

* Hannibal is inbred 3D x 4D to the stallion Eclipse, meaning that he appears third and fourth generation on the dam side of his pedigree.
