= Election (horse) =

British Thoroughbred racehorse

- Sire: Gohanna
- Grandsire: Mercury
- Dam: Chestnut Skim
- Damsire: Woodpecker
- Sex: Stallion
- Foaled: 1804
- Country: United Kingdom of Great Britain and Ireland
- Colour: Chestnut
- Breeder: Lord Egremont
- Owner: Lord Egremont
- Trainer: Francis Neale
- Record: 22:17-3-0

Major wins
- Epsom Derby (1807)

Honours
- Leading sire in Great Britain and Ireland (1825)

Election (1804 – June 1821) was a Thoroughbred racehorse that won the 1807 Epsom Derby. His breeder, Lord Egremont, won the Derby for the fourth time with Election. Election raced until he was seven years old and was bought by the Prince Regent after his racing career. He was a successful sire for the Prince's Hampton Court Stud, producing the 1821 Derby winner Gustavus, the 1817 2,000 Guineas Stakes winner Manfred and 1825 1,000 Guineas Stakes winner Tontine.

== Background ==
Election, described as "one of the smallest and most delicate" of his sire's offspring, was foaled in 1804 at Lord Egremont's estate Petworth House. His dam, Chestnut Skim, was bred by Lord Egremont and produced nine foals between 1802 and 1817. Election was her third foal and one of six sired by Gohanna. Full-siblings to Election include the colt Prodigal and the fillies Bribery and the Gohanna Mare (the grandam of Frederick and Cedric). Chestnut Skim was extremely inbred due to her sire and dam being half-siblings sired by Herod. Election was trained by F. Neale at Newmarket.

== Racing career ==
=== 1807: three-year-old season ===
Election's first and only start as a three-year-old was for the Derby Stakes held on 14 May at Epsom Downs Racecourse. Thirteen horses participated in the running out of the original 38 subscribers to the race. At the start, Mr. Wilson's colt Sir Solomon took the lead and was the pace-setter for much of the race until the final stretch. Sir Solomon was passed by Mr. Lake's colt Coriolanus near the finish with Election "immediately after" taking the lead and winning the race by a length. The running was described as a "very fine race." Sir Solomon finished second and Mr. Lake's colt Coriolanus (also sired by Gohanna) was third. Election was ridden "with masterly style" by John Arnold of Newmarket, who was an older gentleman, as he died at an "advanced age" four years later.

=== 1808: four-year-old season ===
In his first start of 1808, Election won the 60-guinea Ladies' Plate held at Goodwood in May, winning two two-mile heats and beating the colt Epsom. Another horse, an aged gelding named Tom Pipes, also participated but was disqualified after his jockey "mistook" or ran the wrong course during the first heat of the race. On 22 June at Ascot, Election won the Swinley Stakes, beating Mr. Fermor's colt Stripling with betting odds of 2 to 1 and 5 to 2 against Election. Election won the 100-guinea His Majesty's Plate at Lewes in August, beating Mr. Daly's colt Bob Booty in a set of two-mile heats. Election won the first heat and ran a dead heat with Bob Booty in the final heat. The next day at the same meeting, Election ran against Bob Booty for a second time in the 60-guinea Ladies' Plate, beating him in the four-mile race. At the First October Meeting at Newmarket, Election won the 100-guinea His Majesty's Plate, beating the colts Rambler and Snug. At the Second October Meeting, Election started in the first class of the Oatlands Stakes against five other horses, including the horse Hambletonian. He finished first, with Lord Foley's colt Weaver second and Hambletonian third. In his last start of the season, Election was handed his first defeat at the Houghton meeting in November when Lord Sackville's horse Deceiver beat Election in a mile-long match race.

=== 1809: five-year-old season ===
In April at the Craven meeting, Election was unplaced in the first class of the Oatlands Stakes, losing to the colt Bacchanal, the filly Nymphina, the horse Sir David and the filly May. A few days later, Election was also unplaced a £50 subscription plate, won by the filly Agnes. Election did not race again until July, when he won the Petworth Stakes at Brighton by beating the mare Nymphina. In his final start of the season, Election won the 100-guinea His Majesty's Plate at Lewes on 27 July, beating the colts Sunbeam and Hippomenes. A few days later, Election walked over for the Ladies Plate due to the injury of jockey Francis Buckle who was supposed to ride the challenging horse Bacchanal. Buckle was seriously injured immediately after running (and winning) a race for hack horses, after his mount Swingbar collided in succession with a carriage and a man on horseback that had mistakenly crossed the track. With no jockey except "those over weight" to ride Bacchanal, Election was declared the winner.

=== 1810: six-year-old season ===
In his first start of the season, Election walked over for the Ladies' Plate at Goodwood on 1 June. On 12 June at the Guildford meeting, Election won both heats of the King's Plate "cleverly" from Mr. Dilly's horse Gnat-Ho!, who carried two extra pounds than Election in both four-mile heats. Election was entered in the £100 Plate at Brighton, which was supposed to be run on Friday, 27 July, but due to "one of the greatest storms ever witnessed at Brighton" the running was postponed to the following day. Election beat Mr. Ladbroke's horse Guardy who "bolted" in the four-mile race. On 2 August at Lewes, Election won the 100-guinea King's Plate against the horse Discount, winning both four-mile heats. The next day, Election again was pitted against Mr. Ladbroke's horse Guardy in a 100-guinea sweepstakes race, winning the race after Guardy again "bolted" in the race. On 4 August, Election walked over for the four-mile, 60-guinea Ladies' Plate.

=== 1811: seven-year-old season ===
On 1 June at the Guildford meeting, Election walked over for the King's Purse. At Lewes on 1 August, Election lost the 100-guinea King's Plate to the four-year-old colt Wildboy. Election won the first heat "with much difficulty," was second in the second heat and was disqualified in the deciding heat due to falling during the running. The next day, Election was second, and last, in the Ladies' Plate to the horse Scorpion who "won easy."

== Stud career ==
Election was retired to stud in 1812 and first stood at the Royal Stud at Hampton-court for a fee of 10 guineas per mare. Election died in June 1821 at Euston Hall of "inflammation." He proved to be a successful stallion, with his progeny including the Classic winning colts Manfred (2000 Guineas) and Gustavus (Derby). Four years after his death he was Champion sire in the year that his daughter Tontine won the 1,000 Guineas.

== Sire line tree ==
- Election
  - Manfred
  - Regent
  - Gustavus
    - Forester
    - Young Gustavus
  - Manzeppa
  - Rufus

== Pedigree ==
Pedigree of Election (GB), Chestnut Colt, 1804
Sire Gohanna (GB) Chestnut, 1790	Mercury; 1778	Eclipse	Marske
Sire Gohanna (GB) Chestnut, 1790	Mercury; 1778	Eclipse	Spilletta
Sire Gohanna (GB) Chestnut, 1790	Mercury; 1778	Tartar Mare	Tartar*^
Sire Gohanna (GB) Chestnut, 1790	Mercury; 1778	Tartar Mare	Sister to Mogul Mare
Sire Gohanna (GB) Chestnut, 1790	Dundas Herod Mare; 1778	Herod*	Tartar*^
Sire Gohanna (GB) Chestnut, 1790	Dundas Herod Mare; 1778	Herod*	Cypron
Sire Gohanna (GB) Chestnut, 1790	Dundas Herod Mare; 1778	Maiden	Matchem^
Sire Gohanna (GB) Chestnut, 1790	Dundas Herod Mare; 1778	Maiden	Pratts Old Mare
Dam Chestnut Skim Chestnut, 1794	Woodpecker; 1773	Herod*	Tartar*^
Dam Chestnut Skim Chestnut, 1794	Woodpecker; 1773	Herod*	Cypron
Dam Chestnut Skim Chestnut, 1794	Woodpecker; 1773	Miss Ramden	Cade*^
Dam Chestnut Skim Chestnut, 1794	Woodpecker; 1773	Miss Ramden	Lonsdale Mare
Dam Chestnut Skim Chestnut, 1794	Milsintowns Herod Mare; 1780	Herod*	Tartar*^
Dam Chestnut Skim Chestnut, 1794	Milsintowns Herod Mare; 1780	Herod*	Cypron
Dam Chestnut Skim Chestnut, 1794	Milsintowns Herod Mare; 1780	Young Hag	Skim
Dam Chestnut Skim Chestnut, 1794	Milsintowns Herod Mare; 1780	Young Hag	Hag

* Election is inbred 3S × 3D x 3D to the stallion Herod, meaning that he appears third generation once on the sire side of his pedigree and third generation twice on the dam side of his pedigree.

* Election is inbred 4S × 4S x 4D x 4D to the stallion Tartar, meaning that he appears fourth generation twice on the sire side of his pedigree and fourth generation twice on the dam side of his pedigree.

*^ Election is inbred 5S x 4D to the stallion Cade, meaning that he appears fifth generation (via Matchem)^ on the sire side of his pedigree and fourth generation on the dam side of his pedigree.
