= Charlotte West (horse) =

British-bred Thoroughbred racehorse

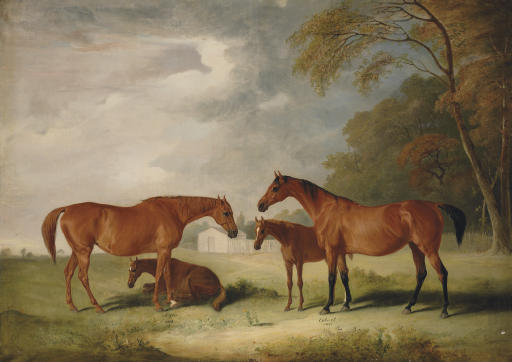
- Filigree and her Daughter Cobweb, with Foals in a Landscape by John Ferneley c. 1827. The foal on the ground is probably Charlotte West
- Sire: Tramp
- Grandsire: Dick Andrews
- Dam: Filagree
- Damsire: Soothsayer
- Sex: Mare
- Foaled: 1827
- Country: United Kingdom
- Colour: Chestnut
- Breeder: George Child Villiers, 5th Earl of Jersey
- Owner: 5th Earl of Jersey
- Trainer: John Edwards
- Record: 7:4-1-1

Major wins
- 1000 Guineas (1830); Royal Stakes (1830)

Charlotte West (1827 – after 1850) was a British Thoroughbred racehorse and broodmare who won the seventeenth running of the classic 1000 Guineas at Newmarket Racecourse in 1830. In a racing career which lasted from April 1830 until May 1831 the filly ran seven times and won four races. After winning the 1000 Guineas on her second racecourse appearance, Charlotte West was beaten when favourite for the Oaks Stakes but returned to win races at Ascot and Newmarket before the end of the year. She failed to reproduce her best form in 1831 and was retired from racing.

== Background ==
Charlotte West was a chestnut mare bred by her owner George Child Villiers, 5th Earl of Jersey. She was sired by the Yorkshire-bred stallion Tramp, a successful racehorse and sire whose other progeny included The Derby winners St. Giles and Dangerous as well as the filly Tarantella, the winner of the 1000 Guineas in 1833.

Charlotte West descended from a successful line of broodmares tracing back to Prunella, a broodmare owned by the Duke of Grafton. Her dam, Filagree, also produced Riddlesworth, winner of the 2000 Guineas, and Cobweb, who won the 1000 Guineas and the Oaks before producing three Classic winners, including Bay Middleton. Filagree was a daughter of Web, the foundation mare of Thoroughbred family 1-s, and a sister of Derby winner Middleton and broodmare Trampoline.[1]

== Racing career ==
=== 1830: three-year-old season ===
Charlotte West began her racing career on 15 April 1830 at the Newmarket Craven meeting. Ridden by James "Jem" Robinson she ran a match race against a colt named Coventry over the Ditch Mile. The colt was favoured in the betting, but the filly won to win a prize of £200. Two weeks later, Lord Jersey's filly was one of seven fillies to contest the 1000 Guineas Stakes over the same course and distance and started at odds of 5/1 behind the 3/1 joint-favourites Brambilla and Zillah. Partnered again by Robinson, Charlotte West won the classic by a length from Zillah, with Brambilla in third place. According to the Sporting Calendar she won "rather decidedly" after a "business-like" race.

A month after her win at Newmarket, Charlotte West was moved up in distance for the Oaks Stakes over one and a half miles at Epsom. In a field of eighteen runners, she was made 3/1 favourite but finished unplaced behind Mr Scott Stonehewer's filly Variation, a 28/1 outsider. Charlotte West returned to the one mile distance at Ascot in June for the Royal Stakes. She started at odds of 1/4 and won by two lengths from her only opponent, a filly named Schumla. The runner-up lost any chance of creating an upset when she ran wide on the turn into the straight after being distracted by the presence of her trainer, mounted on his hack on the outside of the course.

Charlotte West was off the course for almost five months before returning on 6 November, the last day of racing at Newmarket in 1830. She was assigned top weight of 126 pounds in a five furlong handicap race in which she was matched against colts and older horses. She was ridden by George Edwards, and started the 5/2 favourite, whilst her main rival, Mr Rush's unnamed colt by Tiresias out of Rhoda was ridden by Jem Robinson. Charlotte West won by a head from the Rhoda colt, with Edwards reportedly riding a particularly fine race.

=== 1831: four-year-old season ===
Charlotte West was kept in training as a four-year-old but failed to reproduce her earlier success. At the First Spring meeting at Newmarket on 18 April she started 6/5 favourite for a five furlong handicap, but finished third of the four runners behind Mr Cooke's colt Harold. At the next Newmarket meeting in May she ran a £50 match against Zillah in which she attempted to concede five pounds to the 1000 Guineas runner-up. Charlotte West was favoured in the betting but beaten in the race and did not compete again.

== Stud record ==
After her retirement, Charlotte West became a broodmare and produced fourteen live foals between 1833 and 1850 during which time she changed hands several times. Although she was covered by stallions including the classic winners Cotherstone, Touchstone, The Colonel and Elis she produced no top-class winners. After 1850 her owner abandoned attempts to use the mare for breeding Thoroughbreds and she was "put to cart-horses".

== Pedigree ==
Pedigree of Charlotte West (GB), chestnut mare, 1827
Sire Tramp (GB) 1810	Dick Andrews; 1797	Joe Andrews	Eclipse
Sire Tramp (GB) 1810	Dick Andrews; 1797	Joe Andrews	Amaranda
Sire Tramp (GB) 1810	Dick Andrews; 1797	Highflyer mare	Highflyer
Sire Tramp (GB) 1810	Dick Andrews; 1797	Highflyer mare	Cardinal Puff mare
Sire Tramp (GB) 1810	Gohanna mare 1803	Gohanna	Mercury
Sire Tramp (GB) 1810	Gohanna mare 1803	Gohanna	Dundas' Herod mare
Sire Tramp (GB) 1810	Gohanna mare 1803	Fraxinella	Trentham
Sire Tramp (GB) 1810	Gohanna mare 1803	Fraxinella	Woodpecker mare
Dam Filagree (GB) 1815	Soothsayer; 1808	Sorcerer	Trumpator
Dam Filagree (GB) 1815	Soothsayer; 1808	Sorcerer	Young Giantess
Dam Filagree (GB) 1815	Soothsayer; 1808	Golden Locky	Delpini
Dam Filagree (GB) 1815	Soothsayer; 1808	Golden Locky	Violet
Dam Filagree (GB) 1815	Web; 1808	Waxy	Potoooooooo
Dam Filagree (GB) 1815	Web; 1808	Waxy	Maria
Dam Filagree (GB) 1815	Web; 1808	Penelope	Trumpator
Dam Filagree (GB) 1815	Web; 1808	Penelope	Prunella (Family 1-s)
