= Pocahontas (horse) =

British-bred Thoroughbred racehorse

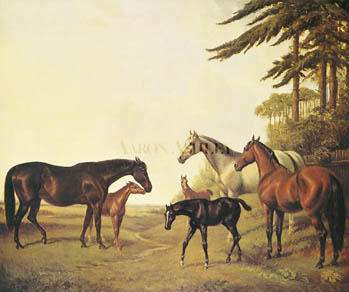
- A painting of Pocahontas (left), with Stockwell as a foal
- Sire: Glencoe
- Grandsire: Sultan
- Dam: Marpessa
- Damsire: Muley
- Sex: Mare
- Foaled: 1837
- Country: Britain
- Colour: Bay
- Breeder: King William IV
- Owner: 1) King William IV; 2) Lord Stradbroke; 3) Mr. Greatorex; 4) William Theobald; 5) 3rd Marquis of Exeter
- Trainer: Unknown
- Record: 9: 0-3-1
- Earnings: Unknown
- Last updated on February 21, 2011

Pocahontas (1837–1870) was an English Thoroughbred racehorse and the dam of three sires who had a great influence on the breed. Although mares are not generally considered to be as influential as sires, Thoroughbred Heritage refers to Pocahontas as "one of the most influential Thoroughbreds of all time, male or female."

== Background ==
Bred at the Royal Stud at Hampton Court, Pocahontas was by Glencoe, winner of the 2,000 Guineas, Goodwood Cup, Ascot Gold Cup, and The Whip, and later a renowned sire in America. Pocahontas' dam, Marpessa, won the Nursery Stakes at Newmarket as a two-year-old and the Goodwood Stakes as a three-year-old. She was bred to Glencoe in 1836 and produced her first foal, the filly Pocahontas. She later produced Idas (2,000 Guineas winner), Jeremy Diddler, and Boarding School Miss.

After the death of King William IV, the stud at Hampton Court was dispersed. Marpessa and Pocahontas (still a foal) were bought for 230 guineas by Lord Stradbroke. As a yearling, Pocahontas was sold to Mr. Greatorex for 62 guineas. Pocahontas was quite small (maturing only to 14 hands 3 inches 59 inches (150 cm) high) but was said to have had good shoulders and hindquarters, with straight legs. However, she was known for her rather difficult temperament and (like her mother) was a roarer.

== Racing career ==
Pocahontas raced once as a two-year-old, finishing third at the Criterion Stakes (after Gibraltar and Crucifix, who won in a dead heat). She raced again as a three-year-old; she was the favorite in the Oaks but finished fourth, partly due to her poor behavior. She finished fifth in the Goodwood Stakes, racing against some of the best males at that time. Pocahontas raced three times as a four-year-old; although she was unplaced in the Goodwood Cup and the Cesarewitch Handicap, she placed second three times during her four- and five-year-old seasons. Between the Goodwood Cup and the Cesarewitch, Pocahontas was sold to Mr. William Theobald (owner of Stockwell Stud). She was winless in her nine starts; this may have been because she was competing against high-quality male horses, or because of her roaring.

== As a broodmare ==
Theobald bred Pocahontas as a five-year-old to his stallion Camel, producing Cambaules (who was said to be a roarer and only placed on the track). In 1845 she bore a colt by Muley Moloch, although he was neither named nor raced and was also said to be a roarer. She was bred to Muley Moloch again, producing the filly Dolly Varden (who won once on the track and did not have a successful breeding career. Bred a third time to Muley Moloch her resulting filly was unimpressive, although the filly bore a few impressive offspring several generations later. Pocahontas' next three years produced her greatest legacy as a broodmare with the births of Stockwell (The "Emperor of Stallions"), Rataplan, and King Tom.

She was bred by Theobald for several years before being sold to the Marquis of Exeter in 1852. The Marquis' horse (Stockwell) was a successful sire at this time and he decided to purchase Pocahontas, Stockwell's 15-year-old dam, for his stud in Newmarket. Before she was moved to the Marquis' stud she produced Strood (a chestnut by Chatham) who was injured when young and never won. At Newmarket she foaled the filly Ayaconora, who won the Hopeful and the Newmarket Column Stakes and produced Chattanooga (winner of the Criterion Stakes and sire of the stallion Wellingtonia) and several great broodmares. She also produced The Knight of Kars, who was fairly successful on the track but more important as a sire of steeplechasers; he sired The Colonel (two-time winner of the Grand National Steeplechase).

Pocahontas' 1858 colt Knight of St. Patrick won four races, despite inheriting his dam's roaring. He later sired 2,000 Guineas winner Moslem. Her 1860 colt Automation won three times, including the Abington Mile, before dying as a three-year-old. In 1861 Auricula was born; the filly became the second classic winner and second St. Leger winner produced by Pocahontas.

Pocahontas' last foal, the filly Araucaria, won the 10-furlong Stamford Plate despite also being a roarer. Araucaria became an excellent broodmare herself. She foaled Camelia (by Macaroni), the winner of the 1,000 Guineas and Oaks; Chamant (by Flageolet), winner of the 2,000 Guineas; Rayon d'Or (by Flageolet), St. Leger winner and an excellent sire in America; and Wellingtonia (by Chattanooga), a leading sire in France.

Although she was bred six more years, Pocahontas never foaled. She was sold after the death of Lord Exeter in 1867, and bought for 10 guineas by the 3rd Marquis of Exeter. She spent the rest of her years at Wothorpe, part of the estate at Burghley Park, and died in 1870 at the age of 33.

=== The foals ===
Foaled	Name	Sex	Major wins/Achievements
1843	Cambaules	Gelding	
1846	Dolly Varden	Mare	
1848	Indiana	Mare	
1849	Stockwell	Stallion	Leading sire in Great Britain and Ireland (7 times)
1850	Rataplan	Stallion	Doncaster Cup
1851	King Tom	Stallion	Leading sire in Great Britain and Ireland
1852	Srood	Stallion	
1854	Ayacanora	Mare	
1855	The Knight of Kars	Stallion	
1856	Heroine of Lucknow	Mare	
1858	Knight of St. Patrick	Stallion	
1860	Automation	Stallion	
1861	Auricula	Mare	
1862	Araucaria	Mare	

== Genetic legacy ==
Pocahontas was most influential as a broodmare, producing three great sons – Stockwell, Rataplan, and King Tom – and five influential daughters. Stockwell is the most notable of the three, as he appears in the pedigrees of Phalaris, Nearco, and Native Dancer. She produced a total of 15 foals, the last at the age of 25. It has been theorized that (along with her roaring trait which has a proven genetic basis in Thoroughbreds) Pocahontas may have carried the "X-factor", a genetic mutation believed to be responsible for causing an enlarged heart suitable for elite athletic performance. This theory has been dismissed in scientific circles and the proponents of this theory have not produced any peer reviewed data to prove this theory.

== Pedigree ==
Pedigree of Pocahontas, bay mare, 1837
Sire Glencoe (GB) ch. 1831	Sultan b. 1816	Selim ch. 1802	Buzzard ch. 1787
Sire Glencoe (GB) ch. 1831	Sultan b. 1816	Selim ch. 1802	Alexander mare b. 1790
Sire Glencoe (GB) ch. 1831	Sultan b. 1816	Bacchante b. 1809	Williamson's Ditto b. 1800
Sire Glencoe (GB) ch. 1831	Sultan b. 1816	Bacchante b. 1809	Mercury mare b. 1791
Sire Glencoe (GB) ch. 1831	Trampoline ch. 1825	Tramp b. 1810	Dick Andrews b. 1797
Sire Glencoe (GB) ch. 1831	Trampoline ch. 1825	Tramp b. 1810	Gohanna mare b. 1803
Sire Glencoe (GB) ch. 1831	Trampoline ch. 1825	Web b. 1808	Waxy b. 1790
Sire Glencoe (GB) ch. 1831	Trampoline ch. 1825	Web b. 1808	Penelope b. 1798
Dam Marpessa (GB) b. 1830	Muley b. 1810	Orville b. 1799	Beningbrough b. 1791
Dam Marpessa (GB) b. 1830	Muley b. 1810	Orville b. 1799	Evelina br. 1791
Dam Marpessa (GB) b. 1830	Muley b. 1810	Eleanor b. 1798	Whiskey* b. 1789
Dam Marpessa (GB) b. 1830	Muley b. 1810	Eleanor b. 1798	Young Giantess b. 1790
Dam Marpessa (GB) b. 1830	Clare b. 1824	Marmion b. 1806	Whiskey* b. 1789
Dam Marpessa (GB) b. 1830	Clare b. 1824	Marmion b. 1806	Young Noisette b. 1789
Dam Marpessa (GB) b. 1830	Clare b. 1824	Harpalice b. 1814	Gohanna b. 1790
Dam Marpessa (GB) b. 1830	Clare b. 1824	Harpalice b. 1814	Amazon b. 1799

Note: b. = Bay, ch. = Chestnut, br. = Brown

* Pocahontas is inbred 4D × 4D to the stallion Whiskey, meaning that he appears fourth generation twice and on the dam side of her pedigree.

== See also ==
- X-factor
- Glencoe I
- Stockwell (horse)
