= Bay Middleton (horse) =

British-bred Thoroughbred racehorse

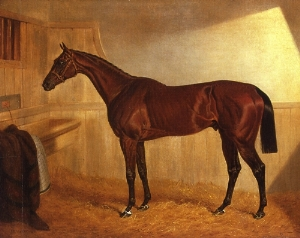
- Sire: Sultan
- Grandsire: Selim
- Dam: Cobweb
- Damsire: Phantom
- Sex: Stallion
- Foaled: 1833
- Country: United Kingdom of Great Britain and Ireland
- Colour: Bay
- Breeder: George Child Villiers, 5th Earl of Jersey
- Owner: George Child Villiers, 5th Earl of Jersey; Lord George Bentinck
- Trainer: James Edwards
- Record: 6: 6-0-0

Major wins
- Riddlesworth Stakes (1836); 2000 Guineas (1836); Epsom Derby (1836)

Awards
- Leading sire in GB and Ireland (1844, 1849)
- Last updated on 26 August 2007

Bay Middleton (1833 – 17 November 1857) was an undefeated Thoroughbred racehorse whose victories included two British Classic Races. He was twice the Leading sire in Great Britain and Ireland.

== Breeding ==
Bay Middleton's breeding was superb. His sire, Sultan, ran from age two to eight, winning the July Stakes, the Trial Stakes (Newmarket) twice, and came second in the Derby. At stud, he was leading sire from 1832 to 1837, during which time he sired Glencoe, Achmet, Ibrahim, Augustus, Galata, Green Mantle and Destiny. Selim, was not only beautiful, but won several races including Newmarket's Oatlands twice.

Bay Middleton's dam, Cobweb, was referred to as the "Queen of racing mares." She was undefeated on the turf, winning the Oaks and the 1000 Guineas. Cobweb was a granddaughter of the great mare, Web, who also produced the Derby winner Middleton, the influential Trampoline (1825, also dam of the 2000 Guineas winner Glencoe), and Cobweb's dam Filagree (1815). Bay Middleton was Cobweb's seventh foal.

Filagree went on to produce two 1000 Guineas winners: Charlotte West and Clementina. Clementina was also a successful broodmare, and from her descends the filly Jest, the St. Leger Stakes winner Black Jester, Royal Palace, 2000 Guineas and Grand Prix de Paris winner Paradox, and the broodmare La Troienne. Filagree also produced two 2000 Guineas winning sons, Riddlesworth and Achment (1834); six winners of the Riddlesworth Stakes, and the stallion Young Emilius (1828, by Emilius), who was sold to France where he got Prix du Jockey Club winner Amalfi and Fitz-Emilius.

== Conformation ==
Bay Middleton had, as his name suggests, a bay coat, which was mottled and darkened as he aged, and three white coronary bands. He had a good shoulder, well laid back, and strong hindquarters and gaskins, but the 16 hands and 1½ inches high colt also had weak loins and a very short back. Like his grandsire, Selim, he had a beautiful head and arching neck.

== Racing record ==
Bay Middleton was a difficult horse to ride, and Lord Jersey had to beg the great jockey James Robinson (who had ridden five Derby winners) to try him. Their first ride did not go well, as Bay Middleton broke his martingale and bolted. However, Robinson continued to ride the horse throughout his one-season career, in 1836.

In his first race, the Riddlesworth Stakes (Newmarket Craven) he defeated five other horses in the "commonest of canters. " He was in good company that day, beating Mendicant, the 1000 Guineas winner Destiny (by Sultan), and Magician (by Zinganee). Bay Middleton won his second race with walk over, for £150, before taking the 2000 Guineas (Newmarket), defeated Elis and four others at a speed which was debated to have been a new record. He then won the Epsom Derby by two lengths, to beat 21 horses including Gladiator, Slane, and Venison. His next race was in the Buckhurst Stakes at Ascot, where he won in a canter.

At the Grand Duke Michael Stakes, 21 horses withdrew to leave only Bay Middleton and St. Leger winner Elis. Bay Middleton pulled ahead, being hit once with the whip—the single time it was used in his career—to win by a length. The colt finished his race career with a match at Newmarket Houghton against Muezzin for 300 guineas. Despite carrying the greater weight, he won "with ridiculous ease."

Following this race, he was sold to Lord George Bentinck for 4000 guineas, who wished to run the colt in the Ascot Gold Cup. However, this dream was never realized as Bay Middleton had physical problems with one of his forelegs, attributed to either the tendons or to a broken bone in his hoof. So he was retired and sent to stud.

== Stud record ==
Due to his fine bloodlines and excellent track record, Bay Middleton covered some very good quality mares. However, his get were average, and he was considered a failure at stud. Despite this fact, he managed to make to be the Leading Sire for two years: 1844 (48 winners) and 1849 (28 winners). He also got four classic winners, in The Flying Dutchman, The Hermit, Andover, and Aphrodite, but many of his get had a tendency to roar, and he also seemed to pass on club-footedness to his offspring (possibly due to the Soothsayer blood in his veins).

Bay Middleton stood at the brand-new Bentinck's stud, first for a fee of 30 guineas, which would drop during his breeding career to 10 guineas, before it reached 50 guineas at the end of his career. His ownership also changed during this time, as he was sold to E.L. Mostyn after Bentinck died in 1848. He died himself after an illness on 17 November 1857, and was buried near his stall door.

His important progeny included:

- All Round My Hat: 1842 filly out of 1837 One Thousand Guineas winner Chapeau d'Espagne, was a good runner.
- Andover: 1851 bay colt, out of a Defence mare. Won the Derby from King Tom and 2000 Guineas winner The Hermit. Sired nothing of note.
- Aphrodite: 1848 filly, from Venus by Sir Hercules, won the 1000 Guineas, the Champagne Stakes and the Park Hill Stakes. Second in the Doncaster St. Leger, dead-heated in the July Stakes at Newmarket and lost in the run-off. Dam of Siderolite (winner of the Ascot Gold Vase and the Goodwood Cup) and Argonaut (winner of the 1865 City and Suburban Handicap at Epsom).
- Aristides: 1840 colt, out of a Lottery mare, and a good racehorse.
- Autocrat: 1851 colt, out of an Emilius mare, won the New Stakes at Ascot. Daughters included Queen Elizabeth (1859, dam to Plebeian, who would defeat Galopin)
- Barbatus: 1850 colt out of a Landercost mare, ran third in the 1853 2000 Guineas.
- Bay Missy: 1842 filly out of a Young Phantom mare, second dam of Ascot Gold Cup winner Scottish Chief
- Bouquet: 1856 out of a Melbourne mare, granddam of Ascot Stakes winner Chrypre.
- Bridal: 1839 filly out of a Whalebone mare, dam to Troussau (1849, winner of the Gimcrack Stakes), Fichu (1866, winner of the Stewards' Cup), and Special License.
- Cowl: 1842 colt, out of Crucifix, won the 1844 Buckenham Stakes, the 1845 Ascot Produce Stakes, and ran third in the Emperor's Plate. Dislocated both hind pasterns and was retired to stud, where he was fairly successful. His get include Mme. Eglantine, who produced the runners Rosicrucian, The Palmer, and Morna, and the broodmares Monaca (dam to Stewards' Cup winner Monico), Chaplet (dam to Ascot Gold Cup winner Morion, and Winkfield), Jocosa (dam to Woodcote Stakes winner Sabella), and Frivola. Also a daughter of Cowl was Morgan La Faye, who was dam of the Epsom Oaks winner, Marie Stuart.
- Ellen Middleton: 1846 filly out of Myrrha (by Malek), second in the Champagne Stakes to The Flying Dutchman, won 1848 Sapling Stakes (York), the Yorkshire Oaks, and second in the 1849 Doncaster Park Hill Stakes to Oaks winner Lady Evelyn. Dam of the Derby winner Wild Dayrell (1852, winner of the Ebor St. Leger, the Queen's Vase at Ascot, and the Stockbridge Stewards' Cup; sire of Buccaneer, The Rake, and Wild Oats).
- Ennui: 1843 filly, out of Blue Devils (by Velocipede), won the 300 sovereign sweepstakes at the 1847 Goodwood. Dam of Goodwood Cup winner Saunterer, Loiterer, Lady Rodem (dam to Liddington), Bravery (dam of Ascot Gold Cup winning filly, Rupee, and Salamanca, dam of St. Leger winner Pero Gomez).
- Gaper: 1840 colt, defeated Derby-winner Cotherstone in the Criterion at Newmarket, third in the Gratwicke Stakes, won the Bickerstaffe Stakes at Liverpool. Went on to sire field hunters.
- Gaze: 1842 filly, sister to Gaper. Never raced, but produced American Eclipse, an undefeated racehorse.
- Honeycomb: 1846 colt out of Beeswax, ran 4th in the 1849 Derby and St. Leger, both to The Flying Dutchman, second in the 2000 Guineas, 2nd in the Ebor St. Leger at York.
- Messalina: 1840 filly, produced the filly Slapdash (1855). Slapdash, dam of Fervacques (Grand Prix de Paris), Saltarelle (Prix du Jockey Club), Salteador (Prix Daru, Prix Lupin, others) and sire Saxifrage.
- Nun Appleton: 1845 filly out a Malek mare, dam of Attraction (1861, winner of sixteen races), and Julie (1856, dam of Beaufort Cup and Cesarewitch winner, Julius and Royal Hunt Cup winner Julius Caesar). Second dam of Stewards Cup winner, Sister Helen and Grand National Steeplechase, winner Voluptuary.
- Princess Alice: 1843 filly out of a Velocipede mare, won Doncaster's Champagne Stakes and the Nassau Stakes.
- Pug: 1845 filly, third in the Somersetshire Stakes at Bath.
- Rose of Cashmere: 1842 filly, won the Nursery Stakes, dam of Eccleston (1851, by Touchstone) and Wild Rose.
- Rushlight: 1841 filly out of a Lamplighter mare, second dam of Melbourne Cup and Victoria Derby winner Lantern.
- Sunflower: 1847 filly, dam of St. Leger winner, Sunbeam, Gimcrack Stakes winner, Rainbow, Mayflower (fifth dam of Celt), and Crocus (fifth dam of Gay Crusader (Triple Crown winner); third dam of Galeottia (1000 Guineas winner) and ancestress of Grand National winners Royal Mail and Well to Do).
- The Devil to Pay: 1841, won the Gorhambury Stakes handicap, second in the 1844 Two Thousand Guineas, third in 1845 Goodwood.
- The Flying Dutchman: 1846 brown colt, out of a Sandbeck mare, by far his best foal. He won all but one race, including two classic races (the Derby and the St. Leger), as well as the July Stakes at Newmarket, the Champagne Stakes at Doncaster, the Bickerstaffe Stakes at Liverpool, the Belvoir Stakes, the Emperor of Russia's Plate (substitute Ascot Gold Cup) and a famous 1000 guineas match against Voltigeur. He was second in the Leading Sires list for three years, and his get include Brown Duchess, Ellington (winner of the Derby), Flying Duchess (dam of Galopin, sire of St. Simon), and Dollar (sire of Upas and Androclès).
- The Hermit: 1851 brown colt, from Jenny Lind by Touchstone. Won his first start—the 2000 Guineas—was third in the Derby and won the Ascot Gold Vase (beating Rataplan). Was sold to Australia, where he sired Ave Maria (a good racemare and dam of stakes winner, Reginald).
- Unnamed mare (1839): out of Nitocris (by Whisker), second dam of Fisherman (GB) (1853, twice winner of the Ascot Gold Cup), third dam of Gemma di Vergy.

== Sire line tree ==
- Bay Middleton
  - Aristides
  - Bramble
  - Farintosh
  - Gaper
  - Baveno
  - Bay Momus
  - Pastoral
    - Collingwood
  - The-Devil-To-Pay
  - Best Bower
  - Cowl
    - The Confessor
      - Cock-a-Hoop
    - The Friar
    - The Grand Inquisitor
  - Joy
  - Gabbler
  - Planet
    - Aster
  - Honeycomb
  - The Flying Dutchman
    - Ellington
      - Delight
        - Galopin
      - Montgoubert
    - Fly-By-Night
    - Peter Wilkens
      - The Quack
      - Benvolio
    - Flying Pieman
      - Old England
        - New Holland
    - Ignoramus
      - Ignorant
    - Purston
      - Sir Watkin
        - Bide-A-Wee
    - Amsterdam
    - Duneany
    - Glenbuck
    - The Rover
    - Cape Flyaway
      - Good Hope
    - Tom Bowline
      - Make Haste
    - Winton
    - Young Dutchman
    - Ellerton
    - Romulus
    - Walloon
    - Dollar
      - Dami
      - Il Maestro
      - Salvanos
      - Androcles
        - Cambyse
      - Saint Cyr
        - Pastisson
      - Salvator
        - Elzevir
        - Ossian
      - Fountainebleau
        - Phlegathon
        - Jouancy
      - Patriarche
        - Gettatore
        - Lutin
        - Beau Page
      - Thieusies
      - Greenback
      - Prologue
        - Vin Sec
      - Vignemale
        - Gil Peres
        - Merlin
        - Caudeyran
      - Louis D'Or
      - Saumur
        - Clamart
      - Cimier
      - Garrick
        - Oranzeb
        - Marzio
        - Onorio
        - Ulpiano
      - Martin Pecheur
      - Sansonnet
        - Courlis
        - Coq
      - The Condor
        - Tancarville
        - Cloridano
      - Saint Honore
      - Souci
      - Upas
        - Omnium II
        - Elf
        - Ivoire
      - Acheron
        - Massina
        - Atleta
        - Ranquel
      - Bocage
        - Ob
      - Dauphin
        - Hero
        - Hareng
      - Cerbere
    - Tourmalet
    - Dutch Skater
      - Insulaire
        - Thomery
      - Burgomaster
      - Dutch Roller
      - Sherbrooke
      - Yellow
        - Daphnis
        - Dandolo
      - Accumulator
    - Massinissa
    - Jarnac
      - Old Tom
  - Osterley
  - Hesperus
    - Sir Birtram
    - Diomedes
      - Parawhenua
      - Kakupo
  - St Aubyn
  - Barbatus
  - Vanderdecken
  - Andover
    - Craymond
      - Harmonium
      - Post Haste
    - Walkington
  - The Hermit
    - Freetrader
  - Autocrat
  - Bessus
  - Milton
  - Anton

== Pedigree ==
Pedigree of Bay Middleton, bay stallion, 1833
| Sire Sultan Bay 1816 | Selim; Chestnut 1802 | Buzzard | Woodpecker |
| Sire Sultan Bay 1816 | Selim; Chestnut 1802 | Buzzard | Misfortune |
| Sire Sultan Bay 1816 | Selim; Chestnut 1802 | Alexander mare (1790) | Alexander |
| Sire Sultan Bay 1816 | Selim; Chestnut 1802 | Alexander mare (1790) | Highflyer mare (1780) |
| Sire Sultan Bay 1816 | Bacchante; Bay 1809 | Williamson's Ditto | Sir Peter Teazle* |
| Sire Sultan Bay 1816 | Bacchante; Bay 1809 | Williamson's Ditto | Arethusa* |
| Sire Sultan Bay 1816 | Bacchante; Bay 1809 | Mercury mare (1791) | Mercury |
| Sire Sultan Bay 1816 | Bacchante; Bay 1809 | Mercury mare (1791) | Herod mare (8) (1776) |
| Dam Cobweb Bay 1821 | Phantom; Bay 1808 | Walton | Sir Peter Teazle* |
| Dam Cobweb Bay 1821 | Phantom; Bay 1808 | Walton | Arethusa* |
| Dam Cobweb Bay 1821 | Phantom; Bay 1808 | Julia | Whiskey |
| Dam Cobweb Bay 1821 | Phantom; Bay 1808 | Julia | Young Giantess |
| Dam Cobweb Bay 1821 | Fillagree; Chestnut 1815 | Soothsayer | Sorcerer |
| Dam Cobweb Bay 1821 | Fillagree; Chestnut 1815 | Soothsayer | Goldenlocks |
| Dam Cobweb Bay 1821 | Fillagree; Chestnut 1815 | Web | Waxy |
| Dam Cobweb Bay 1821 | Fillagree; Chestnut 1815 | Web | Penelope (Family: 1-s) |

* Bay Middleton is inbred 4S x 4D to the stallion Sir Peter Teazle, meaning that he appears fourth generation on the sire side of his pedigree and fourth generation on the dam side of his pedigree.

* Bay Middleton is inbred 4S x 4D to the mare Arethusa, meaning that she appears fourth generation on the sire side of his pedigree and fourth generation on the dam side of his pedigree.

== See also ==
- List of leading Thoroughbred racehorses
