= Cobweb (horse) =

British-bred Thoroughbred racehorse

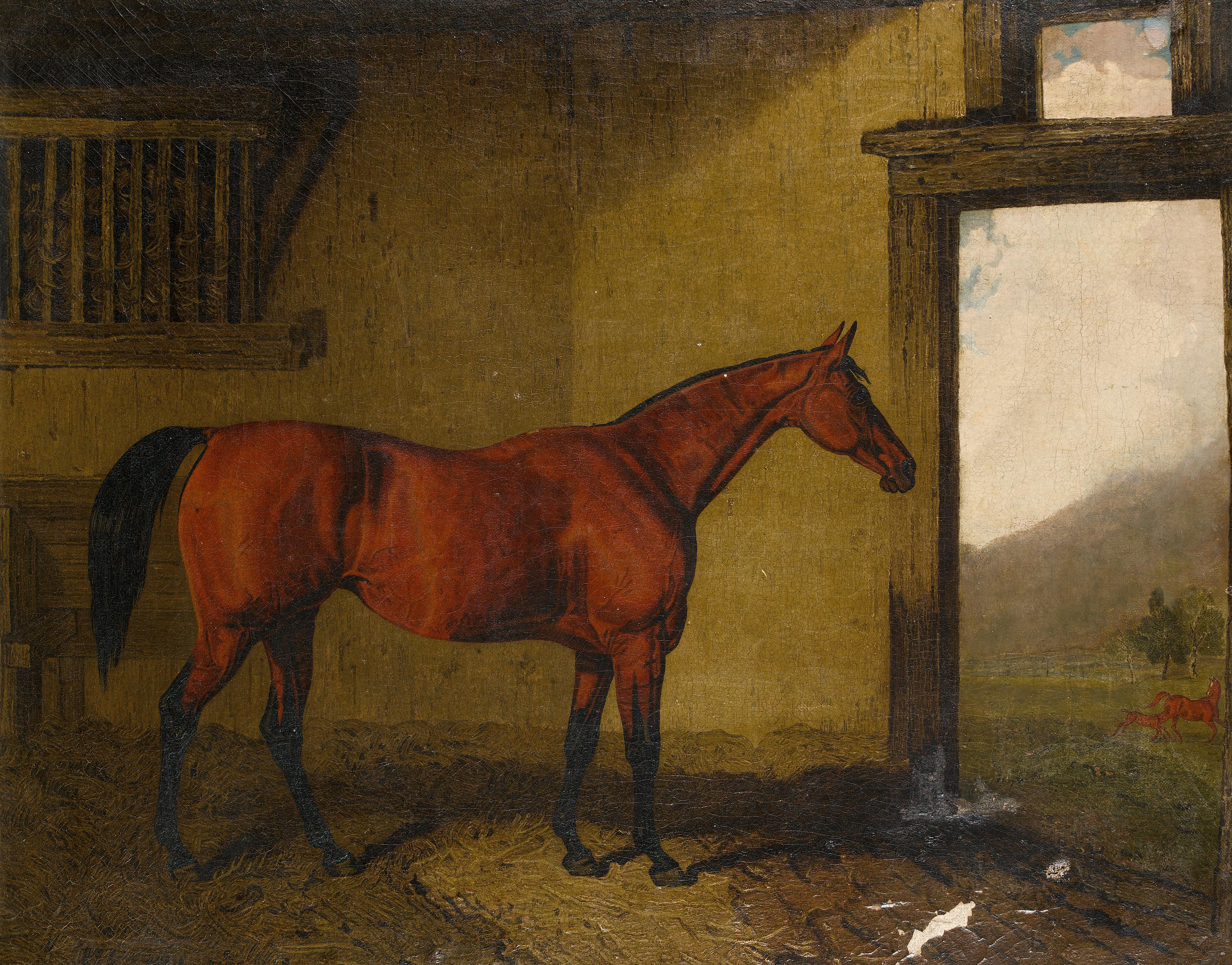
- Cobweb in a loose box by Lambert Marshall
- Sire: Phantom
- Grandsire: Walton
- Dam: Filagree
- Damsire: Soothsayer
- Sex: Mare
- Foaled: 1821
- Country: United Kingdom of Great Britain and Ireland
- Colour: Bay
- Breeder: George Child Villiers, 5th Earl of Jersey
- Owner: 5th Earl of Jersey
- Trainer: James Edwards
- Record: 3:3-0-0

Major wins
- 1000 Guineas (1824); Oaks Stakes (1824)

Cobweb (1821–1848) was an undefeated British Thoroughbred racehorse and who won two British Classic Races as a three-year-old and went on to become a highly successful broodmare. Cobweb's racing career consisted of three competitive races in the early part of 1824. After winning on her debut she claimed a second prize when her opponents were withdrawn by their owners. She then won the 1000 Guineas at Newmarket Racecourse and the Oaks Stakes at Epsom Downs Racecourse before being retired to stud.

Cobweb produced three classic winners, including The Derby winner Bay Middleton, and several other successful racehorses. Through her daughter Clementina she is the direct female ancestor of many champions of the nineteenth, twentieth and twenty-first centuries.

== Background ==
Cobweb was a bay mare bred by her owner George Child Villiers, 5th Earl of Jersey at his stud at Middleton Stoney in Oxfordshire. She was sired by Phantom, who won the 1811 Epsom Derby before becoming a highly successful stallion. His progeny included two Derby winners (Cedric and Middleton) and two winners of the 2000 Guineas (Enamel and Pindarrie). The successes of Cobweb in 1824 enabled Phantom to become the British champion sire for the second time.

Cobweb came from an extremely successful female family which traced back to the Duke of Grafton's outstanding and influential broodmare Prunella. Cobweb's dam Filagree also produced the 2000 Guineas winner Riddlesworth and the filly Charlotte West who won the 1000 Guineas in 1830. Filagree was a daughter of Web, the foundation mare of Thoroughbred family 1-s, and a sister of the Derby winner Middleton and the leading broodmare Trampoline. Lord Jersey bought Web from the Duke of Grafton in about 1812, and she became his stud's foundation mare.

Like all of Jersey's classic winners, Cobweb was prepared for racing by his private trainer James Edwards.

== Racing career ==
=== 1824: three-year-old season ===
Cobweb made her first appearance on 19 April, the first day of the Newmarket Craven meeting. In a Sweepstakes over the Ditch Mile course she was ridden by Sam Barnard and won at odds of 1/4 from her only rival, a "black" filly (later named Grey Helen) owned by the Duke of Portland. Two weeks later, on the opening day of the First Spring meeting, Cobweb was scheduled to run in another Sweepstakes over the same course and distance, but Lord Jersey was able to claim the prize without running his filly when the other two entries were withdrawn by their owners. Three days later, Cobweb was ridden by James Robinson in the eleventh running of the 1000 Guineas Stakes. Only three fillies appeared to oppose her, but they included the Duke of Grafton's Rebecca, who had won the Riddlesworth Stakes and then defeated the future Derby winner Cedric at the Craven meeting. Cobweb was the second choice in the betting at 5/2 and won from Rebecca, the 8/11 favourite.

On 4 June, Cobweb was moved up in distance to contest the Oaks Stakes over one and a half miles at Epsom. She was again partnered by Robinson and started the 8/11 favourite in a field of thirteen runners with Rebecca being made the 9/2 second favourite. She won the race from Mr Yates's grey filly Fille de Joie. Although Cobweb was perfectly sound after the race, Lord Jersey decided to retire the filly to stud without racing again.

== Stud record ==
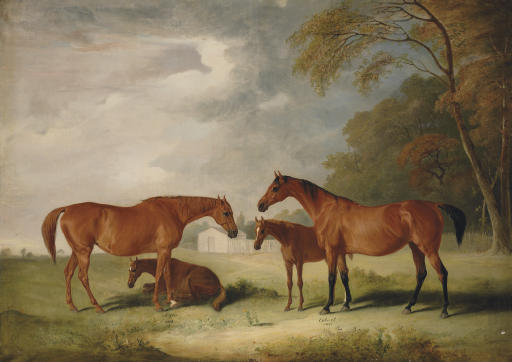
Filigree and her Daughter Cobweb, with Foals in a Landscape by John Ferneley c. 1827.

Cobweb was retired from racing to become a broodmare at Lord Jersey's stud. Between 1827 and 1842 she produced twelve foals– nine colts and three fillies.

=== Sons ===
Cobweb's first son was Young Emilius, foaled in 1828. He was not a champion racehorse, but was later exported to France where he became a highly successful breeding stallion, siring the Prix du Jockey Club winners Renonce, Fitz-Emilius, Gambetti and Amalfi. Cobweb's second colt was unraced, but her third, Lucius won the 1833 Riddlesworth Stakes, a race for three-year-olds which at the time was ranked alongside the classics in importance. Cobweb's 1833 was a colt by Sultan named Bay Middleton, who was unbeaten in six races including the Riddlesworth Stakes, 2000 Guineas and Derby. He went on to sire the Derby and St Leger winner The Flying Dutchman and was champion sire in 1844 and 1849. In 1834 Cobweb produced Bay Middleton's full brother Achmet who partially emulated his older sibling by winning the Riddlesworth Stakes and the 2000 Guineas in 1835. Her next two colts, Phoenix and Caesar both won the Riddlesworth Stakes, giving the mare her fourth and fifth winners of the race. Cobweb produced four more colts, none of whom were particularly distinguished racehorses, although her 1839 foal Jersey had some success as a stallion in Australia.

=== Daughters ===
Cobweb's first foal was a filly by Comus who never raced. Her 1831 foal, named Nell Gwynne, was good enough to run in the 1834 Oaks but had no recorded foals. Cobweb did not give birth to another filly until her last foal, Clementina (sired by Venison) was born in 1844. Clementina was a highly successful racehorse who won the 1000 Guineas, Oaks and Nassau Stakes in 1847 and it is through her descendants that Cobweb's direct line of descent continues to the present day.

The first of Clementina's descendants to win a classic was Paradox, winner of the 2000 Guineas and the Grand Prix de Paris in 1885. Paradox's sister Inchbonny continued the line, being the ancestor of the influential broodmare Absurdity, La Troienne and Adargatis.

Absurdity produced two classic winners in Jest and Black Jester and was the ancestor of several others including Humorist, User Friendly, Royal Palace and Moonshell. Other horses who trace the tail-female line to Absurdity are the Australian champions Miss Finland and Stylish Century as well as the American Champion Male Turf Horse Cape Blanco.

La Troienne is one of the most influential broodmares in North American breeding, being the ancestor of such notable horses as Black Helen, Bimelech, Personality, Easy Goer, Smarty Jones, Super Saver, Prairie Bayou, Go For Gin, Sea Hero and Princess Rooney. Her family also had success in Europe with horses such as Allez France and Caerleon. La Troienne is regarded as the foundation mare of Thoroughbred family 1-x.

Adragatis, a sister of La Troienne, won the Prix de Diane in 1934. She was the dam of the Prix de l'Arc de Triomphe winner Ardan and Pardal, the sire of Psidium. Her later descendants included the Kentucky Derby winner Spend A Buck and the Irish 1000 Guineas winner Hula Angel.

== Pedigree ==
Pedigree of Cobweb (GB), bay mare, 1821
Sire Phantom (GB) 1808	Walton; 1799	Sir Peter Teazle	Highflyer
Sire Phantom (GB) 1808	Walton; 1799	Sir Peter Teazle	Papillon
Sire Phantom (GB) 1808	Walton; 1799	Arethusa	Dungannon
Sire Phantom (GB) 1808	Walton; 1799	Arethusa	Prophet mare
Sire Phantom (GB) 1808	Julia; 1799	Whiskey	Saltram
Sire Phantom (GB) 1808	Julia; 1799	Whiskey	Calash
Sire Phantom (GB) 1808	Julia; 1799	Young Giantess*	Diomed
Sire Phantom (GB) 1808	Julia; 1799	Young Giantess*	Giantess
Dam Filagree (GB) 1815	Soothsayer; 1808	Sorceror	Trumpator*
Dam Filagree (GB) 1815	Soothsayer; 1808	Sorceror	Young Giantess*
Dam Filagree (GB) 1815	Soothsayer; 1808	Golden Locks	Delpini
Dam Filagree (GB) 1815	Soothsayer; 1808	Golden Locks	Violet
Dam Filagree (GB) 1815	Web; 1808	Waxy	Potoooooooo
Dam Filagree (GB) 1815	Web; 1808	Waxy	Maria
Dam Filagree (GB) 1815	Web; 1808	Penelope	Trumpator*
Dam Filagree (GB) 1815	Web; 1808	Penelope	Prunella (Family 1-s)

* Cobweb is inbred 3S x 4D to the mare Young Giantess, meaning that she appears third generation on the sire side of her pedigree and fourth generation on the dam side of her pedigree.

* Cobweb is inbred 4D x 4D to the stallion Trumpator, meaning that he appears fourth generation twice on the dam side of her pedigree.
