= Destiny (horse) =

British-bred Thoroughbred racehorse

- Sire: Sultan
- Grandsire: Selim
- Dam: Fanny Davies
- Damsire: Filho da Puta
- Sex: Mare
- Foaled: 1833
- Country: United Kingdom
- Colour: Chestnut
- Breeder: Thomas Houldsworth
- Owner: Thomas Houldsworth
- Trainer: John Barham Day
- Record: 11: 3-6-2

Major wins
- 1000 Guineas (1836); King's Plate (Lincoln) (1836)

Destiny (1833 – after 1852) was a British Thoroughbred racehorse and broodmare who won the classic 1000 Guineas at Newmarket Racecourse in 1836. In a racing career which lasted from September 1835 until April 1837, the filly raced eleven times and won three times. Destiny's only competitive victories came at the First Spring meeting at Newmarket in 1836, when she won a Sweepstakes and the 1000 Guineas: her only other success was a walkover at Lincoln Racecourse that autumn. Although she finished second in The Oaks never finished worse than third in her career, she was regarded as a sub-standard classic winner. She made little impression at stud.

== Background ==
Destiny was a chestnut mare bred by Thomas Houldsworth of Farnsfield in Nottinghamshire. She was the fifth foal produced by Houldsworth's mare Fanny Davies, a winner of the Gold Cup at Pontefract. Fanny Davies was the grand-daughter of an unnamed mare by Hyacinthus who is regarded as the foundation mare of Thoroughbred family 2-f.

Destiny was sired by Sultan a descendant of the Byerley Turk who was British champion sire for six successive season from 1832 to 1837. Apart from Destiny he sired seven classic winners including the Bay Middleton, Galata, Glencoe, Green Mantle, Achmet, Ibrahim and Augustus.

The filly's trainer was not recorded in contemporary sources, but may well have been John Barham Day who rode her to her most important success.

== Racing career ==
=== 1835: two-year-old season ===
Destiny made her only racecourse appearance of 1835 on the day of the St Leger Stakes at Doncaster Racecourse in September. She finished third of the four runners behind John Gully's unnamed filly, who reportedly won "in a canter".

=== 1836: three-year-old season ===
Destiny began her three-year-old season on 4 April at the Newmarket Craven meeting. In the Riddlesworth Stakes over the Abingdon Mile course she finished third of the six runners to Bay Middleton a colt who went on to win the 2000 Guineas and The Derby. At the next Newmarket meeting two weeks later Destiny recorded her first win when she defeated Lord Exeter's filly Toga, her only opponent in a Sweepstakes over the Ditch Mile. Racing over the same course and distance three days later, Destiny started the 6/4 favourite against six rivals for the 1000 Guineas Stakes. Ridden as usual by John Barham Day, Destiny raced in third place before moving up to challenge the leaders Toga and Zenana inside the final furlong. After an "exceedingly pretty race" she won by a neck from Toga, with Zenana just behind in third.

In the Oaks Stakes over one and a half miles at Epsom on 20 May, Destiny was not strongly fancied, being the fifth choice in the betting at odds of 10/1. In the last quarter of a mile, she was one of five fillies who broke clear of the field and after a "grand struggle" she finished second by half a length to the favourite Cyprian.

Destiny did not race again until September, when she was sent to compete at the St Leger meeting at Doncaster Racecourse. Rather than running in the classic, she contested a race over the same course and distance two days later and finished second to the Leger runner-up Scroggins. By this time, Destiny was being described in the sporting press as "a very inferior mare". A week later, the filly appeared at Lincoln where she was allowed to walk over in a King's Plate for which she was the only entrant. Destiny ended her season with two runs at Nottingham Racecourse in October. In the two and a half mile Nottingham Cup she finished second to General Yates's colt Sylvan, with the 1835 Derby winner Mundig in third. On the following day she contested a £60 race run in a series of heats, with the prize going to the first horse to win twice. Destiny won the first heat but finished third in the next two to Mr Fowler's colt Heron.

=== 1837: four-year-old season ===
In the spring of 1837, Destiny appeared at Newmarket where she contested two match races. At the Craven meeting she started favourite, but was beaten by Lord Suffield's colt Newlight. over five furlongs for a prize of 200 guineas. At the next Newmarket meeting she was matched against Zenana, carrying seven pounds more than the filly who had finished third to her in the previous year's guineas. Zenana won the race to take a prize of 100 guineas. Destiny was immediately retired and "put to the stud", being covered by the stallion Defence.

== Stud record ==
Destiny was retired from racing to become a broodmare at her owner's stud. after producing five foals she was sold to Mr Drake and exported to France in 1843 where she produced the colt Piccinino, but returned to England two years later. She produced a further five foals in the ownership of Joseph Hawley before being "given away" in 1852.

== Pedigree ==
Pedigree of Destiny (GB), chestnut mare, 1833
Sire Sultan (GB) 1816	Selim; 1802	Buzzard	Woodpecker
Sire Sultan (GB) 1816	Selim; 1802	Buzzard	Misfortune
Sire Sultan (GB) 1816	Selim; 1802	Alexander mare	Alexander
Sire Sultan (GB) 1816	Selim; 1802	Alexander mare	Highflyer mare
Sire Sultan (GB) 1816	Bacchante; 1809	Williamson's Ditto	Sir Peter Teazle
Sire Sultan (GB) 1816	Bacchante; 1809	Williamson's Ditto	Arethusa
Sire Sultan (GB) 1816	Bacchante; 1809	Mercury mare	Mercury
Sire Sultan (GB) 1816	Bacchante; 1809	Mercury mare	Herod mare
Dam Fanny Davies (GB) 1823	Filho da Puta; 1812	Haphazard	Sir Peter Teazle
Dam Fanny Davies (GB) 1823	Filho da Puta; 1812	Haphazard	Miss Hervey
Dam Fanny Davies (GB) 1823	Filho da Puta; 1812	Mrs Barnet	Waxy
Dam Fanny Davies (GB) 1823	Filho da Puta; 1812	Mrs Barnet	Woodpecker mare
Dam Fanny Davies (GB) 1823	Tteasure; 1810	Camillus	Hambletonian
Dam Fanny Davies (GB) 1823	Tteasure; 1810	Camillus	Faith
Dam Fanny Davies (GB) 1823	Tteasure; 1810	Hyacinthus mare	Hyacinthus
Dam Fanny Davies (GB) 1823	Tteasure; 1810	Hyacinthus mare	Flora (Family: 2-f)
