= 1833 in sports =

1833 in sports describes the year's events in world sport.

== Baseball ==
Events

- Merger of the Olympic and Camden town ball clubs from Philadelphia and Camden, New Jersey, constituting the Olympic Ball Club of Philadelphia, often called the "Philadelphia Olympics". The constitution would be revised in 1837 and published in 1838.

== Boxing ==
Events

- 30 May — James Burke defeats Simon Byrne in 99 rounds. There are serious concerns about Byrne's health in the aftermath of the fight.
- 2 June — Byrne dies of injuries from the fight and Burke is arrested.
- 11 July — at Burke's trial, he is exonerated from blame for Byrne's death.
- Controversy about the English title continues as the now retired Jem Ward refuses to recognise Burke. The death of Byrne effectively ruins Burke's career and he is stigmatised.

== Cricket ==
Events

- John Nyren publishes The Cricketers Of My Time which has been serialised in The Town during the previous year
- First use by Sheffield Cricket Club of Yorkshire as a team name instead of Sheffield

England

- Most runs – Tom Marsden 181 @ 16.45 (HS 53)
- Most wickets – William Lillywhite 37 (BB 6–?)

== Horse racing ==
England

- 1,000 Guineas Stakes – Tarantella
- 2,000 Guineas Stakes – Clearwell
- The Derby – Dangerous
- The Oaks – Vespa
- St. Leger Stakes – Rockingham

== Rowing ==
The Boat Race

- The Oxford and Cambridge Boat Race is not held this year
