= Tarantella (horse) =

British-bred Thoroughbred racehorse

- Sire: Tramp
- Grandsire: Dick Andrews
- Dam: Katherine
- Damsire: Soothsayer
- Sex: Mare
- Foaled: 1830
- Country: United Kingdom
- Colour: Chestnut
- Owner: T. H. Cookes
- Trainer: John Robinson
- Record: 9:4-0-0

Major wins
- 1000 Guineas (1833)

Tarantella (foaled 1830) was a British Thoroughbred racehorse and broodmare who won the classic 1000 Guineas at Newmarket Racecourse in 1833. After winning the Guineas in her third race, Tarantella was unplaced when favourite for the Oaks Stakes and was well-beaten in two other races later that year. She won two minor races in the following year and was retired from racing having won four times from nine starts between October 1832 and August 1834. She was later exported to France where she proved to be a successful broodmare.

== Background ==
Tarantella was a long-striding chestnut mare bred by her owner Mr Cookes. She was sired by the Yorkshire-bred stallion Tramp, a successful racehorse and sire whose other progeny included The Derby winners St. Giles and Dangerous as well as the filly Charlotte West, the winner of the 1000 Guineas in 1830.

Tarantella's dam Katherine, won the Albany Stakes for her owner the Duke of Rutland in 1824 and went on to become a successful broodmare. Apart from Tarantella she produced the Riddlesworth Stakes winner Viator and the champion sire Taurus.

== Racing career ==
=== 1832: two-year-old season ===
Tarantella made her only appearance as a two-year-old in the Clearwell Stakes at Newmarket on 16 October 1832. She started 9/2 second favourite in a field of fifteen colts and fillies but finished unplaced behind Lord Orford's colt grey colt who was later named Clearwell.

=== 1833: three-year-old season ===
On 12 April at the Newmarket Craven meeting Tarantella ran against two opponents in a Sweepstakes over the Ditch Mile course. Ridden by Teddy Wright, she was made the 4/5 favourite and won by three lengths from Lord Exeter's filly Amima. Two weeks later, racing over the same course and distance, Tarantella was one of ten fillies to contest the 1000 Guineas Stakes. She started the 2/1 favourite ahead of Sir Mark Wood's Vespa. Partnered again by Wright, Tarantella won the classic by a length from Falernia with Vespa in third place. Although she won very easily, the Sporting Magazine suggested that she had been flattered by the moderate standard of the opposition and by the very soft ground which suited her "stilty joints". Tarantella was moved up in distance to contest the Oaks Stakes over one and a half miles at Epsom Downs Racecourse on 24 May. In a field of nineteen runners, she started the 2/1 favourite but was beaten before the horses entered the straight and finished unplaced behind Vespa.

Tarantella was rested during the summer when the firm ground made her difficult to train, before returning in early September to run twice without success in a meeting at Warwick Racecourse. On the opening day of the meeting she ran in the Guy Produce Stakes over one mile and finished unplaced behind a colt named Trepidation. Two days later she ran in a King's Plate, a race run in a series of two mile heats, with the prize going to the first horse to win twice. She finished third to the five-year-old mare Diana in the first heat but was then withdrawn from the second, in which Diana completed her victory.

=== 1834: four-year-old season ===
Tarantella remained in training as a four-year-old but did not run until August when she appeared in a meeting at Worcester. In a Sweepstakes over two miles she recorded her first success since the 1000 Guineas by winning from her two rivals Penance and Rutland. A week later she ran at Wolverhampton Racecourse where she finished unplaced behind Traveller in the Holyoake Stakes. At the end of the month, Tarantella returned to Worcester for her final race, a Ladies' Purse run in two mile heats in which her only opponent was a colt named Chance. Tarantella won the first heat and was allowed to walk over in the second when the colt was withdrawn.

== Stud record ==
Tarantella was retired from racing to become a broodmare at her owner's stud, where she produced the Ascot Derby winner The Miser Scarve. In 1840 Tarantella was sold to Auguste Lupin and was exported to France where she had considerable success. Her sons Gambetti and Amalfi (both sired by Young Emilius) won the Prix du Jockey Club in 1848 and 1851 respectively.

== Pedigree ==
Pedigree of Tarantella (GB), chestnut mare, 1830
| Sire Tramp (GB) 1810 | Dick Andrews; 1797 | Joe Andrews | Eclipse |
| Sire Tramp (GB) 1810 | Dick Andrews; 1797 | Joe Andrews | Amaranda |
| Sire Tramp (GB) 1810 | Dick Andrews; 1797 | Highflyer mare | Highflyer |
| Sire Tramp (GB) 1810 | Dick Andrews; 1797 | Highflyer mare | Cardinal Puff mare |
| Sire Tramp (GB) 1810 | Gohanna mare 1803 | Gohanna | Mercury |
| Sire Tramp (GB) 1810 | Gohanna mare 1803 | Gohanna | Dundas' Herod mare |
| Sire Tramp (GB) 1810 | Gohanna mare 1803 | Fraxinella | Trentham |
| Sire Tramp (GB) 1810 | Gohanna mare 1803 | Fraxinella | Woodpecker mare |
| Dam Katherine (GB) 1821 | Soothsayer; 1808 | Sorcerer | Trumpator |
| Dam Katherine (GB) 1821 | Soothsayer; 1808 | Sorcerer | Young Giantess |
| Dam Katherine (GB) 1821 | Soothsayer; 1808 | Golden Locks | Delpini |
| Dam Katherine (GB) 1821 | Soothsayer; 1808 | Golden Locks | Violet |
| Dam Katherine (GB) 1821 | Quadrille; 1815 | Selim | Buzzard |
| Dam Katherine (GB) 1821 | Quadrille; 1815 | Selim | Alexander mare |
| Dam Katherine (GB) 1821 | Quadrille; 1815 | Canary Bird | Sorcerer |
| Dam Katherine (GB) 1821 | Quadrille; 1815 | Canary Bird | Canary (Family 22) |
