= James Robinson (jockey) =

British jockey

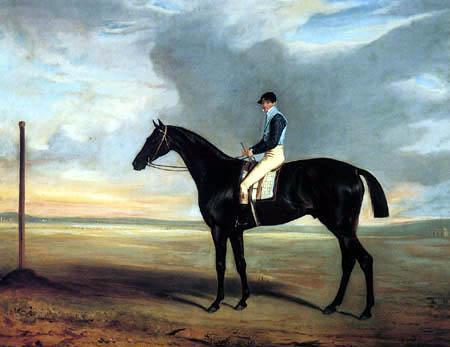
- Robinson and Cadland in 1828

Personal information
- Born: 22 June 1794 Great Britain
- Died: 15 January 1873 (aged 78)
- Occupation: Jockey

Horse racing career
- Sport: Horse racing

Major racing wins
- British Classic Race wins as jockey: 2000 Guineas (9); 1000 Guineas (5); Epsom Derby (6); Epsom Oaks (2); St Leger Stakes (2)

Significant horses
- Azor, Cadland, Glencoe, Bay Middleton, Cobweb, Zoe, Charlotte West, Cedric, Mameluke, Camarine, Middleton.

James Robinson (1794–1873) was a British Jockey. In a riding career which lasted until 1852 he rode the winners of 24 British Classic Races. His six wins in The Derby set a record which was not surpassed until Lester Piggott won his seventh Derby in 1976. His record of nine wins in the 2000 Guineas remains unequaled. Robinson, who was often known as "Jem", retired from riding after an injury in 1852 and died in 1873.

== Background ==
Robinson was born at Newmarket, Suffolk. His father, John (d1845), was a trainer, while his older brother, also John (d1863), prepared Tarantella to win the 1833 1,000 Guineas. His half-brother, Tom Robinson (d1875), rode the first and third winners of the Prix du Jockey Club. Jem Robinson was apprenticed at the stable of Robert Robson at Newmarket where he remained for thirteen years and he was trained in race riding by Frank Buckle.

== Riding career ==
Robinson developed a riding style which saw him employ a low, crouching posture, especially in a finish. This was closer to the modern style introduced to England by American riders such as Tod Sloan at the end of the century and in contrast to most jockeys of the time who tended to sit "bolt upright". Even by the standards of his time, Robinson made frequent and vigorous use of the whip, leaving some of his mounts bleeding. One horse named Ardrossan was so affected that he later attacked Robinson on the training gallops and the jockey narrowly escaped serious injury.

Robinson recorded his first major win when he won the 1817 Derby on Azor, a horse who had been entered in the race to make the pace for a more fancied stable companion. In 1824 he won both the Derby (on Cedric) and the Oaks Stakes (on Augusta) in the same week as his marriage to a Miss Powell. He won the Derby again on Middleton in 1825 and Mameluke in 1827. In 1828 he rode the 2000 Guineas winner Cadland to a dead heat with the Yorkshire-trained The Colonel in the Derby. The race was decided by a run-off which saw Robinson comprehensively outride the leading Northern jockey Bill Scott to take the race for the fifth time. Robinson rode his last Derby winner in 1836, when he partnered Bay Middleton to a two length win over Bill Scott on Gladiator.

In 1852 Robinson was injured in a fall at Newmarket when a two-year-old colt named Feramorz swerved at the start of a match race. Robinson's stirrup leather snapped and he was thrown from the horse fracturing his left femur, collar bone and several ribs. The leg injury did not heal properly leaving him unable to ride and forcing him into retirement.

== Retirement ==
Robinson used most of his earnings from riding to build a training yard at Newmarket. He showed little interest in running the stable, spending much of his time socialising in London. He gave away much of his remaining money to friends and was only saved from poverty later in life by the support of the Dukes of Rutland and Bedford. Robinson died at his home at Rutland Place, Newmarket, in 1873 and was buried in Newmarket cemetery.
