= Liverpool (horse) =

British Thoroughbred racehorse

- Sire: Tramp
- Grandsire: Dick Andrews
- Dam: Whisker mare
- Damsire: Whisker
- Sex: Stallion
- Foaled: 1828
- Country: Great Britain
- Colour: Bay
- Record: 14, 8-2-0

Major wins
- Port Stakes (1832)

Liverpool (1828 – 1844) was a British racehorse and sire. He helped continue the Tramp sire line through his son Lanercost.

== Background ==
Liverpool was bred at the Bishop Burton stud of Richard Watt in Yorkshire.

== Racing career ==
Liverpool was lightly raced due to having small feet for his size. After racing once as a juvenile in 1830, he won his first race as a three year old in 1831. His next win was a head-to-head match with Chorister where he ended in a dead heat, and then won a run-off by a about a length. In 1832, he won the Port Stakes. In 1833, he won the York Spring Gold Cup and the Stanley Stakes.

== Stud career ==
Notable offspring:

- Lanercost (1835) - 22 wins in 40 starts including the Ascot Gold Cup
- Sir Abstrupus (1840) - won Steward's Cup in 1844

== Sire line tree ==
- Liverpool
  - Lanercost
    - Crozier
    - Mr Martin
      - Day And Martin
    - Van Tromp
      - Ivan
        - Blue Peter
          - Sailor
        - Union Jack
        - Selim
        - Fichu
        - Vanichka
      - Vandal
      - Van Galen
        - Tim Whiffler
        - Ploughboy
        - Van Amburgh
      - Vandermulin
      - Viscomte
        - Hidalgo
        - Grom
      - Van Dyck
        - Vadim
        - Lanercost
      - Walerij
      - Vancouver
        - Koncept
    - War Eagle
    - The Swiss Boy
    - Garrick
    - Loup Garou
      - The Coroner
      - Lambourn
    - Musician
    - Bonnie Dundee
    - Colsterdale
      - Young Rapid
      - Sledmere
        - Penrose
      - Lecturer
        - Carnelion
        - Owen
        - The Englishman
    - De Ruyter
      - Foam
    - Pantomime
    - Cosmopolite
    - Gouvieux
    - Gustave
  - Malvolio
  - The Commodore
  - Liverpool Junior
    - Meaux
  - Nawworth
  - Moss Trooper
  - A British Yeoman
    - Baroda
    - Bridegroom
  - Sir Abstrupus
  - Idas
  - Birkenhead
    - New Brighton
  - Liverpool

== Pedigree ==
Pedigree of Liverpool (GB), bay horse, 1828
| Sire Tramp (GB) 1810 | Dick Andrews; 1797 | Joe Andrews | Eclipse*^ |
| Sire Tramp (GB) 1810 | Dick Andrews; 1797 | Joe Andrews | Amaranda |
| Sire Tramp (GB) 1810 | Dick Andrews; 1797 | Highflyer mare | Highflyer |
| Sire Tramp (GB) 1810 | Dick Andrews; 1797 | Highflyer mare | Cardinal Puff mare |
| Sire Tramp (GB) 1810 | Gohanna mare 1803 | Gohanna | Mercury |
| Sire Tramp (GB) 1810 | Gohanna mare 1803 | Gohanna | Herod mare |
| Sire Tramp (GB) 1810 | Gohanna mare 1803 | Fraxinella | Trentham*^ |
| Sire Tramp (GB) 1810 | Gohanna mare 1803 | Fraxinella | Woodpecker mare |
| Dam Whisker mare (GB) 1803 | Whisker; 1812 | Waxy | Potoooooooo*^ |
| Dam Whisker mare (GB) 1803 | Whisker; 1812 | Waxy | Maria |
| Dam Whisker mare (GB) 1803 | Whisker; 1812 | Penelope | Trumpator |
| Dam Whisker mare (GB) 1803 | Whisker; 1812 | Penelope | Prunella |
| Dam Whisker mare (GB) 1803 | Mandane; 1800 | Potoooooooo* | Eclipse*^ |
| Dam Whisker mare (GB) 1803 | Mandane; 1800 | Potoooooooo* | Sportsmistress |
| Dam Whisker mare (GB) 1803 | Mandane; 1800 | Young Camilla | Woodpecker |
| Dam Whisker mare (GB) 1803 | Mandane; 1800 | Young Camilla | Camilla*^ |

* Liverpool is inbred 4D x 3D to the stallion Potoooooooo, meaning that he appears fourth generation and third generation on the dam side of his pedigree.

*^ Liverpool is inbred 4S × 5D x 4D to the stallion Eclipse, meaning that he appears fourth generation on the sire side of his pedigree and fifth generation (via Potoooooooo)^ and fourth generation on the dam side of his pedigree.

*^ Liverpool is inbred 4S × 5D to the stallion Trentham, meaning that he appears fourth generation on the sire side of his pedigree and fifth generation (via Camilla)^ on the dam side of his pedigree.
