= Barefoot (horse) =

British-bred Thoroughbred racehorse

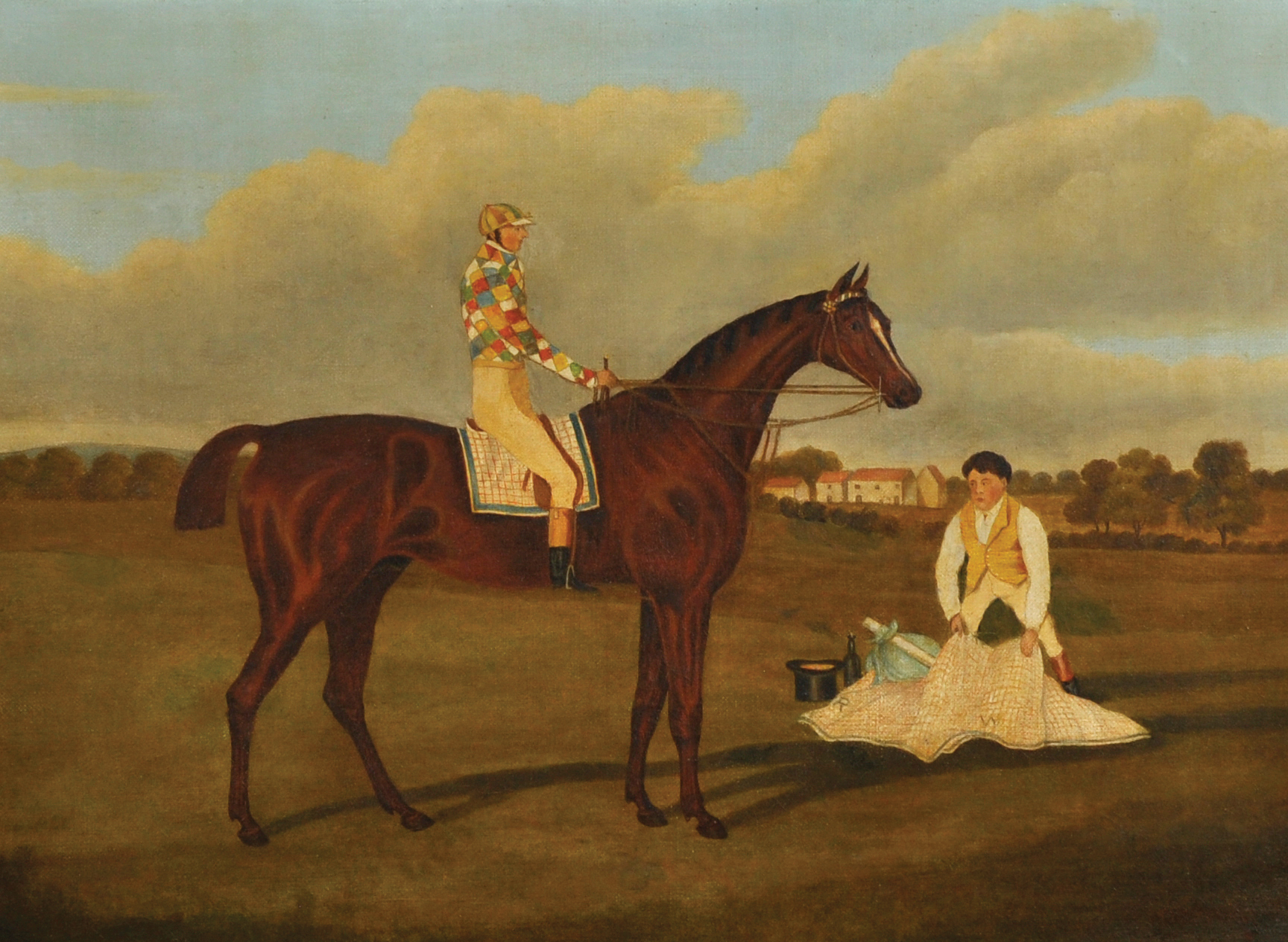
- Barefoot. 1823. After John Frederick Herring Sr.
- Sire: Tramp
- Grandsire: Dick Andrews
- Dam: Rosamond
- Damsire: Buzzard
- Sex: Stallion
- Foaled: 1820
- Country: United Kingdom
- Colour: Chestnut
- Breeder: Richard Watt
- Owner: Richard Watt; William Vane, 1st Duke of Cleveland
- Trainer: Richard Shepherd; William Chifney
- Record: 20: 10-6-2

Major wins
- Spring St Leger (1823); Great St Leger Stakes (1823); Swinley Stakes (1824); Lancaster Gold Cup (1825, 1826)

Barefoot (1820–1840) was a British Thoroughbred racehorse and sire best known for winning a chaotic and controversial race for the classic St Leger Stakes in 1823. Bred and originally trained in Yorkshire, Barefoot was beaten on his debut but began a seven race winning sequence when successful in a minor race at Pontefract in September 1822. As a three-year-old he was unbeaten in five starts including the Spring St Leger at York and the Great St Leger at Doncaster. In the latter event, he finished second in a race which was declared void after a false start before winning a re-run. Barefoot was later sold to William Vane, 1st Duke of Cleveland and competed for three further seasons with mixed results, his best efforts being wins in the Lancaster Gold Cups of 1825 and 1826. After his retirement from racing he was exported to the United States where he had limited success as a sire of winners before dying as a result of a snake bite in 1840.

== Background ==
Barefoot was a chestnut horse with a white star and snip bred by George Crompton in Yorkshire. He was described as standing 15.2 hands high, and being powerful, muscular, active and high-spirited. He was sired by Tramp, who won several important races in 1813 and 1814 and went on to become a very successful stallion, siring other important winners including The Derby winners St. Giles and Dangerous. Barefoot began his racing career in the ownership of Crompton's associate Richard Watt of Bishop Burton

== Racing career ==
=== 1822: two-year-old season ===
Barefoot made his racecourse debut on 14 May at York Racecourse. He started 8/11 favourite for a sweepstakes in which he finished second to Mr Orde Powlett's filly Miss Fanny. Barefoot did not appear again until 5 September when he ran in a seven furlong sweepstakes at Pontefract Racecourse. Ridden by J Garbutt, he won the race from Sir W. Milner's colt Harpooner.

=== 1823: three-year-old season ===
Barefoot made his first appearance as a three-year-old at York Racecourse on 19 May when he contested the "Spring St Leger Stakes". The success of the St Leger at Doncaster had led other major courses, including York and Newmarket to use the name for their own long-distance races for three-year-olds; the original race was renamed the "Great St Leger" for several years to distinguish itself from the imitators. Barefoot started favourite and won "cleverly" from Sir Anthony and Harpooner. He returned to York in August when he won a ten furlong sweepstakes for three-year-olds "very easy", beating Mr Richardson's unnamed colt at odds of 4/5. On 2 September Barefoot appeared at Pontefract and won a sweepstakes from his only opponent, a filly named Palatine.

Thirteen days after his win at Pontefract, Barefoot was one of twenty-seven colts and fillies to contest the Great St Leger at Doncaster Racecourse. He was the 13/1 fourth choice in the betting behind Tinker, Sherwood and Mr Peirse's unnamed colt sired by Comus out of the mare Rosanne ("the Rosanne colt"^{[1]}). With no starting stalls or barriers, large fields of runners were difficult to manage and there were two false starts after which the horses were successfully recalled. On the third false start however, most of the jockeys (including Tom Goodisson on Barefoot) either ignored the starter, or failed to notice the recall signal. Twenty three horses ran the complete course, with the Rosanne colt "winning" by a head from Barefoot (who appeared unlucky in running) with the outsider Comte d'Artois in third. When the racecourse stewards ordered the race to be re-run, fifteen of those who had completed the course were withdrawn by their owners and trainers. The remaining twelve horses were joined by the four who had been left behind at the start for the new race, and after much confusion the Rosanne colt started 5/2 favourite ahead of Barefoot on 4/1. Barefoot took the lead a quarter of a mile from the finish and won very easily by two lengths from Sherwood, with Comte d'Artois again taking third.

Shortly after his St Leger win, Barefoot was sold by Watt to Lord Darlington, later to become the 1st Duke of Cleveland. Barefoot raced outside Yorkshire for the first time when he made his first appearance for his new owner at Newmarket Racecourse on 28 October. He was assigned top weight of 122 Pound, which meant that he had to concede thirteen pounds to the 2000 Guineas winner Nicolo, who was made favourite. Ridden by Sam Chifney, Barefoot won by two lengths from Tressilian, a five-year-old carrying 119 pounds, with Nicolo unplaced. At the end of the season, Lord Darlington issued a challenge to the owners of the Derby winner Emilius for a 2000 guinea match race between their horse and Barefoot, but the offer was not accepted.

=== 1824: four-year-old season ===
In 1824 Barefoot was based at Newmarket, Suffolk, probably at the stable of William Chifney. His training was delayed at the start of the year when he fell in an exercise gallop, sustaining serious injuries to both his knees. Barefoot eventually began his third season with three engagements at Royal Ascot in June, beginning with a walkover in the one and a half mile Swinley Stakes which took his winning run to seven. On the following afternoon he started 4/7 favourite for the two and a half mile Ascot Gold Cup, but was defeated by Lord George Cavendish's colt Bizarre, his only opponent. A day later, Barefoot turned out again for the Wokingham Stakes a six furlong handicap race and started favourite despite carrying top weight of 135 pounds. Barefoot finished unplaced but in a repetition of the St Leger incident the result was declared void after a false start. On this occasion, Barefoot's owner declined to take part in the re-run.

In September, Barefoot returned to the scene of his greatest success for two runs at Doncaster. He finished third to Arrogance in a four-mile King's Plate and was beaten by Lottery in a sweepstakes over the St Leger course.

=== 1825: five-year-old season ===
On 29 June, Barefoot was made his first appearance as a five-year-old when he was sent to Lancaster Racecourse, for the three-mile Lancaster Gold Cup. Ridden by H Edwards, he started at odds of 2/1 and won from Lottery, the betting favourite. A month later Barefoot started favourite for the Gold Cup at Derby Racecourse, but finished third behind Sir Gray and Canteen, and in August he finished second to the gelding Euphrates in the Cup at Darlington. On his only other appearance, in October, he failed to concede twenty-seven pounds to Alderman, his only opponent in the two-mile Northallerton Gold Cup.

=== 1826: six-year-old season ===
Barefoot's final season began on 29 March when he finished unplaced behind Lord Kelburne's colt Dare-Devil in the Craven Stakes at Catterick Bridge Racecourse. Twelve days later, Lord Darlington paid a £150 forfeit when Barefoot failed to appear for a two-mile match race against Lord Exeter's colt Zealot at Newmarket. On 17 May at Manchester Racecourse Barefoot carried top weight of 126 pounds to victory in a two-mile handicap, and in June he recorded his last win when he took a second Lancaster Gold Cup. In August, Barefoot started 5/2 second favourite for adivision of the Great Subscription Purse at York, but finished last of the four runners behind Confederate. A week later, Barefoot ended his racing career by finishing second to Canteen in the Gold Cup at Stockton-on-Tees Racecourse.

== Stud career ==
At the end of his racing career, Barefoot was sold to Admiral Sir Isaac Coffin and exported to the United States. He stood as a breeding stallion at various studs in Massachusetts, New York, New England, Virginia, Kentucky and Tennessee but was not a great success although some of his daughters became successful broodmares. Barefoot died from a snake bite at Tipton County, Tennessee, in 1840.

== Pedigree ==
Pedigree of Barefoot (GB), chestnut stallion, 1820
Sire Tramp (GB) 1810	Dick Andrews; 1797	Joe Andrews	Eclipse*
Sire Tramp (GB) 1810	Dick Andrews; 1797	Joe Andrews	Amaranda
Sire Tramp (GB) 1810	Dick Andrews; 1797	Highflyer mare (1790)	Highflyer*^
Sire Tramp (GB) 1810	Dick Andrews; 1797	Highflyer mare (1790)	Cardinal Puff mare
Sire Tramp (GB) 1810	Gohanna mare 1803	Gohanna	Mercury*^
Sire Tramp (GB) 1810	Gohanna mare 1803	Gohanna	Dundas' Herod mare*^
Sire Tramp (GB) 1810	Gohanna mare 1803	Fraxinella	Trentham
Sire Tramp (GB) 1810	Gohanna mare 1803	Fraxinella	Woodpecker mare
Dam Rosamond (GB) 1798	Buzzard; 1787	Woodpecker	Herod*
Dam Rosamond (GB) 1798	Buzzard; 1787	Woodpecker	Miss Ramsden
Dam Rosamond (GB) 1798	Buzzard; 1787	Misfortune	Dux*^
Dam Rosamond (GB) 1798	Buzzard; 1787	Misfortune	Curiosity
Dam Rosamond (GB) 1798	Roseberry; 1792	Phoenomenon	Herod*
Dam Rosamond (GB) 1798	Roseberry; 1792	Phoenomenon	Frenzy
Dam Rosamond (GB) 1798	Roseberry; 1792	Miss West	Matchem*
Dam Rosamond (GB) 1798	Roseberry; 1792	Miss West	Regulus mare (Family:5)

*^ Barefoot is inbred 5S x 5S x 4D x 4D to the stallion Herod, meaning that he appears fifth generation twice (via Highflyer and Dundas' Herod mare)^ on the sire side of his pedigree and fourth generation twice on the dam side of his pedigree.

*^ Barefoot is inbred 4S x 5S to the stallion Eclipse, meaning that he appears fourth generation and fifth generation (via Mercury) on the sire side of his pedigree.

*^ Barefoot is inbred 5D x 4D to the stallion Matchem, meaning that he appears fifth generation (via Dux)^ and fourth generation on the dam side of his pedigree.

== Note ==
^{[1]} The Rosanne colt was later named Carnival and won the Great Subscription Purse at York in 1824 but died a year later.
