= St. Giles (horse) =

British-bred Thoroughbred racehorse

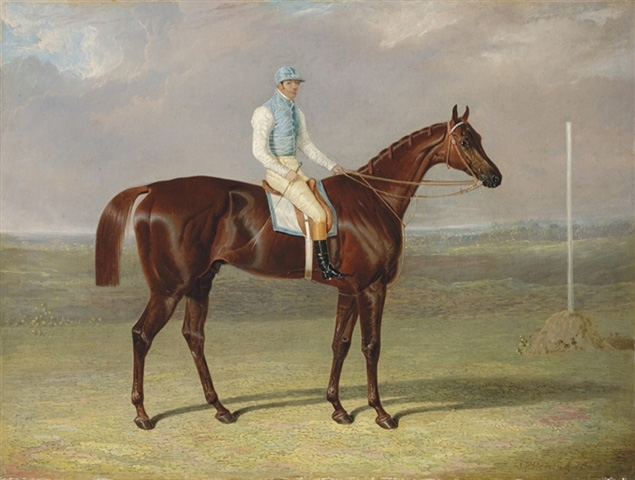
- St. Giles. Painting by John Frederick Herring, Sr.
- Sire: Tramp
- Grandsire: Dick Andrews
- Dam: Arcot Lass
- Damsire: Ardrossan
- Sex: Stallion
- Foaled: 1829
- Country: United Kingdom of Great Britain and Ireland
- Colour: Chestnut
- Breeder: Robert Ridsdale
- Owner: Robert Ridsdale & John Gully
- Trainer: J. Webb; John Barham Day
- Record: 11:5-0-1

Major wins
- Epsom Derby (1832)

St. Giles (1829 – circa 1839) was a British Thoroughbred racehorse and sire. In a career that lasted from October 1831 to July 1835 he ran eleven times and won five races. After showing little form as a two-year-old, he made marked improvement to win his first three races of 1832, culminating with a highly-controversial success in The Derby. His only subsequent wins came in two minor races in 1835 and he was eventually sold and exported to stand as a stallion in the United States.

== Background ==
St. Giles was a dark chestnut horse bred by Mr Cattle, a farmer from Sheriff Hutton in Yorkshire. He was bought from his breeder by Robert Ridsdale, a professional gambler with a reputation for dishonesty and corruption. Ridsdale owned the colt in partnership with John Gully, a former champion prize-fighter and gambler who went on to become a Member of Parliament.

St. Giles was sired by Tramp, who won several important races in 1813 and 1814 and went on to become a very successful stallion, siring important winners including Dangerous (Epsom Derby) and Barefoot (St Leger). St. Giles's dam, Arcot Lass was one of the few mares to produce two Derby winners, being also the dam of Bloomsbury.

== Racing career ==
=== 1831: two-year-old season ===
St. Giles was unnamed and ran as "Mr. Ridsdale's ch. c. by Tramp out of Arcot Lass" when he made his debut in the Two-Year-Old Plate at Newmarket in October 1831. He started favourite at odds of 5/2 but finished unplaced behind the filly Miss Mary Anne. At the end of the month he returned to Newmarket for the Nursery Stakes, a handicap race over one mile in which he carried 104 pounds. Running for the first time as "St. Giles" he finished fourth of the six runners behind a colt named Gratis.

=== 1832: three-year-old season ===
==== Spring ====
St. Giles showed much improved form in the spring of 1832. In April he defeated the year older filly Lioness by a head in a £100 match race over the Rowley Mile at Newmarket. He carried 112 pounds to the filly's 130, giving him advantage of approximately eight pounds in modern, weight-for-age terms. Three days later he appeared in a handicap race in which he carried top weight of 115 pounds and won "cleverly" from an unnamed grey filly by Middleton. In these races was described as being a "two-year-old", as racehorses at this time had their official "birthdays" on 1 May. From this point on St. Giles began to appear in the betting lists for the Derby. Shortly afterwards Gully purchased one of the Derby favourites Margrave for 2,500 guineas, and St. Giles became the subject of sustained support in the betting, leading to speculation that Gully and Ridsdale intended to manage the result of the race.

==== The Derby ====
At Epsom on 7 June, St. Giles, despite his modest public form, started the 3/1 favourite for the Derby in a field of twenty-two runners. In a series of private trial races, he had proved himself superior to Margrave and Ridsdale's horse Trustee, and both his owners had backed him very heavily. After several false starts, the race got under way with Trustee setting a very strong pace and St. Giles, ridden by Bill Scott, settled in third. By half way, many of the runners were struggling but St. Giles was still going well and turned into the straight in second place. Just over two furlongs from the finish, Scott sent St. Giles past Trustee and into the lead. Although Perion moved strongly into second place, St. Giles was never seriously challenged and won comfortably by two lengths. Trustee held on for third and Gully's Margrave finished fourth. Although the winner was trained at Newmarket, his owner and rider were Yorkshiremen and the race was seen as a victory for the North. Ridsdale, Gully and the bookmaker William Crockford were reported to have taken a combined total of almost £100,000 with Ridsdale alone winning £40,000 in addition to the £2,775 prize money.

==== Controversies ====
The victory of St. Giles was controversial in several ways. His stable companion, Margrave did not appear to have been given a hard race, and both Quarterly Review and the Sporting Review expressed the opinion that he had been held back from winning on Gully's instructions. It was also widely believed that many of the runners had been "made safe", meaning that their jockeys or trainers had been bribed to ensure they did not win. Immediately after the race, the owners of Perion lodged an official objection to the winner, on the grounds that the details of his dam's pedigree had been incorrectly described on his race entry. They went so far as to have posters printed and displayed with the words "ST GILES NOT ENTITLED TO DERBY STAKES!". Three senior members of the Jockey Club were called on to adjudicate and found in favour of Ridsdale. The issue, had in fact, been known for some time, and St Giles' eligibility for the race had been in doubt since his wins at Newmarket. It seems that the Jockey Club took the view that the matter was a minor technicality, and that there had been no intent to deceive. As with other Derby winners of this period such as Mündig (1835), Bloomsbury (1839) and Little Wonder (1840), there appear to have been rumours that St. Giles was actually a four-year-old at the time of his Derby win.

==== After Epsom ====
On his only other start of the season, St. Giles started 5/2 second favourite in a highly anticipated race for the Goodwood Cup in late July. He looked to be traveling well but weakened in the closing stages and finished unplaced behind the 1830 Derby winner Priam. St. Giles had not been entered for the St Leger and a proposed match race at Doncaster against Lord Kelburne's horse Retainer did not take place. His defeat at Goodwood therefore, proved to be his last race for two years.

The partnership between Ridsdale and Gully quickly broke down following a disagreement over money and their relationship ended in a physical altercation at a hunt in November. Gully was eventually prosecuted and obliged to pay damages of £500 for assaulting his former "friend". Ridsdale, despite his massive gambling wins, became insolvent and was forced to sell all his property in 1836.

=== 1834: five-year-old season ===
St. Giles, by now trained by John Barham Day at Danebury, finally reappeared in the Goodwood Cup of 1834 for which he started at odds of 12/1. He finished fourth of the ten runners in a strong field behind Glencoe. On his only other start of the year, St Giles ran in a race at Plymouth, which was to be decided in the old-fashioned way, with the winner being the first to win two heats. St. Giles sustained a bruised foot in the first heat and was withdrawn.

=== 1835: six-year-old season ===
In either 1834 or early 1835, St. Giles was sold to Thomas Kirkby of York and moved to the stable of John Scott at Malton, North Yorkshire. On April 22, 1835, St. Giles recorded his first win for almost three years by beating seven opponents in the eleven furlong Craven Stakes at Catterick. A month later at York Racecourse he started at odds of 1/3 and claimed the one and three quarter mile Stand Purse by winning the first two heats.

In his final race, St. Giles ran in his third Goodwood Cup. On this occasion he started at 5/1 and was among the leaders throughout the race before finishing third to Rockingham and Glaucus.

== Stud career ==
St. Giles was sold to James Jackson of Alabama in 1835 and exported to the United States in September of that year. In 1836, Jackson leased St. Giles to Colonel George Elliott of Tennessee who offered the stallion's services at a fee of $60. He did not stand for the 1837 season because he was "out of condition." While at Elliott's farm for the season of 1837–1838, the normally docile St. Giles developed the habit of biting himself and tearing his own flesh after covering mares. To counteract this problem, sharp prongs were lashed to his sides to prevent him turning his head too far to the side. St. Giles made little impact as a sire and died before 1840.

== Pedigree ==
Pedigree of St. Giles (GB), chestnut stallion, 1829
Sire Tramp(GB) 1810	Dick Andrews; 1797	Joe Andrews	Eclipse
Sire Tramp(GB) 1810	Dick Andrews; 1797	Joe Andrews	Amaranda
Sire Tramp(GB) 1810	Dick Andrews; 1797	Highflyer mare (1790)	Highflyer
Sire Tramp(GB) 1810	Dick Andrews; 1797	Highflyer mare (1790)	Cardinal Puff mare
Sire Tramp(GB) 1810	Gohanna mare 1803	Gohanna	Mercury
Sire Tramp(GB) 1810	Gohanna mare 1803	Gohanna	Dundas' Herod mare
Sire Tramp(GB) 1810	Gohanna mare 1803	Fraxinella	Trentham
Sire Tramp(GB) 1810	Gohanna mare 1803	Fraxinella	Woodpecker mare
Dam Arcot Lass (GB) 1821	Ardrossan; 1809	John Bull	Fortitude
Dam Arcot Lass (GB) 1821	Ardrossan; 1809	John Bull	Xantippe
Dam Arcot Lass (GB) 1821	Ardrossan; 1809	Miss Whip	Volunteer
Dam Arcot Lass (GB) 1821	Ardrossan; 1809	Miss Whip	Wimbleton
Dam Arcot Lass (GB) 1821	Cramlington mare 1817	Cramlington	Pipator
Dam Arcot Lass (GB) 1821	Cramlington mare 1817	Cramlington	Harriet
Dam Arcot Lass (GB) 1821	Cramlington mare 1817	Floyerkin	Stride
Dam Arcot Lass (GB) 1821	Cramlington mare 1817	Floyerkin	Javelin mare (Family:9-c)
