= Tramp (horse) =

British Thoroughbred racehorse

- Sire: Dick Andrews
- Grandsire: Joe Andrews
- Dam: Gohanna mare
- Damsire: Gohanna
- Sex: Stallion
- Foaled: 1810
- Country: Great Britain
- Colour: Bay
- Record: 13 starts, 9 wins

Tramp (1810 – 1835) was a British racehorse who won 9 races from 13 starts, and was a successful sire. He was thought to be an excellent four-mile horse.

== Background ==
Tramp was bred in Yorkshire by Richard Watt of Bishop Burton.

== Racing career ==
Tramp raced from 1813 to 1814, winning 9 of 13 races.

== Stud career ==
Notable offspring:

- Barefoot (1820) - won St Leger Stakes
- Trampoline (1825) - dam of successful sire Glencoe
- Charlotte West (1827) - won 1000 Guineas Stakes
- St Giles (1829) - won Epsom Derby
- Tarantella (1830) - won 1000 Guineas Stakes
- Dangerous (1830) - won Epsom Derby

== Sire line tree ==
- Tramp
  - Bay Burton
  - Barefoot
    - Ajax
    - Tramp
  - Lottery
    - Chorister
    - Consul
      - Hamlet
      - Joe Chalmers
    - Tetotum
    - Lottery
    - Satin
      - Septimus
        - Porus
    - Saturn
      - Idle Boy
        - Pretty Boy
    - Alteruter
      - Meudon
    - Inheritor
      - Godfrey
      - The Best Of Three
      - Sheraton
      - Testator
    - Red Rover
    - Zohrab
    - Cavendish
    - Lucifer
    - Luck's All
    - Sheet Anchor
      - Arcanus
      - Sirikol
      - Weatherbit
        - Weathergage
        - Drumour
        - Beadsman
        - Kelpie
        - Uncle Ned
        - Neptunus
        - Beldemonio
        - Brown Bread
        - Fair Wind
        - Mandrake
        - Warlike
      - Collingwood
        - Potenate
        - Sultan
      - The Admiral
      - Malton
        - Sylvain
        - Black Eyes
      - Biron
      - Crown Prince
        - Pride Of Prussia
    - The Carpenter
    - Verulam
      - Vulcan
        - Volcano
      - Grimston
      - Wanderer
  - Brother to Bay Burton
  - Speculation
    - Exchange
  - Zinganee
    - Beggarman
      - Morok
    - Alexander Churchill
    - Rothschild
  - Tyke
  - Donegani
  - Little Red Rover
    - Bookworm
      - Glaucus
  - Liverpool
    - Lanercost
      - Crozier
      - Mr Martin
        - Day And Martin
      - Van Tromp
        - Ivan
        - Vandal
        - Van Galen
        - Vandermulin
        - Viscomte
        - Van Dyck
        - Walerij
        - Vancouver
      - War Eagle
      - The Swiss Boy
      - Garrick
      - Loup Garou
        - The Coroner
        - Lambourn
      - Musician
      - Bonnie Dundee
      - Colsterdale
        - Young Rapid
        - Sledmere
        - Lecturer
      - De Ruyter
        - Foam
      - Pantomime
      - Cosmopolite
      - Gouvieux
      - Gustave
    - Malvolio
    - The Commodore
    - Liverpool Junior
      - Meaux
    - Nawworth
    - Moss Trooper
    - A British Yeoman
      - Baroda
      - Bridegroom
    - Sir Abstrupus
    - Idas
    - Birkenhead
      - New Brighton
    - Liverpool
  - St Giles
  - Dangerous
  - Scroggins
  - Cornborough

== Pedigree ==
Pedigree of Tramp (GB), bay horse, 1810
Sire Dick Andrews (GB) 1797	Joe Andrews; 1778	Ecipse*	Marske
Sire Dick Andrews (GB) 1797	Joe Andrews; 1778	Ecipse*	Spilletta
Sire Dick Andrews (GB) 1797	Joe Andrews; 1778	Amaranda	Omnium
Sire Dick Andrews (GB) 1797	Joe Andrews; 1778	Amaranda	Cloudy
Sire Dick Andrews (GB) 1797	Highflyer mare 1790	Highflyer	Herod*
Sire Dick Andrews (GB) 1797	Highflyer mare 1790	Highflyer	Rachel
Sire Dick Andrews (GB) 1797	Highflyer mare 1790	Cardinal Puff mare	Cardinal Puff
Sire Dick Andrews (GB) 1797	Highflyer mare 1790	Cardinal Puff mare	Tatler mare
Dam Gohanna mare (GB) 1803	Gohanna; 1790	Mercury	Eclipse*
Dam Gohanna mare (GB) 1803	Gohanna; 1790	Mercury	Tartar mare
Dam Gohanna mare (GB) 1803	Gohanna; 1790	Herod mare	Herod*
Dam Gohanna mare (GB) 1803	Gohanna; 1790	Herod mare	Maiden
Dam Gohanna mare (GB) 1803	Fraxinella; 1793	Trentham	Sweepstakes
Dam Gohanna mare (GB) 1803	Fraxinella; 1793	Trentham	Miss South
Dam Gohanna mare (GB) 1803	Fraxinella; 1793	Woodpecker mare	Woodpecker*^
Dam Gohanna mare (GB) 1803	Fraxinella; 1793	Woodpecker mare	Everlasting

* Tramp is inbred 3S x 4D to the stallion Eclipse, meaning that he appears third generation on the sire side of his pedigree and fourth generation on the dam side of his pedigree.

*^ Tramp is inbred 4S × 4D x 5D to the stallion Herod, meaning that he appears fourth generation on the sire side of his pedigree and fourth generation and fifth generation (via Woodpecker)^ on the dam side of his pedigree.
