= Riddlesworth Stakes =

Horse race in England

- Location: Abington Mile; Newmarket, England
- Inaugurated: 1815
- Race type: Flat / Thoroughbred

Race information
- Distance: 1 mile (1,609 metres)
- Surface: Turf
- Qualification: Three-year-olds

The Riddlesworth Stakes was a flat horse race in Great Britain open to three-year-olds. It was run on the Abington Mile at Newmarket over a distance of 1 mile (1,609 metres), and was scheduled to take place each year in early or mid April on the Monday of the Craven meeting.

In its early years the race was considered one of the great stakes races of the British racing season and was as important and prestigious as the races now known as the British Classic Races. In most years it carried more prize money than either the 1000 Guineas or the 2000 Guineas. The race underwent several modifications in its history. From 1820 until 1823 it was run as two separate races, one for colts and one for fillies. From 1834 a second Riddlesworth Stakes was run on the Tuesday of the Craven meeting. After the 1830s the race declined in importance.

== Winners to 1841 ==
Year	Winner	Jockey	Trainer	Owner	Odds
1815	Sir Joshua			Mr Neville	2/1
1816	Nectar	Bill Arnull	Dixon Boyce	Lord George Cavendish	2/1
1817	Young Wizard			Mr Christopher Wilson
1818	Prince Paul		James Edwards	Sir John Shelley	5/2
1819	Blue Stockings			Thomas Grosvenor	7/2
1820 colts	Pindarrie		Robert Robson	4th Duke of Grafton	30/1
1820 fillies	Emmeline			5th Duke of Rutland	1/3
1821 colts	Rosicrucian			Mr Batson	15/1
1821 fillies	Ibla			John Udney	4/1
1822 colts	Wanton	Bill Arnull		3rd Earl of Egremont	2/1
1822 fillies	Posthuma	S. Barnard	Robert Robson	4th Duke of Grafton	3/1
1823 colts	Emilius	Francis Buckle	Robert Robson	John Udney	5/4
1823 fillies	Spermaceti	Bill Arnull		Charles Wyndham	1/2
1824	Rebecca	Francis Buckle	Robert Robson	4th Duke of Grafton	4/1
1825	Rufus	Francis Buckle	Robert Robson	4th Duke of Grafton	4/6
1826	The Moslem	Will Wheatley		1st Earl of Verulam	11/8
1827	Glenartney	G. Edwards	James Edwards	5th Earl of Jersey	3/1
1828	Varro	John Barham Day	Robert Robson	4th Duke of Portland	10/1
1829	Patron	F. Boyce	Charles Marson	2nd Marquess of Exeter	7/2
1830	Priam	Francis Buckle	William Chifney	William Chifney	5/6
1831	Riddlesworth	G. Edwards	James Edwards	5th Earl of Jersey	1/2
1832	Somnambule	Boyce		5th Duke of Richmond	4/1
1833	Lucius	James Robinson	James Edwards	5th Earl of Jersey
1834 Monday	Viator	Will Wheatley		John Gully	7/4
1834 Tuesday	Glencoe	James Robinson	James Edwards	5th Earl of Jersey	1/2
1835 Monday	Oak-Apple	James Robinson		Marquess of Tavistock	8/11
1835 Tuesday	Ibrahim	James Robinson	James Edwards	5th Earl of Jersey	1/6
1836 Monday	Bay Middleton	James Robinson	James Edwards	5th Earl of Jersey	5/6
1836 Tuesday	Muezzin	Conolly		2nd Marquess of Exeter	7/2
1837 Monday	Achmet	James Robinson	James Edwards	5th Earl of Jersey	6/5
1837 Tuesday	Troilus	Conolly		2nd Marquess of Exeter	3/1
1838 Monday	Phoenix	James Robinson	James Edwards	5th Earl of Jersey	1/2
1838 Tuesday	Mecca	S. Darling		2nd Marquess of Exeter	4/6
1839 Monday	Caesar	James Robinson	James Edwards	5th Earl of Jersey	1/2
1839 Tuesday	Ilderim	James Robinson	James Edwards	5th Earl of Jersey	1/4
1840 Monday	The Ant	William Scott		6th Earl of Chesterfield	2/1
1840 Tuesday	Billow	James Robinson		Duke of Bedford	1/4
1841 Monday	Eringo			Thomas Thornhill	2/1
1841 Tuesday	Wahab	John Day		Mr Wreford	4/11
