= Trampoline (horse) =

British-bred Thoroughbred racehorse

- Sire: Tramp
- Grandsire: Dick Andrews
- Dam: Web
- Damsire: Waxy
- Sex: Mare
- Foaled: 1825
- Country: United Kingdom
- Colour: Chestnut
- Breeder: George Child-Villiers, 5th Earl of Jersey

Trampoline (born 1825) was a Thoroughbred racehorse. Her most notable accomplishment was foaling the great sire, Glencoe.

Trampoline was dammed by Tramp, who produced various racing winners and sires, including Lottery. Web, the dam of Trampoline, was also granddam to the 1,000 Guineas and Epsom Oaks winner Cobweb, through her daughter Filagree.

Trampoline placed second in the 1,000 Guineas, before winning The Oatlands and the Windsor Forest Stakes, a race for three-year-old fillies. She was retired as a four-year-old in 1829, and sent to Phantom to breed, producing her first foal, Glenmore, in 1830.

Trampoline also produced a daughter, Glencairne (1838, by Sultan), who went on to be a great broodmare. Glencairne is found in the pedigrees of such horses as Gorgo (winner of the Union-Rennen), Cherimoya (winner of the Epsom Oaks), grandson Cameronian (winner of the Epsom Derby and 2,000 Guineas), Brie (winner of the French Oaks), Brisk (winner of the French Oaks), Bernborough, The Oak (winner of the Italian Derby), Alycidon, and the American horses Easy Goer and Sea Hero.

Trampoline's second foal, Glencoe (by Sultan), was perhaps her most famous son.

Trampoline was half-sister to Middleton, a chestnut colt by Phantom and a winner of the Derby Stakes.
