= Sultan (horse) =

British-bred Thoroughbred racehorse

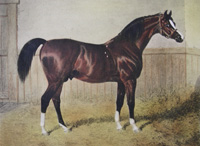
- Sire: Selim
- Grandsire: Buzzard
- Dam: Bacchante
- Damsire: Williamson's Ditto
- Sex: Stallion
- Foaled: 1816
- Country: Great Britain
- Colour: Bay
- Breeder: Mr. Crockford
- Owner: Brownlow Cecil, 2nd Marquess of Exeter

Awards
- Leading sire in Great Britain and Ireland
- Last updated on 19 February 2010

Sultan (1816-) was a British-bred Thoroughbred racehorse and a leading sire in Great Britain and Ireland for six successive seasons.

== Breeding ==
He was by Selim (sire of six classics winners), out of Bacchante by Williamson's Ditto. Sultan was inbred to three great sires, Herod (4m x 4f), Eclipse (4m x 4f), and Herod's best son, Highflyer (4 x 4). Sultan was a bay with a blaze, a sock on the off (right) fore and near (left) hind, and a stocking near the fore and off the hind leg. He had a refined, beautiful head, well-sprung ribs, deep girth, and muscular, powerful hindquarters. Although he was a long horse he was a good weight carrier and sound, racing until the age of eight.

== Racing career ==
Sultan had a good race record, winning 14 times. As a two-year-old, racing for Crockford, he placed third in the July Stakes, and second in the Derby Stakes, losing to Tiresias. He was one of the favorites in the St. Leger Stakes, but broke down in his morning gallop before the race. As a four-year-old, he placed second in the Port Stakes. When he was five, he won the Gold Cup at Newmarket Racecourse. He beat Gustavus (a Derby winner) in a match race as a six-year-old.

When he was seven, Sultan was purchased by Lord Exeter. Racing for him, the stallion won the Trial Stakes for a second time, another race at Newmarket, which was his preferred venue for running.

== Stud record ==
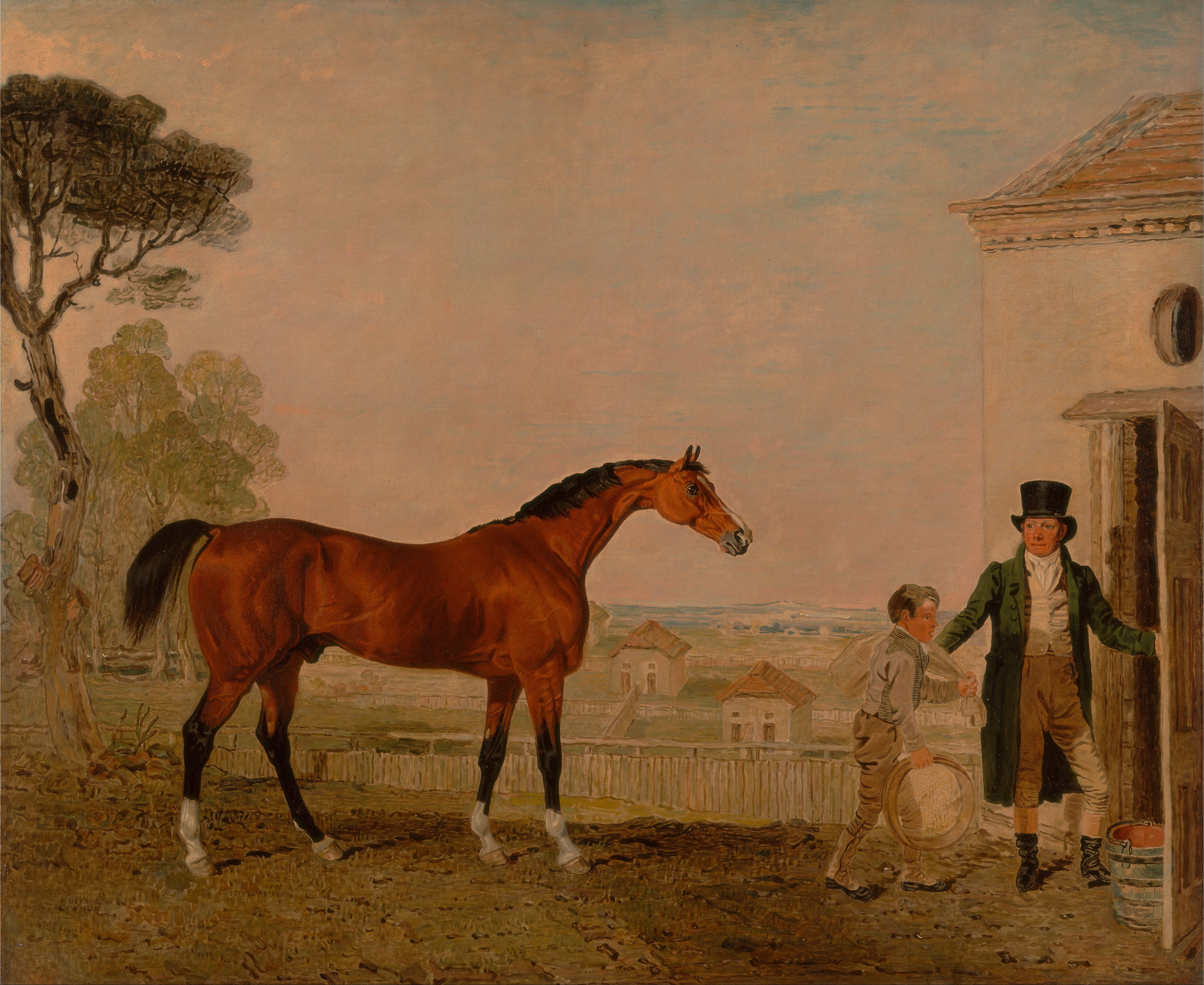
Sultan at the Marquess of Exeter's Stud, Burghley House

Sultan was then retired to the Marquis' stud farm at Burghley. He went on to be the leading sire in Great Britain & Ireland for six consecutive years (1832-1837).

Foaled	Name	Sex	Major Wins/Achievements
1826	Green Mantle	Mare	Epsom Oaks
1827	Augustus	Stallion	2000 Guineas Stakes
1829	Galata	Mare	1000 Guineas Stakes, Epsom Oaks
1831	Glencoe I	Stallion	2000 Guineas Stakes
1832	Ibrahim	Stallion	2000 Guineas Stakes
1833	Bay Middleton	Stallion	2000 Guineas Stakes, Epsom Derby
1833	Destiny	Mare	1000 Guineas Stakes
1834	Achmet		2000 Guineas Stakes

Sultan, a tail-male descendant of Herod, maintained the Byerley Turk sire line through to Djebel and to the present.

== Sire line tree ==
- Sultan
  - Augustus
  - Mahmoud
  - Hoemus
  - Beiram
    - Phlegon
      - Leopold
      - Phaeton
  - Alpheus
    - Evenus
  - Despot
    - Hooton
      - Brill
  - Divan
  - Ishmael
    - Ilderim
    - Ishmaelite
      - Herold
    - Dr Jenner
      - Vaccination
    - Hambledon
    - The Star of Erin
    - Abd El Kader
    - Burgundy
      - Old Malt
      - Shanbally
  - Glencoe
    - Thornhill
    - Winnebago
    - Glencoe (Howard)
    - Union
    - Highlander
      - Everlasting
    - Star Davis
      - Jerome Edger
      - Metaire
      - Day Star
    - Darby
    - Vandal
      - Jack the Barber
        - John Bell
        - Fearnaught
      - Revill
      - Volscian
      - Therit
      - Virgil
        - Vagrant
        - Vigil
        - Virginius
        - Hindoo
        - Van Buren
        - Carley B
        - Vanguard
        - Isaac Murphy
        - Ben Ali
        - Tremont
      - Pompey Payne
      - Versailles
        - Ira E Bride
      - Survivor
      - Council Bluffs
      - Vagabond
        - Judge Morrow
      - Vicksburg
      - Voltigeur
        - Princeton
    - Frankfort
    - Little Arthur
    - Pryor
    - Bay Dick
      - Bay Wood
    - Bonnie Laddie
    - Foreigner
    - Nicholas I
    - France
      - King Bird
    - Glencoe Jr
    - Walnut
    - O'Meara
    - Trumpeter
      - Young Trumpeter
    - Glencoe (Hunter)
    - Panic
  - Aurelius
  - Caliph
  - Ibrahim
  - Bay Middleton
    - Aristides
    - Bramble
    - Farintosh
    - Gaper
    - Baveno
    - Bay Momus
    - Pastoral
      - Collingwood
    - The-Devil-To-Pay
    - Best Bower
    - Cowl
      - The Confessor
        - Cock-a-Hoop
      - The Friar
      - The Grand Inquisitor
    - Joy
    - Gabbler
    - Planet
      - Aster
    - Honeycomb
    - The Flying Dutchman
      - Ellington
        - Delight
        - Montgoubert
      - Fly-By-Night
      - Peter Wilkens
        - The Quack
        - Benvolio
      - Flying Pieman
        - Old England
      - Ignoramus
        - Ignorant
      - Purston
        - Sir Watkin
      - Amsterdam
      - Duneany
      - Glenbuck
      - The Rover
      - Cape Flyaway
        - Good Hope
      - Tom Bowline
        - Make Haste
      - Winton
      - Young Dutchman
      - Ellerton
      - Romulus
      - Walloon
      - Dollar
        - Dami
        - Il Maestro
        - Salvanos
        - Androcles
        - Saint Cyr
        - Salvator
        - Fountainebleau
        - Patriarche
        - Thieusies
        - Greenback
        - Prologue
        - Vignemale
        - Louis D'Or
        - Saumur
        - Cimier
        - Garrick
        - Martin Pecheur
        - Sansonnet
        - The Condor
        - Saint Honore
        - Souci
        - Upas
        - Acheron
        - Bocage
        - Dauphin
        - Cerbere
      - Tourmalet
      - Dutch Skater
        - Insulaire
        - Burgomaster
        - Dutch Roller
        - Sherbrooke
        - Yellow
        - Accumulator
      - Massinissa
      - Jarnac
        - Old Tom
    - Osterley
    - Hesperus
      - Sir Birtram
      - Diomedes
        - Parawhenua
        - Kakupo
    - St Aubyn
    - Barbatus
    - Vanderdecken
    - Andover
      - Craymond
        - Harmonium
        - Post Haste
      - Walkington
    - The Hermit
      - Freetrader
    - Autocrat
    - Bessus
    - Milton
    - Anton
  - Hampton
    - Leaconfield
  - Achmet
  - Adrian
  - Dardanelles
  - Hibiscus
  - Jereed
    - Great Heart
    - Nat
    - The Bishop of Romford's Cob
    - The Free Lance
  - Sultan Jr
  - Wisdom
  - Caesar
  - Clarion
  - Kremlin
  - Scutari

== Pedigree ==
Pedigree of Sultan (GB), bay stallion, 1816
Sire Selim 1802	Buzzard; 1787	Woodpecker	Herod*^
Sire Selim 1802	Buzzard; 1787	Woodpecker	Miss Ramsden
Sire Selim 1802	Buzzard; 1787	Misfortune	Dux
Sire Selim 1802	Buzzard; 1787	Misfortune	Curiosity
Sire Selim 1802	Alexander mare 1790	Alexander	Eclipse*
Sire Selim 1802	Alexander mare 1790	Alexander	Grecian Princess
Sire Selim 1802	Alexander mare 1790	Highflyer mare (1780)	Highflyer*^
Sire Selim 1802	Alexander mare 1790	Highflyer mare (1780)	Alfred mare (1775)
Dam Bacchante 1809	Williamson's Ditto; 1800	Sir Peter Teazle	Highflyer*^
Dam Bacchante 1809	Williamson's Ditto; 1800	Sir Peter Teazle	Papillon
Dam Bacchante 1809	Williamson's Ditto; 1800	Arethusa	Dungannon
Dam Bacchante 1809	Williamson's Ditto; 1800	Arethusa	Prophet mare (1777)
Dam Bacchante 1809	Mercury mare 1791	Mercury	Eclipse*
Dam Bacchante 1809	Mercury mare 1791	Mercury	Tartar mare (1757)
Dam Bacchante 1809	Mercury mare 1791	Herod mare (1776)	Herod*^
Dam Bacchante 1809	Mercury mare 1791	Herod mare (1776)	Folly (Family: 8-b)

*^ Sultan is inbred 4S x 5S x 5D x 4D to the stallion Herod, meaning that he appears fourth generation and fifth generation (via Highflyer)^ on the sire side of his pedigree and fifth generation (via Highflyer)^ and fourth generation on the dam side of his pedigree.

* Sultan is inbred 4S x 4D to the stallion Eclipse, meaning that he appears fourth generation on the sire side of his pedigree and fourth generation on the dam side of his pedigree.

* Sultan is inbred 4S x 4D to the stallion Highflyer, meaning that he appears fourth generation on the sire side of his pedigree and fourth generation on the dam side of his pedigree.
