= King Tom =

Politician

King Tom was the Temne ruler of the land where the Province of Freedom, Sierra Leone was first located.

He was described by John C. Lettsome as "a very fine fellow, so far as dress goes, for he generally has variegated bright colours; his hat is immensely large, and the whole flap covered with gold lace, of which he is very proud. His palace is, however equal to a hut."

Lettsome also stated that he was at one time father-in-law of Henry Smeathman.

== Bibliography ==
- Braidwood, Stephen (1994). Black Poor and White Philanthropists: London's Blacks and the Foundation of the Sierra Leone Settlement 1786 - 1791. Liverpool: Liverpool University Press. ISBN 978-0-85323-377-0.
