= Glencoe I =

British-bred Thoroughbred racehorse

Glencoe
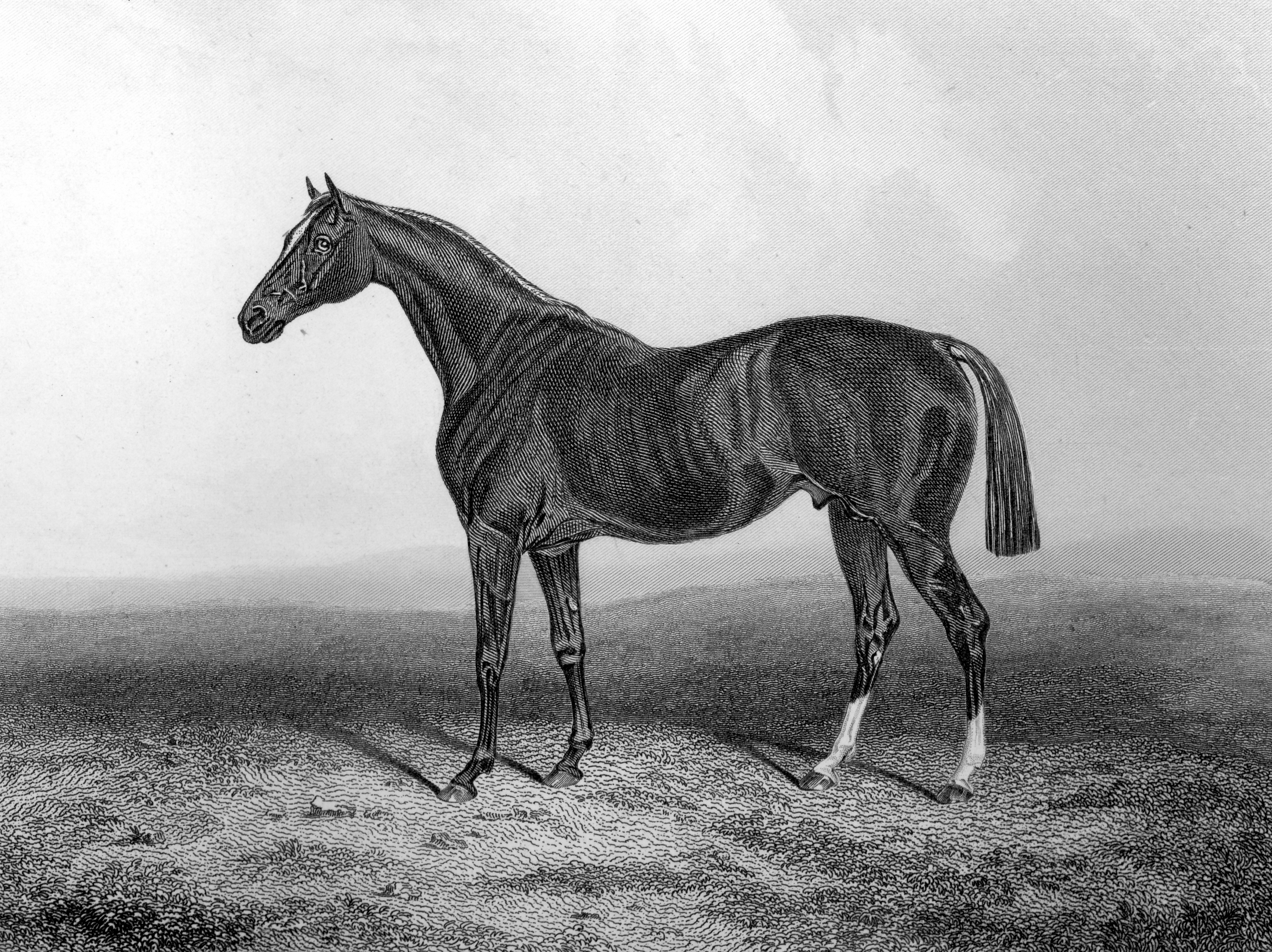
- Glencoe, from Frank Forester's Horse and Horsemanship of the United States published in 1857
- Sire: Sultan
- Grandsire: Selim
- Dam: Trampoline
- Damsire: Tramp
- Sex: Stallion
- Foaled: 1831
- Country: Great Britain
- Colour: Chestnut
- Breeder: George Child Villiers, 5th Earl of Jersey
- Owner: George Child Villiers, 5th Earl of Jersey; Mr Tattering; James Jackson; W.F. Harper; Alexander Keene Richards
- Trainer: James "Tiny" Edwards
- Record: 10: 8-1-1
- Earnings: Not found

Major wins
- Riddlesworth Stakes (1834); Dessert Stakes (1834); Royal Stakes (1834); Goodwood Cup (1834); Racing Stakes (1834); Garden Stakes (1834); Ascot Gold Cup (1835) British Classic Race wins: 2,000 Guineas (1834)

Awards
- Leading sire in North America (1847, 1849, 1850, 1854, 1855, 1856, 1857, 1858)
- Last updated on 22 November 2010

Glencoe (1831–1857) was a British bred Thoroughbred racehorse, who won the 2,000 Guineas Stakes and the Ascot Gold Cup. He was one of the earliest Thoroughbred stallions imported into the United States and was a top broodmare sire there. Several outstanding sons of Lexington were out of Glencoe mares, including Asteroid, Kentucky and Norfolk.

== Background ==
He was a chestnut stallion who was foaled at his breeder's stud, located in Middleton Stoney, Oxfordshire. Glencoe was by Sultan, a versatile stallion who won races from six furlongs to over three miles. Sultan raced until age eight and was leading sire in Great Britain for six consecutive years (1832–1837). The dam of Glencoe Trampoline (by Tramp), was a fairly good racemare and an even better producer of racehorses, foaling not only Glencoe but Glenara and Glencaire (all by Sultan).

Glencoe stood 15 hands 1¾ inches (1.57 m) high, with a large star and half-stockinged hind legs. He had a long, hollow back that sagged as he aged, but still had sound legs, deep girth, and powerful hindquarters with wide hips inherited from his sire.

== Racing record ==
Glencoe was started as a three-year-old by trainer James Edwards. Edwards is still the only trainer to have won four successive 2,000 Guineas, all four horses sired by Sultan and bred by the Earl of Jersey. Glencoe, the trainer's favourite horse, was the first of these four winners.

Glencoe first ran at the 1834 Second Riddlesworth Stakes, winning a £1,400 purse and finishing in a canter. Two days later at the same Newmarket meeting, however, he ran against the highly regarded Plenipotentiary in a £100 Sweepstakes and was beaten. He then won the Desert Stakes in a canter before winning the 2,000 Guineas Stakes, for a purse of 1,750 sovereigns. Glencoe's second loss in a stakes race was the Derby Stakes, to Plenipotentiary and Shillelah. He then had a walk-over in the Royal Stakes and won the rest of his races that season: the Goodwood Cup, by four lengths at the canter and beating Colwick; the Racing Stakes against three others; and the Garden Stakes by four lengths and defeating Colwick. After his three-year-old season, the London Sporting Magazine wrote: "...from his late performances he has shown himself the best horse in the world. Where is there one to be found to meet him at weight for age? Not in England, assuredly."

As a four-year-old, Glencoe won his only race of the season, the 2½ mile Ascot Gold Cup. He was entered in The Whip, a four-mile challenge race, during his second season, but there were no responses to the challenge. Glencoe was then retired, with this record:

- 1834: 9 starts, with 7 wins, 1 place, and 1 third
- 1835: 1 start with 1 win

== Stud record ==
Glencoe stayed in Britain for a short time after his retirement, standing at Tattersall's Dawley Wall Farm in Middlesex for his first stud season. He covered three Jersey and forty outside mares for a fee of $80, producing 30 foals. One of these mares, Marpessa, had raced against Glencoe earlier in his career. She produced his daughter, the great filly Pocahontas. Pocahontas is said to be the greatest broodmare in the history of racing, producing three outstanding sons—Stockwell, Rataplan, and King Tom. During his first year, Glencoe also sired Darkness, an Ascot Stakes winner, who is the third dam of the French sire, Plutus.

Bought by American James Jackson, Glencoe was then shipped to the United States at the end of the 1836 breeding season, arriving in New York before being sent south. James Jackson was an Irish-American emigrant who had built up a business in Nashville and started the farm Forks of Cypress in northern Alabama. Glencoe was one of the first Thoroughbreds to be imported into the United States, and had an incredible effect on the Thoroughbred bloodlines of the country, siring a calculated 481 foals during his twenty-two years at standing at stud in Alabama, Tennessee and Kentucky. It is not known what happened to the last of his foals, which were born during the first years of the American Civil War, and it is thought that the births of many foals were not recorded. Many of these fine horses were drafted into the war effort, on both sides.

Glencoe was bred in 1836 to two mares. He continued to stand in Alabama for seven years, with a stud fee of $100, siring 132 offspring. After Jackson's death in 1840, Glencoe was sent to stand in Nashville, Tennessee, for a fee of $50. He was sold in 1848, at the age of seventeen, to W.F. Harper of Midway, Kentucky, for the price of $3,000. Harper sent the horse to his Nantura Stud in 1855, and raised the stallion's stud fee to $100, where the chestnut produced 21 live foals from his 1855 covers, and 15 from his 1856 covers.

Glencoe was sold again in 1857, at the age of twenty six, to Alexander Keene Richards, owner of Blue Grass Park in Georgetown, Kentucky. Glencoe died in August, "...from a very violent attack of lung fever." The British press reported: "With all his ancient pluck, he stood up bravely against spasmodic colic and lung-fever, for ten days, and died quite exhausted, from bleeding at the nose." He was buried on Richard's Farm.

During his time in the United States, Glencoe was leading sire eight times in the 1840s and 1850s. Most of his offspring raced in three and four mile races. He sired more than twice the number of fillies to colts while he stood in America, producing at least 317 fillies, and his female offspring were superior to his male in both racing and breeding. Glencoe is therefore most known as a broodmare sire, producing not only the great Pocahontas, but Reel, one of the most influential broodmares in American racing history.

=== Progeny of Glencoe ===
Currier & Ives lithograph of 1845 contest at Long Island between Fashion and Peytona, a daughter of Glencoe

- Charmer: 1844 filly, was very successful as a four-year-old, and ran until the age of ten, winning twenty seven races in forty starts. She was not defeated in any race over three-miles (in which she started in 16). She produced five foals, and is found in the pedigrees of Emperor of Norfolk, El Rio Rey, and Yo Tambien.
- Florine: 1854 brown filly. She produced the racemares, Idlewild and Aerolite (both by Lexington). Idlewild won fifteen races before she was retired to be a broodmare. Aerolite was dam of several great racehorses.
- Magnolia: 1841 filly, dam to Daniel Boone and Kentucky (both by Lexington), as well as the filly Skedaddle (dam to Saucebox, Slyboots, and others).
- Novice: won races as a three-year-old. She was dam to Norfolk (by Lexington), who won several races and became an outstanding sire, and was grandsire of Rey del Caredas (aka Americus), who entered the General Stud Book in England.
- Peytona: she won $35,000 in the Peyton Stakes, as a four-year-old, and won a match race against Fashion (a great racemare of the North and the only horse, male or female, to beat Boston on merit). She retired with winnings of $62,400, an American record she held for fifteen years. However, she did not succeed as a broodmare, partially because Keene Richards bred her to his pure Arabian stallions. Only her daughter, Transylvania, produced a notable racehorse: Limestone (by War Dance), winner of nineteen races in 1874.
- Pocahontas a prolific broodmare.
- Pryor: Pryor, or "Prior", was foaled in 1852. He was the best of Glencoe's sons, winning several races in the United States, before he was shipped to England. There he had an unsuccessful career, and did not sire any notable offspring.
- Reel: She was the greatest of Glencoe's daughters, undefeated at a mile, two miles, and four miles, before she was injured at the age of five in her last race. She produced ten excellent racehorses, including Lecomte by Boston (beat Lexington), Prioress (set course records in America, and won in England), Starke (won several races in England), War Dance (a fantastic sire), and many daughters. She is the ninth dam of Two Lea and is considered to be the greatest broodmare of the 19th century in America.
- Topaz: 1844 filly, produced the racehorses Waterloo, Austerlitz, Lodi, and Wagram.
- Vandal: 1850 dark bay colt, won three-miler races, and inherited Glencoe's sway-back. He sired several nice daughters, including Ella D (dam of Bourbon Belle, who was the dam of Hanover), Mollie Jackson, a good race and broodmare, and the filly Vandalite (champion three-year-old of 1874). He was ranked second, to Lexington, on the leading sires list in 1862. His sons included Virgil, Voltigeur (sire of Princeton, the three-time winner of the Maryland Hunt Cup, and sire of filly Nora M. who produced the foundation Quarter Horse, Peter McCue), Versailles (grandsire to three-time Maryland Hunt Cup winner, Garry Owen).

== Sire line tree ==
- Glencoe
  - Thornhill
  - Winnebago
  - Glencoe (Howard)
  - Union
  - Highlander
    - Everlasting
  - Star Davis
    - Jerome Edger
    - Metaire
    - Day Star
  - Darby
  - Vandal
    - Jack the Barber
      - John Bell
      - Fearnaught
    - Revill
    - Volscian
    - Therit
    - Virgil
      - Vagrant
      - Vigil
      - Virginius
      - Hindoo
        - Hanover
        - Jim Gore
        - Buddhist
        - Dungarvan
        - Merry Monarch
        - Aryan
        - Macy
        - Benroe
        - Howland
        - Miller
        - Alard Scheck
      - Van Buren
      - Carley B
      - Vanguard
      - Isaac Murphy
      - Ben Ali
        - Arcade
      - Tremont
        - Dagonet
        - Fremont
        - Tremor
    - Pompey Payne
    - Versailles
      - Ira E Bride
        - Garry Owen
    - Survivor
    - Council Bluffs
    - Vagabond
      - Judge Morrow
    - Vicksburg
    - Voltigeur
      - Princeton
  - Frankfort
  - Little Arthur
  - Pryor
  - Bay Dick
    - Bay Wood
  - Bonnie Laddie
  - Foreigner
  - Nicholas I
  - France
    - King Bird
  - Glencoe Jr
  - Walnut
  - O'Meara
  - Trumpeter
    - Young Trumpeter
  - Glencoe (Hunter)
  - Panic

== Pedigree ==
Pedigree of Glencoe (GB), chestnut stallion, 1831
Sire Sultan Bay 1816	Selim; 1802	Buzzard	Woodpecker
Sire Sultan Bay 1816	Selim; 1802	Buzzard	Misfortune
Sire Sultan Bay 1816	Selim; 1802	Alexander mare (1790)	Alexander
Sire Sultan Bay 1816	Selim; 1802	Alexander mare (1790)	Highflyer mare (1780)
Sire Sultan Bay 1816	Bacchante; 1809	Williamson's Ditto	Sir Peter Teazle
Sire Sultan Bay 1816	Bacchante; 1809	Williamson's Ditto	Arethusa
Sire Sultan Bay 1816	Bacchante; 1809	Mercury mare (1791)	Mercury
Sire Sultan Bay 1816	Bacchante; 1809	Mercury mare (1791)	Herod mare (1776)
Dam Trampoline 1825	Tramp; 1810	Dick Andrews	Joe Andrews
Dam Trampoline 1825	Tramp; 1810	Dick Andrews	Highflyer mare (1790)
Dam Trampoline 1825	Tramp; 1810	Gohanna mare (1803)	Gohanna
Dam Trampoline 1825	Tramp; 1810	Gohanna mare (1803)	Fraxinella
Dam Trampoline 1825	Web; 1808	Waxy	Potoooooooo
Dam Trampoline 1825	Web; 1808	Waxy	Maria
Dam Trampoline 1825	Web; 1808	Penelope	Trumpator
Dam Trampoline 1825	Web; 1808	Penelope	Prunella (Family: 1-t)
