= Dangerous (horse) =

British-bred Thoroughbred racehorse

- Engraving by Charles Hunt, after John Frederick Herring Sr.
- Sire: Tramp
- Grandsire: Dick Andrews
- Dam: Defiance
- Damsire: Rubens
- Sex: Stallion
- Foaled: 1830
- Country: United Kingdom of Great Britain and Ireland
- Colour: Chestnut
- Owner: Isaac Sadler
- Trainer: Isaac Sadler
- Record: 6:3–2–1

Major wins
- Epsom Derby (1833)

Dangerous (foaled 1830) was a British Thoroughbred racehorse and sire. In a career that lasted from June 1829 to July 1830 he ran six times and won three races, although two of his wins were walkovers. By far his most important win came on his first appearance as a three-year-old when he won the Derby as a 30/1 outsider. Dangerous was retired to stud at the end of his three-year-old season and was shortly afterwards exported to France.

== Background ==
Dangerous was a "rich chestnut" horse with a small white star standing 15.3 hands high, bred by his owner, Isaac Sadler (1784–1860), a livery stable owner who bred horses at Northleach in Gloucestershire. Sadler trained the colt himself at Stockbridge in Hampshire. He had previously trained his horses at Aldworth but relocated in 1832 to take advantage of the superior gallops at the Hampshire venue. Dangerous was sired by Tramp, who won several important races in 1813 and 1814 and went on to become a very successful stallion, siring important winners including St. Giles (Epsom Derby) and Barefoot (St Leger). Dangerous was one of several good foals produced by the mare Defiance, including Delight, Defence, Design and others, all beginning with the letter "D".

== Racing career ==
=== 1832: two-year-old season ===
Dangerous made his first racecourse appearance at Ascot in June. He started at odds of 5/2 and finished second of the three runners in a Sweepstakes to a filly named Minima. At Stockbridge Racecourse later that month he started odds-on favourite for Sweepstakes but was easily beaten by Glaucus, who went on to be one of the season's leading colts. On his final start of the season he was unplaced behind Trepidation in a half-mile race at Warwick on 5 September.

=== 1833: three-year-old season ===
Dangerous was not mentioned among the Derby contenders in the early part of the year and his participation in the race was only announced a day or two before the event, making him very much a "dark horse".

At Epsom on 23 May, Dangerous was offered at odds of 25/1 and 30/1 for the Derby in a field of twenty-five runners, with Glaucus starting the 3/1 favourite. According to the Court Journal the crowds were the largest in memory, with hundreds of carriages, thousands of mounted spectators and an "innumerable phalanx" of pedestrians. The start of the race was delayed by "shameful confusion" as mounted officials struggled to clear the course of spectators and their carriages. Ridden by Jem Chapple, Dangerous was restrained at the back of the field in the early stages as Catalan, another of the outsiders set a very strong pace from Forester. Many of the runners were soon struggling, but Chapple was able to bring Dangerous through the field to join the leading group as the horses approached the turn into the straight. Two furlongs from the finish, Dangerous moved past Catalan closely followed by Connoisseur who was his only serious challenger. Dangerous appeared to be "full of running" and pulled ahead to win "with scarcely any trouble", by a length from Connoisseur, with Revenge finishing strongly to take third. Apart from the first six horses, most of the other runners were either tailed-off or pulled-up before the finish. A correspondent for the Sportsman's Cabinet took this as evidence that many of the jockeys had ridden with no intention of winning. The same writer, however, claimed that the race was run at a slow pace, whereas most other sources report that the opposite was true, with the American Turf Register and Sporting Magazine describing the race as "the fastest Derby on record". In addition to the prize money of £3,725, Sadler was reported to have won "a large sum in bets".

Later that season Dangerous claimed two more prizes without having to run in a competitive race. No other horses opposed him and he was allowed to walk over in a Sweepstakes at Stockbridge on 27 July and a similar race at Winchester. The colt had actually sustained an injury after the Derby and would have been unable to take part in a serious race, but his trainer managed to keep his condition secret, enabling to collect both races without being tested.

His injury problems made it impossible to keep Dangerous in training and he was retired at the end of the season.

== Assessment ==
Some commentators acknowledged that Dangerous was the best horse on the day at Epsom and might have gone to greater success if he had stayed sound. He was described elsewhere as "one of the worst Derby winners" and it was rumoured that many of the more fancied horses had been "made safe"– prevented from winning by either bribery, drugs or deliberate injury.

== Stud career ==
Dangerous began his stud career in England in 1834. A year later he was sold to representatives of the French government and exported to France, but made no mark as a sire. He was sold in 1846 and disappears from the French breeding records.

== Pedigree ==
Pedigree of Dangerous (GB), chestnut stallion, 1830
Sire Tramp (GB) 1810	Dick Andrews; 1797	Joe Andrews	Eclipse*
Sire Tramp (GB) 1810	Dick Andrews; 1797	Joe Andrews	Amaranda
Sire Tramp (GB) 1810	Dick Andrews; 1797	Highflyer mare (1790)	Highflyer*
Sire Tramp (GB) 1810	Dick Andrews; 1797	Highflyer mare (1790)	Cardinal Puff mare
Sire Tramp (GB) 1810	Gohanna mare 1803	Gohanna	Mercury*^
Sire Tramp (GB) 1810	Gohanna mare 1803	Gohanna	Dundas' Herod mare
Sire Tramp (GB) 1810	Gohanna mare 1803	Fraxinella	Trentham
Sire Tramp (GB) 1810	Gohanna mare 1803	Fraxinella	Woodpecker mare*^
Dam Defiance (GB) 1816	Rubens; 1805	Buzzard	Woodpecker*
Dam Defiance (GB) 1816	Rubens; 1805	Buzzard	Misfortune
Dam Defiance (GB) 1816	Rubens; 1805	Alexander mare	Alexander
Dam Defiance (GB) 1816	Rubens; 1805	Alexander mare	Highflyer mare (1780)*^
Dam Defiance (GB) 1816	Little Folly; 1806	Highland Fling	Spadille*^
Dam Defiance (GB) 1816	Little Folly; 1806	Highland Fling	Caelia
Dam Defiance (GB) 1816	Little Folly; 1806	Harriet	Volunteer
Dam Defiance (GB) 1816	Little Folly; 1806	Harriet	Alfred mare (Family:5)

* Dangerous is inbred 4S x 5D x 5D to the stallion Highflyer, meaning that he appears fourth generation once on the sire side of his pedigree and fifth generation twice (via Highflyer mare (1780) and Spadille)^ on the dam side of his pedigree.

* Dangerous is inbred 4S x 5S to the stallion Eclipse, meaning that he appears fourth generation and fifth generation (via Mercury) on the sire side of his pedigree.

* Dangerous is inbred 5S x 4D to the stallion Woodpecker, meaning that he appears fifth generation (Via Woodpecker mare)^ on the sire side of his pedigree and fourth generation on the dam side of his pedigree.
