= Ditto (horse) =

British Thoroughbred racehorse

- Sire: Sir Peter Teazle
- Grandsire: Highflyer
- Dam: Arethusa
- Damsire: Dungannon
- Sex: Stallion
- Foaled: 1800
- Country: Kingdom of Great Britain
- Colour: Bay
- Breeder: Sir Hedworth Williamson
- Owner: Sir Hedworth Williamson; Mr. Wilson
- Trainer: J. Lonsdale
- Record: 6:4-1-0

Major wins
- Epsom Derby (1803); Claret Stakes (1804); Craven Stakes (1805)

Ditto (1800–1821) was a British Thoroughbred racehorse and sire. During a racing career that lasted from May 1803 to April 1807 he was lightly campaigned, running six times in five seasons and winning four races. In the summer of 1803 he proved himself one of the best British colts of his generation, by winning Derby on his only appearance on the season. He went on to win two important races at Newmarket and a King's Plate at Guildford. Ditto was retired to stud in 1808 and had some success as a sire of winners.

== Background ==
The name of the 1803 Derby winner appears in at least three forms. When he won the Derby his name was recorded as Ditto Ditto; when he raced in 1804 and 1805 his name had been reduced to simply Ditto; in pedigrees he was usually listed as Williamson's Ditto. The third of these forms was used to avoid confusion: apart from the fact that there were other horses with similar names, the phrase "by ditto" was very frequently used in the General Stud Book to mean "sired by the same stallion as the previous horse".

Ditto was a bay horse, described as having "great size" and a "fine temper" bred by his owner Sir Hedworth Williamson. His sire, Sir Peter Teazle (or simply "Sir Peter") won the Epsom Derby in 1787 and became the most successful stallion of the time, winning the title of Champion sire on ten occasions between 1799 and 1809. Ditto's dam Arethusa, who was bred by the Prince of Wales, was one of the most successful broodmares of her era: apart from Ditto she produced the leading stallion Walton the Derby winner Pan and the Ascot Gold Cup winner Lutzen.

== Racing career ==
=== 1803: three-year-old season ===
Ditto made his first racecourse appearance on 26 May in the Derby at Epsom. Despite his lack of previous experience he was made 7/2 second favourite in a field of six runners. Ridden by Bill Clift, he won the first prize of 1,650 guineas by beating Lord Grey's unnamed Sir Peter colt and Sir Frank Standish's unnamed Brother to Stamford, the 7/4 favourite. Ditto's owners were later to claim that he won the race "in a trot". The first three were all sired by Sir Peter Teazle.

=== 1804: four-year-old season ===
Ditto reappeared after a break of more than ten months when he ran at the Craven meeting at Newmarket in the spring of 1804. On 17 April he ran in the Claret Stakes over the two mile "Ditch In" course in which he was re-opposed by Frank Standish's still unnamed Brother to Stamford. Ditto started the 4/7 favourite and reproduced his Derby-winning form to beat the Brother to Stamford and Discussor to take the first prize of 1,200 guineas. Ditto was then off the course for a year.

=== 1805: five-year-old season ===
Ditto returned for the Craven Stakes, an all-aged race run over ten furlongs "Across the Flat" at Newmarket on 15 April 1805. He started 3/1 second favourite in a field of eleven runners and won the race from the four-year-old colts Castrel and Agincourt. Three days later he ran a match race against Lord Foley's Sir Harry Dimsdale, a grey horse who had finished unplaced in the Craven Stakes. Running over Newmarket's four mile Beacon Course, Ditto started favourite but suffered his first defeat as he failed to concede seven pounds to his opponent.

On 4 June Ditto ran in a King's Plate at Guildford Racecourse. King's Plates were races in which horses carried heavy weights and ran in a series of heats, with the first horse to take two heats being the winner. Carrying 160 pounds, Ditto beat his only rival, a five-year-old mare named Gipsy, in the first of the four mile heats and claimed the prize when the mare was withdrawn from the second heat.

=== 1807: seven-year-old season ===
After missing the whole of the 1806 season, Ditto returned in 1807 as the property of Mr Wilson. On 29 April Ditto ran in a handicap race over Newmarket's Ditch Mile course. He carried top weight of 131 pounds and started 7/4 favourite but finished unplaced behind Hippomenes Later the same afternoon, Mr Wilson claimed a 20 guinea forfeit when Ditto's scheduled opponent, Hedley, was withdrawn from a one-mile match race. Ditto did not race again and was retired to stud.

== Stud career ==
Between 1810 and 1814 Ditto was standing as a stallion at Snitterfield, near Stratford-upon-Avon in Warwickshire at a fee of 10 guineas for thoroughbreds and 5 guineas for half-bred mares. He was listed as being the property of Mr Hawkes. By 1815 he had been moved to Bildeston, near Bury St. Edmunds and was standing at a fee of 12 guineas.

Ditto's most notable offspring was Luzborough, who won twenty-five races and was exported to the United States where he became a very successful sire. Ditto was also the damsire of the six-time leading sire in Great Britain and Ireland Sultan. His last recorded foals were conceived in 1821. Ditto died in 1821, aged 21 years.

== Sire line tree ==
- Ditto
  - Luzborough
    - Picton

== Pedigree ==
Pedigree of Ditto (GB), bay stallion, 1800
Sire Sir Peter Teazle (GB) 1784	Highflyer; 1774	Herod*	Tartar
Sire Sir Peter Teazle (GB) 1784	Highflyer; 1774	Herod*	Cypron
Sire Sir Peter Teazle (GB) 1784	Highflyer; 1774	Rachel	Blank
Sire Sir Peter Teazle (GB) 1784	Highflyer; 1774	Rachel	Regulus mare*^
Sire Sir Peter Teazle (GB) 1784	Papillon; 1769	Snap*	Snip
Sire Sir Peter Teazle (GB) 1784	Papillon; 1769	Snap*	sister to Slipby
Sire Sir Peter Teazle (GB) 1784	Papillon; 1769	Miss Cleveland	Regulus*^
Sire Sir Peter Teazle (GB) 1784	Papillon; 1769	Miss Cleveland	Midge
Dam Arethusa (GB) 1792	Dungannon; 1780	Eclipse	Marske
Dam Arethusa (GB) 1792	Dungannon; 1780	Eclipse	Spilletta^
Dam Arethusa (GB) 1792	Dungannon; 1780	Aspasia	Herod*
Dam Arethusa (GB) 1792	Dungannon; 1780	Aspasia	Doris
Dam Arethusa (GB) 1792	Prophet mare 1777	Prophet	Regulus*^
Dam Arethusa (GB) 1792	Prophet mare 1777	Prophet	Jenny Spinner
Dam Arethusa (GB) 1792	Prophet mare 1777	Virago	Snap*
Dam Arethusa (GB) 1792	Prophet mare 1777	Virago	Regulus mare*^ (Family:7)

* Ditto is inbred 3S x 4D to the stallion Herod, meaning that he appears third generation on the sire side of his pedigree and fourth generation on the dam side of his pedigree.

* Ditto is inbred 3S x 4D to the stallion Snap, meaning that he appears third generation on the sire side of his pedigree and fourth generation on the dam side of his pedigree.

* Ditto is inbred 4S x 4D to the mare Regulus mare, meaning that she appears fourth generation on the sire side of his pedigree and fourth generation on the dam side of his pedigree.

^ Ditto is inbred 5S x 4S x 5D x 4D x 5D to the stallion Regulus, meaning that he appears fifth and fourth generation once each on the sire side of his pedigree as well as fourth generation once and fifth generation twice on the dam side of his pedigree.
