= Middleton (horse) =

British-bred Thoroughbred racehorse

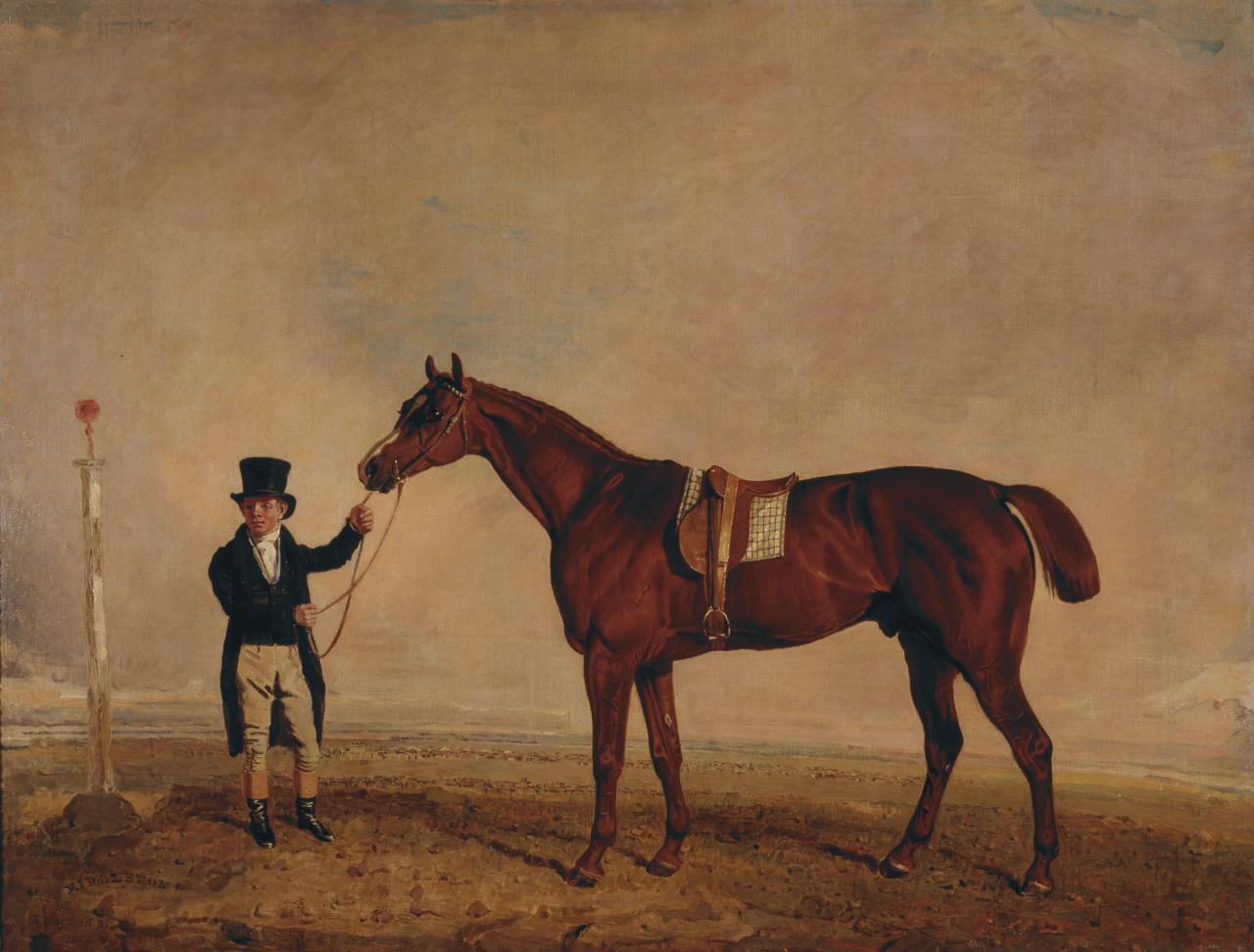
- Lord Jersey's Middleton, by Benjamin Marshall (1825)
- Sire: Phantom
- Grandsire: Walton
- Dam: Web
- Damsire: Waxy
- Sex: Stallion
- Foaled: 1822
- Country: United Kingdom of Great Britain and Ireland
- Colour: Chestnut
- Breeder: George Child Villiers, 5th Earl of Jersey
- Owner: George Child Villiers, 5th Earl of Jersey
- Trainer: James Edwards
- Record: 1: 1-0-0

Major wins
- Epsom Derby (1825)

Middleton (1822 – 1847), also known as Chestnut Middleton, was a British Thoroughbred racehorse and sire. His racing career consisted of a single race: a win in the 1825 Epsom Derby. Training problems prevented him from racing again, and he was retired undefeated to stud. He was exported to Russia in 1833.

== Background ==
Middleton was a big, heavily built chestnut horse with a white blaze bred by his owner George Child Villiers, 5th Earl of Jersey at his stud at Middleton Stoney in Oxfordshire. His sire, Phantom won the Derby in 1811 and went on to be Champion sire on two occasions. Middleton's dam, Web, was a half-sister of the Derby winner Whisker and became an extremely successful broodmare, her descendants including the Classic winners Glencoe, Cobweb (Epsom Oaks), Charlotte West (1000 Guineas) and Riddlesworth (2000 Guineas).

== Racing career ==
Middleton was slow to mature and did not run as a two-year-old. In early 1825, however, he performed well in private trial races. Despite never having raced in public, he became the leading fancy for The Derby and was the subject of much heavy betting for the race, with Lord Jersey and the Duke of Wellington among the biggest gamblers.

On the morning of the race, Middleton was the target of a plan by bookmakers to prevent him winning the race. A stable lad was bribed to allow the colt to drink several buckets of water, leaving him bloated. Edwards responded by giving Middleton a four-mile exercise walk after which he professed himself satisfied with the colt's condition. Middleton started at odds of 7/4 against seventeen opponents and won cleverly, from Rufus, with Hogarth third. Both Jersey and Wellington reportedly claimed over £1,000 in winning bets.

In autumn, Middleton was entered in several match races but did not run after either he or his opponent was withdrawn. Middleton began to suffer from Navicular Disease which caused chronic lameness. It proved impossible to run him again, and he was retired to stud with an unbeaten record.

== Stud career ==
Middleton stood as a stallion at the Horse Bazaar, Portman Square, London, where he had little success. In 1833, he was sold and exported to Russia. Middleton died in 1847.

== Pedigree ==
Pedigree of Middleton (GB), chestnut stallion, 1822
Sire Phantom (GB) 1808	Walton; 1799	Sir Peter Teazle	Highflyer*^
Sire Phantom (GB) 1808	Walton; 1799	Sir Peter Teazle	Papillon
Sire Phantom (GB) 1808	Walton; 1799	Arethusa	Dungannon
Sire Phantom (GB) 1808	Walton; 1799	Arethusa	Prophet mare
Sire Phantom (GB) 1808	Julia; 1799	Whiskey	Saltram^
Sire Phantom (GB) 1808	Julia; 1799	Whiskey	Calash
Sire Phantom (GB) 1808	Julia; 1799	Young Giantess	Diomed^
Sire Phantom (GB) 1808	Julia; 1799	Young Giantess	Giantess
Dam Web (GB) 1808	Waxy; 1790	Potoooooooo	Eclipse^
Dam Web (GB) 1808	Waxy; 1790	Potoooooooo	Sportsmistress
Dam Web (GB) 1808	Waxy; 1790	Maria	Herod^
Dam Web (GB) 1808	Waxy; 1790	Maria	Lisette
Dam Web (GB) 1808	Penelope; 1798	Trumpator	Conductor
Dam Web (GB) 1808	Penelope; 1798	Trumpator	Brunette
Dam Web (GB) 1808	Penelope; 1798	Prunella	Highflyer*^
Dam Web (GB) 1808	Penelope; 1798	Prunella	Promise (Family: 1-o)

* Middleton is inbred 4S x 4D to the stallion Highflyer, meaning that he appears fourth generation on the sire side of his pedigree and fourth generation on the dam side of his pedigree.

^ Middleton is inbred 5S x 6S x 4D x 5D to the stallion Herod, meaning that he appears fifth (via Highflyer) and sixth generation (via Diomed) on the sire side of his pedigree and fourth and fifth generation (via Highflyer) on the dam side of his pedigree.

^ Middleton is inbred 5S x 4D to the stallion Eclipse, meaning that he appears fifth generation (via Saltram) on the sire side of his pedigree and fourth generation on the dam side of his pedigree.
