= List of significant families in British horse racing =

In British horse racing, it is very common for many members of the same family to be participants in the sport, often through many generations. Children often take over racing stables from their parents, and often ride for their parents when first starting out. For periods, certain families have become highly prominent and it can sometimes be difficult in the historical record to distinguish particular individuals when names are shared. This is a list of male line families (i.e. those families that share a surname) of which at least three members have gained some notability in horse racing in Great Britain.

== Arnull ==
- Sam Arnull, jockey; younger brother of
- John Arnull, jockey; father of
  - Bill Arnull, jockey

== Balding ==
- Gerald Barnard Balding, Sr., father of
  - Toby Balding
  - Ian Balding, father of
    - Clare Balding
    - Andrew Balding

== Cannon ==
- Tom Cannon, Sr., father of
  - Kempton Cannon
  - Mornington Cannon
  - Tom Cannon, Jr.
  - Charles Cannon

== Carson ==
- Willie Carson, and descendants

== Chifney ==
- Samuel Chifney, Sr. (1753-1807), jockey; father of
  - William Chifney, trainer,
  - Samuel Chifney, Jr. (b. 1786), jockey

== Childs ==
- John Childs, jockey; father of
  - Albert Childs, jockey
  - Arthur Childs, jockey
  - Charlie Childs, jockey
  - Henry Childs, jockey
  - Joe Childs, jockey

== Day ==
- John Day, trainer, father of
  - John Barham Day (1793-1860), jockey and trainer, father of
    - Sam Day, Jr. (1818-1838), jockey
    - John Day, Jr. (1819-1883), jockey and trainer, grandfather of Mornington, Kempton, Tom Jr. and Charles Cannon; great-grandfather of Keith Piggott
    - William Day (1823-1908), trainer, father of
      - Alfred Day, founder of Fontwell Racecourse
    - Alfred Day (1830-1868), jockey
  - Sam Day (1801-1866), jockey

== Goodisson ==
- Dick Goodisson (c. 1750-1817), Oaks-winning jockey; father of
  - Tom Goodisson (1782-1840), multiple Classic-winning jockey
  - Charles Goodisson (c. 1786-1813), jockey

== Greaves ==
- David Greaves, jockey
- Valerie Greaves (1945-2015), jockey, mother of
  - Alex Greaves (b.1968), jockey, trainer

== Hannon ==
- Harry Hannon, trainer; father of
  - Richard Hannon Sr. (born 1945), four times British flat racing Champion Trainer; father of
    - Richard Hannon Jr. (born 1975), trainer

== Hastings ==
- Aubrey Hastings, trainer; father of
  - Peter Hastings-Bass (1920-1964), trainer; grandfather of Andrew Balding and Clare Balding; father of
    - William Hastings-Bass, 17th Earl of Huntingdon (born 1948), trainer

== Hills ==
- Barry Hills, trainer; father of
  - Michael Hills, jockey
  - Richard Hills, jockey
  - Charlie Hills, trainer
  - John Hills, trainer

== Moore ==
- George Moore, trainer; father of
  - Gary Moore, trainer; father of
    - Ryan Moore, jockey
    - Jamie Moore, jockey
    - Joshua Moore, jockey

== Piggott ==
- Ernest Piggott, father of
  - Keith Piggott, father of
    - Lester Piggott

== Scudamore ==
- Michael Scudamore, father of
  - Peter Scudamore, eight time British jump racing Champion Jockey; partner of Lucinda Russell, and father of
    - Michael Scudamore, Jr., trainer
    - Tom Scudamore, jockey

== Singleton ==
- John Singleton the Elder, (1715-c.1795), first rider to Lord Rockingham between 1760 and 1780; uncle of

- John Singleton the Younger, also rider to Lord Rockingham and winner of the first running of the St. Leger Stakes in 1776; father of

- John Singleton, Jr., who rode the winner of the 1797 Derby

== Templeman ==
- Sim Templeman (1805-1884), winner of seven Classics; uncle of

- William Templeman (1858-1914), jockey, father of

- Clark Templeman (1885-1953), jockey
- Arthur Templeman (1886-1938), jockey, winner of the 1905 Cambridgeshire Handicap
- Fred Templeman (1892-1973), jockey, winner of the 1919 Derby

== Tinkler ==
- Colin Tinkler Sr (1927-2016), trainer, father of
  - Colin Tinkler Jr (b 1954), jockey and trainer, father of
    - Andrew Tinkler (b 1985), jockey
    - Nicky Tinkler, amateur jockey
  - Nigel Tinkler (b 1958), jockey and trainer

== Wragg ==
- Harry Wragg (1902-1985), Classic winner as jockey and trainer, brother of
- Sam Wragg (1909-1983), Classic winning jockey, brother of
- Arthur Wragg (1912-1954)
