= John Singleton (disambiguation) =

John Singleton (1968–2019) was an American film director, screenwriter, and producer.

John Singleton may also refer to:

== Jockeys ==
- John Singleton (jockey, born 1715), first rider to Lord Rockingham between 1760 and 1780
- John Singleton (jockey, died c. 1789), his nephew, also rider to Lord Rockingham and winner of the first running of the St. Leger Stakes in 1776
- John Singleton (jockey, born 1776), his son, who rode the winner of the 1797 Derby

== Judges ==
- John Singleton (British judge) (1885–1957), British Lord Justice of Appeal and Member of Parliament for Lancaster, 1922–1923
- John Virgil Singleton Jr. (1918–2015), U.S. federal judge

== Other people ==
- John Singleton (athlete) (1896–1937), American professional baseball and football player
- John Singleton (Australian entrepreneur) (born 1941)
- John Singleton (philanthropist) (1808–1891), Australian philanthropist, co-founder of Melbourne City Mission
- John Andrew Singleton (1895–1970), civil rights activist, dentist, and member of the Nebraska House of Representatives
- John B. Singleton, former city council member and police commissioner in Myrtle Beach, South Carolina, United States, for whom John B. Singleton Parkway is named

== See also ==
- Jon Singleton (accountant), public servant in Manitoba, Canada
- Jon Singleton (baseball) (born 1991), American baseball player
- Jonathan Singleton, country music songwriter, or his band, Jonathan Singleton & the Grove
