= Matt Stephenson (racehorse trainer) =

British jockey and horse trainer (1735–1808)

Personal information
- Born: 1735
- Died: 1808 (aged 72–73) Newmarket, Suffolk
- Occupations: Jockey and Racehorse Trainer

Horse racing career
- Sport: Horse racing

Major racing wins
- British Classic Races; As jockey Epsom Derby (1791); As trainer Epsom Derby (1789, 1791, 1797); Epsom Oaks (1790, 1791, 1793)

Significant horses
- Colt by Fidget, Eager, Skyscraper

Matthew Stephenson (1735–1808) was a British Classic winning jockey and trainer of the late 18th century.

He trained the 1789 Derby winner, Skyscraper, ridden to victory by Sam Chifney. However, he would surpass that in 1791 when, at the age of 56, he completed the near unique feat of both training and riding the Derby winner, Eager. Owned by the Duke of Bedford, Eager started at odds of 5/2 and beat the 5/4 favourite, Vermin, into second. He trained a third Derby winner in 1797 – an unnamed colt by Fidget, which was ridden by John Singleton.

He also trained a hat-trick of Oaks winners in the 1790s: Hippolyta (1790), Portia (1791) and Caelia (1793). All were Duke of Bedford horses.

Matt married John Singleton's sister, Elizabeth, and both his son and grandson became trainers. He died at Newmarket, Suffolk in 1808. His great-great-granddaughter is British biochemist, Marjory Stephenson.

== Major wins (as jockey) ==
(United Kingdom) Great Britain

- Epsom Derby – Eager (1791)

== Major wins (as trainer) ==
(United Kingdom) Great Britain

- Epsom Derby – Skyscraper (1789), Eager (1791), Colt by Fidget (1797)
- Epsom Oaks – Hippolyta (1790), Portia (1791), Caelia (1793)
