= Kempton Cannon =

British jockey

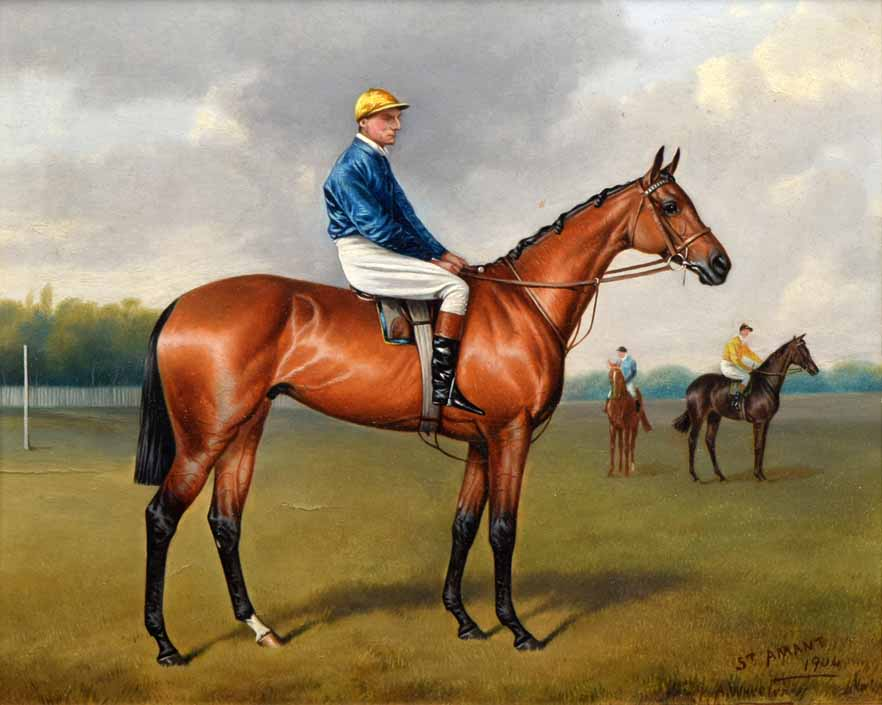
- Kempton Cannon, riding St. Amant

Personal information
- Born: 1879
- Died: 2 December 1951 (aged 71–72) Camden, London
- Occupation: Jockey
- Relatives: Tom Cannon Sr. (father); Charles Cannon (brother); Mornington Cannon (brother); Ernest Piggott (brother-in-law); Lester Piggott (great nephew)

Horse racing career
- Sport: Horse racing

Major racing wins
- British Classic Race wins as jockey: Epsom Derby (1904); St. Leger (1901)

Significant horses
- St. Amant

Walter Kempton Cannon (1879–2 December 1951), usually known as Kempton, was a Classic-winning British jockey. He was the third son of the three-times Champion Jockey, Tom Cannon, Sr., while his brothers were another champion, Morny Cannon, Tom Cannon, Jr. and Charles Cannon. He was named after Kempton Park Racecourse.

Cannon rode his first winner at fourteen and went on to win the 1901 St. Leger on Doricles and the 1904 Derby on St. Amant by three lengths for Leopold de Rothschild.

Cannon quit horseracing shortly before World War I (during which he served in the Royal Flying Corps) and ran a garage in Newmarket. He ultimately retired to Hove on the south coast. He was married to the widow of another jockey, Jack Watts.

Cannon died on 2 December 1951, aged 72.

== Bibliography ==
- Wright, Howard (1986). The Encyclopaedia of Flat Racing. London: Robert Hale. ISBN 0-7090-2639-0.

== See also ==
- List of significant families in British horse racing
