= Skyscraper (horse) =

British Thoroughbred racehorse

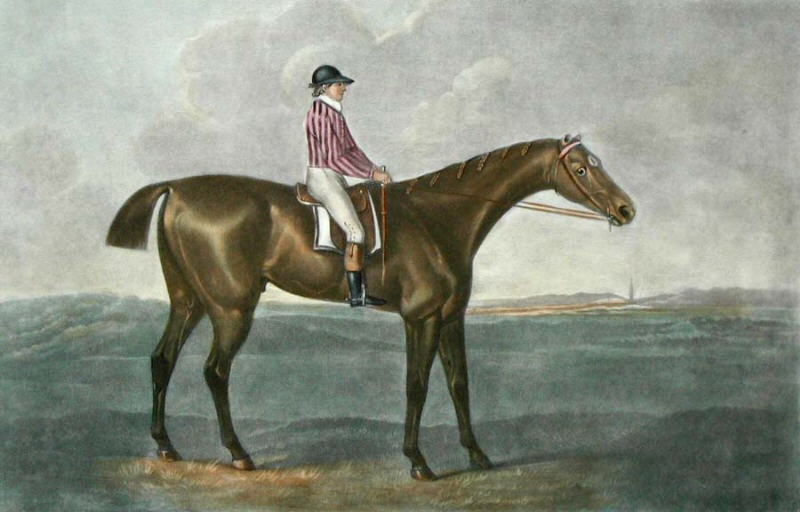
- Skyscraper as painted by George Stubbs, c. 1790
- Sire: Highflyer
- Grandsire: Herod
- Dam: Everlasting
- Damsire: Eclipse
- Sex: Stallion
- Foaled: 1786
- Country: Kingdom of Great Britain
- Colour: Bay
- Breeder: Francis Russell, 5th Duke of Bedford
- Owner: Francis Russell, 5th Duke of Bedford
- Trainer: Matthew Stephenson
- Record: 24: 14–7–1

Major wins
- Epsom Derby (1789)

Skyscraper (1786–1807) was a British Thoroughbred racehorse. One of many notable offspring of the great Highflyer, Skyscraper is best known for winning The Derby of 1789. He competed until he was seven, when after losing two races he was retired to stud.

== Background ==
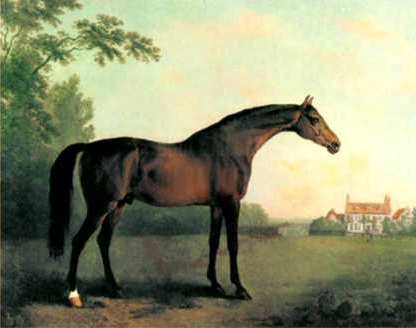
Skyscraper's sire, Highflyer

Skyscraper was bred at Woburn Abbey by Francis Russell, 5th Duke of Bedford, who was only 21 years old when the horse was foaled. Bedford went on to become a notable breeder, producing two other winners of the Derby, Eager (1788), and the nameless Colt by Fidget (1794), as well as two Oaks winners, Portia (1788) and Caelia (1790). The Duke's turf career was ended by his death in 1802.

Skyscraper's sire was Highflyer (1774), an undefeated racehorse who became the greatest stallion of his time. His grandsire was the noble Herod, the foundation sire through whom Skyscraper was in the direct male line of the Byerley Turk, while his granddam was Rachel, whose grandsire was the Godolphin Arabian.

Skyscraper's dam was Everlasting, a mare by the unbeaten Eclipse. He was a half brother to the mare Sister to Goldfinch (1785), the third dam of Hannibal, who won the Derby in 1804.

== Name ==
Skyscraper was given his name, which is thought to refer to his height, by the Duke of Bedford's racing friend Ralph Dutton. The name also echoes that of his sire, Highflyer.

The word 'skyscraper' was first applied to a building when it was used to describe the Home Insurance Building, Chicago, completed in 1884. However, the word had an earlier nautical meaning, referring to an upper sail of a tall ship.

== Racing career ==
=== 1789: three-year-old season ===
At the Newmarket Craven meeting of 1789, Skyscraper collected 240 guineas in forfeits and also won a five hundred guineas race for colts and fillies, beating Maid of all Work. At the Newmarket Second Spring meeting he won the Prince's Stakes (one hundred guineas each), beating Earl Grosvenor's Brother to Skylark, Lord Clermont's Pipator, and six others.

At Epsom on 28 May he won the Derby, beating a field of ten which included Sir George, Brother to Skylark, and the Prince of Wales's Soujah ul Dowlah. He was ridden to victory by Sam Chifney the elder. While at Epsom he also collected seventy guineas from the Earl of Egremont's three-year-old filly Tag, on whom Sam Chifney won that year's Oaks.

At Newmarket on 1 October the horse collected a 250 guineas forfeit (for a 500 guineas match) from Magpie as well as sixty guineas from Lord Egremont's Calomel. The next day he won eight hundred guineas, beating Skylark, Competitor, and nine others. Also at Newmarket he gained another £50, beating eight including Egbert, and collected 110 guineas from Sister to Lethe and 130 guineas from Braggadocio.

=== 1790: four-year-old season ===
At the Newmarket first Spring meeting Skyscraper won the Jockey Stakes (100 guineas each), beating Skylark, Pipator, and Pickle. At the Newmarket second Spring meeting he took on Sir Charles Bunbury's Glaucus in a match for one thousand guineas and was beaten. On 1 October he won the Subscription (140 guineas) at Newmarket, beating Escape (1785), but in a match for seventy guineas at the same meeting he was defeated by Skylark. The next day in a sixty guineas purse he finished fourth, the winner being Seagull.

=== 1791: five-year-old season ===
Skyscraper again had his first outing at the Newmarket first Spring meeting, with mixed success. He won the 1500 guineas, beating fifteen other horses, but in a Sweepstakes was third and last, being beaten by Spear (1786) and Shovel (1785). At the second Spring meeting he collected a forfeit of 150 guineas (for a 300 guineas each sweepstakes) from four other horses, including the Prince of Wales's Highflyer colt and a Pot-8-os colt. However, in a field of six for a Sweepstakes of fifty guineas each at the same meeting, he was runner-up to the Earl of Clermont's Tally-Ho.

=== 1792: six-year-old season ===
Skyscraper began the 1792 flat season with disappointments, but finished it strongly. In a handicap of fifty guineas each at the Newmarket Craven meeting, he finished second to his younger half-sister Thalia. At the first Spring meeting he took on Mr Bullock's Buzzard (1787) in a match for 200 guineas and was beaten, but at the meeting he went on to win the King's Plate, beating Coriander, Gustavus (1785) and Toby, the last another of his half-brothers by Highflyer. At Stockbridge he won the Prince of Wales's Plate, again meeting Thalia and beating her in both heats. At Winchester he won the King's Plate, twice beating Cropper. At Lewes he was runner-up for the King's Plate to the Earl of Egremont's Precipitate (1787), and at Derby he walked over in a race for fifty guineas. At Newmarket on 1 October he won yet another King's Plate, beating Skylark, and the next day won a race for sixty guineas, beating Skylark again.

=== 1793: seven-year-old season ===
The horse won no races in 1793. At the Newmarket first Spring meeting he was runner-up for the King's Plate to Coriander, one of the horses he had beaten in the same race the year before. At the second Spring meeting he finished fifth and last in the Jockey Club Plate. He was then retired to stud.

== Sire ==
After his last race Skyscraper was retired to Woburn, where he stood as a stallion priced at five guineas a nomination. After the death of his owner in 1802, he was transferred to a stud at Tytherton, near Chippenham, where his fee was increased to ten guineas.

His offspring included:

Foaled	Name	Sex	Major Wins/Achievements
1797	Skyrocket	Stallion	July Stakes. Damsire of Bobadil (important sire in Ireland)
1802	Cobbea	Mare	Dam of Sorcery (Epsom Oaks, dam of Cadland)

== Likenesses ==
After he won the Derby, Skyscraper's portrait was painted by J. N. Sartorius, and this was later engraved in mezzotint by Houston.

== Pedigree ==
Pedigree of Skyscraper
Sire Highflyer b. 1774	Herod b. 1758	Tartar ch. 1743	Partner
Sire Highflyer b. 1774	Herod b. 1758	Tartar ch. 1743	Meliora
Sire Highflyer b. 1774	Herod b. 1758	Cypron br. 1750	Blaze
Sire Highflyer b. 1774	Herod b. 1758	Cypron br. 1750	Salome
Sire Highflyer b. 1774	Rachel b. 1763	Blank; 1740	Godolphin Arabian^
Sire Highflyer b. 1774	Rachel b. 1763	Blank; 1740	Little Hartley mare
Sire Highflyer b. 1774	Rachel b. 1763	Regulus mare 1751	Regulus*^
Sire Highflyer b. 1774	Rachel b. 1763	Regulus mare 1751	Mare by Soreheels
Dam Everlasting	Eclipse b. 1764	Marske br. 1750	Squirt
Dam Everlasting	Eclipse b. 1764	Marske br. 1750	Ruby mare
Dam Everlasting	Eclipse b. 1764	Spilletta b. 1749	Regulus*^
Dam Everlasting	Eclipse b. 1764	Spilletta b. 1749	Mother Western
Dam Everlasting	Hyaena	Snap; 1750	Snip
Dam Everlasting	Hyaena	Snap; 1750	Sister to Slipby
Dam Everlasting	Hyaena	Miss Belsea	Regulus*^
Dam Everlasting	Hyaena	Miss Belsea	Bartlett's Childers mare

* Skyscraper is inbred 4S x 4D x 4D to the stallion Regulus, meaning that he appears fourth generation once on the sire side of his pedigree and fourth generation twice on the dam side of his pedigree.

^ Skyscraper is inbred 4S x 5S x 5D x 5D to the stallion Godolphin Arabian, meaning that he appears fourth generation once and fifth generation once on the sire side of his pedigree, and fifth generation twice on the dam side of his pedigree.
