= Charlie Childs =

English jockey

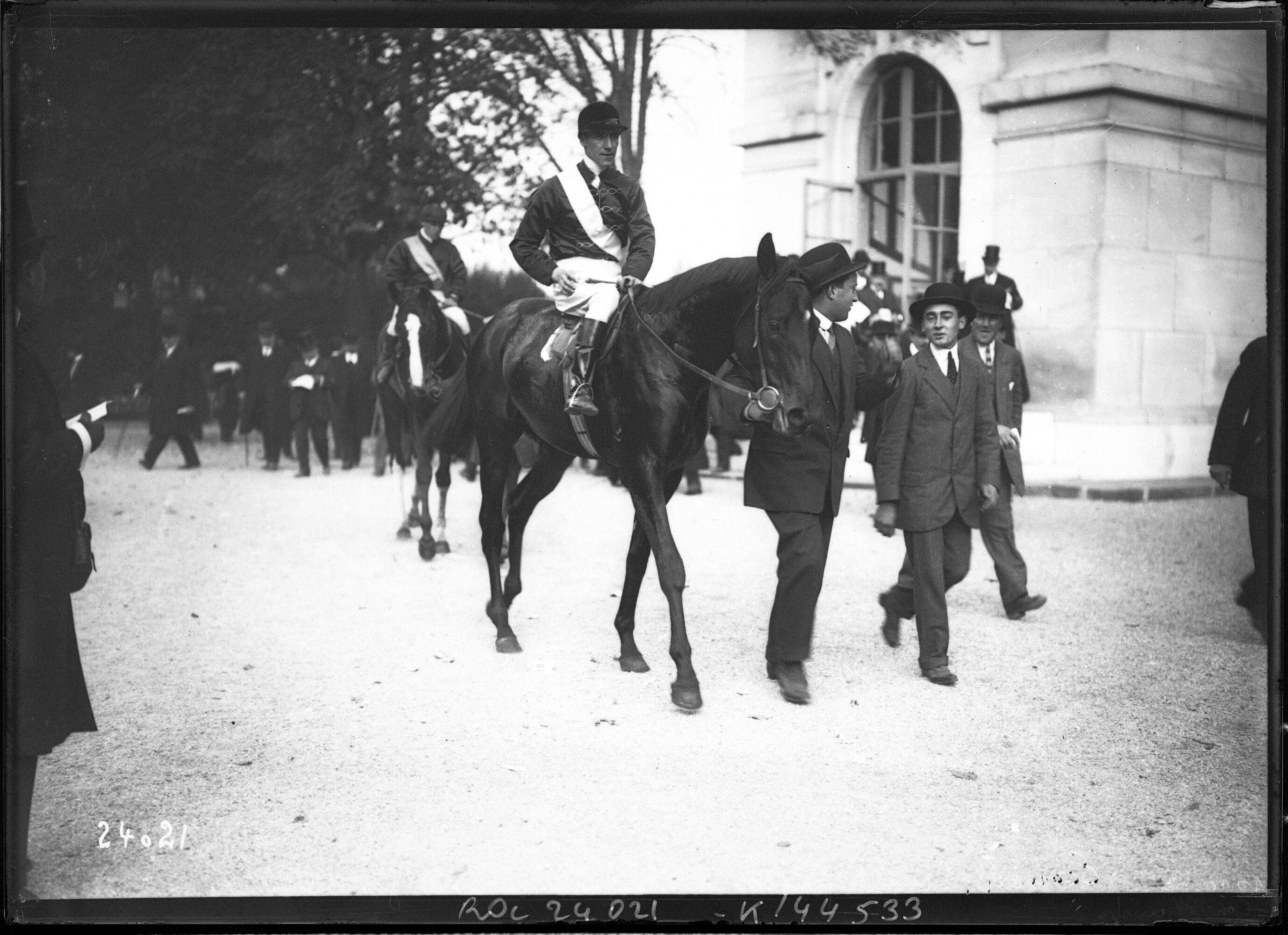
- 1912 Grand Critérium

Personal information
- Born: France
- Died: 4 October 1957 Newmarket, Suffolk, England
- Occupation: Jockey

Horse racing career
- Sport: Horse racing

Major racing wins
- British Classic Races: St Leger Stakes (1916)

Significant horses
- Hurry On
- Updated on 22 October 2023

Charlie Childs was the winning jockey of the 1916 St Leger.

He was born in France to John Childs and was one of five jockey brothers. He became apprentice to Tom Jennings, Jr. in Newmarket along with brother Joe.

His major racing success was winning the 1916 St Leger on 11/10 favourite Hurry On, considered by trainer Fred Darling to be the best he ever trained. He won by three lengths from Clarissimus, ridden by Frank Bullock, with his brother Joe a further five lengths back in third on Atheling.

Childs died at Newmarket on October 4, 1957, aged 72.

== Major wins ==
(United Kingdom) Great Britain

- St Leger Stakes - Hurry On (1916)

France

- Grand Prix de Paris - Nuage (1910)

== See also ==
- List of jockeys
- List of significant families in British horse racing

== Bibliography ==
- Fairfax-Blakeborough, John (1950). Northern Turf History Vol. III: York and Doncaster Races. London: J. A. Allen & Co.
- Wright, Howard (1986). The Encyclopaedia of Flat Racing. London: Robert Hale. ISBN 0-7090-2639-0.
