= Charles Cannon =

Charles Cannon may refer to:

- Charles Cannon (Manitoba politician) (1866–1952), Canadian politician in the Manitoba government
- Charles Albert Cannon (1892–1971), American industrialist
- Charles Cannon (Quebec politician) (1905–1976), Canadian Member of Parliament for Îles-de-la-Madeleine
- Charlie Cannon (1911–2003), Mexican-born American entertainer
- Charles Craig Cannon (1914–1992), American military captain
- Chuck Cannon, American country music songwriter
- Charles Cannon (jockey), member of a significant family in British horse racing
- Charles Cannon (Georgia politician), American politician
