= Valerie Greaves =

British jockey (1945–2015)

Personal information
- Born: 18 November 1944 Cottingham, England
- Died: 5 September 2015 (aged 70) Northallerton
- Occupations: Jockey, trainer
- Children: 2

Horse racing career
- Sport: Horse racing

Valerie Greaves (1945–2015), known as Val, was an English horsewoman. In May 1976 she became the first amateur woman to "beat professionals under Rules" at Hexham Racecourse. She was also the first woman to beat professional jockeys over jumps. Her daughter, Alex Greaves became a professional jockey and was the first woman to race in the Epsom Derby, in 1996.

== Personal life ==
Valerie was born in Cottingham, England. She married farmer Ernest Greaves, who was a British Show Pony Society judge. They had two children, including Alex, who went on to become a record-breaking flat racer. Greaves' brother-in-law was jockey David Greaves, who won the Mackeson (now Paddy Power) Gold Cup in 1975.

== Career ==
Val went to Cottingham Secondary School and left home, and school, at the age of 15 to work in Bill Bryan's yard in Herefordshire. Bill Bryan later became a leading show jump owner and trainer. "Red Dove" was one of the first horses Val rode at Bill Bryan's yard, the foundation mare of all of Mr Price's "Doves". At the age of 16, Val rode in her first point-to-point. The following year, the age for point-to-point riders changed to 18 so Val's point-to point riding career came to a brief halt.

In 1963, Val left Bill Bryan's yard and spent the summer at a trotting stud in Gotland, Sweden. On her return to the UK, Val went to work for Mrs N Staveleyt MFH, in North Stainley, Ripon. While working for Mrs Staveley, Val's first point-to-point winner came on “Gay Pelican” in 1965. During Val's time at North Stainley, Val acted as amateur Whipper-in to the West of Yore hounds

In 1973 Val married Ernie Greaves, moved to West Harsley, Northallerton, and had two children (Alex and Vernon). While bringing up the young children, Val had two horses which she hunted with the Hurworth and Bedale Foxhounds. One of these horses, a mare called “Royal Raintree” proved to be a very successful pointer for Val and went on to be a successful brood mare producing eight winners for Val and Ernie.

In 1974 Val went to work for T D (David) Barron. In 1975 Val took out her Amateur Rider's licence under National Hunt Rules. On 14 February 1976, Val became the first woman to race against male professional jockeys, and the first to ride over hurdles, at Catterick Racecourse. In May 1976, Val became the first amateur woman to beat professional jockeys over jumps when she rode Silver Gal, trained by Barron, to win the Yarridge Novices Hurdle (Division Two) at Hexham Racecourse. In the same race were professional jockeys including Paddy Broderick and Colin Tinkler. Prior to this, all wins by female jockeys in England had been against amateurs, in both flat and jumps. (Three months after Greaves' win, Jenny Hembrow won on Jim Hardy at Newton Abbot Racecourse). In 1980 Val took out her Amateur Rider's licence under Flat rules and was still riding in 1987. Val worked for David Barron for almost 40 years until her Parkinson's became too severe to continue.

In May 2004, the charity Racing Welfare paid tribute to Greaves by holding the "Val Greaves – a lifetime in racing – Maiden Stakes", run over one and half miles at York Racecourse.
