= Bay Malton =

British Thoroughbred racehorse

- Sire: Sampson
- Grandsire: Blaze
- Dam: Cade mare
- Damsire: Cade
- Sex: Stallion
- Foaled: 1760
- Country: Great Britain
- Colour: Bay
- Breeder: Mrs Ayrton
- Owner: Mr Fenton; 2nd Marquis of Rockingham

Major wins
- Match against Gimcrack (1765); Great Subscription Purse (1766)

Bay Malton (1760–1786) was a successful British Thoroughbred racehorse of the 18th century.

A bay horse, as the name would suggest, he was bred by a Mrs. Ayrton of Malton and foaled in 1760. He was sired by Sampson, and was a full brother to Treasurer.

In May 1764, in the name of Mr. Fenton, owner of his brother Treasurer, Bay Malton made his racecourse debut and won a 160 guinea sweepstake against Mr. Thompson's Snap. After this he was sold to the Marquis of Rockingham. For Lord Rockingham he won a 500 guinea sweepstake over the Beacon course at Newmarket in April 1765. Later that year, Bay Malton beat the esteemed Gimcrack, thought to be the best horse in Newmarket, 'very easy'. Amongst other important victories, he won the Great Subscription Purse at York, beating the horse that would be one of the future major sires in racing, Herod. His most memorable victory came at Newmarket's second Spring Meeting in April 1767 where he beat Herod again, Turf and Ascham in a race that was said to have brought more people to the racecourse than had ever been seen before.

The Bay Malton is commonly associated with John Singleton who rode him in all his races except the debut at Malton and the match against Gimcrack.

After retiring, he stood as a private stallion at Lord Rockingham's stud and died aged 26, at Wentworth.

The Bay Horse pub in York is believed to be named after the Bay Malton.

== Bibliography ==
- Tanner, Michael; Cranham, Gerry (1992). Great Jockeys of the Flat. Enfield, Middlesex: Guinness Publishing. ISBN 978-0-85112-989-1.
- Whyte, James Christie (1840). History of the British Turf, from the earliest period to the present day, Volume I. London: H. Colburn. OL 6544990M.
