= Colt by Fidget =

British Thoroughbred racehorse

- Sire: Fidget
- Grandsire: Florizel
- Dam: Highflyer mare
- Damsire: Highflyer
- Sex: Stallion
- Foaled: 1794
- Country: Great Britain
- Colour: Brown
- Breeder: 5th Duke of Bedford
- Owner: Duke of Bedford
- Trainer: Matthew Stephenson
- Record: 2:1-0-0

Major wins
- Epsom Derby (1797)

The Colt by Fidget (1794 – after 1799) is a name used to refer to an otherwise nameless British Thoroughbred racehorse. In a career that lasted from June 1797 to April 1798 he ran at least twice and won once. On his racecourse debut in the summer of 1797 he won The Derby. He was unplaced on his only other confirmed race.

== Background ==
The Fidget Colt was a brown horse bred by his owner the 5th Duke of Bedford. Until 1913, there was no requirement for British racehorses to be named, and in the late eighteenth century it was common for horses to be known by their owner, colour, sex and pedigree rather than by an official name. The Duke of Bedford's previous Derby winner had been known as "the Florizel colt" or "the Brother to Fidget" during his three-year-old season, but was later given the name Eager. The Fidget Colt, however, was never given an official name: he was known only as "the Fidget colt" or "the colt by Fidget".

The colt's dam, an unnamed mare by Highflyer was a half-sister to the notable broodmare Young Giantess, who produced the Derby winner Eleanor and was the grand-dam of two others in Phantom and Priam. Fidget was not a particularly important stallion: in the year of the Derby winner's birth Fidget was standing at Woburn in Bedfordshire at a fee of three guineas, making him the cheapest of the four stallions at the stud.

== Racing career ==
=== 1797: three-year-old season ===
On 2 June 1797, The Fidget Colt made his racecourse debut in the Derby at Epsom. Running as "D. of Bedford's br c by Fidget out of a sister to Pharamond" he started at odds of 10/1 in a field of seven runners, with Sir Frank Standish's Sir Peter colt (later named Stamford) sent off the 11/8 favourite. Ridden by John Singleton, Jr., he won from the 20/1 outsider Escalus with Plaistow third and the favourite fourth.

=== 1798: four-year-old season ===
On 11 April "D. of Bedford's c. by Fidget out of Caelia's dam" reappeared after a break of ten months at Newmarket Racecourse in the third class of the Oatlands Stakes. He carried a weight of 102 pounds in the handicap race over the two mile "Ditch In" course and finished seventh behind the 1796 St Leger winner Ambrosio.

== Pedigree ==
Pedigree of The Fidget Colt (GB), brown, 1794
| Sire Fidget (GB) 1783 | Florizel; 1768 | Herod* | Tartar* |
| Sire Fidget (GB) 1783 | Florizel; 1768 | Herod* | Cypron* |
| Sire Fidget (GB) 1783 | Florizel; 1768 | Cygnet mare | Cygnet |
| Sire Fidget (GB) 1783 | Florizel; 1768 | Cygnet mare | Young Cartouch mare |
| Sire Fidget (GB) 1783 | Matchem mare 1777 | Matchem* | Cade* |
| Sire Fidget (GB) 1783 | Matchem mare 1777 | Matchem* | sister 2 to Miss Partner* |
| Sire Fidget (GB) 1783 | Matchem mare 1777 | Syphon mare | Syphon |
| Sire Fidget (GB) 1783 | Matchem mare 1777 | Syphon mare | Shakespeare mare |
| Dam Highflyer mare (GB) 1784 | Highflyer; 1774 | Herod* | Tartar* |
| Dam Highflyer mare (GB) 1784 | Highflyer; 1774 | Herod* | Cypron* |
| Dam Highflyer mare (GB) 1784 | Highflyer; 1774 | Rachel | Blank |
| Dam Highflyer mare (GB) 1784 | Highflyer; 1774 | Rachel | Regulus mare |
| Dam Highflyer mare (GB) 1784 | Giantess; 1769 | Matchem* | Cade* |
| Dam Highflyer mare (GB) 1784 | Giantess; 1769 | Matchem* | sister 2 to Miss Partner* |
| Dam Highflyer mare (GB) 1784 | Giantess; 1769 | Molly Longlegs | Babraham |
| Dam Highflyer mare (GB) 1784 | Giantess; 1769 | Molly Longlegs | Foxhunter mare (Family:6-a) |

* Colt by Fidget is inbred 3S x 3D to the stallion Herod, meaning that he appears third generation on the sire side of his pedigree and third generation on the dam side of his pedigree.

* Colt by Fidget is inbred 3S x 3D to the stallion Matchem, meaning that he appears third generation on the sire side of his pedigree and third generation on the dam side of his pedigree.
