= John Singleton (jockey, born 1715) =

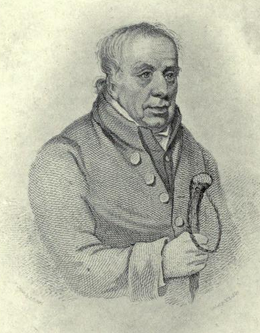
- Engraving of John Singleton, taken from A History of the English Turf, 1901

Personal information
- Born: 1715 Melbourne, East Riding of Yorkshire
- Died: c. 1795
- Occupation: Jockey

Horse racing career
- Sport: Horse racing
- Career wins: not known

Major racing wins
- York Great Subscription Purse (1766); Newmarket Sweepstakes v. Herod

Significant horses
- Bay Malton

John Singleton (1715 in Melbourne – c. 1795) was a British jockey, who has been described as "the pioneer of professional jockeys". He is commonly referred to as John Singleton I, John Singleton, Sr. or John Singleton the Elder to distinguish him from later relatives of the same name who were also jockeys.

== Career ==
=== Yorkshire ===
Singleton was born to John Singleton of Melbourne, Yorkshire and baptised on 10 May 1715, one of nine children. On the death of his father, he became a cattle herder, and started riding at the age of 10, on wild young racehorses that lived among the cattle on the common land of the moors above Melbourne. With this experience behind him, he became groom to Wilberforce Read of Grimthorpe. He is described as having "a broad chest, strong arm, quick eye, cool head and ample nerve."

After a particularly good riding performance, Read rewarded Singleton with the gift of a ewe. Singleton used this ewe for breeding, and with the sale of the offspring he was able to pay for the stallion Smiling Tom to cover his master's mare. The mating was a successful one, resulting in a filly called Lucy, which Singleton rode to victory in a number of races in 1737. These included the Subscription Plates at Hambleton, Morpeth, Stockton and Sunderland. He is said to have walked the entire 120 mile journey round the tracks of the North East, sleeping under haystacks.

=== Newmarket ===
By 1751, he had moved to the headquarters of British horse racing, Newmarket. In April 1756, he won a valuable 200 guinea match race against Mr Bowles' Trajan over the Beacon Course at Newmarket on the famous Matchem. In Newmarket, he became trainer and jockey to fellow Yorkshireman and future Prime Minister, the Marquis of Rockingham. He was used by Rockingham in all major races from the early 1760s until 1780, riding at Newmarket in the spring and Thixendale in Yorkshire in the summer.

His greatest successes came on the Bay Malton, named after the Yorkshire town where Rockingham had estates. In October 1765, without Singleton on board, the Bay Malton had raced Gimcrack, the most famous racehorse of the day. The Bay Malton beat Gimcrack 'very easy', winning Rockingham 9,000 guineas. At York in August 1766, the Bay Malton set a new record of 7 minutes 43 1/2 seconds for four miles in the Great Subscription Purse. It was also on the Bay Malton that he rode his most memorable victory at Newmarket's second spring meeting in April 1767. He beat the acclaimed horses Herod, Turf and Ascham at a race that brought more people to the racecourse than had ever been seen before. Afterwards, Singleton was presented with a specially commissioned gold cup with figures of horse and jockey.

== Later life ==
In 1769, Singleton married the widow of horseman Peter Jackson, and had a son, also called John. This John didn't follow his father into the riding profession and instead became a scholar at St. John's, Cambridge. After graduating he took up a post as a land agent near the family home in East Yorkshire.

The elder Singleton had a nephew, another John Singleton, who did become a jockey. John the nephew also came into the employ of Rockingham and won the first St. Leger in 1776. John Singleton the nephew, confusingly also had a son called John, who rode the winner of the 1797 Derby, although other scholars have cast doubt as to whether these latter John Singletons were relations at all.

In 1772, the elder Singleton was still riding at a weight of 8 st 7 lbs (54.0 kg), and it was said that "his head and nerves remained as cool as his chest and arms were strong and solid." He eventually retired from Rockingham's employ in 1780 and died, depending on which source is to be believed, in 1793, 1795 or 1799. He is buried in the churchyard at Great Givendale, near Grimthorpe, where his winnings had helped make the family's fortune.

Singleton was twice immortalised by famous equine portraitist, George Stubbs, in commissions by Lord Rockingham. In the first painting of c. 1765-67 he was portrayed riding Bay Malton. In the second he is on board Rockingham's bay Scrub, standing by a lake possibly at Wentworth.

== Journals ==
English, Barbara (1984). "Patterns of Estate Management in East Yorkshire, c. 1840 – c. 1880". The Agricultural History Review. 32 (1). British Agricultural History Society: 29–48. JSTOR 40274302.

== Bibliography ==
- Cook, Theodore Andrea (1901). A History of the English Turf (Vol. 2). London: H. Virtue & Co.
- Tanner, Michael; Cranham, Gerry (1992). Great Jockeys of the Flat. Enfield, Middlesex: Guinness Publishing. ISBN 978-0-85112-989-1.
- Whyte, James Christie (1840). History of the British Turf, from the earliest period to the present day, Volume I. London: H. Colburn. OL 6544990M.
