= John Singleton (jockey, born 1776) =

John Singleton Jr.
Personal information
- Born: 1776 France
- Died: 1802 (aged 25–26) Newmarket, Suffolk
- Occupation: Jockey

Horse racing career
- Sport: Horse racing

Major racing wins
- Major races Epsom Derby (1797); Epsom Oaks (1791, 1793); St Leger (1802)

Significant horses
- Caelia, Colt by Fidget, Orville, Portia

John Singleton (1776–1802) was an English horse racing jockey of the late 18th and early 19th century. He was actually the third John Singleton from the same family to achieve prominence in racing circles, following his father John and his great uncle John.

His father John married the daughter of the groom at his master Lord Rockingham's stud. Singleton was the product of this marriage and was born in France. He was being lined up to go into a medical career, under the tutelage of his maternal uncle who was a surgeon in Sheffield. Instead, he ran away to Newmarket to the stables of the Duke of Bedford.

For Bedford, Singleton rode to victory in three British Classic Races – the 1791 Oaks on Portia (aged just, the 1793 Oaks on Caelia and, his most famous victory, the 1797 Derby on an unnamed colt by Fidget. Back in his family's native Yorkshire he also won the 1802 St. Leger on Orville for Lord Fitzwilliam, who had inherited the estates of his uncle, Lord Rockingham, the man who had provided Singleton's father and great uncle with so many of their victories, and also employed his maternal grandfather as stud groom.

Singleton died two months later at the age of 26, "highly respected, esteemed and lamented" by the Newmarket racing community.

== Major wins ==
(United Kingdom) Great Britain

- Epsom Derby – Colt by Fidget (1797)
- Epsom Oaks – Portia (1791), Caelia (1793)
- St Leger – Orville (1802)

== Bibliography ==
- Mortimer, Roger; Onslow, Richard; Willett, Peter (1978). Biographical Encyclopaedia of British Racing. London: Macdonald and Jane's. ISBN 0-354-08536-0.
- Tanner, Michael; Cranham, Gerry (1992). Great Jockeys of the Flat. Enfield, Middlesex: Guinness Publishing. ISBN 0-85112-989-7.
