= John Singleton (jockey, died c. 1789) =

British jockey

John Singleton (died c.1789), sometimes known as John Singleton Jr. to distinguish him from his uncle, was a British Thoroughbred horse racing jockey of the 18th century. He is primarily remembered as the winner of the first ever British Classic race, the 1776 St. Leger on Alabaculia, owned by the Marquis of Rockingham, although the race was neither known then as the St. Leger, nor called a classic until much later.

After his big race success, Singleton spent time in France, as trainer to the Duke of Orleans, but this employment came to an end with the coming of the French Revolution. He returned to race-riding in England, having his final ride at Chester in 1784. He died in poverty five years later in a Chester workhouse. He had married the daughter of Rockingham's stud groom and had a son, another John Singleton, who won the 1797 revival of the Derby.

== Bibliography ==
- Tanner, Michael; Cranham, Gerry (1992). Great Jockeys of the Flat. Enfield, Middlesex: Guinness Publishing. ISBN 0-85112-989-7.
- Cook, Theodore Andrea (1901). A History of the English Turf (Vol. 2). London: H. Virtue & Co.
