= Charles Cannon (jockey) =

British jockey

Charles Edward Cannon
Personal information
- Born: 1884
- Died: 1963 (aged 78–79)
- Occupation: Jockey

Horse racing career
- Sport: Horse racing

Charles Edward Cannon (1884-1963), was a British jockey.

Cannon was apprenticed to his father, Tom Cannon, Sr., as a jockey at 14. He won the last race at Stockbridge in 1898 on Moon Wave. Charles enlisted in the 19th Hussars Gloucestershire regiment and was commissioned as Second Lieutenant in the first World War. He saw action in Ypres, the Somme and other campaigns. Cannon was shot in the head, buried alive, and received shell shock and mustard gas injuries, which he recovered in Netley in 1919. Before the war, Cannon was an accomplished pianist playing at the Royal Albert Hall for Edward VII.

Cannon married Dorothy Thrush in 1916 and moved to West Wellow. They had nine children.
