= Stockbridge Racecourse =

Horse racing venue in Stockbridge, Hampshire, England

- Interactive map of Stockbridge Racecourse
- Location: Stockbridge, Hampshire
- Coordinates: 51.13°N 1.54°W
- Owned by: Defunct
- Date opened: c 1839
- Date closed: 7 July 1898
- Notable races: Bibury Stakes, Stockbridge Cup Stakes, Champagne Stakes, Produce Stakes, Earl of Grosvenor Purse

Stockbridge Racecourse was a horse racing venue in Hampshire, England which closed in 1898.

== History ==
The first racing at Stockbridge took place on Houghton Down from, at the latest, 1775, and possibly earlier. By 1839 a new course had been developed on Danebury Hill near Nether Wallop.

The course is associated with leading Victorian trainer John Day who, together with stable jockey Tom Cannon, sent out multiple Classic winners. He trained from stables at Danebury House, built in 1832 by Lord George Bentinck, adjacent to the track and now the headquarters of a winery. Another important, but short-lived figure in the history of the course was Harry, Marquis of Hastings who had horses trained at Stockbridge in the 1860s. A notable visitor to the track was King Edward VII, who whilst still Prince of Wales watched his horse, Counterpane, come last in the Stockbridge Cup and then fall down dead. It is reported that souvenir hunters pulled out every hair of its tail.

Horses were often entered and shown at the Swan Inn in Stockbridge. Race week was usually in June or July. The track had a straight mile and a severe 'elbow'. In the years before its closure, the major races at the course were:

- Bibury Stakes - a 1 1/2-mile handicap, worth £251 in 1898
- Stockbridge Cup Stakes - a 6 furlong race, worth £290
- Hurstborne Stakes - a 5 furlong race for two-year-olds, worth £622
- Arlington Plate - a mile handicap, worth £460
- Champagne Stakes - a 5 furlong race for two-year-olds, worth £340

== Closure ==
In 1898, the land on which the eastern end of the course stood was inherited by Marianne Vaudrey who strongly disapproved of gambling, and therefore refused to extend the lease. At the time, Jockey Club rules stated that all racecourses should have a straight mile and since Stockbridge's straight mile extended into this area of land, the course was forced to close. The final meeting took place on 7 July 1898.

After closure, the gallops served as a testing site for Spitfires during World War II. Meanwhile, the Bibury Club Grandstand, which opened in 1867, survived until 1973, when it was destroyed by fire. The ivy-covered ruins of the Grandstand remain, but are in a precarious condition.

Today, the ground on which the course stood is part of the Danebury Racing Stables estate owned by trainer Ken Cunningham-Brown.

The Southern half of the course is now part of an organic dairy farm farmed by A Burnfield & Sons Ltd.

== Bibliography ==
- Graham, Eric (2011). Stockbridge Racecourse - The Last Ten Years 1889 - 1898.
- Graham, Eric (2012). Stockbridge Racecourse - The Hastings' Era 1862 - 1868.
