= Eager (horse) =

British Thoroughbred racehorse

- Sire: Florizel
- Grandsire: Sir Hercules
- Dam: Matchem mare
- Damsire: Matchem
- Sex: Stallion / Gelding
- Foaled: 1788
- Country: Kingdom of Great Britain
- Colour: Brown
- Breeder: 5th Duke of Bedford
- Owner: Duke of Bedford
- Trainer: Matthew Stephenson
- Record: 22:10-7-1

Major wins
- Epsom Derby (1791); Match with Vermin (1791); Fortescue Stakes (1792); Jockey Club Plate (1792)

Eager (1788 – after 1795) was a British Thoroughbred racehorse. In a career that lasted from April 1791 to July 1795 he ran twenty-two times and won ten races. In 1791 he proved himself one of the best British colts of his generation, by winning The Derby and four other races. Eager won a further four races in 1792, but the level of his form declined thereafter and he won only one race in his last three seasons. Towards the end of his racing career he was gelded.

== Background ==
Eager was a brown colt bred by his owner the 5th Duke of Bedford. His sire, Florizel won several important races at Newmarket between 1772 and 1774 and went on to become a successful stallion, siring the 1780 Derby winner Diomed (later an important sire in the United States) and two winners of the St Leger. He was the sixth of sixteen foals produced by his dam an unnamed mare by Matchem who had previously produced Fidget, a successful racehorse and sire. The Duke sent the colt into training with his private trainer Matthew Stephenson who also rode him in some of his races, including the Derby.

== Racing career ==
=== 1791: three-year-old season ===
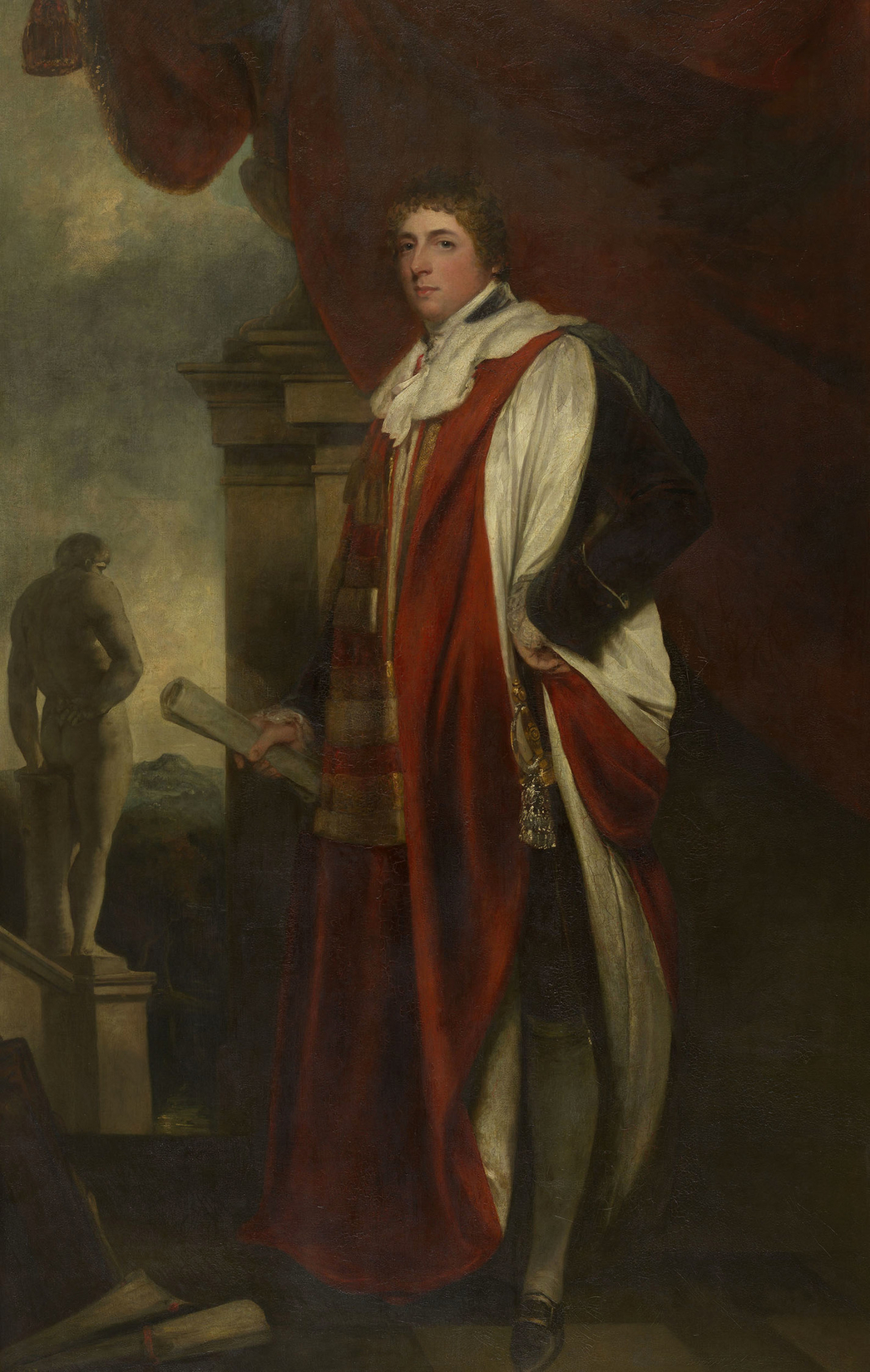
The Duke of Bedford, owner and breeder of the "brother to Fidget"

Until 1913 there was no requirement for British racehorses to be named, and in the late eighteenth century it was common for horses to be known by their owner, colour, sex and pedigree rather than by an official name. The horse who would later become known as Eager raced unnamed as a three-year-old in 1791, being usually referred to as the "brother to Fidget." Later publications refer to the horse as "Eager" when describing the events of the 1791 Derby.

On 25 April "D.of Bedford's brother to Fidget, by Florizel" made his first appearance in a Sweepstakes over ten furlongs ("Across the Flat") at Newmarket. He started the 1/4 favourite and won from his only opponent, a filly named Wagtail.

At Epsom on 9 June "D.of Bedford's br c by Florizel out of Fidget's dam" started the 5/2 second favourite for the Derby in a field of nine runners. Ridden by his trainer Matthew Stephenson, he won from Lord Foley's colt Vermin, the 5/4 favourite, with Proteus third and the Prince of Wales's colt St David in fourth. A month after his Derby win, the brother to Fidget raced at Stockbridge where he had two engagements. On 7 July he was allowed to walk over in a one-mile Sweepstakes when the other six horses entered were withdrawn by their owners. On the following day he started 1/3 favourite for a ten furlong Sweepstakes and won from his only opponent, Hector.

After a three-month break, the still unnamed colt reappeared for the autumn meetings at Newmarket. On 4 October his unbeaten run ended when he was defeated at level weights by Vermin in the 1400 Guineas Stakes, a subscription race over the two mile "Ditch In" course. A month later, the brother to Fidget met Vermin for a third time in a match race over the Ditch In course. Carrying six pounds less than his opponent, he upset the 4/1 odds to win a prize of 300 guineas.

=== 1792: four-year-old season ===
Fidget's brother was named Eager for the 1792 season and began his season with five engagements at the Newmarket spring meetings. The modifier "brother to Fidget" was still printed in racing literature in conjunction with his new name for a few years after he was officially named. Eager made his first appearance on 11 April in the Oatlands Stakes, a two-mile handicap which carried a first prize of more than £5,000, making it far more valuable than any of the Classics. He finished fifth of the twenty runners behind Toby, with the 1790 Derby winner Rhadamanthus and Vermin among the horses further back in the field. At the next meeting the Duke of Bedford claimed over £1,000 in prize money when Eager was allowed to walk over for a valuable Sweepstakes over the four mile Beacon Course. Four days later he ran in the two mile Fortescue Stakes in which he started 2/5 favourite and won from Vermin (beating Lord Foley's colt for the fourth time in five races) and a filly named Peggy. Eager won another prize for his owner without having to race when Mr Fox paid a forfeit when he withdrew his horse Mercutio from a scheduled match race on 7 May. On the following day Eager defeated the odds-on favourite Halbert to win the Jockey Club Plate over the Round Course, with Vermin third.

In summer Eager was sent to Stockbridge for a two-mile Sweepstakes on 27 June. When none of his five opponents appeared to contest the race he was allowed another walk over. A week later, Eager's winning run ended when he was beaten by Sir John Lade's horse Don Quixote in a four-mile Sweepstakes at Winchester.

A scheduled match against Vermin at Newmarket on 1 October did not materialise, as Lord Foley elected to withdraw his horse and pay a forfeit. Two days later Eager was beaten by Lord Grosvenor's six-year-old Skylark in a subscription race over the Beacon Course. On his final start of the year on 20 October Eager lost a 200 guinea match race when he failed to concede twelve pounds to Lord Clermont's filly Volantè.

=== 1793: five-year-old season ===
Eager's five-year-old season was restricted to four races at Newmarket in the spring. On 2 April he failed to concede three pounds to Mr Chichester's horse Mendoza in a 500 guinea match over the Beacon Course. Two weeks later over the Round Course, Eager recorded his only win of the year in a Subscription race. He started at odds of 1/6 and defeated his only opponent, the Duke of Queensberry's Fergus. On 30 April Eager ran twice over the three mile Dutton's Course. He finished second to Mr O'Kelly's gelding Excitement when carrying top weight of 125 pounds in a Sweepstakes, and then finished last of the four runners in a subscription race behind Coriander later that afternoon.

=== 1794: six-year-old season ===
Eager reappeared as a six-year-old in a £50 subscription race over Dutton's Course on 9 May and finished third of the five runners behind Gabriel and Spider. This proved to be his last race for the Duke of Bedford: before his next race he entered into the ownership of Mr Morant.

On 3 September Eager appeared in a race at Egham. The race was run in a series of four mile heats, with the prize going to the first horse to win twice. Eager finished second in the first heat and fourth in the second before being withdrawn from the contest.

=== 1795: seven-year-old season ===
Eager's final season comprised two races in heats run in summer. On 12 July at Ascot he appeared in the colours of Mr Wood and finished third and fourth in the first two heats before being withdrawn. On 30 July he ran in a race at Blandford when he ran in the ownership of Mr Stag. He finished second in both heats to Mr Hyde's Highflyer horse. In this race he was recorded as being a gelding.

== Pedigree ==
Pedigree of Eager (GB), brown, 1788
Sire Florizel (GB) 1768	Herod; 1758	Tartar	Partner*
Sire Florizel (GB) 1768	Herod; 1758	Tartar	Meliora
Sire Florizel (GB) 1768	Herod; 1758	Cypron	Blaze
Sire Florizel (GB) 1768	Herod; 1758	Cypron	Salome
Sire Florizel (GB) 1768	Cygnet mare 1761	Cygnet	Godolphin Arabian*
Sire Florizel (GB) 1768	Cygnet mare 1761	Cygnet	Godolphin Blossom
Sire Florizel (GB) 1768	Cygnet mare 1761	Young Cartouch mare	Young Cartouch
Sire Florizel (GB) 1768	Cygnet mare 1761	Young Cartouch mare	Ebony
Dam Matchem mare (GB) 1777	Matchem; 1748	Cade	Godolphin Arabian*
Dam Matchem mare (GB) 1777	Matchem; 1748	Cade	Roxana
Dam Matchem mare (GB) 1777	Matchem; 1748	Sister 2 to Miss Partner	Partner*
Dam Matchem mare (GB) 1777	Matchem; 1748	Sister 2 to Miss Partner	Brown Farewell
Dam Matchem mare (GB) 1777	Syphon mare 1770	Syphon	Squirt
Dam Matchem mare (GB) 1777	Syphon mare 1770	Syphon	Patriot mare
Dam Matchem mare (GB) 1777	Syphon mare 1770	Shakespeare mare	Shakespeare
Dam Matchem mare (GB) 1777	Syphon mare 1770	Shakespeare mare	Miss Meredith (Family:15)

* Eager is inbred 4S x 4D to the stallion Partner, meaning that he appears fourth generation on the sire side of his pedigree and fourth generation on the dam side of his pedigree.

* Eager is inbred 4S x 4D to the stallion Godolphin Arabian, meaning that he appears fourth generation on the sire side of his pedigree and fourth generation on the dam side of his pedigree.
