= Francis Russell, 5th Duke of Bedford =

English aristocrat (1765–1802)

His Grace The Duke of Bedford
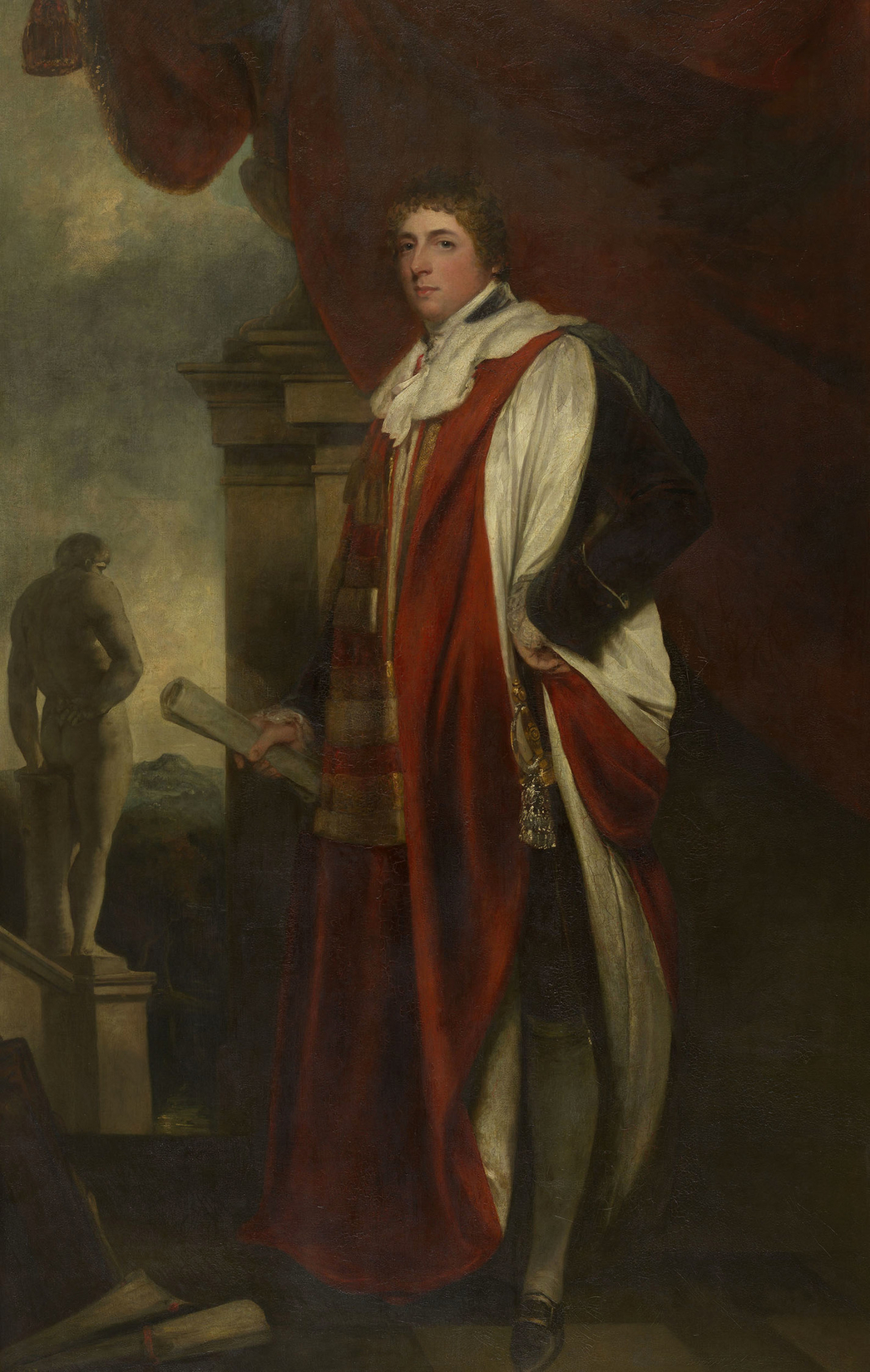
- Portrait by John Hoppner, c.1797
- Successor: John Russell, 6th Duke of Bedford
- Other titles: 5th Marquess of Tavistock; 9th Earl of Bedford; 9th Baron Russell; 7th Baron Russell of Thornhaugh; 5th Baron Howland
- Born: 23 July 1765
- Died: 2 March 1802 (aged 36)
- Parents: Francis Russell, Marquess of Tavistock; Elizabeth Keppel

Francis Russell, 5th Duke of Bedford (23 July 1765 – 2 March 1802) was an English aristocrat and Whig politician, responsible for much of the development of central Bloomsbury.

== Life ==
Francis Russell, eldest son of Francis Russell, Marquess of Tavistock (died 1767), by his wife, Elizabeth (died 1768), daughter of William Keppel, 2nd Earl of Albemarle, was born at Woburn Abbey and baptized on 20 August 1765 at St Giles in the Fields.

In January 1771 he succeeded his grandfather as Duke of Bedford, and was educated at Westminster School and Trinity College, Cambridge, afterwards spending nearly two years in foreign travel. Whilst abroad in 1784 he was involved in a menage a trois with Charles Maynard, second Viscount Maynard, and his wife Anne, Lady Maynard. This liaison was with Russell's grandmother's approval and it continued until 1787.

Regarding Charles James Fox as his political leader, he joined the Whigs in the House of Lords, and became a member of the circle of the Prince of Wales, afterwards George IV.

Having overcome some nervousness and educational defects, he began to speak in the House, and soon became one of the leading debaters in that assembly. He opposed most of the measures brought forward by the ministry of William Pitt, and objected to the grant of a pension to Edmund Burke, an action which drew down upon him a scathing attack from Burke's pen.

Bedford was greatly interested in agriculture. He established a model farm at Woburn, and made experiments with regard to the breeding of sheep. He was a member of the original Board of Agriculture, and was the first president of the Smithfield Club. In 1794 he commissioned the architect Henry Holland to design the Swan Hotel in Bedford. He died at Woburn on 2 March 1802, and was buried in the 'Bedford Chapel' at St. Michael's Church, Chenies, Buckinghamshire, England. The duke never married, and was succeeded in the title by his brother, John.

== Trivia ==
In 1795, when the government levied a tax on hair powder, as a form of protest Bedford abandoned the powdered and tied hairstyle commonly worn by men of that era in favour of a cropped, unpowdered style, making a bet with friends to do likewise. The new style became known as the "Bedford Level", a pun on an area of The Fens reclaimed by the family and also known as the "Bedford Level", as well as referring to Bedford's radical ("leveller") political views. It was also known as the "Bedford Crop". Although natural, the Bedford crop was usually styled with wax.

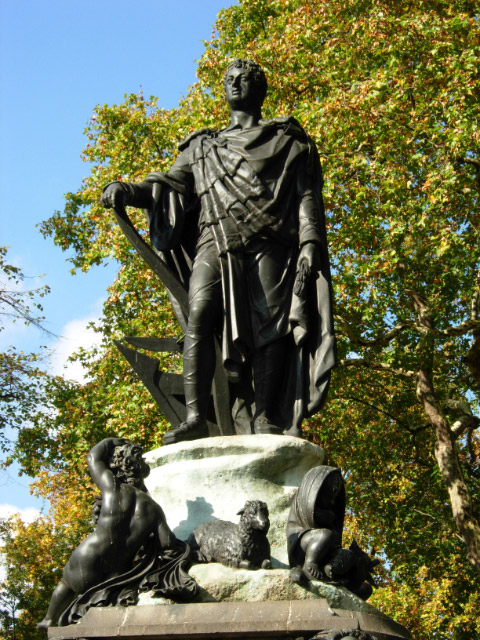
Francis Russell, Statue by Richard Westmacott in Russell Square

== Influence on Bloomsbury ==
Francis Russell is responsible for much of the development of central Bloomsbury. Following the demolition of Bedford House on the north side of Bloomsbury Square, he commissioned James Burton to develop the land to the north into a residential area. Russell Square was designed as the focal point of the development. He commissioned Humphry Repton to landscape the square after the success of Repton's work for the Duke at his Woburn Estate. A statue by Richard Westmacott, erected in 1809, has been conserved and stands on the south side of the square. It depicts Francis Russell as an agriculturalist with one hand on a plough, corn ears in the other and sheep at his feet. He looks out over the land he developed back towards Bloomsbury Square.

== Racing career ==
Bedford established a stud at Woburn Abbey and had considerable success as a breeder and owner of racehorses. When he was only twenty-one his first notable horse, Skyscraper, was foaled, a colt which went on to win The Derby of 1789. Bedford bred two other Derby winners, Eager (1788), and the nameless Colt by Fidget (1794), as well as two Oaks winners, Portia (1788) and Caelia (1790).

== See also ==
- Eponymous hairstyle: the Bedford crop

Peerage of England
Preceded by John Russell	Duke of Bedford; 1771–1802	Succeeded by John Russell
