= Hexham Racecourse =

Horse racing venue in Hexham, England

Hexham

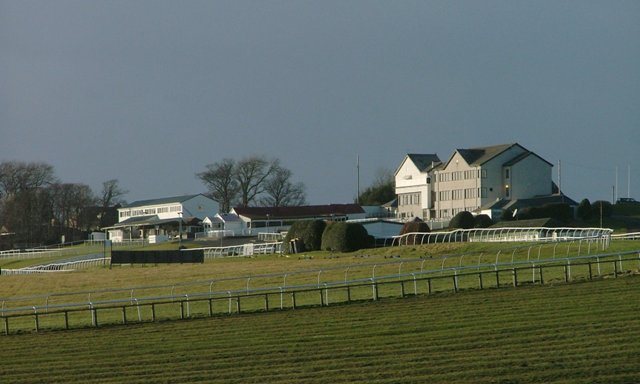
- The main buildings
- Interactive map of Hexham
- Location: Hexham, Northumberland
- Owned by: Hexham and Northern Marts
- Operated by: Independent
- Date opened: 1890
- Screened on: Sky Sports Racing
- Course type: National Hunt
- Notable races: Heart of all England Maiden Hunters’ Chase

Hexham Racecourse is a National Hunt racecourse located in Hexham, Northumberland. It is a left-handed course and 1m4f in circumference, set at a natural amphitheatre which has hosted racing for around 200 years. Racing began at Tyne Green in the early 18th century, but moved to the current site of Yarridge Heights in the early 19th century. A ten-year hiatus began in 1880 but CWC Henderson helped revive the sport in Hexham, and it has continued ever since, only interrupted by World War II.

== History ==
Racing likely began in Hexham in 1721, when a meeting was recorded as having taken place at Tyne Green where Hexham's fairs traditionally took place. A meeting was held on 3 May 1738 with a £20 purse available, and conditions for the meeting stated that 'every horse, mare or gelding that runs for the said purse shall run three heats, three times round the usual course on Tyne Green as now improved on each heat, having all the posts on the left hand and to be allowed betwixt heats to rubb half an hour'. Racing was stopped in the aftermath of the 1745 Jacobite Rebellion due to a feud between Ann Cook (the wife of John, licensee of the Black Bull in Hexham and a key patron of the races) and magistrate Sir Lancelot Allgood, along with his sister-in-law Hannah Glasse; Allgood refused to permit the races whilst the Cook family remained in Hexham. It did return, with records of racing from 1773. Records of racing at Tyne Green can also be found from 1793, when a three-day meeting was held, along with cockfighting at a site called Phoenix Pit.

At some point in the early 19th century, racing moved to Yarridge Heights. Spectators viewed the races from roughly where they do today, but races were held on the other side of the ridge. However, after a few decades it would be outcompeted by racing at Wark which flourished from the 1860s. Organising races at Yarridge became more challenging due to the lack of any permanent structures, with only tents protecting racegoers from the weather. Despite Wark Races having ended in 1878, Hexham closed in 1880 and a ten-year hiatus began.

Racing would return to Hexham under the stewardship of Charles William Chipchase Henderson, son of John Henderson MP. He was a successful businessman with powerful positions in the Consett Iron Company and Bedlington Colliery, and had during the 1880s sold the Durham Carpet Company and moved to Acomb. The local foxhunting gentry decided not long after his move to revive racing in Hexham and invited him to be honorary secretary, a position he accepted at a meeting reported on by the Hexham Courant:

A well-attended and representative meeting was held at Newcastle on Thursday last to consider the proposal to resuscitate the Hexham Steeplechase Meeting. It was decided to revive the meeting, the 23rd of April being selected as the date of the fixture. Mr C. W. C. Henderson of The Riding consented to act as hon secretary and treasurer, and Mr Mulcaster of Whitehaven has consented to act as clerk of the course. The following committee was appointed: Mr D. C. Dixon-Brown, Mr J. Liddell, Mr C. Liddell, Mr F. Straker, Mr C. Perkins and Mr Isaac Baty. There seems every prospect of the meeting being a very successful one.

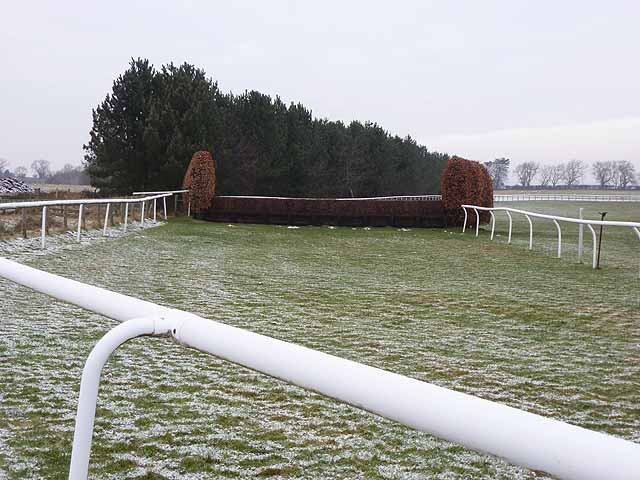
One of the fences, with the beech wings

Henderson embraced his new position and put much time and money into developing the racecourse. A six-race card with 31 participants was held on the intended date, proving to be a success. In the following few years, permanent wooden structures were constructed to serve as weighing and changing rooms and a fenced paddock was made. Eventually some buildings were painted in blue and yellow, Henderson's racing colours; this colour scheme is still used by the racecourse today. In 1907, Henderson bought the land and made further improvements, including planting the famous copper beech hedges used as the wings of the steeplechase fences to this day. It was the same year that had the first running of Hexham's biggest race, the Heart of all England Cup. This is Northumberland's most significant point-to-point championship. Charles Henderson died in December 1914 and his son Stephen took charge.

Racing continued between World War I and World War II, although Stephen Henderson faced challenges in this time during the poor economic situation of the 1920s. He secured the racecourse's financial position by turning it into a private limited company in 1926, in which he served as chairman and main shareholder. Further improvements were made in the 1930s. During the Second World War, Hexham Racecourse was requisitioned and utilised as an ammunition store.

Kit Patterson took over running of the course in 1946, following on from his father William who managed the company's affairs during wartime. He would run the course until 1990, when Charles Henderson's great grandson Maj Charles Enderby took over after a twenty-year military career.

In the 1990s, major improvements were undertaken: a new weighing room was completed in 1990, a new watering system in 1997, and the Ramshaw Stand (partially financed by the Levy Board) in 1998. The course also witnessed the hurdling debuts of One Man and Red Marauder in this decade. In 2015, the course celebrated its 125 anniversary. In 2016, Hexham Racecourse was purchased by current owners Hexham and Northern Marts and Charles Enderby became a consultant, ending his 26-year stint in charge. £500,000 had been invested into the course in the last decade of his tenure.

In 2017, the racecourse office was relocated to the racecourse. The racecourse received its first terrestrial TV broadcast in decades on ITV in 2025, the year a new stand named after Queen Camilla was opened by its namesake. The course also featured on TV in 2021, when Matt Baker: Travels with Mum & Dad saw the family visit the racecourse along with local stables.

== Course ==
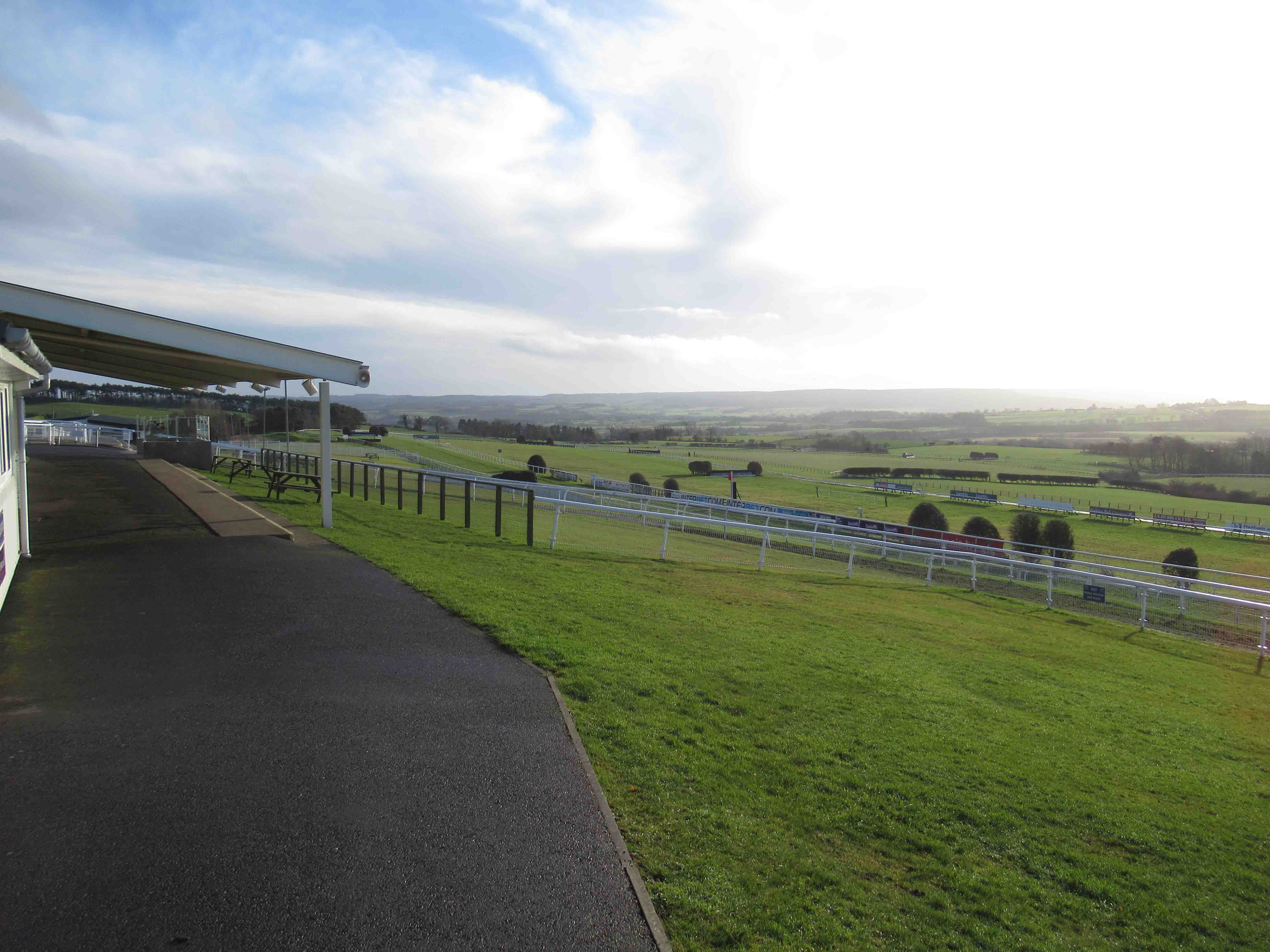
The view from the enclosures

Hexham Racecourse hosted fixtures in 2026 between March and June, and October to December. No race days take place in January or February due to its northerly and exposed location, with the course 800 feet above sea level. The course was scheduled to host fifteen rules fixtures and two point-to-point meetings (in May and November, run over a ten-furlong circuit) in 2026.

Hosting only National Hunt races, Hexham is a left-handed course with undulations and a notably steep climb from the end of the back straight to the finish line. A circuit is roughly one mile and four furlongs and it is noted for a testing finish, which can catch horses out that appear to be travelling well before the uphill climb. The chase course is inside the hurdles one on the near straight and on the outside down the back, and there is a spur from the main chase course parallel to the hurdles track to take the runners in front of the enclosures for finishes (the run-in here is about a furlong). The ten fences per circuit are generally regarded as easy.

== Bibliography ==
- Gill, James (1975). Racecourses of Great Britain. London: Barrie & Jenkins. ISBN 0-2142-0090-6.
- White, John (2003). Racecourses. London: Collins. ISBN 0-00-716655-9.
