= Jockey =

Someone who rides horses in horse racing

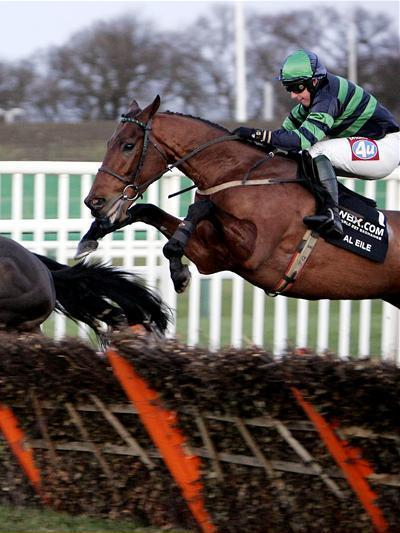
A jockey riding in a hurdle race

A jockey is someone who rides horses in horse racing or steeplechase racing, primarily as a profession. The word also applies to camel riders in camel racing. The word "jockey" originated from England and was used to describe the individual who rode horses in racing. They must be light, typically around a weight of 100–120 lb. (45–55 kg), and physically fit. They are typically self-employed, and are paid a small fee from the horse trainer, whose colors they wear while competing in a race. They also receive a percentage of the horse's winnings. The job has a very high risk of debilitating or life-threatening injuries, not only from racing accidents but also, because of strict weight restrictions, from eating disorders.

Originally, in most countries, the jockeys were all male. Over time, female jockeys have been allowed to ride; there are now many successful and well-known female jockeys.

== Etymology ==
The word is by origin a diminutive of jock, the Northern English or Scots colloquial equivalent of the first name John, which is also used generically for "boy" or "fellow" (compare Jack, Dick), at least since 1529. A familiar instance of the use of the word as a name is in "Jockey of Norfolk" in Shakespeare's Richard III. v. 3, 304.

In the 16th and 17th centuries the word was applied to horse-dealers, postilions, itinerant minstrels and vagabonds, and thus frequently bore the meaning of a cunning trickster, a "sharp", whence the verb to jockey, "to outwit", or "to do" a person out of something. The current meaning of a person who rides a horse in races was first seen in 1670. Polly Adler also used "jock" as shorthand for "jockey" in her 1953 book, A House Is Not a Home.

== Physical characteristics ==
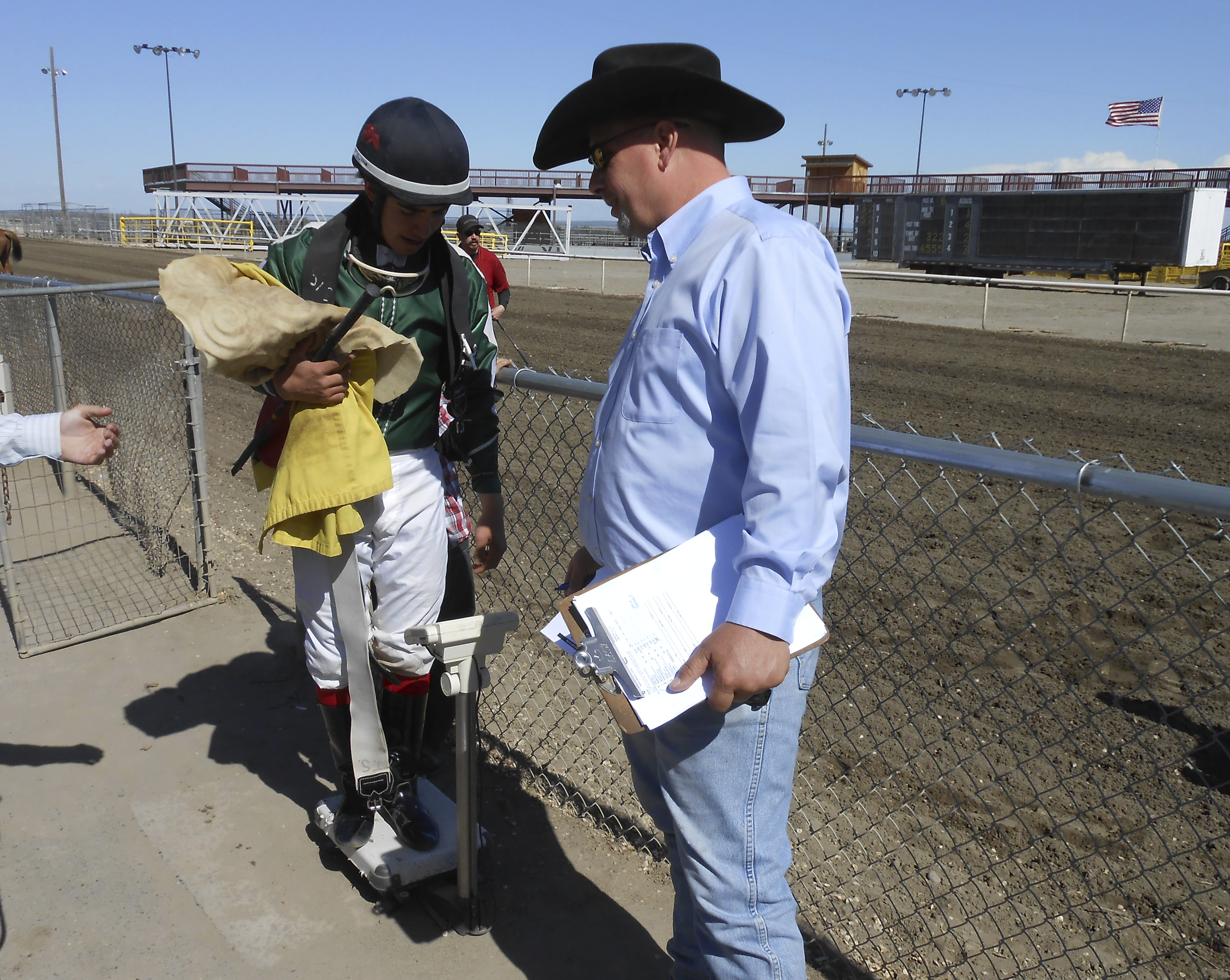
Jockey being weighed post-race, holding equipment

Jockeys must be light to ride at the weights which are assigned to their mounts. There are horse carrying weight limits that are set by racing authorities. The Kentucky Derby, for example, has a weight limit of 126 lb (57 kg) including the jockey's equipment. The weight of a jockey racing on the flat usually ranges from 108 to 118 lb (49 to 54 kg). Despite their light weight, they must be able to control a horse that is moving at 40 mph (64 km/h) and weighs 1,190.5 lb (540.0 kg). Though there is no height limit for jockeys, they are usually fairly short due to the weight limits.

Jockeys racing on the flat typically stand around 4 ft 10 in (147 cm) to 5 ft 7 in (170 cm). Jump jockeys are often taller, with multiple examples over 5 ft 10 in (178 cm). Lester Piggott, considered one of the greatest flat jockeys, was nicknamed "Longfellow" for his height of 5 ft 8 in (173 cm), and Jack Andrews, who is 6 ft 4 in (193 cm), can ride at a weight of 142 lb (64 kg). Bruce Hobbs was at 6 ft 1.5 in (186.7 cm) the tallest jockey ever to win the Grand National.

== Role ==
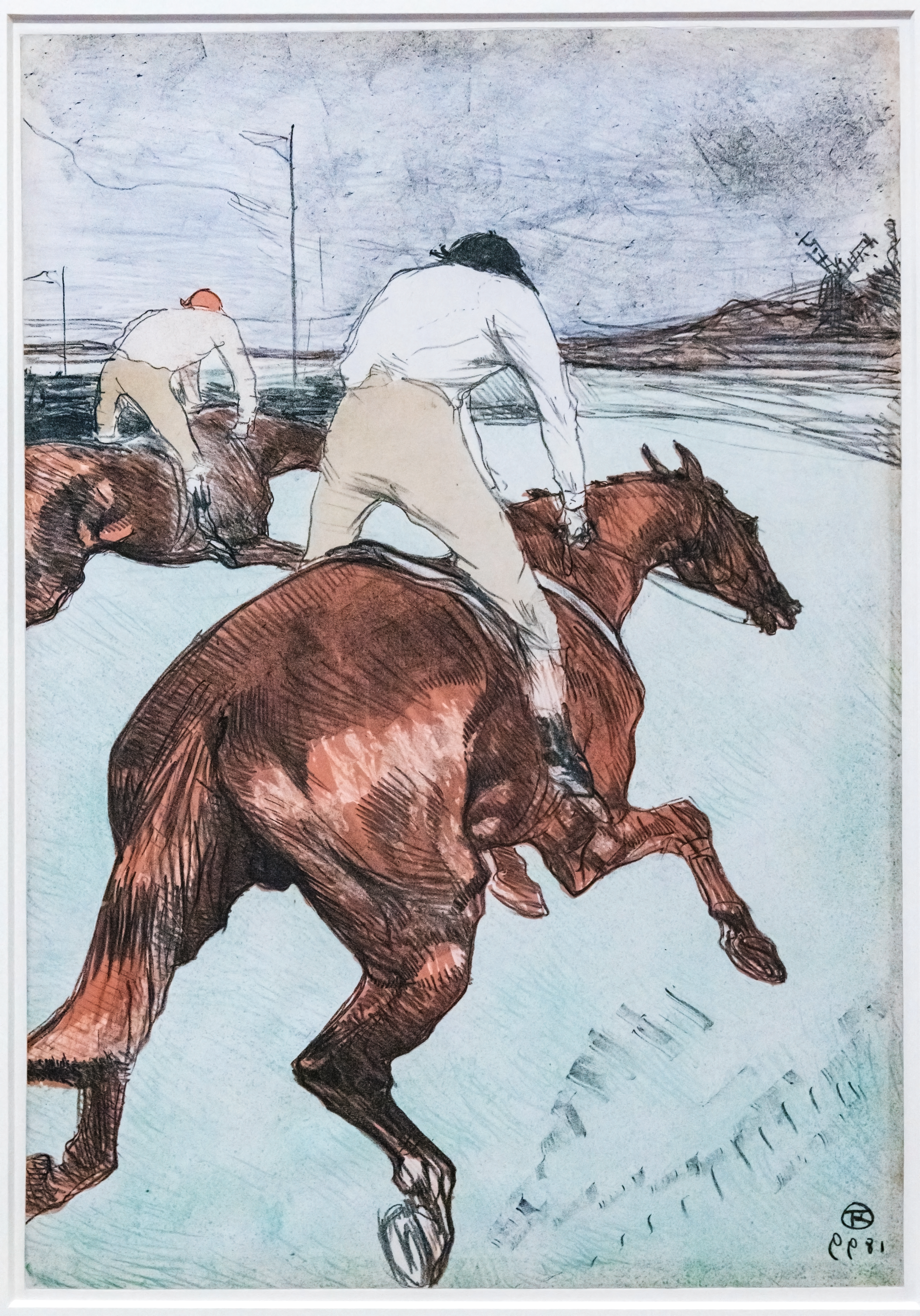
Toulouse-Lautrec – The Jockey (1899)

Jockeys are normally self employed, nominated by horse trainers to ride their horses in races, for a fee (which is paid regardless of the prize money the horse earns for a race) and a percentage of the purse winnings. In Australia, employment of apprentice jockeys is in terms of indenture to a master (a trainer); and there is a clear employee-employer relationship. When an apprentice jockey finishes their apprenticeship and becomes a "fully fledged jockey", the nature of their employment and insurance requirements change because they are regarded as "freelance", like contractors. Jockeys often cease their riding careers to take up other employment in racing, usually as trainers. In this way the apprenticeship system serves to induct young people into racing employment.

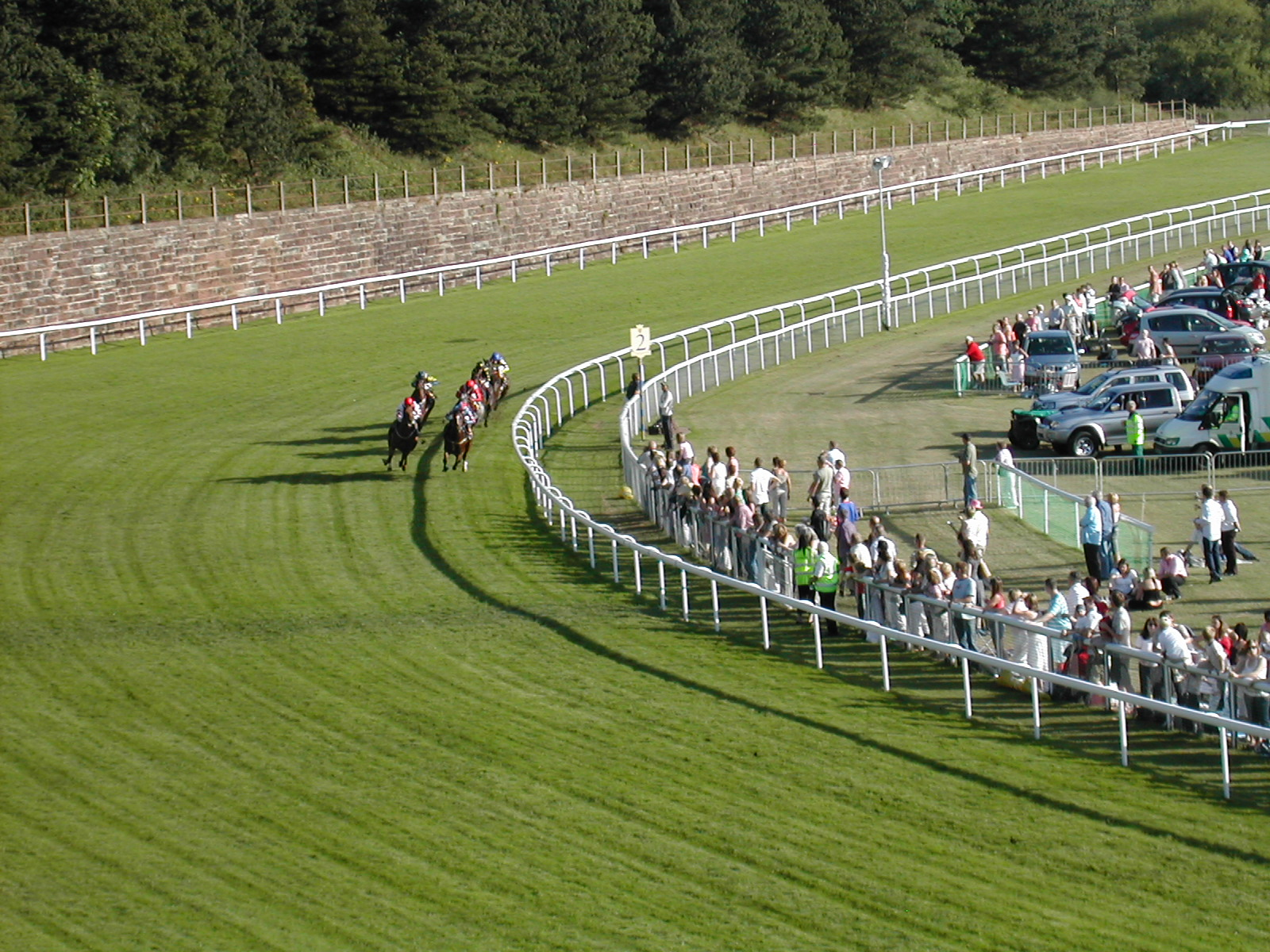
Six jockeys and their horses taking a curve

Jockeys usually start out when they are young, exercising horses in the morning for trainers, and entering the riding profession as apprentice jockeys. It is normally necessary for an apprentice jockey to ride a minimum of about 20 barrier trials successfully before being permitted to ride in races. An apprentice jockey is known as a "bug boy" because the asterisk that follows the name in the program looks like a bug. All jockeys must be licensed and usually are not permitted to bet on a race. An apprentice jockey has a master, who is a horse trainer, and the apprentice is also allowed to "claim" weight off the horse's back: in handicapped races, more experienced riders will have their horses given an extra amount of weight to carry, whereas a jockey in their apprenticeship will have less weight on their horse, giving trainers an incentive to hire these less-experienced jockeys. This weight allowance is adjusted according to the number of winners that the apprentice has ridden. After a four-year indentured apprenticeship, the apprentice becomes a senior jockey and usually develops relationships with trainers and individual horses. Sometimes senior jockeys are paid a retainer by an owner which gives the owner the right to insist the jockey ride their horses in races.

Racing modeled on the English Jockey Club spread throughout the world with colonial expansion.

== Racing colours ==
The colours worn by jockeys when racing horses owned by Cyrus S. Poonawalla

The colours worn by jockeys in races are the registered "colours" of the owner or trainer who employs them. The practice of riders wearing colours probably stems from medieval times when jousts were held between knights. However, the origins of racing colours of various patterns may have been influenced by racing held in Italian city communities since medieval times. Purple, gold and or yellow/nude, Such traditional events are still held on town streets and are known for furious riding and the colorful spectacle they offer.

While the term "silks" is used in the United States to refer to racing colours, technically "silks" are the white breeches and bib, stock or cravat. Obtaining them is a rite of passage when a jockey is first able to don silken pants and colors in their first race ride. At one time silks were invariably made of silk chosen for being a lightweight fabric, though now synthetics are used instead. Silks and their colours are important symbols of loyalty and festivity.

Many of the silks bear chequered patterns, polka dots, stripes or icons such as quatrefoils. The wearing of silks originated in the United Kingdom. They were first mentioned in 1515, and the current system was formally established in the 1700s. Horses are identified as they race by the colourful, traditional silk shirts and helmets their jockeys wear, these representing the horses' owners. The colours need to be significantly different to serve this purpose and are registered by each Australian state's Principal Racing Authority (PRA). The silks of famous jockeys, horses and owners can fetch high prices at auction, suggesting the esteem in which history and tradition are held in horse racing. Although Racing Australia requires that all jockeys wear approved helmets and safety vests, racegoers are unaware of this latter safety equipment as it is worn beneath the silks. Jockeys also wear a 'skivvy' under the silks. On race days the skivvy chosen is a lightweight mesh or microfibre bodysuit, sleeved or sleeveless, whereas, for track work, a more heavy-duty version may be worn. Summarising, during an Australian race day, jockeys must wear the following: the helmet (or skullcap), goggles, silks, vest, breeches, gloves, boots, saddle and girth and stirrups.

== Awards ==
Various awards are given annually to jockeys by organizations affiliated with the sport of thoroughbred racing in countries throughout the world. They include:

- Australia
  - Scobie Breasley Medal
- Canada
  - Avelino Gomez Memorial Award
- United Kingdom
  - Lester Award
  - Champion Flat Jockey Award
  - Champion Jump Jockey Award
- United States
  - George Woolf Memorial Jockey Award
  - Isaac Murphy Award

== Risk factors ==
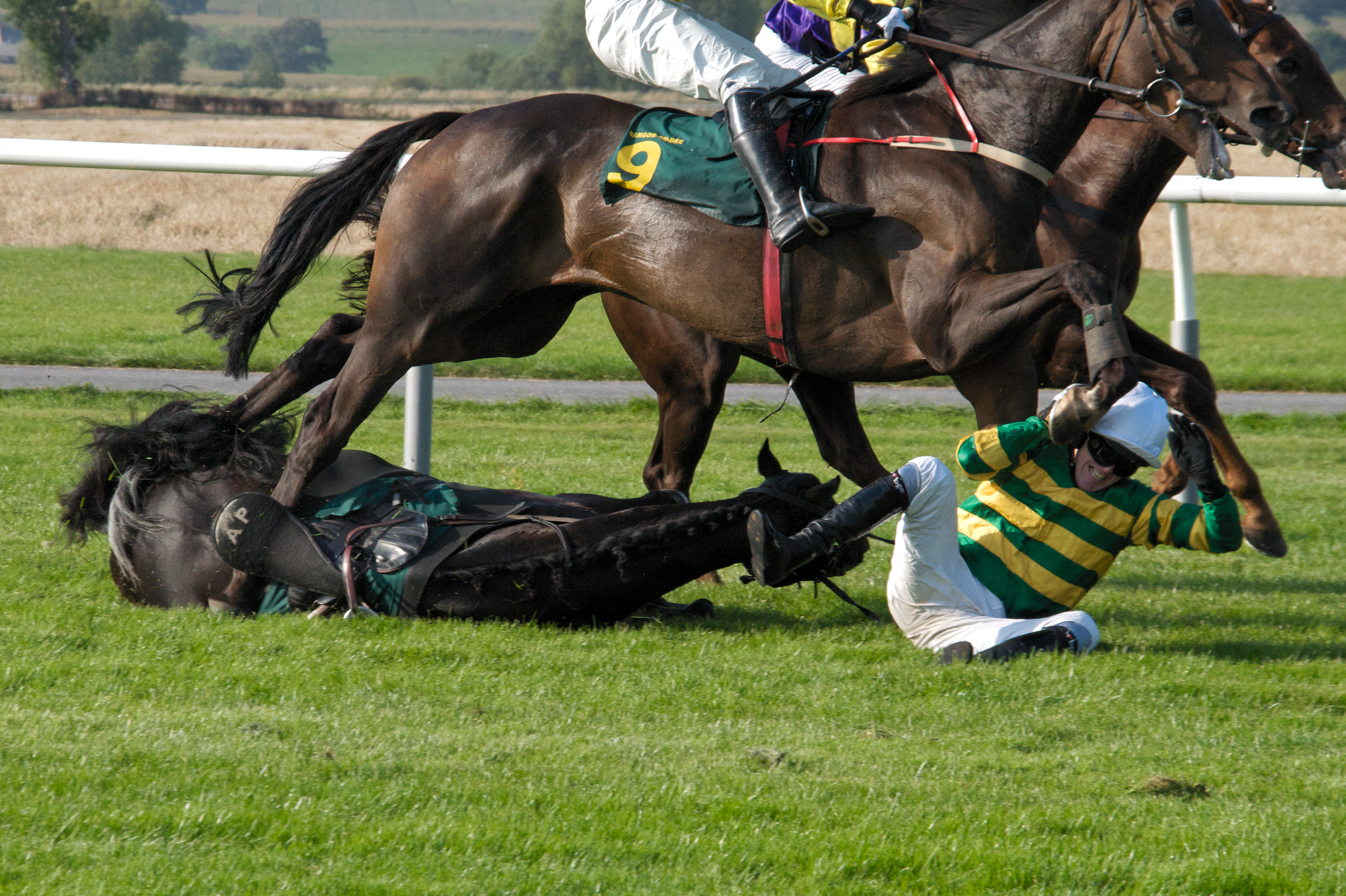
A race fall

Horse racing is a sport where jockeys may incur permanent, debilitating, and even life-threatening injuries. Chief among them include concussion, bone fractures, arthritis, trampling, and paralysis. Jockey insurance premiums remain among the highest of all professional sports. Between 1993 and 1996, 6,545 injuries occurred during official races for an injury rate of 606 per 1,000 jockey years. In Australia race riding is regarded as being the second most deadly job, after offshore fishing. From 2002 to 2006 five deaths and 861 serious injuries were recorded.

Eating disorders (such as bulimia) are also very common among jockeys, as they face extreme pressure to maintain unusually low (and specific) weights, sometimes within a five-pound (2.3 kg) margin. The bestselling biography, Seabiscuit: An American Legend chronicled the eating disorders of jockeys living in the first half of the twentieth century. As in the cases of champion jockey Kieren Fallon and Robert Winston, the pressure to stay light has been blamed in part for jockeys suffering agonies of thirst from dehydration while racing. Sports Dietitians Australia warns: "Dehydration and energy depletion may compromise concentration and coordination." Indeed, recent research carried out in association with the Irish Turf Club measured the effects of rapid weight loss to make weight in professional and apprentice jockeys and found significant levels of dehydration; however, cognitive function was maintained, suggesting jockeys had become accustomed to performing in a dehydrated state and had potentially developed a preventative mechanism to enable them to perform under these conditions.

In January 2016 it was announced that the International Concussion and Head Injury Research Foundation (ICHIRF) will run a new study. Named 'Concussion in Sport' it will be the first study to take a detailed look at the effects of concussion on sports people, including on around 200 retired jockeys.

== Female jockeys ==
=== Australia ===
During the 1850s, women-only horse-racing events were held in Victoria, Australia; women were not permitted to ride as professional jockeys or on professional tracks with men.

Although women jockeys were barred from riding at registered race meetings, in the mid-1900s Wilhemena Smith rode as Bill Smith at north Queensland racecourses. She was nicknamed Bill Girlie Smith because she arrived on course with her riding gear on under her clothes and did not shower on course. It was only at the time of her death in 1975 that the racing world was officially told that Bill was really Wilhemena. Subsequent inquiries proved that William Smith was actually a woman who had been born Wilhemena Smith in a Sydney hospital in 1886. In an era when women were clearly denied equality, she had become known as a successful jockey in Queensland country districts as 'Bill Smith'. Elizabeth Williams Berry rode in Melbourne and internationally, disguised as a boy and using the name, Jack Williams.

During the late 1960s, restrictions against female trainers were lifted in Australia, but female jockeys were still confined to "ladies only" events, which were held on non-professional tracks. The Victoria Racing Club in 1974 permitted women jockeys to be registered for professional "ladies only" events. In 1978, racing rules in New Zealand were amended to permit women jockeys.

In the late 1970s, pioneers such as Pam O'Neill in Australia and Linda Jones from New Zealand forced jockey club officials to grant women the right to compete on an equal footing in registered races against men. They were unquestionably the first women jockeys to be licensed to ride in the metropolitan areas of Australia. Previously women had been riding against men in Australia at the unregistered "all-height" meetings. O'Neill created a world record for any jockey, male or female, when she rode a treble at Southport on her first day's riding. Australia's top woman jockey, Bev Buckingham, became the first woman in the Southern Hemisphere to win 1,000 races. In 1998, in a fall at the Elwick Racecourse (Hobart), she broke her neck. She used a wheelchair for some time afterward, but regained her strength and mobility and was able to walk again without assistance.

In 2004–05, Clare Lindop won the Adelaide jockeys' premiership and became the first woman to win a metropolitan jockeys' premiership in mainland Australia. In 2005, Andrea Leek became the first woman to ride the winner of the Grand National Hurdle (4,300 m) at Flemington when she won aboard Team Heritage.

In 2009 it was reported women account for 17% of jockeys in Victoria. But, they receive only 10% of the rides, and are often overlooked in favour of male jockeys, especially in the cities. In some regions of Australia about half of the apprentice jockey intakes are women.

In January 2015 at Mount Gambier, South Australia, all eight races on the card were won by women jockeys: Emily Finnegan (3 wins), Clare Lindop (2), Holly McKechnie (2) and Chelsea Jokic (1).

Michelle Payne became the first female jockey to win the Melbourne Cup on 3 November 2015.

=== Great Britain and Ireland ===
Women were initially banned from racing under Jockey Club rules in Britain, though records indicate that women rode, disguised as men, as early as 1804. In the Victorian era, Elizabeth Williams Berry of Australia, noted above, came to England and rode disguised as a man, continuing to use the name Jack Williams. To help her disguise, she smoked cigars and wore a bowler hat. In the 20th century, after many years of debate, a series of a dozen races was approved for female jockeys in 1972. Meriel Patricia Tufnell overcame childhood disability to ride the novice Scorched Earth to victory in the first race, the Goya Stakes at Kempton Park on 6 May 1972. In 1976 Valerie Greaves became the first amateur woman to "beat professionals under Rules" at Hexham Racecourse. In September, 1978, Karen Wiltshire, age 22, won a Salisbury handicap on The Goldstone, making her the first woman professional jockey to ride a winner in a British flat race. In 2024, Wiltshire published an account of the prejudice she had to deal with as a woman jockey in the 1970s. In 1996, Alex Greaves, the daughter of Valerie Greaves, became the first woman to ride in the Epsom Dash in Epsom Derby's 216-year history.

The first decade of the 21st century saw the profile of women jockeys rise considerably in British Flat racing. In 2005 Hayley Turner became Champion Apprentice rider, before becoming the first woman to ride 100 winners in a British season in 2008. Also in 2008, Kirsty Milczarek became the first woman to ride three winners at a single British race meeting, at Kempton in February. Milczarek rode 71 winners that year. This period saw the total number of female jockeys in British Flat racing rise significantly. Two further female jockeys have won the apprentice championship since Turner – Amy Ryan in 2012 and Josephine Gordon in 2016. This change has not applied in National Hunt racing, though amateur riders Nina Carberry and Katie Walsh (sister of Ruby Walsh) have gained success in Ireland and ridden winners at the Cheltenham Festival. In the 2010 National Hunt Chase at the Cheltenham Festival the winner and runner-up were both ridden by female jockeys. Katie Walsh was on board Poker de Sivola finishing ahead of Becauseicouldntsee which was ridden by Nina Carberry.

On Boxing Day 2015 Lizzie Kelly became the first female jockey to win a grade one race in Britain, on Tea For Two in the Kauto Star Novices' Chase at Kempton Park. Lizzie Kelly won another grade 1 in 2017. It was the Betway Bowl at the Grand National Festival, on Tea For Two. In the 2016/17 season Rachael Blackmore became the first female jockey to win the Irish Conditional Jockeys title. In 2018 Lizzie Kelly became the first female professional jockey to ride a winner at the Cheltenham Festival. She rode Coo Star Sivola in the Ultima handicap chase. In 2019 Bryony Frost became the first female jockey to ride a grade 1 winner at the Cheltenham Festival. She rode Frodon in the Ryanair Chase. In 2021, Rachael Blackmore became the first female jockey to win the Grand National, the most valuable jump race in Europe. The British Horseracing Authority (BHA) has set about encouraging the women who make up three quarters of the graduates from the two principal racing schools in the UK to stay in the profession as jockeys. However, there is far to go. Females only represent 25% of jockey licence holders in National Hunt races, and they receive just 6.5% of rides

=== New Zealand ===
In Thoroughbred racing in New Zealand women constitute over 40% of jockeys.

The first win by a woman in New Zealand was visiting Canadian jockey Joan Phipps, at Te Awamutu in November 1977.

Linda Jones is believed to be the first New Zealand woman to apply for an apprentice's licence, however she was turned down. She had ridden in a number of lady riders events over many years in New Zealand and overseas such as in Brazil, which highlighted that New Zealand and Australia were outliers in not allowing women to compete with male jockeys in professional races. She persevered and the New Zealand Racing Conference eventually accepted female jockeys. They became eligible to ride on 15 July 1978 with the first New Zealand woman to ride in a totalisator race in New Zealand being Joanne Hale (Giles) on that day at Waimate. Sue Day (Christchurch), Joanne Lamond (Oamaru) and Vivienne Kaye (Awapuni) also rode in later races on that same day.

Sue Day became the first New Zealand female jockey winner in a totalisator race against males on 22 July 1978 when she won with the Ned Thistoll-trained Jaws in the Waybrook Handicap at Timaru. Another female jockey riding then was Cherie Saxon (Hastings).

Linda Jones' first win was on Big Bickies at Te Rapa and soon after she won with Royal Petite, the first Open Handicap winner for a female jockey. Subsequent highlight wins for Jones were Lovaro in the Queen Elizabeth Handicap and Holy Toledo in the Wellington Derby on 22 January 1979 (possibly the first female jockey world-wide to win a Derby). Jones was also the first female jockey to win a professional race against males at a registered meeting in Australia, winning aboard Pay The Purple in the Labour Day Cup at Doomben Racecourse, Brisbane on May 7, 1979.

In 1982 Maree Lyndon was the first female jockey to win a Group I race in New Zealand when winning the New Zealand Cup on Sirtain.

In 1986 Trudy Thornton became the first woman jockey to ride in New Zealand's longest thoroughbred race, the Great Northern Steeplechase. In 1995, Tina Egan was the first woman to win the race.

In 1997 Catherine Hutchinson (née Tremayne) was the first female jockey to ride six winners in a day, which she did at Ruakaka.

In 2005 and 2006 Lisa Cropp won the New Zealand jockeys' premierships. In recent years the New Zealand jockeys premiership has been won by Lisa Allpress (2012, 2016, 2019 and 2020), Samantha Collett (2018) and Danielle Johnson (2021).

In April 2017 at Timaru eight of the nine races on the card were won by women jockeys: Alysha Collett, Kylie Williams, Tina Comignaghi, Amanda Morgan and Samantha Wynne.

On 10 October 2019 at Tauherenikau Racecourse all eight races were won by women riders: Rosie Myers (4 races), Lisa Allpress (2), Charlotte O'Beirne (A) and Leah Mischewski.

=== United States and Canada ===
There are many successful and well-known female jockeys, however, based on American statistics, women comprise only 14 percent of working jockeys and ride only 10 percent of all race starts. Only two percent ride at the elite level of Triple Crown races. Gender discrimination is widely viewed as the cause, as far more women are capable of making weight as a jockey, and in most other equestrian disciplines, an overwhelming majority of participants are women. A 1995 study found that the low percentage of women as jockeys was related to discrimination, whereas "in fact, women actually won more money than men who rode similar horses in similar races [and] outperformed men with the opportunities they got".

Eliza Carpenter (1851 – 1924) was an early African-American race horse owner. In Ponca City, Oklahoma, she trained horses for racing, becoming one of the few African-American stable owners in the West. When dissatisfied with the way a race was going, she sometimes would ride her own horses as a jockey, winning some races. Recorded names of her horses include "Irish Maid", "Blue Bird", "Jimmy Rain", "Sam Carpenter", and "Little Brown Jug", the last of which she reportedly raced at Tijuana, Baja California.

Anna Lee Aldred (1921 – 2006) was given a license at age 18 in 1939 at Agua Caliente Racetrack in Tijuana, Mexico, when officials were unable to find a rule that would bar women jockeys and she finished second by a nose in her first professional race. Hollywood stuntwoman Alice Van-Springsteen (1918 – 2008) also rode as a jockey and was one of the first women ever to receive a trainer's license for Thoroughbred horses.

Wantha Davis (1918 – 2012) was known to have won over 1,000 races in the 1930s, 40s and 50s, including a famous 1949, six furlong match-race against Johnny Longden at Agua Caliente. She rode at some state-sanctioned pari-mutuel tracks, but without a license, most events were of the dusty county fair and half-mile variety of the western circuit. Even though she was always in demand as a training jockey, her applications for a license were turned down in state after state.

Twelve years after Davis retired, the "modern era of female jockeys" began when Olympic equestrian and show jumping competitor Kathy Kusner, who had also ridden as a jockey, successfully sued the Maryland Racing Commission for a jockey's license in 1967 under the Civil Rights Act. She won her case in 1968 and became one of the earliest women to be licensed in the United States, though an injury prevented her from racing at the time. In late 1968, Penny Ann Early was the first woman to earn a mount as a licensed Thoroughbred jockey in the U.S., when she entered three races at Churchill Downs in November, but the male jockeys announced a boycott of those races, and so she could not ride. On 7 February 1969, Diane Crump was the first licensed woman rider to ride in a parimutuel Thoroughbred race in the United States at the Hialeah Park Race Track in Florida. She required a police escort to get to the paddock. Two weeks later, on 22 February at Charles Town in West Virginia, Barbara Jo Rubin became the first woman to win a race, and went on to win 11 of her first 22. Others soon followed suit and over the years American women jockeys have proven their ability. Julie Krone's 3,704 victories is the most by an American woman and As of June 2012, at least nineteen others have each ridden more than 1,000 winners.

For the most part Canada has generally followed the lead of the U.S. in opportunities for women riders. Canada has far fewer tracks than the U.S. and to date Canada has only two female jockeys with 1,000 wins. However, in both actual and relative numbers as well as overall success rate, Canada has surpassed its southern neighbor in opportunities for women at the highest level; their respective Triple Crown series: Starting with Joan Phipps in the 1973 Breeders' Stakes, 10 different women have competed in 30 Canadian Triple Crown races, with a combined 2 wins, 3 places, 4 shows. Moreover, while no US Triple Crown race has ever featured more than one female rider, that feat has occurred on 10 occasions in Canada, and 3 different women—Francine Villeneuve, Chantal Sutherland and Emma-Jayne Wilson—have raced in all three Canadian races. Sutherland has done it twice over and Wilson thrice over.

By comparison, since Diane Crump rode in the 1970 Kentucky Derby, six different women have competed in U.S. Triple Crown events, some multiple times: 10 times in the Derby, four times in the Preakness and nine times in the Belmont. with a combined record of one win, one place, one show. Julie Krone is the only woman to have won a US Triple Crown race, on Colonial Affair in the 1993 Belmont. With appearances in the 2011 Kentucky Derby, the 2012 Belmont Stakes and the 2013 Preakness Stakes, Rosie Napravnik became the first woman to ride in all three of the U.S. Triple Crown races. In 2013, Napravnik also became the first woman to ride in all three US Triple Crown races in the same year, and is the only woman to have won the Kentucky Oaks, which she has won twice.

== African American jockeys ==
In the United States during the 1800s, most aspects of horse racing were primarily performed by enslaved African Americans, including grooms, trainers, and jockeys. It began with plantation owners who would bring their enslaved workers and their horses to other plantations and organize and bet on races.

When horse racing became more mainstream, enslaved and free black people were involved with horse racing though most were identified with grooming, feeding, backing, exercising, and other auxiliary chores connected with the sport. Then they would work their way up to trainers, and then become full-time racers. By the end of the 1800s, horse racing was almost exclusively run by African American jockeys. In the inaugural Kentucky Derby, 13 out of the 15 jockeys were Black. Historically, the three most successful Black jockeys are Isaac Murphy, Willie Simms, and Jimmy Winkfield, with Murphy winning the Kentucky Derby in 1884, 1887, and 1890. He was the first Black jockey inducted into the National Museum Racing Hall of Fame. Jimmy Winkfield, the last Black jockey to win the Kentucky Derby, won back to back from 1901 to 1902.

According to Mooney, "Black jockeys won more than half of the first 25 runnings of the Kentucky Derby. After the abolition of slavery in 1865, African Americans were also stable managers, horse owners and breeders. By 1892, Blacks held more than one-third of the top jockey rankings in the US.

This dominance of the sport in North America by African Americans came to an abrupt stop in 1896 when Plessy v. Ferguson was decided, basically legalizing segregation. According to Rhoden, "owners and trainers stopped hiring them, White jockeys ganged up on them, and the Jockey Club systematically denied the reenlisting of Blacks". This led to the end of the supremacy of African American jockeys, which has never recovered. Until the Civil Rights movement of the 1950s and 1960s, African Americans were relegated to the lower roles of grooms, exercise riders, and other behind the scenes workers. According to Rockoff, "Black jockeys have been unable to approach the level of performance that had once been commonplace".

James Long was an African-American jockey who competed in over 4000 races 1976 to 2008. Of his 4,026 starts, he won 309 races and tallied up $2.7 million in career earnings. Long died in a car crash in 2017.

In 2000, Marlon St. Julien became the first Black jockey to race in the Kentucky Derby since 1921, snapping a 79-year absence of Black jockeys in the Derby.

Kendrick Carmouche is a Black jockey who has been racing since 2000. On April 5, 2025, Carmouche became the 69th jockey to ever amass over 4000 wins. In 2025, Carmouche was awarded the George Woolf Memorial Jockey Award. As of May 2026, he has won more than $174 million in career earnings.

As of 2016, Hispanic jockeys in the US became the top earners. In 2023, Silvio Gonzales says that "Eight of the top 10 jockeys in the world right now are Hispanic. The owners are Hispanic, the trainers are Hispanic. The exercise riders are Hispanic. You see them in every level of success."

== Robot jockeys ==
To replace child jockeys whose use had been deplored by human rights organizations, a camel race in Doha, Qatar, for the first time featured robots at the reins. On 13 July 2005, workers fixed robotic jockeys on the backs of seven camels and raced the machine-mounted animals around a track. Operators controlled the jockeys remotely, signalling them to pull their reins and prod the camels with whips.

== See also ==
- List of jockeys
- Disc jockey
- List of films about horse racing
- U.S. National Museum of Racing and Hall of Fame
- Thoroughbred horse racing
