= 1812 in sports =

1812 in sports describes the year's events in world sport.

== Boxing ==
Events

- Tom Cribb retains his English championship. His only known fight at this time is against "Symonds, the Jew" at Cripplegate in London.

== Cricket ==
Events

- Only one first-class match is recorded as the Napoleonic War takes its toll of cricket's manpower and investment.

England

- Most runs – Lord Frederick Beauclerk 87
- Most wickets – Thomas Howard 8

== Horse racing ==
England

- 2,000 Guineas Stakes – Cwrw
- The Derby – Octavius
- The Oaks – Manuella
- St. Leger Stakes – Otterington
