= Manuella =

British-bred Thoroughbred racehorse

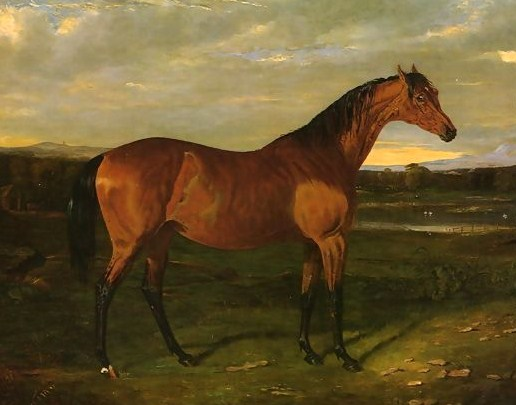
- Manuella by John Frederick Herring, Sr. (1795–1865)
- Sire: Dick Andrews
- Grandsire: Joe Andrews
- Dam: Mandane
- Damsire: Potoooooooo
- Sex: Mare
- Foaled: 1809
- Country: United Kingdom of Great Britain and Ireland
- Colour: Bay
- Breeder: Richard Watt
- Owner: W Hewett
- Trainer: William Peirse
- Record: 13: 3-5-1

Major wins
- Oaks Stakes (1812)

Manuella (1809 – after 1831) was a British Thoroughbred racehorse and broodmare who won the classic Oaks Stakes at Epsom Downs Racecourse in 1812. Unraced as a two-year-old, the Northern-trained filly was fancied to win The Derby on her racecourse debut but finished unplaced. She won the Oaks a day later, but was beaten when favourite for the St Leger Stakes. She won two more races (one of them a walkover) and changed hands more than once before being retired from racing at the end of the 1814 season. She was a successful and influential broodmare, whose direct descendants have won many important races.

== Background ==
Manuella was an "elegant" bay mare bred by Richard Watt of Bishop Burton in Yorkshire. She was sired by Dick Andrews, a grandson of Eclipse whose other progeny included the 2000 Guineas winner Cwrw, the St Leger Stakes winner Altisidora and the successful stallions Tramp and Muley Moloch. Her dam Mandane has been described as one of the best broodmares of the early 19th century and was also the dam of Altisidora, and the Chester Cup winner Brutandorf. She is regarded as the foundation mare of Thoroughbred family 11-g.

== Racing career ==
=== 1812: three-year-old season ===
Manuella made her first appearance in the Derby Stakes at Epsom on 14 May. Despite her lack of experience she had been heavily backed for the race: her owner, Mr Hewett had reportedly invested heavily in the filly's chances after the filly had performed impressively in trial gallops. Ridden by the leading jockey Sam Chifney, Jr. she was made 7/2 second favourite against twelve colts and one other filly. She "made but little running" and finished unplaced behind Octavius, Lord Egremont's unnamed Gohanna colt and the favourite Comus. There were rumours that Chifney had "pulled" Manuella (deliberately prevented her from winning) in order to ensure better odds for the Oaks on the following day. Manuella was largely ignored in the betting for the Oaks, starting a 20/1 outsider in a field of twelve fillies. Ridden by her trainer Billy Peirse, Manuella raced in second place before moving into the lead on the final turn. Peirse, riding with what was described as "uncommon judgement" eased the filly down early in the straight and allowed Chifney, on the Duke of Rutland's Elizabeth, the odds-on favourite, to move up alongside him. Manuella then pulled ahead again in the closing stages to win by three-quarters of a length.

Manuella did not run again until 21 September when she appeared in the St Leger Stakes at Doncaster Racecourse. She was made the 3/1 favourite in a field of twenty-four colts and fillies but finished unplaced behind Mr Robb's colt Otterington, a 50/1 outsider. Three days later, Manuella ran in a sweepstakes for three-year-old fillies over the same course and distance and "won easy" from Mother Bunch and Pope Joan. On 5 October, Manuella ended her season by walking over in a sweepstakes at Richmond when the other four horses entered for the race were withdrawn.

=== 1813: four-year-old season ===
Manuella failed to win in three races as a four-year-old. At Preston in Lancashire in July she finished fourth of the five runners in the Preston Gold Cup over four miles. On the following day she ran in a race run in a series of three-mile heats, with the prize going to the first horse to win twice. Manuella finished second to Lord Scarborough's colt Catton in the first heat and third to the same horse in the second. In October Manuella finished second to Mr Uppleby's mare Harriet in a King's Plate over four miles.

=== 1814: five-year-old season ===
Manuella failed to win in five starts at Newmarket Racecourse in 1814. On 12 April at the Craven meeting she contested the second class of the Oatlands Stakes, a handicap race over the two mile "Ditch-In" course. She carried a weight of 116 pounds and finished second of the six runners in a race won by Stanlake Batson's gelding Dorus. Before her next race, Manuella entered into the ownership of Lord Sackville. On 28 April she was beaten by Lord Foley's horse Offa's Dyke in a 200 guinea match over the Abington Mile course. At the next meeting on 11 May, Manuella was beaten by Lord George Cavendish's Gaber in a 100 guinea match. At the July meeting, the mare started odds-on favourite for a ten furlong sweepstakes but finished third of the four runners behind Cat, a black mare owned by Lord George Cavendish. Manuella's final start came in a five furlong handicap at the Houghton meeting on 2 November. Running in the ownership of Sir John Shelley she finished unplaced behind Mr Stonehewer's horse Hamlet.

== Stud record ==
Manuella returned to her breeder Richard Watt for her stud career. She produced sixteen foals between 1817 and 1831.

In 1822 Manuella produced a bay colt sired by the Derby winner Whisker. Named Memnon, he won the St Leger Stakes in 1825. Her next foal was a colt by Blacklock named Belzoni who won two Oatlands Stakes. In 1830, Manuella produced Belzoni's full brother Belshazzar, who had some success as a racehorse and sired the 1000 Guineas winner Cara.

Manuella's enduring influence on the Thoroughbred breed derives from her daughters. Margellina, a filly by Whisker was foaled in 1826. Margellina's descendants include War Admiral, Sun Cap (Epsom Oaks), Zeddaan (Poule d'Essai des Poulains), Enterprise (2000 Guineas), Eight Thirty and Stop The Music. Another daughter, Nitornis, also by Whisker, was the ancestor of Fisherman and the Belmont Stakes winner Joe Madden.

Manuella died shortly after foaling a colt named Belluno, by Blacklock in 1831.

== Pedigree ==
Pedigree of Manuella (GB), bay mare, 1809
Sire Dick Andrews (GB) 1797	Joe Andrews; 1778	Eclipse	Marske
Sire Dick Andrews (GB) 1797	Joe Andrews; 1778	Eclipse	Spilletta
Sire Dick Andrews (GB) 1797	Joe Andrews; 1778	Amaranda	Omnium
Sire Dick Andrews (GB) 1797	Joe Andrews; 1778	Amaranda	Cloudy
Sire Dick Andrews (GB) 1797	Highflyer mare 1790	Highflyer	Herod
Sire Dick Andrews (GB) 1797	Highflyer mare 1790	Highflyer	Rachel
Sire Dick Andrews (GB) 1797	Highflyer mare 1790	Cardinal Puff mare	Cardinal Puff
Sire Dick Andrews (GB) 1797	Highflyer mare 1790	Cardinal Puff mare	Tatler mare
Dam Mandane (GB) 1800	Potoooooooo; 1773	Eclipse	Marske
Dam Mandane (GB) 1800	Potoooooooo; 1773	Eclipse	Spilletta
Dam Mandane (GB) 1800	Potoooooooo; 1773	Sportsmistress	Sportsman
Dam Mandane (GB) 1800	Potoooooooo; 1773	Sportsmistress	Golden Locks
Dam Mandane (GB) 1800	Young Camilla; 1787	Woodpecker	Herod
Dam Mandane (GB) 1800	Young Camilla; 1787	Woodpecker	Miss Ramsden
Dam Mandane (GB) 1800	Young Camilla; 1787	Camilla	Trentham
Dam Mandane (GB) 1800	Young Camilla; 1787	Camilla	Coquette (Family 11-g)
