= Mundig =

British-bred Thoroughbred racehorse

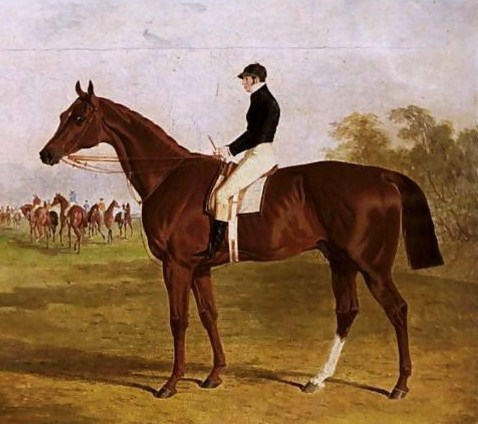
- Mundig and Bill Scott. Painting by John Frederick Herring Sr
- Sire: Catton
- Grandsire: Golumpus
- Dam: Emma
- Damsire: Whisker
- Sex: Stallion
- Foaled: 1832
- Country: United Kingdom of Great Britain and Ireland
- Colour: Chestnut
- Breeder: John Bowes
- Owner: John Bowes
- Trainer: John Scott
- Record: 10: 4-2-1

Major wins
- Epsom Derby (1835)

Mundig (1832–1852) was a British Thoroughbred racehorse and sire. In a career that lasted from May 1835 to October 1836 he ran ten times and won four races. In May 1835 he recorded his most important success on his racecourse debut when he won The Derby. Mundig was the first Derby winner to be trained in the North of England and the first of five trained at Malton, North Yorkshire by John Scott. Mundig was given a very hard race at Epsom and never reproduced his Derby-winning form: his subsequent successes came in relatively unimportant races. After his retirement he was exported to stand as a stallion in Prussia.

== Background ==
Mundig was a powerfully-built dark chestnut horse standing 15.3 hands high with a white star and a white sock on his hind leg. He was owned and bred by John Bowes at Streatlam Castle, County Durham. Bowes had inherited a large fortune when very young. In 1835, when Mundig was foaled, Bowes reached the age of twenty-one and gained full control of his property and wealth: "Mündig" is German for "of age", but the Germanic umlaut was not used in spelling the name. Bowes sent his colt into training with John Scott who trained forty classic winners at his base at Whitewall stables, Malton, North Yorkshire.

Mundig's dam was a mare named Emma, who went on to produce the 1843 Derby winner Cotherstone, and later gave birth to Mowerina, the dam of the Triple Crown winner West Australian. His sire Catton was a successful racehorse who once won fourteen races in succession. In addition to Mundig he sired the St Leger winner Tarrare and the stallion Mulatto.

== Racing career ==
=== 1835: three-year-old season ===
Mundig was unraced as a two-year-old, but his performances in home exercise gallops and private trial races made him a fancy for the Derby. He was the subject of heavy betting by the Scott family and by Bowes, although a great deal of secrecy surrounded his form, making him a very "dark horse". In April, Scott discovered that one of his stable lads had been passing information to bookmakers. Rather than expose and dismiss the lad, Scott fed him false information, to the effect that the colt would not run at Epsom. Mundig's odds lengthened and his connections were able to back him at 50/1.

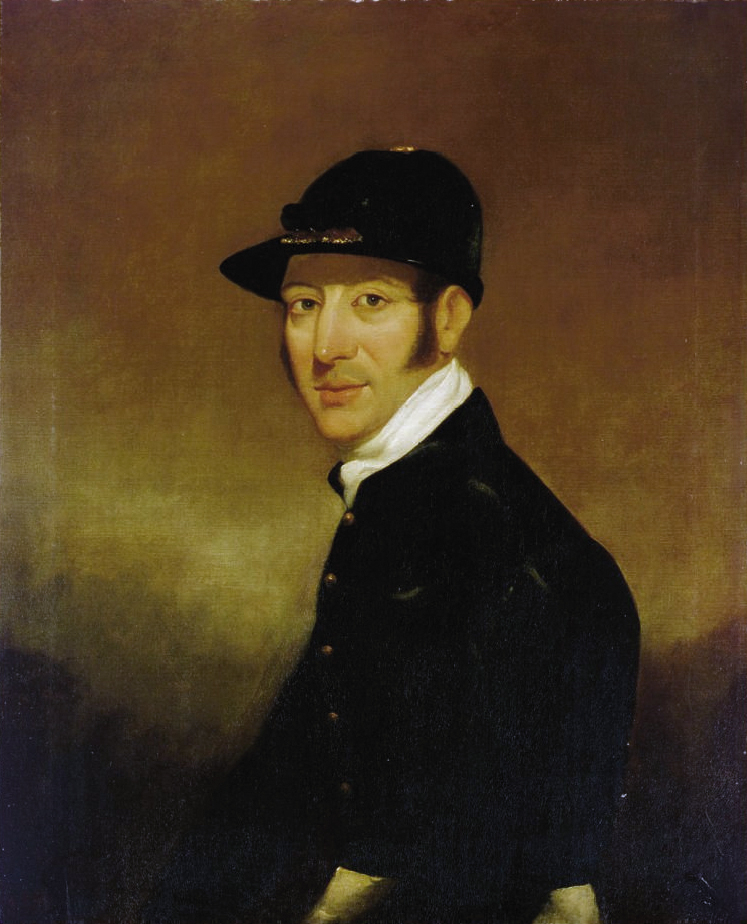
Bill Scott's riding of Mundig was harsh but effective.

Ridden by Bill Scott, the brother of his trainer, Mundig started at odds of 6/1 in a field of fourteen runners for the Derby on 3 June. Confusingly, there were two horses in the race called "Ibrahim", one of whom, a colt owned by Lord Jersey, started 7/4 favourite. Heavy rain had made the ground soft and muddy, but did not deter the usual huge crowds who were entertained between races by "conjurors, learned donkies, posture masters, Punchinellos &c". Several false starts saw the race beginning half an hour late, at a few minutes after three o’clock. Although the early pace was fast, almost all the leading contenders were still in contention as the field turned into the straight, and spread out across the width of the course. The closing stages saw four horses enter the final furlong almost level: Ascot and Lord Jersey's Ibrahim raced along the inside rail, while Mundig and the 100/1 outsider Pelops ran up the stands side. In an extremely close finish, Mundig was declared the winner by a neck from Ascot. The race was described as "one of the closest and best contested Derbys ever run". In addition to the winners prize of £3,550, Bowes and his associates were reported to have taken up to £20,000 in winning bets. Much credit for the win was given to Bill Scott, who rode a very strong finish, making extensive use of his whip and spurs. He had backed the colt heavily and was reported to have said on the eve of the race that he would win the Derby even if he had to "cut Mundig to pieces". According to the Court Journal, Mundig's win was greeted with great celebrations by his Northern supporters who waved impromptu flags and left the course crying "Yorkshire for ever! Mundig for ever!" Mail coaches passing through Yorkshire blew horns and flew flags in John Bowes black racing colour to mark Mundig's victory, leading one vicar to believe that the King must have died.

Following his very hard race at Epsom, Mundig did not appear again until 15 September when he ran in the Great St Leger at Doncaster before a large and fashionable crowd which included Princess Victoria. He was not considered a serious contender on the day of the race, with his stable companion Hornsea being regarded as Scott's main hope. He was towards the rear of the field throughout the race and finished ninth of the eleven runners behind Queen of Trumps. On the following day he started 4/6 favourite for the Foal Stakes over one and a half miles and won easily by three lengths, having led from the start against weak opposition.

=== 1836: four-year-old season ===
On his first appearance as a four-year-old, Mundig ran in the Tradesmen's Cup, a handicap race at Liverpool in July and finished unplaced behind Birdlime. Two days later at the same course he finished second to the five-year-old General Chasse, from whom he received thirteen pounds in the two mile Stand Cup. At York on 3 August he won a King's Plate over two miles, beating Wentworth, with General Chasse unplaced. In September, Mundig was sent to Doncaster, where he finished second to the three-year-old Venison ("a first-rate nag") in a four-mile King's Plate. He then finished fifth of nine runners in the Gold Cup at Heaton Park, Manchester on 30 September. This appears to have been a most unusual event, with Mundig carrying 169 pounds and no horse carrying less than 136. Mundig's last two starts came at the October meeting at Nottingham. On Wednesday 12 October he finished third to Sylvan in the Cup and two days later he ran against the same horse in the two mile King's Plate. The race was decided by the first horse to win two heats. Mundig won the first heat, but appeared to have been beaten in the second by Sylvan. The judge however awarded the heat and the race to Mundig, to the astonishment of the spectators.

== Assessment ==
Mundig was regarded as a useful but unexceptional horse whose form was "in no wise to be depended on." "The Druid" (W. H. Dixon) described him as "a very moderate horse". The Sportsman magazine took a different view, describing Mundig as essentially "true as steel", but ruined as a racehorse by his excessively hard race in the Derby.

There were persistent rumours in this period of four-year-old "ringers" being entered in the Derby, which is a race restricted to three-year-olds. The "winner" of the 1844 Derby was disqualified on these grounds and there were doubts about Bloomsbury and Little Wonder. Several later sources claim that Mundig, an unusually well-developed colt who arrived at Epsom surrounded in secrecy, may have been a four-year-old, the suggestion being that Emma's 1832 foal had been switched with his 1831 sibling.

== Stud career ==
Following his retirement from racing Mundig stood as a stallion, with his stud fee in 1839 being 10 guineas. He reportedly became a very difficult and dangerous horse during his time at stud and was responsible for at least one death. Mundig's early progeny were disappointing runners and in 1843 he was sold for 400 guineas to Captain von Kotze, a Prussian breeder. He was exported and stood from 1844 to 1848 as a stallion at the Hauptgestüt Trakehnen stud in Germany. Mundig was then sold to another German breeder called van Saucken and died in 1852. One of his British foals, The Grey Prince was standing as a stallion at Badminton in 1865 as a sire of hunters.

== Pedigree ==
Pedigree of Mundig (GB), chestnut stallion, 1832
Sire Catton (GB) 1809	Golumpus; 1802	Gohanna	Mercury*
Sire Catton (GB) 1809	Golumpus; 1802	Gohanna	Dundas’ Herod mare
Sire Catton (GB) 1809	Golumpus; 1802	Catherine	Woodpecker
Sire Catton (GB) 1809	Golumpus; 1802	Catherine	Camilla
Sire Catton (GB) 1809	Lucy Gray; 1804	Timothy	Delpini
Sire Catton (GB) 1809	Lucy Gray; 1804	Timothy	Cora
Sire Catton (GB) 1809	Lucy Gray; 1804	Lucy	Florizel
Sire Catton (GB) 1809	Lucy Gray; 1804	Lucy	Frenzy
Dam Emma (GB) 1824	Whisker; 1812	Waxy	Potoooooooo
Dam Emma (GB) 1824	Whisker; 1812	Waxy	Maria
Dam Emma (GB) 1824	Whisker; 1812	Penelope	Trumpator
Dam Emma (GB) 1824	Whisker; 1812	Penelope	Prunella
Dam Emma (GB) 1824	Gibside Fairy; 1811	Hermes	Mercury*
Dam Emma (GB) 1824	Gibside Fairy; 1811	Hermes	Rosina
Dam Emma (GB) 1824	Gibside Fairy; 1811	Vicissitude	Pipator
Dam Emma (GB) 1824	Gibside Fairy; 1811	Vicissitude	Beatrice (Family: 7-a)

* Mundig is inbred 4S x 4D to the stallion Mercury, meaning that he appears fourth generation on the sire side of his pedigree and fourth generation on the dam side of his pedigree.
