= Altisidora =

British-bred Thoroughbred racehorse

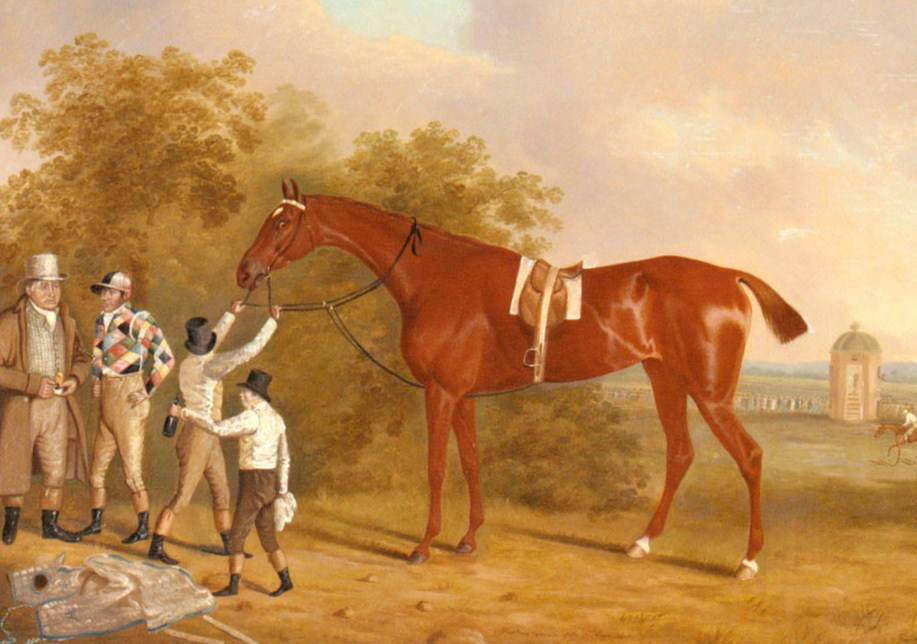
- Mr. Watt's Altisidora, Winner of the 1813 St. Leger by Clifton Tomson
- Sire: Dick Andrews
- Grandsire: Joe Andrews
- Dam: Mandane
- Damsire: Potoooooooo
- Sex: Mare
- Foaled: 1810
- Country: United Kingdom
- Colour: Chestnut
- Breeder: Richard Watt
- Owner: Richard Watt
- Trainer: Tommy Sykes
- Record: 19: 13-3-2

Major wins
- St Leger Stakes (1813); Match against Camelopard (1814); Doncaster Club Stakes (1814); Great Subscription Purse (1815); Fitzwilliam Stakes (1815); King's Plate at Richmond (1815)

Altisidora (1810–1825) was a British Thoroughbred racehorse and broodmare best known for winning the classic St Leger Stakes in 1813. Bred, trained and raced in Yorkshire she won two of her three races as a two-year-old in 1812. She was unbeaten for the next two seasons, winning three races including the St Leger at Doncaster as a three-year-old and four as a four-year-old in 1814. In her final season she won four of her eight races including a Great Subscription Purse at York, the Fitzwilliam Stakes at Doncaster and a King's Plate at Richmond. She was retired to stud, where she had some impact, being the grand-dam of Ralph, the winner 2000 Guineas and the Ascot Gold Cup. Altisidora died in 1825 at the age of fifteen.

== Background ==
Altisidora was a chestnut mare with a white star and two white feet bred by Richard Watt of Bishop Burton in Yorkshire. She was sired by Dick Andrews, a grandson of Eclipse whose other progeny included the 2000 Guineas winner Cwrw, the Oaks Stakes winner Manuella and the successful stallions Tramp and Muley Moloch. Her dam Mandane has been described as one of the best broodmares of the early 19th century and was also the dam of Manuella, and the Chester Cup winner Brutandorf. Mandane is regarded as the foundation mare of Thoroughbred family 11-g. Altisidora was trained throughout her racing career by Tommy Sykes and ridden in most of her races by John Jackson.

== Racing career ==
=== 1812: two-year-old season ===
Altisidora made he first appearance on 8 April 1812 at Malton Racecourse. She started the 8/13 favourite for a half mile sweepstakes and won from two opponents. On 27 May at York Racecourse, the filly started favourite for a sweepstakes and defeated Mr Garforth's unnamed grey colt and three others. On her third and final appearance as a two-year-old, Altisidora started 2/5 favourite for a sweepstakes at York on 25 August and finished third to Mr Garforth's colt. During the season, Watt reportedly turned down an offer of 1500 guineas for the filly.

=== 1813: three-year-old season ===
Altisidora began her 1813 season at York on 25 May. She started favourite for a one and a half mile sweepstakes for three-year-old fillies and "won easy" from the Duke of Leeds chestnut filly by Selim.

The filly was rested for five months before running in the St Leger at Doncaster on 27 September. Ridden by John Jackson she started the 5/2 favourite in a field of seventeen runners. Altisidora won the classic by a head from Lord Fitzwilliam's colt Camelopard with Tiger in third. Two days later, Altisidora contested a sweepstakes over the St Leger course and defeated five opponents at odds of 1/4.

=== 1814: four-year-old season ===
As a five-year-old in 1814, Altisidora was unbeaten in four races. At York in August she defeated Camelopard at level weights in a two-mile match race, earning 500 guineas for her owner. Over the same course on the following afternoon she won a sweepstakes in which she defeated Lord Scarborough's five-year-old Catton at weight-for-age.

In autumn, Altisidora returned to the Doncaster St Leger meeting, where she had two engagements on 29 September. She was able to claim the Doncaster Club Stakes without having to race as the other runners were withdrawn, allowing the filly to walk over. Later that afternoon she defeated Camelopard again in a four-mile sweepstakes in which she received four pounds from the colt.

=== 1815: five-year-old season ===
Altisidora did not appear as a five-year-old until 21 August at York when she contested a subscription race over two miles. She started odds-on favourite but suffered her first defeat for three years as she was beaten into second place by Catton. Two days later she ran in the second of the three Great Subscription Purse races and "won easy" from Hocuspocus and Kexby. The third and final of the Great Subscription Purse races was held the following afternoon with Catton her only opponent. On this occasion the colt started favourite and repeated his earlier victory over the filly.

In September, Altisidora ran for the third year in succession at the St Leger meeting and contested four races. On the opening day she won the one and a half mile Fitzwilliam Stakes, beating seven opponents at odds of 4/6. Two days later she received seven pounds from Catton in the Doncaster Stakes, but again finished second to Lord Scarborough's horse. On the following afternoon she finished last of the three runners behind the three-year-old St Leger winner Filho da Puta in the Doncaster Club Stakes over two miles and then immediately reappeared to beat two opponents in a four-mile sweepstakes.

Altisidora ended her racing career at Richmond Racecourse on 11 October. She won a King's Plate over four miles and then turned out again for the Richmond Gold Cup over the same course and distance. The mare ran unplaced for the first time as she finished seventh of the ten runners behind Filho da Puta and Doctor Syntax.

== Stud career ==
Altisidora was retired from racing to become a broodmare for Richard Watt's stud at Bishop Burton. She produced eight foals in eight years:

- Caesar, 1817, chestnut colt sired by Cerberus
- Catiline, 1818, chestnut colt by Cerberus
- 1819, chestnut filly by Rubens
- Abron, 1820, bay colt by Whisker
- 1821, chestnut filly by Blacklock, killed by lightning in 1838
- Worthless, 1822, bay filly by Walton
- 1823, chestnut filly by Catton, dam of the 2000 Guineas winner Ralph
- 1824, chestnut colt by Magistrate

Altisidora died at Bishop Burton on 25 January 1825.

== Honours ==
One of Bishop Burton's Public Houses was renamed The Altisidora in honour of the local mare, and has retained the name to the present day.

== Pedigree ==
Pedigree of Altisidora (GB), bay mare, 1810
Sire Dick Andrews (GB) 1797	Joe Andrews; 1778	Eclipse	Marske
Sire Dick Andrews (GB) 1797	Joe Andrews; 1778	Eclipse	Spilletta
Sire Dick Andrews (GB) 1797	Joe Andrews; 1778	Amaranda	Omnium
Sire Dick Andrews (GB) 1797	Joe Andrews; 1778	Amaranda	Cloudy
Sire Dick Andrews (GB) 1797	Highflyer mare 1790	Highflyer	Herod
Sire Dick Andrews (GB) 1797	Highflyer mare 1790	Highflyer	Rachel
Sire Dick Andrews (GB) 1797	Highflyer mare 1790	Cardinal Puff mare	Cardinal Puff
Sire Dick Andrews (GB) 1797	Highflyer mare 1790	Cardinal Puff mare	Tatler mare
Dam Mandane (GB) 1800	Potoooooooo; 1773	Eclipse	Marske
Dam Mandane (GB) 1800	Potoooooooo; 1773	Eclipse	Spilletta
Dam Mandane (GB) 1800	Potoooooooo; 1773	Sportsmistress	Sportsman
Dam Mandane (GB) 1800	Potoooooooo; 1773	Sportsmistress	Golden Locks
Dam Mandane (GB) 1800	Young Camilla; 1787	Woodpecker	Herod
Dam Mandane (GB) 1800	Young Camilla; 1787	Woodpecker	Miss Ramsden
Dam Mandane (GB) 1800	Young Camilla; 1787	Camilla	Trentham
Dam Mandane (GB) 1800	Young Camilla; 1787	Camilla	Coquette (Family 11-g)
