= John Forth =

British jockey and racehorse trainer

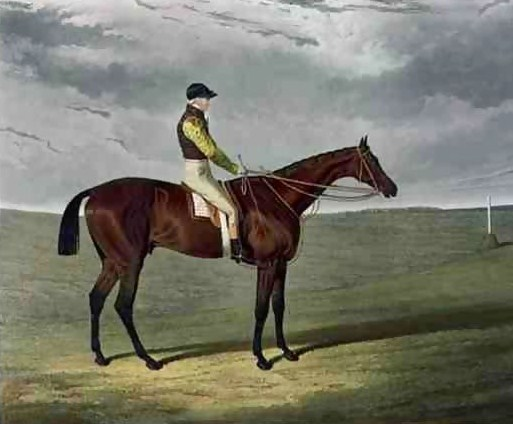
- Frederick, with (presumed) John Forth on board. Painting by John Frederick Herring Sr. (1795-1865)

Personal information
- Born: c. 1769
- Died: 4 February 1848 Oxford Street, London
- Resting place: St. Martin's Churchyard, Epsom
- Occupation: Jockey

Horse racing career
- Sport: Horse racing

Major racing wins
- Major races (as jockey); Epsom Derby (1829); Major races (as trainer); Epsom Derby (1829, 1840, 1845)

Significant horses
- Frederick, Little Wonder, The Merry Monarch

John Forth (c. 1769 – 4 February 1848) was a British jockey and racehorse trainer. He is the oldest man to have ridden the Derby winner and one of the very few to have both ridden and trained the winner.

== Career ==
Forth rose to prominence in the horseracing world late in life. There is no record of him having any major race victories as a young man, either as jockey or trainer. The peak of his career came only in 1829 when, aged 60, he performed the remarkable feat of both riding and training the Derby winner. As far as records are known, this also makes him the oldest jockey to win the Derby.

A year prior, he had placed a bet with a bookmaker named Crockford that he would win the race on a horse, The Exquisite, which he trained and planned to ride. Over the winter, however, he decided that Frederick, another horse in his stable, would be a more likely winner. He therefore asked Crockford to change his bet, and the bookmaker consented, considering neither to have a chance. Frederick won at 40/1, while Forth's other horse, The Exquisite, ridden by Frank Buckle, finished second, beaten just a head, at 50/1.

Forth would train a second winner of the Derby in 1840 – Little Wonder for David Robertson, 1st Baron Marjoribanks.

Forth later became embroiled in a Derby scandal when Leander, owned by a German horse-dealer friend of his, broke its leg and died running in the 1844 Derby. Accusations were made that Leander was a four-year-old and therefore ineligible for the race (the Derby being a race for three-year-olds). To settle the matter, the horse was disinterred to check its mouth, as a way of telling its correct age. On exhumation, however, the horse's lower jaw was found to be missing, Forth having removed it earlier to protect his friend.

The following year's Derby would be happier for Forth, recording a third win as a trainer with The Merry Monarch, ridden by Foster Bell. Both Forth's Derby winners were owned by G. William Gratwicke of Angmering, Sussex, heir to a fortune. Gratwicke had Frederick buried on his estate, under what is now the 18th green of Ham Manor golf course.

== Personal life ==
Forth married Hannah Townsend (died 1825). They had at least one son, H. T. Forth (died 1852) and one daughter (1797–1830). He died on 4 February 1848 at Oxford Street in London, after a long illness, and was buried in St. Martin's Churchyard, Epsom.

== Major wins (as jockey) ==
(United Kingdom) Great Britain

- Epsom Derby – Frederick (1829)

== Major wins (as trainer) ==
(United Kingdom) Great Britain

- Epsom Derby – Frederick (1829), The Merry Monarch (1845)

== Bibliography ==
- Mortimer, Roger; Onslow, Richard; Willett, Peter (1978). Biographical Encyclopaedia of British Racing. London: Macdonald and Jane's. ISBN 0-354-08536-0.
- Wright, Howard (1986). The Encyclopaedia of Flat Racing. London: Robert Hale. ISBN 0-7090-2639-0.
