= Merry Monarch =

Merry or Merrie Monarch may refer to:

- Charles II of England (1630–1685), king of Great Britain and Ireland
- Kalākaua (1836–1891), king of Hawaii
  - Merrie Monarch Festival, festival in Hilo named after him
- The Merry Monarch, racehorse
- The Merry Monarch (musical), an 1890 comic opera
