= Cwrw =

British-bred Thoroughbred racehorse

- Sire: Dick Andrews
- Grandsire: Joe Andrews
- Dam: Lady Charlotte
- Damsire: Buzzard
- Sex: Stallion
- Foaled: 1809
- Country: United Kingdom
- Colour: Brown
- Breeder: 3rd Earl of Darlington
- Owner: 3rd Earl of Darlington; J C Villiers; A Bacon; E Gould
- Record: 26: 6-10-3

Major wins
- 2000 Guineas (1812); Match against Hydaspes (1813)

Cwrw (foaled 1809) was a British Thoroughbred racehorse and sire and best known for winning the classic 2000 Guineas in 1812. In a racing career which lasted from April 1812 until September 1816 he won six of his twenty-six races. He won the 2000 Guineas on his racing debut in a race which led indirectly to a change in the betting rules in the United Kingdom. Cwrw won his two other races in 1812, but the rest of his career was relatively undistinguished. He passed through the hands of various owners winning once in 1813, once in 1814 and once in 1816. He was retired from racing and exported to stand as a breeding stallion in South Africa. Cwrw is the Welsh word for beer.

== Background ==
Cwrw was a brown horse bred by his owner William Vane, 3rd Earl of Darlington, later the 1st Duke of Cleveland. He was the fourth of eleven foals produced by Lady Charlotte (1799-1818) a mare bred by Mr. Wilkinson. Lady Charlotte was a half-sister of the St Leger Stakes winner Paragon and the successful breeding stallion Whiskey.

He was sired by Dick Andrews, a grandson of Eclipse whose other progeny included the Oaks winner Manuella, the St Leger Stakes winner Altisidora and the successful stallions Tramp and Muley Moloch.

== Racing career ==
=== 1812: three-year-old season ===
Until 1913, there was no requirement for British racehorses to have official names, and the horse who later became known as Cwrw began his racing career as Lord Darlingtons's br. c. by Dick Andrews out of a sister to Kite, by Buzzard . Lord Darlington's colt made his first appearance on 14 April 1812 when he was one of seven three-year-olds, from an original entry of twenty-four, to contest the fourth running of the 2000 Guineas Stakes over the Rowley Mile course. Ridden by Sam Chifney, he won by a neck from Lord Stawell's colt Cato. According to later writers, the 2000 Guineas of 1812 was the subject of a major betting coup. Before the race, a huge amount of money was wagered on Lord Darlington's other runner, an unnamed colt sired by Remembrancer which caused the odds of the other runners to lengthen. Shortly before the race, the impression that the Remebrancer colt was his owner's favoured entrant was enhanced when he appeared before the crowds ridden by Chifney, while Cwrw was ridden by an unknown stable lad. When the horses arrived at the start, however, Chifney swapped mounts and the Remembrancer colt was withdrawn. Darlington and his confederates collected on their winning bets, and, under the betting rules then in force, were able to recoup their losing bets on the Remembrancer colt, which were declared void. The incident led to the extension of "Play-or-Pay" betting, in which bets on withdrawn horses counted as losing bets, in most major races.

Thirteen days later, now officially named Cwrw, Lord Darlington's colt started 5/6 favourite for a sweepstakes over the Abington Mile and won "cleverly" from two opponents. On the following afternoon Cwrw started favourite for a £50 race for three-year-olds and won from Mr Craven's colt Tooley and seven others. Cwrw did not race again in 1812: he was entered in the Garden Stakes in October but was withdrawn from the race.

=== 1813: four-year-old season ===
After a break of almost eleven months, Cwrw made his debut as a four-year-old on 4 May. He started joint-favourite for the Claret Stakes over the two-mile Ditch-In course, but finished third behind Comus and Cato. At the next meeting two weeks later he was beaten in a 300 guinea match race over the Rowley Mile by Lord Foley's colt Benedick. Cwrw was off the course for six months before reappearing at the Houghton meeting on 1 November. He was pitted against Mr Shakespear's horse Hydaspes in a match over the Abington Mile in which he conceded seven pounds to his opponent. Cwrw started at odds of 1/10 and won the match to claim a prize of 200 guineas. Later at the same meeting he was withdrawn from a match against Lord George Cavendish's horse Eccleston, with Lord Darlington paying a forfeit of 100 guineas.

=== 1814: five-year-old season ===
Cwrw began his 1814 campaign by running unplaced behind Slender Billy in the Craven Stakes at Newmarket on 11 April. At the next meeting two weeks later he was beaten by Lord Foley's horse Offa's Dyke in a match race over the Abington Mile. On 10 May at the Second Spring meeting Cwrw started favourite for a ten furlong handicap for which he was assigned top weight of 120 pounds. He ran a dead heat with Lord George Cavendish's mare Cat, and won a deciding heat to take the prize. At the July meeting he finished unplaced behind Mr Vansittart's unnamed grey colt in a £50 race over the Abington Mile. After this race Cwrw entered the ownership of the Hon J C Villiers.

=== 1815: six-year-old season ===
In early 1815, Villiers was able to claim two prizes without having to race his new acquisition. Mr Prince had to pay 100 guineas forfeit when his horse Young Eagle failed to appear for a match against Cwrw at the Craven meeting and Mr Scott Stonehewer paid 100 guineas when Slender Billy did not oppose Cwrw in a match over the Ditch Mile on 27 April. Cwrw failed to win in his eight competitive races in 1815. At the Second Spring meeting he finished fourth behind Slender Billy in a handicap race over the four Beacon Course and was beaten in a match by Mr Bouverie's mare Scheherazade. At the July meeting Cwrw finished unplaced behind Alexander the Great in a two-mile sweepstakes.

Cwrw returned to action in autumn when he was beaten again by Scheherazade in a one-mile match race on 4 October. At the Second October meeting two weeks later, Cwrw finished second to Idle Boy in a subscription race over the Beacon Course and in the Town Plate three days later. At the Houghton meeting, Cwrw finished unplaced in two five furlong handicap races.

=== 1816: seven-year-old season ===
Cwrw began his final season by racing three times at Newmarket in spring. He finished second to Asmodeus in a subscription race at the Craven meeting, ran unplaced behind Sir Thomas in a five furlong race at the First Spring meeting and finished third to Equator in a ten furlong handicap race at the Second Spring meeting. On 2 July a horse named Cwrw (described as a gelding owned by Mr Goodisson ran in a race at Ipswich. He finished second in the first heat, third in the second and was then withdrawn from the deciding heat. Cwrw's next engagements came at Brighton Racecourse in August. Running in the ownership of Mr Bacon he won a claiming race in two heats from Mr Gould's horse Gum Guaiacum. After the race he was claimed for 60 guineas by the owner of the runner-up. On the following day, running for Mr Gould, he was beaten in two races by Mr Maxse's horse Cashew. Cwrw ended his racing career at Enfield Racecourse on 11 September when he contested the Town Plate in a series of four mile heats. He won the first heat, finished second to Mr Kings's horse Grasshopper in the second and third to the same horse in the deciding heat.

== Stud career ==
According to the Racing Calendar, Cwrw was "sent to the Cape" at the end of the 1816 season, suggesting that he was exported to stand as a breeding stallion in British Cape Colony.

== Pedigree ==
Pedigree of Cwrw (GB), brown horse, 1809
Sire Dick Andrews (GB) 1797	Joe Andrews; 1778	Eclipse	Marske
Sire Dick Andrews (GB) 1797	Joe Andrews; 1778	Eclipse	Spilletta
Sire Dick Andrews (GB) 1797	Joe Andrews; 1778	Amaranda	Omnium
Sire Dick Andrews (GB) 1797	Joe Andrews; 1778	Amaranda	Cloudy
Sire Dick Andrews (GB) 1797	Highflyer mare 1790	Highflyer	Herod*
Sire Dick Andrews (GB) 1797	Highflyer mare 1790	Highflyer	Rachel
Sire Dick Andrews (GB) 1797	Highflyer mare 1790	Cardinal Puff mare	Cardinal Puff
Sire Dick Andrews (GB) 1797	Highflyer mare 1790	Cardinal Puff mare	Tatler mare
Dam Lady Charlotte (GB) 1799	Buzzard; 1787	Woodpecker	Herod*
Dam Lady Charlotte (GB) 1799	Buzzard; 1787	Woodpecker	Miss Ramsden
Dam Lady Charlotte (GB) 1799	Buzzard; 1787	Misfortune	Dux
Dam Lady Charlotte (GB) 1799	Buzzard; 1787	Misfortune	Curiosity
Dam Lady Charlotte (GB) 1799	Clash; 1775	Herod*	Tartar
Dam Lady Charlotte (GB) 1799	Clash; 1775	Herod*	Cypron
Dam Lady Charlotte (GB) 1799	Clash; 1775	Teresa	Matchem
Dam Lady Charlotte (GB) 1799	Clash; 1775	Teresa	Brown Regulus (Family 2-a)

* Cwrw is inbred 4S x 4D x 3D to the stallion Herod, meaning that he appears fourth generation on the sire side of his pedigree and fourth and third generation on the dam side of his pedigree.
