= Robert Ridsdale =

British horse breeder (1783 - 1857)

Robert Ridsdale (1783–1857) was a wealthy English race horse breeder and gambler, whose horse St. Giles, owned in partnership with prize-fighter, John Gully, won The Derby in 1832. According to the Biographical Encyclopaedia of British Flat Racing "His methods were based on the corruption of trainers, jockey and stable employee and for some years he was a powerful influence for evil in the sport". His partnership with Gully ended on acrimonious and violent terms.

== Early life ==
Ridsdale came from humble beginnings, but stories about his early life vary; some say he was working in a Doncaster hotel as a boot-black and others that he was a groom in York. They all agree that he was offered a job in service by John George Lambton, who later became the 1st Earl of Durham. Ridsdale worked as a groom and became involved with Lambton's horse racing and gambling, getting to know jockeys, trainers and the betting market. His time with Lambton enabled him to develop the social skills of a gentlemen.

== Partnership with Gully ==
Ridsdale left the employment of Lambton, and operated on the fringes of the betting ring with some success. He became trusted as a betting man who would pay his debts promptly, and in full. He also began acting as an agent to gentlemen gamblers such as Robert Edward Petre, youngest son of Robert Petre, 9th Baron Petre. Others that worked in this way included the former prize-fighter John Gully. He, like Ridsdale, owned race-horses and in 1827, he purchased The Derby winner Mameluke and entered the horse into the St Leger Stakes. The race was chaotic with several false starts and the eventual winner, Matilda, owned by Robert Edward Petre, beat Gully's horse by a length. Many believed the race had been fixed by Ridsdale and others.

A similar race fixing scandal had surrounded the running of the 1824 St. Leger, when before the race Ridsdale was seen having a clandestine meeting with the jockey of the favourite horse, Jerry. This coincided with an inexplicable change in the betting market and the trainer, fearing the worst, switched jockeys at the last moment. The betting market immediately responded with money going back on Jerry, which seemed to confirm that a "fix" had been planned. The horse went on to win the race.

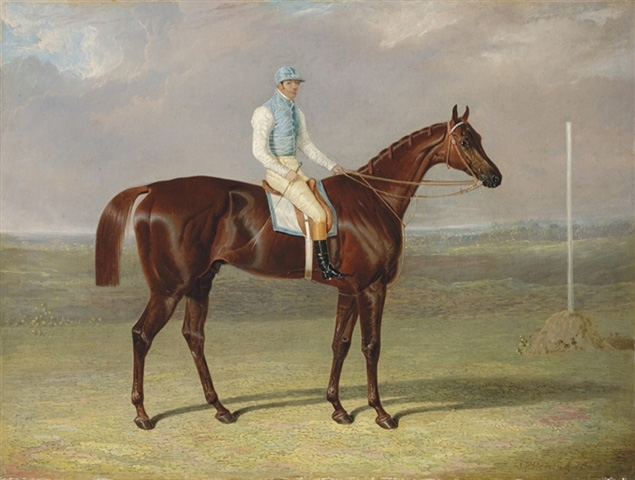
St. Giles 1832 Epsom Derby winner

Ridsdale and John Gully formed a partnership in about 1829/30. Probably their biggest coups came in the 1832, Derby and St Leger. At this time, due to the problem of transporting horses over long distances, there was a north–south divide in the sport. Ridsdale was based in Yorkshire and for a horse trained there to get to Epsom for the Derby required the animal to be walked for over 200 miles. His horse St. Giles (owned in partnership with Gully) was trained at Newmarket as was a horse owned by Gully called Margrave. These were both entered for the Derby and the race, run in controversial circumstances, went to St. Giles, winning in the process very large sums of money for the connections. It was believed that Ridsdale made £40,000. After the race there were further objections about the identity of the horse, its actual age and the registration details, however, the result stood.

The St. Leger of that year was won by Gully's horse Margrave, and again he and his partner Ridsdale won large sums of money on the result. However, on this occasion there was a dispute between the two men. Ridsdale said in public that Gully had taken £12,000 from the result and this angered Gully who said he had £1200 from the result. The dispute came to a head during a hunt when the two men were on horseback. Ridsdale was in discussion with fellow huntsmen when Gully approached and asked Ridsdale to confirm what he had been saying about the money. This he did, at which point Gully called him a scoundrel and struck him a blow across his back with his stick before riding off. Although Ridsdale was not physically harmed he prosecuted Gully and was awarded £500.

== Challenged to a duel ==
This was not the first time that Ridsdale had taken such a dispute to the courts. In 1829, he met army captain John Wilson in York, and accused him of addressing improper language to a lady in his protection. The lady in question was described later in court as "of great personal attraction" and living with Ridsdale "without having performed the usual ceremony of marriage". Captain Wilson gave his word to Ridsdale, as an officer and gentleman of 25 years service, that he had not addressed the lady and did not even know her. Ridsdale refused to believe him and this angered Wilson, who visited a local gunsmith where he procured a matched pair of pistols with ammunition. These he took to Ridsdale's home where he challenged him to a duel. Ridsdale refused to fight and took the matter to court. Duelling was against the law and the jury found Captain Wilson guilty. The judge considered that Ridsdale had been unwise not to believe Wilson, who had given his word as an officer and gentleman, so imposed a small fine of £5, which was paid immediately by Wilson.

== The Murton stud ==
In the late 1820s Ridsdale took residence in a village on the outskirts of York called Murton. He created a stud farm of over 320 acres with stabling, loose boxes, blacksmiths shop, shoeing shed, saddle rooms, coach house, granaries, barns and staff accommodation. He was also able to grow his own crops for horse feed. John Scott's Whitewall training establishment in Malton was about 18 miles distance from the Murton stud and he became Ridsdales trainer. The costs involved, plus Ridsdale life styles and his run of bad luck (or bad judgement) led to his eventual bankruptcy in 1836. His horses, equipment, land and buildings were auctioned off and Ridsdale slipped into obscurity.

One of the stallions at Ridsdale's stud had been Tramp, purchased in 1830 from Frederick Lumley Savile, of Tickhill Castle. Tramp had been the sire of Ridsdale's Derby winner, St. Giles who was out of the dam Arcot Lass. In 1835 Tramp was gifted away by Ridsdale (due to the animal's failing health) and replaced by Lord Fitzwilliam's Mulatto. One of the horses that Mulatto served was Arcot Lass (owner by Mr Cattle) and the resulting foal was Bloomsbury, who became the 1837 Derby winner. Controversy surrounded the animal's progeny because the stud book registration said that the sire had been Tramp or Mulatto, whereas another registration said that the sire was just Mulatto. After Bloomsbury won the Derby the owner of the second placed horse lodged a protest due to these discrepancies, but this was overruled and the result stood. The matter was then taken to court and several witnesses were called to testify that Tramp could not have been the sire. The jury found for the owner of Bloomsbury, who by this time was Ridsdale's brother William.

== Final years ==
It appears that Ridsdale had only one child, who was named Robert Ridsdale Jun. Sadly in 1835, at the age of 17 the lad was killed in a shooting accident when the trigger on his gun becoming snagged on a branch; this event happened just months before Ridsdale's bankruptcy. His wife, Sophia, died in Doncaster in 1846 and Ridsdale died in Newmarket in October 1856. The newspaper reports immediately after his death said that he died in his lodgings after dining out with friends, however, nearly all stories about him since have said he was found dead in a stable with only three coins in his pocket.
