= Foster Bell =

British jockey

Personal information
- Born: 1814
- Died: 1857 (aged 42–43)
- Occupation: Jockey

Horse racing career
- Sport: Horse racing

Major racing wins
- Major races Epsom Derby (1845)

Significant horses
- The Merry Monarch

Foster Bell (1814–1857) was a British jockey who most notably won the 1845 Epsom Derby on The Merry Monarch.

Bell was little known before his Derby win, and is considered to have been a lucky winner of the race, winning by a length on the 40/1 outsider in an incident-packed race. It would be the only win of the horse's career. He lost at Goodwood on 30 July and again when well beaten at evens for the Gatwick Stakes with Bell riding.

His younger brother, Henry, was also a successful jockey.

He died, aged 43, 16 days after having a fall at Chatham races on 27 September 1857, when trying to avoid a spectator.

== Major wins ==
(United Kingdom) Great Britain

- Epsom Derby – The Merry Monarch (1845)
