= Sim Templeman =

British jockey

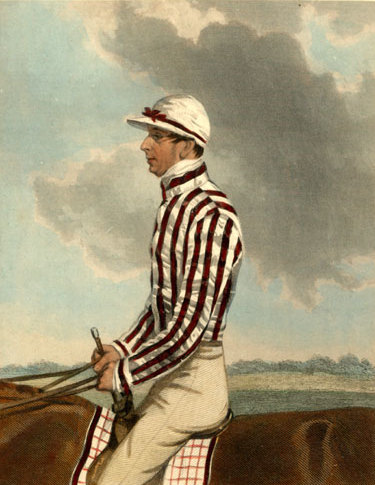
- Painting of Sim Templeman astride a horse

Personal information
- Born: 1805 Everingham, Yorkshire
- Died: 1884 (aged 78–79) York
- Occupation: Jockey

Horse racing career
- Sport: Horse racing

Major racing wins
- Major races Epsom Derby (1839, 1847, 1848); Epsom Oaks (1847, 1848, 1855); St Leger (1851)

Significant horses
- Bloomsbury, Cossack, Cymba, Marchioness, Miami, Newminster, Surplice

Simeon Templeman (1805–1884) was a British classic-winning jockey. He won seven classic races in total, including the Epsom classic double twice.

== Career ==
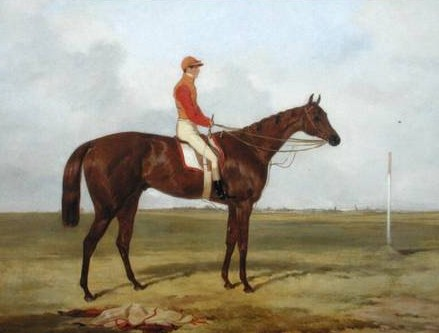
Cossack, 1847 Epsom Derby winner, with jockey Sim Templeman. Painting by Harry Hall (1814–1882)

Templeman was born into a long-standing farming family in the village of Everingham in the East Riding of Yorkshire. His parents are variously reported as Charles John Templeman and Jane Templeman or Edward and Hannah Templeman. He was baptised on 13 July 1805 and had three younger brothers - Matthew, William and John. He started out riding for Malton-based trainer Tommy Sykes and his first ride came in 1819 at Malton Races on Unity, owned by a local doctor. However, he did not win his first race until 1821, when he won at Catterick. By 1833 he was riding for the Duke of Leeds and his reputation among northern jockeys was said to "stand high".

In 1839, he won his first Derby on Bloomsbury. The race was run in a snowstorm, Templeman making his move late and winning by a length at odds of 25/1. Some later believed the horse to have been a four-year-old, which would have made him ineligible for the race, although the objection was not upheld by the stewards. He won the race again twice more - on Cossack in 1847 and Surplice in 1848.

Other major races he won include three Oaks (completing Epsom doubles in 1847 and 1848), the 1851 St Leger on Newminster, and the first running of the Ebor Handicap in 1843 on Colonel Craddock's Pagan. He continued to ride until well over the age of 50.

== Riding style and character ==
Templeman is said to have been of "small and wiry stature" and had an odd riding style - riding with his legs out straight so his toes were in front of his horse's shoulders. He was not regarded to be in the highest class of jockeys. There was some suspicion as to his honesty, based upon the connections he worked with, but nothing was ever proved. Outside of racing, he was said to be "a brilliant rider to hounds, a crack shot and an excellent farmer."

== Personal life ==
Templeman married Sarah, a landlord's daughter, and they had three children. With his winnings, Templeman was able to build up a substantial portfolio of land and property, including Burnby House, near Pocklington, where he and his family lived. A house in Pocklington was named Bloomsbury after his Derby-winning horse.

Eventually, his son Edward Read Templeman took over the estate, allowing Templeman to retire to a terraced house in Heworth, York. He died aged 78, leaving a personal estate of £3,073 7s. 8d. and was buried in York Cemetery.

Simeon Jr. (born 1852) became a miller in Thorne.

Simeon Sr's brother John had two sons. The youngest, William, also became a jockey, as did his son Fred, who went on to win the Derby in 1919.

== Major wins ==
(United Kingdom) Great Britain

- Epsom Derby - (3) - Bloomsbury (1839), Cossack (1847), Surplice (1848)
- Epsom Oaks - (3) - Miami (1847), Cymba (1848), Marchioness (1855)
- St Leger - Newminster (1851)

== See also ==
- List of jockeys
- List of significant families in British horse racing

== Bibliography ==
- Mortimer, Roger; Onslow, Richard; Willett, Peter (1978). Biographical Encyclopaedia of British Racing. London: Macdonald and Jane's. ISBN 0-354-08536-0.
- Wright, Howard (1986). The Encyclopaedia of Flat Racing. London: Robert Hale. ISBN 0-7090-2639-0.
