= Otterington (horse) =

British-bred Thoroughbred racehorse

- Sire: Golumpus
- Grandsire: Gohanna
- Dam: Expectation mare
- Damsire: Expectation
- Sex: Stallion
- Foaled: 1809
- Country: United Kingdom
- Colour: Bay
- Owner: Ralph Rob; Mr Kirby; Mr Skeet
- Trainer: W. Hesseltine
- Record: 16: 2-6-2

Major wins
- St Leger Stakes (1812)

Otterington (also known as Ottrington, foaled 1809) was a British Thoroughbred racehorse best known for winning the classic St Leger Stakes in 1812. He was one of the least successful of classic winners, winning only one other race from sixteen starts between May 1812 and June 1815. His St Leger victory was the only one of his three-year-old season, and was achieved at odds of 50/1. He subsequently won one two-runner race in eight attempts in 1813 and after missing the whole of following season he was beaten in all four of his starts as a six-year-old. Otterington's fate after his retirement from racing is unknown.

== Background ==
Otterington was a bay horse owned for the early part of his racing career by drove business owner and farmer, Ralph Rob of Catton, Yorkshire. He was and sired by Golumpus, a son of Gohanna, whose best offspring was probably the Doncaster Cup winner Catton. Golumpus was unraced, and until the time of Otterington's success, had mainly been used as a sire of hunters and coach-horses. Otterington's dam, an unnamed mare sired by Expectation, later produced a filly by Orville who became a successful broodmare, being the ancestor of the St Leger winner Blue Bonnet. During his first season, the colt's name was usually spelled Ottrington.

== Racing career ==
=== 1812: three-year-old season ===
Otterington was unraced as a two-year-old and began his racing career at York Racecourse on 27 May. He started 2/1 second favourite in a field of five for a sweepstakes over one and three quarter mileas and finished third to Mr Brandling's unnamed bay colt. In the following month, Otterington was sent to Newcastle Racecourse in Northumberland where he had two races on 24 June. He was beaten by Mr Baker's bay colt by Emperor in a two mile sweepstakes and then turned out again immediately for the Silver Cup, a race run in a series of two and a quarter mile heats, with the prize going to the first horse to win twice. He finished third to Lord Strathmore's chestnut colt by Remembrancer in the first heat, and was withdrawn from the second, in which Lord Strathmore's colt completed his victory.

Otterington did not run again until the St Leger at Doncaster Racecourse on 21 September, where he started a 50/1 outsider in a field of twenty-four colts and fillies. The Oaks winner Manuella was made 3/1 favourite ahead of Catton on 9/2. Early in the straight Ottrington, ridden by Robert Johnson, emerged to dispute the lead with Herrington and Lord Strathmore's brown colt by Remembrancer. The three colts engaged in a "very severe struggle" before Ottrington prevailed by half a head from the Strathmore colt, with Herrington a head away in third. It was the first of four St Leger wins for Johnson, who was described as a "remarkably bold and resolute" rider. After the race, Otterington's trainer W. Hesseltine turned down an offer of 1,600 guineas for the colt.

=== 1813: four-year-old season ===
At York in May, Otterington began his four-year-old season by finishing sixth when favourite for a two mile sweepstakes and then ran fourth in the Constitution Stakes two days later. At Newcastle in June he defeated the filly Agnes Sorrel by half a head in a "fine race" for a four mile sweepstakes to record his only success of the season, and then finished second when favourite for a King's Plate over the same course on the following day. Two months later at York, Otterington finished second to Catton in another King's Plate.

Otterington's next appearance was at Pontefract Racecourse in September, when he was beaten by the five-year-old Epperston, his only opponent in a four mile sweepstakes. Later that month, Otterington returned to Doncaster for the St Leger meeting, where he ran twice without success on the opening day, finishing fourth in the Fitzwilliam Stakes and last of the three runners in a King's Plate.

=== 1815: six-year-old season ===
Otterington missed the whole of the 1814 season before reappearing in the ownership of Mr Kirby as a six-year-old in 1815, when he was campaigned in the south of England. At Newmarket he finished second to Don Cossack in a King's Plate on 28 April and then finished unplaced when favourite for a ten furlong handicap race two weeks later. Otterington had passed into the ownership of Mr Skeet by the time of the Derby meeting at Epsom, where he was withdrawn after finishing second in the first heat of the Town Plate. Otterington ended his racing career at Ascot Racecourse on 6 June when he finished last of the five runners in a two and a half mile sweepstakes.

== Stud career ==
Otterington was listed for sale in January 1816 due to his owner moving abroad. He does not appear in any of the annual lists of stallions published in The Sporting Calendar and has no foals registered in the General Stud Book. He may have died of natural causes or been euthanised after his last race, although it is also possible that, like his sire, he was used to breed non-Thoroughbred stock.

== Pedigree ==
Pedigree of Otterington (GB), bay stallion, 1809
Sire Golumpus (GB) 1802	Gohanna; 1790	Mercury	Eclipse*
Sire Golumpus (GB) 1802	Gohanna; 1790	Mercury	Tartar mare
Sire Golumpus (GB) 1802	Gohanna; 1790	Dundas Herod mare	Herod*^
Sire Golumpus (GB) 1802	Gohanna; 1790	Dundas Herod mare	Maiden
Sire Golumpus (GB) 1802	Catherine; 1795	Woodpecker	Herod*^
Sire Golumpus (GB) 1802	Catherine; 1795	Woodpecker	Miss Ramsden
Sire Golumpus (GB) 1802	Catherine; 1795	Camilla	Trentham
Sire Golumpus (GB) 1802	Catherine; 1795	Camilla	Coquette
Dam Expectation mare (GB) 1805	Expectation; 1796	Sir Peter Teazle	Highflyer*^
Dam Expectation mare (GB) 1805	Expectation; 1796	Sir Peter Teazle	Papillon
Dam Expectation mare (GB) 1805	Expectation; 1796	Zilia	Eclipse*
Dam Expectation mare (GB) 1805	Expectation; 1796	Zilia	Jemima
Dam Expectation mare (GB) 1805	Calabria; 1795	Spadille	Highflyer*^
Dam Expectation mare (GB) 1805	Calabria; 1795	Spadille	Flora
Dam Expectation mare (GB) 1805	Calabria; 1795	Alfred mare	Alfred
Dam Expectation mare (GB) 1805	Calabria; 1795	Alfred mare	Locust mare (Family 20)

*^ Otterington is inbred 4S × 4S x 5D x 5D to the stallion Herod, meaning that he appears fourth generation twice on the sire side of his pedigree and fifth generation twice (via Highflyer)^ on the dam side of his pedigree.

* Otterington is inbred 4S × 4D to the stallion Eclipse, meaning that he appears fourth generation on the sire side of his pedigree and fourth generation on the dam side of his pedigree.

* Otterington is inbred 4D × 4D to the stallion Highflyer, meaning that he appears fourth generation twice on the dam side of his pedigree.
