= Frederick (horse) =

British-bred Thoroughbred racehorse

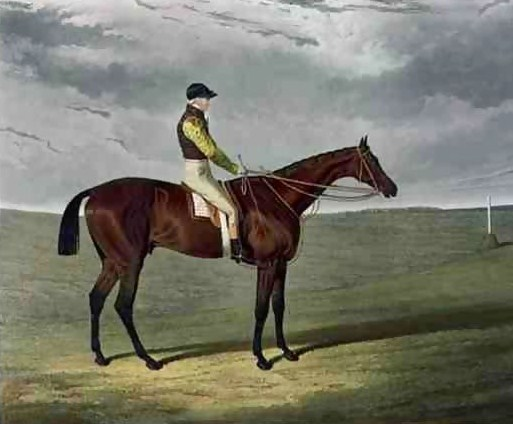
- Frederick and John Forth. Painting by John Frederick Herring, Sr.
- Sire: Little John
- Grandsire: Octavius
- Dam: Phantom mare
- Damsire: Phantom
- Sex: Stallion
- Foaled: 1826
- Country: United Kingdom of Great Britain and Ireland
- Colour: Bay
- Breeder: G. W. Gratwicke
- Owner: G. W. Gratwicke
- Trainer: John Forth
- Record: 5:1-0-1

Major wins
- Epsom Derby (1829)

Frederick (1826–1837) also known as "Frederic", was a British Thoroughbred racehorse and sire. In a career that lasted from June 1829 to August 1831 he ran five times and won once. His only win came on his racecourse debut, when he recorded an upset victory in the 1829 Derby ridden by his sixty-year-old trainer John Forth. Frederick failed to reproduce his Derby-winning form, finishing no better than third in four subsequent races.

== Background ==
Frederick was a bay horse bred by his owner, William Gratwicke of Ham Manor, near Angmering in Sussex. He was the one of several good horses produced by Gratwicke's unnamed Phantom mare, including The Margravine who in turn produced the 1845 Derby winner The Merry Monarch. The Phantom mare (sometimes referred to as Frederica) had been Gratwicke's first thoroughbred– he had bought her as a hunter– and Frederick was the second horse he bred from her. Frederick's sire Little John had little success as a stallion of racehorses being primarily known as a sire of hunters. He was owned by Gratwicke's neighbour Lord Egremont.

Frederick was sent into training with the Yorkshire-born John Forth in Sussex, either at Mitchell Grove or at a Goodwood training stable owned by the Duke of Richmond.

== Racing career ==
=== 1829: three-year-old season ===
Frederick made his racecourse debut on 4 June 1829 in the Epsom Derby in which he started at odds of 40/1 in a field of seventeen runners with the 2000 Guineas winner Patron starting 6/5 favourite. According to the Sporting Review, the huge crowd included all ranks of society, from the Queen of Portugal to the "bare-footed tramp." Forth, who was at least sixty years old at the time, elected to ride the horse himself, while the stable's other runner The Exquisite, which was owned by Forth, was ridden by Frank Buckle Jr. Although The Exquisite was widely regarded as the stable's best horse and was better fancied in the betting, Forth had asked his bookmaker to shift all his bets onto Frederick on the day before the race. His bookmaker, William Crockford agreed, observing that Forth could "ride both of them for what he cared", as neither had "a ghost of a chance". The ground on Derby day was unusually fast, with one source describing it as being "as hard as Regent-street on a Summer's day". In the race the favourite, Patron, was soon struggling and a horse named Lazarus led the field in the straight. The two Forth runners both appeared to be moving strongly and moved past Lazarus a furlong from the finish, with the race apparently between them. The Exquisite took the lead and looked the likely winner, but Forth produced Frederick with a "Chifney rush" in the last strides to win by a head. Forth became the oldest jockey to win a Derby and was credited with having ridden a fine tactical race.

Frederick's only other race that year was in the St Leger at Doncaster on 15 September. Before the race, Gratwicke stayed at Weatherby Grange as the guest of Christopher Wilson ("Old Kit"), whose horse, Champion, had been the last Derby winner to take the St Leger. Wilson promised to remove the painting of Champion from above his fireplace and replace it with one of Frederick if Gratwicke's colt won. Frederick started 4/1 second favourite for the race with Rowton, a colt who had not run at Epsom, being made the 7/2 favourite. Rowton led almost from the start and won easily, with Frederick finishing sixth, having never appeared as a serious challenger. The St Leger would be Frederick's last race for nineteen months.

=== 1831: five-year-old season ===
Frederick finally returned to the racecourse in a handicap race at the Newmarket First Spring meeting in April 1831. He carried 123 pounds and finished unplaced behind Fortitude. It was then revealed that the racecourse starter had called a false start and that the race was to be re-run immediately. Frederick finished unplaced again, although on this occasion the winner was Augustus.

On Frederick's next appearance at Brighton on July 28 he carried top weight of 124 pounds in the Gold Cup and started the 2-1 second favourite. He finished third of the four runners behind Mahmoud. Three weeks later, Frederick ran in the Duke of Richmond's Plate at Goodwood. Carrying 126 pounds he finished unplaced behind the three-year-old Ciudad Rodrigo.

== Stud career ==
Frederick was retired to his owner's stud at Ham. He was in little demand as a sire, as is clear from the fact that he was advertised as covering thoroughbred mares free of charge, with a 3½ guinea fee for half-bred mares. He sired no racehorses of any consequence. Frederick died in 1837, breaking his leg when "lunging" after being startled by a runaway butcher's horse, and was buried under a chestnut tree on Gratwicke's estate. His gravestone (with the words "Frederic 1837") survives close to the 18th green of the Ham Manor Golf Club.

== Pedigree ==
Pedigree of Frederick (GB), bay stallion, 1826
Sire Little John (GB) 1816	Octavius; 1809	Orville	Beningbrough
Sire Little John (GB) 1816	Octavius; 1809	Orville	Evelina
Sire Little John (GB) 1816	Octavius; 1809	Marianne	Mufti
Sire Little John (GB) 1816	Octavius; 1809	Marianne	Maria
Sire Little John (GB) 1816	Grey Skim; 1793	Woodpecker*	Herod*
Sire Little John (GB) 1816	Grey Skim; 1793	Woodpecker*	Miss Ramsden
Sire Little John (GB) 1816	Grey Skim; 1793	Sister to Fag*	Herod*
Sire Little John (GB) 1816	Grey Skim; 1793	Sister to Fag*	Young Hag
Dam Phantom mare (GB) 1815	Phantom; 1808	Walton	Sir Peter Teazle
Dam Phantom mare (GB) 1815	Phantom; 1808	Walton	Arethusa
Dam Phantom mare (GB) 1815	Phantom; 1808	Julia	Whiskey
Dam Phantom mare (GB) 1815	Phantom; 1808	Julia	Young Giantess
Dam Phantom mare (GB) 1815	Gohanna mare 1803	Gohanna	Mercury
Dam Phantom mare (GB) 1815	Gohanna mare 1803	Gohanna	Young Hag
Dam Phantom mare (GB) 1815	Gohanna mare 1803	Chestnut Skim	Woodpecker*
Dam Phantom mare (GB) 1815	Gohanna mare 1803	Chestnut Skim	Sister to Fag* (Family:5-a)

* Frederick is inbred 3S x 4D to the stallion Woodpecker, meaning that he appears third generation on the sire side of his pedigree and fourth generation on the dam side of his pedigree.

* Frederick is inbred 3S x 4D to the mare Sister to Fag, meaning that she appears third generation on the sire side of his pedigree and fourth generation on the dam side of his pedigree.

* Frederick is inbred 4S x 4S to the stallion Herod, meaning that he appears fourth generation twice on the sire side of his pedigree.
