= Gohanna =

British Thoroughbred racehorse

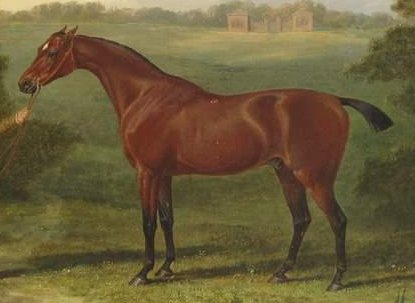
- Sire: Mercury
- Grandsire: Eclipse
- Dam: Herod mare
- Damsire: Herod
- Sex: Stallion
- Foaled: 1790
- Country: Great Britain
- Colour: Bay
- Breeder: George Wyndham, 3rd Earl of Egremont
- Owner: 3rd Earl of Egremont
- Trainer: Mr. Brown

Gohanna (1790 – April 1815) was a British racehorse that was second to Waxy in the 1793 Epsom Derby and was a successful sire in the late 18th and early 19th century. Gohanna was initially referred to as "Brother to Precipitate" during his early racing career until he was officially named in 1795. Retired to stud at Lord Egremont's Petworth House in 1801 where Gohanna spent the entirety of his 14-year stud career, he sired numerous successful racehorses including the Derby winners Election and Cardinal Beaufort.

== Background ==
Gohanna was bred by the Earl of Egremont and was foaled at his stud near Lewes in 1790. Gohanna's main racing rival was Waxy, the two horses meeting on the turf on several occasions. Both colts were similarly bred, their dams sired by Herod and their paternal lineage tracing to Eclipse and ultimately the Darley Arabian. Gohanna's sire, Mercury, was foaled in 1778 and was bred by Dennis O'Kelly. Mercury was a successful racehorse over varied distances in his three-year racing career, retiring in 1784 to Lord Egremont's stud and remaining there until his death in April 1793. Mercury was also the sire of The Oaks winners Hippolyta and Platina and was the damsire of Hannibal. Gohanna's dam, an unnamed mare sired by Herod, was bred by Sir Lawrence Dundas in 1779 and produced 12 foals between 1787 and her death in 1807. Gohanna's full-brother, Precipitate, was the Herod Mare's first foal and was a successful racer in the 1790s, winning the King's Plate, before he was sold to William Lightfoot and exported to the United States in the autumn of 1803. Precipitate died at the farm of John C. Goode in Mecklenburg County, Virginia in 1806 immediately after covering a mare.

Gohanna was a strong, stocky bay horse on short legs with a small white star on his forehead. His proportions were more fitting a hunter than a racehorse and his physical appearance was vastly different than Waxy's who was taller and of a more delicate build.

Until 1913 for three-year-olds and 1946 for two-year-olds, British racehorses were not required to be officially named. For the first two years of Gohanna's racing career he was known as Lord Egremont's bay colt by Mercury or "Brother to Precipitate" due to him being a full-brother of the well-known racer. He was named "Gohanna" at the beginning of 1795 racing season, the choice derived from the hills of the same name that Lord Egremont used as pasture land for his broodmares.

== Racing career ==
During the early part of Lord Egremont's racing career, his horses were "home trained" at a training grounds near the wall surrounding his estate at Petworth and were placed under the care of his trainer Mr. Brown (who was from Lewes). Gohanna was once called the "Pride of Petworth" and raced Waxy six times in his career, losing to him in all but one race, a match race at Newmarket in 1794 where Waxy carried two more pounds than Gohanna and lost by half a head.

=== 1793:three-year-old season ===
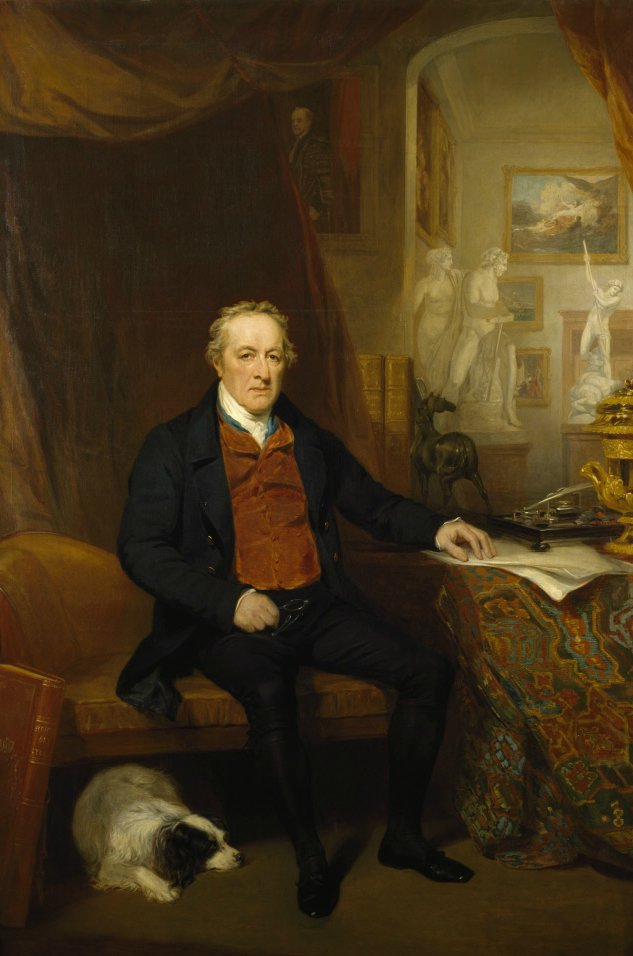
Gohanna was bred and owned by the Earl of Egremont and stood his entire stud career at Petworth House.

Gohanna did not race as a two-year-old, his first start being at the Craven meeting in April. He was second in a 20-guinea sweepstakes to "brother to Skyscraper" (later named Top Gallant) and beat Warwick in a sweepstakes race. At the Newmarket spring meeting, he won the first, second and third classes of the Prince's Stakes.

The Epsom Derby occurred on 18 May and was attended by "as numerous a company as ever appeared on the course." Eleven horses lined up for the start, seven of them sired by Pot-8-Os. The starting odds for "Brother to Precipitate" (later named Gohanna in 1795) were near even against the field with 100 to 7 and 100 to 10 odds on Waxy (depending on the bookmaking operation). In the Tattersalls betting room Gohanna was the clear favorite with Waxy "so little thought of, that he had never been mentioned" in the betting. Gohanna took the lead in the initial strides of the race. Waxy pushed Gohanna (a "bump" in modern racing terms) at the track's first turn, taking and maintaining the lead to become an "easy winner" of the Derby. Three of the top four finishers, the exception being Gohanna, were sired by Pot-8-Os The meeting was also notable for a "dreadful accident," a collision between a servant on horseback with the colt Exiseman, the winner of the race after the Derby, and for the antics of John Lade dressed in a "loose undress of blue and white striped trowsers" asking the crowd to determine whether he was "the captain of a privateer or an ambassador from the Great Mogul."

At the Newmarket Houghton meeting, Gohanna won a 1,400 guinea sweepstakes race, beating Druid, and at the same meeting beat the filly Caelia (the Oaks winner) in a match race.

=== 1794: four-year-old season ===
In April Gohanna was unplaced in the second class of the Oatlands Stakes won by Lord Grosvenor's colt Druid. The next day, he won a sweepstakes race at 9 to 2 odds, beating Druid and Mr. Barry's colt Old Tat. Lord Egremont paid forfeit to Mr. Wilson's colt Buzzard at the meeting after backing out of a match race. In May he won the Claret Stakes of 1,000 guineas, beating the only other competitor, the Duke of Bedford's colt Teucer. A few days later, he lost the Jockey Club Plate to Waxy in a three-horse field. The next day, Gohanna beat Waxy in a 100 guinea match race at equal weights. At Lewes on 31 July, Gohanna won a 1,200 guineas sweepstakes beating the colts Guatimozin and Royalist. A few hours after the win, Gohanna lost the four-mile Duke of Richmond's Plate for horses bred in Sussex, losing to his old rival Waxy at equal weights. He walked over for a 40-guinea subscription race the same day. He won a match race against Lord Clermont's Heroine at the October Newmarket meeting, conceding four pounds to the filly in the race. The next day, he finished second in a 50 guinea subscription race to the aged horse Coriander who was carrying 26 more pounds than Gohanna.

=== 1795: five-year-old season ===
Officially named Gohanna, he was unplaced in the Oatlands Stakes, losing to the colt Gabriel. He beat the colt Darsham in a match race at Newmarket and walked over for a £50 race at Lewes. Gohanna won the King's Plate at Lichfield and won the Warwick King's Plate against four other horses.

=== 1796: six-year-old season ===
On 17 May at Guildford in Gohanna's first start of the season, he ran against Waxy and Mr. Wilkins's horse Monoculus in the His Majesty's Plate of 100 guineas run over three four-mile heats. Gohanna was second in the first and third heat and ran a dead heat with Waxy for the second heat. Monoculus withdrew from the third heat, the race ultimately won by Waxy. In August at Lewes, Gohanna walked over for the His Majesty's Plate and won both heats of the two and a half mile County Plate from Sir Poole's half-sister to Waxy, Keren-happuch. Waxy beat Gohanna in the Salisbury His Majesty's Plate on 31 August. At Warwick, Gohanna won both 4-mile heats of the His Majesty's Plate, beating Diogenes while carrying 168 pounds.

=== Later career ===
In 1797, he finished last in the Oatlands Stakes at Guildford and was second at Ascot in a sweepstakes race, losing to Little Devil. At Lewes, he was beaten by Mr. Durand's colt Play or Pay for the County Plate and at Egham he walked over for a 45-guinea sweepstakes race. Gohanna started once in 1798, for the £50 County Plate at Lewes, winning the first and third heats over Play or Pay. In 1799, he won a 125 guinea race at Brighton and did not win in four other races. Gohanna started three times in 1800. He was last in a £50 race at Epsom competing against Parisot and Mr. Durand's horse Johnny. He was third in the Pavilion Stakes and won the County Plate at Lewes against Cadet. Ending his career with a last win, Gohanna was retired to stud at the end of the 1800 racing season.

== Stud career ==
Retired to stud in 1801, Gohanna spent his entire 14-year stud career at Petworth House. Gohanna sired many successful racehorses, including the Derby winners Election and Cardinal Beaufort and the good sires Canopus, the damsire of Lap-dog and Spaniel, and Golumpus. Unlike Waxy, Gohanna's direct male line is extinct, his last descendant being Warwick which died in 1894. Gohanna's daughter the Gohanna mare was the grandam of the Derby winner Frederick.

Gohanna died in April 1815 immediately after servicing the mare Shoestrings.

== Sire line tree ==
- Gohanna
  - Cardinal Beaufort
  - Cerberus
    - Captain Candid
  - Golumpus
    - Beverley
    - Catton
      - Coronation
      - Sandbeck
        - Redshank
        - Humphrey
      - Akarius
      - Swap
        - Lochinvar
      - Panmure
      - Scarborough (1820)
      - Contract
        - Chorister
      - Cromarty
      - King Catton
      - Mulatto
        - Sepoy
        - Bloomsbury
        - Discord
        - Maroon
        - Molineux
        - Swinton
        - Old England
      - Royal Oak
        - Slane
        - Plover
        - Commodore Napier
        - King Charles
        - Porthos
      - Tarrare
        - Derby
      - Truth
      - Nonplus
        - Buford
      - Scarborough (1824)
      - Cambridge
      - Coronet
      - Cicercian
      - Clarion
      - Contest
      - Creole
      - Bassetlaw
      - Minster
      - Trustee
        - Tempest
        - Revenue
      - Maeonides
      - Florestan
      - Mundig
      - St Bennett
    - Otterington
    - Uncle Toby
    - Savernake
    - Aimwell
  - Canopus
    - Scarecrow
    - Centaur
  - Hedley
    - Idle Boy
    - Frolic
    - Prince Leopold
  - Trafalgar
  - Brighton
  - Coriolanus
  - Election
    - Manfred
    - Regent
    - Gustavus
      - Forester
      - Young Gustavus
    - Manzeppa
    - Rufus
  - Cestrian
  - Scorpion
  - Interloper
  - The Dandy
  - Punic
  - Robin Adair
  - Young Gohanna
    - Legal Tender
  - Wanderer
    - Gaberlunzie
    - Rasselas
    - Young Wanderer
      - Mozart
  - Belleropheron
  - Skim

== Pedigree ==
Pedigree of Gohanna (GB), Bay Horse, 1790
Sire Mercury (GB) 1778	Eclipse; 1764	Marske	Squirt*
Sire Mercury (GB) 1778	Eclipse; 1764	Marske	The Ruby mare
Sire Mercury (GB) 1778	Eclipse; 1764	Spilletta	Regulus
Sire Mercury (GB) 1778	Eclipse; 1764	Spilletta	Mother Western
Sire Mercury (GB) 1778	Tartar mare 1757	Tartar*	Partner*^
Sire Mercury (GB) 1778	Tartar mare 1757	Tartar*	Meliora*
Sire Mercury (GB) 1778	Tartar mare 1757	Sister to Mogul mare	Mogul
Sire Mercury (GB) 1778	Tartar mare 1757	Sister to Mogul mare	Sweepstakes mare
Dam Herod mare (GB) Bay, 1779	Herod; 1758	Tartar*	Partner*^
Dam Herod mare (GB) Bay, 1779	Herod; 1758	Tartar*	Meliora*
Dam Herod mare (GB) Bay, 1779	Herod; 1758	Cypron	Blaze
Dam Herod mare (GB) Bay, 1779	Herod; 1758	Cypron	Salome
Dam Herod mare (GB) Bay, 1779	Maiden; 1770	Matchem	Cade
Dam Herod mare (GB) Bay, 1779	Maiden; 1770	Matchem	Sister 2 to Miss Partner^
Dam Herod mare (GB) Bay, 1779	Maiden; 1770	Pratt's Old Mare	Squirt*
Dam Herod mare (GB) Bay, 1779	Maiden; 1770	Pratt's Old Mare	Mogul mare (Family 24)

* Gohanna is inbred 3S × 3D to the stallion Tartar, meaning that he appears third generation on the sire side of his pedigree and third generation on the dam side of his pedigree.

* Gohanna is inbred 4S × 4D to the stallion Squirt, meaning that he appears fourth generation on the sire side of his pedigree and fourth generation on the dam side of his pedigree.

* Gohanna is inbred 4S × 4D x 5D to the stallion Partner, meaning that he appears fourth generation on the sire side of his pedigree and fourth generation and fifth generation (via Sister 2 to Miss Partner)^ on the dam side of his pedigree.
