= The Merry Monarch =

British-bred Thoroughbred racehorse

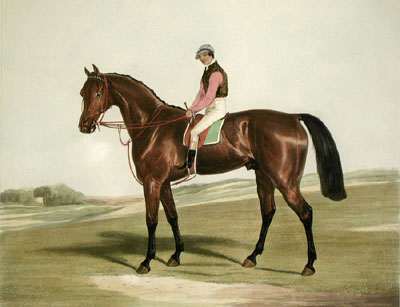
- The Merry Monarch with jockey Foster Bell. Painting by Francis Calcraft Turner.
- Sire: Slane
- Grandsire: Royal Oak
- Dam: The Margravine
- Damsire: Little John
- Sex: Stallion
- Foaled: 1842
- Country: United Kingdom of Great Britain and Ireland
- Colour: Bay
- Breeder: G. W. Gratwicke
- Owner: G. W. Gratwicke
- Trainer: John Forth
- Record: 4:1-1-0

Major wins
- Epsom Derby (1845)

The Merry Monarch (1842 – after 1859) was a British Thoroughbred racehorse and sire. He ran four times in a career that lasted from July 1844 to May 1846 and won only one race. That race, however, was the 1845 Epsom Derby, in which he recorded an unexpected victory in a chaotic race. After one race in 1846 he was retired to stud where he made no impression as a stallion.

== Background ==
The Merry Monarch was a bay horse bred by his owner, William Gratwicke of Ham Manor, near Angmering in Sussex. Gratwicke also bred his dam, The Margravine, who was a sister to the 1829 Derby winner Frederick. His sire, Slane, was runner-up in the Ascot Gold Cup and, thanks largely to The Merry Monarch's Derby win, was Champion sire in 1845.

The Merry Monarch was sent into training with John "Daddy" Forth who, at the age of sixty, had trained and ridden Frederick in the Derby. Gratwicke's horses were based at Goodwood at a stable owned by the Duke of Richmond. Following a disagreement with the Duke, Gratwicke moved his horses to Newmarket, Suffolk.

== Racing career ==
=== 1844: two-year-old season ===
On his first racecourse appearance, The Merry Monarch ran in the Ham Stakes at Goodwood in July. He finished unplaced behind Refraction, a filly who went on to win The Oaks in 1845.

=== 1845: three-year-old season ===
The Merry Monarch's first race of 1846 was the Derby at Epsom. The build-up to the race was marred by reports of a plot to either lame or poison Old England, one of the favourites for the race, while another one of the leading contenders, The Libel, was allegedly drugged ("doctored"). Poor weather on the morning of the race did not deter the crowd, which was reported to be as large and unruly as ever. Ridden by the little-known Foster Bell, The Merry Monarch started at odds of 15/1 in a record field of thirty one runners. These official odds however, were offered jointly for The Merry Monarch and his stable companion Doleful: according to The Sporting Magazine, odds of 35/1 would have been more accurate reflection of the actual betting. The start of the race was delayed by almost an hour by a series of false starts and an incident in which one of the leading contenders, Alarm was kicked by The Libel. Alarm threw off his jockey, Nat Flatman, ran into a chain fence and then galloped loose down the course for several minutes before being caught. Both Alarm and Flatman were injured, but took part in the race when it eventually got under way. The Merry Monarch was among the leading group from the start, and was in fourth place at the turn into the straight, where one horse fell and several others were badly hampered. Approaching the final furlong, Bell sent The Merry Monarch to the front and he established a clear lead before staying on well to win "in clever style" by a length from Annandale, with Old England a neck away in third. The result was a major surprise to most observers, including, it was reported, the winner's own connections, who had believed that their other runner, Doleful, had the better chance of winning.

In July, The Merry Monarch was sent to Goodwood for the Gratwicke Stakes. He finished second, beaten a head by Hersey, a mare whose only previous win had come in a "fifty pound plate". Despite his defeat, The Merry Monarch remained among the leading fancies for the St Leger, but he did not appear again that year.

The Merry Monarch's prize of £3,975 for the Derby was enough to make him the third highest money winner of the British season behind Refraction and Sweetmeat.

=== 1846: four-year-old season ===
On his only race as a four-year-old, The Merry Monarch returned to Epsom for the Grand Stand Plate, a mile and a quarter handicap on the day after the Derby. Carrying top weight of 118 pounds, he finished unplaced behind an unnamed colt owned by James Merry.

Before the end of the year, The Merry Monarch changed hands three times. Following his run at Epsom he was bought by Lord George Bentinck, but a month later, Bentinck decided to give up his racing interests to concentrate on politics and sold all his horses for £10,000 to Edward Lloyd-Mostyn. The Merry Monarch was put up for auction and bought back by his original owner, William Gratwicke for 78 guineas.

== Assessment ==
The Sportsman magazine described The Merry Monarch as "a very bad horse" and his Derby win as the biggest "fluke" in the history of the race. The Farmer's Magazine concurred, calling the result "one of the greatest flukes that we have on record".

== Stud career ==
The Merry Monarch stood as a stallion at his owner's stud at Ham, where his fee was initially 10 guineas. He attracted few mares however, and in only his second year at stud, he was covering mares at no fee apart from "a sovereign for the groom". He was the damsire of a filly named Bertha, who finished second in the 1000 Guineas and won the Nassau Stakes in 1862, but otherwise made no impact.

== Pedigree ==
Pedigree of The Merry Monarch (GB), bay stallion, 1842
Sire Slane (GB) 1833	Royal Oak; 1823	Catton	Golumpus*^
Sire Slane (GB) 1833	Royal Oak; 1823	Catton	Lucy Gray
Sire Slane (GB) 1833	Royal Oak; 1823	Smolensko mare	Smolensko
Sire Slane (GB) 1833	Royal Oak; 1823	Smolensko mare	Lady Mary
Sire Slane (GB) 1833	Orville mare 1819	Orville*	Beningbrough
Sire Slane (GB) 1833	Orville mare 1819	Orville*	Evelina
Sire Slane (GB) 1833	Orville mare 1819	Epsom Lass	Sir Peter Teazle
Sire Slane (GB) 1833	Orville mare 1819	Epsom Lass	Alexina
Dam The Margravine(GB) 1830	Little John; 1816	Octavius	Orville*
Dam The Margravine(GB) 1830	Little John; 1816	Octavius	Marianne
Dam The Margravine(GB) 1830	Little John; 1816	Grey Skim	Woodpecker*^
Dam The Margravine(GB) 1830	Little John; 1816	Grey Skim	Milsintown's Herod mare
Dam The Margravine(GB) 1830	Phantom mare 1815	Phantom	Walton
Dam The Margravine(GB) 1830	Phantom mare 1815	Phantom	Julia
Dam The Margravine(GB) 1830	Phantom mare 1815	Gohanna mare	Gohanna*^
Dam The Margravine(GB) 1830	Phantom mare 1815	Gohanna mare	Chestnut Skim*^ (Family:5-a)

* The Merry Monarch is inbred 3S x 4D to the stallion Orville, meaning that he appears third generation on the sire side of his pedigree and fourth generation on the dam side of his pedigree.

* The Merry Monarch is inbred 5S x 4D to the stallion Gohanna, meaning that he appears fifth generation (via Golumpus)^ on the sire side of his pedigree and fourth generation on the dam side of his pedigree.

* The Merry Monarch is inbred 4D x 5D to the stallion Woodpecker, meaning that he appears fourth generation and fifth generation (via Chestnut Skim)^ on the dam side of his pedigree.
