= Bloomsbury (horse) =

British-bred Thoroughbred racehorse

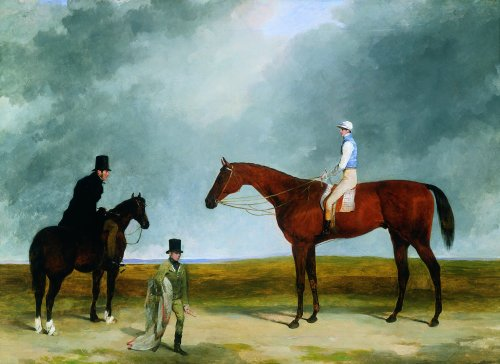
- Bloomsbury. Painting by Harry Hall.
- Sire: Mulatto
- Grandsire: Catton
- Dam: Arcot Lass
- Damsire: Ardrossan
- Sex: Stallion
- Foaled: 1836
- Country: United Kingdom of Great Britain and Ireland
- Colour: Bay
- Breeder: Mr Cattle
- Owner: Lord Chesterfield; William Ridsdale
- Trainer: William Ridsdale
- Record: 10:4-2-2

Major wins
- Epsom Derby (1839); Ascot Derby (1839)

Bloomsbury (1836 –1861) was a British Thoroughbred racehorse and sire. In a career that lasted from May 1839 to July 1841 he ran ten times and won four races. His most important win came on his first racecourse appearance when he won the 1839 Derby. He went on to win important races at Ascot and Liverpool before his retirement after his five-year-old season. He was later exported to stand as a stallion in Germany. Bloomsbury's controversial origins were the subject of two formal objections and a court case which led to a crisis in English racing.

== Background ==
Bloomsbury was a bay horse described as looking "coarse" but very powerful, standing 15.3 hands high, bred by Mr Cattle, a farmer from Sheriff Hutton. The colt was sired by Mulatto the winner of the 1827 Doncaster Cup who went on to be a good, but unexceptional sire. Bloomsbury's dam, Arcot Lass, was one of the few mares to produce two Derby winners: her son St. Giles had won the race in 1832.

According to one account, the colt was acquired as a foal from his breeder by Robert Ridsdale, a professional gambler with a dubious reputation. When Ridsdale was forced to sell his horses in 1836, no bids were made for a weanling colt by Mulatto and his ownership was transferred to Ridsdale's brother, William, who also trained the horse, later named Bloomsbury, for racing. Ridsdale then sold the colt to Lord Chesterfield. According to another version, he was bought by Lord Chesterfield direct from his breeder as a yearling and then sent to be trained by William Ridsdale. Bloomsbury was certainly recorded as the property of Mr Ridsdale when entries for the 1839 St Leger were published at the start of 1838. The best contemporary account states that Robert Ridsdale had an arrangement with Mr Cattle to buy all the offspring of Arcot Lass. This arrangement was inherited by William Ridsdale who thereby acquired Bloomsbury and sold him to Chesterfield, although the details of the sale were never formally recorded. The exact details of Bloomsbury's breeding and ownership later became the subject of controversy.

== Racing career ==
=== 1839: three-year-old season ===
In early 1839 Lord Chesterfield, withdrew the horses he owned from Ridsdale's stable and claimed Bloomsbury as his property. The dispute looked likely to result in Bloomsbury's entry for the Derby being declared void, but the matter was resolved when it was agreed that Chesterfield should be paid compensation for all Bloomsbury's entry fees and forfeits. The money was believed to come from Harry Hill, a bookmaker who stood to win a great deal of money if Bloomsbury won the Derby.

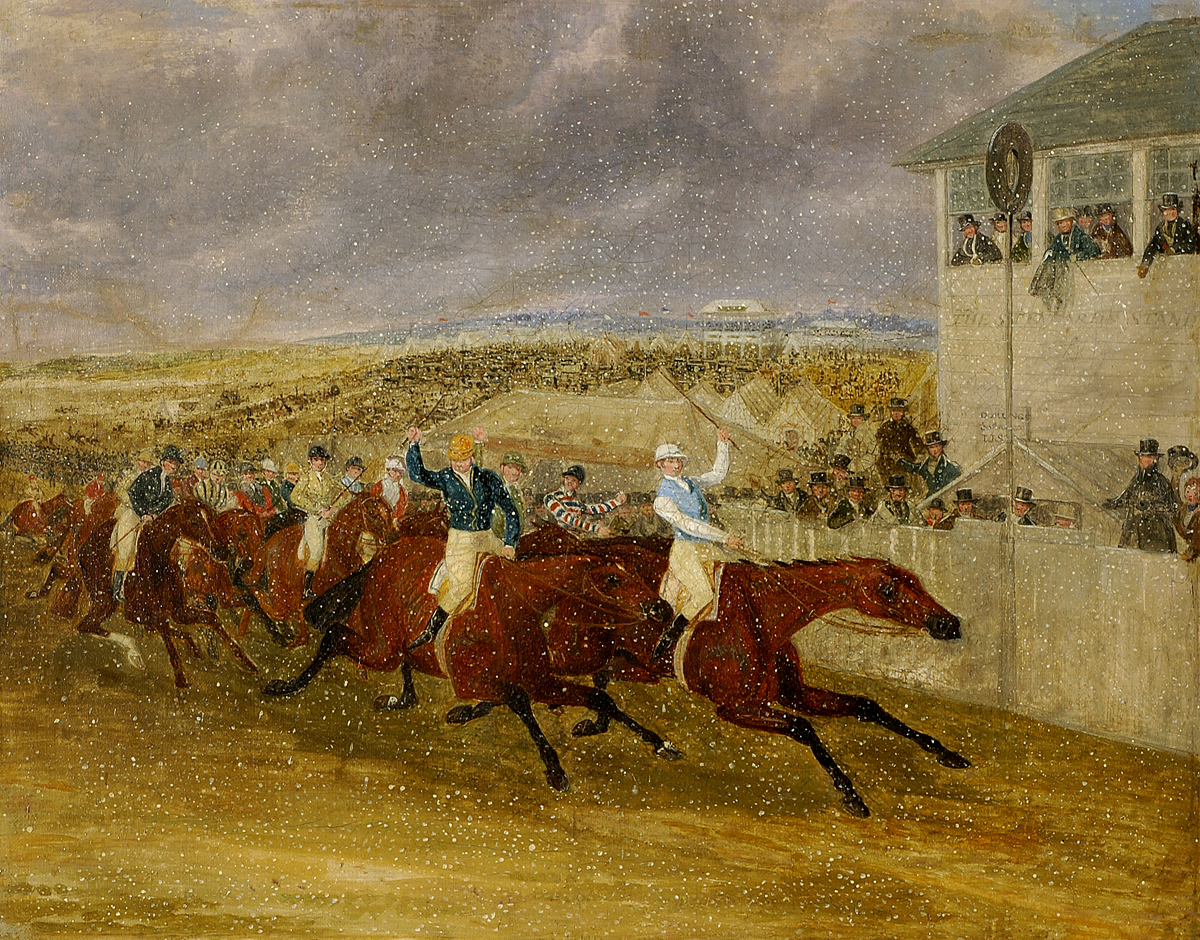
The "snowstorm" finish of the 1839 Derby, by James Pollard.

Bloomsbury was entered in the Clarendon Stakes at Newmarket on 18 April, but was withdrawn, meaning that he was sent to Epsom for the Derby without having raced in public. At Epsom on 15 May he started as a 25/1 outsider in a field of twenty-one runners, with Sleight-of-hand being made the 5/1 favourite. The day was bitterly cold and the race itself was run in a snowstorm. Ridden by Samuel "Sim" Templeman, he was well-placed ("always handy") and turned into the straight in third or fourth place behind the filly Deception who had a clear advantage over Euclid. At one stage, the filly's lead grew to five lengths, but Templeman moved steadily closer on Bloomsbury and made his challenge a furlong from the finish. Bloomsbury overtook Euclid and then caught the filly to win "cleverly" by a length.

Questions about the true identity of Bloomsbury were raised immediately after the Derby. Deception's owner, Fulwar Craven, lodged an official objection, claiming that Bloomsbury's pedigree had been inaccurately recorded. The colt had been registered by Weatherbys in the General Stud Book as having been sired "by Mulatto or Tramp", implying that his dam had been "covered" by both stallions in the year of his conception, but when entered for the Derby he was recorded as being simply "by Mulatto". The objection was not sustained by the stewards who felt that there was insufficient evidence. Craven was unwilling to accept the decision, claiming that he had been given insufficient time to prepare his case and announced his intention of taking legal action. The gambling community was left in a state of confusion, with bookmakers refusing to pay out on "winning" bets.

Bloomsbury was then sent to Royal Ascot where he ran twice. On 4 June he ran in the Ascot Derby, a race now known as the King Edward VII Stakes. Despite carrying a five pound weight penalty as a result of his Derby win, he started 1/5 favourite and won by a length from the 2000 Guineas winner The Corsair. Two days later at the same meeting he won a £200 Sweepstakes, beating his only rival, an unnamed "sister to Hector", who reportedly had only been entered in the hope that Bloomsbury would be declared ineligible to run because of his questionable pedigree.

More controversy followed Bloomsbury's Ascot success. The Corsair's owner, Lord Lichfield, with the support of Lord George Bentinck, lodged an objection on the grounds that Bloomsbury's identity was not as described in the race entries. The Jockey Club declined to adjudicate and the matter went to court in Liverpool where, on 22 August, a special jury found in favour of Ridsdale. Several witnesses gave evidence that Mulatto had been the only stallion to cover Arcot Lass in 1835. The information given to the compilers of the Stud Book on the other hand, was shown to have been inadequately sourced, relying on the word of a local racing official named Orton rather than Weatherbys staff. The editor of the Sporting Review, commenting on what he called "The Crisis of English Racing", expressed the view that the case had been unfairly represented as a clash between "might and right", with the jury siding with the "yeoman" against "his lord". The New Sporting Magazine took the opposing view characterizing the case against Ridsdale as a vindictive action conducted by the racing establishment and disgruntled gamblers. The case reportedly caused "a great sensation in the sporting world". Future editions of the Stud Book removed the reference to Tramp.

In September, Bloomsbury was sent to Doncaster for the Great St Leger. He looked much less impressive than he had in summer, appearing underweight and suffering from a cracked heel. Bloomsbury started second favourite but lost his unbeaten record as he finished sixth of the twelve runners, having apparently "cut it" (given up) when put under pressure just after half way. The race was won by Charles the Twelfth, who defeated Euclid in a run-off following a dead-heat. Two days later Bloomsbury reappeared in a £200 Sweepstakes in which he started odds-on favourite but was again struggling well before turning into the straight and finished last of the three runners behind to Epidaurus and The Corsair.

=== 1840: four-year-old season ===
Bloomsbury's first start as a four-year-old came at Royal Ascot in June, when he ran in the Ascot Gold Cup, starting the 7/2 second favourite. According to press reports, Bloomsbury's jockey was unable to restrain him and he took the lead from the start. He was overtaken in the straight and finished third of the eight runners behind St. Francis. In July at Liverpool Bloomsbury started odds-on favourite and recorded his first win for over a year by beating an unnamed three-year-old filly by Lamplighter at weight-for-age in the one and a quarter mile Croxteth Stakes.

At Newmarket in October, Bloomsbury carried top weight of 126 pounds in the second running of the Cesarewitch Handicap. Ridden by Sam Chifney, Bloomsbury was produced with a strong run at the end of the two and a quarter mile race, but hung away from Chifney's whip, and in a very rough and close finish, he was beaten by a neck into second place by Clarion.

=== 1841: five-year-old season ===
On his first start as a five-year-old, Bloomsbury returned to Royal Ascot for a second attempt at the Gold Cup on 3 June. On this occasion he finished fifth of the six runners behind Lanercost. Bloomsbury's final race came at Liverpool on 14 July when he ran in the Croxteth Stakes. He disputed the lead from the start with the four-year-old Doctor Caius, and after a "severely contested" race finished second by a neck.

== Assessment ==
During this period there were rumours that several horses entered for the Classics, races restricted to three-year-olds, were in fact four-year-old "ringers". "Running Rein" was disqualified from the 1844 Derby on these grounds and there were serious doubts about the 1840 winner Little Wonder. A modern source claims that there were "good grounds" for suspecting that Bloomsbury was four when he won the Derby. When describing the colt, the Farmer's Magazine commented that he was "overgrown" and appeared to have been trained and fed to "what may be called a state of precocious maturity" while remarking that he was most unlikely to improve with age.

== Stud career ==
At the end of his racing career, Bloomsbury was sold and exported to stand as a stud in Germany. In 1842, Bloomsbury was reported by a correspondent for New Sporting Magazine to be in Baron Malzahn's stud farm in Kummerow standing alongside Gustavus. He sired A Better One and Leonidas who both won the Henckel-Rennen and was the damsire of the Preis der Diana winners Lady Bird and Caro Dame. He died in 1861.

== Pedigree ==
Pedigree of Bloomsbury (GB), bay stallion, 1836
Sire Mulatto(GB) 1823	Catton; 1809	Golumpus	Gohanna
Sire Mulatto(GB) 1823	Catton; 1809	Golumpus	Catherine
Sire Mulatto(GB) 1823	Catton; 1809	Lucy Grey	Timothy
Sire Mulatto(GB) 1823	Catton; 1809	Lucy Grey	Lucy
Sire Mulatto(GB) 1823	Desdemona; 1811	Orville	Beningbrough
Sire Mulatto(GB) 1823	Desdemona; 1811	Orville	Evelina
Sire Mulatto(GB) 1823	Desdemona; 1811	Fanny	Sir Peter Teazle
Sire Mulatto(GB) 1823	Desdemona; 1811	Fanny	Diomed mare
Dam Arcot Lass (GB) 1821	Ardrossan; 1809	John Bull	Fortitude
Dam Arcot Lass (GB) 1821	Ardrossan; 1809	John Bull	Xantippe
Dam Arcot Lass (GB) 1821	Ardrossan; 1809	Miss Whip	Volunteer
Dam Arcot Lass (GB) 1821	Ardrossan; 1809	Miss Whip	Wimbleton
Dam Arcot Lass (GB) 1821	Cramlington mare 1817	Cramlington	Pipator
Dam Arcot Lass (GB) 1821	Cramlington mare 1817	Cramlington	Harriet
Dam Arcot Lass (GB) 1821	Cramlington mare 1817	Floyerkin	Stride
Dam Arcot Lass (GB) 1821	Cramlington mare 1817	Floyerkin	Javelin mare (Family:9-c)
