= Tarrare (horse) =

British-bred Thoroughbred racehorse

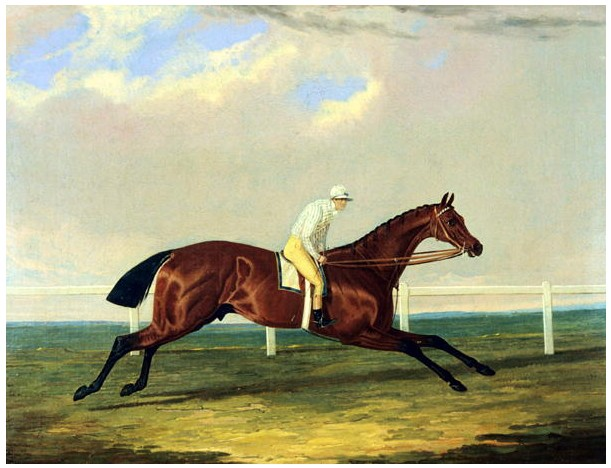
- Tarrare with jockey George Nelson
- Sire: Catton
- Grandsire: Golumpus
- Dam: Henrietta
- Damsire: Sir Solomon
- Sex: Stallion
- Foaled: 1823
- Country: United Kingdom
- Colour: Bay
- Owner: Earl of Scarbrough
- Trainer: Sam King
- Record: 4:2-1-0

Major wins
- Great St Leger (1826)

Tarrare (1823 – 1847) was a British Thoroughbred racehorse. He is known for winning the 1826 Doncaster St. Leger.

== Background ==
Tarrare was a dark bay horse, standing 16.1 hands high, bred by his owner Richard Lumley-Saunderson, 6th Earl of Scarbrough. He was sired by Catton a noted racing stallion. His bloodline also included Eclipse, Matchem, and Herod.

== Racing career ==
Tarrare made his first and only appearance in 1826 in the Great St Leger at Doncaster Racecourse in September. The race was the first after the course had been altered by being slightly shortened and the starting gate widened. Starting at odds of 20/1 he won from Lord Fitzwilliam's colt Mulatto, also a son of Catton Tarrare was ridden in the St. Leger by jockey George Nelson.

Tarrare reappeared at York Racecourse in August 1827. He started odds on favourite for a two-mile sweepstakes but was beaten by Jerry, the 1824 St Leger winner. At the same meeting he won a similar event without having to race when he was allowed a walkover. In September he returned to the site of his St Leger victory and finished unplaced behind Mulatto in the Doncaster Cup.

== Stud record ==
Tarrare began his career as a stallion at Stockwell in Surrey, where he stood at a fee of ten guineas in 1829. He was later exported to France where he sired his best runner, a filly named Cavatine who finished runner-up in the Prix du Jockey Club and won the race now known as the Prix Gladiateur. Tarrare died in France in 1847.
