= Catton (horse) =

British Thoroughbred racehorse

- Sire: Golumpus
- Grandsire: Gohanna
- Dam: Lucy Gray
- Damsire: Timothy
- Sex: Stallion
- Foaled: 1809
- Country: Great Britain
- Colour: Bay
- Record: 32, 22-6-1

Catton (1809 – 1833) was a British racehorse who won 22 races, including an unbeaten streak in 14 consecutive races, and was a successful sire.

== Background ==
Catton was bred at Catton, by Horsely and King. He was purchased by Richard Lumley Saunderson, 6th Earl of Scarborough, of Sandbeck Park. He was described as a horse of medium size with great strength and quality.

== Racing career ==
Catton raced from 1812 to 1818. He won 22 of 32 races, including 14 in a row. He won the Doncaster Cup in 1815.

== Stud career ==
Notable offspring:

- Mulatto (1823) - successful stallion
- Royal Oak (1823) - successful stallion
- Tarrare (1823) - won the St Leger Stakes
- Gallopade (1828) - successful mare in the United States
- Trustee (1829) - Leading sire in North America
- Mundig (1832) - won the Epson Derby

== Sire line tree ==
- Catton
  - Coronation
  - Sandbeck
    - Redshank
    - Humphrey
  - Akarius
  - Swap
    - Lochinvar
  - Panmure
  - Scarborough (1820)
  - Contract
    - Chorister
  - Cromarty
  - King Catton
  - Mulatto
    - Sepoy
    - Bloomsbury
      - The Iron Marshall
      - Leonidas
    - Discord
    - Maroon
    - Molineux
      - Duc-An-Dhurras
    - Swinton
    - Old England
      - Defiance
        - Tolurno
      - Haco
  - Royal Oak
    - Slane
      - The Scavenger
      - The Merry Monarch
      - Sting
        - Moustique
        - Baroncino
        - Monarque
        - Peu d'Espoir
        - Bon Vivant
        - Minos
          - Reugny
      - Conyngham
      - Glendower
      - Sesostris
      - Little Jack
        - Alfold
      - Mildew
        - High Treason
      - Little David
      - Blight
      - Quince
      - Coroebus
    - Plover
    - Commodore Napier
    - King Charles
    - Porthos
  - Tarrare
    - Derby
  - Truth
  - Nonplus
    - Buford
  - Scarborough (1824)
  - Cambridge
  - Coronet
  - Cicercian
  - Clarion
  - Contest
  - Creole
  - Bassetlaw
  - Minster
  - Trustee
    - Tempest
      - Whirlwind
    - Revenue
      - Engineer
      - Deucalion
      - Planet
        - Plantagenet
        - Grey Planet
        - Hubbard
        - Whisper
        - Dudley
        - Plainroid
      - Two Bitts
      - Exchequer
      - Eugene
      - Oakland
        - Princeton
          - Willie W
      - Revolver
        - Culpepper
      - Lewis E Smith
      - Rivoli
        - Amadis
  - Maeonides
  - Florestan
  - Mundig
  - St Bennett

== Pedigree ==
Pedigree of Catton (GB), bay horse, 1809
Sire Golumpus (GB) 1802	Gohanna; 1790	Mercury	Eclipse*
Sire Golumpus (GB) 1802	Gohanna; 1790	Mercury	Tartar mare
Sire Golumpus (GB) 1802	Gohanna; 1790	Herod mare	Herod*
Sire Golumpus (GB) 1802	Gohanna; 1790	Herod mare	Maiden
Sire Golumpus (GB) 1802	Catherine; 1795	Woodpecker	Herod*
Sire Golumpus (GB) 1802	Catherine; 1795	Woodpecker	Miss Ramsden
Sire Golumpus (GB) 1802	Catherine; 1795	Camilla	Trentham
Sire Golumpus (GB) 1802	Catherine; 1795	Camilla	Coquette
Dam Lucy Gray (GB) 1804	Timothy; 1794	Delpini	Highflyer*^
Dam Lucy Gray (GB) 1804	Timothy; 1794	Delpini	Countess
Dam Lucy Gray (GB) 1804	Timothy; 1794	Cora	Matchem
Dam Lucy Gray (GB) 1804	Timothy; 1794	Cora	Turk mare
Dam Lucy Gray (GB) 1804	Lucy; 1789	Florizel	Herod*
Dam Lucy Gray (GB) 1804	Lucy; 1789	Florizel	Cygnet mare
Dam Lucy Gray (GB) 1804	Lucy; 1789	Frenzy	Eclipse*
Dam Lucy Gray (GB) 1804	Lucy; 1789	Frenzy	Engineer mare

*^ Catton is inbred 4S × 4S x 5D x 4D to the stallion Herod, meaning that he appears fourth generation twice on the sire side of his pedigree and fifth generation once (via Highflyer)^ and fourth generation once on the dam side of his pedigree.

* Catton is inbred 4S × 4D to the stallion Eclipse, meaning that he appears fourth generation on the sire side of his pedigree and fourth generation on the dam side of his pedigree.
