= Joe Andrews =

Welsh footballer (born 2006)

Personal information
- Full name: Joseph Daniel Andrews
- Date of birth: 14 February 2006 (age 20)
- Place of birth: Wales
- Position: Midfielder

Team information
- Current team: Peterborough United

Youth career
- Bradford Town
- Bath and Wiltshire Boys
- –2024: Southampton

Senior career*
Years	Team	Apps	(Gls)
2024–2025	Chippenham Town	23	(0)
2025–	Peterborough United	1	(0)
2025	→ Chippenham Town (loan)	11	(0)
2025	→ Bedford Town (loan)	3	(0)
2026	→ Brackley Town (loan)	3	(0)
2026	→ Chesham United (loan)	7	(0)

International career^{‡}
2022–2023	Wales U17	9	(0)
2025	Wales U19	2	(0)
- * Club domestic league appearances and goals as of 21:50, 2 October 2026 (UTC) ‡ National team caps and goals as of 20:22, 3 May 2025

Joseph Daniel Andrews (born 14 February 2006) is a Welsh professional footballer who plays as a midfielder for EFL League One club Peterborough United.

== Club career ==
=== Early and personal life ===
Andrews was born in Wales, and began his career with Bradford Town, before joining Bath and Wiltshire Boys. He attended St Augustine's Catholic College in Trowbridge where his father, Matt, is a PE teacher.

=== Youth career ===
Andrews was part of the Southampton academy for 12 years, including call ups to the U23 side, before being released at the end of the 2023–24 season.

=== Chippenham Town ===
Upon his release from Southampton, Andrews joined Chippenham Town, then of the National League South. He quickly became a regular with the Bluebirds, gathering interest from Norwich City, Coventry City, Swansea City and Peterborough United.

=== Peterborough United ===
Andrews joined Peterborough United on 3 February 2025, citing the club's history of developing younger players as a main reason for signing on. He re-joined Chippenham on loan until the end of the season.

Andrews was first called up to the senior squad on 30 April 2025, appearing on the bench during a 4–2 defeat to Mansfield Town. He would make his senior debut the same week, coming on as a late substitute for Jadel Katongo in a 2–1 defeat to Rotherham United.

On 21 November 2025, Andrews joined National League North side Bedford Town on a one month loan.

On 28 February 2026, Andrews joined National League side Brackley Town on a one month loan.

On 14 August 2026, Andrews joined National League South side Chesham United on a one-month loan.

== International career ==
Andrews is a youth international for Wales, having represented the U17 side at the 2023 UEFA European Under-17 Championship, among various appearances in friendlies. He has also featured for the U19 side in double friendlies vs. Czechia U19 and Finland U19.
