= Petronius (horse) =

British-bred Thoroughbred racehorse

- Sire: Sir Peter Teazle
- Grandsire: Highflyer
- Dam: Louisa
- Damsire: Javelin
- Sex: Stallion
- Foaled: 1805
- Country: United Kingdom
- Colour: Bay
- Breeder: Archibald Hamilton, 9th Duke of Hamilton
- Owner: Archibald Hamilton, 9th Duke of Hamilton
- Trainer: William Theakston
- Record: 11: 5-2-3
- Earnings: £1653.75

Major wins
- St Leger Stakes (1808); Union Cup (1810)

Petronius (1805–1823) was a British Thoroughbred racehorse and sire best known for winning the classic St Leger Stakes in 1808. After winning the St Leger as a 20/1 outsider, Petronius remained in training for two more years, winning two races at York in 1809 and the Union Cup at Preston in 1810. He retired from racing after winning five races from eleven starts. He had little success as a breeding stallion and died in 1823 at the age of eighteen.

== Background ==
Petronius was a bay horse bred by his owner Archibald Hamilton, 9th Duke of Hamilton and was the fifth of the Duke's seven St Leger winners. His sire, Sir Peter Teazle (or simply "Sir Peter") won the Epsom Derby in 1787 and became the most successful stallion of the time, winning the title of Champion sire on ten occasions between 1799 and 1809.

== Racing career ==
=== 1808: three-year-old season ===
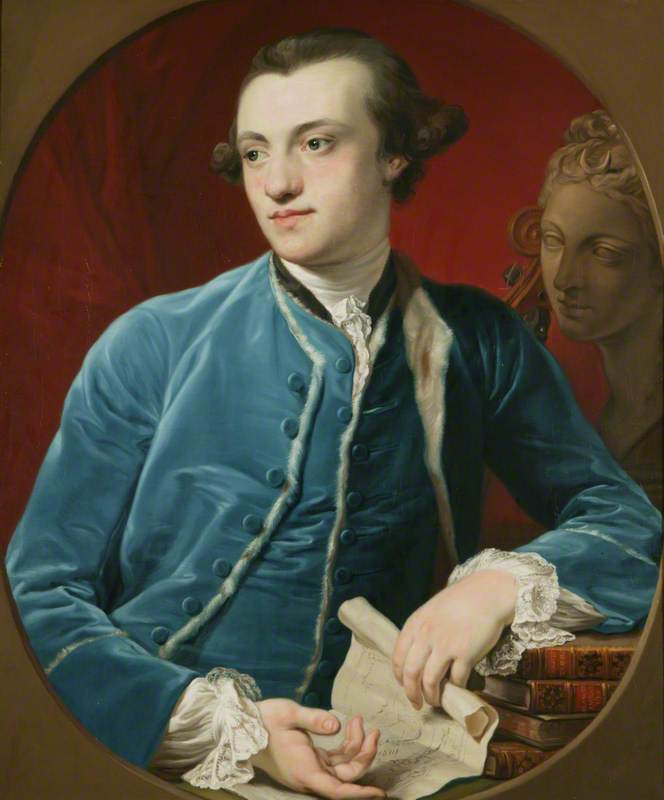
The Duke of Hamilton, who bred and owned Petronius

Unraced as a two-year-old, Petronius made his first appearance on a racecourse on 27 April 1808 at Skipton Racecourse. He started the 4/6 favourite and "won easy" from two opponents. Petronius' next race was the Union Cup, an all-aged race at Preston Racecourse on 13 July, when he finished third of the five runners behind Sir William Gerard's five-year-old Julius Caesar.

On 26 September, Petronius was one of fourteen colts and fillies to contest the thirty-third running of the St Leger at Doncaster. Ridden by Ben Smith, he started a 20/1 outsider, with Sir Mark Sykes' filly Theresa being made the 3/1 favourite. Petronius' long odds were partly explained by a rumour that he had thrown his jockey and eaten a great deal of clover shortly before the race. The closing stages of the classic were dominated by Petronius, Clinker (another colt sired by Sir Peter) and Lord Milton's Easton with Petronius prevailing after "a very good race".

Petronius ended his first season at Richmond on 12 October, when he contested a sweepstakes for three-year-olds. He finished second of the four runners behind Sir William Gerard's Pam, to whom he was conceding two pounds in weight. The finish of the race was close and controversial, leading to a "great dispute" regarding the judge's decision.

=== 1809: four-year-old season ===
Petronius began his second season at York on 29 May when he started at odds of 3/1 for a two-mile all-aged sweepstakes. After what was described as "a very good race", he won easily by one and a half lengths from Cardinal York and four others. At the next York meeting in August, Petronius had two engagements. He won a four-mile subscription race "cleverly" from the five-year-old mare Thomasina and three others before finishing third to Theresa in a division of the Great Subscription Purse over the same distance four days later.

On 14 September Petronius ran at Pontefract where he started 6/4 favourite for the Members Plate a race run in a series of heats, with the prize going to the first horse to win twice. Petronius won the first heat, but was beaten by the Duke of Leeds' horse Mowbray in the second and did not contest the deciding heat. Two weeks later, Petronius contested another race in two-mile heats at the Doncaster St Leger meeting. He finished fourth and second in the first two heats, and appeared to have won the third, but was disqualified on a technicality. After a horse race, the jockey is weighed, together with the saddle and bridle, to check that the correct weight has been carried: Petronius's bridle had been removed, and his jockey therefore weighed in at slightly less than the stipulated 119 pounds.

=== 1810: five-year-old season ===
On 18 July, Petronius began his final season by running in the Union Cup at Preston. Carrying top weight of 122 pounds, he started the 1/2 favourite and "won easy" from two opponents. In the following month, Petronius appeared at York for a division of the Great Subscription Purse. He started at odds of 7/2 and finished third of the four runners behind Mowbray and Whitworth after what was described by the Sporting Magazine as "one of the finest races ever run".

== Stud career ==
Petronius was retired to stud but appears to have made no impact as a sire of winners. His services were not advertised in the annual lists of stallions and only a few foals appear in the General Stud Book. Petronius died from inflammation of the lungs on 11 May 1823 at Marlefield, near Kelso in Scotland.

== Pedigree ==
Pedigree of Petronius (GB), bay stallion, 1805
Sire Sir Peter Teazle (GB) 1784	Highflyer; 1774	Herod	Tartar
Sire Sir Peter Teazle (GB) 1784	Highflyer; 1774	Herod	Cypron
Sire Sir Peter Teazle (GB) 1784	Highflyer; 1774	Rachel	Blank
Sire Sir Peter Teazle (GB) 1784	Highflyer; 1774	Rachel	Regulus mare
Sire Sir Peter Teazle (GB) 1784	Papillon; 1769	Snap	Snip
Sire Sir Peter Teazle (GB) 1784	Papillon; 1769	Snap	sister to Slipby
Sire Sir Peter Teazle (GB) 1784	Papillon; 1769	Miss Cleveland	Regulus
Sire Sir Peter Teazle (GB) 1784	Papillon; 1769	Miss Cleveland	Midge
Dam Louisa (GB) 1794	Javelin; 1772	Eclipse	Marske
Dam Louisa (GB) 1794	Javelin; 1772	Eclipse	Spilletta
Dam Louisa (GB) 1794	Javelin; 1772	Miss Rose	Spectator
Dam Louisa (GB) 1794	Javelin; 1772	Miss Rose	Blank mare
Dam Louisa (GB) 1794	Herod mare 1774	Herod	Tartar
Dam Louisa (GB) 1794	Herod mare 1774	Herod	Cypron
Dam Louisa (GB) 1794	Herod mare 1774	Snap mare	Snap
Dam Louisa (GB) 1794	Herod mare 1774	Snap mare	Crab mare (Family:15)

- Petronius was inbred 3 x 3 to Herod, meaning that this stallion appears twice in the third generation of his pedigree. He was also inbred 3 x 4 to Snap.
