= 1824 in sports =

1824 in sports describes the year's events in world sport.

== Boxing ==
Events

- 7 January and 8 June — Tom Spring twice defends his English title against the Irish challenger Jack Langan, the first bout taking place at Worcester and the second at Warwick. Both fights are very long and Spring wins them in the 77th and 76th round respectively. After the second fight, Spring announces his retirement from the ring.
- 23 June — the vacant English title is claimed by Tom Cannon after a 17-round victory over Josh Hudson.
- 23 November — Cannon's title is confirmed when he defeats Josh Hudson again, this time in the 16th round.

== Cricket ==
Events

- Gentlemen v Players is an odds game with 14 on the Gentlemen team, but the Players still win by 103 runs.

England

- Most runs – James Saunders 267 (HS 92)
- Most wickets – Thomas Flavel 31 (BB 7–?)

== Horse racing ==
England

- 1,000 Guineas Stakes – Cobweb
- 2,000 Guineas Stakes – Schahriar
- The Derby – Cedric
- The Oaks – Cobweb
- St. Leger Stakes – Jerry
