= Walton (horse) =

British Thoroughbred racehorse

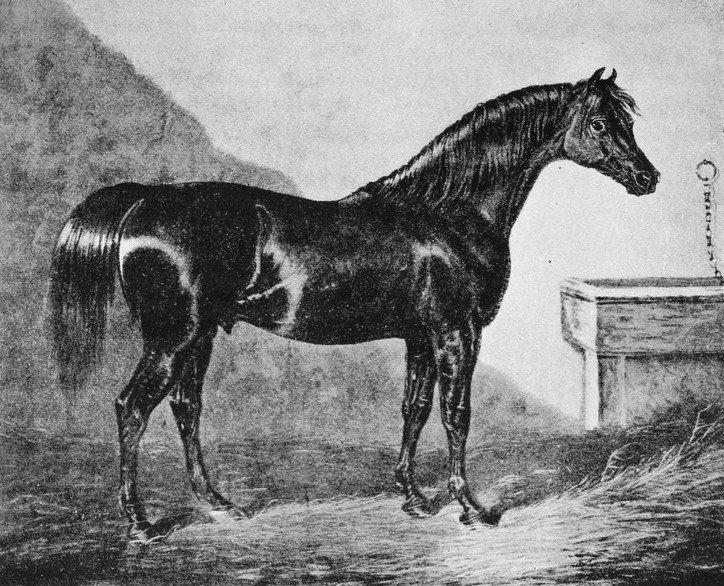
- Painting of Walton by John Frederick Herring
- Sire: Sir Peter Teazle
- Grandsire: Highflyer
- Dam: Arethusa
- Damsire: Dungannon
- Sex: Stallion
- Foaled: 1799
- Country: Great Britain
- Colour: Bay
- Breeder: Sir Hedworth Williamson
- Owner: Sir Hedworth Williamson
- Record: 25: 16-6-1
- Earnings: 1763 gs

Major wins
- Third Class Oatlands Stakes (1803); First October King's Plate (1803); First Spring King's Plate (1804, 1805); Guildford King's Plate (1804); Salisbury King's Plate (1804); Winchester King's Plate (1804); Warwick King's Plate (1804); Lichfield King's Plate (1804); Match against Penelope (1805) £50 Subscription at Newmarket(1805); Ladies Plate (1805)

Awards
- Champion sire of Great Britain (1816, 1818)

Walton (1799 – December 1825) was a British Thoroughbred racehorse. He raced until he was eight years old, winning sixteen of his twenty five races. His first race was in 1802, with his first big win, the Third Class of the Oatlands Stakes, coming in 1803. He went on to win eight King's Plates and recorded wins over several leading racehorses of the time. He was owned by Sir Hedworth Williamson throughout his racing career. Walton later became a successful stallion and was champion sire of Great Britain twice. He sired the Derby winner Phantom, 2000 Guineas winner Nectar and St. Leger winner St Patrick.

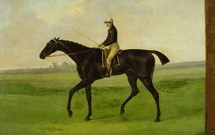
Walton's sire Sir Peter Teazle

== Background ==
Walton was a bay colt bred by Sir Hedworth Williamson and foaled in 1799. He was sired by Sir Peter Teazle, who won the Derby at Epsom in 1787. Sir Peter then went on to become a very successful stallion and was champion sire of Great Britain ten times. Amongst his other progeny were Derby winners Sir Harry, Archduke, Ditto and Paris, as well as six other Classic winners and the sire Haphazard. Walton's dam was Arethusa, a daughter of Dungannon. Walton was the fourth of Arethusa's thirteen foals, which included Derby winners Ditto (Walton's full brother) and Pan.

== Racing career ==
=== 1802: Three-year-old season ===
Walton, then unnamed, made his first racecourse appearance on 20 April 1802 at Newmarket, where he lost a sweepstakes of 100 guineas each to Pipylin. The following month, also at Newmarket, he finished unplaced in a £50 subscription plate, behind the winner - Lord Clermont's Whiskey colt. His only other start as a three-year-old was at Epsom on 4 June, when he faced four rivals in a race of three two-mile heats. After finishing third in the first heat, he won the remaining two to win the race. Dotterel finished in second place and Wilkes third.

=== 1803: Four-year-old season ===
Walton returned to the track on 13 April 1803 for the Third Class of the Oatlands Stakes at Newmarket. Priced at 7/2, Walton was the outsider of the three runners and was carrying less weight than either of his rivals. He won the race from Duxbury, with Eleanor in third. At the end of the month Walton beat Lignum Vitae over the two-mile Ditch-in course at Newmarket. At the York August Meeting, Walton started as the odds on favourite for a Handicap Sweepstakes over three miles. The race finished in a dead heat between Stockton and Walton, with Tankersley in third place. Stockton and Walton took part in a runoff, which the former won. In his next race, Walton beat Orlando and Allegranti to win the King's Plate over about four miles.

=== 1804: Five-year-old season ===
On 2 April 1804, the first day of the season, Walton finished second to Aniseed in the Craven Stakes at Newmarket. Third placed Eleanor was the only other of the seven other horses that could be placed by the judge. On 19 April, at the First Spring Meeting, he beat Duxbury and Slapband to win the King's Plate over the Round Course (about four miles). At Guildford in May he raced against Enchantress and Rumbo for the King's Plate, run in three four-mile heats. Walton, who was the favourite, won the first heat, but finished second to Enchantress in the second. Before the third heat (which only Walton and Enchantress took part in) Enchantress was the 2/5 favourite, but Walton took the victory to win the race. On 18 July at Salisbury he took part in the King's Plate in four-mile heats. Walton won both heats against his only rival Little Chance to win the race. He won another King's Plate in August, this time beating Mr. Frogley's colt in two four-mile heats at Winchester. In the next race he walked over for a sweepstakes of 10 guineas each. A month later he beat a John Bull filly in both of the four-mile heats to win the King's Plate at Warwick. On 11 September he beat three rivals to win the Lichfield King's Plate. At Newmarket's First October Meeting he finished last of the three runners in the King's Plate, behind winner Parasol and Sir Harry Dimsdale.

=== 1805: Six-year-old season ===
Walton again started his season in April, when he beat Penelope (who was carrying one pound more in weight) in a 200 guineas match over the Beacon Course. At the First Spring Meeting he started the odds-on favourite for a £50 Subscription over the Round Course. He won the race, beating runner-up Pipylin and third-placed Parasol. At the same meeting, two days later, he walked over for the King's Plate. On 15 May, at Newmarket's Second Spring Meeting, he finished second to Parasol in the Jockey-Club Plate, which was run over the distance of about four miles. Walton didn't race again until the end of July, when he contested the Somerset Stakes at Brighton. He started the race as the 5/2 second favourite and crossed the line in first place. However, Walton, along with second placed Houghton Lass and third placed Enterprize, were disqualified for taking the wrong course. This promoted Orville, who was last of the four finishers, into first place. On 2 August, Walton beat Brough to win the County Plate at Lewes. They next day he raced for the four-mile Ladies Plate. Starting as the favourite he won the race from Cardinal Beaufort, with Imposter finishing third and Enterprize last of the four runners. Walton ran again over four miles in the very next race, losing to Orville.

=== 1806: Seven-year-old season ===
Walton's only engagement in 1806 was a sweepstakes of 200 guineas each in April, but he paid a forfeit to Parasol and the race never took place.

=== 1807: Eight-year-old season ===
Walton's only race as an eight-year-old was the Craven Stakes on 30 March 1807, when he finished second to Selim, beating third placed Currycomb and eight others. He was then retired to stud and covered mares during 1807.

== Stud career ==
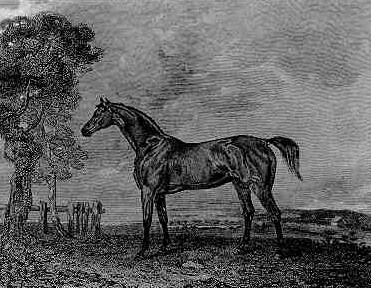
Walton's son Phantom

Walton first stood as a stallion at Mr. Perren's stables in Newmarket for a fee of 10 guineas and half a guinea for the groom. He later stood at several different places during his stud career, including Gipping-Hall near Stowmarket and the Grantham Arms in Boroughbridge, with his fee rising as high as 20 guineas. Walton immediately became a successful stallion. In 1810, the year the first of his offspring started racing, he sired 7 winners of 27 races, including Phantom winning the Derby. He became champion sire of Great Britain in 1816 and 1818 and his most notable progeny were:

- Phantom (1808) – was unbeaten as a three-year-old, including victories in the Derby and a match against the Oaks winner Morel. After retiring from racing he became a champion stallion, siring Derby winners Cedric and Middleton, and 2000 Guineas winners Enamel and Pindarrie. Phantom also sired the mare Cobweb who won the Oaks in 1824 and later became an influential broodmare.
- Rainbow (1808) – won the Claret Stakes as a four-year-old.
- Walton mare (1808) – foaled the 2000 Guineas winner Nicolo.
- Spotless (1809) – was the dam of Lamplighter, who won the Craven Stakes and was a good sire.
- Partisan (1811) – won several races at Newmarket and sired Derby winner Mameluke and champion sire Venison.
- Walton mare (1812) – foaled the Derby winner Cedric.
- Nectar (1813) – won the 2000 Guineas and Riddlesworth Stakes.
- Waterloo (1814) – won the Newmarket St. Leger.
- St Patrick (1817) – won the St. Leger.

Walton died in December 1825.

== Sire line tree ==
- Walton
  - Phantom
    - Cedric
    - Serab
    - Pindarrie
    - Enamel
    - Middleton
    - Glenartney
    - Taurus
      - Boeotian
      - Minotaurus
      - Turnus
      - Salem
  - Vandyke Junior
    - The Flyer
  - Rainbow
    - Giles
    - Hercule
    - Franck
  - Partisan
    - Godolphin
      - Mazeppa
    - Mameluke
    - Patron
      - Dover
      - Peter Simple
    - Glaucus
      - Palaemon
      - The Nob
        - The Nabob
      - Meridian
      - Equator
    - Berwickshire
    - Gladiator
      - Maccabeus
      - Napier
      - Prizefighter
      - Sweetmeat
        - Muscovado
        - Comquot
        - Plumb Pudding
        - Parmasan
        - Spicebox
        - Sweetsauce
        - Carnival
        - Macaroni
        - Saccharometer
        - Lozenge
      - Fitz Gladiator
        - Compiegne
        - Orphelin
        - Gontran
        - Vertugadin
        - Nicolet
        - Maubourget
      - Coustrainville
      - Brocoli
      - Ventre St Gris
        - Peut Etre
        - Ventriloque
      - Union Jack
    - Venison
      - Red Deer
      - The Ugly Buck
      - Alarm
        - Frantic
        - Grapeshot
        - Invasion
        - Kaffir
        - Winkfield
        - Aleppo
        - Middleton
        - Pitapat
        - Commotion
        - Fright
        - Sentinel
        - The Amorous Boy
        - Compromise
        - Telegram
        - Pax
        - Chelmsford
        - Orion
        - Panic
        - Stampedo
        - Peon
        - Suspicion
      - Roebuck
      - Sparshot
      - Petitioner
      - Coningsby
      - Repletion
      - Vatican
      - Cariboo
      - Cathedral
      - Marlborough Buck
      - Buckthorn
        - Herne
        - Glaneur
      - Filius
      - Kingston
        - Gladiolus
        - King-at-Arms
        - Hercules
        - Man-at-Arms
        - Caliban
        - Bedouin
        - Brighton
        - Caractacus
        - Earl of Surrey
        - Nottingham
        - Blue Mantle
        - Kingston
        - Kingswood
        - Ely
        - King John
        - Vagabond
      - Elcot
      - Cruiser
      - Tame Deer
  - Nectar
  - Waterloo
    - Grenadier
  - Arbutus
  - St Patrick
    - Birdcatcher
    - St Francis
    - Shamrock
    - Shillelagh

== Pedigree ==
Pedigree of Walton, bay stallion, 1799
Sire Sir Peter Teazle (GB) br. 1784	Highflyer (GB) b. 1774	Herod* b. 1758	Tartar
Sire Sir Peter Teazle (GB) br. 1784	Highflyer (GB) b. 1774	Herod* b. 1758	Cypron
Sire Sir Peter Teazle (GB) br. 1784	Highflyer (GB) b. 1774	Rachel; 1763	Blank
Sire Sir Peter Teazle (GB) br. 1784	Highflyer (GB) b. 1774	Rachel; 1763	Regulus mare*^
Sire Sir Peter Teazle (GB) br. 1784	Papillon (GB) br.1769	Snap* br. 1750	Snip
Sire Sir Peter Teazle (GB) br. 1784	Papillon (GB) br.1769	Snap* br. 1750	Fox mare
Sire Sir Peter Teazle (GB) br. 1784	Papillon (GB) br.1769	Miss Cleveland; 1758	Regulus*^
Sire Sir Peter Teazle (GB) br. 1784	Papillon (GB) br.1769	Miss Cleveland; 1758	Midge
Dam Arethusa (GB) ch. 1792	Dungannon (GB) b. 1780	Eclipse ch. 1764	Marske
Dam Arethusa (GB) ch. 1792	Dungannon (GB) b. 1780	Eclipse ch. 1764	Spilletta^
Dam Arethusa (GB) ch. 1792	Dungannon (GB) b. 1780	Aspasia; 1775	Herod*
Dam Arethusa (GB) ch. 1792	Dungannon (GB) b. 1780	Aspasia; 1775	Doris
Dam Arethusa (GB) ch. 1792	Prophet mare (GB) gr. 1777	Prophet ch. 1760	Regulus*^
Dam Arethusa (GB) ch. 1792	Prophet mare (GB) gr. 1777	Prophet ch. 1760	Jenny Spinner
Dam Arethusa (GB) ch. 1792	Prophet mare (GB) gr. 1777	Virago gr. 1764	Snap*
Dam Arethusa (GB) ch. 1792	Prophet mare (GB) gr. 1777	Virago gr. 1764	Regulus mare*^

Note: b. = Bay, br. = Brown, ch. = Chestnut, gr. = Grey

* Walton is inbred 3S x 4D to the stallion Herod, meaning that he appears third generation on the sire side of his pedigree and fourth generation on the dam side of his pedigree.

* Walton is inbred 3S x 4D to the stallion Snap, meaning that he appears third generation on the sire side of his pedigree and fourth generation on the dam side of his pedigree.

* Walton is inbred 4S x 4D to the mare Regulus mare, meaning that she appears fourth generation on the sire side of his pedigree and fourth generation on the dam side of his pedigree.

^ Walton is inbred 5S x 4S x 5D x 4D x 5D to the stallion Regulus, meaning that he appears fifth and fourth generation once each on the sire side of his pedigree and fifth generation twice and fourth generation once on the dam side of his pedigree.
