= 1820 in sports =

1820 in sports describes the year's events in world sport.

== Boxing ==
Events

- 1 February — Tom Cribb retains his English championship with a first-round knockout of Jack Carter in London.

== Cricket ==
Events

- William Ward scores 278 for MCC v. Norfolk at Lord's, the first known double century and a new world record for the highest individual innings in all forms of cricket, beating James Aylward's score of 167 in 1777. However, the match is not universally recognised as first-class.
- The original Northamptonshire CCC was founded in 1820 but was subject to substantial reorganisation and reformation in 1878
- Earliest mention of wicketkeeping gloves

England

- Most runs – William Ward 361 (HS 278)
- Most wickets – George Coles 17 (BB 6–?)

== Horse racing ==
England

- 1,000 Guineas Stakes – Rowena
- 2,000 Guineas Stakes – Pindarrie
- The Derby – Sailor
- The Oaks – Caroline
- St. Leger Stakes – St Patrick
