= Glaucus (horse) =

British Thoroughbred racehorse

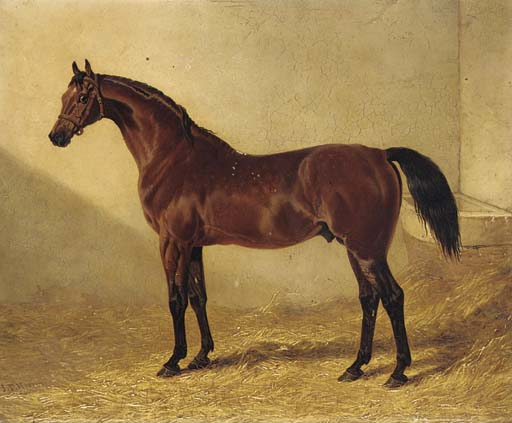
- Glaucus by John Frederick Herring Sr.
- Sire: Partisan
- Grandsire: Walton
- Dam: Nanine
- Damsire: Selim
- Sex: Stallion
- Foaled: 1830
- Country: Great Britain
- Colour: Bay
- Record: 19:11-4-0
- Last updated on 26 March 2024

Glaucus (1830 – 1847?) was a thoroughbred racehorse and sire in Great Britain and Germany.

== Background ==
Glaucus was a bay horse. His sire was Partisan, of which through his lineage continued the Walton branch of the Sir Peter Teazle direct sire line. His dam was Nanine.

== Racing career ==
Glaucus ran for five seasons, from 1832 to 1836. His major wins include the Gold Cup at Ascot, and the Goodwood Cup.

== Stud record ==
Glaucus produced two classic winners, both fillies (Pic-Nic and Refraction), both born in 1842. His son, The Nob, was a moderately successful racehorse. The Nob sired The Nabob, who was a successful sire of racehorses in France. Glaucus was sent to Germany to continue stud duty, but was not as successful.

Sire line descent tree
- Glaucus
  - Palaemon
  - The Nob
    - The Nabob
      - Bois Roussel
      - Vermout
        - Porphyre
        - Clotaire
        - Biovouac
        - Appollon
        - Boiard
        - Perplexe
        - Jonquille
        - Lusignan
        - Floristan
        - Vizier
      - Suzerain
  - Meridian
  - Equator

== Pedigree ==
Pedigree of Glaucus (GB), bay stallion, 1830
| Sire Partisan 1811 | Walton; 1799 | Sir Peter Teazle*; 1784 | Highflyer^ |
| Sire Partisan 1811 | Walton; 1799 | Sir Peter Teazle*; 1784 | Papillon |
| Sire Partisan 1811 | Walton; 1799 | Arethusa; 1792 | Dungannon |
| Sire Partisan 1811 | Walton; 1799 | Arethusa; 1792 | Prophet mare |
| Sire Partisan 1811 | Parasol; 1800 | Pot-8-Os; 1773 | Eclipse |
| Sire Partisan 1811 | Parasol; 1800 | Pot-8-Os; 1773 | Sportsmistress |
| Sire Partisan 1811 | Parasol; 1800 | Prunella; 1788 | Highflyer^ |
| Sire Partisan 1811 | Parasol; 1800 | Prunella; 1788 | Promise |
| Dam Nanine 1823 | Selim; 1802 | Buzzard; 1787 | Woodpecker |
| Dam Nanine 1823 | Selim; 1802 | Buzzard; 1787 | Misfortune |
| Dam Nanine 1823 | Selim; 1802 | Alexander mare 1790 | Alexander |
| Dam Nanine 1823 | Selim; 1802 | Alexander mare 1790 | Highflyer mare^ |
| Dam Nanine 1823 | Bizarre; 1811 | Peruvian; 1806 | Sir Peter Teazle*^ |
| Dam Nanine 1823 | Bizarre; 1811 | Peruvian; 1806 | Boudrow mare |
| Dam Nanine 1823 | Bizarre; 1811 | Violante; 1802 | John Bull |
| Dam Nanine 1823 | Bizarre; 1811 | Violante; 1802 | Skyscraper Sister by Highflyer^ |

* Glaucus is inbred 3S x 4D to the stallion Sir Peter Teazle, meaning that he appears third generation on the sire side of his pedigree and fourth generation on the dam side of his pedigree.

^ Glaucus is inbred 4S x 4S x 5D x 5D x 5D to the stallion Highflyer, meaning that he appears fourth generation twice on the sire side of his pedigree and fifth generation thrice (via Sir Peter Teazle, Highflyer mare, and Skyscraper Sister to Highflyer) on the dam side of his pedigree.
