= 1806 in sports =

1806 in sports describes the year's events in world sport.

== Boxing ==
Events

- Hen Pearce retains the English championship but no fights involving him are recorded in 1806.

== Cricket ==
Events

- The first two Gentlemen v Players matches take place but the fixture does not occur again until 1819.

England

- Most runs – William Lambert 276 (HS 64)
- Most wickets – Thomas Howard 21

== Horse racing ==
England

- The Derby – Paris
- The Oaks – Bronze
- St Leger Stakes – Fyldener
