= Sir Harry (British horse) =

British Thoroughbred racehorse

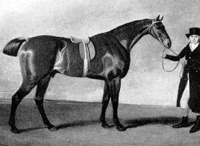
- Sir Harry. Contemporary painting.
- Sire: Sir Peter Teazle
- Grandsire: Highflyer
- Dam: Matron
- Damsire: Alfred
- Sex: Stallion
- Foaled: 1795
- Country: Kingdom of Great Britain
- Colour: Brown
- Breeder: Joseph Cookson
- Owner: Joseph Cookson; Mr Turnor; Mr Bullock; Mr Concannon
- Trainer: Frank Neale
- Record: 19:9-7-1

Major wins
- Epsom Derby (1798); Claret Stakes (1799); Match against Symmetry (1800); King's Plate at Lewes (1801)

Sir Harry (1795 – after 1816) was a British Thoroughbred racehorse and sire. In a career that lasted from May 1798 to August 1801 he ran nineteen times and won nine races. Lightly campaigned in his first two seasons he won Epsom Derby on his racecourse debut and the Claret Stakes at Newmarket in 1799. Sir Harry was much more active in his two remaining years, running fifteen times and winning seven more races including several match races and King's Plates. After his retirement from racing he was exported to the United States where he had a successful record at stud.

== Background ==
Sir Harry was a brown horse bred by his owner Joseph Cookson. He was the fifth Derby winner to be trained at Newmarket, Suffolk by Frank Neale. Sir Harry's sire, Sir Peter Teazle (or simply "Sir Peter") won the Epsom Derby in 1787 and became the most successful stallion of the time, winning the title of Champion sire on ten occasions between 1799 and 1809. Sir Harry made Sir Peter Teazle the first Derby winner to sire another winner of the race.

Sir Harry was the last of three foals produced by Matron, also known as Betsey. After having her first foal in 1789, Matron was trained for racing for two years and then used as a hunter for two further years until being returned to stud in 1794.

== Racing career ==
=== 1798: three-year-old season ===
Sir Harry made his first racecourse appearance in the Derby at Epsom on 24 May 1798. The race attracted thirty-seven entries, each paying fifty guineas, of which ten appeared to run in the race. Despite his lack of previous experience Sir Harry was made favourite at odds of 7/4. Ridden by Sam Arnull, he won from the 33/1 outsider Telegraph, with Young Spear third.

Sir Harry had only one other race in 1798, when he ran at Newmarket in October. He started second favourite for a Sweepstakes over ten furlongs ("Across the Flat")) and finished second of the four runners behind the favourite Admiral Nelson.

One source from late 1798 lists Sir Harry as the property of "Sir H. Hoghton", but this may be an error as Mr Cookson was listed as the colts owner for all his races from 1798 to 1800.

=== 1799: four-year-old season ===
In the Claret Stakes at Newmarket on 9 April Sir Harry was opposed by some of the previous year's best three-year-olds including the colts Admiral Nelson (the 6/4 favourite), Telegraph and Schedoni as well as the filly Bellissima, winner of The Oaks. Sir Harry started at odds of 8/1 and won the two mile race from Bellissima and with Telegraph third.

In August Sir Harry was walked 170 miles to compete in a four mile match race at York against the 1798 St Leger winner Symmetry in which he was scheduled to concede two pounds to his opponent. Very heavy rain turned the ground extremely soft and left parts of the course "knee deep" in mud and water. Sir Harry started 2/5 favourite but Symmetry coped better with the conditions to take the 500 guinea prize. A rematch was quickly arranged for the following spring at Newmarket

=== 1800: five-year-old season ===
After running only four times in the previous two years, Sir Harry ran four times in five weeks at Newmarket in the spring of 1800. On 14 April he was beaten in a 500 guinea match race over ten furlongs against Mr Baldock's horse Schedoni, to whom he was conceding half a pound. Two weeks later the rematch between Sir Harry and Symmetry was held over the two mile "Ditch In" course. On this occasion, Sir Harry carried half a pound less than his opponent and reversed the York form to win a prize of 200 guineas. Three days later Sir Harry reappeared for a Sweepstakes over the four Mile Duke's Course. He was made the 2/1 favourite and won from Lord Sackville's Laborie, the 1796 Oaks winner Parisot and two others. A third match against Symmetry, with Sir Harry conceding six pounds, had been scheduled for the next Newmarket meeting, but Mr Cookson withdrew his horse and paid a forfeit. At the same meeting on 17 May, Sir Harry ran a match against the Derby runner-up Telegraph over ten furlongs in which Sir Harry conceded seven pounds and ran a dead heat. There was no run-off, meaning that the 300 guinea stake was divided.

As in 1799, Sir Harry traveled to York in late summer, but had no success. On 26 August he carried top weight in the York Oatlands Stakes over two miles and finished last of the three runners behind Sir Harry Tempest-Vane's St Leger winner Cockfighter. On the following afternoon Sir Harry started 6/4 favourite for the Great Subscription Plate and finished last of the five runners over four miles.

On his last appearance of the season, Sir Harry returned to Newmarket for a Sweepstakes over the four mile Beacon Course. He was made 13/8 favourite and finished second of the six runners beaten by Mr Adams' horse Humbug.

=== 1801: six-year-old season ===
Sir Harry began his final season of racing in the ownership of a Mr Turnor. On 9 April he conceded at least ten pounds to his opponents in a race over the Duke's Course at Newmarket and won from Jack Andrews, Hippona and Telegraph. On his next start three days later, Sir Harry ran in the colours of Mr Bullock in a ten furlong Subscription Plate. Conceding at least twelve pounds to his seven opponents he finished second to Hornby Lass. On 22 April, running over the Round Course, Sir Harry finished second of the three runners to Sorceror in another subscription race. On his final start at Newmarket, Sir Harry ran over the sprint distance of six furlongs for a match race on 5 May. He took the prize money by defeating his familiar opponent Telegraph, to whom he was conceding seven pounds.

On 9 June Sir Harry competed in a Sweepstakes at Ascot which carried the condition that the winner must be offered for sale at 300 guineas. Sir Harry won the race from Wrangler and was duly bought by Mr Concannon, the owner of the runner-up. This was seen as an unfortunate result for Mr Bullock who had reportedly turned down an offer of 500 guineas for the horse on the previous day. Two weeks later, Sir Harry made his first appearance for his new owner in a King's Plate at Lewes where his opponents were Warter and Slapbang. In King's Plate races, horses carried heavy weights and raced in a series of four mile heats, with the prize going to the first horse to win twice. Sir Harry, carrying 168 pounds, finished last of the three runners behind Warter in the first heat, but then won the second. With Slapbang being withdrawn, the two winners then took part in deciding heat, which Sir Harry won to claim the prize, having galloped twelve miles in the course of the afternoon. Following this race, a match was arranged between Sir Harry and Warter on 7 August at Brighthelmston. Racing over one mile at level weights, Sir Harry started a slight favourite but was narrowly beaten by Lord Sackville's horse. The winning margin was so small that Concannon tried to claim a victory for Sir Harry before the official result was announced, creating "great confusion" among the racegoers. A week later, Sir Harry ran his last race in another King's Plate at Lewes. He finished second in the first heat and third in the second before being withdrawn. He was then retired to stud.

== Stud career ==
Sir Harry began his breeding career at Dennis O'Kelly's stud at Cannons, near Little Stanmore, Middlesex, where he stood at a fee of five guineas alongside the established stallions Dungannon and Volunteer. The most notable of his English offspring was an unnamed mare who produced The Oaks winner Medora. In 1804 he was sold to William Haxall and exported to the United States. He was based in Virginia until 1816 when he was moved to Samuel Griffith's stud in, Harford County, Maryland. He was a success at stud in America, siring the good winners Sir Alfred and Sir Hal and several important broodmares. '

== Pedigree ==
Pedigree of Sir Harry (GB), brown stallion, 1795
| Sire Sir Peter Teazle (GB) 1784 | Highflyer; 1774 | Herod | Tartar |
| Sire Sir Peter Teazle (GB) 1784 | Highflyer; 1774 | Herod | Cypron |
| Sire Sir Peter Teazle (GB) 1784 | Highflyer; 1774 | Rachel | Blank |
| Sire Sir Peter Teazle (GB) 1784 | Highflyer; 1774 | Rachel | Regulus mare*^ |
| Sire Sir Peter Teazle (GB) 1784 | Papillon; 1769 | Snap* | Snip |
| Sire Sir Peter Teazle (GB) 1784 | Papillon; 1769 | Snap* | sister to Slippy |
| Sire Sir Peter Teazle (GB) 1784 | Papillon; 1769 | Miss Cleveland | Regulus^ |
| Sire Sir Peter Teazle (GB) 1784 | Papillon; 1769 | Miss Cleveland | Midge |
| Dam Matron (GB) 1785 | Alfred; 1770 | Matchem | Cade |
| Dam Matron (GB) 1785 | Alfred; 1770 | Matchem | sister 2 to Miss Partner |
| Dam Matron (GB) 1785 | Alfred; 1770 | Snap mare | Snap* |
| Dam Matron (GB) 1785 | Alfred; 1770 | Snap mare | Diana |
| Dam Matron (GB) 1785 | Marske mare 1771 | Marske | Squirt |
| Dam Matron (GB) 1785 | Marske mare 1771 | Marske | The Ruby Mare |
| Dam Matron (GB) 1785 | Marske mare 1771 | Regulus mare*^ | Regulus^ |
| Dam Matron (GB) 1785 | Marske mare 1771 | Regulus mare*^ | Steady mare (Family:4-o) |

* Sir Harry is inbred 3S x 4D to the stallion Snap, meaning that he appears third generation on the sire side of his pedigree and fourth generation on the dam side of his pedigree.

* Sir Harry is inbred 4S x 3D to the mare Regulus mare, meaning that she appears fourth generation on the sire side of his pedigree and third generation on the dam side of his pedigree.

^ Sir Harry is inbred 5S x 4S x 4D to the stallion Regulus, meaning that he appears fifth and fourth generation once each on the sire side of his pedigree and fourth generation once on the dam side of his pedigree.

== Sire line tree ==
- Sir Harry
  - Sir Alfred
  - Sir Hal
  - Moses
