= Mameluke (British horse) =

British-bred Thoroughbred racehorse

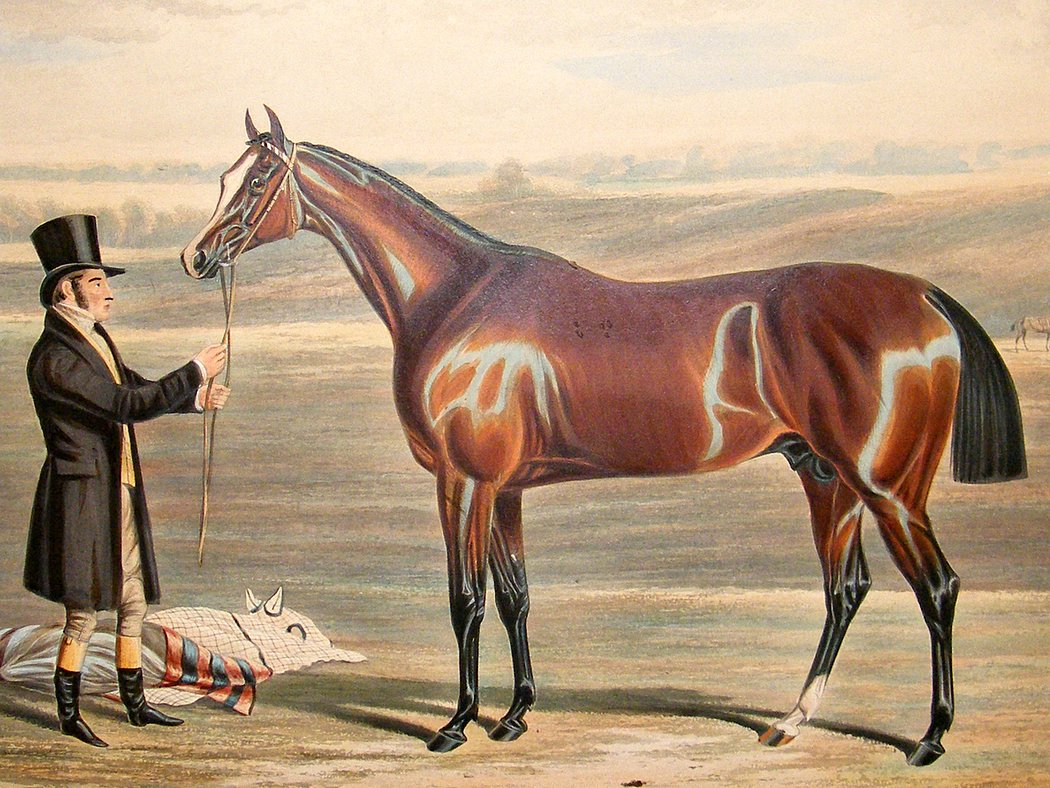
- Sire: Partisan
- Grandsire: Walton
- Dam: Miss Sophia
- Damsire: Stamford
- Sex: Stallion
- Foaled: 1824
- Country: United Kingdom of Great Britain and Ireland
- Colour: Bay
- Breeder: R. C. Elwes
- Owner: Lord Jersey; John Gully
- Trainer: James Edwards; Sykes
- Record: 13:7-3-0

Major wins
- Epsom Derby (1827); Port Stakes (1828)

Mameluke (1824 – 1849) was a British Thoroughbred racehorse and sire. In a career that lasted from April 1827 to October 1829 he ran thirteen times and won seven races. Unraced as a two-year-old, he proved himself to be one of the best colts of his generation in 1827 when he won The Derby and finished second in the St Leger. Both races were surrounded by allegations of race-fixing and corruption. Mameluke raced with some success at four and five before retiring to stud. He was not a great success as a stallion.

== Background ==
Mameluke was a "leggy and powerfully-quartered" bay colt with a white blaze and one white foot, bred in Northamptonshire by Mr R. C. Elwes He was bought as a yearling by Lord Jersey. Mameluke was sired by Partisan, one of the leading stallions of the time, whose other offspring included the Classic winners Patron (2000 Guineas), Cyprian (Epsom Oaks) and Zeal (1000 Guineas) as well as the successful sires Gladiator and Venison. Mameluke's dam, Miss Sophia, was a half-sister of the 1000 Guineas winner Charlotte.

== Racing career ==
=== 1827: three-year-old season ===
Mameluke's career began in controversy when he made his debut at Newmarket in April. He ran in the Riddlesworth Stakes, which at that time had a prestige almost equal to the Classics. Mameluke finished second to an unnamed filly by Partisan (later named Donna Maria), but the judge mistakenly awarded second place to his stable companion Glenartney, who was carrying the same colours. This error would have been unimportant if the winner had not then been disqualified for carrying the wrong weight. Glenartney, rather than Mameluke, was therefore credited as the official winner of the race. Mameluke was then able to take two valuable prizes without having to gallop for them. On 20 April he was allowed to walk over for a Sweepstakes at Newmarket when his opponents were withdrawn. He was next scheduled to take part in a match race on 30 April, but collected the £200 forfeit money without running when his opponent, a filly later named as "Mulebird" failed to appear.

Mameluke's next race was the Derby at Epsom, for which he started at odds of 9/1 and was ridden by James "Jemmy" Robinson. Glenartney was also in the field and started at 5/1 but Lord Jersey, who owned both colts, declined to announce a public preference for either and insisted that each horse would run on its merits. After three false starts the race got under way and Harry Edwards quickly sent Glenartney into the lead and set an extremely strong pace. With half a mile to run, most of the runners were struggling but Mameluke had moved easily into second place and the two Jersey colts raced into the straight clear of the rest of the field. After running alongside Glenartney as if taking part in an exercise gallop at home, Robinson sent Mameluke into the lead and he won comfortably, while Edwards seemed to make little effort to challenge him. It was widely believed that Glenartney had been "pulled" (deliberately restrained) by his jockey in the closing stages to allow his stable companion to win: it was known that Edwards had placed a large bet on Mameluke. Lord Jersey himself, despite his public statements, was suspected of involvement as he was also reported to have backed Mameluke heavily.

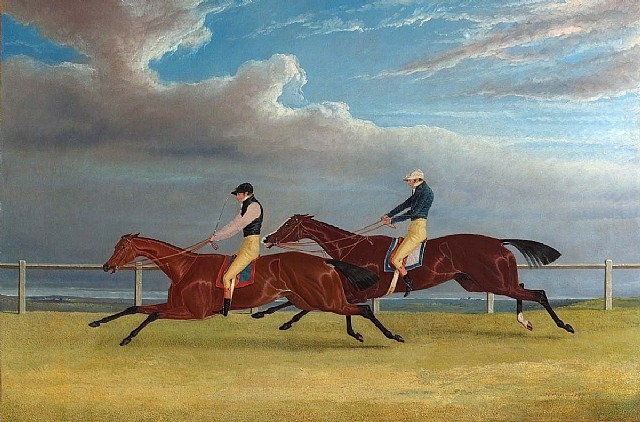
The 1827 St Leger: Matilda beats Mameluke.

Following the Derby, Mameluke was sold for 4,000 guineas to John Gully a former prize-fighter who had become a successful businessman and professional gambler. Gully, who moved the horse to the stable of a trainer named Sykes at Hambledon, aimed the horse for the St Leger at Doncaster and wagered heavily on his success. He reportedly stood to make more than £40,000 if the colt won, and the potential losers included unscrupulous gamblers and bookmakers such as Robert Ridsdale and William Crockford. At Doncaster, the start of the St Leger was chaotic with numerous false starts: according to one source there were twenty-seven of them and the race was run in near darkness. When the starter, Mr. Lockwood finally allowed the race to begin, a filly named Matilda was well in front of the other runners, while Mameluke, who had become increasingly upset by the situation and was facing in the wrong direction, was left at least sixty yards behind. Mameluke made up the ground but had to be taken round the outside of the field by his rider Sam Chifney as rival jockeys attempted to block him. He moved up to challenge the filly in the straight, but Matilda pulled ahead again and won by a length. It was later revealed that Lockwood, who was subsequently dismissed, had been bribed to engineer the start so as to ruin Mameluke's chances. It was also reported that several of the jockeys had been bribed to delay and disrupt the proceedings as much as possible. Gully attempted to recoup some of his losses by challenging Matilda's owners to a match race two days later, but his offer was declined.

A less cynical view of the 1827 St Leger was offered by Henry Hall Dixon ("The Druid") who suggested that the trouble at the start was caused by the large number of inexperienced and incompetent jockeys, and that Mameluke's defeat was primarily due to the poor conditioning he had received after his transfer to Sykes. A writer in The Sportsman on the other hand, laid the blame for Mameluke's defeat on Chifney for a lack of alertness at the start and poor judgement in making up the lost ground too quickly.

Despite his defeat at Doncaster, the Farmer's Magazine called Mameluke "beyond all question the best horse of his year".

=== 1828: four-year-old season ===
Mameluke reappeared as a four-year-old at the Craven meeting at Newmarket in April. He won the Oatlands Handicap on 8 April and then defeated Amphion in a two-runner race for the Port Stakes. For the second successive year at Newmarket's Second Spring meeting his owner was able to claim forfeit money for a match race, when his scheduled opponent, the 1826 Epsom Oaks winner Babel (formerly known as Lilias) was withdrawn. Mameluke's return to Doncaster in September ended in disappointment as he finished unplaced behind Laurel in the Doncaster Cup.

=== 1829: five-year-old season ===
On his first start of 1829, Mameluke beat the four-year-old Rough Robin by two lengths in a match race at Newmarket on 8 May and then ran well in defeat in his next two races. In June he came second to the favourite Zinganee in a very strong field for the Ascot Gold Cup, finishing ahead of the Classic winners Cadland (Derby), The Colonel (St Leger) and Green Mantle (Oaks). His jockey, Will Wheatley tracked the favourite throughout but Mameluke was unable to match Zinganee's acceleration in the straight and he was beaten two lengths. According to the leading sporting correspondent Ben Marshall, Mameluke's performance established him as the second-best horse in England. He then finished second to the filly Fleur de Lis, whom he had beaten at Ascot, in the Goodwood Cup in July. In this race he was considered a very unlucky loser after Wheatley temporarily lost his way in a thick fog.

In Autumn, Mameluke ran at Newmarket. At the second October meeting he was unplaced behind Lucetta in the Garden Stakes and then raced for The Whip, a four-mile challenge race for a trophy fashioned from the mane and tail of Eclipse. Mameluke captured The Whip for Gully by beating the six-year-old "holder", Lamplighter. On his final start on 26 October, Mameluke carried top weight to victory in a £100 Newmarket Handicap at the Houghton meeting.

== Stud career ==
At the end of his racing career, Gully sold Mameluke to William Theobald who based the stallion at his Stockwell stud in Surrey. Gully later attempted to buy the horse back, but Theobald refused. Mameluke made little impact as a stallion although some of his daughters had some influence as broodmares. At the end of 1837 it was reported that Mameluke had been sold to French breeders and was to be exported to stand as a stallion at Aurillac. He died in 1849 at age 25.

== Pedigree ==
Pedigree of Mameluke (GB), bay stallion, 1824
Sire Partisan(GB) 1811	Walton; 1799	Sir Peter Teazle*	Highflyer*
Sire Partisan(GB) 1811	Walton; 1799	Sir Peter Teazle*	Papillon*
Sire Partisan(GB) 1811	Walton; 1799	Arethusa	Dungannon
Sire Partisan(GB) 1811	Walton; 1799	Arethusa	Prophet mare
Sire Partisan(GB) 1811	Parasol; 1800	Potoooooooo	Eclipse*
Sire Partisan(GB) 1811	Parasol; 1800	Potoooooooo	Sportsmistress
Sire Partisan(GB) 1811	Parasol; 1800	Prunella	Highflyer*
Sire Partisan(GB) 1811	Parasol; 1800	Prunella	Promise
Dam Miss Sophia (GB) 1805	Stamford; 1794	Sir Peter Teazle*	Highflyer*
Dam Miss Sophia (GB) 1805	Stamford; 1794	Sir Peter Teazle*	Papillon*
Dam Miss Sophia (GB) 1805	Stamford; 1794	Horatia	Eclipse*
Dam Miss Sophia (GB) 1805	Stamford; 1794	Horatia	Countess
Dam Miss Sophia (GB) 1805	Sophia; 1798	Buzzard	Woodpecker
Dam Miss Sophia (GB) 1805	Sophia; 1798	Buzzard	Misfortune
Dam Miss Sophia (GB) 1805	Sophia; 1798	Huncamunca	Highflyer*
Dam Miss Sophia (GB) 1805	Sophia; 1798	Huncamunca	Cypher (Family:3-b)

* Mameluke is inbred 3S x 3D to the stallion Sir Peter Teazle, meaning that he appears third generation on the sire side of his pedigree and third generation on the dam side of his pedigree.

* Mameluke is inbred 4S x 4S x 4D x 4D to the stallion Highflyer, meaning that he appears fourth generation twice on the sire side of his pedigree and fourth generation twice on the dam side of his pedigree.

* Mameluke is inbred 4S x 4D to the stallion Eclipse, meaning that he appears fourth generation on the sire side of his pedigree and fourth generation on the dam side of his pedigree.
