= Pan (horse) =

British-bred Thoroughbred racehorse

- Sire: St. George
- Grandsire: Highflyer
- Dam: Arethusa
- Damsire: Dungannon
- Sex: Stallion
- Foaled: 1805
- Country: United Kingdom of Great Britain and Ireland
- Colour: Chestnut
- Breeder: Sir Hedworth Williamson
- Owner: Sir Hedworth Williamson; Mr Bouverie; Lord Sackville; Mr Stephenson; Mr Mitford; Mr Weston
- Trainer: J. Lonsdale
- Record: 20:9-8-0

Major wins
- Epsom Derby (1808); Cheveley Stakes (1811); Matches against Harpocrates, Tumbler, Morel

Pan (1805 – circa 1822) was a British Thoroughbred racehorse and sire. In a career that lasted from June 1808 to July 1814 he had six different owners, ran twenty times and won nine races. His most important success came on his only appearance as a three-year-old in 1808 when he won the Derby as a 25/1 outsider. Pan won another eight races over the next four seasons, running mainly in match races at Newmarket. He raced for two more years without success before being retired as a nine-year-old in 1814.

== Background ==
Pan's dam Arethusa, who was bred by the Prince of Wales, was one of the most successful broodmares of her era: apart from Pan she produced the leading stallion Walton the Derby winner Ditto and the Ascot Gold Cup winner Lutzen. Pan's sire St. George finished fifth in the 1792 Derby and raced up to the age of ten, winning many matches and Plate races. Pan was his most successful offspring. Pan was owned in his early racing career by his breeder, Sir Hedworth Williamson of Whitburn, near Sunderland.

== Racing career ==
=== 1808: three-year-old season ===
Unraced as a two-year-old, Pan made his one and only appearance of 1808 in the Derby at Epsom on 2 June. Ridden by Frank Collinson, a "cunning Yorkshireman", he was a 20/1 and 25/1 outsider for the race, with the Duke of Grafton's colt Vandyke starting 9/4 favourite in a field of ten runners. In the straight, Vandyke moved to the front and after a "severe" struggle with Clinker and Rubens, looked the likely winner. Collinson however, produced Pan with a strong late run to catch the leaders inside the final furlong and win by half a length. It appeared that Vandyke's jockey had failed to notice the challenge of the outsider until it was too late for his colt to respond. The race was considered one of the finest Derbies ever run. After the race, the owners of the second, third and fourth placed horses all challenged the winner to match races, but Sir Hedworth did not accept.

=== 1809: four-year-old season ===
For the next three seasons, Pan raced exclusively at Newmarket. On 17 April Pan raced for the first time in more than ten months when he started 11/10 favourite a four-mile Sweepstakes at Newmarket. The race brought together the first three horses from the 1808 Derby, and the result was a repeat of the Epsom Classic, with Pan, ridden by Frank Buckle prevailing from Vandyke and Chester.

Pan's second win was followed by another long break before he reappeared for the autumn meetings at Newmarket. He carried 144 pounds in a King's Plate on 5 October and finished second of the four runners to Vandyke. He was withdrawn from the Oatlands Stakes on 20 October before starting 6/4 favourite for a Subscription Plate on 1 November at the Houghton meeting. He finished second of the ten runners in the two-mile race to the five-year-old mare Nymphina, to whom he was conceding eleven pounds.

=== 1810: five-year-old season ===
The death of Sir Hedworth Williamson in March led to the sale of all his horses and Pan was bought for 1,350 guineas by a Mr Bouverie. On 7 May he ran in a match race against Mr Shakespear's horse Tumbler, with Bouverie wagering 300 guineas against Shakespear's 200. Pan was beaten in the match, in which he carried seven pounds more than his opponent. He was then sold to Lord Sackville, in whose colours he ran for the next three years.

In October, Pan was entered in a series of five match races against Mr Shakespear's Harpocrates. Each race was to be run over ten furlongs ("across the flat") and carried a prize of 100 guineas. Pan won the first match, receiving seven pounds from Harpocrates on 2 October, and the second at level weights two days later. At this point, Shakespear conceded defeat and withdrew Harpocrates from the remaining matches, agreeing to pay a forfeit of 60 guineas for each race. On his only other start of the season, Pan was beaten by Lord Grosvenor's six-year-old Eaton in a ten furlong Subscription Plate on 15 October.

=== 1811: six-year-old season ===
Pan began 1811 with a rematch against Tumbler at Newmarket on 18 April. The conditions of this occasion saw him receiving seven pounds from Shakespear's horse and he won to claim the 500 guinea prize. Two weeks later sustained his only defeat of the year when he was beaten in a two-mile match in which he attempted to concede three pounds to Lord Oxford's mare Victoria for a prize of 200 guineas. On 27 June, Pan "raced" away from Newmarket for the first time since his Derby win more than three years earlier. At the Bibury Club meeting he was allowed to canter around the three-mile course unopposed for a 100 guinea Plate when the entries of the other horses were withdrawn.

Pan had three engagements at Newmarket in autumn. On 1 October he beat the filly Antelope in a 100 guinea match over the six furlong Two Year Old Course. At the next meeting, Lord Sackville was able to claim 100 guineas without running Pan, when Major Wilson withdrew his colt Juniper from a scheduled two-mile match. Pan ended his most successful season by starting 7/4 favourite and beating four opponents in the ten furlong Cheveley Stakes on 30 October.

=== 1812: seven-year-old season ===
At Newmarket on 17 April, ran a match against the seven-year-old mare Morel, the winner of the 1808 Epsom Oaks. Receiving six pounds from his opponent, Pan started the 2/7 favourite and defeated the mare over the Abingdon Mile to claim the 200 guinea prize.

On his only other start of the year, Pan was matched against the 1810 Derby winner Whalebone for 200 guineas over four miles on 29 October. He sustained his first defeat for almost eighteen months as he failed to concede five pounds to the younger horse.

=== 1813–1814: later career ===
In his last two years of racing Pan passed between various owners as the level of his form deteriorated. On 3 May 1813 he finished last of the five runners behind Sir Charles Bunbury's Rival in a three-mile Subscription Plate. He was then sold to a Mr Stephenson, in whose colours he finished unplaced behind Aquarius in a race on 13 July.

Pan was off the course for more than a year, and became the property of a Mr Mitford, before he ran at Goodwood in July 1814. He finished second in both heats of the Goodwood Club Stakes, won by Mr Newnham's gelding Cambrian and ran again later the same day in the Ladies' Plate. In this race he was beaten in two heats by Albany, a four-year-old gelding to whom he was attempting to concede twenty-nine pounds. Pan changed owners again and ran for Mr Weston on his final racecourse appearance in which finished well beaten by a six-year-old horse named Beverley in both heats of a race at Basingstoke on 17 September.

== Stud career ==
Pan began his stud career at the age of ten in 1815. He stood as a stallion at Lilley, in Hertfordshire at a fee of 5 guineas and five shillings for the groom. Pan does not appear to have been a great success at stud: he sired a few registered foals, the last of which was born in 1822.

== Pedigree ==
Pedigree of Pan (GB), chestnut stallion, 1805
Sire St. George (GB) 1789	Highflyer; 1774	Herod*	Tartar
Sire St. George (GB) 1789	Highflyer; 1774	Herod*	Cypron
Sire St. George (GB) 1789	Highflyer; 1774	Rachel	Blank
Sire St. George (GB) 1789	Highflyer; 1774	Rachel	Regulus mare*^
Sire St. George (GB) 1789	Eclipse mare 1775	Eclipse*	Marske*
Sire St. George (GB) 1789	Eclipse mare 1775	Eclipse*	Spilletta*^
Sire St. George (GB) 1789	Eclipse mare 1775	Miss Spindleshanks	Omar
Sire St. George (GB) 1789	Eclipse mare 1775	Miss Spindleshanks	Starling mare
Dam Arethusa (GB) 1792	Dungannon; 1780	Eclipse*	Marske*
Dam Arethusa (GB) 1792	Dungannon; 1780	Eclipse*	Spilletta*
Dam Arethusa (GB) 1792	Dungannon; 1780	Aspasia	Herod*
Dam Arethusa (GB) 1792	Dungannon; 1780	Aspasia	Doris
Dam Arethusa (GB) 1792	Prophet mare 1777	Prophet	Regulus^
Dam Arethusa (GB) 1792	Prophet mare 1777	Prophet	Jenny Spinner
Dam Arethusa (GB) 1792	Prophet mare 1777	Virago	Snap
Dam Arethusa (GB) 1792	Prophet mare 1777	Virago	Regulus mare*^ (Family:7)

* Pan is inbred 3S x 3D to the stallion Eclipse, meaning that he appears third generation on the sire side of his pedigree and third generation on the dam side of his pedigree.

* Pan is inbred 3S x 4D to the stallion Herod, meaning that he appears third generation on the sire side of his pedigree and fourth generation on the dam side of his pedigree.

* Pan is inbred 4S x 4D to the mare Regulus mare, meaning that she appears fourth generation on the sire side of his pedigree and fourth generation on the dam side of his pedigree.

^ Pan is inbred 5S x 5S x 4D x 5D to the stallion Regulus, meaning that he appears fifth generation twice on the sire side of his pedigree, as well as fourth and fifth generation once each on the dam side of his pedigree.
