= Phantom (horse) =

British-bred Thoroughbred racehorse

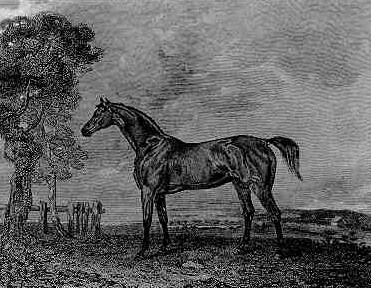
- Phantom. Contemporary engraving. Possibly based on painting by James Ward
- Sire: Walton
- Grandsire: Sir Peter Teazle
- Dam: Julia
- Damsire: Whiskey
- Sex: Stallion
- Foaled: 1808
- Country: United Kingdom of Great Britain and Ireland
- Colour: Bay
- Breeder: Sir John Shelley, 6th Baronet
- Owner: Sir John Shelley
- Trainer: James Edwards
- Record: 10:7-3-0

Major wins
- Epsom Derby (1811)

Phantom (1808 – 1834) was a British Thoroughbred racehorse and sire. In a career that lasted from April 1811 to April 1813 he ran ten times and won seven races. In the summer of 1811 he proved himself one of the best British colts of his generation, winning the Derby on his second racecourse appearance. He continued to race with considerable success for two more years, mainly in match races. He was retired to stud in 1814 and became a successful sire of winners before being exported to Mecklenburg in 1832.

== Background ==
Phantom was a bay horse bred at Maresfield in Sussex by his owner Sir John Shelley, a distant relative of the poet Percy Bysshe Shelley. He was from the first crop of foals sired by Walton, a stallion bought by Shelley in 1804 and based at Boroughbridge in Yorkshire at the time of Phantom's conception. Walton won several King's Plates in his racing career and was successful as a sire of winners. Apart from Phantom, he sired the classic winners St Patrick (St. Leger Stakes) and Nectar (2000 Guineas). Phantom's dam Julia was a sister of the 1801 Derby winner Eleanor.

== Racing career ==
=== 1811: three-year-old season ===
Phantom did not run as a two-year-old and made his first appearance in a Produce Sweepstakes on 15 April at Newmarket. He started favourite at odds of 1/3 but was beaten, finishing second to the filly Barrosa. Two weeks later, Barrosa finished second to the colt Trophonius in the 2000 Guineas.

On 30 May Phantom, ridden by Frank Buckle started at odds of 5/1 for the Derby in a field of sixteen runners, with the 2000 Guineas winner Trophonius being made 3/1 favourite. The early leaders were Wellington and an unnamed "Bangtail colt" who set a "very severe" pace from the start until halfway up the straight. Inside the last two furlongs Magic, the 7/1 third favourite ridden by Tom Carr, took the lead and Buckle produced Phantom with his challenge. In a "desperate" finish, Phantom caught Magic in the "very last stride" to win by a head, with Buckle riding "in his usual style of excellence." Shelley took a reported £9,000 in winning bets, a "marvellous" sum for the time.

At Ascot on 11 June Phantom ran in a one-mile Sweepstakes. He conceded five pounds in weight to two opponents and won by a neck from Wellington at odds of 4/7. Three days later at the same meeting, Shelley claimed 200 guineas when a colt by Giles was withdrawn from a scheduled match race against Phantom.

At the autumn meetings at Newmarket, Phantom was entered in a series of match races. At the Second October meeting Phantom was withdrawn from a match against Tumbler but raced against Truffle on 19 October. Starting 2/5 favourite, Phantom defeated Truffle very easily at level weights in a race "across the flat" (one and a quarter miles) to win a prize of 200 guineas. At the Newmarket Houghton meeting, Phantom had four engagements and ran twice, after being withdrawn from the Garden Stakes on the opening day. On 30 October he received ten pounds in weight from the six-year-old mare Morel, the 1808 Epsom Oaks winner, and defeated her "quite easy" in a 200 guinea match over the Abingdon Mile course. Later the same afternoon, Jolter, Phantom's scheduled opponent for a second match race was withdrawn, enabling Shelley to collect a further 200 guineas without running his colt. On the last day of the meeting, Phantom raced in a match for 500 guineas across the flat against the four-year-old Oporto. Phantom started the 1/3 favourite and successfully conceded ten pounds to his older rival.

Phantom's earnings for the season totalled £3,000.

=== 1812: four-year-old season ===
On 2 April, Shelley collected 80 guineas from Sir Charles Bunbury when a match race between Phantom and Bunbury's Sorcerer colt was cancelled. In his first competitive race of 1812, Phantom finished second to Rainbow (also known as "General Gower's colt") at level weights in the Claret Stakes at Newmarket on 14 April, a race for which he started 2/5 favourite. Two weeks later at the same course, he won a 200 guineas match race against the five-year-old Crispin who attempted to concede eight pounds to the Derby winner. Four days later, a match between Phantom and Beverley did not take place, with Shelley claiming 300 guineas in forfeit money.

Phantom failed to appear for a match races against Graymalkin on 28 September, Sorcery on 12 October and Elizabeth on 26 October so that by the time of his only other race of the year he had been off the racecourse for six months. At the Newmarket Houghton meeting on 31 October he conceded seven pounds to the five-year-old Eccleston and won a match race for 300 guineas.

=== 1813: five-year-old season ===
Phantom ran only once as a five-year-old. On 19 April, the opening day of the Newmarket Craven meeting, he was beaten at level weights by Soothsayer in a 500 guinea match race. A scheduled match against Lady of the Lake at Newmarket in October did not take place, with Shelley paying 90 guineas forfeit. In the summer of 1813 a painting of Phantom by James Ward R. A. was part of an exhibition of sporting subjects at the Royal Academy, and was considered one of the artist's more successful equine portraits.

== Stud career ==
Phantom was retired to stand at the Royal Stud at Hampton Court, at an initial fee of 10 guineas and a guinea for the groom. By 1821 he was standing at Newmarket at a fee of 12 guineas. His last appearance in the list of British-based stallions was at the end of 1831, when he was advertised as covering for the following season at 5 guineas. In 1832, at the advanced age of twenty-four, Phantom was sold and exported to Mecklenburg. Phantom's progeny included the Derby winners Cedric and Middleton and the 2000 Guineas winners Enamel and Pindarrie. His most influential offspring was the filly Cobweb who won the 1824 Epsom Oaks and went on to produce the Derby and St Leger winner Bay Middleton. She was also the direct female ancestor of the Derby winners Humorist and Royal Palace and the Kentucky Derby winner Spend A Buck. Phantom was Leading sire in Great Britain and Ireland in 1820 and 1824. Phantom died in 1834 before the breeding season.

== Sire line tree ==
- Phantom
  - Cedric
  - Serab
  - Pindarrie
  - Enamel
  - Middleton
  - Glenartney
  - Taurus
    - Boeotian
    - Minotaurus
    - Turnus
    - Salem

== Pedigree ==
Pedigree of Phantom (GB), bay stallion, 1808
Sire Walton (GB) 1799	Sir Peter Teazle; 1784	Highflyer	Herod*
Sire Walton (GB) 1799	Sir Peter Teazle; 1784	Highflyer	Rachel
Sire Walton (GB) 1799	Sir Peter Teazle; 1784	Papillon	Snap
Sire Walton (GB) 1799	Sir Peter Teazle; 1784	Papillon	Miss Cleveland
Sire Walton (GB) 1799	Arethusa; 1792	Dungannon	Eclipse*
Sire Walton (GB) 1799	Arethusa; 1792	Dungannon	Aspasia
Sire Walton (GB) 1799	Arethusa; 1792	Prophet mare	Prophet
Sire Walton (GB) 1799	Arethusa; 1792	Prophet mare	Virago*
Dam Julia (GB) 1799	Whiskey; 1789	Saltram	Eclipse*
Dam Julia (GB) 1799	Whiskey; 1789	Saltram	Virago*
Dam Julia (GB) 1799	Whiskey; 1789	Calash	Herod*
Dam Julia (GB) 1799	Whiskey; 1789	Calash	Teresa
Dam Julia (GB) 1799	Young Giantess; 1790	Diomed	Florizel
Dam Julia (GB) 1799	Young Giantess; 1790	Diomed	sister to Juno
Dam Julia (GB) 1799	Young Giantess; 1790	Giantess	Matchem
Dam Julia (GB) 1799	Young Giantess; 1790	Giantess	Molly Longlegs (Family:6-a)

* Phantom is inbred 4S x 4D to the stallion Herod, meaning that he appears fourth generation on the sire side of his pedigree and fourth generation on the dam side of his pedigree.

* Phantom is inbred 4S x 4D to the stallion Eclipse, meaning that he appears fourth generation on the sire side of his pedigree and fourth generation on the dam side of his pedigree.

* Phantom is inbred 4S x 4D to the mare Virago, meaning that she appears fourth generation on the sire side of his pedigree and fourth generation on the dam side of his pedigree.
