= Archduke (horse) =

British Thoroughbred racehorse

- Sire: Sir Peter Teazle
- Grandsire: Highflyer
- Dam: Horatia
- Damsire: Eclipse
- Sex: Stallion
- Foaled: 1796
- Country: Kingdom of Great Britain
- Colour: Brown
- Breeder: Sir Frank Standish
- Owner: Sir Frank Standish
- Trainer: Richard Prince
- Record: 4:2-0-2

Major wins
- Epsom Derby (1799)

Archduke (1796 – after 1814) was a British Thoroughbred racehorse and sire. In a career that lasted from April to October 1799 he ran four times and won two races. On his second racecourse appearance he won The Derby defeating his more fancied stable companion, Eagle. Archduke was beaten in two races at Newmarket later that year and did not race again. He was later exported to stand at stud in the United States.

== Background ==
Archduke was a brown horse bred by his owner Sir Frank Standish of Duxbury. Archduke's sire, Sir Peter Teazle (or simply "Sir Peter") won the Epsom Derby in 1787 and became the most successful stallion of the time, winning the title of Champion sire on ten occasions between 1799 and 1809. Archduke was the tenth foal of Horatia, a highly successful broodmare, who had previously produced the double Doncaster Cup winner Stamford and went on to produce the 1806 Derby winner Paris, both sired by Sir Peter .

== Racing career ==
=== 1799: three-year-old season ===
Until 1946 British racehorses did not have to be given an official name when racing and the colt who later became Archduke was unnamed for his debut on 10 April 1799. Running as "Sir F. Standish's c. by Sir Peter out of Horatia", he ran in a 100 guinea Sweepstakes at the Newmarket Craven meeting. He was made 6/4 favourite and won from Lord Grosvenor's John Bull filly and two others.

The colt was officially named Archduke when he appeared at Epsom for the Derby on 9 May. His stable companion, Sir Frank Standish's "Brother to Spread Eagle" (later named Eagle) was the even money favourite, while Archduke was a relative outsider at odds of 12/1 in a field of eleven runners. Ridden by the veteran jockey John Arnull, Archduke won from Lord Egremont's Precipitate colt, with Eagle only third and Vivaldi fourth. The result was similar to the 1796 race, in which Standish's Didelot won the race with his favoured stablemate Mr. Teazle unplaced.

After a break of well over four months, Archduke returned for the autumn meetings at Newmarket, where he had three engagements. On 30 September he started favourite for a Sweepstakes over the two mile "Ditch In" course, but finished third of the four runners behind Chippenham and Buzzard. Eagle finished last. Two days later, Archduke ran in the Town Plate over the same course and finished last of the three runners behind Hornby Lass and Humbug. This proved to be his last racecourse appearance: he was withdrawn from a valuable Sweepstakes on 14 October (won by Eagle), and from a scheduled match race against Mr Heathcote's horse Schedoni at Newmarket the following April.

== Stud career ==
After two seasons at stud in England, Archduke was sold in 1803 to John Hoomes and exported to stand as a stallion in Virginia. Before he was exported he sired Roseden, who became a successful sire in Ireland. After the death of Hoomes in 1805, Archduke was sold and stood in 1807 in Chesterfield County, Virginia for Thomas Branch.

== Pedigree ==
Pedigree of Archduke (GB), brown stallion, 1796
Sire Sir Peter Teazle (GB) 1784	Highflyer; 1774	Herod	Tartar
Sire Sir Peter Teazle (GB) 1784	Highflyer; 1774	Herod	Cypron
Sire Sir Peter Teazle (GB) 1784	Highflyer; 1774	Rachel	Blank*~
Sire Sir Peter Teazle (GB) 1784	Highflyer; 1774	Rachel	Regulus mare^~
Sire Sir Peter Teazle (GB) 1784	Papillon; 1769	Snap	Snip
Sire Sir Peter Teazle (GB) 1784	Papillon; 1769	Snap	sister to Slippy
Sire Sir Peter Teazle (GB) 1784	Papillon; 1769	Miss Cleveland	Regulus^~
Sire Sir Peter Teazle (GB) 1784	Papillon; 1769	Miss Cleveland	Midge
Dam Horatia (GB) 1778	Eclipse; 1764	Marske	Squirt
Dam Horatia (GB) 1778	Eclipse; 1764	Marske	The Ruby mare
Dam Horatia (GB) 1778	Eclipse; 1764	Spilletta	Regulus^~
Dam Horatia (GB) 1778	Eclipse; 1764	Spilletta	Mother Western
Dam Horatia (GB) 1778	Countess; 1760	Blank*	Godolphin Arabian~
Dam Horatia (GB) 1778	Countess; 1760	Blank*	Amorett
Dam Horatia (GB) 1778	Countess; 1760	Rib mare	Rib
Dam Horatia (GB) 1778	Countess; 1760	Rib mare	Wynn Arabian mare (Family:30)

* Archduke is inbred 4S x 3D to the stallion Blank, meaning that he appears fourth generation on the sire side of his pedigree and third generation on the dam side of his pedigree.

^ Archduke is inbred 5S x 4S x 4D to the stallion Regulus, meaning that he appears fifth and fourth generation once each on the sire side of his pedigree and fourth generation once on the dam side of his pedigree.

~ Archduke is inbred 5S x 6S x 5S x 5D x 4D to the stallion Godolphin Arabian, meaning that he appears fifth generation twice and sixth generation once on the sire side of his pedigree and fifth and fourth generation once each on the dam side of his pedigree.
