= Escape (horse) =

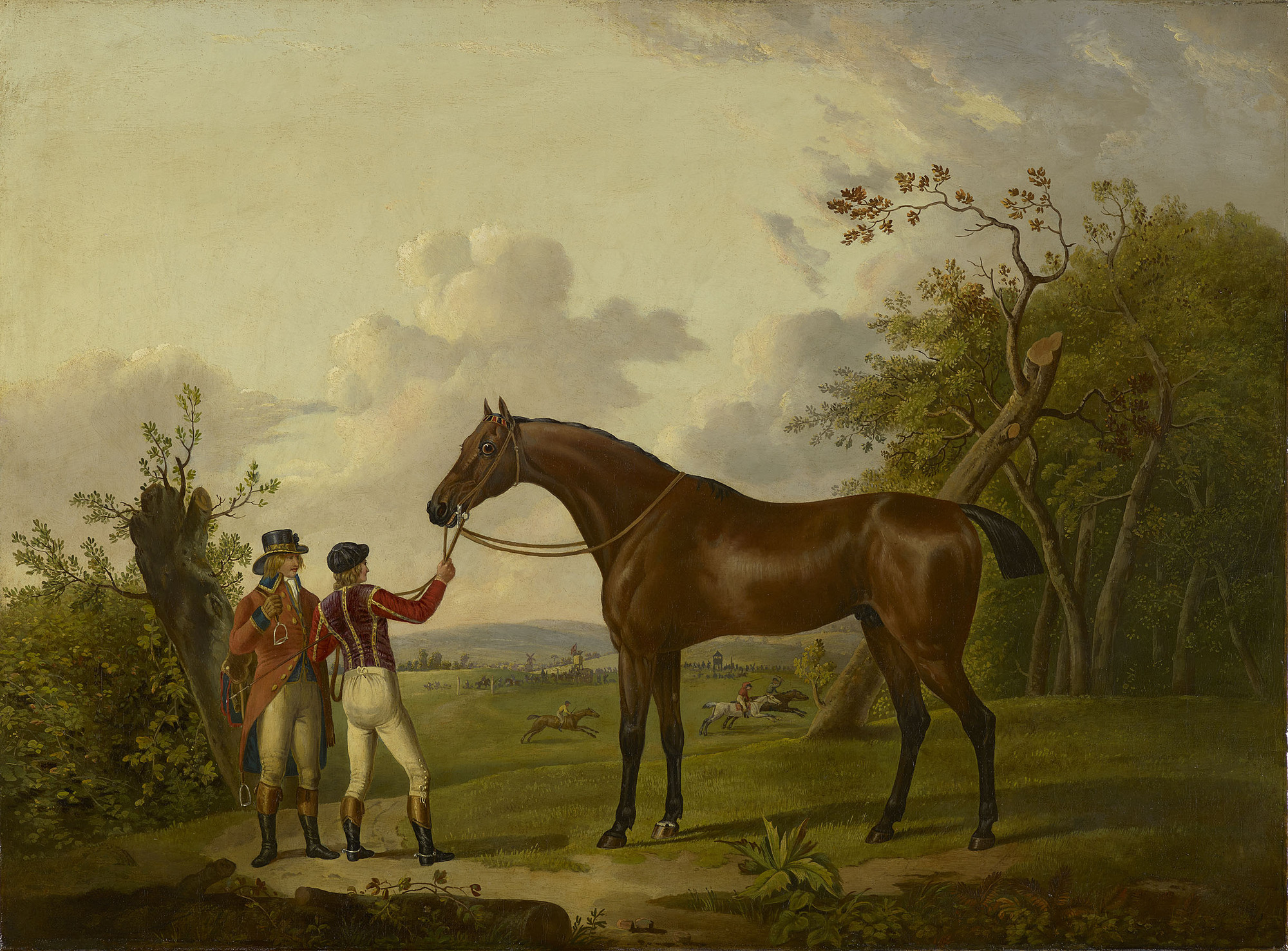
Escape, probably painted by John Nost Sartorius, with his jockey Samuel Chifney wearing the racing colors of the Prince of Wales (later George IV)

Escape (c. 1785) was a British thoroughbred racehorse bred by the Prince of Wales, later George IV. According to M. Dorothy George, by his final races in 1791 he was "reputed the best horse on the turf". In 1791 a sanction from the Jockey Club over two races, one lost as favourite and another a day later won at higher odds, resulted in the prince leaving Newmarket, never to return.

== Pedigree and early life ==
Escape was foaled around 1785, out of Sister to Nanette by Highflyer, in the stables of the Prince of Wales. His pedigree includes King Herod, Squirrel, Tartar, Blank, and the Godolphin Arabian. He was a bay.

The prince sold the as-yet-unnamed colt to a Mr. Franco for 95 guineas in 1786. Franco named the colt Escape after the colt kicked out boards in his stall and one of his legs became trapped, but was freed unharmed, escaping injury.

== Career ==
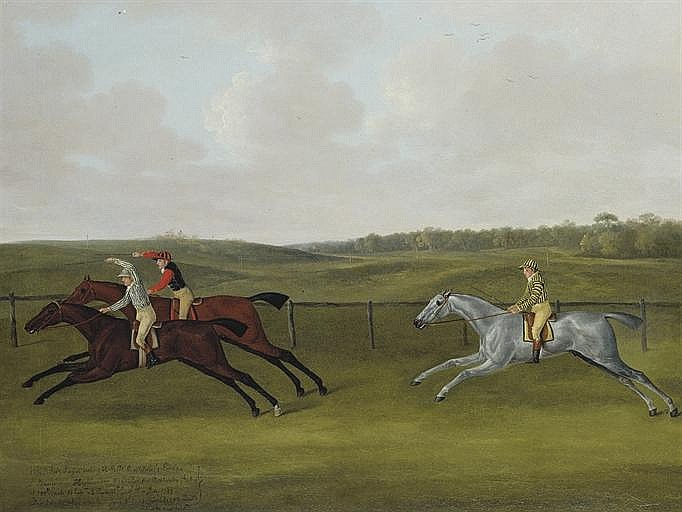
Escape second behind Charles James Fox's Seagull in the 1790 Ascot Oatland Stakes by John Nost Sartorius

Escape ran for Franco as a 3-year-old in two races; in his second, in 1789, he beat the prince's horse Canto Baboo, and the prince purchased him back from Franco for 200 guineas. He ran for the prince from then until he retired from racing to stand at stud.

In fifteen starts he had ten wins and three places. According to George, by his final races in 1791 he was "reputed the best horse on the turf".

== Newmarket sensation ==
On 20 October 1791, Escape started the last two miles of Newmarket's Ditch in Course as 2/1 on favourite and finished fourth and last against Mr Dawson's Coriander, Lord Grosvenor's Skylark and Lord Clermont's Pipator, two of which were considered inferior horses, losing a 60 guineas purse.

On 21 October, Escape ran four miles of Newmarket's Beacon Course at odds of 5/1 against Alderman, Chanticleer, Grey Diomed, Harpator, and Skylark, winning 60 guineas.

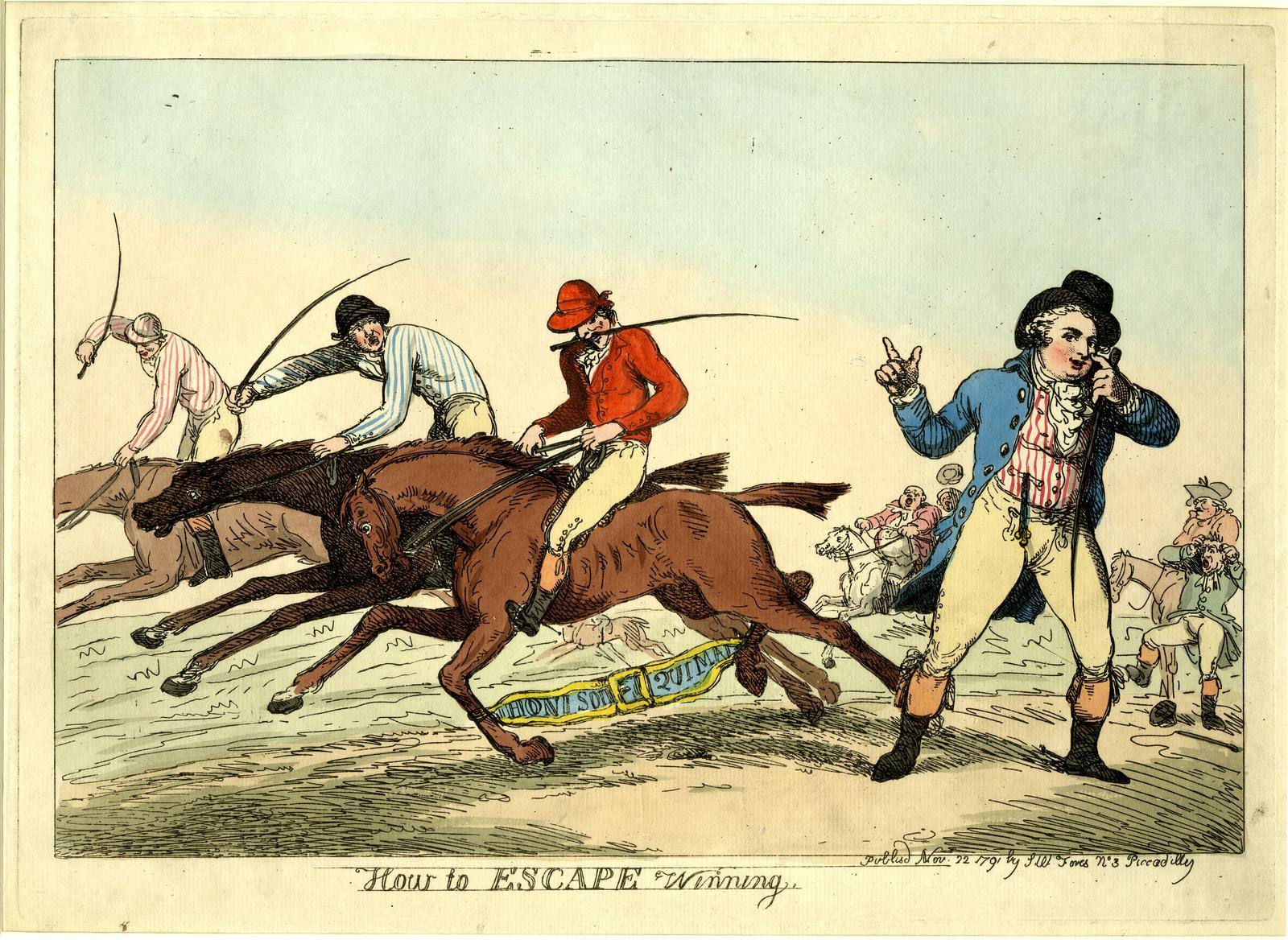
How to Escape Winning by Thomas Rowlandson. Escape's legs are bound by the motto of the Order of the Garter, and his jockey is shown holding him back.

The reversal of form raised suspicions against the prince's private jockey, Samuel Chifney, of losing on purpose to raise the odds. Jockey Club stewards Charles Bunbury, Ralph Dutton and Thomas Panton told the prince that if he continued to employ Chifney, "no gentleman would start against him". The prince instead announced he would no longer race at all. He sold his stable and, despite pleas from the Jockey Club, never returned to Newmarket.

According to George, the prince's 1831 biographer Robert Huish said the incident had "damaged his reputation as a man of honour more than any other event of his life".

== Offspring ==
Emigrant (c. 1794) won the July Stakes. Jonah (c.1795) raced until 1801 and was purchased by an American buyer to stand at stud.
