= Frank Collinson =

English jockey

Personal information
- Died: 1811
- Occupation: Jockey

Horse racing career
- Sport: Horse racing

Major racing wins
- Major races Epsom Derby (1808)

Significant horses
- Pan

Frank Collinson (died 1811) was an English jockey, who won the 1808 Derby.

Collinson was the son of a Yorkshire farmer and joined the stable of Christopher Jackson at Middleham as a young boy, where he learnt to ride "in a masterly Yorkshire style"

In 1808, he won the Derby on a 20/1 outsider, Pan, by half a length at odds from a field of ten for a prize of £1,260. He was somewhat fortunate to win, as the jockey on the runner-up, Bill Clift, had failed to notice Collinson's challenge until it was too late. In winning the Derby, however, he paid a fatal price. On his way to Epsom for the race, he slept in a damp bed at an inn and contracted the illness that would kill him.

== Major wins ==
(United Kingdom) Great Britain

- Epsom Derby – Pan (1808)

== Bibliography ==
- Mortimer, Roger; Onslow, Richard; Willett, Peter (1978). Biographical Encyclopaedia of British Racing. London: Macdonald and Jane's. ISBN 0-354-08536-0.
