= Fyldener =

British-bred Thoroughbred racehorse

- Sire: Sir Peter Teazle
- Grandsire: Highflyer
- Dam: Fanny
- Damsire: Diomed
- Sex: Stallion
- Foaled: 1803
- Country: United Kingdom
- Colour: Bay
- Owner: John Clifton
- Record: 10:6-0-2

Major wins
- St Leger Stakes (1806)

Fyldener (1803–1829) was a British Thoroughbred racehorse and sire best known for winning the classic St Leger Stakes in 1806. In a racing career which lasted from June 1806 until June 1809 he won six times from ten competitive starts. As a three-year-old, Fyldener won his first four races, culminating with a win in the St Leger at Doncaster Racecourse. He failed to win in an abbreviated 1807 season and missed the whole of 1808, before returning as a six-year-old in 1809 to win his last two races. After his retirement from racing he had a long, but relatively undistinguished career as a breeding stallion.

== Background ==
Fyldener was a bay horse "of great size and power" with black legs and no white markings, bred by John Clifton. His sire, Sir Peter Teazle (or simply "Sir Peter") won the Epsom Derby in 1787 and became the most successful stallion of the time, winning the title of Champion sire on ten occasions between 1799 and 1809. His Dam, Fanny, was an important broodmare, having previously produced the Doncaster Cup winner and Derby runner-up Sir Oliver, and a successful racehorse named Poulton. Fanny's other direct descendants included Chapeau d'Espagne and Rattlewings, the Foundation mare of Thoroughbred family 13-e. Fyldener is a name given to an inhabitant of the Fylde peninsula in Lancashire.

== Racing career ==
=== 1806: three-year-old season ===
Fyldener was unraced as a two-year-old and began his racing career at the York spring meeting in 1806. On 2 June, the opening day of the meeting, he won a match race over one and a half miles, beating Baronet, who bolted after taking an early lead. Two days later he ran in a sweepstakes over the same course and distance. He started at odds of 4/1 and after a "very fine race" won by a head from Sir William Gerard's colt Julius Caesar with Baronet in third. On 20 August, Fyldener returned to York for a two-mile sweepstakes. He started the 1/4 favourite and "won easy" from his only opponent, a filly named Off-she-goes.

On 23 September, Fyldener was one of fifteen colts and fillies to contest the thirty-first running of the St Leger Stakes at Doncaster Racecourse. The race attracted an unprecedentedly large crowd which included the Prince of Wales and the Duke of Clarence. Ridden by Tom Carr, Fyldener started the 7/4 favourite ahead of his stable companion Warrior (3/1), Sir John Shelley's Clasher and Mr Mellish's Luck's All (12/1). After a "remarkable fine race" Fyldener won the classic by a length from Lord Strathmore's unnamed brother to Witchcraft, with Richard Watt's colt Shuttlecock in third. Two days later, Fyldener ran in a Maiden Plate at the same meeting which was run in a series of two mile heats, with the prize going to the first horse to win twice. The colt sustained his first defeats as he finished second in the first heat, and third in the next two, as the prize went to Mr Garforth's grey colt by Hambletonian.

=== 1807: four-year-old season ===
On 26 August, Fyldener made his first appearance as a four-year-old in a three-mile sweepstakes at York. He started the 7/4 favourite, but finished third of the five runners behind Christopher Wilson's colt Smuggler and the 1806 Derby winner Paris. Later at the same meeting Fyldener was scheduled to run a one-mile match race against Richard Watt's Shuttlecock, but Watt paid a forfeit 250 guineas, when his colt failed to appear for the race. In September, Fyldener returned to the scene of his classic victory to contest the Fitzwilliam Stakes over one and a half miles at Doncaster. He started the odds-on favourite, but finished fifth of the seven runners behind Sir Thomas Gascoigne's filly Thomasina.

=== 1809: six-year-old season ===
Fyldener missed the whole of the 1808 season before returning as a six-year-old in 1809. On 1 May at Chester Racecourse he finished fifth in the first heat of a maiden plate and was withdrawn from the subsequent heats. Four days later he was entered in a handicap race at the same course, in which he was assigned a weight of 130 pounds. Fyldener won by half a neck from Cestrian in what was described as a "fine race" to record his first win since his St Leger victory. Fyldener's final race was a four-mile sweepstakes at Newton Racecourse on 16 June. He won a "severe race to the end" by half a length from Miss Blanchard and Stilton.

== Stud career ==
Fyldener spent his stud career at Croft's Farm, near Stratford-on-Avon beginning at a fee of five guineas. By the 1818 season, his fee had risen to 10 guineas for Thoroughbred mares and five guineas for half-bred mares: by this time several of his offspring had won races, and he was acquiring a reputation as a sire of hunters. Fyldener remained at Croft's Farm until 1826, the last year in which his name was advertised in the list of stallions. He died in 1829 at the age of twenty-six.

== Pedigree ==
Pedigree of Fyldener (GB), bay stallion, 1803
| Sire Sir Peter Teazle (GB) 1784 | Highflyer; 1774 | Herod* | Tartar |
| Sire Sir Peter Teazle (GB) 1784 | Highflyer; 1774 | Herod* | Cypron |
| Sire Sir Peter Teazle (GB) 1784 | Highflyer; 1774 | Rachel | Blank* |
| Sire Sir Peter Teazle (GB) 1784 | Highflyer; 1774 | Rachel | Regulus mare*^ |
| Sire Sir Peter Teazle (GB) 1784 | Papillon; 1769 | Snap | Snip |
| Sire Sir Peter Teazle (GB) 1784 | Papillon; 1769 | Snap | sister to Slipby |
| Sire Sir Peter Teazle (GB) 1784 | Papillon; 1769 | Miss Cleveland | Regulus^ |
| Sire Sir Peter Teazle (GB) 1784 | Papillon; 1769 | Miss Cleveland | Midge |
| Dam Fanny (GB) 1790 | Diomed; 1777 | Florizel | Herod* |
| Dam Fanny (GB) 1790 | Diomed; 1777 | Florizel | Cygnet mare |
| Dam Fanny (GB) 1790 | Diomed; 1777 | sister to Juno | Spectator |
| Dam Fanny (GB) 1790 | Diomed; 1777 | sister to Juno | Horatia |
| Dam Fanny (GB) 1790 | Ambrosia; 1783 | Woodpecker | Herod* |
| Dam Fanny (GB) 1790 | Ambrosia; 1783 | Woodpecker | Miss Ramsden |
| Dam Fanny (GB) 1790 | Ambrosia; 1783 | Ruth | Blank* |
| Dam Fanny (GB) 1790 | Ambrosia; 1783 | Ruth | Regulus mare*^ (Family:13) |

* Fyldener is inbred 3S x 4D x 4D to the stallion Herod, meaning that he appears third generation once on the sire side of his pedigree and fourth generation twice on the dam side of his pedigree.

* Fyldener is inbred 4S x 4D to the stallion Blank, meaning that he appears fourth generation on the sire side of his pedigree and fourth generation on the dam side of his pedigree.

* Fyldener is inbred 4S x 4D to the mare Regulus mare, meaning that she appears fourth generation on the sire side of his pedigree and fourth generation on the dam side of his pedigree.

^ Fyldener is inbred 5S x 4S x 5D to the stallion Regulus, meaning that he appears fifth and fourth generation once each on the sire side of his pedigree, and fifth generation once on the dam side of his pedigree.
