= St Patrick (horse) =

British-bred Thoroughbred racehorse

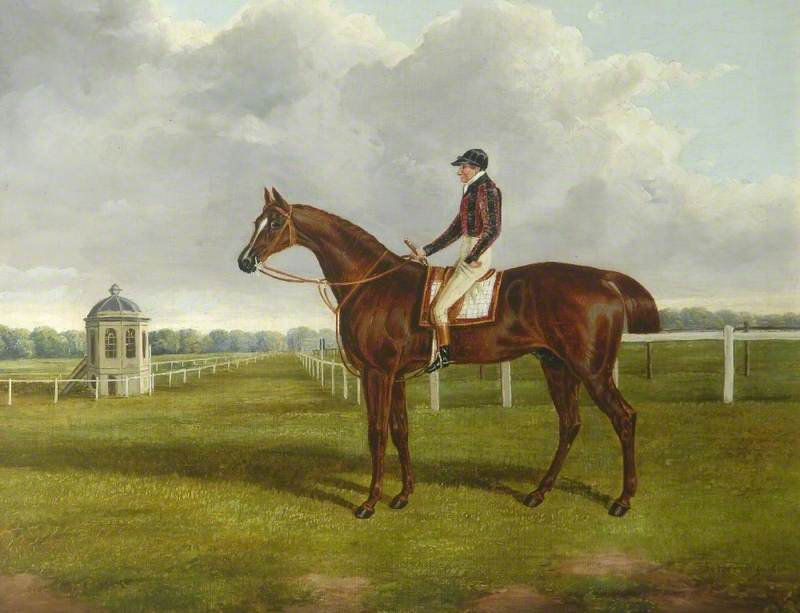
- St. Patrick, by John Frederick Herring Sr.
- Sire: Walton
- Grandsire: Sir Peter Teazle
- Dam: Dick Andrews mare
- Damsire: Dick Andrews
- Sex: Stallion
- Foaled: 1817
- Country: United Kingdom
- Colour: Chestnut
- Breeder: Sir Edward Smith-Dodsworth
- Owner: Sir Edward Smith-Dodsworth
- Trainer: John Lonsdale
- Record: 7: 6-1-0

Major wins
- Old Stakes (1820); St Leger Stakes (1820); York Gold Cup (1821); Pontefract Gold Cup (1821)

St Patrick (1817–1843) was a British Thoroughbred racehorse and sire best known for winning the classic St Leger Stakes in 1820. He was unbeaten in four races as a three-year-old, culminating with a success against twenty-six opponents in the St Leger at Doncaster Racecourse. In the following year he won Gold Cups at York and Pontefract before being defeated in the Fitzwilliam Stakes at Doncaster. He was then retired to stud where he had some success as a sire of winners.

== Background ==
St Patrick was a chestnut horse with a white star and snip, bred by his owner Sir Edward Smith-Dodsworth. He was sired by Walton, a stallion based at Boroughbridge in Yorkshire. Walton won several King's Plates in his racing career and was successful as a sire of winners. Apart from St Patrick, he sired the classic winners Phantom and Nectar (2000 Guineas). St Patrick was the third of fourteen foals produced by his dam, an unnamed mare sired by Dick Andrews.

St Patrick is not to be confused with another British colt named St Patrick, foaled in the same year, whose wins included the Wokingham Stakes at Royal Ascot.

== Racing career ==
=== 1820: three-year-old season ===
St Patrick made his first appearance at Catterick Bridge Racecourse on 6 April. Ridden by Bob Johnson, he won the Old Stakes over two miles, beating Cumberland, Borodino and High Sheriff. After a break of four and a half months, St Patrick reappeared at York Racecourse on 24 August when he contested a sweepstakes over ten furlongs and "won cleverly" from Lady of the Vale and Fitz-Teazle.

On 26 September, St Patrick was one of a record field of twenty-seven colts and fillies to contest the forty-fifth running of the St Leger at Doncaster Racecourse. Henry Pierce's grey colt Arbutus started favourite at odds of 9/2 with St Patrick the second choice in the betting at 7/1. Dunsinane set a fast early pace and led into the straight but Johnson produced St Patrick with a strong run to take the lead a furlong from the finish and win "in a canter" from Copeland, Locksley and Lady of the Vale.

=== 1821: four-year-old season ===
St Patrick made his four-year-old debut in the Gold Cup at York on 29 May. He started the 11/8 favourite and won "very easy" from Bergami, Consul and three others. On 5 September he started the 1/2 favourite for the two mile, seven furlong Gold Cup at Pontefract Racecourse and won by two lengths from Dunsinane after a "severe run race" to extend his unbeaten run to six. Two weeks later he returned to the scene of his classic victory when he ran in the Fitzwilliam Stakes at Doncaster. He was made the odds-on favourite for the mile and a half race but sustained his first and only defeat as he finished second to Borodino.

== Stud career ==
St Patrick began his stud career at Mr Hood's Grantham Arms in Boroughbridge at a fee of ten guineas, before moving to Thornton Watlas, near Bedale in 1827. In 1830 he stood at Newmarket for an undisclosed fee, but moved back to Yorkshire to stand for a fee of five guineas at Newland Park near Wakefield in 1833. In the following year he moved to Thetford in Norfolk where he stood at a fee of fifteen guineas until 1839. The best of his progeny included St Francis, winner of the Ascot Gold Cup, Shillelagh second to Plenipotentiary in the 1837 Epsom Derby and Birdcatcher, the runner-up in the 1832 St Leger. Through his daughter Currency, he was the damsire of Saint Germain (Prix du Jockey Club) and Jouvence (Prix du Jockey Club, Prix de Diane, Goodwood Cup). St Patrick died in early June 1843 at the age of 26.

== Pedigree ==
Pedigree of St Patrick (GB), chestnut stallion, 1817
Sire Walton (GB) 1799	Sir Peter Teazle; 1784	Highflyer*	Herod
Sire Walton (GB) 1799	Sir Peter Teazle; 1784	Highflyer*	Rachel
Sire Walton (GB) 1799	Sir Peter Teazle; 1784	Papillon	Snap
Sire Walton (GB) 1799	Sir Peter Teazle; 1784	Papillon	Miss Cleveland
Sire Walton (GB) 1799	Arethusa; 1792	Dungannon	Eclipse*
Sire Walton (GB) 1799	Arethusa; 1792	Dungannon	Aspasia
Sire Walton (GB) 1799	Arethusa; 1792	Prophet mare	Prophet
Sire Walton (GB) 1799	Arethusa; 1792	Prophet mare	Virago
Dam Dick Andrews mare (GB) 1810	Dick Andrews; 1797	Joe Andrews	Eclipse*
Dam Dick Andrews mare (GB) 1810	Dick Andrews; 1797	Joe Andrews	Amaranda
Dam Dick Andrews mare (GB) 1810	Dick Andrews; 1797	Highflyer mare (1790)	Highflyer*
Dam Dick Andrews mare (GB) 1810	Dick Andrews; 1797	Highflyer mare (1790)	Cardinal Puff mare
Dam Dick Andrews mare (GB) 1810	Trumpator mare 1800	Trumpator	Conductor
Dam Dick Andrews mare (GB) 1810	Trumpator mare 1800	Trumpator	Brunette
Dam Dick Andrews mare (GB) 1810	Trumpator mare 1800	Highflyer mare (1793)	Highflyer*
Dam Dick Andrews mare (GB) 1810	Trumpator mare 1800	Highflyer mare (1793)	Othothea (Family:4-p)

* St Patrick is inbred 3S x 4D x 4D to the stallion Highflyer, meaning that he appears third generation once on the sire side of his pedigree and fourth generation twice on the dam side of his pedigree.

* St Patrick is inbred 4S x 4D to the stallion Eclipse, meaning that he appears fourth generation on the sire side of his pedigree and fourth generation on the dam side of his pedigree.
