= Herod (horse) =

British Thoroughbred racehorse

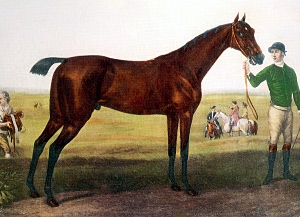
- Herod (King Herod)
- Sire: Tartar
- Grandsire: Partner
- Dam: Cypron
- Damsire: Blaze
- Sex: Stallion
- Foaled: April 1758
- Died: 12 May 1780 (aged 22)
- Country: Great Britain
- Colour: Bay
- Breeder: Prince William, Duke of Cumberland
- Owner: Prince William, Duke of Cumberland, Sir John Moore
- Earnings: ca. £4,500

Awards
- Leading sire in Great Britain and Ireland (1777, 1778, 1779, 1780, 1781, 1782, 1783, 1784)
- Last updated on 14 August 2009

Herod (originally King Herod; April 1758 – 12 May 1780) was a Thoroughbred racehorse. Herod was the foundation sire responsible for keeping the Byerley Turk sire-line alive.

== Background ==
Bred by Prince William, Duke of Cumberland, he was by the stallion Tartar, a very good racehorse, who won many races including the King's plate at Litchfield, the King's plate at Guildford, and the King's plate at Newmarket. In addition to Herod, Tartar sired Thais (dam of Silvertail), Fanny (second dam of King Fergus), the O'Kelly Old Tartar mare (dam of Volunteer), and others. Herod's dam, Cypron (1750 bay filly), was bred by Sir W. St Quintin. Herod was a half-brother Lady Bolingbroke (dam of Tetotum, Epsom Oaks) and a mare (1757) (dam of Clay Hall Marske) by Regulus.

== Description ==
Herod was a bay horse standing 15.3 hands high with a small star and no white on his legs. He was good at four-mile distances.

== Racing career ==
Herod began racing at five, the usual age to begin training for this period, in October 1763 winning a race on the four mile Beacon course at Newmarket. At age six, he won another race at Newmarket, followed by a four-miler at Ascot and a match against Antinous over the Beacon course. When he was seven, his owner died and he was sold in a dispersal sale to Sir John Moore, and it wasn't until 1766 that he returned to the track, where he won again against Antinous in a match over the same course.

His career began to close at this point, as he lost to Ascham, then to Turf, and then finished last in a race at York, after a bleeding attack. He started twice the following year, before retiring to stud.

== Breeding career ==
Herod retired in 1770 and stood at the stud of Sir John Moore at Neather Hall, for a fee of 10 guineas, later raised to 25 guineas. He was the leading sire in Great Britain eight times, (1777 to 1784), before his son, Highflyer (1785 to 1796, 1798) and grandson Sir Peter Teazle (1799 to 1802, and 1804 to 1809) took over. Herod's male line continues today in the pedigree of the 2007 Eclipse Stakes winner, Notnowcato. His most important offspring include:

- Florizel: 1768 bay colt, won 16 races out of 23 starts. Sired Diomed, winner of the first Derby and incredibly influential sire in America.
- Fortitude: sire of John Bull
- Highflyer: 1774 bay colt, the most important son of Herod. Unbeaten in 14 races, leading sire several times, one of the 4 foundation lines of the classic Thoroughbred. Got Sir Peter Teazle, Rockingham, Delpini, Escape, St George, and broodmare Prunella.
- Justice: sired Rhadamanthus, Daedalus, and Trifle
- Phoenomenon: won the St. Leger, leading sire
- Woodpecker: 1773 chestnut colt, won the Craven Stakes in 1778, 1779 and 1781, and a 1,400 guineas handicap sweep in 1780 and 140 guineas purse at Newmarket in 1781, both times beating Potoooooooo (pronounced "Pot eight oes"). Although Woodpecker was initially overshadowed by the success of Highflyer, it is Woodpecker who is responsible for the continuation of the Herod sire line to the present day. Woodpecker sired Buzzard, sire of Selim who in turn sired Sultan, six time leading sire, who in turn sired Bay Middleton, another leading sire in the mid-1800s.

Herod sired the winners of 497 races worth £201,505.

He was still covering mares until his death, at age 22, at Netherhall (written as Neather Hall in the old calendars) on 12 May 1780.

== Sire line tree ==
Sire line Herod descent tree
- Herod
  - Florizel
    - Moustrap
    - Crookshanks
    - Diomed
      - Grey Diomed
      - Glaucus
      - Anthony
      - Cedar
      - Greyhound
      - Wrangler
      - Poplar
      - Albemarle
      - Peacemaker
      - Top Gallant
      - Truxton
      - Wonder
        - Tennessee Oscar
      - Florizel (Ball)
      - Vingt'un
      - Stump-the-Dealer
      - Potomac
      - Sir Archy
        - Cicero
        - Sir Arthur
        - Director
        - Grey Archy
        - Spring Hill
        - Tecumseh
        - Young Sir Archy
        - Columbus
        - Reap Hook
        - Warbler
        - Walk-In-The-Water
        - Timoleon
        - Lawrence
        - Carolinian
        - Contention
        - Kosciusko
        - Napoleon
        - Virginian
        - Sir Solomon
        - Rattler
        - Sir Charles
        - Sir William
        - Childers
        - Roanoke
        - Muckle John
        - Sumpter
        - Henry
        - John Richards
        - Stockholder
        - Arab
        - Bertrand
        - Cherokee
        - Marion
        - Phoenomenon
        - Sir Richard
        - Sir William of Transport
        - Janus
        - Rinaldo
        - Robin Adair
        - Gohanna
        - Occupant
        - Pacific
        - Saxe Weimer
        - Crusader
        - Pirate
        - Sir Archy Montorio
        - Giles Scroggins
        - Industry
        - Merlin
        - Red Gauntlet
        - Tariff
        - Hyazim
        - Wild Bill
        - Copperbottom
        - Longwaist
        - Zinganee
      - Duroc
        - Sir Lovell
        - Trouble
        - Marshal Duroc
        - American Eclipse
        - Cock of the Rock
        - Romp
        - Messenger Duroc
        - American Star (Stockholm)
      - Hampton
    - Ulysses
      - Play or Pay
    - King William
    - Admiral
    - Fortunio
      - King Bladud
      - Prince Frederick
    - Slender
    - Punch
    - Fidget
      - Fidget Colt
    - Brilliant
    - Bustler
    - Florizel
    - Prizefighter
      - Swordsman
        - Spartacus
      - Buffer
        - Lenox
        - Abundance
        - The Curragh Guide
        - Master Robert
    - Eager
    - Slapbang
    - Tartar
    - Ninety-three
  - Magnet
    - Ringwood
    - Poker
    - Shoveler
    - Dare Devil
    - Magnetic Needle
  - Plunder
    - Oak
  - Postmaster
    - Express
  - Fitzherod
    - Mufti
      - Earby
      - Trafalgar
  - Woodpecker
    - Buzzard
      - Poppinjay
      - Dotterel
      - Quiz
        - Tigris
        - Roller
        - Euphrates
      - Brainstorm
        - Glow-Worm
      - Bustard
      - Castrel
        - Bustard
          - Heron
            - Fisherman
        - Merlin
          - Lamplighter
            - Phosphorus
          - Theorem
        - Pantaloon
      - Selim
        - Champion
        - Fandango
        - Azor
        - Sultan
        - Feramorz
        - Langar
        - Marcellus
        - Nicolo
        - Saracen
        - The Moslem
        - Turcoman
      - Deceiver
      - Pantaloon
      - Rubens
        - Raphael
        - Bobadil
        - Gainsborough
        - Sovereign
        - Strephon
        - Doctor Eady
        - Tandem
        - Taniers
        - Peter Lely
        - Titian
        - Holbein
        - Wiseacre
        - Roderick
        - Sir Edward Codrington
      - Hephestion
      - Junius
      - Buzzard (Blackburn)
    - Chanticleer
      - Traveller
      - Fitz Emily
      - Bob Booty
        - Dunkellin
        - Byron
        - Napoleon
    - Dragon
      - Speculator
      - Phoenix
      - Tom Tough
      - Dragon (Cage)
    - Young Woodpecker
      - Slender Billy
  - Bourdeaux
    - Highlander
  - Highflyer
    - Delpini
      - Timothy
      - Symmetry
      - Lenox
        - Deserter
      - Evander
        - Pericles
      - Seymour
        - Moses
        - Young Seymour
    - Pharamond
    - Rockingham
    - Highflyer (Hyde)
    - Slope
    - Noble
      - Sheet Anchor
    - Sir Peter Teazle
      - Young Sir Peter Teazle
      - Ambrosio
      - Old England
        - Brown Bread
      - Honest John
      - Stamford
        - Viscount
      - Knowsley
      - Sir Harry
        - Sir Alfred
        - Sir Hal
        - Moses
      - Archduke
        - Roseden
        - Grand Duke
      - Expectation
      - Robin Redbreast
      - Sir Solomon
      - Agonistes
        - Whitworth
      - Haphazard
        - X Y Z
        - Don Cossack
        - Filho da Puta
        - Antar
        - Reginald
        - Figaro
      - Pipylin
      - Walton
        - Phantom
        - Vandyke Junior
        - Rainbow
        - Partisan
        - Nectar
        - Waterloo
        - Arbutus
        - St Patrick
      - Ditto
        - Luzborough
      - Sir Oliver
        - Olive
        - Doge of Venice
      - Barbarossa
      - Caleb Quot'em
      - Milo
      - Sir Paul
        - Otho
        - Paulowitz
      - Fyldener
        - Tozer
        - Buffalo
        - Bramshill
      - Paris
      - Trafalgar
      - Cardinal York
        - Advance
      - Petronius
      - Poulton
    - Spadille
      - Dion
      - Quatorze
      - Vole
      - Manilla
      - Spindleshanks
    - Escape
      - Emigrant
      - Jonah
    - Traveller
    - Skylark
    - Skyscraper
      - Skyrocket
    - Sourcrout
    - Walnut
      - Gamenut
      - Lignum Vitae
      - Merry Andrew
      - Sowerby
      - True Blue
      - Archibald
      - Ashton
    - Lambinos
    - St George
      - Zodiac
      - Sweetwilliam
      - Pan
    - Oberon
    - Exton
    - Moorcock
      - Ptarmigan
      - Heathpoult
      - Plunder
    - Diamond
    - Highflyer (Hyde)
  - Justice
    - Mentor
    - Rhadamanthus
    - Daedalus
  - Il' Mio
    - Blandish
    - Minos
  - Weazle
  - Whipcord
  - Anvil
    - St George
    - Cymbeline
    - O' Kelly
  - Drone
    - Arra Kooker
    - Lounger
  - Fortitude
    - John Bull
      - Admiral Nelson
      - Alfred
      - Fortitude
      - Muley Moloch
      - Cesario
      - Gauntlet
        - Paddy Bull
      - Ardrossan
        - Sir Malichi Malagrowther
  - Tom Tug(g)
    - Commodore
      - Escape
      - Rugantino
        - Nabocklish
      - Antagonist
  - Bagot
    - Master Bagot
  - Phoenomenon
    - Ambidexter
    - Boreas
    - Idas
    - Lizard
    - Diomed (Tate)
    - Huby
    - Restless
    - Freeholder
    - Roman
    - Spunk
    - Gay Deceiver
    - Brilliant
    - Hydaspes
    - Tygress
    - Hero
    - Wonder
      - Conqueror
    - Firetail
    - Stripling
      - Octavian
        - Antonio
        - Stotforth
    - Brother to Vivaldi

== Pedigree ==
Pedigree of Herod, bay stallion, 1758
| Sire Tartar ch. 1743 | Partner ch. 1718 | Jigg br. 1701 | Byerley Turk |
| Sire Tartar ch. 1743 | Partner ch. 1718 | Jigg br. 1701 | Spanker Mare |
| Sire Tartar ch. 1743 | Partner ch. 1718 | Sister to Mixbury | Curwen's Bay Barb |
| Sire Tartar ch. 1743 | Partner ch. 1718 | Sister to Mixbury | Curwen Spot Mare |
| Sire Tartar ch. 1743 | Meliora ch. 1729 | Fox b. 1714 | Clumsey |
| Sire Tartar ch. 1743 | Meliora ch. 1729 | Fox b. 1714 | Bay Peg |
| Sire Tartar ch. 1743 | Meliora ch. 1729 | Milkmaid; 1720 | Whartons Snail |
| Sire Tartar ch. 1743 | Meliora ch. 1729 | Milkmaid; 1720 | Shields Galloway |
| Dam Cypron br. 1750 | Blaze; 1733 | Flying Childers b. 1715 | Darley Arabian |
| Dam Cypron br. 1750 | Blaze; 1733 | Flying Childers b. 1715 | Betty Leedes |
| Dam Cypron br. 1750 | Blaze; 1733 | Confederate filly 1720 | Grey Grantham |
| Dam Cypron br. 1750 | Blaze; 1733 | Confederate filly 1720 | Rutland's Black Barb |
| Dam Cypron br. 1750 | Salome blk. 1733 | Bethells Arabian c.1711 | (unknown) |
| Dam Cypron br. 1750 | Salome blk. 1733 | Bethells Arabian c.1711 | (unknown) |
| Dam Cypron br. 1750 | Salome blk. 1733 | Champion Mare | Graham's Champion |
| Dam Cypron br. 1750 | Salome blk. 1733 | Champion Mare | Darley Arabian Mare |
