= Cedric (racehorse) =

British-bred Thoroughbred racehorse

- Sire: Phantom
- Grandsire: Walton
- Dam: Walton mare
- Damsire: Walton
- Sex: Stallion
- Foaled: 1821
- Country: United Kingdom of Great Britain and Ireland
- Colour: Chestnut
- Breeder: Sir John Shelley, 6th Baronet
- Owner: Sir John Shelley
- Trainer: James Edwards
- Record: 11:8-1-0

Major wins
- Epsom Derby (1824); Winkfield Stakes (1824); Grand Duke Michael Stakes (1824); Match with Bizarre (1825)

Cedric (1821 – 1829) was a British Thoroughbred racehorse. In a career that lasted from April 1824 to August 1826 he ran eleven times and won eight races. Cedric was unraced as a two-year-old, but in 1824 he proved himself the best British colt of his generation by winning seven of his eight races including The Derby and the Grand Duke Michael Stakes. After winning a notable match on his first run as a four-year-old he lost his form and was well beaten in his remaining races. He was retired to stud at the end of 1826 but proved to be completely infertile.

== Background ==
Cedric was a chestnut horse bred at Maresfield in Sussex by his owner Sir John Shelley, 6th Baronet. Shelley owned the stallion Walton and used him to breed Phantom, the Derby winner of 1811. Shelley then bred Phantom to a daughter of Walton, with the unusually inbred Cedric being the result. Phantom was British Champion sire in 1820 and 1824 and made his most enduring impact as the sire of the important broodmare Cobweb.

== Racing career ==
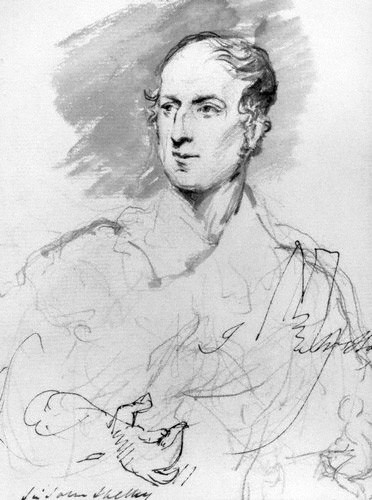
Sir John Shelley bred Cedric, and owned him for all of his wins

=== 1824: three-year-old season ===
Cedric did not race as a two-year-old and began his racing career at the 1824 Newmarket Craven meeting. On 22 April he made his debut in a 100 guinea Sweepstakes over the Ditch Mile course and defeated his only opponent, a colt named Banquo. Later the same afternoon he ran second to the filly Rebecca in the Dinner Stakes over the Rowley Mile. On the opening day of the next Newmarket meeting on 3 May he beat Cydnus to win a 200 guinea Sweepstakes, before reappearing three days later at the same course to win a match race, beating Lord Exeter's colt Progress.

On 3 June Cedric started the 9/2 second favourite for the Derby at Epsom, with Thomas Thornhill's colt Reformer being made 5/2 favourite in a field of seventeen runners. Ridden by James "Jem" Robinson, Cedric won easily from the 16/1 outsider Osmond. Jem Robinson also won The Oaks on Cobweb and was married in the same week reportedly winning a very large bet on the completion of the triple event. Following his Derby win, Cedric was sent to Ascot where he won a three-horse Sweepstakes on the opening day of the meeting at odds of 1/4. A day later he started "long odds on" and won the one mile Winkfield Stakes from his only opponent.

Cedric returned in autumn at Newmarket to face six other runners in the Grand Duke Michael Stakes on 4 October. He started 4/6 favourite and won from the Duke of York's colt Orion, with Don Carlos third. Cedric's owners claimed another prize at the next Newmarket meeting, when the Derby winner was allowed to walk over in a Sweepstakes after the other runners were withdrawn.

=== 1825: four-year-old season ===
Cedric returned as a four-year-old in a match race at Newmarket on 19 April in which he received two pounds in weight from the five-year-old Bizarre, a horse who won the Ascot Gold Cup in both 1824 and 1825. In what was described as "the most exciting" and "the truest run race ever witnessed" the two horses ran together throughout the contest before Cedric pulled ahead to win by half a length . Officially, Cedric and Bizarre were three and four years old for this race as Thoroughbreds had their official "birthday" on 1 May: the modern practice of advancing a horse's age by a year on 1 January was introduced in 1834. Cedric's defeat of the Gold Cup winner was described as confirming his position as "the best in England" at the time. In June, Cedric was sold by John Shelley to John George Lambton for £2,500 and his training base moved to Yorkshire.

Cedric was off the racecourse for five months before reappearing in the Doncaster Cup over two miles five furlongs on 21 September. After winning his last seven races, Cedric started 5/2 second favourite, but finished unplaced behind Lottery. The Sporting Magazine's correspondent "Tyke" felt that Cedric was unsuited by the extreme distance.

=== 1826: five-year-old season ===
On Tuesday 11 April, Cedric failed to appear for a match race, with Lambton paying a forfeit to the owners of his horse's opponent, Sligo. On 11 August Cedric ran in a two-mile race at York in which he finished last of the four runners behind Actaeon. Cedric was then retired from racing.

== Stud career ==
Cedric began his breeding "career" at his owner's Lambton Grange stud in County Durham, where his initial fee for covering mares was £10, or £5 for a mare who had already produced a winner. His stud career was a complete failure as he proved to be infertile and failed to sire a single foal. Cedric died in 1829 of "inflammation" after standing three seasons at stud.

== Pedigree ==
Pedigree of Cedric (GB), chestnut stallion, 1821
Sire Phantom (GB) 1808	Walton*; 1799	Sir Peter Teazle*	Highflyer*
Sire Phantom (GB) 1808	Walton*; 1799	Sir Peter Teazle*	Papillon*
Sire Phantom (GB) 1808	Walton*; 1799	Arethusa*	Dungannon*
Sire Phantom (GB) 1808	Walton*; 1799	Arethusa*	Prophet mare*
Sire Phantom (GB) 1808	Julia; 1799	Whiskey	Saltram
Sire Phantom (GB) 1808	Julia; 1799	Whiskey	Calash
Sire Phantom (GB) 1808	Julia; 1799	Young Giantess	Diomed
Sire Phantom (GB) 1808	Julia; 1799	Young Giantess	Giantess
Dam Walton mare (GB) 1812	Walton*; 1799	Sir Peter Teazle*	Highflyer*
Dam Walton mare (GB) 1812	Walton*; 1799	Sir Peter Teazle*	Papillon*
Dam Walton mare (GB) 1812	Walton*; 1799	Arethusa*	Dungannon*
Dam Walton mare (GB) 1812	Walton*; 1799	Arethusa*	Prophet mare*
Dam Walton mare (GB) 1812	Trumpator mare† 1803	Trumpator	Conductor
Dam Walton mare (GB) 1812	Trumpator mare† 1803	Trumpator	Brunette
Dam Walton mare (GB) 1812	Trumpator mare† 1803	Demirep	Highflyer*
Dam Walton mare (GB) 1812	Trumpator mare† 1803	Demirep	Brim (Family:9-d)

* Cedric is inbred 2S x 2D to the stallion Walton, meaning that he appears second generation on the sire side of his pedigree and second generation on the dam side of his pedigree.

* Cedric is inbred 4S x 4D x 4D to the stallion Highflyer, meaning that he appears fourth generation once on the sire side of his pedigree and fourth generation twice on the dam side of his pedigree.

†Trumpator mare also appears in pedigrees as Sister 2 to Repeator
