= Sir Peter Teazle =

British Thoroughbred racehorse

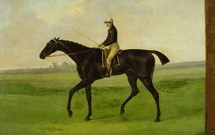
- Sir Peter Teazle
- Sire: Highflyer
- Grandsire: Herod
- Dam: Papillon
- Damsire: Snap
- Sex: Stallion
- Foaled: 1784
- Country: Great Britain
- Colour: Brown
- Breeder: Edward Smith-Stanley, 12th Earl of Derby
- Owner: Edward Smith-Stanley, 12th Earl of Derby
- Record: 21: 16 wins

Major wins
- Epsom Derby (1787)

Honours
- Leading sire in GB & Ireland (1799–1802 & 1804–1809)
- Last updated on 23 August 2007

Sir Peter Teazle (1784 – 18 August 1811) was a good British bred Thoroughbred racehorse, a Leading sire in Great Britain & Ireland nine times, and carried on the sire line of Herod.

== Breeding ==
Sir Peter Teazle was a brown horse bred and owned by Edward Smith-Stanley, 12th Earl of Derby. His sire Highflyer was on the Leading Sire list 16 times, producing 469 winners, seven of which won classic races. Highflyer also got the mare Prunella, and the sons Delpini, Diamond, and Traveller.

Sir Peter Teazle's dam, Papillon, was by Snap, himself on the Leading Sire list four times and a great producer of raw speed. Papillon had some success as a racehorse, finishing third out of 22 in the 1773 Craven Stakes, losing to Firetail and Miss Timms. Sir Peter was her 7th out of 12 living foals, and one of several winners she produced, including the filly Lady Teazle (1781), who was second in The Oaks and won 11 races during her career.

The name comes from a character in the classic comic play The School for Scandal.

== Racing career ==
Sir Peter first came to the track at three, and continued the season undefeated. He won The Derby at his first start, a sweepstakes at Ascot, the 1,000 Guineas subscription race for his age group, and the Prince of Wales's Plate, before beating Bullfinch (by Woodpecker) in a 500 guineas match and winning again against Bullfinch by forfeit for a second match. He then won a 40 guineas subscription purse and a sweepstakes by walkover.

At age four (1788) at Newmarket First Spring he won the Jockey Stakes, the rich Claret Stakes, and the Fortescue Stakes, twice beating Buzzard, and received a compromise in a scheduled match against Mentor. At Newmarket July he won the Grosvenor Stakes over two miles. In October at Newmarket he received a forfeit in a 700 guineas match against Mentor. He then suffered his first defeat, in a 500 guineas match against the Duke of Queensberry's four-year-old Florizel colt, Dash, giving Dash 32 pounds in weight; Sir Peter had had to stop training several days before the race because he had "got pricked in shoeing." His final race of the year was a 300 guineas match against the good mare Maria (by Telemachus), which he won. He was seven for eight that season, his only loss one in which he was conceding gobs of weight.

His luck then turned, losing a 500 guineas match to Dash (by Florizel)—who was carrying 32 lbs. less in weight—although this was possibly because Sir Peter was pricked during shoeing, and had to take several days off work before the race. He then defeated Maria (by Telemachus) in a 300 guineas match. He finished his four-year-old season with seven wins from eight starts.

Sir Peter then won the Newmarket Craven, beating Meteor again. He then forfeited two races—a six-mile, 1,000 guineas match against Dash, and 500 guineas match against Meteor—probably due to physical problems. Sir Peter then lost to Mulberry (by Florizel), who was carrying 28 lbs less, over the four mile Beacon course at Newmarket. He then broke down in a later race, and was retired to stud.

== Stud record ==
Sir Peter stood at Derby's Knowsley Stud in Lancashire, where he had great success in the breeding shed. During this time, he sired a Doncaster Cup, four Epsom Derby winners, two Epsom Oaks winners, four St. Leger winners, and finished his career as the Leading Sires list nine times (1799–1802, 1804–1809). His sons Walton and Sir Harry would also be top on the list, Walton in Britain for two years, Sir Harry in the US. His top offspring include:

- Agonistes: won the Richmond Cup, and others, 3rd in St. Leger
- Archduke: 1796 colt, won the Derby 1799.
- Ambrosio: 1793 colt, won 18 races including the St. Leger in 1796, the Newmarket Craven Oatlands twice (beating brother Stamford one time), the Newmarket's Jockey Club Plate, and the Great Subscription Purse at York.
- Barbarossa: 1802 colt, won the Egremont Stakes at Brighton, the Somerset Stakes, and several Kings Plates.
- Beatrice: 1791 filly, dam to Vicissitude (dam to great broodmare Gibside Fairy)
- Caleb Quotem: 1802 colt, won the Doncaster Cup, 2nd in the St. Leger
- Cecilia: 1793 filly, won at Chesterfield. Dam to Whitenose (1806, by Don Quixote, won Doncaster Cup).
- Ditto: 1800 colt, won the Derby in 1803, the Claret Stakes at Newmarket, Newmarket's Craven Stakes, and the King's Plate at Guildford. Sired Luzborough (1820, winner of 25 of 36 starts, later imported to the US)
- Expectation: won the Ladies' Plate at Lewes
- Fyldener: 1803 colt, won the St. Leger in 1806 in addition to six other races, grandsire of Swallow (1833)
- Haphazard: 1797 brown colt, a very good racehorse, sire of Filho da Puta (winner of the St. Leger, Doncaster Cup, and others; one-time Leading Sire), Antar (2,000 Guineas winner), Reginald (2,000 Guineas winner), Rowena (1,000 Guineas winner), and Figaro (Doncaster Cup winner).
- Hermione: 1791 mare by Florizel, won 21 races, including the Oaks
- Houghton Lass: 1801 filly, 2nd twice in Newmarket's Oatlands Handicap stakes, 2nd in the Somerset Stakes at Brighton; dam to Comus (by Sorcerer) and Humphrey Clinker
- Knowsley: won the King's Plates
- Margaretta: 1802 filly, dam to Scarecrow (1813, by Canopus, winner of Goodwood Cup) and Waverley (1817, by Whalebone, sire to Doncaster Cup and York St. Leger winner The Saddler; Manchester Cup winner Sylvan; The Provost; Inheritress; and Doncaster Cup and St. Leger winner Don John)
- Mary Ann: 1791 filly, 2nd to Eliza in a King's Plate. Dam to Oaks winner Oriana (1807, by Beningbrough), and Ashton (1799).
- Paris: 1803 colt, won the Derby in 1806
- Parisot: 1793 filly, won the 1796 Oaks
- Paulina: 1804 filly by Tandem, sister to Sir Paul, won 8 races including the 1807 St. Leger, a Produce Stakes, the Filly Stakes, and a King's Plate. Produced daughters Camilla and Galatea (dam to Sir Tatton Sykes, and Derby winner Andover)
- Petronius 1805 colt, won the St. Leger in 1808
- Pipylin: 1799 colt, record 26: 11-3-?, 2nd in St. Leger
- Sir Harry: 1795 brown colt, won the Derby in 1798, then imported into America for the highest price ever paid for a horse ever brought there. Sired Medora (Oaks winner, daughter Gulnare also won the Oaks), and was a Leading Sire in the United States, producing Haxall's Moses (1816) and Sir Alfred (1806).
- Sir Oliver: 1800 colt, won 9 races, including the Doncaster Cup, sired Olive (2,000 Guineas) and Doge of Vince (Chester Cup)
- Sir Paul: 1802 colt, brother to Paulina. Third in the 1805 St. Leger to Staveley and brother Calem Quotem, third in the Doncaster Cup. Sired Otho (1815, winner of the Doncaster Cup) and Paulowitz (1813), sire of Archibald
- Sir Solomon: 1796 colt, who won the King's Plate at York, the Stand Plate, the King's Plate at Newcastle, the Newcastle Cup twice, the Nottingham Cup, the Great Subscription Purse at York, and beat the 1799 St. Leger winner, Cockfighter at Doncaster. 2nd and 3rd in the Doncaster Cup. Got Henrietta (1807, dam of St. Leger winner Tarrare), Remembrance (tail-female ancestress of Derby winner Daniel O'Rourke, the important stallion Dark Ronald, German and French classic winners, and American horses Upset, Hill Prince, Greek Song, Silent Screen, Peter Quince, Cicada, and First Landing).
- Stamford: 1794 brown colt, won 11 races, including the Doncaster Cup twice and the Kings Plate, 2nd in the 1797 St. Leger and the Jockey Club Stakes. Known as a broodmare sire, he produced Lady Rachel (dam to the extremely good race mare, Fleur de Lis who won 20 times including the Doncaster Stakes, the Doncaster Cup, the Goodwood Cup, the Oatlands handicap stakes, Epsom's Craven Stakes, and others), Emily (dam to Emilia and Derby-winner and 2-time Leading Sire Emilius), Diana (dam of Richmond Cup winner Actaeon), Miss Cantley (dam of Beiram and Mecca), Belvoirina (winner of the July Stakes, with many great descendants), Maria (1824, a very good race mare), and many others.
- Trafalgar: 1802 colt, won the Prince's Stakes at Newmarket, Brighton's Pavilion Stakes, the Egremont Stakes, the Pontefract Gold Cup, the Doncaster Stakes, second in the Doncaster Gold Cup, York Spring, was second in York's Great Subscription Purse, second in the 1806 Derby. Sired Larissa (1813 filly).
- Walton: 1799 bay colt, won several Kings plates, the Oatlands Handicap, and many match races. Twice leading sire, he got Phantom (Derby winner, Leading Sire), St Patrick (winner of St. Leger), Nectar (2,000 Guineas), Rainbow, and Partisan.
- Young Sir Peter Teazle: 1791 colt, sent to the US where he got Virgo (1809 filly)

== Sire line tree ==
- Sir Peter Teazle
  - Young Sir Peter Teazle
  - Ambrosio
  - Old England
    - Brown Bread
      - Rasping
  - Honest John
  - Stamford
    - Viscount
  - Knowsley
  - Sir Harry
    - Sir Alfred
    - Sir Hal
    - Moses
  - Archduke
    - Roseden
    - Grand Duke
      - Autocrat
  - Expectation
  - Robin Redbreast
  - Sir Solomon
  - Agonistes
    - Whitworth
  - Haphazard
    - X Y Z
    - Don Cossack
    - Filho da Puta
      - Dr Faustus
        - Chandler
        - Tupsley
      - Hedgeford
        - Denmark
      - Birmingham
      - Philip
      - Colwick
        - Attila
    - Antar
    - Reginald
    - Figaro
  - Pipylin
  - Walton
    - Phantom
      - Cedric
      - Serab
      - Pindarrie
      - Enamel
      - Middleton
      - Glenartney
      - Taurus
        - Boeotian
        - Minotaurus
        - Turnus
        - Salem
    - Vandyke Junior
      - The Flyer
    - Rainbow
      - Giles
      - Hercule
      - Franck
    - Partisan
      - Godolphin
        - Mazeppa
      - Mameluke
      - Patron
        - Dover
        - Peter Simple
      - Glaucus
        - Palaemon
        - The Nob
        - Meridian
        - Equator
      - Berwickshire
      - Gladiator
        - Maccabeus
        - Napier
        - Prizefighter
        - Sweetmeat
        - Fitz Gladiator
        - Coustrainville
        - Brocoli
        - Ventre St Gris
        - Union Jack
      - Venison
        - Red Deer
        - The Ugly Buck
        - Alarm
        - Roebuck
        - Sparshot
        - Petitioner
        - Coningsby
        - Repletion
        - Vatican
        - Cariboo
        - Cathedral
        - Marlborough Buck
        - Buckthorn
        - Filius
        - Kingston
        - Elcot
        - Cruiser
        - Tame Deer
    - Nectar
    - Waterloo
      - Grenadier
    - Arbutus
    - St Patrick
      - Birdcatcher
      - St Francis
      - Shillelagh
  - Ditto
    - Luzborough
      - Picton
  - Sir Oliver
    - Olive
    - Doge of Venice
  - Barbarossa
  - Caleb Quot'em
  - Milo
  - Sir Paul
    - Otho
    - Paulowitz
      - King Cole
      - Little Boy Blue
      - Paul Pry
      - Cain
        - Barney Bodkin
        - Castaway
        - Sylvan
        - Barnacles
        - Clifton
        - Vendredi
        - Canute
        - Ion
        - Tubalcain
        - Canton
      - Sharpshooter
      - Changeling
      - Archibald
      - Ernest
  - Fyldener
    - Tozer
    - Buffalo
    - Bramshill
  - Paris
  - Trafalgar
  - Cardinal York
    - Advance
  - Petronius
  - Poulton

== Pedigree ==
Pedigree of Sir Peter Teazle (GB), brown stallion, 1784
Sire Highflyer br. 1774	Herod b. 1758	Tartar ch. 1743	Partner
Sire Highflyer br. 1774	Herod b. 1758	Tartar ch. 1743	Meliora
Sire Highflyer br. 1774	Herod b. 1758	Cypron br. 1750	Blaze
Sire Highflyer br. 1774	Herod b. 1758	Cypron br. 1750	Salome
Sire Highflyer br. 1774	Rachel b. 1763	Blank; 1740	Godolphin Arabian*^
Sire Highflyer br. 1774	Rachel b. 1763	Blank; 1740	Mare by Little Hartley
Sire Highflyer br. 1774	Rachel b. 1763	Mare by Regulus; 1751	Regulus*^
Sire Highflyer br. 1774	Rachel b. 1763	Mare by Regulus; 1751	Mare by Soreheels
Dam Papillon b. 1769	Snap b. 1750	Snip; 1736	Flying Childers
Dam Papillon b. 1769	Snap b. 1750	Snip; 1736	Mare by Basto
Dam Papillon b. 1769	Snap b. 1750	Mare by Fox; 1740	Fox
Dam Papillon b. 1769	Snap b. 1750	Mare by Fox; 1740	Gipsy
Dam Papillon b. 1769	Miss Cleveland b. 1758	Regulus*; 1739	Godolphin Arabian*^
Dam Papillon b. 1769	Miss Cleveland b. 1758	Regulus*; 1739	Grey Robinson
Dam Papillon b. 1769	Miss Cleveland b. 1758	Midge; 174-	Colt by Bay Bolton
Dam Papillon b. 1769	Miss Cleveland b. 1758	Midge; 174-	Bartlett's Childers Mare

* Sir Peter Teazle is inbred 4S x 3D to the stallion Regulus, meaning that he appears fourth generation on the sire side of his pedigree and third generation on the dam side of his pedigree.

*^ Sir Peter Teazle is inbred 4S x 5S x 4D to the stallion Godolphin Arabian, meaning that he appears fourth and fifth generation once each on the sire side of his pedigree and fourth generation once on the dam side of his pedigree.
