= Highflyer (horse) =

British Thoroughbred racehorse

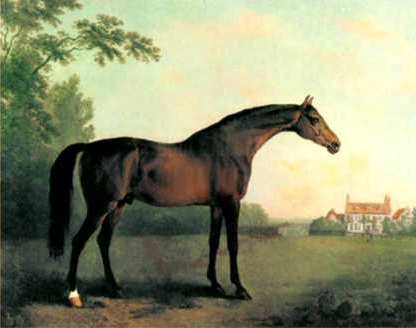
- Sire: Herod
- Grandsire: Tartar
- Dam: Rachel
- Damsire: Blank
- Sex: Stallion
- Foaled: 1774
- Country: Great Britain
- Colour: Bay
- Breeder: Sir Charles Bunbury, 6th Baronet
- Owner: Frederick St John, 2nd Viscount Bolingbroke ("Mr. Compton"), Richard Tattersall
- Record: 14: 14-0-0

Major wins
- 1400 Guineas Stakes (1778); Great Subscription Purse (1779); Great Subscription Purse (1779)

Awards
- Leading sire in Great Britain & Ireland (1785–1796, 1798)
- Last updated on 13 January 2011

Highflyer (1774 – 18 October 1793) was an undefeated Thoroughbred racehorse and a very successful sire of the 18th century.

== Breeding ==
Bred by Sir Charles Bunbury, 6th Baronet, the colt was foaled at Great Barton, in the West Suffolk district of Suffolk, England, in 1774. Highflyer's sire was the important Herod, one of the foundation stallions for the classic Thoroughbred, and himself an excellent racehorse and stud, producing Florizel (b. 1768) and Woodpecker (b. 1773). His dam, Rachel (1763) was by Blank, and out of a mare by Regulus, both stallions by the Godolphin Arabian, making Rachel inbred 2x3 to the great stallion. Blank also sired Pacolet (1763). Highflyer was a half-brother to Mark Anthony (b c 1767 Spectator) who sired the Epsom Derby winner Aimwell.

== Racing career ==
Highflyer began his racing career at a time when the trend was shifting from starting Thoroughbreds at the track at age 5, to instead begin racing them at the younger age of 3. His maiden race was in October 1777, in a 2-mile event for 3-year-olds at Newmarket, which he won. He returned to Newmarket the following year in 1778, beating out the 4-year-olds in both the July and October meet, before winning an open stakes, as well as a match against the Matchem son, Dictator.

In 1779, he won an additional two races before Lord Bolingbroke accepted an offer from Richard Tattersall, who bought the colt for 2,500 pounds. Highflyer continued to race, winning with a walk over at Nottingham and in York at the Great Subscription Stakes. He then won the Great Subscription Stakes for a second time, before winning the King's Purse at Lichfield. He finished his racing career undefeated in 14 race starts.

== Stud record ==
Tattersall's grand plan for Highflyer was built to make him rich, and it certainly accomplished its task. It rested on two main points. First, Tattersall would breed Highflyer to as many mares as possible, bringing in income from the stud fee (a practice for which he was criticised, as many thought he was over-breeding the animal and later pointed to Highflyer's death at 19 to be proof of that fact). To help accomplish this, he stood his stallion at his Red Barns farm for the initial fee of 15 guineas, eventually raising the fee to 50 guineas.

His second tactic was to buy up as many daughters of Eclipse as he could, breed them to Highflyer, and sell them on in-foal. This combined the blood of Herod and Eclipse to produce some excellent racehorses who would form the basis of the modern Thoroughbred. Estimates have found that Tattersall made at least 15,000 pounds each year off of Highflyer breedings, from which he built a mansion aptly named Highflyer Hall.

However, Tattersall was quick to credit the stallion with his financial success. When Highflyer died on 18 October 1793, he was buried in his paddock, and his owner gave the great horse the epitaph: "Here lieth the perfect and beautiful symmetry of the much lamented Highflyer, by whom and his wonderful offspring the celebrated Tattersall acquired a noble fortune, but was not ashamed to acknowledge it."

Highflyer was the Leading Sire for 15 years (1785–1796, 1798), during which time he produced 469 winners, including three Derby winners, three St. Leger winners, and an Epsom Oaks winner.

- Delpini: 1781 grey colt, out of a Blank mare (he was 3x2 inbred to Blank). His best get included two Oaks winners (Scotia and Theophania), a St. Leger winner (Symmetry), the stallions Evander, Seymour, and Timothy, and the daughter Zara.
- Diamond: 1792 brown colt, out of a Matchem daughter, his many wins included the 1796 Jockey Club Stakes, Newcastle's King's Plate, the King's Plate at Newmarket First October and King's Plate at Newmarket First Spring, the four-mile Oxford Cup, the King's Plate at Nottingham, a 1,000 guineas match against Shuttle, and the Jockey Club Plate at Newmarket. He also finished second in the two-mile Great Produce Stakes at York, fourth in the Derby.
- Eliza: 1791 bay filly, out of an Eclipse mare, won the Town Plate (Newmarket), a Produce Stakes (York), the four-mile Richmond Cup, 2nd in the Oaks and in the Craven Stakes (Newmarket), third in the four-mile Doncaster Cup and Doncaster Stakes. Produced Scud (Doncaster winner, sired two Derby and one Oaks winners) and the dam to Consul (winner of the Doncaster Cup).
- Escape: sired the mare Flight, who was second dam of both Birdcatcher and Faugh-a-Ballagh.
- Grey Highflyer: 1782 grey filly, out of a Matchem mare (1), was the dam of Hambletonian.
- Huncamunca: 1787 brown filly, produced Champion (won the Derby and St. Leger), second dam of the Oaks winners, Maid of Orleans and Charlotte, and third-dam of Mameluke (Derby winner)
- Maria: 1791 bay filly, dam to Champignon (winner of the Ascot Gold Cup)
- Noble: 1783 bay colt, won the 1786 Epsom Derby
- Omphale: 1781 bay mare, won the 1784 St. Leger
- Prunella: 1788 bay filly, out of a Snap mare, dam of Derby-winner Waxy Pope (by Waxy), Oaks winner Pelisse (by Whiskey), and Penelope (by Trumpator)
- Rockingham: 1781 bay colt, out of a Matchem daughter, produced Castianira (dam of the American sire Sir Archy (by Diomed)
- Sir Peter Teazle: 1784 brown colt, out of a Snap mare, was his best son. He won 16 races during his life, including the Derby in 1787. He then followed the way of Highflyer, becoming Leading Sire for several years (1799–1802, 1804–1809), and siring five Derby winners, four St. Leger winners, and two Oaks winners, as well as many other very important colts and fillies who had a lasting impact on the breed.
- Skyscraper: 1786 bay colt, won the 1789 Epsom Derby
- Spadille: won the 1787 St. Leger
- Traveller: 1785 bay colt, a good racehorse winning the four-mile Stand Plate, the Great Subscription Purse at York, and matches against Grey Diomed and Meteor (by Eclipse).
- Volante: won the 1792 Oaks
- Unknown "Eagle's Dam": 1785 bay filly, produced Spread Eagle and Didelot (both won the Derby), and the sire Eagle who was imported to the US.
- Young Flora: won the 1788 St. Leger

Other sons of Highflyer include Pharamond, Slope, Walnut, Sourcrout, and St. George. His daughters also became the dams of Meteora, Coelia, N.M.B.O., Dick Andrews, Orville, Paulowitz, Cervantes, Sancho, Oscar, and Bedford. The Highflyer-Eclipse combination produced Skyscraper, Lambinos, St. George, Volante, and Oberon.

== Sire line tree ==
- Highflyer
  - Delpini
    - Timothy
    - Symmetry
    - Lenox
      - Deserter
    - Evander
      - Pericles
    - Seymour
      - Moses
      - Young Seymour
        - Norfolk
  - Pharamond
  - Rockingham
  - Highflyer (Hyde)
  - Slope
  - Noble
    - Sheet Anchor
  - Sir Peter Teazle
    - Young Sir Peter Teazle
    - Ambrosio
    - Old England
      - Brown Bread
        - Rasping
    - Honest John
    - Stamford
      - Viscount
    - Knowsley
    - Sir Harry
      - Sir Alfred
      - Sir Hal
      - Moses
    - Archduke
      - Roseden
      - Grand Duke
        - Autocrat
    - Expectation
    - Robin Redbreast
    - Sir Solomon
    - Agonistes
      - Whitworth
    - Haphazard
      - X Y Z
      - Don Cossack
      - Filho da Puta
        - Dr Faustus
        - Hedgeford
        - Birmingham
        - Colwick
        - Philip
      - Antar
      - Reginald
      - Figaro
    - Pipylin
    - Walton
      - Phantom
        - Cedric
        - Serab
        - Pindarrie
        - Enamel
        - Middleton
        - Glenartney
        - Taurus
      - Vandyke Junior
        - The Flyer
      - Rainbow
        - Giles
        - Hercule
        - Franck
      - Partisan
        - Godolphin
        - Mameluke
        - Patron
        - Glaucus
        - Berwickshire
        - Gladiator
        - Venison
      - Nectar
      - Waterloo
        - Grenadier
      - Arbutus
      - St. Patrick
        - Birdcatcher
        - St. Francis
        - Shillelagh
    - Ditto
      - Luzborough
        - Picton
    - Sir Oliver
      - Olive
      - Doge of Venice
    - Barbarossa
    - Caleb Quot'em
    - Milo
    - Sir Paul
      - Otho
      - Paulowitz
        - King Cole
        - Paul Pry
        - Little Boy Blue
        - Cain
        - Sharpshooter
        - Changeling
        - Archibald
        - Ernest
    - Fyldener
      - Tozer
      - Buffalo
      - Bramshill
    - Paris
    - Trafalgar
    - Cardinal York
      - Advance
    - Petronius
    - Poulton
  - Spadille
    - Dion
    - Quatorze
    - Vole
    - Manilla
    - Spindleshanks
  - Escape
    - Emigrant
    - Jonah
  - Traveller
  - Skylark
  - Skyscraper
    - Skyrocket
  - Sourcrout
  - Walnut
    - Gamenut
    - Lignum Vitae
    - Merry Andrew
    - Sowerby
    - True Blue
    - Archibald
    - Ashton
  - Lambinos
  - St George
    - Zodiac
    - Sweetwilliam
    - Pan
  - Oberon
  - Exton
  - Moorcock
    - Ptarmigan
    - Heathpoult
    - Plunder
  - Diamond
  - Highflyer

== Pedigree ==
Pedigree of Highflyer, bay stallion, 1774
Sire Herod (GB) b. 1758	Tartar ch. 1743	Partner (Old) ch. 1718	Jigg
Sire Herod (GB) b. 1758	Tartar ch. 1743	Partner (Old) ch. 1718	Curwen Barb mare
Sire Herod (GB) b. 1758	Tartar ch. 1743	Meliora ch. 1729	Fox
Sire Herod (GB) b. 1758	Tartar ch. 1743	Meliora ch. 1729	Milkmaid
Sire Herod (GB) b. 1758	Cypron br. 1750	Blaze; 1733	Flying Childers
Sire Herod (GB) b. 1758	Cypron br. 1750	Blaze; 1733	Confederate mare
Sire Herod (GB) b. 1758	Cypron br. 1750	Salome blk. 1733	Bethell's Arabian
Sire Herod (GB) b. 1758	Cypron br. 1750	Salome blk. 1733	(Graham's) Champion mare
Dam Rachel (GB) b. 1763	Blank b. 1740	Godolphin Arabian*	(unknown)
Dam Rachel (GB) b. 1763	Blank b. 1740	Godolphin Arabian*	(unknown)
Dam Rachel (GB) b. 1763	Blank b. 1740	Little Hartley Mare ch. 1727	Bartlett's Childers
Dam Rachel (GB) b. 1763	Blank b. 1740	Little Hartley Mare ch. 1727	Flying Whigg
Dam Rachel (GB) b. 1763	Regulus mare 1751	Regulus ch. 1739	Godolphin Arabian*
Dam Rachel (GB) b. 1763	Regulus mare 1751	Regulus ch. 1739	Grey Robinson
Dam Rachel (GB) b. 1763	Regulus mare 1751	Soreheels mare	Soreheels
Dam Rachel (GB) b. 1763	Regulus mare 1751	Soreheels mare	Makeless mare

Note: b. = Bay, blk. = Black, br. = Brown, ch. = Chestnut

* Highflyer is inbred 3D × 4D to the stallion Godolphin Arabian, meaning that he appears twice on the dam side of his pedigree, once in the third generation and once in the fourth generation.

== See also ==
- List of leading Thoroughbred racehorses
- Wellesley Arabian
