= John Bull (horse) =

British Thoroughbred racehorse

- Sire: Fortitude
- Grandsire: Herod
- Dam: Xantippe
- Damsire: Eclipse
- Sex: Stallion
- Foaled: 1789
- Country: Kingdom of Great Britain
- Colour: Chestnut
- Breeder: 1st Earl Grosvenor
- Owner: Lord Grosvenor
- Record: 3:2-0-0

Major wins
- Great Produce Stakes (1792); Epsom Derby (1792)

John Bull (1789–1812) was a British Thoroughbred racehorse and sire. In a career that lasted from April 1792 to April 1793, he ran three times and won two races. In 1792, he won the Great Produce Stakes on his racecourse debut and then took The Derby on his only other start of the year. He finished unplaced in his only subsequent race.

== Background ==
John Bull was "a very large, strong" chestnut horse bred by his owner Richard Grosvenor, 1st Earl Grosvenor. He was the second of seven foals bred by Lord Grosvenor from his mare Xantippe, a daughter of Eclipse.

== Racing career ==
=== 1792: three-year-old season ===
John Bull made his first appearance at the Newmarket Craven meeting early in 1792. The Great Produce Stakes was run over ten furlongs "Across the Flat" and attracted 35 entries, each paying 200 guineas, of which nine appeared to run in the race on 9 April. John Bull started the 5/4 favourite as part of a two-horse entry by Lord Grosvenor, and won beating Ormond and Hotspur, claiming a first prize of 4,200 guineas.

At Epsom on 24 May John Bull started the 4/6 favourite for the Derby in a field of seven runners, with Lord Derby's colt Bustard the second choice in the betting at 5/2. Ridden by Frank Buckle, he won from the 100/1 outsider Speculator, with Bustard third.

John Bull was scheduled to run a match race at Newmarket on 16 October against Lord Foley's four-year-old Vermin, the 1791 Derby runner-up. He was withdrawn from the match and Lord Grosvenor paid a 300 guinea forfeit to Lord Foley.

=== 1793: four-year-old season ===
More than ten months after his Derby win, John Bull reappeared at the 1793 Craven meeting where he ran in a four-mile Sweepstakes for four-year-olds, which attracted five other runners. He finished unplaced behind St. George, Speculator and Cayenne.

== Stud career ==
John Bull began his breeding career at Oxcroft near Balsham, Cambridgeshire. In 1796 he stood at a fee of 20 guineas in with a guinea for the groom, the same as the established stallion Potoooooooo at the same stud. A year later he was moved to Figdale, near Chester and his fee reduced to 15 guineas. From 1808 he was moved to Scotland where he stood at Auchins in Ayrshire at 10 guineas until at least 1810. John Bull died in the spring of 1812.

He was a successful sire of winners. John Bull was described as the second most popular stallion of his time, after Sir Peter Teazle.

Foaled	Name	Sex	Major Wins/Achievements
1795	Admiral Nelson	Stallion	
1802	Violante		
1809	Ardrossan		
	Lady Catherine	Mare	Dam of Copenhagen (Duke of Wellington's battle charger)

Copenhagen was the Duke's mount during the Battle of Waterloo, carrying him for 17 hours continuously during the battle.

== Sire line tree ==
- John Bull
  - Admiral Nelson
  - Alfred
  - Fortitude
  - Muley Moloch
  - Cesario
  - Gauntlet
    - Paddy Bull
  - Ardrossan
    - Sir Malichi Malagrowther

== Pedigree ==
Pedigree of John Bull (GB), chestnut stallion, 1789
Sire Fortitude (GB) 1777	Herod; 1758	Tartar	Partner
Sire Fortitude (GB) 1777	Herod; 1758	Tartar	Meliora
Sire Fortitude (GB) 1777	Herod; 1758	Cypron	Blaze
Sire Fortitude (GB) 1777	Herod; 1758	Cypron	Salome
Sire Fortitude (GB) 1777	Snap mare 1761	Snap	Snip
Sire Fortitude (GB) 1777	Snap mare 1761	Snap	sister to Slipby
Sire Fortitude (GB) 1777	Snap mare 1761	Milksop	Cade
Sire Fortitude (GB) 1777	Snap mare 1761	Milksop	Miss Partner
Dam Xantippe (GB) 1779	Eclipse; 1764	Marske	Squirt
Dam Xantippe (GB) 1779	Eclipse; 1764	Marske	The Ruby Mare
Dam Xantippe (GB) 1779	Eclipse; 1764	Spilletta	Regulus
Dam Xantippe (GB) 1779	Eclipse; 1764	Spilletta	Mother Western
Dam Xantippe (GB) 1779	Grecian Princess; 1770	Williams Forester	Croft's Forester
Dam Xantippe (GB) 1779	Grecian Princess; 1770	Williams Forester	Looby mare
Dam Xantippe (GB) 1779	Grecian Princess; 1770	Coalition colt mare	Coalition colt
Dam Xantippe (GB) 1779	Grecian Princess; 1770	Coalition colt mare	Bustard mare (Family:13)
