= Medora (horse) =

British-bred Thoroughbred racehorse

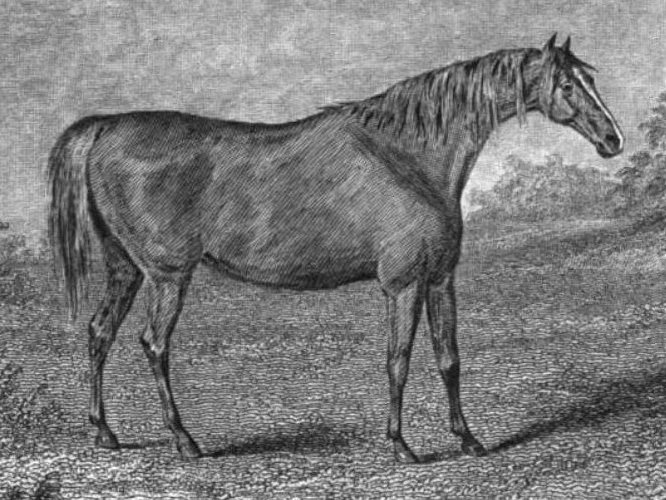
- Medora at stud c. 1828 by John Nott Sartorius
- Sire: Selim
- Grandsire: Buzzard
- Dam: Sir Harry mare
- Damsire: Sir Harry
- Sex: Mare
- Foaled: 1811
- Country: United Kingdom of Great Britain and Ireland
- Colour: Chestnut
- Breeder: Colonel Adeane
- Owner: John Manners, 5th Duke of Rutland; Thomas Cussans
- Trainer: R D Boyce
- Record: 13: 4-4-2

Major wins
- Oaks Stakes (1814); Swinley Forest Stakes (1814); Billingbear Stakes (1814)

Medora (1811–1835) was a British Thoroughbred racehorse and broodmare who won the classic Oaks Stakes at Epsom Downs Racecourse in 1814. In a racing career which lasted from April 1814 to May 1816, she ran thirteen times, won four races, and twice "received forfeit" when her opponent did not appear for a scheduled match race. Unraced as a two-year-old, Medora produced her best form in the first half of 1814, she finished third in the inaugural 1000 Guineas, won the Oaks and then claimed two races at Royal Ascot. She remained in training for two more seasons but was less successful, winning only one competitive race. She was retired to stud where she became a highly successful and influential broodmare, whose direct descendants won many major races throughout the 19th and 20th centuries.

== Background ==
Medora was a chestnut mare bred by Colonel Adeane and sold as a yearling to John Manners, 5th Duke of Rutland. Her sire Selim won the Craven Stakes and the Oatlands Stakes at Newmarket and went on to have a successful stud career, siring the classic winners Azor (Epsom Derby), the unnamed Filly by Selim (1000 Guineas), Nicolo (2000 Guineas), Turcoman (2000 Guineas) and Turquoise (Oaks) as well as the British Champion sire Sultan. Selim was British champion sire in 1814. Medora's dam was an unnamed mare sired by the Derby winner Sir Harry.

== Racing career ==
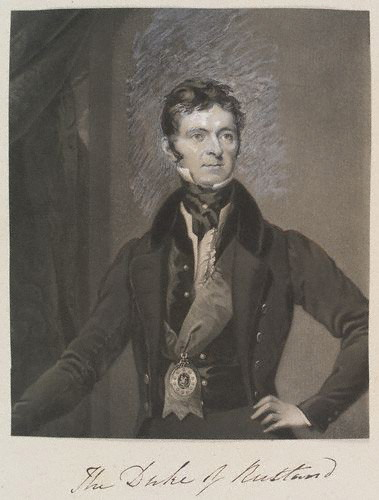
The 5th Duke of Rutland, owned Medora in 1814 and 1815

=== 1814: three-year-old season ===
Medora began her racing career on 26 April in the sixth running of the 2000 Guineas Stakes over the Rowley Mile course at Newmarket Racecourse. Despite being the only filly in the field and her lack of previous experience, she was made third favourite at odds of 7/1 against thirteen colts, but finished unplaced behind Mr Wyndham's Olive. Two days later Medora was one of five fillies, from an original entry of ten, to contest the inaugural running of the 1,000 Guineas over the Ditch Mile. She started 5/2 third favourite and finished third to Charlotte and the Duke of Grafton's Vestal.

On 27 May Medora was moved up in distance to contest the Oaks Stakes over one and a half miles at Epsom. The Duke of Grafton's Wire and Lord Grosvenor's Zadora were made joint favourites, with Medora relatively unfancied at odds of 10/1 in a field of nine fillies. Ridden by Sam Barnard, she won the classic from Vestal, with Wire in third place. At the Ascot meeting the following month, the Oaks winner ran twice. On the 9 June she defeated two opponents in the Windsor Forest Stakes over the Old Mile course, despite carrying a five pound weight penalty for her Epsom success. On the following afternoon she won the Billingbear Stakes over one and a half miles, conceding three pounds to General Gower's colt Mulatto.

After a break of almost four months, Medora returned for the autumn meetings at Newmarket where she had three engagements. On 6 October, the Duke of Rutland was able to claim a 200 guinea prize without having to race his filly when Mr Wyndham withdrew his colt from a match against Medora over the Abington Mile course. Eleven days later, on the opening day of the Second October meeting started 5/2 favourite for a sweepstakes over the Ditch Mile in which she was pitted against the Derby winner Blucher. She defeated her fellow classic winner, but both were beaten by the third runner, a four-year-old named Alcohol. Three days later Medora ended her season by finishing third to Partisan in a sweepstakes over five furlongs.

=== 1815: four-year-old season ===
Medora began the 1815 season, in which she ran exclusively at Newmarket, in the Port Stakes for four-year-old over two miles on 26 April. She finished last of the four runners behind Wire, Blucher and Wanderer. On 12 May the filly contested a five furlong sweepstakes. She started the even money favourite and won from Mr Wilson's colt Capricorn and three other runners.

Medora's only other run, after a break of more than five months, came on 18 October, when she ran in a division of the Oatlands Stakes, a handicap race over the Bunbury Mile. Carrying a weight of 115 pounds, she finished second to Castrella, with the 2000 Guineas winner Tigris in fourth.

=== 1816: five-year-old season ===
Before the start of the 1816 racing season Medora was sold to Thomas Cussans, but continued to race exclusively at Newmarket. Her first run for her new owner was scheduled to be a four furlong match against Skipjack on 1 May, but she was able to win the prize of 200 guineas without racing when her opponent was withdrawn. On the following afternoon, Medora contested a five furlong handicap in which she carried 124 pounds. She finished second to Lord Darlington's colt Sir Thomas, with the 1812 2000 Guineas winner Cwrw among the unplaced runners. On 13 May at the next meeting, Medora was beaten Lord Darlington's Paulus on a five furlong match and ended her career two days later by finishing fourth to Equator, Partisan and Cwrw in a ten furlong handicap.

== Stud record ==
Medora was retired to become a broodmare for Cussans, although she subsequently changed ownership several times. In all she produced fourteen live foals between 1818 and 1834. In the following year Medora was sold for export to Germany but died on the passage to her new home in autumn 1835.

The most immediately successful of Medora's offspring was the filly Gulnare (foaled in 1824, by Smolensko), who won the Oaks and went on to produce the 2000 Guineas winner The Corsair. Medora's lasting influence on the breed however, came through her third foal Pucelle (1821, by Muley). She was the ancestor of many important winners including The Ugly Buck (2000 Guineas), The Flea (1000 Guineas), Thebais (1000 Guineas and Oaks), Virago, War Cloud, Ribot, Sagaro and most importantly St Marguerite.

St Marguerite won the 1000 Guineas in 1882 and became the foundation mare of Thoroughbred family 4n. Members of this family, all of them direct female-line descendants of St Marguerite and Medora, include Seabreeze (1000 Guineas and St Leger), Rock Sand, Gallant Fox, Canonero II, Triptych, Generous and Imagine.

== Pedigree ==
Pedigree of Medora (GB), chestnut mare, 1811
Sire Selim (GB) 1802	Buzzard; 1787	Woodpecker	Herod*
Sire Selim (GB) 1802	Buzzard; 1787	Woodpecker	Miss Ramsden
Sire Selim (GB) 1802	Buzzard; 1787	Misfortune	Dux
Sire Selim (GB) 1802	Buzzard; 1787	Misfortune	Curiosity
Sire Selim (GB) 1802	Alexander mare 1790	Alexander	Eclipse*
Sire Selim (GB) 1802	Alexander mare 1790	Alexander	Grecian Princess
Sire Selim (GB) 1802	Alexander mare 1790	Highflyer mare	Highflyer*^
Sire Selim (GB) 1802	Alexander mare 1790	Highflyer mare	Alfred mare^
Dam Sir Harry mare (GB) 1803	Sir Harry; 1795	Sir Peter Teazle	Highflyer*^
Dam Sir Harry mare (GB) 1803	Sir Harry; 1795	Sir Peter Teazle	Papillon
Dam Sir Harry mare (GB) 1803	Sir Harry; 1795	Matron	Alfred^
Dam Sir Harry mare (GB) 1803	Sir Harry; 1795	Matron	Marske mare
Dam Sir Harry mare (GB) 1803	Volunteer mare 1793	Volunteer	Eclipse*
Dam Sir Harry mare (GB) 1803	Volunteer mare 1793	Volunteer	Tartar mare
Dam Sir Harry mare (GB) 1803	Volunteer mare 1793	sister to Petworth	Herod*
Dam Sir Harry mare (GB) 1803	Volunteer mare 1793	sister to Petworth	Golden Grove (Family 4-l)

^ Medora is inbred 4S x 5S x 5D x 4D to the stallion Herod, meaning that he appears fourth and fifth generation on the sire side of his pedigree and fifth and fourth generation on the dam side of her pedigree.

* Medora is inbred 4S x 4D to the stallion Highflyer, meaning that he appears fourth generation on the sire side of his pedigree and fourth generation on the dam side of her pedigree.

* Medora is inbred 4S x 4D to the stallion Eclipse, meaning that he appears fourth generation on the sire side of his pedigree and fourth generation on the dam side of her pedigree.

^ Medora is inbred 5S x 4D to the stallion Alfred, meaning that he appears fifth generation on the sire side of his pedigree and fourth generation on the dam side of her pedigree.
