= Parasol (horse) =

British Thoroughbred racehorse

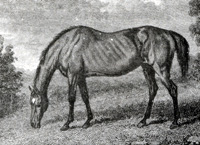
- Painting of Parasol
- Sire: Pot-8-Os
- Grandsire: Eclipse
- Dam: Prunella
- Damsire: Highflyer
- Sex: Mare
- Foaled: 1800
- Country: Great Britain
- Colour: Bay
- Breeder: 3rd Duke of Grafton
- Owner: 3rd Duke of Grafton
- Record: 35: 20-9-5

Major wins
- Town Plate (1803); Second Class Oatlands Stakes (1804); One-third Subscription of 25 gs (1804); Newmarket October King's Plate (1804, 1805) £50 Subscription at Newmarket (1805); Jockey-Club Plate (1805); One-third Subscription of 25 gs (1805) £50 race at Newmarket (1806); Match against Cardinal Beaufort (1806)

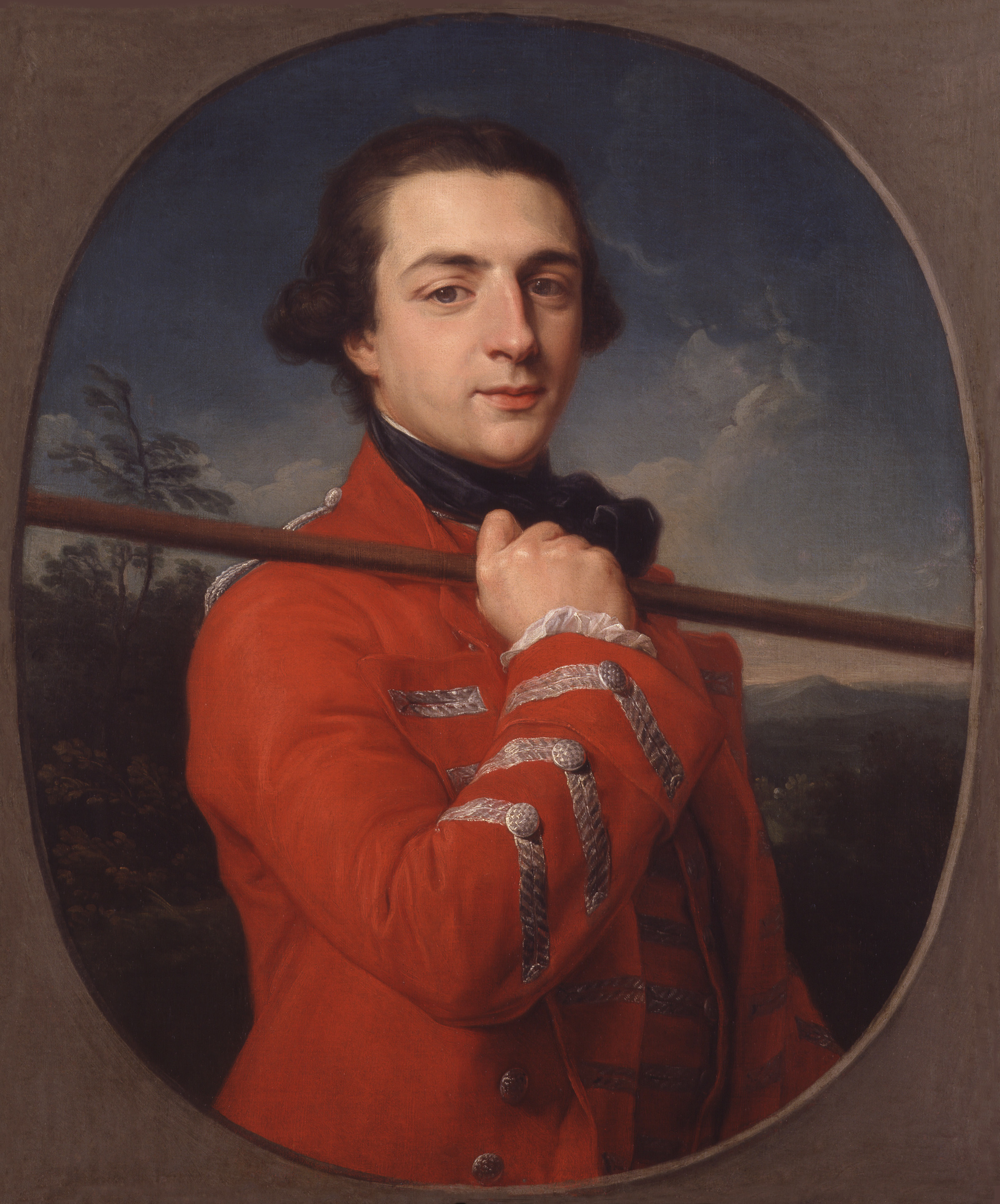
Parasol's owner, the 3rd Duke of Grafton

Parasol (1800–1826) was a British Thoroughbred racehorse. In total she won twenty of her thirty-five races, including two Newmarket First October King's Plates, the Jockey-Club Plate and a match race against Derby winner Cardinal Beaufort. Her only race away from Newmarket was for her début, in the Oaks Stakes in 1803. She was bred and owned by Augustus FitzRoy, 3rd Duke of Grafton. As a broodmare she foaled the stallion Partisan, 2000 Guineas winner Pindarrie and Pastille, who won both the 2000 Guineas and the Oaks.

== Background ==
Parasol was a bay filly bred by Augustus FitzRoy, 3rd Duke of Grafton, and foaled in 1800. She was sired by the successful racehorse Pot-8-Os. Pot-8-Os won many races including the 1200 Guineas Stakes and Craven Stakes. He later became a top sire, with his progeny including the three Derby winners Waxy, Champion and Tyrant. Parasol's dam was the leading broodmare Prunella, a daughter of the undefeated Highflyer. Prunella foaled the Oaks winner Pelisse and Derby winner Pope. She also produced the top broodmares Penelope, Pledge, Pawn, Pope Joan and Prudence. Parasol was Prunella's third foal.

== Racing career ==
=== 1803: Three-year-old season ===
Parasol made her first appearance on the track at Epsom Downs in the Oaks Stakes on 27 May, when she started as the 2/1 favourite. The race was won by Theophania, with a sister to Allegranti in second and Parasol in third place. At Newmarket's July meeting she won the Town Plate from Rumbo and two others. In October she was due to face three horses in a 100 guineas Sweepstakes at Newmarket, but all three paid a forfeit and the race never took place. The next day she won a race for One-third of a Subscription of 25 guineas each, beating four rivals. At the Second October meeting she beat the colt Orlando to win a £50 Subscription Plate. At the Third October meeting Parasol was due to face the filly Elizabeth in a match race, but Elizabeth was withdrawn.

=== 1804: Four-year-old season ===
Her first race of the 1804 season was the Second Class of the Oatlands Stakes at Newmarket. After starting the race favourite, she won from Hard-bargain in second, Lignum Vitae in third, and three others. Later in the month she was due to race 1802 Derby runner-up Young Eclipse, but Young Eclipse's owner paid a forfeit and the race never took place. At the same meeting she was due to race Eagle, but was withdrawn. In early May at Newmarket she received another forfeit, this time from the horse Malta, before beating Enchanter in a match race over one mile. Parasol didn't run again until Newmarket's First October meeting, when, starting as the odds-on favourite, she beat three rivals to win One third of a Subscription of 25 guineas each. Two days later she beat Sir Harry Dimsdale and Walton to win the King's Plate, run over almost four miles. She also collected a forfeit from Baron Foley's Watery, from a race that was due to be run later in the day. At the Second October meeting Parasol beat Buss in a two-mile match race. Later in the week she was entered in the Second Class of the October Oatlands Stakes, but never lined up. In her final race of the year she was beaten by Lennox over four miles.

=== 1805: Five-year-old season ===
Like in 1804, Parasol started the 1805 season in the Second Class of the Oatlands Stakes. She started the race as the favourite, but could only finish third, behind winner Giles and runner-up Duxbury. On 30 April at the Newmarket First Spring meeting she finished last of the three runners, behind winner Walton, in a £50 Subscription race over one mile. Later in the day she walked over for the King's Plate for five-year-old mares. On 1 May she won a £50 Subscription, where Hippocampus finished second and Houghton Lass third. At the Second Spring meeting she faced Walton and Petruchio in the Jockey-Club Plate.

Walton started the race as the 4/6 favourite, with Parasol second in the betting at 7/4. Parasol won the race from Walton, with Petruchio finishing last. After a few months off, Parasol returned to the track for the First October meeting. On the first day of the meeting she walked over for a Subscription of 5 guineas each, before collecting a forfeit from Pipylin. Two days later she walked over for a race work 50 guineas over the four-mile Beacon course. Another day later she walked over to win the King's Plate for the second year running. At the Second October meeting she beat Sir Harry Dimsdale to win a race for One-third Subscription of 25 guineas each over the Beacon course. This turned out to be her last race of the season, as she was withdrawn from the October Oatlands Stakes.

=== 1806: Six-year-old season ===
In the spring of 1806 Parasol received a forfeit from Hippocampus, and then received forfeits from the two other subscribers in a Sweepstakes of 200 guineas each at Newmarket. She made her reappearance on 22 April at Newmarket, where she beat Margery and Gloriana to win the King's Plate for mares. In the following race she beat Antipater in a £50 Subscription. In May she started as the odds-on favourite for the Jockey Club Plate at Newmarket, but could only finish third of the five runners. The race was won by Staveley. At Newmarket's July meeting she lost a match to Jerboa, before beating Sir Charles Bunbury's filly Lydia in a race worth £50 the next day.

As in previous years Parasol didn't run again until the Newmarket First October meeting, where she started at 3/1 in a 50 guineas race over four miles. The race was won by Orville, with Parasol second and Staveley third. The following day she received a 50 guineas forfeit Czar Peter. At the Second October meeting she beat Derby winner Cardinal Beaufort in a 200 guineas match race over the Beacon course. She was entered in the first class of the October Oatlands Stakes, which was run on the same day, but she was withdrawn. Selim won the race. At the Houghton meeting Parasol lost a match against Slipper and three days later she ran unplaced behind winner Pelisse in a Subscription Handicap Plate.

=== 1807: Seven-year-old season ===
Parasol started as the 2/1 favourite for the first class of the Oatlands Stakes on 30 March 1807. She finished the race in third place behind Hippomenes and Houghton Lass. There were four other runners in the race, including Orville and Quiz. This was her only run until the First October meeting, where she was beaten by Brainworm. The days later she was made favourite for the King's Plate. The race was won by Canopus, with Parasol second and Thumper finishing last of the three runners. At the second October meeting Parasol lost to Orville in a four-mile race for one third of a Subscription of 25 guineas each.

=== 1808: Eight-year-old season ===
In her first start as an eight-year-old, Parasol finished runner-up to Violante in the second class of the Oatlands Stakes. At the First Spring meeting she lost a match to Bacchanal, before beating Taurus over the Beacon course to win 100 guineas. This turned out to be her final race as her intended opponent, Thorn, was withdrawn from their match race to be run at the Second Spring meeting.

== Stud career ==
As a broodmare, Parasol produced twelve foals. They were:

- Parachute – a chestnut colt foaled in 1809 and sired by Sorcerer.
- Promise – a bay filly foaled in 1810 and sired by Walton. She was sent to Ireland.
- Partisan – a bay stallion foaled in 1811 and sired by Walton. He won several races at Newmarket and later became a stallion. His son Gladiator sired Doncaster Cup winner Sweetmeat.
- Walton colt – a bay colt foaled in 1812 who died young.
- 1813 Barren to Vandyke
- 1814 Barren to Walton
- Picaroon – a bay colt foaled in 1815 and sired by Selim. He died without siring a foal.
- 1816 Barren to Waxy
- Pindarrie – a bay colt foaled in 1817 and sired by Phantom. He won the 2000 Guineas in 1820 and was later sent to India.
- Polygar – a chestnut stallion foaled in 1818 and sired by Walton. His daughter Ada was the dam of Doncaster Cup winner Sabreur.
- Pastille – a bay filly foaled in 1819 and sired by Rubens. She won the 2000 Guineas and Oaks in 1822.
- Rubens filly – a chestnut filly foaled in 1820.
- 1821 Barren to Phantom
- Election filly – a chestnut filly foaled in 1822 who died as a foal.
- Parapluise – a bay filly foaled in 1823 and sired by Merlin.
- Paramour – a bay colt foaled in 1824 and sired by Merlin. He was sent abroad.
- 1825 Barren to Merlin
- 1826 Barren to Centaur

Parasol was shot in the autumn of 1826. She had been covered by the stallion Sam in the spring.

== Pedigree ==
Pedigree of Parasol, bay mare, 1800
Sire Pot-8-Os (GB) ch. 1773	Eclipse (GB) ch. 1764	Marske br. 1750	Squirt
Sire Pot-8-Os (GB) ch. 1773	Eclipse (GB) ch. 1764	Marske br. 1750	Blacklegs mare
Sire Pot-8-Os (GB) ch. 1773	Eclipse (GB) ch. 1764	Spilletta b. 1749	Regulus
Sire Pot-8-Os (GB) ch. 1773	Eclipse (GB) ch. 1764	Spilletta b. 1749	Mother Western
Sire Pot-8-Os (GB) ch. 1773	Sportsmistress (GB); 1765	Warren's Sportsman b. 1753	Cade
Sire Pot-8-Os (GB) ch. 1773	Sportsmistress (GB); 1765	Warren's Sportsman b. 1753	Silvertail
Sire Pot-8-Os (GB) ch. 1773	Sportsmistress (GB); 1765	Golden Locks	Oroonoko
Sire Pot-8-Os (GB) ch. 1773	Sportsmistress (GB); 1765	Golden Locks	Crab mare
Dam Prunella (GB) b. 1788	Highflyer (GB) b. 1774	Herod b. 1758	Tartar
Dam Prunella (GB) b. 1788	Highflyer (GB) b. 1774	Herod b. 1758	Cypron
Dam Prunella (GB) b. 1788	Highflyer (GB) b. 1774	Rachel; 1763	Blank*
Dam Prunella (GB) b. 1788	Highflyer (GB) b. 1774	Rachel; 1763	Regulus mare
Dam Prunella (GB) b. 1788	Promise (GB) br. 1768	Snap br. 1750	Snip
Dam Prunella (GB) b. 1788	Promise (GB) br. 1768	Snap br. 1750	Fox mare
Dam Prunella (GB) b. 1788	Promise (GB) br. 1768	Julia b. 1756	Blank*
Dam Prunella (GB) b. 1788	Promise (GB) br. 1768	Julia b. 1756	Partner mare

Note: b. = Bay, br. = Brown, ch. = Chestnut

* Parasol was inbred 4 × 4 to Blank. This means that the stallion appears twice in the fourth generation of her pedigree.
