= Pope Joan (horse) =

British-bred Thoroughbred racehorse

- Sire: Waxy
- Grandsire: Pot-8-Os
- Dam: Prunella
- Damsire: Highflyer
- Sex: Mare
- Foaled: 1809
- Country: Great Britain
- Colour: Bay
- Breeder: 3rd Duke of Grafton
- Owner: 3rd Duke of Grafton; 4th Duke of Grafton
- Record: 8: 4-0-2
- Earnings: 550 gs

Major wins
- Ipswich King's Plate (1812); Sweepstakes of 100 gs at Newmarket (1812)

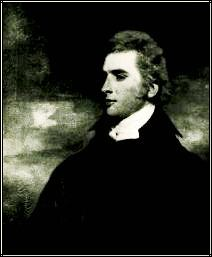
Pope Joan's owner the 4th Duke of Grafton

Pope Joan (1809–1830) was a British Thoroughbred racehorse. She won four of her eight starts before being retired to stud, where she became a successful broodmare. She foaled 1000 Guineas winner Tontine, 2000 Guineas winner Turcoman and Epsom Oaks winner Turquoise. Pope Joan was bred by Augustus FitzRoy, 3rd Duke of Grafton and after his death was owned by his son George FitzRoy, 4th Duke of Grafton.

== Background ==
Pope Joan was a bay filly bred by Augustus FitzRoy, 3rd Duke of Grafton, and foaled in 1809. She was sired by Waxy, who won The Derby in 1793. Waxy was also a successful stallion and was the leading sire in Great Britain and Ireland in 1810. Amongst his other progeny were Derby winners Pope, Whalebone, Blucher and Whisker. As well as the fillies Corinne, Minuet and Music. Pope Joan's dam, Prunella, was a daughter of the undefeated Highflyer. Prunella only won three races, but later became a very successful broodmare. She foaled Pope (mentioned above) and the successful broodmares Pledge and Prudence, who were full-siblings to Pope Joan. Prunella also foaled the mares Penelope, Parasol and Pelisse, who were half-sisters to Pope Joan.

== Racing career ==
=== 1812: Three-year-old season ===
In her first race, Pope Joan finished unplaced behind winner Cwrw in the 2000 Guineas Stakes at Newmarket on 14 April 1812. At the end of the month she finished third in £50 Handicap Plate, also at Newmarket. The race was won by the four-year-old filly Albuera. At the beginning of July she faced five opponents in the King's Plate at Ipswich, a race of three two-mile heats. After finishing second to Scout in the first heat, she won the last two to win the race. Scout was second and Spotless third. She then beat her only rival Thalestris to win the Queen's Plate at Chelmsford by winning the first two two-mile heats, therefore a third was not needed to be run. At Newmarket's First October meeting she won a Sweepstakes of 100 guineas each, beating Aquarius and Guadiana. Two days later she started as the odds-on favourite for a 25 guinea Subscription race. Ridden by T. Goodisson, she won easily from Calyba, with Lady Sophia finishing third.

=== 1813: Four-year-old season ===
In April 1813 Pope Joan finished unplaced in the first class of the Oatlands Stakes at Newmarket. The race was won by Venture. On 3 May she finished last of the three runners in the Newmarket First Spring King's Plate for mares over three miles. The race was won by Defiance, with Sorcery finishing second. Pope Joan was then retired to stud to be a broodmare for the Duke of Grafton. Throughout her racing career she won 550 guineas in prize money.

== Stud career ==
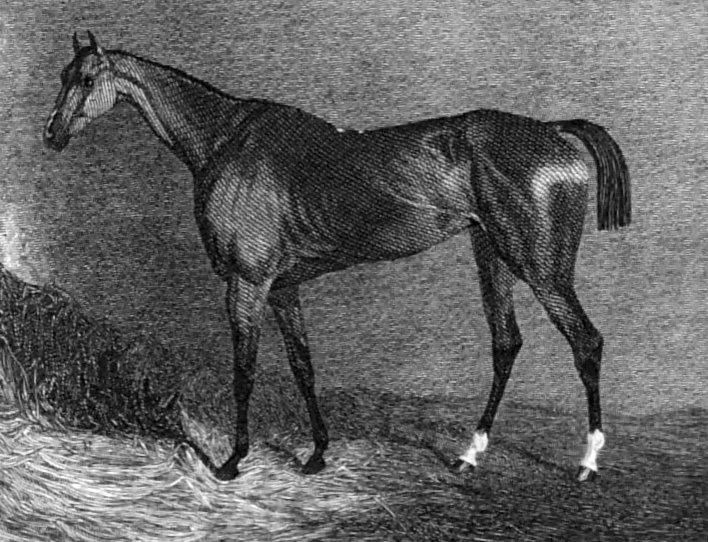
Pope Joan's daughter Turquoise

As a broodmare for the Duke of Grafton she produced fourteen foals. They were:

- Trictrac – a chestnut mare foaled in 1814 and sired by Dick Andrews. In 1817 she won two Sweepstakes races at Newmarket and finished third in the 1000 Guineas and fourth in the Oaks. The following year she won a King's Plate for mares and another race at Newmarket and two races at Huntingdon. In 1819 she won a King's Plate for mares at Richmond. As a broodmare she produced several foals.
- Tredrille – a chestnut mare foaled in 1815 and sired by Walton. She ran unplaced in the 1000 Guineas. Her daughter Manille was the graddam of Prix du Jockey Club winner Meudon.
- Proselyte – a brown colt foaled in 1816 and sired by Sorcerer.
- Trance – a bay stallion foaled in 1817 and sired by Phantom. He won three races in 1821 and one in 1822.
- Titian – a bay colt foaled in 1818 and sired by Rubens. He won a race at Newmarket and one at Ascot in 1821.
- Haphazard filly – a brown filly foaled in 1819 and sired by Haphazard. She died as a two-year-old.
- Talisman – a brown colt foaled in 1820 and sired by Soothsayer. He walked over for a Sweepstakes of 100 guineas each at Newmarket it 1823, which was his only win as a three-year-old.
- Tiara – a chestnut filly foaled in 1821 and sired by either Soothsayer or Castrel. In 1824 she finished second in the 2000 Guineas Stakes, before winning two races at Newmarket later in the year.
- Tontine – a chestnut mare foaled in 1822 and sired by Election. She walked over for the 1000 Guineas Stakes in 1825 and was later also a broodmare for the Duke of Grafton.
- 1823 Barren to Abjer
- Turcoman – a brown colt foaled in 1824 and sired by Selim. In 1827 he won the 2000 Guineas, before running unplaced in the Derby and finishing third in the St. Leger. He won three races in total as a three-year-old and was then sent to France.
- Turquoise – a brown mare foaled in 1825 and sired by Selim. She won the Oaks Stakes as a 25/1 outsider in 1828. She foaled Jericho, who was the sire of 2000 Guineas winner The Promised Land.
- Partisan filly – a brown filly foaled in 1826. She died when she was one week old.
- 1827 Barren to Merlin
- Blacklock mare – a black or brown mare foaled in 1828 and sired by Blacklock. She was put straight to stud, where she produced her first foal in 1832. She had six foals in total.
- 1829 Barren to Truffle
- Sultan filly – a bay filly foaled in 1830 and sired by Sultan. She was dead by 1834.
- 1831 Slipped Foal by St Patrick

Pope Joan died in 1830.

== Pedigree ==
Pedigree of Pope Joan, bay mare, 1809
Sire Waxy (GB) b. 1790	Pot-8-Os (GB) ch. 1773	Eclipse ch. 1764	Marske
Sire Waxy (GB) b. 1790	Pot-8-Os (GB) ch. 1773	Eclipse ch. 1764	Spilletta
Sire Waxy (GB) b. 1790	Pot-8-Os (GB) ch. 1773	Sportsmistress; 1765	Warren's Sportsman
Sire Waxy (GB) b. 1790	Pot-8-Os (GB) ch. 1773	Sportsmistress; 1765	Golden Locks
Sire Waxy (GB) b. 1790	Maria (GB) b. 1777	Herod* b. 1758	Tartar
Sire Waxy (GB) b. 1790	Maria (GB) b. 1777	Herod* b. 1758	Cypron
Sire Waxy (GB) b. 1790	Maria (GB) b. 1777	Lisette; 1772	Snap*
Sire Waxy (GB) b. 1790	Maria (GB) b. 1777	Lisette; 1772	Miss Windsor
Dam Prunella (GB) b. 1788	Highflyer (GB) b. 1774	Herod* b. 1758	Tartar
Dam Prunella (GB) b. 1788	Highflyer (GB) b. 1774	Herod* b. 1758	Cypron
Dam Prunella (GB) b. 1788	Highflyer (GB) b. 1774	Rachel; 1763	Blank*
Dam Prunella (GB) b. 1788	Highflyer (GB) b. 1774	Rachel; 1763	Regulus mare
Dam Prunella (GB) b. 1788	Promise (GB) br. 1768	Snap* br. 1750	Snip
Dam Prunella (GB) b. 1788	Promise (GB) br. 1768	Snap* br. 1750	Fox mare
Dam Prunella (GB) b. 1788	Promise (GB) br. 1768	Julia b. 1756	Blank*
Dam Prunella (GB) b. 1788	Promise (GB) br. 1768	Julia b. 1756	Partner mare

Note: b. = Bay, br. = Brown, ch. = Chestnut

* Pope Joan was inbred 3x3 to Herod. This means that the stallion appears twice in the third generation of her pedigree. She was also inbred 3x4 to Snap and 4x4 to Blank.
