= Pindarrie =

British Thoroughbred racehorse

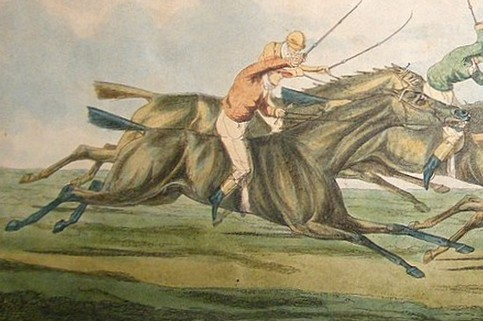
- Engraving of Pindarrie (foreground) running in the 1820 Derby
- Sire: Phantom
- Grandsire: Walton
- Dam: Parasol
- Damsire: Pot-8-Os
- Sex: Colt
- Foaled: 1817
- Country: Great Britain
- Colour: Bay
- Breeder: 4th Duke of Grafton
- Owner: 4th Duke of Grafton
- Trainer: Robert Robson
- Record: 5: 2-1-0
- Earnings: 3700 gs

Major wins
- Riddlesworth Stakes (1820); 2000 Guineas Stakes (1820)

Pindarrie (foaled 1817) was a British Thoroughbred racehorse. He raced five times and won the Riddlesworth Stakes and 2000 Guineas Stakes. He was owned by George FitzRoy, 4th Duke of Grafton, and trained by Robert Robson. He only raced in 1820 and was then sent to India.

== Background ==
Pindarrie was a bay colt bred by George FitzRoy, 4th Duke of Grafton, and foaled in 1817. He was sired by the Derby winner Phantom. Phantom was also a leading stallion, becoming British Champion sire in 1820 and 1824. He sired the Derby winners Cedric and Middleton, along with 2000 Guineas winner Enamel. He also sired Cobweb, who won the 1000 Guineas and Oaks and the Champion sire Taurus.

Pindarrie's dam was Parasol, a daughter of Pot-8-Os. Parasol was a successful racehorse who won twenty races, including the Oatlands Stakes, two First October King's Plates at Newmarket, the Jockey-Club Plate and a match race against Derby winner Cardinal Beaufort. As a broodmare she also produced the stallion Partisan and the 2000 Guineas and Oaks winner Pastille. Pindarrie was the sixth of her twelve foals. He was trained by Robert Robson.

== Racing career ==
Pindarrie's first race was the First Class of the Riddlesworth Stakes, run over one mile at Newmarket on 3 April 1820. Ridden by T. Goodisson, he started as the 5/2 second favourite and won easily from the colt by Comus, who finished second, and four others. Pindarrie then started as the odds-on favourite for the 2000 Guineas Stakes and was ridden by Frank Buckle. He faced four rivals and won the race easily from the Earl of Jersey's colt by Soothsayer. Three days later he started as the 1/3 favourite for the Newmarket Stakes. The race was won by Ivanhoe, with Pindarrie a length behind in second place and Clan-Albin finishing third.

Pindarrie then went to Epsom Downs for the Derby Stakes. Despite his defeat in the Newmarket Stakes, Pindarrie was sent off as the favourite. Also near the fore of the betting were Sailor and the unnamed filly by Selim. As the field passed Tattenham Corner, the 25/1 outsider Arbutus bolted when in a good position. This caused interference to both Anti-Gallican and Pindarrie. Sailor went on to win the race, which had been run at a fast pace, by two lengths from Abjer, with the colt by Middlethorpe third, the Selim filly fourth and Pindarrie fifth. The remainder of the fifteen runner field were a long way behind Pindarrie. On his final start he ran unplaced in the Newmarket St. Leger. At the end of the season he was retired and sent to India.

== Stud career ==
By January 1823, Pindarrie was standing at stud at Pultah Ghaut near Barrackpore, West Bengal, India for a price of 200 rupees per mare.

- Plunder- 1823 bay filly out of Gipsey
- Footpad- 1826 colt out of Maiden

== Pedigree ==
Pedigree of Pindarrie, bay colt, 1817
Sire Phantom (GB) b. 1808	Walton (GB) b. 1799	Sir Peter Teazle br. 1784	Highflyer*^
Sire Phantom (GB) b. 1808	Walton (GB) b. 1799	Sir Peter Teazle br. 1784	Papillon
Sire Phantom (GB) b. 1808	Walton (GB) b. 1799	Arethusa ch. 1792	Dungannon
Sire Phantom (GB) b. 1808	Walton (GB) b. 1799	Arethusa ch. 1792	Prophet mare
Sire Phantom (GB) b. 1808	Julia (GB) br. 1799	Whiskey b. 1789	Saltram^
Sire Phantom (GB) b. 1808	Julia (GB) br. 1799	Whiskey b. 1789	Calash
Sire Phantom (GB) b. 1808	Julia (GB) br. 1799	Young Giantess b. 1790	Diomed
Sire Phantom (GB) b. 1808	Julia (GB) br. 1799	Young Giantess b. 1790	Giantess
Dam Parasol (GB) b. 1800	Potoooooooo (GB) ch. 1773	Eclipse^ ch. 1764	Marske
Dam Parasol (GB) b. 1800	Potoooooooo (GB) ch. 1773	Eclipse^ ch. 1764	Spilletta
Dam Parasol (GB) b. 1800	Potoooooooo (GB) ch. 1773	Sportsmistress; 1765	Warren's Sportsman
Dam Parasol (GB) b. 1800	Potoooooooo (GB) ch. 1773	Sportsmistress; 1765	Golden Locks
Dam Parasol (GB) b. 1800	Prunella (GB) b. 1788	Highflyer*^ b. 1774	Herod^
Dam Parasol (GB) b. 1800	Prunella (GB) b. 1788	Highflyer*^ b. 1774	Rachel
Dam Parasol (GB) b. 1800	Prunella (GB) b. 1788	Promise br. 1768	Snap
Dam Parasol (GB) b. 1800	Prunella (GB) b. 1788	Promise br. 1768	Julia

Note: b. = Bay, br. = Brown, ch. = Chestnut

* Pindarre is inbred 4S x 3D to the stallion Highflyer, meaning that he appears fourth generation on the sire side of his pedigree and third generation on the dam side of his pedigree.

^ Middleton is inbred 5S x 6S x 4D to the stallion Herod, meaning that he appears fifth (via Highflyer) and sixth generation (via Diomed) on the sire side of his pedigree and fourth generation on the dam side of his pedigree.

^ Middleton is inbred 5S x 3D to the stallion Eclipse, meaning that he appears fifth generation (via Saltram) on the sire side of his pedigree and third generation on the dam side of his pedigree.
