= Zoe (horse) =

British-bred Thoroughbred racehorse

- Sire: Orville
- Grandsire: Beningbrough
- Dam: Nina
- Damsire: Selim
- Sex: Mare
- Foaled: 1825
- Country: United Kingdom
- Colour: Bay
- Breeder: William Lowther, 1st Earl of Lonsdale
- Owner: Joseph Rogers; Charles Greville; Arthur Molony
- Trainer: Robert Pettit
- Record: 9:5-1-1

Major wins
- Underley Stakes (1828); 1000 Guineas (1828)

Zoe (1825–1842) was a British Thoroughbred racehorse and broodmare who won the classic 1000 Guineas at Newmarket Racecourse in 1828. As a two-year-old Zoe won three of her four races and was sold twice after being successful in claiming races. In the following spring the filly won the 1000 Guineas but was unplaced when favourite for the Oaks Stakes, and was retired from racing after two defeats at Ascot Racecourse. Contemporary sources usually printed the horse's name as Zoè.

== Background ==
Zoe was a bay mare bred by William Lowther, 1st Earl of Lonsdale in 1825. Zoe was sired by Orville, a successful staying racehorse who excelled over extreme distances, winning the St Leger and Doncaster Cup in 1802. At stud he was Champion sire in 1817 and 1822 and sired the Classic winners Octavius (Derby), Emilius (Derby), Charlotte (1000 Guineas) and Ebor (St Leger).

Zoe was not a particularly attractive filly: a writer in the Sporting Magazine described her as "a lath-and-plaster thing...one of the worst to the eye I have ever seen".

== Racing career ==
=== 1827: two-year-old season ===
Zoe began her racing career at the Newmarket Second October meeting in the ownership of either Lord Lowther or Mr J Rogers. In the Clearwell Stakes over five furlongs she finished unplaced behind Thomas Thornhill's colt Merchant. Two weeks later, at the Newmarket Houghton meeting Zoe was entered in a Sweepstakes which carried the stipulation than the winner had to be offered for sale for 100 guineas. Ridden by Will Wheatley, Zoe won the race at odds of 6/5 from six opponents and was sold to Charles Greville. Two days later Zoe ran twice on the final day of the meeting, beginning with a win in a match race in which she defeated a three-year-old filly named Garnish. Later the same afternoon she ran in a Sweepstakes for two and three-year-olds, the winner of which was to be offered for sale for 200 guineas. Zoe won from a three-year-old gelding named Nonsuit and was sold for the second time in less than a week. The filly passed into the ownership of Arthur Molony although in some of her subsequent races she was described as being owned by her trainer Robert Pettit.

=== 1828: three-year-old season ===
23w Zoe began her three-year-old season in the Underley Stakes at the Newmarket Craven meeting on 10 April, in which she was ridden by James Robinson. She started at odds of 6/4 and won from the Duke of Portland's colt Brother with Zinganee, the favourite, finishing third of the four runners. Two weeks later, Zoe was one of seven fillies, from an original entry of nineteen, to contest the 1000 Guineas over the Ditch Mile course. She was made the 11/8 favourite ahead of Lord Jersey's filly Trampoline. Robinson restrained the filly in the early stages as the early pace was set by a filly named Zuleika before Trampoline went to the front with half a mile to run. Zoe was brought to the outside by Robinson in the closing stages and the favourite overtook Trampoline and pulled clear to win by two lengths. On 16 May, Zoe started the 5/2 favourite in a field of fourteen fillies for the Oaks over one and a half miles at Epsom Downs Racecourse. She was among the early leaders, but dropped out of contention before the turn into the straight and finished unplaced behind the 25/1 outsider Turquoise.

In the week following her defeat at Epsom, Zoe was sent to Ascot where she ran twice without success. On the second day of the meeting she returned to the one mile distance and started favourite for the Swinley Stakes but was easily beaten by the four-year-old filly Brocard. On the following day she finished last of the three runners behind Trampoline in the Windsor Forest Stakes.

== Stud record ==
Zoe was retired to become a broodmare for Mr Molony but changed ownership several times during her time at stud. She was covered by leading stallions including the Derby winner Pope but produced no notable winners. She was sold to Mr. Lichtwald in 1842, who attempted to export her to Germany but she died on the ship while en route.

== Pedigree ==
Pedigree of Zoe (GB), bay mare, 1825
Sire Orville (GB) 1799	Beningbrough; 1791	King Fergus	Eclipse
Sire Orville (GB) 1799	Beningbrough; 1791	King Fergus	Creeping Polly
Sire Orville (GB) 1799	Beningbrough; 1791	Fenwick's Herod mare	Herod
Sire Orville (GB) 1799	Beningbrough; 1791	Fenwick's Herod mare	Pyrrha
Sire Orville (GB) 1799	Evelina; 1791	Highflyer	Herod
Sire Orville (GB) 1799	Evelina; 1791	Highflyer	Rachel
Sire Orville (GB) 1799	Evelina; 1791	Termagant	Tantrum
Sire Orville (GB) 1799	Evelina; 1791	Termagant	Cantatrice
Dam Nina (GB) 1816	Selim; 1802	Buzzard	Woodpecker
Dam Nina (GB) 1816	Selim; 1802	Buzzard	Misfortune
Dam Nina (GB) 1816	Selim; 1802	Alexander mare	Alexander
Dam Nina (GB) 1816	Selim; 1802	Alexander mare	Highflyer mare
Dam Nina (GB) 1816	Penny Trumpet; 1796	Trumpator	Conductor
Dam Nina (GB) 1816	Penny Trumpet; 1796	Trumpator	Brunette
Dam Nina (GB) 1816	Penny Trumpet; 1796	Young Camilla	Woodpecker
Dam Nina (GB) 1816	Penny Trumpet; 1796	Young Camilla	Camilla (Family:11-b)

- Zoe was inbred 4 x 4 to Herod and Woodpecker, meaning that both these stallions appear twice in the fourth generation of her pedigree.
