= 1804 in sports =

1804 in sports describes the year's events in world sport.

== Boxing ==
Events

- English champion Jem Belcher remains inactive after losing an eye in 1803.

== Cricket ==
Events

- Homerton Cricket Club becomes a first-class team (until 1808).

England

- Most runs – Lord Frederick Beauclerk 258 (HS 94)
- Most wickets – Lord Frederick Beauclerk 17

== Horse racing ==
England

- The Derby – Hannibal
- The Oaks – Pelisse
- St Leger Stakes – Sancho
