= 1825 in sports =

1825 in sports describes the year's events in world sport.

== Baseball ==
Events

- "A baseball club, numbering nearly fifty members, met every afternoon during the ball playing season" in Rochester, New York, wrote Thurlow Weed in 1883 (Life of Thurlow Weed, vol. 1)

== Boxing ==
Events

- 19 July — Jem Ward takes the English Championship when he defeats Tom Cannon in the tenth round at Warwick.

== Cricket ==
Events

- On Thursday 28 July, a schools match at Lord's between Harrow and Winchester having just concluded, the pavilion burns down overnight with the consequent loss of valuable scorecards, records and trophies
- Inter-county cricket is revived for the first time since 1796 with Sussex playing two matches each against Hampshire and Kent. Hampshire and Kent do not play each other.

England

- Most runs – Jem Broadbridge 552 (HS 135)
- Most wickets – Jem Broadbridge 31 (BB 6–?)

== Horse racing ==
England

- 1,000 Guineas Stakes – Tontine
- 2,000 Guineas Stakes – Enamel
- The Derby – Middleton
- The Oaks – Wings
- St. Leger Stakes – Memnon
