= Bill Clift =

British jockey

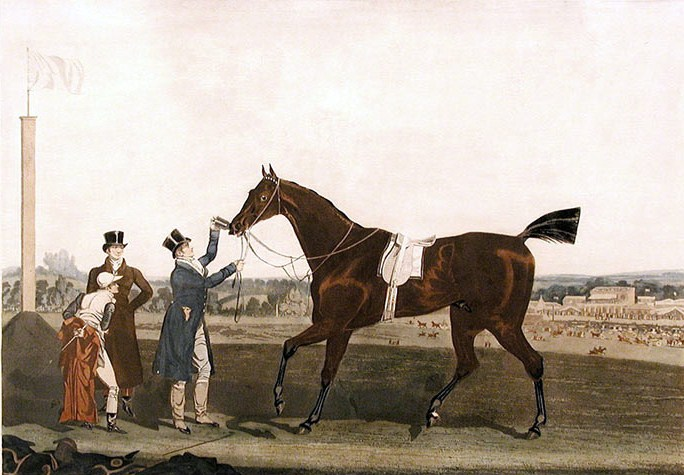
- Bill Clift (far left), with 1819 Derby winner, Tiresias

Personal information
- Born: 1762 Wentworth, South Yorkshire
- Died: 1840 (aged 77–78)
- Occupation: Jockey

Horse racing career
- Sport: Horse racing

Major racing wins
- British Classic Race wins as jockey: 1,000 Guineas (1814, 1815); 2,000 Guineas (1809, 1818); Epsom Oaks (1804, 1808); Epsom Derby (1793, 1800, 1803, 1810, 1819); St. Leger (1807, 1810)

Significant horses
- Champion, Ditto, Tiresias, Waxy, Whalebone

William Clift (1762–1840), born Wentworth, South Yorkshire, was a British jockey. He won the first runnings of both the 1,000 Guineas and 2,000 Guineas and was the first jockey to win all five of the British Classics.

== Early life ==
Clift was born at Wentworth Park, Yorkshire, on the estate of the Marquess of Rockingham. As a young boy, he worked as a shepherd on the estate. His start in racing came during one of the Marquess's house parties, when the host decided to organise a pony race. As the race was short of riders, Clift was conscripted to ride for a Mr Fowlston. Clift won the race convincingly and Rockingham invited him to join his private stable, under the guidance of trainer Christopher Scaife. When Scaife moved the stable to Newmarket, Clift moved too.

== Career ==
Clift rode for many wealthy patrons, including the Duke of Dorset, Duke of Grafton and Duke of Portland. His first Classic win came for Sir Ferdinand Poole on Waxy in the 1793 Derby. Seven years later, he got a second Derby win on Champion, although he missed the St. Leger win on the same horse. In 1803, he won a third Derby on Ditto. He won the first of two Oaks for the Duke of Grafton on Pelisse in 1804 and the second on Morel in 1808. Clift notably won the inaugural runnings of both the Newmarket Classics – the 1,000 Guineas and 2,000 Guineas. On both occasions he was riding for Christopher Wilson.

He returned to his roots for his 1807 St. Leger victory, riding for the Earl Fitzwilliam, who had inherited the Wentworth estate from his uncle. It was also the only Classic he won for his old trainer, Christopher Scaife. He continued to ride on a retainer from the Earl, before later becoming trainer to him, with his son Thomas as assistant.

His last classic came on Tiresias in 1819.

On retirement, he had three pensions – £30 a year from the Earl Fitzwilliam, £50 a year from the Duke of Portland and £50 from Christopher Wilson. Aged 80, he would walk from Newmarket to Bury St. Edmunds and back, "just to give my legs a stretch".

== Riding style ==
Clift has been described as "a rider of singularly little polish... [who] punished his mounts severely and would race neck and neck from start to finish with anything else that wanted to make the running" He "doffed his cap to no man" and, once, when asked by the Duke of Dorset what he thought of the horse he had just ridden, he replied, "You see I won; that's enough for you!"

== Classic race victories ==
(United Kingdom) Great Britain

- 1,000 Guineas – (2) – Charlotte (1814), Filly by Selim (1815)
- 2,000 Guineas – (2) – Wizard (1809), Interpreter (1818)
- Epsom Oaks – (2) – Pelisse (1804), Morel (1808)
- Epsom Derby – (5) – Waxy (1793), Champion (1800), Ditto (1803), Whalebone (1810), Tiresias (1819)
- St. Leger – (2) – Paulina (1807), Octavian (1810)

== Bibliography ==
- Mortimer, Roger; Onslow, Richard; Willett, Peter (1978). Biographical Encyclopaedia of British Racing. London: Macdonald and Jane's. ISBN 0-354-08536-0.
- Wright, Howard (1986). The Encyclopaedia of Flat Racing. London: Robert Hale. ISBN 0-7090-2639-0.
- Tanner, Michael; Cranham, Gerry (1992). Great Jockeys of the Flat. Enfield, Middlesex: Guinness Publishing. ISBN 0-85112-989-7.
