= Azor (horse) =

British-bred Thoroughbred racehorse

- Sire: Selim
- Grandsire: Buzzard
- Dam: Zoraida
- Damsire: Don Quixote
- Sex: Stallion
- Foaled: 1814
- Country: United Kingdom of Great Britain and Ireland
- Colour: Chestnut
- Breeder: John Payne
- Owner: John Payne
- Trainer: Robert Robson
- Record: 5:2-2-0

Major wins
- Epsom Derby (1817)

Azor (foaled 1814) was a British Thoroughbred racehorse. In a career that lasted from April to October 1817 he ran five times and won two races. In the summer of 1817 he created a 50/1 upset by winning The Derby after being entered in the race to act as a pacemaker for a more highly regarded stable companion. The rest of his form was well below top class, with his only other success coming when he was allowed to walk over at Newmarket.

== Background ==
Azor was a chestnut horse bred by his owner John Payne. Payne also owned Azor's dam Zoraida and his older sister Zora who won a race at Newmarket and finished second in the Riddlesworth Stakes in 1815. Azor's sire Selim won the Craven Stakes and the Oatlands Stakes at Newmarket and went on to have a successful stud career, siring the classic winners Medora (Epsom Oaks), Nicolo (2000 Guineas), Turcoman (2000 Guineas), the filly by Selim (1000 Guineas) and Turquoise (Oaks) as well as the British Champion sire Sultan. He was trained by Robert Robson, who sent out the winners of thirty-four Classics from his stable at Newmarket, Suffolk. Azor was the first notable winner for James "Jem" Robinson, who went on to win twenty-four classics including a record six Epsom Derbies.

== Racing career ==
=== 1817: three-year-old season ===
Azor did not race as a two-year-old, and made his first racecourse appearance at the Newmarket Craven meeting. On 12 April he ran in the Billingbear Stakes, a 100 guinea race for three-year-olds over the Ditch Mile course. He was not among the favourites and finished unplaced behind The Flyer.

On 22 May, Azor started as a 50/1 outsider for the Derby at Epsom. The Student, trained like Azor by Robert Robson, started the 7/4 favourite in a field of thirteen runners. Azor was thought to be in the race to act as a pacemaker for The Student and Jem Robinson was ordered to take the ride by his employer to prevent him from riding for a rival trainer. When Azor set off in front he was ignored by the other jockeys and allowed to build up a huge lead. Although his margin was reduced in the straight, he hung on to win from Young Wizard, another 50/1 outsider. His victory was considered the most inexplicable upset in the race up to that time. Following his Epsom win Azor was sent to the Newmarket July meeting for a 200 guinea Sweepstakes. He was allowed to walk over when his two opponents, both owned by the Duke of Grafton, were withdrawn.

Azor returned to Newmarket in autumn for two races at the "First October" meeting. On 30 September he ran in a 200 guinea match race over ten furlongs against the five-year-old Anticipation. He was beaten by the older horse despite carrying twenty-eight pounds less than his rival. Two days later, Azor finished second of the six runners behind Fitz-Orville in the two mile Town Plate.

== Stud career ==
Azor did not race after his defeats at Newmarket in autumn 1817 and late in the following year he was offered for sale as a potential stallion. According to the General Stud Book Azor was exported to Austria ("sent to Vienna").

== Pedigree ==
Pedigree of Azor (GB), chestnut stallion, 1814
Sire Selim (GB) 1802	Buzzard; 1787	Woodpecker	Herod
Sire Selim (GB) 1802	Buzzard; 1787	Woodpecker	Miss Ramsden
Sire Selim (GB) 1802	Buzzard; 1787	Misfortune	Dux
Sire Selim (GB) 1802	Buzzard; 1787	Misfortune	Curiosity
Sire Selim (GB) 1802	Alexander mare 1790	Alexander	Eclipse*
Sire Selim (GB) 1802	Alexander mare 1790	Alexander	Grecian Princess*
Sire Selim (GB) 1802	Alexander mare 1790	Highflyer mare	Highflyer
Sire Selim (GB) 1802	Alexander mare 1790	Highflyer mare	Alfred mare
Dam Zoraida (GB) 1806	Don Quixote; 1784	Eclipse*	Marske
Dam Zoraida (GB) 1806	Don Quixote; 1784	Eclipse*	Spilletta
Dam Zoraida (GB) 1806	Don Quixote; 1784	Grecian Princess*	Williams' Forester
Dam Zoraida (GB) 1806	Don Quixote; 1784	Grecian Princess*	Coalition colt mare
Dam Zoraida (GB) 1806	Lady Cow; 1800	John Bull	Fortitude
Dam Zoraida (GB) 1806	Lady Cow; 1800	John Bull	Xantippe
Dam Zoraida (GB) 1806	Lady Cow; 1800	Drone mare	Drone
Dam Zoraida (GB) 1806	Lady Cow; 1800	Drone mare	Lardella (Family:25)

* Azor is inbred 4S x 3D to the stallion Eclipse, meaning that he appears fourth generation on the sire side of his pedigree and third generation on the dam side of his pedigree.

* Azor is inbred 4S x 3D to the mare Grecian Princess, meaning that she appears fourth generation on the sire side of his pedigree and third generation on the dam side of his pedigree.
