= Turcoman (horse) =

British Thoroughbred racehorse

- Sire: Selim
- Grandsire: Buzzard
- Dam: Pope Joan
- Damsire: Waxy
- Sex: Stallion
- Foaled: 1824
- Country: United Kingdom of Great Britain and Ireland
- Colour: Brown
- Breeder: George FitzRoy, 4th Duke of Grafton
- Owner: 1) Duke of Grafton; 2) Lord Henry Seymour
- Trainer: Robert Stephenson

Major wins
- 2000 Guineas (1827)

Turcoman (1824 – 12 April 1846) was a British Thoroughbred racehorse notable for winning the 2000 Guineas Stakes in 1827.

== Background ==
Turcoman was sired by Selim, who had won the Craven Stakes and the Oatlands Stakes at Newmarket. Selim was British champion sire in 1814, siring the classic winners Azor (Epsom Derby), Medora (Oaks), Nicolo (2000 Guineas), and the filly by Selim (1000 Guineas) as well as the British Champion sire Sultan. Turcoman's dam, Pope Joan, was a successful broodmare that also produced Tontine (1000 Guineas) and his full-sister Turquoise (Oaks), among many other winners. Turcoman was Pope Joan's tenth foal out of 14 offspring produced before her death in 1830.

== Racing career ==
=== 1828: four-year-old season ===
Turcoman was sold to Lord Henry Seymour, the founder of the French Jockey Club and the second son of the Marquess of Hertford, in 1828 and was briefly exported to France. Lord Henry bought Turcoman and the colt Link Boy (winner of the 1827 Goodwood Cup) specifically to race against the five-year-old French mare Vittoria (sired by Milton out of Geane), owned by the Duke of Guiche. Vittoria later produced the winners Romulus (Prix du Jockey Club), Nautilus (Grand Prix and three-time Prix du Cadran) and Vegogne (Prix de Diane). Turcoman won a 2000-meter match race on the Champ-de-Mars against the horse Flamingo, but the win was disputed. Lord Henry sold Turcoman to Mr. Payne two days before he received notice of a rematch race from Guiche. Payne returned Turcoman to Great Britain for the 1829 season.

== Breeding career ==
After returning from France, Turcoman stood at Finnebrogue House, near Downpatrick for much of the 1830s and 40s, commanding a fee of between four and five guineas. Turcoman died of a kidney ailment on 12 April 1846 while under the ownership of a Mr. Stanier, who lived at Horton, near Wem, Shropshire.
