= Prunella (horse) =

British Thoroughbred racehorse

- Sire: Highflyer
- Grandsire: Herod
- Dam: Promise
- Damsire: Snap
- Sex: Mare
- Foaled: 1788
- Country: Great Britain
- Colour: Bay
- Breeder: 3rd Duke of Grafton
- Owner: 3rd Duke of Grafton
- Record: 11: 3-4-2

Major wins
- Sweepstakes of 200 gs at Newmarket (1791)
- Last updated on 29 December 2012

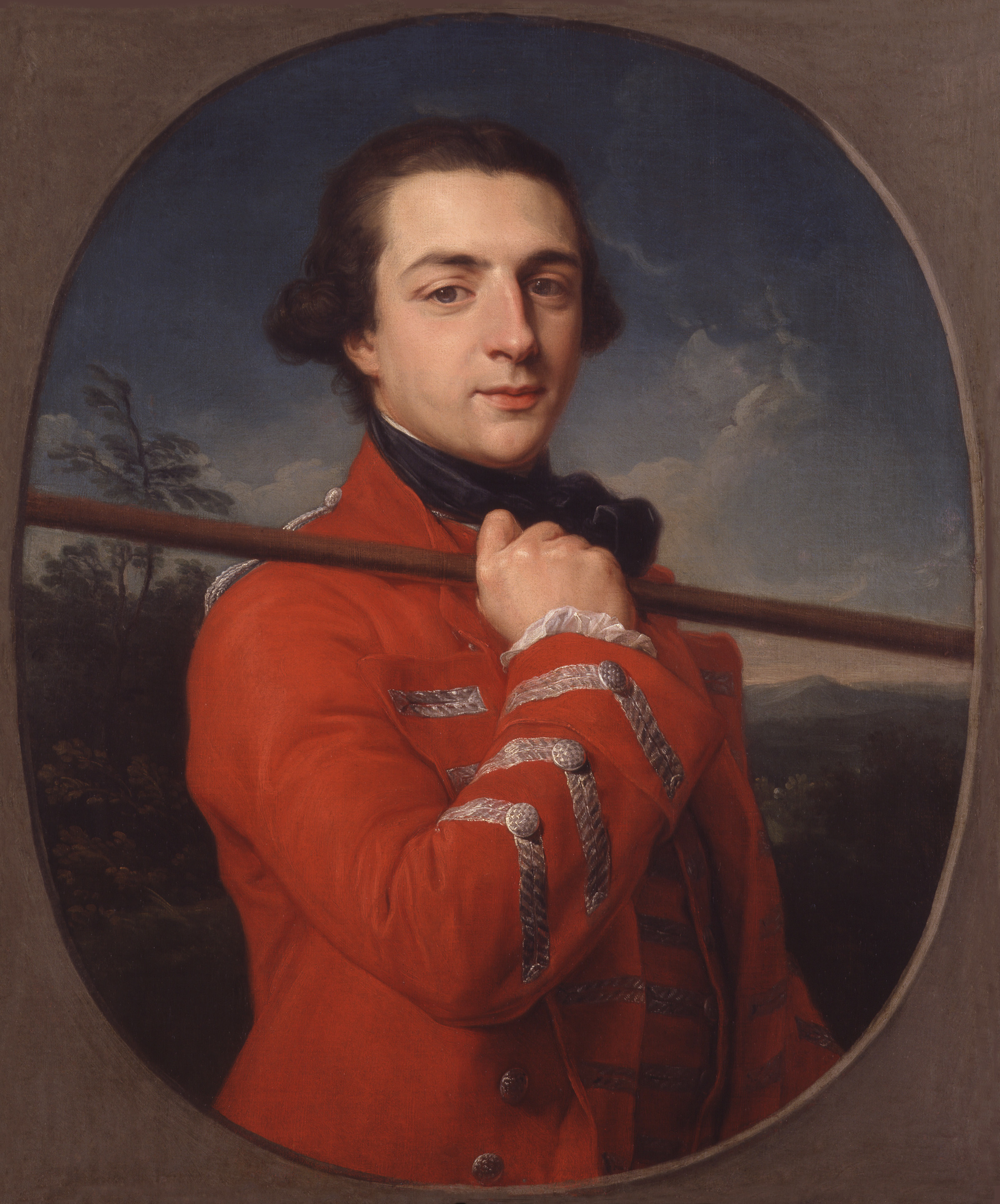
Prunella's owner, the 3rd Duke of Grafton

Prunella (1788 – December 1811) was a British Thoroughbred racehorse. Raced from 1791 to 1794, she won three races including a Sweepstakes of 200 guineas each at Newmarket. She was retired to stud and became an influential broodmare, foaling Epsom Derby winner Pope and Epsom Oaks winner Pelisse. Her daughters also went on to become top broodmares in their own right. She was owned by Augustus FitzRoy, 3rd Duke of Grafton.

== Background ==
Prunella was a bay filly bred by the 3rd Duke of Grafton and foaled in 1788. She was sired by the undefeated Great Subscription Purse winner Highflyer. Highflyer was also a top stallion, becoming Champion sire thirteen times. He sired three Epsom Derby winners in Noble, Sir Peter Teazle and Skyscraper along with several other classic winners. Sir Peter Teazle also became an important stallion. Prunella's dam was Promise, a daughter of Champion sire Snap.

== Racing career ==
=== 1791: Three-year-old season ===
Prunella made her racecourse debut at Epsom Downs on 10 June 1791, when she finished unplaced behind winner Portia in the Oaks Stakes. Her next race came in October at Newmarket, where she faced two opponents in a Sweepskates of 200 guineas each over two miles. Baron Foley's colt Vermin started as the odds on favourite, with both Prunella and Mopsey priced at 4/1. Prunella won the race, with Vermin finishing second. Two weeks later she lost a match race against Earl Grosvenor's filly Sylph worth 200 guineas, with both fillies carrying the same weight.

=== 1792: Four-year-old season ===
In April 1792 Prunella beat Mopsey at Newmarket for 25 guineas. At the Newmarket Second October meeting she lost to Sir John Lade's Clifden in a Sweepstakes of 25 guineas each. At the Houghton meeting she raced against six rivals in a Handicap Sweepstakes of 50 guineas each. The race was won by Mystery, with Speculator in finishing in second and Prunella in third place. Her final race of the season came in a £50 Handicap Plate at Newmarket. Prunella finished the race in third place of the twelve runners. Sir Frank Standish's filly Fairy won the race and Quetlavaca finished second.

=== 1793: Five-year-old season ===
Her first race as a five-year-old was the King's Plate for mares at Newmarket in April 1793. She finished second to the Earl of Clermont's filly Peggy, beating Amelia, Kezia and Magnolia. Her only other race of the season was at Huntingdon, where she faced two rivals in a £50 race comprising two four-mile heats. Prunella won both heats, with Bustler finishing second in both and Pill-box last.

=== 1794: Six-year-old season ===
At the Newmarket Craven meeting in April 1794 she finished unplaced behind winner Lurcher in the first class of the Oatlands Stakes. Her final race came at Newmarket's First Spring meeting in early May in the King's Plate for 100 guineas. Peggy started as the 4/6 favourite, with Kezia at 4/1, Prunella at 6/1 and Gipsy at 12/1. Peggy won the race from Prunella, with Gipsy third and Kezia last of the four runners.

== Stud career ==
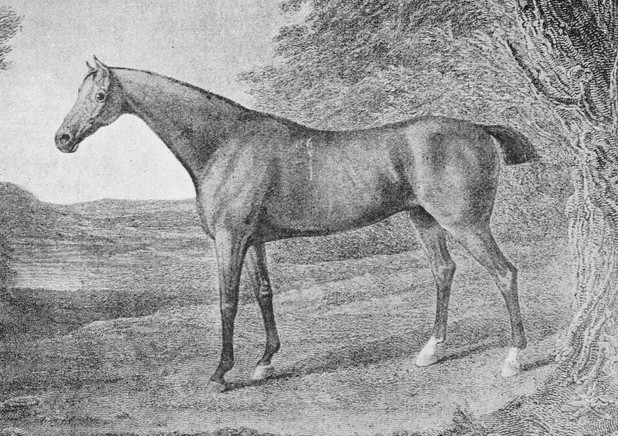
Prunella's daughter Penelope

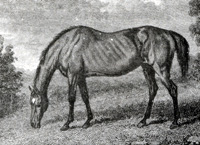
Prunella's daughter Parasol

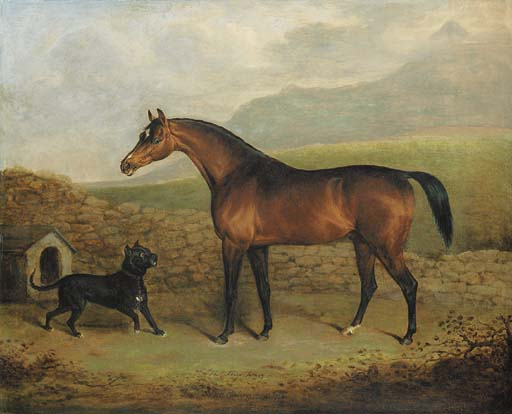
Prunella's son Pope

Retired to stud after the 1794 season, Prunella became a very influential broodmare. Only one of her daughters that lived to produce a foal failed to produce a classic winner. In total she produced twelve foals. They were:

Foaled	Name	Sex	Major Wins/Achievements
1796	Trumpator Filly	Mare	Killed when she was young
1798	Penelope	Mare	Dam of Whalebone, Whisker, Whizgig
1800	Parasol	Mare	Won 30 races. Dam of Pastille, Pindarrie
1801	Pelisse	Mare	Epsom Oaks (1804).
1803	Podargus	Stallion	2nd in the Newmarket Stakes
1804	Pioneer	Stallion	Damsire of Galata
1806	Pope	Stallion	Epsom Derby (1809)
1807	Pledge	Mare	Dam of Tiresias
1808	Pawn	Mare	Dam of Problem
1809	Pope Joan	Mare	Dam of Tontine, Turcoman, Turquoise
1810	Piquet	Mare	Dam of Loo
1811	Prudence	Mare	Never raced. Dam of Reginald, Rowena, Rebecca, Rufus

Prunella died in December 1811 at the Duke of Grafton's stud at Euston in Suffolk.

== Pedigree ==
Pedigree of Prunella, bay mare, 1788
Sire Highflyer (GB) b. 1774	Herod (GB) b. 1758	Tartar; 1743	Partner*
Sire Highflyer (GB) b. 1774	Herod (GB) b. 1758	Tartar; 1743	Meliora
Sire Highflyer (GB) b. 1774	Herod (GB) b. 1758	Cypron; 1750	Blaze
Sire Highflyer (GB) b. 1774	Herod (GB) b. 1758	Cypron; 1750	Salome
Sire Highflyer (GB) b. 1774	Rachel (GB); 1763	Blank*; 1740	Godolphin Arabian
Sire Highflyer (GB) b. 1774	Rachel (GB); 1763	Blank*; 1740	Little Hartley Mare
Sire Highflyer (GB) b. 1774	Rachel (GB); 1763	Regulus mare 1751	Regulus
Sire Highflyer (GB) b. 1774	Rachel (GB); 1763	Regulus mare 1751	Soreheels mare
Dam Promise (GB) br. 1768	Snap (GB) br. 1750	Snip; 1736	Flying Childers
Dam Promise (GB) br. 1768	Snap (GB) br. 1750	Snip; 1736	Basto mare
Dam Promise (GB) br. 1768	Snap (GB) br. 1750	Fox mare	Fox
Dam Promise (GB) br. 1768	Snap (GB) br. 1750	Fox mare	Gipsey
Dam Promise (GB) br. 1768	Julia (GB) b. 1756	Blank*; 1740	Godolphin Arabian
Dam Promise (GB) br. 1768	Julia (GB) b. 1756	Blank*; 1740	Little Hartley Mare
Dam Promise (GB) br. 1768	Julia (GB) b. 1756	Partner mare 1735	Partner*
Dam Promise (GB) br. 1768	Julia (GB) b. 1756	Partner mare 1735	Bay Bolton mare

Note: b. = Bay, br. = Brown

* Prunella was inbred 3x3 to Blank. This means that the stallion appears twice in the third generation of her pedigree. She was also inbred 4x4 to Partner.
