= Sir Harry =

Sir Harry is the name given to nine different Thoroughbred racehorses as of 1943.

- Sir Harry (British horse), English racehorse and Epsom Derby winner, foaled in 1795
- Sir Harry (Canadian horse), won the 1927 Coffroth Handicap, the then richest race in the North America, foaled in 1924
