= Turquoise (horse) =

British Thoroughbred racehorse

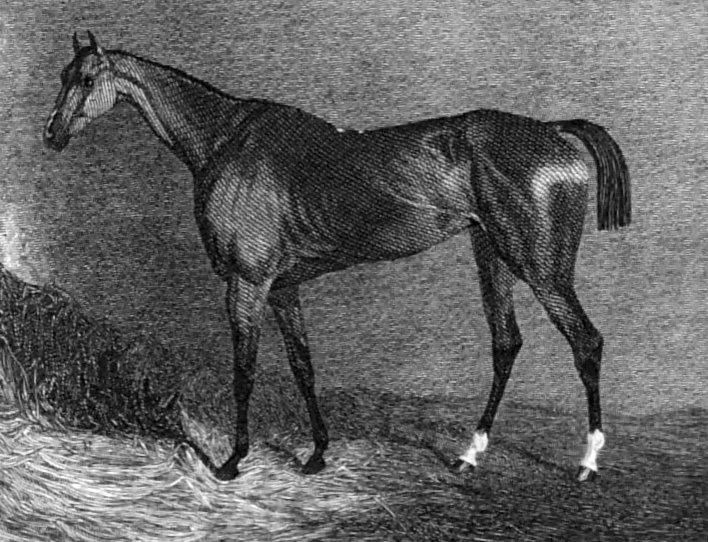
- Sire: Selim
- Grandsire: Buzzard
- Dam: Pope Joan
- Damsire: Waxy
- Foaled: 1825
- Country: United Kingdom of Great Britain and Ireland
- Colour: Brown
- Breeder: George FitzRoy, 4th Duke of Grafton
- Owner: Duke of Grafton
- Trainer: Robert Stephenson
- Record: 18:11-5-1

Major wins
- Oaks Stakes (1828); Town Purse (Newmarket) (1828); Town Plate (Newmarket) (1828); King's Plate (Chelmsford) (1829)

Turquoise (1825–1846) was a British Thoroughbred racehorse and broodmare who won the classic Oaks Stakes at Epsom Downs Racecourse in 1828. In a racing career which lasted from April 1828 until April 1830 she ran eighteen times, winning eleven races and finishing second on five occasions. As a three-year-old in 1828 she failed to attract a bid after winning a claiming race at Newmarket but then created an upset by winning the Oaks at odds of 25/1. She went on to prove herself a leading stayer, winning three more races before the end of the season. In 1829 she won five more races including three walkovers when no horses appeared to challenge her. She was retired after a single unsuccessful run in 1830.

== Background ==
Turquoise was a small, lightly-built brown mare with white socks on her hind feet bred by her owner the 4th Duke of Grafton at his stud at Euston Hall in Suffolk. Her sire Selim won the Craven Stakes and the Oatlands Stakes at Newmarket and went on to have a successful stud career, siring the classic winners Azor (Epsom Derby), Medora (Oaks), Nicolo (2000 Guineas), Turcoman (2000 Guineas) and the filly by Selim (1000 Guineas) as well as the British Champion sire Sultan. Selim was British champion sire in 1814.

Turquoise's dam Pope Joan was a daughter of Prunella, described as one of the most important broodmares in the history of the Thoroughbred breed. Pope Joan herself was a successful broodmare, producing several other good winners, all of whose names began with the letter "T", including Tontine (1000 Guineas), Turcoman, Trictrac, Tiara, Trance, Titian and Talisman. Grafton sent the filly to be trained at Newmarket by Robert Robson, the so-called "Emperor of Trainers". After Robson's retirement in early 1828 the training of the filly was taken over by Robert Stephenson.

== Racing career ==
=== 1828: three-year-old season ===
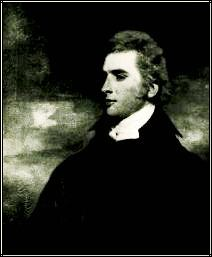
The Duke of Grafton, who bred and owned Turquoise

Although Turquoise was unraced as a two-year-old, she was highly regarded and began 1828 as one of the favourites for the Oaks. Her first race was a four-runner Sweepstakes at the Newmarket Craven meeting in April which proved highly unsatisfactory. She finished third to Lord Jersey's filly Trampoline after one of the runners had been left behind at the start. The judge ruled that a false start had occurred and ordered that the race should be re-run. Grafton declined to run his filly in the second race, which was also won by Trampoline. Turquoise won her two remaining races at Newmarket that spring. The ground at the First Spring meeting was slow and heavy after persistent rain and Turquoise was not impressive in beating her only rival, an unnamed filly by Whalebone in a "wretchedly slow" race. At the Second Spring meeting in May Turquoise contested a £50 selling plate over two miles and won from six opponents. As a condition of winning the race, the filly was offered for sale for 200 guineas but attracted no interest.

The Oaks Stakes at Epsom on 16 May attracted an entry of seventy-eight entries of which fourteen appeared to contest the mile and a half race. Despite her previous high reputation and proven stamina, Turquoise was virtually ignored, and started a 25/1 outsider as the 1000 Guineas winner Zoe was made 5/2 favourite. The race began after several false starts, and Mr Rawlinson's filly Ruby went to the front. On the turn into the straight Ruby opened up a lead of several lengths but Turquoise, "most judiciously" ridden by John Barham Day, overtook her in the closing stages and won by two lengths. The Sporting Magazine was not impressed, describing Turquoise as an indifferent filly who had beaten "a wretched lot". On her next appearance, Turquoise ran in the Town Purse at the Newmarket July meeting. Ridden by Frank Buckle Jr., she started the 6/4 favourite and won by six lengths from Flush.

Turquoise did not run again until the opening day of the "First October" meeting at Newmarket, which actually took place on 29 September. She sustained her first defeat in a legitimate race as she finished third or fourth (officially unplaced) behind Lord George Cavendish's colt Amphion in the ten furlong Trial Stakes. Later that day she earned 70 guineas for her owner without having to compete when her opponent, a filly named Rosetta, was withdrawn from a scheduled match race. On the final day of the meeting she ran against moderate opposition in the Town Plate over the two mile Ditch-In course and won very easily. Turquoise won again on the opening day of the Second October meeting, as she beat Colonel Wilson's colt "in a canter" for a ten furlong subscription race. Later at the same meeting she carried 116 pounds in a handicap race and finished second, beaten three-quarters of a length by Gaberlunzie, a four-year-old colt carrying 119. The Sporting Magazine described the race as "a beautiful contest", whilst acknowledging that Turquoise had faced an almost impossible task at the weights.

=== 1829: four-year-old season ===
Turquoise began her four-year-old season with two unsuccessful runs at the First Spring meeting. She was beaten by Lord Sefton's mare Souvenir in a King's Plate over three and a half miles on 5 May and by Amphion in a race over the four-mile Beacon Course a day later.

In July, Turquoise raced away from Newmarket for the first time since her win in the Oaks when she was sent to contest a £50 Plate Ipswich. The race was run in a series of two-mile heats, with the prize going to the first horse to win twice. Turquoise settled the affair by winning the first two heats from Colonel Wilson's colt Little-go. Before the end of the month the Duke's filly claimed two more prizes without having to compete as she walked over in a £50 race at Newmarket and a King's Plate at Chelmsford. On 20 August Turquoise appeared in the Cup at Newport Pagnell but failed to reproduce her best form as she finished third in both heats of a race won by Coroner.

Turquoise returned to Newmarket in October for a subscription race over the Ditch-In course. She started 4/5 favourite and won from the Duke of Rutland's colt Oppidan. At the Houghton meeting at the end of the month Turquoise recorded her third walkover win of the season when no horse appeared to oppose her in a subscription race over the Beacon Course. Three days later she was beaten when attempting to concede five pounds to Oppidan in a handicap race.

=== 1830: five-year-old season ===
Turquoise's final season as a racehorse consisted of a single race at Newmarket's First Spring meeting. In a race over the Beacon Course she was beaten when attempting to concede twenty pounds to a colt named Glenfinlas.

== Stud record ==
Turquoise was retired from racing to become a broodmare at the Duke of Grafton's stud and remained there until her death in 1846. Her progeny included Jericho (sired by Jerry) who won the Criterion Stakes at Newmarket and finished second to The Flying Dutchman in the Ascot Gold Cup.

== Pedigree ==
Pedigree of Turquoise (GB), brown mare, 1825
Sire Selim (GB) 1802	Buzzard; 1787	Woodpecker	Herod
Sire Selim (GB) 1802	Buzzard; 1787	Woodpecker	Miss Ramsden
Sire Selim (GB) 1802	Buzzard; 1787	Misfortune	Dux
Sire Selim (GB) 1802	Buzzard; 1787	Misfortune	Curiosity
Sire Selim (GB) 1802	Alexander mare 1790	Alexander	Eclipse
Sire Selim (GB) 1802	Alexander mare 1790	Alexander	Grecian Princess
Sire Selim (GB) 1802	Alexander mare 1790	Highflyer mare	Highflyer
Sire Selim (GB) 1802	Alexander mare 1790	Highflyer mare	Alfred mare
Dam Pope Joan (GB) 1809	Waxy; 1790	Potoooooooo	Eclipse
Dam Pope Joan (GB) 1809	Waxy; 1790	Potoooooooo	Sportsmistress
Dam Pope Joan (GB) 1809	Waxy; 1790	Maria	Herod
Dam Pope Joan (GB) 1809	Waxy; 1790	Maria	Lisette
Dam Pope Joan (GB) 1809	Prunella; 1788	Highflyer	Herod
Dam Pope Joan (GB) 1809	Prunella; 1788	Highflyer	Rachel
Dam Pope Joan (GB) 1809	Prunella; 1788	Promise	Snap
Dam Pope Joan (GB) 1809	Prunella; 1788	Promise	Julia (Family 1-e)

- Turquoise was inbred 3 × 4 Highflyer, meaning that this stallion appears in both the third and fourth generations of her pedigree. She was also inbred 4 × 4 × 4 to Herod and 4 × 4 to Eclipse.
