= Champion (horse) =

British Thoroughbred racehorse

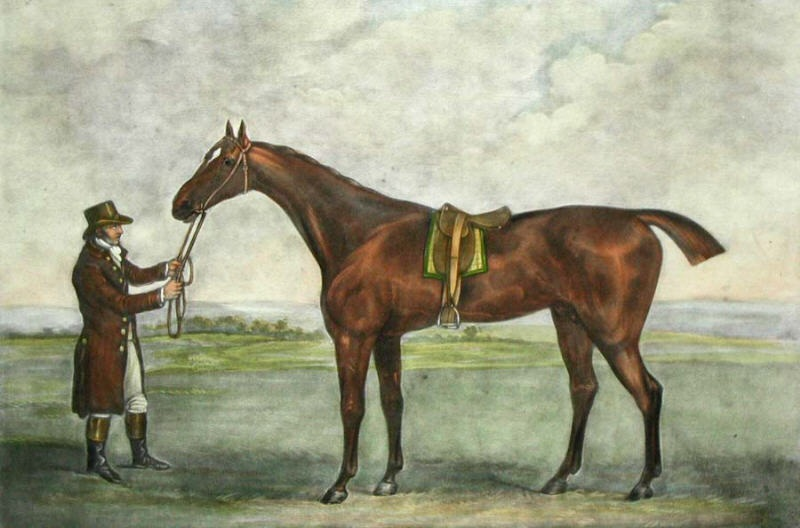
- Champion. Coloured engraving after a painting by John Nott Sartorius.
- Sire: Potoooooooo
- Grandsire: Eclipse
- Dam: Huncamunca
- Damsire: Highflyer
- Sex: Stallion
- Foaled: 1797
- Country: Kingdom of Great Britain
- Colour: Bay
- Breeder: Christopher Wilson
- Owner: Christopher Wilson
- Trainer: T. Perren
- Record: 9:6-0-2

Major wins
- Epsom Derby (1800); St Leger (1800)

Champion (1797 – after 1809) was a British Thoroughbred racehorse and sire. In a career that lasted from May 1800 to May 1802 he ran nine times and won five races. In the summer of 1800 he proved himself one of the best British colts of his generation, winning The Derby on his racecourse debut. Later that year he became the first Derby winner to win the St Leger, a feat which was not equalled until 1848. He was retired from racing after being injured on his only start as a five-year-old in 1802.

== Background ==
Champion was a bay horse bred at Oxton Hall near Tadcaster in North Yorkshire by his owner Christopher Wilson, a highly respected figure in the racing world who, in his later years, was known as "The Father of the Turf". He was the second of three Derby winners sired by the unusually named Potoooooooo, a highly successful racehorse who became an important and influential sire. Champion's dam, Huncamunca was the direct female ancestor of the Derby winner Mameluke as well as Charlotte (1000 Guineas) and Maid of Orleans (Oaks Stakes).

== Racing career ==
=== 1800: three-year-old season ===
Champion made his first appearance in the Derby at Epsom on 29 May. Despite his lack of previous experience he was made favourite at odds of 7/4 in a field of thirteen runners. Ridden by Bill Clift, he won "in a very high style" from Lord Egremont's unnamed colt by Precipitate out of Tag.

Champion returned to Yorkshire for his three remaining races of 1800. At York on 28 August he ran against three opponents in a Sweepstakes over one and a half miles. He started 4/5 favourite but finished third of the four runners behind Sir Harry Tempest-Vane's colt Rolla, with Lignum Vitae second. At the same course two days later he met Rolla again in a race over two miles and reversed the form at odds of 7/1. His mixed form did not deter Christopher Wilson, who, while staying at York's Black Swan Hotel, made so many bets on his colt for the St Leger that he ran out of paper on which to record them.

On 23 September at Doncaster Champion attempted to become the first winner of the Derby to capture the St Leger and thereby win the two most important races of the season for three-year-olds. Ridden on this occasion by Frank Buckle, he started the 2/1 favourite in a field of ten runners and won from Rolla. No other horse would complete the same double until Surplice, forty-eight years later.

At the end of the season, Wilson sold Champion to Lord Darlington.

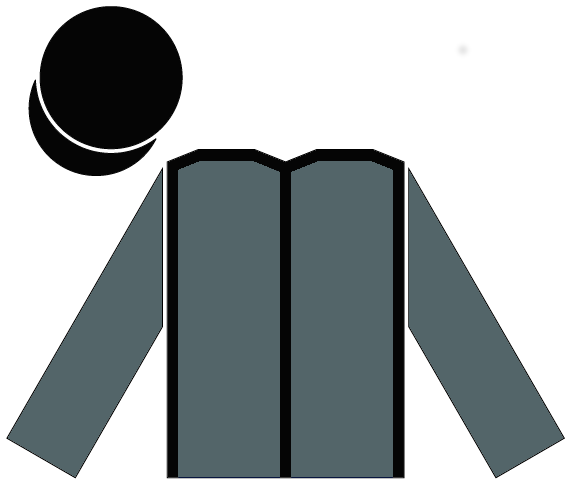
Racing Silks of Christopher Wilson

=== 1801: four-year-old season ===
In the spring of 1801, Champion raced for the first time at Newmarket, where he had four engagements. On 9 April he ran in a Sweepstakes and won the 200 guinea prize by beating his only opponent Triumvir, to whom he conceded seven pounds. On 20 April, Lord Darlington was able to claim forfeit when Mr Heathcote withdrew his horse Schedoni from a match against Champion. Two days later Champion carried top weight in a handicap Sweepstakes over ten furlongs "Across the Flat". He won the 300 guinea prize by beating Mr Cox's Cocoa-Tree, who was receiving twenty-seven pounds from the winner. On 4 May he received ten pounds from Mr Heatcote's horse Warter and won a 200 guinea match Across the Flat at odds of 1/4.

On 23 September, Champion returned to Doncaster for the Gold Cup over four miles. He started 5/2 second favourite and finished third of the four runners behind Chance and the favourite Sir Solomon.

At the end of the season, Champion was described by the Sporting Magazine as "a horse of uncommon speed and powers."

=== 1802: five-year-old season ===
Champion remained in training at five, but ran only once, in a match arranged the previous year. On 28 May he ran against Mr Fletcher's five-year-old horse Lethe over two miles at York. The fact that Lethe, who was receiving six pounds from Champion, started "high odds on" suggests that the Derby winner was not expected to win. In the event, the match was anticlimactic as Champion broke down with injury and failed to complete the course. He never raced again.

== Stud career ==
Champion was sold as a prospective stallion to Colonel Lumm who took the horse to Ireland. He had limited success as a sire of racehorses but did sire two good broodmares.

== Pedigree ==
Pedigree of Champion (GB), bay stallion, 1797
Sire Potoooooooo (GB) 1773	Eclipse; 1764	Marske	Squirt
Sire Potoooooooo (GB) 1773	Eclipse; 1764	Marske	The Ruby Mare
Sire Potoooooooo (GB) 1773	Eclipse; 1764	Spilletta	Regulus*
Sire Potoooooooo (GB) 1773	Eclipse; 1764	Spilletta	Mother Western
Sire Potoooooooo (GB) 1773	Sportmistress; 1765	Sportsman	Cade
Sire Potoooooooo (GB) 1773	Sportmistress; 1765	Sportsman	Silvertail
Sire Potoooooooo (GB) 1773	Sportmistress; 1765	Golden Locks	Oroonoko
Sire Potoooooooo (GB) 1773	Sportmistress; 1765	Golden Locks	Crab mare
Dam Huncamunca(GB) 1787	Highflyer; 1774	Herod	Tartar
Dam Huncamunca(GB) 1787	Highflyer; 1774	Herod	Cypron
Dam Huncamunca(GB) 1787	Highflyer; 1774	Rachel	Blank
Dam Huncamunca(GB) 1787	Highflyer; 1774	Rachel	Regulus mare* (1751)
Dam Huncamunca(GB) 1787	Cypher; 1772	Squirrel	Traveller
Dam Huncamunca(GB) 1787	Cypher; 1772	Squirrel	Grey Bloody Buttocks
Dam Huncamunca(GB) 1787	Cypher; 1772	Regulus mare (1749)	Regulus*
Dam Huncamunca(GB) 1787	Cypher; 1772	Regulus mare (1749)	Childers mare (Family:3-b)

* Champion is inbred 4S x 5D x 4D to the stallion Regulus, meaning that he appears fourth generation on the sire side of his pedigree, and fifth generation (via Regulus mare) and fourth generation on the dam side of his pedigree.
