= Filly by Selim =

British-bred Thoroughbred racehorse

- Sire: Selim
- Grandsire: Buzzard
- Dam: Cesario mare
- Damsire: Cesario
- Sex: Filly
- Foaled: 1812
- Country: United Kingdom
- Colour: Brown
- Breeder: Thomas Foley, 3rd Baron Foley
- Owner: Thomas Foley, 3rd Baron Foley
- Trainer: Richard Prince
- Record: 2:1-0-0
- Earnings: 700 gs

Major wins
- 1000 Guineas (1815)

The Filly by Selim (1812 – 26 May 1815) was an unnamed British Thoroughbred racehorse who won the second running of the classic 1000 Guineas at Newmarket Racecourse in 1815. The filly was killed after falling in the Oaks Stakes, her only other race.

== Background ==
The Selim Filly was brown in colour and was owned by the Whig politician Thomas Foley, 3rd Baron Foley. Her sire Selim won the Craven Stakes and the Oatlands Stakes at Newmarket and went on to have a successful stud career, siring the classic winners Azor (Epsom Derby), Medora (Oaks), Nicolo (2000 Guineas), Turcoman (2000 Guineas) and Turquoise (Oaks) as well as the British Champion sire Sultan. Selim was British champion sire in 1814. The Selim Filly's dam was an unnamed mare sired by Cesario out of Pea-hen, the sister of a good racemare named Plover who won a King's Plate at Newmarket 1810. Foley sent the filly into training at Newmarket with Richard Prince.

Until 1913 there was no requirement for British racehorses to have official names (two-year-olds were allowed to race unnamed until 1946). In the early 19th century it was common for racehorses to be known by their owners or pedigrees and the 1815 1000 Guineas winner was variously known as "the Selim filly", "the Plover filly", "the filly by Selim" or "Lord Foley's filly".

== Racing career ==
=== 1815: three-year-old season ===
The second running of the 1000 Guineas Stakes took place at Newmarket Racecourse on 27 April 1815. The race attracted an original entry of twelve, but only four fillies appeared to contest the race over the Ditch Mile. Making her racecourse debut the Selim Filly (described as "Ld. Foley's br. f. by Selim, dam by Cesario, out of a sister to Plover") started the 3/1 second favourite behind Minuet a filly owned by the Duke of Grafton who had won the July Stakes in 1814. The field was made up by Minuet's stable companion Discord and an unnamed bay filly owned by Mr Rush. Ridden by Bill Clift, the Selim Filly won from Minuet with Discord in third.

On 26 May the Selim Filly met Minuet again in the Oaks Stakes over one and a half miles at Epsom. The two were made joint-favourites at odds of 3/1 in a field of twelve. Just over a furlong from the finish the Selim Filly fell and dislocated a shoulder, the injury proving to be so serious that the filly was immediately euthanised. Clift sustained some bruising but was not badly injured.

== Pedigree ==
Pedigree of The Filly by Selim (GB), brown filly, 1812
Sire Selim (GB) 1802	Buzzard; 1787	Woodpecker	Herod
Sire Selim (GB) 1802	Buzzard; 1787	Woodpecker	Miss Ramsden
Sire Selim (GB) 1802	Buzzard; 1787	Misfortune	Dux
Sire Selim (GB) 1802	Buzzard; 1787	Misfortune	Curiosity
Sire Selim (GB) 1802	Alexander mare 1790	Alexander	Eclipse
Sire Selim (GB) 1802	Alexander mare 1790	Alexander	Grecian Princess
Sire Selim (GB) 1802	Alexander mare 1790	Highflyer mare	Highflyer
Sire Selim (GB) 1802	Alexander mare 1790	Highflyer mare	Alfred mare
Dam Cesario mare (GB) 1809	Cesario; 1800	John Bull	Fortitude
Dam Cesario mare (GB) 1809	Cesario; 1800	John Bull	Xantippe
Dam Cesario mare (GB) 1809	Cesario; 1800	Olivia	Justice
Dam Cesario mare (GB) 1809	Cesario; 1800	Olivia	Cypher
Dam Cesario mare (GB) 1809	Pea-hen; 1802	Sir Peter Teazle	Highflyer
Dam Cesario mare (GB) 1809	Pea-hen; 1802	Sir Peter Teazle	Papillon
Dam Cesario mare (GB) 1809	Pea-hen; 1802	Boudrow mare	Boudrow
Dam Cesario mare (GB) 1809	Pea-hen; 1802	Boudrow mare	Squirrel mare (Family 27)

- The stallion Highflyer appears twice in the fourth generation of the Selim Filly's pedigree. This made her less inbred than most Thoroughbreds of the period.
