= Tontine (horse) =

British Thoroughbred racehorse

- Sire: Election
- Grandsire: Gohanna
- Dam: Pope Joan
- Damsire: Waxy
- Sex: Mare
- Foaled: 1822
- Country: United Kingdom
- Colour: Chestnut
- Breeder: George FitzRoy, 4th Duke of Grafton
- Owner: Duke of Grafton
- Trainer: Robert Robson
- Record: 8:3-2-3

Major wins
- Wellington Stakes (1825); 1000 Guineas (1825)

Tontine (foaled 1822) was a British Thoroughbred racehorse and broodmare who won the classic 1000 Guineas at Newmarket in 1825. When the other horses entered in the race were withdrawn, Tontine became the only horse to win a classic by walkover. In a racing career which lasted from April 1825 until April 1826 she ran eight times and won three races. Unlike many of her near relatives, Tontine made no impact as a broodmare.

== Background ==
Tontine was a chestnut mare bred by her owner George FitzRoy, 4th Duke of Grafton at his stud at Euston Hall in Suffolk. She was sired by the Epsom Derby winner Election whose other classic winning offspring included colts Manfred (2000 Guineas) and Gustavus (Derby). Election died in the year of Tontine's conception of "inflammation", but his daughter's success enabled him to posthumously win the title of Champion sire in 1825. Tontine's dam Pope Joan was a daughter of Prunella, described as one of the most important broodmares in the history of the Thoroughbred breed. Pope Joan herself was a successful broodmare, producing several other good winners, all of whose names began with the letter "T", including Turquoise (Oaks Stakes), Turcoman (2000 Guineas), Trictrac, Tiara, Trance, Titian and Talisman. Grafton sent the filly to be trained at Newmarket by Robert Robson, the so-called "Emperor of Trainers".

== Racing career ==
=== 1825: three-year-old season ===
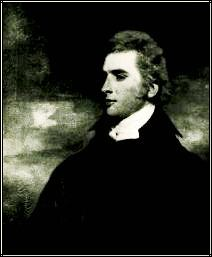
The Duke of Grafton, who bred and owned Tontine

Tontine made her first racecourse appearance on 6 April 1825 at the Newmarket Craven meeting. She started 4/6 favourite for a Sweepstakes over the Abington Mile course but was beaten by her only opponent, an unnamed colt owned by the Duke of York. Three days later, Tontine started 3/5 favourite for the Wellington Stakes over the same distance. Ridden by Frank Buckle, she won from two opponents to take a prize of 1,200 guineas. On 21 April, Tontine was scheduled to contest the twelfth running of the 1000 Guineas Stakes over the Rowley Mile course. Seven other fillies had been entered for the race by their owners, at a cost of £100 each, but none of them appeared to oppose Tontine on the day. The Duke's filly was therefore allowed to claim the prize by walking over the course. Although many early runnings of the 1000 Guineas and 2000 Guineas attracted very small fields this was the only occasion on which a British classic race was decided without a competitive heat. On 20 May at Epsom Downs Racecourse Tontine was made 4/6 favourite for the Oaks Stakes over one and a half miles. She finished third of the ten runners behind Wings, a filly owned by the Duke of Grafton's cousin Thomas Grosvenor.

Tontine did not appear again until the First October meeting where she was matched against the 2000 Guineas winner Enamel in the Post Sweepstakes over the Rowley Mile. Tontine led from the start and defeated Enamel, but both classic winners were beaten by the Duke of Portland's colt Mortgage, who got the better of a "severely contested" finish to prevail by a neck from the filly. At the Second October meeting two weeks later Tontine finished last of the four runners in a Subscription race behind Camel, Dahlia and Mortgage. Tontine's last appearance of the year came on 2 November at the Houghton meeting. In a Handicap Plate over ten furlongs she carried a weight of 112 pounds and ran a dead heat with Mr Hunter's unnamed grey filly, with Dahlia in third place. Mr Hunter declined to run his filly in a deciding heat, leaving Tontine to walk over for the victory, although the owners did agree to divide the prize.

=== 1826: four-year-old season ===
Tontine was kept in training as a four-year-old in 1826, but her campaign consisted of a single unsuccessful start. On 26 April at the First Spring meeting she was one of three runners for a subscription race over the four mile Beacon Course. The filly lost her chance by bolting and finished last behind Chateaux Margaux and Nigel. She did not run again.

== Stud record ==
Tontine was retired from racing to become a broodmare at the Duke of Grafton's stud. She produced several foals by stallions including Merlin, Sultan and St Patrick, but no top class runners.

== Pedigree ==
Pedigree of Tontine (GB), chestnut mare, 1822
Sire Election (GB) 1804	Gohanna; 1790	Mercury	Eclipse
Sire Election (GB) 1804	Gohanna; 1790	Mercury	Tartar Mare
Sire Election (GB) 1804	Gohanna; 1790	Dundas Herod mare	Herod
Sire Election (GB) 1804	Gohanna; 1790	Dundas Herod mare	Maiden
Sire Election (GB) 1804	Chestnut Skim; 1794	Woodpecker	Herod
Sire Election (GB) 1804	Chestnut Skim; 1794	Woodpecker	Miss Ramsden
Sire Election (GB) 1804	Chestnut Skim; 1794	Milsintowns Herod mare	Herod
Sire Election (GB) 1804	Chestnut Skim; 1794	Milsintowns Herod mare	Young Hag
Dam Pope Joan (GB) 1809	Waxy; 1790	Potoooooooo	Eclipse
Dam Pope Joan (GB) 1809	Waxy; 1790	Potoooooooo	Sportsmistress
Dam Pope Joan (GB) 1809	Waxy; 1790	Maria	Herod
Dam Pope Joan (GB) 1809	Waxy; 1790	Maria	Lisette
Dam Pope Joan (GB) 1809	Prunella; 1788	Highflyer	Herod
Dam Pope Joan (GB) 1809	Prunella; 1788	Highflyer	Rachel
Dam Pope Joan (GB) 1809	Prunella; 1788	Promise	Snap
Dam Pope Joan (GB) 1809	Prunella; 1788	Promise	Julia (Family 1-e)

- Tontine was inbred to an unusual degree. The stallion Herod appears five times in the fourth generation of her pedigree while Eclipse appears twice. This means that she had only three of a possible eight great-great-grandsires.
