= Pelisse (horse) =

British-bred Thoroughbred racehorse

- Sire: Whiskey
- Grandsire: Saltram
- Dam: Prunella
- Damsire: Highflyer
- Sex: Mare
- Foaled: 1801
- Country: United Kingdom of Great Britain and Ireland
- Colour: Brown
- Breeder: Augustus FitzRoy, 3rd Duke of Grafton
- Owner: Duke of Grafton; General Gower; Richard Watt; Mr Fermor; Mr Forth; Lord Lowther
- Trainer: Robert Robson
- Record: 35:13-11-4

Major wins
- Oaks Stakes (1804); Match against Harefoot (1804); Match against Bustard (1805); October Oatlands Stakes (1806); Match against Witchcraft (1806); Subscription Handicap Plate (1806); Egham Town Plate (1807); Match against Morel (1809); Match against Miltonia (1809)

Pelisse (1801–1810) was a British Thoroughbred racehorse who won the classic Oaks Stakes at Epsom Downs Racecourse in 1804. In a long racing career which lasted from April 1804 until April 1809 she had at least six different owners and ran thirty-five times, winning thirteen races and finishing second on eleven occasions. The Oaks was her second race and first win. In the succeeding years she competed at distances from five furlongs to four miles, racing mainly at Newmarket Racecourse, often in match races. She died in 1810, a year after being retired from racing.

== Background ==
Pelisse was a brown mare bred by Augustus FitzRoy, 3rd Duke of Grafton at his stud at Euston Hall in Suffolk. Her sire Whiskey was a successful racehorse before breaking down in a race at Lewes. At stud he sired 148 winners including The Derby winner Eleanor and the dams of the Derby winners Phantom and Priam. Pelisse's dam Prunella has been described as "one of the most significant mares in the history of the breed", producing the Derby winner Pope and the broodmares Penelope, Parasol, Pawn, Prudence and Pope Joan, all of whom produced classic winners. Grafton sent the filly to be trained at Newmarket by Robert Robson, the so-called "Emperor of Trainers".

== Racing career ==
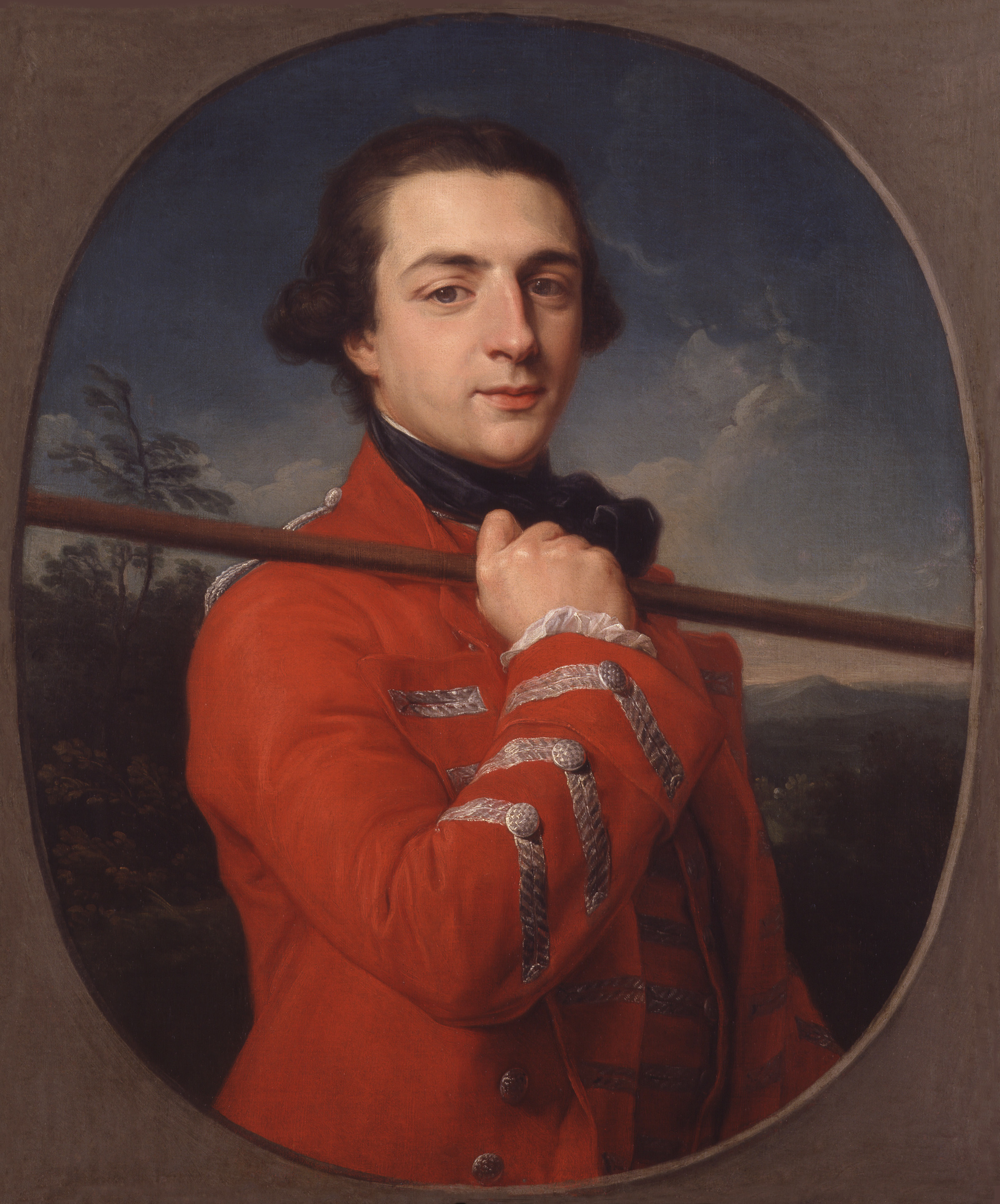
The Duke of Grafton, who bred and owned Pelisse

=== 1804: three-year-old season ===
Pelisse was scheduled to make her debut on 3 April in a match race at the Newmarket Craven meeting, but was able to claim the prize without racing when her opponent, a colt owned by Sir Charles Bunbury, 6th Baronet was withdrawn. Two weeks later, she started the 4/6 favourite for the Newmarket Stakes but finished second to a colt named Prospero. Pelisse's next race was the Oaks Stakes for three-year-old fillies over one and a half miles at Epsom on 18 May. Ridden by Bill Clift, she started 4/5 favourite in a field of eight and won from Lord Egremont's unnamed filly by Precipitate. On 10 July Pelisse ran against colts again and finished fourth in the Newmarket Town Plate.

The filly was then rested until the autumn meetings at Newmarket where she was unbeaten in her four engagements. On 1 October she won a match at level weights against the colt Harefoot over one and a half miles. Two weeks later on the opening day of the Second October meeting she won a Sweepstakes over the Rowley Mile course. Two days later she claimed a 200 guinea match against Lord Egremont's Precipitate filly when the Oaks runner-up failed to appear for the race. On the following day Pelisse ended her season with a victory when she successfully conceded weight to the colts Brainworm and Watery in a ten furlong Sweepstakes.

=== 1805: four-year-old season ===
In April 1805 Pelisse began her second season by winning a 100 guinea match against Mr Ladbroke's colt Bustard over ten furlongs at Newmarket. This proved to be her only success of the year. At the next Newmarket meeting she finished fourth to Pavilion in the New Claret Stakes and was then off the course until autumn. At the First October meeting, which actually began on 29 September, Pelisse was beaten by Lord Foley's colt Hippocampus in a 200 guinea match on the opening day and then finished third of the five runners behind Lady Brough in a two-mile Subscription race. Two weeks later at the Second October meeting she was beaten in a ten furlong match race in which failed to concede sixteen pounds to a three-year-old colt named Newmarket.

=== 1806: five-year-old season ===
At the 1806 Craven meeting Pelisse was beaten in a two-mile match at Newmarket by Little Peter, to whom she was conceding ten pounds. Two weeks later she sustained her sixth consecutive defeat when she lost a match against a three-year-old filly named Pipylina, but then won her next five races. On 6 May at Newmarket, running in the ownership of General Gower she beat Charles Bunbury's filly Lydia in a five furlong Sweepstakes and then successfully conceded 27 pounds to a three-year-old colt in a match over the same course and distance.

On 16 October Pelisse started the 2/1 favourite for the October Oatlands Stakes over the Ditch Mile and won from Lord Grosvenor's filly Violante. Fifteen days later she beat Lord Sackville's Witchcraft in a 100 guinea match over two miles. Later that afternoon she appeared in a two-mile handicap race in which her eight opponents included Parasol (her sister), Bustard and the St Leger winner Staveley. Pelisse, carrying a weight of 114 pounds, and won at odds of 6/1 from Sir Frank Standish's sister to Duxbury.

=== 1807: six-year-old season ===
The mare changed hands more than once in 1807. She began the year in the ownership of Richard Watt, then appeared in the colours of Mr Fermor, and then Mr Forth before returning to Mr Fermor. Pelisse began her fourth season by finishing second to the leading stayer Orville over the four mile Beacon Course on 30 April. At Lewes in August the mare raced away from Newmarket for the first time in three years when she was beaten in a four-mile match against Orville. Later that month she finished third to Canopus and Master Jackey in the Gold Cup at Egham. On the following day she recorded her only competitive success of the season when she won both heats of the Egham Town Plate. Pelisse returned to Newmarket in October where she finished fourth to Canopus in the October Oatlands Stakes and then collected a 50 guinea forfeit when Lord Sackville's horse Enchanter failed to appear for a scheduled match.

=== 1808: seven-year-old season ===
Pelisse failed to win in five competitive starts in 1808, a year in which she twice changed ownership. On the opening day of racing at Newmarket she finished unplaced in the Craven Stakes and in May she was back in Gower's colours when she finished second to Nymphina in the Jockey Club Plate. After a break of more than five months Pelisse returned at the Houghton meeting on 31 October. She finished third to Juniper (later a successful stallion) in a two-mile Sweepstakes, and then collected a 50 guinea forfeit when Mr Shakespear's Zodiac failed to appear for a five furlong match. The conditions for this event were most unusual in the Pelisse and Zodiac had been scheduled to carry 16 stones and 18 stones respectively. Later in the week she was beaten in a match against the Duke of Grafton's Vandyke and finished unplaced in a handicap. In these last two races she was owned by Lord Lowther.

=== 1809: eight-year-old season ===
Pelisse began her final season with two engagements at Newmarket on 6 April. She was beaten when attempting to concede 28 pounds to Lord Grosvenor's filly May in a match for "Gentlemen riders" and then won 50 guineas when her opponent, Ferdinand, failed to appear for a ten furlong match later that afternoon. Twelve days later she won two more matches, beating the 1808 Oaks winner Morel over two miles and the Duke of Grafton's filly Miltonia over five furlongs. At the Second Spring meeting on 1 May she finished third to Grimaldi over four miles finishing one place ahead of the 1805 Oaks winner Meteora. A rare trip away from Newmarket in June saw the mare finish fourth in the Gold Cup over four miles at Stamford. Pelisse ended her racing career with two unsuccessful runs at the Newmarket July meeting. She was beaten by Juniper in a two-mile match and then finished last of the five runners in the July Oatlands Stakes two days later.

== Stud record ==
Pelisse was retired from racing to become a broodmare. Unlike many of her near relatives who had great success as broodmares she had no chance to prove herself at stud, dying in 1810 before producing a foal.

== Pedigree ==
Pedigree of Pelisse (GB), bay mare 1801
Sire Whiskey (GB) 1789	Saltram; 1780	Eclipse	Marske
Sire Whiskey (GB) 1789	Saltram; 1780	Eclipse	Spilletta
Sire Whiskey (GB) 1789	Saltram; 1780	Virago	Snap
Sire Whiskey (GB) 1789	Saltram; 1780	Virago	Regulus Mare
Sire Whiskey (GB) 1789	Calash; 1775	Herod	Tartar
Sire Whiskey (GB) 1789	Calash; 1775	Herod	Cypron
Sire Whiskey (GB) 1789	Calash; 1775	Teresa	Matchem
Sire Whiskey (GB) 1789	Calash; 1775	Teresa	Brown Regulus
Dam Prunella 1788	Highflyer; 1774	Herod	Tartar
Dam Prunella 1788	Highflyer; 1774	Herod	Cypron
Dam Prunella 1788	Highflyer; 1774	Rachel	Blank
Dam Prunella 1788	Highflyer; 1774	Rachel	Regulus mare
Dam Prunella 1788	Promise; 1768	Snap	Snip
Dam Prunella 1788	Promise; 1768	Snap	sister to Slipby
Dam Prunella 1788	Promise; 1768	Julia	Blank
Dam Prunella 1788	Promise; 1768	Julia	Partner mare
