= Charlotte (horse) =

British-bred Thoroughbred racehorse

- Sire: Orville
- Grandsire: Beningbrough
- Dam: Sophia
- Damsire: Buzzard
- Sex: Mare
- Foaled: 1811
- Country: United Kingdom
- Colour: Bay
- Breeder: Christopher Wilson
- Owner: Christopher Wilson
- Trainer: Thomas Perren
- Record: 5:2-3-0
- Earnings: £1,155

Major wins
- 1000 Guineas (1814); Stamford Gold Cup (1815)

Charlotte (1811 – after 1828) was a British Thoroughbred racehorse and broodmare who won the inaugural running of the classic 1000 Guineas at Newmarket Racecourse in 1814. The Guineas was Charlotte's only race as a three-year-old but she returned to run four times in 1814. She won a Gold Cup at Stamford but was retired after being injured in a race at the same course a day later.

== Background ==
Charlotte was a bay mare bred by her owner Christopher Wilson of Tadcaster. She sired by Orville, a successful staying racehorse who excelled over extreme distances. At stud he was Champion sire in 1817 and 1822 and sired the Classic winners Octavius (Derby), Emilius (Derby), Zoe (1000 Guineas) and Ebor (St Leger). Charlotte's dam Sophia was a half-sister of Champion, a colt who won both the Derby and St Leger for Wilson in 1800. At stud, Sophia also produced Miss Sophia, who in turn produced the Derby winner Mameluke.

== Racing career ==
=== 1814: three-year-old season ===
In the spring of 1814 a new race for three-year-old fillies was instituted at Newmarket racecourse. The race was named The 1,000gs Stakes, either in imitation of the 2000 Guineas, a race for both colts and fillies instituted in 1809, or because the race attracted ten entries at 100 guineas each. Five fillies appeared to contest the race over the Ditch Mile on 28 April with the previously unraced Charlotte being made favourite at odds of 11/5. She won the race beating the Duke of Grafton's filly Vestal, with the Duke of Rutland's Medora in third. A month later, Medora won the Oaks Stakes at Epsom. The 1000 Guineas was Charlotte's only recorded race in 1814.

=== 1815: four-year-old season ===
Almost a year after her last run, Charlotte reappeared at the Newmarket First Spring meeting in April 1815. She started the outsider of three runners in the two-mile Claret Stakes for four-year-olds and finished second to Lord George Cavendish's colt Bourbon. At the Second Spring meeting two weeks later Charlotte ran a ten furlong match race against Mr Villiers' five-year-old Don Cossac. Charlotte was beaten by her older rival, despite carrying eighteen pounds less weight.

In July, Charlotte was campaigned away from Newmarket for the first time as she contested two races at Stamford in Lincolnshire. On 5 July she won the Stamford Gold Cup over four miles, beating Colonel King's colt Kingston and three others for a prize of 100 guineas. On the following day Charlotte ran in a Sweepstakes in which she finished second of the three runners. The filly broke down injured in the race and did not race again.

== Stud record ==
Charlotte was retired from racing to become a broodmare at Ledston Hall Farm near Ferrybridge in Yorkshire and was covered in her first season at stud by Smolensko but did not produce a foal. She produced six colts and two fillies from 1818 to 1828. Her last recorded foal was delivered in 1828 and she was designated as "dead" in the third volume of the General Stud Book.

== Pedigree ==
Pedigree of Charlotte (GB), bay mare, 1811
Sire Orville (GB) 1799	Beningbrough; 1791	King Fergus	Eclipse
Sire Orville (GB) 1799	Beningbrough; 1791	King Fergus	Creeping Polly
Sire Orville (GB) 1799	Beningbrough; 1791	Fenwick's Herod mare	Herod*
Sire Orville (GB) 1799	Beningbrough; 1791	Fenwick's Herod mare	Pyrrha
Sire Orville (GB) 1799	Evelina; 1791	Highflyer	Herod*
Sire Orville (GB) 1799	Evelina; 1791	Highflyer	Rachel
Sire Orville (GB) 1799	Evelina; 1791	Termagant	Tantrum
Sire Orville (GB) 1799	Evelina; 1791	Termagant	Cantatrice
Dam Sophia (GB) 1798	Buzzard; 1787	Woodpecker	Herod
Dam Sophia (GB) 1798	Buzzard; 1787	Woodpecker	Miss Ramsden
Dam Sophia (GB) 1798	Buzzard; 1787	Misfortune	Dux
Dam Sophia (GB) 1798	Buzzard; 1787	Misfortune	Curiosity
Dam Sophia (GB) 1798	Huncamunca; 1787	Highflyer	Herod
Dam Sophia (GB) 1798	Huncamunca; 1787	Highflyer	Rachel
Dam Sophia (GB) 1798	Huncamunca; 1787	Cypher	Squirrel
Dam Sophia (GB) 1798	Huncamunca; 1787	Cypher	Regulus mare (Family:3-b)
