= Selim (horse) =

British-bred Thoroughbred racehorse

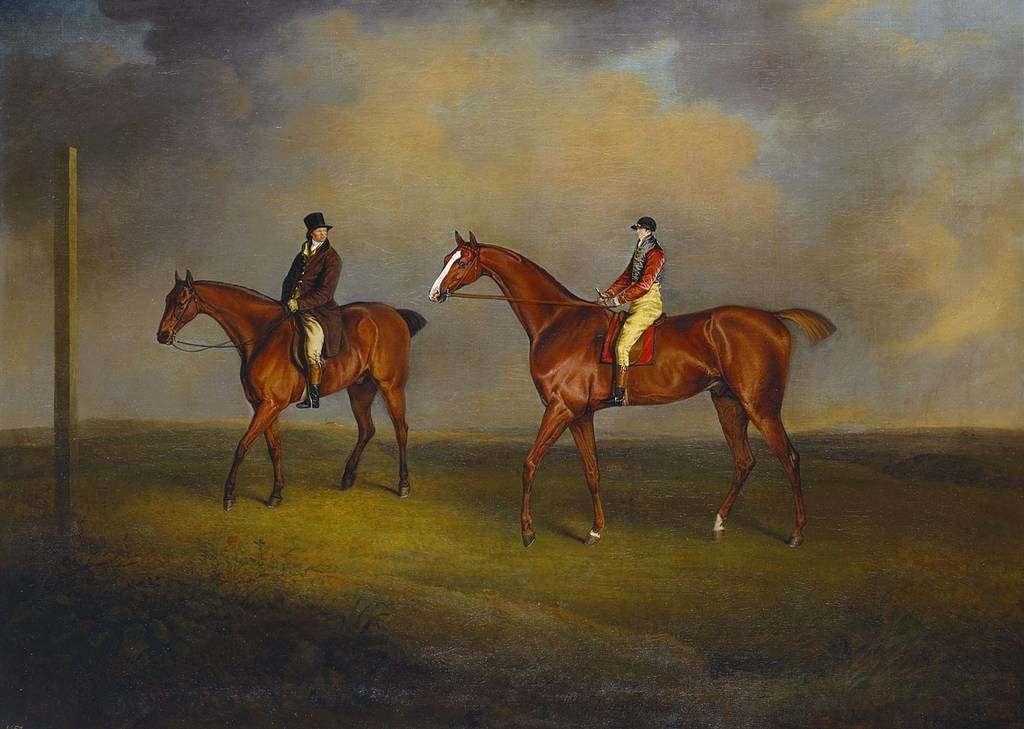
- Selim with William Edwards and Mr Perren, by Henry Bernard Chalon
- Sire: Buzzard
- Grandsire: Woodpecker
- Dam: Alexander mare
- Damsire: Alexander
- Sex: Stallion
- Foaled: 1802
- Country: Great Britain
- Colour: Chestnut
- Breeder: General Sparrow
- Owner: Prince of Wales; D. Radcliffe; Arthur Shakespear
- Record: 8: 5-3-0

Major wins
- First class October Oatlands Stakes (1806); Craven Stakes (1807); Third class October Oatlands Stakes (1807); Match against Lydia (1808)

Awards
- Leading sire in Great Britain and Ireland (1814)

Selim (1802–1825) was a British Thoroughbred racehorse. He was owned by the Prince of Wales, D. Radcliffe and later Arthur Shakespear. After retiring from racing he became a successful stallion and was British Champion sire in 1814. His progeny included Azor, Medora, Sultan and Turquoise.

== Background ==
Selim was a chestnut colt bred by General Sparrow and foaled in 1802. He was sired by Buzzard, who won the Craven Stakes twice and the Jockey Club Plate. Selim's dam was the bay Alexander mare, a daughter of Alexander. She also produced Castrel, Rubens and Bronze (all of whom for full-siblings to Selim.

== Racing career ==
=== 1806: Four-year-old season ===
Selim did not race until he was four years old. He made his debut on 29 July 1806 at Brighthelmston, where he beat the colt Wormwood over a mile for 50 guineas. His only other race of the season was in the first class October Oatlands Stakes over a mile at Newmarket. Now the property of D. Radcliffe, he started the 7/4 favourite in the field of five and won the race from Captain Absolute, with second-favourite Lydia finishing in third place.

=== 1807: Five-year-old season ===
Selim returned to the track as a five-year-old in the Craven Stakes at Newmarket on 30 March 1807, when he started favourite of the eleven-strong field. Selim won the race from Walton and Currycomb, who finished in second and third respectively. Two days later he finished second to Lydia in the £50 Subscription Place. He then won the third class October Oatlands Stakes at Newmarket from Gaiety, after starting the odds-on favourite of the five runners.

=== 1808: Six-year-old season ===
Selim beat Lydia for 200 guineas in April 1808 at the Newmarket Craven meeting. He was then acquired by Arthur Shakespear and was beaten by Tim in a match race at Newmarket. Tim was apparently carrying much less weight than Selim. He lost another match race in October, this time to Earl Grosvenor's Violante. This was Selim's last race and he was then retired to stud.

== Stud career ==
In his first season at stud Selim stood at Six Mile Bottom near Newmarket for a fee of ten guineas and half a guinea for the groom. The following year he moved to Newmarket itself and his fee doubled to twenty guineas and one guinea to the groom. He went on to become a successful stallion and was British Champion sire in 1814. His progeny included Epsom Derby winner Azor, Epsom Oaks winners Medora and Turquoise, 2000 Guineas winners Nicolo and Turcoman and an unnamed filly that won the 1000 Guineas. Selim also sired six-time Champion sire Sultan. He died in 1825.

== Sire line tree ==
- Selim
  - Champion
  - Fandango
  - Azor
  - Sultan
    - Augustus
    - Mahmoud
    - Hoemus
    - Beiram
      - Phlegon
        - Leopold
        - Phaeton
    - Alpheus
      - Evenus
    - Despot
      - Hooton
        - Brill
    - Divan
    - Ishmael
      - Ilderim
      - Ishmaelite
        - Herold
      - Dr Jenner
        - Vaccination
      - Hambledon
      - The Star of Erin
      - Abd El Kader
      - Burgundy
        - Old Malt
        - Shanbally
    - Glencoe
      - Thornhill
      - Winnebago
      - Glencoe (Howard)
      - Union
      - Highlander
        - Everlasting
      - Star Davis
        - Jerome Edger
        - Metaire
        - Day Star
      - Darby
      - Vandal
        - Jack the Barber
        - Revill
        - Volscian
        - Therit
        - Virgil
        - Pompey Payne
        - Versailles
        - Survivor
        - Council Bluffs
        - Vagabond
        - Vicksburg
        - Voltigeur
      - Frankfort
      - Little Arthur
      - Pryor
      - Bay Dick
        - Bay Wood
      - Bonnie Laddie
      - Foreigner
      - Nicholas I
      - France
        - King Bird
      - Glencoe Jr
      - Walnut
      - O'Meara
      - Trumpeter
        - Young Trumpeter
      - Glencoe (Hunter)
      - Panic
    - Aurelius
    - Caliph
    - Ibrahim
    - Bay Middleton
      - Aristides
      - Bramble
      - Farintosh
      - Gaper
      - Baveno
      - Bay Momus
      - Pastoral
        - Collingwood
      - The-Devil-To-Pay
      - Best Bower
      - Cowl
        - The Confessor
        - The Friar
        - The Grand Inquisitor
      - Joy
      - Gabbler
      - Planet
        - Aster
      - Honeycomb
      - The Flying Dutchman
        - Ellington
        - Fly-By-Night
        - Peter Wilkens
        - Flying Pieman
        - Ignoramus
        - Purston
        - Amsterdam
        - Duneany
        - Glenbuck
        - The Rover
        - Cape Flyaway
        - Tom Bowline
        - Winton
        - Young Dutchman
        - Ellerton
        - Romulus
        - Walloon
        - Dollar
        - Tourmalet
        - Dutch Skater
        - Massinissa
        - Jarnac
      - Osterley
      - Hesperus
        - Sir Birtram
        - Diomedes
      - St Aubyn
      - Barbatus
      - Vanderdecken
      - Andover
        - Craymond
        - Walkington
      - The Hermit
        - Freetrader
      - Autocrat
      - Bessus
      - Milton
      - Anton
    - Hampton
      - Leaconfield
    - Achmet
    - Adrian
    - Dardanelles
    - Hibiscus
    - Jereed
      - Great Heart
      - Nat
      - The Bishop of Romford's Cob
      - The Free Lance
    - Sultan Jr
    - Wisdom
    - Caesar
    - Clarion
    - Kremlin
    - Scutari
  - Feramorz
    - De Vere
  - Langar
    - Felt
      - Godolphin
    - Fang
    - Philip the First
      - King Dan
    - Ratcatcher
    - Stockport
      - Skipton
      - Cotton Lord
      - Post Tempore
    - The Potentate
    - Elis
    - Jordan
      - Kentuckian
    - Master Wags
      - La Cloture
      - Nat
    - Epirus
      - Pyrrhus The First
        - King Alfred
        - New Warrior
        - Magus
        - Snowden
        - Mouravieff
        - Ringer
      - Pitsford
        - Ramornie
      - Ephesus
        - Emilius
      - Grecian
      - Warhawk
        - Buzzard
        - Flying Buck
        - Camden
      - Little Harry
      - Epaminondas
    - Lord Stafford
    - Epidaurus
    - Montreal
    - Langar
    - Flagsman
    - Galanthus
  - Marcellus
  - Nicolo
  - Saracen
  - The Moslem
  - Turcoman
    - Roscius

== Pedigree ==
Pedigree of Selim, chestnut stallion, 1802
| Sire Buzzard (GB) 1787 | Woodpecker (GB); 1773 | Herod*; 1758 | Tartar |
| Sire Buzzard (GB) 1787 | Woodpecker (GB); 1773 | Herod*; 1758 | Cypron |
| Sire Buzzard (GB) 1787 | Woodpecker (GB); 1773 | Miss Ramsden | Cade |
| Sire Buzzard (GB) 1787 | Woodpecker (GB); 1773 | Miss Ramsden | Sister to Fair Star |
| Sire Buzzard (GB) 1787 | Misfortune (GB); 1775 | Dux; 1769 | Matchem |
| Sire Buzzard (GB) 1787 | Misfortune (GB); 1775 | Dux; 1769 | Duchess |
| Sire Buzzard (GB) 1787 | Misfortune (GB); 1775 | Curiosity; 1760 | Snap |
| Sire Buzzard (GB) 1787 | Misfortune (GB); 1775 | Curiosity; 1760 | Sister to Miss Belsea |
| Dam Alexander mare (GB) | Alexander (GB); 1782 | Eclipse; 1764 | Marske |
| Dam Alexander mare (GB) | Alexander (GB); 1782 | Eclipse; 1764 | Spilletta |
| Dam Alexander mare (GB) | Alexander (GB); 1782 | Grecian Princess; 1770 | Williams's Forester |
| Dam Alexander mare (GB) | Alexander (GB); 1782 | Grecian Princess; 1770 | Coalition colt mare |
| Dam Alexander mare (GB) | Highflyer mare (GB); 1780 | Highflyer; 1774 | Herod* |
| Dam Alexander mare (GB) | Highflyer mare (GB); 1780 | Highflyer; 1774 | Rachel |
| Dam Alexander mare (GB) | Highflyer mare (GB); 1780 | Alfred mare 1775 | Alfred |
| Dam Alexander mare (GB) | Highflyer mare (GB); 1780 | Alfred mare 1775 | Engineer mare |

* Selim is inbred 3S x 4D to the stallion Herod, meaning that he appears third generation on the sire side of his pedigree and fourth generation on the dam side of his pedigree.
