= The Flea (horse) =

British Thoroughbred racehorse

- Sire: Coronation
- Grandsire: Sir Hercules
- Dam: Puce
- Damsire: Rowton
- Sex: Mare
- Foaled: 1846
- Country: United Kingdom
- Colour: Bay
- Breeder: Lord George Bentinck
- Owner: 1) Frank Clarke; 2) Queen Victoria; 3) King of Sardinia
- Trainer: John Barham Day
- Record: 4: 1-0-0
- Earnings: £2050 (1000 Guineas)

Major wins
- 1000 Guineas (1849)

The Flea, or alternatively Flea, (1846 – 1856) was a British Thoroughbred racehorse notable for winning the 1000 Guineas Stakes in 1849.

== Background ==
The Flea was bred by Lord George Bentinck at his Goodwood House stud in Westhampnett. Her sire, Coronation had won the 1841 Derby and Ascot Derby. Coronation stood only a few seasons in the United Kingdom before being exported to Russia. Her dam, Puce (1834 – 1849), was bred by the Duke of Cleveland and was sired by the 1829 St. Leger winner, Rowton. The Flea's half-sister Monstrosity produced the 1844 2000 Guineas winner The Ugly Buck. Puce's dam, Pucelle, was a daughter of the 1814 Oaks winner Medora and is a tail-female ancestor to St. Marguerite (Thoroughbred family 4-n). Puce's full sister Virginia produced the multiple stakes winner Virago and is an ancestor of the 1000 Guineas and Oaks winner Thebais.

The majority of the Bentinck Stud, including Puce, was sold in August 1846 to Lord Mostyn. The Flea was acquired by Frank Clarke (c. 1800 – 1856), who wrote for the racing publication Bell's Life under the pseudonym Pegasus. The Flea was trained by John Day at Danebury.

== Racing career ==
The Flea was not raced extensively and only completed as a three-year-old. Ridden by Alfred Day, the son of her trainer, The Flea won the 1000 Guineas by a head from the mares Clarissa and St. Rosalia in a field of 10 runners. The Oaks winner, Lady Evelyn, did run but was not placed in the race. The race was later called "unwisely run and unwisely ridden" by the racing press, but Alfred Day's performance was praised. The Flea's only win was in the 1000 Guineas. She was unplaced for the Ascot Gold Vase in June, the Chesterfield Stakes in July, and the Orange Stakes run at Goodwood in August. She was subsequently retired to become a broodmare at the close of the 1849 racing season.

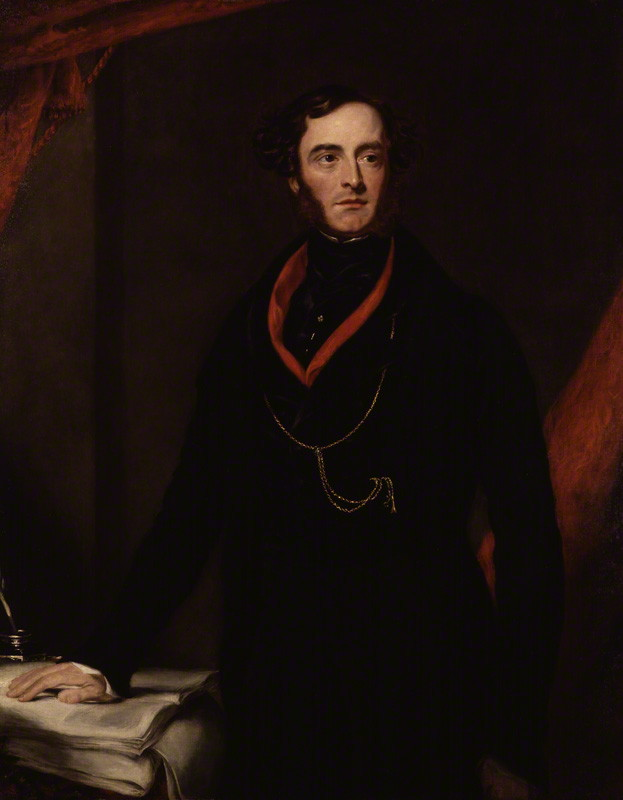
The Flea was bred by Lord George Bentinck.

== Breeding career ==
First retired to Lord Exeter's stud in 1850, The Flea was bought by representatives for Queen Victoria and moved to Hampton Court Stud by 1852. The Flea was not a successful broodmare, with her best runner being Cimicina. She produced four foals before her death:

- Chestnut filly (foaled in 1851), sired by The Hero. This foal was sold to Count Waldstein in 1852.
- Cimicina (1852 – 1858), sired by Phlegon. Winner of seven races as a two-year-old. Described as "small and undersized", she produced only one foal that died young.
- Canary (foaled in 1854), sired by Alarm. Unsuccessful as racehorse.
- The Flea (foaled in 1855), filly sired by Orlando. This foal was exported to Turin in 1856 and died in 1864.

The Flea was bred to Pyrrhus The First in 1855 and was presented as a gift to the King of Sardinia in January 1856. She died in the spring of 1856 before foaling and before she could be exported to Sardinia.

== Pedigree ==
Pedigree of The Flea (GB), bay mare, 1846
Sire Coronation (GB) Bay, 1838	Sir Hercules; 1826	Whalebone	Waxy
Sire Coronation (GB) Bay, 1838	Sir Hercules; 1826	Whalebone	Penelope
Sire Coronation (GB) Bay, 1838	Sir Hercules; 1826	Peri	Wanderer
Sire Coronation (GB) Bay, 1838	Sir Hercules; 1826	Peri	Thalestris
Sire Coronation (GB) Bay, 1838	Ruby; 1825	Rubens	Buzzard
Sire Coronation (GB) Bay, 1838	Ruby; 1825	Rubens	Alexander mare
Sire Coronation (GB) Bay, 1838	Ruby; 1825	Williamson's Ditto mare	Williamson's Ditto
Sire Coronation (GB) Bay, 1838	Ruby; 1825	Williamson's Ditto mare	Agnes
Dam Puce (GB) Chestnut, 1834	Rowton; 1826	Oiseau	Camillus
Dam Puce (GB) Chestnut, 1834	Rowton; 1826	Oiseau	Ruler mare
Dam Puce (GB) Chestnut, 1834	Rowton; 1826	Katherina	Woful
Dam Puce (GB) Chestnut, 1834	Rowton; 1826	Katherina	Landscape
Dam Puce (GB) Chestnut, 1834	Pucelle; 1821	Muley	Orville
Dam Puce (GB) Chestnut, 1834	Pucelle; 1821	Muley	Eleanor
Dam Puce (GB) Chestnut, 1834	Pucelle; 1821	Medora	Selim
Dam Puce (GB) Chestnut, 1834	Pucelle; 1821	Medora	Sir Harry mare (Family 4)
