= 1822 in sports =

1822 in sports describes the year's events in world sport.

== Boxing ==
Events

- 18 May — Tom Cribb announces his retirement and relinquishes his English Championship title. He nominates his protégé Tom Spring as his successor. Spring offers to fight anyone in England but there are no immediate volunteers.

== Cricket ==
Events

- The roundarm controversy comes to a head when, in the MCC v Kent match at Lord's, John Willes of Kent opens the bowling and is no-balled for using a roundarm action, a style he has attempted to introduce since 1807. Willes promptly withdraws from the match and refuses to play again in any important fixture.

England

- Most runs – E. H. Budd 354 (HS 87)
- Most wickets – John Sparks 27 (BB 5–?)

== Horse racing ==
England

- 1,000 Guineas Stakes – Whizgig
- 2,000 Guineas Stakes – Pastille
- The Derby – Moses
- The Oaks – Pastille
- St. Leger Stakes – Theodore
