= Camarine =

British-bred Thoroughbred racehorse

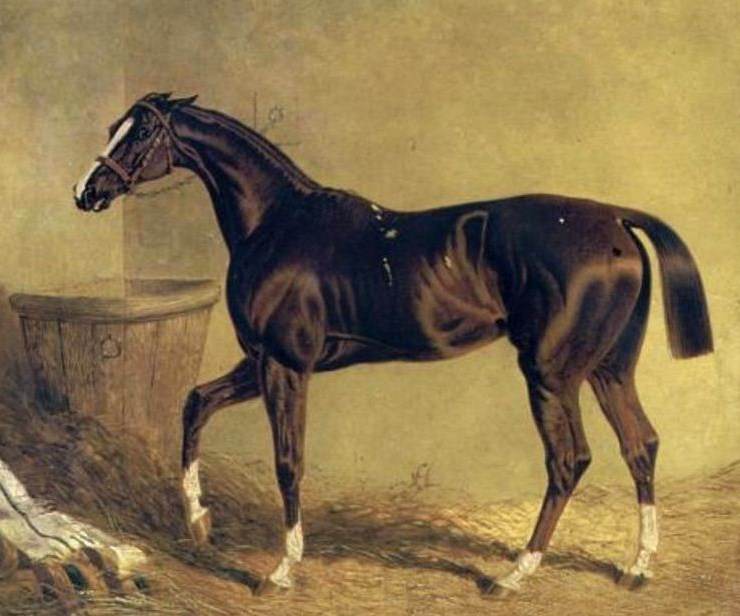
- Camarine by John Frederick Herring Sr.
- Sire: Juniper
- Grandsire: Whiskey
- Dam: Rubens mare
- Damsire: Rubens
- Sex: Mare
- Foaled: 1828
- Country: United Kingdom
- Colour: Chestnut
- Breeder: Robert Wilson, 9th Baron Berners
- Owner: Robert Wilson; Sir Mark Wood, 2nd Baronet
- Trainer: H. Scott
- Record: 14:13-1-0

Major wins
- Newmarket Town Plate (1831); Trial Stakes (1831); Newmarket St Leger (1831); Claret Stakes (1832); Ascot Gold Cup (1832); The Whip (1832); Audley End Stakes (1832); Craven Stakes (1833); King's Plate (Newmarket) (1833); Jockey Club Plate (1833)

Camarine (1828 – 20 March 1841) was a British Thoroughbred racehorse and broodmare. After finishing second on her only start as a two-year-old, Camarine was undefeated for the next three years, winning thirteen consecutive races at distances ranging from five furlongs to two and a half miles. Her dominance over her contemporaries was compared to that of Eclipse sixty years earlier.

The filly was never entered for any of the British Classic Races but proved herself the best of her generation by beating the winners of both The Derby and The Oaks in the space of three days at Newmarket in October 1831. In the following year she won the Ascot Gold Cup, the year's most important weight-for-age race in a run-off after being held to a dead heat by the St Leger winner Rowton. From the summer of 1832, few owners were willing to try their horses against her and she won several prizes by walkover or forfeit. She was retired from racing after sustaining an injury in the spring of 1834. She made little impact as a broodmare and died in 1841.

== Background ==
Camarine was a dark chestnut mare with a white blaze and four white socks bred near Brandon in Suffolk by Robert Wilson, 9th Baron Berners. She was sired by Wilson's horse Juniper, a "useful" stallion, best known as the damsire of Velocipede although he may have been the sire of the 1000 Guineas winner Catgut. Camarine came from Juniper's last crop of foals and was said to bear a striking resemblance to her sire. In early 1831, Camarine was bought by Sir Mark Wood, 2nd Baronet, whose other good horses included Lucetta (Ascot Gold Cup) and Galantine (1000 Guineas).

Camarine's dam, an unnamed mare sired by Rubens out of Tippitywitchet, was one of the outstanding broodmares of her time. Her other foals included The Derby winner Phosphorus (foaled 1834) and the fillies May-day (1831) and Firebrand (1839), both of whom won the 1000 Guineas.

== Racing career ==
=== 1830: two-year-old season ===
Until 1913 there was no requirement for British racehorses to have names, and many horses were known by the name of their owner or their pedigree. The filly who would become known as Camarine made her first appearance as "Col. Wilson's ch. f. by Juniper, dam by Rubens out of Tippitywitchet" in a five furlong race at Newmarket in October 1830. In a field of eighteen juveniles, many of whom were described as "very good-looking things" she started at odds of 10/1 and finished second, a length behind Lord Cleveland's colt by Emilius (later named Marcus). The unplaced horses included the future Epsom Derby winner Spaniel.

=== 1831: three-year-old season ===
The "Juniper filly" had not been entered in any of the British Classic Races, which meant that she had limited opportunities to compete against the best horses of her generation in the early part of 1831. She made her seasonal debut at the Newmarket Craven meeting in April in a weight-for-age race over five furlongs. The filly was made 13/8 favourite in a field of nine runners and won from Guitar, a filly who went on to finish third to Oxygen in the Oaks Stakes. Before her next start, the Juniper filly was sold to Sir Mark Wood for £1,400 and was officially named Camarine. The filly was scheduled to run a match race against the three-year-old colt Zany at the Newmarket Second Spring meeting in May, but was withdrawn from the contest, with Wood paying a £79 forfeit.

Camarine competed in Wood's colours for the first time at the Newmarket July meeting, where she ran twice. On the opening day she started odds-on favourite for a five furlong Sweepstakes and won from Lord Egremont's filly (later named Miss Petworth). The winning margin was only a head, leading some observers to express the view that Wood had paid rather too much for the filly. Two days later she ran over nine furlongs in the Town Plate and won from Wilson's colt Whiskey.

At the Newmarket First October meeting Camarine established herself as the best three-year-old in England in two races in which she faced the winners of that year's Derby and Oaks. On the opening day of the meeting she started joint favourite with the Derby winner Spaniel, and defeated the colt by a length in the Trial Stakes over ten furlongs. Two days later she ran against the Oaks winner Oxygen in the Newmarket St Leger over the two mile "Ditch-In" course. Camarine, who started the even money favourite tracked Oxygen before overtaking the Oaks winner a furlong from the finish. According to the New Sporting Magazine she then "came away from them like a dart" and won very easily by four lengths. In both races she was ridden by James "Jem" Chapple.

=== 1832: four-year-old season ===
Camarine began her four-year-old season in the Claret Stakes over two miles at the Craven meeting in April in which her only rival was Circassian, a Yorkshire-trained filly who had started favourite for the 1831 Oaks. Camarine led from the start and won easily by twenty lengths. Commenting on the performance, the Sporting Magazine likened the winner to "a comet among the stars, bright but of rare occurrence." At the next Newmarket meeting on 8 May Camarine won a Sweepstakes without having to race when the owners of her two opponents agreed to pay a forfeit of £70 each.

In June Camarine raced away from Newmarket for the first time when she ran in the Ascot Gold Cup over two and a half miles in front of a large and enthusiastic crowd which included the King. She was ridden by James Robinson and was opposed by the six-year-old Rowton, the winner of the 1829 St Leger and The Saddler, winner of the 1831 Doncaster Cup. Rowton, ridden by Sam Chifney, made the running from The Saddler, with Camarine held up in third before Robinson moved her up to challenge for the lead in the straight. After a particularly severe contest, Camarine and Rowton crossed the line together, with the judge calling a dead heat. The older horse hung away from the rails and appeared to have hampered the filly in the closing stages; it was only with some difficulty that Wood was persuaded not to lodge a formal objection. A run-off over the same course was arranged to decide the race, and Robinson again restrained the filly in the early stages before overtaking Rowton in the straight and winning by two lengths.

Camarine was rested until autumn when she returned to Newmarket and was able to "win" three successive prizes without having to race. On 2 October the 1830 Derby winner Priam failed to appear for a race against the filly over the four mile Beacon Course, enabling Wood to claim £130 "and the Cup". Two weeks later Wood issued a challenge for "The Whip", a silver trophy which was said to incorporate hairs from the tail and mane of Eclipse. When no horse appeared to oppose Camarine, Wood was able to claim the trophy without a race. At the Houghton meeting on 1 November Camarine was scheduled to run a match race in which she was set to concede nineteen pounds to John Gully's St Leger winner Margrave over ten furlongs. The colt did not appear and Gully paid a forfeit to Wood. On the following day Camarine returned to active competition and ran twice. She began by winning a five furlong match for £200 against Mr M Stanley's horse Crutch. Later in the afternoon she carried top weight of 130 pounds in the Audley End Stakes over one and three quarter miles. Ridden again by Robinson she started 4/6 favourite and won from Mr Day's horse Mazeppa and three others.

=== 1833: five-year-old season ===
On the opening day of the 1833 Newmarket season, Camarine started the 1/4 favourite for the Craven Stakes, a weight-for-age race over ten furlongs. The mare won "in a canter" by a length from Rubini, only for the race to be declared void by the judge who decided that a false start had caused two horses to be left behind. The race was re-run immediately and Camarine won again, beating Lady Charlotte and Fang, the two horses who had not competed in the original race, by a margin of six lengths. The race was likened to watching "countrymen on foot running after a wild stag". At the First Spring meeting no horses appeared to challenge Camarine, who was allowed to walk over in a 100 guinea King's Plate and a £50 race over the Beacon Course. Camarine made her final appearance at the Second Spring meeting in May. Running over the Beacon Course, she won the Jockey Club Plate by eight lengths from her only opponent, Lord Tavistock's seven-year-old Taurus.

Camarine was entered in a match race against Circassian in April 1834, but Wood paid a forfeit as the mare was "reported amiss". Camarine never raced again and was retired to stud.

== Assessment ==
Commenting on the mare's career, the Sporting Magazine compared her superiority over her opponents to that demonstrated by the undefeated eighteenth century champion Eclipse while the New Sporting Magazine called her "the best mare in Europe" in 1833.

James Christie Whyte in his History of the British turf from the earliest period to the present day (London 1840) described Camarine's achievements as being "unequalled in the annals of turf history for excellence".

== Breeding record ==
In her first season as a broodmare, Camarine was covered by her former rival Rowton, and produced a colt named Glenlivat. Her next five seasons however, saw her produce no foals which lived to maturity. On the death of Mark Wood in 1837 she was offered for sale and bought for 1,550 guineas by Lord George Bentinck. At the same sale, Glenlivat became the most expensive yearling ever sold at auction when he was bought for 1,010 guineas by the Duke of Richmond. Glenlivat eventually won two small races but was not a top class runner. He died in 1841 in the same year as his dam.

Camarine died on 20 March 1841, about an hour after giving birth to a filly foal by Bay Middleton.

== Pedigree ==
Pedigree of Camarine (GB), chestnut mare, 1828
Sire Juniper (GB) 1805	Whiskey; 1789	Saltram	Eclipse
Sire Juniper (GB) 1805	Whiskey; 1789	Saltram	Virago
Sire Juniper (GB) 1805	Whiskey; 1789	Calash	Herod
Sire Juniper (GB) 1805	Whiskey; 1789	Calash	Teresa
Sire Juniper (GB) 1805	Jenny Spinner; 1797	Dragon	Woodpecker
Sire Juniper (GB) 1805	Jenny Spinner; 1797	Dragon	Juno
Sire Juniper (GB) 1805	Jenny Spinner; 1797	Eclipse mare	Eclipse
Sire Juniper (GB) 1805	Jenny Spinner; 1797	Eclipse mare	Miss Spindleshanks
Dam Rubens mare (GB) 1819	Rubens; 1805	Buzzard	Woodpecker
Dam Rubens mare (GB) 1819	Rubens; 1805	Buzzard	Misfortune
Dam Rubens mare (GB) 1819	Rubens; 1805	Alexander mare	Alexander
Dam Rubens mare (GB) 1819	Rubens; 1805	Alexander mare	Highflyer mare
Dam Rubens mare (GB) 1819	Tippitywitchet; 1808	Waxy	Potoooooooo
Dam Rubens mare (GB) 1819	Tippitywitchet; 1808	Waxy	Maria
Dam Rubens mare (GB) 1819	Tippitywitchet; 1808	Hare	Sweetbriar
Dam Rubens mare (GB) 1819	Tippitywitchet; 1808	Hare	Justice mare (Family: 27)

- Camarine was inbred 4 x 4 to Woodpecker and Eclipse, meaning that both of these stallions appear twice in the fourth generation of her pedigree.
