= 1819 in sports =

1819 in sports describes the year's events in world sport.

== Boxing ==
Events

- Tom Cribb retains his English championship but no fights involving him are recorded in 1819.

== Cricket ==
Events

- 7 September — death of Lumpy Stevens, arguably the greatest bowler of the 18th century

England

- Most runs – Thomas Beagley 170 (HS 75)
- Most wickets – Thomas Howard 23 (BB 5–?)

== Horse racing ==
England

- 1,000 Guineas Stakes – Catgut
- 2,000 Guineas Stakes – Antar
- The Derby – Tiresias
- The Oaks – Shoveler
- St. Leger Stakes – Antonio

== Artistic gymnastics ==
Germany

- The parallel bars (in German Barren) were invented by German Friedrich Ludwig Jahn in Berlin.
