= May-day =

British-bred Thoroughbred racehorse

- Sire: Lamplighter
- Grandsire: Merlin
- Dam: Rubens mare
- Damsire: Rubens
- Sex: Filly
- Foaled: 1831
- Country: United Kingdom
- Colour: Chestnut
- Breeder: Robert Wilson, 9th Baron Berners
- Owner: Robert Wilson, 9th Baron Berners
- Trainer: J. Doe
- Record: 3:1-0-0

Major wins
- 1000 Guineas (1834)

May-day (1831 – 30 May 1834) was a British Thoroughbred racehorse who won the classic 1000 Guineas at Newmarket Racecourse in 1834. On her only subsequent start she was fatally injured in the Oaks Stakes at Epsom.

== Background ==
May-day was a chestnut filly bred near Brandon in Suffolk by her owner Robert Wilson, 9th Baron Berners. She was sired by Wilson's own stallion Lamplighter, a successful racehorse who won the Craven Stakes, The Whip and several King's Plates at Newmarket. May-day's dam, the Rubens mare, was an unnamed daughter of Rubens out of Tippitywitchet and was one of the outstanding broodmares of her time. Her other foals included the Ascot Gold Cup winner Camarine (foaled 1828), The Derby winner Phosphorus (1834) and the 1000 Guineas winner Firebrand (1839). Both Phosphorus and Firebrand were sired by Lamplighter making them full siblings to May-day.

== Racing career ==
=== 1833: two-year-old season ===
Until 1913 there was no requirement for British racehorses to have names, and many horses were known by the name of their owner or their pedigree. The filly who would become known as May-day made her first appearance as "Ld Berners's ch. f. by Lamplighter, out of Camarine's dam" in the Criterion Stakes at Newmarket on 28 October 1830. She was made the 4/1 second favourite in a field of thirteen two-year-olds, but finished unplaced behind Bentley.

=== 1834: three-year-old season ===
The Lamplighter filly made her first appearance as a three-year-old in the twenty-first running of the 1000 Guineas Stakes at Newmarket on 1 May (May Day) 1834. She was ridden by John Barham Day and started at odds of 6/1 in field of seven fillies for the classic over the Ditch Mile course. The field was considered a good one and the early pace was strong. Day produced the filly with a late run on the outside to take the lead inside the final furlong and won comfortably by a length from Mr Walker's filly Velocity with Amadou in third and the favourite, Rosalie, unplaced. The New Sporting Magazine described her as "a fine, racing-like mare" whose "speed and stoutness" made her a serious contender for the Oaks. Following the 1000 Guineas, Lord Berners named his filly May-day "in honour of the day of her first victory".

Four weeks after her win at Newmarket, May-day was moved up in distance to contest the Oaks over one and a half miles at Epsom. She started the 7/1 third favourite against fourteen opponents. The race was delayed by half an hour by a series of false starts and the early pace was unusually slow. May-day, ridden by Frank Boyce was restrained by her jockey until the straight where she moved up on the outside and had "the appearance of a winner" when she fell heavily approaching the final furlong. May-day got to her feet but had sustained a complete fracture of her left foreleg just above the fetlock and was immediately euthanised. The race was won by the 20/1 outsider Pussy.

== Pedigree ==
Pedigree of May-day (GB), chestnut filly, 1831
Sire Lamplighter(GB) 1823	Merlin; 1815	Castrel	Buzzard*
Sire Lamplighter(GB) 1823	Merlin; 1815	Castrel	Alexander mare*
Sire Lamplighter(GB) 1823	Merlin; 1815	Newton	Delpini
Sire Lamplighter(GB) 1823	Merlin; 1815	Newton	Tipple Cyder
Sire Lamplighter(GB) 1823	Spotless; 1809	Walton	Sir Peter Teazle
Sire Lamplighter(GB) 1823	Spotless; 1809	Walton	Arethusa
Sire Lamplighter(GB) 1823	Spotless; 1809	Trumpator mare	Trumpator
Sire Lamplighter(GB) 1823	Spotless; 1809	Trumpator mare	Highflyer mare (1793)
Dam Rubens mare (GB) 1819	Rubens; 1805	Buzzard*	Woopecker
Dam Rubens mare (GB) 1819	Rubens; 1805	Buzzard*	Misfortune
Dam Rubens mare (GB) 1819	Rubens; 1805	Alexander mare*	Alexander
Dam Rubens mare (GB) 1819	Rubens; 1805	Alexander mare*	Highflyer mare (1780)
Dam Rubens mare (GB) 1819	Tippitywitchet; 1808	Waxy	Potoooooooo
Dam Rubens mare (GB) 1819	Tippitywitchet; 1808	Waxy	Maria
Dam Rubens mare (GB) 1819	Tippitywitchet; 1808	Hare	Sweetbriar
Dam Rubens mare (GB) 1819	Tippitywitchet; 1808	Hare	Justice mare (Family:27)
