= Rubens mare =

British-bred Thoroughbred racehorse

- Sire: Rubens
- Grandsire: Buzzard
- Dam: Tippitywitchet
- Damsire: Waxy
- Sex: Mare
- Foaled: 1819
- Country: Great Britain
- Colour: Chestnut
- Breeder: Major Wilson
- Owner: Major Wilson
- Record: 1: 0-1-0
- Earnings: 100 gs

The Rubens mare (foaled 1819) was an unnamed British Thoroughbred racehorse. In her only race she finished second in The Oaks in 1822. Later she became a top broodmare, foaling Ascot Gold Cup winner Camarine, 1000 Guineas winners May-day and Firebrand and Epsom Derby winner Phosphorus.

== Background ==
The Rubens mare was a chestnut filly foaled in 1819 and bred by Major Wilson. She was an unnamed daughter of Craven Stakes winner Rubens. Rubens was also a successful stallion and was the leading sire in Great Britain and Ireland three times. His other progeny included Landscape, Pastille and Whizgig. The Rubens mare's dam was, Tippitywitchet, a daughter of Derby winner Waxy.

== Racing career ==
The Rubens mare made her only start on 24 May 1822 at Epsom Downs, when she and nine opponents raced for the Oaks Stakes. The Duke of Grafton's 1000 Guineas winner Whizgig started as the 11/8 favourite, with Pastille, who was also owned by Grafton, second favourite at 7/2. Major Wilson's Rubens mare was a relative outsider at about 12/1. Whizgig led the race from Pastille. The Rubens mare challenged and overtook Whizgig in the closing stages to take the lead, before Pastille passed her near the line and won by a head. Pastille and the Rubens mare finished clear of the rest of the field. The race was described as "as good a race ever seen for the Oaks."

== Stud career ==
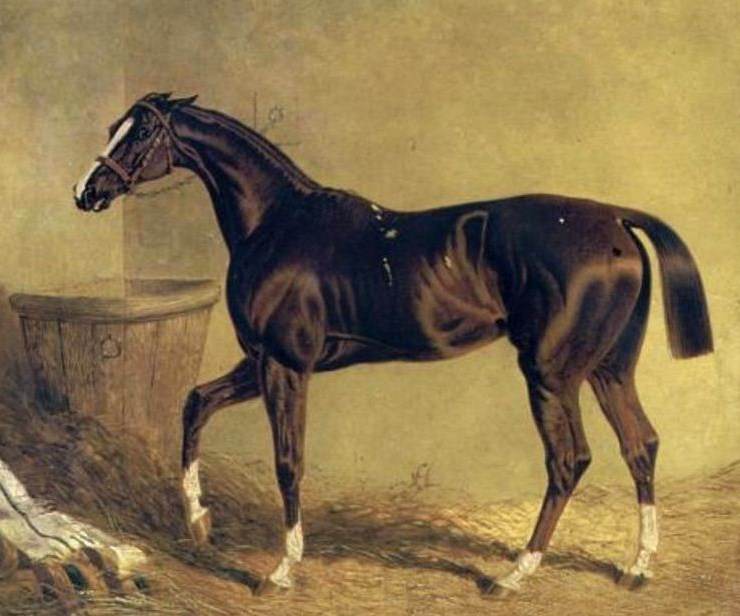
The Rubens mare's daughter Camarine

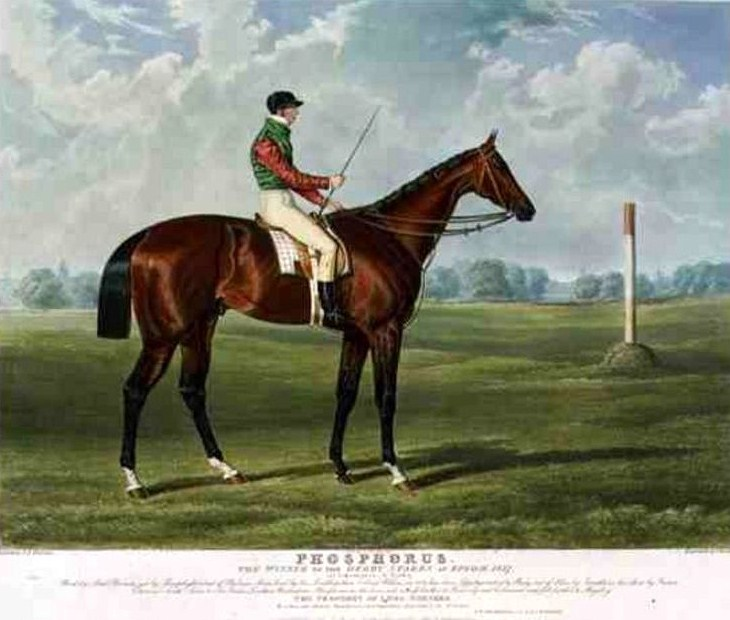
The Rubens mare's son Phosphorus

The Rubens mare was retired to Colonel Wilson's stud. During her career as a broodmare she produced eighteen foals in total. They were:

- Care – a bay mare foaled in 1825 and sire by Woful. Her daughter Blue Devils foaled the dam of Goodwood Cup winner Saunterer.
- Hazard colt – a chestnut colt foaled in 1826.
- Recovery – a chestnut stallion foaled in 1827 and sired by Emilius. Raced from 1830 to 1832 and won several races, including a 100 guineas Sweepstakes at Newmarket in 1830 and a match race against St. Leger winner Birmingham in 1831. Matthew Cotes Wyatt used Recovery as a model for the Duke of Wellington's deceased horse Copenhagen, when creating the Wellington Statue in Aldershot. Recovery's was the damsire of Rococo, who sired Cesarewitch Stakes winner Chippendale.
- Camarine – a chestnut mare foaled in 1828 and sired by Juniper. She won the Ascot Gold Cup in 1832 and in 1833 was described as "the best mare in Europe."
- Oscar mare – a chestnut mare foaled in 1829. Went to King William IV's stud. Her daughter The Soldier's Daughter foaled Chester Cup winner Red Deer.
- Danoise – a chestnut mare foaled in 1830 and sired by Oscar. Through her daughter Lantern, her dam-line produced Stewards' Cup winner Royal Flush.
- May-day – a chestnut filly foaled in 1831 and sired by Lamplighter. In 1834 she won the 1000 Guineas, but broke her leg in the Oaks and had to be destroyed.
- Jack in the Green – a chestnut colt foaled in 1833 and sired by Lamplighter. He finished third in the 2000 Guineas in 1836. In 1837 he won the Plymouth Plate and Her Majesty's Cup.
- Phosphorus – a bay stallion foaled in 1834 and sired by Lamplighter. He won the 1837 Epsom Derby at the price of 40/1. He stood as a sire in Germany.
- Phoebe – a bay mare foaled in 1836 and sired by Lamplighter. She was put to stud and produced her first foal in 1840.
- Firefly – a bay filly foaled in 1837 and sired by Lamplighter. She raced in 1840.
- Lamplighter colt – a chestnut colt foaled in 1838.
- Firebrand – a chestnut mare foaled in 1839 and sired by Lamplighter. She won the 1000 Guineas by a length in 1842. She produced one foal in Britain, before being sold to go abroad.
- Farintosh – a bay colt foaled in 1840 and sired by Bay Middleton
- Bay Middleton filly – foaled in 1841. She died in foal.
- Ratajia – a bay mare foaled in 1842 and sired by Bay Middleton. She was the granddam of Arbitrator, who sired St. Leger Stakes winner Kilwarlin.
- Lanercost colt – foaled in 1844.
- Colwick foal – foaled in 1845.

== Pedigree ==
Pedigree of Rubens mare, chestnut mare, 1819
Sire Rubens (GB) ch. 1805	Buzzard (GB); 1788	Woodpecker; 1773	Herod*
Sire Rubens (GB) ch. 1805	Buzzard (GB); 1788	Woodpecker; 1773	Miss Ramsden
Sire Rubens (GB) ch. 1805	Buzzard (GB); 1788	Misfortune; 1775	Dux
Sire Rubens (GB) ch. 1805	Buzzard (GB); 1788	Misfortune; 1775	Curiosity
Sire Rubens (GB) ch. 1805	Alexander mare (GB)	Alexander ch. 1782	Eclipse*
Sire Rubens (GB) ch. 1805	Alexander mare (GB)	Alexander ch. 1782	Grecian Princess
Sire Rubens (GB) ch. 1805	Alexander mare (GB)	Highflyer mare	Highflyer
Sire Rubens (GB) ch. 1805	Alexander mare (GB)	Highflyer mare	Alfred mare
Dam Tippitywitchet (GB) ch. 1808	Waxy (GB) b. 1790	Pot-8-Os; 1773	Eclipse*
Dam Tippitywitchet (GB) ch. 1808	Waxy (GB) b. 1790	Pot-8-Os; 1773	Sportsmistress
Dam Tippitywitchet (GB) ch. 1808	Waxy (GB) b. 1790	Maria; 1777	Herod*
Dam Tippitywitchet (GB) ch. 1808	Waxy (GB) b. 1790	Maria; 1777	Lisette
Dam Tippitywitchet (GB) ch. 1808	Hare (GB); 1794	Sweetbriar; 1769	Syphon
Dam Tippitywitchet (GB) ch. 1808	Hare (GB); 1794	Sweetbriar; 1769	Shakespear mare
Dam Tippitywitchet (GB) ch. 1808	Hare (GB); 1794	Justice mare 1786	Justice
Dam Tippitywitchet (GB) ch. 1808	Hare (GB); 1794	Justice mare 1786	Chymist mare

Note: b. = Bay, ch. = Chestnut

* The Rubens mare was inbred 4×4 to both Herod and Eclipse. This means that the stallions appear twice in the fourth generation of her pedigree.
