= 1842 in sports =

1842 in sports describes the year's events in world sport.

== Boxing ==
Events

- William "Bendigo" Thompson contemplates a comeback but no one will challenge Ben Caunt for his English Championship.

== Cricket ==
Events

- 6 August — formation of the original Kent County Cricket Club in Canterbury (it will be reformed as the present club in 1859).
- 25, 26 & 27 August — the new Kent CCC plays its inaugural first-class match v. England at the White Hart Ground, Bromley

England

- Most runs – Nicholas Felix 406 @ 31.23 (HS 88)
- Most wickets – William Hillyer 127 @ 13.42 (BB 8–?)

== Horse racing ==
England

- Grand National – Gaylad
- 1,000 Guineas Stakes – Firebrand
- 2,000 Guineas Stakes – Meteor
- The Derby – Attila
- The Oaks – Our Nell
- St. Leger Stakes – Blue Bonnet

== Rowing ==
The Boat Race

- 11 June — Oxford wins the 6th Oxford and Cambridge Boat Race

Other events

- The first American collegiate rowing club is established at Yale University on the Thames River (Connecticut)
