= Alfred Day (jockey) =

British jockey (1830–1868)

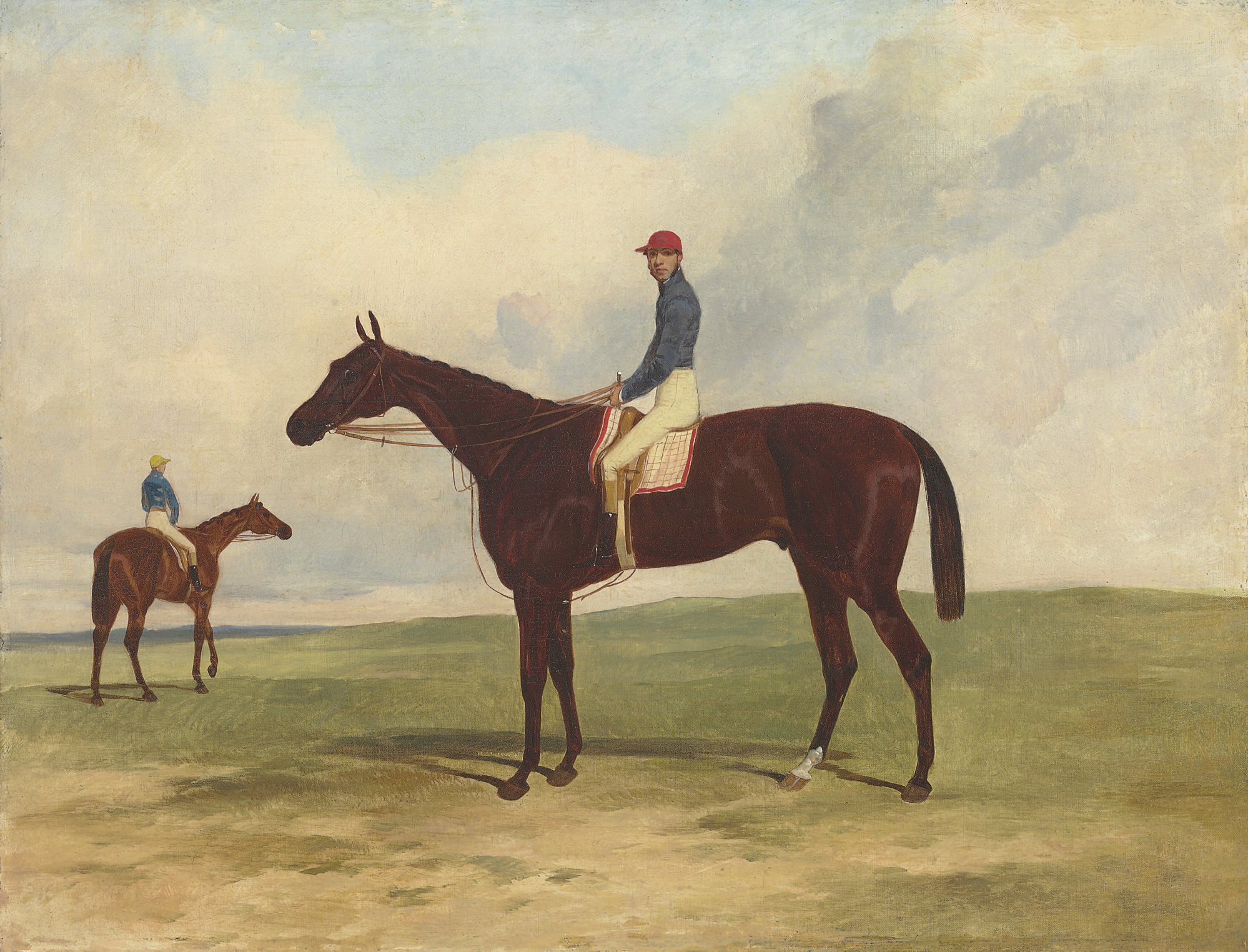
- Alfred Day riding on Andover

Personal information
- Born: 3 November 1830
- Died: 4 January 1868 (aged 37)
- Occupation: Jockey

Horse racing career
- Sport: Horse racing

Major racing wins
- Major races 1,000 Guineas Stakes (1849, 1852); 2,000 Guineas Stakes (1850, 1854, 1859); Ascot Gold Cup (1847, 1848, 1854); Epsom Derby (1854); Epsom Oaks (1856)

Significant horses
- Andover, Flea, Kate, Mincepie, Pitsford, The Hermit, The Hero, The Promised Land, West Australian

Alfred Day (3 November 1830 – 4 January 1868) was a British classic winning jockey. He won seven classics between 1849 and 1859, including the Derby on Andover, and was nicknamed "King Alfred" for his success.

== Career ==
Day was born into a famous racing family that included his father John Barham Day and several jockey brothers. He was born on 3 November 1830 and baptised on 6 October 1833 at St Edith's Church, Monks Kirby, a village in north-eastern Warwickshire. He was educated at Winchester and, in the holidays, rode his father's horses on Stockbridge Downs.

He rode in the 1843 Cesarewitch, aged just 12 and weighing 4st 7lbs, on a three-year-old called Shocking Mamma, but he first came to prominence at the age of 14, when he won the Goodwood Stakes on Mr Wreford's Flea, at a weight of 6 stone. Then, in 1847 and 1848, he won consecutive Ascot Gold Cups on The Hero, during the period when the race was known as the Emperor's Plate. He went on to ride for some of the most titled people in the land, including Sir Robert Peel and Lords Clifden, Derby and Palmerston.

During his career, he was closely associated with the stables of his brothers John and William and it was for them he won his classics. For John, he won four classics, and for William one.

His first classic came for John in the 1850 2,000 Guineas. Day was on 5/2 second favourite Pitsford and held on for a neck win. He took another 2,000 Guineas in 1854 on The Hermit, again trained by his brother John, and owned by John Gully. Gully also owned Andover, on which he won the Derby. He was fortunate to win the 1856 Oaks on Mincepie – the runner-up, ridden by Robert Sly, should have won easily.

He won his final classic, the 1859 2,000 Guineas, for his other brother William, on The Promised Land.

The 1854 Ascot Gold Cup gave him one of the greatest races of his career, when he beat Kingston by a head on the famous West Australian.

His final ride came at Epsom on 17 April 1863 on a horse called Golden Dust that finished second.

He died on 4 January 1868, aged 37.

== Riding style and personality ==
Day was a "natural horseman" with "exceptionally fine judgement", and was perceived as a "more accomplished rider" than his brothers. George Lowe of the Sporting Life described him as "absolute perfection in seat and hands, and the way he dropped on an opponent in the last fifty yards could never be forgotten". Physically, he was "long in the leg, but very perfectly made."

In common with other members of his family, he was not entirely trustworthy. In the 1859 Derby, he finished third on Trumpeter, beaten half a length and a neck by Musjid and Marionette, a horse he had a part share in. He was threatened with not being able to ride again until he disposed of this share.

Alfred enjoyed riding to hounds on his favourite horse, Stonehenge.

== Major wins ==
(United Kingdom) Great Britain

- 1,000 Guineas Stakes - (2) - The Flea (1849), Kate (1852)
- 2,000 Guineas Stakes - (3) - Pitsford (1850), The Hermit (1854), The Promised Land (1859)
- Ascot Gold Cup - (3) - The Hero (1847, 1848), West Australian (1854)
- Epsom Derby - Andover (1854)
- Epsom Oaks - Mincepie (1856)

== Bibliography ==
- Lambie, James (9 September 2010). The Story of Your Life: A History of the Sporting Life Newspaper (1859-1998). London. ISBN 9781848762916.
- Mortimer, Roger; Onslow, Richard; Willett, Peter (1978). Biographical Encyclopedia of British Flat Racing. Macdonald and Jane’s. ISBN 0-354-08536-0.
