= Rowton (horse) =

British-bred Thoroughbred racehorse

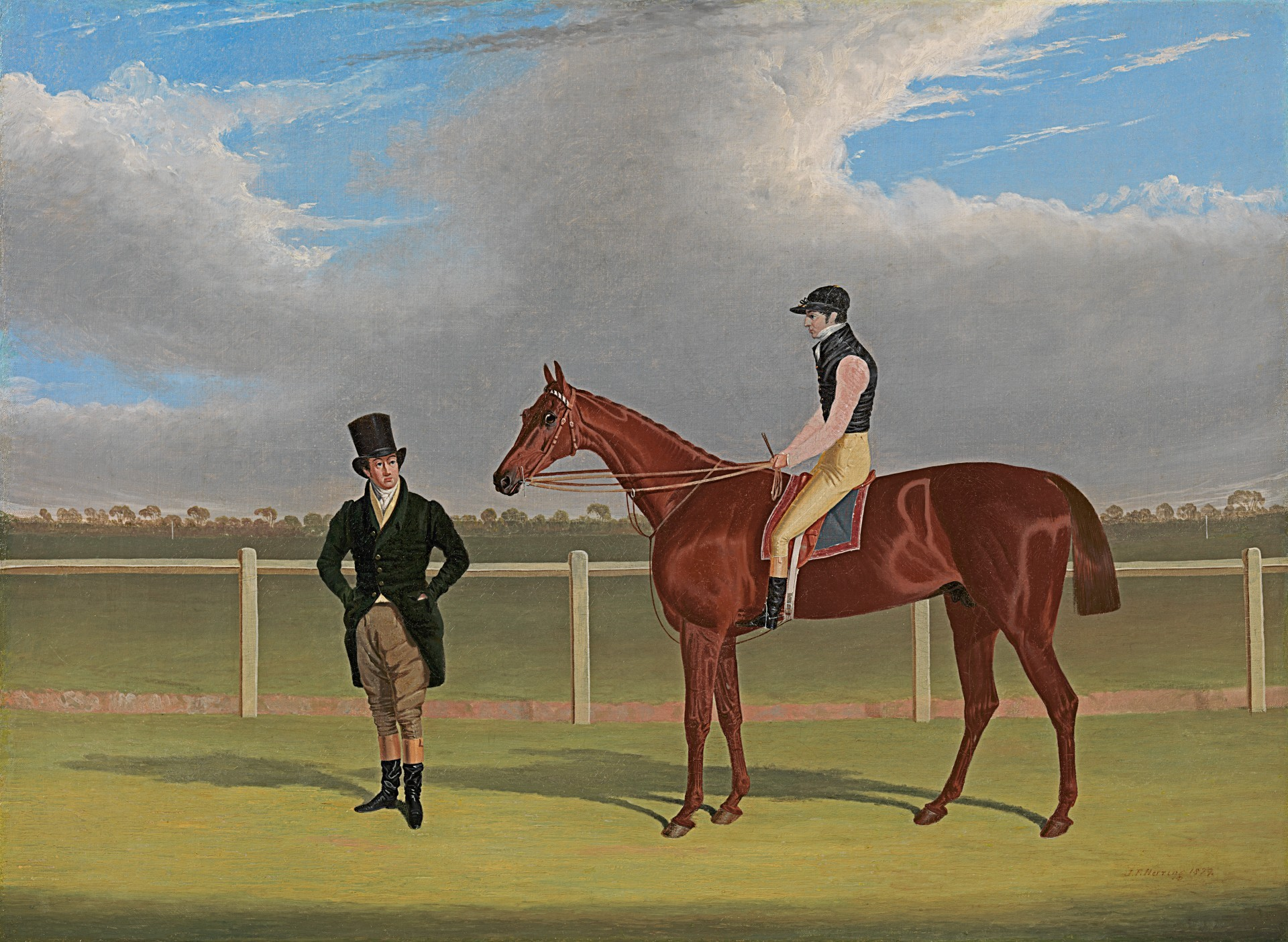
- The Hon. E. Petre's Rowton with W. Scott up and his trainer at Doncaster by John Frederick Herring, Sr.
- Sire: Oiseau
- Grandsire: Camillus
- Dam: Katherina
- Damsire: Woful
- Sex: Stallion
- Foaled: 1826
- Country: United Kingdom
- Colour: Chestnut
- Breeder: Edward Petre
- Owner: Edward Petre; William Chifney
- Trainer: John Scott; William Chifney
- Record: 11:7-2-2

Major wins
- York Two-year-old Stake (1828); St Leger Stakes (1829); Great Subscription Purse (1831); Oatlands Stakes (1832)

Rowton (1826–1841) was a British-bred Thoroughbred racehorse and sire best known for winning the St Leger Stakes in 1829. He was lightly campaigned during his racing career, competing in eleven races in five seasons and winning seven times. Until his last competitive season he was raced exclusively in Yorkshire running only at the meetings at York in August and Doncaster in September. Apart from the St Leger, his wins included the York Two-year-old Stake, the Great Subscription Purse and a division of the Oatlands Stakes. On his final appearance he ran a dead heat for the Ascot Gold Cup before being beaten in a run-off by the filly Camarine. After three seasons at stud in England he was exported to the United States where he died in 1841.

== Background ==
Rowton was a dark-coated chestnut horse with no white markings who stood 15.2 hands high when fully grown. Henry Hall Dixon described him as being "as nearly perfection as possible", with "beautiful quarters", a "deer-like" head and an "exquisitely expressive eye".

He was owned and bred by Edward Petre (1794–1848), a free-spending sportsman and gambler, who was a younger son of Robert Petre, 9th Baron Petre. Like the rest of Petre's horses, Rowton was trained by John Scott, who sent out the winners of 41 classics, from his Whitewall Stables at Malton in North Yorkshire. Rowton was ridden in most of his races by his trainer's younger brother Bill Scott.

Rowton was the only classic winner sired by Oiseau (1809–1826), a horse who was undefeated in a five race career, and who stood as a breeding stallion in both Ireland and England. Rowton's dam Katherina (also known as Perspective) was a daughter of the Oaks winner Landscape and was also closely related to the St Leger winner Ashton.

== Racing career ==
=== 1828: two-year-old season ===
Rowton began his racing career at York Racecourse in August 1828. He started the 5/4 favourite for the Two-year-old Stake against eleven opponents. He was ridden in aggressive style by Bill Scott, who made use of the whip and at one point barged another runner into the rails before Rowton won "rather cleverly" by one and a half lengths. The Sporting Magazine's correspondent was not impressed by Rowton's physical appearance, describing him as having "a very long carcase" and showing "too much daylight underneath him to go a long distance".

At the St Leger meeting at Doncaster Racecourse in September, Rowton ran in the Champagne Stakes, a race which attracted many of the best two-year-olds seen in the North of England that season. Bill Scott was taken ill just before the start of the race and was replaced by Bill Arnull. Rowton finished third of the nine runners behind Cant, a small but "pretty" colt owned by Lord Sligo. Three days later, Rowton contested the Two-year-old Stake at the same course. He was reunited with Bill Scott and started favourite, but after "a most excellent race" he was beaten a head by the filly Lady Sarah.

=== 1829: three-year-old season ===
Rowton did not run as a three-year-old before his run in the Great St Leger Stakes at Doncaster on 15 September, although he had been strongly supported in the betting for the race since early in the year. Despite his lack of a recent run he was made 7/2 favourite in a field of nineteen runners which included The Derby winner Frederick and the previously undefeated colts Voltaire and Sir Hercules. Ridden by Bill Scott, Rowton led from the start and set an extremely strong pace. In the closing stages he was challenged by Voltaire, who had come from well back in the field, but under a "severe" ride from Scott, Rowton held on to win by half a length, with Sir Hercules in third. Voltaire was considered by some to have been an unlucky loser, with his jockey, Sam Chifney being criticised for his exaggerated waiting tactics. His owner, Lord Darlington however, declined the offer of a match race between the two colts, even when Rowton's connections offered to run the race with the St Leger winner carrying seven pounds more than his rival. Rowton's success was a third consecutive win in the race for John Scott and Edward Petre following Matilda in 1827 and The Colonel in 1828. On the following afternoon, Rowton was able to claim a £350 prize for his owner without having to race when he was allowed to walk over in the Foal Stakes, the other five entrants having been withdrawn.

=== 1830: four-year-old season ===
John Scott had predicted that Rowton would be better at four, but the horse had little chance to prove his trainer correct as his third season consisted of a single race. On 22 September, one year and four days after his last appearance, he ran in a sweepstakes for four-year-olds over the St Leger course at Doncaster. Ridden as usual by Bill Scott, he started 1/2 favourite and won from his only opponent, Lord Cleveland's colt Stotforth.

=== 1831: five-year-old season ===
Rowton was slightly more active in 1831, although his campaign was restricted to three races in Yorkshire. On 5 August he competed away from Doncaster for the first time since 1828 when he was one of four horses to contest the two-mile Great Subscription Purse for four- and five-year-olds at York. He started and even money favourite and won by three quarters of a length from Lord Scarborough's four-year-old Windcliffe, to whom he was conceding seven pounds.

In September, Rowton appeared at the Doncaster St Leger meeting for the fourth year in succession, his target on this occasion being the Gold Cup over two miles five furlongs. He sustained his first defeat for three years as he finished third of the seven runners behind Mr Wagstaff's three-year-old The Saddler. On the following afternoon he was moved up in distance to contest a sweepstakes over four miles and won by "half a head" from Medoro after an "excellent contest".

=== 1832: six-year-old season ===
In 1832, Petre sold Rowton for 1,000 guineas to the brothers William and Sam Chifney, who formed a trainer-jockey team at their base at Newmarket. Sam Chifney, despite his efforts in the 1829 St Leger, was renowned for his tactical skill, being particularly adept at winning races with a late challenge which became known as the "Chifney Rush". The Chifney brother brought Rowton south with the Gold Cup at Ascot as their principal objective.

On 19 June, the opening day of the Ascot meeting, he was assigned top weight of 129 pounds in the Oatlands Stakes, a handicap race over the Gold Cup distance of two and a half miles. Sam Chifney positioned the 5/2 favourite behind the leaders before making his challenge inside the final furlong. Rowton accelerated into the lead and won comfortably by three-quarters of a length from Paddy and The Saddler, with the 1830 Gold Cup winner Lucetta unplaced.

Two days later, Rowton was matched against the outstanding racemare Camarine (ridden by Jem Robinson) in the Gold Cup, with The Saddler being the only other starter. Chifney abandoned his usual waiting tactics and sent Rowton into the lead from the start, setting a steady pace. Robinson produced Camarine with a strong challenge in the straight, but Rowton responded and after a severe contest the race ended in a dead-heat. Chifney again led from the start in the deciding heat, but on this occasion Rowton was unable to repel the filly's challenge and was beaten two lengths.

== Stud career ==
Rowton was retired from racing and stood as a stallion in Britain for three years. In 1834, the Chifney brothers' financial problems led them to sell him for 1000 guineas to Jem Bland. Rowton sired no major winners but his daughters produced the 1000 Guineas winners Virago and The Flea. In 1835 he was sold to Merritt & Co and exported to stand at Hicksford in Virginia. Rowton suffered from rheumatism after his arrival in the United States and died in July 1841.

In death, Rowton was partly returned to Yorkshire, as one of his leg bones was made into the handle of a carving knife used by John Scott in his dining room at Malton.

== Pedigree ==
Pedigree of Rowton (GB), chestnut stallion, 1826
Sire Oiseau (GB) 1809	Camillus (GB); 1803	Hambletonian	King Fergus
Sire Oiseau (GB) 1809	Camillus (GB); 1803	Hambletonian	Grey Highflyer
Sire Oiseau (GB) 1809	Camillus (GB); 1803	Faith	Pacolet
Sire Oiseau (GB) 1809	Camillus (GB); 1803	Faith	Atalanta
Sire Oiseau (GB) 1809	Ruler mare (GB); 1797	Ruler	Young Marske
Sire Oiseau (GB) 1809	Ruler mare (GB); 1797	Ruler	Flora
Sire Oiseau (GB) 1809	Ruler mare (GB); 1797	Treecreeper	Woodpecker*^
Sire Oiseau (GB) 1809	Ruler mare (GB); 1797	Treecreeper	Trentham mare
Dam Katherina (GB) 1817	Woful (GB); 1809	Waxy	Potoooooooo
Dam Katherina (GB) 1817	Woful (GB); 1809	Waxy	Maria
Dam Katherina (GB) 1817	Woful (GB); 1809	Penelope	Trumpator
Dam Katherina (GB) 1817	Woful (GB); 1809	Penelope	Prunella
Dam Katherina (GB) 1817	Landscape (GB); 1813	Rubens	Buzzard^
Dam Katherina (GB) 1817	Landscape (GB); 1813	Rubens	Alexander mare
Dam Katherina (GB) 1817	Landscape (GB); 1813	Housemaid	Brush
Dam Katherina (GB) 1817	Landscape (GB); 1813	Housemaid	Herod mare (Family: 29)

*^ Rowton is inbred 4S x 5D to the stallion Woodpecker, meaning that he appears fourth generation on the sire side of his pedigree and fifth generation (via Buzzard)^ on the dam side of his pedigree.
