= Firebrand (horse) =

British-bred Thoroughbred racehorse

- Sire: Lamplighter
- Grandsire: Merlin
- Dam: Rubens mare
- Damsire: Rubens
- Sex: Mare
- Foaled: 1839
- Country: United Kingdom
- Colour: Chestnut
- Breeder: Robert Wilson, 9th Baron Berners
- Owner: Lord George Bentinck
- Trainer: John Kent, Jr.
- Record: 10:2-2-2

Major wins
- 1000 Guineas (1842)

Firebrand (1839–1861) was a British Thoroughbred racehorse and broodmare who won the classic 1000 Guineas at Newmarket Racecourse in 1842. The race was the only competitive win of the filly's racing career: her other success came when she was allowed to walk over at Newmarket a year later. In all, Firebrand ran ten times between July 1841 and May 1843, recording two wins and four places.

== Background ==
Firebrand was a chestnut mare bred by her owner Lord George Bentinck from two horses bred and owned by Robert Wilson, 9th Baron Berners who died in 1838. Firebrand was sired by Wilson's stallion Lamplighter, a successful racehorse who won the Craven Stakes, The Whip and several King's Plates at Newmarket. Firebrand's dam, the Rubens mare, was an unnamed daughter of Rubens out of Tippitywitchet, was one of the outstanding broodmares of her time. Her other foals included the Ascot Gold Cup winner Camarine (foaled 1828), The Derby winner Phosphorus (1834) and the 1000 Guineas winner May-day (1831). Both Phosphorus and May-day were sired by Lamplighter making them full siblings to Firebrand.

Firebrand was a lightly built, delicate filly and Bentinck sought to build her strength with an experimental diet consisting of milk, flour and newly laid eggs. He purchased several cows to provide the milk, and insisted that the eggs should be marked with the farmer's initials to guarantee their provenance and freshness.

== Racing career ==
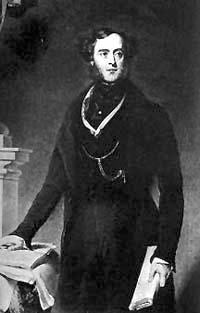
Lord George Bentinck, who bred and owned Firebrand

=== 1841: two-year-old season ===
Firebrand made her only appearance as a two-year-old in the Ham Stakes at Goodwood on 27 July. She was not among the favourites in the nine runner field and finished unplaced behind Wiseacre.

=== 1842: three-year-old season ===
On her three-year-old debut Firebrand contested the 1000 Guineas Stakes over the Ditch Mile at Newmarket on 28 April. Seven of the original twenty-one entries appeared for the race, with Lord Exeter's filly Celia starting favourite ahead of Eliza, Equation and Passion. Firebrand, whose odds were not recorded in the Racing Calendar, created an upset, winning by a length from Celia with Eliza in third place. Following her classic success, the filly was described in the New Sporting Almanack as a "weedy-speedy creature". A month after her win at Newmarket, Firebrand was moved up in distance to challenge for the Oaks Stakes over one and a half miles at Epsom. She was fourth choice in the betting at odds of 9/1 after being heavily backed by her owner. Firebrand moved into the lead early in the straight but faded in the closing stages and finished third, beaten two lengths by Our Nell and Meal.

In June Firebrand was sent to race at Ascot where she finished second, beaten a neck by a colt named Auckland, in a £200 Sweepstakes. In the following month she finished unplaced in the Liverpool St Leger and then ran twice at Goodwood. She was beaten more than twenty lengths when running third to Robert de Gorham in the Gratwicke Stakes and then finished third again in the Nassau Stakes three days later.

In September, Firebrand was sent to Doncaster Racecourse where she ran in the Park Hill Stakes over the St Leger course and distance. She finished fourth of the five runners behind Colonel Cradock's filly Sally, who defeated the St Leger winner Blue Bonnet by a neck.

=== 1843: four-year-old season ===
Firebrand reappeared in 1843 in the Great Four Year Old Stakes over two and a quarter miles at Newmarket on 2 May. She faced one opponent, a gelding named Devil among the Tailors, and started favourite for the only time in her career, at odds of 1/2. She failed to end her run of defeats however, as she was beaten by a head. Later the same afternoon, Firebrand was entered in a Sweepstakes over the four-mile Beacon Course. As the other four entries had been withdrawn by her owners the filly was able to record her second career "victory" by walking over the course. She was then retired and "put to the stud".

== Stud record ==
Firebrand was retired from racing to become a broodmare for Bentinck's stud. Firebrand was covered by the stallion Venison soon after her last race, but failed to conceive. In the following year she produced a colt by Venison named Incendiary. She was sold along with the mare Yorkshire Lady for £700 to Mr. Hart who exported the horses to Berlin in October 1845. As a broodmare at the Brandenburg State Stud at Neustadt, she produced three fillies and seven colts between 1846 and 1857. Firebrand died in 1861 at the stud of the Hon. Nobbe-Pinnow.

== Pedigree ==
Pedigree of Firebrand (GB), chestnut mare, 1839
Sire Lamplighter(GB) 1823	Merlin; 1815	Castrel	Buzzard*
Sire Lamplighter(GB) 1823	Merlin; 1815	Castrel	Alexander mare*
Sire Lamplighter(GB) 1823	Merlin; 1815	Newton	Delpini
Sire Lamplighter(GB) 1823	Merlin; 1815	Newton	Tipple Cyder
Sire Lamplighter(GB) 1823	Spotless; 1809	Walton	Sir Peter Teazle
Sire Lamplighter(GB) 1823	Spotless; 1809	Walton	Arethusa
Sire Lamplighter(GB) 1823	Spotless; 1809	Trumpator mare	Trumpator
Sire Lamplighter(GB) 1823	Spotless; 1809	Trumpator mare	Highflyer mare (1793)
Dam Rubens mare (GB) 1819	Rubens; 1805	Buzzard*	Woopecker
Dam Rubens mare (GB) 1819	Rubens; 1805	Buzzard*	Misfortune
Dam Rubens mare (GB) 1819	Rubens; 1805	Alexander mare*	Alexander
Dam Rubens mare (GB) 1819	Rubens; 1805	Alexander mare*	Highflyer mare (1780)
Dam Rubens mare (GB) 1819	Tippitywitchet; 1808	Waxy	Potoooooooo
Dam Rubens mare (GB) 1819	Tippitywitchet; 1808	Waxy	Maria
Dam Rubens mare (GB) 1819	Tippitywitchet; 1808	Hare	Sweetbriar
Dam Rubens mare (GB) 1819	Tippitywitchet; 1808	Hare	Justice mare (Family:27)
