= Phosphorus (horse) =

British-bred Thoroughbred racehorse

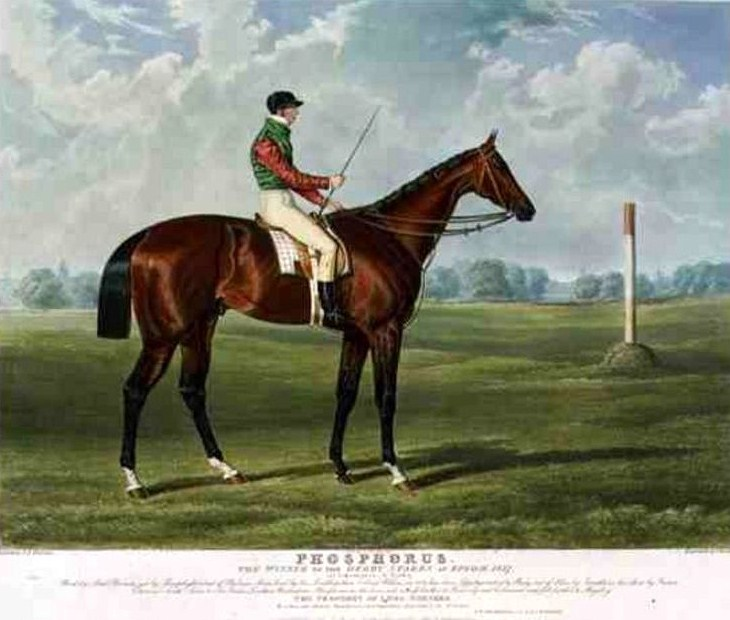
- Phosphorus. Painting by John Frederick Herring, Sr.
- Sire: Lamplighter
- Grandsire: Merlin
- Dam: Rubens mare
- Damsire: Rubens
- Sex: Stallion
- Foaled: 1834
- Country: United Kingdom of Great Britain and Ireland
- Colour: Bay
- Breeder: Robert Wilson, 9th Baron Berners
- Owner: Robert Wilson, 9th Baron Berners
- Trainer: John Doe
- Record: 3:2-1-0 (in England)

Major wins
- Epsom Derby (1837)

Phosphorus (1834 – after 1843) was a British Thoroughbred racehorse and sire. In his British career he ran three times and won two races. His most significant win came when he overcame a leg injury to win the 1837 Epsom Derby. Phosphorus was later sold and exported to Brunswick, but was unable to reproduce his English form. He was unsuccessful as a stallion.

== Background ==
Phosphorus, a bay horse with three white feet. Phosphorus' dam, the Rubens mare, an unnamed daughter of Rubens, had already produced one winner of the 1000 Guineas in May-day (1834) and went on to produce another one in Firebrand (1842). She was also the dam of the outstanding racemare Camarine. Phosphorus was a lightly built, unprepossessing horse; viewing him immediately after his win at Epsom, the Farmer's Magazine praised his trainer for the colt's excellent condition, but could find little to compliment in his appearance. The Sporting Magazine was even less flattering, describing Phosphorus as a "weak-looking little cripple".

== Racing career ==
=== 1837: three-year-old season ===
Phosphorus was unraced as a two-year-old and made his first racecourse appearance at Newmarket in April. Ridden by John Day, he finished second in the Newmarket Stakes, beaten by a length by Rat-trap. Day was also the jockey when Phosphorus returned to Newmarket in May against ten opponents in the Rowley Mile Plate. He started at odds of 5/2 and won easily by two lengths from an unnamed colt by Mulatto. Phosphorus was reported to be "in physic" at the time of this race, meaning that he was running under some kind of medication.

Phosphorus was moved to a base at Epsom to complete his preparation for the Derby, but on his first gallop after arriving he sprained a foreleg. He was lame and confined to his box for four days, after which the soreness appeared to have faded although some swelling remained. By this time, however, Day had heard of the colt's problems and rejected him in favour of a colt named Wisdom as his ride in the race. On the morning of the Derby Phosphorus was walked for four hours and, having returned sound, was cleared by his owner to run, with the ride going to George Edwards. News of Phosphorus' problems led to his price for the Derby drifting, despite the fact that he had been "tipped" as a possible winner in a poem published in Bell's Life magazine which ended:

"Tis over, the trick for the thousands is done,
George Edwards on Phosphorus the Derby has won!"

On 25 May Phosphorus started at odds of 40/1 in a field of seventeen runners for the Derby, with Rat-trap being made the 6/4 favourite. The 1837 race was the first to be started by flag and the last to be held on a Thursday: the Derby was almost always run on a Wednesday for the next 150 years. After a delay as the police cleared some of the 100,000 spectators from the course and several false starts, the race got under way with a colt named Pocket Hercules taking the lead, and Phosphorus racing in third. The pace was exceptionally fast and most of the runners were struggling well before the turn into the straight, by which point Phosphorus and the second favourite Caravan had moved up to dispute the lead. The two colts pulled clear of the rest of the runners and raced side-by-side throughout the closing stages in a "magnificent" contest. Inside the final furlong the outsider, under a strong ride from Edwards, gained the advantage and won by a margin variously reported as a head, a neck or half a length from Caravan, with the pair six lengths clear of the field.

Phosphorus aggravated his injury in winning the Derby and was reported to be "dead lame" after the race. He did not run again that year and there were doubts that he could ever be returned to racing condition.

=== 1838: four-year-old season ===
Phosphorus was kept in training as a four-year-old, but the death of Lord Berners on 28 March rendered all of his remaining race entries void under the rules of racing at the time. At Newmarket in April, the Derby winner was put up for auction and sold for 910 guineas. Later that year, Phosphorus was sold privately for 1,000 guineas to the Duke of Brunswick and exported to Germany. He is known to have raced several times in Germany without success, but details of his later career are sketchy. He is reported to have been beaten "very easy" by a mare called My Lady in a race in Brunswick.

== Stud career ==
Following his retirement, Phosphorus stood as a stallion in Germany. He appears to have made no impact at stud.

== Pedigree ==
Pedigree of Phosphorus (GB), bay stallion, 1834
Sire Lamplighter(GB) 1823	Merlin; 1815	Castrel	Buzzard*
Sire Lamplighter(GB) 1823	Merlin; 1815	Castrel	Alexander mare*
Sire Lamplighter(GB) 1823	Merlin; 1815	Newton	Delpini
Sire Lamplighter(GB) 1823	Merlin; 1815	Newton	Tipple Cyder
Sire Lamplighter(GB) 1823	Spotless; 1809	Walton	Sir Peter Teazle
Sire Lamplighter(GB) 1823	Spotless; 1809	Walton	Arethusa
Sire Lamplighter(GB) 1823	Spotless; 1809	Trumpator mare	Trumpator
Sire Lamplighter(GB) 1823	Spotless; 1809	Trumpator mare	Highflyer mare (1793)
Dam Rubens mare (GB) 1819	Rubens; 1805	Buzzard*	Woodpecker
Dam Rubens mare (GB) 1819	Rubens; 1805	Buzzard*	Misfortune
Dam Rubens mare (GB) 1819	Rubens; 1805	Alexander mare*	Alexander
Dam Rubens mare (GB) 1819	Rubens; 1805	Alexander mare*	Highflyer mare (1780)
Dam Rubens mare (GB) 1819	Tippitywitchet; 1808	Waxy	Potoooooooo
Dam Rubens mare (GB) 1819	Tippitywitchet; 1808	Waxy	Maria
Dam Rubens mare (GB) 1819	Tippitywitchet; 1808	Hare	Sweetbriar
Dam Rubens mare (GB) 1819	Tippitywitchet; 1808	Hare	Justice mare (Family:27)

* Phosphorus is inbred 4S x 3D to the stallion Buzzard, meaning that he appears fourth generation on the sire side of his pedigree and third generation on the dam side of his pedigree.

* Phosphorus is inbred 4S x 3D to the mare Alexander mare, meaning that she appears fourth generation on the sire side of his pedigree and third generation on the dam side of his pedigree.
