= Ypäjä =

- Municipality
- Ypäjän kunta Ypäjä kommun
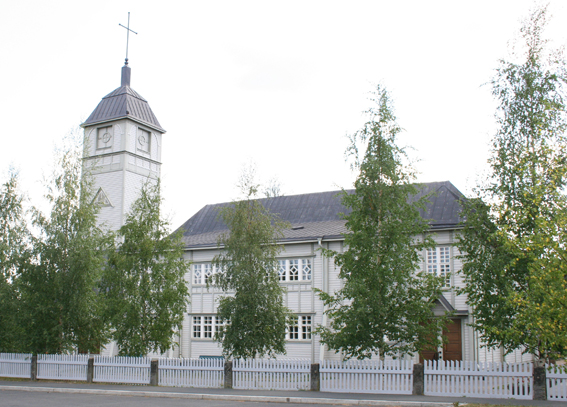
- Ypäjä Church

- Coat of arms

- Location of Ypäjä in Finland
- Interactive map of Ypäjä
- Coordinates: 60°48.5′N 023°17′E
- Country: Finland
- Region: Kanta-Häme
- Sub-region: Forssa
- Charter: 1876

Government
  - Municipal manager: Tatu Ujula

Area (2018-01-01)
  - Total: 183.25 km^{2} (70.75 sq mi)
  - Land: 182.76 km^{2} (70.56 sq mi)
  - Water: 0.5 km^{2} (0.19 sq mi)
  - Rank: 269th largest in Finland

Population (2025-12-31)
  - Total: 2,186
  - Rank: 248th largest in Finland
  - Density: 11.96/km^{2} (31.0/sq mi)

Population by native language
  - Finnish: 97.4% (official)
  - Others: 2.6%

Population by age
  - 0 to 14: 12.4%
  - 15 to 64: 58.4%
  - 65 or older: 29.1%
- Time zone: UTC+02:00 (EET)
  - Summer (DST): UTC+03:00 (EEST)
- Climate: Dfc
- Website: ypaja.fi

Ypäjä (Finnish pronunciation: [ˈypæjæ]) is a municipality located in the countryside of south-western Finland. It belongs to the region of Kanta-Häme. The municipality has a population of 2,186 (31 December 2025) and covers an area of 183.25 square kilometres (70.75 sq mi) of which 0.5 km^{2} (0.19 sq mi) is water. The population density is 11.96 inhabitants per square kilometre (31.0/sq mi). The municipality is unilingually Finnish.

The main population centre of Ypäjä is a small village situated on the river Loimijoki, between the towns of Forssa (23 km to the east from Ypäjä) and Loimaa (15 km to the west). Although officially part of the Forssa region, Ypäjä is often also considered to belong to the Loimaa region as it has traditionally been influenced by both towns. Besides Loimaa, its direct neighbours are Jokioinen, Humppila, Somero and Koski Tl.

The distances from Ypäjä to the three major cities in southern Finland are relatively short: 74 kilometres (46 mi) to Turku, 96 km (60 mi) to Tampere, and 132 km (82 mi) to the capital Helsinki.

Ypäjä is probably best known for horses; the municipality e.g. has an Equine College and hosts an annual international riding competition called Finnderby. The most famous horse that lived in Ypäjä was Käthy (1934–1953), who was known as Marshal C. G. E. Mannerheim's last horse.

Ypäjä's coat of arms is designed by Aukusti Tuhka.
