= Coronation (British horse) =

British-bred Thoroughbred racehorse

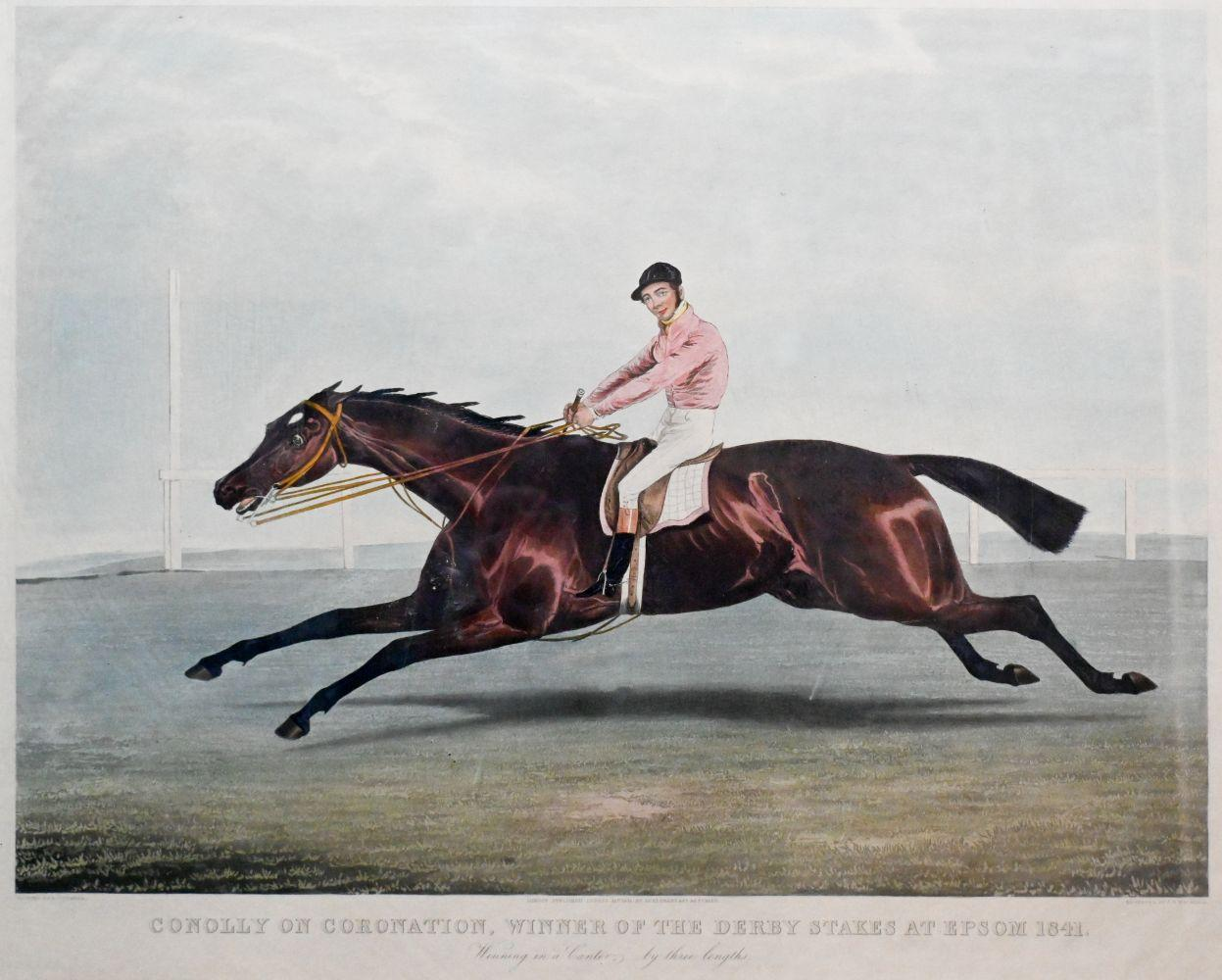
- Coronation and Conolly. 1841 aquatint by Francis Calcraft Turner.
- Sire: Sir Hercules
- Grandsire: Whalebone
- Dam: Ruby
- Damsire: Rubens
- Sex: Stallion
- Foaled: 1838
- Country: United Kingdom of Great Britain and Ireland
- Colour: Bay
- Breeder: Abraham Rawlinson
- Owner: Abraham Rawlinson
- Trainer: Ben Painter; Isaac Day
- Record: 7:6–1–0

Major wins
- Epsom Derby (1841); Ascot Derby (1841)

Coronation (foaled 1838) was a British Thoroughbred racehorse and sire. In a career that lasted from August 1840 to September 1841 he ran seven races. He began his career with a run of six successive victories including the 1841 Epsom Derby. He was retired after being narrowly defeated in the St. Leger Stakes at Doncaster. Coronation later had moderate success as a stallion before he was exported to Russia.

== Background ==
Coronation, a "blood" bay horse standing 16 hands high, was bred by his owner, Abraham Tysack Rawlinson of Chadlington in Oxfordshire, father of Sir Henry Rawlinson, 1st Baronet and George Rawlinson. The Farmer's Magazine described him as a "splendid looking animal" with a strong, tapering head, muscular shoulders and long legs. Coronation was prepared for racing "with considerable ability" by Ben Painter (or Painten), Rawlinson's "stud groom" at Chadlington and Heythrop Park. He was foaled in the year of Queen Victoria's coronation.

Coronation's sire, Sir Hercules, was an Irish-bred racehorse who ran third in the St Leger of 1829. He went on to become a highly successful and influential stallion. He sired many important winners including Faugh-a-Ballagh (St Leger), The Corsair (2000 Guineas) and Birdcatcher, the male-line ancestor of most modern thoroughbreds.

== Racing career ==
=== 1840: two-year-old season ===
Coronation ran twice as a two-year-old in the summer of 1840. On his first appearance on 18 August he easily won a four-runner Sweepstakes for two- and three-year-old at Oxford Racecourse from a filly named Pelerine. He followed up by beating two opponents in a Sweepstakes at Warwick, winning by a neck from St Cloud, at odds of 1/4. After the race he was described as "the finest two-year-old" of the season and bookmakers offered him at odds of 18/1 for the following year's Derby.

=== 1841: three-year-old season ===
On his three-year-old debut, Coronation won the Trial Stakes Warwick in impressive style in a large, but undistinguished field. On 15 April, Coronation's odds for the Derby were cut from 10/1to 9/1. In the final build-up to the Derby, Rawlinson entrusted the horse to a professional trainer, Isaac Day, who was based at Northleach, Gloucestershire.

At Epsom on 26 May, Coronation started 5/2 favourite for the Derby, having been backed down from 4/1 in the hours before the race, in a record field of twenty-nine runners. He was ridden by Patrick Conolly (or Connolly), a jockey who had won the 1834 Derby on Plenipotentiary. The weather was warm and sunny and the customary huge crowd – described by the Sunday Times as an "immense mob" combining every "rank, wealth, talent and beauty in the country" – was in attendance. There was no Royal presence, but the nobility were represented by four Dukes, four Marquises and seven Earls. After a long delay caused by six or seven false starts the race got under way and Conolly positioned Coronation just behind the leaders. The favourite was always traveling easily, and when the leading horses began to tire in the straight, Conolly sent him to the front. Coronation quickly went clear and was never challenged, winning easily by three lengths from Van Amburgh. Following the race, the winner was surrounded by celebrating crowds and panicked, kicking out and killing one spectator. In addition to the prize money of £4,275, Rawlinson took an estimated £8,000 in winning bets.

At Royal Ascot on 8 June, in front of a crowd including the Queen Victoria, Coronation walked over in the Ascot Derby (a race now known as the King Edward VII Stakes) when the other entrants were withdrawn. On 18 August, Coronation raced against older horses for the first time in the two and a quarter mile Oxford Cup. He won at odds of 1/5 beating Isaac, Executrix and Caravan.

Coronation's performances during the summer had been so dominant that the St Leger on 14 September was considered a formality, and attracted less interest than usual. He started the 1/2 favourite against ten opponents, of whom only the Marquess of Westminster's colt Satirist (5/1) was given any chance against him. Coronation took the lead at half way and entered the straight traveling well and looking the likely winner. But Satirist, ridden by Bill Scott, produced a strong challenge, and the two colts raced side by side throughout the last furlong. In the closing strides Satirist gained a slight advantage, and Coronation was beaten by "half a neck". According to his jockey, John Day, Coronation had been "treated like a spoiled child" in the build-up to the St Leger and went to Doncaster some way below peak fitness.

== Stud career ==
Coronation was not a great success as a stallion, but he did sire The Flea who won the 1000 Guineas in 1849. One of his daughters, British Queen, became a successful broodmare. After a few seasons at stud in England, Coronation was exported to Russia.

== Pedigree ==
Pedigree of Coronation (GB), bay stallion, 1838
Sire Sir Hercules (GB) 1826	Whalebone; 1807	Waxy	Potoooooooo
Sire Sir Hercules (GB) 1826	Whalebone; 1807	Waxy	Maria
Sire Sir Hercules (GB) 1826	Whalebone; 1807	Penelope	Trumpator
Sire Sir Hercules (GB) 1826	Whalebone; 1807	Penelope	Prunella
Sire Sir Hercules (GB) 1826	Peri; 1822	Wanderer	Gohanna
Sire Sir Hercules (GB) 1826	Peri; 1822	Wanderer	Catherine*
Sire Sir Hercules (GB) 1826	Peri; 1822	Thalestris	Alexander*
Sire Sir Hercules (GB) 1826	Peri; 1822	Thalestris	Rival*
Dam Ruby (GB) 1825	Rubens; 1805	Buzzard	Woodpecker*
Dam Ruby (GB) 1825	Rubens; 1805	Buzzard	Misfortune
Dam Ruby (GB) 1825	Rubens; 1805	Alexander mare	Alexander*
Dam Ruby (GB) 1825	Rubens; 1805	Alexander mare	Highflyer mare
Dam Ruby (GB) 1825	Williamson's Ditto mare 1812	Williamson's Ditto	Sir Peter Teazle*
Dam Ruby (GB) 1825	Williamson's Ditto mare 1812	Williamson's Ditto	Arethusa mare
Dam Ruby (GB) 1825	Williamson's Ditto mare 1812	Agnes	Shuttle
Dam Ruby (GB) 1825	Williamson's Ditto mare 1812	Agnes	sister to Hoity Toity (Family:26)

* Coronation is inbred 4S x 4D to the stallion Alexander, meaning that he appears fourth generation on the sire side of his pedigree, and fourth generation on the dam side of his pedigree.

* Coronation is inbred 5S x 4D to the stallion Woodpecker, meaning that he appears fifth generation (via Catherine) on the sire side of his pedigree, and fourth generation on the dam side of his pedigree.

* Coronation is inbred 5S x 4D to the stallion Sir Peter Teazle, meaning that he appears fifth generation (via Rival) on the sire side of his pedigree, and fourth generation on the dam side of his pedigree.
