= Pastille (horse) =

British Thoroughbred racehorse

- Sire: Rubens
- Grandsire: Buzzard
- Dam: Parasol
- Damsire: Potoooooooo
- Sex: Mare
- Foaled: 1819
- Country: United Kingdom of Great Britain and Ireland
- Colour: Bay
- Breeder: George FitzRoy, 4th Duke of Grafton
- Owner: Duke of Grafton
- Trainer: Robert Robson
- Record: 13:8-2-3

Major wins
- 2000 Guineas (1822); Oaks Stakes (1822); Post Sweepstakes (1823); Match against Premium (1824)

Pastille (foaled 1819) was a British Thoroughbred racehorse and broodmare who won two British Classic Races. In a career which lasted from April 1822 until November 1824, she won eight of her thirteen races and was placed second or third in the other five. On her second racecourse appearance in she became the first filly to win the 2000 Guineas at Newmarket and went on to win the Oaks Stakes at Epsom Downs Racecourse a month later. She won once as a four-year-old in 1823 and was unbeaten in three starts in 1824. After her retirement from racing she had some success as a broodmare.

== Background ==
Pastille was a bay mare bred by her owner George FitzRoy, 4th Duke of Grafton at his stud at Euston Hall in Suffolk. Her sire, Rubens was a successful racehorse, who at the time of Pastille's conception was covering mares at Newmarket at a fee of 25 guineas. He sired two other classic winning fillies in Landscape, who won the Oaks in 1816 and Pastille's contemporary and stable companion Whizgig. Rubens was champion sire in 1815, 1821 and 1822. Pastille's dam, Parasol was a daughter of Prunella, described as one of the most important broodmares in the history of the Thoroughbred breed, making her a half-sister to 1809 Derby winner Pope and the mares Pope Joan, Penelope and Prudence. Parasol was a top-class racemare who became a successful broodmare in her own right, producing, in addition to Pastille, the 2000 Guineas winner Pindarrie and the leading stallion Partisan. Grafton sent the filly to be trained at Newmarket by Robert Robson, the so-called "Emperor of Trainers".

== Racing career ==
=== 1822: three-year-old season ===
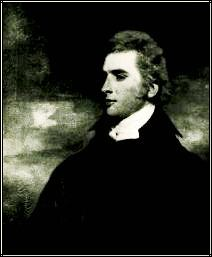
The Duke of Grafton, who bred and owned Pastille

Pastille's first race was a Sweepstakes at the Newmarket Craven meeting on 11 April. Racing over the Ditch Mile course, the filly started the 4/7 favourite and won from her only rival, Infanta. On the same afternoon the Duke of Grafton won another Sweepstakes with his filly, Whizgig. At the next Newmarket meeting, the Duke targeted the 1000 Guineas with Whizgig, leaving Pastille to race against colt's in the 2000 Guineas. The entry for the latter race was not particularly strong, and only two colts appeared to oppose Pastille over the Rowley Mile on 23 April. Ridden by Francis Buckle, Pastille started the 4/6 favourite and won "in a common canter" from Midsummer and Marmion. On the following day Whizgig won the 1000 Guineas. In the Newmarket Stakes on the last day of the meeting, Pastille faced a stronger field of colts than she had done in the 2000 Guineas. She started at odds of 6/1 and finished second of the seven runners behind Mr Batson's colt Mystic.

On Friday 24 May Grafton's two classic-winning fillies met on the racecourse in the Oaks over one and a half miles at Epsom Downs Racecourse. Buckle rode Whizgig and the 1000 Guineas winner was preferred both by her owner and in the betting, starting the 11/8 favourite ahead of Pastille on 7/2. Whizgig went to the front from the start and led from Pastille until the closing stages when she was overtaken by Mr Wilson's Rubens filly and faded to lose her unbeaten record, finishing unplaced. Pastille however was produced with a strong late run by George Edwards to win by a head at odds of 7/2, in what the Sporting Magazine described as, "as good a race as ever seen for the Oaks".

In June, Pastille was sent to Ascot Racecourse and was brought back in distance for the Tent Stakes over the New Mile course. She started favourite against three colts but finished third to Marcellus, a colt owned by the Duke of Grafton's cousin Thomas Grosvenor.

After her defeat at Ascot, Pastille did not race again until the opening day of the Newmarket "First October" meeting, which actually took place on 30 September. She started favourite for the Palace Stakes over one and three-quarter miles and finished third behind the colts Swivel and Aaron. Two weeks later at the Second October meeting, Pastille ended her season with a win as she defeated the Duke of York's filly Electress and a colt named Sharper in a subscription race over ten furlongs.

=== 1823: four-year-old season ===
Pastille began her four-year-old season at the Second Spring meeting at Newmarket in May. Running in a ten-furlong Sweepstakes she finished third to Lord Verulam's filly Venom who was carrying twelve pounds less than the Oaks winner.

After a break of five months, Pastille returned at the Second October meeting where she contested the Post Sweepstakes for three and four-year-olds over the two mile Ditch In course. Ridden by Buckle, she started the 13/8 second favourite and "won easy" from Mr Pettit's colt Ajax. On 31 October at the Houghton meeting, Pastille ran in the one and three quarter mile Audley End Stakes, the last race of the Newmarket season. She carried the top weight of 124 pounds and finished second of the eight runners a length behind Lord George Cavendish's colt Bizarre. The winner went on to take the next two runnings of the Ascot Gold Cup.

=== 1824: five-year-old season ===
As in 1823, Pastille began her season at the Second Spring meeting, where she ran two match races. In both races she was ridden by Buckle and was set to concede nine pounds to a four-year-old colt. On 17 May she ran for 100 guineas against Ganymede over the Rowley Mile. The race resulted in a dead heat and there was no run-off, suggesting that the prize money was divided. Four days later, Pastille was matched against Mr Greville's Premium over ten furlongs and defeated the colt to win a 200 guinea prize.

Pastille's last race came at the Houghton meeting on 2 November. In a ten furlong handicap race she was required to concede weight to four rivals, including that season's 2000 Guineas winner Shahriar. The mare ended her career with a victory as she won from Lord Jersey's five-year-old Aaron.

== Breeding record ==
Pastille was retired from racing to become a broodmare at the Duke of Grafton's stud. The best of her offspring was probably the colt Æther, who finished third in the 2000 Guineas in 1839. Her direct descendants included Trappist (July Cup, sire of L'Abbesse de Jouarre), Lally (Eclipse Stakes), Beaujolais (Poule d'Essai des Poulains), Ochiltree (Irish St Leger) and Embrujo (Argentinian Triple Crown).

== Pedigree ==
Pedigree of Pastille (GB), bay mare, 1819
Sire Rubens (GB) 1805	Buzzard; 1787	Woodpecker	Herod
Sire Rubens (GB) 1805	Buzzard; 1787	Woodpecker	Miss Ramsden
Sire Rubens (GB) 1805	Buzzard; 1787	Misfortune	Dux
Sire Rubens (GB) 1805	Buzzard; 1787	Misfortune	Curiosity
Sire Rubens (GB) 1805	Alexander mare 1790	Alexander	Eclipse
Sire Rubens (GB) 1805	Alexander mare 1790	Alexander	Grecian Princess
Sire Rubens (GB) 1805	Alexander mare 1790	Highflyer mare	Highflyer
Sire Rubens (GB) 1805	Alexander mare 1790	Highflyer mare	Alfred mare
Dam Parasol (GB) 1800	Potoooooooo; 1773	Eclipse	Marske
Dam Parasol (GB) 1800	Potoooooooo; 1773	Eclipse	Spilletta
Dam Parasol (GB) 1800	Potoooooooo; 1773	Sportsmistress	Sportsman
Dam Parasol (GB) 1800	Potoooooooo; 1773	Sportsmistress	Golden Locks
Dam Parasol (GB) 1800	Prunella; 1788	Highflyer	Herod
Dam Parasol (GB) 1800	Prunella; 1788	Highflyer	Rachel
Dam Parasol (GB) 1800	Prunella; 1788	Promise	Snap
Dam Parasol (GB) 1800	Prunella; 1788	Promise	Julia (Family: 1-e)

- Pastille was inbred 3 x 4 to Highflyer and Eclipse, meaning that these stallions appear in both the third and fourth generations of her pedigree. She was also inbred 4x4 to Herod.
