= Catgut (horse) =

British-bred Thoroughbred racehorse

- Sire: Comus or Juniper
- Grandsire: Sorcerer or Whiskey
- Dam: Vanity
- Damsire: Buzzard
- Sex: Mare
- Foaled: 1816
- Country: United Kingdom
- Colour: Brown
- Breeder: George FitzRoy, 4th Duke of Grafton
- Owner: Duke of Grafton
- Trainer: Robert Robson
- Record: 6:2-1-0
- Earnings: £2,625

Major wins
- 1000 Guineas (1816)

Catgut (foaled 1816) was a British Thoroughbred racehorse and broodmare who won the classic 1000 Guineas at Newmarket in 1819. The Guineas was the filly's only competitive win in six races, her other victory coming when she was allowed to walk over on her racecourse debut.

== Background ==
Catgut was a brown mare bred by her owner George FitzRoy, 4th Duke of Grafton at his stud at Euston Hall in Suffolk. Her dam, Vanity, was bred by the 4th Duke's father Augustus FitzRoy, 3rd Duke of Grafton and won twelve races before being retired to stud. In 1815 the mare was covered by two stallions, Comus and the less well-known Juniper. Comus finished third in the Derby and sired many good horses including the classic winners Grey Momus and Reveller. Juniper was a "useful" stallion, best known as the sire of Camarine and the damsire of Velocipede. Grafton sent the filly to be trained at Newmarket by Robert Robson, the so-called "Emperor of Trainers".

== Racing career ==
=== 1819: three-year-old season ===
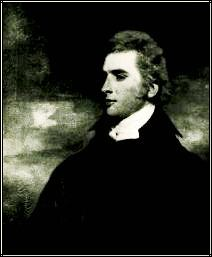
The Duke of Grafton, who bred and owned Catgut

Before the 1819 season began, Catgut had acquired a reputation as a potentially high-class performer, featuring prominently in the ante-post betting lists for the Oaks Stakes.

Catgut's first racecourse appearance came on 12 April 1819 on the opening day of the Newmarket Craven meeting. She was scheduled to compete in a Sweepstakes over the Abington Mile course but won the 600 guinea without having to race as her opponents were withdrawn by their owners. Seventeen days later, at the First Spring meeting Catgut was one of seven fillies to contest the sixth running of the 1000 Guineas Stakes, which despite its name carried a first prize of 1,900 guinea. She was not regarded as a serious contender, starting at odds of 20/1 for the race which was run over the Ditch Mile course. She upset the odds by winning from Lord George Cavendish's filly Espagnolle. the 2/5 favourite. Although most of the Duke of Grafton's major winners in this period were ridden by Frank Buckle, the name of Catgut's jockey in this race has not been recorded. Catgut had been entered in a race the following day, but was withdrawn, with her owner paying a 25 guinea forfeit. On 28 May Catgut was sent to Epsom Downs Racecourse to contest the Oaks Stakes over one and a half miles. She started at odds of 10/1 and finished unplaced behind Mr Thornhill's filly Shoveler. The Oaks was Catgut's only race away from Newmarket.

Catgut did not run again until the First October meeting, when she finished second of the three runners in a Town Plate over the two-mile "Ditch In" course, beaten by Lord Exeter's filly Dulcinea. At the Second October meeting two weeks later, Catgut was assigned a weight of 97 pounds in an Oatlands Stakes, a handicap race over the Bunbury Mile course. She was made second favourite at odds of 3/1 but finished unplaced behind the four-year-old filly Romp. Catgut's final race came on 3 November at the Houghton meeting when she was entered in a five furlong Subscription Plate. The race was for two and three-year-olds with the provision that the winner would be available for sale at a price of 350 guineas. Catgut started second favourite in a twelve runner field but finished unplaced behind Soota, a black filly owned by Mr Lake.

== Stud record ==
Catgut was retired from racing to become a broodmare at the Duke of Grafton's stud. She produced five foal by stallions including Election, Partisan and Woful before being sold to Mr S L Fox in 1829.

== Pedigree ==
The following pedigree assumes that Catgut was sired by Comus

Pedigree of Catgut (GB), brown mare, 1816
Sire Comus (GB) 1809	Sorcerer; 1796	Trumpator	Conductor
Sire Comus (GB) 1809	Sorcerer; 1796	Trumpator	Brunette
Sire Comus (GB) 1809	Sorcerer; 1796	Young Giantess	Diomed
Sire Comus (GB) 1809	Sorcerer; 1796	Young Giantess	Giantess
Sire Comus (GB) 1809	Houghton Lass; 1801	Sir Peter Teazle	Highflyer
Sire Comus (GB) 1809	Houghton Lass; 1801	Sir Peter Teazle	Papillon
Sire Comus (GB) 1809	Houghton Lass; 1801	Alexina	King Fergus
Sire Comus (GB) 1809	Houghton Lass; 1801	Alexina	Lardella
Dam Vanity (GB) 1803	Buzzard; 1787	Woodpecker	Herod
Dam Vanity (GB) 1803	Buzzard; 1787	Woodpecker	Miss Ramsden
Dam Vanity (GB) 1803	Buzzard; 1787	Misfortune	Dux
Dam Vanity (GB) 1803	Buzzard; 1787	Misfortune	Curiosity
Dam Vanity (GB) 1803	Dabchick; 1795	Potoooooooo	Eclipse
Dam Vanity (GB) 1803	Dabchick; 1795	Potoooooooo	Sportsmistress
Dam Vanity (GB) 1803	Dabchick; 1795	Drab	Highflyer
Dam Vanity (GB) 1803	Dabchick; 1795	Drab	Hebe (Family: 12)
