= Whizgig =

British-bred Thoroughbred racehorse

- Sire: Rubens
- Grandsire: Buzzard
- Dam: Penelope
- Damsire: Trumpator
- Sex: Mare
- Foaled: 1819
- Country: United Kingdom
- Colour: Chestnut
- Breeder: George FitzRoy, 4th Duke of Grafton
- Owner: Duke of Grafton
- Trainer: Robert Robson
- Record: 14:7-1-0
- Earnings: ca. £5,000

Major wins
- 1000 Guineas (1822); Oatlands Stakes (1822); Match against Ardrossan (1822); Subscription Handicap Plate (1823)

Whizgig (1819–1840) was a British Thoroughbred racehorse and broodmare who won the classic 1000 Guineas at Newmarket in 1822. In a racing career which lasted from April 1822 until May 1824 she ran fourteen times and won seven races. Unraced as a two-year-old, Whizgig won six of her seven races in 1822, her only defeat coming in the Oaks Stakes. She remained in training for a further two seasons, but was less successful, winning only one more race. She later became a successful broodmare.

== Background ==
Whizgig was a chestnut mare bred by her owner George FitzRoy, 4th Duke of Grafton at his stud at Euston Hall in Suffolk. Her sire, Rubens was a successful racehorse, who at the time of Whizgig's conception was covering mares at Newmarket at a fee of 25 guineas. He sired two other classic winning fillies in Landscape, who won the Oaks in 1816 and Whizgig's contemporary and stable companion Pastille. Rubens was champion sire in 1815, 1821 and 1822. Whizgig's dam, Penelope was a contemporary of the 1801 Derby-winning filly Eleanor, beating her several times, and was half-sister to 1809 Derby winner Pope and the mares Pope Joan, Parasol and Prudence. Penelope was a prolific and influential broodmare, producing thirteen foals between 1806 and 1823, all with names beginning with the letter W. Whizgig was her eleventh foal and her siblings included the Derby winners Whalebone, Whisker as well as Web, Woful, Wilful, Wire, Wildfire and Windfall. Penelope died in 1824. Grafton sent the filly to be trained at Newmarket by Robert Robson, the so-called "Emperor of Trainers".

== Racing career ==
=== 1822: three-year-old season ===
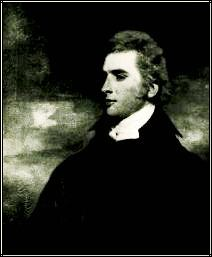
The Duke of Grafton, who bred and owned Whizgig

Whizgig began her racing career at Newmarket's Craven meeting in the spring of 1822. On 11 April, the fourth day of the meeting the filly faced two opponents in a five furlong Sweepstakes. Ridden by Francis Buckle she won at odds of 1/2 to win a prize of 800 guineas. She did not impress all observers, with the Sporting Magazine describing her as "a little idle lurching thing". On the following afternoon Whizgig ran in a Sweepstakes for fillies over the Rowley Mile course and won at odds of 3/1, beating three others very easily for a 1,200 guinea prize. Later that day Whizgig completed a hat-trick when she won another Sweepstakes to take a further 1,800 guineas. On this occasion the race was run over the Ditch Mile course and was open to both colts and fillies, and Whizgig won by a neck after "a fine race". Only three fillies appeared to oppose Whizgig in the 1000 Guineas Stakes on 25 April, including her stable companion Varnish. The Grafton fillies were combined in the betting for the race over the Ditch Mile and started at odds of 2/5. Whizgig recorded her fourth consecutive victory as she won from Rosalind with Varnish in third. A day before Whizgig's success, Grafton, Robson and Buckle had won the first classic of the season when Pastille had become the first filly to defeat the colts in the 2000 Guineas over the same course and distance.

On Friday 24 May Grafton's two classic-winning fillies met on the racecourse in the Oaks over one and a half miles at Epsom Downs Racecourse. Buckle rode Whizgig and the 1000 Guineas winner was preferred both by her owner and in the betting, starting the 11/8 favourite ahead of Pastille. Whizgig went to the front from the start and lead from Pastille until the closing stages when she was overtaken by Mr Wilson's Rubens filly and faded to lose her unbeaten record, finishing unplaced. Pastille however, was produced by a strong late run by George Edwards to win by a head at odds of 7/2, in what the Sporting Magazine described as, "as good a race as ever seen for the Oaks".

After a break of almost five months, Whizgig returned to the racecourse at the Newmarket Second October meeting. In an edition of the Oatlands Stakes, a handicap race over the Bunbury Mile course, the filly carried a weight of 99 pounds in a field which included colts and older horses. Ridden by a lightweight jockey named Boggis, she won from the five-year-old Robin Hood, with the 1821 Derby winner Gustavus among the unplaced runners. On the following day Whizgig ran a match race over ten furlongs against Lord Exeter's five-year-old Ardrossan. The filly defeated her older rival, from whom she was receiving 15 pounds, to claim the prize of 100 guineas.

=== 1823: four-year-old season ===
Whizgig began her four-year-old season on 14 April on the opening day of the Craven meeting when she ran in the Craven Stakes, an all-aged race over ten furlongs. She started 5/1 second favourite in a field of fifteen runners but finished out of the first four behind the Duke of Rutland's colt Scarborough. At the First Spring meeting two weeks later Whizgig contested a King's Plate for fillies and mares over the three and a half mile Round Course and finished second of the six runners behind the six-year-old Luss.

As in 1822, Whizgig was off the course for the summer months and returned for the Second October meeting. Her attempt to win a second Oatlands Stakes ended in failure as she finished unplaced carrying a weight of 121 pounds in a race won by a three-year-old colt named Ganymede. On her final start of the year, Whizgig ran in a Subscription Handicap Plate at the Houghton meeting. She was ridden by Buckle and carried 112 pounds against seven opponents over the two-mile "Ditch In" course. The race resulted in a dead heat between Whizgig and an unnamed roan colt owned by Colonel Wilson and ridden by Buckle's son Frank Jr. Whizgig beat the colt in a deciding heat to record her first win in over a year.

=== 1824: five-year-old season ===
Although she was covered by the stallion Orville in early 1824 Whizgig remained in training as a five-year-old but did not reproduce her best form. On her seasonal debut she finished unplaced in the Craven Stakes on 19 April. She was made second favourite for the King's Plate for fillies and mares at the First Spring meeting but was unplaced behind the 1821 Oaks winner Augusta. After failing to reach the first three places in a handicap race at the Second Spring meeting, Whizgig was retired from racing and sent to stud.

== Stud record ==
Whizgig was retired from racing to become a broodmare at the Duke of Grafton's stud and produced nine foals between 1825 and 1839 with names that began with the letter "O". Her union with Orville produced a colt foal named Omen in 1825 and two years later she produced a colt named Orbit, sire by Centaur. Neither colt made any impact on the racecourse, but Whizgig established her reputation as a broodmare with her third foal, a bay filly by Emilius foaled in 1828. Named Oxygen she won the Oaks for the Duke of Grafton in 1831 before becoming a successful broodmare. Her descendants included the Prix du Jockey Club winners Saint Germain and Jouvence. Whizgig died in 1840.

== Pedigree ==
Pedigree of Whizgig (GB), chestnut mare, 1819
| Sire Rubens (GB) 1805 | Buzzard; 1787 | Woodpecker | Herod |
| Sire Rubens (GB) 1805 | Buzzard; 1787 | Woodpecker | Miss Ramsden |
| Sire Rubens (GB) 1805 | Buzzard; 1787 | Misfortune | Dux |
| Sire Rubens (GB) 1805 | Buzzard; 1787 | Misfortune | Curiosity |
| Sire Rubens (GB) 1805 | Alexander mare 1790 | Alexander | Eclipse |
| Sire Rubens (GB) 1805 | Alexander mare 1790 | Alexander | Grecian Princess |
| Sire Rubens (GB) 1805 | Alexander mare 1790 | Highflyer mare | Highflyer |
| Sire Rubens (GB) 1805 | Alexander mare 1790 | Highflyer mare | Alfred mare |
| Dam Penelope (GB) 1798 | Trumpator; 1782 | Conductor | Matchem |
| Dam Penelope (GB) 1798 | Trumpator; 1782 | Conductor | Snap mare |
| Dam Penelope (GB) 1798 | Trumpator; 1782 | Brunette | Squirrel |
| Dam Penelope (GB) 1798 | Trumpator; 1782 | Brunette | Dove |
| Dam Penelope (GB) 1798 | Prunella; 1788 | Highflyer | Herod |
| Dam Penelope (GB) 1798 | Prunella; 1788 | Highflyer | Rachel |
| Dam Penelope (GB) 1798 | Prunella; 1788 | Promise | Snap |
| Dam Penelope (GB) 1798 | Prunella; 1788 | Promise | Julia (Family: 1-o) |

- Whizgig was inbred 3 x 4 to Highflyer, meaning that this stallion appears in both the third and fourth generations of her pedigree. She was also inbred 4x4 to Herod.
