= Käthy (horse) =

Marshal Mannerheim's final horse (1934–1953)

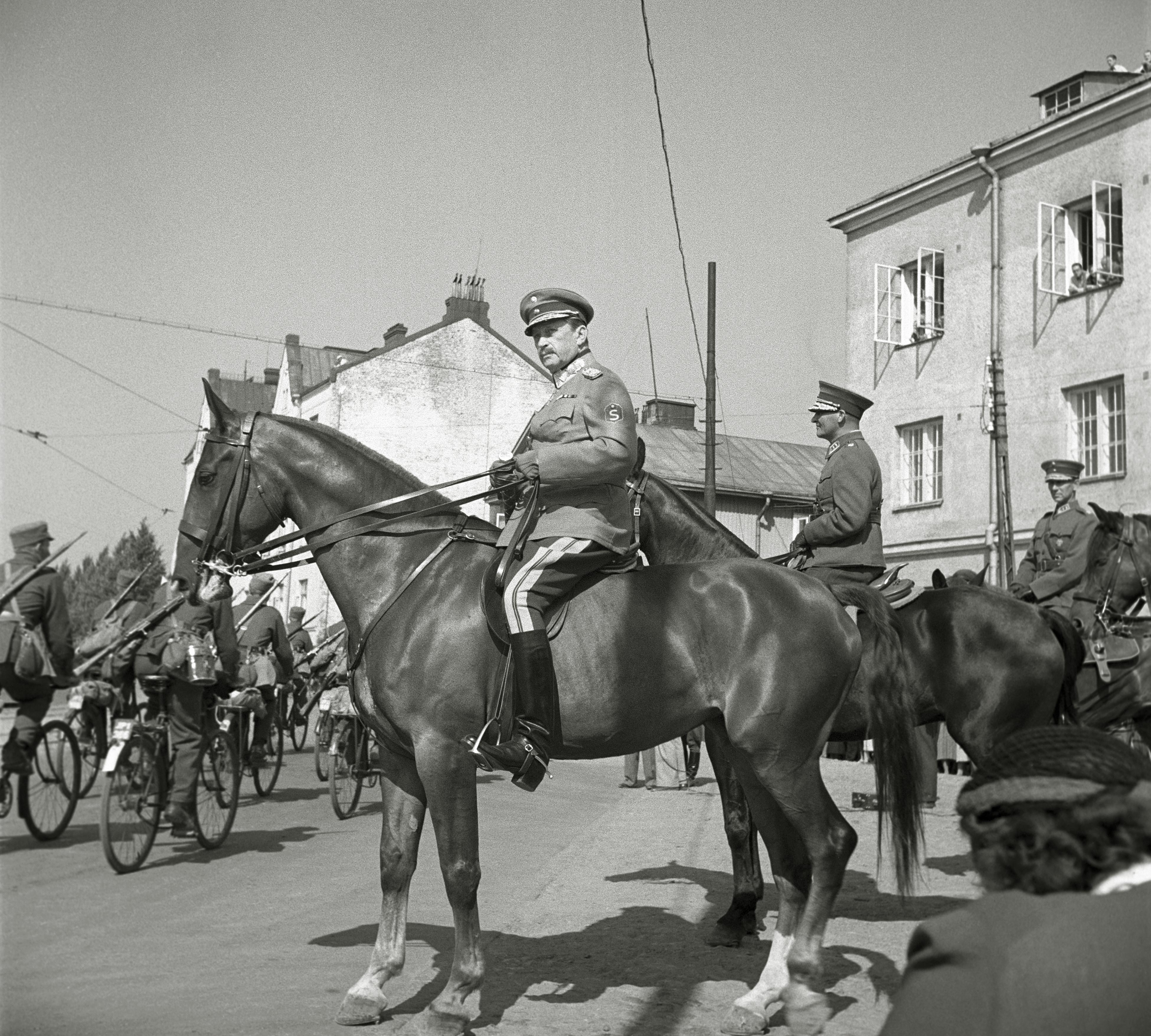
Marshal C. G. E. Mannerheim and Käthy in Vyborg in 1939

Käthy (Finnish pronunciation: [ˈkæthy]; 1934 – 24 February 1953) was the last horse used by Marshal C. G. E. Mannerheim. Born in Sweden in 1934, the 1.71 metres (5 ft 7 in) tall mare, also known as Kate, is perhaps Finland's most famous horse of all time.

The Marshal had expressed the wish that his last horse, Käthy, would attend his funeral. Käthy, who was in her final stages of pregnancy, rode part of the funeral procession on February 4, 1951, dressed in a black mourning blanket that covered the entire horse, which had been borrowed from the Swedish court for the occasion.

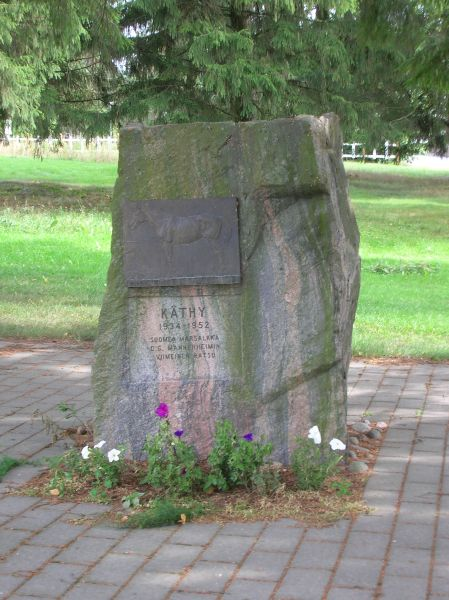
Käthy's memorial stone in Ypäjä

Käthy spent her last years of life in the Ypäjä's stables of the Finnish Defence Forces. Käthy was shot dead in February 1953 on the orders of Chief Veterinary Officer E. Estola. In retrospect, the decision to euthanize Käthy has been criticized because the mare had been healthy.

== See also ==
- Equestrian statue of Marshal Mannerheim
- List of historical horses

== Sources ==
=== Further reading ===
- Haimi, Kari; Jansson, Helena (1997). Siittolanmäki 60 vuotta (in Finnish). MTT:n hevostutkimus ja Hevosopisto Oy. ISBN 952-90-8958-9.
- Taajamaa, Tauno (1996). Lempeäkatseinen Legenda (in Finnish). Recallmed Oy. ISBN 951-9221-80-8.
