= Landscape (horse) =

British-bred Thoroughbred racehorse

- Sire: Rubens
- Grandsire: Buzzard
- Dam: Housemaid (Iris)
- Damsire: Brush
- Sex: Mare
- Foaled: 1813
- Country: United Kingdom of Great Britain and Ireland
- Colour: Bay
- Breeder: John Leveson Gower
- Owner: John Leveson Gower
- Record: 4: 2-1-0
- Earnings: £2,126

Major wins
- Oaks Stakes (1816)

Landscape (1813–1834) was a British Thoroughbred racehorse and broodmare that won the classic Oaks Stakes at Epsom Downs Racecourse in 1816. The filly's entire racing career consisted of one run in 1815 followed by three races in the space of thirteen days in June 1816. After winning the Oaks on her second racecourse appearance, she finished first and second in races at Ascot. Already pregnant at the time of her classic success, Landscape was retired from racing after Ascot and produced her first foal in the following spring.

== Background ==
Landscape was a bay mare bred by her owner General John Leveson Gower. The general had won the Oaks with Maid of Orleans in 1809. Her sire, Rubens was a successful racehorse, who at the time of Landscape's conception was covering mares at Wheeler's Farm near Wokingham in Berkshire at a fee of 15 guineas. He sired two other classic winning fillies in Pastille, who won the 2000 Guineas and Oaks in 1816 and Whizgig, who won the 1000 Guineas in the same year. Rubens was champion sire in 1815, 1821 and 1822. Landscape's dam Housemaid (also known as Iris) produced several other good winners including Raphael, who finished second to Whisker in the 1815 Epsom Derby and Rainbow, who became a successful stallion in France.

== Racing career ==
=== 1815: two-year-old season ===
Until 1913 there was no requirement for British racehorses to have official names (two-year-olds were allowed to race unnamed until 1946). On her only run as a two-year-old, "Gen. L. Gower's b. f. sister to Raphael" ran in the July Stakes at Newmarket Racecourse on 10 July. She was not among the favourites and finished unplaced behind the Duke of Rutland's filly Belvoirina.

=== 1816: three-year-old season ===
The General's filly had been officially named Landscape when she made her three-year-old debut in the Oaks Stakes over one and a half miles at Epsom on 1 June. The race attracted eleven runners from an original entry of forty-eight, and despite her lack of previous experience, General Gower's filly was made 2/1 favourite. The next horses in the betting were Duenna, Guendolen and Rhoda, the fillies who had finished second, third and first respectively in the 1000 Guineas at Newmarket a month earlier. Ridden by Sam Chifney, Jr., Landscape won the 1425 Guinea prize from Duenna, with Mr Walker's unnamed filly taking third place.

Landscape's two remaining races came at Ascot Racecourse less than two weeks later. On 11 June she was entered in a 600 guinea sweepstakes over the New Mile Course in which she started odds on favourite and won from Ginger Sal, the only horse who appeared to oppose her. Two days later she contested another sweepstakes over the same course and distance in which, as the winner of the Oaks, she was required to carry a seven pound weight penalty. She started favourite but finished second of the four runners behind Duenna.

General Gower died later that year and Landscape was sold to Lord Lowther.

== Stud record ==
Landscape had been covered by the stallion Woful as a three-year-old and was retired from racing to become a broodmare at the end of the year. In the following spring she produced her first foal, a filly named Perspective (later known as Katherina). She produced a further fourteen foals for a variety of owners before her death in 1834. Katherina became a successful broodmare, being the dam of Rowton who won the St Leger Stakes in 1829 and later became a successful sire in Virginia.

== Pedigree ==
Pedigree of Landscape (GB), bay mare, 1813
Sire Rubens (GB) 1805	Buzzard; 1787	Woodpecker	Herod
Sire Rubens (GB) 1805	Buzzard; 1787	Woodpecker	Miss Ramsden
Sire Rubens (GB) 1805	Buzzard; 1787	Misfortune	Dux
Sire Rubens (GB) 1805	Buzzard; 1787	Misfortune	Curiosity
Sire Rubens (GB) 1805	Alexander mare 1790	Alexander	Eclipse
Sire Rubens (GB) 1805	Alexander mare 1790	Alexander	Grecian Princess
Sire Rubens (GB) 1805	Alexander mare 1790	Highflyer mare	Highflyer
Sire Rubens (GB) 1805	Alexander mare 1790	Highflyer mare	Alfred mare
Dam Housemaid (Iris)(GB) 1795	Brush; 1785	Eclipse	Marske
Dam Housemaid (Iris)(GB) 1795	Brush; 1785	Eclipse	Spilletta
Dam Housemaid (Iris)(GB) 1795	Brush; 1785	Bosphorus mare	Bosphorus
Dam Housemaid (Iris)(GB) 1795	Brush; 1785	Bosphorus mare	Forester mare
Dam Housemaid (Iris)(GB) 1795	Herod mare	Herod	Tartar
Dam Housemaid (Iris)(GB) 1795	Herod mare	Herod	Cypron
Dam Housemaid (Iris)(GB) 1795	Herod mare	Goldfinder mare	Goldfinder
Dam Housemaid (Iris)(GB) 1795	Herod mare	Goldfinder mare	sister to Greying (Family: 29)
