= Rubens (horse) =

British-bred Thoroughbred racehorse

- Sire: Buzzard
- Grandsire: Woodpecker
- Dam: Alexander mare
- Damsire: Alexander
- Sex: Stallion
- Foaled: 1805
- Country: Great Britain
- Colour: Chestnut
- Breeder: Prince of Wales
- Owner: Prince of Wales; 3rd Earl of Darlington; Gen. Leveson Gower
- Record: 6: 3-1-1

Major wins
- Pavilion Stakes (1808); Sweepstakes of 100 gs at Newmarket (1809); Craven Stakes (1810)

Awards
- Leading sire in Great Britain and Ireland (1815, 1821, 1822)

Rubens (1805 – February 1829) was a British Thoroughbred racehorse. During his career he won three races, including the Craven Stakes in 1810. After retiring from racing he became a successful stallion and was the leading sire in Great Britain and Ireland in 1815, 1821 and 1822. His progeny included Landscape, Pastille, Whizgig and the Rubens mare.

== Background ==
Rubens was a chestnut colt bred by the Prince of Wales and foaled in 1805. His dam was the bay Alexander mare who also foaled Castrel, Craven Stakes winner Selim and Epsom Oaks winner Bronze. All three of these foals were full-siblings to Rubens. Their sire was dual Craven Stakes winner Buzzard. As well as these siblings, Buzzard also sired St. Leger Stakes winner Quiz.

== Racing career ==
=== 1808: Three-year-old season ===
On 2 June 1808 at Epsom Downs and racing for the Prince of Wales, Rubens started as the 10/3 second favourite for the Derby where he face nine rivals. The race was won by 25/1 outsider Pan, who beat the favourite Vandyke. Chester finished in third place, with Rubens in fourth. Rubens was then purchased by 3rd Earl of Darlington and at Brighton in August he was one of four horses who contested the Pavilion Stakes. Derby runner-up Vandyke was the 5/6 favourite, with Rubens second favourite at 3/1. Rubens won the race from Vandyke. He was also intended to run in four match races during the season, but his opponents in each of these paid a forfeit and the races never took place. The forfeits were from Bradbury, a colt by Gohanna, Dreadnought and Jock.

=== 1809: Four-year-old season ===
In April 1809 at the Newmarket First Spring meeting he won a Sweepstakes of 100 guineas each over one mile, after starting as the 4/7 favourite. Chester was second and Zoroaster finished in third place of the five runners. The following month he lost to Vandyke in a 200 guineas match race at Newmarket. In October he was intended to race against Oaks winner Morel at Newmarket, but Darlington paid a forfeit. Three days later he also paid a forfeit to Currycomb.

=== 1810: Five-year-old season ===
On 23 April 1810 he beat odds on favourite Plover to win the Craven Stakes at Newmarket. A colt by Dick Andrews finished last of the three runners. Runens' final race was in a Handicap Sweepstakes of 200 guineas each at Newmarket in May. He finished the race in third, behind winner Spaniard and runner-up Cecilia. Rubens was then sold to General Leveson Gower and retired to stud.

== Stud career ==
Rubens was a stallion at Wokingham in Berkshire, where in 1811, he stood for an initial fee of twelve guineas and one guineas for the groom. In 1818 he moved to Newmarket and his fee was 25 guineas. He stood in or around Newmarket for a number of years, but in between he stood at Eaton Stud near Chester in 1820.

He was a successful stallion and was the Leading sire in Great Britain and Ireland in 1815, 1821 and 1822. His progeny included Epsom Oaks winners Landscape and Pastille and 1000 Guineas winner Whizgig. He was also the damsire of Epsom Derby winners Coronation, Dangerous and Phosphorus. His unnamed daughter, the 1819 Rubens mare, was the dam of Phosphorus and two other classic winners. Rubens died in February 1829.

== Sire line tree ==
- Rubens
  - Raphael
  - Bobadil
  - Gainsborough
  - Sovereign
  - Strephon
  - Doctor Eady
  - Tandem
  - Taniers
  - Peter Lely
    - Poussin
  - Titian
  - Holbein
  - Wiseacre
  - Roderick
  - Sir Edward Codrington

== Pedigree ==
Pedigree of Rubens, chestnut stallion, 1805
Sire Buzzard (GB) 1787	Woodpecker (GB); 1773	Herod*; 1758	Tartar
Sire Buzzard (GB) 1787	Woodpecker (GB); 1773	Herod*; 1758	Cypron
Sire Buzzard (GB) 1787	Woodpecker (GB); 1773	Miss Ramsden	Cade
Sire Buzzard (GB) 1787	Woodpecker (GB); 1773	Miss Ramsden	Sister to Fair Star
Sire Buzzard (GB) 1787	Misfortune (GB); 1775	Dux; 1769	Matchem
Sire Buzzard (GB) 1787	Misfortune (GB); 1775	Dux; 1769	Duchess
Sire Buzzard (GB) 1787	Misfortune (GB); 1775	Curiosity; 1760	Snap
Sire Buzzard (GB) 1787	Misfortune (GB); 1775	Curiosity; 1760	Sister to Miss Belsea
Dam Alexander mare (GB)	Alexander (GB); 1782	Eclipse; 1764	Marske
Dam Alexander mare (GB)	Alexander (GB); 1782	Eclipse; 1764	Spilletta
Dam Alexander mare (GB)	Alexander (GB); 1782	Grecian Princess; 1770	Williams's Forester
Dam Alexander mare (GB)	Alexander (GB); 1782	Grecian Princess; 1770	Coalition colt mare
Dam Alexander mare (GB)	Highflyer mare (GB); 1780	Highflyer; 1774	Herod*
Dam Alexander mare (GB)	Highflyer mare (GB); 1780	Highflyer; 1774	Rachel
Dam Alexander mare (GB)	Highflyer mare (GB); 1780	Alfred mare 1775	Alfred
Dam Alexander mare (GB)	Highflyer mare (GB); 1780	Alfred mare 1775	Engineer mare

* Rubens is inbred 3S x 4D to the stallion Herod, meaning that he appears third generation on the sire side of his pedigree and fourth generation on the dam side of his pedigree.
