= Frank Buckle =

British jockey (1766–1832)

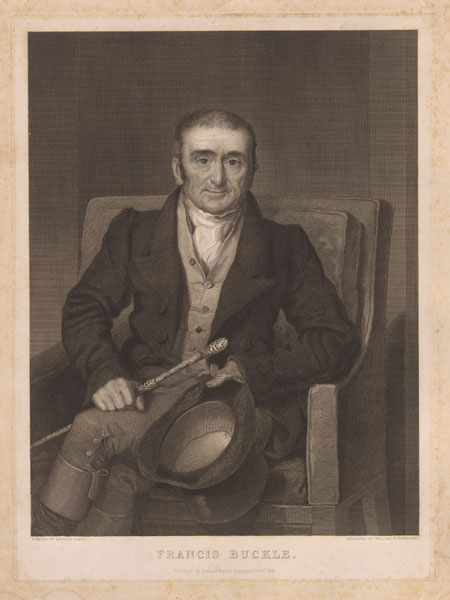
- Francis Buckle, 1831 engraving by William Camden Edwards

Personal information
- Born: 1766 Newmarket, Suffolk, England
- Died: 1832 (aged 65–66) Peterborough, Cambridgeshire, England
- Occupation: Jockey

Horse racing career
- Sport: Horse racing

Major racing wins
- British Classic Race wins: 1,000 Guineas (1818, 1820, 1821, 1822, 1823, 1827); 2,000 Guineas (1810, 1820, 1821, 1822, 1827); Epsom Derby (1792, 1794, 1802, 1811, 1823); Epsom Oaks (1797, 1798, 1799, 1802, 1803, 1805, 1817, 1818, 1823); St Leger (1800, 1804)

Significant horses
- Arab, Bellina, Bellissima, Champion, Corinne, Daedalus, Emilius, Hephestion, John Bull, Meteora, Neva, Nike, Pastille, Phantom, Pindarrie, Reginald, Rowena, Sancho, Scotia, Theophania, Turcoman, Tyrant, Whizgig, Zeal, Zinc

Francis Buckle (1766–1832), known to the British horse racing public as "The Governor", was an English jockey, who has been described as "the jockey non-pareil" of the opening quarter of the 19th century, and the man who "brought respectability to race-riding". He won at least 27 British Classic Races during his career, a record which would not be beaten for over 150 years.

== Early life ==
Buckle was born to a saddler in Newmarket, one of six children, and baptised on 18 July 1766. His parents died when he was 12, and he was brought up by an aunt and uncle. His uncle had him apprenticed to a saddler, but he absconded and refused to return, saying that "nothing on earth would he follow but the horses and stables." He started racing at the stables of Richard Vernon, making his first appearance on 17 May 1783 at the age of 16. He rode a bay colt called Wolf, and weighed in at only 3st 13 lbs (25 kg). His mentor was Sam Chifney, from who he learnt his customary riding style - holding his horse up for a late run. He was well-regarded from that first ride onwards, his master reflecting that "that boy has a head".

== Classic wins ==
His first win in one of the English Classics came in 1792, riding Lord Grosvenor's colt John Bull, who he thought was the best horse he ever rode. Grosvenor would provide Buckle with three more Classic winners - Daedalus in the 1794 Derby, Nike in the 1797 Oaks and Bellina in the 1799 Oaks.

After Grosvenor's death, Buckle formed a profitable partnership with the leading trainer of the time, Robert Robson. With Robson, and his main owners the 3rd and 4th Dukes of Grafton, Buckle won at least another eleven Classics, the unnamed jockey who rode the 1819 and 1825 1,000 Guineas winners also being assumed to be Buckle. In 1800, he won both the St. Leger Stakes and The Derby on Champion. In his career, Buckle rode 27 Classic wins, including 5 Derby winners, 9 Epsom Oaks and 2 St Legers. Besides Lord Grosvenor and the Dukes of Grafton, Buckle also rode for Sir Charles Bunbury and Colonel Mellish.

One of his most famous victories came at the 1799 Craven meeting at Newmarket. Buckle on Hambletonian met Diamond, ridden by Dennis Fitzpatrick, in a 4-mile 1 1/2-furlong match race. The amount bet on the race was without precedent, estimated at 250,000 guineas, and Hambletonian won by half a neck.

His last classics were the two Guineas of 1827, when, aged 60, he won on Arab and Turcoman. His last ride was on Conservator at Newmarket on 6 November 1831. He was still able to ride at 8 st 7 lb (54 kg), although he had to be careful with his weight, sitting down to a traditional dinner of goose only on the last day of the season.

His final total of 27 Classic wins remained for 150 years, although it is considered possible he won two further Classics which are uncredited.

== Retirement and death ==
When he retired, on account of his famous riding stamina, there was a public call for a race between him and the famous sportsman Squire Osbaldeston "to ride for 25 days or till either of them dropped." He was not to enjoy a long retirement. Only months after retiring from the saddle he died on 5 February 1832, "in the esteem of all the racing world." He is buried in the Orton Longueville parish churchyard, beneath a tomb carrying the inscription:

No better rider ever crossed a horse;
Honour his guide, he died without remorse.
Jockeys attend - from his example learn
The meed that honest worth is sure to earn.

== Personality ==
"He has left behind him not merely an example for all young jockeys to follow, but proof that honesty is the best policy, for he died in the esteem of all the racing world and in the possession of a comfortable independence acquired from his profession."

— extract from obituary, quoted in Great Jockeys of the Flat (Tanner & Cranham, 1992)

Buckle was legendary for his stamina. He would think nothing of making a 92-mile (148 km) round trip between his farm at Orton Longueville to Newmarket just for a trial.

His outside hobbies revolved around his farm at Orton Longueville. He bred cattle, sheep, greyhounds, bulldogs and fighting cocks. Though the livestock he bred were of good quality (especially the sheep), he did not make much profit.CITEREFNew_Sporting_Magazine1832 He would also ride with the Hertfordshire Hounds, although he was known for falling at every jump. He was invariably seen accompanied by his bulldog.

Buckle was known as honest - he would ride finishes against his own money in races - but lacking in intelligence. His obituary stated that he "died in the esteem of all the racing world."

== Personal life ==
Buckle first married at the age of 24, but his wife died shortly after. He married his second wife, Jane Thornton, the daughter of a veterinary surgeon, in Lichfield in 1807. The couple lived in Orton Longueville, Huntingdonshire and had three sons, before moving first to Peterborough, then Bury St. Edmunds in 1822 for his sons' education, then back to Peterborough.

== Major wins ==
(United Kingdom) Great Britain

- 1,000 Guineas Stakes - (6) - Corinne (1818), Rowena (1820), Zeal (1821), Whizgig (1822), Zinc (1823), Arab (1827)
- 2,000 Guineas Stakes - (5) - Hephestion (1810), Pindarrie (1820), Reginald (1821), Pastille (1822), Turcoman (1827)
- Epsom Derby - (5) - John Bull (1792), Daedalus (1794), Tyrant (1802), Phantom (1811), Emilius (1823)
- Epsom Oaks - (9) - Nike (1797), Bellissima (1798), Bellina (1799), Scotia (1802), Theophania (1803), Meteora (1805), Neva (1817), Corinne (1818), Zinc (1823)
- St Leger - (2) - Champion (1800), Sancho (1804)

== Bibliography ==
- Brailsford, Dennis. "Buckle, Francis". Oxford Dictionary of National Biography (online ed.). Oxford University Press. doi:10.1093/ref:odnb/52816. (Subscription, Wikipedia Library access or UK public library membership required.)
- Mortimer, Roger; Onslow, Richard; Willett, Peter (1978). Biographical Encyclopaedia of British Racing. London: Macdonald and Jane's. ISBN 0-354-08536-0.
- Tanner, Michael; Cranham, Gerry (1992). Great Jockeys of the Flat. Enfield, Middlesex: Guinness Publishing. ISBN 0-85112-989-7.
- "Memoir of the Late Francis Buckle". The New Sporting Magazine. 3. Baldwin A Cradock. May 1832.
