= List of Ukrainian horse breeds =

This is a list of the horse breeds usually considered to be wholly or partly of Ukrainian origin. Some may have complex or obscure histories, so inclusion here does not necessarily imply that a breed is predominantly or exclusively Ukrainian.

English name	Other names	Notes	Image
German Bessarabian		extinct	
Hutsul	Ukrainian: Гуцульський кінь; Hutsulsky kin; Gutsul		
Nogai		extinct	
Novoolexandrian Draught	Ukrainian: новоолександрівська ваговозна; Novooleksandrivska Vagovozna; Novooleksandrivskii Vagovoz; Newolexandrian Heavy Draught; Novoalexandrivska Cart		
Strelets Arab		extinct; the Tersk derives from it	|
Ukrainian Riding Horse	Ukrainian: українська верхова; Ukrayinska Verkhova; Ukrainian Saddle Horse		
