= Strelets Arab =

Extinct Ukrainian breed of horse

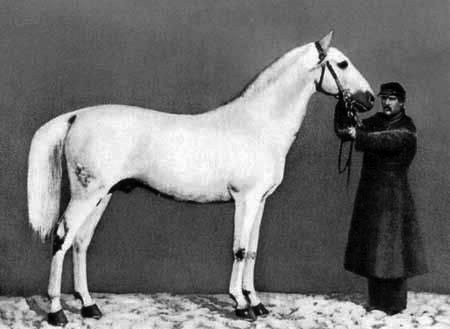
- The stallion Bivouac, winner of a gold medal at the Exposition Universelle of 1867
- Conservation status: Extinct
- Other names: Ukrainian: стрілецька; Striletska; Streletsky; Strelets Horse
- Country of origin: Ukraine
- Standard: extinct
- Use: light cavalry horse

Traits
- Height: 154–160 cm
- Colour: grey

The Strelets Arab or Strelets Horse is an extinct Ukrainian breed of light cavalry horse. It was bred in the nineteenth century at the Striletsky State Stud in Luhansk Oblast of Ukraine, (Note: Ukrainian: Племінні господарства Державне підприємство Стрілецький кінний завод № 60, 'State Enterprise Striletsky Horse Factory Nº 60'.) from Arab and a variety of other stock. Numbers were gravely reduced by the events of the Russian Revolution and the Russian Civil War, and the breed came close to disappearing. The surviving stock – consisting of two stallions and a few mares – was taken to the Tersk Stud in the North Caucasus and used as the basis of the new Tersk breed of riding horse.

== History ==
The Strelets Arab was bred in the nineteenth century at the Striletsky State Stud, near the village of Striltsivka, which at that time was in the Starobelsky district of the Kharkov Governorate of the Russian Empire, and is now in Milovsky Raion of Luhansk Oblast in easternmost Ukraine, close to the Russian border. It derived from a complex series of cross-breedings, initially of Arab and Anglo-Arab or Thoroughbred stock, later with some input from Karabakh, Orlov-Rostopchin, Persian and Turkmene horses. The predominant influence was that of the Arab, and the result was a horse of Arab appearance, but somewhat larger and faster. Among the Arab stallions used in the creation of the breed were Obayan Serebryany, a grey foaled in 1851; Tsiprian, foaled in 1875; and Tsenny, foaled in 1899, who was the sire of both Tsenitel and Tsilindr, the last two stallions of the breed to survive.

As with other Russian horse populations, numbers of the Strelets were gravely reduced by the events of the Russian Revolution and the Russian Civil War, and it came close to disappearing. Two stallions and a few mares survived, which was judged to be too small a number to allow the breed to be recovered. Instead, these were taken to the Tersk Stud in the North Caucasus and used as the foundation stock in the development of the new Tersk breed of riding horse. The Strelets Arab is considered to be extinct.

The Strelets also contributed to the development of the Don and Kustanai breeds.

== Characteristics ==
The Strelets was grey; some – including the last two stallions, Tsenitel and Tsilindr – were of an unusual silver-grey colour. Heights at the withers varied from 154 to 160 cm.

== Use ==
The Strelets was bred as a light fast cavalry horse; it was also used for sport riding and as a circus horse.

The last representatives of the breed became the foundation stock for the Tersk Horse. The Strelets had earlier contributed to the development of the Don and Kustanai breeds.
