= 1821 in sports =

1821 in sports describes the year's events in world sport.

== Boxing ==
Events

- Tom Cribb retains his English championship but no fights involving him are recorded in 1821.

== Cricket ==
Events

- In the Gentlemen v Players match at Lord's Cricket Ground, the Gentlemen concede the game having gone well behind on 1st innings. Derek Birley comments that it is a Coronation Match to celebrate the accession of King George IV and "... a suitably murky affair".

England

- Most runs – Thomas Beagley 181 (HS 113*)
- Most wickets – Thomas Howard 13 (BB 7–?)

== Football ==
England

- By this time, some form of order is beginning to be imposed on what has for centuries been a chaotic pastime played not so much by teams as by mobs. This form of football, known more politely as "folk football", is essentially a public holiday event. Shrove Tuesday is a traditional day for games across the country.
- The games are generally thought to be free for alls with no holds barred and extremely violent. As for kicking and handling of the ball, it is certain that both means of moving the ball towards the goals are in use.
- In the early nineteenth century, the public schools begin to devise their own versions, rules of which are verbally agreed and handed down over many years. Each school (e.g., Eton, Harrow, Rugby, Winchester) has its own variations.

== Horse racing ==
England

- 1,000 Guineas Stakes – Zeal
- 2,000 Guineas Stakes – Reginald
- The Derby – Gustavus
- The Oaks – Augusta
- St. Leger Stakes – Jack Spigot

== Bibliography ==
- Derek Birley, A Social History of English Cricket, Aurum, 1999
