= 1823 in sports =

1823 in sports describes the year's events in world sport.

== Boxing ==
Events

- 20 May — Tom Spring is finally able to defend his English Championship title when he receives a challenge from Bill Neat. The two meet on Hinckley Downs and the fight ends in the eighth round when Neat is forced to retire, having sustained a broken arm in the sixth round.

== Cricket ==
Events

- The size of the wicket is increased to 27 x 8 inches.

England

- Most runs – William Ward 328 (HS 120)
- Most wickets – William Ashby 23 (BB 6–?)

== Football ==
Events

- The traditional date of the William Webb Ellis legend. He is the Rugby School pupil who, it is said, "with a fine disregard for the rules of football, took the ball in his hands and ran with it". Even if the tale is true, the game will have been a version of folk football with rules that had been verbally agreed by the Rugby School pupils. Such rules are always open to challenge and it may be that an incident like this did occur with the result that a "dribbling" game became primarily a handling game.

== Horse racing ==
England

- 1,000 Guineas Stakes – Zinc
- 2,000 Guineas Stakes – Nicolo
- The Derby – Emilius
- The Oaks – Zinc
- St. Leger Stakes – Barefoot
