= 1817 in sports =

1817 in sports describes the year's events in world sport.

== Boxing ==
Events

- Tom Cribb retains his English championship but no fights involving him are recorded in 1817.

== Cricket ==
Events

- The 1817 season sees the first recorded instance of the Cambridge University v. Cambridge Town Club fixture that becomes almost annual until the 1860s. It is also the earliest first-class match to involve either team. There is a very fine line between Cambridge Town Club and Cambridgeshire CCC, the one dovetailing with the other. Similar scenarios are Nottingham/Notts, Manchester/Lancashire and Sheffield/Yorkshire.
- William Lambert scores two centuries (107* & 157) in the same match, the first player known to achieve the feat in a first-class match. Lambert is then banned for life by MCC from appearing at Lord's on the grounds that he has "sold" an earlier Nottingham versus England match. Nottingham have won the game by 30 runs despite a first innings deficit with many gamblers losing heavily. Whether Lambert is actually guilty is highly questionable and certainly no proper hearing is ever organised. The whole affair is believed to have been contrived by Lord Frederick Beauclerk who wishes to settle an "old score".

England

- Most runs – William Lambert 445 (HS 157)
- Most wickets – Thomas Howard 44 (BB 5–?)

== Horse racing ==
England

- 1,000 Guineas Stakes – Neva
- 2,000 Guineas Stakes – Manfred
- The Derby – Azor
- The Oaks – Neva
- St. Leger Stakes – Ebor
