= Orlov-Rostopchin =

Russian saddle horse

- Conservation status: Critic
- Country of origin: Russia
- Use: Cavalry and equestrianism

Traits
- Height: 1,53 m to 1,74 m
- Color: Generally black

The Orlov-Rostopchin, or Russian saddle horse (Russian: Русская верховая), is a breed of saddle and sport horse originating in Russia. Born in the 19th century from the fusion of the breeding saddle horses of Counts Orlov and Rostopchin, it has had an eventful history. Very famous at the end of the 19th century as a dressage and cavalry horse, the breed was decimated after the First World War. It was restored by Semion Boudienny, and became known as the "Russian Saddle". Virtually extinct after the Second World War, it was unofficially recreated in the 1950s to produce the Ukrainian Saddle. Thanks to its success in dressage competitions up to international level, Russian breeders have been officially reviving it since 1978, from crosses with Trakehners. The Russian saddle still suffers from a lack of recognition.

The modern Russian saddle horse is presented as a sport-elegant, black-coated horse. Selection is drastic. It includes two evaluations, at two and four years of age, before the animal is allowed to reproduce. Numbers are very small, and the breed is still considered critically endangered. Exported to the United States in the 1990s, it led to the creation of a breed association in North America.

== Name ==
"Orlov-Rostopchin" is the breed's original name, formalized in 1845 with the merger of Count Orlov's herd with that of Count Rostopchin. The name "Russian Saddle" (russkyi verkhovod) is more recent, being formalized almost a century later by Soviet Union officials eager to erase traces of the horses' aristocratic origins. In Russia, the breed's official name is verkhovod russkyi. In recent years, however, "Orlov-Rostopchin" has become the international name. According to Jean-Louis Gouraud, Russia is the only country in the world where horse breeds are named after their breeders.

== History ==
The origins of the breed's development can be traced back to the mid-18th century, when Russia had extensive equine stock for transport, military use and classical dressage, in conjunction with the French court for the latter purpose. The Tsars practiced artistic court equitation, which required a quality saddle horse. Catherine II called on the Orlov brothers to carry out this type of breeding. Count Orlov-Chesmensky (1737–1807) sought to produce two equine lines, one for riding and the other for light trotting.

=== Orlov saddle horse ===
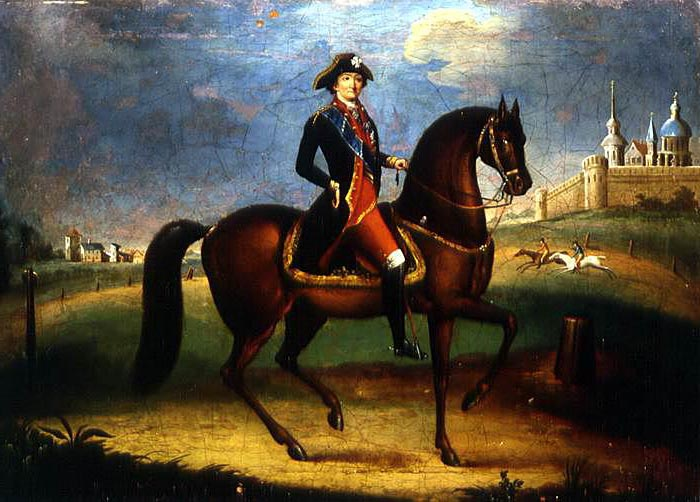
Count Alexei Orlov riding one of his saddle horses, from an oil painting of unknown origin, 1796.

At the end of the eighteenth century, Count Alexei Orlov began crossbreeding Anglo-Arabians. This was the first saddle horse breed developed in Russia, at the Khrenov stud farm. Two lines emerged: the Smetanka gray Arabian and the Saltan bay Arabian. Cross-breeding between these two lines gave rise to a saddle horse known locally in Russian as the Orlovskaia verkhovaya, or "Orlov saddle horse", several decades before the emergence of the Anglo-Arabian breed in Europe. The golden bay stallion Yachma I, born in 1816, can be considered the true founder of the breed.

In addition to Anglo-Arab crosses, Frederiksborger, Karabakh, Spanish, Neapolitan, Turkish and Persian stallions (including perhaps an Akhal-Teke and a Turkoman) were used in Count Orlov's exclusively Russian broodmare band. He applies a strict selection process and practices inbreeding, while continuing to regularly import broodmares, mainly Thoroughbreds, from England. The Orlov saddle horse quickly became popular throughout Russia, thanks to its beauty and dressage qualities. He gained distinctive characteristics that set him apart from his Arabian and European ancestors. Orlovs are large (1.60 m on average), strong-boned yet refined, and mainly dark bay or black in color. Its head is graceful, its tail carriage particularly elegant, its feet solid and its movements full of grace and elegance.

=== Rostopchin ===
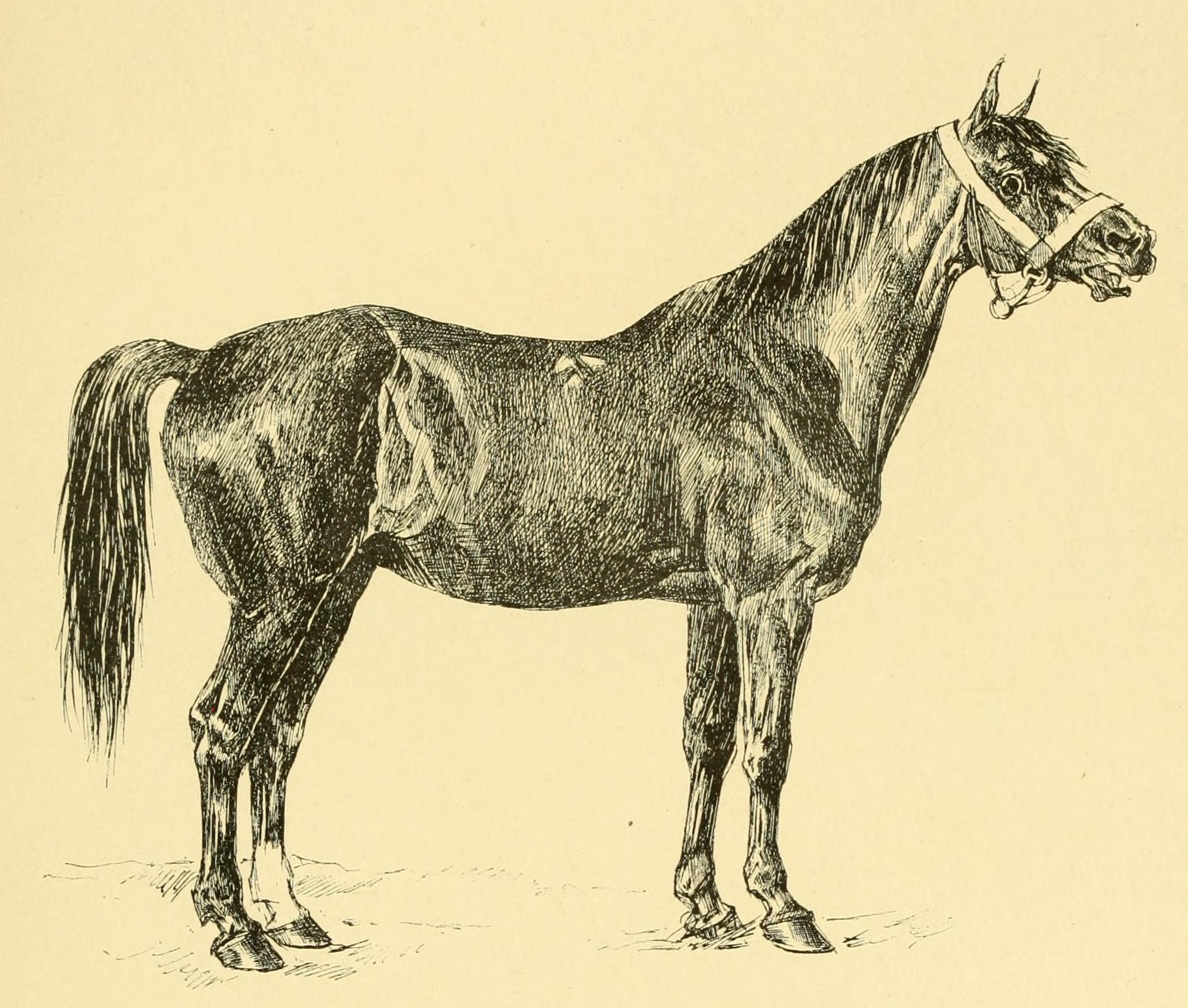
Fenella, Rostopchin mare.

At the same time, another Anglo-Arabian horse was developed in the early 19th century by Count and Squire Andrei Fedorovich Rostopchin (ru). He set up a stud farm at Voronovo, near Moscow, then transferred it to Annenkovo in 1815. From 1802, he imported four Arabian stallions of Siglavy and Koheilan stock, and crossed them with Karabakh, Kabardin, Karabair, Persian and Don mares. He also practices rigorous selection, based in particular on speed, type and working ability. The Rostopchin is a lively, agile saddle horse, generally black or bay. It is smaller than the Orlov saddle horse, averaging 1.50 m in height.

=== Orlov-Rostopchin ===
Both the Khrenov and Rostopchin studs were nationalized by the Russian government in 1845. At first, the two breeds were kept separately. Gradually, Rostopchin mares were crossed with Orlov stallions, so that the new breed became known as Orlov-Rostopchin. The Orlov stallions had the greatest influence. In 1867, the stallions Frant, Fakel and Fazan were honored at the 1867 World's Fair as "perfect saddle horses". In 1883, the Orlov-Rostopchin was a large, elegant saddle horse for the Russian army. In the 1880s, the Orlov-Rostopchin was bred specifically as a dressage mount for the cavalry, but not as a battle horse. The breed became very famous internationally thanks to its presence at the Tsarist court, its use as a gift in Russia's diplomatic relations, and numerous exhibitions from the mid-19th to the early 20th century, during which it won various prizes for excellence. Some of these world-famous horses are the stallions Fakel, Fazan, Priyatel, Priezd, Vorobei and Bayanchik, out of Felkersam I and II, and Saltan.

The Orlov-Rostopchin is considered an ideal saddle horse and cavalry horse, even a sport horse, for both carriage driving and dressage. However, Matthew Horace Hayes observes that they are not good saddle horses, but rather light carriages.

The First World War was almost fatal for the Orlov-Rostopchin. The vast majority of these horses destined for the Tsarist army died in the conflict or its aftermath, the Russian Revolution. A fire killed a large part of the stock, leading to the publication of various documents announcing the disappearance of the Orlov-Rostopchin breed.

=== First rebirth of the Russian saddle ===
Nevertheless, survivors were located and bred by people who respected the breed for its qualities, sometimes in crossbreeding with horses of a similar type. In 1931, Semion Boudienny took it upon himself to gather the few surviving horses at the Limarev stud and attempt to regenerate the breed. He found only five stallions and four mares. He moved the stud to Derkul in 1933, adding 28 half-blood mares, nine Anglo-Arab mares and 45 mares of other breeds. He gradually eliminated the influence of other breeds through cross-breeding. At the request of the Soviet government, the resulting horse was given the name "Russian Saddle". It is the result of strict selection based on type and appearance, with a wide openness to crossbreeding. The new Russian saddle breed was presented at an agricultural show in 1939, and compared with the Arabian horse. Before the outbreak of the Second World War, the breed's preservation was taken for granted. The Second World War wiped out the herd once again, with the only survivors being the horses shown at the Moscow Agricultural Show. The attempt to move the horses to the Urals during the German invasion of 1941 was a failure, as the animals were bombed and died.

=== Ukrainian Saddlehorse ===
Rebirth of the breed proved extremely difficult, with only two stallions and one mare remaining. In the 1950s, an unofficial restoration of the breed began, using an undocumented selection process. New crosses with Trakehner and Anglo-Hungarian horses, supplemented by Arabian horses and Thoroughbreds, were used to recreate a horse close to the Anglo-Arab, which was then crossed with Akhal-Tékés. Thereafter, only pure-bred Russian Saddlebred stallions are allowed to stud. After eight years, this new Derkul-bred breed took the name Ukrainian Saddle. In this Cold War era, horse breeding was no longer in favor in the USSR. Khrushchev ordered the elimination of saddle horses and racehorses for meat production. However, the country shone in dressage riding at Olympic level. These Olympic horses come mainly from the Aleksandriisky and Dnipropetrovsk stud farms.

=== Second renaissance of the Russian saddle ===
In the 1970s, the excellence of dressage equitation was recognized by the Breeding Institute of the Soviet Union, which called for the official restoration of the Russian saddle horse. A selection program was launched in 1978. The Ukrainian Saddle bloodlines that retained traces of the old Orlov-Rostopchin breed were moved to the Starojilovski State Stud, southeast of Moscow. Russian zootechnicians crossbreed with Trakehners, Anglo and Arabo-Trakehners, Thoroughbreds, Akhal-Tékés and Orlov trotters. Although the Russian Saddlebred is presumed to be absorbed into the Ukrainian Saddlebred, the reality is that the Russian Saddlebred is being re-created in the same way as in the past. This horse takes the Soviet dressage team to international competitions.

The animals must have at least a quarter Orlov-Rostopchin origin. The aim is not quite to recreate the old breed, but rather to bring out a horse that possesses its qualities. The Russian Ministry of Agriculture eventually relinquished all control over the project, and entrusted the restoration of the studbook to the National Academy of Agriculture, managed by K. A. Timiriazev. Breeding objectives were defined, including a gradual increase in the number of broodmares to 300, a gradual increase in the breed's size and build, light gaits, a quest for elegance and refinement, and an emphasis on sporting qualities, particularly for dressage. Horses that did not conform to the desired type were sold, while those that did conform were kept as breeding stock. Horses were gradually moved from the Starojilovski stud to the Sergeiyevski and Korobovo studs, where new bloodlines were created. Control of the studbook remained in Timiriazev's hands. A few crosses with Persian and Thoroughbred horses were made before the studbook was officially reopened in 1994, with its publication by the National Agronomic Institute in Moscow. In 1988, two Orlov-Rostopchin geldings, Barin and Dikson, competed for the USSR at the Seoul Olympic Games.

The break-up of the USSR had mixed consequences for the breed. The main breeding group is kept at the Starojilovski stud, but the lack of funding from the Russian Equestrian Federation is detrimental to the Orlov-Rostopchin. The first horse exports were made possible by perestroika. Some of the best horses were sold to competing countries under the name of "Russian Trakehner", but their new buyers were not concerned with preserving the breed's bloodlines. At the end of 1996, a very elegant black elite I stallion, Iskusnik, was imported by a breeding operation in the USA. The breed is considered critically endangered. In 2007, the Russian Saddlebred is suffering from competition from other sport horse breeds and a lack of recognition, even in its own country.

== Description ==
This is a tall, elegant saddle horse with good conformation. They are usually between 1.55 m and 1.65 m in height, with the modern breed reaching between 1.53 m and 1.74 m. The head is light, with a concave profile, broad forehead and long neck. The withers are long and well defined. The back and rump are long and muscular, with rounded ribs and elongated legs. The desired conformation is that of an elegant sport horse capable of gathering, with a long, graceful neck and long, lean legs. The animal must be both handsome and athletic.

=== Coat ===
The coat of the interwar Russian saddle is exclusively black. It is also the only coat accepted for the breed as it was recreated after the Second World War, with only black or black pangarese without white markings being accepted. The criteria are now a little more flexible. Zain black is the most desirable color. Many individuals have small white markings, small barnacles and stars on the head. Over 90% of the studbook's horses are black or seal brown. White is forbidden above the knee or hock, as are lists that extend beyond the head or combine with blue eyes.

=== Temperament, care and gaits ===
Selection at the Khrenov stud has forged a breed resistant to extreme climatic conditions. Horses are raised in paddocks all year round, whatever the weather conditions. The breed has been the subject of a study to determine the presence of the DMRT3 gene mutation responsible for supplementary gaits: the study of 14 subjects failed to detect the presence of this mutation in the Russian Saddle, and there do not appear to be ambling horses among the breed.

=== Selection ===
Since the second half of the 20th century, the breed has been regularly evaluated in Russia. Young Orlov-Rostopchins are judged at two and four years of age, to be classified into a category: Elite-1, 2 or 3; Class I-1, I-2 or I-3. Only horses classified as Elite-1 or Elite-2 are allowed to breed, with a few Elite-3s that have proven themselves late in life. The evaluation covers type, proportions, conformation, ancestry, coat color and ability under saddle. At two years of age, only gaits and free jumping are evaluated. At four years of age, it is more selective and includes mounted tests and a show jumping course. Horses selected for a particular discipline are evaluated for that discipline. Selected stallions become breeding stock. Stallions often compete up to the age of five or six, before embarking on their breeding careers.

== Uses ==
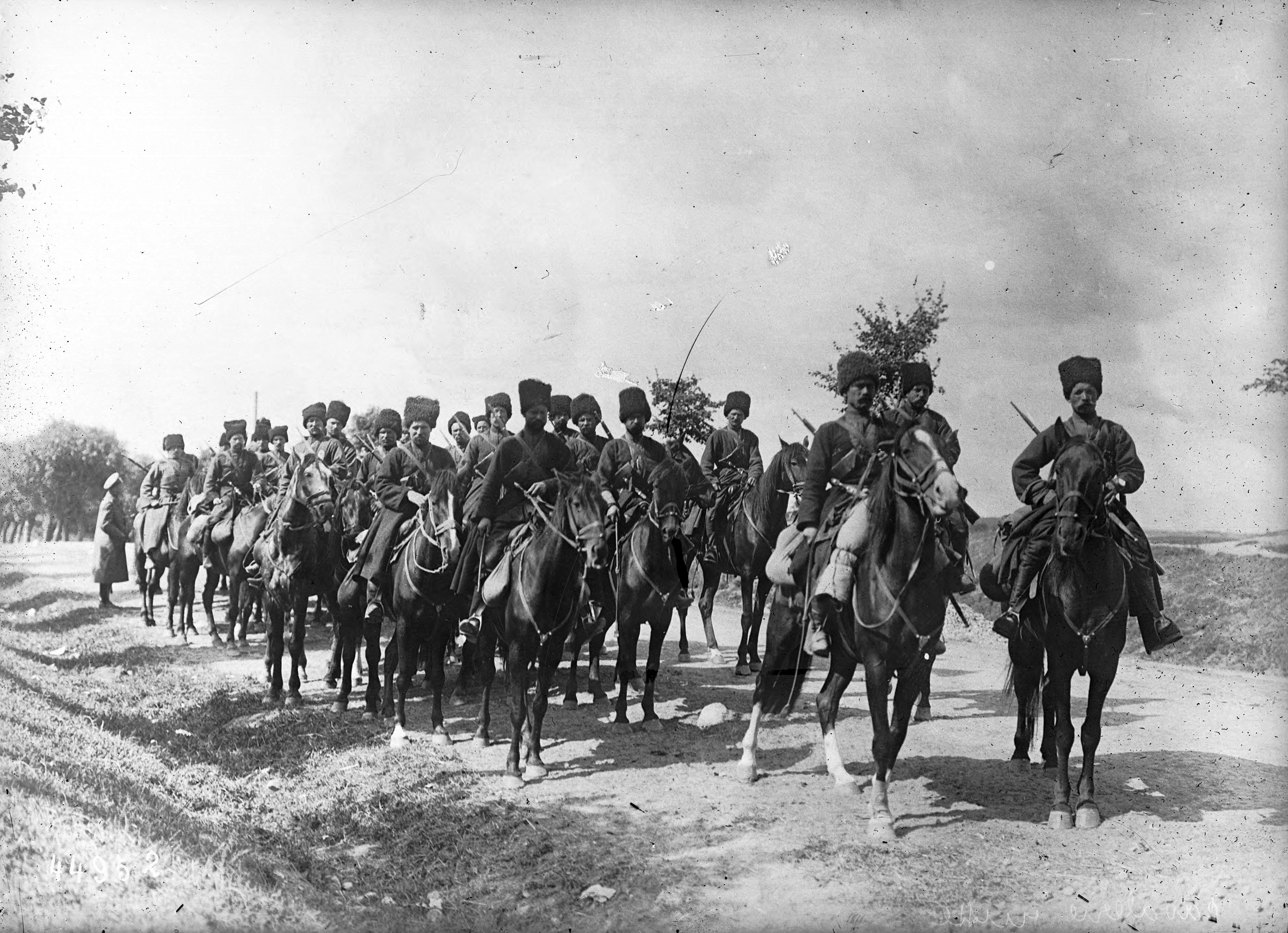
Russian Army Cossacks in 1915.

This saddle horse has always been primarily used for riding, followed by dressage competitions. Because of its great elegance, the Orlov-Rostopchin is considered a breed improver. In crossbreeding, it has influenced the Don horse, the Strelets, and several horses from the steppes of eastern Russia, including the Kustanair.

== Breeding diffusion ==
The Uppsala University study (2010) considers the Orlov-Rostopchin to be a breed with international and transboundary distribution. According to the FAO's 2007 assessment, the breed is still critically endangered (status "C"). The Orlov saddle horse (Orlovskaya verkhovaya) and the Rostopchin are both listed as extinct in the FAO's DAD-IS database. The organization also lists the Russkaya krovnaya verkhovaya (Russian saddle) as an extinct saddle breed, absorbed by the Ukrainian saddle in 1945.

The Orlov-Rostopchin is very rare, with only eight stallions and 96 mares recorded in 1988. According to the International Museum of the Horse, the breed's worldwide population is around 500 (in 2015). A few horses are present in the United States, where the breed has an association (Orlov-Rostopchin Sporthorse Association) managing the herd for all of North America. However, this association does not work with representatives of the Russian studbook, and is therefore not considered representative by the Russians. Collaboration between Russian and American breeders appears to be a necessary condition for the breed's survival.

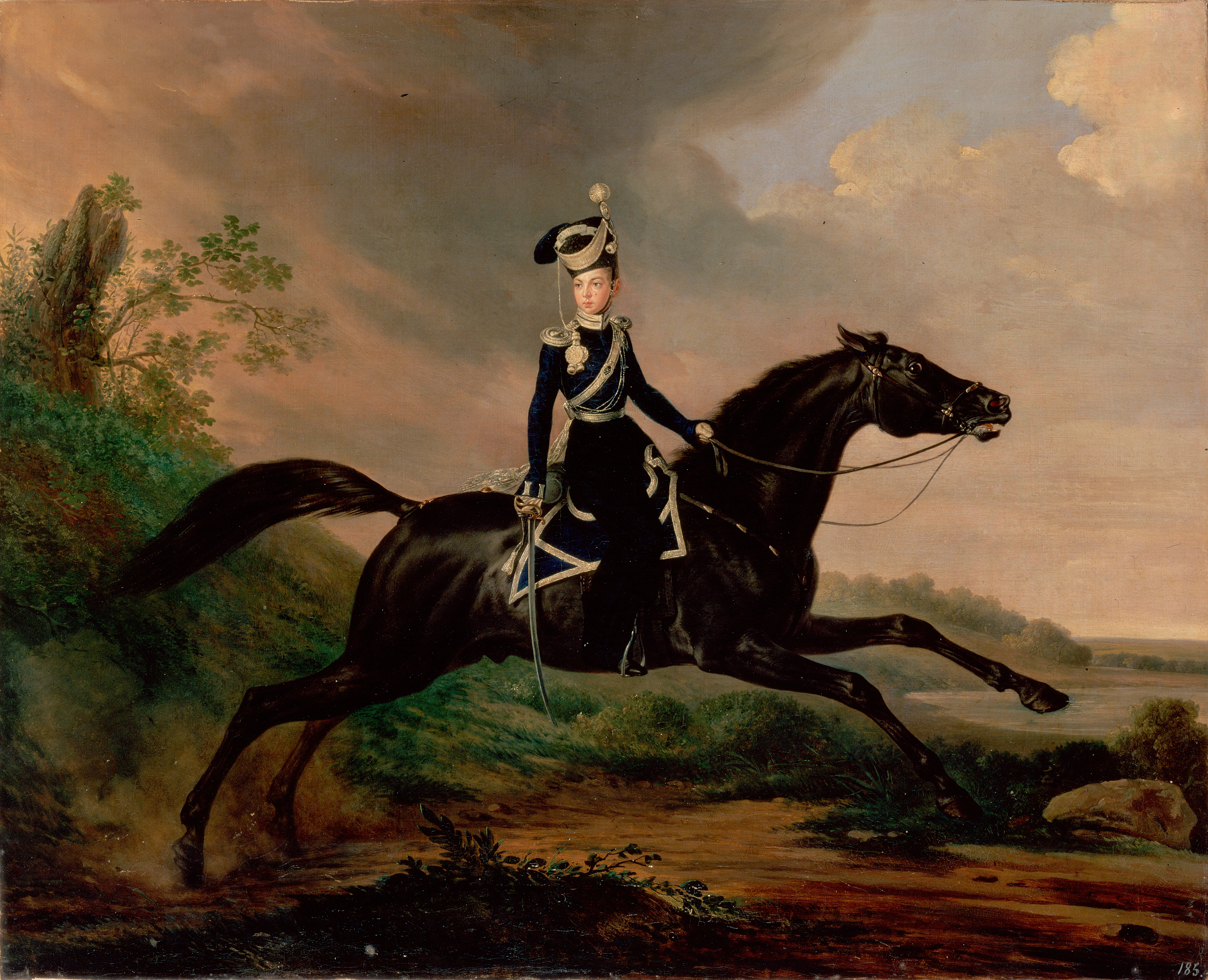
Equestrian portrait of Alexander II by Franz Krüger, 1832.

== In the culture ==
According to Jean-Louis Gouraud, the Orlov-Rostopchin is often depicted on equestrian portraits commissioned by Russian aristocrats in the 19th century, particularly those by Nicolas Swertschkoff. It is cited as the first saddle horse developed for the Tsar in 1845, in John Ringo's novel Choosers of the Slain.

== See also ==
- List of horse breeds
- Horses in Russia

== Bibliography ==
- Simonoff, Leonid; Moerder, Jean (1894). es Races chevalines : Avec une étude spéciale sur les chevaux russes (in French). Librairie agricole de la maison rustique.
- Gouraud, Jean-Louis (2012). Le pérégrin émerveillé : Mémoires, journaux, témoignages (in French). Éditions Actes Sud. ISBN 978-2-330-01524-4.
- Hayes, Matthew (1900). Among Horses in Russia. R. A. Everett.
- Hendricks, Bonnie (2007). "Russian Saddle Horse". International Encyclopedia of Horse Breeds. University of Oklahoma Press. ISBN 978-0806138848.
- Kamberov, Boris (1988). Konevodstvo i Konnozavodstvo Rossii (in Russian). Rosagropromizdat. pp. 64–71.
- Kleimola, Ann (1995). "Good breeding, muscovite style: « Horse culture » in modern early rus". Beiträge zur "7. Internationalen Konferenz zur Geschichte des Kiever und des Moskauer Reiches". Otto Harrassowitz Verlag. ISBN 3447034920.
- Kozhevnikov, E.; Kop'eva, E. (1990). Comments on breed names (in French). Konevodstvo i Konnyĭ Sport. pp. 14–15. ISSN 0023-3285.
