= Rowena (horse) =

British Thoroughbred racehorse

- Sire: Haphazard
- Grandsire: Sir Peter Teazle
- Dam: Prudence
- Damsire: Waxy
- Sex: Mare
- Foaled: 1817
- Country: United Kingdom
- Colour: Chestnut
- Breeder: George FitzRoy, 4th Duke of Grafton
- Owner: Duke of Grafton
- Trainer: Robert Robson
- Record: 2:1-1-0
- Earnings: £2,250

Major wins
- 1000 Guineas (1816)

Rowena (foaled 1817) was a British Thoroughbred racehorse and broodmare that won the classic 1000 Guineas at Newmarket in 1820. On her only other appearance, she finished second in the Oaks Stakes. She later became a successful broodmare.

== Background ==
Rowena was a chestnut mare bred by her owner George FitzRoy, 4th Duke of Grafton at his stud at Euston Hall in Suffolk. Her sire Haphazard won 15 races between 1800 and 1804 before becoming a successful breeding stallion. His offspring included the 2000 Guineas winners Antar and Reginald, as well as the St Leger winner Filho da Puta. Rowena's dam Prudence was a daughter of Prunella, described as one of the most important broodmares in the history of the Thoroughbred breed. Prudence herself produced several major winners (all beginning with the letter "R") including the 2000 Guineas winner Reginald and the Riddlesworth Stakes winners Rebecca and Rufus. Rowena was Prudence's third foal, but the first to appear on a racecourse, her two older siblings having died young. Grafton sent the filly to be trained at Newmarket by Robert Robson, the so-called "Emperor of Trainers".

== Racing career ==
=== 1820: three-year-old season ===
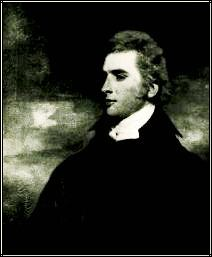
The Duke of Grafton, who bred and owned Rowena

Rowena made her racecourse debut in the 1000 Guineas on 20 April at Newmarket's First Spring meeting. Racing over the Ditch Mile course, she started the 7/4 favourite against five opponents for a race which, despite its title, carried prize money of 2,100 guineas. According to the Sporting Magazine, Rowena "won easy", beating Mr Wyndham's unnamed filly that had been made the 5/2 second favourite. Ownership of the runner-up subsequently passed to Wyndham's father the Earl of Egremont, who named her Caroline. Like most of the horses trained by Robson for the Duke of Grafton, the winner was ridden by Francis Buckle.

On 19 May, Rowena was sent to Epsom Downs Racecourse to contest the Oaks Stakes over one and a half miles in which her main rival was expected to be the Duke of Rutland's Emmeline, the winner of the Riddlesworth Stakes at the Newmarket Craven meeting. The Epsom meeting was badly affected by stormy weather, with heavy rain and strong winds, resulting in a much reduced attendance for both the Derby on Thursday and the Oaks a day later. In a field of 13 runners, Rowena was made the favourite at odds of 6/4, with Emmeline next in the betting on 4/1. Rowena finished second to Caroline, which reversed the 1000 Guineas form to win by a length with Bombasine third and Emmeline unplaced. Rowena does not appear to have raced after her defeat at Epsom.

== Stud record ==
Rowena was retired from racing to become a broodmare at the Duke of Grafton's stud. After producing five foals, she was sold to Mr Greville and then passed into the ownership of Lord Chesterfield. Her first foal, Nigel, sired by Election, won several races in 1826, including a King's Plate at Guildford. Through her daughter Blanche of Deven, Rowena was the remote female ancestor of two Italian classic winners and the French horse Fantastic, whose wins included the Prix Royal Oak and the Prix du Cadran.

== Pedigree ==
Pedigree of Rowena (GB), chestnut mare, 1817
Sire Haphazard (GB) 1797	Sir Peter Teazle; 1784	Highflyer	Herod
Sire Haphazard (GB) 1797	Sir Peter Teazle; 1784	Highflyer	Rachel
Sire Haphazard (GB) 1797	Sir Peter Teazle; 1784	Papillon	Snap
Sire Haphazard (GB) 1797	Sir Peter Teazle; 1784	Papillon	Miss Cleveland
Sire Haphazard (GB) 1797	Miss Hervey; 1775	Eclipse	Marske
Sire Haphazard (GB) 1797	Miss Hervey; 1775	Eclipse	Spilletta
Sire Haphazard (GB) 1797	Miss Hervey; 1775	Clio	Young Cade
Sire Haphazard (GB) 1797	Miss Hervey; 1775	Clio	Starling mare
Dam Prudence (GB) 1811	Waxy; 1790	Potoooooooo	Eclipse
Dam Prudence (GB) 1811	Waxy; 1790	Potoooooooo	Sportsmistress
Dam Prudence (GB) 1811	Waxy; 1790	Maria	Herod
Dam Prudence (GB) 1811	Waxy; 1790	Maria	Lisette
Dam Prudence (GB) 1811	Prunella; 1788	Highflyer	Herod
Dam Prudence (GB) 1811	Prunella; 1788	Highflyer	Rachel
Dam Prudence (GB) 1811	Prunella; 1788	Promise	Snap
Dam Prudence (GB) 1811	Prunella; 1788	Promise	Julia (Family: 1-e)

- Rowena's pedigree contained a large amount of inbreeding. She was inbred 3 × 3 to Highflyer, meaning that this stallion appears twice in the third generation of her pedigree. She was also inbred 3 × 4 to Eclipse, 4 × 4 to Snap and 4 × 4 × 4 to Herod.
