= Hephestion (horse) =

British-bred Thoroughbred racehorse

- Sire: Alexander
- Grandsire: Eclipse
- Dam: Olivia
- Damsire: Justice
- Sex: Stallion
- Foaled: 1807
- Country: United Kingdom
- Colour: Bay
- Breeder: Robert Grosvenor, 2nd Earl Grosvenor
- Owner: Robert Grosvenor, 2nd Earl Grosvenor
- Trainer: Robert Robson
- Record: 18: 5-5-7

Major wins
- 2000 Guineas (1810)

Hephestion (foaled 1807) was a British Thoroughbred racehorse and best known for winning the classic 2000 Guineas in 1810. The rest of his racing career was undistinguished, as he recorded only four other victories in minor contests from a total of eighteen competitive races. He does not appear to have found a place at stud as a breeding stallion.

== Background ==
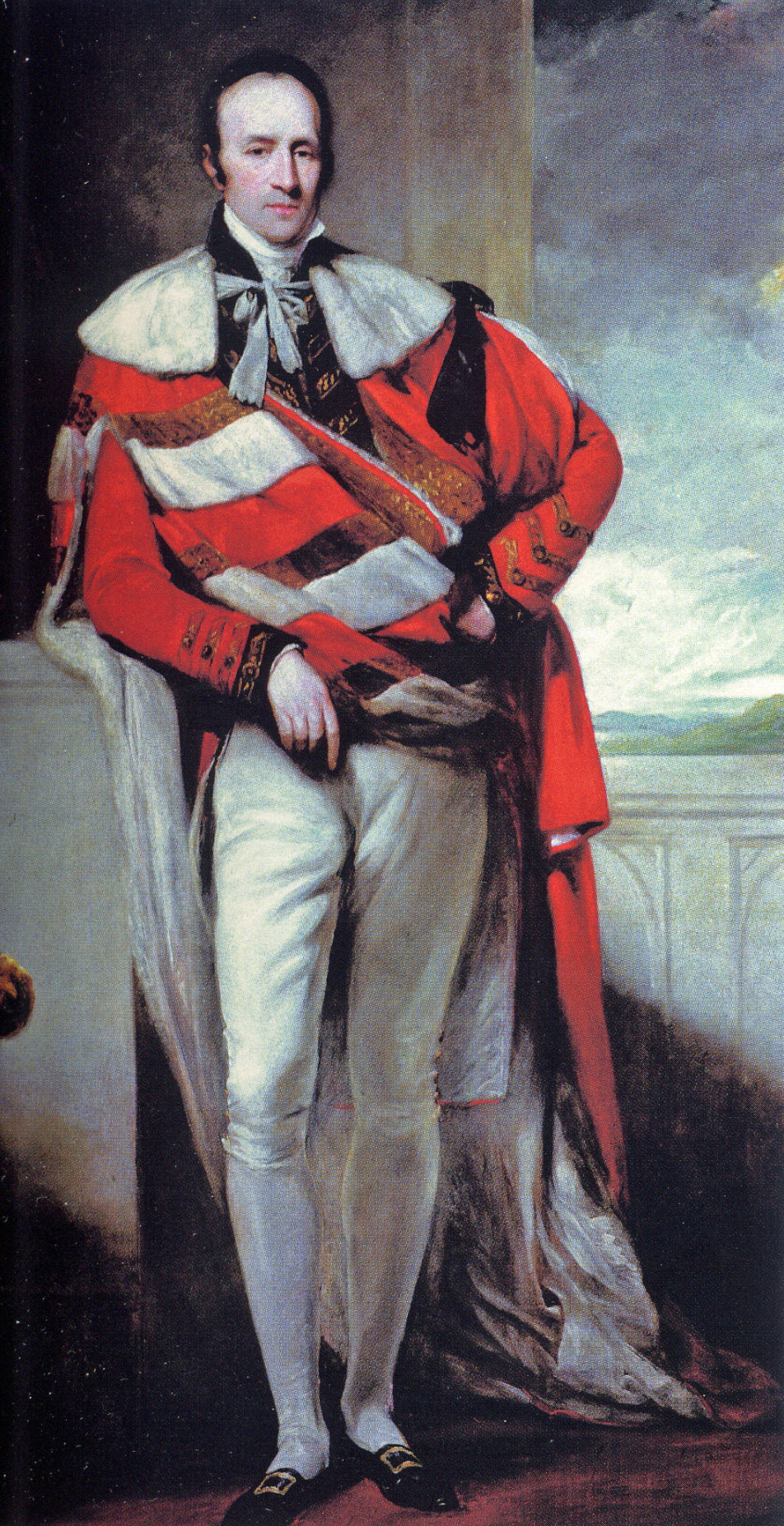
Lord Grosvenor, who bred Hephestion and owned him during the 1810 season

Hephestion was a bay horse bred by his owner Robert Grosvenor, 2nd Earl Grosvenor. He was sired by Grosvenor's stallion Alexander who was based at Figdale in Cheshire: Alexander's other offspring included The Oaks winner Nike and the unnamed but influential Alexander mare. Hephestion was the tenth of twelve foals produced by his dam Olivia, a full-sister of the Oaks winner Trifle. Grosvenor sent the filly to be trained at Newmarket by Robert Robson, the so-called "Emperor of Trainers".

== Racing career ==
=== 1810: three-year-old season ===
Hephestion began his racing career on 23 April the opening day of the 1810 flat racing season at Newmarket Racecourse. He started at odd of 5/1 for a produce sweepstakes over the Rowley Mile course and finished second of the six runners behind Pledge, a filly owned by the Duke of Grafton. At the next Newmarket meeting, Hephestion was one of nine three-year-olds, from an original entry of twenty-seven, to contest the second running of the 2,000 Guineas Stakes over the Rowley Mile. Ridden by Frank Buckle, he was made the 5/1 second favourite and won easily from Lord Kinnaird's colt The Dandy.

A month after his win at Newmarket, Hephestion was moved up in distance to contest the Derby Stakes over one and a half miles at Epsom Downs Racecourse. He started the 3/1 second favourite but finished unplaced behind Whalebone and The Dandy.

=== 1811: four-year-old season ===
Hephestion won four of his ten competitive races as a four-year-old in 1811. After being off the course for more than ten months, he reappeared at Newmarket in May in the colours of Mr Ladbroke. He won a sweepstakes over ten furlongs at the first spring meeting but at the next meeting two weeks later was beaten by Asmodeus in a five furlong sweepstakes and by Lord Oxford's filly Morgiana in a handicap race. By the end of that month he had entered the ownership of Sir H. Lippincott and at the Epsom Derby meeting he finished third in the Gold Cup over two miles after which he was campaigned at relatively minor courses. At Stockbridge Racecourse a week later he finished last of three runners in a sweepstakes. At the end of June Hephestion had three engagements at the Bibury Club meeting at Burford: he was withdrawn from the Sherborne Stakes, finished third in a four mile sweepstakes, received compromise when his rival failed to appear for a match race and then recorded his first competitive win of the season when he won a one mile match against a six-year-old mare named Matilda. His next appearance was at Bath Racecourse on 5 July, when he contested a handicap race run in a series of one mile heats, with the prize going to the first horse to win twice. Hephestion won the first heat, finished second in the next two, and claimed the victory when his only remaining rival, a mare named Viscountess, fell in the deciding heat. Two weeks later, he finished third behind Romana in the Cup over one and a half miles at Winchester Racecourse. On 30 July Hephestion ended his summer campaign by winning both heats of a £50 race at Stockbridge from two opponents. His final appearance of the season was on 17 September at Kingscote Racecourse, where he finished third in the Kingscote Stakes over three miles.

=== 1812: five-year-old season ===
Hephestion remained in training as a five-year-old but failed to win in four races. At the Maddington Club meeting at Stockbridge in May he was beaten by Ringdove in a 50 guinea match race and then finished third of the four runners behind Romeo in the four-mile Maddington Stakes. In the following month he finished last of three behind Ringdove in a claiming race at the Bibury meeting. Hephestion ended his racing career at Kingscote in September, winning the first heat of a two-mile handicap but finishing second in the next two heats behind Topsy-Turvy.

Hephestion disappears from the records after his defeat at Kingscote. He does not appear on any lists of stallions and has no offspring mentioned in the General Stud Book.

== Pedigree ==
Pedigree of Hephestion (GB), bay stallion, 1807
Sire Alexander (GB) 1782	Eclipse; 1764	Marske	Squirt
Sire Alexander (GB) 1782	Eclipse; 1764	Marske	The Ruby Mare
Sire Alexander (GB) 1782	Eclipse; 1764	Spilletta	Regulus
Sire Alexander (GB) 1782	Eclipse; 1764	Spilletta	Mother Western
Sire Alexander (GB) 1782	Grecian Princess; 1770	Williams' Forester	Croft's Forester
Sire Alexander (GB) 1782	Grecian Princess; 1770	Williams' Forester	Looby mare
Sire Alexander (GB) 1782	Grecian Princess; 1770	Coalition colt mare	Coalition colt
Sire Alexander (GB) 1782	Grecian Princess; 1770	Coalition colt mare	Bustard mare
Dam Olivia (GB) 1786	Justice; 1774	Herod	Tartar
Dam Olivia (GB) 1786	Justice; 1774	Herod	Cypron
Dam Olivia (GB) 1786	Justice; 1774	Curiosity	Snap
Dam Olivia (GB) 1786	Justice; 1774	Curiosity	Regulus mare (1749)*
Dam Olivia (GB) 1786	Cypher; 1772	Squirrel	Traveller
Dam Olivia (GB) 1786	Cypher; 1772	Squirrel	Grey Bloody Buttocks
Dam Olivia (GB) 1786	Cypher; 1772	Regulus mare (1749)*	Regulus
Dam Olivia (GB) 1786	Cypher; 1772	Regulus mare (1749)*	Childers mare (Family:3-b)

* Hephestion is inbred 4D × 3D to the mare Regulus mare, meaning that she appears fourth generation and third generation on the dam side of his pedigree.
