= Ukrainian Riding Horse =

Ukrainian breed of warmblood sport horse

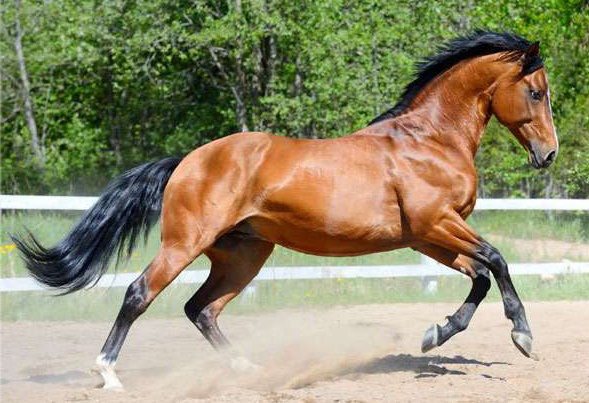
- Conservation status: FAO (2007): not at risk; DAD-IS (2019): at risk
- Other names: Ukrainian: украї́нський верхови́й кінь; Ukrayínskyy Verkhovýy Kin; Ukrainian: украї́нська верхова́; Ukrayínska Verkhová; Ukrainian Saddle Horse
- Country of origin: Ukraine
- Distribution: throughout the country
- Use: dressage; show jumping; three-day eventing; recreational riding

Traits
- Height: Male: average: 165 cm; Female: average: 160 cm
- Colour: dark colours

The Ukrainian Riding Horse (Ukrainian: украї́нський верхови́й кінь) or Ukrainian Saddle Horse is a modern Ukrainian breed of warmblood sport horse. Breeding began in the years after the Second World War at the stud farm of Dnipropetrovsk in central Ukraine – at that time in the USSR – and later expanded to three other state stud farms. It derives from cross-breeding of Hanoverian, Thoroughbred and Trakehner stallions with local mares or with Hungarian Furioso, Gidran Arab or Nonius mares. It incorporates the bloodlines of the Orlov-Rostopchin or Russian Saddle Horse. It was bred to compete in show jumping, three-day eventing and dressage, but is also suitable as a general riding horse.

== History ==
Breeding of the Ukrainian Saddle Horse began in the years after the Second World War at the stud farm of Dnipropetrovsk, in Dnipropetrovsk Oblast in central Ukraine, which at that time was part of the Soviet Union. Breeding was based principally on cross-breeding of Hanoverian, Thoroughbred and Trakehner stallions with mares of local or of Hungarian Furioso, Gidran Arab or Nonius stock, but also incorporated the bloodlines of the Orlov-Rostopchin or Russian Saddle Horse.

Breeding expanded to three other state stud farms: the Oleksandriysky stud at Likarivka in Oleksandriia Raion of Kirovohrad Oblast in central Ukraine: the Provalsky stud at Provallya in Sverdlovsk Raion of Luhansk Oblast in the easternmost part of Ukraine; and the Skadovsky stud at Bilozerka in Kherson Oblast in the south of the country. When these were closed, breeding continued at Dnipropetrovsk, and some horses were moved to the historic Derkulsky Stud at Danilivka, in Bilovodsk Raion of Luhansk Oblast, and to the Yagilnytsky Stud at Yahilnytsia in Chortkiv Raion of Ternopil Oblast in the western part of the country. From 1975 breeding was also carried out at the Lozivsky stud farm at Kinne, in Lozivsky Raion of Kharkiv Oblast in eastern Ukraine.

There are seven lines within the breed, of which the Bespechny is closest to the Orlov-Rostopchin breed.

A stud-book was begun in 1971. The breed received the official approval of the State Committee for Food and Procurement of the Council of Ministers of the USSR in 1990, not long before the break-up of the Soviet Union and the independence of Ukraine.

In 2004 there were 1393 horses registered, distributed among 5 state stud farms and 20 breeders in 13 of the oblasts of Ukraine; of these, 84 were stallions. This represented about 23% of the total purebred horse population of the country, and was slightly lower than the numbers of the Russian Trotter, the most numerous breed.

== Characteristics ==
The Ukrainian Riding Horse is muscular and solidly built, with high withers, a broad deep chest, a long straight back, a long sloping croup and strong legs well set on. The head is well proportioned, with a straight profile.

== Use ==
The Ukrainian Riding Horse has been bred to compete in show jumping, three-day eventing and dressage. It is also suitable as a general riding horse.
