= Zinc (horse) =

British-bred Thoroughbred racehorse

- Sire: Woful
- Grandsire: Waxy
- Dam: Zaida
- Damsire: Sir Peter Teazle
- Sex: Mare
- Foaled: 1820
- Country: United Kingdom of Great Britain and Ireland
- Colour: Brown
- Breeder: George FitzRoy, 4th Duke of Grafton
- Owner: Duke of Grafton
- Trainer: Robert Robson
- Record: 12:5-4-2
- Earnings: £3,321

Major wins
- 1000 Guineas (1823); Epsom Oaks (1823); Newmarket Subscription race (1823, 1824); Match against Palais Royal

Zinc (1820–1840) was a British Thoroughbred racehorse and broodmare, which in 1818 became the third filly to win both the 1000 Guineas at Newmarket Racecourse and the Oaks at Epsom Downs Racecourse. As a three-year-old in 1823 she won three of her five starts, with her defeats coming against the classic-winning colts Nicolo and Emilius. She won both her races in 1824 but failed to win as a five-year-old in 1825 and was retired from racing.

== Background ==
Zinc was a brown mare bred by her owner George FitzRoy, 4th Duke of Grafton at his stud at Euston Hall in Suffolk. Her dam Zaida had been bought by the Duke as a broodmare and proved to be highly successful: in addition to Zinc she produced the 1000 Guineas winner Zeal who in turn produced the filly Arab who won the same race in 1827. Her sire Woful was a brother of the Derby winners Whalebone and Whisker. He was also a successful stallion, siring the classic winners Arab, Theodore and Augusta (Epsom Oaks) before being exported to Prussia in 1832. Grafton sent the filly to be trained at Newmarket by Robert Robson, the so-called "Emperor of Trainers".

== Racing career ==
=== 1823: three-year-old season ===
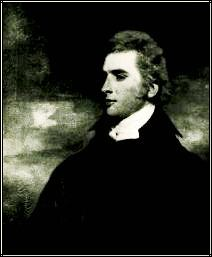
The Duke of Grafton, who bred and owned Zinc

Zinc made her first appearance at the Newmarket Second Spring meeting on 1 May 1823 when she contested the 1000 Guineas over the Ditch Mile course. Despite its name, the race carried a prize of 800 guineas and attracted a field of five fillies. Zinc started the 4/6 favourite and won by half a length from Mr Wyndham's filly Spermaceti, who had won the more valuable Riddlesworth Stakes at the previous Newmarket meeting. Her victory was the fifth successive 1000 Guineas win for the Duke of Grafton and gave her jockey Frank Buckle the fifth of his six wins in the race. On the following day Zinc was matched against colts for the first time in the Newmarket Stakes over the same course and distance and finished second, a length behind the 2000 Guineas winner Nicolo.

On 30 May Zinc was moved up in distance to contest the Oaks Stakes over one and a half miles at Epsom. She was made the even-money favourite for the race which carried a first prize of 2,050 guineas. Buckle sent the filly into the lead from the start and despite setting a slow pace she was never headed and held the late challenge of the Duke of Richmond's grey filly Dandizette "in grand style" to win her second classic by nearly three lengths. The Oaks was the only occasion on which Zinc raced away from Newmarket.

Zinc returned to Newmarket for the "First October" meeting, which despite its name began on 29 September. On that day she ran in the Grand Duke Michael Stakes, a 1,250 guinea race for three-year-olds over ten furlongs. She started the 10/1 outsider of the four runners and finished second to the Derby winner Emilius, beating both Nicolo and Spermaceti. At the Second October meeting two weeks later, Zinc ended her season with a win as she again beat Spermaceti and Nicolo in the first year of a £250 Subscription race over ten furlongs.

=== 1824: four-year-old season ===
After a year off the course, Zinc returned to action at the Newmarket Second October meeting in 1824. On the first day of the meeting she won 40 guineas for her owner when her opponent, a colt named Don Carlos was withdrawn from a scheduled match race over the Ditch Mile course. A day later, Zinc started 5/4 favourite for the second year of the £250 Subscription race over the two-mile "Ditch In" course and won from the colts Zealot, Premium and Oscar. At the Newmarket Houghton meeting on 4 November ran a match race in which she was required to carry nine pounds more than Lord Exeter's four-year-old filly Palais Royal. Zinc defeated her opponent over the Ditch Mile to claim a prize of £100.

=== 1825: five-year-old season ===
Zinc's first appearance in her final season of competition came on the opening day of the Second Spring meeting when she started favourite for a four-runner Sweepstakes over the Ditch Mile. She finished either third or fourth behind the Duke of Grafton's mare Posthuma: at the time it was common for the racecourse judge to place only the first two finishers.

Zinc did not race again until the autumn. At the first October meeting she finished third behind Stumps and Spermaceti in the Trial Stakes. Two days later she was placed third again behind Mr Bloss's filly Double Entendre in a King's Plate over the three and a half mile Round Course. At the Second October meeting she was withdrawn from an engagement in an Oatlands Stakes and then ran second to Double Entendre in a ten furlong handicap race, conceding four pounds to the winner. Zinc's final race came on the opening day of the Houghton meeting when she contested the third year of the £250 Subscription race over the four-mile Beacon Course. She started 4/7 favourite but was beaten by her only opponent, a mare named Black Daphne.

== Stud career ==
Zinc was retired to become a broodmare at the Duke of Grafton's stud. Her descendants had some success in the nineteenth century and included The Moor (Trial Stakes), Uhlan (Doncaster Cup) and Matutina (Preis der Diana). Zinc died in 1840.

== Pedigree ==
Pedigree of Zinc (GB), brown mare, 1820
Sire Woful (GB) 1809	Waxy; 1790	Pot-8-Os	Eclipse
Sire Woful (GB) 1809	Waxy; 1790	Pot-8-Os	Sportsmistress
Sire Woful (GB) 1809	Waxy; 1790	Maria	Herod
Sire Woful (GB) 1809	Waxy; 1790	Maria	Lisette
Sire Woful (GB) 1809	Penelope; 1798	Trumpator	Conductor
Sire Woful (GB) 1809	Penelope; 1798	Trumpator	Brunette
Sire Woful (GB) 1809	Penelope; 1798	Prunella	Highflyer
Sire Woful (GB) 1809	Penelope; 1798	Prunella	Promise
Dam Zaida (GB) 1806	Sir Peter Teazle; 1784	Highflyer	Herod
Dam Zaida (GB) 1806	Sir Peter Teazle; 1784	Highflyer	Rachel
Dam Zaida (GB) 1806	Sir Peter Teazle; 1784	Papillon	Snap
Dam Zaida (GB) 1806	Sir Peter Teazle; 1784	Papillon	Miss Cleveland
Dam Zaida (GB) 1806	Alexina; 1788	King Fergus	Eclipse
Dam Zaida (GB) 1806	Alexina; 1788	King Fergus	Creeping Polly
Dam Zaida (GB) 1806	Alexina; 1788	Lardella	Young Marske
Dam Zaida (GB) 1806	Alexina; 1788	Lardella	Hutton's Cade mare (Family: 25)

- Zinc's pedigree contained a large amount of inbreeding. She was inbred 3×4 to Highflyer, meaning that this stallion appears in both the third and fourth generations of her pedigree. She was also inbred 4×4 to both Eclipse and Herod.
