= Arab (horse) =

British-bred Thoroughbred racehorse

- Sire: Woful
- Grandsire: Waxy
- Dam: Zeal
- Damsire: Partisan
- Sex: Mare
- Foaled: 1824
- Country: United Kingdom
- Colour: Brown
- Breeder: George FitzRoy, 4th Duke of Grafton
- Owner: Duke of Grafton
- Trainer: Robert Robson
- Record: 3:1-1-0

Major wins
- 1000 Guineas (1827)

Arab (1824–1841) was a British Thoroughbred racehorse and broodmare. In a brief racing career, the filly ran three times with her only success coming in the classic 1000 Guineas at Newmarket in 1827.

== Background ==
Arab was a brown mare bred by her owner George FitzRoy, 4th Duke of Grafton at his stud at Euston Hall in Suffolk. She was the first foal of her dam Zeal who won the 1000 Guineas in 1821: Zeal was a half-sister of Zinc who won both the 1000 Guineas and Oaks in 1823. Her sire Woful was a brother of the Derby winners Whalebone and Whisker. He was also a successful stallion, siring the classic winners Zinc and Augusta (Epsom Oaks) before being exported to Prussia in 1832. Grafton sent the filly to be trained at Newmarket by Robert Robson, the so-called "Emperor of Trainers".

== Racing career ==
=== 1827: three-year-old season ===
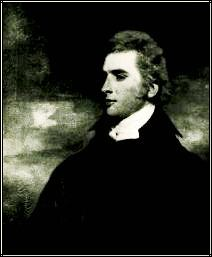
The Duke of Grafton, who bred and owned Arab

Arab began her racing career on 1 May 1827 at Newmarket's Second Spring meeting. She ran in a Sweepstakes over the Ditch Mile course restricted to the produce of mares which had not produced a winner before 25 May 1825. The only filly in a field of four runners, Arab was not strongly supported in the betting but finished second to a colt named Pontiff, beaten two lengths. Two days later, over the same course and distance, Arab started the 8/1 (or 10/1) third favourite for the 1000 Guineas Stakes which despite its name carried a prize of 1,400 guineas. Lord Exeter's filly Marinella was made favourite ahead of Monody who was owned, like Arab, by the Duke of Grafton. The race produced a close finish between the two Grafton runners, with Arab prevailing by a head over her better fancied stable companion. Arab's win was the eighth in the race for the Duke of Grafton, a ninth for Robert Robson and a sixth for her jockey Frank Buckle.

Arab did not run in the Oaks Stakes, and made her next appearance at Ascot Racecourse on 12 June where she competed in a Sweepstakes for three-year-old fillies over the New Mile course. She was not one of the favourites and finished third of the six runners behind Mr Payne's roan filly Serenade, the winner of the Newmarket Stakes. This race concluded Arab's racing career.

== Stud record ==
After her racing career, Arab was exported to France where she produced Miss Tandem, who in turn foaled the Prix du Jockey Club winner Renonce. Arab was barren for many years after 1832, producing a half-Arabian foal in 1837 and her last foal in 1840. She died in 1841 under the ownership of Mr. de Mallevoue.

== Pedigree ==
Pedigree of Arab (GB), brown mare, 1824
Sire Woful (GB) 1809	Waxy; 1790	Potoooooooo	Eclipse
Sire Woful (GB) 1809	Waxy; 1790	Potoooooooo	Sportsmistress
Sire Woful (GB) 1809	Waxy; 1790	Maria	Herod
Sire Woful (GB) 1809	Waxy; 1790	Maria	Lisette
Sire Woful (GB) 1809	Penelope; 1798	Trumpator	Conductor
Sire Woful (GB) 1809	Penelope; 1798	Trumpator	Brunette
Sire Woful (GB) 1809	Penelope; 1798	Prunella	Highflyer
Sire Woful (GB) 1809	Penelope; 1798	Prunella	Promise
Dam Zeal (GB) 1818	Partisan; 1811	Walton	Sir Peter Teazle
Dam Zeal (GB) 1818	Partisan; 1811	Walton	Arethusa
Dam Zeal (GB) 1818	Partisan; 1811	Parasol	Potoooooooo
Dam Zeal (GB) 1818	Partisan; 1811	Parasol	Prunella
Dam Zeal (GB) 1818	Zaida; 1806	Sir Peter Teazle	Highflyer
Dam Zeal (GB) 1818	Zaida; 1806	Sir Peter Teazle	Papillon
Dam Zeal (GB) 1818	Zaida; 1806	Alexina	King Fergus
Dam Zeal (GB) 1818	Zaida; 1806	Alexina	Lardella (Family: 25)

- Arab's pedigree contained a large amount of inbreeding. She was inbred 3x4 to Sir Peter Teazle and Potoooooooo, meaning that these stallions appears in both the third and fourth generations of her pedigree. She was also inbred 4x4 to Highflyer.
