= Nike (horse) =

British Thoroughbred racehorse

- Sire: Alexander
- Grandsire: Eclipse
- Dam: Nimble
- Damsire: Florizel
- Sex: Mare
- Foaled: 1794
- Country: Kingdom of Great Britain
- Colour: Bay
- Breeder: 1st Earl Grosvenor
- Owner: 1st Earl Grosvenor
- Record: 5: 3-0-0

Major wins
- Woodcot Stakes (1796); Oaks Stakes (1797)

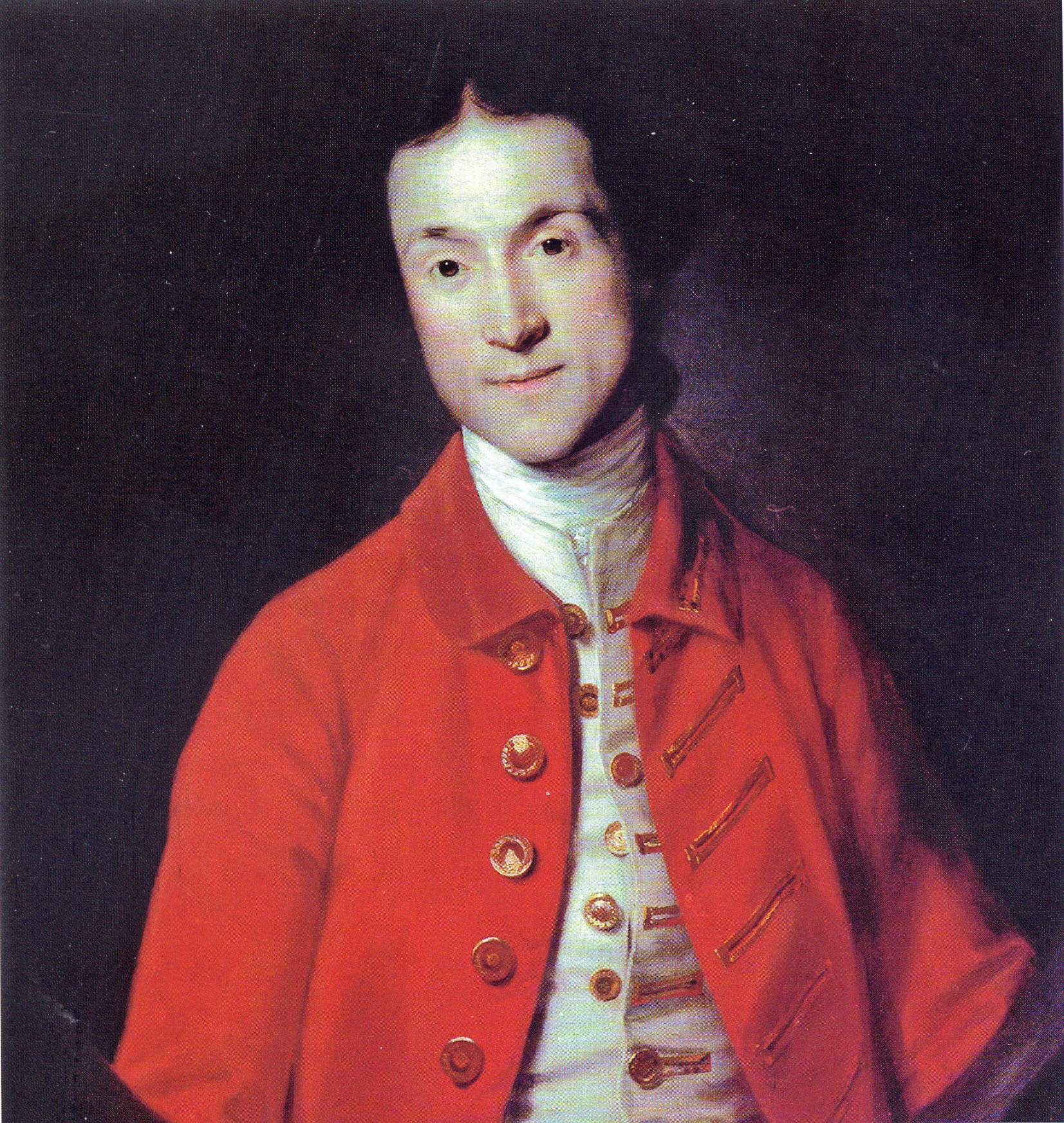
Nike's owner the 1st Earl Grosvenor

Nike (often stylised Niké; foaled 1794) was a British Thoroughbred racehorse. She won three of her five starts, including the Oaks Stakes in 1797. She was owned by Richard Grosvenor, 1st Earl Grosvenor, and later became a broodmare, with three of her foals placing in Classic races.

== Background ==
Nike was a bay filly bred by Richard Grosvenor, 1st Earl Grosvenor, and was foaled in 1794. She was sired by Alexander, who raced at Newmarket for Grosvenor. Alexander also sired a number of top horses, including 2000 Guineas winner Hephestion and the important Alexander mare. Nike's dam was Nimble, a daughter of Florizel.

== Racing career ==
Nike's first race came in the Woodcot Stakes at Epsom Downs on 14 May 1796, when she beat Peeping Tom and two others. This was her only race as a two-year-old.

She was entered to run in the Bolton Stakes at Newmarket in mid-May 1797, but was withdrawn before the race. She returned to Epsom Downs on 2 June, when she faced four rivals for the Oaks Stakes. Nike, who started as the 15/8 favourite, won the race from Mother Shipton. Rose, who was the second favourite, finished the race in second place. In her only other run of the season she finished unplaced behind winner Stamford in a Sweepstakes of 20 guineas each at Stamford in July. Six horses started the race, but the judge could only place the winner.

In July 1798 she beat Doubtful and Cecilia to win a two-mile Sweepstakes of 10 guineas each at Stamford. At the end of the month she faced Dimple, Mother Shipton and Rose in the Queen's Plate at Chelmsford, which was run in three two-mile heats. In the first heat Nike finished second to Rose, but broke down in the second heat. The race was won by Mother Shipton, who finished last in the first heat. Nike was then retired to stud.

== Stud career ==
As a broodmare at Earl Grosvenor's stud, she produced thirteen foals. They were:

- Minima – a bay colt foaled in 1799 and sired by Trumpator. He won a Sweepstakes of 10 guineas each in one-mile heats at Warwick and the Town Subscription Plate at Shrewsbury (four-mile heats) in 1802.
- Nettle – a bay colt foaled in 1800 and sired by John Bull.
- John Bull colt – a chestnut colt foaled in 1802. He broke his leg during breaking.
- Eaton – a bay stallion foaled in 1804 and sired by Sir Peter Teazle. Won his first three races as a three-year-old in 1807, before finishing third in the St. Leger Stakes. In 1808 he won four races at Newmarket and won a further six in 1809. He won three races in 1810, including the October Newmarket King's Plate. In 1811 he beat Derby winner Pope over three miles and won a King's Plate. Eaton stood as a stallion at Stoke Place near Windsor and was the damsire of Doncaster Cup winner Galopade.
- Dee Nymph – a bay filly foaled in 1806 and sired by Sir Peter Teazle. She raced in the Oaks in 1809, but broke down. She was later sent to Ireland.
- Eccleston – a bay stallion foaled in 1807 and sired by Cesario. He won a race at Newmarket and finished third behind Whalebone in The Derby in 1810. He won seven races in 1811 and two in 1812. In 1813 he won the Garden Stakes at Newmarket and one other race.
- Barrosa – a bay mare foaled in 1808 and sired by Vermin. She won the Produce Sweepstakes at Newmarket and was then runner-up in the 2000 Guineas in 1811. She also won the Portholme Stakes at Huntingdon. She won four races at Newmarket in 1812. She was later a broodmare for Lord Cavendish. Her descendants include dual Arc de Triomphe winner Ksar.
- Mite – a bay mare foaled in 1810 and sired by Meteor. She raced once, unsuccessfully, as the three-year-old. As a broodmare she produced ten foals.
- Zadora – a brown mare foaled in 1811 and sired by Trafalgar. She finished second in the Newmarket Stakes and won a race at Stamford, one at Lichfield and one at Walsall in 1814. In 1815 she won three races, including the Manchester Stakes. After retiring from racing Zadora was a broodmare at the 2nd Earl Grosvenor's stud. Through her daughter Alarm, her direct female line produced Kentucky Oaks winner Liahtunah and Champagne Stakes winner Oiseau.
- Theodosia – a brown filly foaled in 1812 and sired by Trafalgar. She died as a two-year-old.
- Orontes – a bay colt foaled in 1813 and sired by Trafalgar. He won his first three races as a three-year-old. In 1817 he won the Knutsford Gold Cup over three miles and another race at the same meeting, before winning a Sweepstakes at Shrewsbury.
- Tagus – a bay stallion foaled in 1814 and sired by Trafalgar. He won a race at Preston and ran unplaced in the St. Leger in 1817. In 1818 he won the Knutsford Gold Cup and Warwick Gold Cup. In his last race of the season he won the Stand Gold Cup at Lichfield.
- Peruvian colt – a bay colt foaled in 1815 and sired by Peruvian.

== Pedigree ==
Pedigree of Nike, bay mare, 1794
Sire Alexander (GB) ch. 1782	Eclipse (GB) ch. 1764	Markse br. 1750	Squirt
Sire Alexander (GB) ch. 1782	Eclipse (GB) ch. 1764	Markse br. 1750	Blacklegs mare
Sire Alexander (GB) ch. 1782	Eclipse (GB) ch. 1764	Spilletta b. 1749	Regulus*
Sire Alexander (GB) ch. 1782	Eclipse (GB) ch. 1764	Spilletta b. 1749	Mother Western
Sire Alexander (GB) ch. 1782	Grecian Princess (GB); 1770	Williams's Forester ch. 1750	Forester
Sire Alexander (GB) ch. 1782	Grecian Princess (GB); 1770	Williams's Forester ch. 1750	Looby mare
Sire Alexander (GB) ch. 1782	Grecian Princess (GB); 1770	Coalition Colt mare	Coalition Colt
Sire Alexander (GB) ch. 1782	Grecian Princess (GB); 1770	Coalition Colt mare	Bustard mare
Dam Nimble (GB) b. 1784	Florizel (GB) b. 1768	Herod b. 1758	Tartar
Dam Nimble (GB) b. 1784	Florizel (GB) b. 1768	Herod b. 1758	Cypron
Dam Nimble (GB) b. 1784	Florizel (GB) b. 1768	Cygnet mare gr. 1761	Cygnet
Dam Nimble (GB) b. 1784	Florizel (GB) b. 1768	Cygnet mare gr. 1761	Cartouch mare
Dam Nimble (GB) b. 1784	Rantipole (GB) ch. 1769	Blank b. 1740	Godolphin Arabian
Dam Nimble (GB) b. 1784	Rantipole (GB) ch. 1769	Blank b. 1740	Little Hartley Mare
Dam Nimble (GB) b. 1784	Rantipole (GB) ch. 1769	Joan; 1757	Regulus*
Dam Nimble (GB) b. 1784	Rantipole (GB) ch. 1769	Joan; 1757	Silver-tail

Note: b. = Bay, br. = Brown, ch. = Chestnut, gr. = Grey

* Nike was inbred 4x4 to Regulus. This means that the stallion appears twice in the fourth generation of her pedigree.
