= Neva (horse) =

British-bred Thoroughbred racehorse

- Sire: Cervantes
- Grandsire: Don Quixote
- Dam: Mary
- Damsire: Sir Peter Teazle
- Sex: Mare
- Foaled: 1814
- Country: United Kingdom of Great Britain and Ireland
- Colour: Bay
- Owner: George Watson
- Trainer: R. D. Boyce
- Record: 4:2-1-1
- Earnings: £4,567

Major wins
- 1000 Guineas (1817); Epsom Oaks (1817)

Neva (foaled 1814, died after 1837) was a British Thoroughbred racehorse, which in 1817 became the first filly to win both the 1000 Guineas at Newmarket Racecourse and the Oaks at Epsom Downs Racecourse. In a racing career which lasted from April 1817 until May 1818 she ran four times and won twice.

== Background ==
Neva was a bay mare sired by Cervantes out of Mary, a daughter of The Derby winner Sir Peter Teazle and a sister of the Doncaster Cup winner Caleb Quotem. Cervantes was best known as a sire of broodmares: his daughters produced the 2000 Guineas winner Grey Momus and Melbourne, who in turn sired the Triple Crown winner West Australian. Neva was bred by a Mr. Tibbits and raced in the ownership of George Watson.

== Racing career ==
=== 1817: three-year-old season ===
Neva made her first racecourse appearance in the fourth running of the 1000 Guineas at Newmarket on 24 April. The race was run over the Ditch Mile course rather than its modern venue on the Rowley Mile, and despite its name carried a first prize of 2100 guineas. She started the 7/4 favourite and won from Mr. Jones's brown filly Clearwell Lass, with the Duke of Grafton's Trictrac in third.

On 23 May, Neva was made the even money favourite in a field of eleven fillies for the Oaks Stakes. Ridden by Francis Buckle she won from Mr. Lake's bay filly Amabel to take a first prize of 2250 guineas. The two classics were Neva's only races of 1817.

=== 1818: four-year-old season ===
After a break of more than ten months, Neva reappeared at the Newmarket Craven meeting in April 1818. Racing against colts for the first time, she started favourite for the two mile Claret Stakes, but finished third to The Student (the beaten favourite in the 1817 Derby). At the next Newmarket meeting later that month, Neva was scheduled to run a match race at level weights against Lord Foley's colt Young Wizard. Neva failed to appear for the match and her owner was obliged to pay a forfeit of 130 guineas. At Newmarket's Second Spring meeting in May, Neva ran a match over one and a quarter miles against Amabel, in which she carried 121 pounds compared to her opponent's 112. In an even betting race, Amabel reversed the form of the previous year's Oaks to defeat Neva and claim a prize of 200 guineas for Mr Lake.

== Stud career ==
Neva retired and sold as a broodmare to Sir William Milner for whom she produced three foals. She then passed into the ownership of Robert Ridsdale and produced five more foals between 1825 and 1833. She delivered her last recorded foal in 1837 and was sold. Despite being sent to leading stallions such as Catton, Comus, Tramp and Whisker she produced no runners of note.

== Pedigree ==
Pedigree of Neva (GB), bay mare, 1814
Sire Cervantes (GB) 1806	Don Quixote; 1784	Eclipse	Marske
Sire Cervantes (GB) 1806	Don Quixote; 1784	Eclipse	Spilletta
Sire Cervantes (GB) 1806	Don Quixote; 1784	Grecian Princess	Williams Forester
Sire Cervantes (GB) 1806	Don Quixote; 1784	Grecian Princess	Coalition colt mare
Sire Cervantes (GB) 1806	Evelina; 1791	Highflyer	Herod
Sire Cervantes (GB) 1806	Evelina; 1791	Highflyer	Rachel
Sire Cervantes (GB) 1806	Evelina; 1791	Termagant	Tantrum
Sire Cervantes (GB) 1806	Evelina; 1791	Termagant	Cantatrice
Dam Mary (GB) 1803	Sir Peter Teazle; 1784	Highflyer	Herod
Dam Mary (GB) 1803	Sir Peter Teazle; 1784	Highflyer	Rachel
Dam Mary (GB) 1803	Sir Peter Teazle; 1784	Papillon	Snap
Dam Mary (GB) 1803	Sir Peter Teazle; 1784	Papillon	Miss Cleveland
Dam Mary (GB) 1803	Diomed mare 1788	Diomed	Florizel
Dam Mary (GB) 1803	Diomed mare 1788	Diomed	sister to Juno
Dam Mary (GB) 1803	Diomed mare 1788	Desdemona	Marske
Dam Mary (GB) 1803	Diomed mare 1788	Desdemona	Young Hag (Family:5-a)

- Neva was inbred 3x3 to Highflyer, meaning that this stallion appears twice in the third generation of her pedigree. She was also inbred 4x4 to Marske.
