= Kustanai horse =

Breed of horse

Kustanair
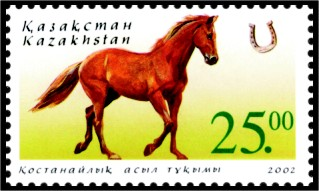
- Other names: Kustanai
- Country of origin: Kazakhstan

The Kustanair (Kazakh: Qostanaı) is a breed of horse developed in Kazakhstan in the former U.S.S.R. in the late 19th and early 20th centuries. They are used mainly for under-saddle and light draft work.

== History ==
The Kustanair was created at collective farms and state-farm studs in the steppes of western Kazakhstan, with most horses located at the Kustanai and Maikulski studs. The main development breeding took place between 1887 and 1951, when the breed was officially recognized. The breed was created by infusing native Kazakh steppe horses with Thoroughbred, Russian Don, Stralet, and Astrakhan (improved Kalmyk) blood. At the beginning the crossbreeding seemed unsuccessful, but with better management of brood mares and the addition of more Thoroughbred blood, the breed was created in the 1920s. In the 1930s breeding was continued with differences in management (including feed, breeding, and keeping styles) that created two distinct types within the breed.

== Breed Characteristics ==
The Kustanair generally stands 15 to 15.1 hands high and the coat can be bay, brown, black, chestnut, gray or roan. The breed has a light head with a straight profile, a muscular neck, and prominent withers. The chest is deep and wide, the shoulder long and sloping, the back long and the croup sloping. The legs are well-muscled and long with clean joints and good hooves. The breed is said to be very tough and hardy, with great endurance and stamina. Some members of the breed have more Thoroughbred characteristics than others.

=== Sub-Types ===
Deliberate differences in management styles at the various state studs produced two subtypes with the Kustanair breed. The first type, kept stabled, given better food, and bred very selectively, were saddle-type horses. The second type, kept in the steppes, herd-bred, and left to forage for much of their food, were a hardier type more suited for light draft work.

== Uses ==
The breed is used mainly for riding and light draft work.

== See also ==
- Kazakh Horse
