= Zeal (horse) =

British-bred Thoroughbred racehorse

- Sire: Partisan
- Grandsire: Walton
- Dam: Zaida
- Damsire: Sir Peter Teazle
- Sex: Mare
- Foaled: 1818
- Country: United Kingdom
- Colour: Bay
- Breeder: George FitzRoy, 4th Duke of Grafton
- Owner: Duke of Grafton
- Trainer: Robert Robson
- Record: 6:4-1-0
- Earnings: £2,835

Major wins
- 1000 Guineas (1821); Port Stakes (1822)

Zeal (foaled 1818) was a British Thoroughbred racehorse and broodmare, which won the eighth running of the classic 1000 Guineas. As a three-year-old in 1821 won she won her first three races at Newmarket Racecourse including the 1000 Guineas but then finished fourth in The Oaks. As a four-year-old she walked over in the valuable Port Stakes but was beaten in her only other race. She later had a successful career as a broodmare.

== Background ==
Zeal was a bay mare bred by her owner George FitzRoy, 4th Duke of Grafton at his stud at Euston Hall in Suffolk. Her dam Zaida had been bought by the Duke as a broodmare and proved to be highly successful: in addition to Zeal she produced the 1000 Guineas and Oaks winner Zinc. Her sire Partisan, another product of Grafton's stud, won seven races at Newmarket before being retired to stud. He was a successful breeding stallion, siring important winners including Mameluke (Epsom Derby), Pindarrie (2000 Guineas), and Cyprian (Oaks Stakes). Grafton sent the filly to be trained at Newmarket by Robert Robson, the so-called "Emperor of Trainers".

== Racing career ==
=== 1821: three-year-old season ===
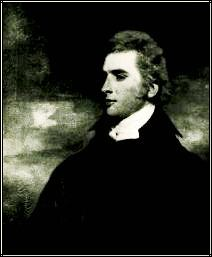
The Duke of Grafton, who bred and owned Zeal

Zeal began her racing career at Newmarket's First Spring meeting in May 1821. On the opening day of the meeting she ran in against three other fillies in a Sweepstakes over the Abington Mile course. Starting the 4/7 favourite, she won by half a length from the Duke of Rutland's unnamed chestnut filly to claim a prize of 1,000 guineas. Three days later, Zeal started 6/4 favourite for the 1,000 Guineas Stakes, which despite its name carried a prize of 900 guineas. The race was run over the Ditch Mile course and Zeal "won easy" from Lord Suffield's filly and four others. On the following afternoon she won a further 400 guineas without having to race as she walked-over in a Sweepstakes over the Abington Mile, her rivals having been withdrawn by their owners.

On 5 June at Epsom Downs Racecourse, Zeal was moved up in distance to contest the Oaks Stakes over one and a half miles. She started a 20/1 outsider, suggesting either that her Newmarket form was lightly regarded, or that she was known to be some way below her best. The latter explanation appears more likely as the filly had been disputing favouritism in the lead-up to the race. She finished fourth of the seven runners behind Lord Exeter's filly Augusta who started favourite.

=== 1822: four-year-old season ===
Zeal made her first appearance as a four-year-old in the Port Stakes at the Newmarket Craven meeting on 12 April. She claimed the first prize of 400 guineas without having to race when the other three entries were withdrawn. At the First Spring meeting two weeks later Zeal ran in a Sweepstakes over five furlongs in which she started favourite but was beaten by her only rival, a filly named Civet. Zeal never raced again and was retired to stud at the end of the season.

== Stud record ==
Zeal was retired to become a broodmare at the Duke of Grafton's stud. In her first season she produced a filly named Arab, sired by Woful, who won the 1000 Guineas in 1827. In 1833 Zeal produced a colt by Saracen named Alumnus who won the Predergast Stakes and the Newmarket St Leger.

== Pedigree ==
Pedigree of Zeal (GB), bay mare, 1818
Sire Partisan (GB) 1811	Walton; 1799	Sir Peter Teazle	Highflyer
Sire Partisan (GB) 1811	Walton; 1799	Sir Peter Teazle	Papillon
Sire Partisan (GB) 1811	Walton; 1799	Arethusa	Dungannon
Sire Partisan (GB) 1811	Walton; 1799	Arethusa	Prophet mare
Sire Partisan (GB) 1811	Parasol; 1800	Pot-8-Os	Eclipse
Sire Partisan (GB) 1811	Parasol; 1800	Pot-8-Os	Sportsmistress
Sire Partisan (GB) 1811	Parasol; 1800	Prunella	Highflyer
Sire Partisan (GB) 1811	Parasol; 1800	Prunella	Promise
Dam Zaida (GB) 1806	Sir Peter Teazle; 1784	Highflyer	Herod
Dam Zaida (GB) 1806	Sir Peter Teazle; 1784	Highflyer	Rachel
Dam Zaida (GB) 1806	Sir Peter Teazle; 1784	Papillon	Snap
Dam Zaida (GB) 1806	Sir Peter Teazle; 1784	Papillon	Miss Cleveland
Dam Zaida (GB) 1806	Alexina; 1788	King Fergus	Eclipse
Dam Zaida (GB) 1806	Alexina; 1788	King Fergus	Creeping Polly
Dam Zaida (GB) 1806	Alexina; 1788	Lardella	Young Marske
Dam Zaida (GB) 1806	Alexina; 1788	Lardella	Hutton's Cade mare (Family: 25)

- Zeal's pedigree contained a large amount of inbreeding. She was inbred 2x3 to Sir Peter Teazle, meaning that this stallion appears in both the second and third generations of her pedigree. She was also inbred 3x4x4 to Highflyer and 4x4 to Eclipse.
