= Queen of Trumps =

British-bred thoroughbred racehorse

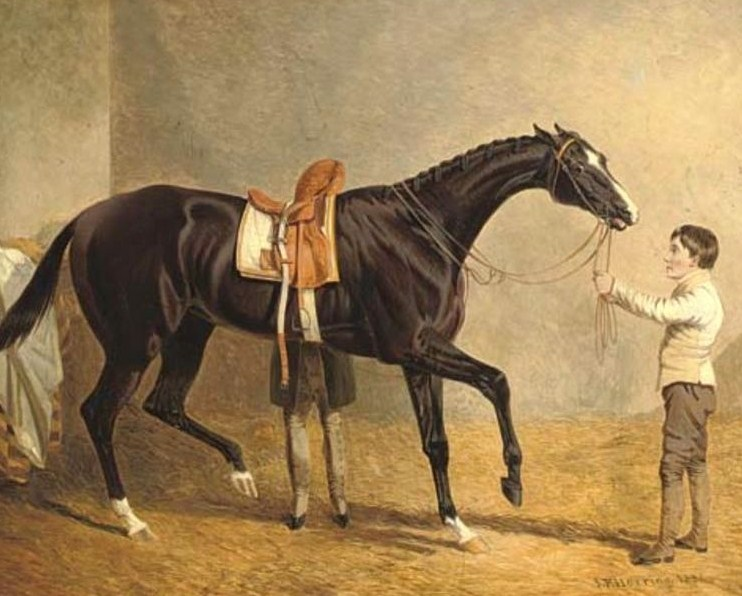
- Queen of Trumps in a stable, with two grooms by John Frederick Herring
- Sire: Velocipede
- Grandsire: Blacklock
- Dam: Princess Royal
- Damsire: Castrel
- Sex: Mare
- Foaled: 1832
- Country: United Kingdom of Great Britain and Ireland
- Colour: Brown
- Breeder: Edward Lloyd-Mostyn
- Owner: Edward Lloyd-Mostyn
- Trainer: John Blenkhorn
- Record: 11: 10-1-0

Major wins
- Holywell Champagne Stakes (1834); Oaks Stakes (1835); Knowsley Dinner Stakes (1835); St Leger Stakes (1835); Chieftain Stakes (1835); Chester Stand Cup (1836); Marquis of Westminster's Plate (1836); Newton Borough Cup (1836)

Queen of Trumps (1832–1843) was a British Thoroughbred racehorse and broodmare best known for winning the classic Oaks and St Leger Stakes in 1835, becoming the first horse to win both races. In a racing career that lasted from October 1834 until October 1836 she won ten of her eleven races. After being successful in her only race as a two-year-old, she defeated the 1000 Guineas winner Preserve in the Oaks on her three-year-old debut. Later that year she started as favourite for the St Leger, and won from a field that included Preserve and The Derby winner Mundig. Queen of Trumps sustained her only defeat a few days later when she was attacked by a dog in the closing stages of the Scarborough Stakes. She was retired to stud after winning all four of her races in 1836, and died in 1843 at the age of eleven. She was described by a contemporary writer as "certainly the most extraordinary mare these our days have seen".

== Background ==
Queen of Trumps was a dark brown mare with a white blaze and three white socks, bred by her owner Edward Lloyd-Mostyn. She was sired by Velocipede, a highly regarded but injury-prone racehorse who also sired the Derby winner Amato and the 2000 Guineas winner Meteor.

She was the sixth and probably the last foal produced by Mostyn's mare Princess Royal, a daughter of Castrel. Princess Royal was a successful racehorse, winning eight races in northern England as a three-year-old in 1821. Queen of Trumps was ridden in all of her races by Thomas "Tommy" Lye.

== Racing career ==
=== 1834: two-year-old season ===
Queen of Trumps began her racing career at Holywell Hunt meeting in Flintshire, North Wales on 14 October 1834. Racing in the Champagne Stakes over half a mile she won from three opponents meaning that Mostyn, under the conditions of the race, was obliged to present two dozen bottles of champagne to the members of the local racing club.

=== 1835: three-year-old season ===
Queen of Trumps did not run as a three-year-old until 5 June when she was one of ten fillies to contest the fifty-seventh running of the Oaks Stakes at Epsom Downs Racecourse. The odds-on favourite for the race was Preserve, the undefeated winner of the 1000 Guineas, but Queen of Trumps, despite her lack of public form and looking less than fully fit, was well-supported and went off the 7/1 second choice in the betting. The race began after one false start and was run at a moderately strong pace. By the time the runners entered the straight, many of them were already struggling, and inside the final quarter-mile the first and second favourites broke clear of the opposition and appeared to have the race between them. Approaching the final furlong Queen of Trumps "shot forward", left Preserve well behind, and "cantered" to victory. The New Sporting Magazine praised Tommy Lye for his steady riding performance, and opined that he had done only enough to win the race, leaving the filly's true ability undisclosed.

The Oaks winner's next appearance was at Liverpool Racecourse on 17 July. She started favourite for the Knowsley Dinner Stakes and won from the colts Hectic, Equator and Conductor.

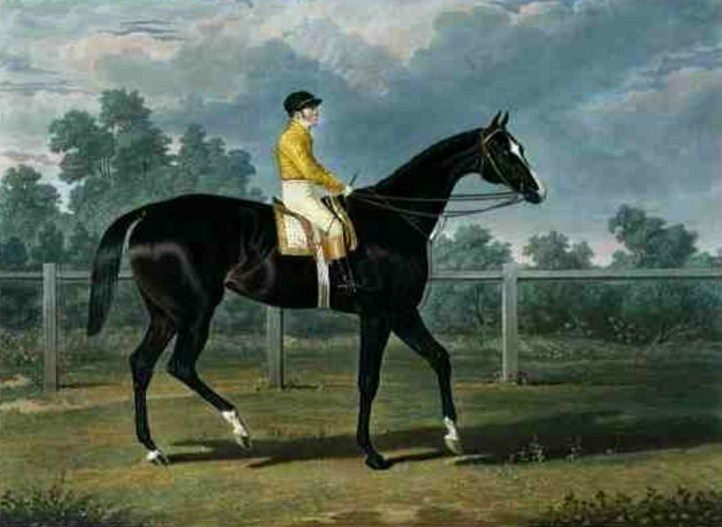
'Queen of Trumps', Won the Oaks Stakes (the Winner of the Great St. Leger Stakes at Doncaster, 1835) at Epsom, 1835 by John Frederick Herring

In the St Leger Stakes at Doncaster Racecourse in September, Queen of Trumps met Preserve again, along with Mundig and Ascot, colts who had finished first and second in the Derby. The meeting was held in generally fine weather and attracted a large crowd, with much interest being created by the attendance of the heir to the throne, Princess Victoria. Despite rumours that she would be "made safe" (prevented from winning) Queen of Trumps started favourite ahead of Hornsea, the Derby winner's reportedly superior stable companion. The favourite was not among the early front-runners, but Lye moved steadily forward and positioned her just behind the leaders in the straight. Approaching the final furlong the filly accelerated sharply, settled the race in two or three strides and won "without the semblance of an effort" by a length from Hornsea and Sheet Anchor, with Preserve in fourth place. She became the first Oaks winner to add a success in the St Leger, and was the only winner of Epsom classic to take the race between Champion in 1800 and Surplice in 1848.

Three days later at the same course, Queen of Trumps was made 1/10 favourite for the one-mile Scarborough Stakes, despite carrying a seven pound weight penalty for her classic victory. She was given a "tender" ride by Lye, for her delicate legs were reportedly causing her discomfort, but looked likely to win until, inside the final furlong, a large bulldog rushed out from the crowd. Lye managed to avoid the attacking animal, but Queen of Trumps lost ground and momentum and was beaten by half a head by the colt Ainderby. Later the same afternoon, Queen of Trumps was allowed to walk over for a sweepstakes over the St Leger course and distance.

Queen of Trumps returned to Holywell for her final appearance of the season. On 13 October she walked over for the Chieftain Stakes over the Mostyn mile course after the two other entries were withdrawn.

=== 1836: four-year-old season ===
Queen of Trumps began her third and final season with two appearances at Chester Racecourse in early May. She won the Stand Cup beating the five-year-old Red Rover and then walked over for the Marquis of Westminster's Plate a day later. In June the filly appeared at Newton-le-Willows Racecourse and won the Borough Cup over two miles, beating Mr Ramsay's horse Vestment at odds of 1/6. Queen of Trumps' racing career ended as it had begun with a race at the Holywell Hunt in October when she defeated Lord Westminster's four-year-old Oswald in a two-mile Post Sweepstakes.

== Stud career ==
Queen of Trumps was retired from racing to become a broodmare at her owner's stud. She produced only four foals:

- 1838 Prince Caradoc, a bay colt sired by The Colonel, exported to Austria
- 1840 Earl of Richmond, bay colt by Touchstone
- 1841 Princess Alice, bay filly by Liverpool
- 1842 The Black Prince, black colt by Touchstone

In 1843 Queen of Trumps died giving birth to a foal by Revolution.

Princess Alice had some success as a broodmare and was the direct ancestor of many winners including two Irish classic winners and the leading Canadian stallion Chop Chop.

== Pedigree ==
Pedigree of Queen of Trumps, brown mare, 1832
Sire Velocipede (GB) 1825	Blacklock (GB); 1814	Whitelock	Hambletonian
Sire Velocipede (GB) 1825	Blacklock (GB); 1814	Whitelock	Rosalind
Sire Velocipede (GB) 1825	Blacklock (GB); 1814	Coriander mare	Coriander
Sire Velocipede (GB) 1825	Blacklock (GB); 1814	Coriander mare	Wildgoose
Sire Velocipede (GB) 1825	Juniper mare (GB); 1817	Juniper	Whiskey
Sire Velocipede (GB) 1825	Juniper mare (GB); 1817	Juniper	Jenny Spinner
Sire Velocipede (GB) 1825	Juniper mare (GB); 1817	Sorcerer mare	Sorcerer
Sire Velocipede (GB) 1825	Juniper mare (GB); 1817	Sorcerer mare	Virgin
Dam Princess Royal (GB) 1818	Castrel (GB); 1801	Buzzard	Woodpecker
Dam Princess Royal (GB) 1818	Castrel (GB); 1801	Buzzard	Misfortune
Dam Princess Royal (GB) 1818	Castrel (GB); 1801	Alexander mare	Alexander
Dam Princess Royal (GB) 1818	Castrel (GB); 1801	Alexander mare	Highflyer mare
Dam Princess Royal (GB) 1818	Queen of Diamonds (GB); 1809	Diamond	Highflyer
Dam Princess Royal (GB) 1818	Queen of Diamonds (GB); 1809	Diamond	Matchem mare
Dam Princess Royal (GB) 1818	Queen of Diamonds (GB); 1809	Sir Peter mare	Sir Peter Teazle
Dam Princess Royal (GB) 1818	Queen of Diamonds (GB); 1809	Sir Peter mare	Lucy (Family 2-m)
