= 1816 in sports =

1816 in sports describes the year's events in world sport.

== Boxing ==
Events

- 7 November — Tom Cribb retains his English championship, defeating an unnamed opponent in a contest that lasted 20 minutes.

== Cricket ==
Events

- Formation of the Manchester Cricket Club which takes part in a number of first-class matches until Lancashire CCC is established in 1864. Manchester is representative of Lancashire as a county in the same way that Sheffield Cricket Club and Nottingham Cricket Club represent Yorkshire and Nottinghamshire.
- The issue of roundarm bowling is already controversial enough for MCC to amend the Laws of Cricket to prohibit it:

The ball must be bowled (not thrown or jerked), and be delivered underhand, with the hand below the elbow. But if the ball be jerked, or the arm extended from the body horizontally, and any part of the hand be uppermost, or the hand horizontally extended when the ball is delivered, the Umpires shall call "No Ball".

England

- Most runs – William Lambert 363 (HS 74)
- Most wickets – Thomas Howard 30 (BB 5–?)

== Horse racing ==
England

- 1,000 Guineas Stakes – Rhoda
- 2,000 Guineas Stakes – Nectar
- The Derby – Prince Leopold
- The Oaks – Landscape
- St. Leger Stakes – The Duchess
