= Sam Barnard (jockey) =

Personal information
- Born: 1776 or 1777
- Died: 29 June 1846 (aged 69) Newmarket, Suffolk, England
- Occupation: Jockey

Horse racing career
- Sport: Horse racing

Major racing wins
- 1000 Guineas Stakes (1816); 2000 Guineas Stakes (1811); Oaks Stakes (1814)

Significant horses
- Medora, Rhoda, Trophonius
- Updated on 28 January 2022

Sam Barnard (c. 1776 – 29 June 1846) was a three times Classic-winning jockey.

In 1811, he won the third running of the 2000 Guineas on the black colt, Trophonius winning "easy" at odds of 5/2. He also won the third running of the 1000 Guineas in 1816 on the prolific filly Rhoda. She would become the most successful horse in Britain of her day, winning 21 of her 45 races.

His other Classic victory came in the Oaks of 1814, which he won on Medora. He also won the Wokingham Stakes at Royal Ascot in 1823, though by the end of the century he had become a "less known member of the early jockeys."

His career was ended after 76 winners when his horse fell with him at Ascot. As a result of the fall, he was totally blinded. He died in Newmarket on 29 June 1846.

== Major wins ==
(United Kingdom) Great Britain

- 1000 Guineas Stakes - Rhoda (1816)
- 2000 Guineas Stakes - Trophonius (1811)
- Oaks Stakes - Medora (1814)

== See also ==
- List of jockeys
