= 1835 in sports =

1835 in sports describes the year's events in world sport.

== Boxing ==
Events

- Still trying to resolve the English Championship title issue, James Burke has two scheduled fights but neither can take place. First, Harry Preston refuses to fight him; and then Young Langan is arrested on the eve of his fight for assaulting a police officer.
- 21 July — in a non-title bout between two future contenders, Ben Caunt is disqualified for an alleged foul, striking William "Bendigo" Thompson when Thompson is sitting in his corner.

== Cricket ==
Events

- Powerless to prevent the use of roundarm bowling, MCC finally amends the Laws of Cricket to make it legal. The relevant part of the Laws states:

if the hand be above the shoulder in the delivery, the umpire must call "No Ball".

- Bowlers’ hands now go above the shoulder and the 1835 Law must be reinforced in 1845 by removing benefit of the doubt from the bowler in the matter of his hand's height when delivering the ball.
- The Laws are also changed to enforce a compulsory follow on if a team is 100 runs behind on first innings.

England

- Most runs – James Cobbett 156 @ 15.60 (HS 31*)
- Most wickets – William Lillywhite 42 (BB 7–?)

== Horse racing ==
England

- 1,000 Guineas Stakes – Preserve
- 2,000 Guineas Stakes – Ibrahim
- The Derby – Mündig
- The Oaks – Queen of Trumps
- St. Leger Stakes – Queen of Trumps

== Rowing ==
The Boat Race

- The Oxford and Cambridge Boat Race is not held this year
