= Meteor (horse) =

Racehorse

- Sire: Velocipede
- Grandsire: Blacklock
- Dam: Dido
- Damsire: Whisker
- Sex: Stallion
- Foaled: 1839
- Country: Great Britain
- Colour: Chestnut
- Owner: John Bowes
- Trainer: John Scott
- Record: 2: 1-0-0
- Earnings: £1,500

Major wins
- 2000 Guineas Stakes (1842)

Meteor (foaled 1839) was a British Thoroughbred racehorse who won the 2000 Guineas Stakes in 1842. He was owned by John Bowes and trained by John Scott.

== Background ==
Meteor was a chestnut colt foaled in 1839. He was sired by York Gold Cup and Liverpool Cup winner Velocipede, who sired a number of top runners including Epsom Derby winner Amato. Meteor's dam, Dido, was a daughter of Derby winner Whisker. He grew to stand 15 hands and 3 inches high.

== Racing career ==
Meteor stated as the 6/4 favourite for the 2000 Guineas Stakes at Newmarket on 26 April 1842. Ridden by William Scott, Meteor won the race by half a length from Wiseacre. Misdeal finished in third with Archy in fourth place of the eight runners. In July at Goodwood he finished unplaced behind Misdeal in the Racing Stakes over a mile, after starting as 6/4 favourite. He was kept in training as a four-year-old, but was never fit enough to race. These two races were his only appearances and he earned £1,500.

== Stud career ==
Meteor was a stallion at Catterick in Yorkshire. He stood for a fee of five guineas and five shillings for the groom. He died sometime after 1861 (when he appeared for sale).

== Pedigree ==
Pedigree of Meteor, chestnut stallion, 1839
Sire Velocipede (GB) ch. 1825	Blacklock (GB) b. 1814	Whitelock b. 1803	Hambletonian
Sire Velocipede (GB) ch. 1825	Blacklock (GB) b. 1814	Whitelock b. 1803	Rosalind*#
Sire Velocipede (GB) ch. 1825	Blacklock (GB) b. 1814	Coriander mare 1799	Coriander*#
Sire Velocipede (GB) ch. 1825	Blacklock (GB) b. 1814	Coriander mare 1799	Wildgoose
Sire Velocipede (GB) ch. 1825	Juniper mare (GB); 1817	Juniper ch. 1805	Whiskey
Sire Velocipede (GB) ch. 1825	Juniper mare (GB); 1817	Juniper ch. 1805	Jenny Spinner
Sire Velocipede (GB) ch. 1825	Juniper mare (GB); 1817	Sorcerer mare 1810	Sorcerer^
Sire Velocipede (GB) ch. 1825	Juniper mare (GB); 1817	Sorcerer mare 1810	Virgin^
Dam Dido (GB) 1830	Whisker (GB) b. 1812	Waxy; 1790	Potoooooooo*^#
Dam Dido (GB) 1830	Whisker (GB) b. 1812	Waxy; 1790	Maria
Dam Dido (GB) 1830	Whisker (GB) b. 1812	Penelope; 1798	Trumpator*^
Dam Dido (GB) 1830	Whisker (GB) b. 1812	Penelope; 1798	Prunella
Dam Dido (GB) 1830	Miss Garforth (GB); 1819	Walton; 1799	Sir Peter Teazle*^
Dam Dido (GB) 1830	Miss Garforth (GB); 1819	Walton; 1799	Arethusa
Dam Dido (GB) 1830	Miss Garforth (GB); 1819	Hyacinthus mare 1806	Hyacinthus#
Dam Dido (GB) 1830	Miss Garforth (GB); 1819	Hyacinthus mare 1806	Zara

*# Meteor is inbred 4S x 5D to the mare Rosalind, meaning that she appears fourth generation on the sire side of his pedigree and fifth generation (via Hyacinthus)# on the dam side of his pedigree.

*# Meteor is inbred 4S x 5D to the stallion Coriander, meaning that he appears fourth generation on the sire side of his pedigree and fifth generation (via Hyacinthus)# on the dam side of his pedigree.

*^# Meteor is inbred 5S x 4D x 6D to the stallion Potoooooooo, meaning that he appears fifth generation (via Coriander)^ on the sire side of his pedigree and fourth generation and sixth generation (via Hyacinthus)# on the dam side of his pedigree.

*^ Meteor is inbred 5S x 4D to the stallion Trumpator, meaning that he appears fifth generation (via Sorcerer)^ on the sire side of his pedigree and fourth generation on the dam side of his pedigree.

*^ Meteor is inbred 5S x 4D to the stallion Sir Peter Teazle, meaning that he appears fifth generation (via Virgin)^ on the sire side of his pedigree and fourth generation on the dam side of his pedigree.
