= Hambletonian (horse) =

Late 18th century Thoroughbred racehorse

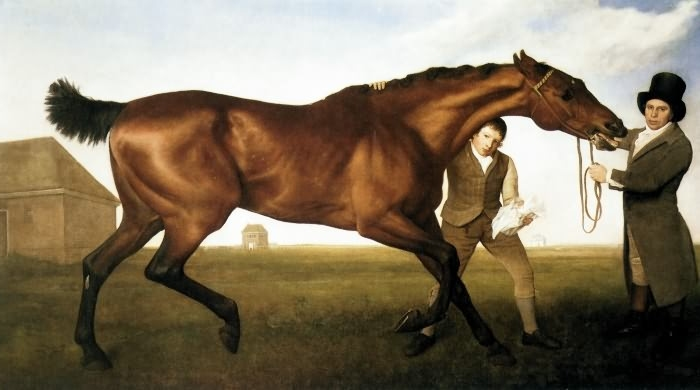
- Hambletonian Rubbing Down by George Stubbs
- Sire: King Fergus
- Grandsire: Eclipse
- Dam: Grey Highflyer
- Damsire: Highflyer
- Sex: Stallion
- Foaled: 1792
- Country: Kingdom of Great Britain
- Colour: Bay
- Breeder: John Hutchinson
- Owner: 1. Sir Charles Turner, 2nd Baronet; 2. Sir Harry Vane-Tempest
- Trainer: Thomas Fields
- Record: 19 starts, 18 wins

Major wins
- St. Leger Stakes (1795); Doncaster Cup (1795, 1796); 4yo Great Subscription Purse (1796); Craven Stakes (1797); 6yo+ Great Subscription Purse (1797, 1800); 5yo Great Subscription Purse (1797)
- Last updated on 25 October 2010

Hambletonian was one of the best Thoroughbred racehorses of the late 18th century, winner of all but one of the races he started in, and later siring several winners. His victories included two Doncaster Cups in the late 1790s and the St. Leger Stakes at Doncaster in 1795.

== Background ==
Hambletonian was a bay colt that was bred by John Hutchinson and foaled in 1792. Hambletonian was sired by King Fergus and was a grandson of two undefeated horses, Eclipse and Highflyer, the latter also being the sire of Hambletonian's dam Grey Highflyer.

== Racing record ==
Hambletonian was named after the historic racing area of Hambleton Hills, which is on the edge of the North York Moors, at the top of Sutton Bank. On 14 May 1794 Hambletonian won his first race there, "A sweepstake of 15 guineas each for three-year-old colts, 8 stone (51 kg), fillies 7 st. 11 lb. (49.5 kg) run over two miles"

In August 1795, Sir Charles Turner at the York races, purchased Hambletonian, Beninghbrough (also by King Fergus) and Oberon from Hutchinson for 3,000 guineas. At the same meeting Hambletonian won two sweepstakes and on 22 September at the Doncaster meeting he won the St. Leger Stakes. The next day Hambletonian won his first Doncaster Cup and Beningbrough was victorious in the Doncaster Stakes.

In 1796 at York Hambletonian lost his only race to The Derby winner, Spread Eagle, after running off the course. At the same meeting he won back £50 from Spread Eagle and two others. Later that year Hambletonian was sold to Sir Henry Vane-Tempest of nearby Wynyard Park, County Durham, for whom he raced until 1800. At the York August meeting he won both the five-year-old and the six-year-old and over Subscription Purses.

Hambletonian did not start during 1798. In a famous match with Mr. Cookson's Diamond over the four-mile Beacon Course at Newmarket on 25 March 1799, Hambletonian, ridden by Francis Buckle, won by a neck in a time of 7 minutes 15 seconds. He is said to have covered 21 feet in a single stride at the finish. Sir Henry had wagered 3,000 guineas on the outcome. The horse was afterwards the subject of the painting, Hambletonian Rubbing Down by the great equine artist, George Stubbs, who was then 75 years old. In 1800 Hambletonian won his only start in the Great Subscription Purse for six-year-olds and over at York.

== Stud record ==
Hambletonian retired to stud in 1801 standing at Seacroft-Hall, near Leeds, then from 1802 to 1808 he stood at Hornsey's stables in Middlethorpe, York for a fee of 10 guineas per mare. In the 1809 season he was at Wynyard, near Stockton-on-Tees, in 1810 and 1811 he returned to Middlethorpe, with his fee rising to 20 and 25 guineas, 1812 and 1813 at Wynyard and finally at Catterick, near Richmond, in 1814, the last year he was advertised, his fee had declined to 15 guineas.

His most notable progeny included:

- Anticipation, won sixteen races, including the Ascot Gold Cup, twice; got excellent hunters
- Camerton, won Goodwood Cup, exported to France in 1818
- Camillus, won Doncaster Cup, successful sire
- Fair Helen (gr f 1808), second dam of the stallion and St Leger winner Margrave
- Goosander, dam of the Epsom Derby winner Sailor and the Oaks Stakes winner Shoveler and taproot mare of Family 6-c
- Lisette, dam of 2,000 Guineas winner Clearwell and a foundation mare of Family 19-b.
- Whitelock, continued the sire line through Blacklock and on to the undefeated St Simon.

Hambletonian died 28 March 1818 and is buried in the grounds of Sir Henry's former home, Wynyard Park, County Durham.

== Sire line tree ==
- Hambletonian
  - Camillus
    - Oiseau
      - Flamingo
      - Rowton
      - Revolution
    - Magistrate
      - Valentine
      - Terror
    - Rhadamanthus
    - Consul
  - Whitelock
    - Blacklock
      - Blue Beard
      - Brutandorf
        - Huntington
        - Physician
        - Somonocodron
        - Gaylad
        - Hetman Platoff
      - Buzzard
        - Bentley
        - Phoenix
        - Jersey
        - Gorhambury
        - Ratan
      - Greylock
      - Streatham
      - Brownlock
      - Cock Robin
      - Crowcatcher
      - Hazard
      - Belzoni
        - Vanguard
      - Laurel
      - Malek
      - Popsy
      - Robin Hood
      - Silverlock
      - Sparkler
      - The Deer
      - Ben Lomond
      - Black Heddon
      - Clinton
      - Jour De Noces
      - Olympus
      - Pelion
      - Poor Fellow
      - Splinter Bar
      - Velocipede
        - Valparaiso
        - Ainderby
        - Hornsea
        - The Skater
        - Blankney
        - Amato
        - Lightfoot
        - Capote
        - Confederate
        - Morgan Rattler
        - Wizard Of The North
        - Knight Of The Whistle
        - Millipede
        - Meteor
        - Amorino
        - Antidote
        - Winesour
        - Joe Lovell
        - Wood Pigeon
        - Lyons
        - King Of Trumps
      - Young Blacklock
        - Whitefoot
        - Magpie
        - Permit
        - Apollo
      - Agitator
      - Bolivar
      - Navarino
      - Niger
      - Robin Redbreast
      - Tamboff
      - Thatcher
      - Tranby
        - I Am Not Aware
      - Voltaire
        - Harpurley
        - Picaroon
        - Charles the Twelfth
        - Jack Sheppard
        - Yorkshire Lad
        - Foxberry
        - Barnton
        - Voltigeur
      - Wodenblock
      - Acis
      - Apuntador
      - Bryan
      - Crescent
      - Belshazzar
        - Manderin
        - Lunatic
        - Vandyke
        - Corporal Trim
        - Florizel
  - Camerton
    - Bay Camerton
  - Anticipation

== Pedigree ==
Pedigree of Hambletonian (GB), bay stallion, 1792
Sire King Fergus (GB) 1775	Eclipse; 1764	Marske	Squirt
Sire King Fergus (GB) 1775	Eclipse; 1764	Marske	The Ruby Mare
Sire King Fergus (GB) 1775	Eclipse; 1764	Spilletta	Regulus*^
Sire King Fergus (GB) 1775	Eclipse; 1764	Spilletta	Mother Western
Sire King Fergus (GB) 1775	Creeping Polly; 1756	Othello	Crab*^
Sire King Fergus (GB) 1775	Creeping Polly; 1756	Othello	Miss Slamerkin
Sire King Fergus (GB) 1775	Creeping Polly; 1756	Fanny	Tartar*
Sire King Fergus (GB) 1775	Creeping Polly; 1756	Fanny	Starling mare
Dam Grey Highflyer (GB) 1782	Highflyer; 1774	Herod	Tartar*^
Dam Grey Highflyer (GB) 1782	Highflyer; 1774	Herod	Cypron
Dam Grey Highflyer (GB) 1782	Highflyer; 1774	Rachel	Blank
Dam Grey Highflyer (GB) 1782	Highflyer; 1774	Rachel	Sister to South^
Dam Grey Highflyer (GB) 1782	Monimia; 1771	Matchem	Cade
Dam Grey Highflyer (GB) 1782	Monimia; 1771	Matchem	Sister 2 Miss Partner
Dam Grey Highflyer (GB) 1782	Monimia; 1771	Alcides mare	Alcides
Dam Grey Highflyer (GB) 1782	Monimia; 1771	Alcides mare	Crab mare^

* Hambletonian is inbred 4S x 4D to the stallion Tartar, meaning that he appears fourth generation on the sire side of his pedigree and fourth generation on the dam side of his pedigree.

*^ Hambletonian is inbred 4S x 5D to the stallion Regulus, meaning that he appears fourth generation on the sire side of his pedigree and fifth generation (via Sister to South)^ on the dam side of his pedigree.

*^ Hambletonian is inbred 4S x 5D to the stallion Crab, meaning that he appears fourth generation on the sire side of his pedigree and fifth generation (via Crab mare)^ on the dam side of his pedigree.

== See also ==
- List of leading Thoroughbred racehorses
- Hambletonian 10, 1849–1876, a foundation sire of the harness racing breed known as the Standardbred.
