= Jem Chapple =

Personal information
- Born: 1801/1802 Exeter, Devon
- Died: 10 June 1858
- Resting place: Eriswell, Suffolk
- Occupation: Jockey

Horse racing career
- Sport: Horse racing

Major racing wins
- Major races Epsom Derby (1833, 1838); Epsom Oaks (1833)

Significant horses
- Amato, Dangerous, Vespa

James "Jem" Chapple (1801/1802 - 10 June 1858) was a British Classic-winning jockey. A "first-class and thoroughly English jockey" he won the Derby-Oaks double in 1833, and a further Derby in 1838.

== Career ==
He was born in Exeter, Devon in 1801 or 1802, but learnt his trade at Frank Neale's stable in Newmarket. He lived in Beccles, Waveney, and apart from some time spent in Northleach, Gloucestershire - rode almost exclusively at Newmarket. On his riding, it is said he worked "like a galley slave".

His greatest success came in 1833, when he won both the Derby and Oaks, riding Dangerous and 50/1 outsider Vespa respectively. The former win was not without controversy, however, as it is reported that Dangerous was a four-year-old, and thus ineligible for the Derby (a race for three-year-olds). He was also lame at the start, Chapple stating that he would not have given a pint of porter for his chance. He would go on to win a legitimate Derby in 1838 on the brown colt, Amato. This was to be the only time the horse raced, as he was injured soon after winning and retired.

After this, having won enough to fit his profession around his leisure time, Chapple rarely rode except for Sir Gilbert Heathcote, Amato's owner. Late in his career, however, he made a significant return to the track ("as fresh as paint") when winning the 1850 Autumn Double - the Cesarewitch on Mr Payne's Glauca and the Cambridgeshire on Mr. Gratwicke's Landgrave.

His last ride came on the 5/1 unplaced favourite Songstress in the 1853 Cesarewitch.

== Personal life ==
Despite his success, Chapple did not have a particular enthusiasm for racing and never discussed it. His reputation was for being quiet, unassuming and thrifty, and he never had substantial sums on a horse, unless he knew it had a lot in hand over its rivals. He was "quite one of the old school", shunning high fashion and frippery. He married Eleanor Jennings at St Mary's Church, Newmarket on 9 Dec 1835 and they had one daughter, Letitia Eleanor.

He was mentally alert to the end of his life, but after a period of long and gradual physical decline, he died on Thursday, 10 June 1858, leaving an estate of under £8,000. His age at death has been given as 62, but this would contradict his birth year given elsewhere. He is buried at St Laurence and St Peter, Eriswell, Suffolk.

The Hare and Hounds pub in Chalk Lane, Epsom, was renamed The Amato as a tribute to Chapple's 1838 Derby winner.

== Major wins ==
(United Kingdom) Great Britain

- Epsom Derby - (2) - Dangerous (1833), Amato (1838)
- Epsom Oaks - Vespa (1833)

== Bibliography ==
- Mortimer, Roger; Onslow, Richard; Willett, Peter (1978). Biographical Encyclopaedia of British Racing. London: Macdonald and Jane's. ISBN 0-354-08536-0.
