= Sir Bellingham Reginald Graham, 7th Baronet =

English Baronet

Bellingham Graham
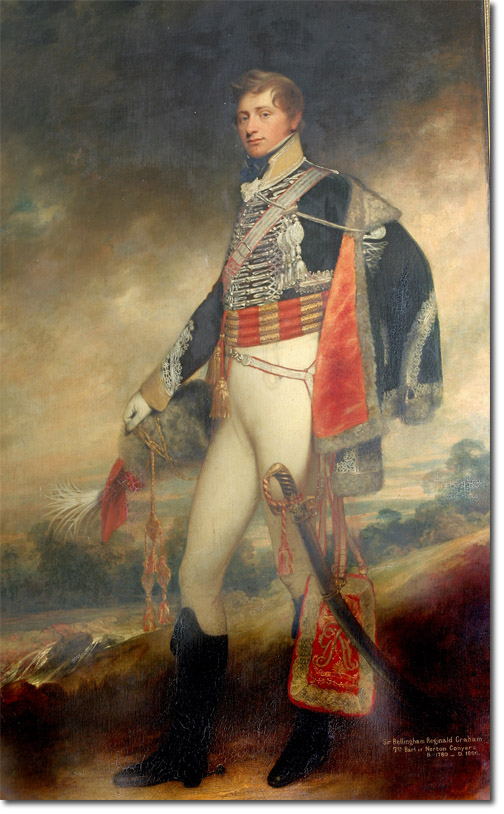
- Portrait by Sir William Beechey

Personal information
- Full name: Bellingham Reginald Graham
- Born: 4 November 1789; Norton Conyers House, Wath, Yorkshire
- Died: 15 June 1866 (aged 76); Westminster, London, England

Domestic team information
- Years: Team
- 1815: Middlesex
- Source: CricketArchive, 30 March 2013

Sir Bellingham Reginald Graham, 7th Baronet DL (4 November 1789 – 15 June 1866) was an English Baronet.

He served as an Army officer, initially as a cornet with the 23rd Light Dragoons from 1808. He was a lieutenant serving in the 10th Royal Hussars in 1810 and by 1811, was serving as a lieutenant colonel in the Clare Regiment of Local Militia. He took over the Clare Regiment of Local Militia as Lieutenant Colonel Commandant in January 1813. He resigned as Commandant in 1819, following a public disagreement with Lord Grantham.

Graham was appointed a Deputy Lieutenant for North Riding of Yorkshire in 1812.

Graham had several sporting interests, most notably as a cricketer who played for Middlesex. He is recorded in one match in 1815, totalling 0 runs with a highest score of 0. He was more closely associated with equine sports, serving as the Master of Hounds for a number of different hunts, including the Quorn Hunt and the Albrighton Hunt. His equine activities extended to racehorses for a period, and he owned the 1816 winner of the St Leger Stakes, The Duchess.

Yachting was another of Graham's interests; he was a member of the Royal Yacht Squadron at Cowes, serving as Vice-Commodore from 1848 to 1850. He owned several yachts including Harriet and Flirt.

He spent time at the Boodle's gentleman's club in his later years.

== Family ==
Graham was married twice, firstly to Harriet Clark with whom he had four children, though only one, also called Harriet, would survive to adulthood.

- Harriet Graham (died 1884); married firstly to Lieutenant-General Sir Frederick Ashworth, then to George Chichester, 3rd Marquess of Donegall.

His first wife died in Paris in 1830 following an accident with a carriage. He remarried in 1831 to Harriet Cottam, daughter of Rev. Robert Cottam. Lady Graham died in London on 17 January 1903, in her 94th year. They together had five children, all of whom survived to adulthood.

- Sir Reginald Henry Graham, 8th Baronet (1835–1920) who succeeded his father as 8th Baronet. Married 1876 to Annie Mary Shiffner, daughter of Thomas Shiffner, of the Shiffner baronets; they had three children, including Sir Reginald Guy Graham, 9th Baronet.
- Major-General George Fergus Graham (1836–1930), British Indian Army; married 1871 Margaret Anne Atkinson, daughter of Thomas Jasper Atkinson. They had one child, a son.
- Augusta Clementina Graham (died 1875), married Major Edmund de Feyl. They had one child, a daughter.
- Charlotte Harriet Graham (died 1927), unmarried. Charlotte was a nun with St Peter's sisterhood, London.
- Gertrude Elizabeth Priscilla Graham (died 1927), married 1863 Count Arthur Dillon (d.1889).

== Bibliography ==
- Haygarth, Arthur (1862). Scores & Biographies, Volume 1 (1744–1826). Lillywhite.
- Foster, Joseph (1882). The Peerage, Baronetage and Knightage of the British Empire (2 ed.).

Baronetage of England
Preceded by Bellingham Graham	Baronet (of Norton Conyers); 1796–1866	Succeeded by Reginald Graham
