= Blacklock (horse) =

British-bred Thoroughbred racehorse

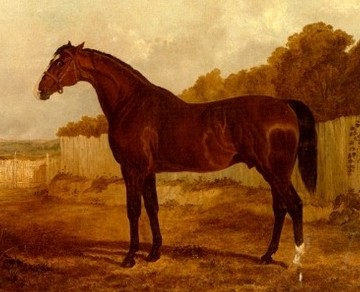
- Blacklock in Landscape by John Frederick Herring
- Sire: Whitelock
- Grandsire: Hambletonian
- Dam: Coriander mare
- Damsire: Coriander
- Sex: Stallion
- Foaled: 1814
- Country: Great Britain
- Colour: Bay
- Breeder: Francis Moss
- Owner: Thomas Kirby; Richard Watt
- Trainer: Tommy Sykes
- Record: 23: 17–4–1

Major wins
- Gascoigne Stakes (1817); Dundas Stakes (1817, 1818); Constitution Stakes (1818); 4yo Great Subscription Purse (1818); 4yo & 5yo Great Subscription Purse (1818); Sweepstakes of 25 gs at York (1818); Doncaster Stakes (1818); Doncaster Club Stakes (1818); York Gold Cup (1819); 5yo+ Great Subscription Purse (1819)

Awards
- Champion sire of Great Britain (1829)

Blacklock (1814 – 24 February 1831) was a British Thoroughbred racehorse who won seventeen of his twenty-three races. As a two-year-old in 1816 he was undefeated in three starts. In his first race as a three-year-old he finished second in the St. Leger, a neck behind Ebor. He then won four races in two weeks, including the Gascoigne Stakes and Dundas Stakes. In 1818 he recorded several wins including two of the Great Subscription Purses at York. He won a third Great Subscription Purse in 1819, along with the York Gold Cup. After retiring from racing, Blacklock became a successful stallion and was champion sire of Great Britain in 1829, the year his son Voltaire won the Doncaster Cup. He was owned by Thomas Kirby as a two-year-old, before being purchased by Richard Watt, who owned him for the remainder of his racing career. Blacklock was trained by Tommy Sykes.

== Background ==
Blacklock was a bay colt bred by Francis Moss and foaled in 1814. He was sired by Whitelock, who won a number of races in the north of England. Whitelock was a son of St. Leger and dual Doncaster Cup winner Hambletonian, who was only defeated once in his career. Blacklock's dam was a daughter of Coriander. He was the seventh of her nine foals, the youngest of which being 1822 St. Leger winner Theodore. Francis Moss had bought Blacklock's dam for £3 in 1803.

Blacklock was not thought to be a good-looking horse. He was described as having "a head like a half-moon" and being calf-kneed. Thomas Kirby purchased him from Moss for £40.

== Racing career ==
=== 1816: Two-year-old season ===
Blacklock, who was then unnamed and raced under the name "Mr. Kirby's b. c. by Whitelock, dam by Coriander", made his racecourse debut on 23 August 1816 at York in a sweepstakes of 20 guineas each for two-year-olds. After starting at the price of about 3/1 he won the race, with the judge being unable to place any of his five rivals. On 11 September at Pontefract, he faced three opponents for a sweepstakes of 20 guineas each over one mile (1609 metres). He started as the 13/8 favourite and won the race. Shylock finished in second place, with Angelica in third. Blacklock was then purchased by Richard Watt. Racing in Watt's colours (Harlequin) and ridden by jockey J. Jackson, Blacklock made his final start as a two-year-old at Doncaster on the 24 September when he competed in another sweepstakes of 20 guineas each. He started as the 4/7 favourite and won the race from the Young Woodpecker colt, who was followed by Eglinton. Blacklock apparently won the race easily.

=== 1817: Three-year-old season ===
Blacklock, still unnamed, had his first race as a three-year-old in the St. Leger Stakes at Doncaster on Monday 22 September. He did not arrive at Doncaster until the Saturday before, and after reports that he was amiss his odds had lengthened to as much as 10/1 in the betting. After arriving, he had a gallop in the afternoon and soon shortened in the betting. After another of the pre-race favourites, Stainborough, was withdrawn due to illness Blacklock was sent off as the short-priced favourite at about evens. Blacklock appeared like he was going to win easily and Jackson eased him up in the final furlong (200 metres) of the race. However, Ebor and Restless began to quickly close down his lead. By the time Jackson realised, Blacklock could not accelerate quick enough and Ebor came out on top, beating Blacklock by a neck. Restless finished in third place and was the only other runner that could be placed by the judge. Blacklock had a crack in one of his hind heels, which was thought to have affected him in the race.

Two days after the St. Leger, Blacklock faced St. Helena over the same course and distance in the Gascoigne Stakes, which he won easily. Twenty-four hours later, Blacklock lost to The Duchess in the Doncaster Club Stakes over two miles. On 8 October at Richmond he won a sweepstakes of 20 guineas each, beating four rivals, with Boroughman finishing second. Later in the day Blacklock won the Dundas Stakes, beating Rasping, D.I.O and Shepard into second, third and fourth respectively.

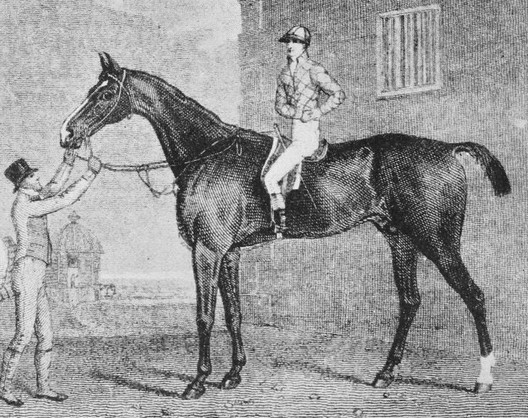
Engraving of Blacklock

=== 1818: Four-year-old season ===
Blacklock, racing under his name for the first time, started the 1818 season much earlier than he had done the previous two seasons, with his first race coming on 18 May at the York Spring Meeting in a sweepstakes of 20 guineas each over two miles. He started as the 1/2 favourite, but could only finish third behind St. Helena. Two days later he started as the 4/6 favourite for the Constitution Stakes over a mile-and-a-quarter. He biggest rival was expected to be the Duke of Leeds's Rasping, who was priced at 2/1. Blacklock won the race from Rasping, with Hornby in third and Whiff last of the four runners.

Blacklock did not race again until August at York, where he ran in the four-mile Great Subscription Purse for four-year-olds. He started as the evens favourite and faced three rivals; Agatha, St. Helena and a filly by Orville. Blacklock won the race by over 100 yards (91 metres) without being asked for an effort, causing some people to proclaim "nothing has been seen at all equal to Mr. Watt's Blacklock since the days of Eclipse." This referring to the ease with which Eclipse won his races. Agatha finished the race in second place and St. Helena in third. The race was won in a time of 7 minutes 23 seconds. The next day he beat Silenus to win the four-mile Great Subscription Purse for four and five-year-olds. Later in the same day he started as the 1/2 favourite in a two-mile sweepstakes of 25 guineas each, where he faced four opponents. Despite it being his third race in two days he won, beating Rasping into second place.

Blacklock then went to Doncaster, where on 23 September, he started 1/2 favourite and beat The Duchess to win the Doncaster Stakes over four miles. The same day he also walked over for a sweepstakes of 50 guineas each over the St. Leger course. Twenty-four hours later he beat Rasping to win a sweepstakes of 25 guineas each over four miles, and then went on to beat The Duchess to win the Doncaster Club Stakes. This was his fourth race in the space of two days. At Richmond in October he won his second Dundas Stakes, this time beating King Corney. Later in the day Blacklock finished last of four runners behind winner Doctor Syntax in the Richmond Cup over four miles. Doctor Syntax had started in the lead, but was overtaken by Blacklock after only 200 yards. Blacklock held the lead until about half a mile from the finish, when Doctor Syntax joined him again. Blacklock then swerved out of line, allowing Doctor Syntax to win easily. By the time The Richmond Cup was run Blacklock was apparently unwell and was coughing repeatedly during the race.

=== 1819: Five-year-old season ===
On 17 May 1819 at York, Blacklock finished second of seven in a two-mile sweepstakes of 20 guineas each. The race was won by The Marshall. On 18 May he started as the evens favourite for the two-mile Gold Cup. He won the race, with Paulowitz finishing second, Torch-bearer third and Otho fourth. At the York August Meeting, Blacklock faced three rivals in the four-mile Great Subscription Purse for five-year-olds and older. The Duchess started as the 5/2 favourite, with Blacklock and St. Helena both at 3/1 and Magistrate at 4/1. Blacklock won the race from Magistrate, with The Duchess finishing in third place. Blacklock's final race came two days later, when he finished second to St. Helena in a sweepstakes of 25 guineas each over two miles. During his racing career Blacklock had twenty-three races, winning seventeen of those, placing second four times and third once.

== Race record ==
Date	Race name	Distance	Course	Prize	Odds	Runners	Place	Winner/Runner-up	Ref.
22 August 1816	Sweepstakes of 20gs	5¼ furlongs	York	120 gs	3/1	6	1	None^{[a]}	
12 September 1816	Sweepstakes of 20gs	1 mile	Pontefract	80 gs	13/8	4	1	Shycock	
24 September 1816	Sweepstakes of 20gs	1 mile	Doncaster	200 gs	4/7	6	1	Young Woodpecker colt	
22 September 1817	St. Leger Stakes	1 mile 6½f	Doncaster	1275 gs	11/10	17	2	Ebor	
24 September 1817	Gascoigne Stakes	1 mile 6½f	Doncaster	340 gs	8/13	2	1	St. Helena	
25 September 1817	Doncaster Club Stakes	2 miles	Doncaster	175 gs		2	2	The Duchess	
8 October 1817	Sweepstakes of 20 gs	once round	Richmond	180 gs		5	1	Boroughman	
8 October 1817	Dundas Stakes	once round	Richmond	170 gs		4	1	Rasping	
18 May 1818	Sweepstakes of 20 gs	2 miles	York	160 gs	1/2	6	3	St. Helena	
20 May 1818	Constitution Stakes	1¼ miles	York	140 gs	4/6	4	1	Rasping	
19 August 1818	Great Subscription Purse (4yo)	4 miles	York		Evens	4	1	Agatha	
20 August 1818	Great Subscription Purse (4yo & 5yo)	4 miles	York		2/11	2	1	Silenus	
20 August 1818	Sweepstakes of 25 gs	2 miles	York	250 gs	1/2	5	1	Rasping	
23 September 1818	Doncaster Stakes	4 miles	Doncaster	150 gs	1/2	2	1	The Duchess	
23 September 1818	Sweepstakes of 50 gs	1 mile 6½f	Doncaster	120 gs	N/A	1	1	Walkover	
24 September 1818	Sweepstakes of 25 gs	4 miles	Doncaster	100 gs		2	1	Rasping	
24 September 1818	Doncaster Club Stakes	2 miles	Doncaster	125 gs	1/8	2	1	The Duchess	
7 October 1818	Dundas Stakes	once round	Richmond	130 gs		2	1	King Corney	
7 October 1818	Gold Cup	4 miles	Richmond	242 gs		4	4	Doctor Syntax	
17 May 1819	Sweepstakes of 20 gs	2 miles	York	120 gs	4/6	7	2	The Marshal	
18 May 1819	Gold Cup	2 miles	York	240 gs	Evens	4	1	Paulowitz	
10 August 1819	Great Subscription Purse (5yo+)	4 miles	York	189 gs	3/1	4	1	Magistrate	
12 August 1819	Sweepstakes of 25 gs	2 miles	York	250 gs	Evens	4	2	St. Helena	

^{a} Only the winner could be placed by the judge.

== Stud career ==
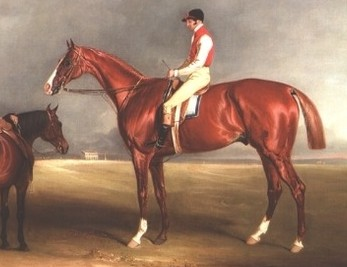
Blacklock's son Velocipede

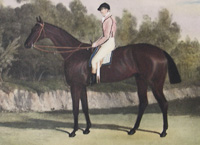
Blacklock's son Voltaire

Blacklock was retired to stud, where he became a successful stallion. He first stood at Bishop Burton in Yorkshire, with his fee initially set at 15 guineas and half a guinea for the groom (Thomas Barrow). He was then leased to Thomas Kirkby in York for four seasons where he stood for a much lower fee. In 1827 he was at Bildeston in Suffolk and was commanding a stud fee of twelve guineas. His fee reached up to 25 guineas.

Blacklock was champion sire of Great Britain in 1829. His progeny included:

- Brutandorf (1821) – won the Tradesmen's Cup and Stand Cup at Chester in 1826. As a sire he produced the Grand National winner Gaylad and Hetman Platoff, who won several cups. He was also grandsire of Derby winner Cossack.
- Brownlock (1822) – won 25 races.
- Belzoni (1823) – won the York St. Leger and later became a successful sire of hunters. He produced Vanguard, who won the Grand National in 1843.
- Laurel (1824) – won the Doncaster Cup in 1828. Through one of his unnamed daughters he was the damsire of Oaks winners Rhedycina and Governess.
- Robin Hood (1825) – won ten races including two Newcastle Gold Cups.
- Belinda (1825) – finished second in the St. Leger at Doncaster. As a broodmare she foaled Gimcrack Stakes winner Tuscan, as well as Lollypop, who became the dam of Doncaster Cup winner Sweetmeat.
- Miss Pratt (1825) – foaled Echidna, who was the dam of The Baron. The Baron won the St. Leger and sired the influential stallion Stockwell.
- Velocipede (1825) – won the York St. Leger, York Gold Cup and Liverpool Cup. He sired Derby winner Amato, Oaks and St. Leger winner Queen of Trumps and 2000 Guineas winner Meteor.
- Tranby (1826) – won the Oatlands Stakes in 1832 and ran four four-mile legs in George Osbaldeston's successful attempt to ride 200 miles in 10 hours.
- Voltaire (1826) – won the Doncaster Gold Cup and finished second in the St. Leger in 1829. He sired Derby and St. Leger winner Voltigeur. Voltigeur's son Vedette was the grandsire of the undefeated St. Simon, who became Champion sire nine times. It is mainly through St. Simon that Blacklock's sire line survives today.
- Moss Rose (1827) – won the Dee Stakes at Chester.
- Belshazzar (1830) – finished third in an Ascot Gold Cup. He sired 1000 Guineas winner Cara and was later sent to America.
- Blacklock mare – foaled Progress, who was the dam of Derby winner Attila.

Blacklock died on 24 February 1831 at Bishop Burton after rupturing a blood vessel when covering a mare. His death was described as "instantaneous". In total Blacklock sired the winners of 442 races and over £50,000.

== Sire line tree ==
- Blacklock
  - Blue Beard
  - Brutandorf
    - Huntington
    - Physician
      - Colchicum
      - Cure-All
      - Aristotle
      - Blackdrop
        - Seahorse
          - Seemann
        - Verzug
        - Apropos
        - Percy
          - Jupiter Tonans
        - Shark
        - Meleager
        - Little Pippin
        - Bellario
      - Doctor
      - The Cure
        - Lambton
          - Trust
          - Chibisa
          - Inveresk
        - El Hakim
        - Underhand
          - Fervacques
        - Sedbury
        - Antidote
        - Dictator
      - Psalmsinger
      - Experience
    - Somonocodron
    - Gaylad
    - Hetman Platoff
      - Tom Tulloch
      - Joc O'Sot
        - Joco
      - The Cossack
        - Costrel
        - Gamester
        - Rouble
        - Alcibiade
      - Beverlac
        - Escape
      - Springy Jack
        - Oberon
      - Neasham
      - Muscovite
        - Ivanoff
        - Vaubon
        - Foud De Guerre
      - Coriander
      - Hospodar
        - Le Drole
      - Flatterer
  - Buzzard
    - Bentley
    - Phoenix
    - Jersey
    - Gorhambury
    - Ratan
      - Malacca
  - Greylock
  - Streatham
  - Brownlock
  - Cock Robin
  - Crowcatcher
  - Hazard
  - Belzoni
    - Vanguard
  - Laurel
  - Malek
  - Popsy
  - Robin Hood
  - Silverlock
  - Sparkler
  - The Deer
  - Ben Lomond
  - Black Heddon
  - Clinton
  - Jour De Noces
  - Olympus
  - Pelion
  - Poor Fellow
  - Splinter Bar
  - Velocipede
    - Valparaiso
    - Ainderby
    - Hornsea
    - The Skater
    - Blankney
    - Amato
    - Lightfoot
    - Capote
    - Confederate
    - Morgan Rattler
      - Half Caste
    - Wizard Of The North
      - The Conjurer
    - Knight Of The Whistle
    - Millipede
    - Meteor
    - Amorino
    - Antidote
    - Winesour
    - Joe Lovell
    - Wood Pigeon
    - Lyons
    - King Of Trumps
      - Haddington
      - Deceit
        - Deze
        - Dear Boy
      - Thorn
  - Young Blacklock
    - Whitefoot
    - Magpie
      - Pickpocket
      - Chatterer
      - Third Of May
    - Permit
    - Apollo
  - Agitator
  - Bolivar
  - Navarino
  - Niger
  - Robin Redbreast
  - Tamboff
  - Thatcher
  - Tranby
    - I Am Not Aware
  - Voltaire
    - Harpurley
    - Picaroon
    - Charles the Twelfth
      - Fire Eater
        - Salamander
      - Little Charley
    - Jack Sheppard
    - Yorkshire Lad
    - Foxberry
    - Barnton
      - Fandango
    - Voltigeur
      - Skirmisher
        - Ripponden
      - Vedette
        - Ashstead
        - Speculum
        - Galopin
      - Sabreur
      - Bivouac
      - Virgilius
        - Double Zero
      - Buckstone
      - The Ranger
        - Uhlan
      - Tibthorpe
        - Woolsthorpe
      - Billet
        - Billet Doux
        - Volturno
        - Elias Lawrence
        - Runnymede
        - Barnes
        - Burton
        - Blue Wing
        - Belvidere
        - Ballston
        - Grey Dawn
        - Raceland
        - Sir Dixon
        - Carroll
        - Newton
  - Wodenblock
  - Acis
  - Apuntador
  - Bryan
  - Crescent
  - Belshazzar
    - Manderin
    - Lunatic
    - Vandyke
    - Corporal Trim
    - Florizel

== Pedigree ==
Pedigree of Blacklock, bay stallion, 1814
Sire Whitelock (GB) b. 1803	Hambletonian (GB) b. 1792	King Fergus ch. 1775	Eclipse*
Sire Whitelock (GB) b. 1803	Hambletonian (GB) b. 1792	King Fergus ch. 1775	Polly
Sire Whitelock (GB) b. 1803	Hambletonian (GB) b. 1792	Grey Highflyer gr. 1782	Highflyer*
Sire Whitelock (GB) b. 1803	Hambletonian (GB) b. 1792	Grey Highflyer gr. 1782	Monimia*^
Sire Whitelock (GB) b. 1803	Rosalind (GB) ch. 1788	Phoenomenon ch. 1780	Herod*
Sire Whitelock (GB) b. 1803	Rosalind (GB) ch. 1788	Phoenomenon ch. 1780	Frenzy*^
Sire Whitelock (GB) b. 1803	Rosalind (GB) ch. 1788	Atalanta ch. 1769	Matchem*
Sire Whitelock (GB) b. 1803	Rosalind (GB) ch. 1788	Atalanta ch. 1769	Lass Of The Mill
Dam Coriander mare (GB) 1799	Coriander (GB) b. 1786	Potoooooooo* ch. 1773	Eclipse*
Dam Coriander mare (GB) 1799	Coriander (GB) b. 1786	Potoooooooo* ch. 1773	Sportsmistress
Dam Coriander mare (GB) 1799	Coriander (GB) b. 1786	Lavender b. 1778	Herod*
Dam Coriander mare (GB) 1799	Coriander (GB) b. 1786	Lavender b. 1778	Snap mare
Dam Coriander mare (GB) 1799	Wildgoose (GB) br. 1792	Highflyer* b. 1774	Herod*
Dam Coriander mare (GB) 1799	Wildgoose (GB) br. 1792	Highflyer* b. 1774	Rachel
Dam Coriander mare (GB) 1799	Wildgoose (GB) br. 1792	Coheiress ch. 1786	Potoooooooo*^
Dam Coriander mare (GB) 1799	Wildgoose (GB) br. 1792	Coheiress ch. 1786	Manilla

Note: b. = Bay, br. = Brown, ch. = Chestnut, gr. = Grey

* Blacklock is inbred 4S x 3D to the stallion Highflyer, meaning that he appears fourth generation on the sire side of his pedigree and third generation on the dam side of his pedigree.

* Blacklock is inbred 3D x 4D to the stallion Potoooooooo, meaning that he appears third generation and fourth generation on the dam side of his pedigree.

*^ Blacklock is inbred 5S x 4S x 4D x 4D to the stallion Herod, meaning that he appears fifth generation (via Highflyer)^ and fourth generation on the sire side of his pedigree and fourth generation twice on the dam side of his pedigree.

*^ Blacklock is inbred 4S x 5S x 4D x 5D to the stallion Eclipse, meaning that he appears fourth generation and fifth generation (via Frenzy)^ on the sire side of his pedigree and fourth generation and fifth generation (via Potoooooooo)^ on the dam side of his pedigree.

*^ Blacklock is inbred 5S x 4S to the stallion Matchem, meaning that he appears fifth generation (via Monimia)^ and fourth generation on the sire side of his pedigree.
