= Velocipede (horse) =

British-bred Thoroughbred racehorse

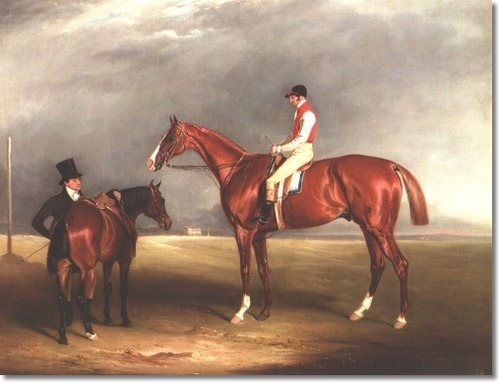
- Velocipede by John Ferneley
- Sire: Blacklock
- Grandsire: Whitelock
- Dam: Juniper mare
- Damsire: Juniper
- Sex: Stallion
- Foaled: 1825
- Country: United Kingdom
- Colour: Chestnut
- Breeder: Francis Moss
- Owner: William Scott; William Armitage
- Trainer: William Scott and John Scott
- Record: 9: 7-1-1

Major wins
- York St Leger (1828); York Gold Cup (1829); Match against Bessy Bedlam (1829); Liverpool Spring Cup (1829)

Velocipede (1825–1850) was a British Thoroughbred racehorse and sire. In a racing career which was restricted by injury he raced nine times in three years, recording seven wins, one second and one third place. Although he ran only in Yorkshire and Lancashire and was beaten into third place in his most important race, the St Leger Stakes, Velocipede was regarded by nineteenth-century experts as one of the best British horses of the era. He later became a successful breeding stallion.

== Background ==
Velocipede was a chestnut horse with a white blaze and three white socks bred in Yorkshire by Francis Moss. He was sired by Blacklock, who won several races in Yorkshire and finished second in a controversial race for the St Leger. As a stallion he was most influential as the sire of Voltaire, the direct male ancestor of numerous successful runners including Voltigeur, Galopin and St. Simon. Velocipede's dam, an unnamed mare by Juniper, had many other successful descendants including the 1000 Guineas winners Pic-nic and Mayonaise.

As a yearling, Velocipede was bought for £120 by William Scott on behalf of William Armitage. Scott had previously tried to offer the horse to Thomas Houldsworth but the colt was rejected as lacking strength and substance, with Houldsworth reportedly saying that he "would not give sixpence for such a slight-legged one". The horse was trained by Scott and his brother John at the Whitewall stables near Malton, North Yorkshire.

== Racing career ==
=== 1827: two-year-old season ===
Velocipede began his racing career at Catterick Bridge Racecourse on 19 April 1827. Racing over a one-mile course and ridden by Bill Scott, he started favourite and won very easily ("in a canter") from Game Boy and Rector. On 22 May at York the colt started at odds of 5/4 for a Sweepstakes and "won easy" from eight opponents.

After a break of almost four months, Velocipede returned to action at the St Leger meeting at Doncaster Racecourse on 20 September. He started the 1/3 favourite for a Sweepstakes but was beaten by the filly Bessy Bedlam. On 11 October at Northallerton Velocipede ended his first season by winning a nine furlong Sweepstakes at odd of 4/7.

Velocipede had not been entered for the Epsom Derby, but his performances made him the favourite for the following year's St Leger.

=== 1828: three-year-old season ===
On 12 May Velocipede began his three-year-old campaign in the York "St Leger" over a distance of one and three-quarter miles. Ridden by Bill Scott, he started at odds of 1/2 and won from Mr Broadhead's unnamed grey colt and four others.

On his only other run of the season, Velocipede contested the St Leger Stakes at Doncaster, in which Scott also ran The Colonel who had beaten in a run-off for the Epsom Derby after running a dead-heat with Cadland. Before the race Velocipede had beaten The Colonel in a trial gallop, but injured himself in the process and appeared for the race heavily bandaged on his right foreleg. He went into the lead from the start and maintained his advantage until the last quarter mile when he weakened "from want of condition" and finished third to The Colonel and the filly Belinda.

=== 1829: four-year-old season ===
Velocipede returned to the racecourse as a four-year-old at York on 26 May 1829. In the York Gold Cup he started the 5/4 favourite against three opponents including Major Yarburgh's five-year-old Laurel, the winner of the 1828 Doncaster Cup. Laurel set a strong pace but Velocipede overtook him inside the final furlong and won "cleverly" by half a length. In their report on the race, the Sporting Magazine opined that Velocipede had proved himself "undoubtedly the best horse of his year". On the following day he ran a £300 match race against Bessy Bedlam, the filly who had defeated him at Doncaster in 1827 and won easily by several lengths.

On 7 July at Liverpool Velocipede ran his last race in the Tradesmen's Cup over two miles. He started the 6/4 favourite in a field of ten and won from Dr Faustus. On the following day, Velocipede was saddled for the Stand Cup at the same venue but was found to be lame when cantering to the start and was withdrawn.

== Assessment ==
In May 1886 The Sporting Times carried out a poll of one hundred racing experts to create a ranking of the best British racehorses of the 19th century. Despite having been retired more than fifty years previously, Velocipede was ranked in the top ten by eight of the contributors, placing him thirtieth in the final list. No horse foaled earlier than Velocipede was included in the list.

At John Scott's home at Whitewall, a painting of Velocipede was placed in the "post of honour" in the dining room. William Scott said of Velocipede and his injuries that "if his legs had been cut off, he'd have fought on his stumps". John Scott regarded Velocipede at his best as at least 20 pounds superior to The Colonel.

== Stud record ==
Velocipede was retired to become a breeding stallion and spent the rest of his life at studs in the North of England. He was based in Yorkshire at Ainderby and then at Shadwell Lane near Leeds, before moving to Cumberland where he stood at Corney Hall. He sired three classic winners: Amato (Derby), Queen of Trumps (Oaks, St Leger) and Meteor (2000 Guineas). Velocipede died at Corney Hall on 18 June 1850.

== Sire line tree ==
- Velocipede
  - Valparaiso
  - Ainderby
  - Hornsea
  - The Skater
  - Blankney
  - Amato
  - Lightfoot
  - Capote
  - Confederate
  - Morgan Rattler
    - Half Caste
  - Wizard Of The North
    - The Conjurer
  - Knight Of The Whistle
  - Millipede
  - Meteor
  - Amorino
  - Antidote
  - Winesour
  - Joe Lovell
  - Wood Pigeon
  - Lyons
  - King Of Trumps
    - Haddington
    - Deceit
      - Deze
        - Dadzal
      - Dear Boy
        - Bajraktar
    - Thorn

== Pedigree ==
Pedigree of Velocipede (GB), Chestnut stallion 1825
Sire Blacklock (GB) 1814	Whitelock; 1803	Hambletonian	King Fergus
Sire Blacklock (GB) 1814	Whitelock; 1803	Hambletonian	Grey Highflyer*^
Sire Blacklock (GB) 1814	Whitelock; 1803	Rosalind	Phoenomenon
Sire Blacklock (GB) 1814	Whitelock; 1803	Rosalind	Atalanta
Sire Blacklock (GB) 1814	Coriander mare 1799	Coriander	Potoooooooo*
Sire Blacklock (GB) 1814	Coriander mare 1799	Coriander	Lavender
Sire Blacklock (GB) 1814	Coriander mare 1799	Wildgoose	Highflyer*
Sire Blacklock (GB) 1814	Coriander mare 1799	Wildgoose	Coheiress*^
Dam Juniper mare (GB) 1817	Juniper; 1805	Whiskey	Saltram
Dam Juniper mare (GB) 1817	Juniper; 1805	Whiskey	Calash
Dam Juniper mare (GB) 1817	Juniper; 1805	Jenny Spinner	Dragon
Dam Juniper mare (GB) 1817	Juniper; 1805	Jenny Spinner	Eclipse mare
Dam Juniper mare (GB) 1817	Sorcerer mare 1810	Sorcerer	Trumpator
Dam Juniper mare (GB) 1817	Sorcerer mare 1810	Sorcerer	Young Giantess
Dam Juniper mare (GB) 1817	Sorcerer mare 1810	Virgin	Sir Peter Teazle*^
Dam Juniper mare (GB) 1817	Sorcerer mare 1810	Virgin	Potoooooooo mare (Family:3-i)*^

*^ Velocipede is inbred 4S x 5S x 5D to the stallion Potoooooooo, meaning that he appears fourth generation and fifth generation (via Coheiress)^ on the sire side of his pedigree and fifth generation (via Potoooooooo mare)^ on the dam side of his pedigree.

*^ Velocipede is inbred 5S x 4S x 5D to the stallion Highflyer, meaning that he appears fifth generation (via Grey Highflyer)^ and fourth generation on the sire side of his pedigree and fifth generation (via Sir Peter Teazle)^ on the dam side of his pedigree.
