= The Duchess (horse) =

British-bred Thoroughbred racehorse

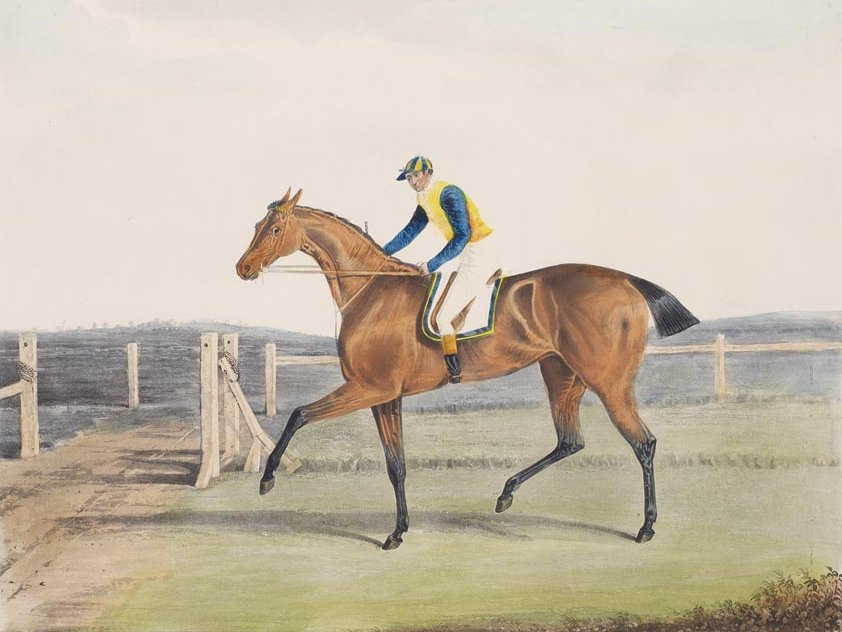
- 'The Duchess', the Winner of the Great St. Leger at Doncaster, 1816 by John Frederick Herring, Sr.
- Sire: Cardinal York
- Grandsire: Sir Peter Teazle
- Dam: Miss Nancy
- Damsire: Beningbrough
- Sex: Mare
- Foaled: 1813
- Country: United Kingdom
- Colour: Bay
- Owner: William Wilson; Sir Bellingham Reginald Graham, 7th Baronet; John George Lambton
- Trainer: James Croft
- Record: 33:19-7-5

Major wins
- Pontefract Gold Cup (1816, 1817); St Leger Stakes (1816); Doncaster Stakes (1817); Doncaster Club Stakes (1817); Richmond Gold Cup (1817); York Gold Cup (1818); Great Subscription Purse (1818); Gosforth Stakes (1819); Newcastle Gold Cup (1819)

The Duchess (1813–1836) was a British Thoroughbred racehorse and broodmare best known for winning the classic St Leger Stakes in 1816. In a racing career which lasted from March 1815 until October 1819 she competed in thirty-three races and won nineteen times. She was still unnamed when winning three races as a two-year-old in 1815, when she was one of the leading juveniles in the north of England. In the following year she was named Duchess of Leven, which was shortened to The Duchess when she was sold to Sir Bellingham Graham. She won seven of her nine races as a three-year-old, including the Gold Cup at Pontefract and the St Leger at Doncaster. The Duchess remained in training for a further three seasons, winning five times in 1817, twice in 1818 and twice in 1819, beating many leading horses of the time including Blacklock, Doctor Syntax, Rhoda and Filho da Puta. After her retirement from racing, The Duchess had some success as a broodmare.

== Background ==
The Duchess was a bay mare bred by Mr Ellerker and was the fifth of eight foals produced by Ellerker's mare Miss Nancy (1803–1817). The Duchess was the only classic winner sired by Cardinal York, a son of Sir Peter Teazle. Cardinal York was based at Mr T Kirby's stable at York, where he was standing at a fee of seven guineas in 1816.

== Racing career ==
=== 1815: two-year-old season ===
Until 1913, there was no requirement for British racehorses to have official names, and the horse who later became known as The Duchess competed in 1811 as Mr. W. Wilson's b. f. by Cardinal York, dam by Beningbrough.

Mr Wilson's filly made her first appearance at Catterick Bridge Racecourse on 30 March 1815 when she finished third in the one mile Yearling Stakes: it was to be her only defeat of the season. The filly recorded her first win at York Racecourse on 31 May, when she won a sweepstakes from a single opponent. At the next York meeting in August she won another sweepstakes at odds of 2/1 before ending her season at Doncaster Racecourse in September. On the day following Filho da Puta's victory in the St Leger, Wilson's filly defeated three opponents in a sweepstakes over the Two-Year-Old course.

=== 1816: three-year-old season ===
Before the start of the 1816 season, Wilson's filly was officially named Duchess of Leven. On 18 April at Catterick Bridge Duchess of Leven made her first appearance as a three-year-old when she defeated Windlass to win the Filly Stakes over one and a half miles. At York in May Duchess of Leven was matched against colts for the first time in the York Spring St Leger Stakes. The success of the St Leger at Doncaster had led other major courses, including York and Newmarket to use the name for their own long distance races for three-year-olds; the original race was renamed the "Great St Leger" for several years to distinguish itself from the imitators. The filly finished third in the race behind the Duke of Leeds' colt Rasping. On the following afternoon, Duchess of Leven began a six race winning sequence when she beat Woodpecker Lass, and five other fillies in a sweepstakes over one and a half miles. In June, the filly appeared at Newcastle Racecourse in Northumberland where she defeated Lord Strathmore's filly over one mile.

After a two-month break, Duchess of Leven returned to York in August where she won a sweepstakes over one and three quarter miles from Mr Petre's bay filly. On 11 September, Wilson's filly was matched against older horses in the Gold Cup at Pontefract Racecourse. Racing over a distance of four miles, she won from the four-year-old gelding Everlasting, with the favourite Shepherd in third place. Following her race at Pontefract, Duchess of Leven was bought by Sir Bellingham Graham of Norton Conyers, a noted Master of Foxhounds, and officially renamed The Duchess. On 23 September, The Duchess was one of a field of ten colts and three fillies to contest the forty-first running of the St Leger at Doncaster. She was the fourth choice in the betting at odds of 12/1 behind the filly Maritornes and the colts Rasping and Lucifer. Ridden by Ben Smith, she won the classic from Richard Watt's colt Captain Candid, with Rasping in third. Three days later, running over the St Leger course and distance, The Duchess won a sweepstakes for fillies, beating Wathcote Lass "in a canter". The Duchess ended her season at Richmond in October. Racing on extremely soft ground she finished second, beaten a head by Leopold in the four mile Richmond Gold Cup, with the favourite Filho da Puta in third. The report of the race in the Sporting Magazine claimed that the filly should have won comfortably, but her inexperienced rider, believing he had won the race by overcoming the challenge of Filho da Puta, eased her down towards the finish and was caught in the last strides. She ended the season with earnings of 1,820 guineas.

=== 1817: four-year-old season ===
The Duchess did not race as a four-year-old until July, when she started favourite for the Gold Cup at Preston and finished third behind the six-year-old Doctor Syntax. On her next appearance in August she finished second to Maritornes in a subscription race at York, with Captain Candid in third.

On 10 September, The Duchess returned to Pontefract and won the Gold Cup for the second time, beating Mr Lambton's Silenus. two weeks later, The Duchess ran at the St Leger meeting at Doncaster, where she had four engagements. On 22 September, the day on which Ebor won the St Leger, The Duchess won a prize of 50 guineas without having to race, when Richard Watt's colt Cacambo failed to appear for a scheduled match race. Two days later, The Duchess again won without having to gallop when she was allowed to walk over for a sweepstakes over the St Leger course. Later the same day, she contested the Doncaster Stakes, a weight-for-age race over four miles. The Duchess started the 1/2 favourite and won Captain Candid. On the following day, The Duchess was pitted against the leading three-year-old colt Blacklock in the Doncaster Club Stakes over two miles. She conceded fifteen pounds to the colt and won at odds of 4/7. The Duchess again ended her season with a run at Richmond, where she defeated Doctor Syntax and four others to win the Gold Cup.

=== 1818: five-year-old season ===
In late 1818 or early 1819 The Duchess was sold again and entered into the ownership of J. G. Lambton. The Duchess began her fourth season by beating Rasping at level weights in the Gold Cup at York on 19 May. She did not race again until July when she finished second in the Preston Gold Cup to Doctor Syntax who was winning the race for the fourth year in succession. In August, The Duchess ran in a division of the Great Subscription Purse over four miles at York. Starting at odds of 2/1 she won the race from Bustler, Rasping and King David.

In September, The Duchess ran without success at the St Leger meeting. She was the only horse to oppose Blacklock in the Doncaster Stakes and the Doncaster Club Stakes but was beaten by the younger horse in both races. In the four mile Doncaster Cup she started favourite but finished fourth of the six runners behind Rasping. For the third consecutive year she ended her season at Richmond where she finished third to Doctor Syntax and Juggler in the Gold Cup.

=== 1819: six-year-old season ===
In the spring of 1819, The Duchess left the north of England for the first time when she was sent to compete at Newmarket in Suffolk. On 13 April she met the leading southern mare Rhoda in a division of the Oatlands Stakes, a handicap race over the two-mile "Ditch-In" course: the two mares carried equal top weight of 125 pounds. The Duchess finished second to Lord Foley's colt Boniface, who carried 112 pounds, with Rhoda in third. At the next Newmarket meeting two weeks later, The Duchess failed to conceded seven pounds to Mr Fox's colt Merlin in a 300 guinea match over the same course.

The Duchess returned to the north for two races at Newcastle in June. She defeated The Marshal and Fitz-Orville in the two mile Gosforth Stakes on the Tuesday of the meeting and recorded her last victory two days later when she beat Bustler and four others in the four mile Newcastle Gold Cup. In August she started favourite for a division of the Great Subscription Purse at York but finished third of the four runners behind Blacklock. The Duchess ended her racing career in October 1819 by running unplaced behind Otho and Doctor Syntax in the Richmond Gold Cup.

== Stud career ==
The Duchess was retired from racing to become a broodmare for Lambton. She passed into the ownership of the Duke of Richmond in 1826 and the Duke of Portland in 1831. She produced nine foals between 1821 and 1831:

- 1821 Margravine, a bay filly sired by Smolensko
- 1822 Baroness, bay filly by Leopold, dam of the Chester Cup winner King Cole
- 1823 brown colt by Soothsayer
- 1824 chestnut filly by Abjer
- 1825 filly by Whisker
- 1826 bay filly by Blacklock
- 1827 Concert, chestnut colt by Figaro
- 1828 Conciliation, bay filly by Moses
- 1830 filly by Moses
- 1831 colt by Tiresias

The General Stud Book suggests that The Duchess died in 1836.

== Pedigree ==
Pedigree of The Duchess (GB), bay mare, 1813
Sire Cardinal York (GB) 1804	Sir Peter Teazle; 1784	Highflyer	Herod
Sire Cardinal York (GB) 1804	Sir Peter Teazle; 1784	Highflyer	Rachel
Sire Cardinal York (GB) 1804	Sir Peter Teazle; 1784	Papillon	Snap
Sire Cardinal York (GB) 1804	Sir Peter Teazle; 1784	Papillon	Miss Cleveland
Sire Cardinal York (GB) 1804	Charmer; 1790	Phoenomenon	Herod
Sire Cardinal York (GB) 1804	Charmer; 1790	Phoenomenon	Frenzy
Sire Cardinal York (GB) 1804	Charmer; 1790	Fitz Herod mare	Fitz Herod
Sire Cardinal York (GB) 1804	Charmer; 1790	Fitz Herod mare	Young Cade mare
Dam Miss Nancy (GB) 1803	Whiskey; 1791	King Fergus	Eclipse
Dam Miss Nancy (GB) 1803	Whiskey; 1791	King Fergus	Creeping Molly
Dam Miss Nancy (GB) 1803	Whiskey; 1791	Fenwick's Herod mare	Herod
Dam Miss Nancy (GB) 1803	Whiskey; 1791	Fenwick's Herod mare	Pyrrha
Dam Miss Nancy (GB) 1803	Ruler mare 1791	Ruler	Young Marske
Dam Miss Nancy (GB) 1803	Ruler mare 1791	Ruler	Flora
Dam Miss Nancy (GB) 1803	Ruler mare 1791	Fitz Herod mare	Fitz Herod
Dam Miss Nancy (GB) 1803	Ruler mare 1791	Fitz Herod mare	Young Cade mare (Family:4)

- The Duchess was inbred 3 × 3 to the Fitz Herod mare, meaning that this mare appears twice in the third generation of his pedigree. The Fitz Herod's mare's grandsire Herod also appeared three times in the fourth generation of The Duchess's pedigree.
