= Rhoda (horse) =

British-bred Thoroughbred racehorse

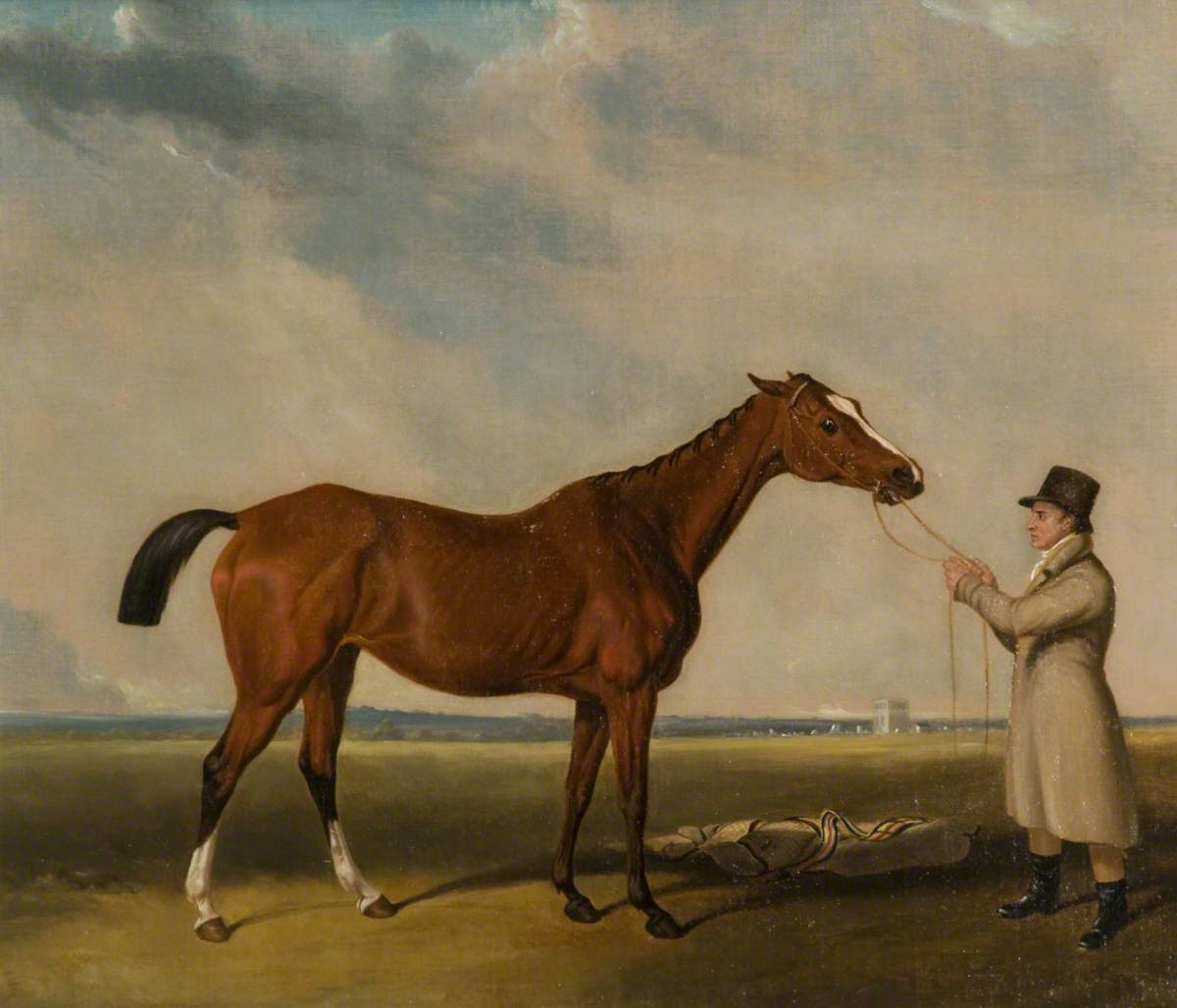
- Rhoda by Abraham Cooper.
- Sire: Asparagus
- Grandsire: Potoooooooo
- Dam: Rosabella
- Damsire: Whiskey
- Sex: Mare
- Foaled: 1813
- Country: United Kingdom
- Colour: Bay
- Breeder: John Manners, 5th Duke of Rutland
- Owner: 5th Duke of Rutland; J. Turner; H. Edwards
- Trainer: Dixon Boyce
- Record: 45:21-10-2

Major wins
- Match against Parrot (1816); 1000 Guineas (1816); Leicester Gold Cup (1817); King's Plate (Chelmsford) (1818); Chelmsford Gold Cup (1818); Wellington Stakes (1818); Northampton Gold Cup (1818); Leicester Burgesses' Plate (1818, 1819); Brighton Town Plate (1819); Northampton County Plate (1819); Chelmsford Stewards' Purse (1820); Northampton Town Plate (1820)

Rhoda (1813 – after 1836) was a British Thoroughbred racehorse and broodmare who won the third running of the classic 1000 Guineas at Newmarket Racecourse in 1816 and was the most successful racehorse in Britain (in terms of wins) two years later. Rhoda was one of the most active of all British classic winners, running in at least forty-five contests between 1816 and 1820 and winning twenty-one times. Her actual number of competitive races was even higher as many of her later races were run in multiple heats, with the prize going to the first horse to win twice. She won the 1000 Guineas on her second appearance but did not run as a three-year-old after finishing unplaced in the Oaks Stakes. Rhoda won three races in 1817, ten in 1818, four in 1819 and two in 1820.

== Background ==
Rhoda was a bay mare with a white blaze and white socks on her hind legs, bred by her owner John Manners, 5th Duke of Rutland. She was sired by Asparagus (a son of Potoooooooo) who was twenty-six years old when Rhoda was foaled, out of Rosabella a mare bred by the Duke of York. Rhoda's great-grand-dam Harriet is the direct female ancestor of all modern members of Thoroughbred family 22 including Mill Reef, Blushing Groom and Lammtarra. Rutland, a member of the Jockey Club, kept a small string of racehorses but had considerable success, winning The Derby with Cadland and the Oaks with Sorcery and Medora.

== Racing career ==
=== 1816: three-year-old season ===
Rhoda's racing career began at the Newmarket Craven meeting on 19 April 1816 when she was entered in a match race against a colt (later named Parrot) owned by Sir John Shelley. The colt was strongly favoured in the betting but Rhoda won the race over the Rowley Mile course to win a 300 guinea prize. At the First Spring meeting two weeks later Rhoda was one of six runners for the third running of the 1000 Guineas over the Ditch Mile course. Ridden by Sam Barnard, she won the classic at odds of 3/1, beating Lord Foley's filly Duenna with the favourite Guendolen in third.

On 31 May Rhoda was moved up in distance for the Oaks Stakes over one and a half miles at Epsom. She started the 10/1 fourth choice in the betting in a field of eleven. The race was won by Landscape from Duenna, with Rhoda among the unplaced runners. The Duke's filly did not race again in 1816.

=== 1817: four-year-old season ===
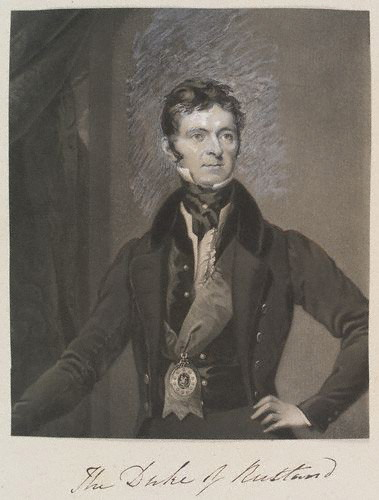
The Duke of Rutland, who bred and owned Rhoda

Rhoda made her first appearance for more than ten months when finishing unplaced in the Craven Stakes at Newmarket on 7 April. At the next Newmarket meeting she recorded her first win for a year when she won a ten-furlong handicap race in which she defeated the 1815 Oaks winner Minuet.

In June Rhoda ran twice at Ascot. On the opening day of the meeting she finished unplaced in an Oatlands Stakes and two days later contested her first race in heats in which she was opposed by a five-year-old horse named Garus. Rhoda won the first heat and collected the prize of £50 when her opponent was withdrawn second. At Chelmsford in Essex in July Rhoda was beaten by Duenna in a King's Plate and then finished fourth when carrying top weight of 130 pounds in a handicap two days later. Rhoda's third and final success of the season came on 17 September at Leicester where she won the local Gold Cup over three and a quarter miles.

Rhoda's remaining races of 1817 took place at Newmarket in autumn beginning at the First October meeting where she finished last of the four runners behind Bobadil in a subscription race. At the Second October meeting she was beaten in a match race over the Ditch Mile by Manfred, winner of that year's 2000 Guineas. On 28 October at the Houghton meeting Rhoda was moved down to sprint distances and finished second to The Duke in a five furlong handicap before ending the year by running second to Pendulum in the Audley End Stakes over one and three quarter miles two days later.

=== 1818: five-year-old season ===
Rhoda's most successful season began with three races at Newmarket in spring. She finished unplaced in an Oatlands Stakes in April, won a three-runner sweepstakes over ten furlongs two weeks later and then finished fourth of the five runners in a sweepstakes in May. She started favourite for a race at the Derby meeting at Epsom at the end of the same month, but was beaten into second place by Doctor Busby.

Over a period of three months, beginning in July Rhoda won nine times from ten races. At the Newmarket July meeting she won a claiming race over two miles, beating four opponents. Later than month she ran twice at Chelmsford, winning a 100 guinea King's Plate in three heats on the opening day of the meeting and the Chelmsford Gold Cup for another 100 guineas on the following afternoon. In August she was sent to race at Great Yarmouth Racecourse in Norfolk where she finished second to Lord Rous' colt Zenith in a Ladies' Plate.

On 3 September the mare appeared at Bedford where she won a £50 race in two four-mile heats. A week later at Northampton Rhoda ran three times in one day, beating four opponents in the Wellington Stakes over one and a half miles and then winning both heats of the Town Plate. Six days after her wins at Northampton Rhoda was sent to race at Leicester where she won both heats of a £70 race on the opening day of the meeting. On the following day she added the Burgess's Plate at the same course, winning two out of three heats. Rhoda returned to Newmarket in October and collected her sixth consecutive prize as she defeated Lord Jersey's horse Cannon-ball in a weight-for-age contest over the four mile Beacon Course. The mare's winning run came to an end at Newmarket on 30 October when she finished unplaced behind Lord Foley's colt Boniface in a ten furlong handicap, carrying top weight of 133 pounds.

Rhoda's 1818 record of ten wins in fifteen starts made her the most successful British racehorse of the year in terms of races won.

=== 1819: six-year-old season ===
Rhoda made her last appearance in the ownership of the Duke of Rutland in April 1819 when she finished third behind Boniface and The Duchess in a handicap at Newmarket. By the time she finished unplaced in the Epsom Gold Cup in May she had been sold and was racing in the colours of Mr W. Edwards. At the same meeting she was beaten by Lord Rous's colt Lepus in a £50 over three two-mile heats.

After a two-month break, Rhoda gained her first success for her new owner when she won the Town Plate at Brighton Racecourse in July. The mare had to race four times to take the prize, being beaten the first two heats before winning the next two. At the end of August Rhoda ran again at Bedford, and finished second in two races, both run in heats, carrying top weight on each occasion.

In September Rhoda took the County Plate at Northampton, beating Lord Warwick's colt Wouvermans in three heats. Later in the month, the mare arrived at Leicester, where she contested three races in two days. On the opening day of the meeting she finished second in the three and a quarter mile Leicester Gold Cup and then turned out again immediately to win a £70 race in three heats. On the following afternoon she won both heats of a £70 race in which she conceded at least twenty pounds to her opponents. Her season ended at Newmarket where she finished fourth in a King's Plate in October and sixth in a three-mile race on 2 November at the Houghton meeting.

=== 1820: seven-year-old season ===
By the start of the 1820 season, Rhoda had been sold again, and in her final season she raced in the colours of Mr H Edwards. She began the year at the Craven meeting, where she finished unplaced in a division of the Oatlands Stakes, carrying top weight of 124 pounds. In July at Chelmsford she ran in three heats of a 100 guinea King's Purse and finished third under a weight of 128 pounds behind Lord Clarendon's filly (later named Antiope) and the 1818 1000 Guineas and Oaks winner Corinne. Two days later in the Stewards' Purse, Rhoda won the second and third heats to claim a prize of £50. Later that summer Rhoda ended her career with a victory at Northampton Racecourse, where she won the Town Plate.

== Stud record ==
Rhoda was retired from racing to become a broodmare, first for Mr Turner and from 1823 for Mr Rush. She produced 11 foals and two sets of twins between 1821 and 1832. Notable offspring include Oatlands, sired by Tiresias, foaled in 1826 and Roadster, by McAdam (1828), who ran unplaced in the 1831 Derby. She did not produce a live foal after 1832 and was recorded as living in 1836, but had died by 1840.

== Pedigree ==
Pedigree of Rhoda (GB), bay mare, 1813
Sire Asparagus (GB) 1787	Potoooooooo; 1773	Eclipse	Marske
Sire Asparagus (GB) 1787	Potoooooooo; 1773	Eclipse	Spilletta
Sire Asparagus (GB) 1787	Potoooooooo; 1773	Sportsmistress	Sportsman
Sire Asparagus (GB) 1787	Potoooooooo; 1773	Sportsmistress	Golden Locks
Sire Asparagus (GB) 1787	Justice mare 1781	Justice	Herod
Sire Asparagus (GB) 1787	Justice mare 1781	Justice	Curiosity
Sire Asparagus (GB) 1787	Justice mare 1781	Marianne	Squirrel
Sire Asparagus (GB) 1787	Justice mare 1781	Marianne	Miss Meredith
Dam Rosabella (GB) 1803	Whiskey; 1789	Saltram	Eclipse
Dam Rosabella (GB) 1803	Whiskey; 1789	Saltram	Virago
Dam Rosabella (GB) 1803	Whiskey; 1789	Calash	Herod
Dam Rosabella (GB) 1803	Whiskey; 1789	Calash	Teresa
Dam Rosabella (GB) 1803	Diomed mare 1793	Diomed	Florizel
Dam Rosabella (GB) 1803	Diomed mare 1793	Diomed	sister to Juno
Dam Rosabella (GB) 1803	Diomed mare 1793	Harriet	Matchem
Dam Rosabella (GB) 1803	Diomed mare 1793	Harriet	Flora (Family 22)
