= Amato (horse) =

British-bred Thoroughbred racehorse

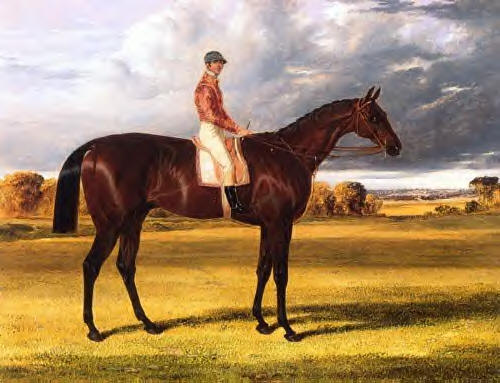
- Amato by J F Herring, Sr
- Sire: Velocipede
- Grandsire: Blacklock
- Dam: Jane Shore
- Damsire: Woful
- Sex: Stallion
- Foaled: 1835
- Country: United Kingdom of Great Britain and Ireland
- Colour: Brown bay
- Breeder: Sir Gilbert Heathcote
- Owner: Sir Gilbert Heathcote
- Trainer: Ralph Sherwood
- Record: 1: 1-0-0
- Earnings: £4, 005 (record for the time)

Major wins
- Derby Stakes (1838)
- Last updated on 10 November 2011

Amato (1835 – 27 January 1843) was an English bred, English trained thoroughbred racehorse who won the Derby Stakes in 1838 on his only racecourse appearance. He was then injured and retired undefeated.

== Breeding ==
Amato was a brown bay colt, bred on Epsom Downs by Sir Gilbert Heathcote in 1835, and was by Velocipede out of Jane Shore, by Woful out of Bella Dona (bred by the Duke of York in 1816), by Seymour. In his pedigree were notable thoroughbreds such as Perdita, Old Partner and Yellow Turk. At fifteen hands two inches Amato was on the small side and described as wiry.

== Racing career ==
The Epsom trained Amato ridden by Jem Chapple won the 1838 Derby Stakes. According to contemporary accounts the start of Amato’s Derby was an unsatisfactory one. Before the flag was finally lowered there were three breaks away and when the signal to ‘go’ arrived two horses were left at the start whilst several others were slowly away.

Epsom's undulating cambers suited Heathcote’s horse who led from the mile post coming home to win by a length from Ion, with Grey Momus three lengths third. At 33/1 Amato’s victory was unexpected and much celebrated by the team who helped him to victory.

== Local notoriety ==
Amato who was bred at The Durdans in Epsom by Heathcote and trained by local trainer Ralph Sherwood was a popular winner and today stands a public house, the ‘Amato Inn’ named in honour of the Derby winner. In a tradition going back 170 years the publican tips the winner of the Derby and displays the name for the race goers on the morning of The Derby

When Amato died in 1843 (Note: The source cited in Reference 1 gives Amato's death year as 1841, but the stone over his grave is authoritative.) Sir Gilbert Heathcote buried the body in the woods of his Epsom home, the Durdans. The stone marking the spot carries the simple inscription "AMATO - January 27th 1843".

He was painted by John Frederick Herring, Snr.

== Stud career ==
Amato appears to have had no success as a stallion and likely had fertility issues. The only record for Amato is under his dam Jane Shore, where in 1835 he is recorded as “brown colt by Velocipede”
