= Kisber (horse) =

Hungarian Thoroughbred racehorse

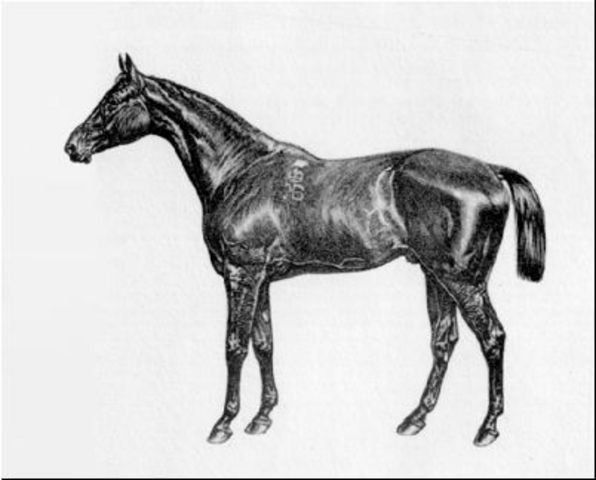
- Kisber, contemporary engraving
- Sire: Buccaneer
- Grandsire: Wild Dayrell
- Dam: Mineral
- Damsire: Rataplan
- Sex: Stallion
- Foaled: 1873
- Country: Hungary
- Colour: Bay
- Breeder: Hungarian Imperial Stud
- Owner: Alexander Baltazzi
- Trainer: Joseph Hayhoe
- Record: 7: 3-0-1
- Earnings: £

Major wins
- Dewhurst Stakes (1875); Epsom Derby (1876); Grand Prix de Paris (1876)

Honours
- Leading sire in Germany (1894, 1895, 1896)

Kisber (in English Kishber 1873–1895) was a Hungarian-bred Thoroughbred racehorse and sire. In a career that lasted from 1875 to 1876 he ran seven times and won three races. In the summer of 1876 he became the third of six horses to win both The Derby and the Grand Prix de Paris. He was the second foreign-bred horse, after Gladiateur in 1865, to win the Derby: he remains the only Hungarian-bred horse to do so. At the end of the season he was retired to stud.

== Background ==
Kisber was a powerfully built bay horse, bred at the Hungarian Imperial Stud from thoroughbreds which had been imported from England. His sire, Buccaneer, a member of the Byerley Turk sire line, had won several important races including the July Stakes and the Royal Hunt Cup. He sired several notable winners (including Formosa, a filly who won four British Classic Races in 1868) and was British British Champion sire in 1868 and 1869. By the time his efficacy as a stallion became apparent, however, he was no longer available to British breeders, having been exported to the Austro-Hungarian Empire in 1866. Kisber's dam, Mineral, was a daughter of the 1000 Guineas winner Manganese. Mineral won several minor races and, before her export to Hungary, produced the St Leger winner Wenlock.

Kisber was sent to the sales as a yearling and bought for approximately £500 by the Turkish-born brothers Alexander and Hector Baltazzi. He was sent into training in England with Joseph Hayhoe at his Palace House stable in Newmarket, Suffolk.

Until 1946, thoroughbreds were allowed to race in England without being officially named. The colt who would become Kisber raced unnamed as a two-year-old when he was known simply as "The Mineral Colt". Shortly before he ran in the Derby he was named in honour of his birthplace.

== Racing career ==
=== 1875: two-year-old season ===
As a two-year-old, Kisber showed outstanding ability in home gallops, including trial races in which he gave weight and decisive beatings to high-class stable companions. He took time to reproduce his home form in public however, and finished unplaced in the July Stakes and third in the Stetchworth Stakes in the summer of 1875.

In autumn, despite his lack of success, he was aimed at the most important two-year-old races at Newmarket. He was strongly fancied for the Middle Park Plate in October and was heavily backed by his owners. He failed again however, finishing unplaced behind Petrarch. Two weeks later, Kisber finally justified the confidence of his connections with a three-length win over Springfield in the inaugural running of the Dewhurst Stakes, enabling the Baltazzi brothers to win back the money they had lost on his previous races.

=== 1876: three-year-old season ===
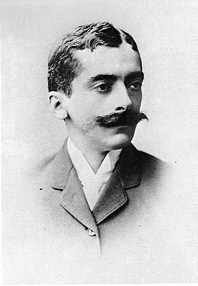
Alexander Baltazzi: Kisber ran in his name although the colt was owned jointly with his brother Hector

Kisber made good progress over the winter of 1875–1876 and was regarded as one of the leading contenders for the Derby. He did not run in any of the trial races or the 2000 Guineas however, and there were rumours that he would also miss the Derby. The rumours originated from the difficult financial position of his owners: the Baltazzi brothers were heavily in debt and it seemed possible that Kisber, as their most valuable asset, would be seized by their creditors. Eventually, the brothers managed to obtain further credit, enabling the colt to run in their colours at Epsom.

On 31 May he started 4/1 second favourite in a field of fifteen. Petrarch, who had won the 2000 Guineas was favourite at 2/1. Kisber broke quickly, but was then pulled back by Charles Maidment and raced towards the back of the field in the early stages. He turned into the straight in fifth place and moved up to challenge Petrarch for the lead just over a furlong out. Kisber quickly went clear as the favourite weakened and won very easily by five lengths from Forerunner. The Baltazzi brothers financial position was eased considerably: apart from the prize-money, they took an estimated £100,000 in winning bets.

A few days after his win at Epsom, Kisber was sent to Longchamp for the Grand Prix de Paris on 11 June, the most important race in France. Kisber started favourite for the 3000m race in front of a large and enthusiastic crowd which included the President of France. Following an investigation by the French racing officials it was declared that he would not be considered an English horse in the event of his victory. He produced a "wonderful" performance, leading for most of the way and winning very easily by five lengths from the Oaks winner Enguerrande. The win took his earnings for the year to £11,173.

On his final start Kisber was sent to Doncaster for the St Leger, for which he started 7/4 favourite against eight rivals despite rumours that he was having problems in training. He was certainly not impressive before the race, appearing heavily bandaged on all four legs. He ran prominently for much of the way but weakened abruptly in the straight and finished a remote fourth behind Petrarch. John Osbourne, who rode him in the race said "He was beaten before he even started". There was some dissatisfaction with the result from those who felt that Kisber had not shown his true form and that his owners had never intended him to win. According to one London correspondent, there were "suspicions of unfairness".

Kisber was entered in some major races in 1877, and was rumoured to be returning for a match race against Silvio in 1878, but he never ran again.

== Popular culture ==
The "Kisber" was the name given to one of the most fashionable bonnets of the summer of 1876.

== Stud career ==
Kisber was based at various studs in England from 1877 to 1886 when he was moved to the Baltazzi brothers stud at Napajedla in Moravia. Two years later he was moved to a stud in Bad Harzburg in Germany, where he remained for the rest of his life. He was Champion Sire in Germany in 1894, 1895 and 1896. His death was reported in 1895.

== Sire line tree ==
- Kisber
  - Kinsky
  - Crafton
    - Freak
    - Craftsman
    - Hulcot
  - Ducat
  - Harmattan
  - Hungarian
  - Arcadian
    - Flugschrift
  - Kaunitz
  - Sennor
  - Hardenberg
  - Realist
    - Real Scotch
  - Ausmarker
  - Sperber
  - Asche
  - Trollhetta
  - Undolf
  - Steinbock
  - Altgold
  - Sperber's Bruder
  - Imm

== Pedigree ==
Pedigree of Kisber (HUN), bay stallion, 1873
Sire Buccaneer (GB) 1857	Wild Dayrell; 1852	Ion	Cain
Sire Buccaneer (GB) 1857	Wild Dayrell; 1852	Ion	Margaret
Sire Buccaneer (GB) 1857	Wild Dayrell; 1852	Ellen Middleton	Bay Middleton
Sire Buccaneer (GB) 1857	Wild Dayrell; 1852	Ellen Middleton	Myrrha
Sire Buccaneer (GB) 1857	Little Red Rover mare 1841	Little Red Rover	Tramp
Sire Buccaneer (GB) 1857	Little Red Rover mare 1841	Little Red Rover	Miss Syntax
Sire Buccaneer (GB) 1857	Little Red Rover mare 1841	Eclat	Edmund
Sire Buccaneer (GB) 1857	Little Red Rover mare 1841	Eclat	Squib
Dam Mineral (GB) 1863	Rataplan; 1850	The Baron	Birdcatcher
Dam Mineral (GB) 1863	Rataplan; 1850	The Baron	Echidna
Dam Mineral (GB) 1863	Rataplan; 1850	Pocahontas	Glencoe
Dam Mineral (GB) 1863	Rataplan; 1850	Pocahontas	Marpessa
Dam Mineral (GB) 1863	Manganese; 1853	Birdcatcher	Sir Hercules
Dam Mineral (GB) 1863	Manganese; 1853	Birdcatcher	Guiccioli
Dam Mineral (GB) 1863	Manganese; 1853	Moonbeam	Tomboy
Dam Mineral (GB) 1863	Manganese; 1853	Moonbeam	Lunatic (Family: 4-c)
