= Chamant (horse) =

French-bred Thoroughbred racehorse

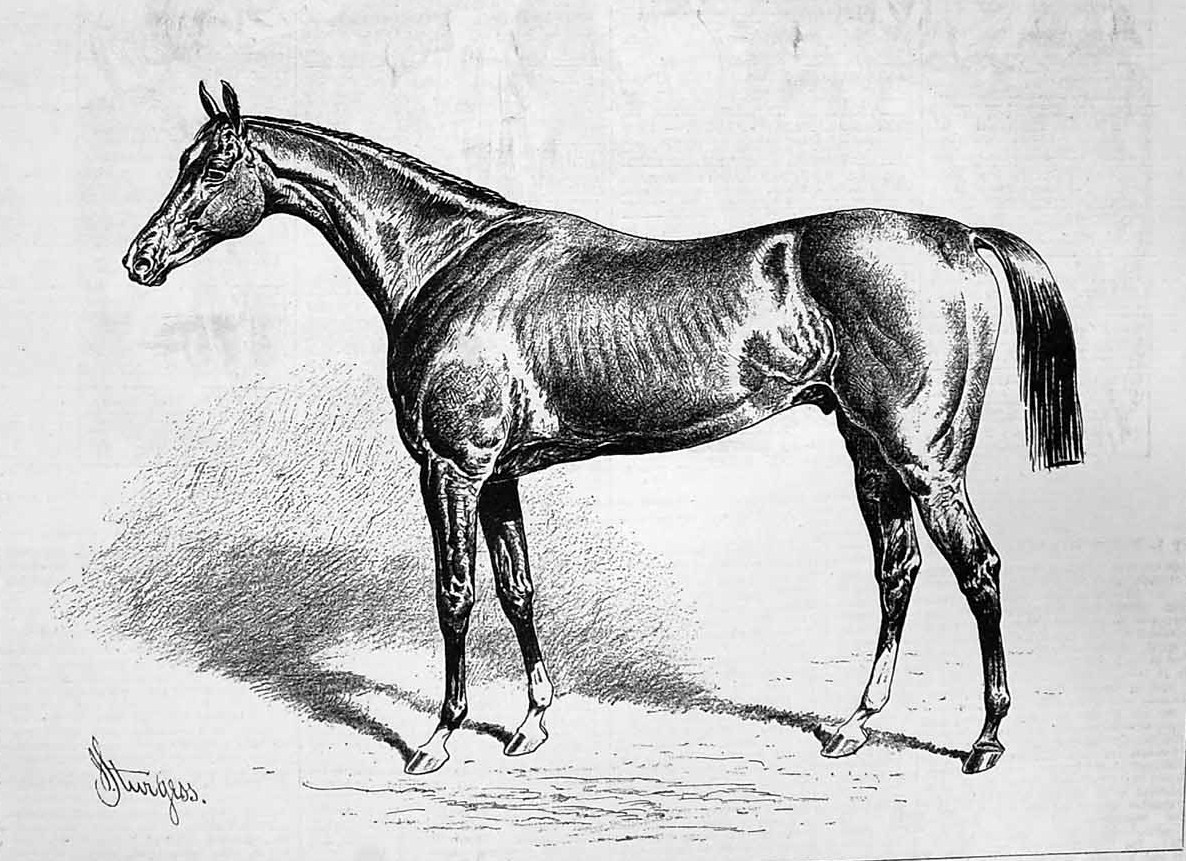
- Chamant in May 1877, by John Sturgess
- Sire: Mortemer
- Grandsire: Compiegne
- Dam: Araucaria
- Damsire: Ambrose
- Sex: Stallion
- Foaled: 1874
- Country: France
- Colour: Bay
- Breeder: Frederic de Lagrange
- Owner: Frederic de Lagrange
- Trainer: Thomas Jennings
- Record: 11:5-1-1
- Earnings: £11,105

Major wins
- Middle Park Plate (1876); Dewhurst Stakes (1876); 2000 Guineas (1877)

Awards
- Leading sire in Germany (1885, 1886, 1887, 1890, 1891, 1892, 1897)

Chamant (1874–1898) was a French-bred, British-trained Thoroughbred racehorse and sire who won the classic 2000 Guineas in 1877. In a career that lasted from July 1876 to May 1877 he ran eleven times and won five races. In 1876, Chamant won one of his first six races, but showed improved form at Newmarket in autumn when he won both the Middle Park Stakes and the Dewhurst Stakes. In 1877, Chamant won the 2000 Guineas and started second favourite for The Derby despite being found to be lame before the race. He finished unplaced behind Silvio, aggravating a back injury which ended his racing career. He later became a successful stallion in Germany.

== Background ==
Chamant was a bay horse bred at the Haras Dangu stud of his owner Comte Frederic de Lagrange. Lagrange had extensive racing and breeding interests on both sides of the English Channel in partnership with his compatriot Claude Joachim Lefèvre. Chamant was sired by Mortemer, a French-bred horse who won the Ascot Gold Cup for Lefevre in 1871. Chamant's dam, Araucaria, was a daughter of Pocahontas, the foundation mare of Thoroughbred family 3-n. Araucaria was an important broodmare in her own right: apart from Chamant she produced the St Leger winner Rayon d'Or and the 1000 Guineas winner Camelia.

Like his sire Mortemer, Chamant was named after a village in Picardy. Lagrange sent the colt to his private trainer Thomas Jennings at his Phantom House stable at Newmarket, Suffolk.

== Racing career ==
=== 1876: two-year-old season ===
Chamant arrived at Jennings' yard from France in June 1876, and it was some time before the trainer could bring him to peak condition. Despite not yet being fully fit, he began his racing career shortly afterwards, when he finished unplaced behind Warren Hastings in the July Stakes. He then finished second in the Lavant Stakes at Goodwood before being sent to compete at Lewes Racecourse where he ran twice. After finishing unplaced behind the filly Placida in the Astley Stakes he recorded his first win in the £465 Priory Stakes.

At Doncaster in September, Chamant finished unplaced behind the filly Lady Golightly in the Champagne Stakes and third in another race at the same meeting. At Newmarket in October, Lagrange's colt started a 20/1 outsider for the year's most valuable two-year-old race, the six furlong Middle Park Plate, for which Lady Golightly was made 2/1 favourite. In a closely contested finish, Chamant won by a head from Pelegrino, just ahead of Plunger and Lady Golightly. According to press reports, he was "brilliantly ridden" by Jem Goater, but many observers considered the result to be a "fluke". Later that month Chamant, ridden again by Goater, started 9/4 for the seven furlong Dewhurst Stakes. Despite carrying a five pound weight penalty for winning the Middle Park Plate, he won impressively from Plunger to establish himself as the best two-year-old seen in Britain that season.

Chamant's earnings of £5,930 made him the third most successful horse of 1876 in Britain, behind the three-year-old classic winners Petrarch and Kisber. The success of Chamant, and other horses owned by Lagrange, led Lord Falmouth (the owner of Lady Golightly) to call for foreign horses to be banned from competing in British races. Falmouth unsuccessfully took his proposal to a general meeting of the Jockey Club in 1877.

=== 1877: three-year-old season ===
Chamant reportedly thrived over the winter and by early 1877, the French colt was favourite for both the 2000 Guineas and the Derby, at odds of 3/1 and 6/1 respectively. On his first appearance of the season, Chamant was allowed to walk over at a race at Newmarket in April when the other entries were withdrawn by their owners. Following a large gamble on a previously unraced colt named Morier, Chamant started 9/4 second favourite in a field of eleven runners for the 2000 Guineas over the Rowley Mile course on 2 May. Ridden by Goater, Chamant tracked the leaders before taking the lead at half way. He was never seriously challenged and won with "consummate ease" from the American-bred Brown Prince with Lord Falmouth's Silvio in third. A telegram reporting the result to Australia became so garbled that it was interpreted as referring to the ongoing Russo-Turkish War and newspapers described an action in which 2,000 men were led to victory by "Chamat Croun" and "Prince Silvio".

Four weeks later, Chamant faced sixteen opponents in the Derby at Epsom, and started second favourite behind Rob Roy. He had been favourite for the race for months, but his appearance in the paddock before the race caused serious concern, as he was seen to be lame in his hock. Lagrange was advised to withdraw the colt but decided to allow him to run. The odds against the French horse fluctuated wildly in the half-hour before the race, drifting from 6/4 to 20/1 before settling at 4/1. Chamant was not among the early leaders but improved to fourth place at half way. In the straight he briefly looked likely to challenge the leaders, but weakened in the final furlong and finished tenth behind Silvio.

A back injury sustained in the 2000 Guineas had deteriorated throughout the season and by autumn the horse was also beginning to develop respiratory trouble which may have been a form of Roarer Syndrome. Despite his problems, Chamant was still strongly fancied for the St Leger, but he never raced again and was retired to stud at the end of the season. In December 1877, Chamant was put up for auction at Tattersalls but was not sold as he failed to reach his reserve price of £6,000.

== Stud career ==
Chamant began his stud career at the Haras Dangu, but after a single covering season he was sold for £4,000 and exported to stand as a stallion at the German Imperial Stud at Graditz. He remained at Graditz until 1892 when he was moved to another Imperial Stud at Beberbeck where he lived for six years before dying of heart disease in 1898.

Chamant sired three winners of the Deutsches Derby (Potrimpos, Peter and Habenichts) five winners of the Mehl-Mulhens-Rennen (German 2000 Guineas) and was the leading sire in Germany on six occasions. Apart from his success with Thoroughbreds, Chamant was also influential in the development of the Trakehner breed.

== Sire line tree ==
- Chamant
  - Weltmann
    - Glocknerin
  - Andernach
  - Cicero
  - Picollos
  - Triftig
  - Dorn
    - Don Jose
  - Potrimpos
    - Birkhahn
    - Wels
  - Hartenfels
  - Pumpernickel
    - Athanus
    - Flunkermichel
    - Wolkenschieber
    - Scharb
    - Romito
  - Hortari
  - Panther
    - Roemer
  - Peter
    - St Pierre
  - Walvater
  - Lehnsherr
    - Emporer
  - Milchmann
  - Almenrausch
  - Geranium
  - Saphir
    - Michael
    - Baron
    - Bengali
    - Signor
    - Granit
    - Hapsburg
    - Normanne
    - Slicker
    - Desir
    - For Ever
    - Sokrat
    - Royal Blue
    - Roi Soleil
    - Marmor
    - Skarabae
  - Habenichts
    - Pathos
  - Vollmond
    - Girlamund
    - Pas de Quartre
    - Preller
  - Pomp
  - Letzter Mohikaner

== Pedigree ==
Pedigree of Chamant (FR), bay stallion, 1874
Sire Mortemer (FR) 1865	Compiegne; 1858	Fitz Gladiator	Gladiator
Sire Mortemer (FR) 1865	Compiegne; 1858	Fitz Gladiator	Zarah
Sire Mortemer (FR) 1865	Compiegne; 1858	Maid of Hart	The Provost
Sire Mortemer (FR) 1865	Compiegne; 1858	Maid of Hart	Martha Lynn
Sire Mortemer (FR) 1865	Comtesse; 1855	Nuncio	Plenipotentiary
Sire Mortemer (FR) 1865	Comtesse; 1855	Nuncio	Ally
Sire Mortemer (FR) 1865	Comtesse; 1855	Eusebio	Emilius
Sire Mortemer (FR) 1865	Comtesse; 1855	Eusebio	Mangel-Wurzel
Dam Araucaria (GB) 1862	Ambrose; 1849	Touchstone	Camel
Dam Araucaria (GB) 1862	Ambrose; 1849	Touchstone	Banter
Dam Araucaria (GB) 1862	Ambrose; 1849	Annette	Priam
Dam Araucaria (GB) 1862	Ambrose; 1849	Annette	Don Juan mare
Dam Araucaria (GB) 1862	Pocahontas; 1837	Glencoe	Sultan
Dam Araucaria (GB) 1862	Pocahontas; 1837	Glencoe	Trampoline
Dam Araucaria (GB) 1862	Pocahontas; 1837	Marpessa	Muley
Dam Araucaria (GB) 1862	Pocahontas; 1837	Marpessa	Clare (Family:3-n)
