= Buccaneer (horse) =

British Thoroughbred racehorse

- Sire: Wild Dayrell
- Grandsire: Ion
- Dam: Little Red Rover mare
- Damsire: Little Red Rover
- Sex: Stallion
- Foaled: 1857
- Country: Great Britain
- Colour: Bay
- Record: 19:11-3-0

Honours
- Leading sire in Great Britain: 1868; Leading sire in Germany: 1875, 1876, 1878, 1880
- Last updated on 23 March 2024

Buccaneer (1857 – 1887) was a Thoroughbred racehorse and champion sire in Great Britain, Austria-Hungary, and Germany. He was a dominant stallion at an important time in the development of horse racing in central Europe.

== Background ==
Buccaneer was a bay horse. His sire was Wild Dayrell, of which through his lineage continued the Sir Paul branch of the Sir Peter Teazle direct sire line.

== Racing career ==
Buccaneer raced from 1859 through 1862. In 1859, he won four of five starts, including the last four consecutively. The following year he won two of six starts. In 1861, he won four consecutive starts, and started seven races that year. He finished his racing career in 1862 by winning the Trial Stakes at Salisbury.

== Stud record ==
Buccaneer was a champion sire for Great Britain, Austria-Hungary, and Germany.

In England, Buccaneer produced Formosa and Brigantine, both classic race winners, and other good runners, including See Saw, and Paul Jones. In Austria-Hungary he produced winners Cadet and Kisber, while in Germany, he produced winner Flibustier.

He sired fourteen Derby winners: nine in Austria-Hungary, three in Germany, and one each in England and Poland. His progeny won thirty-seven classic races, and he became a Champion Sire and Broodmare Sire.

== Sire line tree ==
- Buccaneer
  - Captain Kidd
  - Pirate Chief
  - Michael-De-Basco
  - Paul Jones
    - Paul's Cray
    - Gunboat
  - See Saw
    - Cradle
    - Discord
    - Cylinder
    - Master Waller
    - Bruce
      - Sledge
      - Chapeau Chinois
    - Despair
      - Bentworth
      - Comfrey
    - Sortie
    - Acrostic
    - Little Duck
      - Perdican
      - Arelequin
      - Champaubert
        - Friant
      - Canvas Back
      - Gosbeck
      - Canard
    - Castanet
    - Dog Rose
    - Loved One
      - Dinna Forget
        - Dinneford
    - Ocean Wave
    - Upset
    - Dazzle
  - Black Flag
  - Lopez
  - Ventnor
  - Brigand
  - Cadet
  - Flibustier
    - Tschungatai
    - Trachenberg
      - Hannibal
        - Barkas
        - Hamilkar
        - Kolibri
        - Mandarin
        - Nordlandfaher
        - Sirocco
        - Lichtblick
        - Ganges
        - Phosphor
        - Dietrich Von Bern
        - Fels
          - Laland
            - Mio Darezzo
              - Mioland
        - Jauchzer
        - Sieger
        - Arnfried
        - Cathago
        - Hornist
        - Littoral
        - Mondstein
        - Gulliver
    - Architekt
    - Fledermaus
    - Freimaurer
  - Falscapa
  - Gamecock
  - Young Buccaneer
  - Waisenknabe
    - Lehetetian
    - Stronzian
      - Aspirant
        - Slusohr
  - Kisber
    - Kinsky
    - Crafton
      - Freak
      - Craftsman
      - Hulcot
    - Ducat
    - Harmattan
    - Hungarian
    - Arcadian
      - Flugschrift
    - Kaunitz
    - Sennor
    - Hardenberg
    - Realist
      - Real Scotch
    - Ausmarker
    - Sperber
    - Asche
    - Trollhetta
    - Undolf
    - Steinbock
    - Altgold
    - Sperber's Bruder
    - Imm
  - Bibor
  - Good Hope
    - Good Boy
    - Tambour-Major
  - Good Morning
  - Vordermann
  - Pirat
  - Tallos
  - Kisber-Ocscse
    - Inaska
  - Nil Desperandum
  - Picklock
  - Elemer
  - Florian
  - Balvany
    - Kozma
  - Landlord
  - Vederemo
  - Grand Buccaneer
  - Vinea
  - Fenek
  - Talpra Magyar
    - Tokio
      - Mokan
    - Xamete

== Pedigree ==
Pedigree of Buccaneer (GB), bay stallion, 1857
Sire Wild Dayrell b. 1852	Ion br. 1835	Cain b. 1822	Paulowitz
Sire Wild Dayrell b. 1852	Ion br. 1835	Cain b. 1822	Paynator mare
Sire Wild Dayrell b. 1852	Ion br. 1835	Margaret br. 1831	Edmund*
Sire Wild Dayrell b. 1852	Ion br. 1835	Margaret br. 1831	Medora
Sire Wild Dayrell b. 1852	Ellen Middleton b. 1846	Bay Middleton; 1833	Sultan
Sire Wild Dayrell b. 1852	Ellen Middleton b. 1846	Bay Middleton; 1833	Cobweb
Sire Wild Dayrell b. 1852	Ellen Middleton b. 1846	Myrrha; 1831	Malek
Sire Wild Dayrell b. 1852	Ellen Middleton b. 1846	Myrrha; 1831	Bessy
Dam Little Red Rover mare b. 1841	Little Red Rover b. 1827	Tramp; 1810	Dick Andrews
Dam Little Red Rover mare b. 1841	Little Red Rover b. 1827	Tramp; 1810	Gohanna mare
Dam Little Red Rover mare b. 1841	Little Red Rover b. 1827	Miss Syntax; 1814	Paynator
Dam Little Red Rover mare b. 1841	Little Red Rover b. 1827	Miss Syntax; 1814	Beningbrough mare
Dam Little Red Rover mare b. 1841	Eclat ch. 1830	Edmund*; 1824	Orville
Dam Little Red Rover mare b. 1841	Eclat ch. 1830	Edmund*; 1824	Emmeline
Dam Little Red Rover mare b. 1841	Eclat ch. 1830	Squib; 1820	Soothsayer
Dam Little Red Rover mare b. 1841	Eclat ch. 1830	Squib; 1820	Berenice

* Buccaneer is inbred 4S x 3D to the stallion Edmund, meaning that he appears fourth generation on the sire side of his pedigree and third generation on the dam side of his pedigree.
