= Ard Patrick =

British-bred Thoroughbred racehorse

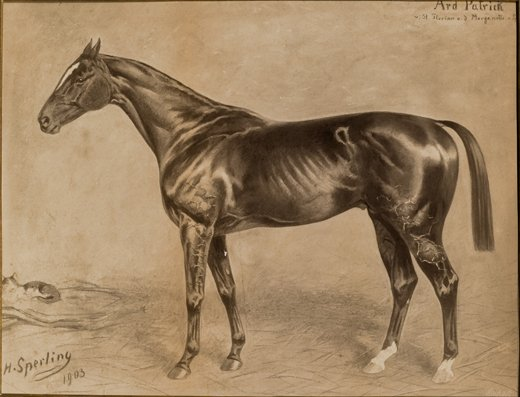
- Ard Patrick. Lithograph after H. Sperling
- Sire: St. Florian
- Grandsire: St. Simon
- Dam: Morganette
- Damsire: Springfield
- Sex: Stallion
- Foaled: 1899
- Country: Ireland
- Colour: Brown
- Breeder: John Gubbins
- Owner: John Gubbins
- Trainer: Samuel Darling
- Record: 11:6-3-2
- Earnings: £26,616

Major wins
- Imperial Produce Stakes (1901); Epsom Derby (1902); Prince of Wales's Stakes (1902); Princess of Wales's Stakes (1903); Eclipse Stakes (1903)

Awards
- Leading sire in Germany (1911, 1913, 1914)
- Last updated on 12 June 2011

Ard Patrick (1899–1923) was an Irish-bred, British-trained Thoroughbred racehorse and sire. One of the leading two-year-olds of 1901, he improved in 1902 to win The Derby, defeating the filly Sceptre. He returned from Injury problems to record his most important success when he defeated Sceptre and the Derby winner Rock Sand in the 1903 Eclipse Stakes at Sandown Park Racecourse. He was then retired from racing and exported to Germany, where he became a successful sire of winners.

== Background ==
Ard Patrick was an exceptionally big brown horse, reportedly standing 17 hands high, who was bred by his owner John Gubbins at his Knockany Stud near Bruree, County Limerick, Ireland, (at that time part of the United Kingdom of Great Britain and Ireland) and named after the nearby village of Ardpatrick (Ard Pádraig). He was sired by St Florian, a well-bred horse by St Simon, who had an unremarkable record as a racehorse and a sire. He was a member of Thoroughbred Family Number 20, which had a poor record of producing breeding stallions then. His dam, Morganette, by Springfield, was a roarer and did not advance beyond selling plates in her racing career, but proved an excellent broodmare. Before giving birth to Ard Patrick, she had produced Galtee More, who won the Triple Crown in 1897, and Blairfinde, a winner of the Irish Derby.

Gubbins sent his colt into training with Sam Darling at Beckhampton in Wiltshire.

== Racing record ==
=== 1901: two-year-old season ===
Ard Patrick was a "powerful and massively-built youngster" who was slow to mature and did not appear on the racecourse before autumn. He made his debut in one of the season's most valuable juvenile races, the six furlong Imperial Produce Stakes at Kempton on 12 October. Carrying 119 pounds, he won by a head from Royal Lancer, who was carrying three pounds more. Four days later, he met Royal Lancer again in the Clearwell Stakes at Newmarket, where he won by a neck and received three pounds. On his third and final start of the year, he finished second to the black filly Game Chick in the Dewhurst Stakes. At the end of the season, Ard Patrick was being offered by the bookmakers at odds of 7/1 for the following year's Derby, the other leading fancies being Duke of Westminster (the horse, not the owner) and William Collins Whitney's American import Nasturtium.

=== 1902: three-year-old season ===
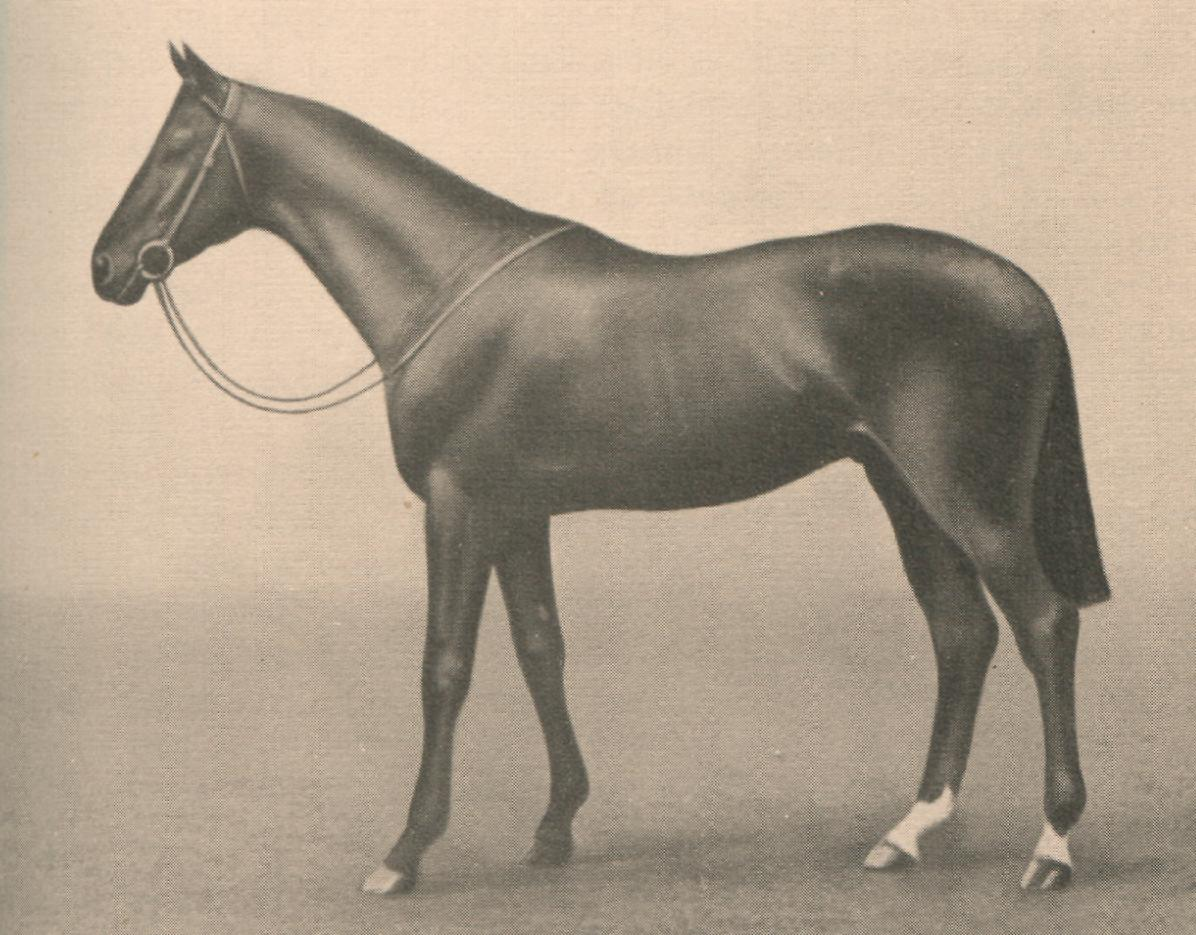
Ard Patrick as a three-year-old

According to press reports, Gubbins turned down an offer of 20,000 guineas for his colt from an unnamed source. As a three-year-old, Ard Patrick was slow to reach peak fitness. In the 2000 Guineas at Newmarket on 30 April, he was ridden by Kempton Cannon and started at odds of 9/2 in a field of fourteen runners behind the joint favourites Sceptre and Duke of Westminster. Sceptre won the race in a record time of 1:39.0, beating Pistol by two lengths with Ard Patrick a further three lengths back in third. He then finished second in a Three-year-old Plate over one mile at Kempton, in which he attempted to concede twenty-two pounds to Royal Ivy and was beaten two lengths. On his final start before the Derby, Ard Patrick finished first in the Newmarket Stakes on 14 May, beating Fowling Piece by a head, but was disqualified for "bumping and boring" and relegated to third place behind Fowling Piece and Royal Lancer. He had looked likely to win easily before struggling and drifting from a straight course in the last fifty yards, leading some to question the colt's attitude.

At Epsom Downs Racecourse on 4 June, Ard Patrick was ridden by the American jockey John "Skeets" Martin and started at odds of 100/14 for the Derby in a field of eighteen runners. Sceptre, who had also won the 1000 Guineas, started even favourite, having been the subject of an unprecedented gamble which saw her backed to win over half a million pounds. The King and Queen were in attendance for the "Coronation" Derby, but the crowd was smaller than usual due to heavy rain. From the start, Ard Patrick was in the leading group and went to the front just after halfway, followed by Sceptre, Rising Glass and Csardas. Ard Patrick pulled clear in the straight and won easily by three lengths from Rising Glass, with Friar Tuck third and Sceptre fourth. According to "Robin Hood" in The Australasian Ard Patrick confounded those critics who had questioned his temperament as he "finished like a lion and as straight as an arrow."

The remainder of Ard Patrick's three-year-old campaign was disappointing as he failed to reproduce his Epsom form. At Royal Ascot on 17 June, he started 11/10 favourite for the thirteen furlong Prince of Wales's Stakes in which he was required to concede weight to seven opponents. The Duke of Westminster's Cupbearer, who was receiving thirteen pounds from the Derby winner, won the race by three-quarters of a length from Ard Patrick, but was disqualified for "bumping and boring" the runner-up and placed last after an objection. Ard Patrick then developed leg trouble and was withdrawn from the Eclipse Stakes, which was won by Cheers, a colt he had beaten at Epsom and Ascot. He also missed the St Leger, his intended autumn target, which was won in his absence by Sceptre. Ard Patrick returned on 1 October for the £10,000 Jockey Club Stakes over one and three-quarter miles at Newmarket. Carrying 131 pounds, he finished third to Rising Glass (119 pounds) and the four-year-old Templemore (122).

=== 1903: four-year-old season ===
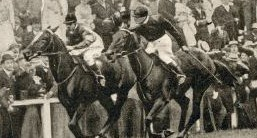
The finish of the 1903 Eclipse Stakes: Ard Patrick beats Sceptre

Before the start of the 1903 season, Gubbins reportedly turned down an offer of £15,000 for Ard Patrick from Samuel S. Brown of Pittsburgh. Ard Patrick showed his best form in two races as a four-year-old. He first appeared on 1 July in the £10,000 Princess of Wales's Stakes at Newmarket. He conceded weight to his opponents and won "in a canter" from Royal Lancer and Cheers. Before his next race, Ard Patrick was sold as a prospective stallion to Count Lehndorff, acting for the German government, for £21,000, although a condition of the sale was that he would run in Gubbins' colours in his remaining races.

The 1903 Eclipse Stakes at Sandown on 17 July was one of the most anticipated British races of the early 20th century, with Ard Patrick and Sceptre facing that year's Epsom Derby winner, Rock Sand. The race thus brought together "the three best horses in England", and perhaps "the most valuable field of horses that ever started in a race in any part of the world". The King was among the immense crowd drawn to Sandown for the "Battle of Giants". The odds at the start were 5/4 Rock Sand, 7/4 Sceptre and 5/1 Ard Patrick. Ard Patrick was settled in third behind Rock Sand in the early stages by his rider Herbert "Otto" Madden, before going to the front and leading into the straight. As Rock Sand weakened, Sceptre emerged as the only challenger and looked the likely winner a furlong from the finish, but Ard Patrick rallied and got the better of a "desperate finish" to win by a neck with Rock Sand three lengths away in third. The contest was favourably compared to the race for the 1887 Hardwicke Stakes between Ormonde, Minting and Bendigo. This was the second time in three attempts that Ard Patrick had beaten Sceptre.

A rematch between Ard Patrick, Sceptre and Rock Sand was expected in the Jockey Club Stakes, but Ard Patrick's leg problems recurred and he never raced again.

== Assessment ==
In their book A Century of Champions, John Randall and Tony Morris rated Ard Patrick a "great" Derby winner and the twentieth best British-trained racehorse of the 20th Century. The authors described Ard Patrick as "the greatest unsung hero of British Flat racing."

== Stud record ==
Retired to stud duty, he was the Leading sire in Germany three times and notably sired Deutsches Derby winner, Ariel, the successful mare Antwort and the dams of Herold and Alchemist. On 5 April 1923, it was reported that Ard Patrick had died after failing to recover from the effects of an experimental procedure known as a "Steinach rejuvenation operation".

== Sire line tree ==
- Ard Patrick
  - Anklang
  - Huon
    - Billy Barton
    - Dolan
  - Lapis Lazuli
  - Marabou
  - Lucullus
    - Pompey
    - Master Doon
    - Glendowie
    - King Lu
  - Dolomit
  - Octopus
  - Ariel
    - Revolutionar
    - Monfalcone
  - Terminus

== Pedigree ==
Pedigree of Ard Patrick (IRE), bay or brown stallion, 1899
Sire St Florian (GB) 1891	St Simon; 1881	Galopin	Vedette
Sire St Florian (GB) 1891	St Simon; 1881	Galopin	Flying Duchess
Sire St Florian (GB) 1891	St Simon; 1881	St Angela	King Tom
Sire St Florian (GB) 1891	St Simon; 1881	St Angela	Adeline
Sire St Florian (GB) 1891	Palmflower; 1874	The Palmer	Beadsman
Sire St Florian (GB) 1891	Palmflower; 1874	The Palmer	Madame Eglentine^
Sire St Florian (GB) 1891	Palmflower; 1874	Jenny Diver	Buccaneer
Sire St Florian (GB) 1891	Palmflower; 1874	Jenny Diver	Fairy
Dam Morganette (IRE) 1884	Springfield; 1873	St Albans	Stockwell
Dam Morganette (IRE) 1884	Springfield; 1873	St Albans	Bribery
Dam Morganette (IRE) 1884	Springfield; 1873	Viridis	Marsyas
Dam Morganette (IRE) 1884	Springfield; 1873	Viridis	Maid of Palmyra
Dam Morganette (IRE) 1884	Lady Morgan; 1868	Thormanby	Windhound
Dam Morganette (IRE) 1884	Lady Morgan; 1868	Thormanby	Alice Hawthorn
Dam Morganette (IRE) 1884	Lady Morgan; 1868	Morgan La Faye	Cowl*^
Dam Morganette (IRE) 1884	Lady Morgan; 1868	Morgan La Faye	Miami (Family: 5-j)

*^ Ard Patrick is inbred 5S x 4D to the stallion Cowl, meaning that he appears fifth generation (via Madame Eglentine)^ on the sire side of his pedigree and fourth generation on the dam side of his pedigree.
