= Galtee More =

Racehorse

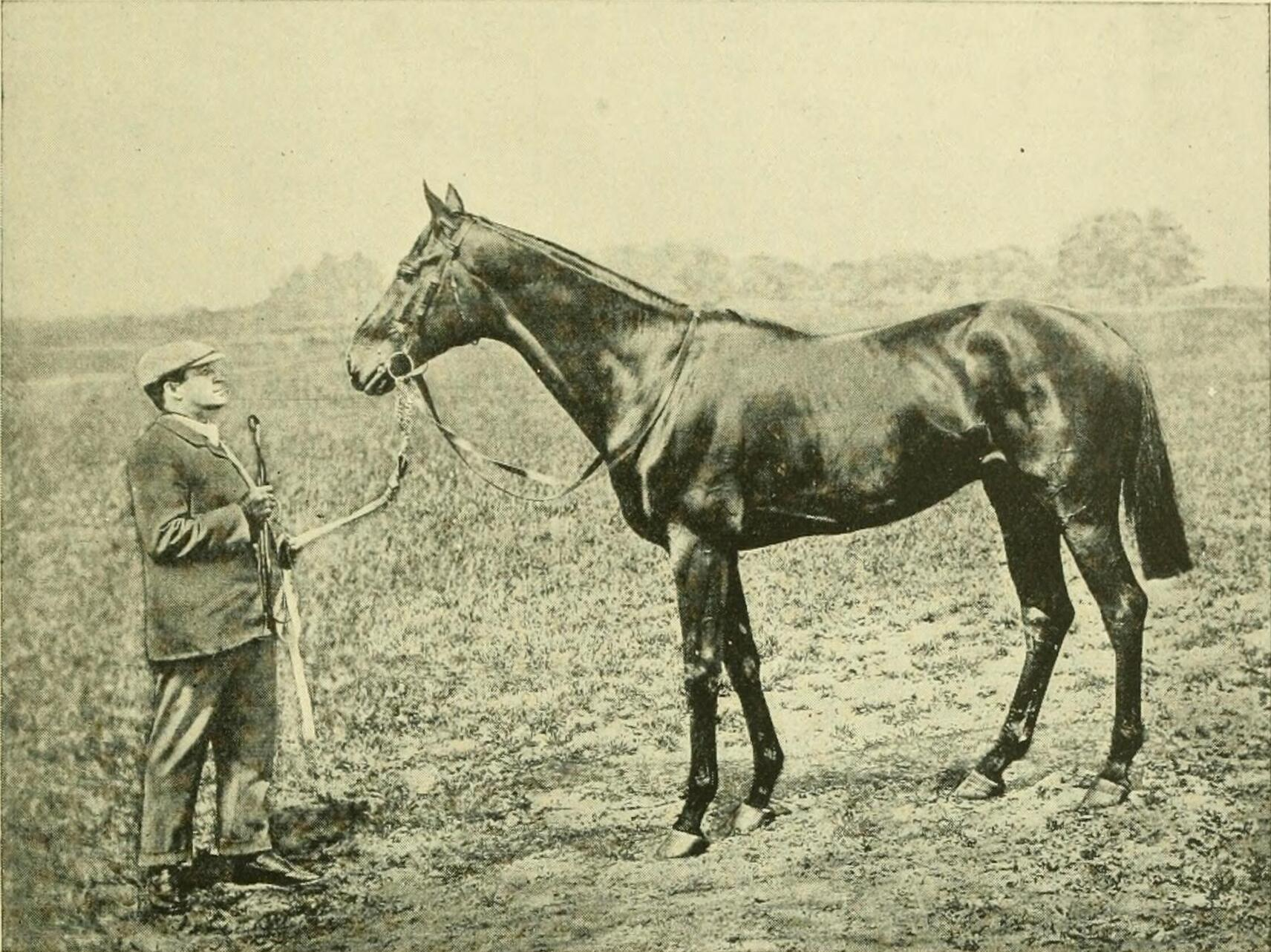
- From Royal Ascot; its history & its associations (1902)
- Sire: Kendal
- Grandsire: Bend Or
- Dam: Morganette
- Damsire: Springfield
- Sex: Stallion
- Foaled: 1894
- Country: Ireland
- Colour: Bay
- Breeder: John Gubbins
- Owner: John Gubbins
- Trainer: Sam Darling
- Record: 13: 11-1-0
- Earnings: £27,019

Major wins
- Molecomb Stakes (1896); Middle Park Plate (1896); 2000 Guineas (1897); Epsom Derby (1897); Prince of Wales's Stakes (1897); St Leger (1897)

Awards
- Leading sire in Germany (1910)

Galtee More (1894-30 January 1917) was an Irish-bred, British-trained Thoroughbred racehorse and sire. In a career that lasted from 1896 to 1897 he ran thirteen times and won eleven races. As a three-year-old in 1897 he became the seventh horse to win the English Triple Crown by winning the 2000 Guineas at Newmarket, the Derby at Epsom and the St Leger at Doncaster. At the end of the season he was sold to the Russian government and went on to have a successful stud career in Russia and Germany. He died following an accident in 1917.

== Background ==
Galtee More, a big bay horse of “almost faultless conformation” was bred by his owner John Gubbins at his Knockany Stud near Bruree, County Limerick. His sire Kendal had been a leading two-year-old in 1885 before his racing career was ended by injury. He went on to become a leading sire in both Britain and Argentina: thanks to Galtee More's exploits he was British Champion Sire in 1897. Galtee More's dam, Morganette, was of little use as a racehorse but became an outstanding broodmare, producing a second Derby winner in Ard Patrick. Gubbins named the colt after Galtymore (Cnoc Mór na nGaibhlte), a mountain on the border of Limerick and County Tipperary.

Galtee More was sent to England to be trained by Sam Darling at Beckhampton, Wiltshire. He was ridden in his Triple Crown races by Charles Wood who won the Championship in 1887. Wood was a controversial figure who was “warned off” (banned from racing) for almost nine years before returning to partner Galtee More. After his successes in 1897, Wood was asked to explain what things were needed to win a Derby: he replied, "a saddle, a bridle and a good horse."

== Racing career ==
=== 1896: two-year-old season ===
Galtee More made his debut in July when he beat the odds-on favourite Minstrel in the Hurstbourne Stakes at Stockbridge. On his next start he suffered his only defeat as a two-year-old when he dead heated with Glencally (who was receiving eight pounds) for second place, a short head behind Brigg (receiving two pounds) in the Lancashire Breeders’ Stakes at Liverpool. He won the Molecomb Stakes at Goodwood before the end of July and was then given a break before the Rous Plate at Doncaster on 10 September. In the latter race he impressed observers with his appearance and performance in giving twelve pounds to Peacock and winning by one and a half lengths.

Galtee More was then sent to Newmarket for the year's most important two-year-old race, the six furlong Middle Park Plate in which he was matched against Lord Rosebery's undefeated colt Velasquez. The two colts had already been identified as outstanding prospects and leading contenders for the following year's Classics, and despite the presence of three other runners, the race was regarded as a virtual match, Velasquez starting the 1/5 favourite with Galtee More on 5/1. Ridden by Mornington Cannon, Galtee More led from the start and pulled clear to win easily, beating Velasquez by six lengths. The winner impressed observers with his "substance and strength", while the only excuse offered for Velasquez was that he had been unable to cope with the very soft, muddy conditions. At the end of the year, Galtee More and Velasquez were joint favourites, on 3/1 for the 1897 Derby.

=== 1897: three-year-old season ===
==== 2000 Guineas ====
Before the season began, Gubbins reportedly turned down an offer for his colt and said that £20,000 was the minimum sum he would consider. The 2000 Guineas on 5 May saw the rematch between Galtee More and Velasquez over one mile on good ground. Galtee More started 5/4 favourite for the race against seven rivals, with Velasquez on 6/4. Charles Wood tracked the leaders in the early stages as a fast pace was set by Arkle and Wreath Or. Velasquez looked to be the likely winner a quarter mile from the finish, but Galtee More accelerated past him "as if he were standing still" and drew rapidly clear to win by four lengths. After the race Gubbins turned down another offer for the colt, this time one of $125,000 from the "Montana Copper King" Marcus Daly. He followed up in the Newmarket Stakes on 19 May, in which he survived being baulked by Frisson before "sailing away" to win by two lengths. According to The Sportsman he decided the contest in two strides and won with such "incredible ease" that it could hardly be called a race.

==== Epsom Derby ====
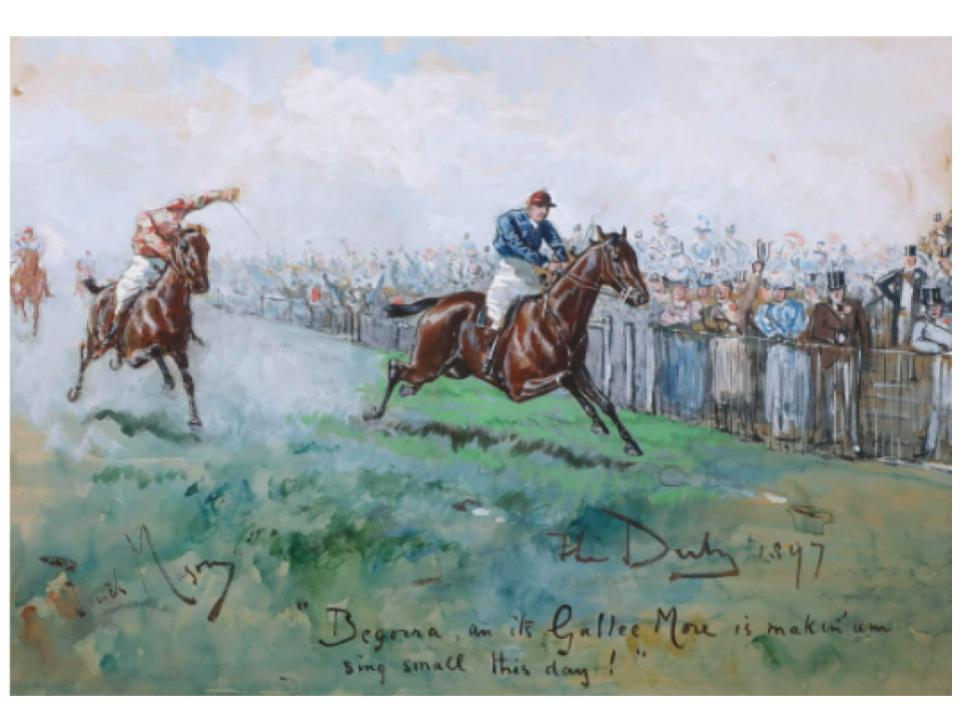
Galtee More easily wins the “Jubilee” Derby on 2nd of June 1897

The "Jubilee Derby" was run on a fine day in front of an "immense" crowd at Epsom on 2 June. Galtee More was considered virtually unbeatable and started at odds of 1/4, the second shortest in the race's history: Velasquez was 10/1 second favourite, with the other eight runners starting at 25/1 or more. Gubbins' instructions to Charles Wood were simple: "Don't be afraid of the corner, and come home as soon as you can." Wood settled the colt in the early stages as the running was made by Prime Minister and the Prince of Wales's colt Oakdene. Early in the straight Galtee More and Velasquez moved past Oakdene and from then on the race was a match between them. Wood established a clear advantage on Galtee More and, although Velasquez ran on "bravely", the favourite won "in a canter" by two lengths with History a further eight lengths away in third. After the race the winner was surrounded by enthusiastic supporters, but reacted calmly, even when one spectator began pulling out hairs from his tail as souvenirs. In Ireland, the colt's win provoked enthusiastic celebrations with bonfires being lit on the top of Galtymore mountain to mark the "humiliation of the Saxon".

Galtee More was then sent to Royal Ascot for the Prince of Wales's Stakes in which he started at odds of 1/33 and won in the "commonest of canters" from three rivals who were each receiving sixteen pounds. He then took the Sandringham Gold Cup at Sandown, winning a prize of £1,180 by beating Cortegar, the only horse to oppose him. Some disappointment was expressed around this time that there seemed little chance of a meeting between Galtee More and the outstanding four-year-old Persimmon who had easily beaten Velasquez in the Eclipse Stakes.

==== St Leger ====
Galtee More was instead sent to Doncaster to attempt to complete the Triple Crown in the St Leger on 8 September. Only four horses opposed him and Galtee More started at odds of 1/10. The early pace was slow, and Wood tracked the leaders before moving to the front on the turn into the straight. On this occasion however, he was apparently unable to pull clear of his rivals and was strongly challenged in the closing stages by the filly Chelandry, the winner of the 1000 Guineas. The winning margin was only half a length, with St Cloud and Silver Fox only a neck and a head further back, but Wood claimed that the colt was never extended. Some commentators felt that the slow early pace had led to a "false-run" race which had prevented Galtee More from producing his best form.

After the St Leger, the managers of Lingfield Park Racecourse put forward a proposal for a £3,700 weight-for-age invitation match race between Galtee More and Persimmon to take place over one mile on 2 October. The invitations were not accepted and Persimmon was retired without running again. On his final start Galtee More was sent to Newmarket for the Cambridgeshire Handicap. Entered against older horses, he was assigned a weight of 130 pounds, the highest ever given to a three-year-old, requiring him to give weight to all his rivals except the seven-year-old Clorane (136) and the five-year-old Winkfield's Pride (132). Galtee More was prepared for his Cambridgeshire challenge by running in the Sandown Park Foal Stakes. He started at odds of 8/100 and despite running in a "lazy" fashion he won with "plenty to spare" by three lengths from Cortegar and five others. Both Clorane and Winkfield's Pride were withdrawn from the Cambridgeshire, leaving Galtee More to carry top weight in a field of twenty. He started 9/2 favourite despite giving thirty-two pounds to St Cloud, who had finished a length behind him at level weights in the St Leger. He was in touch with the pace until the final quarter mile, but faded in the closing stages to finish tenth behind Comfrey, to whom he was conceding thirty-four ponds.

In October there had been widespread reports of his sale to the Hungarian government, but these proved to be inaccurate. Early the following year Gubbins sold the colt to the Russian government for £25,000 and Galtee More was exported to Russia. Negotiations had been difficult, reportedly because of the unpredictable behaviour of the Russian representative General Arapoff.

== Assessment and earnings ==
Galtee More was by far the biggest money winner of 1897. He topped the list of earners with £22,637, almost £10,000 clear of Persimmon. He had previously earned £4,382 as a two-year-old.

== Stud career ==
Galtee More proved to be a success in at stud, siring the winners of many important races in Russia, Hungary and Poland. In 1904 he was sold to the German government for £14,000 and relocated to Graditz. He continued to sire good winners at his new base, being the Leading sire in Germany in 1910. On Jan 30 he was being loaded aboard a train for a journey to the Union Stud in Hoppegarten when he slipped and trapped his hind legs. He was returned to the stud on a sledge, but a veterinary examination revealed that he had suffered an untreatable fracture to the upper part of his leg. He was euthanized the same evening at the age of twenty-three.

== Pedigree ==
Pedigree of Galtee More (IRE), bay stallion, 1894
Sire Kendal (GB) 1883	Bend Or; 1877	Doncaster	Stockwell
Sire Kendal (GB) 1883	Bend Or; 1877	Doncaster	Marigold
Sire Kendal (GB) 1883	Bend Or; 1877	Rouge Rose	Thormanby*
Sire Kendal (GB) 1883	Bend Or; 1877	Rouge Rose	Ellen Horne
Sire Kendal (GB) 1883	Windermere; 1870	Macaroni	Sweetmeat
Sire Kendal (GB) 1883	Windermere; 1870	Macaroni	Jocose
Sire Kendal (GB) 1883	Windermere; 1870	Miss Agnes	Birdcatcher
Sire Kendal (GB) 1883	Windermere; 1870	Miss Agnes	Agnes
Dam Morganette (GB) 1884	Springfield; 1873	St Albans	Stockwell
Dam Morganette (GB) 1884	Springfield; 1873	St Albans	Bribery
Dam Morganette (GB) 1884	Springfield; 1873	Viridis	Marsyas
Dam Morganette (GB) 1884	Springfield; 1873	Viridis	Maid of Palmyra
Dam Morganette (GB) 1884	Lady Morgan; 1865	Thormanby*	Windhound
Dam Morganette (GB) 1884	Lady Morgan; 1865	Thormanby*	Alice Hawthorn
Dam Morganette (GB) 1884	Lady Morgan; 1865	Morgan La Faye	Cowl
Dam Morganette (GB) 1884	Lady Morgan; 1865	Morgan La Faye	Miami (Family: 5)

* Galtee More was inbred 3 × 4 to the stallion Thormanby. This means that the 1859 Derby winner appears in both the third and fourth generations of his pedigree.
