= Wild Dayrell =

British-bred Thoroughbred racehorse

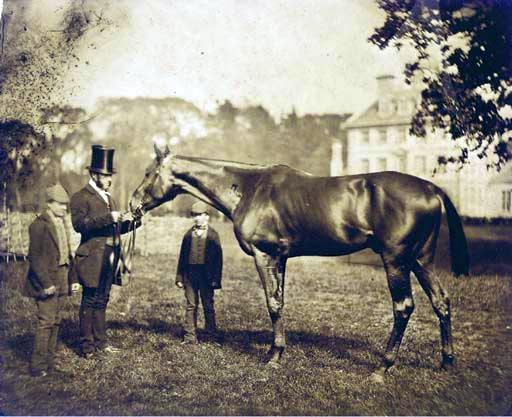
- Wild Dayrell. One of the earliest photographs of a racehorse.
- Sire: Ion
- Grandsire: Cain
- Dam: Ellen Middleton
- Damsire: Bay Middleton
- Sex: Stallion
- Foaled: 1852
- Country: United Kingdom of Great Britain and Ireland
- Colour: Brown
- Breeder: Francis Popham
- Owner: Francis Popham
- Trainer: John Rickaby
- Record: 4:3-0-0

Major wins
- Epsom Derby (1855)

Wild Dayrell (1852–1870) was a British Thoroughbred racehorse and sire. In a career that lasted from October 1854 to September 1855 he ran four times and won three races including The Derby. He was an unusual Derby winner, as neither his owner nor his trainer had any previous experience of Thoroughbred racing. Wild Dayrell was retired to stud at the end of his three-year-old season, and had some success as a stallion, siring several good winners.

== Background ==
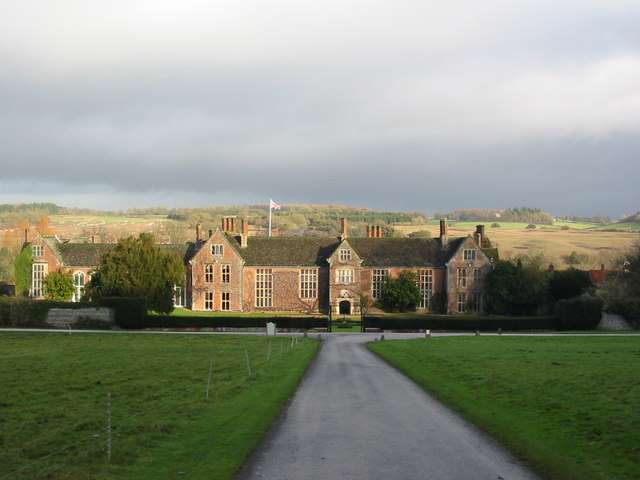
Wild Dayrell was bred at Littlecote House and returned there as a stallion

Wild Dayrell was a big, powerful brown horse standing 16.1 hands high and described as "one of the finest specimens of a racehorse" ever seen. He was bred Francis Leyborne Popham of Littlecote House, near the village of Chilton Foliat in Wiltshire although much of the credit could be given to Popham's "hunting groom", John Rickaby, who became the colt's trainer. Rickaby, acting on Popham's behalf, bought the mare Ellen Middleton for 50 guineas and arranged her mating with the stallion Ion, the Derby runner-up of 1838 and a male-line descendant of the Byerley Turk. Popham had no previous experience of breeding Thoroughbreds and Rickaby, as his job title suggests, had been mainly employed in supervising the care of his employer's hunters. During Wild Dayrell's racing career the horse was disparagingly described as being "trained by a gardner".

Wild Dayrell was foaled in April 1852. Shortly after his birth he was moved to a warmer stable in a wheel-barrow by Popham's butler, who reportedly claimed that he was "wheeling the winner of the Derby". The colt was named after a local legend about one of Popham's ancestors, who had murdered an illegitimate baby by throwing it on a fire and whose ghost was alleged to haunt Littlecote.

Popham initially decided not to keep the colt for racing and offered him for sale as a yearling. He was bought by the trainer John Kent on behalf of Lord Henry Lennox, the son of the Duke of Richmond and entered training with Kent at Goodwood. The sale price was 100 guineas, with an extra 500 guineas to be paid if the colt won the Derby.

== Racing career ==
=== 1854: two-year-old season ===
Wild Dayrell was very backward and immature in the early part of his two-year-old season, and showed very little ability in his training gallops at Goodwood. The colt was therefore put up for sale again and was bought back by Popham for 250 guineas and returned to Littlecote, where Rickaby took over his training. Popham then sold a share in Wild Dayrell to Lord Craven and the colt's training base was moved to Craven's estate at Ashdown Park. As his owners had no other racehorses, Rickaby trained Wild Dayrell at Ashdown by galloping him against various hacks and hunters.

In autumn, it was decided that Wild Dayrell was ready for a racecourse test and he was sent to Newmarket for the "First October" meeting. On 27 September he ran in a three-horse Sweepstakes and won very easily, beating Para and Hazel by two lengths and impressing observers to the extent that he became regarded as a contender for the following year's Derby.

=== 1855: three-year-old season ===
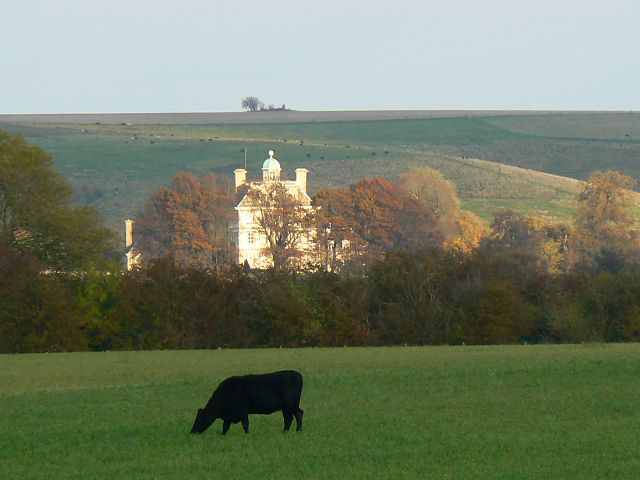
Wild Dayrell was trained at Ashdown, Oxfordshire

Early in 1855, Popham and Craven reportedly turned down an offer of £3,000 for Wild Dayrell from Baron Meyer de Rothschild. In the spring, his owners decided that Wild Dayrell needed more challenging tests in training and bought a succession of increasingly able thoroughbreds against which to gallop him. The process culminated in a trial race ten days before the Derby in which Wild Dayrell, ridden by the professional jockey Robert Sherwood, conceded twenty-one pounds to three rivals including a top class colt named Jack Shepherd and won easily. Reports of the supposedly private trial became public and Wild Dayrell's status as a leading Derby contender was confirmed.

Wild Dayrell's position at the head of the Derby betting made him the target of unscrupulous gamblers and bookmakers who stood to lose money if he won at Epsom and Popham responded by sacking a member of staff who had been behaving suspiciously and putting the horse under twenty-four-hour guard. The plots continued: the horse-box which was hired to take the colt to Epsom was sabotaged, and collapsed when Popham had it tested it with a bullock. Finally a bribe of £5,000 was offered to Wild Dayrell's owners to withdraw him from the race. Popham rejected the bribe and the horse was sent to Epsom.

At Epsom on 27 May Wild Dayrell started the even money favourite against eleven rivals, with his main rival expected to be the 2000 Guineas winner Lord of the Isles who started second favourite at 7/4. The weather was fine but the mood of the crowd was less festive than usual, a fact possibly explained by progress of the Crimean War. Ridden by Sherwood, he tracked the leader Kingstown before making his challenge just over a furlong from the finish. He moved quickly into the lead and won easily by a length from Kingstown, with Lord of the Isles finishing third. A great deal of money was won on the race, with Lord Craven taking £10,000 in winning bets. The jockey Jack Charlton, who had ridden Jack Shepherd in the "private" trial was also reported to be among the winners, clearing £1,000 The ground at Epsom was unusually firm and Wild Dayrell returned from the race lame in his left foreleg.

Wild Dayrell's lameness caused him to be withdrawn from his planned run in the Goodwood Cup. He next appeared at York in August where he won the "Ebor St Leger" in impressive style from a highly valued colt named Oulston. Wild Dayrell had not been entered in the St Leger at Doncaster Racecourse and was instead aimed at the Doncaster Cup over two and a half miles. He started odds-on favourite for the race despite carrying a seven-pound weight penalty for winning the Derby and appearing for the race with his legs heavily bandaged. As feared, his leg problems resurfaced in the race and he was pulled up lame, failing to finish the course behind Rataplan. It proved to be his first and only defeat as he was retired to stud shortly afterwards.

== Assessment and honours ==
Wild Dayrell was a difficult horse to assess, as he was never extended in any of his victories and was injured in his only defeat: one writer, reporting on his death commented that, "there is no saying how good as a racehorse he really was". R. H. Copperthwaite, in his book "The Turf and the Racehorse", offered the opinion that Wild Dayrell won the Derby with at least twenty pounds in hand.

Wild Dayrell's name seems to have been popular with owners of boats and ships. A Confederate blockade runner named the "Wild Dayrell" was destroyed by Admiral Samuel Phillips Lee off Wilmington, North Carolina in 1864 and at least two other registered vessels bore the name, one of them a famous Opium clipper.

== Stud career ==
Wild Dayrell stood as a stallion at Littlecote at an initial fee of 30 guineas. He became a reasonably successful sire, getting many winners and two particularly notable horses. His daughter Hurricane won the 1000 Guineas in 1862, and later foaled the 1874 2000 Guineas winner Atlantic. His best son was Buccaneer, a good racehorse who became an excellent stallion. Buccaneer was British Champion sire in 1868 and 1869 where his offspring included the multiple Classic winner Formosa. He was later exported to Hungary, where he sired the Derby winner Kisber. Wild Dayrell died in his stall at Littlecote in November 1879.

== Sire line tree ==
- Wild Dayrell
  - Buccaneer
    - Captain Kidd
    - Pirate Chief
    - Michael-De-Basco
    - Paul Jones
      - Paul's Cray
      - Gunboat
    - See Saw
      - Cradle
      - Discord
      - Cylinder
      - Master Waller
      - Bruce
        - Sledge
        - Chapeau Chinois
      - Despair
        - Bentworth
        - Comfrey
      - Sortie
      - Acrostic
      - Little Duck
        - Perdican
        - Arelequin
        - Champaubert
        - Canvas Back
        - Gosbeck
        - Canard
      - Castanet
      - Dog Rose
      - Loved One
        - Dinna Forget
      - Ocean Wave
      - Upset
      - Dazzle
    - Black Flag
    - Lopez
    - Ventnor
    - Brigand
    - Cadet
    - Flibustier
      - Tschungatai
      - Trachenberg
        - Hannibal
      - Architekt
      - Fledermaus
      - Freimaurer
    - Falscapa
    - Gamecock
    - Young Buccaneer
    - Waisenknabe
      - Lehetetian
      - Stronzian
        - Aspirant
    - Kisber
      - Kinsky
      - Crafton
        - Freak
        - Craftsman
        - Hulcot
      - Ducat
      - Harmattan
      - Hungarian
      - Arcadian
        - Flugschrift
      - Kaunitz
      - Sennor
      - Hardenberg
      - Realist
        - Real Scotch
      - Ausmarker
      - Sperber
      - Asche
      - Trollhetta
      - Undolf
      - Steinbock
      - Altgold
      - Sperber's Bruder
      - Imm
    - Bibor
    - Good Hope
      - Good Boy
      - Tambour-Major
    - Good Morning
    - Vordermann
    - Pirat
    - Tallos
    - Kisber-Ocscse
      - Inaska
    - Nil Desperandum
    - Picklock
    - Elemer
    - Florian
    - Balvany
      - Kozma
    - Landlord
    - Vederemo
    - Grand Buccaneer
    - Vinea
    - Fenek
    - Talpra Magyar
      - Tokio
        - Mokan
      - Xamete
  - Horror
  - Dusk
  - Investment
  - Gladstone
  - Sea King
  - Robin Hood
  - Harllington
  - The Rake
    - Scamp
    - Constantine
    - Roscius
    - Pepper and Salt
      - Grey Leg
        - Bass Rock
        - Grey Plume
        - Quelpart
        - Senseless
      - Cayenne
  - Wild Moor
  - Talk O' The Hill
    - Hero
    - Rapid Bay
    - Aldinga
    - Neckersgat
      - Dunlop
      - Portsea
      - Tarquin
    - Pride of the Hills
    - Don Carlos
  - Tregeagle
    - Imprudence
    - Tubal Cain
      - Coriolanus
      - Emir Bey
      - Precious Stone
        - Carbonate
        - Lapstone
      - Two of Hearts
        - Wandering Willie
    - Ironmaster
    - Quintin Matsys
    - Turquoise
    - Metal
  - Wild Blood
  - Allbrook
  - Wild Oats
    - Wild Monarch
    - Juventus
    - Gozo
      - Gaulus
      - The Grafter
  - Guy Dayrell
  - Montargis

== Pedigree ==
Pedigree of Wild Dayrell (GB), brown stallion, 1852
Sire Ion (GB) 1835	Cain; 1822	Paulowitz	Sir Paul
Sire Ion (GB) 1835	Cain; 1822	Paulowitz	Evelina
Sire Ion (GB) 1835	Cain; 1822	Paynator mare	Paynator
Sire Ion (GB) 1835	Cain; 1822	Paynator mare	Delpini mare
Sire Ion (GB) 1835	Margaret; 1831	Edmund	Orville
Sire Ion (GB) 1835	Margaret; 1831	Edmund	Emmeline
Sire Ion (GB) 1835	Margaret; 1831	Medora	Selim*
Sire Ion (GB) 1835	Margaret; 1831	Medora	Sir Harry mare
Dam Ellen Middleton (GB) 1846	Bay Middleton; 1833	Sultan	Selim*
Dam Ellen Middleton (GB) 1846	Bay Middleton; 1833	Sultan	Bacchante
Dam Ellen Middleton (GB) 1846	Bay Middleton; 1833	Cobweb	Phantom
Dam Ellen Middleton (GB) 1846	Bay Middleton; 1833	Cobweb	Filagree
Dam Ellen Middleton (GB) 1846	Myrrha; 1831	Maleck Adel	Blacklock
Dam Ellen Middleton (GB) 1846	Myrrha; 1831	Maleck Adel	Juniper mare
Dam Ellen Middleton (GB) 1846	Myrrha; 1831	Bessy	Young Gouty
Dam Ellen Middleton (GB) 1846	Myrrha; 1831	Bessy	Grandiflora (Family:7)

* Wild Dayrell is inbred 4S x 4D to the stallion Selim, meaning that he appears fourth generation on the sire side of his pedigree and fourth generation on the dam side of his pedigree.
