= Leading broodmare sire in Japan =

The list below shows the leading sire of broodmares in Japan for each year since 1974. This is determined by the amount of prize money won in a race held by the JRA during the year in Japan by racehorses that were foaled by a daughter of the sire in question.

- 1974 – Hindostan (1)
- 1975 – Hindostan (2)
- 1976 – Hindostan (3)
- 1977 – Tosa Midori (1)
- 1978 – Hindostan (4)
- 1979 – China Rock (1)
- 1980 – China Rock (2)
- 1981 – China Rock (3)
- 1982 – China Rock (4)
- 1983 – China Rock (5)
- 1984 – Never Beat (1)
- 1985 – China Rock (6)
- 1986 – Never Beat (2)
- 1987 – Partholon (1)
- 1988 – Never Beat (3)
- 1989 – Partholon (2)
- 1990 – Northern Taste (1) (Faberge if NAR earnings are included)
- 1991 – Northern Taste (2)
- 1992 – Northern Taste (3)
- 1993 – Northern Taste (4)
- 1994 – Northern Taste (5)
- 1995 – Northern Taste (6)
- 1996 – Northern Taste (7)
- 1997 – Northern Taste (8)
- 1998 – Northern Taste (9)
- 1999 – Northern Taste (10)
- 2000 – Northern Taste (11)
- 2001 – Northern Taste (12)
- 2002 – Northern Taste (13)
- 2003 – Northern Taste (14)
- 2004 – Northern Taste (15)
- 2005 – Northern Taste (16)
- 2006 – Northern Taste (17)
- 2007 – Sunday Silence (1)
- 2008 – Sunday Silence (2)
- 2009 – Sunday Silence (3)
- 2010 – Sunday Silence (4)
- 2011 – Sunday Silence (5)
- 2012 – Sunday Silence (6)
- 2013 – Sunday Silence (7)
- 2014 – Sunday Silence (8)
- 2015 – Sunday Silence (9)
- 2016 – Sunday Silence (10)
- 2017 – Sunday Silence (11)
- 2018 – Sunday Silence (12)
- 2019 – Sunday Silence (13)
- 2020 – King Kamehameha (1)
- 2021 – King Kamehameha (2)
- 2022 – King Kamehameha (3)
- 2023 – Deep Impact (1)
- 2024 – Deep Impact (2)
- 2025 – Deep Impact (3)

== See also ==
- Leading sire in Australia
- Leading sire in France
- Leading sire in Germany
- Leading sire in Great Britain & Ireland
- Leading sire in Japan
- Leading sire in North America
- Leading broodmare sire in North America
