= Leading sire in Germany =

The list below shows the leading Thoroughbred sire of racehorses in Germany for each year since 1867. This is determined by the amount of prize money won by the sire's progeny during the season. The 2016 novel Mount! by Jilly Cooper describes the process to gain the fictional title for global leading sire.

- 1867 - St. Giles (1)
- 1868 - Lord Fauconberg (1)
- 1869 - Ignoramus (1)
- 1870 - King of Diamonds (1)
- 1871 - Grimston (1)
- 1872 - Lord Clifden (1)
- 1873 - Savernake (1)
- 1874 - Savernake (2)
- 1875 - Buccaneer (1)
- 1876 - Buccaneer (2)
- 1877 - Cambuscan (1)
- 1878 - Buccaneer (3)
- 1879 - Savernake (3)
- 1880 - Buccaneer (4)
- 1881 - Savernake (4)
- 1882 - The Palmer (1)
- 1883 - The Palmer (2)
- 1884 - Flibustier (1)
- 1885 - Chamant (1)
- 1886 - Chamant (2)
- 1887 - Chamant (3)
- 1888 - Flibustier (2)
- 1889 - Flibustier (3)
- 1890 - Chamant (4)
- 1891 - Chamant (5)
- 1892 - Chamant (6)
- 1893 - Trachenberg (1)
- 1894 - Kisber (1)
- 1895 - Kisber (2)
- 1896 - Kisber (3)
- 1897 - Chamant (7)
- 1898 - Fulmen (1)
- 1899 - Fulmen (2)
- 1900 - Fulmen (3)
- 1901 - Gouverneur (1)
- 1902 - Saraband (1)
- 1903 - Saraband (2)
- 1904 - Saphir (1)
- 1905 - Saphir (2)
- 1906 - Hannibal (1)
- 1907 - Saphir (3)
- 1908 - Calveley (1)
- 1909 - Ard Patrick (1)
- 1910 - Galtee More (1)
- 1911 - Ard Patrick (2)
- 1912 - Hannibal (2)
- 1913 - Ard Patrick (3)
- 1914 - Ard Patrick (4)
- 1915 - Nuage (1)
- 1916 - Nuage (2)
- 1917 - Nuage (3)
- 1918 - Dark Ronald (1)
- 1919 - Dark Ronald (2)
- 1920 - Dark Ronald (3)
- 1921 - Dark Ronald (4)
- 1922 - Dark Ronald (5)
- 1923 - Fervor (1)
- 1924 - Fervor (2)
- 1925 - Fervor (3)
- 1926 - Fervor (4)
- 1927 - Prunus (1)
- 1928 - Prunus (2)
- 1929 - Prunus (3)
- 1930 - Wallenstein (1)
- 1931 - Herold (1)
- 1932 - Prunus (4)
- 1933 - Herold (2)
- 1934 - Prunus (5)
- 1935 - Oleander (1)
- 1936 - Flamboyant (1)
- 1937 - Oleander (2)
- 1938 - Oleander (3)
- 1939 - Oleander (4)
- 1940 - Oleander (5)
- 1941 - Oleander (6)
- 1942 - Oleander (7)
- 1943 - Oleander (8)
- 1944 - Oleander (9)
- 1945 - Aventin (1)
- 1946 - Alchimist (1)
- 1947 - Alchimist (2)
- 1948 - Wahnfried (1)
- 1949 - Arjaman (1)
- 1950 - Ticino (1)
- 1951 - Ticino (2)
- 1952 - Ticino (3)
- 1953 - Ticino (4)
- 1954 - Ticino (5)
- 1955 - Ticino (6)
- 1956 - Ticino (7)
- 1957 - Ticino (8)
- 1958 - Ticino (9)
- 1959 - Neckar (1)
- 1960 - Neckar (2)
- 1961 - Mangon (1)
- 1962 - Neckar (3)
- 1963 - Neckar (4)
- 1964 - Neckar (5)
- 1965 - Neckar (6)
- 1966 - Orsini (1)
- 1967 - Birkhahn (1)
- 1968 - Birkhahn (2)
- 1969 - Orsini (2)
- 1970 - Birkhahn (3)
- 1971 - Orsini (3)
- 1972 - Kronzeuge (1)
- 1973 - Kaiseradler (1)
- 1974 - Orsini (4)
- 1975 - Appiani II (1)
- 1976 - Kaiseradler (1)
- 1977 - Kaiseradler (2)
- 1978 - Alpenkönig (1)
- 1979 - Dschingis Khan (1)
- 1980 - Alpenkönig (2)
- 1981 - Dschingis Khan (2)
- 1982 - Priamos (1)
- 1983 - Frontal (1)
- 1984 - Frontal (2)
- 1985 - Surumu (1)
- 1986 - Surumu (2)
- 1987 - Nebos (1)
- 1988 - Königsstuhl (1)
- 1989 - Surumu (3)
- 1990 - Surumu (4)
- 1991 - Surumu (5)
- 1992 - Surumu (6)
- 1993 - Acatenango (1)
- 1994 - Königsstuhl (1)
- 1995 - Acatenango (2)
- 1996 - Königsstuhl (2)
- 1997 - Acatenango (3)
- 1998 - Dashing Blade (1)
- 1999 - Acatenango (4)
- 2000 - Monsun (1)
- 2001 - Acatenango (5)
- 2002 - Monsun (2)
- 2003 - Big Shuffle (1)
- 2004 - Monsun (3)
- 2005 - Big Shuffle (2)
- 2006 - Monsun (4)
- 2007 - Big Shuffle (3)
- 2008 - Samum (1)
- 2009 - Big Shuffle (4)
- 2010 - Areion (1)
- 2011 - Big Shuffle (5)
- 2012 - Big Shuffle (6)
- 2013 - Areion (2)
- 2014 - Tertullian (1)
- 2015 - Areion (3)
- 2016 - Soldier Hollow (1)
- 2017 - Areion (4)
- 2018 - Soldier Hollow (2)
- 2019 - Soldier Hollow (3)
- 2020 - Adlerflug (1)
- 2021 - Adlerflug (2)
- 2022 - Adlerflug (3)
- 2023 - Sea The Moon
- 2024 - Sea The Moon
- 2025 - Soldier Hollow (4)

== See also ==
- Leading sire in Australia
- Leading sire in France
- Leading sire in Great Britain & Ireland
- Leading sire in Japan
- Leading broodmare sire in Japan
- Leading sire in North America
- Leading broodmare sire in Great Britain & Ireland
- Leading broodmare sire in North America
