= Rock Sand =

British-bred Thoroughbred racehorse

- Sire: Sainfoin
- Grandsire: Springfield
- Dam: Roquebrune
- Damsire: St. Simon
- Sex: Stallion
- Foaled: 1900
- Died: 1914 (aged 13–14)
- Country: United Kingdom of Great Britain and Ireland
- Colour: Brown
- Breeder: Sir James Miller
- Owner: Sir James Miller; August Belmont Jr. (at stud)
- Trainer: George Blackwell
- Record: 20: 16-1-3
- Earnings: £47,913

Major wins
- Woodcote Stakes (1902); Coventry Stakes (1902); Champagne Stakes (1902); Dewhurst Stakes (1902); 2,000 Guineas (1903); Epsom Derby (1903); St. Leger Stakes (1903); St. James's Palace Stakes (1903); Hardwicke Stakes (1904); Princess of Wales's Stakes (1904); Jockey Club Stakes (1904)

Awards
- 10th UK Triple Crown Champion (1903)
- Last updated on 28 September 2006

Rock Sand (1900–1914) was a British Thoroughbred race horse and sire. In a career which lasted from the spring of 1902 until October 1904 he ran twenty times and won sixteen races. He was a leading British two-year-old of his generation and the winner of the British Triple Crown, having won the 2,000 Guineas Stakes, The Derby, and the St. Leger Stakes. He won another series of major races as a four-year-old before being retired to stud, where he had success in both Europe and North America.

== Background ==
Rock Sand was a small brown horse bred by his owner Sir James Miller at his Hamilton Stud in Newmarket. Rock Sand was sired by Sainfoin, the winner of the 1890 Derby, who was bred by Queen Victoria. He was the first foal of Roquebrune by St. Simon who won two races and was a half-sister to Epsom Oaks winner Seabreeze. Rock Sand was trained throughout his career by George Blackwell at Newmarket, Suffolk.

Rock Sand was a notably bad mover in his slower paces: those unfamiliar with his gait frequently assumed that he was lame when he trotted or cantered to the start before his races. He was also criticised early in his career by some observers who felt that he was too small to be a Derby winner.

== Racing career ==
=== 1902: two-year-old season ===
As a two-year-old, Rock Sand began his racing career by winning the Bedford Stakes at the Newmarket Spring meeting. He then won the Woodcote Stakes at Epsom, the Coventry Stakes at Royal Ascot, the Chesterfield Stakes at Newmarket on 17 July and the Champagne Stakes at Doncaster in September, ridden on each occasion by the American Danny Maher. By the end of summer he was being described as the best two-year-old of the season. At Newmarket on October he suffered his first defeat when beaten as the even money favourite for the Middle Park Stakes. The race was won by his stable companion Flotsam (ridden by Maher) with Greatorex second and Rock Sand, ridden on this occasion by William Lane third. Two weeks later Rock Sand defeated the King's colt Mead by three lengths to win the Dewhurst Stakes with Greatorex third. As the horses went into the winter break, Rock Sand was 4/1 favourite for the following year's Derby, with Flotsam the second choice.

=== 1903: three-year-old season ===
On his first race as a three-year-old Rock Sand won the Bennington Stakes, a minor race at Newmarket's Craven meeting. In the 2000 Guineas on 29 April he started 6/4 favourite in a field of eleven runners, with Sermon on 6/1 and Flotsam on 7/1. Ridden by the American jockey Skeets Martin he tracked Flotsam in the early stages before moving into the lead just after half way and winning easily by one and a half lengths from Flotsam, with Rabelais third. The Sportsman magazine noted that Rock Sand was a rather lazy colt who "does not gallop until he is compelled to".

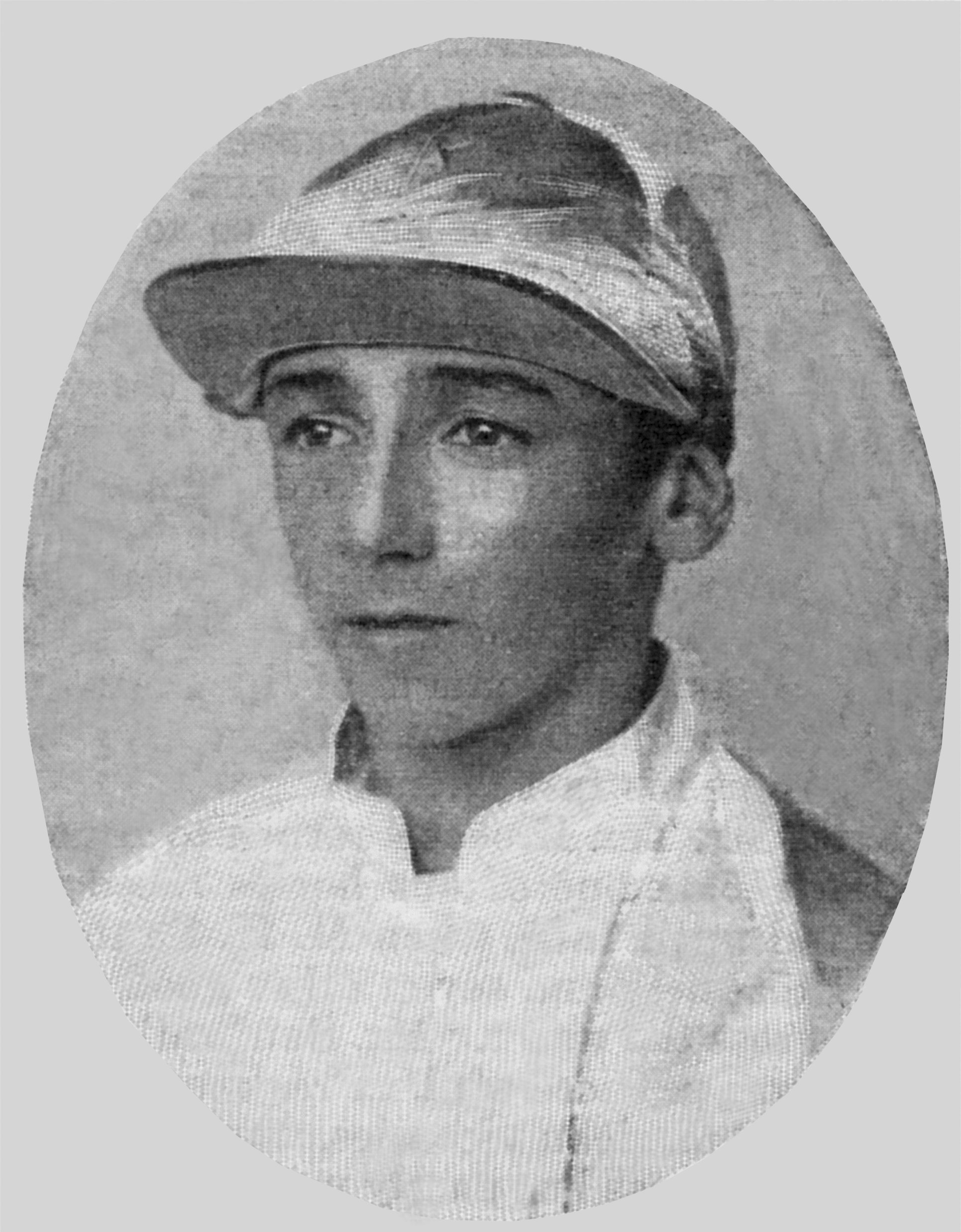
Danny Maher ca. 1900.

The Derby at Epsom attracted a field of seven runners, the smallest of the twentieth century. Rock Sand was ridden by Danny Maher (right) and started favourite at 4/6 in front of a crowd which included the King and Queen and the Prince and Princess of Wales. Rock Sand started quickly and took an early advantage before the Royal colt Mead took over and led until just before the turn into the straight, where Maher moved Rock Sand back into the lead. The French-trained second favourite Vinicius came from well back in the field to emerge as the main challenger in the last quarter-mile but could never catch Rock Sand who won by two lengths, with Flotsam two lengths further back in third. It was the first of three Derby winners for Maher and the third successive win for an American jockey following the wins of Lester Reiff in 1901 and Skeets Martin in 1902.

Rock Sand followed up his Derby win with a run at Royal Ascot where he took the St. James's Palace Stakes over one mile from three "moderate" opponents at odds of 1/10. He then faced older horses for the first time when he was sent to Sandown for the Eclipse Stakes. The 1903 running of the Eclipse Stakes on 17 July was one of the notable races of the early 20th century when Rock Sand faced the previous year's Derby winner Ard Patrick and the filly, Sceptre who had won the other four British Classic Races in 1902. The race thus brought together "the three best horses in England", and perhaps "the most valuable field of horses that ever started in a race in any part of the world". The King was among the immense crowd which was drawn to Sandown for the "Battle of Giants". The odds at the start were 5/4 Rock Sand, 7/4 Sceptre and 5/1 Ard Patrick. Rock Sand disputed the lead with Oriole in the early stages but was challenged and overtaken by Ard Patrick before the turn into the straight. He faded in the closing stages and finished third, beaten a neck and three lengths by Ard Patrick and Sceptre who fought out a "desperate finish". The contest was favourably compared to the race for the 1887 Hardwicke Stakes between Ormonde, Minting and Bendigo.

On 9 September at Doncaster, Rock Sand attempted to complete the Triple Crown in the St Leger. Only four horses opposed him and he was sent off the 2/5 favourite. He reportedly had thing "all his own way" and won easily by four lengths from William Rufus, with Mead in third. Rock Sand's final start of the season came in the £10,000 Jockey Club Stakes over one and three quarter miles at Newmarket on 1 October. Ard Patrick had been retired by this time but Rock Sand was opposed by Sceptre. Rock Sand was beaten four lengths by the filly, who was conceding eighteen pounds– nine pounds more than weight-for-age– and won with "consummate ease".

Rock Sand's earnings of £22,633 in 1903 enabled his sire Sainfoin to his best position of second on the list of leading sires.

=== 1904: four-year-old season ===
On his four-year-old debut, Rock Sand ran against Sceptre again in June over the Derby course and distance in the Coronation Cup, a race which also featured the first meeting between Rock Sand and his contemporary Zinfandel, a colt whose engagements in the previous year's classics had been rendered void by the death of his owner Colonel Harry McCalmont. Zinfandel won easily from Sceptre, with Rock Sand third.

Rock Sand avoided Zinfandel for the remainder of the season and was unbeaten in his remaining five races. He won the Hardwicke Stakes at Royal Ascot, beating Sceptre for the first time. He was then an easy, odds-on winner of the £10,000 Princess of Wales's Stakes at Newmarket on 30 June from Saltpetre (who won the Goodwood Cup on his next start) and William Rufus. Sceptre was not allowed to run in the race as her former owner, R. S. "Bob" Sievier had been "warned off" (banned from any involvement in racing). It was reported that Lillie Langtry, the former mistress of King Edward VII, eased her financial difficulties by winning £100 on the race. A few days later Rock Sand added the Lingfield Park Stakes, beating Loch Ryan and Henry the First. and later in July he won the Newmarket First Foal Stakes. Rock Sand ended his racing career in the £10,000 Jockey Club Stakes on 29 September in which he defeated Henry the First and William Rufus, with the Derby winner St. Amant unplaced. Before the race his action looked even worse than usual as he hobbled to the start "like a cripple", but won impressively and was given an enthusiastic reception by the Newmarket crowd which greeted the joint-favourite's success with "deafening cheers".

Rock Sand's winning prize money of £19,719 made him the highest earner of the British season ahead of the filly Pretty Polly. He was kept in training until the spring of 1905 with the aim of running in the Ascot Gold Cup, but persistent tendon trouble forced his retirement.

== Assessment ==
Despite winning more top class races than most Derby winners, Rock Sand was never rated very highly, although it was acknowledged that he was "unmistakably... a high-class racehorse". His success in the Triple Crown was seen as arising from the generally poor quality of his rivals and the enforced absence of Zinfandel an impression reinforced by his defeat by Zinfandel in 1904. In their book A Century of Champions, John Randall and Tony Morris rated Rock Sand an "average" Derby winner.

== Stud record ==
Rock Sand retired to stud in England, but when James Miller died in 1906 he was put up for sale. He was bought for £25,000 for breeding purposes by the American, August Belmont Jr., who sent him to his Nursery Stud near Lexington, Kentucky. His arrival in the United States was not trouble-free as it took more than an hour before he could be persuaded to walk down the gangplank from the ship which had brought him to America. In Kentucky, he sired:

- Damrosch, winner of the 1916 Preakness Stakes
- Friar Rock (won the 1916 Belmont Stakes)
- Gunrock, a stallion of the United States Army Remount Service that was chosen in the 1920s to be the mascot of what is now known as the University of California, Davis
- High Rock (won WATC All-Aged Stakes and WATC Grandstand Plate)
- Mahubah, the dam of Man o' War
- Malachite, an ancestor of the show jumping gelding Gem Twist
- Qu'Elle Est Belle II (Prix de Diane)
- Rock View (USA Withers Stakes)
- Spun Glass, dam of Broomspun (Preakness Stakes) winner
- Sun Queen, dam of Coventry (Preakness Stakes) winner
- Tracery, who won St. Leger Stakes etc.; sire of a number of British champions, including 1923 Derby winner Papyrus

The Hart–Agnew anti-betting legislation implemented by the Republican controlled New York Legislature under Governor Charles Evans Hughes eventually led to the complete shutdown of horse racing in New York state and forced Belmont to sell Rock Sand to a syndicate who shipped him to a stud farm France in 1912. He became a difficult horse to manage, eating his bedding straw and kicking the walls of his stable. He died of heart disease on 20 July 1914. His skeleton can be seen in the Gallery of Comparative Anatomy & Paleontology at the Muséum national d'histoire naturelle in Paris, France.

== Pedigree ==
Pedigree of Rock Sand (GB), brown stallion, 1900
| Sire Sainfoin 1887 | Springfield; 1873 | St.Albans | Stockwell |
| Sire Sainfoin 1887 | Springfield; 1873 | St.Albans | Bribery |
| Sire Sainfoin 1887 | Springfield; 1873 | Viridis | Marsyas |
| Sire Sainfoin 1887 | Springfield; 1873 | Viridis | Maid of Palmyra |
| Sire Sainfoin 1887 | Sanda; 1878 | Wenlock | Lord Clifden |
| Sire Sainfoin 1887 | Sanda; 1878 | Wenlock | Mineral |
| Sire Sainfoin 1887 | Sanda; 1878 | Sandal | Stockwell |
| Sire Sainfoin 1887 | Sanda; 1878 | Sandal | Lady Evelyn |
| Dam Roquebrune 1893 | St. Simon; 1881 | Galopin | Vedette |
| Dam Roquebrune 1893 | St. Simon; 1881 | Galopin | Flying Duchess |
| Dam Roquebrune 1893 | St. Simon; 1881 | St.Angela | King Tom |
| Dam Roquebrune 1893 | St. Simon; 1881 | St.Angela | Adeline |
| Dam Roquebrune 1893 | St.Marguerite; 1879 | Hermit | Newminster |
| Dam Roquebrune 1893 | St.Marguerite; 1879 | Hermit | Seclusion |
| Dam Roquebrune 1893 | St.Marguerite; 1879 | Devotion | Stockwell |
| Dam Roquebrune 1893 | St.Marguerite; 1879 | Devotion | Alcestis (Family: 4-n) |

- Rock Sand was inbred 4 × 4 × 4 to Stockwell, meaning that this stallion appears three times in the fourth generation of his pedigree.

== See also ==
- List of racehorses
