= Blair Athol (horse) =

British Thoroughbred racehorse

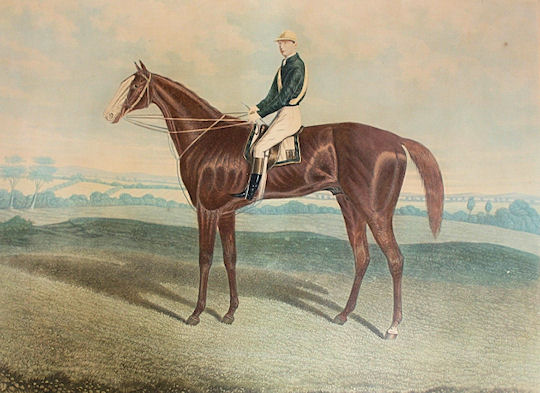
- Blair Athol, engraving by Charles Hunt & Son
- Sire: Stockwell
- Dam: Blink Bonny
- Sex: Stallion
- Foaled: 1861
- Country: United Kingdom of Great Britain and Ireland
- Colour: Chestnut
- Breeder: William I'Anson
- Owner: William I'Anson
- Trainer: William I'Anson
- Record: 7: 5-2-0

Major wins
- Epsom Derby (1864); Triennial Stakes (1864); St Leger (1864)

Awards
- Leading sire in Great Britain and Ireland (1872, 1873, 1875, 1877)

Blair Athol (1861–1882) was a British Thoroughbred racehorse and sire. In a career that lasted little more than three months in the summer and autumn of 1864, he ran seven times and won five races including one walk-over. His wins included The Derby and the St Leger. Despite the brevity of his racing career, he was regarded by contemporary experts as one of the best British racehorses of his era and arguably the greatest horse ever trained in the North of England. He went on to become a highly successful stallion, siring the winners of many races.

== Background ==
Blair Athol was a flaxen chestnut with a broad white blaze. He was bred, owned and trained by William I'Anson, who was based in Malton, North Yorkshire. His sire, Stockwell, was the leading British colt of his generation, winning the 2000 Guineas and the St Leger in 1852. He went on to become the dominant sire of his era, winning the title of Champion sire on seven occasions. Blair Athol's dam was the outstanding racemare Blink Bonny, who won the Derby in 1857.

== Racing career ==
Blair Athol was slow to mature and did not race as a two-year-old. He did, however, show significant promise in trial gallops, and I’Anson turned down an offer of £7,000 for the colt from the bookmaker John Jackson. The fact that he had been entered in nine races without actually running caused some scepticism, but he was recognised by many observers as a horse of exceptional potential and a serious "dark horse" contender for the Derby.

In the spring of 1864, Blair Athol had training difficulties and missed an intended run in the Dee Stakes at Chester. He suffered from dental problems which sometimes prevented him from feeding. He was also the victim of repeated attacks by a stable lad who had been paid by bookmakers to prevent the horse from running in the Derby. Before the culprit was caught, he had repeatedly kicked the colt on his legs and genitals, causing intermittent lameness.

Blair Athol made his racecourse debut in the 1864 Derby on 25 May. He started at odds of 14/1 against twenty-nine opponents, in a strong field led by the 2000 Guineas winner General Peel who started joint-favourite on 9/2 with Scottish Chief. The race was run in fine, sunny weather and attracted an immense crowd including the Prince of Wales. The colt was ridden by James Snowden, a highly talented but troubled Yorkshireman who struggled with alcoholism. The race was delayed by eight false starts, and when the runners eventually got under way, Blair Athol broke slowly and was towards the back of the field in the early stages. Snowden rode a patient race, steadily making ground and moving up to track the leaders on the final turn. General Peel went to the front and appeared the likely winner until Snowden produced Blair Athol with a challenge. A furlong from the finish, Blair Athol moved level with the leader and then drew away with "ridiculous ease" to win by two lengths from General Peel with Scottish Chief third. The first prize was £6,675 and the winning time was a record 2:43.6

Immediately after his Derby win, Blair Athol was sent to France for the second running of the Grand Prix de Paris at Longchamp. The 3000m event was the most valuable prize in world racing, and attracted a large crowd including the French Emperor and Empress. Blair Athol's journey was delayed by bad weather at Folkestone and he arrived at the course only the night before the race. He started favourite ahead of Fille de l'Air, a French filly whose hostile reception after winning The Oaks had led to an intensification of the nationalistic rivalry surrounding the event. Ridden on this occasion by Tom Chaloner, Blair Athol was held up in last place before moving up to contest the lead in the straight. He was unable, however, to overhaul the long-time leader Vermout and finished second, beaten two lengths. The defeat of the English champion provoked scenes of wild excitement and celebration amongst the French crowd.

On his return to England, Blair Athol was sent to Royal Ascot where he won the Triennial Stakes over one mile. In July, he won the Gratwicke Stakes at Goodwood and walked over in the Zetland Plate when no other runners opposed him. In August, he was beaten in the Great Yorkshire Stakes at York by a colt named The Miner. Blair Athol had the race apparently won in the closing stages but was caught close home and beaten a length in what was considered a huge upset.

At Doncaster on 14 September, Blair Athol started 2/1 favourite for the St Leger in a field of ten, being slightly favoured over General Peel, who was believed to be in much better form than at Epsom. The race was run in heavy rain and "fearful" conditions, but attracted a huge crowd of supporters hoping to see the Yorkshire-trained Blair Athol win the great Yorkshire race. The visiting dignitaries on this occasion included the King of Italy. Ridden again by Snowden, Blair Athol was held up as usual before making his challenge in the straight. Inside the final furlong he was switched to the outside and came "shooting past" the other runners and won very easily by two lengths from General Peel. As Blair Athol was making his decisive run he was struck by another horse and sustained a tendon injury. He returned from the race lame and never raced again.

When Blair Athol was moved from Malton to take up stud duties at Fairfield, near York, the road was lined by cheering supporters.

== Assessment ==
In May 1886 The Sporting Times carried out a poll of one hundred racing experts to create a ranking of the best British racehorses of the 19th century. Blair Athol was ranked fifth, having been placed in the top ten by fifty-two of the contributors. He was the second highest-placed horse of the 1860s behind Gladiateur.

The bloodstock expert William Allison described him as "the best horse I have ever seen."

== Stud career ==
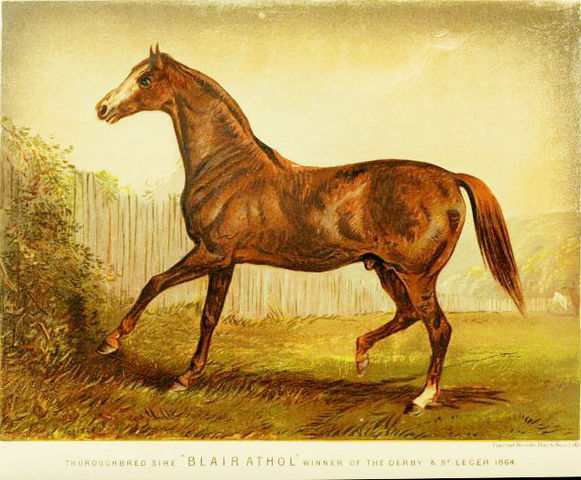
Blair Athol in retirement, by an unknown artist

Blair Athol began his stud career at the farm of John Jackson, the York bookmaker who had attempted to buy him as a two-year-old. Jackson paid £7,500 for Blair Athol, reported as the largest sum ever paid for a racehorse up to that time. When Jackson became ill in 1868 he sold off all his horses and Blair Athol was bought for £5,000 and moved to the Middle Park stud at Newmarket. In 1871, he was sold again, this time for £12,500 to the Cobham Stud Company.

Blair Athol was a highly successful stallion, being Champion sire four times between 1872 and 1877. His Classic winners included Silvio, Prince Charlie, Craig Millar, Cecilia and Scottish Queen. In 1878, his stud fee was raised to 200 guineas, leading to him being boycotted by most breeders who felt that the fee was excessive. In 1879, Blair Athol was sold for the final time, to the Pound Stud, also based at Cobham. He remained an impressive sight even in old age, and could regularly be seen exercising on the country lanes around Cobham. Blair Athol died in his stable in 1882.

== Pedigree ==
Pedigree of Blair Athol (GB), chestnut stallion, 1861
Sire Stockwell (GB) 1849	The Baron; 1842	Birdcatcher	Sir Hercules
Sire Stockwell (GB) 1849	The Baron; 1842	Birdcatcher	Guiccioli
Sire Stockwell (GB) 1849	The Baron; 1842	Echidna	Economist
Sire Stockwell (GB) 1849	The Baron; 1842	Echidna	Miss Pratt
Sire Stockwell (GB) 1849	Pocahontas; 1837	Glencoe	Sultan
Sire Stockwell (GB) 1849	Pocahontas; 1837	Glencoe	Trampoline
Sire Stockwell (GB) 1849	Pocahontas; 1837	Marpessa	Muley
Sire Stockwell (GB) 1849	Pocahontas; 1837	Marpessa	Clare
Dam Blink Bonny (GB) 1854	Melbourne; 1834	Humphrey Clinker	Comus
Dam Blink Bonny (GB) 1854	Melbourne; 1834	Humphrey Clinker	Clinkerina
Dam Blink Bonny (GB) 1854	Melbourne; 1834	Cervantes mare	Cervantes
Dam Blink Bonny (GB) 1854	Melbourne; 1834	Cervantes mare	Golumpus mare
Dam Blink Bonny (GB) 1854	Queen Mary; 1843	Gladiator	Partisan
Dam Blink Bonny (GB) 1854	Queen Mary; 1843	Gladiator	Pauline
Dam Blink Bonny (GB) 1854	Queen Mary; 1843	Plenipotentiary mare	Plenipotentiary
Dam Blink Bonny (GB) 1854	Queen Mary; 1843	Plenipotentiary mare	Myrrha(Family: 10-a)
