= Formosa (horse) =

British Thoroughbred racehorse

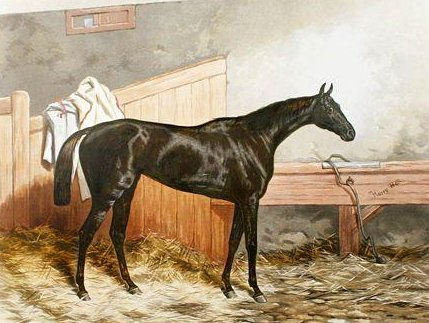
- Formosa in an 1868 painting by Harry Hall.
- Sire: Buccaneer
- Grandsire: Wild Dayrell
- Dam: Eller
- Damsire: Chanticleer
- Sex: Mare
- Foaled: 1865
- Country: United Kingdom
- Colour: Dark Chestnut
- Breeder: James Cookson
- Owner: William Graham
- Trainer: Henry Woolcott
- Record: 15: 7-3-1
- Earnings: £17,100 ($95,326)

Major wins
- Epsom Oaks (1868); St. Leger Stakes (1868); 1,000 Guineas Stakes (1868); 2,000 Guineas Stakes (1868)(dh)

Honours
- 1st Fillies Triple Crown (1868)

Formosa (1865–1881) was a British Thoroughbred racehorse that was the first winner of the English Fillies Triple Crown in addition to running a dead heat with the colt Moslem for the 2,000 Guineas Stakes. Formosa was bred by James Cookson and was foaled in 1865 at his Neasham Hall stud farm. Formosa was sold to William Graham (who raced under the pseudonym G. Jones) in 1866 and raced her entire three-year racing career under his ownership. After her racing career ended in 1871, she became a broodmare for Graham until his death in 1876. Formosa was exported to France in 1879 and died there in February 1881. While she did not produce offspring that excelled at racing, her daughters that were exported to Germany and New Zealand did produce descendants that were successful racers.

== Background ==
Formosa was foaled in 1865 in Neasham at the farm of her breeder James Cookson. Her sire, Buccaneer, was considered to "be the best horse of his year", winning the Mottisford Stakes as a two-year-old and the Royal Hunt Cup as a four-year-old. He had a difficult temperament and was branded as a "savage" before he was exported to Austria at the end of the 1865 breeding season. Formosa's dam, Eller, was a grey mare bred by Admiral Harcourt in 1856 and was a half-sister of Ellerdale, the dam of Epsom Derby winner Ellington and Epsom Oaks winner Summerside. Eller was a mediocre racehorse, winning one race during her career and finishing sixth to Summerside in the 1859 Epsom Oaks.

Formosa was purchased for 700 guineas at Doncaster in the autumn of 1866 by William Graham who had won the 1865 Oaks with Regalia and would win the 1870 Oaks with Gamos. William Graham (1808-1876) was born in Dufton Wood and was a successful wrestler in the 1820s and 1830s and was a part owner of a gin distillery. An account of the Doncaster yearling sale in The Sportsman relates that Cookson initially retained Formosa with a bid of 700 guineas, thought better of his decision to keep the filly, and approached Graham (who had been the second highest bidder at 690 guineas) about purchasing Formosa while Graham was eating breakfast. Graham reportedly "signed a cheque for 700 guineas without more ado, and then resumed his egg."

Formosa was named after the island of Formosa (now known as Taiwan), a notorious pirate stronghold in the 17th century. She was a dark chestnut, well-muscled filly, that stood 15.1 hands high and was noted by the British Farmer's Magazine to have "a pleasing head", a "strong, slightly crested neck" and "unexceptionable legs, upon which she stands as firm as a rock."

== Racing career ==
Formosa was trained at Beckhampton by Henry Woolcott. William Graham used pseudonyms when entering his horses in races. For Formosa and his 1870 Oaks winner Gamos, he used the name G. Jones. Formosa was the first filly to win The Oaks, St. Leger Stakes and 1,000 Guineas Stakes, a series of races now designated as the Fillies Triple Crown. Formosa also tied with the colt Moslem for the 2,000 Guineas Stakes, but Moslem was declared the official winner after a run-off race was declined by Formosa's connections.

=== 1867: two-year-old season ===
In the first start of her racing career, Formosa finished unplaced in the Weston Stakes held at Bath. She again finished unplaced in the Ascot Queen's Stand Plate and was third in the Triennial Stakes and fourth in the Biennial Stakes run at the same meeting. Her first win occurred at Stockbridge for the Nursery Stakes, where she beat the Duke of Hamilton's filly Contempt by two lengths. At the July meeting at Newmarket, Formosa won the Chesterfield Stakes at 20 to 1 odds, beating the filly Léonie, the colt Suffolk and the betting favourite Athena. Formosa finished third and last in the Bentinck Memorial at Goodwood and won a £235 race at Abingdon. In her final engagement of the year, Formosa was unplaced behind the filly Green Sleeves in the Middle Park Plate.

=== 1868: three-year-old season ===
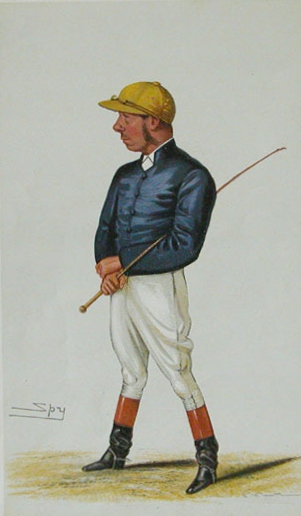
Formosa was ridden by George Fordham in most of her Classic racing engagements.

==== Spring ====
On 28 April, Formosa ran against thirteen opponents in the 2,000 Guineas Stakes over the Rowley mile course at Newmarket where she disputed favouritism with Green Sleeves. From soon after the start, Formosa and a colt named Moslem showed ahead of the rest of the field and pulled three lengths clear by half way. Moslem held a slight advantage for most of the way, but George Fordham moved Formosa up to challenge him in the final furlong and the two horses crossed the line together in what was described as "one of the finest struggles" in the race's history. The judge declared a dead heat, meaning that the two horses would run again over the same course unless the owners agreed to divide the prize money. The deciding heat was almost immediately scheduled for the end of the day's racing but half an hour later it was announced that the owners had agreed to divide the stakes. Moslem however, was allowed to walk-over in the decider, and was treated as the winner for betting purposes. Two days later Formosa started 5/6 favourite for the 1,000 Guineas Stakes. She was amongst the leaders from the start before drawing clear inside the final furlong to win very easily by three lengths from Athena and Lady Coventry.

On 29 May, Formosa started in the Oaks Stakes against a field of nine horses, including Lady Coventry, Athena and Lady Elisabeth. On the morning of the running, a violent thunderstorm occurred over Epsom Downs with heavy rains, hail and lightning strikes. The rains continued until two hours before the 3-o'clock race. The betting favourite was Lady Elisabeth, whose odds were improved due to her recent running in the Epsom Derby. Formosa's stable companion Janet Rawcliffe was entered in the race to be a pace setter for Formosa. At the start, Fair Star and Janet Rawcliffe were early pacesetters but were soon overtaken at the half-mile marker by Formosa, who quickened the pace. Formosa, ridden by Fordham held on to a three-length lead into the straight over Virtue, Léonie and Curfew Bell, who faded and dropped back. Formosa finished the race 10 lengths ahead of the second place filly, Lady Coventry, with Athena following six lengths behind for third place.

==== Summer ====
On 9 June at Ascot, Formosa finished sixth in the one mile and five furlong Prince of Wales's Stakes, the race being won by Baron Rothschild's colt King Alfred. Moslem also ran and was third. A few days later at the same meeting, Formosa finished second to Lord Stamford's colt Vale Royal in the mile-long, £466 Triennial Stakes. Formosa started at 11 to 8 odds and was beaten by a length by Vale Royal, with Restitution finishing third four lengths behind Formosa.

==== Autumn ====
At Doncaster on 9 September, Formosa contested the St. Leger Stakes against eleven other horses, including previous rivals Virtue and King Alfred as well as Mr. Hodgman's Chester Cup winner Paul Jones. She was made 100/30 favorite and was ridden by Tom Chaloner. Formosa was not among the early leaders, but moved steadily forward to turn into the straight in third place behind Paul Jones and Mercury. Mercury weakened and Chaloner moved the filly up to dispute the lead with Paul Jones approaching the final furlong. Chaloner never had to resort to the whip, as Formosa drew clear to win by three lengths. The filly's success was welcomed by "loud and prolonged" cheering from the Doncaster crowd.

=== 1869: four-year-old season ===
Formosa was fifth to the mare Sycee in the Lincolnshire Handicap run in February at Lincoln. At Epsom on 30 March, Formosa lost the Trial Stakes by head from the 1868 Epsom Derby winner Blue Gown. Her first win as a four-year-old occurred at Bath on 18 May for the Lansdown Trial Stakes, winning by two lengths against Captain Machell's three-year-old filly Crown Princess. An additional win occurred at Ascot in June for the Triennial Stakes with Formosa narrowly winning by a neck over Restitution. A few days later, Formosa finished third in the Ascot Gold Cup, losing to the three-year-old filly Brigantine (the 1869 Oaks winner and also sired by Buccaneer) and Blue Gown. on 24 June at Stockbridge, Formosa was second to Guy Dayrell for the Stockbridge Cup. At the same meeting, Formosa was second to Brigantine in the Hurstbourne Cup run at Newmarket. At Goodwood in July, Formosa won the Bentinck Memorial by a wide margin, 40 lengths, from the gelding Blueskin. On 31 August, Formosa won the 100-guinea Her Majesty's Plate at Weymouth. In what would ultimately be her last win of the season, Formosa won by half a length from the colt Arlington. At the September Doncaster meeting, Formosa was fourth in the Great Yorkshire Handicap, losing to the colts Géant des Batailles, Argyle and Paul Jones. Formosa was second to Rosicrucian by a neck in the Newmarket All-aged Stakes in October. In Liverpool in November, Formosa finished fourth in the one and a half mile Liverpool Autumn Cup, losing to Lambton, Cocoa Nut and Lopez.

=== 1870: five-year-old season ===
In her first start of the year in May, Formosa was second in the two-mile and two-furlong Tradesman's Plate run at Chester, losing to the mare Our Mary Ann. In June at Ascot, Formosa was beaten by Siderolite in the running for the two-mile Gold Vase. At the July meeting at Newmarket, Formosa was beaten by ten lengths by the 5-year-old mare Mysotia in the running for the £105 Queen's Plate. The Sporting Review commented on Formosa's poor form during the season, "[she] is being hacked about all over the country and losing her reputation by being beaten for paltry prizes over cup courses when she has shown again and again that like all the Buccaneers she is not a genuine stayer."

== Stud career ==
Formosa was retired in 1871 to Mr. Graham's stud farm and remained there until Graham's death on 19 January 1876. Formosa was bought in August 1876 by Thomas Gee of Dewhurst Lodge for 2,700 guineas at the Newmarket yearling sales with her filly foal sired by Winslow, later named White Poppy. After being barren for two breeding seasons, Formosa was auctioned again in July 1879 in foal to Hermit and was bought by M. Lefevre for 1,000 guineas. Lefevre exported her to his stud farm in Chamant. Her 1880 filly by Hermit was foaled in France and was named Formalité. Formosa died at Lefevre's stud in France in February 1881.

=== Full progeny list ===
- 1872: Worthless, chestnut colt by Orest.
- 1873: Pulcherrima, brown filly by Beadsman. In 1876, Pulcherrima was sold and exported to the Prussian government. Pulcherrima produced three German Classic winners when bred to Chamant, the Deutsches St. Leger winners Picollos and Pumpernickel and the Deutsches Derby winner Potrimpos.
- 1874: Pulchra, bay filly by Rosicrucian. Pulchra was sent to New Zealand in 1879.
- 1875: Callistos, chestnut colt by Lord Clifden. Callistos was win-less in all his starts as a two and four-year-old and was exported to Buenos Aires in 1882.
- 1876: White Poppy, bay filly by Winslow. White Poppy finished tenth in the 1879 St. Leger Stakes. White Poppy was covered by Springfield and was exported to Germany in 1889 with her 1889 filly foal by Camballo.
- 1877: Zenobia, brown filly by Young Melbourne. Zenobia was covered by Hermit and exported to France in 1889.
- 1878: Barren
- 1879: Barren, exported to France covered by Hermit.
- 1880: Formalité, filly by Hermit. Formalité raced in England and France, winning the 1884 La Coupe.

== Pedigree ==
Pedigree of Formosa (GB), Chestnut filly, 1865
Sire Buccaneer (GB) Chestnut, 1857	Wild Dayrell; 1852	Ion	Cain
Sire Buccaneer (GB) Chestnut, 1857	Wild Dayrell; 1852	Ion	Margaret
Sire Buccaneer (GB) Chestnut, 1857	Wild Dayrell; 1852	Ellen Middleton	Bay Middleton
Sire Buccaneer (GB) Chestnut, 1857	Wild Dayrell; 1852	Ellen Middleton	Myrrha
Sire Buccaneer (GB) Chestnut, 1857	Little Red Rover Mare; 1841	Little Red Rover	Tramp
Sire Buccaneer (GB) Chestnut, 1857	Little Red Rover Mare; 1841	Little Red Rover	Miss Syntax
Sire Buccaneer (GB) Chestnut, 1857	Little Red Rover Mare; 1841	Eclat	Edmund
Sire Buccaneer (GB) Chestnut, 1857	Little Red Rover Mare; 1841	Eclat	Squib
Dam Eller (GB) Grey, 1856	Chanticleer; 1843	Birdcatcher	Sir Hercules
Dam Eller (GB) Grey, 1856	Chanticleer; 1843	Birdcatcher	Guiccioli
Dam Eller (GB) Grey, 1856	Chanticleer; 1843	Whim	Drone
Dam Eller (GB) Grey, 1856	Chanticleer; 1843	Whim	Kiss
Dam Eller (GB) Grey, 1856	Tomboy Mare; 1838	Tomboy	Jerry
Dam Eller (GB) Grey, 1856	Tomboy Mare; 1838	Tomboy	Ardrossan Mare
Dam Eller (GB) Grey, 1856	Tomboy Mare; 1838	Tesane	Whisker
Dam Eller (GB) Grey, 1856	Tomboy Mare; 1838	Tesane	Lady of the Trees (Family 18-a)
