= Springfield (horse) =

British-bred Thoroughbred racehorse

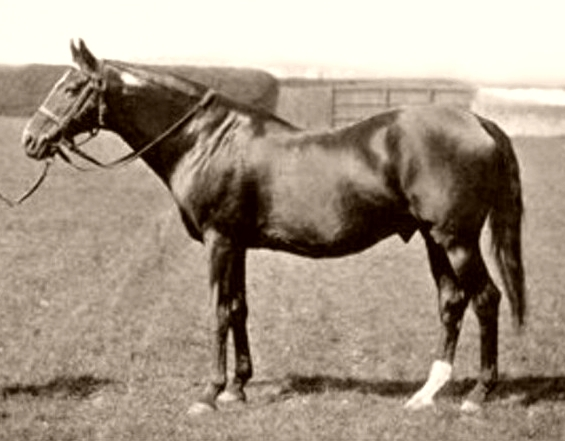
- Sire: St. Albans
- Grandsire: Stockwell
- Dam: Viridis
- Damsire: Marsyas
- Sex: Stallion
- Foaled: 1873
- Died: 1898 (aged 24–25)
- Country: England
- Colour: Bay
- Owner: Mr J.H. Houldsworth
- Trainer: James Ryan
- Record: 19: 17 wins, 2 seconds
- Earnings: £8,920

Major wins
- 1875 Gimcrack Stakes; 1876, 1877 July Cup; 1877 Queen's Stand Plate; 1877 Champion Stakes
- Last updated on 25 September 2011

Springfield (1873–1898) was a successful English Thoroughbred racehorse that won 14 consecutive races and was a useful sire of the late 19th century. He was the grandsire of two English Triple Crown winners: Galtee More, who was exported to Russia, and later Germany and Rock Sand, who was exported to the U.S. and in turn was the grandsire of Man o' War, widely considered one of the greatest racehorses of all time.

He was a bay colt foaled in 1873 at Bushy Park Paddocks at Hampton Court. Springfield was sired by the St. Leger Stakes winner St. Albans, his dam was Queen Victoria's Viridis by Marsyas (who won the July Cup, and later sired The Derby winner George Frederick). He was sold as a yearling and purchased by J.H. Houldsworth for 320 guineas. Springfield was line-bred to Sultan in the fourth and fifth generation of his pedigree (5m x 4f).

== Racing record ==
=== At two years ===
Springfield won his first start, the Prince of Wales's Plate at York and the following day won the six-furlong Gimcrack Stakes. In October he had a victory in the four furlongs Two Year Old Stakes at Newmarket. Following this Springfield then finished second in the Criterion Stakes defeated by a head from Clanronald and another second in the Dewhurst Stakes to the future Epsom Derby winner Kisber, These were the only times that he was defeated during his racing career,

=== At three years ===
Springfield was undefeated as a three-year-old, winning nine races, two of which were walk-overs. The wins included the July Cup, Goodwood's Bagnor Stakes, and the Bradgate Stakes at Doncaster. He won twice at Royal Ascot, taking the Fern Hill Stakes and the New Biennial Stakes.

=== At four years ===
In 1877 he was again undefeated in his five starts, which included victories in the Queen's Stand Plate, the July Cup. His final race was the 1¼ mile Champion Stakes in which he defeated The Derby winner Silvio.

Springfield finished his racing career with 19 starts, 17 wins and 2 seconds for earnings of £8,920.

== Stud record ==
Springfield stood at Bushey Paddocks at Hampton Court for an initial fee of 100 guineas, later rising to 200 guineas. After the Royal Stud was dispersed Springfield was transferred to Houldsworth's Newmarket stud.

His progeny included:

| Foaled | Name | Sex | Major Wins/Achievements |
|---|---|---|---|
| 1887 | Sainfoin | Stallion | Epsom Derby |
| 1892 | Pastorella | Mare | |
| | Agave | Mare | |
| | Briar Root | Mare | 1000 Guineas Stakes |
| | Morganette | Mare | |
| | Ponza | Stallion | Sire in Australia |
| | Sierra | Mare | |
| | Speedwell | Stallion | Middle Park Stakes |
| | Sunshower | Mare | |

He died on 31 March 1898, age 25.

== See also ==
- List of leading Thoroughbred racehorses
