= British Classic Races =

Five British Group 1 horse races for three-year-olds

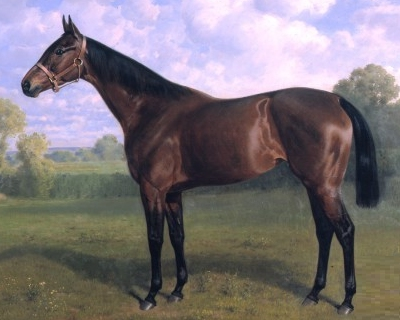
Sceptre, the only outright winner of four classics, painted by Emil Adam

The British Classics are five long-standing Group 1 horse races run during the traditional flat racing season. They are restricted to three-year-old horses, and traditionally represent the pinnacle of achievement for racehorses against their own age group. As such, victory in any classic marks a horse as amongst the very best of a generation. Victory in two or even three of the series (a rare feat known as the Triple Crown) marks a horse as truly exceptional.

== Races ==
The five British Classics are:

Race	Date	Distance	Course	First Run	Qualification
2,000 Guineas Stakes	Late April / early May	1 mile (1,609 m)	Newmarket	1809	Three-year-old colts and fillies
1,000 Guineas Stakes	Late April / early May	1 mile (1,609 m)	Newmarket	1814	Three-year-old fillies
The Oaks	Late May / early June	1 mile 4 furlongs 10 yd (2,423 m)	Epsom Downs	1779	Three-year-old fillies
The Derby	First Saturday in June	1 mile 4 furlongs 10 yd (2,423 m)	Epsom Downs	1780	Three-year-old colts and fillies
St Leger Stakes	September	1 mile 6 furlongs 132 yd (2,937 m)	Doncaster	1776	Three-year-old colts and fillies

It is common to think of them as taking place in three legs.

The first leg is made up of the Newmarket Classics – 1000 Guineas and 2000 Guineas. Given that the 1,000 Guineas is restricted to fillies, this is regarded as the fillies' classic and the 2,000, which is open to both sexes, as the colts' classic, although it is possible for a filly to compete in both.

The second leg is made up of The Derby and/or Oaks, both ridden over 1 1/2 miles at Epsom in early June. The Oaks is regarded as the fillies' classic, the Derby as the colts', although as with the Guineas, a filly could contest both.

The final leg is the St Leger, held over 1 mile 6 1/2 furlongs at Doncaster, which is open to both sexes.

The variety of distances and racecourses faced in the Classics make them particularly challenging as a series to even the best horses. It is rare for a horse to possess both the speed and stamina to compete across all these distances, making the Triple Crown a particularly notable achievement. In fact, in the modern era, it is rare for any attempt on the Triple Crown to be made.

Geldings are excluded from the 2000 Guineas, Derby and St Leger, in common with all European Group One races restricted to three-year-olds.

== History ==
The oldest race in the series, the St Leger, was first run in 1776. The races were designated "classics" in 1815, shortly after the first 1,000 Guineas Stakes.

On 12 September 2026, Saffie Osborne won the St Leger; it was the first time a female jockey had won a British Classic race.

== Multiple winners ==
(see also Triple Crown of Thoroughbred Racing)

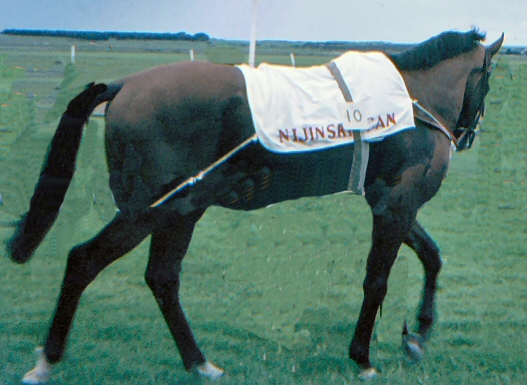
Nijinsky, the last winner of the Triple Crown in 1970

In 1902 Sceptre became the only racehorse to win four British Classic Races outright, winning both Guineas, the Oaks and the St Leger. Previously, in 1868, Formosa won the same four races but dead-heated in the 2,000 Guineas.

Fifteen horses have won the standard Triple Crown (2,000 Guineas – Derby – St Leger), the last being Nijinsky in 1970. Three of these achieved the feat during the World War I when all five Classic races were run at Newmarket.

In addition to Sceptre and Formosa above, eight horses have won the fillies' Triple Crown (1,000 Guineas – Oaks – St Leger), the last being Oh So Sharp in 1985. 1882 is the only year in which fillies have won all five of the year's British Classic Races.

Many horses have won two classics, some of whom have gone on to attempt the Triple Crown, losing in the last leg at Doncaster. The most recent example of this was the Aidan O'Brien–trained Camelot, who finished second in the St Leger in 2012 after winning the 2,000 Guineas and Derby.

=== Four-time ===
- Formosa 1868
- Sceptre 1902

=== Three-time ===
- Crucifix 1840
- West Australian 1853
- Gladiateur 1865
- Lord Lyon 1866
- Hannah 1871
- Apology 1874
- Ormonde 1886
- Common 1891
- La Fleche 1892
- Isinglass 1893
- Galtee More 1897
- Flying Fox 1899
- Diamond Jubilee 1900
- Rock Sand 1903
- Pretty Polly 1904
- Pommern 1915
- Gay Crusader 1917
- Gainsborough 1918
- Bahram 1935
- Sun Chariot 1942
- Meld 1955
- Nijinsky 1970
- Oh So Sharp 1985

=== Two-time ===
- Champion (1800)
- Eleanor (1801)
- Smolensko (1813)
- Neva (1817)
- Corinne (1818)
- Pastille (1822)
- Zinc (1823)
- Cobweb (1824)
- Cadland (1828)
- Galata (1832)
- Queen of Trumps (1835)
- Bay Middleton (1836)
- Cotherstone (1843)
- Mendicant (1846)
- Sir Tatton Sykes (1846)
- Surplice (1848)
- The Flying Dutchman (1849)
- Voltigeur (1850)
- Stockwell (1852)
- Blink Bonny (1857)
- Imperieuse (1857)
- Governess (1858)
- The Marquis (1862)
- Macaroni (1863)
- Blair Athol (1864)
- Achievement (1867)
- Pretender (1869)
- Reine (1872)
- Marie Stuart (1873)
- Spinaway (1875)
- Camelia (1876)
- Petrarch (1876)
- Silvio (1877)
- Jannette (1878)
- Pilgrimage (1878)
- Wheel of Fortune (1879)
- Iroquois (1881)
- Thebais (1881)
- Shotover (1882)
- Busybody (1884)
- Melton (1885)
- Miss Jummy (1886)
- Reve d'Or (1887)
- Ayrshire (1888)
- Seabreeze (1888)
- Donovan (1889)
- Memoir (1890)
- Mimi (1891)
- Amiable (1894)
- Ladas (1894)
- Sir Visto (1895)
- Persimmon (1896)
- St Amant (1904)
- Cherry Lass (1905)
- Signorinetta (1908)
- Minoru (1909)
- Sunstar (1911)
- Tagalie (1912)
- Jest (1913)
- Princess Dorrie (1914)
- Fifinella (1916)
- Tranquil (1923)
- Manna (1925)
- Saucy Sue (1925)
- Coronach (1926)
- Trigo (1929)
- Cameronian (1931)
- Hyperion (1933)
- Windsor Lad (1934)
- Exhibitionnist (1937)
- Rockfel (1938)
- Blue Peter (1939)
- Galatea (1939)
- Godiva (1940)
- Herringbone (1943)
- Sun Stream (1945)
- Airborne (1946)
- Imprudence (1947)
- Musidora (1949)
- Nimbus (1949)
- Tulyar (1952)
- Never Say Die (1954)
- Crepello (1957)
- Bella Paola (1958)
- Petite Etoile (1959)
- Never Too Late (1960)
- St Paddy (1960)
- Sweet Solera (1961)
- Royal Palace (1967)
- Sir Ivor (1968)
- Altesse Royale (1971)
- Mysterious (1973)
- Dunfermline (1977)
- Sun Princess (1983)
- Midway Lady (1986)
- Reference Point (1987)
- Nashwan (1989)
- Salsabil (1990)
- User Friendly (1992)
- Kazzia (2002)
- Sea The Stars (2009)
- Camelot (2012)
- Minding (2016)
- Love (2020)

== Records ==
Most wins as a horse

- Sceptre – 4 wins (1902)

Most wins as a jockey

- Lester Piggott – 30 wins (1954–1992)

Most wins as a trainer

- Aidan O'Brien – 41 wins (1998–present)

== See also ==
- Category:British Classic Race winners
- English Triple Crown race winners
- French Classic Races
- Japanese Classic Races
- Irish Classic Races
- United States Triple Crown of Thoroughbred Racing
- Canadian Triple Crown of Thoroughbred Racing
