= Silvio (horse) =

British Thoroughbred racehorse

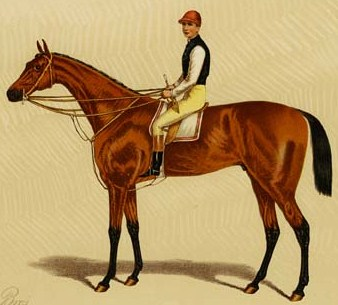
- Ink drawing of Silvio with Fred Archer
- Sire: Blair Athol
- Grandsire: Stockwell
- Dam: Silverhair
- Damsire: England's Beauty
- Sex: Stallion
- Foaled: 1874
- Country: United Kingdom of Great Britain and Ireland
- Colour: Bay
- Breeder: Evelyn Boscawen, 6th Viscount Falmouth
- Owner: Lord Falmouth
- Trainer: Mathew Dawson
- Record: 19: 10-7-1
- Earnings: £

Major wins
- Epsom Derby (1877); Ascot Derby (1877); St Leger (1877); Jockey Club Cup (1878)

Awards
- Leading British money winner (1877); Leading Sire in France (1886)

Silvio (1874–1890) was a British Thoroughbred racehorse and sire. In a career that lasted from 1874 to 1877 he ran eight times and won three races. In 1877 he won The Derby and the St Leger. At the end of the 1877 season he was retired to stud where he had success both in England and France.

== Background ==
Silvio was bred by his owner Evelyn Boscawen, 6th Viscount Falmouth at his stud at Mereworth Castle in Kent. He was sent into training with Mathew Dawson at his Heath House stables at Newmarket, Suffolk. His sire, Blair Athol, was an outstanding racehorse who won the Derby and the St Leger in 1864 and went on to be Champion Sire on four occasions. Silvio's dam, Silverhair, was a successful racehorse and produced other winners including the colt Garterly Bell, who finished fourth in the 1875 Derby, and the filly Silver Ring, who won six races including the Bretby Stakes.

== Racing career ==
=== 1876: two-year-old season ===
As a two-year-old in 1876, Silvio showed promising form to win four of his five races. On his racecourse debut, Silvio won the Ham Stakes at Goodwood. He then won three races at Newmarket: the Clearwell Stakes on 2 October, the Post Stakes, and the Glasgow Stakes in which he was the only starter and walked over. He then finished second to the French colt Verneuil in the Buckenham Stakes.

=== 1877: three-year-old season ===
Silvio began the season being regarded as the second string of Lord Falmouth's horses behind the filly, Lady Golightly, and was offered at odds of 33/1 for the Derby in late March. On his seasonal debut he was strongly fancied for the Newmarket Biennial Stakes in mid-April, but finished unplaced behind Grey Friar. The race was run in a violent storm, leading some observers to suggest that the form was not very reliable. On 3 May he showed much improved form in the 2000 Guineas in which he started at odds of 100/6 (16/1). Ridden by the Champion Jockey Fred Archer he finished third, beaten just over a length behind the French-bred favourite Chamant and the American Brown Prince.

On 30 May at Epsom, Silvio started at odds of 100/9 (11/1) against sixteen opponents in the Derby. Ridden again by Archer, he was settled in the middle of the field in the early stages and turned into the straight just behind the leaders. Silvio moved into second place two furlongs from the finish and passed Glen Arthur to take the lead a hundred yards from the line. He won "cleverly" by half a length from Glen Arthur, with Rob Roy, who may have been unlucky in running, three quarters of a length further back in third In mid-June, Silvio beat Glen Arthur much more decisively in the Ascot Derby, the race now called the King Edward VII Stakes, despite carrying a weight penalty for his Derby win.

On 12 September at Doncaster, Silvio started 13/8 favourite in a field of fourteen for the St Leger. He took the lead early in the straight and won very easily by three lengths from his stable companion Lady Golightly, with another filly, Manoeuvre in third. On his final start of the year he was no match for Springfield in Champion Stakes over ten furlongs.

Silvio's earnings of £12,150 made him the biggest money winner of the season in Britain.

=== 1878: four-year-old season ===
On his four-year-old debut Silvio ran in the Biennial Stakes at Newmarket in April and won easily by three lengths from Rifle. On the 2000 Guineas card two weeks later he won the Newmarket Prince of Wales's Stakes in which he gave ten pounds to his only rival Thunderstone and won very easily. In the Gold Cup at Royal Ascot in June he was never able to get on level terms with Verneuil and finished second, beaten six lengths, ahead of the Grand Prix de Paris winner St Christophe and Hampton. Speculation concerning a match race between Silvio and the 1876 Derby winner Kisber at York came to nothing.

At Newmarket in October Silvio ran against his stable companion Jannette, the 1878 St Leger winner, in the Champion Stakes. He led from the start but was caught by the filly, to whom he was attempting to concede fifteen pounds, inside the final furlong and was beaten by a neck. He finished well ahead of Verneuil, Glen Arthur and Petrarch. On his last start of the season he recorded his most important win in over a year when he won the Jockey Club Cup very easily from Insulaire.

=== 1879: five-year-old season ===
Silvio stayed in training as a five-year-old but failed to win. In June he ran twice at Royal Ascot firstly in the Gold Vase on the opening day for which he started odds-on favourite but was beaten half a length by Isonomy, who was receiving seven pounds. Isonomy went on to be the most successful horse of the season in England. Two days later he started odds-on again in the Hardwicke Stakes, avoiding a rematch with Isonomy in the Gold Cup. He took the lead in the straight and looked certain to win, but was caught in the last strides by the three-year-old Chippendale, and beaten by a head. Silvio was attempting to concede twenty-four pounds to the winner.

At the July meeting at Newmarket, Silvio was beaten a head by the four-year-old Phoenix after a "magnificent race" for the Bunbury Stakes.

== Stud career ==
Silvio began his stud career in England and had little impact. He was sold for £7,000 to the Duc de Castries and exported to France after two seasons and was more successful becoming leading French sire in 1886. His winners in France included May Pole (Poule d'Essai des Pouliches), Jupin (Prix Lupin) and Viennois (Prix d'Ispahan) In April 1890 he sustained a fetlock injury which became infected, and, despite veterinary treatment, Silvio had to be euthanized soon afterwards.

== Pedigree ==
Pedigree of Silvio (GB), bay stallion, 1874
Sire Blair Athol (GB) 1861	Stockwell; 1849	The Baron	Birdcatcher
Sire Blair Athol (GB) 1861	Stockwell; 1849	The Baron	Echidna
Sire Blair Athol (GB) 1861	Stockwell; 1849	Pocahontas	Glencoe
Sire Blair Athol (GB) 1861	Stockwell; 1849	Pocahontas	Marpessa
Sire Blair Athol (GB) 1861	Blink Bonny; 1854	Melbourne	Humphrey Clinker
Sire Blair Athol (GB) 1861	Blink Bonny; 1854	Melbourne	Cervantes mare
Sire Blair Athol (GB) 1861	Blink Bonny; 1854	Queen Mary	Gladiator
Sire Blair Athol (GB) 1861	Blink Bonny; 1854	Queen Mary	Plenipotentiary mare
Dam Silverhair (GB) 1858	Kingston; 1849	Venison	Partisan
Dam Silverhair (GB) 1858	Kingston; 1849	Venison	Fawn
Dam Silverhair (GB) 1858	Kingston; 1849	Queen Anne	Slane
Dam Silverhair (GB) 1858	Kingston; 1849	Queen Anne	Garcia
Dam Silverhair (GB) 1858	England's Beauty; 1850	Birdcatcher	Sir Hercules
Dam Silverhair (GB) 1858	England's Beauty; 1850	Birdcatcher	Guiccioli
Dam Silverhair (GB) 1858	England's Beauty; 1850	The Prairie Bird	Touchstone
Dam Silverhair (GB) 1858	England's Beauty; 1850	The Prairie Bird	Zillah (Family: 1-o)
