= Graditz =

- Ortsteil of Torgau
- Interactive map of Graditz
- Location within Germany Location within Saxony
- Coordinates: 51°32′40″N 13°03′35″E
- Country: Germany
- State: Saxony
- District: Nordsachsen
- Town: Torgau
- Elevation: 84 m (276 ft)

Population
  - Total: 250
- Time zone: UTC+01:00 (CET)
  - Summer (DST): UTC+02:00 (CEST)
- Postal codes: 04860
- Dialling codes: 03421
- Vehicle registration: TDO

Graditz (German pronunciation: [ˈɡʁaːdɪts]) is a village and a former municipality of 250 inhabitants in the Nordsachsen landkreis of Saxony. Formerly an independent municipality, it was absorbed by Torgau in 1994.

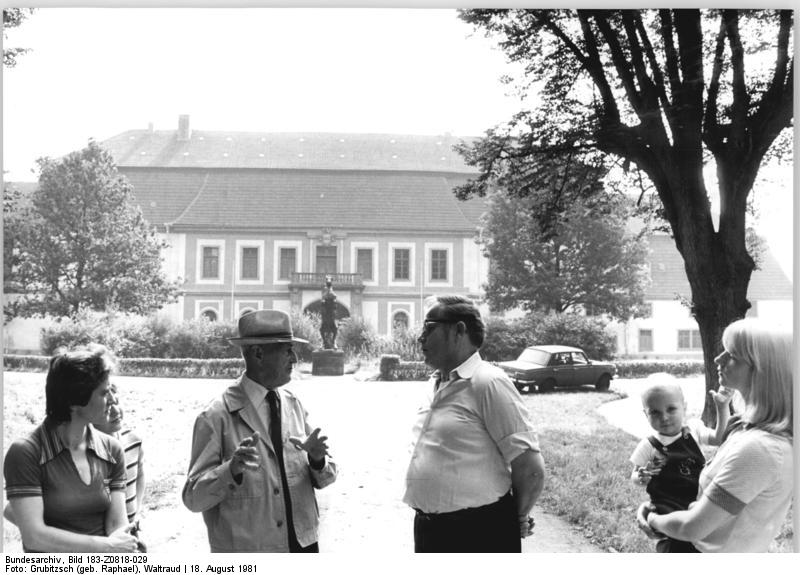
A guide showing tourists around Graditz in 1981.
