= Bay Middleton =

English horseman, equerry to John Spencer, 5th Earl Spencer (1846–1892)

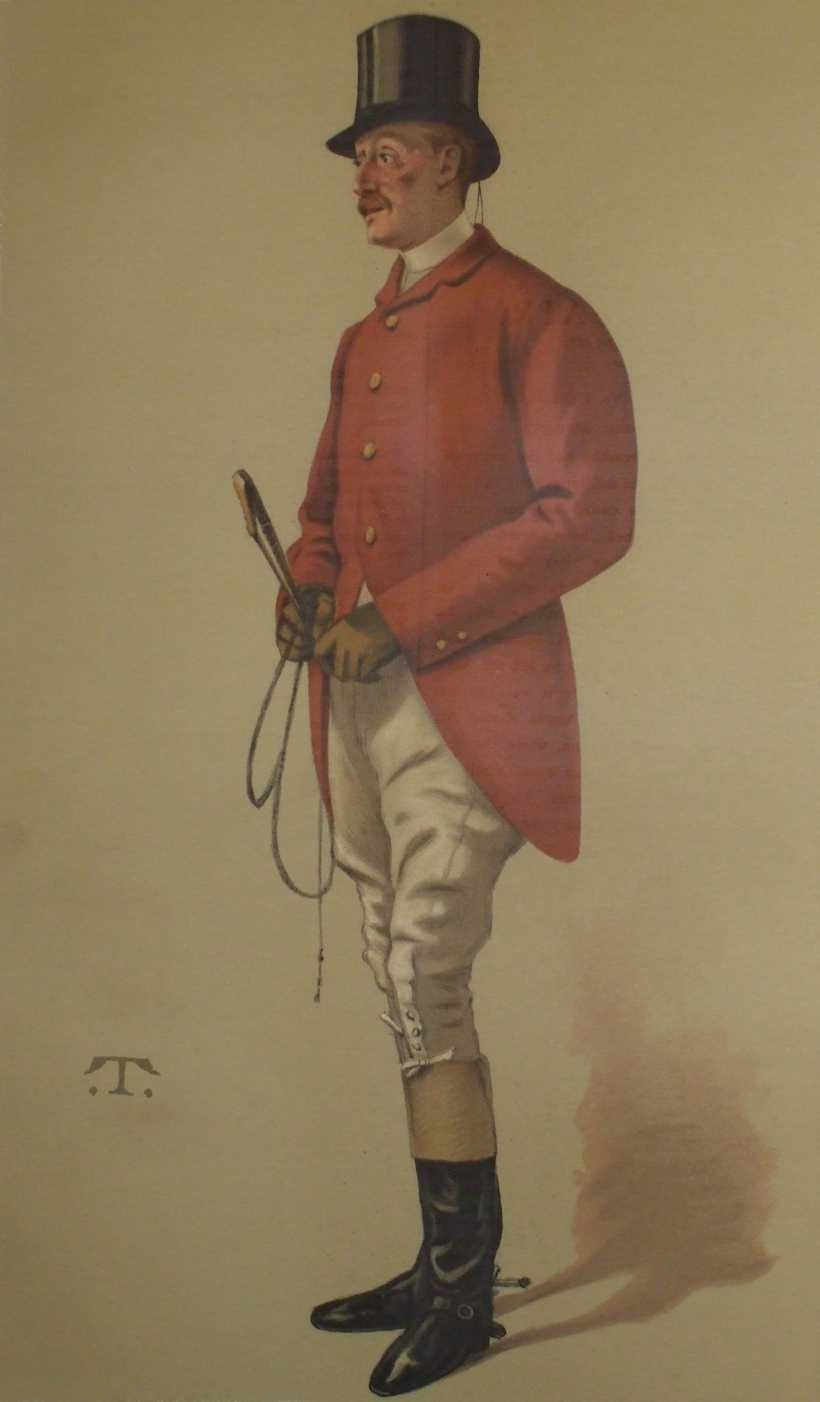
"Bay". Caricature by Chartran published in Vanity Fair in 1883

Captain William George Middleton (16 April 1846 – 9 April 1892) was a noted British horseman, officer of the Royal Lancers, and equerry to Lord Spencer, Lord Lieutenant of Ireland. He was described as "one of the best riders to hounds that ever lived, an amusing dare-devil and very good company."

His nickname "Bay" was either a reference to his reddish-brown hair, or derived from the name of the winner of The Derby in 1836.

== Biography ==
=== Early life ===
William George Middleton was born at Barony, Glasgow, Lanarkshire, Scotland, the son of George Middleton and Mary Margaret Hamilton. He was born into a Scottish family with sporting traditions. He attended the Glasgow Academy. The family having moved to London, he was privately tutored at Wimbledon.

=== Career ===
Middleton was gazetted to the 12th Lancers in 1865, and stationed in Cahir in County Tipperary. He rode his first Winning Race in 1867 at Cork Park. He joined the Lord Lieutenant's staff as an aide-de-camp in 1870, where he was based at the Viceregal Lodge in Dublin, was promoted to captain and left services. Middleton was one of the best and most popular riders in the United Kingdom. He repeatedly rode the winners over the stiffest steeplechase courses, including the Punchestown (Ireland) Grand National. Besides being distinguished as a horseman, he was a good cricketer, belonging to the Jockey Cricket Club.

=== Empress of Austria ===
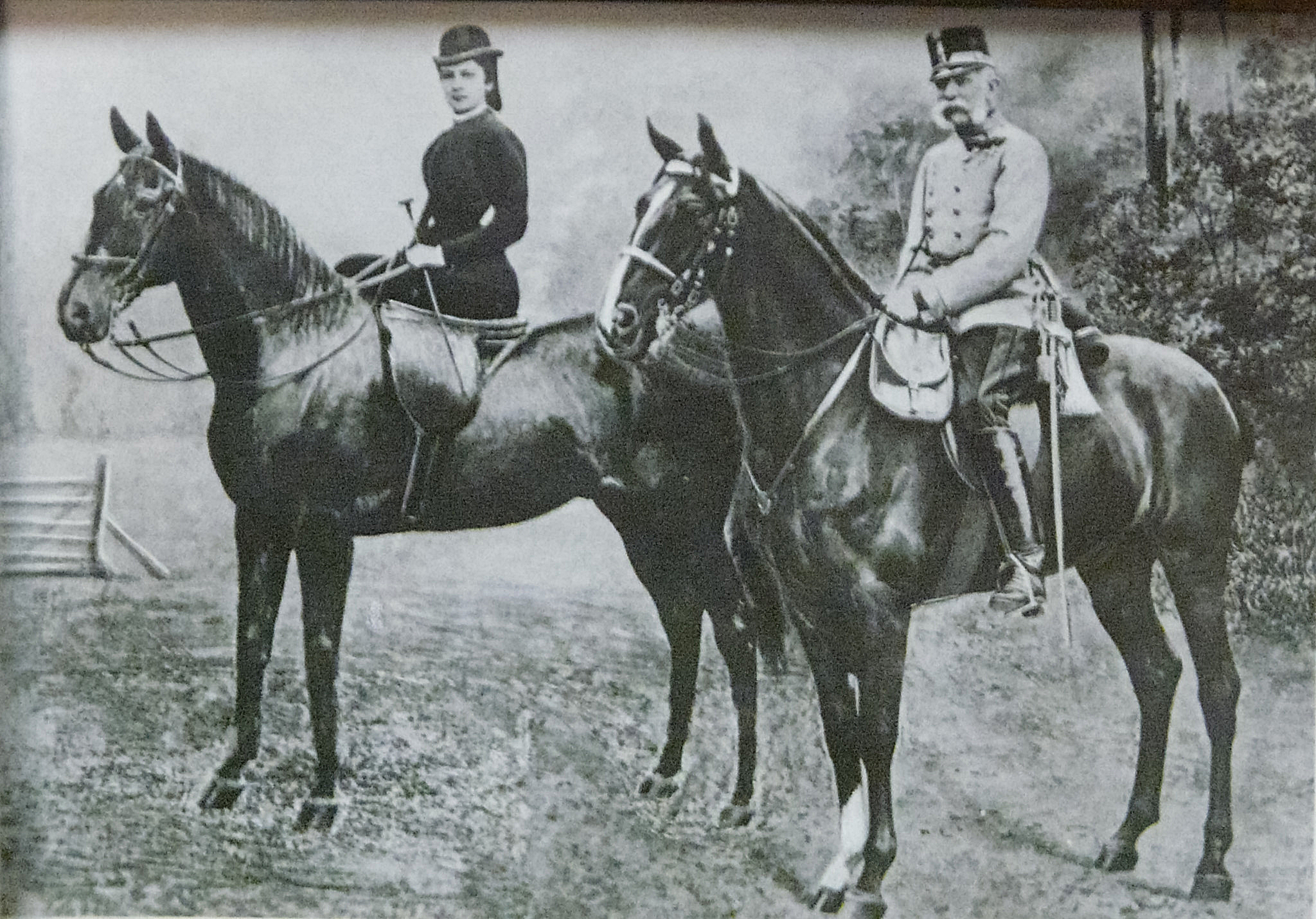
The Emperor and Empress of Austria

The Empress Elisabeth of Austria ("Sisi") visited England, arriving on 2 August 1874, where she met the Earl Spencer and his equerry Middleton. When she returned to England in 1876, she visited Lord Spencer at Althorp, and Bay Middleton was asked to "pilot" the Empress. She left England in February 1882 and never hunted in England or Ireland again.

On 20 March 1888 Middleton visited Empress Elisabeth at her palace in Gödöllő in Hungary. That was the last time they are known to have met.

=== Marriage ===
In 1875, Middleton became engaged to Charlotte Baird, daughter of William Baird, of Elie, whom he married on 25 October 1882 at St. George's, Hanover Square. The couple had one daughter, Violet Georgiana, born in 1886. His wife had been jealous of his long relationship with the beautiful Empress, even though there is no evidence of any improper behaviour. She destroyed all her letters to Middleton after his death.

=== Death ===
Captain William George Middleton died at age 45 in the Midland Sportsman's Cup at Lord Willoughby de Broke's estate at Kineton, killed in a fall from his horse at the Parliamentary steeplechase. He was buried in full riding costume at Haselbech, Northamptonshire. His coffin was kept in the parish church, covered with the Union Jack and flanked with lances of the 12th Lancers, Middleton's regiment. A large assembly of mourners gathered to attend the funeral service, which was conducted by the Rev. W. Lloyd, the rector. Among the mourners were the widow and the deceased's only (officially acknowledged) child, a little girl of six. Earl Spencer, Lord and Lady Willoughby de Broke, Sir Saville Crossley, M.P., Mr. Albert Pell, Captain William Cossley Atherton, Mr. Charles. W. B. Fernie, General Le Quesne, and many others who were well known in the hunting field also attended Middleton's funeral.

== In ballet, literature and film ==
Middleton appears as the Empress's lover in Kenneth MacMillan's ballet Mayerling.

Middleton's courtship of Charlotte Baird and his relationship with the Empress are the focus of Daisy Goodwin's novel The Fortune Hunter.

Middleton is portrayed by Colin Morgan in the 2022 historical drama film Corsage written and directed by Marie Kreutzer.
