= Glass Doll =

British-bred Thoroughbred racehorse

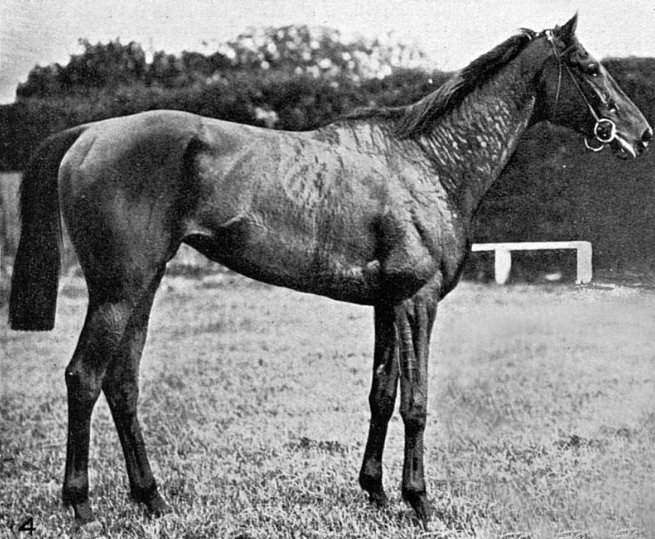
- Glass Doll in 1907.
- Sire: Isinglass
- Grandsire: Isonomy
- Dam: Fota
- Damsire: Hampton
- Sex: Mare
- Foaled: 1904
- Died: 1922 (aged 17–18)
- Country: United Kingdom
- Colour: Bay
- Breeder: Jack Barnato Joel
- Owner: Jack Barnato Joel
- Trainer: Charles Morton
- Record: 8: 2-0-4
- Earnings: £4,950 (in 1906)

Major wins
- Oaks Stakes (1906)

Glass Doll (1904–1922) was a British Thoroughbred racehorse and broodmare. She showed little ability as a two-year-old, winning one minor race from five starts. On her three-year-old debut however, she produced a strong late run to take the Epsom Oaks at odds of 25/1, much to the surprise of her owner and trainer. She never won again and was retired from racing at the end of the year. She had some influence as a broodmare through the descendants of her daughter Ocean Light.

== Background ==
Glass Doll was a bay mare bred in England by Jack Barnato Joel who also owned her during her racing career. She was trained by Joel's private trainer Charles Morton at Wantage in Berkshire. Glass Doll was a small and unprepossessing filly: the writer "Vigilant" described her as "a pony in height" with "no bone, no substance [and] no muscle".

Her sire Isinglass was an outstanding racehorse who won the Triple Crown in 1893. The best of his other progeny included Cherry Lass and the 2000 Guineas winner Louvois. Glass Doll's dam Fota produced at least seven other winners including the Great Metropolitan Handicap winner Congratulation. She was a great-granddaughter of the influential British broodmare Young Alice.

== Racing career ==
=== 1906: two-year-old season ===
Glass Doll ran five times as a two-year-old in 1906. She was placed three times but recorded her only victory in October at Nottingham Racecourse in the seven furlong Sherwood Forest Nursery Plate.

=== 1907: three-year-old season ===
On 7 of June Glass Doll made her first appearance as a three-year-old the 129th running of the Oaks over one and a half miles at Epsom Racecourse and started a 25/1 outsider in a fourteen-runner field. She was not fancied by her owner or trainer who believed that she would not stay the distance but allowed her to take her chance in what appeared to be a sub-standard field. Their view of her chances had not been improved when she was beaten in a training gallop by a very moderate colt named Golden Knight. The 1000 Guineas winner Witch Elm started 2/1 favourite ahead of Mimosa (9/2), with Maya, Lady Hasty, Altitude and Laodamia among the other fancied runner. Ridden by Herbert "Bert" Randall, Glass Doll was not among the early leaders as Lady Hasty set the pace before giving way to Laodamia in the straight. A furlong from the finish Glass Doll emerged from the pack with a "remarkable" burst of speed, caught Laomedia in the last fifty yards and won by half a length with Lady Hasty three quarters of a length away in third place. Jack Joel chose not to escort his filly to the winner's enclosure, and a stable lad led in the winner amid what was described as a "chilly silence". Glass Doll's winning time of 2:42.0 was two seconds faster than that recorded by Orby in winning the Epsom over the same course and distance two days previously.

At Royal Ascot later in June Glass Doll was dropped back in distance for the Coronation Stakes over one mile but was beaten into third place by Frugality and Laomedia. She carried a seven-pound weight penalty in the race and was not expected to win. Shortly after her Oaks win Glass Doll had been covered by the stallion Bill of Portland and then by Sundridge. She did not conceive, however and returned to the racetrack.

At Doncaster Racecourse in September Glass Doll was matched against colts in the St Leger but, despite attracting some support in the betting market, she made no impact and finished unplaced behind Wool Winder.

Glass Doll ended the season with earnings of £4,950.

== Assessment and honours ==
In their book, A Century of Champions, based on the Timeform rating system, John Randall and Tony Morris rated Glass Doll a "poor" winner of the Oaks.

== Breeding record ==
At the end of her racing career Glass Doll was retired to become a broodmare for Joel's stud. She produced at least five foals between 1910 and 1917:

- My Dolly, a bay filly, foaled in 1910, sired by Sundridge
- Dolly Varden, bay filly, 1911, by Sundridge
- Broken Doll, bay filly, 1913, by Sunder
- Dolly, brown filly, 1915, by Sunstar
- Ocean Light, brown filly, 1917, by Sunstar. Female-line ancestor of Moon Ballad, Braashee (Prix Royal-Oak) and Central Park (Italian Derby).

Glass Doll died in 1922.

== Pedigree ==
Pedigree of Glass Doll (GB), bay mare, 1904
Sire Isinglass (GB) 1890	Isonomy; 1875	Sterling	Oxford
Sire Isinglass (GB) 1890	Isonomy; 1875	Sterling	Whisper
Sire Isinglass (GB) 1890	Isonomy; 1875	Isola Bella	Stockwell
Sire Isinglass (GB) 1890	Isonomy; 1875	Isola Bella	Isoline
Sire Isinglass (GB) 1890	Dead Lock; 1878	Wenlock	Lord Clifden
Sire Isinglass (GB) 1890	Dead Lock; 1878	Wenlock	Mineral
Sire Isinglass (GB) 1890	Dead Lock; 1878	Malpractice	Chevalier d'Industrie
Sire Isinglass (GB) 1890	Dead Lock; 1878	Malpractice	The Dutchman's Daughter
Dam Fota (GB) 1889	Hampton; 1872	Lord Clifden	Newminster
Dam Fota (GB) 1889	Hampton; 1872	Lord Clifden	The Slave
Dam Fota (GB) 1889	Hampton; 1872	Lady Langden	Kettledrum
Dam Fota (GB) 1889	Hampton; 1872	Lady Langden	Haricot
Dam Fota (GB) 1889	Photinia (IRE); 1881	Uncas (GB)	Stockwell
Dam Fota (GB) 1889	Photinia (IRE); 1881	Uncas (GB)	Nightingale (IRE)
Dam Fota (GB) 1889	Photinia (IRE); 1881	Fair Alice (GB)	Cambuscan
Dam Fota (GB) 1889	Photinia (IRE); 1881	Fair Alice (GB)	Young Alice (Family: 4-k)

Glass Doll was inbred 3 × 4 to Lord Clifden, meaning that this stallion appears in both the third and fourth generations of her pedigree. She was also inbred 4 × 4 to Stockwell.
