= Ulster Queen =

Ulster Queen or the queen of Ulster, may refer to:

== People ==
- Queen of Ulster, the consort to the King of Ulster
- Queen of the United Kingdom, in modern times, whom is thus the Queen of Northern Ireland or Ulster
- Queen of Ireland, historically, when the high kingdom ruled Ulster

== Ships ==
- MV Ulster Queen (1929), a pre-WWII passenger ferry running between Belfast and Liverpool
- MV Ulster Queen (1967), a mid-20th-century car-and-passenger ferry running the Irish Sea route
- HMS Ulster Queen, a WWII British Royal Navy anti-aircraft ship

== Other uses ==
- Ulster Queen (horse), grandmother to St Louis (horse) and Louvois (horse)

== See also ==
- Earl of Ulster and Countess of Ulster
- Ulster (disambiguation)
- Queen (disambiguation)
