= Enterprise (horse) =

British-bred Thoroughbred racehorse

- Sire: Sterling
- Grandsire: Oxford
- Dam: King Tom mare
- Damsire: King Tom
- Sex: Stallion
- Foaled: 1884
- Country: United Kingdom
- Colour: Chestnut
- Breeder: Yardley Stud
- Owner: Douglas Baird
- Trainer: James Ryan
- Record: 8: 3-3-0

Major wins
- New Stakes (1886); July Stakes (1886); 2000 Guineas (1887)

Enterprise (1884 – after 1901) was a British Thoroughbred racehorse and sire. As a two-year-old in 1886 he was one of the best horses of his generation in England, winning the New Stakes and the July Stakes as well as finishing second in the Middle Park Plate and the Dewhurst Plate. In the following spring he recorded his biggest victory when winning the 2000 Guineas as the 2/1 favourite. He was one of the leading fancies for the Epsom Derby but missed the race after sustaining an injury in training. He remained in training until the end of 1888 but failed to recover his best form. He made no impact as a breeding stallion.

== Background ==
Enterprise was a chestnut horse bred at the Yardley stud near Birmingham by the Graham brothers. As a yearling he was offered for sale and bought for bought for 2,000 guineas by Douglas Baird. He was trained at Newmarket, Suffolk by James Ryan.

His sire, Sterling, was a successful racehorse who became an excellent sire whose other offspring included Isonomy, Paradox, Enthusiast and Harvester. Enterprise's dam, an unnamed mare sired by King Tom, was a full-sister to the Epsom Derby runner-up King Alfred.

== Racing career ==
=== 1886: two-year-old season ===
On 8 June Enterprise made his racecourse debut in the New Stakes at Royal Ascot. He was ridden by George Barrett and won at odds of 100/12 upsetting the hot favourite Freedom. He was expected to follow up in the Royal Plate at Windsor Racecourse but was defeated by George Chetwynd's colt Stetchworth. At Newmarket Racecourse on 6 July, the colt started 2/1 joint-favourite for the July Stakes. Ridden by Fred Archer he took the lead soon after the start and despite hanging left just inside the last quarter mile he won "easily" by four lengths from Hugo. On 13 October at Newmarket Enterprise finished second to Lord Calthorpe's colt Florentine in the Middle Park Plate, a race for which he had been regarded as a near certainty and started at odds of 1/7. In the Dewhurst Plate two weeks later over seven furlongs at the same track he started 7/2 second favourite behind Phil. After disputing the lead for most of the way he appeared to "cut it" (give up) in the final furlong and was beaten three lengths into second place by the Duke of Beaufort's filly Reve d'Or, a 20/1 outsider.

At the end of year Fred Archer reportedly said "If he hadn't had a touch of the white feather, Enterprise would be a second Ormonde".

=== 1887: three-year-old season ===
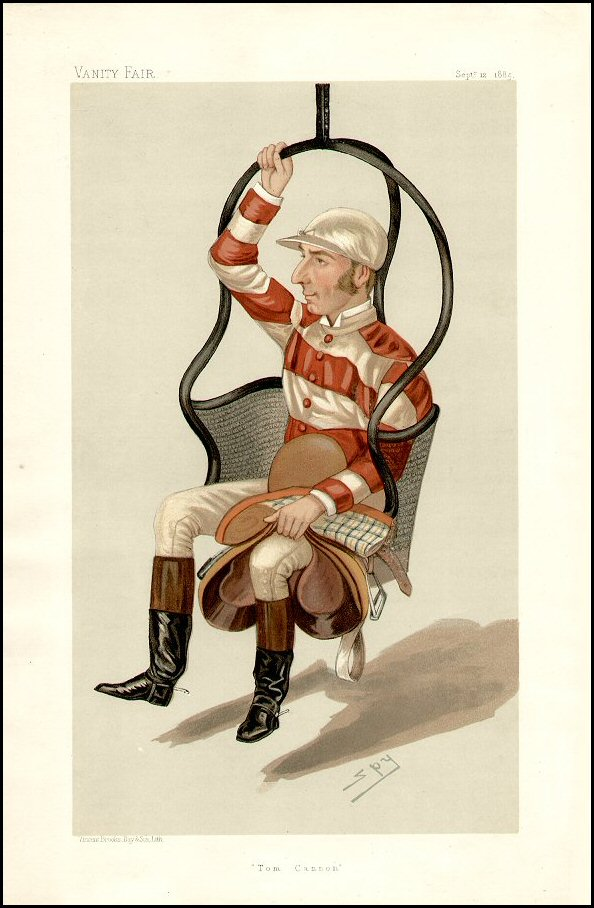
Tom Cannon, who rode Enterprise to victory in the 2000 Guineas

On 27 April 1887, Enterprise, ridden by Tom Cannon started the 2/1 favourite for the 79th running of the 200 Guineas over the Rowley Mile. Phil (10/1), Florentine (10/1) and Hugo (20/1) were again in opposition but the best fancied of his opponents were Eglamore, Grandison (Windsor Castle Stakes) and Lovegold. Enterprise started well and as the field entered the last quarter mile he moved into third place behind Eglamore and Phil, with the three colts drawing well clear of the rest. Racing in the centre of the trio, he gained the advantage inside the final furlong and won "rather easily" in "capital style" by half a length from Phil with Eglamore the same distance away in third place. Despite the close finish, Cannon always appeared to be in control of the race ensuring that Baird and his associates collected very large sums in winning bets. The winning time of 1:45.6 constituted a new record for the race.

Enterprise was strongly fancied for the Epsom Derby, being quoted at odds of 9/4 a week before the race. When engaged in training on the Limekilns gallop the colt reportedly took fright, jumped a hedge onto a road and had to be retrieved from an adjacent field. Although he "wrenched" himself, the initial prognostications were good, but he was subsequently withdrawn from the contest.

=== 1888: four-year-old season ===
On 27 July 1888 Enterprise started the 100/12 third choice in the betting for the Eclipse Stakes at Sandown Park but finished sixth behind the Duke of Westminster's colt Orbit. On 22 September the colt started a 33/1 outsider for the £11,000 Lancashire Plate over seven furlongs at Manchester Racecourse and came home unplaced behind Seabreeze.

== Stud record ==
After his retirement from racing Enterprise became a breeding stallion but had very little success as a sire of winners. He was the damsire of King James, who won the Prix d'Hédouville in 1907.

== Pedigree ==
Pedigree of Enterprise (GB), chestnut stallion, 1884
Sire Sterling (GB) 1868	Oxford; 1857	Birdcatcher	Sir Hercules
Sire Sterling (GB) 1868	Oxford; 1857	Birdcatcher	Guiccioli
Sire Sterling (GB) 1868	Oxford; 1857	Honey Dear	Plenipotentiary
Sire Sterling (GB) 1868	Oxford; 1857	Honey Dear	My Dear*
Sire Sterling (GB) 1868	Whisper; 1857	Flatcatcher	Touchstone
Sire Sterling (GB) 1868	Whisper; 1857	Flatcatcher	Decoy
Sire Sterling (GB) 1868	Whisper; 1857	Silence	Melbourne
Sire Sterling (GB) 1868	Whisper; 1857	Silence	Secret
Dam King Tom mare (GB) 1868	King Tom; 1851	Harkaway	Economist
Dam King Tom mare (GB) 1868	King Tom; 1851	Harkaway	Fanny Dawson
Dam King Tom mare (GB) 1868	King Tom; 1851	Pocahontas	Glencoe*
Dam King Tom mare (GB) 1868	King Tom; 1851	Pocahontas	Marpessa
Dam King Tom mare (GB) 1868	Bay Middleton mare 1856	Bay Middleton*	Sultan*
Dam King Tom mare (GB) 1868	Bay Middleton mare 1856	Bay Middleton*	Cobweb*
Dam King Tom mare (GB) 1868	Bay Middleton mare 1856	West Country Lass	Venison
Dam King Tom mare (GB) 1868	Bay Middleton mare 1856	West Country Lass	Margellina (Family 11-g)

* Enterprise is inbred 5S x 3D to the stallion Bay Middleton, meaning that he appears fifth generation (via My Dear) on the sire side of his pedigree, and third generation on the dam side of his pedigree.

* Enterprise is inbred 6S x 5D x 4D to the stallion Sultan, meaning that he appears sixth generation (via My Dear) on the sire side of his pedigree, and fifth generation (via Glencoe) and fourth generation on the dam side of his pedigree.
