= 1893 Epsom Derby =

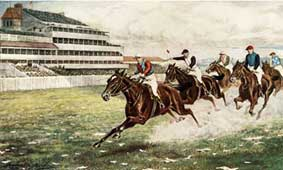
Isinglass leading the field in the closing stages of the 1893 Derby

The 1893 Epsom Derby was a horse race which took place at Epsom Downs on 31 May 1893. It was the 113th running of the Derby, and it was won by Isinglass. The winner was ridden by Tommy Loates and trained by James Jewitt.

== Race details ==
- Prize money: £6,000 (Winner received £5,000)
- Number of runners: 11
- Winner's time: 2m 43s

== Full result ==
	*	Horse	Jockey	Trainer	SP
1		Isinglass	Tommy Loates	James Jewitt	4/9 fav
2	1½	Ravensbury	H Barker	William Jarvis	25/1
3	2	Raeburn	John Watts	George Dawson	20/1
4		Peppercorn	F Rickaby	Thomas Leader	100/1
5		Quickly Wise	J Calder		100/1
6		Royal Harry	W Bradford		100/1
7		Irish Wake	Morny Cannon		100/7
8		Son of a Gun	J Calder		28/1
9		Dame President	George Barrett		20/1
10		William	F Webb		100/6
UR		Lord William	T Mullen		100/1

* The distances between the horses are shown in lengths or shorter. shd = short-head; hd = head; PU = pulled up; UR = unseated rider.

== Winner's details ==
Further details of the winner, Isinglass:

- Foaled: 1890
- Sire: Isonomy; Dam: Dead Lock (Wenlock)
- Owner: Harry McCalmont
- Breeder: Harry McCalmont
