= Jack Robinson (horse racing) =

British racehorse trainer

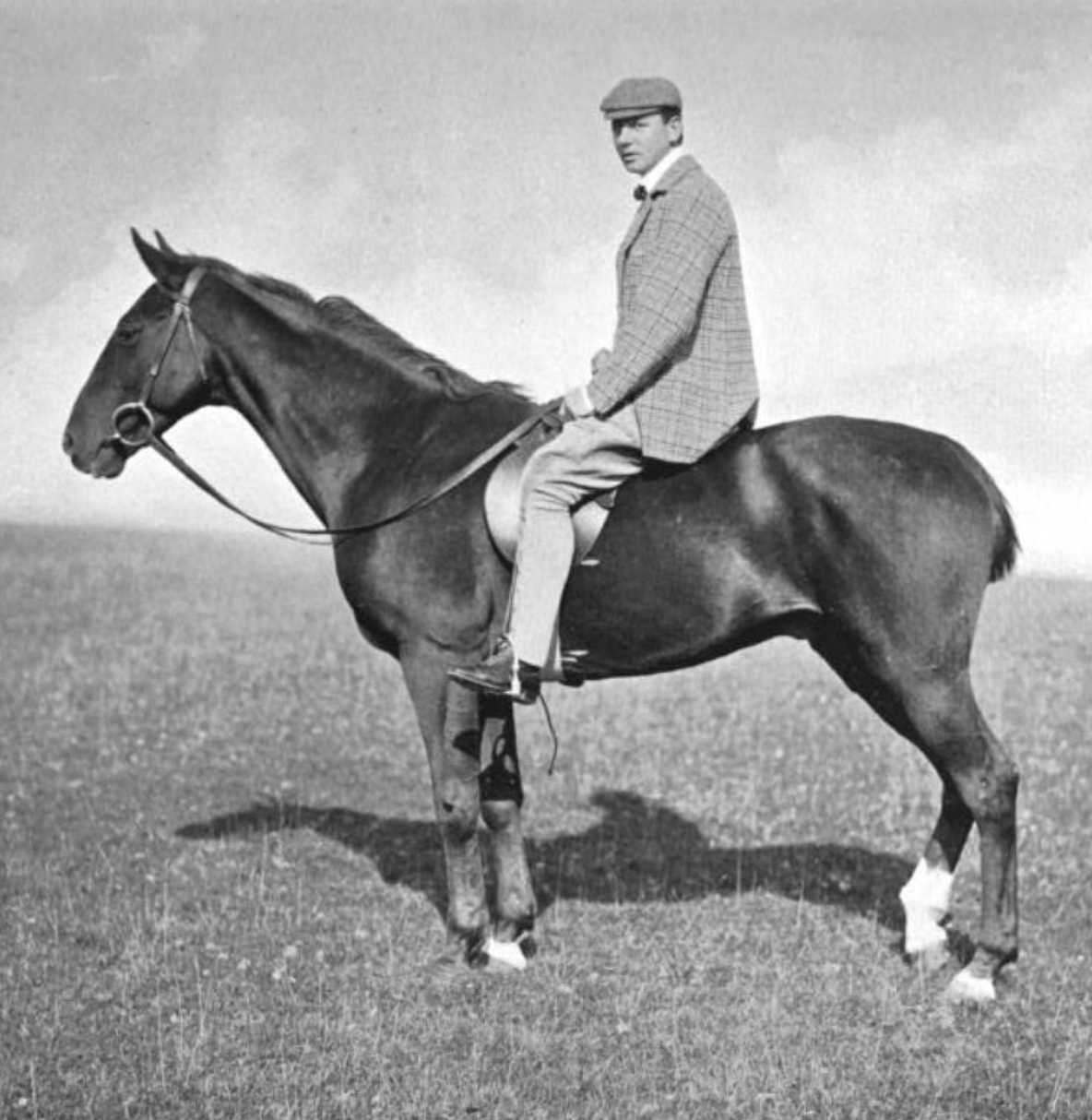
pictured 1895

William Thomas "Jack" Robinson (died 1 July 1918) was a British racehorse trainer and jockey prominent in the late 1800s and early 1900s. As a rider and trainer, Robinson was a winner of some of Britain's most notable horse races of his day, including the St Leger, the Goodwood Cup, and the 2000 Guineas.

== Background ==
Robinson was born in Kensington, London. He was first apprenticed as a jockey to the trainer Tom Cannon Snr. He rode his first winner in 1884. The last year of his apprenticeship was bought out by Captain Machell. He retired from race riding in 1892 to become a trainer. He purchased Foxhill stables and gallops in Wiltshire for his training operation.

He was Champion Trainer in 1905. That year, he won the 2000 Guineas Stakes with Vedas in a time of 1:41.2. Vedas was ridden by Herbert Jones and owned by West de Wend-Fenton.

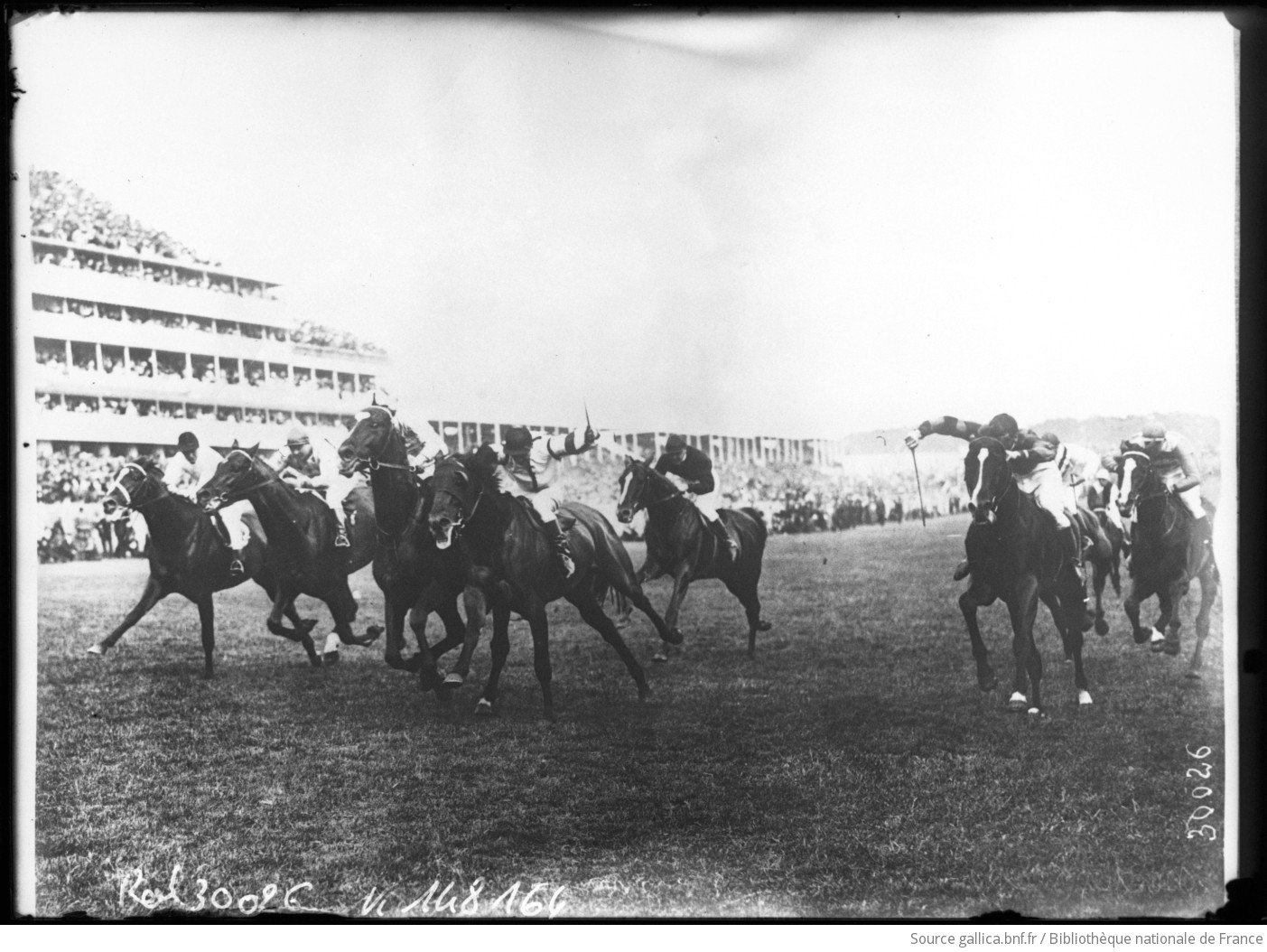
The 134th Epsom Derby field. Left to right: Nimbus, Great Sport, Craganour (trained by Robinson), Aboyeur, Sun Yat, Louvois, Shogun

In 1913, Robinson became known for his involvement in the "Craganour affair", in which a horse trained by him was denied winning the 2000 Guineas and the 1913 Epsom Derby (also known as the "Suffragette Derby") due to the unpopularity of the horse's owner, Charles Bower Ismay. Several theories for the horse's disqualification exist, accounting for Ismay's family ownership of White Star Line and responsibility for the Titanic disaster, or for a personal affair between Ismay and the daughter in law of the race's steward. It was said that the aftermath of the Craganour affair broke Robinson, and he died five years later on 1 July 1918.

== Notable horses ==
- Seabreeze, jockey, won 1888 Oaks Stakes
- Kilwarlin, jockey, won 112th running of the St Leger
- Bonavista, jockey, 1892 2000 Guineas
- Merman, trainer, won 1899 Goodwood Cup
- Vedas, trainer
- Night Hawk, trainer
- Craganour, trainer, who passed the post first at both the 1913 2000 Guineas and the 1913 Epsom Derby, but was controversially denied victory both times
- Witch Elm, trainer
