= Enthusiast (horse) =

British-bred Thoroughbred racehorse

- Sire: Sterling
- Grandsire: Oxford
- Dam: Cherry Duchess
- Damsire: The Duke
- Sex: Stallion
- Foaled: 1886
- Country: United Kingdom
- Colour: Chestnut
- Breeder: Yardley Stud
- Owner: Douglas Baird
- Trainer: James Ryan
- Record: 13: 2-2-1

Major wins
- 2000 Guineas (1889); Sussex Stakes (1889)

Enthusiast (1886 – 23 October 1909) was a British Thoroughbred racehorse and sire best known for his upset victory over Donovan in the 2000 Guineas. As a two-year-old he failed to win a race but showed considerable promise when finishing second in the Dewhurst Plate. He was still a maiden when he won the Guineas which proved to be his only victory over Donovan in eight meetings. He went on to win the Sussex Stakes as well as finishing third in the Prince of Wales's Stakes and fourth in the St Leger. After his retirement from racing he had some success as a breeding stallion.

== Background ==
Enthusiast was a "very handsome" chestnut horse bred at the Yardley stud near Birmingham by the Graham brothers. As a yearling he was offered for sale and bought for 2,000 guineas by Douglas Baird. He was trained at Newmarket, Suffolk by James Ryan.

His sire, Sterling, was a racehorse who became a sire whose other offspring included Isonomy, Paradox, Enterprise and Harvester. Enthusiast's dam Cherry Duchess produced several other good winners including the July Cup winner Energy and was the female-line ancestor of Alsab.

== Racing career ==
=== 1888: two-year-old season ===
On 10 October Enthusiast made his debut in the Middle Park Plate over six furlongs at Newmarket Racecourse and finished eighth of the fourteen runners behind Donovan. At the next Newmarket meeting two weeks later the colt finished second to Royal Star in the Criterion Stakes and then started at odds of 8/1 for the Dewhurst Plate over seven furlongs. Ridden by Tom Cannon he led for most of the way before being overtaken a furlong out and beaten half a length by Donovan.

=== 1889: three-year-old season ===
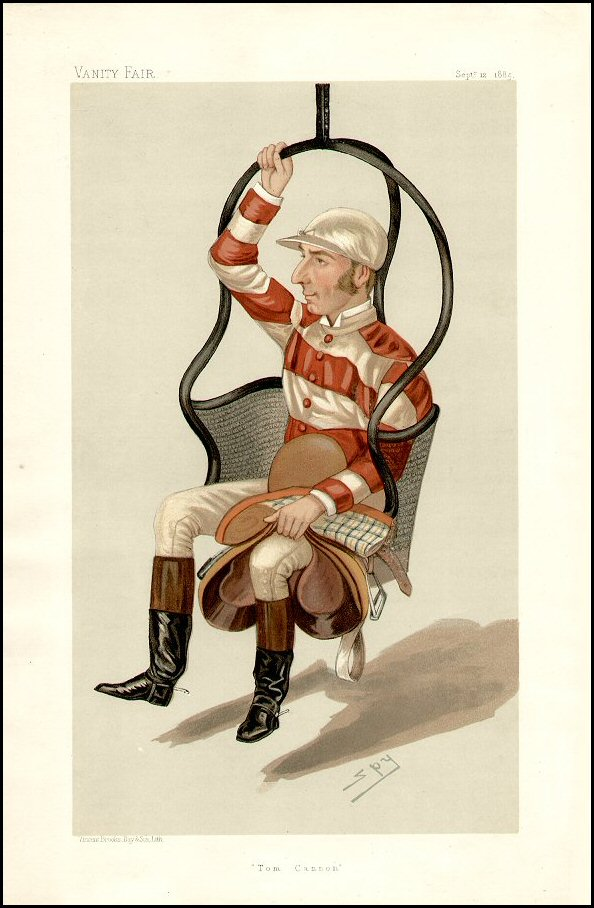
Tom Cannon, who rode Enthusiast to victory in the 2000 Guineas

On his three-year-old debut, Enthusiast finished fourth behind Donovan, Mr Abingdon's Pioneer and Minthe in the £12,000 Prince of Wales's Stakes at Leicester on 6 April. On 1 May 1889, with Tom Cannon in the saddle, Enthusiast was one of nine colts to contest the 81st running of the 2000 Guineas over the Rowley Mile at Newmarket and started the 25/1 fourth choice in the betting. Donovan appeared to be a near certainty for the race and started at odds of 20/85 (1/4.25) whilst Pioneer and Prince Solykoff's Gold were the only other horses to start at less than 100/1. Enthusiast started slowly and then settled behind the leaders before producing a strong run down the centre of the track approaching the last quarter mile. By this point Donovan had gone to the front from Pioneer but Enthusiast maintained his progress and headed the favourite inside the final furlong. Donovan rallied in the final strides but Enthusiast held on to win by a head with Pioneer three quarters of a length back in third. The closing stages of the contest provoked the "wildest excitement" which was followed by an "awful moment of breathless silence" before the judge announced the result.

Enthusiast was moved up in distance for the Newmarket Stakes over ten furlongs on 21 May in which started the 100/30 second favourite in a seventeen-runner field. He reportedly "cracked" two furlongs out and finished unplaced behind Donovan who won "very easily". In the Epsom Derby on 5 June Cannon opted to partner Baird's more-fancied runner El Dorado leaving Calder to take the mount on Enthusiast. Starting a 33/1 outsider he ran well early on and turned into the straight in second place but then dropped from contention and came home eighth of the thirteen runners behind Donovan. At Royal Ascot he faced Donovan yet again in the Prince of Wales's Stakes over thirteen furlongs and finished third to his old rival, with second place going to Royal Star. He returned to winning form at Goodwood Racecourse when he won the Sussex Stakes at odds of 6/4, ridden by Billy Warne.

On 11 September Enthusiast, with Cannon in the saddle, started 100/6 third choice in the betting behind Donovan and the highly regarded Northern colt Chittabob for the St Leger over 14 1/2 furlongs at Doncaster Racecourse. The Derby winner completely dominated the race and although Cannon "did all he could", Enthusiast came home fourth behind Donovan, Miguel and Davenport. Ten days later the colt was dropped back in distance for the £12,000 Lancashire Plate over seven furlongs at Manchester Racecourse and finished outside the first five as Donovan won again. On the last of his races that year he came home last of the four runners behind Gold, Antipas and Ayrshire in the Champion Stakes over ten furlongs at Newmarket in October.

=== 1890: four-year-old season ===
Enthusiast remained in training as a four-year-old in 1890. In the Ascot Gold Cup over 2 1/2 miles on 19 June he briefly took the lead in the straight but was overtaken in the closing stages and finished fourth of the five runners behind Gold.

== Stud record ==
At the end of his racing career Enthusiast was retired to become a breeding stallion. He was not a great success at stud but did produce several good winners including Eager (July Cup, Wokingham Stakes, Portland Handicap), Energetic (Sussex Stakes) and Lord Edward (National Breeders' Produce Stakes). Enthusiast died on 23 October 1909.

== Sire line tree ==
- Enthusiast
  - Eager
    - Eastern
    - Prince Olaf
      - Percy
        - Renomme
        - Valcik
      - Plato
      - Lantorna
    - Prince Rupert
    - Rangag
      - Irish Prince
    - Meleager
      - Portmore
      - Duende
        - Arriba
    - Jaeger
    - Percival Keene
    - Sir Eager
      - Lord Of Burghley
      - Compiler
      - Drake
        - Mutable
  - Succoth
    - Don Sancho
  - Lord Edward
  - Energetic
  - Glenapp
    - Fiery Cross
  - Bealderg
    - Halston
  - Meldhre
  - Lochryan
    - Lough Foyle
  - Roseate Dawn
  - Arranmore
    - Lowenherz
    - Rheinwein
      - Impet
      - Kares

== Pedigree ==
Pedigree of Enthusiast (GB), chestnut stallion, 1886
Sire Sterling (GB) 1868	Oxford; 1857	Birdcatcher*	Sir Hercules*
Sire Sterling (GB) 1868	Oxford; 1857	Birdcatcher*	Guiccioli*
Sire Sterling (GB) 1868	Oxford; 1857	Honey Dear	Plenipotentiary
Sire Sterling (GB) 1868	Oxford; 1857	Honey Dear	My Dear
Sire Sterling (GB) 1868	Whisper; 1857	Flatcatcher	Touchstone*
Sire Sterling (GB) 1868	Whisper; 1857	Flatcatcher	Decoy
Sire Sterling (GB) 1868	Whisper; 1857	Silence	Melbourne*
Sire Sterling (GB) 1868	Whisper; 1857	Silence	Secret
Dam Cherry Duchess (GB) 1871	The Duke; 1862	Stockwell	The Baron*
Dam Cherry Duchess (GB) 1871	The Duke; 1862	Stockwell	Pocahontas
Dam Cherry Duchess (GB) 1871	The Duke; 1862	Bay Celia	Orlando*
Dam Cherry Duchess (GB) 1871	The Duke; 1862	Bay Celia	Hersey
Dam Cherry Duchess (GB) 1871	Mirella; 1863	Gemma di Vergy	Sir Hercules*
Dam Cherry Duchess (GB) 1871	Mirella; 1863	Gemma di Vergy	Snowdrop
Dam Cherry Duchess (GB) 1871	Mirella; 1863	Lady Roden	West Australian*
Dam Cherry Duchess (GB) 1871	Mirella; 1863	Lady Roden	Ennui (Family 27-a)

* Enthusiast is inbred 3S x 5D to the stallion Birdcatcher, meaning that he appears third generation on the sire side of his pedigree, and fifth generation (via The Baron) on the dam side of his pedigree.

* Enthusiast is inbred 4S x 4D to the stallion Sir Hercules, meaning that he appears fourth generation on the sire side of his pedigree, and fourth generation on the dam side of his pedigree.

* Enthusiast is inbred 4S x 5D to the stallion Touchstone, meaning that he appears fourth generation on the sire side of his pedigree, and fifth generation (via Orlando) on the dam side of his pedigree.

* Enthusiast is inbred 4S x 5D to the stallion Melbourne, meaning that he appears fourth generation on the sire side of his pedigree, and fifth generation (via West Australian) on the dam side of his pedigree.
