= Isinglass (horse) =

British-bred Thoroughbred racehorse

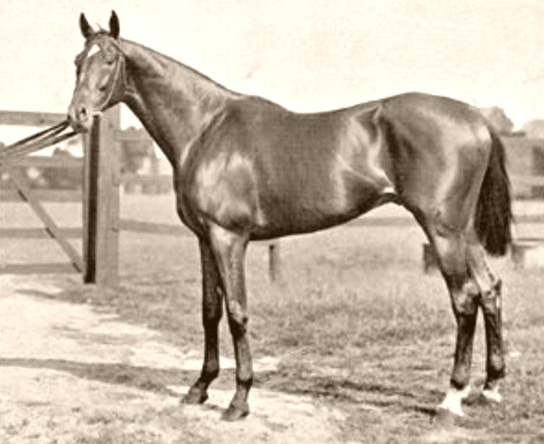
- Isinglass in training
- Sire: Isonomy
- Grandsire: Sterling
- Dam: Dead Lock
- Damsire: Wenlock
- Sex: Stallion
- Foaled: 24 March 1890
- Country: United Kingdom of Great Britain and Ireland
- Colour: Bay
- Breeder: Harry McCalmont
- Owner: Harry McCalmont
- Trainer: James Jewitt
- Record: 12: 11–1–0
- Earnings: £58,655

Major wins
- New Stakes (1892); Middle Park Plate (1892); 2000 Guineas (1893); Newmarket Stakes (1893); Epsom Derby (1893); St. Leger Stakes (1893); Princess of Wales's Stakes (1894); Eclipse Stakes (1894); Jockey Club Stakes (1894); Ascot Gold Cup (1895)

Awards
- 6th U.K. Triple Crown Champion (1893); Leading broodmare sire in Britain & Ireland (1912)
- Last updated on 5 December 2009

Isinglass (1890–1911) was a British Thoroughbred racehorse and sire. In a career which lasted from 1892 until 1895 he ran twelve times and won eleven races. He was the best British two-year-old of 1892 and went on to become sixth winner of the English Triple Crown by winning the 2000 Guineas at Newmarket, The Derby and the St. Leger Stakes at Doncaster in the following year. He was undefeated in his last two seasons, setting a world record for prize money and gaining recognition from contemporary experts as one of the best horses seen in England up to that time.

== Background ==
Isinglass was a powerfully built bay horse standing 16 hands high, bred by his owner Harry McCalmont. He was sired by the double Ascot Gold Cup winner Isonomy out of a mare named Deadlock. Deadlock had a varied career, having been once sold for £20 and working as a carriage-horse before being bought by McCalmont.

Isinglass was trained at the stable of James Jewitt, who had previously trained the winner of the 1876 Grand National Steeplechase. Jewett handled the day-to-day conditioning of the horse while his racing campaign and strategy was mapped out by McCalmont's racing manager, James Octavius Machell who was described as "one of the most astute racing men to be found either in England or out of it". The horse was ridden in most of his races by Tommy Loates.

== Racing record ==
=== 1892: two-year-old season ===
Before Isinglass ever raced, McCalmont had great belief in his abilities, and wagered £100 on him to win the 1893 Derby at odds of 50/1. Isinglass was undefeated in three races as two-year-old in 1892, beginning with a maiden race at Newmarket in spring. At Royal Ascot on 16 June he ran in the five furlong New Stakes, the race now known as the Norfolk Stakes, in which he was ridden by George Chaloner. Starting at odds of 100/30 he took an early lead and was never seriously challenged, winning easily by two lengths from Fealar, Ravensbury and seven others.

On 13 October he ran in what was considered the best race of the season for two-year-olds, the Middle Park Plate at Newmarket for which he started at odds of 10/1. The race did not go well for Isinglass as he started slowly and then struggled to find a clear run in the closing stages. Once Chaloner pulled him to the outside however, he quickened well and won by one and a half lengths from Ravensbury, Le Nicham and Raeburn. The win established Isinglass as one of the best juveniles of the season and he disputed favouritism for the following years Classics with the similarly undefeated Meddler, the winner of the Dewhurst Stakes.

=== 1893: three-year-old season ===
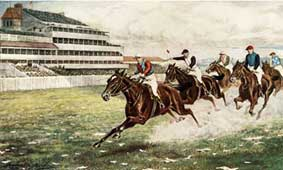
Isinglass leading the field in the closing stages of the 1893 Derby

By February 17 Isinglass was clear favourite for both the 2000 Guineas (7/2) and the Derby (9/2), although his odds lengthened slightly after a stable accident interrupted his training. A major obstacle to his success was removed when Meddler's owner, George "Abingdon" Baird, died in early 1893, thus canceling his colt's classic entries. The spring of that year was unusually dry, and Jewitt had problems preparing Isinglass on the prevailing hard ground. Instead of galloping the colt in the usual way, which would have risked injury, Jewitt and Machell brought him to fitness with a series of canters up and down Bury Hill. In the 2000 Guineas on 3 May Isinglass started at odds of 4/5 in a field of ten colts. He started well and was second in the early stages behind the pacemaker St. Jude, before taking the lead at half way. He was challenged by Ravensbury in the closing stages and the two colts pulled clear of the field, with Isinglass maintaining his advantage to win by three quarters of a length with Raeburn a further four lengths away in third. The winning time of 1:42.4 was a new record for the race. Two weeks later Isinglass was moved up to ten furlongs for the Newmarket Stakes. Starting the 1/4 favourite he took the lead at half way and steadily increased his lead in the closing stages to win easily by three lengths from Phocion and Ravensbury.

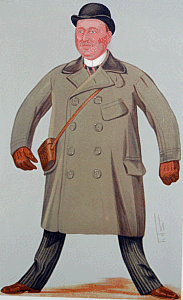
Isinglass's owner, Colonel Harry McCalmont by Leslie Ward

At Epsom on 31 May Isinglass was sent off the 4/9 favourite for the Derby against ten opponents and was the unanimous choice of the twenty-four leading newspaper experts. He started slowly and was towards the rear of the field in the early stages as the runners were led by the outsider Lord William. He made steady progress to join the leaders just after half way and was sent through a gap along the rails to take a slight lead over Raeburn on the turn into the straight. Two furlongs from the finish Isinglass swerved to the right and appeared to be struggling, allowing Raeburn to take the advantage and forcing Loates to use his whip and spurs on the favourite. Isinglass responded immediately, pulled ahead of Raeburn, and held off the late challenge of Ravensbury to win by one and a half lengths. The first three horses from the 2000 Guineas filled the first three places in the Derby. Loates explained that the moment of concern early in the straight had been caused by Isinglass shying when he heard the roar of the huge crowd, and described him as running "as green as a two-year-old".

On 6 September Isinglass attempted to win the Triple Crown in the St Leger at Doncaster. He started at odds of 40/75 in a field of seven. Loates restrained the favourite in the early stages before making his challenge in the straight and after going clear of the opposition he was eased down in the closing stages to win by one and a half lengths. Ravensbury was the runner-up yet again, becoming the first of only two horses to finish second in all three legs of the Triple Crown. Isinglass's win took his winnings for the year to £18,860 and to £23,437 for his career. Two weeks later he ran in the £8,000 Lancashire Plate at over one mile at Manchester Racecourse, in which he was opposed by the filly La Fleche, the winner of the 1892 Fillies' Triple Crown. Isinglass led the field from the start and defeated the filly by half a length but lost his unbeaten record as he was beaten by Raeburn (carrying ten pounds less than the Derby winner), who produced a strong late run to win by a length. Some press reports suggested that Loates on Isinglass and George Barrett on La Fleche had been so intent on beating each other that they ignored Raeburn, while other commentators felt that Isinglass had been unsuited by having to make the running.

=== 1894: four-year-old season ===
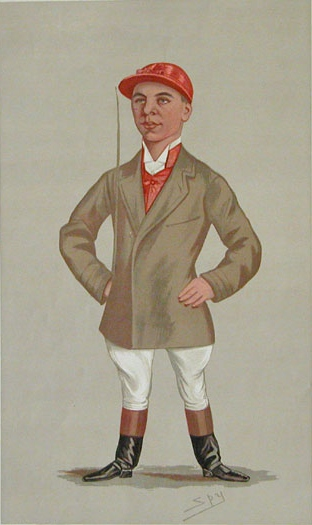
Tommy Loates, Isinglass's regular jockey

Isinglass stayed in training in 1894, but during the first half of the season the racing public's attention was drawn away from him by the achievements of Ladas. Lord Rosebery's three-year-old colt won the 2000 Guineas and the Derby, maintaining an unbeaten record in his first eight races. Isinglass, by contrast, had a series of training problems forcing him to miss an intended run in the Hardwicke Stakes at Royal Ascot.

Isinglass returned for a meeting with Ladas in the inaugural running of the £10,000 Princess of Wales's Stakes over one mile at Newmarket. The race attracted a large crowd including the Prince of Wales (who supported Isinglass) and the Queen's cousin George, Duke of Cambridge (who favoured Ladas). The field also included Raeburn, Ravensbury (who had won impressively at Royal Ascot), and an improving three-year-old named Bullingdon. The early pace was slow, and Loates restrained Isinglass behind the leaders before moving up to challenge Ladas for the lead a furlong out. He accounted for the Derby winner in a matter of strides but was immediately challenged by Bullingdon. In a closely contested finish Isinglass prevailed by a short head from Bullingdon with Ladas finishing a well-beaten third. In the £10,000 Eclipse Stakes at Sandown on 20 July, Isinglass met Ladas again, this time over ten furlongs on soft ground. Isinglass started favourite at 4/5 with Ladas on 13/8 and the other runners, who included Raeburn, Ravensbury and the filly Throstle virtually ignored. Isinglass raced in second behind his stable companion Priestholme who set off at an exceptionally fast pace. Priestholme dropped away in the straight, leaving Isinglass in the lead and Ladas moving up to challenge. The two Derby winners dominated the race in the closing stages but in spite of a "game pursuit" by Ladas, who got to within a neck of his rival at one point, Isinglass proved his superiority and won by a length with the rest of the field, headed by Throstle, well beaten.

Having won two of the "Ten Thousand Pounders", Isinglass attempted to win a third in the Jockey Club Stakes over one and a quarter miles at Newmarket on 28 September. The early stages of the race were marked by the erratic behaviour of the St Leger winner Throstle who bolted off the course despite the best efforts of her rider Mornington Cannon and embarked on "a tour of the country". Priestholme again made the early running before Isinglass took the lead two furlongs from the finish and went clear. Although he was eased down in the closing stages he won decisively by two lengths from the French colt Gouvernail. The win took Isinglass's lifetime winnings up to £54,934, less than £300 behind the record held by Donovan.

By the end of 1894, Isinglass was being described as "one of the greatest race-horses that has trod the English turf". A measure of his superiority came when the weights for the Cesarewitch Handicap were published: he was assigned 146 pounds for the race, making him officially seventeen pounds ahead of La Fleche.

=== 1895: five-year-old season ===
Isinglass was kept in training with the two and a half mile Ascot Gold Cup as his only target. McCalmont turned down a challenge from Lord Rosebery for a match race between Isinglass and Ladas in spring as he did not wish to disrupt his horse's preparation for the race. At Royal Ascot on 20 June when he started at odds of 2/11 for the Gold Cup against two opponents. He raced lazily in the early stages as Kilsallaghan made the running in a slowly run race. He had to be "woke up" by Loates when the race began in earnest six furlongs from the finish and moved up to take the lead entering the straight. After being briefly challenged by Reminder, he went clear and won "at his leisure" by three lengths from Reminder, with Kilsallaghan third.

Immediately following his Ascot win, Isinglass was retired to stud after a career which had seen him win races at distances from 5/8 of a mile to as much as 2 1/2 miles. Isinglass's earnings of £58,655 set a world record that stood until it was surpassed by Zev in 1923. His British record stood for fifty-seven years until it was broken by Tulyar in 1952.

== Stud record ==
Sent to Cheveley Park Stud near Newmarket for breeding duty, Isinglass sired three British Classic Race winners: Cherry Lass, Glass Doll, and Louvois. His most successful son as a sire was Star Shoot who was leading sire in North America on five occasions, siring horses such as Sir Barton and Grey Lag. Isinglass also was very successful as a sire of broodmares, notably as the damsire of Prince Palatine. In 1912, he was posthumously the leading broodmare sire in Great Britain and Ireland.

Foaled	Name	Sex	Major Wins/Achievements
1898	Star Shoot	Stallion	Leading sire in North America, Leading broodmare sire in North America
1901	John O'Gaunt	Stallion	Most influential son, including two direct sire descended U.S. Triple Crown winners Whirlaway and Assault
1902	Cherry Lass	Mare	1000 Guineas Stakes, Epsom Oaks
1904	Glass Doll	Mare	Epsom Oaks
1910	Louvois	Stallion	2000 Guineas Stakes

Isinglass died at Cheveley Park Stud on 5 December 1911. His skeleton is at the Natural History Museum in London.

== Sire line tree ==
Descendants of Isinglass (click to show)
- Isinglass
  - Gallerte
  - Jacobite
  - Star Shoot
    - Beacon Light
    - Kentucky Beau
    - Uncle
      - Old Rosebud
      - Step Along
    - Great Heavens
    - Captain Ross
    - Colinet
    - Any Port
    - Bourbon Beau
    - Star Charter
    - Eyebrow
    - Magneto
    - Helios
    - Solar Star
    - Ivory Black
    - Star Master
      - Kildare
      - McCarthy
    - Stargazer
    - Audacious
      - Storm
      - Foolhardy
    - Sir Barton
    - Star Hampton
    - Georgie
    - Grey Lag
    - Hildur
      - Main Man
    - Arendal
  - Veles
    - Vexillum
  - Rising Glass
  - Azamat
  - Kilglass
  - Agar
  - Challenger
    - Gillamatong
  - John O'Gaunt
    - Cardinal Beaufort
    - Swynford
      - Hainault
        - Haine
        - Simeons Fort
        - Yeomanstown
      - Under Fire
        - Bagenbaggage
      - March Along
        - Lightning March
        - Safari
      - Gauntley
      - Sirrah
      - Westward Ho
        - Norwest
      - Blandford
        - Athford
        - Buland
        - Buland Bala
        - Trigo
        - Blenheim (1927)
        - Blue Skies
        - Filarete
        - Golden Grace
        - Blenheim (1928)
        - Unlikely
        - Bulandshar
        - Electron
        - Royal Dancer
        - Harinero
        - Madagascar
        - Statesman
        - Badruddin
        - Bahrein
        - Blanding
        - Blazonry
        - Brantome
        - Primero
        - Solicitor General
        - Starford
        - Stormy Weather
        - Sunderland
        - Umidwar
        - Windsor Lad
        - Bahram
        - Bokbul
        - Chivalry
        - Conspirator
        - Desert Cloud
        - Duke John
        - Hindoo Holiday
        - Lord Paramount
        - North Wales
        - Puits D'Amour
        - September Errand
        - Baber Shah
        - Baffles
        - Bala Hissar
        - Blandonian
        - Broifort
        - His Grace
        - Isolater
        - Malplaquet
        - Midstream
        - Ninth Duke
        - Rookwood
        - Blunderbuss
        - Boro Boudour
        - Dragonnade
        - Berwick
        - Blandstar
        - Grano
        - Holywell
        - Old Radnor
        - Pasch
        - Pound Foolish
        - Rajah
        - Diadoque
        - Pigling Bland
      - Silurian
        - Santiago
        - Signum
        - Silfo
        - Similor
        - Sargazo
        - Siete Colores
      - Stratford
        - Charger
        - Seraph Boy
        - Diplomat
      - Bold And Bad
      - Top Gallant
      - Gallardo
      - Sansovino
        - Jacopo
        - Sandwich
        - Sans Crainte
        - Portofino
        - Sans Peine
        - Buckleigh
        - Sansofine
        - Shahali
        - Black Domino
        - Monument
        - St Magnus
        - Snowfall
        - Faroe
      - St Germans
        - St Brideaux
        - Twenty Grand
        - Jungle King
        - The Darb
        - Carry Over
        - Rose Cross
        - Bold Venture
        - Bim Bam
        - The Rhymer
        - Devil Diver
      - Frilford
        - Frill Prince
      - Lulli
      - Schiavoni
      - Verbius
        - Fersen
      - Barbican
      - Lancegaye
        - Cavalcade
        - Punch
        - War Lance
      - Swift And Sure
        - Eastport
        - Sir Marlboro
      - Swinburne
        - Swinfield
      - Birthright
        - Heirdom
      - Bolingbroke
        - Patriot King
        - The Old Pretender
        - Bimco
        - Rondo
      - Strathlaven
      - Hartford
      - Lyme Regis
      - Pick Of The Circus
      - Royal Ford
        - Heelfly
      - Challenger
        - Challedon
        - Pictor
        - Vincentive
        - Challenge Me
        - Errard
        - Escadru
      - Iliad
        - Greek Shepherd
        - Homer
        - Plato
    - Sobieski
    - Lancaster
    - Harry Of Hereford
      - Harrier
        - Szeryf
      - Chateaufort
    - Cressingham
    - Duke Humphrey
      - Prince Humphrey
    - Kennymore
      - Kersasos
    - Thurnham
    - Burne Jones
      - Cercingoli
      - Delfino
      - Black Watch
        - Black Speck
    - Duke Of Lancaster
    - Black Gauntlet
    - Spithead
  - Pam
    - Hare Hill
    - Sir Tredennes
  - Prince George
  - The Scribe
    - Lempriere
  - Atlas
  - Decanter
  - Pure Crystal
  - Admiral Crichton
  - Glasconbury
  - Wombwell
  - Baltinglass
  - Pure Gem
    - Parazit
  - Carpathian
    - Tarzan
    - Morgan
  - Ednam
  - Louviers
    - Landgraf
      - Hausfreund
      - Coran
      - Ferro
        - Athanasius
          - Meertaucher
            - Mamertus
          - Orator
            - Liebesorkan
            - Mio
            - Usurpator
            - Konig Ottokar
              - White River
            - Utrillo
              - Gluck
              - Sinclair
              - Lord Udo
                - Solo
            - Hiob
            - Thiudar
            - Uomo
            - Westorkan
            - Lions
          - Ticino
            - Niederlander
              - Salto
              - Sasso
              - Baba
                - Versuch
              - Golo
              - Samariter
            - Almeido
              - Fant
            - Burgeff
            - Grande
              - Fahnentrager
                - Wildschuetz
                  - Fallada
                  - Turmalin
                  - Rienzi
                - Zigeunersohn
                  - Girlitz
                  - Zeleznik
                - Anflug
            - Neckar
              - Grind
              - Vierzhnender
              - Waidmann
                - Tajo
                  - Ziethen
                - Marullus
              - Spielhahn
              - Waidmannsdank
              - Kronzeuge
                - Schabernack
                - Arratos
                - Schiroko
                - First Lord
                - Augustinus
                - Nicandro
              - Vollkorn
                - Volturno
              - Wilderer
              - Zank
                - Garzer
              - Waidwerk
                - Aksept
                - Gazellus
              - Hogarth
                - Start
                - Maffei
              - Basalt
              - Senator
              - Blue Chip
              - Nobillis
                - Pascha
              - Tannenberg
            - Julius Caesar
            - Prodomo
              - Amboss
                - Andrang
                - Gimont
            - Nektar
              - Neckman
            - Nizam
              - Sudan
            - Ataturk
              - Mercurius
            - Nostradamus
              - Nem Igaz
              - Nemo Kapitany
              - Nimbusz
              - Notas Kapitany
              - Norbert
                - Taran
                - Valat
                - Dynamit
              - Nagyvezer
            - Steinadler
              - Mandant
                - Grottensee
              - Ashkhabad
              - Aktash
            - Andalusier
              - Soames
                - Topline
            - Mogul
            - Nisos
              - Scotland
            - Orsini
              - Nachtflug
              - Ilix
              - Cortez
                - Birthday Love
                - Stornello
              - Elviro
                - Donat
              - Don Giovanni
              - Ovid
              - Epicur
                - Revirado
                - Rockero
                - Tawil
                - Trazo
              - Golfstrom
              - Rubens
              - Flotow
              - Marduk
            - Oregon
          - Juanito
          - Cartesius
        - Abendfrieden
          - Aufbruch
          - Glueckspliz
          - Gamsjager
          - Glockenton
          - Panos
          - Geweihter
          - Waldspecht
          - Pick As
          - Giovanni
          - Feuerball
          - Perser
          - Granit
          - Pfalzteufel
          - Erdball
        - Sickingen
          - Peary
        - Anblick
          - Aldato
            - Albrant
        - Grunspecht
        - Adlerflug
      - Oberwinter
      - Pelopidas
  - Marble Arch
    - Mullingar
    - Uncle Ned
  - Eye Glass
  - Moenus
  - Louvois
    - Parisian Diamond
    - Scapin
    - St Louis
      - Control
    - French Briar
    - Loufoque
    - Warminster

== Pedigree ==
Pedigree of Isinglass (GB), bay stallion, 1890
Sire Isonomy b. 1875	Sterling b. 1868	Oxford ch. 1857	Birdcatcher*
Sire Isonomy b. 1875	Sterling b. 1868	Oxford ch. 1857	Honey Dear
Sire Isonomy b. 1875	Sterling b. 1868	Whisper b. 1857	Flatcatcher
Sire Isonomy b. 1875	Sterling b. 1868	Whisper b. 1857	Silence
Sire Isonomy b. 1875	Isola Bella ch. 1868	Stockwell ch. 1849	The Baron*
Sire Isonomy b. 1875	Isola Bella ch. 1868	Stockwell ch. 1849	Pocahontas*
Sire Isonomy b. 1875	Isola Bella ch. 1868	Isoline ch. 1860	Ethelbert
Sire Isonomy b. 1875	Isola Bella ch. 1868	Isoline ch. 1860	Bassishaw
Dam Dead-lock ch. 1878	Wenlock b. 1869	Lord Clifden b. 1860	Newminster
Dam Dead-lock ch. 1878	Wenlock b. 1869	Lord Clifden b. 1860	The Slave
Dam Dead-lock ch. 1878	Wenlock b. 1869	Mineral ch. 1863	Rataplan*
Dam Dead-lock ch. 1878	Wenlock b. 1869	Mineral ch. 1863	Manganese
Dam Dead-lock ch. 1878	Malpractice ch. 1864	Chevalier d'Industrie b. 1854	Orlando
Dam Dead-lock ch. 1878	Malpractice ch. 1864	Chevalier d'Industrie b. 1854	Industry
Dam Dead-lock ch. 1878	Malpractice ch. 1864	The Dutchman's Daughter b. 1854	The Flying Dutchman
Dam Dead-lock ch. 1878	Malpractice ch. 1864	The Dutchman's Daughter b. 1854	Red Rose (Family:3-m)

* Isinglass is inbred 4S x 5S x 6D to the stallion Birdcatcher, meaning that he appears fourth generation and fifth generation (via The Baron) on the sire side of his pedigree, and sixth generation (via Rataplan) on the dam side of his pedigree.

* Isinglass is inbred 4S x 5D to the stallion The Baron, meaning that he appears fourth generation on the sire side of his pedigree, and fifth generation (via Rataplan) on the dam side of his pedigree.

* Isinglass is inbred 4S x 5D to the mare Pocahontas, meaning that she appears fourth generation on the sire side of his pedigree, and fifth generation (via Rataplan) on the dam side of his pedigree.

== See also ==
- List of leading Thoroughbred racehorses
- List of racehorses
