= Wildfowler (horse) =

Irish-bred Thoroughbred racehorse

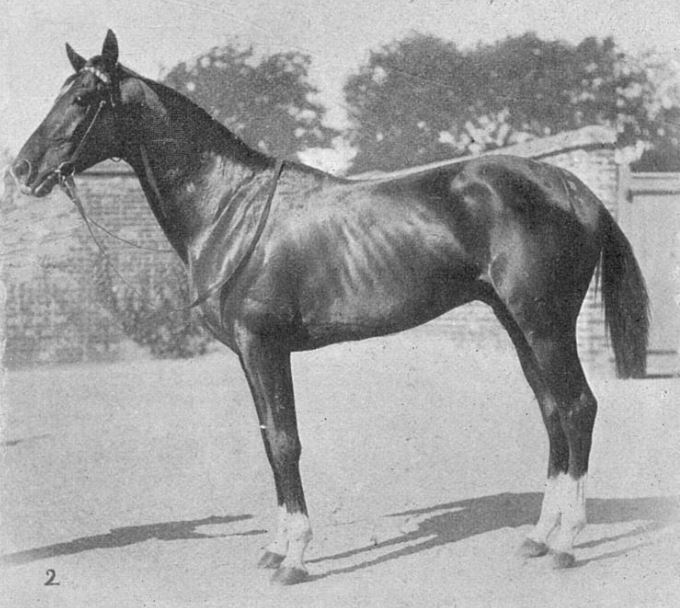
- Wildfowler in 1898.
- Sire: Gallinule
- Grandsire: Isonomy
- Dam: Tragedy
- Damsire: Ben Battle
- Sex: Stallion
- Foaled: 1895
- Country: United Kingdom of Great Britain and Ireland
- Colour: Chestnut
- Breeder: Henry Greer
- Owner: Henry Greer
- Trainer: Sam Darling
- Record: 8: 4-1-3
- Earnings: £6,745

Major wins
- St Leger (1898)

Wildfowler (1895 – 1917) was an Irish-bred, British-trained Thoroughbred racehorse and sire. He showed very good form as a two-year-old in 1897 when he won three of his five races and finished third in the Middle Park Plate. In the following year he ran fourth in the 2000 Guineas and was fancied for the Epsom Derby before being scratched from the race. He returned in September to win the St Leger, upsetting the Derby winner Jeddah but did not race again. He stood as a breeding stallion in Ireland and France, but was not a great success. However, he did sire a top-class performer in Llangibby and an influential broodmare in Silver Fowl.

== Background ==
Wildfowler was a "cobby" chestnut horse with four white socks bred at the Barronstown House stud in Ireland (then part of the United Kingdom) by Henry Greer, who owned the colt during his racing career. Greer sent the colt to be trained by Sam Darling at Beckhampton who took a share in the ownership.

Wildfowler's sire Gallinule was a fast and precocious horse who won the National Breeders' Produce Stakes as a juvenile in 1886. He later became a successful breeding stallion whose other offspring included Pretty Polly and Night Hawk. Wildfowler's dam Tragedy won the Irish Derby in 1889 and went on to be an influential broodmare whose other descendants have included Birds Nest, Chelsea Rose, La Lagune, Lagunette and Sicambre.

== Racing career ==
=== 1897: two-year-old season ===
On his racecourse debut Wildfowler contested the Plantation Stakes at Newmarket Racecourse in July and looked to be lacking in both fitness and experience as he finished third behind Lucknow and Stream of Gold. Wildfowler won the Rous Plate at Doncaster Racecourse on 9 September, beating the filly St Ia in "decisive" fashion. In the Autumn Breeders' Foal Plate at Manchester two weeks later he won again, beating the subsequent 1000 Guineas winner Nun Nicer into second place. At the first October meeting at Newmarket, Wildfowler claimed his third consecutive victory by taking the Rutland Stakes. In the Middle Park Plate over six furlongs at Newmarket on 15 October, Wildfowler started the 7/2 second favourite. Ridden by John Watts he finished third behind Dieudonne and Disraeli, beaten three lengths and a head.

=== 1898: three-year-old season ===
On his first appearance of 1898 Wildfowler was beaten at odds of 1/10 by his solitary opponent in the Drakelow Stakes at Derby Racecourse. In the 2000 Guineas over the Rowley Mile at Newmarket on 27 April Wildfowler was ridden by Fred Allsopp and started at odds of 10/1 in a thirteen-runner field. He tracked the leaders before taking the lead in the last quarter mile but was overtaken in the closing stages and finished fourth behind Disraeli, Wantage and Ninus. Wildfowler was among the leading fancies for the Epsom Derby on 25 May but was withdrawn a week before the race.

The 123rd edition of the St Leger was contested over 14 1/2 furlongs at Doncaster on 7 September and saw Wildfowler, with Charles Wood in the saddle, start the 10/1 second choice in the betting. The Derby winner Jeddah was made the 5/6 favourite while the other ten runners included Disraeli, Pheon and Ninus. Heckler set the pace from Ninus before Jeddah took the lead entering the straight. Wildfowler came from well off the pace, overtook the favourite just inside the final furlong and drew away to win by four lengths from Jeddah, with six lengths back to the 25/1 outsider Bridegroom in third.

Wildfowler was put up for auction at Newmarket on 26 October and was bought by Henry Greer for 5,500 guineas in a transaction which saw Greer buy out Sam Darling's share in the horse.

== Stud record ==
At the end of his racing career, Wildfowler was retired to become breeding stallion at Greer's stud. In 1908 he was sold for 5,000 guineas and exported to France. Wildfowler died in 1917 at the Bel-Ebat Stud in La Celle-Saint-Cloud, France.

The best of his offspring was Llangibby, who was placed in the 2000 Guineas in 1905 before winning the Eclipse Stakes as a four-year-old in 1906. His daughter Silver Fowl produced Fifinella and was the female-line ancestor of many other major winners.

== Sire line tree ==
- Wildfowler
  - Llangibby
    - Land Of Song
    - Lanius (1911)
      - Stand By
        - Wise Counsel
    - Cromdale
    - Dionysos
    - Lanius (1915)
  - Mayfowl
  - Twenty-Third
  - Wild Bouquet

== Pedigree ==
Pedigree of Wildfowler (GB), chestnut stallion, 1895
Sire Gallinule (GB) 1884	Isonomy (GB); 1875	Sterling	Oxford
Sire Gallinule (GB) 1884	Isonomy (GB); 1875	Sterling	Whisper
Sire Gallinule (GB) 1884	Isonomy (GB); 1875	Isola Bella	Stockwell*
Sire Gallinule (GB) 1884	Isonomy (GB); 1875	Isola Bella	Isoline
Sire Gallinule (GB) 1884	Moorhen (GB); 1873	Hermit	Newminster
Sire Gallinule (GB) 1884	Moorhen (GB); 1873	Hermit	Seclusion
Sire Gallinule (GB) 1884	Moorhen (GB); 1873	sister to Ryshworth	Skirmisher
Sire Gallinule (GB) 1884	Moorhen (GB); 1873	sister to Ryshworth	Vertumna*
Dam Tragedy (IRE) 1886	Ben Battle (GB); 1871	Rataplan	The Baron*
Dam Tragedy (IRE) 1886	Ben Battle (GB); 1871	Rataplan	Pocahontas*
Dam Tragedy (IRE) 1886	Ben Battle (GB); 1871	Young Alice	Young Melbourne
Dam Tragedy (IRE) 1886	Ben Battle (GB); 1871	Young Alice	Sweet Hawthorn
Dam Tragedy (IRE) 1886	The White Witch (IRE); 1878	Masinissa (FR)	The Flying Dutchman
Dam Tragedy (IRE) 1886	The White Witch (IRE); 1878	Masinissa (FR)	Calpurnia
Dam Tragedy (IRE) 1886	The White Witch (IRE); 1878	Jeu des Mots (GB)	King Tom
Dam Tragedy (IRE) 1886	The White Witch (IRE); 1878	Jeu des Mots (GB)	Jeu d'Esprit (Family 7-e)

* Wildfowler is inbred 5S x 6S x 4D to the stallion The Baron, meaning that he appears fifth generation (via Stockwell) and sixth generation (via Vertumna) on the sire side of his pedigree, and fourth generation on the dam side of his pedigree.

* Wildfowler is inbred 5S x 6S x 4D to the mare Pocahontas, meaning that she appears fifth generation (via Stockwell) and sixth generation (via Vertumna) on the sire side of his pedigree, and fourth generation on the dam side of his pedigree.

* Wildfowler is inbred 4S x 5S to the stallion Stockwell, meaning that he appears fourth generation and fifth generation (via Vertumna) on the sire side of his pedigree.
