= Star Shoot =

Irish-bred Thoroughbred racehorse

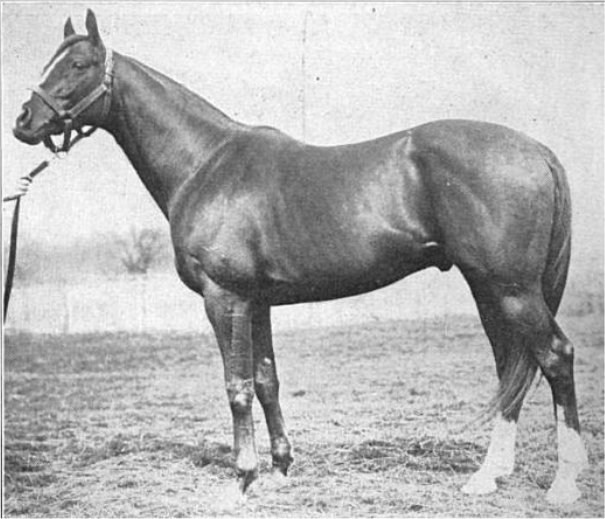
- Star Shoot, circa 1911
- Sire: Isinglass
- Grandsire: Isonomy
- Dam: Astrology
- Damsire: Hermit
- Sex: Stallion
- Foaled: 1898
- Country: Ireland
- Colour: Chestnut
- Breeder: Eyrefield Lodge Stud
- Owner: 1) Major Eustace Loder; 2) John Hanning; 3) Runnymede Farm; 4) John E. Madden
- Trainer: John Huggins (1900)
- Record: 10: 3-1-3

Major wins
- Hurst Park Foal Plate (1900); British Dominion Two-Year-Old Plate (1900); National Breeders' Produce Stakes (1900)

Awards
- Leading sire in North America (1911, 1912, 1916, 1917, 1919); Leading broodmare sire in North America (1924-1929)

Honours
- Star Shoot Stakes at Woodbine Racetrack Star Shoot Parkway in Lexington, Kentucky
- Last updated on April 17, 2010

Star Shoot (1898 – November 19, 1919) was a Thoroughbred racehorse that was bred in Ireland, raced in the United Kingdom and was eventually imported to the United States to become a five-time leading sire in the early 1900s. He was a white stockinged, chestnut colt sired by the great British 1893 Triple Crown winner, Isinglass, out of the Hermit bred mare Astrology. He is best remembered for siring the American Classic winning sons Sir Barton and Grey Lag and the 1917 American Oaks winning filly Wistful I.

== Early years and racing ==
Star Shoot was bred and foaled in 1898 at Eyrefield Lodge Stud in Caragh, which was owned by Major Eustace Loder. He was a sickly foal but did recover to be a major two-year-old contender in the British racing circuit, finishing second at his debut at the Summer Breeders' Foal Plate in June 1900. Star Shoot won the Hurst Park Foal Plate, British Dominion Two-Year-Old Plate and won the National Breeders' Produce Stakes in a dead heat. However, he soon developed respiratory problems that negatively impacted his racing performance thereafter and consequently he was not entered in any British Classic races.

== Years at stud ==
Due to his respiratory issues and having developed soft feet, Star Shoot was not seen as a good breeding prospect in Britain and was sold in 1901 to an American Thoroughbred importer named John Hanning for a fraction of what other horses of his breeding fetched. He was bought by Runnymede Farm in Paris, Kentucky and stood at stud there until 1912 when he was purchased by John E. Madden. Star Shoot was moved to Hamburg Place Stud, Madden's farm near Lexington, Kentucky. Star Shoot died of pneumonia on November 19, 1919 and was buried in the equine cemetery at Hamburg Place Farm.

== Progeny ==
Star Shoot notably sired Sir Barton, the first winner of the Triple Crown and Grey Lag, winner of the 1921 Belmont Stakes. He also sired the broodmares Christmas Star (dam of Mars), Livonia (dam of The Finn) and Daylight Saving. He was determined to be the leading sire in North America five times (in 1911, 1912, 1916, 1917 and 1919) and was top broodmare sire from 1924-1929.

== Sire line tree ==
- Star Shoot
  - Beacon Light
  - Kentucky Beau
  - Uncle
    - Old Rosebud
    - Step Along
  - Great Heavens
  - Captain Ross
  - Colinet
  - Any Port
  - Bourbon Beau
  - Star Charter
  - Eyebrow
  - Magneto
  - Helios
  - Solar Star
  - Ivory Black
  - Star Master
    - Kildare
    - McCarthy
  - Stargazer
  - Audacious
    - Storm
    - Foolhardy
  - Sir Barton
  - Star Hampton
  - Georgie
  - Grey Lag
  - Hildur
    - Main Man
  - Arendal

== Pedigree ==
Pedigree of Star Shoot, chestnut stallion, 1898
| Sire Isinglass | Isonomy | Sterling | Oxford |
| Sire Isinglass | Isonomy | Sterling | Whisper |
| Sire Isinglass | Isonomy | Isola Bella | Stockwell |
| Sire Isinglass | Isonomy | Isola Bella | Isoline |
| Sire Isinglass | Dead Lock | Wenlock | Lord Clifden* |
| Sire Isinglass | Dead Lock | Wenlock | Mineral |
| Sire Isinglass | Dead Lock | Malpractice | Chevalier d'Industrie |
| Sire Isinglass | Dead Lock | Malpractice | The Dutchman's Daughter |
| Dam Astrology | Hermit | Newminster* | Touchstone* |
| Dam Astrology | Hermit | Newminster* | Beeswing* |
| Dam Astrology | Hermit | Seclusion | Tadmor |
| Dam Astrology | Hermit | Seclusion | Miss Sellon |
| Dam Astrology | Stella | Brother To Stratford | Young Melbourne |
| Dam Astrology | Stella | Brother To Stratford | Gameboy mare |
| Dam Astrology | Stella | Toxophilite mare | Toxophilite |
| Dam Astrology | Stella | Toxophilite mare | Maid of Masham (family: 9-f) |

* Star Shoot is inbred 5S x 3D to the stallion Newminster, meaning that he appears fifth generation (via Lord Clifden) on the sire side of his pedigree, and third generation on the dam side of his pedigree.
