= Night Hawk (horse) =

British-bred Thoroughbred racehorse

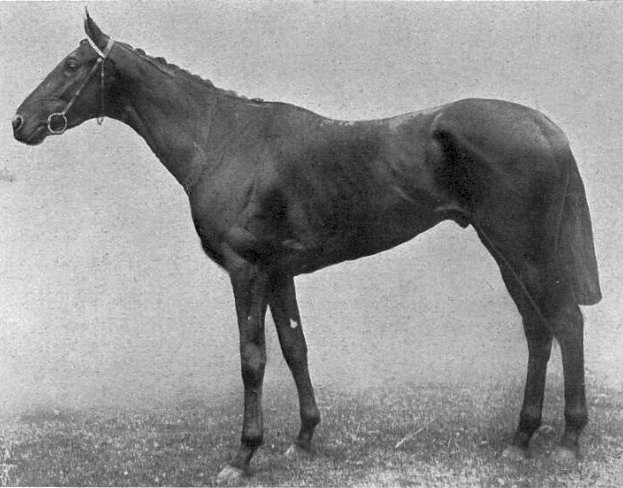
- Night Hawk in 1913.
- Sire: Gallinule
- Grandsire: Isonomy
- Dam: Jean's Folly
- Damsire: Ayrshire
- Sex: Stallion
- Foaled: 1910
- Country: United Kingdom of Great Britain and Ireland
- Colour: Bay
- Breeder: William Hall Walker
- Owner: William Hall Walker
- Trainer: William "Jack" Robinson
- Record: 10: 1-2-1
- Earnings: £6,450

Major wins
- St Leger (1913)

Night Hawk (1910 – after 1924) was an Irish-bred, British-trained Thoroughbred racehorse and sire. He was unraced as a juvenile and showed solid, but unremarkable form in his first four starts as a three-year-old in 1913 before recording a 50/1 upset victory in the St Leger. He failed to win or place in five subsequent races and was retired at the end of 1914. He has been described as one of the worst classic winners of the 20th century. He made no impact as a breeding stallion. It was said of him "Night Hawk has only one speed, but he stays forever".

== Background ==
Night Hawk was a bay horse bred by his owner William Hall Walker in County Kildare, Ireland (then a part of the United Kingdom). He was sent into training with William Thomas "Jack" Robinson at his Foxhill stables in Wiltshire.

Night Hawk's sire Gallinule won the National Breeders' Produce Stakes as a juvenile in 1886. He later became a breeding stallion whose other offspring included Pretty Polly and Wildfowler. Night Hawk was one of ten winners produced by the broodmare Jean's Folly. Her dam, Black Cherry, was the direct female ancestor of numerous successful Thoroughbreds including Blandford, Sun Chariot, Carrozza, Sherluck, Santa Claus, Shahrastani.

== Racing career ==
=== 1913: three-year-old season ===
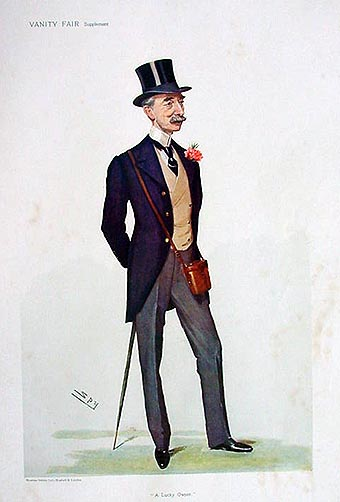
Night Hawk's owner William Hall Walker

Having been unraced as a juvenile, Night Hawk made his racecourse debut at Hurst Park in late May when he ran fourth behind Fairy King, Pandeen and Aghdoe in a race over one mile. In the St George Stakes over eleven furlongs at Liverpool on 23 July Night Hawk finished second to Aghdoe with the Epsom Derby winner Aboyeur in third. He then returned to Hurst Park and ran second to Birlingham over ten furlongs. At Derby Racecourse in early September Night Hawk ran third behind Roseworthy and the 2000 Guineas winner Louvois, receiving fifteen pounds in weight from the first two.

On 10 September Night Hawk contested the 138th running of the St Leger Stakes over 14 1/2 furlongs on unusually hard ground at Doncaster Racecourse. Ridden by Elijah Wheatley he started a 50/1 outsider in a twelve-runner field which included Louvois (the 9/4 favourite), Aghdoe, Bachelor's Wedding (Irish Derby, Roseworthy, Birlingham and Seremond Richmond Stakes. Louvois led and set a very fast pace until half a mile from the finish when he gave way to Seremond who was in turn overtaken by Jack Joel's White Magic. Night Hawk, however, having been tailed-off in last place at one point, made rapid progress through the field, took the lead approaching the last quarter mile and won "easily" by two lengths from White Magic, with three lengths back to Seremond in third. The winning time of 3:03.6 was a new record for the race. William Hall Walker, who did not attend the race, was recording his first success in the St Leger, although he had bred two previous winners of the classic in Prince Palatine and Minoru. An unusual feature of the result was that while the first three home were all outsiders, the first three in the betting- Louvois, Aghdoe and Bachelor's Wedding were the last three to finish.

In October Night Hawk started joint-favourite for the Cesarewitch Handicap over two and a quarter miles at Newmarket Racecourse but looked beaten a long way from home and finished unplaced behind the 50/1 winner Fiz-Yama. On 5 November Night Hawk finished last of the five runners in the Liverpool St Leger.

Night Hawk ended the season with earnings of £6,450.

=== 1914: four-year-old season ===
Night Hawk remainedin training asafour-year-old but failed to win a race. At Royal Ascot in June he finished ninth of the ten runners behind the five-year-old Aleppo the Ascot Gold Cup. In late July he ran unplaced behind Collodion in the Goodwood Plate over two miles and three furlongs.

== Assessment and honours ==
In their book, A Century of Champions, based on the Timeform rating system, John Randall and Tony Morris rated Night Hawk as the worst St Leger winner of the 20th century.

== Stud record ==
At the end of his racing career Night Hawk was retired to become a breeding stallion and was subsequently exported to stand in New South Wales, Australia. Bought for 500 guineas by Reginald White of the Merton Stud, he arrived in Sydney on 25 November 1918, but by that time, White had decided to sell his stud farm. He was sold to the Martindale Stud at Muswellbrook in April 1919. Night Hawk had very little success as a sire of winners.

== Pedigree ==
Pedigree of Night Hawk (GB), bay stallion, 1910
Sire Gallinule (GB) 1884	Isonomy (GB); 1875	Sterling*	Oxford*
Sire Gallinule (GB) 1884	Isonomy (GB); 1875	Sterling*	Whisper*
Sire Gallinule (GB) 1884	Isonomy (GB); 1875	Isola Bella	Stockwell*
Sire Gallinule (GB) 1884	Isonomy (GB); 1875	Isola Bella	Isoline
Sire Gallinule (GB) 1884	Moorhen (GB); 1873	Hermit	Newminster*
Sire Gallinule (GB) 1884	Moorhen (GB); 1873	Hermit	Seclusion
Sire Gallinule (GB) 1884	Moorhen (GB); 1873	sister to Ryshworth	Skirmisher
Sire Gallinule (GB) 1884	Moorhen (GB); 1873	sister to Ryshworth	Vertumna*
Dam Jean's Folly (GB) 1901	Ayrshire (GB); 1885	Hampton	Lord Clifden*
Dam Jean's Folly (GB) 1901	Ayrshire (GB); 1885	Hampton	Lady Langden
Dam Jean's Folly (GB) 1901	Ayrshire (GB); 1885	Atalanta	Galopin*
Dam Jean's Folly (GB) 1901	Ayrshire (GB); 1885	Atalanta	Feronia
Dam Jean's Folly (GB) 1901	Black Cherry (GB); 1892	Bendigo	Ben Battle
Dam Jean's Folly (GB) 1901	Black Cherry (GB); 1892	Bendigo	Hasty Girl
Dam Jean's Folly (GB) 1901	Black Cherry (GB); 1892	Black Duchess	Galliard*
Dam Jean's Folly (GB) 1901	Black Cherry (GB); 1892	Black Duchess	Black Corrie* (Family 3-o)

* Night Hawk is inbred 3S x 5D to the stallion Sterling, meaning that he appears third generation on the sire side of his pedigree, and fifth generation (via Black Corrie) on the dam side of his pedigree.

* Night Hawk is inbred 4S x 5S to the stallion Stockwell, meaning that he appears fourth generation and fifth generation (via Vertumna) on the sire side of his pedigree.

* Night Hawk is inbred 4S x 5D to the stallion Newminster, meaning that he appears fourth generation on the sire side of his pedigree, and fifth generation (via Lord Clifden) on the dam side of his pedigree.

* Night Hawk is inbred 4D x 5D to the stallion Galopin, meaning that he appears fourth generation and fifth generation (via Galliard) on the dam side of his pedigree.
