= Kinley Mack =

American Thoroughbred racehorse

- Sire: Islington
- Grandsire: Isonomy
- Dam: Songstress
- Damsire: Luke Blackburn
- Sex: Stallion
- Foaled: 1896
- Country: United States
- Color: Bay
- Breeder: Samuel E. Larabie
- Owner: 1) Augustus Eastin & Samuel E. Larabie; 2) James B. A. Haggin (3/1901)
- Trainer: Peter Wimmer

Major wins
- Reapers Stakes (1899); United States Hotel Stakes (1899); Autumn Cup Handicap (1900); Brooklyn Handicap (1900); First Special Stakes (1900); Suburban Handicap (1900)

Awards
- American Champion Handicap Male Horse (1900)

Honors
- Kinley Mack Graded Handicap at Aqueduct Racetrack

Kinley Mack (foaled 1896 in Montana) was an American National Champion Thoroughbred racehorse whose racing accomplishments included breaking a track record at Sheepshead Bay Race Track and becoming the first horse to ever win both the Brooklyn and the Suburban Handicaps.

== Pedigree ==
Pedigree of Kinley Mack, bay stallion, 1896
Sire Islington	Isonomy	Sterling	Oxford
Sire Islington	Isonomy	Sterling	Whisper
Sire Islington	Isonomy	Isola Bella	Stockwell
Sire Islington	Isonomy	Isola Bella	Isoline
Sire Islington	Dead Lock	Wenlock	Lord Clifden*
Sire Islington	Dead Lock	Wenlock	Mineral
Sire Islington	Dead Lock	Malpractice	Chevalier d'Industrie
Sire Islington	Dead Lock	Malpractice	The Dutchman's Daughter
Dam Songstress	Luke Blackburn	Bonnie Scotland	Iago
Dam Songstress	Luke Blackburn	Bonnie Scotland	Queen Mary
Dam Songstress	Luke Blackburn	Nevada	Lexington
Dam Songstress	Luke Blackburn	Nevada	Lightsome
Dam Songstress	Malibran	Cathedral	Newminster*
Dam Songstress	Malibran	Cathedral	Stolen Moments
Dam Songstress	Malibran	Melodious	Peppermint
Dam Songstress	Malibran	Melodious	Harp (family: 26)

* Kinley Mack is inbred 5S x 4D to the stallion Newminster, meaning that he appears fifth generation (via Lord Clifden) on the sire side of his pedigree, and fourth generation on the dam side of his pedigree.
