= Cherry Lass =

British-bred Thoroughbred racehorse

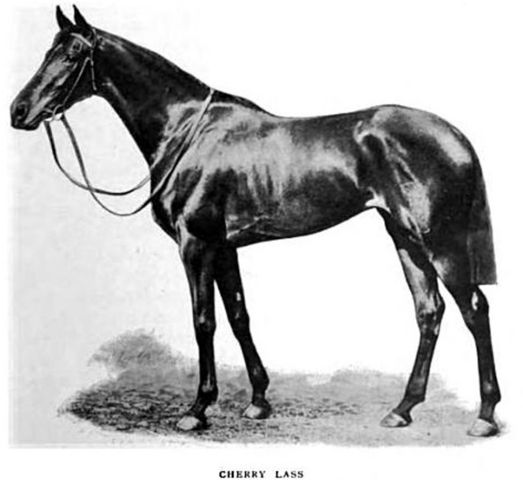
- Cherry Lass, circa 1905
- Sire: Isinglass
- Grandsire: Isonomy
- Dam: Black Cherry
- Damsire: Macaroni
- Sex: Mare
- Foaled: 1902
- Country: United Kingdom
- Colour: Bay
- Breeder: William Hall Walker
- Owner: William Hall Walker
- Trainer: William Thomas "Jack" Robinson
- Record: 15:9–1–1
- Earnings: £15,000

Major wins
- Anglesey Stakes (1904)); Free Handicap (1904); 1000 Guineas (1905); Epsom Oaks (1905); St. James's Palace Stakes (1905); Nassau Stakes (1905); Newmarket Oaks (1905)

Awards
- Leading British money winner (1905)

Cherry Lass (1902–1914), was a British Thoroughbred racehorse and broodmare who won two British Classic Races in 1905. In a racing career which lasted from summer 1904 until October 1905 she ran fifteen times and won nine races. As a three-year-old she won the 1000 Guineas over one mile at Newmarket and The Oaks over one and a half miles at Epsom Downs Racecourse a month later. She went on to win the St. James's Palace Stakes at Royal Ascot and the Nassau Stakes at Goodwood before finishing third when favourite for the St Leger Stakes. She was then retired to stud where she showed some promise as a broodmare before her death in 1914.

== Background ==
Cherry Lass was a bay mare bred either by her owner William Hall Walker, later ennobled as Lord Wavertree, or by Mr M. Gurry. Hall Walker's racing operation was a small but select one: in mid 1905 he had only six horses in training, four of whom won races at Royal Ascot. Cherry Lass was one of the best horses sired by Isinglass the 1893 Triple Crown winner. Her dam, Black Cherry, was a moderate racehorse, but a great success at stud, being the direct female ancestor of numerous successful Thoroughbreds including Blandford, Sun Chariot, Carrozza, Sherluck, Santa Claus, Shahrastani.

Hall Walker sent the filly into training with William Thomas "Jack" Robinson at his Foxhill stables in Wiltshire.

== Racing career ==
=== 1904: two-year-old season ===
Cherry Lass ran seven times in England and Ireland as a two-year-old in 1904 and won three races. Her wins came in the Mersey Stakes at Liverpool, the Anglesey Stakes at the Curragh and the Free Handicap at Newmarket, yielding winnings of £1,946. She also finished second to St. Brendan in the Leopardstown Grand Plate. Despite her wins she was not considered among the best of her generation.

=== 1905: three-year-old season ===
On 5 May Cherry Lass started the 5/4 favourite in a large, but apparently undistinguished field of nineteen, for the 1000 Guineas over Newmarket's Rowley mile course. Ridden by George McCall, Cherry Lass was boxed in and struggled to obtain room for a challenge and then lost ground by swerving when an opening appeared. Under a vigorous ride from McCall, she took the lead a furlong from the finish and won by a length from Koorhaan, with Jongleuse three lengths back in third. Cherry Lass appeared to have bumped Koorhaan in the closing stages, but the owner of the runner-up declined to lodge an objection. The win gave Robinson a double as he had trained the colt Vedas to win the 2000 Guineas over the same course and distance two days earlier.

Herbert Jones took over the ride on Cherry Lass in the Oaks four weeks later and she started the 4/5 favourite against eleven rivals. Before the race she appeared rather excitable and nervous, but was extremely impressive with the Sporting Life describing her as "the Queen of the Paddock- a real beauty". After Queen of the Earth made the early running, Jones sent Cherry Lass into the lead a mile from the finish and the favourite won by three lengths. Queen of the Earth was six lengths clear of the rest in second place. Her winning time of 2:38.0 broke the race record and was faster than the time recorded by Cicero in the Epsom Derby two days before. Her performance persuaded some observers to revise their poor opinion of the year's crop of fillies and some speculated that she would have won the Derby.

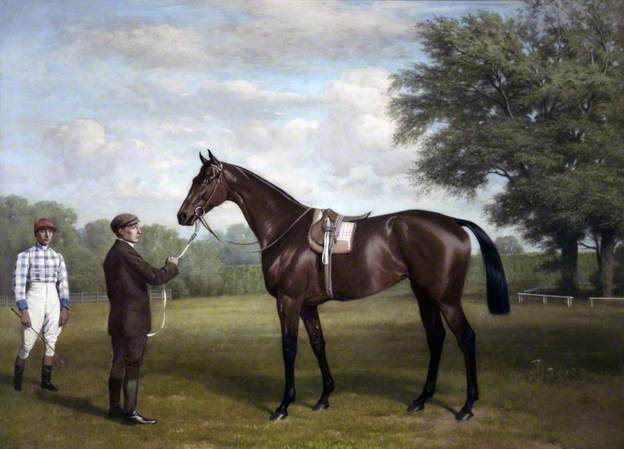
Cherry Lass, by Emil Adam

At Royal Ascot later in June, Cherry Lass was tried against colts in the St James's Palace Stakes and beat her three rivals at odds of 6/100. Second place went to Polymelus, later to be the five time champion sire. The meeting was a good one for her family as her younger brother Black Arrow was an impressive winner of the Coventry Stakes. In July, Cherry Lass beat Queen of the Earth again in the Duchess of York Plate at Hurst Park and won the Nassau Stakes over ten furlongs at Goodwood at odds of 1/9.

In the build-up to the St Leger in autumn, Cherry Lass was regarded as one of the three leading contenders, alongside Cicero and the French colt Val d'Or, who had beaten the Derby winner in the Eclipse Stakes. When Cicero was withdrawn with a leg injury, and Val d'Or was prevented from crossing the English Channel from France by rough weather, Cherry Lass was made 6/4 favourite for the final classic at Doncaster on 13 September. The result of the race was a major upset, with the outsider Challacombe winning easily by three lengths from Polymelus in record time. Cherry Lass led the race in the straight but dropped back in the closing stages to finish third, and ending her bid for the Fillies Triple Crown in British horse-racing. In October, Cherry Lass contested the Newmarket Oaks, in which she conceded nine pounds to the Park Hill Stakes winner Adula. Despite being opposed in the betting and running over a supposedly unsuitable distance of fourteen furlongs she won the race "in a canter". Her win took her earnings for the season to £13,119, making her the biggest money winner of the year in Britain. Her winnings enabled Robinson to claim the title of champion trainer whilst Hall Walker took the owners' championship. In November, Cherry Lass was fourth in the one and a quarter mile Free Handicap run at Newmarket, losing to the colt Outbreak.

== Assessment and honours ==
In their book, A Century of Champions, based on the Timeform rating system, John Randall and Tony Morris rated Cherry Lass an "average" winner of the 1000 Guineas and Oaks.

== Stud career ==
In March 1914 Cherry Lass was heavily pregnant to Royal Realm and was staying at the Tully Stud Farm alongside Mother Siegel, the dam of the Derby winner Minoru. The two mares bolted after being startled by the bells carried on a passing wagon, and Cherry Lass went into premature labour as a result. According to the press report the foal was "badly placed, and in its struggles fatally injured the mare". The mare was euthanised and the foal died.

Cherry Lass had produced four foals, the best of whom was a colt named Absolute, who won the Jubilee Handicap at Kempton Park before being exported to Italy. Her daughter Mabel Grey had been a fancied contender for the 1911 Oaks but broke her leg in training. Another daughter, Dorothy Court, produced Cherry Court who had some success as a broodmare in the United States.

== Pedigree ==
Pedigree of Cherry Lass (GB), bay mare, 1902
Sire Isinglass (GB) 1890	Isonomy; 1875	Sterling	Oxford
Sire Isinglass (GB) 1890	Isonomy; 1875	Sterling	Whisper
Sire Isinglass (GB) 1890	Isonomy; 1875	Isola Bella	Stockwell
Sire Isinglass (GB) 1890	Isonomy; 1875	Isola Bella	Isoline
Sire Isinglass (GB) 1890	Dead Lock; 1878	Wenlock	Lord Clifden
Sire Isinglass (GB) 1890	Dead Lock; 1878	Wenlock	Mineral
Sire Isinglass (GB) 1890	Dead Lock; 1878	Malpractice	Chevalier d'Industrie
Sire Isinglass (GB) 1890	Dead Lock; 1878	Malpractice	The Dutchman's Daughter
Dam Black Cherry (GB) 1892	Bendigo; 1880	Ben Battle	Rataplan
Dam Black Cherry (GB) 1892	Bendigo; 1880	Ben Battle	Young Alice
Dam Black Cherry (GB) 1892	Bendigo; 1880	Hasty Girl	Lord Gough
Dam Black Cherry (GB) 1892	Bendigo; 1880	Hasty Girl	Irritation
Dam Black Cherry (GB) 1892	Black Duchess; 1886	Galliard	Galopin
Dam Black Cherry (GB) 1892	Black Duchess; 1886	Galliard	Mavis
Dam Black Cherry (GB) 1892	Black Duchess; 1886	Black Corrie	Sterling
Dam Black Cherry (GB) 1892	Black Duchess; 1886	Black Corrie	Wild Dayrell mare (Family:3-o)

Cherry Lass was inbred 3 × 4 to Sterling, meaning that this stallion appears in both the third and fourth generations of her pedigree.
