= Louvois (horse) =

British-bred Thoroughbred racehorse

- Sire: Isinglass
- Grandsire: Isonomy
- Dam: St Louvaine
- Damsire: Wolf's Crag
- Sex: Stallion
- Foaled: 1910
- Country: United Kingdom
- Colour: Bay
- Breeder: Walter Raphael
- Owner: Walter Raphael
- Trainer: Dawson Waugh
- Record: 14: 6-3-3

Major wins
- Dewhurst Stakes (1912); 2000 Guineas (1913); Prince of Wales's Stakes (1913)

Louvois (1910 – 1927) was a British Thoroughbred racehorse and sire. He showed very promising form as a two-year-old in 1912 when he won four races including the Dewhurst Stakes as well as finishing third in the Middle Park Plate. In the following spring he was placed first in the 2000 Guineas despite serious doubts about whether he had actually crossed the line in front, and was then awarded second place in an extremely controversial race for the Epsom Derby. He went on to win the Prince of Wales's Stakes and finish second in the Eclipse Stakes before running unplaced when favourite for the St Leger. After his retirement from racing he had some success as a breeding stallion.

== Background ==
Louvois was a bay horse with a narrow white blaze bred and owned by the financier Walter Raphael. The colt was sent into training with Dawson Waugh at his Somerville Lodge stable in Newmarket, Suffolk. Waugh had trained Raphael's filly Tagalie to win the Derby in 1912. Physically, Louvois was described as "not very impressive... built on slightly greyhound lines, tucked up and with a very light middle piece" but with a "very honest head".

His sire Isinglass was an outstanding racehorse who won the Triple Crown in 1893. The best of his other progeny included Cherry Lass and Glass Doll. Louvois' dam St Louvaine, who had been bought by Raphael in 1901 for 1200 guineas, also produced Louviers, who finished second in the 1909 Epsom Derby. She was a granddaughter of Ulster Queen whose other descendants included Cap and Bells II.

== Racing career ==
=== 1912: two-year-old season ===
Louvois began his racing career with an easy win against moderate opposition in the Khedive Plate at Newmarket Racecourse but in the Prince of Wales Stakes at Goodwood Racecourse in late July or early August when he failed to recover from a bad start and finished last of the four runners. His four remaining races were all at Newmarket in autumn. In early October he recorded two comfortable victories, beating Sun Yat in the Buckenham Stakes, before turning out again a day later to take the Boscawen Stakes. In the Middle Park Plate over six furlongs on 17 October Louvois finished third behind Craganour and Shogun, beaten six lengths by the winner. Two weeks later, ridden William Saxby he started at odds of 7/4 for the seven-furlong Dewhurst Stakes and won from Sanquhar with Rock Flint in third. After the race he was described as "an improving colt that is likely to develop into a stayer".

In the Free Handicap, a ranking of the year's best two-year-olds, Louvois was given a weight of 120 pounds, making him ten pounds inferior to the top-rated Craganour.

=== 1913: three-year-old season ===
In the spring of 1913 it was reported that Louvois had made exceptionally good progress over the winter. On 30 April, in front of a cowd which included King George V the colt stated a 25/1 outsider in a fifteen-runner field for the 105th running of the 2000 Guineas over the Rowley Mile course. Craganour, ridden by Saxby, started favourite ahead of Fairy King, with the other fancied runners were Sanquhar, Roseworthy, Bachelor's Wedding, Day Comet and Radiant. Ridden by the American jockey Johnny Reiff, Louvois tracked the leaders as Craganour set the pace, before making steady progress approaching the last quarter mile. In the final furlong Craganour appeared to be going very easily along the rail but Louvois maintained his run down the centre of the wide straight. The judge, a Mr Robinson, called Louvois the winner by a short head from Craganour, with the 50/1 outsider Meeting House two lengths back in third. The majority of the observers, however, disagreed with the judge verdict, believing that Craganour had won by about half a length, while others claimed that he was almost two lengths clear. It was suggested that the judge had been the victim of an "optical delusion".

On 21 May Louvois was moved up in distance for the Newmarket Stakes over ten furlongs in which he was ridden by Frank O'Neill, and ran third behind Craganour and Sun Yat in a race which reportedly saw a good deal of bumping and boring between the first three finishers. Despite his defeat Louvois was regarded as one of the leading contenders for the Epsom Derby, run over 1 1/2 miles on 4 June. In another jockey change, Saxby rode Louvois while Reiff took the ride on the favoured Craganour. The race proved to be exceptionally rough and controversial one and ended in a six-horse "blanket finish" with Craganour, Aboyeur, Day Comet, Louvois, Great Sport and Nimbus all finishing within a length of each other. The racecourse judge called Craganour the winner from Aboyeur and Louvois, ignoring the third-placed Day Comet who had been blocked from his view by other horses. After an objection and an inquiry by the racecourse stewards, Craganour was disqualified and Louvois (who had been one of the chief sufferers from the barging in the straight) promoted to second.

Two weeks after his run at Epsom, Louvois contested the Prince of Wales's Stakes (then a race confined to three-year-olds and run over thirteen furlongs) at Royal Ascot and won at odds of 4/9. On 18 July the colt was matched against older horses in the Eclipse Stakes over ten furlongs at Sandown Park and finished second behind the four-year-old Tracery with Bachelor's Wedding in third. At Liverpool on 25 July Louvois finished third behind the four-year-olds Junior and Kettle Jack in the ten-furlong Atlantic Stakes. On 3 September he finished second to Roseworthy in the Breeders' St Leger over eleven furlongs at Derby Racecourse. A week later Louvois started 9/4 favourite for the St Leger over 14 1/2 furlongs at Doncaster Racecourse but after leading in the early stages, he dropped from contention in the straight and finished unplaced behind Night Hawk.

Louvois ended the season with earnings of £9,075, making him the fifth most financially successful horse of the year behind Jest, The Tetrarch, Tracery and Cantilever.

== Assessment and honours ==
In their book, A Century of Champions, based on the Timeform rating system, John Randall and Tony Morris rated Louvois an "inferior" winner of the 2000 Guineas.

== Stud record ==
At the end of his racing career Louvois was retired to become a breeding stallion. The best of his offspring was probably St Louis, who won the 2000 Guineas in 1922. His last foals were born in 1927. Louvois died in March 1927 at the Lochbroom Stud, The Curragh, Ireland.

== Sire line tree ==
- Louvois
  - Parisian Diamond
  - Scapin
  - St Louis
    - Control
  - French Briar
  - Loufoque
  - Warminster

== Pedigree ==
Pedigree of Louvois (GB), bay stallion, 1910
Sire Isinglass (GB) 1890	Isonomy; 1875	Sterling	Oxford
Sire Isinglass (GB) 1890	Isonomy; 1875	Sterling	Whisper
Sire Isinglass (GB) 1890	Isonomy; 1875	Isola Bella	Stockwell*
Sire Isinglass (GB) 1890	Isonomy; 1875	Isola Bella	Isoline
Sire Isinglass (GB) 1890	Dead Lock; 1878	Wenlock	Lord Clifden
Sire Isinglass (GB) 1890	Dead Lock; 1878	Wenlock	Mineral
Sire Isinglass (GB) 1890	Dead Lock; 1878	Malpractice	Chevalier d'Industrie
Sire Isinglass (GB) 1890	Dead Lock; 1878	Malpractice	The Dutchman's Daughter
Dam St Louvaine (GB) 1898	Wolf's Crag; 1890	Barcaldine (IRE)	Solon
Dam St Louvaine (GB) 1898	Wolf's Crag; 1890	Barcaldine (IRE)	Ballyroan
Dam St Louvaine (GB) 1898	Wolf's Crag; 1890	Lucy Ashton	Lammermoor
Dam St Louvaine (GB) 1898	Wolf's Crag; 1890	Lucy Ashton	Alsatia
Dam St Louvaine (GB) 1898	St Reine (IRE); 1890	St Simon (GB)	Galopin
Dam St Louvaine (GB) 1898	St Reine (IRE); 1890	St Simon (GB)	St Angela
Dam St Louvaine (GB) 1898	St Reine (IRE); 1890	Ulster Queen (GB)	Uncas*
Dam St Louvaine (GB) 1898	St Reine (IRE); 1890	Ulster Queen (GB)	Pirate Queen (Family: 1-s)

* Louvois is inbred 4S x 5D to the stallion Stockwell, meaning that he appears fourth generation on the sire side of his pedigree, and fifth generation (via Uncas) on the dam side of his pedigree.
