= St Louis (horse) =

Irish-bred Thoroughbred racehorse

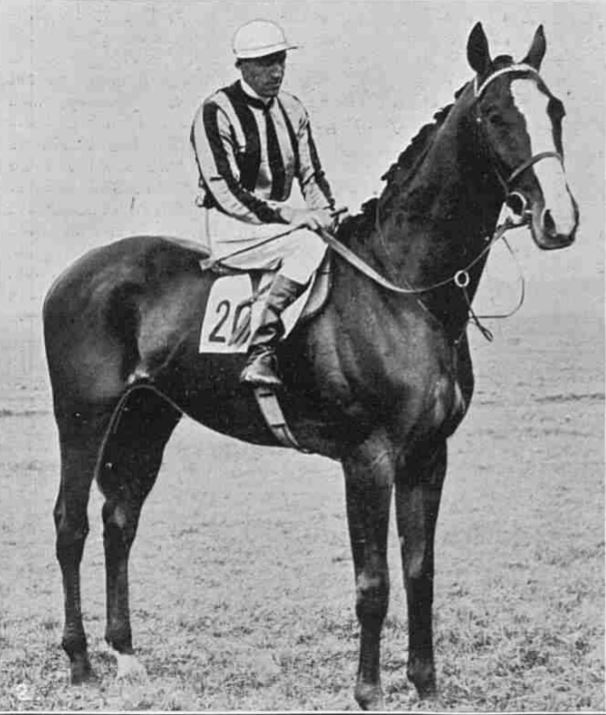
- St. Louis in 1922.
- Sire: Louvois
- Grandsire: Isinglass
- Dam: Princess Sterling
- Damsire: Florizel II
- Sex: Stallion
- Foaled: 1919
- Country: Ireland
- Colour: Bay
- Breeder: J J Maher
- Owner: Almeric Paget, 1st Baron Queenborough
- Trainer: Peter Gilpin
- Record: 6: 2-0-1
- Earnings: £11,084 (1922)

Major wins
- 2000 Guineas (1922)

St Louis (1919 – after 1933) was a thoroughbred racehorse and sire born in Ireland and trained in Great Britain. He finished unplaced on his only start as a juvenile but made rapid improvement over the winter and won the 2000 Guineas in April 1922. He finished fourth when favourite for the Epsom Derby and then won a minor race at Wolverhampton Racecourse but was withdrawn from the St Leger after running poorly in a trial race. After failing to win on his only run as a four-year-old he was retired to stud, but had no success as a breeding stallion.

== Background ==
St Louis was a "grand" bay horse with a white blaze bred at the Confey Stud in County Dublin by J J Maher. As a yearling he was offered for sale and bought for 2,600 guineas by the trainer Peter Gilpin on behalf of Almeric Paget, 1st Baron Queenborough. Gilpin trained the horse at his Clarehaven stable in Newmarket, Suffolk.

He was one of the best horses sired by Louvois who won the 2000 Guineas and was awarded second place in the Derby in 1913. St Louis's dam Princess Sterling was an influential broodmare whose female-line descendants included Noblesse who was in turn the ancestor of Rainbow Quest, Warning and Commander in Chief.

== Racing career ==
=== 1921: two-year-old season ===
St Louis made only one appearance on the track as a two-year-old and made little impression as he finished unplaced in a minor race.

=== 1922: three-year-old season ===
Ridden by the American jockey George Archibald, St Louis stated at odds of 6/1 in a 22-runner field for the 114th running of the 2000 Guineas over the Rowley Mile at Newmarket Racecourse on 26 April. Racing on soft ground he took the lead from Captain Cuttle in the final furlong and drew away to win easily by three lengths from Solomon Joel's Pondoland with the fading Captain Cuttle four lengths back in third. Lord Queenborough donated £200 of the prize money to two racing charities, namely the Rous Memorial Fund and the Bentinck Benevolent Fund. St Louis's success saw him elevated to favouritism for the Epsom Derby. On 29 May St Louis started favourite for the Derby over one and a half miles put appeared to be unsuited by the firmer ground and finished fourth behind Captain Cuttle, Tamar and Craigangower.

St Louis was off the course until August, when he started at odds of 1/9 against four moderate opponents in the Wolverhampton Breeder's Foal Plate over ten furlongs. With Archibald in the saddle he won very easily by five lengths from Clincher, to whom he was conceding 20 pounds in weight.

The colt was strongly fancied for the St Leger Stakes at Doncaster Racecourse in September, but in his final prep race he came home last of the three runners behind Express Delivery in the Great Yorkshire Stakes over one and a half mile at York, and was withdrawn from the Leger a few days later.

St Louis's earnings of £11,084 for the year made him the fifth most successful racehorse of the season.

=== 1923: four-year-old season ===
St Louis remained in training but was beaten on his only start. When he was put up for auction at the end of the year he failed to reach his reserve price of 4,200 guineas and was retained by his owner.

== Assessment and honours ==
In their book, A Century of Champions, based on the Timeform rating system, John Randall and Tony Morris rated St Louis a "poor" winner of the 2000 Guineas.

== Stud record ==
St Louis was retired to become a breeding stallion at Lord Queenborough's Snarehill Stud in Norfolk. He sired no major winners and his last reported foals were born in 1933.

== Pedigree ==
Pedigree of St Louis (GB), bay stallion, 1919
Sire Louvois (GB) 1910	Isinglass (GB); 1890	Isonomy	Sterling*
Sire Louvois (GB) 1910	Isinglass (GB); 1890	Isonomy	Isola Bella
Sire Louvois (GB) 1910	Isinglass (GB); 1890	Dead Lock	Wenlock
Sire Louvois (GB) 1910	Isinglass (GB); 1890	Dead Lock	Malpractice
Sire Louvois (GB) 1910	St Louvaine (GB); 1898	Wolf's Crag	Barcaldine
Sire Louvois (GB) 1910	St Louvaine (GB); 1898	Wolf's Crag	Lucy Ashton
Sire Louvois (GB) 1910	St Louvaine (GB); 1898	St Reine	St Simon*
Sire Louvois (GB) 1910	St Louvaine (GB); 1898	St Reine	Ulster Queen
Dam Princess Sterling (GB) 1910	Florizel II (GB); 1891	St Simon*	Galopin*
Dam Princess Sterling (GB) 1910	Florizel II (GB); 1891	St Simon*	St Angela*
Dam Princess Sterling (GB) 1910	Florizel II (GB); 1891	Perdita	Hampton
Dam Princess Sterling (GB) 1910	Florizel II (GB); 1891	Perdita	Hemione
Dam Princess Sterling (GB) 1910	Sterling Balm (GB); 1899	Friar's Balsam	Hermit
Dam Princess Sterling (GB) 1910	Sterling Balm (GB); 1899	Friar's Balsam	Flower of Dorset
Dam Princess Sterling (GB) 1910	Sterling Balm (GB); 1899	Yeterling	Sterling*
Dam Princess Sterling (GB) 1910	Sterling Balm (GB); 1899	Yeterling	Yessel (Family 14-f)

* St Louis is inbred 4S x 3D to the stallion St Simon, meaning that he appears fourth generation on the sire side of his pedigree, and third generation on the dam side of his pedigree.

* St Louis is inbred 4S x 4D to the stallion Sterling, meaning that he appears fourth generation on the sire side of his pedigree, and fourth generation on the dam side of his pedigree.
