= Sterling (horse) =

British-bred Thoroughbred racehorse

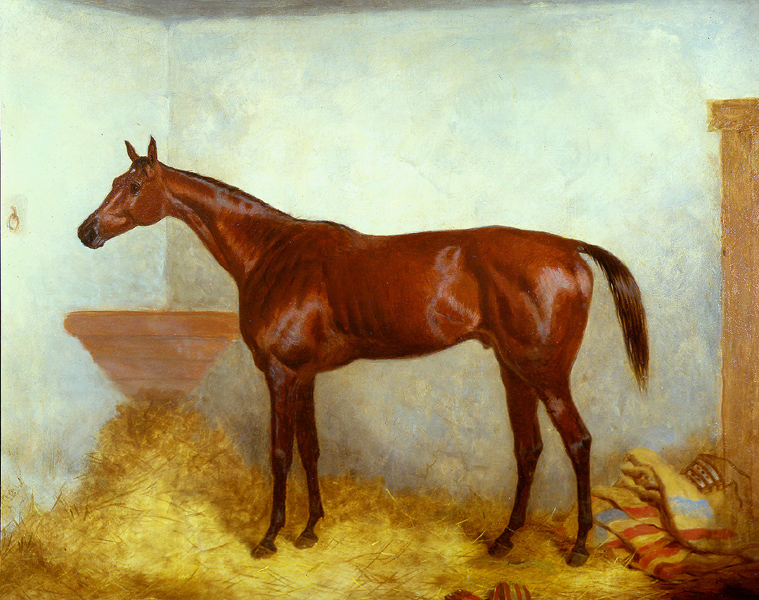
- Sterling by Harry Hall
- Sire: Oxford
- Grandsire: Birdcatcher
- Dam: Whisper
- Damsire: Flatcatcher
- Sex: Stallion
- Foaled: 1868
- Died: 26 March 1891 (aged 22–23)
- Country: United Kingdom
- Colour: Bay
- Breeder: Graham brothers
- Owner: Miss Graham

Sterling (1868 – 26 March 1891) was a British racehorse and sire. While not particularly successful in terms of major wins, he was very highly regarded, being rated by his jockey Harry Custance as the equal of Thormanby.

== Background ==
Sterling was a bay horse bred and owned by the Graham family who owned the Yardley Stud near Birmingham. His dam, Whisper, was bred by Mr. R. Taylor and produced ten foals between 1866 and her death in 1882. Sterling was her third foal and one of six sired by Oxford. Whisper's other good racers included Playfair.

== Racing career ==
Sterling won five races including the Liverpool Autumn Cup at Aintree Racecourse. He also finished second to Bothwell in the 2000 Guineas at Newmarket on 25 April 1871. In the autumn of 1871, the owner of the Belmont Stakes winner Harry Bassett's owner issued a challenge to the owner of Sterling for a one and a half mile match race at level weights, to be run in the United States. Sterling's owner responded by offering to put up £12,000 to the American's £8,000, but only if the match took place in England. The race never materialised.

== Stud career ==
Sterling was much more successful as a breeding stallion than he had been as a racehorse.

Foaled	Name	Sex	Major Wins/Achievements
1875	Isonomy	Stallion	Ascot Gold Cup (1879, 1880)
1881	Harvester	Stallion	Epsom Derby
1882	Paradox	Stallion	2000 Guineas Stakes
1884	Enterprise	Stallion	2000 Guineas Stakes
1886	Enthusiast	Stallion	2000 Guineas Stakes

Sterling died on 26 March 1891 at 23.

== Sire line tree ==
Descendants of Sterling (click to show)
- Sterling
  - Isonomy
    - Isobar
      - Destillateur
      - Iceland
    - Bonnet Rouge
    - Eiridspord
      - Challenger
      - Hymettus
      - Ranfurly
    - Gallinule
      - Ball Coote
      - Gazetteer
      - Lesterlin
        - Duke Of Leinster
        - Glenesky
      - Port Marnock
      - Gulsalberk
      - General Peace
        - Redmond
      - Dunamase
      - Noble Howard
      - Wildfowler
        - Llangibby
        - Mayfowl
        - Twenty-Third
        - Wild Bouquet
      - Oppressor
      - Travelling Lad
        - Ally Sloper
      - Steinort
      - Carrigavalla
      - Good Morning
      - Abt Vogler
      - Fariman
        - Armant
      - Christian De Wet
      - Glenamoy
      - Kosmos Bey
      - Penury
      - Santry
        - Dealer
        - Jingling Geordie
        - Sandro
        - Sanquhar
        - Sanguine
      - Galangal
      - The Gull
        - The Guller
      - Gala Wreath
      - Hammurabi
        - Meridian
      - Poussin
      - Rocketter
      - Sarcelle
      - Zadkiel
      - All Black
        - Bunting
        - Egypt
        - Pershore
        - Kickoff
        - All Sunshine
        - Nigger Minstrel
        - Balmerino
      - Goldminer
        - Goldcourt
      - Hermes
      - Slieve Gallion
        - Palatin
        - Onkel Ludwig
        - Pasztorfiu
        - Oktondi
        - Montalto
      - Weathercock
      - Petrillo
        - Portrush
      - Rodney
      - White Eagle
        - Let Fly
        - Durazzo
        - Bird Of Prey
        - Erne
        - Eagle's Pride
      - Arc De Triumphe
      - Cock-A-Hoop
      - Glasgerion
        - Carados
        - Fohanaun
      - Phaleron
      - Admiral Hawk
      - Galatine
      - Powhatan
      - Chilperic
      - Absolute
      - Gallon
        - Emigrant
      - Winstanley
      - Great Sport
        - Judge Fuller
      - L'Oiseau Lyre
      - Night Hawk
        - Zaporozec
      - Francinet
      - Torloisk
    - Isosceles
      - St Luke
    - Ruler
      - Aschabad
      - Hungarian
      - Mortimer
      - Lancelot
      - Atilla
      - Pickwick
        - Gajda
        - Petrarka
      - Homard
      - Smike
      - No Rule
        - Don Juan
      - Despot
      - Culloden
      - Trafalgar
      - Uzda
    - Clan Chattan
    - Fortunio
      - Delaunay
        - Quai De Fleurs
    - Galaor
      - Matador
      - Proponent
      - Weathercock
      - Capo Gallo
        - Unak
      - Apollo
      - Nesze
      - Firlej
    - Ingram
    - Queen's Counsel
    - Satiety
      - Piety
      - Silver Fox
        - The Policeman
    - Janissary
      - Jeddah
    - Common
      - Martin
      - Osbech
      - Uncommon
        - Czar
      - Cottager
      - Charcot
      - Mushroom
        - Beaumont
    - Hermence
      - Hermis
        - Prince Hermis
      - Herman Whit
    - Islington
      - Kinley Mack
    - Le Noir
    - Pilgrim's Progress
      - Lieutenant Bill
      - Abundance
        - Kandos
      - Pilgrim's Rest
      - Demas
      - Bunyan
      - Signor
    - Bunbury
    - Fatherless
    - Grand Duke
    - Isinglass
      - Gallerte
      - Jacobite
      - Star Shoot
        - Beacon Light
        - Kentucky Beau
        - Uncle
        - Great Heavens
        - Captain Ross
        - Colinet
        - Any Port
        - Bourbon Beau
        - Star Charter
        - Eyebrow
        - Magneto
        - Helios
        - Solar Star
        - Ivory Black
        - Star Master
        - Stargazer
        - Audacious
        - Sir Barton
        - Star Hampton
        - Georgie
        - Grey Lag
        - Hildur
        - Arendal
      - Veles
        - Vexillum
      - Rising Glass
      - Azamat
      - Kilglass
      - Agar
      - Challenger
        - Gillamatong
      - John O'Gaunt
        - Cardinal Beaufort
        - Swynford
        - Sobieski
        - Lancaster
        - Harry Of Hereford
        - Cressingham
        - Duke Humphrey
        - Kennymore
        - Thurnham
        - Burne Jones
        - Duke Of Lancaster
        - Black Gauntlet
        - Spithead
      - Pam
        - Hare Hill
        - Sir Tredennes
      - Prince George
      - The Scribe
        - Lempriere
      - Atlas
      - Decanter
      - Pure Crystal
      - Admiral Crichton
      - Glasconbury
      - Wombwell
      - Baltinglass
      - Pure Gem
        - Parazit
      - Carpathian
        - Tarzan
        - Morgan
      - Ednam
      - Louviers
        - Landgraf
      - Marble Arch
        - Mullingar
        - Uncle Ned
      - Eye Glass
      - Moenus
      - Louvois
        - Parisian Diamond
        - Scapin
        - St Louis
        - French Briar
        - Loufoque
        - Warminster
    - Prisoner
      - Antonio
        - Giru
    - Ravensbury
      - Belvoir
        - Kilbarry
      - Sandboy
      - Feather Bed
        - Lie-A-Bed
        - Knight Of Blyth
    - Bennitthorpe
    - Contract
      - Conby
    - Ivor
    - Son O'Mine
      - Querido
        - Amyntas
      - Herouval
      - Liao
      - Alvarez
        - Janus
      - Saint Ange
        - Harpocrate
    - Le Var
      - Outbreak
        - Civil War
  - Sterlingworth
  - Beaudesert
    - Stiletto
      - Porrazo
      - Pimiento
      - Americo
    - El Amigo
      - Etolo
      - Aji
      - Cincel
    - Fulminante
    - De Beavoir
    - Finance
  - Discount
  - Fernandez
    - Miguel
    - Gonsalvo
      - Tucka Tucka
    - Ferdinand
    - Foston
    - Wavelet's Pride
      - Rot's Pride
        - Jerpoint
      - Tidal Wave
      - Amberwave
  - Geologist
    - Ellison
    - Caliche
    - Shancrotha
  - Play Actor
    - David Trot
      - Be Careful
  - Energy
    - Gouverneur
      - Altgold
      - Connex
      - Flieder
      - Andiamo
      - Commandeur
      - Gastfreund
        - Marocco
      - Linos
      - Tuki
        - Iwnsweb
        - Jungturke
      - Saperloter
      - Liebesritter
      - Vicewachtmeister
      - Empereur
      - Tire-Haut
      - Frampol
      - Enguelade
      - Hazlehatch
      - Reinfall
      - Stossvogel
      - Damio
      - Journalist
      - Septimus
    - Reverend
      - Castelnau
      - Artisan
      - Sirdar
        - Amorek
        - Drzymala
      - Caius
        - Danilo
        - Csardas
        - Turmfalke
        - Indus
        - Wirbel
    - Energique
    - Le Chesnay
    - Rueil
      - Cazabat
      - Mauvezin
        - Aldford
        - War Shot
          - Cannon Shot
      - Sospiro
      - Farnus
      - Presto
    - Falmouth
    - Marly
  - Keir
  - The Golden Farmer
  - Harvester
    - Harvest Feast
    - Thorax
    - Lulu
    - Kevely
  - Esterling
    - Lord Esterling
    - Koran
  - Metal
    - Blue Metal
    - Parsee
  - Paradox
    - Unicorne
    - Red Ensign
    - Alconbury
      - Frodi
  - Atheling
    - Royal Emperor
    - Armeath
      - Armiak
      - Madrigalian
      - Bard Of Hope
        - Homestretch
    - Dublin
    - Short Hose
    - Bryn Mawr
      - Dalhousie
    - Alfar
  - Doubloon
    - Mortgage
    - Harvest Money
  - Silver
    - Harmonist
    - Vasquito
  - Stalwart
  - Cherry Ripe
    - Drogheda
    - Red Heart
    - Royal Cherry
    - Eulogy
    - Cerasus
    - Lord Rossmore
    - President Roosevelt
  - Enterprise
  - Top Gallant
    - Typhoon
    - Sydney Lucas
    - Japan
    - Migraine
    - The Minks
  - Loyalist
    - The Judge
    - Lissak
      - Claude
      - The Don
      - Pharmacy
  - Enthusiast
    - Eager
      - Eastern
      - Prince Olaf
        - Percy
        - Plato
        - Lantorna
      - Prince Rupert
      - Rangag
        - Irish Prince
      - Meleager
        - Portmore
        - Duende
      - Jaeger
      - Percival Keene
      - Sir Eager
        - Lord Of Burghley
        - Compiler
        - Drake
    - Succoth
      - Don Sancho
    - Lord Edward
    - Energetic
    - Glenapp
      - Fiery Cross
    - Bealderg
      - Halston
    - Meldhre
    - Lochryan
      - Lough Foyle
    - Roseate Dawn
    - Arranmore
      - Lowenherz
      - Rheinwein
        - Impet
        - Kares
  - Gold
    - King Gold
    - Aureus
    - Purser
  - Endurance
  - Paderewski
  - Encounter
  - Kingsley

== Pedigree ==
Pedigree of Sterling (GB), bay stallion, 1868
Sire Oxford (GB) 1857	Birdcatcher; 1833	Sir Hercules	Whalebone*
Sire Oxford (GB) 1857	Birdcatcher; 1833	Sir Hercules	Peri
Sire Oxford (GB) 1857	Birdcatcher; 1833	Guiccioli	Bob Booty
Sire Oxford (GB) 1857	Birdcatcher; 1833	Guiccioli	Flight
Sire Oxford (GB) 1857	Honey Dear; 1844	Plenipotentiary	Emilius
Sire Oxford (GB) 1857	Honey Dear; 1844	Plenipotentiary	Harriet
Sire Oxford (GB) 1857	Honey Dear; 1844	My Dear	Bay Middleton
Sire Oxford (GB) 1857	Honey Dear; 1844	My Dear	Miss Letty
Dam Whisper (GB) 1857	Flatcatcher; 1845	Touchstone	Camel*
Dam Whisper (GB) 1857	Flatcatcher; 1845	Touchstone	Banter
Dam Whisper (GB) 1857	Flatcatcher; 1845	Decoy	Filho da Puta
Dam Whisper (GB) 1857	Flatcatcher; 1845	Decoy	Finesse
Dam Whisper (GB) 1857	Silence; 1848	Melbourne	Humphrey Clinker
Dam Whisper (GB) 1857	Silence; 1848	Melbourne	Cervantes mare
Dam Whisper (GB) 1857	Silence; 1848	Secret	Horsea
Dam Whisper (GB) 1857	Silence; 1848	Secret	Solace (Family: 12-a)

* Sterling is inbred 4S x 5D to the stallion Whalebone, meaning that he appears fourth generation on the sire side of his pedigree, and fifth generation (via Camel) on the dam side of his pedigree.
