= Isonomy (horse) =

British Thoroughbred racehorse

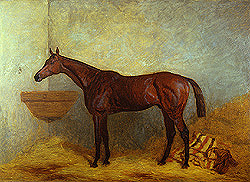
- Isonomy by Harry Hall
- Sire: Sterling
- Grandsire: Oxford
- Dam: Isola Bella
- Damsire: Stockwell
- Sex: Stallion
- Foaled: 1875
- Country: United Kingdom of Great Britain and Ireland
- Colour: Bay
- Breeder: Graham Bros.
- Owner: Frederick Gretton
- Trainer: John Porter
- Record: 14: 10–2–1

Major wins
- Cambridgeshire Handicap (1878); Gold Vase (1879); Ascot Gold Cup (1879, 1880); Goodwood Cup (1879); Ebor Handicap (1879); Doncaster Cup (1879)

Honours
- Prix Isonomy

Isonomy (May 1875 – April 1891) was a British Thoroughbred racehorse and sire. In a career that lasted from 1877 to 1880 he ran fourteen times and won ten races. As a three-year-old he deliberately bypassed the Classics in order that his owner could land a massive betting coup in the Cambridgeshire Handicap at Newmarket. In the following two seasons he was the dominant stayer in Britain, producing a series of performances which led many contemporary observers to regard him as one of the greatest racehorses of the 19th century. He was then retired to stud, where he became a successful stallion.

== Background ==
Isonomy was a late foal, being born in May 1875, and as a result he was, in his early life, smaller and less physically developed than other colts of his generation. Even in full maturity, he was not a large horse, standing just under 15.2 hands high. He was bred at the Yardley stud near Birmingham by the Graham brothers. When the leading trainer John Porter visited the stud, he was impressed by the colt's lively and assertive character, and determined to buy him. When Isonomy was sent to the yearling sale at Doncaster, Porter was able to acquire him for 320 guineas on behalf of Fredrick Gretton, a brewer with a passion for gambling. Isonomy was ridden in most of his races by Tom Cannon.

Isonomy's sire, Sterling, was a successful racehorse who became an excellent sire. Apart from Isonomy, he sired the 2000 Guineas winners Paradox, Enterprise and Enthusiast, and the Derby winner Harvester. Isonomy's dam, Isola Bella, was not a success as a racemare but was well-bred, being a half-sister to the Grand Prix de Paris winner Saint Christophe.

== Racing career ==
=== 1877: two-year-old season ===
As a two-year-old, Isonomy showed promise, without appearing to be top class. He made his first appearance over five furlongs at Brighton in August and finished second in a minor race. In September, he was sent to Newmarket and recorded his first win in a four-furlong Nursery (a handicap race for two-year-olds). On his final start he was narrowly beaten in a similar event at the same course, finishing second by a head when conceding eleven pounds to the winner.

=== 1878: three-year-old season ===
Isonomy's three-year-old campaign was a highly unorthodox one. While the other leading colts of his generation were contesting the classics, Isonomy's efforts were confined to the training gallops. The reason for this was a plan by Gretton to land a massive gamble in the Cambridgeshire Handicap at the end of the season at Newmarket. By autumn, Isonomy's useful two-year-old performances had been largely forgotten, and he was allowed to start at odds of 40/1 for the big handicap on 22 October under a weight of only 99 pounds. He created a "sensation" as he took the lead just inside the final furlong and won very easily by two lengths from Touchet and La Merveille. In addition to his winning prize of £2,187, Gretton's gamble earned him a reported £40,000, more than double the combined prize money of the Triple Crown races.

=== 1879: four-year-old season ===
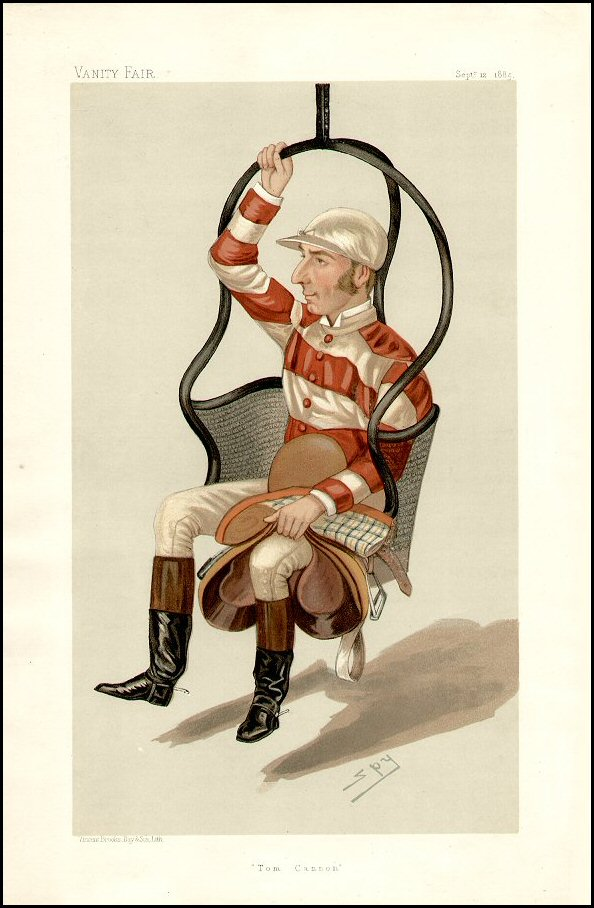
Tom Cannon, Isonomy's regular jockey

On his four-year-old debut, Isonomy carried 124 pounds in the Newmarket Handicap on 15 April and started 2/1 favourite. Among his opponents was the American horse Parole, who was not regarded as a serious threat by the British racegoers and started 100/15 fourth choice in the betting despite receiving eight pounds. Parole took the lead at half way and drew clear. Although Isonomy made steady progress he was unable to catch the leader and finished second, beaten one and a half lengths. Gretton then challenged Parole's owners to a £10,000 weight-for-age match race between the horses, but his offer was declined.

In June, Isonomy was sent to Royal Ascot where, on the first day of the meeting, he defeated the 1877 Epsom Derby winner Silvio (the 4/9 favourite) in the Gold Vase over two miles. Two days later, he competed in the Gold Cup, at that time regarded as the most important and prestigious weight-for-age race of the year. The field included two of the previous season's leading Classic performers: the French-trained Insulaire, who had won the Prix du Jockey Club and finished second in both The Derby and the Grand Prix; and Jannette, who had won The Oaks and defeated the colts, including Insulaire, in the St Leger. Isonomy was held up in the early stages before moving up to contest the lead as the field entered the straight. As Isonomy accelerated only Insulaire attempted to match him, and the two pulled well clear of the rest. In the closing stages Isonomy drew away to beat the French colt easily by two lengths "in a canter".

On 29 July, Isonomy ran in the Goodwood Cup, in which he was asked to concede thirteen pounds to Parole. An outsider named The Bear set off in front and at one stage opened up a lead of two hundred yards. Isonomy finally caught up with the front-runner in the straight and pulled away in the closing stages to win easily by three lengths, with Parole third A few days later on 6 August he was sent to Brighton Racecourse for the two-mile Brighton Cup, in which he carried 136 pounds and started at odds of 1/10 against three opponents. After settling in third place he moved into the lead in the straight and went three lengths clear, before being eased down in the closing stages to record a three-quarter-length win over Paul's Cray. Isonomy was then sent north for the Ebor Handicap at York on 27 August, for which he was made 8/11 favourite. Despite the very difficult conditions ("mud and water flying in all directions"), and conceding at least thirty pounds to his opponents, he won impressively by eight lengths.

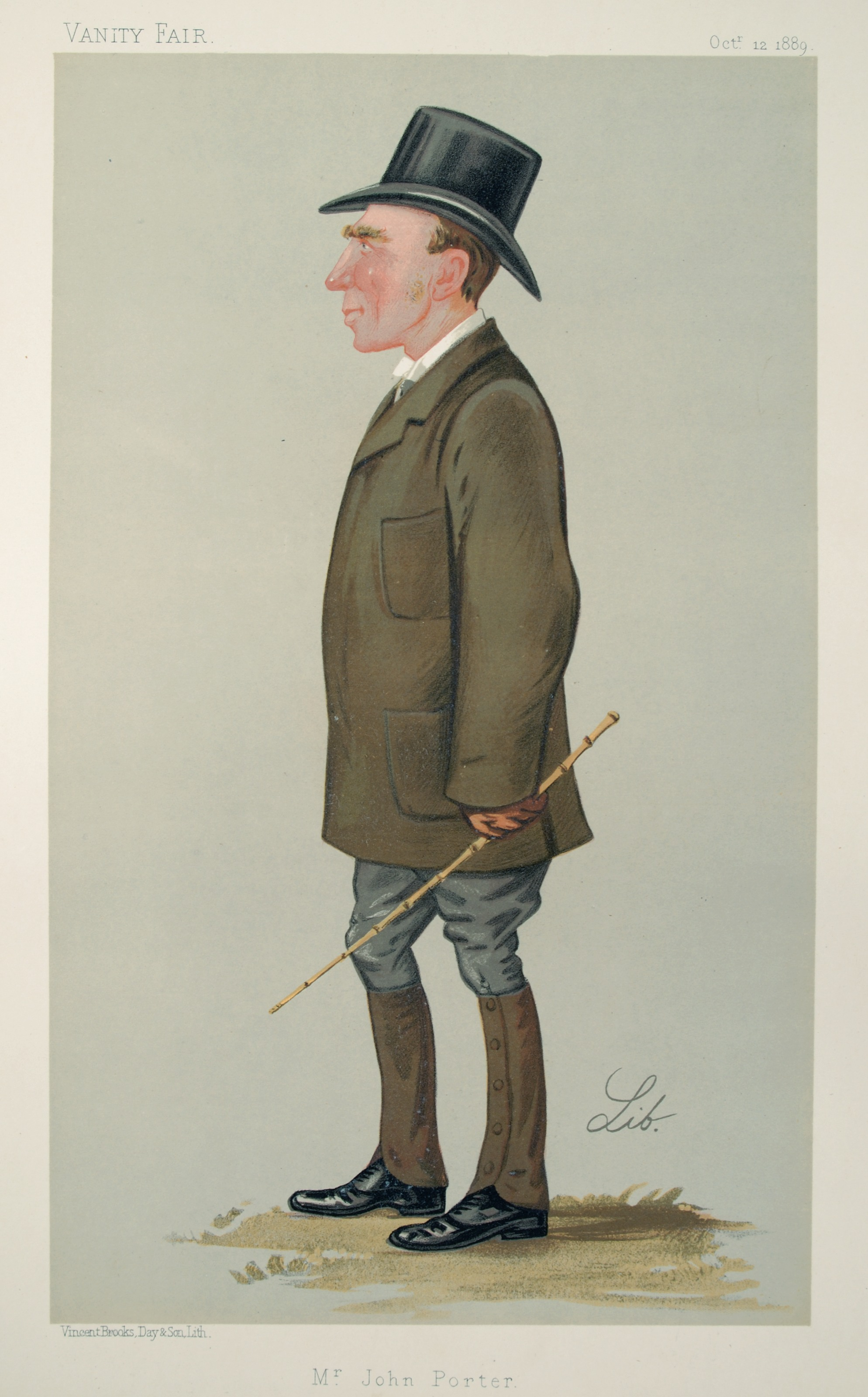
John Porter, Isonomy's trainer

In September he attempted to become the first horse to complete the stayers' Triple Crown in the Doncaster Cup, although there was some disappointment that the undefeated Hungarian mare Kincsem was ruled out of the race by injury. In a rough race he defeated the filly Jannette, despite being badly cut by the spurs of the runner-up's jockey, Fred Archer when he moved up to challenge for the lead along the rails. The Duke of Portland said of Isonomy's performance marked him as "one of the best and gamest horses that ever ran". The Gold Cup-Goodwood Cup-Doncaster Cup treble was not completed again until Alycidon did so in 1949.

On his final start of the year he carried top weight in the Cesarewitch Handicap at Newmarket on 7 October. In this race, however, he was not expected to win, and seems to have been entered mainly to provide assistance to his owner's other runner Westbourne. He was not even included in the betting for the race. The plan failed, as Westbourne finished second to Chippendale, with Isonomy in fourth.

=== 1880: five-year-old season ===
Isonomy ran twice as a five-year-old and won both his races. On 19 May he carried 138 pounds in the Manchester Cup over one mile five furlongs. He was set to give large amounts of weight to many top-class horses and was not among the favourites for the race, starting at odds of 100/6. In what was described as "one of the most wonderful performances that has been recorded for many years" he won the race from The Abbot, a top-class three-year-old who had recently finished third in the 2000 Guineas and to whom he was conceding 46 pounds. Gretton was reported to have won £25,000 in bets on the race.

At Royal Ascot his only rivals for the Gold Cup were the Cesarewitch winner Chippendale and the 1879 Prix du Jockey Club winner Zut. Chippendale made the running and was still leading by a length at the start of the straight, and Cannon was looking uneasy on the favourite. In the closing stages, however, Isonomy took control of the race and finished a "gallant and easy" winner by a length. Shortly after the race it was announced that Isonomy would probably not run again in 1880, although there were hopes that he would return as a six-year-old.

In early 1881, Gretton reportedly turned down an offer of £25,000 for Isonomy.

== Assessment ==
In May 1886 The Sporting Times carried out a poll of one hundred racing experts to create a ranking of the best British racehorses of the 19th century. Isonomy was ranked third, having been placed in the top ten by 62 of the contributors. In a related poll, the electors were asked to choose the single greatest horse they had ever seen. In this poll, Isonomy finished second, one vote behind Gladiateur.

The English Illustrated Magazine called Isonomy “one of the most remarkable racehorses of the century”. By the time of his second Gold Cup he was being described as "undoubtedly the best horse of late times" and as "one of the grandest and apparently most invincible Cup horses that ever trod the turf." The Sportsman called him "the best horse ever bred in England." John Porter, who trained the winners of twenty-three classics, including three Triple Crowns, regarded Isonomy as the best horse he ever trained.

== Contemporary culture ==
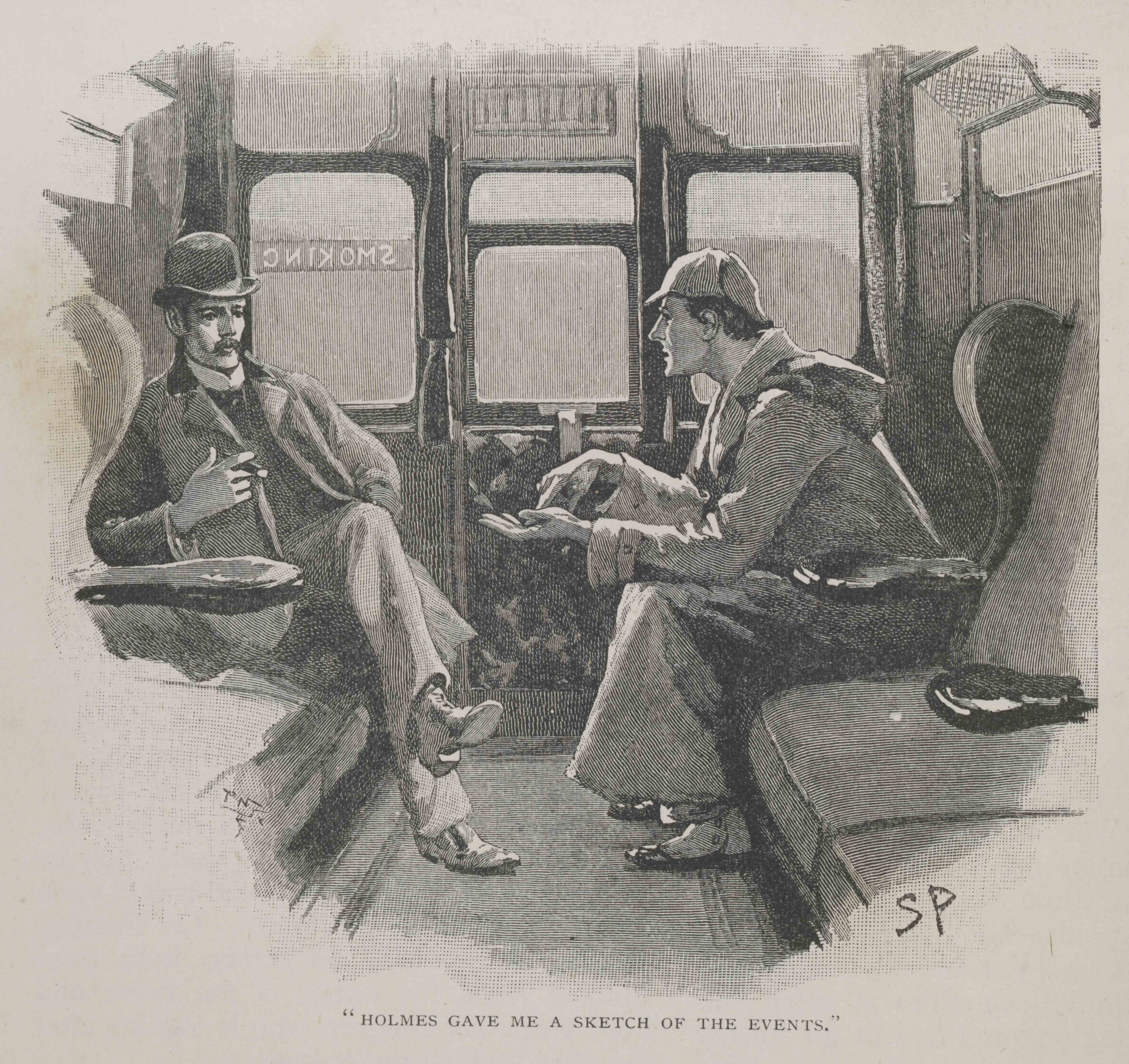
"Silver Blaze... is from Isonomy stock..."

Isonomy found his way into contemporary literature in the 1892 short story "The Adventure of Silver Blaze" by Arthur Conan Doyle. The story concerns the kidnapping of a celebrated racehorse and the mysterious death of its trainer. When explaining the horse's value to Dr. Watson, Sherlock Holmes says that “Silver Blaze... is from Isonomy stock, and holds as brilliant a record as his famous ancestor.”

== Stud career ==
Isonomy was retired to Bonehill Paddock stud near Tamworth at the end of the 1880 season, but had little early success, siring only fifteen foals in two years. After Gretton's death he was sold at auction to William Stirling-Crawfurd, the husband of the Duchess of Montrose, in January 1883 for £10,000. Isonomy was sent to the Duchess's Sefton Stud, and after a weight-reduction programme, he resumed his stud career with greater success. Although he was never Champion sire he proved to be a successful stallion, siring two Triple Crown winners in Isinglass and Common. Among his other successes were the outstanding filly Seabreeze and the influential sire Gallinule. Isonomy developed heart trouble and died in April 1891.

== Sire line tree ==
Descendants of Isonomy (click to show)
- Isonomy
  - Isobar
    - Destillateur
    - Iceland
  - Bonnet Rouge
  - Eiridspord
    - Challenger
    - Hymettus
    - Ranfurly
  - Gallinule
    - Ball Coote
    - Gazetteer
    - Lesterlin
      - Duke Of Leinster
      - Glenesky
        - Gleneskaki
    - Port Marnock
    - Gulsalberk
    - General Peace
      - Redmond
        - Red Park
    - Dunamase
    - Noble Howard
    - Wildfowler
      - Llangibby
        - Land Of Song
        - Lanius (1911)
        - Cromdale
        - Dionysos
        - Lanius (1915)
      - Mayfowl
      - Twenty-Third
      - Wild Bouquet
    - Oppressor
    - Travelling Lad
      - Ally Sloper
    - Steinort
    - Carrigavalla
    - Good Morning
    - Abt Vogler
    - Fariman
      - Armant
    - Christian De Wet
    - Glenamoy
    - Kosmos Bey
    - Penury
    - Santry
      - Dealer
      - Jingling Geordie
      - Sandro
      - Sanquhar
      - Sanguine
    - Galangal
    - The Gull
      - The Guller
    - Gala Wreath
    - Hammurabi
      - Meridian
    - Poussin
    - Rocketter
    - Sarcelle
    - Zadkiel
    - All Black
      - Bunting
      - Egypt
      - Pershore
      - Kickoff
      - All Sunshine
      - Nigger Minstrel
        - Peter Jackson
      - Balmerino
    - Goldminer
      - Goldcourt
        - Copper Court
        - Golden Miller
        - Golden Jack
    - Hermes
    - Slieve Gallion
      - Palatin
      - Onkel Ludwig
      - Pasztorfiu
      - Oktondi
      - Montalto
    - Weathercock
    - Petrillo
      - Portrush
    - Rodney
    - White Eagle
      - Let Fly
      - Durazzo
      - Bird Of Prey
      - Erne
      - Eagle's Pride
    - Arc De Triumphe
    - Cock-A-Hoop
    - Glasgerion
      - Carados
      - Fohanaun
    - Phaleron
    - Admiral Hawk
    - Galatine
    - Powhatan
    - Chilperic
    - Absolute
    - Gallon
      - Emigrant
    - Winstanley
    - Great Sport
      - Judge Fuller
    - L'Oiseau Lyre
    - Night Hawk
      - Zaporozec
    - Francinet
    - Torloisk
  - Isosceles
    - St Luke
  - Ruler
    - Aschabad
    - Hungarian
    - Mortimer
    - Lancelot
    - Atilla
    - Pickwick
      - Gajda
      - Petrarka
    - Homard
    - Smike
    - No Rule
      - Don Juan
        - Dago
    - Despot
    - Culloden
    - Trafalgar
    - Uzda
  - Clan Chattan
  - Fortunio
    - Delaunay
      - Quai De Fleurs
  - Galaor
    - Matador
    - Proponent
    - Weathercock
    - Capo Gallo
      - Unak
    - Apollo
    - Nesze
    - Firlej
  - Ingram
  - Queen's Counsel
  - Satiety
    - Piety
    - Silver Fox
      - The Policeman
  - Janissary
    - Jeddah
  - Common
    - Martin
    - Osbech
    - Uncommon
      - Czar
    - Cottager
    - Charcot
    - Mushroom
      - Beaumont
        - Beausart
        - Beguin
        - Fremonto
        - Karamont
        - Samson
        - Cent Seize
  - Hermence
    - Hermis
      - Prince Hermis
    - Herman Whit
  - Islington
    - Kinley Mack
  - Le Noir
  - Pilgrim's Progress
    - Lieutenant Bill
    - Abundance
      - Kandos
    - Pilgrim's Rest
    - Demas
    - Bunyan
    - Signor
  - Bunbury
  - Fatherless
  - Grand Duke
  - Isinglass
    - Gallerte
    - Jacobite
    - Star Shoot
      - Beacon Light
      - Kentucky Beau
      - Uncle
        - Old Rosebud
        - Step Along
      - Great Heavens
      - Captain Ross
      - Colinet
      - Any Port
      - Bourbon Beau
      - Star Charter
      - Eyebrow
      - Magneto
      - Helios
      - Solar Star
      - Ivory Black
      - Star Master
        - Kildare
        - McCarthy
      - Stargazer
      - Audacious
        - Storm
        - Foolhardy
      - Sir Barton
      - Star Hampton
      - Georgie
      - Grey Lag
      - Hildur
        - Main Man
      - Arendal
    - Veles
      - Vexillum
    - Rising Glass
    - Azamat
    - Kilglass
    - Agar
    - Challenger
      - Gillamatong
    - John O'Gaunt
      - Cardinal Beaufort
      - Swynford
        - Hainault
        - Under Fire
        - March Along
        - Gauntley
        - Sirrah
        - Westward Ho
        - Blandford
        - Silurian
        - Stratford
        - Bold And Bad
        - Top Gallant
        - Gallardo
        - Sansovino
        - St Germans
        - Frilford
        - Lulli
        - Schiavoni
        - Verbius
        - Barbican
        - Lancegaye
        - Swift And Sure
        - Swinburne
        - Birthright
        - Bolingbroke
        - Strathlaven
        - Hartford
        - Lyme Regis
        - Pick Of The Circus
        - Royal Ford
        - Challenger
        - Iliad
      - Sobieski
      - Lancaster
      - Harry Of Hereford
        - Harrier
        - Chateaufort
      - Cressingham
      - Duke Humphrey
        - Prince Humphrey
      - Kennymore
        - Kersasos
      - Thurnham
      - Burne Jones
        - Cercingoli
        - Delfino
        - Black Watch
      - Duke Of Lancaster
      - Black Gauntlet
      - Spithead
    - Pam
      - Hare Hill
      - Sir Tredennes
    - Prince George
    - The Scribe
      - Lempriere
    - Atlas
    - Decanter
    - Pure Crystal
    - Admiral Crichton
    - Glasconbury
    - Wombwell
    - Baltinglass
    - Pure Gem
      - Parazit
    - Carpathian
      - Tarzan
      - Morgan
    - Ednam
    - Louviers
      - Landgraf
        - Hausfreund
        - Coran
        - Ferro
        - Oberwinter
        - Pelopidas
    - Marble Arch
      - Mullingar
      - Uncle Ned
    - Eye Glass
    - Moenus
    - Louvois
      - Parisian Diamond
      - Scapin
      - St Louis
        - Control
      - French Briar
      - Loufoque
      - Warminster
  - Prisoner
    - Antonio
      - Giru
  - Ravensbury
    - Belvoir
      - Kilbarry
    - Sandboy
    - Feather Bed
      - Lie-A-Bed
      - Knight Of Blyth
  - Bennitthorpe
  - Contract
    - Conby
  - Ivor
  - Son O'Mine
    - Querido
      - Amyntas
    - Herouval
    - Liao
    - Alvarez
      - Janus
    - Saint Ange
      - Harpocrate
  - Le Var
    - Outbreak
      - Civil War

== Pedigree ==
Pedigree of Isonomy (GB), bay stallion, 1875
Sire Sterling (GB) 1868	Oxford; 1857	Birdcatcher*	Sir Hercules*
Sire Sterling (GB) 1868	Oxford; 1857	Birdcatcher*	Guiccioli*
Sire Sterling (GB) 1868	Oxford; 1857	Honey Dear	Plenipotentiary
Sire Sterling (GB) 1868	Oxford; 1857	Honey Dear	My Dear
Sire Sterling (GB) 1868	Whisper; 1857	Flatcatcher	Touchstone
Sire Sterling (GB) 1868	Whisper; 1857	Flatcatcher	Decoy
Sire Sterling (GB) 1868	Whisper; 1857	Silence	Melbourne
Sire Sterling (GB) 1868	Whisper; 1857	Silence	Secret
Dam Isola Bella (GB) 1868	Stockwell; 1849	The Baron	Birdcatcher*
Dam Isola Bella (GB) 1868	Stockwell; 1849	The Baron	Echidna
Dam Isola Bella (GB) 1868	Stockwell; 1849	Pocahontas	Glencoe
Dam Isola Bella (GB) 1868	Stockwell; 1849	Pocahontas	Marpessa
Dam Isola Bella (GB) 1868	Isloine; 1860	Ethelbert	Faugh-a-Ballagh*
Dam Isola Bella (GB) 1868	Isloine; 1860	Ethelbert	Espoir
Dam Isola Bella (GB) 1868	Isloine; 1860	Bassishaw	The Prime Warden
Dam Isola Bella (GB) 1868	Isloine; 1860	Bassishaw	Miss Whinney* (Family: 19-a)

* Isonomy is inbred 3S x 4D to the stallion Birdcatcher, meaning that he appears third generation on the sire side of his pedigree, and fourth generation on the dam side of his pedigree.

* Isonomy is inbred 4S x 5D x 5D x 5D to the stallion Sir Hercules, meaning that he appears fourth generation once on the sire side of his pedigree, and fifth generation thrice (via Birdcatcher, Faugh-a-Ballagh, and Miss Whinney) on the dam side of his pedigree.

* Isonomy is inbred 4S x 5D x 5D x 5D to the mare Guiccioli, meaning that she appears fourth generation once on the sire side of his pedigree, and fifth generation thrice (via Birdcatcher, Faugh-a-Ballagh, and Miss Whinney) on the dam side of his pedigree.

== See also ==
- List of racehorses
