= Daniel O'Rourke (horse) =

British-bred Thoroughbred racehorse

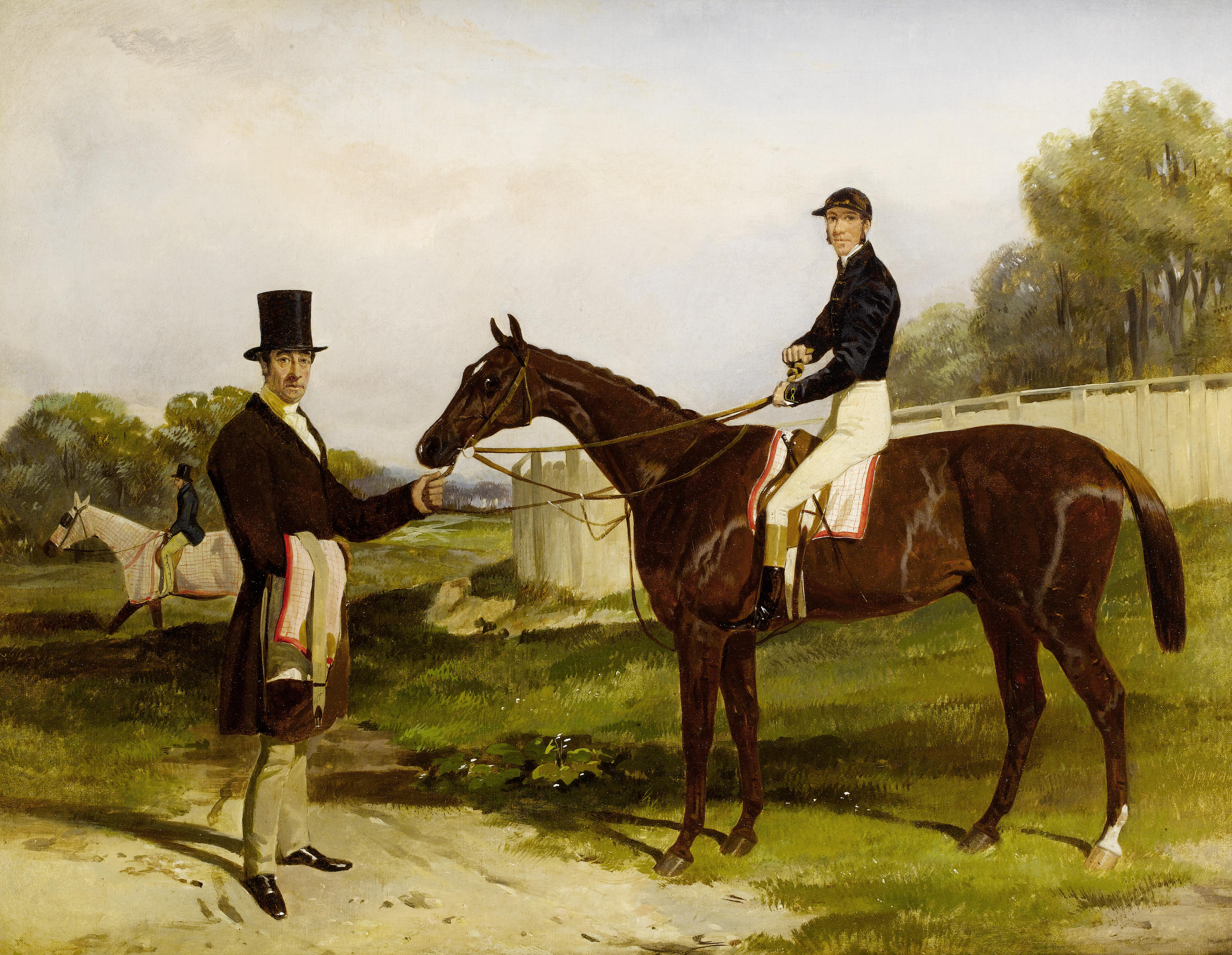
- Daniel O'Rourke, with jockey Frank Butler and owner John Bowes. Painting by Harry Hall
- Sire: Birdcatcher
- Grandsire: Sir Hercules
- Dam: Forget Me Not
- Damsire: Hetman Platoff
- Sex: Stallion
- Foaled: 1849
- Country: United Kingdom
- Colour: Brown
- Owner: John Bowes
- Trainer: John Scott
- Record: 10:2-2-3

Major wins
- Epsom Derby (1852); St James's Palace Stakes (1852)

Daniel O'Rourke (1849 – after 1869) was a British Thoroughbred racehorse and sire. In a career that lasted from September 1851 to July 1853 he ran eleven times and won two races. In the summer of 1852, he proved himself one of the best British colts of his generation, winning the Derby at Epsom and the St James's Palace Stakes. Daniel O'Rourke came into the Derby as a maiden and won as an unconsidered outsider on heavy ground. He was one of the smallest Thoroughbreds to win a notable race, being technically a pony under some definitions of the term.

== Background ==
Daniel O'Rourke was a compact, powerfully-built chestnut colt with a narrow white stripe and one white foot. He was bred by his owner John Bowes at Streatlam Castle, County Durham. At the peak of his success in 1852, Daniel O'Rourke was measured at 14.2 hands high, although as a stallion he grew to be over 15 hands. He was sired by Birdcatcher, a successful Irish racehorse who became an important and influential stallion. His progeny included the Classic winners Knight of St George, Warlock, The Baron (a leading sire) and Manganese. He was Champion sire in 1852 and 1856. Daniel O'Rourke was the first foal of the mare Forget Me Not, who went on to produce five other winners.

Bowes sent the colt into training with John Scott who trained forty classic winners from his base at Malton, North Yorkshire.

Daniel O'Rourke was named after a character in an Irish fairy tale who was carried to the moon by an eagle: his sire was often known as "Irish Birdcatcher".

== Racing career ==
=== 1851: two-year-old season ===
Daniel O'Rourke made his debut on 16 September in one of the season's most important two-year-old races, the £775 Champagne Stakes at Doncaster in which he finished second, beaten by half a length by Augur. On his only other start in 1851 he ran in the £710 Criterion Stakes at Newmarket on 27 October. He started 7/4 favourite but finished fifth of the six runners behind the filly Red Hind.

=== 1852: three-year-old season ===
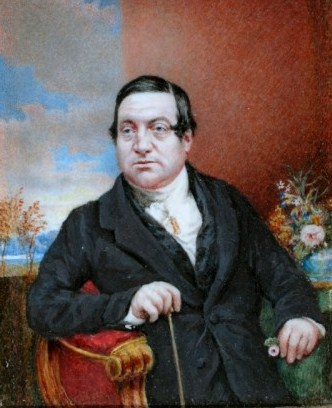
Daniel O'Rourke's Derby was one of forty classic wins for John Scott

Daniel O'Rourke made his seasonal reappearance in the 2000 Guineas at Newmarket for which he was strongly fancied, starting second favourite at odds of 3/1. He finished fifth of the nine runners behind Stockwell, and was beaten by "a long way".

At Epsom on 26 May Daniel O'Rourke started a 25/1 outsider for the Derby with Little Harry starting favourite ahead of Hobbie Noble. According to the Daily News, which compiled a list of all the predictions and "prophecies" for the race for weeks in advance, none of the press commentators or experts mentioned Daniel O'Rourke as a potential winner. The race, which offered a first prize of £5,050 attracted the customary huge crowd, despite the cold weather and heavy rain which made the ground unusually soft and "sticky". There were several false starts caused partly by the crowd encroaching onto the course, but the twenty-seven runners eventually got under way, with Little Harry leading in the early stages and Daniel O'Rourke, ridden by Frank Butler well back in the field. Butler moved Daniel O'Rourke steadily closer, but he was still at least four lengths behind the leaders as they turned into the straight. The closing stages of the race were difficult to follow, with horses stretched across the entire width of the track: Daniel O'Rourke steadily wore down Barbarian on the stands side, while Chief Baron Nicholson and Hobbie Noble raced together against the opposite rail. Daniel O'Rourke, staying the distance well on the tiring ground, crossed the line a "short half length" ahead of Barbarian, with a length back to Chief Baron Nicholson, who beat Hobbie Noble by a head for third place. Stockwell, whose training had been disrupted by a gumboil and who was badly hampered in the race, finished unplaced. The winning time of 3:02 was the slowest recorded up to that time: Ellington broke his "record" by winning in 3:04 four years later.

Daniel O'Rourke was then sent to Royal Ascot where he won the St James's Palace Stakes, beating Alcoran "cleverly" by a length, despite suffering an injury to his hip in the horse-box on the way to the course. As at Epsom, he seemed particularly well-suited by the heavy ground. The experience of running injured however, "spoilt" the colt's temperament and he became increasing difficult to train. In the Ebor St Leger at York in August he started at 2/5 against his only rival, Frantic. Although the descriptions of the race were conflicting as to the details, all reports agreed that Frantic beat Daniel O'Rourke easily.

In September he was sent to Doncaster for the St Leger for which he was made 5/2 second favourite behind Stockwell (7/4) in a field of six. He was never able to reach the leaders and finished a remote third as Stockwell won easily by ten lengths. At Newmarket on 29 September he finished third of the six runners in the Triennial Stakes behind Hobbie Noble.

=== 1853: four-year-old season ===
As a four-year-old, Daniel O'Rourke ran twice, both at Goodwood's summer meeting. On 27 July he started 4/5 favourite for a Bentinck Memorial Stakes but ran very poorly behind Poodle and was pulled up in the closing stages although he crossed the line for third place ahead of Hobbie Noble, who had also been eased down to a walk. The following day he reappeared in the ten furlong Chesterfield Cup and finished unplaced behind Nabob.

== Assessment ==
Daniel O'Rourke's Derby win was commonly regarded as a "fluke", and he was certainly inferior to Stockwell, who beat him on their three other meetings. He was also reported to be definitely inferior to his stable companion, The Oaks winner Songstress.

== Stud career ==
At the end of his racing career, Daniel O'Rourke was sold to the leading breeder Sir Tatton Sykes and was retired to stand at his stud at Sledmere in Yorkshire. Daniel O'Rourke was not a great success as a stallion in England and was sold in 1861 for 800 guineas. He was exported to Austria-Hungary where he was based for the rest of his life at the Imperial Stud at Kisber.

== Sire line tree ==
- Daniel O'Rourke
  - Sledmere
    - Daniel O'Rourke
  - Dalby
  - Ladykirk
    - Haricot

== Pedigree ==
Pedigree of Daniel O'Rourke (GB), chestnut stallion, 1849
Sire Birdcatcher (IRE) 1833	Sir Hercules; 1826	Whalebone	Waxy
Sire Birdcatcher (IRE) 1833	Sir Hercules; 1826	Whalebone	Penelope
Sire Birdcatcher (IRE) 1833	Sir Hercules; 1826	Peri	Wanderer
Sire Birdcatcher (IRE) 1833	Sir Hercules; 1826	Peri	Thalestris
Sire Birdcatcher (IRE) 1833	Guiccioli; 1823	Bob Booty	Chanticleer
Sire Birdcatcher (IRE) 1833	Guiccioli; 1823	Bob Booty	Ierne
Sire Birdcatcher (IRE) 1833	Guiccioli; 1823	Flight	Escape
Sire Birdcatcher (IRE) 1833	Guiccioli; 1823	Flight	Young Heroine
Dam Forget Me Not (GB) 1843	Hetman Platoff; 1836	Brutandorf	Blacklock
Dam Forget Me Not (GB) 1843	Hetman Platoff; 1836	Brutandorf	Mandane
Dam Forget Me Not (GB) 1843	Hetman Platoff; 1836	Comus mare	Comus
Dam Forget Me Not (GB) 1843	Hetman Platoff; 1836	Comus mare	Marciana
Dam Forget Me Not (GB) 1843	Oblivion; 1831	Jerry	Smolensko
Dam Forget Me Not (GB) 1843	Oblivion; 1831	Jerry	Louisa
Dam Forget Me Not (GB) 1843	Oblivion; 1831	Remembrance	Sir Solomon
Dam Forget Me Not (GB) 1843	Oblivion; 1831	Remembrance	Queen Mab (Family:9-b)
