= Birdcatcher (horse) =

Irish-bred Thoroughbred racehorse

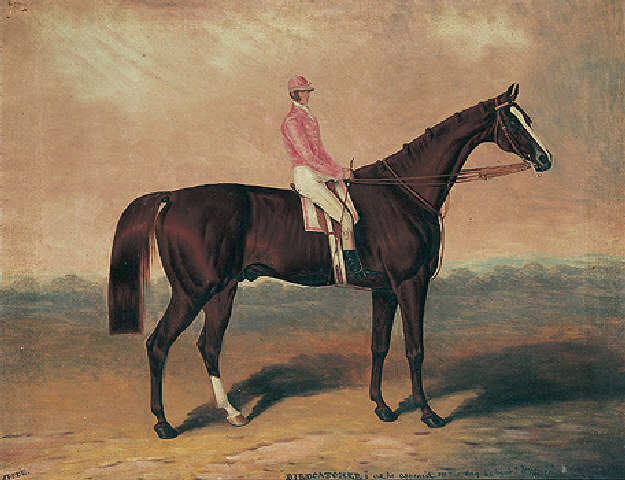
- Birdcatcher with jockey (1858), painted by Samuel Spode
- Sire: Sir Hercules
- Grandsire: Whalebone
- Dam: Guiccioli
- Damsire: Bob Booty
- Sex: Stallion
- Foaled: 1833
- Died: 1860 (aged 26–27)
- Country: Ireland
- Colour: Dark Chestnut
- Breeder: Mr. Hunt, Ireland
- Owner: William Disney
- Record: 15 starts, 7 wins
- Last updated on 15 May 2009

Birdcatcher (1833–1860), or Irish Birdcatcher, was a Thoroughbred racehorse and a leading sire.

== Breeding ==
Foaled in 1833 at the Brownstown Stud, in Ireland, Birdcatcher was by the Irish Thoroughbred stallion Sir Hercules, who lost only once, in the St Leger Stakes in 1829. Birdcatcher's dam, Guiccioli, who had a successful career as a racehorse, foaled the chestnut colt when she was 10. She was also the granddam of another well-known racehorse, Selim, and dam to a full-brother of Birdcatcher, Faugh-a-Ballagh, who in winning the St Leger in 1844 became the first Irish-bred horse to win an English classic.

== Description ==
Birdcatcher was said to have been small, only 15.3 hh, but he had an expressive head, a well-arched neck, and nicely sloping shoulder. His back was short and compact, his loin was deep, and his hindquarters were strong and muscular. His forearms and thighs were large and strong, and attached to fine, light legs. He had an elastic stride that no doubt helped him to win as many races as he did.

Birdcatcher had a large star and narrow blaze, white halfway up to the hock on the left hind. He also had ticking, or white hairs scattered throughout his flanks and at the base of the tail. He passed this trait onto many offspring, including Daniel O'Rourke, so often that the marking came to be called to Birdcatcher ticks. This marking differs from the small white spots known as Birdcatcher spots, and from the dark spots called Bend-Or spots.

== Racing career ==
William Disney bought the colt, and raced him once as a 2-year-old before beginning seriously as a three-year-old. The young Thoroughbred raced only at Curragh throughout his career. He broke his maiden at the Madrid Stakes, and then won the Milltown Stakes and fourteen-furlong Peel Stakes, and came second in the ten-furlong Wellington Stakes. His four-year-old career was also quite impressive, with a win in the Kildare and Wellington Stakes (where he walked over the finish line). He finished second after Harkaway in the Northumberland Handicap. In his final race, the Doris Stakes, Birdcatcher was unplaced.

The chestnut colt ended his career with 15 starts and 7 wins, before the horse went on to have a successful breeding career.

=== Race record ===
Two-year-old

- Paget Stakes at the Curragh, unplaced

Three-year-old ~raced exclusively at the Curragh

- Madrid Stakes: won, beating Maria (b.f. by Sir Hercules), Langford (br.c. by Sir Hercules), Quicksilver (b.c. by Memnon), and five other entries
- Miltown Stakes: won, beating Cushneiche (ch.c. by Roller)
- Wellington Stakes: came 2nd, after Maria, beating Whim (gr.f. by Drone), and eight others
- Challenge Stakes: 2nd, after Whim, beating Maria
- November Mulgrave Handicap: 3rd, after winner Water Witch (bl.f. by Sir Hercules) and Blackfoot (b.c. by Young Blacklock), beating Fusileer (ch.c. by The Colonel), Whim, and three other entries
- October Mulgrave Handicap: unplaced, won by Langford followed by Whim

Four-year-old ~raced exclusively at the Curragh

- Kildare Stakes: won, beating Thump (b.c. Humphrey Clinker), Aigirio (gr.c. Roller), Quicksilver, and two others
- King's Plate: Croughpatrick (br.c. Blacklock) and five others
- Wellington Stakes: won (walked over)
- April Challenge Stakes: 2nd, after Blackfoot, beat four others
- King's Plate: 2nd to Freney
- King's Plate: 3rd, after winner Harkaway, and Gipsy (bl.f. Sir Hercules)
- September Challenge Stakes: 3rd, after winner Mercury (gr.c. Drone), and Austerlitz (br.c. Napoleon)
- Wellington Stakes: unplaced, won by Harkaway
- Doris Stakes: unplaced, won by Maria

== Stud record ==
The stallion retired to stud at his place of foaling, Brownstown, beginning his breeding career as a five-year-old in 1838. Birdcatcher's first crop of foals did well, and he was moved to Barrow's Paddock in Newmarket for 1846 and 1847, before he was leased for 1848 and 1849 to Easby Abbey in Yorkshire. The stallion then returned home to Brownstown for 1850, and was sent back to England for the 1852 season, and returned home to Ireland for the 1859 season.

Birdcatcher's English offspring did well, and earned him the Champion Sire title for 1852 and 1856. He was among the top sires 15 times during his breeding career. Birdcatcher was the first Irish-bred stallion to sire winners of English classic races, including seven offspring accounting for three St. Leger wins, two One Thousand Guineas wins, and a win at the Derby and the Oaks. Birdcatcher also founded two male lines, one with Oxford, and another with The Baron, from whom most Thoroughbreds descend today.

Birdcatcher sired:

| Foaled | Name | Sex | Major Wins/Achievements |
|---|---|---|---|
| 1841 | Mickey Free | Stallion | |
| 1842 | The Baron | Stallion | St Leger Stakes. Very successful sire. |
| 1843 | Chanticleer | Stallion | Doncaster Cup |
| 1843 | Foninnualla | Mare | Dam of Mincepie (won the Epsom Oaks) |
| 1848 | Marquis | Stallion | |
| 1849 | Bird on the Wing | Mare | 2nd in the Epsom Oaks |
| 1849 | Daniel O'Rourke | Stallion | Epsom Derby (1852) |
| 1849 | Mrs Ridgway | Mare | |
| 1849 | Partlet | Mare | Dam of Jeune Premier (Prix de Diane) |
| 1849 | Songstress | Mare | Epsom Oaks (1852) |
| 1850 | England's Beauty | Mare | Dam of Kingston (a good sire in Australia) |
| 1850 | Miss Agnes | Mare | |
| 1851 | Knight of St. George | Stallion | St Leger Stakes (1854) |
| 1852 | Habena | Mare | 1000 Guineas Stakes (1855) |
| 1853 | Manganese | Mare | 1000 Guineas Stakes (1856) |
| 1853 | Warlock | Stallion | St Leger Stakes (1856) |
| 1854 | Ayacanora | Mare | Dam of Talk O' The Hill (a good sire in Australia) |
| 1854 | Saunterer | Stallion | Goodwood Cup |
| 1856 | Red Eagle | Stallion | |
| 1857 | Lady Trespass | Mare | Park Hill Stakes |
| 1857 | Oxford | Stallion | |

== The death of Birdcatcher ==
Despite his success as a sire Birdcatcher met with an undeserved execution after he was unable to cover a mare.

His death was accounted by Patrick Connolly. "Among the mares sent to the son of Sir Hercules that year was Mr. Michael Dunne's Queen Bee. She was a mare of good size, and when Birdcatcher attempted to serve her, he failed to do so. Mr. Disney, who owned the stallion, thereupon decided that he should no longer survive. At once a messenger was dispatched to the local police station with orders to bring back with him a constable with a loaded gun, as a horse was required to be destroyed. The police officer – his name was Preston – reported himself to Mr. Disney, who gave the necessary directions for the destruction of Birdcatcher. The horse was placed on the brink of a sandpit situated on the flat opposite Conyngham Lodge, Curragh; without any ceremony he was shot and his carcass tumbled into the pit. Thus ended the career of a good racehorse and a mighty sultan at the age of twenty-seven years. His head was afterwards presented to the Royal College of Veterinary Surgeons, Dublin."

== Sire line tree ==
Descendants of Birdcatcher (click to show)
- Birdcatcher
  - Ballinkeele
  - Mickey Free
    - Fenian
    - Milesian
  - King Fisher
  - The Baron
    - Chief Baron Nicholson
    - Stockwell
      - St Albans
        - Julius
        - Springfield
      - Thunderbolt
        - Vulcan
        - Thunder
        - Jupiter Tonans
        - Krakatoa
      - Asteroid
      - Ace Of Clubs
        - Wollomai
      - Citadel
        - Glenelg
      - The Marquis
        - Newminster
      - Grimston
        - Adonis
        - Bauernfanger
      - Blair Athol
        - Ethus
        - Jock Of Oran
        - Prince Charlie
        - Andred
        - St Albans
        - Stonehenge
        - Ecossais
        - Claremont
        - Craig Millar
        - Clanronald
        - Glendale
        - Covenanter
        - Rob Roy
        - Silvio
        - The Rover
        - Baliol
      - Bothwell
      - Breadalbane
        - The Ill-Used
        - Blairgowrie
      - Broomielaw
        - Trent
      - Caterer
      - Knowsley
      - Lord Ronald
        - Master Kildare
      - The Duke
        - Bertram
      - Lord Lyon
        - Cour de Lion
        - Poursuivant
        - Speedwell
        - Touchet
        - Subduer
        - Zadig
        - Minting
      - Monarch Of The Glen
        - Porridge
      - Savernake
        - Hochstapler
        - Wagehals
        - Paul
        - Alpenstock
        - Donnerkeil
        - Waidmannsheil
        - Wildschutz
        - Brocken
        - Harzburg
        - C-Dur
        - Rauberhauptmann
        - Radelsfuhrer
        - Bandit
        - Nickel
        - Raubgraf
        - Wickinger
        - Reichskanzler
      - Historian
      - Uncas
        - Ingomar
        - Wild Cherry
        - Redpath
        - Too Good
        - Warspite
      - Rustic
      - Countryman
        - The Assyrian
      - Belladrum
      - Doncaster
        - Bend Or
        - Muncaster
        - Cambusmore
        - Rossington
        - Sir Reuben
      - Gang Forward
        - Guesswork
        - Remus
        - Chetwynd
    - Rataplan
      - Knutsford
      - Kettledrum
        - Cymbal
        - Trombone
      - Rapparee
      - The Miner
        - Controversy
      - Elland
        - Pageant
      - Blinkhoolie
        - Wisdom
        - The Gift
      - The Drummer
      - Dalnacardoch
      - Drummond
      - Ben Battle
        - Bendigo
        - Man Of War
        - Spahi
        - Clarion
        - Ambush
      - Austerlitz
    - Remunerateur
    - Isolier
    - Fort-a-Bras
    - Tonnerre des Indes
    - Zouave
      - Glaieul
      - Tiralleur
      - Avant Garde
      - Enfant de Troupe
    - Costa
    - Baronella
  - Bryan O'Linn
  - Caurouch
  - Chanticleer
    - Vengeance
    - Cock Robin
  - Marquis
    - Blood Royal
  - Rory O'More
  - Augur
  - Daniel O'Rourke
    - Sledmere
      - Daniel O'Rourke
    - Dalby
    - Ladykirk
      - Haricot
  - Womersley
    - Amati
    - Black Tommy
    - Condrington
    - General Willams
      - Holderness
    - St Giles
      - Giles The First
        - Prince Giles
        - Aaron
          - Kiralyne
        - Dictator
          - Gomba
            - San Genarro
      - Wild Huntsman
    - Marignon
      - Le Petit Caporal
        - Saint James
    - Provacateur
  - Lord Fauconberg
    - Royal Oak Day
    - Rama
  - Bandy
  - Gamekeeper
  - Grey Plover
    - Sir Robert Peel
    - Golden Plover
  - Knight Of St George
    - Dan O'Connell
      - The Liberator
    - Knight Of St Patrick
      - Moslem
    - Melbourne Jr
      - Bazil
      - Incommode
      - Malvern
    - Knighthood
  - Papageno
    - Master George
  - Warlock
    - Vaucresson
    - War
    - Tynedale
      - Border Minstrel
        - Floreal
      - Riversdale
  - Saunterer
    - Digby Grand
      - Tartar
    - Saunterer
    - Regal
  - Red Eagle
  - Oxford
    - The Student
    - Oxonian
    - Blenheim
    - Sterling
      - Isonomy
        - Isobar
        - Bonnet Rouge
        - Eiridspord
        - Gallinule
        - Isosceles
        - Ruler
        - Clan Chattan
        - Fortunio
        - Galaor
        - Ingram
        - Queen's Counsel
        - Satiety
        - Janissary
        - Common
        - Hermence
        - Islington
        - Le Noir
        - Pilgrim's Progress
        - Bunbury
        - Fatherless
        - Grand Duke
        - Isinglass
        - Prisoner
        - Ravensbury
        - Bennitthorpe
        - Contract
        - Ivor
        - Son O'Mine
        - Le Var
      - Sterlingworth
      - Beaudesert
        - Stiletto
        - El Amigo
        - Fulminante
        - De Beavoir
        - Finance
      - Discount
      - Fernandez
        - Miguel
        - Gonsalvo
        - Ferdinand
        - Foston
        - Wavelet's Pride
      - Geologist
        - Ellison
        - Caliche
        - Shancrotha
      - Play Actor
        - David Trot
      - Energy
        - Gouverneur
        - Reverend
        - Energique
        - Le Chesnay
        - Rueil
        - Falmouth
        - Marly
      - Keir
      - The Golden Farmer
      - Harvester
        - Harvest Feast
        - Thorax
        - Lulu
        - Kevely
      - Esterling
        - Lord Esterling
        - Koran
      - Metal
        - Blue Metal
        - Parsee
      - Paradox
        - Unicorne
        - Red Ensign
        - Alconbury
      - Atheling
        - Royal Emperor
        - Armeath
        - Dublin
        - Short Hose
        - Bryn Mawr
        - Alfar
      - Doubloon
        - Mortgage
        - Harvest Money
      - Silver
        - Harmonist
        - Vasquito
      - Stalwart
      - Cherry Ripe
        - Drogheda
        - Red Heart
        - Royal Cherry
        - Eulogy
        - Cerasus
        - Lord Rossmore
        - President Roosevelt
      - Enterprise
      - Top Gallant
        - Typhoon
        - Sydney Lucas
        - Japan
        - Migraine
        - The Minks
      - Loyalist
        - The Judge
        - Lissak
      - Enthusiast
        - Eager
        - Succoth
        - Lord Edward
        - Energetic
        - Glenapp
        - Bealderg
        - Meldhre
        - Lochryan
        - Roseate Dawn
        - Arranmore
      - Gold
        - King Gold
        - Aureus
        - Purser
      - Endurance
      - Paderewski
      - Encounter
      - Kingsley
    - Wilberforce
    - Nuneham
    - Playfair
    - Chandos
    - Standard
      - Hambledon

== Pedigree ==
Pedigree of Birdcatcher (IRE), chestnut stallion, 1833
| Sire Sir Hercules 1826 | Whalebone; 1807 | Waxy | Potoooooooo |
| Sire Sir Hercules 1826 | Whalebone; 1807 | Waxy | Maria |
| Sire Sir Hercules 1826 | Whalebone; 1807 | Penelope | Trumpator |
| Sire Sir Hercules 1826 | Whalebone; 1807 | Penelope | Prunella |
| Sire Sir Hercules 1826 | Peri; 1822 | Wanderer | Gohanna |
| Sire Sir Hercules 1826 | Peri; 1822 | Wanderer | Catherine* |
| Sire Sir Hercules 1826 | Peri; 1822 | Thalestris | Alexander |
| Sire Sir Hercules 1826 | Peri; 1822 | Thalestris | Rival |
| Dam Guiccioli 1823 | Bob Booty; 1804 | Chanticleer (1787) | Woodpecker* |
| Dam Guiccioli 1823 | Bob Booty; 1804 | Chanticleer (1787) | Chanticleer's dam |
| Dam Guiccioli 1823 | Bob Booty; 1804 | Ierne | Bagot* |
| Dam Guiccioli 1823 | Bob Booty; 1804 | Ierne | mare by Gamahoe |
| Dam Guiccioli 1823 | Flight; 1809 | Escape | Highflyer |
| Dam Guiccioli 1823 | Flight; 1809 | Escape | mare by Squirrel |
| Dam Guiccioli 1823 | Flight; 1809 | Young Heroine | Bagot* |
| Dam Guiccioli 1823 | Flight; 1809 | Young Heroine | Heroine (Family 11-d) |

* Birdcatcher is inbred 4D x 4D to the stallion Bagot, meaning that he appears fourth generation twice on the dam side of his pedigree.

* Birdcatcher is inbred 5S x 4D to the stallion Woodpecker, meaning that he appears fifth generation (via Catherine) on the sire side of his pedigree, and fourth generation on the dam side of his pedigree.
