= Daniel O'Rourke =

Daniel O'Rourke (or Dan or Danny) may refer to:

- Daniel O'Rourke (horse) (1849–?), British Thoroughbred racehorse and sire
- Daniel O'Rourke (politician) (died 1968), Irish politician and teacher
- Dan O'Rourke (ice hockey) (born 1972), ice hockey referee
- Daniel O'Rourke, a book by Thomas Crofton Croker
- Danny O'Rourke (soccer) (born 1983), American soccer player
