= Slieve Gallion (horse) =

British-bred Thoroughbred racehorse

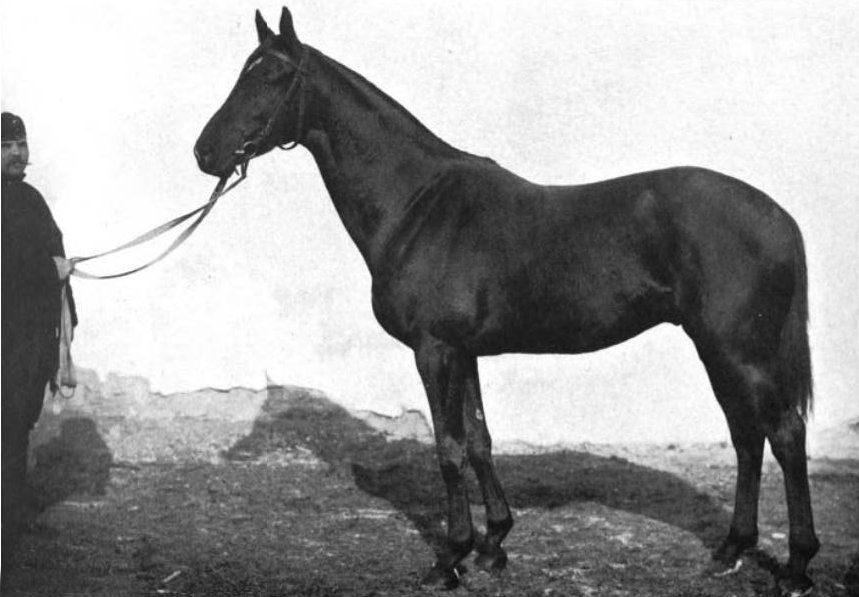
- Slieve Gallion in Hungary in 1912.
- Sire: Gallinule
- Grandsire: Isonomy
- Dam: Reclusion
- Damsire: St. Florian
- Sex: Stallion
- Foaled: 1904
- Country: United Kingdom
- Colour: Brown or Black
- Breeder: Henry Greer
- Owner: Henry Greer
- Trainer: Sam Darling
- Record: 8:6-1-1
- Earnings: £11,995

Major wins
- New Stakes (1906); Champagne Stakes (1906); Craven Stakes (1907); 2000 Guineas (1907); St. James's Palace Stakes (1907)

Slieve Gallion (1904–1926) was a British Thoroughbred racehorse and sire. In a career that lasted from May 1906 to June 1907 he ran eight times and won six races. He was one of the leading British two-year-olds of 1906 when his wins included the Champagne Stakes at Doncaster. The following spring he became a Classic winner by taking the 2000 Guineas but finished third when favourite for The Derby. After winning his only subsequent race he was sold and exported to stand as a stallion in Hungary.

== Background ==
Slieve Gallion's colour was controversial: he was officially described as a black horse, although his portrait suggests that he was a dark-coated bay, and some argued that he was an unusually dark chestnut. He was bred in England by the Irish breeder Henry Greer, who owned the colt during his racing career. Greer named the colt after a mountain in County Londonderry. He was sired by Greer's stallion Gallinule, a moderate racehorse who became a highly successful sire of winners, being the Leading sire in Great Britain and Ireland on two occasions. Greer sent the colt to be trained by Sam Darling at Beckhampton.

== Racing career ==
=== 1906: two-year-old season ===
Slieve Gallion began his racing career at Sandown Park in May where he won the Cobham Plate. He was immediately moved up in class and sent to Royal Ascot for the New Stakes, the race now known as the Norfolk Stakes. He won the race "very easily" to establish himself as one on the season's leading two-year-olds. A much anticipated meeting between Slieve Gallion and the year's other leading colt, Traquair, in the July Stakes at Newmarket did not come to pass when Greer's horse was withdrawn.

After a three-month break, Slieve Gallion returned to the racecourse to win the Champagne Stakes at Doncaster. On his final start of the season he ran in one of the year's most important two-year-old races, the Middle Park Stakes at Newmarket Racecourse. He was made favourite at odds of 1/4 in a field of five runners but was beaten after a "long and desperate struggle" by Eustace Loder's colt Galvani, with Traquair third. One explanation for his half-length defeat was that he was below his best form having suffered from dental problems in the build-up to the race. Although he had been beaten in his most important test, Slieve Gallion was widely regarded as the fastest two-year-old of the season, despite his "tearaway" racing style and tendency to carry his head at a high, awkward angle. Late in the season it was reported that Greer had turned down an offer of 18,000 guineas for his colt.

=== 1907: three-year-old season ===
Slieve Galion began his three-year-old season by winning the Craven Stakes at Newmarket in April. In the 2000 Guineas over the same course and distance two weeks later he started at odds of 4/11 against nine opponents. Ridden by Billy Higgs, he took an early lead and after being briefly challenged by Bezonian drew clear "in splendid style" to win easily by three lengths.

At Epsom on 5 June he was made 8/13 favourite for the one and a half mile Derby in a field of nine runners. Confidence was high, with one prominent correspondent claiming that Slieve Gallion only had to "escape accident" to win the Classic. Despite stamina not being considered one of Slieve Gallion's strengths, Higgs rode the colt positively, sending him to the front after half a mile. He continued to lead into the straight, but two furlongs from the finish he began to struggle and was overtaken by the Irish colt Orby. Slieve Gallion hung badly to the right as he tired and finished third, beaten two lengths and half a length by Orby and Wool Winder. Higgs and Sam Darling offered no excuses, admitting that their colt had been beaten on merit. Shortly after the Derby, Orby's owner "Boss" Croker challenged Greer to a match race between the colts for "a substantial sum" over any distance. The challenge was not accepted.

Two weeks after his defeat at Epsom, Slieve Gallion returned to the one mile distance for the St James's Palace Stakes at Royal Ascot which he won from two opponents at odds of 1/20. Slieve Gallion was then bought for 15,000 guineas by the Hungarian Mikos de Szemere. The colt was injured shortly afterwards and never raced again. His winnings of £7,705 made him the fifth most financially successful horse of the British season.

== Stud career ==
Slieve Gallion was exported by his new owner to stand as a stallion in Austria-Hungary. He made little impact as a sire of flat racers, but his progeny proved highly successful as steeplechasers. He was euthanized at the Kisber Stud in 1926.

== Pedigree ==
Pedigree of Slieve Gallion (GB), brown or black stallion, 1904
Sire Gallinule (GB) 1884	Isonomy; 1875	Sterling	Oxford
Sire Gallinule (GB) 1884	Isonomy; 1875	Sterling	Whisper
Sire Gallinule (GB) 1884	Isonomy; 1875	Isola Bella	Stockwell*
Sire Gallinule (GB) 1884	Isonomy; 1875	Isola Bella	Isoline
Sire Gallinule (GB) 1884	Moorhen; 1873	Hermit	Newminster
Sire Gallinule (GB) 1884	Moorhen; 1873	Hermit	Seclusion
Sire Gallinule (GB) 1884	Moorhen; 1873	sister to Ryshworth	Skirmisher
Sire Gallinule (GB) 1884	Moorhen; 1873	sister to Ryshworth	Vertumna*
Dam Reclusion (GB) 1898	St Florian; 1891	St Simon	Galopin*
Dam Reclusion (GB) 1898	St Florian; 1891	St Simon	St Angela
Dam Reclusion (GB) 1898	St Florian; 1891	Palmflower	The Palmer
Dam Reclusion (GB) 1898	St Florian; 1891	Palmflower	Jenny Diver
Dam Reclusion (GB) 1898	Penserosa; 1893	Fitz-James	The Scottish Chief
Dam Reclusion (GB) 1898	Penserosa; 1893	Fitz-James	Hawthorn Bloom
Dam Reclusion (GB) 1898	Penserosa; 1893	Allegra	Galopin*
Dam Reclusion (GB) 1898	Penserosa; 1893	Allegra	Feronia (Family:8-d)

* Slieve Gallion is inbred 4D x 4D to the stallion Galopin, meaning that he appears fourth generation twice on the dam side of his pedigree.

* Slieve Gallion is inbred 4S x 5S to the stallion Stockwell, meaning that he appears fourth generation and fifth generation generation (via Vertumna) on the sire side of his pedigree.
