= Matilda (horse) =

British-bred Thoroughbred racehorse

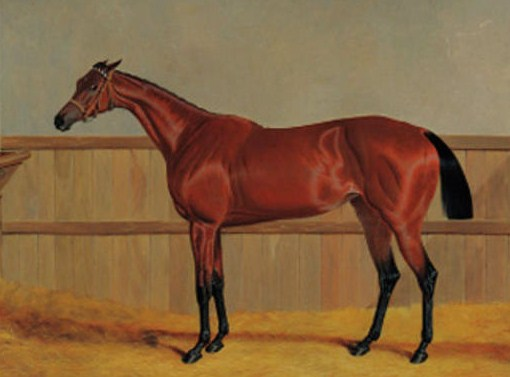
- Matilda, a bay racehorse with her groom in a loosebox (detail) by John Frederick Herring, Sr.
- Sire: Comus
- Grandsire: Sorcerer
- Dam: Juliana
- Damsire: Gohanna
- Sex: Mare
- Foaled: 1824
- Country: United Kingdom
- Colour: Bay
- Breeder: Edward Petre
- Owner: Edward Petre
- Trainer: John Scott
- Record: 9:4-2-0

Major wins
- St Leger Stakes (1827)

Matilda (1824–1846) was a British Thoroughbred racehorse and broodmare best known for winning the St Leger Stakes in 1827. In a racing career confined to racecourses in Yorkshire she ran nine times and won four races between August 1826 and October 1828. After winning three of her first four races she defeated the Derby winner Mameluke in a controversial race for the 1827 St Leger. She was retired from racing after four unsuccessful races in 1828 and became a broodmare.

== Background ==
Matilda was a "small, fidgety, temperamental" bay mare owned and bred by Edward Petre (1794–1848), a free-spending sportsman and gambler, who was a younger son of Robert Petre, 9th Baron Petre. Matilda was the seventh foal of Lord Egremont's mare Juliana, a daughter of Platina, the winner of the 1795 Epsom Oaks. Platina was a sister of Chestnut Skim, the female-line ancestor of Frederick, Election and The Merry Monarch. Matilda was sired by Comus, a descendant of the Godolphin Arabian who finished third in the 1812 Epsom Derby before becoming a successful sire of winners. Like the rest of Petre's horses, Matilda was trained by John Scott, who sent out the winners of 41 classics, from his Whitewall Stables at Malton in North Yorkshire.

== Racing career ==
=== 1826: two-year-old season ===
Matilda began her racing career on 9 August 1826 in a sweepstakes at York Racecourse in which she finished unplaced behind a colt named Popsy. Two days later she reappeared for a race over the same course and distance. Ridden by Sim Templeman, she recorded her first win "in a canter" by beating the colts Moonshine (subsequently the winner of the Champagne Stakes) and Reviewer. On 21 September, at the St Leger meeting at Doncaster Racecourse, Matilda started the 4/1 second favourite for a one mile sweepstakes for two-year-olds. Ridden by Bob Johnson, she led from the start and won by a length from Popsy, with the favourite Lunacy in third place.

=== 1827: three-year-old season ===
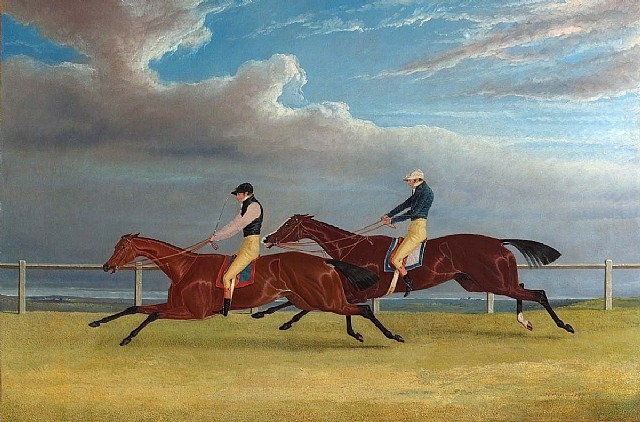
Matilda beats Mameluke in the 1827 St Leger

Matilda made her first appearance as a three-year-old at York on 10 August when she started 5/4 favourite for a ten furlong sweepstake. Ridden by Bill Scott, she led from the start, set a strong pace and "won easy" from Moonshine and Kit Cat. The Sporting Magazine praised the filly's speed, but criticised her lack of size, dubious stamina and difficult temperament. On 18 September, Matilda was sent to Doncaster to contest the St Leger Stakes over one and three quarter miles, in which she was ridden by Jem Robinson. She was third favourite in the betting at odds of 9/1 behind her stable companion Granby and the Derby winner Mameluke. The start of the race was chaotic and controversial: the official starter, Mr Lockwood, proved unable to control the jockeys and there were at least seven false starts before the race began. There were suspicions that Lockwood, and many of the jockeys had been bribed to delay the start for as long as possible in the hope of upsetting Mameluke and preventing the southern horse from winning. Matilda, however, was also disadvantaged: on several of the false starts she broke quickly and galloped a good distance before being recalled. When the race finally began Matilda led the field after 80 yards and maintained her advantage into the straight. A furlong from the finish she was headed by Mameluke, but rallied to win by a length. It was reported that Petre won bets totalling £15,000 on the race, including a £2,000 bet that he would win the St Leger before the "Catholic Question" was carried by parliament. Matilda was scheduled to run a match race over one mile against Mr Foljambe's black filly on the last day of the Doncaster meeting, but the race did not take place.

=== 1828: four-year-old season ===
In August 1828, Matilda began her third season with a run in a division of the Great Subscription Purse at York. She was expected to run well, starting the 7/4 favourite, but seemed unable to cope with the soft ground and finished third of the four runners behind Lady Georgiana and Popsy. A year after her last appearance at the course, Matilda ran in the Constitution Stakes at Doncaster in September. She led for most of the way but was overtaken in the straight and beaten three lengths by Laurel. On 8 October Matilda ran in the Gold Cup at Richmond, North Yorkshire and finished second of the eight runners behind her stable companion Delphine. Nine days later, Matilda appeared at Northallerton where she was made 4/5 for the Northallerton Gold Cup. She bolted either before or during the race and finished last of the four runners behind Delphine.

== Stud career ==
Matilda was retired from racing to become a broodmare for Petre. She later moved to the studs of the Duke of Cleveland in 1832, Lord Eglinton in 1841 and Lord William Powlett in 1844. She produced twelve live foals in sixteen years before her death in 1846. Her first foal, an unnamed filly sired by Whisker produced Nat, the winner of the Cambridgeshire Handicap in 1843. Matilda's daughter Eliza, sired by Physician, won the Champagne Stakes at Doncaster in 1838.

== Pedigree ==
Pedigree of Matilda (GB), bay mare, 1824
Sire Comus (GB) 1809	Sorcerer; 1796	Trumpator	Conductor
Sire Comus (GB) 1809	Sorcerer; 1796	Trumpator	Brunette
Sire Comus (GB) 1809	Sorcerer; 1796	Young Giantess	Diomed
Sire Comus (GB) 1809	Sorcerer; 1796	Young Giantess	Giantess
Sire Comus (GB) 1809	Houghton Lass; 1801	Sir Peter Teazle	Highflyer
Sire Comus (GB) 1809	Houghton Lass; 1801	Sir Peter Teazle	Papillon
Sire Comus (GB) 1809	Houghton Lass; 1801	Alexina	King Fergus
Sire Comus (GB) 1809	Houghton Lass; 1801	Alexina	Lardella
Dam Juliana (GB) 1810	Gohanna; 1790	Mercury	Eclipse
Dam Juliana (GB) 1810	Gohanna; 1790	Mercury	Tartar mare
Dam Juliana (GB) 1810	Gohanna; 1790	Dundas' Herod mare	Herod
Dam Juliana (GB) 1810	Gohanna; 1790	Dundas' Herod mare	Maiden
Dam Juliana (GB) 1810	Platina; 1792	Mercury	Eclipse
Dam Juliana (GB) 1810	Platina; 1792	Mercury	Tartar mare
Dam Juliana (GB) 1810	Platina; 1792	Milsinstown's Herod mare	Herod
Dam Juliana (GB) 1810	Platina; 1792	Milsinstown's Herod mare	Young Hag (Family:5-a)
