= The Marquis (horse) =

British-bred Thoroughbred racehorse

- Sire: Stockwell
- Grandsire: The Baron
- Dam: Cinizelli
- Damsire: Touchstone
- Sex: Colt
- Foaled: 1859
- Country: Great Britain
- Colour: Bay
- Owner: Stanhope Hawke
- Trainer: John Scott

Major wins
- Champagne Stakes (1861); Prendergast Stakes (1861); 2000 Guineas (1862); St Leger Stakes (1862)

The Marquis (1859 – October 1886) was a British Thoroughbred racehorse. After retiring from racing he became a successful stallion in Australia.

== Background ==
The Marquis was a bay colt foaled in 1859 and sired by Stockwell. His dam was Cinizelli, a daughter of Touchstone, who had previously produced The Oaks winner Marchioness. He was trained in Yorkshire by John Scott. He appears to have been a temperamental colt who wore blinkers and was usually accompanied to the start by his stable lad, who held onto his head until the last moment.

== Racing career ==
The Marquis won the Champagne Stakes at Doncaster Racecourse and the Prendergast Stakes at Newmarket as a two-year-old in 1861. In the spring of 1862 he won the 2,000 Guineas Stakes, beating Caterer by half a length. After the race he was surrounded by his Yorkshire supporters, some of whom narrowly escaped injury when he kicked out. He started favourite for The Derby and led for most of the way before being overtaken in the closing stages and beaten a neck by the outsider Caractacus. His jockey, Tom Ashmall, who had ridden the colt to victory in the Guineas, was criticised for going to the front too soon. Tom Challoner took over the ride when The Marquis started second favourite for the St. Leger Stakes on 18 September. He was not among the early leaders but moved to the front on the turn into the straight. Throughout the closing stages he was strongly challenged by the favourite Buckstone, and looked beaten at one point before rallying in the final strides to win by a head.

== Stud career ==
As a four-year-old, The Marquis was sold to Russian interests but spent most of his stud career in Australia. The Marquis died in October 1886 at the Bundoora Park Stud in Melbourne.

== Pedigree ==
Pedigree of The Marquis, bay colt, 1859
Sire Stockwell b. 1849	The Baron; Ch. 1842	Birdcatcher ch. 1833	Sir Hercules*
Sire Stockwell b. 1849	The Baron; Ch. 1842	Birdcatcher ch. 1833	Guiccioli
Sire Stockwell b. 1849	The Baron; Ch. 1842	Echidna b. 1838	Economist
Sire Stockwell b. 1849	The Baron; Ch. 1842	Echidna b. 1838	Miss Pratt
Sire Stockwell b. 1849	Pocahontas; Br. 1837	Glencoe ch. 15.2hh 1831	Sultan
Sire Stockwell b. 1849	Pocahontas; Br. 1837	Glencoe ch. 15.2hh 1831	Trampoline
Sire Stockwell b. 1849	Pocahontas; Br. 1837	Marpessa br. 1830	Muley
Sire Stockwell b. 1849	Pocahontas; Br. 1837	Marpessa br. 1830	Clare
Dam Cinizelli b. 1842	Touchstone b. 1831	Camel b. 1822	Whalebone*
Dam Cinizelli b. 1842	Touchstone b. 1831	Camel b. 1822	Selim Mare
Dam Cinizelli b. 1842	Touchstone b. 1831	Banter b. 1826	Master Henry
Dam Cinizelli b. 1842	Touchstone b. 1831	Banter b. 1826	Boadicea
Dam Cinizelli b. 1842	Brocade b. 1834	Pantaloon b. 1824	Castrel
Dam Cinizelli b. 1842	Brocade b. 1834	Pantaloon b. 1824	Idalia
Dam Cinizelli b. 1842	Brocade b. 1834	Bombasine b. 1817	Thunderbolt
Dam Cinizelli b. 1842	Brocade b. 1834	Bombasine b. 1817	Delta (Family: 2-b)

* The Marquis is inbred 5S x 4D to the stallion Whalebone, meaning that he appears fifth generation (via Sir Hercules) on the sire side of his pedigree, and fourth generation on the dam side of his pedigree.
