= Lord Lyon (horse) =

British Thoroughbred racehorse

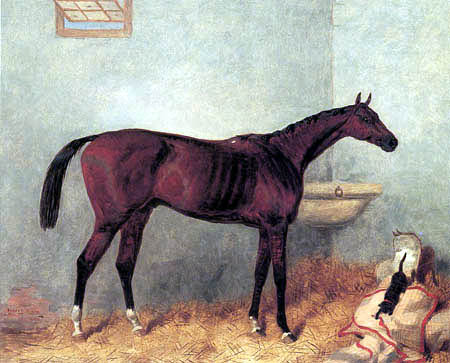
- Lord Lyon by Harry Hall
- Sire: Stockwell
- Grandsire: The Baron
- Dam: Paradigm
- Damsire: Paragone
- Sex: Stallion
- Foaled: 1863
- Country: United Kingdom of Great Britain and Ireland
- Colour: Bay
- Breeder: General Mark Pearson
- Owner: 1) General Mark Pearson (1863–1876); Richard Sutton (lessee, 1865–1867); 2) Lord Rosebery and Clare Vyner (1876–c.1880); 3) John Winteringham (c.1881–1887)
- Trainer: James Dover
- Record: 21: 17-3-1
- Earnings: £18,700 ($127,825)

Major wins
- Troy Stakes (1865); Criterion (1865); Epsom Derby (1866); 2,000 Guineas Stakes (1866); St. Leger Stakes (1866); Craven Stakes (1867)

Honours
- Third English Triple Crown winner

Lord Lyon (1863–1887) was a British Thoroughbred racehorse that won the 1866 Epsom Derby, 2,000 Guineas Stakes and the St. Leger Stakes, becoming the third winner of the English Triple Crown. Lord Lyon raced until he was four-years old and was retired to stud in 1868. He is considered to be a marginally successful sire with his most notable progeny being the colt Minting and the filly Placida. He was euthanized in April 1887 after several years of failing health.

== Background ==
Lord Lyon was foaled in 1863 at Oakley Hall, the stud farm of General Mark Pearson which was located twenty miles outside of Oakham in Northamptonshire. He was sired by Stockwell, winner of the 1852 St. Leger and 2,000 Guineas Stakes and a seven-time leading sire. Lord Lyon's dam, Paradigm, was not "fashionably bred" being sired by Paragone, a "3-guinea" sire noted more for producing hunt horses than racehorses. Paradigm's dam, Ellen Horne, was purchased by Pearson for around 18 guineas for his wife to use as a hack horse. Paradigm was an unsuccessful racehorse, running only twice and placing in the Lavender Stakes as a two-year-old before she fractured pastern while running in the Bentinck Memorial at Goodwood forcing her retirement from racing. Like her dam, Paradigm was also used as a hack before she entered the stud. Paradigm was later heralded as a worthy broodmare. In 1864, she foaled Lord Lyon's full sister, Achievement, which won the 1867 St. Leger, Doncaster Stakes and Coronation Cup among many other races. Another full-sister, Chevisaunce, was the dam of the Epsom Oaks and St. Leger winning filly Jannette. Paradigm produced a total of 13 foals and also produced King at Arms, Man at Arms and Blue Mantle.

Lord Lyon was a bay horse that stood 15.3 hands high with "good bone, flat feet and very short pastern joints" and had four white socks. He was also described as "odd-shaped" and "not quite correctly balanced in all his points." According to his regular jockey Henry Custance, Lord Lyon was "a very slight whistler" until the condition was treated by firing (applying a hot rod, similar to pin firing) the back of his throat. Lord Lyon also possessed a docile and gentle temperament and was described by his trainer James Dover as "the quietest horse I have got."

== Racing career ==
Lord Lyon was leased by Richard Sutton during his racing career with Pearson retaining partial ownership. Lord Lyon's first racing trial occurred in September 1864 when he was still a yearling. According to Charles Gregory, trainer James Dover's groom, General Pearson was "a hard man with his yearlings" and wanted "to know the best or the worst of them" as soon as the horses began training. Consequently, the yearling Lord Lyon was walked by Gregory 17 miles in the rain from Oxford to Ilsley to be trained by James Dover in early autumn 1864. Lord Lyon won 17 of his 21 starts in his racing career. He was retired to stud at the end of his four-year-old season.

=== 1864–1865: trials ===
Lord Lyon's first trial race occurred on 10 September 1864 and was a half mile race at Ilsley against the two-year-old filly Jezebel. Lord Lyon carried 115 pounds and Jezebel carried 122 pounds. Lord Lyon was beaten by a neck in the race, a commendable feat given that Jezebel was a seasoned racehorse that had won the Bath Biennial and was carrying only seven more pounds than Lord Lyon in the race. He was again tried on 29 April 1865, where carrying 112 pounds he finished third a length and a half behind Rustic and Grisette. This trial, where he was ridden in a gallop for most of the race, seemed to upset Lord Lyon, and he is described as going "amiss" for a period of time after the running. Lord Lyon trained on favorably over the summer of 1865 and was tried a third time on 3 August in a three quarters of a mile race on Ilsley Downs where he beat his three-year-old half-sister Gardevisure by seven lengths while only breaking into a canter. General Pearson insisted on another trial run between Lord Lyon and Gardevisure to force Lord Lyon to break into a gallop. In his fourth trial two-weeks later, Lord Lyon again beat Gardevisure by a margin of three lengths while running at a canter.

=== 1865: two-year-old season ===
Lord Lyon's first official start as a two-year-old occurred at Doncaster for the Champagne Stakes. With all the colts carrying 122 pounds, he ran a dead heat for the win with the colt Redan, who was owned by Lord St. Vincent. Lord Lyon's connections declined to take part in a deciding heat and Redan was allowed to walk over for the win. Lord Lyon's performance was so promising that commentary in Baily's Magazine of Sports & Pastimes asserted that, "if Lord Lyon had not been coughing so badly the day before, [they] should have heard of no dead heat." In September at the Newmarket meeting, the connections of the filly Mineral (later the dam of the 1876 Epsom Derby winner Kisber) forfeited 200 sovereigns to Lord Lyon after backing out of a match race. On 11 October, Lord Lyon won the 7-furlong Troy Stakes at Newmarket while carrying 122 pounds, beating the Duke of Beaufort's colt Mr. Pitt by a margin of three quarters of a length. At his last two-year-old engagement at Newmarket, Lord Lyon won the Criterion by two lengths from the colt Young Monarque while carrying 127 pounds.

=== 1866: three-year-old season ===
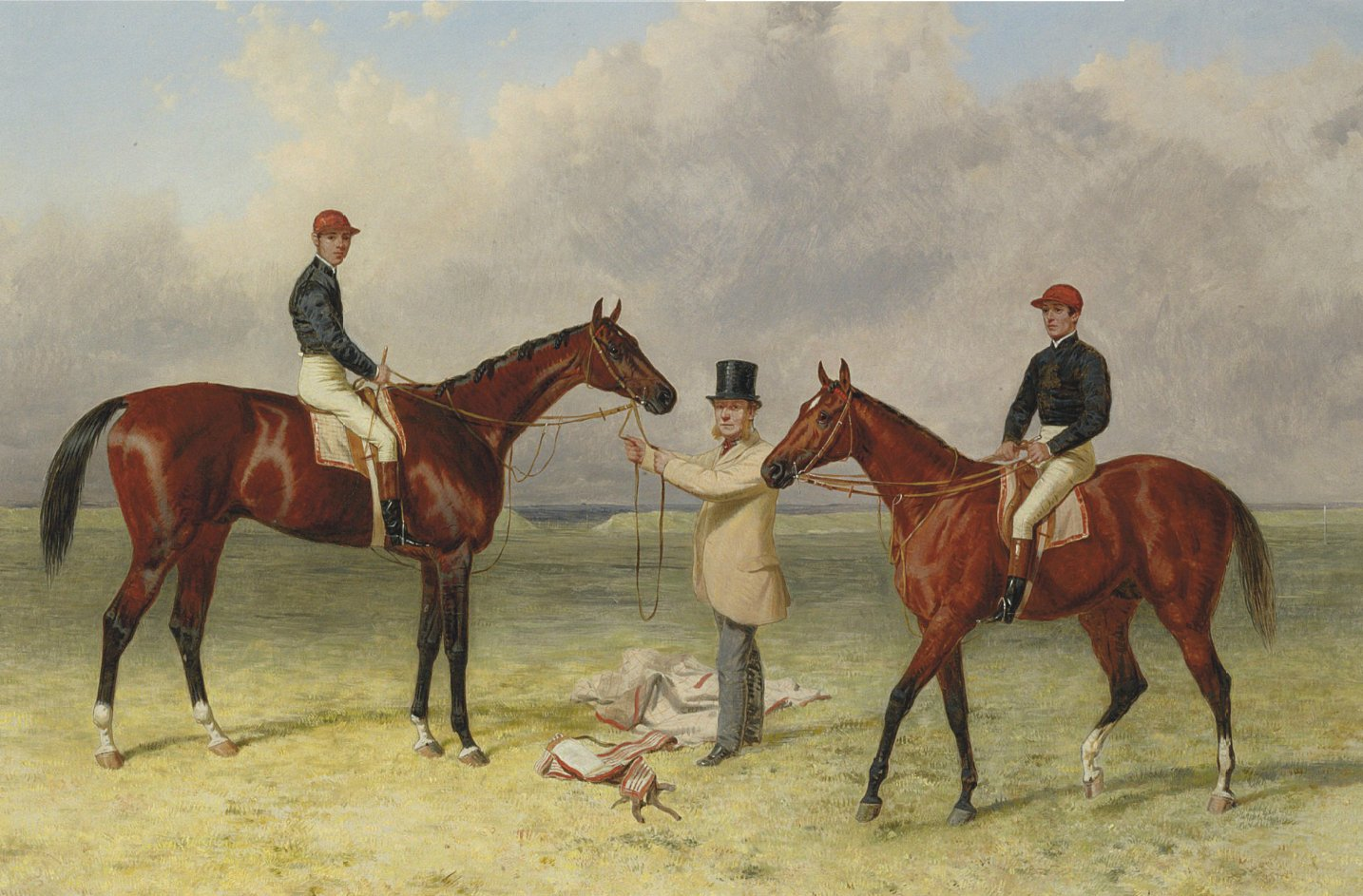
Lord Lyon (left) in 1867 with his racing-lessee Richard Sutton and five-year-old colt and Queen's Vase winner Elland in a painting by Harry Hall.

In the winter of 1866-1867 Lord Lyon was one of the leading fancies for the Derby, although some observers doubted his stamina. Among the other leading contenders was his former stable companion, Rustic.

On his three-year-old debut, Lord Lyon started 4/7 favourite for the 2000 Guineas at Newmarket in a field of fifteen runners. Ridden by R Thomas (Harry Custance was injured), he won from Monarch of the Glen.

At Epsom he again started odds-on favourite against twenty-five opponents. The start of the race was delayed for half an hour by false starts. Lord Lyon was not among the early leaders but moved steadily forward to dispute the lead with Redan turning into the straight. At this point he was overtaken on the inside by the unnamed "Bribery Colt" (later named Savernake) who opened up a clear lead. Custance persevered however and Lord Lyon responded to catch the Bribery Colt in the last strides and win by a head with Rustic three lengths back in third. The first three finishers were all sons of Stockwell. Lord Lyon reappeared at Royal Ascot and was second to Rustic in the Prince of Wales's Stakes, with Lord Lyon carrying 129 pounds and Rustic carrying 125 pounds.

At Doncaster in September Lord Lyon defeated Savernake "by sheer gameness and stamina" in the St Leger, winning by a head after what was described as one of the most exciting races seen in many years. The win completed what is now known as the Triple Crown, although it was not referred to as such in contemporary sources. On the day following his win in the St Leger, he finished second to Rama in the Doncaster Cup over two and a half miles. In October, Lord Lyon was sent to Newmarket, where he won the Select Stakes and the Grand Duke Michael Stakes and was second to the two-year-old colt Friponnier in the All-aged Stakes. Also at Newmarket he ran a match race against Rustic and reversed the result of his Ascot defeat to take the £1,000 stake by a margin of 20 lengths.

=== 1867: four-year-old season ===
In March, Lord Lyon won the Trial Stakes held at Northampton, beating the colt Moulsey "with the greatest ease" and winning £120. Lord Lyon won the Craven Stakes and two £100 Plate races at the First Spring meeting held in April at Newmarket. At Ascot, he won the £590 Biennial Stakes, beating Wild Moor by 12 lengths while carrying 140 pounds. At the Stockbridge meeting, Lord Lyon won the Stockbridge Cup (also called "The Cup" in the 1860s). Lord Lyon's final race occurred in Lincoln and was for the Queen's Plate, where he lost by a head to Rama. Lord Lyon was retired to stud in 1868 and full ownership of the horse was returned to General Pearson, the racing partnership of Sutton and Pearson being terminated after Sutton's retirement from racing in 1867.

== Stud career ==
Lord Lyon had a "chequered" stud career, standing at numerous stud farms over a 10-year period, leading Baily's Magazine to liken him to a "rolling-stone." In 1868, Lord Lyon became a breeding stallion for General Pearson after he retired from his racing career. He first stood at the Neasham Hall Stud Farm in Darlington for 30 guineas per mare and covered 45 mares in his first season. From 1871 to 1874, Lord Lyon stood at Hurstbourne Park in Whitchurch, Hampshire for a fee of 30 guineas between 1871 and 1873 and 50 guineas per mare in 1874. For the 1875 season, he was moved to Shepherd's Bush, a stud farm in London which was located three miles from Albert Gate (an entrance to Hyde Park), for a fee of 26 guineas per mare. Lord Lyon was sold in 1876 to Lord Rosebery and Clare Vyner for £4,500 and was relocated to Rosebery's Crafton Stud in Crafton, Buckinghamshire where he initially stood for a 50-guinea fee. His fee was reduced to 30 guineas per mare in 1879.

Lord Lyon's success at stud was hampered by chronic foot and leg ailments that stemmed from poor limb conformation. The Earl of Suffolk remarked on Lord Lyon's condition in 1884, "he was in most respects as perfect a model as one could wish to see, but below the knee he dwindled away to nothing; his ankles were small and bullety, his pasterns straight, and his feet half the size they should have been." In the early 1880s, Lord Lyon's connections decided to euthanize him, but his life was spared due to the efforts of John Winteringham. Winteringham relocated Lord Lyon to the Croft Stud at Croft-on-Tees around 1881. After the success of Minting, he was advertised in 1885 as a breeding stallion for Winteringham, covering a limited number of mares per season for a fee of 21 guineas per mare. Lord Lyon remained in Yorkshire until he was euthanized at the age of 24 on 12 April 1887.

=== Notable offspring ===
Foaled	Name	Sex	Major Wins/Achievements
1874	Placida	Mare	Epsom Oaks (1877)
1874	Touchet	Stallion	Won or placed in several major stakes races. Sired Necromancer, Juggler.
1883	Minting	Stallion	Grand Prix de Paris (1886)

== Pedigree ==
Pedigree of Lord Lyon (GB), Bay 1863
Sire Stockwell Chestnut 1849	The Baron; Ch. 1842	Birdcatcher	Sir Hercules
Sire Stockwell Chestnut 1849	The Baron; Ch. 1842	Birdcatcher	Guiccioli
Sire Stockwell Chestnut 1849	The Baron; Ch. 1842	Echidna	Economist
Sire Stockwell Chestnut 1849	The Baron; Ch. 1842	Echidna	Miss Pratt
Sire Stockwell Chestnut 1849	Pocahontas; Bay 1837	Glencoe	Sultan
Sire Stockwell Chestnut 1849	Pocahontas; Bay 1837	Glencoe	Trampoline
Sire Stockwell Chestnut 1849	Pocahontas; Bay 1837	Marpessa	Muley
Sire Stockwell Chestnut 1849	Pocahontas; Bay 1837	Marpessa	Clare
Dam Paradigm Bay 1853	Paragone; 1843	Touchstone	Camel
Dam Paradigm Bay 1853	Paragone; 1843	Touchstone	Banter
Dam Paradigm Bay 1853	Paragone; 1843	Hoyden	Tomboy
Dam Paradigm Bay 1853	Paragone; 1843	Hoyden	Rocbana
Dam Paradigm Bay 1853	Ellen Horne; 1844	Redshank	Sandbeck
Dam Paradigm Bay 1853	Ellen Horne; 1844	Redshank	Johanna
Dam Paradigm Bay 1853	Ellen Horne; 1844	Delhi	Plenipotentiary
Dam Paradigm Bay 1853	Ellen Horne; 1844	Delhi	Pawn Junior
