= Stockwell (horse) =

British-bred Thoroughbred racehorse

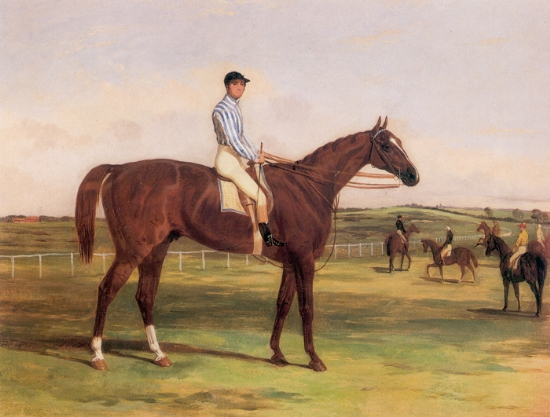
- Stockwell with jockey up by Harry Hall, 1852
- Sire: The Baron
- Grandsire: Birdcatcher
- Dam: Pocahontas
- Damsire: Glencoe
- Sex: Stallion
- Foaled: 1849
- Died: 1870 (aged 20–21)
- Country: Great Britain
- Colour: Chestnut
- Breeder: William Theobald
- Owner: Brownlow Cecil, 2nd Marquess of Exeter
- Trainer: W. Harlock
- Record: 16: 11-3-0

Major wins
- 2,000 Guineas (1852); Newmarket Stakes (1852); Great Yorkshire Stakes (1852); St. Leger Stakes (1852)

Awards
- Leading sire in GB & Ireland (1860–1862 & 1864–1867)
- Last updated on 21 February 2011

Stockwell (1849–1870) was a British Thoroughbred racehorse and a Leading sire in Great Britain & Ireland seven times; he was second on the sires' list a further four times during a 14-year period.

== Breeding ==
Stockwell was foaled in Stockwell, England, at the stud farm of William Theobald. His sire, The Baron was a successful racehorse and sire. His dam Pocahontas was a roarer – a trait never demonstrated in Stockwell himself, but passed to several of his descendants. Pocahontas later also produced the successful sires, Rataplan and King Tom.

The chestnut was not a particularly pretty horse; he was described by one turf writer as "the very incarnation of ugliness", possessing a plain head with a slight Roman nose and hindquarters like a carthorse. He had good feet, strong legs and was very powerful, however, giving him the ability to carry high weights. Although a poor mover he was very fast; his speed made up for his terrible temperament, which was considered "a bit savage". Stockwell stood over 16 hands high with a stripe on his nose, a sock on his off (right) hind leg, another mid-cannon sock on his near (left) hind leg and Bend-Or spots on his coat.

Although the colt was thought to be "over-large," Brownlow Cecil, 2nd Marquess of Exeter purchased the yearling for 180 sovereigns, with the contingency that he would pay £500 more if Stockwell won The Derby.

== Race record ==
=== Two-year-old ===
Stockwell began his racing career during the fall of his two-year-old year. He ran twice, finishing second by a head in the Prendergast Stakes for two-year-olds and fourth in the six-furlong Criterion Stakes.

=== Three-year-old ===
- Newmarket Craven: second by a neck
- 2,000 Guineas Stakes: won at 10–1 odds
- Newmarket Stakes: won, defeating Maidstone, Father Thames (winner of the Newmarket Handicap), and three others
- Goodwood: won, defeating Harbinger (by Touchstone) by a half-length
- Racing Stakes Handicap: won by two lengths, carrying top weight
- Great Yorkshire Stakes: won by a length, defeating Longbow, Hex and nine others
- Doncaster St. Leger Stakes: won by 10 lengths, defeating Harbinger, Daniel O'Rourke, Songstress (Oaks winner), and two others
- Foal Stakes: won in a walkover
- Grand Duke Michael Stakes: won by three lengths "in a canter", beating Muscovite (the Cesarewitch Handicap winner)
- Newmarket St. Leger: won by two lengths

Stockwell's three-year-old year was his greatest, and provided him with the reputation he would need to secure mares. His first race was the Craven Stakes at Newmarket Racecourse, where he finished second in a three-horse field by a neck. He won his next race, the 2,000 Guineas Stakes, at 10–1 odds before winning the Newmarket Stakes. He finished eighth in The Derby, although some believe that the colt had a tooth abscess lanced just prior to the race which would have affected his running. However, he finished his three-year-old season spectacularly with eight successive wins (including two walkovers).

=== Four-year-old ===
- Emperor of Russia's Plate (Ascot Gold Cup): 2nd

Stockwell ran once as a four-year-old, finishing second by a head in the Emperor of Russia's Plate (Ascot Gold Cup). He then went "amiss," and was sidelined for the rest of the 1853 season and most of the 1854 season.

=== Five-year-old ===
- The Whip: won

As a five-year-old he ran once in the Whip, beating Kingston (who broke down during the race), by 30 lengths. He was then retired to stud.

== Stud record ==
Stockwell was sent to Exeter's stud farm at Newmarket. Known as "The Emperor of Stallions" in his own time, Stockwell was a leading sire throughout the 1860s, Champion Sire in England seven times (from 1860 to 1862 and 1864 to 1867) and finishing second several times (1863, 1868, 1872, 1873).

His progeny won a total of 1,147 races, earning £362,451. 209 of his 412 foals were winners. Twelve of his offspring won 17 classic races, and 13 placed in one or more classic races. His sons were also successful sires, including Doncaster, sire of Bend Or. Many of his daughters were also good producers.

Lord Exeter sent Stockwell to his stud at Burghley. The stallion was sold at Tattersall's after his first season (for 3,000 guineas) to Albert Denison, 1st Baron Londesborough. Stockwell was then sent to Kirkby Farm (later renamed Stockwell Stud), where he stood for a fee of 30 guineas. It was here that he sired his first eight classic winners and headed the top of the sire list. However, the death of the Baron in 1860 led to a sale of all stock; Stockwell was purchased for 4,500 guineas by Richard C. Naylor of Cheshire, and sent to Rawcliffe Stud for his 1861 and 1862 seasons to stand for a fee of 40 guineas. He was fully booked to 50 mares, and led the sire list for two more years.

After the 1862 season, Stockwell was moved to Naylor's stud farm at Hooton Park, where he lived for the final eight years of his life in relative luxury. He went on 15-mile walks in good weather, and lived in a barn "big enough for him to run about in". By the end of his stud career his fee had risen to 300 guineas, and most of his breedings were to Naylor's own mares. Stockwell stood at stud from 1855 until his death, at the age of 21, due to an accident in the breeding shed.

=== Notable progeny ===
Foaled	Name	Sex	Major Wins/Achievements
1857	St. Albans	Stallion	St Leger Stakes
1858	Asteroid	Stallion	Ascot Gold Cup
1858	Bathilde	Mare	
1858	Caller Ou	Mare	St Leger Stakes
1858	Vaga	Mare	
1859	The Marquis	Stallion	Champagne Stakes, 2000 Guineas Stakes, St Leger Stakes
1860	Grimston	Stallion	
1860	Lady Augusta	Mare	1000 Guineas Stakes
1861	Blair Athol	Stallion	Epsom Derby, St Leger Stakes, Champion Sire
1861	Sweet Katie	Mare	
1862	Breadalbane	Stallion	
1862	Princess of Wales	Mare	Coronation Cup
1862	Regalia	Mare	Epsom Oaks
1863	Lord Lyon	Stallion	English Triple Crown, Champagne Stakes
1863	Repulse	Mare	1000 Guineas Stakes
1864	Achievement	Mare	Woodcote Stakes, July Stakes, Champagne Stakes, 1000 Guineas Stakes, St Leger Stakes, Doncaster Cup
1866	Belladrum	Mare	Woodcote Stakes
1866	Cherie	Mare	Cesarewitch Handicap
1868	Bothwell	Stallion	2000 Guineas Stakes
1868	Chevisaunce	Mare	
1869	Devotion	Mare	
1869	Highland Lassie	Mare	Coronation Stakes
1870	Cantiniere	Mare	Woodcote Stakes
1870	Doncaster	Stallion	Epsom Derby (1873)
1870	Gang Forward	Stallion	2000 Guineas Stakes, Ascot Derby
1870	Lady Chester	Mare	

== Pedigree ==
Pedigree of Stockwell, chestnut stallion, 1849
Sire The Baron Ch. 1842	Birdcatcher ch. 1833	Sir Hercules blk. 1826	Whalebone
Sire The Baron Ch. 1842	Birdcatcher ch. 1833	Sir Hercules blk. 1826	Peri
Sire The Baron Ch. 1842	Birdcatcher ch. 1833	Guiccioli ch. 1823	Bob Booty
Sire The Baron Ch. 1842	Birdcatcher ch. 1833	Guiccioli ch. 1823	Flight
Sire The Baron Ch. 1842	Echidna b. 1838	Economist br. 1825	Whisker
Sire The Baron Ch. 1842	Echidna b. 1838	Economist br. 1825	Floranthe
Sire The Baron Ch. 1842	Echidna b. 1838	Miss Pratt br. 1825	Blacklock
Sire The Baron Ch. 1842	Echidna b. 1838	Miss Pratt br. 1825	Gadabout*
Dam Pocahontas Br. 1837	Glencoe ch. 15.2hh 1831	Sultan b. 1816	Selim
Dam Pocahontas Br. 1837	Glencoe ch. 15.2hh 1831	Sultan b. 1816	Bacchante
Dam Pocahontas Br. 1837	Glencoe ch. 15.2hh 1831	Trampoline ch. 1825	Tramp
Dam Pocahontas Br. 1837	Glencoe ch. 15.2hh 1831	Trampoline ch. 1825	Web
Dam Pocahontas Br. 1837	Marpessa br. 1830	Muley b. 1810	Orville*
Dam Pocahontas Br. 1837	Marpessa br. 1830	Muley b. 1810	Eleanor
Dam Pocahontas Br. 1837	Marpessa br. 1830	Clare b. 1824	Marmion
Dam Pocahontas Br. 1837	Marpessa br. 1830	Clare b. 1824	Harpalice (Family: 3n)

* Stockwell is inbred 5S x 4D to the stallion Orville, meaning that he appears fifth generation (via Gadabout) on the sire side of his pedigree, and fourth generation on the dam side of his pedigree.

== See also ==
- Doncaster (horse)
- Pocahontas (horse)
- The Baron (horse)
