= William Higgs (jockey) =

British jockey, trainer, owner and breeder

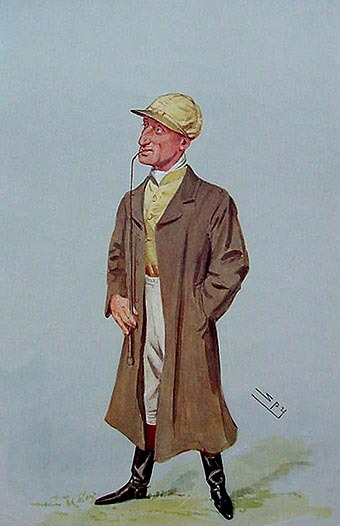
- Caricature of William Higgs from Vanity Fair, 21 November 1906

Personal information
- Born: 1880
- Died: 1958 (aged 77–78)
- Occupation: Jockey

Horse racing career
- Sport: Horse racing

Major racing wins
- British Classic Race wins as jockey: 2000 Guineas (1907)

Racing awards
- British flat racing Champion Jockey twice (1906, 1907)

Significant horses
- Slieve Gallion, Willonyx

William Arnold "Billy" Higgs (1880–1958) was a British Thoroughbred horse racing jockey, trainer, owner and breeder, colloquially referred to as "Farmer Higgs". He was twice Champion Jockey of Britain.

== Career ==
For the most successful period of his career, he was stable jockey to Sam Darling at Beckhampton, Wiltshire. With Darling, he won the 1906 and 1907 flat jockeys' championship, and picked up his only British Classic: the 1907 2,000 Guineas on Slieve Gallion. He was a short-priced favourite to follow up in the Derby, but the colt did not stay the distance and eventually finished third. In 1907, he finished with 146 winners from 732 rides, a near 20% strike rate.

In 1911 he scored a succession of top-class victories on Darling's stayer, Willonyx, winning the Chester Cup, Ascot Gold Cup, Jockey Club Cup and Cesarewitch. He also won the 1913 Doncaster Cup on Long Set.

Higgs later became a trainer and developed Blacklands Stud near Calne in Wiltshire, on a farm which he had bought in 1909; in 1928 he sold the business to Fred Darling, Sam's son.

In 1999, he was ranked the 28th greatest flat jockey of the 20th century by the Racing Post.

== Major wins ==
(United Kingdom) Great Britain

=== Classic Races ===
- 2,000 Guineas – Slieve Gallion (1907)

=== Selected other races ===
- Ascot Gold Cup – Willonyx (1911)
- Cambridgeshire Handicap – Land League (1907)
- Cesarewitch Handicap – Willonyx (1911)
- Chester Cup – Willonyx (1911)
- Doncaster Cup – Long Set (1913)
- Hardwicke Stakes – Beppo (1907)
- Jockey Club Cup – Willonyx (1911)
- Jockey Club Stakes – Beppo (1906)
