= John Scott (horseman) =

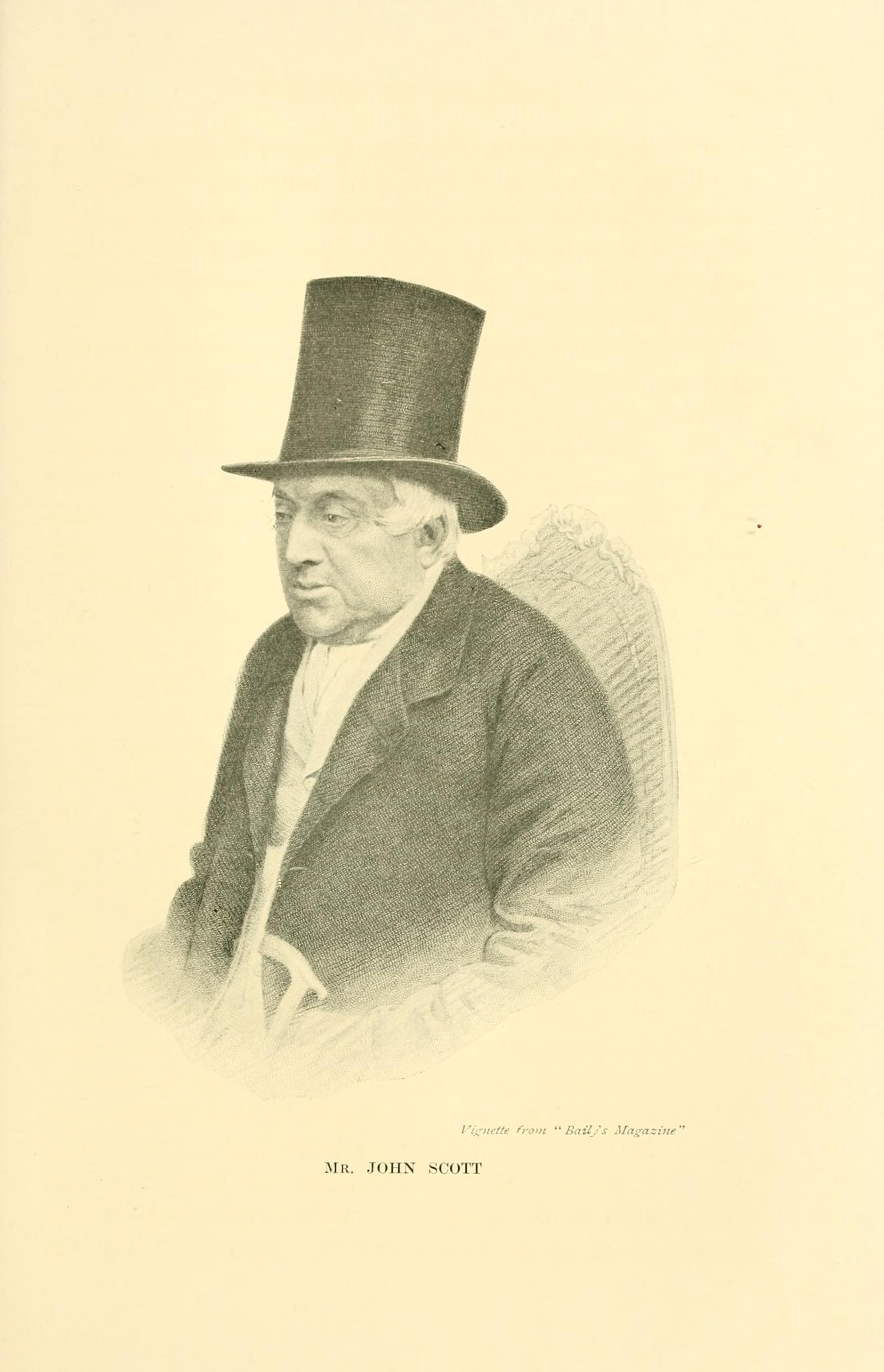
- from Ashgill (1900)

Personal information
- Born: 8 November 1794 England
- Died: 4 October 1871 (aged 76)
- Occupation: Trainer

Horse racing career
- Sport: Horse racing
- Career wins: Not found

Major racing wins
- Ascot Gold Cup (1834, 1836, 1837, 1854); Doncaster Gold Cup (1835, 1836, 1839, 1849); Northumberland Plate (1836) British Classic Race wins: 2,000 Guineas (7); 1,000 Guineas (4); Epsom Oaks (8); Epsom Derby (5); St. Leger Stakes (16)

Significant horses
- Matilda, The Colonel, Velocipede, Rowton, Touchstone, Canezou, Cotherstone, Mündig, Attila, The Baron, Daniel O'Rourke, West Australian, Imperieuse, The Marquis, Newminster
- Updated on 12 October 2007

John Scott (1794–1871) was a leading horse trainer in British Thoroughbred racing during the 19th century. Known as "The Wizard of the North", he was a brother to the successful jockey Bill Scott.

== Early life ==
John Scott and Bill were the sons of a former jockey who became a trainer. John was born on 8 November 1794 at Chippenham, Cambridgeshire. Although John also was a jockey while young and won his first race as a jockey at age 13, as he became older he gained too much weight to continue to ride and became a trainer instead. The brothers began their careers under their father, who managed an inn at Oxford - The Ship Inn. By 1814 were employed by James Croft of Middleham. In 1815 was involved in victory of Filho da Puta in the St. Leger Stakes. Scott then trained for a Mr Houldsworth for 8 years before moving on to train for Edward Petre of Stapleton Park near Darrington. In 1825 Scott bought Whitewall Stables in Malton, where he was able to stable 100 horses. This remained his home until his death. For many years Scott moved his operation in the summer months from Whitewall to a small race course outside Doncaster called Pigburn. This was because his local training ground became too hard for the horses to gallop during dry spells. In 1851 he constructed a "tan gallop" on Langton Wold, local to his Malton stables, where he could exercise his horses in dry weather conditions without the need to move them each year to Pigburn.

== Career ==
Scott won his first St Leger in 1822 with Theodore while training for Petre. This was the first of 16 St Leger wins, 8 Oaks wins, and 5 Epsom Derby wins. 6 of his St Leger wins were with his brother Bill as jockey, but in 1844 the brothers parted company and Frank Butler became the main jockey for John Scott, going on to win 10 Classics for Scott.

During his career, John Scott trained for notable owners such as Edward Smith-Stanley the Earl of Derby, Evelyn Boscawen Viscount Falmouth, and John Bowes. Scott disparaged The Baron to the horse's owner George Watts by describing the stallion as "fat as a bull" as well as having been "made twice the savage he was by muzzles" but still asked to have the horse put in training with himself, promising Watts that he would win the St Leger. Watts agreed to send The Baron to Whitewall, and Scott trained the horse to a win in the race. But Scott maintained that The Baron "took more work than I ever gave a horse in my life, and required more management".

During his training career, John Scott won 40 British Classic Races and in 1853 became the first trainer to win the English Triple Crown when the John Bowes owned colt, West Australian, won the 2,000 Guineas, The Derby, and the St. Leger Stakes. His total of British Classic wins remained a trainer's record until it was equalled by Aidan O'Brien in the 2021 Epsom Oaks.

In his old age, Scott was noted for his long white hair. He was also known to entertain guests at home by carving meat with a knife whose handle was the shank bone of Rowton, the third horse he trained to a St Leger win.

== Death ==
John Scott died on 4 October 1871 at Whitewall House after catching a chill in August while observing morning workouts.

He married twice. He had two children, a daughter with his first wife and a son with his second wife. A miniature watercolour portrait titled "John Scott of Whitewall Malton" from the English School (19th century) is on display at the Bowes Museum. After his death, the Whitewall Stables remained empty until his wife died in 1891. Following her death the stables were purchased by jockey Thomas Bruckshaw and today they are operated by trainer Mark Campion.

== Travel distance ==
Before the advent of rail links and motorised transport, racehorses were moved to and from events by being walked. The distance from Scott's Whitewall stables to the Doncaster Racecourse, where his horses won 16 St Leger Stakes, is about 60 miles. The distance from his stables to Newmarket where the 2000 and 1000 Guineas are held is about 190 miles and from the stables to Epsom (Derby and Oaks) is 250 miles. Some idea of the logistics involved comes from a news item in the Yorkshire Gazette, 14 February 1835:

"On Tuesday last, the following horses, from Mr. John Scott's stables, Whitewall Corner, near Malton, passed through this city [York], on their way to the south.
Many persons mustered to see them, who appeared to be highly delighted with the opportunity of beholding such a numerous train of choice racers.

- Lord Chesterfield's ch. g. Theodore, by Comus. 5 yrs old
- Lord Chesterfield's b. g. Valiant, by Velocipede 4 yrs old
- Lord Chesterfield's ch. f. Her Majesty, by Velocipede – Miss Garforth
- Lord Chesterfield's br. c. Fergus, by Waverley, out of sister to Tarrare
- Lord Wilton's b. f. Barbara Bell, by Catton, out of Barbara
- Mr Ridsdale's gr. c. Botanist, by Lottery, out of Flora, 4 yrs old
- Mr Ridsdale's br. c. Marcian, by Chateau Margaux, out of Marehesa
- Mr Ridsdale's b. c. Bamfylde, by Tramp or Comus, out of Y. Petuaria
- Mr Ridadale's ch. c. Coriolanus, by Emilius. out of Linda
- Mr Ridsdale's gr. c. Luck's-All, by Tramp, out of Flora
- Mr Walker s br. h. Consol, by Lottery, aged
- Mr Walker's cb. c. Curtius, by Emilius, out of Quadrille
- Mr Bowes's ch. c. Mundig, brother to Trustee, by Catton
- Mr Richardson's b. f. Lady de Gros, by Young Phantom, 4 yrs old"

The article indicated that several of the horses were either Epsom Derby or Oaks contenders and Mr Bowes's, Mundig, went on to win the Derby that year.

By 1839 the railway had reached York (less than 20 miles from the Whitewall stables) with a direct link to London. The Yorkshire Gazette in April 1844 reported that John Scott was moving his horses by rail, however, at this time there was no direct link to either Epsom or Newmarket - the line to Epsom opened in 1847 and the Newmarket line some years later.

When Scott took his horses to Epsom they were stabled at Leatherhead where there was a prepared gallop for their use.

== Selected major race wins ==
- 2,000 Guineas - (7) - Meteor (1842), Cotherstone (1843), Nunnykirk (1849), West Australian (1853), Fazzoletto (1856), The Wizard (1860), The Marquis (1862)
- 1,000 Guineas - (4) - Canezou (1848), Imperieuse (1857), Sagitta (1860), Hurricane (1862)
- Epsom Oaks - (8) - Cyprian (1836), Industry (1838), Ghuznee (1841), The Princess (1844), Iris (1851), Songstress (1852), Marchioness (1855), Queen Bertha (1863)
- Epsom Derby - (5) - Mündig (1835), Attila (1842), Cotherstone (1843), Daniel O'Rourke (1852), West Australian 1853)
- St. Leger Stakes - (16) - Matilda (1827), The Colonel (1828), Rowton (1829), Margrave (1832), Touchstone (1834), Don John (1838), Charles XII (1839), Launcelot (1840), Satirist (1841), The Baron (1845), Newminster (1851), West Australian (1853), Warlock (1856), Imperieuse (1857), Gamester (1859), The Marquis (1862)
- Ascot Gold Cup † - (3) - Touchstone (1836, 1837), West Australian (1854)
- Doncaster Gold Cup † - (4) - Touchstone (1835, 1836) Charles XII (1839), Canezou (1849)
- Northumberland Plate † - (1) - Cyprian (1836)

† Note: Scott may have won more editions of the Ascot Gold Cup, Doncaster Gold Cup, and the Northumberland Plate than reported here.
