= Champagne Stakes (Great Britain) =

British Thoroughbred horse race

- Class: Group 2
- Location: Doncaster Racecourse; Doncaster, England
- Inaugurated: 1823
- Race type: Flat / Thoroughbred
- Sponsor: Betfred
- Website: Doncaster

Race information
- Distance: 7f 6y (1,414 metres)
- Surface: Turf
- Track: Straight
- Qualification: Two-year-old colts and geldings
- Weight: 9 st 2 lb Penalties; 3 lb for G1 / G2 winners
- Purse: £150,000 (2025); 1st: £85,065

Champagne Stakes
2026
Desert Castle	Sergei Diaghilev	Breacher

Previous years
2025
Puerto Rico	Oxagon	Cape Orator
2024
Bay City Roller	Monumental	Aftermath
2023
Iberian	Sunway	Rosallion
2022
Chaldean	Indestructible	Silver Knott
2021
Bayside Boy	Reach For The Moon	Twilight Jet

2020-2011
2020
Chindit	Albasheer	State Of Rest
2019
Threat	Royal Crusade	Juan Elcano
2018
Too Darn Hot	Phoenix Of Spain	Cardini
2017
Seahenge	Hey Gaman	Mythical Magic
2016
Rivet	Thunder Snow	D'bai
2015
Emotionless	Ibn Malik	Palawan
2014
Estidhkaar	War Envoy	Aces
2013
Outstrip	The Grey Gatsby	Cable Bay
2012
Toronado	Dundonnell	Tha'ir
2011
Trumpet Major	Red Duke	Entifaadha

2010-2001
2010
Saamidd	Approve	Waiter's Dream
2009
Poet's Voice	Viscount Nelson	Silver Grecian
2008
Westphalia	Zacinto	Playfellow
2007
Mccartney	Alexander Castle	One Great Cat
2006
Vital Equine	Eagle Mountain	Cockney Rebel
2005
Close To You	Silent Times	Killybegs
2004
Etlaala	Iceman	Oude
2003
Lucky Story	Auditorium	Haafhd
2002
Almushahar	St Pancras	Wizard Of Noz
2001
Dubai Destination	Rock Of Gibraltar	Leo's Luckyman

2000-1991
2000
Noverre	Cd Europe	Ghayth
1999
Distant Music	Rossini	Winning Venture
1998
Auction House	Commander Collins	Tumbleweed Quartet
1997
Daggers Drawn	Docksider	Saratoga Springs
1996
Bahhare	In Command	Musheer
1995
Alhaarth	Rio Duvida	Take A Left
1994
Sri Pekan	Pipe Major	Alami
1993
Unblest	State Performer	Bluegrass Prince
1992
Petardia	Needle Gun	Fitzcarraldo
1991
Rodrigo De Triano	River Falls	Artic Tracker

1990-1988
1990
Bog Trotter	Arokat	Stone Mill
1988
Prince Of Dance	Shining Steel	Free Sweater

The Champagne Stakes is a Group 2 flat horse race in Great Britain open to two-year-old colts and geldings. It is run at Doncaster over a distance of 7 furlongs and 6 yards (1,414 metres), and it is scheduled to take place each year in September.

== History ==
The event was established in 1823, and it was originally open to horses of either gender. For a period it was contested over a mile, and it was shortened to 6 furlongs in 1870. It was extended to 7 furlongs in 1962, and restricted to male horses in 1988.

The Champagne Stakes is held during Doncaster's four-day St. Leger Festival, and it is currently run on the third day, the same day as the St Leger Stakes.

The leading horses from the race sometimes go on to compete in the following month's Dewhurst Stakes. The most recent horse to win both races was Chaldean in 2022.

== Records ==
Leading jockey (9 wins):

- Bill Scott – Swiss (1823), Memnon (1824), The Colonel (1827), Francesca (1831), Cotillon (1833), Jereed (1836), Don John (1837), Launcelot (1839), Attila (1841)

Leading trainer (10 wins):

- John Scott – Swiss (1823), The Colonel (1827), Jereed (1836), Don John (1837), Launcelot (1839), Attila (1841), Vindex (1852), The Bonnie Morn (1854), Prelude (1858), The Marquis (1861)
- Mathew Dawson – Zambezi (1864), Sunshine (1869), Camballo (1874), Farnese (1875), Lady Golightly (1876), Charibert (1878), Bal Gal (1880), Langwell (1884), Minting (1885), Ladas (1893)

== Winners since 1900 ==
Year	Winner	Jockey	Trainer	Time
1900	Orchid	Tod Sloan		1:09.60
1901	Game Chick	Lester Reiff		1:10.20
1902	Rock Sand	Danny Maher	George Blackwell	1:10.60
1903	Pretty Polly		Peter Gilpin
1904 (dh)	Galangal; Verdiana	William Halsey; Danny Maher	Charles Archer; George Lambton
1905	Achilles	Herbert Randall	Reg Day
1906	Slieve Gallion	Billy Higgs	Sam Darling
1907	Lesbia	Danny Maher	George Blackwell
1908	Duke Michael	Otto Madden	Doyle	1:09.20
1909	Neil Gow	Danny Maher	Percy Peck	1:09.00
1910	Pietri	Danny Maher	John Watson
1911	White Star	George Stern	Charles Morton
1912	Craganour	William Saxby	William Robinson	1:16.20
1913	The Tetrarch	Steve Donoghue	Atty Persse	1:12.60
1914	Redfern	James Clark	Alec Taylor Jr.
	no race 1915-18
1919	Tetratema	Brownie Carslake	Atty Persse	1:15.00
1920	Lemonora	Joe Childs	Alec Taylor Jr.	1:15.60
1921	Golden Corn	Joe Childs	Hugh Powney	1:14.60
1922	Drake	Michael Beary	Harry Cottrill
1923	Mumtaz Mahal	George Hulme	Richard Dawson	1:15.40
1924	Bucellas	Henri Jelliss	Basil Jarvis
1925	Coronach	George Archibald Sr.	Fred Darling	1:10.80
1926	Damon	Harry Beasley Jr.	Atty Persse	1:13.00
1927	Fairway	Tommy Weston	Frank Butters	1:15.00
1928	Arabella	Joe Childs	Peter Gilpin	1:12.40
1929	Fair Diana	Freddie Fox	Fred Darling	1:14.00
1930	Portlaw	Harry Beasley Jr.	Atty Persse	1:13.00
1931	Orwell	Bobby Jones	Joseph Lawson	1:15.60
1932	Myrobella	Gordon Richards	Fred Darling	1:12.00
1933	Blazonry	Richard Perryman	Dawson Waugh	1:12.40
1934	Kingsem	Steve Donoghue	Norman Scobie	1:12.40
1935	Mahmoud	Freddie Fox	Frank Butters	1:14.00
1936	Foray	Rufus Beasley	Cecil Boyd-Rochfort	1:14.00
1937	Portmarnock	Rufus Beasley	Cecil Boyd-Rochfort	1:14.80
1938	Panorama	Rufus Beasley	Cecil Boyd-Rochfort	1:15.40
	no race 1939-40
1941 (Note: The 1941 running was held at Newbury.)	Big Game	Harry Wragg	Fred Darling	1:13.40
	no race 1942–45
1946	Petition	Harry Wragg	Frank Butters	1:17.40
1947	My Babu	Edgar Britt	Sam Armstrong	1:13.80
1948	Abernant	Gordon Richards	Noel Murless	1:12.00
1949	Palestine	Gordon Richards	Frank Butters	1:14.40
1950	Big Dipper	Harry Carr	Cecil Boyd-Rochfort	1:15.80
1951	Orgoglio	Edgar Britt	Charles Elsey	1:15.40
1952	Bebe Grande	Willie Snaith	Sam Armstrong	1:12.60
1953	Darius	Manny Mercer	Harry Wragg	1:13.20
1954	Our Babu	Doug Smith	Geoffrey Brooke	1:14.80
1955	Rustam	Doug Smith	Geoffrey Brooke	1:14.00
1956	Eudaemon	Edgar Britt	Charles Elsey	1:17.00
1957	Kelly	Jack Purtell	Noel Cannon	1:15.00
1958	Be Careful	Eddie Hide	Charles Elsey	1:11.40
1959	Paddy's Sister	George Moore	Paddy Prendergast	1:11.00
1960	Ambergris	Jimmy Lindley	Harry Wragg	1:13.40
1961	Clear Sound	Ron Hutchinson	Paddy Prendergast	1:14.00
1962	King Of Babylon	Eddie Hide	Bill Elsey	1:27.60
1963	Talahasse	Scobie Breasley	Atty Corbett	1:25.60
1964	Hardicanute	Garnie Bougoure	Paddy Prendergast	1:27.60
1965	Celtic Song	Lester Piggott	Paddy Prendergast	1:29.60
1966	Bold Lad	Des Lake	Paddy Prendergast	1:30.00
1967	Cheb's Lad	Brian Connorton	Snowy Gray	1:24.40
1968	Ribofilio	Lester Piggott	Fulke Johnson Houghton	1:24.60
1969	Saintly Song	Sandy Barclay	Noel Murless	1:27.60
1970	Breeder's Dream	Frankie Durr	Michael Jarvis	1:32.40
1971	Crowned Prince	Lester Piggott	Bernard van Cutsem	1:27.00
1972	Otha	Willie Carson	Bernard van Cutsem	1:31.45
1973	Giacometti	Tony Murray	Ryan Price	1:28.00
1974	Grundy	Pat Eddery	Peter Walwyn	1:27.20
1975	Wollow	Gianfranco Dettori	Henry Cecil	1:27.70
1976	J. O. Tobin	Lester Piggott	Noel Murless	1:27.84
1977	Sexton Blake	Willie Carson	Barry Hills	1:26.67
1978	R. B. Chesne	Joe Mercer	Henry Cecil	1:28.33
1979	Final Straw	Paul Cook	Michael Stoute	1:28.35
1980	Gielgud	Joe Mercer	Henry Cecil	1:28.92
1981	Achieved	Pat Eddery	Vincent O'Brien	1:27.09
1982	Gorytus	Willie Carson	Dick Hern	1:26.24
1983	Lear Fan	Tony Clark	Guy Harwood	1:28.16
1984	Young Runaway	Greville Starkey	Guy Harwood	1:28.81
1985	Sure Blade	Brent Thomson	Barry Hills	1:28.30
1986	Don't Forget Me	Pat Eddery	Richard Hannon Sr.	1:25.06
1987	Warning	Pat Eddery	Guy Harwood	1:25.22
1988	Prince of Dance	Willie Carson	Neil Graham	1:26.50
1989	Abandoned due to subsidence
1990	Bog Trotter	Nigel Day	William Haggas	1:26.88
1991	Rodrigo de Triano	Willie Carson	Peter Chapple-Hyam	1:26.55
1992	Petardia	Michael Hills	Geoff Wragg	1:25.86
1993	Unblest	George Duffield	James Fanshawe	1:28.36
1994	Sri Pekan	Michael Kinane	Paul Cole	1:27.22
1995	Alhaarth	Willie Carson	Dick Hern	1:31.57
1996	Bahhare	Willie Carson	John Dunlop	1:23.21
1997	Daggers Drawn	Kieren Fallon	Henry Cecil	1:26.92
1998	Auction House	Michael Hills	Barry Hills	1:26.08
1999	Distant Music	Michael Hills	Barry Hills	1:24.16
2000	Noverre	Frankie Dettori	David Loder	1:25.67
2001	Dubai Destination	Frankie Dettori	David Loder	1:26.45
2002	Almushahar	Frankie Dettori	David Loder	1:24.15
2003	Lucky Story	Darryll Holland	Mark Johnston	1:27.92
2004	Etlaala	Richard Hills	Barry Hills	1:23.33
2005 (dh)	Close to You; Silent Times	John Egan; Jamie Spencer	Terry Mills; Eoghan O'Neill	1:26.62
2006 (Note: The 2006 running took place at York)	Vital Equine	Richard Mullen	Eoghan O'Neill	1:23.29
2007	McCartney	Ryan Moore	Mark Johnston	1:25.04
2008	Westphalia (Note: The 2008 winner Westphalia was later exported to Hong Kong and renamed Super Pistachio)	Johnny Murtagh	Aidan O'Brien	1:28.52
2009	Poet's Voice	Frankie Dettori	Saeed bin Suroor	1:24.91
2010	Saamidd	Frankie Dettori	Saeed bin Suroor	1:26.32
2011	Trumpet Major	Richard Hughes	Richard Hannon Sr.	1:25.86
2012	Toronado	Richard Hughes	Richard Hannon Sr.	1:24.88
2013	Outstrip	Mickael Barzalona	Charlie Appleby	1:26.90
2014	Estidhkaar	Paul Hanagan	Richard Hannon Jr.	1:24.18
2015	Emotionless	William Buick	Charlie Appleby	1:27.49
2016	Rivet	Andrea Atzeni	William Haggas	1:26.63
2017	Seahenge	Donnacha O'Brien	Aidan O'Brien	1:25.78
2018	Too Darn Hot	Frankie Dettori	John Gosden	1:23.92
2019	Threat	Pat Dobbs	Richard Hannon Jr.	1:25.42
2020	Chindit	Pat Dobbs	Richard Hannon Jr.	1:24.21
2021	Bayside Boy	David Egan	Roger Varian	1:27.88
2022	Chaldean	Frankie Dettori	Andrew Balding	1:27.01
2023	Iberian	Tom Marquand	Charles Hills	1:27.35
2024	Bay City Roller	Callum Shepherd	George Scott	1:25.02
2025	Puerto Rico	Sean Levey	Aidan O'Brien	1:25.93
2026	Desert Castle	Billy Loughnan	Charlie Appleby	1:26.25

== Earlier winners ==
- 1823: Swiss
- 1824: Memnon
- 1825: King Catton
- 1826: Moonshine
- 1827: The Colonel
- 1828: Cant
- 1829: Bud
- 1830: Frederica
- 1831: Francesca
- 1832: Muley Moloch
- 1833: Cotillon
- 1834: Coriolanus
- 1835: Beeswing
- 1836: Jereed
- 1837: Don John
- 1838: Eliza
- 1839: Launcelot
- 1840: Kedge
- 1841: Attila
- 1842: A British Yeoman
- 1843: The Cure
- 1844: Lancashire Witch
- 1845: Princess Alice
- 1846: Van Tromp
- 1847: Assault
- 1848: The Flying Dutchman
- 1849: The Italian
- 1850: Aphrodite
- 1851: Augur
- 1852: Vindex
- 1853: Champagne
- 1854: The Bonnie Morn
- 1855: Ellington
- 1856: Tasmania
- 1857: Gildermire
- 1858: Prelude
- 1859: King of Diamonds
- 1860: Walloon
- 1861: The Marquis
- 1862: Lord Clifden
- 1863: Ely
- 1864: Zambezi
- 1865: Redan ^{1}
- 1866: Achievement
- 1867: Virtue ^{2}
- 1868: Morna
- 1869: Sunshine
- 1870: King of the Forest
- 1871: Cremorne
- 1872: Kaiser
- 1873: Napoleon III
- 1874: Camballo
- 1875: Farnese
- 1876: Lady Golightly
- 1877: Clementine
- 1878: Charibert
- 1879: Evasion
- 1880: Bal Gal
- 1881: Kermesse
- 1882: Hauteur
- 1883: Superba
- 1884: Langwell
- 1885: Minting
- 1886: Grandison / Panzerschiff ^{3}
- 1887: Ayrshire
- 1888: Chittabob
- 1889: Riviera
- 1890: Haute Saône
- 1891: La Fleche
- 1892: The Prize
- 1893: Ladas
- 1894: Solaro
- 1895: Omladina
- 1896: Velasquez
- 1897: Ayah
- 1898: Mark For'ard
- 1899: Democrat

^{1} The 1865 race was a dead heat, but Redan was awarded victory after Lord Lyon's owner declined to take part in a run-off.
^{2} Blue Gown finished first in 1867, but he was disqualified for carrying an undeclared weight.
^{3} The 1886 race was a dead-heat and has joint winners.

== See also ==
- Horse racing in Great Britain
- List of British flat horse races
