= Alfred Hayhoe =

British racehorse trainer

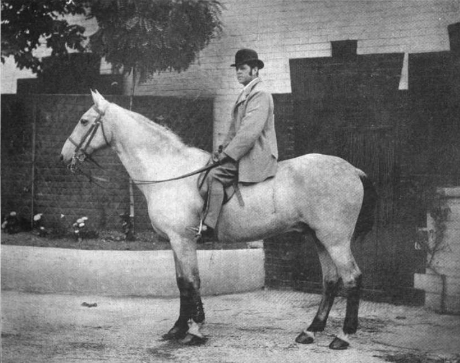
- In The Sketch, 3 June 1896
- Born: c. 1852; Malton, England
- Died: 15 April 1930 (aged 77–78); Newmarket, England
- Occupation: Racehorse trainer

Alfred Hayhoe was a British racehorse trainer. He was Champion Trainer in 1896.

== Biography ==
Alfred Hayhoe was born in Malton, North Yorkshire in about 1852.

He died in Newmarket, Suffolk on 15 April 1930.
