= 2000 Guineas Stakes =

British Group 1 horse race for three-year-old colts and fillies

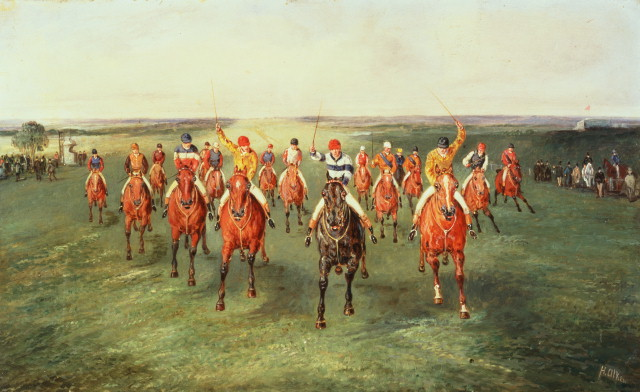
- The Finish of the Two Thousand Guineas at Newmarket by Samuel Henry Alken (1810–1894)
- Class: Group 1
- Location: Rowley Mile; Newmarket, Suffolk, England
- Inaugurated: 1809
- Race type: Flat / Thoroughbred
- Sponsor: Betfred
- Website: Newmarket

Race information
- Distance: 1 mile (1,609 metres)
- Surface: Turf
- Track: Straight
- Qualification: Three-year-olds excluding geldings
- Weight: 9 st 2 lb Allowances; 3 lb for fillies
- Purse: £525,000 (2025); 1st: £297,728

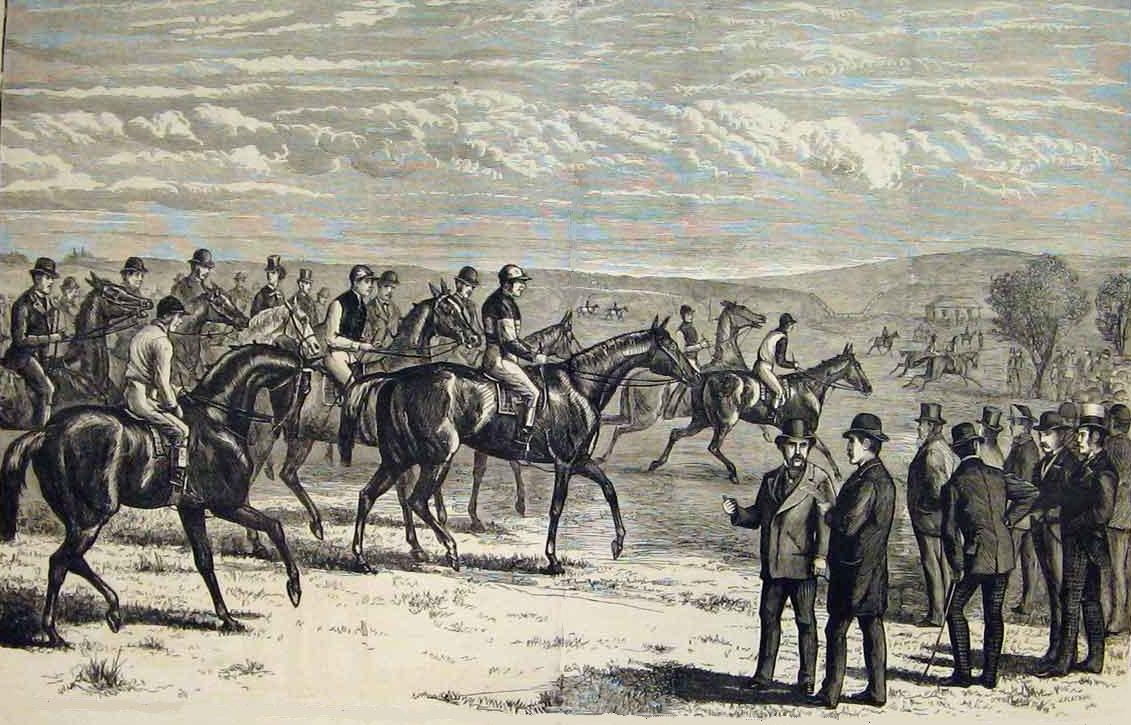
Engraving of the 1874 2,000 Guineas, from the Illustrated Sporting and Dramatic News, May 1874

The 2000 Guineas Stakes is a Group 1 flat race in Great Britain open to three-year-old thoroughbred colts and fillies. It is run on the Rowley Mile at Newmarket over a distance of 1 mile (1.6 km) and scheduled to take place each year at the start of May.

It is one of Britain's five Classic races, and at present it is the first to be run in the year. It also serves as the opening leg of the Triple Crown, followed by the Derby and the St Leger, although the feat of winning all three has been rarely attempted in recent decades.

2000 Guineas Stakes
2026
Bow Echo	Gstaad	Distant Storm

Previous years
2025
Ruling Court	Field Of Gold	Shadow Of Light
2024
Notable Speech	Rosallion	Haatem
2023
Chaldean	Hi Royal	Royal Scotsman
2022
Coroebus	Native Trail	Luxembourg
2021
Poetic Flare	Master of the Seas	Lucky Vega

2020-2011
2020
Kameko	Wichita	Pinatubo
2019
Magna Grecia	King of Change	Skardu
2018
Saxon Warrior	Tip Two Win	Masar
2017
Churchill	Barney Roy	Al Wukair
2016
Galileo Gold	Massaat	Ribchester
2015
Gleneagles	Territories	Ivawood
2014
Night of Thunder	Kingman	Australia
2013
Dawn Approach	Glory Awaits	Van Der Neer
2012
Camelot	French Fifteen	Hermival
2011
Frankel	Dubawi Gold	Native Khan

2010-2001
2010
Makfi	Dick Turpin	Canford Cliffs
2009
Sea The Stars	Delegator	Gan Amhras
2008
Henrythenavigator	New Approach	Stubbs Art
2007
Cockney Rebel	Vital Equine	Dutch Art
2006
George Washington	Sir Percy	Olympian Odyssey
2005
Footstepsinthesand	Rebel Rebel	Kandidate
2004
Haafhd	Snow Ridge	Azamour
2003
Refuse To Bend	Zafeen	Norse Dancer
2002
Rock of Gibraltar	Hawk Wing	Redback
2001
Golan	Tamburlaine	Frenchmans Bay

2000-1991
2000
King's Best	Giant's Causeway	Barathea Guest
1999
Island Sands	Enrique	Mujahid
1998
King of Kings	Lend A Hand	Border Arrow
1997
Entrepreneur	Revoque	Poteen
1996
Mark of Esteem	Even Top	Bijou d'Inde
1995
Pennekamp	Celtic Swing	Bahri
1994
Mister Baileys	Grand Lodge	Colonel Collins
1993
Zafonic	Barathea	Bin Ajwaad
1992
Rodrigo De Triano	Lucky Lindy	Pursuit of Love
1991
Mystiko	Lycius	Ganges

1990-1981
1990
Tirol	Machiavellian	Anshan
1989
Nashwan	Exbourne	Danehill
1988
Doyoun	Charmer	Bellefella
1987
Don't Forget Me	Bellotto	Midyan
1986
Dancing Brave	Green Desert	Huntingdale
1985
Shadeed	Bairn	Supreme Leader
1984
El Gran Senor	Chief Singer	Lear Fan
1983
Lomond	Tolomeo	Muscatite
1982
Zino	Wind and Wuthering	Tender King
1981
To-Agori-Mou	Mattaboy	Bel Bolide

1980-1971
1980
Nureyev	Known Fact	Posse
1979
Tap on Wood	Kris	Young Generation
1978
Roland Gardens	Remainder Man	Weth Nan
1977
Nebbiolo	Tachypous	The Minstrel
1976
Wollow	Vitiges	Thieving Demon
1975
Bolkonski	Grundy	Dominion
1974
Nonoalco	Giacometti	Apalachee
1973
Mon Fils	Noble Decree	Sharp Edge
1972
High Top	Roberto	Sun Prince
1971
Brigadier Gerard	Mill Reef	My Swallow

1970-1965
1970
Nijinsky	Yellow God	Roi Soleil
1969
Right Tack	Tower Walk	Welsh Pageant
1968
Sir Ivor	Petingo	Jimmy Reppin
1967
Royal Palace	Taj Dewan	Missile
1966
Kashmir	Great Nephew	Celtic Song
1965
Niksar	Silly Season	Present

== History ==
The 2000 Guineas Stakes was first run on 18 April 1809, and it preceded the introduction of a version for fillies only, the 1000 Guineas Stakes, by five years. Both races were established by the Jockey Club under the direction of Sir Charles Bunbury, who had earlier co-founded the Derby at Epsom. The races were named according to their original prize funds (a guinea amounted to 21 shillings, so the original prize was £2,100).

By the mid-1860s, the 2000 Guineas was regarded as one of Britain's most prestigious races for three-year-olds. The five leading events for this age group, characterised by increasing distances as the season progressed, began to be known as "Classics". The concept was later adopted in many other countries.

European variations of the 2000 Guineas include the Irish 2,000 Guineas, the Mehl-Mülhens-Rennen, the Poule d'Essai des Poulains and the Premio Parioli. Elsewhere, variations include the Australian Guineas and the Satsuki Shō.

The 2000 Guineas is served by trial races such as the Craven Stakes and the Greenham Stakes, but for some horses it is the first race of the season. The 2000 Guineas itself can act as a trial for the Derby, and the last horse to win both was Camelot in 2012. The most recent 2000 Guineas participant to win the Derby was City Of Troy, placed ninth in 2024.

Since 2001, the 2000 Guineas and the 1000 Guineas Stakes have offered equal prize money. Each had a purse of £523,750 in 2019.

== Records ==
Leading jockey (9 wins):

- Jem Robinson – Enamel (1825), Cadland (1828), Riddlesworth (1831), Clearwell (1833), Glencoe (1834), Ibrahim (1835), Bay Middleton (1836), Conyngham (1847), Flatcatcher (1848)

Leading trainer (10 wins) :

- Aidan O'Brien – King of Kings (1998), Rock of Gibraltar (2002), Footstepsinthesand (2005), George Washington (2006), Henrythenavigator (2008), Camelot (2012), Gleneagles (2015), Churchill (2017), Saxon Warrior (2018), Magna Grecia (2019)

Leading owner (11 wins): (includes part ownership)

- Sue Magnier – Entrepreneur (1997), King of Kings (1998), Rock of Gibraltar (2002), Footstepsinthesand (2005), George Washington (2006), Henrythenavigator (2008), Camelot (2012), Gleneagles (2015), Churchill (2017), Saxon Warrior (2018), Magna Grecia (2019)
- Fastest winning time – Kameko (2020), 1m 34.72s
- Widest winning margin (since 1900) – Tudor Minstrel (1947), 8 lengths
- Longest odds winner – Rockavon (1961), 66/1
- Shortest odds winner – St Frusquin (1896), 12/100
- Most runners – 28, in 1930
- Fewest runners – 2, in 1829 and 1830

== Winners ==
Year	Winner	Jockey	Trainer	Owner	Time
1809	Wizard	Bill Clift	Tom Perren	Christopher Wilson
1810	Hephestion	Frank Buckle	Robert Robson	2nd Earl Grosvenor
1811	Trophonius	Sam Barnard	Dixon Boyce	Robert Andrew
1812	Cwrw	Sam Chifney Jr.	William Chifney	3rd Earl of Darlington
1813	Smolensko	H. Miller	Crouch	Sir Charles Bunbury
1814	Olive	Bill Arnull	Dixon Boyce	Charles Wyndham
1815	Tigris	Bill Arnull	Dixon Boyce	1st Baron Rous
1816	Nectar	Bill Arnull	Dixon Boyce	Lord George Cavendish
1817	Manfred	Will Wheatley	Robert Stephenson	Scott Stonehewer
1818	Interpreter	Bill Clift	Richard Prince	3rd Baron Foley
1819	Antar	Edward Edwards	James Edwards	Sir John Shelley
1820	Pindarrie	Frank Buckle	Robert Robson	4th Duke of Grafton
1821	Reginald	Frank Buckle	Robert Robson	4th Duke of Grafton
1822	Pastille ‡	Frank Buckle	Robert Robson	4th Duke of Grafton
1823	Nicolo	Will Wheatley	Joe Rogers	Joe Rogers
1824	Schahriar	Will Wheatley		James Haffenden
1825	Enamel	Jem Robinson	Charles Marson	2nd Marquess of Exeter
1826	Dervise	John Barham Day	Robert Robson	4th Duke of Grafton
1827	Turcoman	Frank Buckle	Robert Robson	4th Duke of Grafton
1828	Cadland	Jem Robinson	Dixon Boyce	5th Duke of Rutland
1829	Patron	Frank Boyce	Charles Marson	2nd Marquess of Exeter
1830	Augustus	Patrick Conolly	Charles Marson	2nd Marquess of Exeter
1831	Riddlesworth	Jem Robinson	James Edwards	5th Earl of Jersey
1832	Archibald	Arthur Pavis		Jonathan Peel
1833	Clearwell	Jem Robinson		3rd Earl of Orford
1834	Glencoe	Jem Robinson	James Edwards	5th Earl of Jersey
1835	Ibrahim	Jem Robinson	James Edwards	5th Earl of Jersey
1836	Bay Middleton	Jem Robinson	James Edwards	5th Earl of Jersey
1837	Achmet	Edward Edwards	James Edwards	5th Earl of Jersey
1838	Grey Momus	John Barham Day	John Barham Day	Lord George Bentinck
1839	The Corsair	Bill Wakefield	John Doe	1st Earl of Lichfield
1840	Crucifix ‡	John Barham Day	John Barham Day	Lord George Bentinck
1841	Ralph	John Barham Day	W. Edwards	4th Earl of Albemarle
1842	Meteor	Bill Scott	John Scott	John Bowes
1843	Cotherstone	Bill Scott	John Scott	John Bowes
1844	The Ugly Buck	John Day	John Barham Day	John Barham Day
1845	Idas	Nat Flatman	Robert Boyce Jr.	2nd Earl of Stradbroke
1846	Sir Tatton Sykes	Bill Scott	William Oates	Bill Scott
1847	Conyngham	Jem Robinson	John Day	Sir Robert Pigot
1848	Flatcatcher	Jem Robinson	Henry Stebbing	B. Green
1849	Nunnykirk	Frank Butler	John Scott	Anthony Nichol
1850	Pitsford	Alfred Day	John Day	Harry Hill
1851	Hernandez	Nat Flatman	John Kent Jr.	Viscount Enfield
1852	Stockwell	John Norman	William Harlock	2nd Marquess of Exeter
1853	West Australian †	Frank Butler	John Scott	John Bowes
1854	The Hermit	Alfred Day	John Day	John Gully
1855	Lord of the Isles	Tom Aldcroft	William Day	James Merry
1856	Fazzoletto	Nat Flatman	John Scott	14th Earl of Derby
1857	Vedette	John Osborne Jr.	George Abdale	2nd Earl of Zetland	1:51.00
1858	Fitz-Roland	John Wells	George Manning	Sir Joseph Hawley
1859	The Promised Land	Alfred Day	William Day	William Day
1860	The Wizard	Tom Ashmall	John Scott	Anthony Nichol
1861	Diophantus	Arthur Edwards	Joseph Dawson	7th Earl of Stamford	1:43.00
1862	The Marquis	Tom Ashmall	John Scott	Stanhope Hawke
1863	Macaroni	Tom Chaloner	James Godding	Richard Naylor
1864	General Peel	Tom Aldcroft	Tom Dawson	5th Earl of Glasgow	1:48.50
1865	Gladiateur †	Harry Grimshaw	Tom Jennings, Sr.	Frédéric de Lagrange
1866	Lord Lyon †	R. Thomas	James Dover	Richard Sutton
1867	Vauban	George Fordham	John Day	8th Duke of Beaufort
1868 (dh)	Formosa † ‡ Moslem	George Fordham; Tom Chaloner	Henry Woolcott; Alec Taylor, Sr.	William Graham; William Stirling Crawfurd
1869	Pretender	John Osborne Jr.	Tom Dawson	John Johnstone
1870	Macgregor	John Daley	J. Waugh	James Merry
1871	Bothwell	John Osborne Jr.	Tom Dawson	John Johnstone
1872	Prince Charlie	John Osborne Jr.	Joseph Dawson	Joseph Dawson
1873	Gang Forward	Tom Chaloner	Alec Taylor, Sr.	William Stirling Crawfurd	1:46.00
1874	Atlantic	Fred Archer	Mathew Dawson	6th Viscount Falmouth
1875	Camballo	John Osborne Jr.	Mathew Dawson	Clare Vyner
1876	Petrarch	Harry Luke	John Dawson, Sr.	Viscount Dupplin
1877	Chamant	Jem Goater	Tom Jennings, Sr.	Frédéric de Lagrange	1:50.00
1878	Pilgrimage ‡	Tom Cannon, Sr.	Joe Cannon	4th Earl of Lonsdale	1:56.00
1879	Charibert	Fred Archer	Mathew Dawson	6th Viscount Falmouth	1:51.00
1880	Petronel	George Fordham	Joe Cannon	8th Duke of Beaufort	1:52.00
1881	Peregrine	Fred Webb	Robert Peck	1st Duke of Westminster	1:49.00
1882	Shotover ‡	Tom Cannon, Sr.	John Porter	1st Duke of Westminster	1:53.40
1883	Galliard	Fred Archer	Mathew Dawson	6th Viscount Falmouth	1:50.40
1884	Scot Free	Billy Platt	Tom Chaloner	John Foy	1:48.00
1885	Paradox	Fred Archer	John Porter	William Broderick Cloete	1:51.40
1886	Ormonde †	George Barrett	John Porter	1st Duke of Westminster	1:46.80
1887	Enterprise	Tom Cannon, Sr.	James Ryan	Douglas Baird	1:45.60
1888	Ayrshire	John Osborne Jr.	George Dawson	6th Duke of Portland	1:52.20
1889	Enthusiast	Tom Cannon, Sr.	James Ryan	Douglas Baird	1:45.20
1890	Surefoot	John Liddiard	Charles Jousiffe	Archie Merry	1:49.80
1891	Common †	George Barrett	John Porter	1st Baron Alington	1:47.00
1892	Bona Vista	Jack Robinson	William Arthur Jarvis	Charles Day Rose	1:54.00
1893	Isinglass †	Tommy Loates	James Jewitt	Harry McCalmont	1:42.40
1894	Ladas	John Watts	Mathew Dawson	5th Earl of Rosebery	1:44.20
1895	Kirkconnel	John Watts	Jos Day	Sir John Blundell Maple	1:42.40
1896	St Frusquin	Tommy Loates	Alfred Hayhoe	Leopold de Rothschild	1:43.60
1897	Galtee More †	Charles Wood	Sam Darling	John Gubbins	1:40.60
1898	Disraeli	Sam Loates	John Dawson, Sr.	Wallace Johnstone	1:41.80
1899	Flying Fox †	Morny Cannon	John Porter	1st Duke of Westminster	1:43.00
1900	Diamond Jubilee †	Herbert Jones	Richard Marsh	Prince of Wales	1:41.60
1901	Handicapper	Bill Halsey	Fred Day	Sir Ernest Cassel	1:43.00
1902	Sceptre † ‡	Herbert Randall	Bob Sievier	Bob Sievier	1:39.00
1903	Rock Sand †	Skeets Martin	George Blackwell	Sir James Miller	1:42.00
1904	St Amant	Kempton Cannon	Alfred Hayhoe	Leopold de Rothschild	1:38.80
1905	Vedas	Herbert Jones	Jack Robinson	West de Wend-Fenton	1:41.20
1906	Gorgos	Herbert Jones	Richard Marsh	Arthur James	1:43.80
1907	Slieve Gallion	Billy Higgs	Sam Darling	Henry Greer	1:41.80
1908	Norman	Otto Madden	John Watson	August Belmont Jr.	1:44.60
1909	Minoru	Herbert Jones	Richard Marsh	King Edward VII	1:37.80
1910	Neil Gow	Danny Maher	Percy Peck	5th Earl of Rosebery	1:40.40
1911	Sunstar	George Stern	Charles Morton	Jack Barnato Joel	1:37.60
1912	Sweeper	Danny Maher	Atty Persse	Herman Duryea	1:38.40
1913	Louvois	Johnny Reiff	Dawson Waugh	Walter Raphael	1:38.80
1914	Kennymore	George Stern	Alec Taylor Jr.	Sir John Thursby	1:38.00
1915	Pommern †	Steve Donoghue	Charles Peck	Solomon Joel	1:43.40
1916	Clarissimus	Jimmy Clark	Willie Waugh	7th Viscount Falmouth	1:39.60
1917	Gay Crusader †	Steve Donoghue	Alec Taylor Jr.	Alfred Cox	1:40.80
1918	Gainsborough †	Joe Childs	Alec Taylor Jr.	Lady James Douglas	1:44.60
1919	The Panther	Dick Cooper	George Manser	Sir Alec Black	1:44.40
1920	Tetratema	Brownie Carslake	Atty Persse	Dermot McCalmont	1:43.20
1921	Craig an Eran	John Brennan	Alec Taylor Jr.	2nd Viscount Astor	1:41.60
1922	St Louis	George Archibald	Peter Gilpin	1st Baron Queenborough	1:43.60
1923	Ellangowan	Charlie Elliott	Jack Jarvis	5th Earl of Rosebery	1:37.80
1924	Diophon	George Hulme	Dick Dawson	Aga Khan III	1:39.00
1925	Manna	Steve Donoghue	Fred Darling	Henry Morriss	1:39.40
1926	Colorado	Tommy Weston	George Lambton	17th Earl of Derby	1:43.60
1927	Adam's Apple	Jack Leach	Harry Cottrill	Charles Whitburn	1:38.20
1928	Flamingo	Charlie Elliott	Jack Jarvis	Sir Laurence Philipps	1:38.80
1929	Mr Jinks	Harry Beasley	Atty Persse	Dermot McCalmont	1:39.80
1930	Diolite	Freddie Fox	Fred Templeman	Sir Hugo Hirst	1:42.40
1931	Cameronian	Joe Childs	Fred Darling	Arthur Dewar	1:39.40
1932	Orwell	Bobby Jones	Joseph Lawson	Washington Singer	1:42.40
1933	Rodosto	Roger Brethès	Henry Count	Princesse de Lucinge	1:40.40
1934	Colombo	Rae Johnstone	Thomas Hogg	1st Baron Glanely	1:40.00
1935	Bahram †	Freddie Fox	Frank Butters	Aga Khan III	1:41.40
1936	Pay Up	Bobby Dick	Joseph Lawson	2nd Viscount Astor	1:39.60
1937	Le Ksar	Charles Semblat	Frank Carter	Evremond de Saint-Alary	1:44.60
1938	Pasch	Gordon Richards	Fred Darling	Henry Morriss	1:38.80
1939	Blue Peter	Eph Smith	Jack Jarvis	6th Earl of Rosebery	1:39.40
1940	Djebel	Charlie Elliott	Albert Swann	Marcel Boussac	1:42.60
1941	Lambert Simnel	Charlie Elliott	Fred Templeman	2nd Duke of Westminster	1:42.60
1942	Big Game	Gordon Richards	Fred Darling	HM King George VI	1:40.80
1943	Kingsway	Sam Wragg	Joseph Lawson	Alfred Saunders	1:37.60
1944	Garden Path ‡	Harry Wragg	Walter Earl	17th Earl of Derby	1:39.60
1945	Court Martial	Cliff Richards	Joseph Lawson	2nd Viscount Astor	1:40.80
1946	Happy Knight	Tommy Weston	Henri Jelliss	Sir William Cooke	1:38.20
1947	Tudor Minstrel	Gordon Richards	Fred Darling	Arthur Dewar	1:37.80
1948	My Babu	Charlie Smirke	Sam Armstrong	Maharaja of Baroda	1:35.80
1949	Nimbus	Charlie Elliott	George Colling	Marion Glenister	1:38.00
1950	Palestine	Charlie Smirke	Marcus Marsh	Aga Khan III	1:36.80
1951	Ki Ming	Scobie Breasley	Michael Beary	Ley On	1:42.00
1952	Thunderhead	Roger Poincelet	Etienne Pollet	Eugène Constant	1:42.48
1953	Nearula	Edgar Britt	Charles Elsey	William Humble	1:38.26
1954	Darius	Manny Mercer	Harry Wragg	Sir Percy Loraine	1:39.45
1955	Our Babu	Doug Smith	Geoffrey Brooke	David Robinson	1:38.83
1956	Gilles de Retz	Frank Barlow	Helen Johnson Houghton (Note: Gilles de Retz was officially trained by Charles Jerdein as the Jockey Club would not allow women to hold a trainers' licence in 1956)	Anthony Samuel	1:38.76
1957	Crepello	Lester Piggott	Noel Murless	Sir Victor Sassoon	1:38.24
1958	Pall Mall	Doug Smith	Cecil Boyd-Rochfort	Queen Elizabeth II	1:39.43
1959	Taboun	George Moore	Alec Head	Prince Aly Khan	1:42.42
1960	Martial	Ron Hutchinson	Paddy Prendergast	Reginald Webster	1:38.33
1961	Rockavon	Norman Stirk	George Boyd	Thomas Yuill	1:39.46
1962	Privy Councillor	Bill Rickaby	Tom Waugh	Gerald Glover	1:38.74
1963	Only for Life	Jimmy Lindley	Jeremy Tree	Monica Sheriffe	1:45.00
1964	Baldric	Bill Pyers	Ernie Fellows	Mrs Howell Jackson	1:38.44
1965	Niksar	Duncan Keith	Walter Nightingall	Wilfred Harvey	1:43.31
1966	Kashmir	Jimmy Lindley	Mick Bartholomew	Peter Butler	1:40.68
1967	Royal Palace	George Moore	Noel Murless	Jim Joel	1:39.37
1968	Sir Ivor	Lester Piggott	Vincent O'Brien	Raymond Guest	1:39.26
1969	Right Tack	Geoff Lewis	John Sutcliffe Jr.	Jim Brown	1:41.65
1970	Nijinsky †	Lester Piggott	Vincent O'Brien	Charles Engelhard	1:41.54
1971	Brigadier Gerard	Joe Mercer	Dick Hern	Jean Hislop	1:39.20
1972	High Top	Willie Carson	Bernard van Cutsem	Sir Jules Thorn	1:40.82
1973	Mon Fils	Frankie Durr	Richard Hannon Sr.	Brenda Davis	1:42.97
1974	Nonoalco	Yves Saint-Martin	François Boutin	María Félix Berger	1:39.58
1975	Bolkonski	Gianfranco Dettori	Henry Cecil	Carlo d'Alessio	1:39.49
1976	Wollow	Gianfranco Dettori	Henry Cecil	Carlo d'Alessio	1:38.09
1977	Nebbiolo	Gabriel Curran	Kevin Prendergast	Niels Schibbye	1:38.54
1978	Roland Gardens	Frankie Durr	Duncan Sasse	John Hayter	1:47.33
1979	Tap On Wood	Steve Cauthen	Barry Hills	Tony Shead	1:43.60
1980	Known Fact (Note: Nureyev finished first in 1980, but he was relegated to last place following a stewards' inquiry)	Willie Carson	Jeremy Tree	Khalid Abdullah	1:40.46
1981	To-Agori-Mou	Greville Starkey	Guy Harwood	Andry Muinos	1:41.43
1982	Zino	Freddy Head	François Boutin	Gerry Oldham	1:37.13
1983	Lomond	Pat Eddery	Vincent O'Brien	Robert Sangster	1:43.87
1984	El Gran Senor	Pat Eddery	Vincent O'Brien	Robert Sangster	1:37.41
1985	Shadeed	Lester Piggott	Michael Stoute	Maktoum Al Maktoum	1:37.41
1986	Dancing Brave	Greville Starkey	Guy Harwood	Khalid Abdullah	1:40.00
1987	Don't Forget Me	Willie Carson	Richard Hannon Sr.	James Horgan	1:36.74
1988	Doyoun	Walter Swinburn	Michael Stoute	Aga Khan IV	1:41.73
1989	Nashwan	Willie Carson	Dick Hern	Hamdan Al Maktoum	1:36.44
1990	Tirol	Michael Kinane	Richard Hannon Sr.	John Horgan	1:35.84
1991	Mystiko	Michael Roberts	Clive Brittain	Lady Beaverbrook	1:37.83
1992	Rodrigo de Triano	Lester Piggott	Peter Chapple-Hyam	Robert Sangster	1:38.37
1993	Zafonic	Pat Eddery	André Fabre	Khalid Abdullah	1:35.32
1994	Mister Baileys	Jason Weaver	Mark Johnston	G. R. Bailey Ltd	1:35.08
1995	Pennekamp	Thierry Jarnet	André Fabre	Sheikh Mohammed	1:35.16
1996	Mark of Esteem	Frankie Dettori	Saeed bin Suroor	Godolphin	1:37.59
1997	Entrepreneur	Michael Kinane	Michael Stoute	Tabor / Magnier	1:35.64
1998	King of Kings	Michael Kinane	Aidan O'Brien	Magnier / Tabor	1:39.25
1999 (Note: The 1999 running took place on Newmarket's July Course)	Island Sands	Frankie Dettori	Saeed bin Suroor	Godolphin	1:37.14
2000	King's Best	Kieren Fallon	Sir Michael Stoute	Saeed Suhail	1:37.77
2001	Golan	Kieren Fallon	Sir Michael Stoute	Lord Weinstock	1:37.48
2002	Rock of Gibraltar	Johnny Murtagh	Aidan O'Brien	Ferguson / Magnier	1:36.50
2003	Refuse to Bend	Pat Smullen	Dermot Weld	Moyglare Stud Farm	1:37.98
2004	Haafhd	Richard Hills	Barry Hills	Hamdan Al Maktoum	1:36.64
2005	Footstepsinthesand	Kieren Fallon	Aidan O'Brien	Tabor / Magnier	1:36.10
2006	George Washington	Kieren Fallon	Aidan O'Brien	Magnier / Tabor / Smith	1:36.86
2007	Cockney Rebel	Olivier Peslier	Geoff Huffer	Phil Cunningham	1:35.28
2008	Henrythenavigator	Johnny Murtagh	Aidan O'Brien	Sue Magnier	1:39.14
2009	Sea the Stars	Michael Kinane	John Oxx	Christopher Tsui	1:35.88
2010	Makfi	Christophe Lemaire	Mikel Delzangles	Mathieu Offenstadt	1:36.35
2011	Frankel	Tom Queally	Henry Cecil	Khalid Abdullah	1:37.30
2012	Camelot	Joseph O'Brien	Aidan O'Brien	Smith / Magnier / Tabor	1:42.46
2013	Dawn Approach	Kevin Manning	Jim Bolger	Godolphin	1:35.84
2014	Night of Thunder	Kieren Fallon	Richard Hannon Jr.	Saeed Manana	1:36.61
2015	Gleneagles	Ryan Moore	Aidan O'Brien	Smith / Magnier / Tabor	1:37.55
2016	Galileo Gold	Frankie Dettori	Hugo Palmer	Al Shaqab Racing	1:35.91
2017	Churchill	Ryan Moore	Aidan O'Brien	Smith / Magnier / Tabor	1:36.61
2018	Saxon Warrior	Donnacha O'Brien	Aidan O'Brien	Smith / Magnier / Tabor	1:36.55
2019	Magna Grecia	Donnacha O'Brien	Aidan O'Brien	Smith / Magnier / Tabor	1:36.84
2020 (Note: The 2020 race was run in June due to the COVID-19 pandemic in the United Kingdom)	Kameko	Oisin Murphy	Andrew Balding	Qatar Racing	1:34.72
2021	Poetic Flare	Kevin Manning	Jim Bolger	Jackie Bolger	1:35.69
2022	Coroebus	James Doyle	Charlie Appleby	Godolphin	1:36.27
2023	Chaldean	Frankie Dettori	Andrew Balding	Juddmonte	1:41.64
2024	Notable Speech	William Buick	Charlie Appleby	Godolphin	1:37.21
2025	Ruling Court	William Buick	Charlie Appleby	Godolphin	1:37.28
2026	Bow Echo	Billy Loughnane	George Boughey	Exors Of The Late Sheikh Mohammed Obaid	1:35.59

† designates a Triple Crown Winner.
‡ designates a filly.

== See also ==
- Horse racing in Great Britain
- List of British flat horse races
