= George Blackwell (horse racing) =

British racehorse trainer (1861–1942)

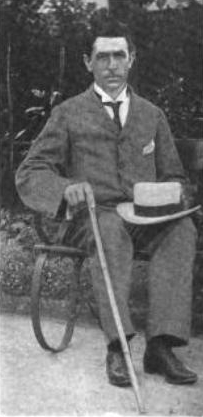
- In The Sketch, 6 May 1903
- Born: 1861; Cambridge, Cambridgeshire, England
- Died: 16 September 1942 (aged 80–81); Newmarket, Suffolk, England
- Occupation: Racehorse trainer

George Blackwell (1861–1942) was a British racehorse trainer. He was Champion Trainer in 1903, and is one of the few trainers to have trained both an Epsom Derby winner (Rock Sand, 1903) and a Grand National winner (Sergeant Murphy, 1923).

== Biography ==
George Blackwell was born in Cambridge in 1861.

He died at his home in Newmarket, Suffolk, on 16 September 1942.
