= Bend-Or spots =

Type of spotted marking on horses

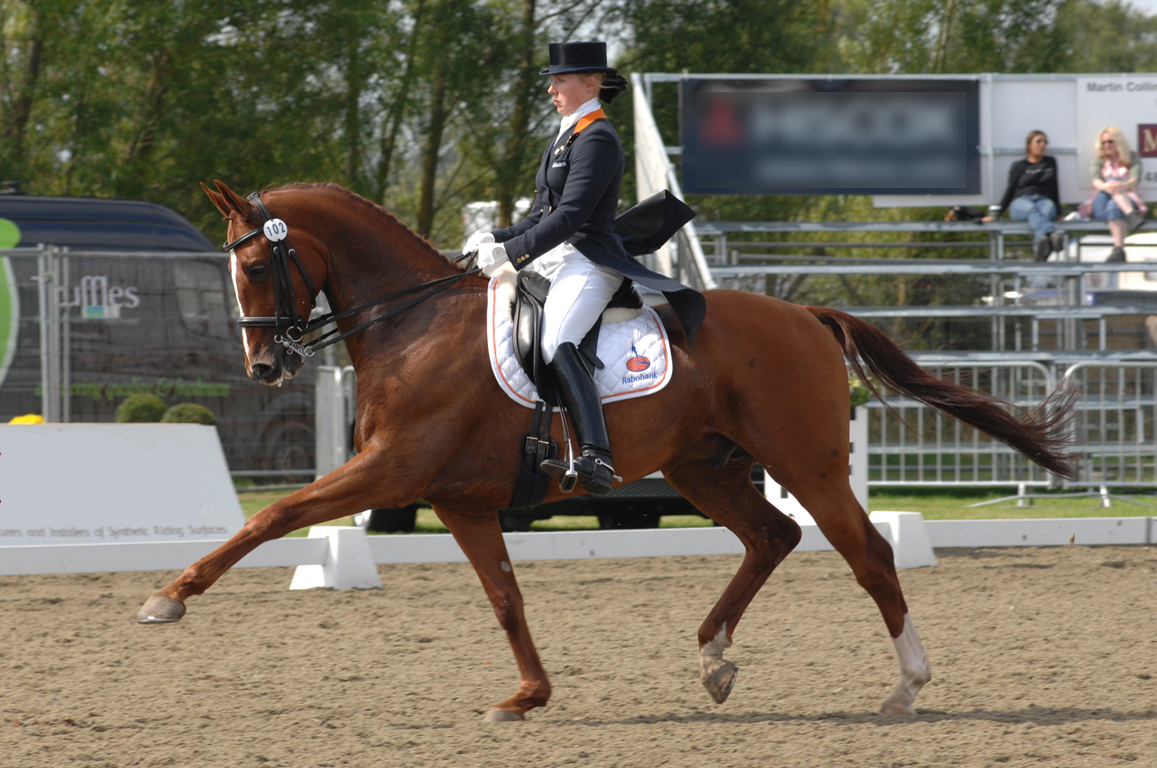
The three round dark spots on this horse's hindquarters, one behind the flank and two near the gaskin, appear to be Bend-Or spots. (click image to enlarge)

Bend-Or spots (also called Bend Or spots, smuts, or grease spots) are a type of spotted marking found on horses. They range in color from dark red to black. These random spots are most commonly seen on palominos, chestnuts, and darker horses, and may not appear until the horse is several years old. Bend Or spots occur in breeds with chestnut coloration, and most chestnuts seem to have at least one. It is still unknown what causes these markings, as they do not appear to be related to other spotting patterns. However, they may have some connection to the sooty trait. More may appear as the horse ages.

Unrelated patterns may be confused with Bend-Or spots. Some roan horses have patches of darker hairs called "corn marks" or "corn spots." While these resemble Bend-Or spots, they are linked to solid-colored hair growing in over minor cuts or scratches to the skin, and thus the underlying genetic cause appears to be unrelated. Another pattern seen primarily in some gray horses is dappling, the presence of darker hairs in round shapes against a lighter hair coat. However, dapples are an intermediate stage of the graying process, and will only last a few years.

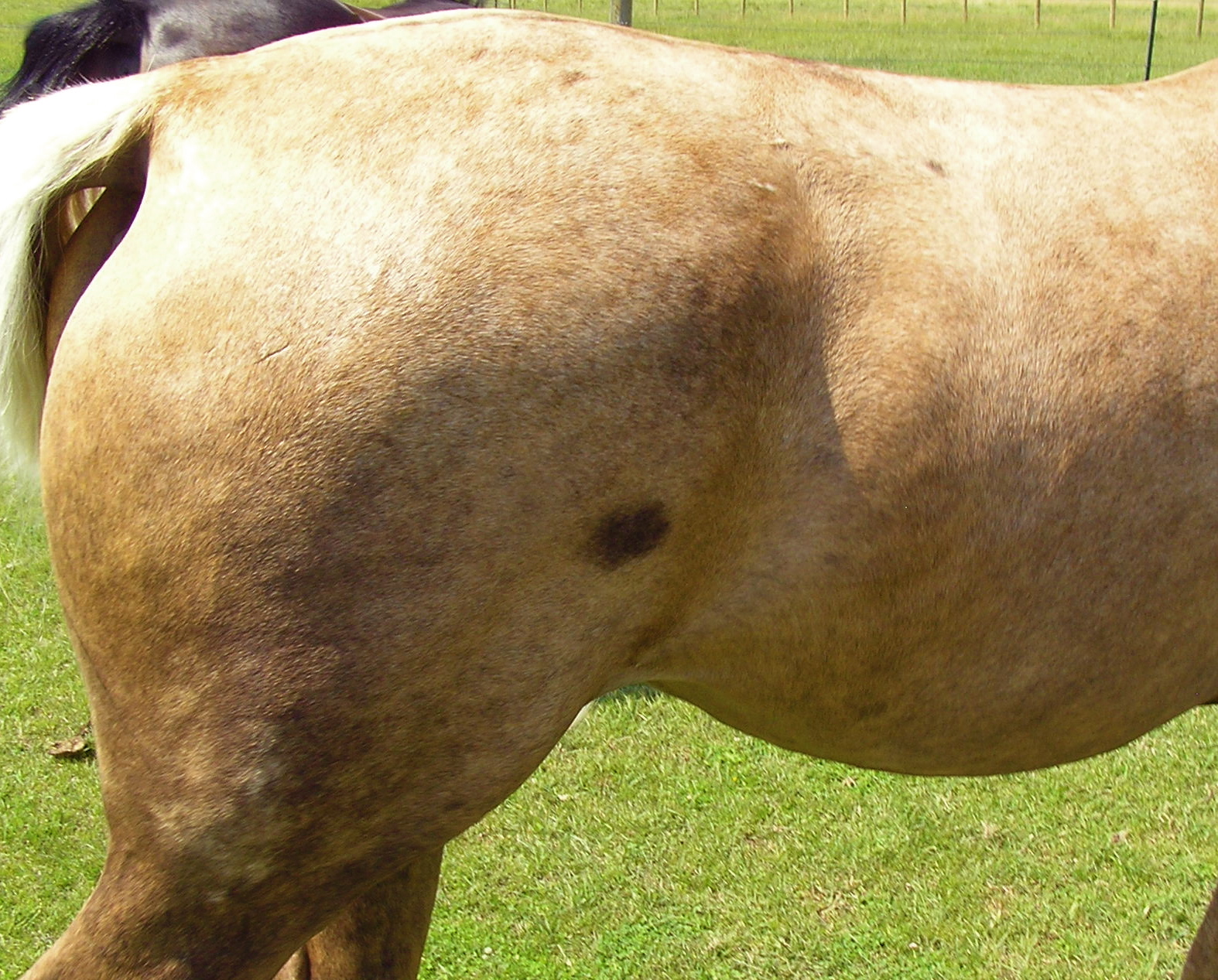
A Bend-Or spot near the flank of a palomino horse

These markings were named after the Thoroughbred stallion Bend Or, a chestnut who had such spots. Bend Or's pedigree includes several horses with such spots.

== See also ==
- Horse markings
