= The Baron (horse) =

Irish-bred Thoroughbred racehorse

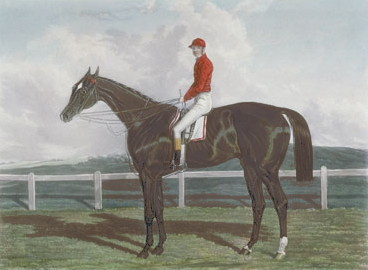
- Sire: Birdcatcher
- Grandsire: Sir Hercules
- Dam: Echidna
- Damsire: Economist
- Sex: Stallion
- Foaled: 1842
- Died: 1860 (aged 17–18)
- Country: Ireland
- Colour: Dark Chestnut
- Breeder: George Watts of Dublin
- Owner: 1) George Watts; 2) John Scott; 3) Edward Rawson Clark; 4) John Theobald; 5) Perrot de Thaunberg
- Trainer: John Scott

Major wins
- Madrid Stakes (1845); Kirwan Stakes (1845); Waterford Stakes (1845); St. Leger Stakes (1845); Cesarewitch Handicap (1845)
- Last updated on 29 September 2011

The Baron (1842–1860) was a Thoroughbred racehorse from Ireland, who also raced in England. Sired by Birdcatcher out of Echidna (by the English stallion Economist), he was also an influential sire in England, France and Australia.

== Racing career ==
A dark chestnut colt with a star, snip, and white sock on his near (left) hind leg, The Baron won three of his four starts at the Curragh in Ireland as a three-year-old before being shipped to England in 1845 by his breeder, veterinary surgeon George Watts. He was then sold to John Scott with whom he won the 1¾-mile St. Leger Stakes and the 2¼-mile Cesarewitch Handicap, the latter under 7 st 9 lb (107 pounds or 49 kilograms) for 3,200 guineas. This was the largest purse ever awarded a three-year-old up to that time. The Baron was then purchased by Edward Rawson Clark.

The Baron raced as a four-year-old in 1846, but did not perform well and suffered from bad feet. Clark sold him to John Mytton, a gambler; after he left Scott, The Baron never won another race. His best result was a second-place finish in the 1846 Craven Stakes at Epsom Downs.

== Stud record ==
He was given in partial payment to the breeder John Theobald, who stood him at Stockwell Stud. After Theobald's death, The Baron was sold to Perrot de Thaunberg of France's National Stud. There he sired many Thoroughbreds, including:

- Baronella (1861) won Poule d'Essai des Poulains (French 2,000 Guineas)
- Dame D'Honneur, won Prix de Diane
- Etoile Du Nord, Prix de Diane
- Isabella, FR Two Thousand Guineas and Grand Critérium
- La Toucques (1860), won the French St. Leger Stakes, the Prix du Jockey Club, and the Grosser Preis von Baden.
- Rataplan, Doncaster Cup, won 42 races, a noted broodmare sire
- Stockwell, winner of the 2,000 Guineas, Newmarket Stakes, Great Yorkshire Stakes, St. Leger Stakes, etc.; a leading sire, his progeny included Doncaster and St. Albans.(GB )
- Tonnerre Des Indes, won Grand Critérium

Rataplan and Stockwell were full brothers out of the same dam, Pocahontas.

The Baron was known as "The slim and savage" Baron, due to his terrible temperament. Despite rough treatment at his French stud, he had a great influence on French Thoroughbred bloodlines; several of his progeny were also exported to Australia. The Baron died in 1860.

== Pedigree ==
Pedigree of The Baron (IRE), chestnut stallion, 1842
Sire Birdcatcher 1833	Sir Hercules; 1826	Whalebone	Waxy*
Sire Birdcatcher 1833	Sir Hercules; 1826	Whalebone	Penelope*
Sire Birdcatcher 1833	Sir Hercules; 1826	Peri	Wanderer
Sire Birdcatcher 1833	Sir Hercules; 1826	Peri	Thalestris
Sire Birdcatcher 1833	Guiccioli; 1823	Bob Booty	Chanticleer
Sire Birdcatcher 1833	Guiccioli; 1823	Bob Booty	Ierne
Sire Birdcatcher 1833	Guiccioli; 1823	Flight	Escape
Sire Birdcatcher 1833	Guiccioli; 1823	Flight	Young Heroine
Dam Echidna 1838	Economist; 1825	Whisker	Waxy*
Dam Echidna 1838	Economist; 1825	Whisker	Penelope*
Dam Echidna 1838	Economist; 1825	Floranthe	Octavian
Dam Echidna 1838	Economist; 1825	Floranthe	Caprice
Dam Echidna 1838	Miss Pratt; 1825	Blacklock	Whitelock
Dam Echidna 1838	Miss Pratt; 1825	Blacklock	Coriander Mare
Dam Echidna 1838	Miss Pratt; 1825	Gadabout	Orville
Dam Echidna 1838	Miss Pratt; 1825	Gadabout	Minstrel (Family 24)

* The Baron is inbred 4S x 4D to the stallion Waxy, meaning that he appears fourth generation on the sire side of his pedigree, and fourth generation on the dam side of his pedigree.

* The Baron is inbred 4S x 4D to the mare Penelope, meaning that she appears fourth generation on the sire side of his pedigree, and fourth generation on the dam side of his pedigree.

== See also ==
- Doncaster (horse)
- John Scott (horseman)
- Stockwell (horse)
