= Caroline Beresford, Duchess of Montrose =

British racehorse owner and aristocrat

Her Grace The Duchess of Montrose
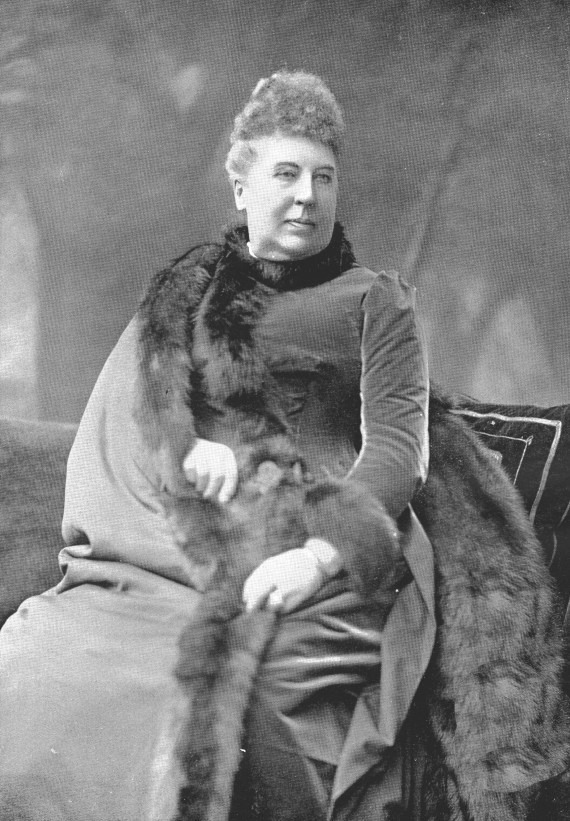
- Caroline Beresford
- Born: 21 August 1818
- Died: 16 November 1894 (aged 76)
- Spouse: James Graham, 4th Duke of Montrose (m. 1836; died 1874)
- Children: Douglas Graham, 5th Duke of Montrose; Violet, Lady Greville
- Parent(s): John Beresford, 2nd Baron Decies; Charlotte Horsley
- Relatives: Beresford family (see Baron Decies and Marquess of Waterford)

Caroline Agnes Graham, Duchess of Montrose (née Beresford; 21 August 1818 – 16 November 1894), styled Dowager Duchess of Montrose after 1874, was a notable British racehorse owner, aristocrat, and socialite.

She was described as a "wildly extravagant woman" who "strode across the racing scene", and was popularly known as the "Red Duchess", from both her scarlet racing colours and her habit of dressing from head to foot in that colour at race meetings. It was said of her in one of her obituaries that "few women in England create more stir in all classes of society". She betted heavily, hardly ever missed attending a race meeting where her horses were competing, and associated almost exclusively with followers of the turf.

== Origins ==
The Duchess of Montrose in 1860, photographed by Camille Silvy

Arms of Beresford of Decies

She was a daughter of John Beresford, 2nd Baron Decies by his wife Charlotte Philadelphia Horsley, only daughter and heiress of Robert Horsley, of Bolam, Northumberland. Her grandfather was William Beresford, 1st Baron Decies, Archbishop of Tuam, third son of Marcus Beresford, 1st Earl of Tyrone and younger brother of George Beresford, 1st Marquess of Waterford. One of her brothers was William Horsley Beresford, 3rd Baron Decies.

She proved herself a true scion of this famous Irish stock, the harum scarum (i.e. reckless, impetuous) family of Beresford; she lived up fully to its reputation for eccentricity as well as equestrian prowess. "The Beresfords had all profited immensely from the Irish Church. Twenty-eight of them were pensioned on its revenues, receiving nearly $5,000,000 but the Decies had the richest pickings. The first Baron Decies was Archbishop of Tuam, which paid him $1,000,000 and both his younger sons got a fat thing from the church". "At an early age she developed a reputation for her beauty, her reckless, and her risqué doings". Her sister Louisa Elizabeth Horsley Beresford married Ernest Brudenell-Bruce, 3rd Marquess of Ailesbury.

== Queen Victoria controversy ==
In 1839 at Royal Ascot, aged 21 and in co-ordination with several other noble ladies, including her mother in law Caroline Montagu (Duchess of Montrose), she hissed at the young Queen Victoria (in her second year as queen) in disapproval at the queen's role in the scandal over the recently deceased Lady Flora Hastings, a young unmarried lady-in-waiting who had been falsely accused by the royal household of having become pregnant by a Tory courtier disliked by the queen. Lady Flora's belly had swelled which caused the queen to order a medical examination, which found that Lady Flora was still a virgin and that the rumours were false. The queen apologised to Lady Flora. The actual cause was an undiagnosed liver tumor of which she soon died. The Hastings family, prominent Tories, launched a public campaign against the young queen and her favoured Whig prime minister Lord Melbourne, and portrayed Flora as the "victim of a depraved court", with the queen "dabbling in party politics".

== Marriages and issue ==
She married thrice:

- Firstly in 1836, aged 18, to James Graham, 4th Duke of Montrose, of Buchanan Castle in Stirlingshire (re-built by him in 1852) and 45 Belgrave Square in London, a Scottish nobleman by whom she was the mother of Douglas Beresford Graham, 5th Duke of Montrose. She and her first husband were both survivors of the train involved in the Atherstone rail accident of 1860. They had six children, of whom only three reached adulthood.
- Secondly in 1876, aged 58, she married the Scottish aristocrat and millionaire William Stuart Stirling-Crawfurd, of Milton in Lanarkshire, Scotland, a prominent racehorse owner who in 1850 had been elected a member of the Jockey Club, the regulating body of British horseracing. He was the patron of the racehorse trainer Alec Taylor, Senior, whom he financed in 1870 in the creation of the now famous Manton training stables on the Marlborough Downs in Wiltshire, which Taylor established as his base. The marriage was very happy, as both parties shared the same passion for the turf and were of similar age. She continued to use the title "Duchess of Montrose" for the rest of her life. The marriage was without issue. He died in 1883 at his house in Cannes, South of France, without issue. After his death she "apparently resolved to devote the remainder of her life to two objects: the winning of races and the erection of a magnificent and costly mausoleum in his memory".
- Thirdly in 1888, aged 70, she remarried to a 24-year-old junior stockbroker Marcus Henry Milner, a racehorse trainer, soldier and cricketer 46 years her junior, and a cousin, both being descended from her great-grandfather Marcus Beresford, 1st Earl of Tyrone. The age difference was regarded as a scandal and press reactions at the news included "it is impossible to conceive the astonishment created in London society by the announcement of the marriage ... it would be impertinent to enquire whether Mr Milner had fallen in love with the Duchess or with her money". She settled an income of £5,000 per annum on him (equivalent to £654,163 in 2020). Her family "cordially detested him". They briefly separated in September 1893 but were reconciled in December. He later had a successful military career, and was decorated with the MVO, DSO and Belgian Croix de Guerre.

== Career on the turf ==
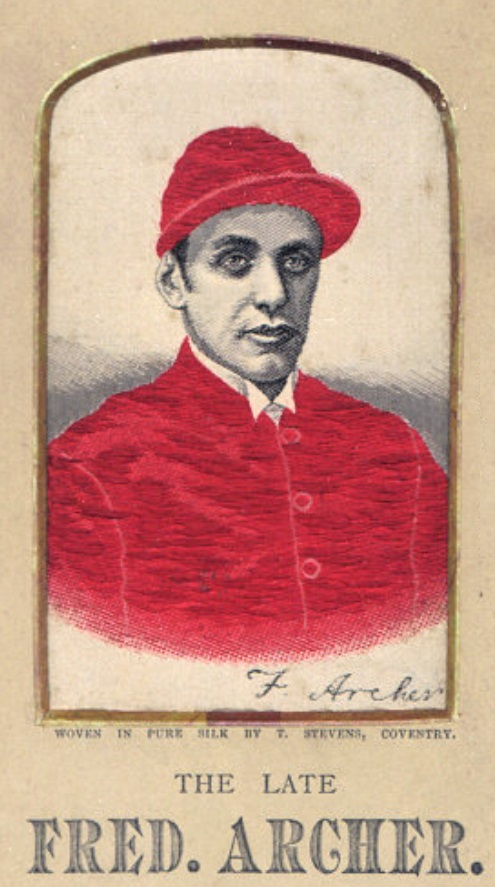
Silk-woven portrait of Fred Archer (1857–1886), described as "the best all-round jockey that the turf has ever seen", wearing the racing colours Scarlet jacket and cap of "Mr Manton" (Dowager Duchess of Montrose). It was rumoured that she proposed marriage to him after his wife died in 1884

Her second husband Stirling-Crawfurd moved his horses from Manton to the Bedford Lodge stables on the Bury Road in Newmarket (headquarters of the British horseracing industry) in Suffolk, under the trainer Joe Dawson. In 1883 he moved his horses south across the road to Bellevue Lodge, the lease of which he acquired from the prominent French racehorse owner Claude Joachim Lefèvre, whose French racing operations were based at Chamant, L'Oise, where he built a model stud, and after 1870 at Dangu in Normandy. Lefèvre built Bellevue in 1872 in "a picturesque Italian style" and in 1873 had set a record as a racehorse owner by winning 110 races in a season. The Duchess renamed it "Sefton Lodge" after Stirling-Crawfurd's 1878 Derby winner "Sefton". It was a large house, with adjacent stables, backing onto the Bury Side training grounds, which in about 1883 was enlarged in the same style by Stirling-Crawfurd and his wife. Following the death of her second husband in 1883, for a while she took personal management of his racehorses. She then hired a succession of managers, including Captain James Octavius Machell of Bedford Lodge Stables, Newmarket, and Sir John Willoughby, 5th Baronet, but having parted company with both she again took on personal management under the name "Mr Manton", as at that time women were not allowed under the Jockey Club rules of racing to own racehorses. Such pseudonyms had been used before to circumvent Jockey Club rules, for example before 1870 by Sir George Chetwynd, 4th Baronet (1849–1917), who raced whilst under age as "Mr Mortimer". Lastly her horses were managed by her son the 5th Duke of Montrose. "Almost every jockey of recognized ability had at some time or another ridden in her colours, but she had quarreled with nearly every one of them." In 1793 she sold her racing stable at Sefton House. On 25 March 2018, by an historic coincidence, it was reported that "There were emotional scenes at Sefton Lodge Stables in Newmarket on Sunday as Martyn Meade (a prominent trainer) went through the six-hour process of moving his entire operation to Manton in Wiltshire"'.

== Builds St Agnes's Church ==
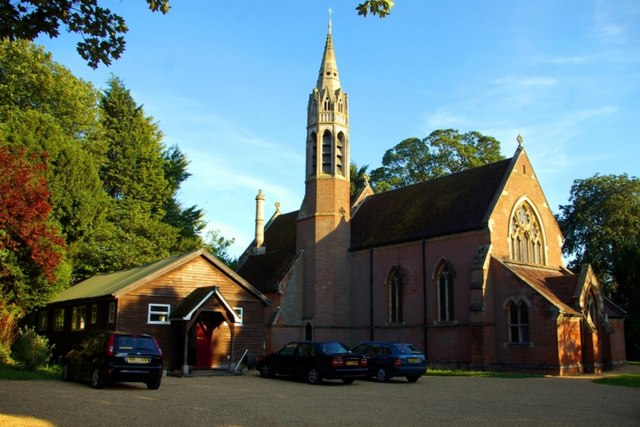
St Agnes' Church, Newmarket, viewed from north. Built in 1886 in memory of Stirling-Crawfurd by his widow the Duchess of Montrose, next to his burial place 160 metres north-east of Sefton Lodge, their Newmarket racing headquarters

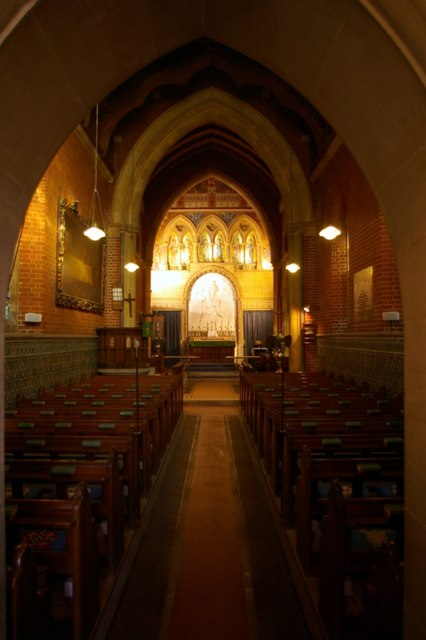
Interior of St Agnes's Church, Newmarket. Suggestive of an Italian chapel with majolica tiles and mosaics over the altar. Probably the most elaborate example of this High Victorian style in Suffolk At left "an oil painting of the Last Supper in a fine late seventeenth century frame"

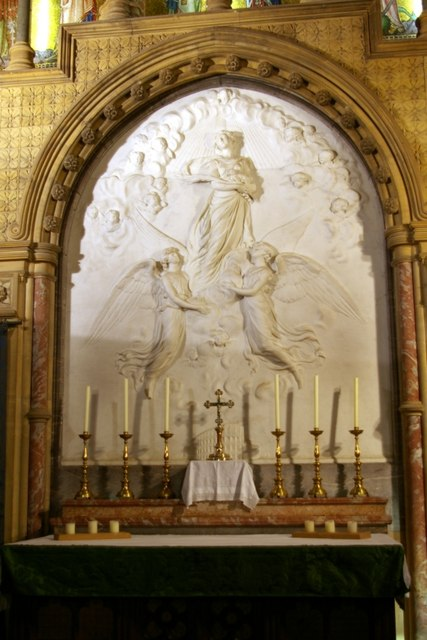
Reredos by Joseph Boehm in the Renaissance manner, depicting the assumption of Saint Agnes surrounded by cherubs in clouds; Church of St Agnes, Newmarket

Her second husband Stirling-Crawfurd died in 1883 at his house in Cannes, South of France, and in 1885 was re-interred by his widow in the grounds of their home and racing headquarters Sefton Lodge, on the south side of the Bury Road, Newmarket, under the surviving large cross 160 metres north-west of the house. One year later in 1886, in his memory the Duchess commissioned the architect Richard Herbert Carpenter (1841–1893) to build a church next to his burial place, dedicated to Saint Agnes (the Duchess's second Christian name) and with a capacity for about 100 worshippers. It was then situated within the parish of Exning and on 8 October 1887 was consecrated by Lord Alwyne Compton, Bishop of Ely (in the diocese of whom was situated Exning parish), the fourth son of Spencer Compton, 2nd Marquess of Northampton. In her role as patroness of the church the Duchess presented the Rev. Alfred Sharpe to the Bishop to become the first vicar, who was soon replaced in 1888 by Rev. William Colville-Wallis (1854–1938) of Emmanuel College, Cambridge, who remained vicar until 1935, three years before his death at Osborne House, and was buried at St Agnes. St Agnes remained as an independent parish until 1966 when at last, after much resistance, it was amalgamated with St Mary's.

In the Decorated Gothic style, in red brick with dressings of limestone with elaborate tile and mosaic work, it is an "exceptional example of a high Victorian Church" and is now classed as a grade II* listed building. It is said to have the richest, most opulent 19th century interior in Suffolk, The listing text states

the interior walling of fair-face red brick with limestone dressings. A dado of majolica tiling throughout the nave and chapel. The entire wall face of the sanctuary is richly decorated, with several elements in a variety of materials: a marble reredos by Joseph Boehm in the Renaissance manner, depicting the assumption of Saint Agnes surrounded by cherubs in clouds; about its arched head, a triple arcade of limestone around and within which are figures of saints in richly-coloured Salviati mosaic. Practically all windows have stained glass figures of saints by Clayton and Bell.

The church has since been the favoured choice for Sunday worship for the Anglican high-society Newmarket racing circle. As patroness of the church which she had built, she had the power to hire and fire the vicar. The following story is told:

The weather during one summer had been atrocious which suited the duchess, if no-one else, as she had a runner in the St Leger which had any sort of chance only on very soft ground. She was horrified when, one Sunday, the Rev. Colville-Wallis led his congregation in praying for a fine spell so farmers could gather in the harvest. She took him to one side afterwards and told him: "Do that again, and I'll sack you". The horse did not win, but the vicar kept his job.

Indeed, having been appointed by the Duchess in 1888, he remained vicar until 1935, three years before his death. The story is embellished in various sources, for example in his Australian obituary "Duchess and Vicar: When a Prayer Offended": "The Duchess of Montrose got up from her pew and walked out of the church. Later she sent for the vicar and asked him how he dared pray for fine weather in her church when he knew perfectly well it would ruin the prospects of her horse. The Duchess is reputed to have said: "I shall not allow you to preach in my church again".

== Character ==
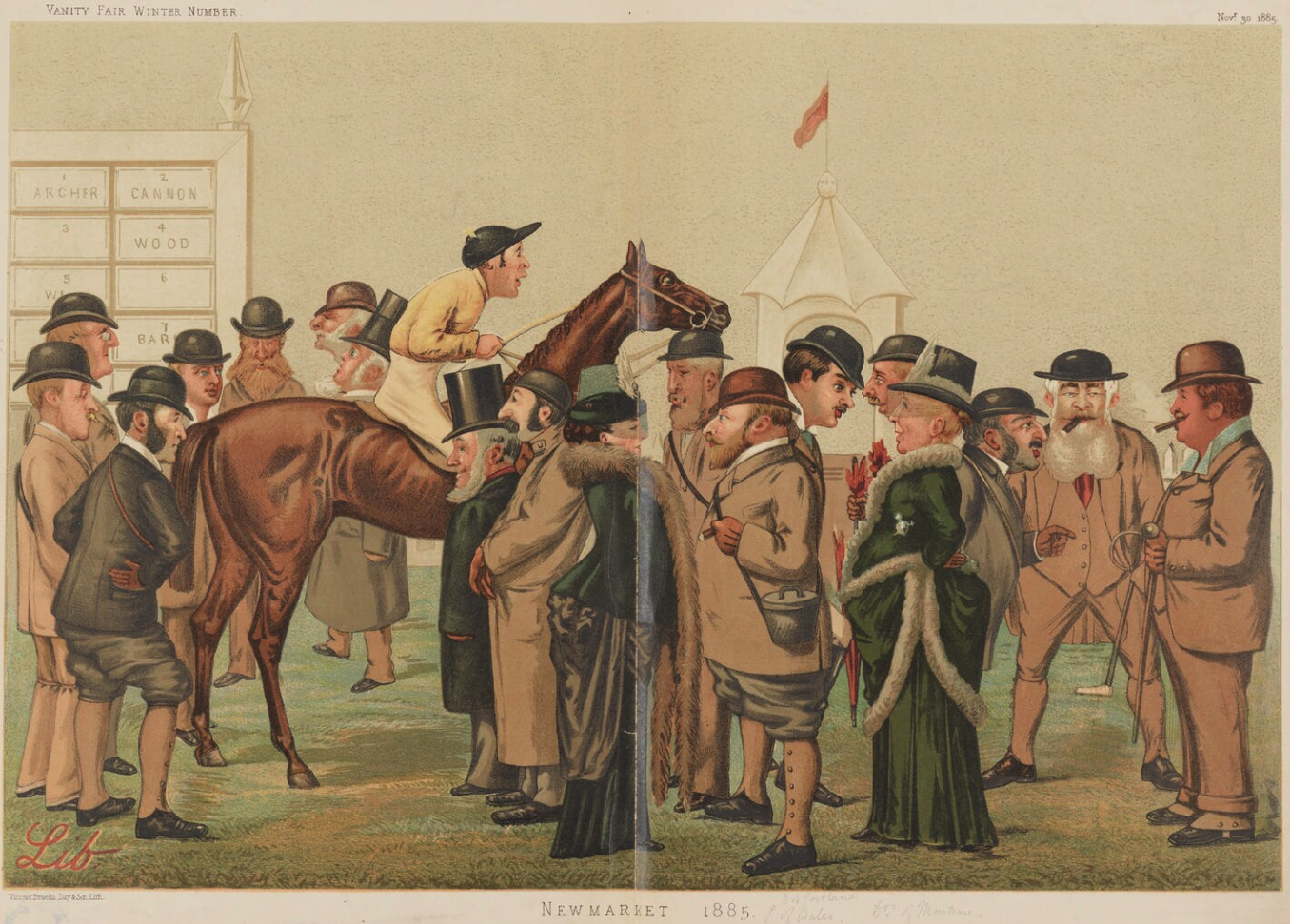
"Newmarket 1885", caricature by Liborio Prosperi published in Vanity Fair 1885. Persons portrayed include the Prince of Wales (future King Edward VII), the jockey Fred Archer, and at right the Duchess of Montrose

Contemporary anecdotes of the Duchess include: "The Duchess was a very plain-spoken woman, and could swear roundly at a peccant jockey when she deemed that his unskillful riding demanded such verbal correction. She was cordially disliked by nine-tenths of the knights of the pigskin, and although she always liberally rewarded those Jockeys who rode her horses to victory, more than one rider 'begged to be excused' when invited to don the Manton colors".

The position the Dowager Duchess of Montrose held in society is not easy to define. Everybody, from the Prince of Wales to the tiniest mite of a light-weight rider, knew her on a race course. The Prince was to be seen at her side, hat in hand, congratulating her after the all-scarlet had just flashed past the post a winner, while the mite in passing would raise his forefinger to the peak of his cap with a 'Glad your Grace won'. Into society proper, that exclusive circle which tolerates neither eccentricity nor vulgarity if exhibited to the world at large, the Duchess went but little - for the best of all possible reasons - she received but few invitations.

"The duchess was popular in the racing world, but had an acid tongue at times. She hated all handicappers, convinced that they always treated her horses unfairly. She called one, “The man who murdered his mother.” Some of her trainers did not fare much better. At one point she had horses trained by a certain Mr Peace at Lambourn, whom she described as 'the Peace that passeth all understanding'. (Philippians 4:7). A press report of 1888 stated:

Although she is a very grand dame to the very tips of her fingers, her appearance and her dress are very extraordinary. She is accustomed to call a spade a spade, to swear and curse like a trooper at times, and to thoroughly maintain her reputation for eccentricity. Her fat and red face and dyed blonde hair are familiar figures on every racecourse, where she is known by her racing name of Mr Manton. Like old Lady Ailesbury (i.e. her sister) she is full of fun and good nature and an immense favourite at all the country houses ... her style of dress is exceedingly masculine and horsey and she displays a great fondness for loud colours.

== Death ==
She died in 1894 at her London home, 45 Belgrave Square, formerly the property of her first husband the Duke of Montrose, and was buried next to her second husband in the churchyard of St Agnes's Church in Newmarket, built by her as his monument. Her possessions were removed from Belgrave Square and Sefton Lodge and sold at auction by Christie's, including her collections of "books and manuscripts, pictures (including engravings after the works of Landseer), silver & silver-gilt plate, miniatures, gold boxes, etuis, fans, other objects of vertu, the casket of jewels, porcelain, old French and other decorative objects and furniture".
