= Charles Joachim Lefèvre =

French racehorse owner

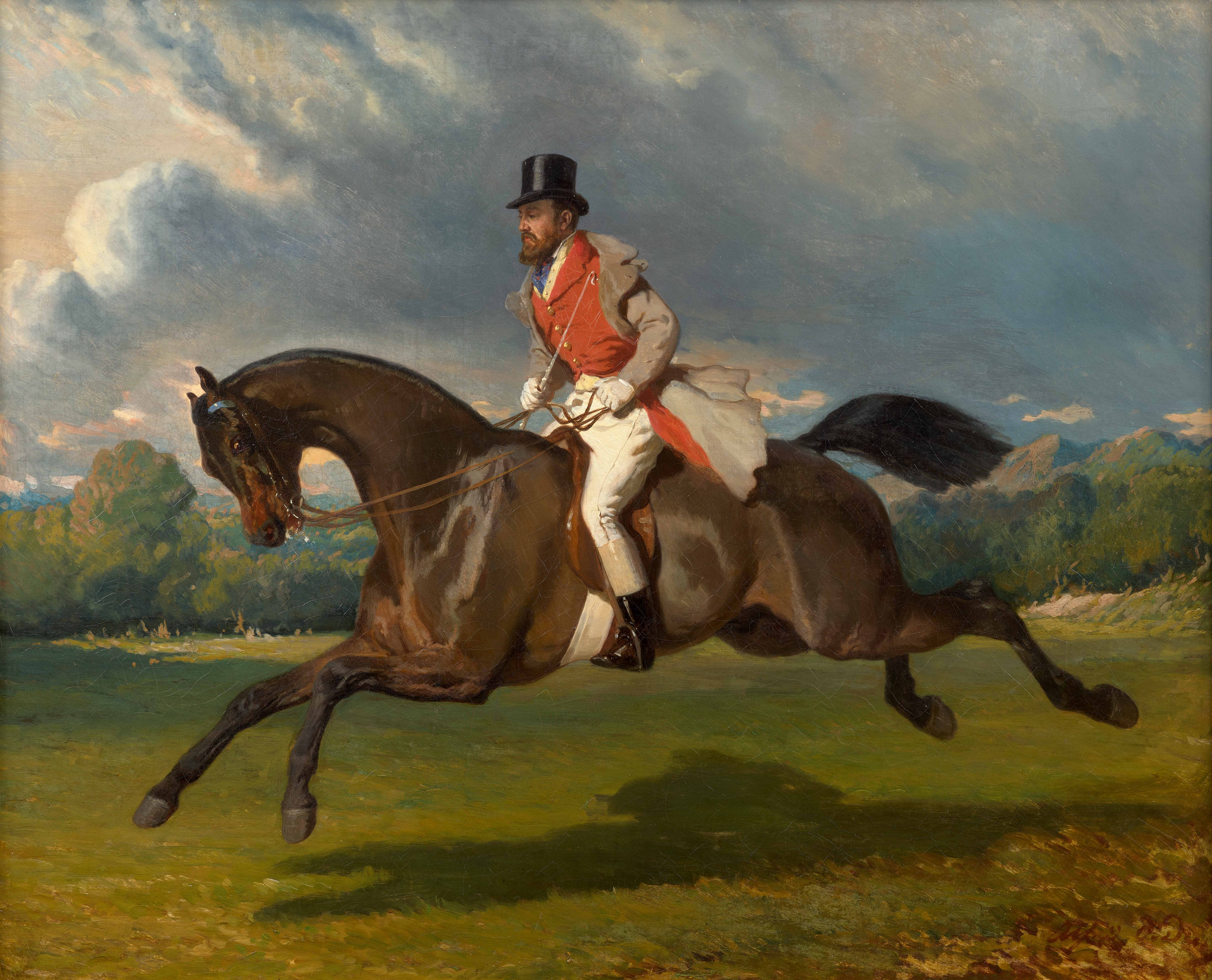
Charles Joachim Lefèvre au grand galop, portrait c.1853/5 by Alfred de Dreux (1810-1860)

Charles Joachim Lefèvre (Paris 1826-Paris 1896) was a prominent French racehorse owner whose French racing operations were based at Chamant, L'Oise, where he built a model stud, and after 1870 also at Dangu in Normandy. In 1873 he set a record as a racehorse owner by winning 110 races in a season.

== Career ==
He was a member of an ancient family seated at Chamant, near Senlis, L'Oise, and at the start of the 1850s entered on a brilliant career in business and in horse-breeding. At about this time a portrait was painted of him galloping on a horse, by Alfred de Dreux. He made a fortune in South America in the 1860s and on his return to France purchased a 600 hectare estate at Chamant, L'Oise, where he built the Haras du Chamant a famous model stud which became a reference for French horse-breeding. In 1870 he leased the Haras de Dangu stud in Normandy from the politician Comte Frédéric Lagrange (1815-1883), where he bred Flageolet, "twice the leading sire in France and the first French-bred and owned stallion to head the sires list in England".

In the early 1870s Lefèvre and Comte Frédéric Lagrange went into partnership for racing their horses in England, which lasted until 1878. The partnership's main trainer was Tom Jennings at Phantom House Stables, on the Fordham Road in Newmarket, who had worked in France for Lagrange. In the 1870s Jennings later established the "Lagrange Stables" on the Snailwell Road in Newmarket, named after his respected client. In England in 1872 Lefèvre built a house which he named Bellevue, on the Bury Road in Newmarket (headquarters of the British horseracing industry) in Suffolk, in "a picturesque Italian style" and in 1873 set a record as a racehorse owner by winning 110 races in a season. In 1883 he sold Bellevue to the Scottish aristocrat and millionaire William Stuart Stirling-Crawfurd (1819-1883), of Milton in Lanarkshire, Scotland, a prominent racehorse owner who in 1850 had been elected a member of the Jockey Club, the regulating body of British horseracing, whose wife was Caroline Agnes Horsley-Beresford (1818-1894), (Duchess of Montrose), a notable racehorse owner, a "wildly extravagant woman" who "strode across the racing scene". The Duchess re-named it "Sefton Lodge" after Stirling-Crawfurd's 1878 Derby winner "Sefton". It was a large house, with adjacent stables, backing onto the Bury Side training grounds, which in about 1883 was enlarged in the same style.

His racing colours were "tricolor" (bleu, blanc rouge / red white and blue) and he had great successes with his horses including Henry, Dutch Skater, Flageolet, Mortemer, Chancellor, Verdure and Moissonneur in races including the Prix Gladiateur, Prix de Diane, Prix Rainbow in France and in many of the greatest English races, including in 1872 the Oaks and 1000 Guineas with Reine and in 1883 the 1000 Guineas with Hauteur. In 1884 he made a partial dispersal of his stud, "selling youngsters, mares and horses in training for huge sums". In 1888 he sold all his yearlings to Baron Rothschild, and in 1892 sold his remaining livestock and his famed Haras du Chamant to Mr A. Ménier.

He was also a patron of the arts and many of the greatest artists of the age, including Harry Hall, Georges Arnull, Jean-Léon Gerome et Alfred de Dreux, visited him at Chamant to paint his portrait and those of his greatest horses.
