= Marcus Milner (cricketer) =

English racehorse trainer, soldier, civil servant and cricketer

Marcus Henry Milner, DSO, MVO (16 April 1864 – 16 January 1939) was an English racehorse trainer, soldier and civil servant and a cricketer who played two first-class cricket matches for Cambridge University in 1884. He was born at West Retford, Nottinghamshire and died at Liverpool.

== Career ==
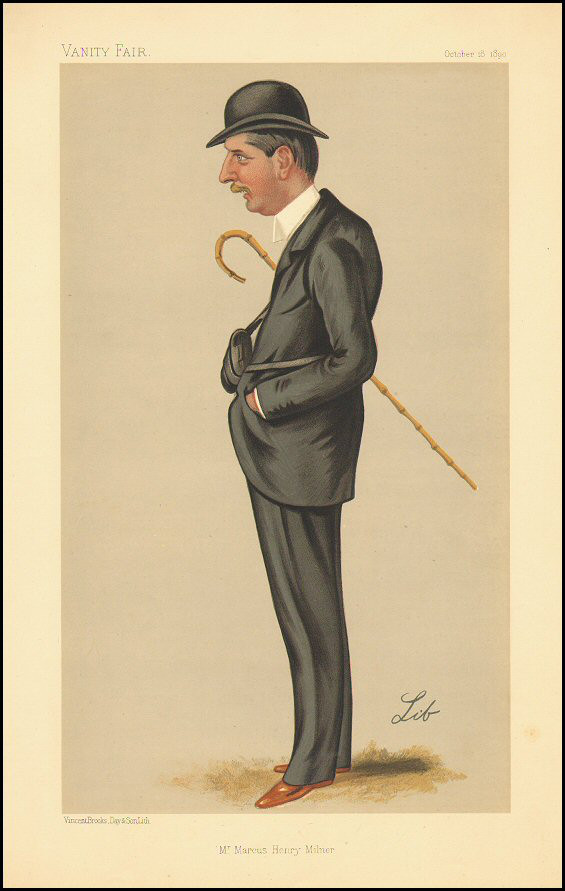
Caricature of Milner from an 1890 edition of Vanity Fair

Milner was educated at Wellington College and Trinity College, Cambridge. Having captained Wellington as a left-handed opening batsman and a left-arm medium-pace bowler, he played as a lower-order batsman and bowler in his two Cambridge matches; he took five wickets and scored 20 and 4 in the first game against an invitational amateur side, but was not successful in the second, and did not appear again.

Milner had a varied career after leaving Cambridge. In 1888, he married the Dowager Duchess of Montrose, a distant relation 46 years his senior (they were both descended from Marcus Beresford, 1st Earl of Tyrone). In 1874 after the death of her first husband the James Graham, 4th Duke of Montrose, she had married a wealthy racehorse owner, William Stuart Stirling-Crawfurd (1819–1883); she became an established breeder and trainer of racehorses, though forced by the conventions of the time to use a male pseudonym, "Mr Manton", for the business. For some time after her marriage to Milner the horses ran under his name, though the whole business had been sold in the months before the Duchess's death in 1894. According to his own short obituary in The Times, Milner acted as "controller" to successive generations of the Stanley family, the Earls of Derby.

Milner was also a decorated soldier, serving with the 16th Battalion of the Imperial Yeomanry in the Second Boer War in which he and many other officers were appointed Companion of the Distinguished Service Order (DSO) "in recognition of their services during the operations in South Africa". After his return from South Africa he was appointed a captain in the 2nd County of London Yeomanry on 18 October 1902, though as a regular yeomanry regiment this did not include active service. He volunteered for service as a major in the First World War, when he was aide-de-camp to the commanding officer of the 55th (West Lancashire) Division and was awarded the Belgian Croix de Guerre.

He also served briefly as a civil servant: he was appointed assistant private secretary (unpaid) to the Under-Secretary for War in September 1902, and private secretary from 1905 to 1906. He was appointed a Member of the Royal Victorian Order (MVO) in 1909.
