= Gang Forward =

British-bred Thoroughbred racehorse

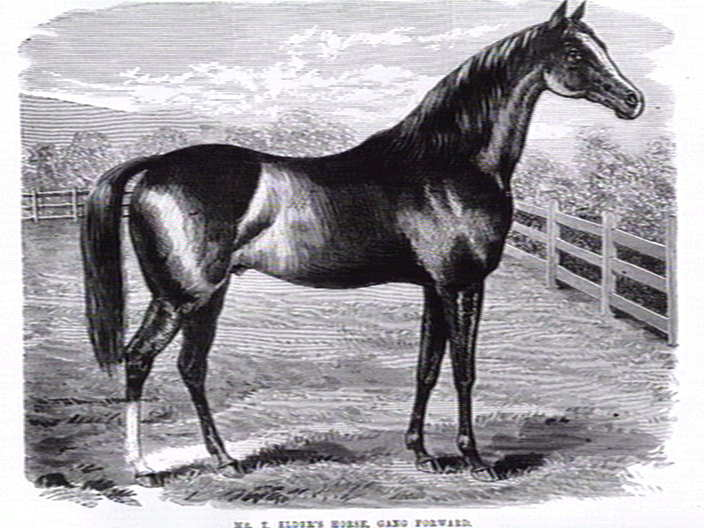
- Contemporary drawing of Gang Forward by an unknown artist.
- Sire: Stockwell
- Grandsire: The Baron
- Dam: Lady Mary
- Damsire: Orlando
- Sex: Stallion
- Foaled: 1870
- Country: United Kingdom
- Colour: Chestnut
- Owner: William Stuart Stirling-Crawfurd
- Trainer: Alec Taylor Sr.
- Record: ?:10-?-?
- Earnings: £7,591

Major wins
- Boscawen Stakes (1872); Glasgow Stakes (1872); 2000 Guineas (1873); St James's Palace Stakes (1873); Ascot Derby (1873); Jockey Club Cup (1874); Craven Stakes (1875)

Gang Forward (1870–1899) was a British Thoroughbred racehorse and sire. In a racing career which lasted from 1872 until 1874 he won ten races. He was one of the best colts of his generation in Britain, winning the 2000 Guineas in 1873. He later became a successful sire of winners in Australia.

== Background ==
Gang Forward, described as "a remarkably handsome, powerful colt" was bred by his owner William Stuart Stirling-Crawfurd (1819–1883), an "old school" sportsman who had married the widow of the 4th Duke of Montrose. Stirling-Crawfurd named the colt after the motto of Clan Stirling. Gang Forward was a chestnut horse standing 15.3 hands high with a white blaze and a white sock on his right hind leg. He was sired by Stockwell, winner of the 1852 St. Leger and 2,000 Guineas Stakes and a seven time leading sire. Gang Forward was trained at Manton in Wiltshire by Alec Taylor Sr., who had established his training facility there in 1870 under the patronage of Stirling-Crawfurd.

== Racing career ==
=== 1872: two-year-old season ===
Gang Forward began his racing career in September 1872, when he contested the Municipal Plate at Doncaster. He started a strong favourite at odds of 1/5 but was beaten into second place by an unnamed colt later named Fontabrian. It was subsequently revealed that he had been hampered by having twisted at least two of his racing plates during the race, although other sources attributed his defeat to his being "very backward". At the First October meeting at Newmarket he recorded his first victory when winning the Boscawen Stakes by a head from Surinam. Later at the same meeting he beat Paladin by a neck to win the Triennial Produce Stakes. At the end of October, Gang Forward ran twice at Newmarket's Houghton meeting and claimed two more prizes. He won the Glasgow Stakes from Andred and Surinam after a "fine race" and then was allowed to walk over for a first prize of £500 in a Sweepstakes when his opponents were withdrawn.

Gang Forward went into the winter break as one of the leading fancies for the following year's Classics alongside Kaiser and Flageolet.

=== 1873: three-year-old season ===
Gang Forward made his first appearance of 1873 in the 2000 Guineas at Newmarket on 30 April and started at odds of 8/1 against nine opponents, with Kaiser being made 15/8 favourite. The race attracted an extremely large crowd and there was a delay to the start as spectators were cleared from the course. Ridden by Tom Challoner, Gang Forward was among the front-runners from the start and two furlongs from the finish he was moved forward to dispute the lead with Kaiser. The two colts drew away from the rest of the field and after a "good race" Gang Forward prevailed by a head from the favourite, with Suleiman three lengths back in third place. Immediately after his win, Gang Forward was made clear favourite for the Derby at odds of 9/4.

At Epsom on 28 May Gang Forward started 9/4 favourite for the Derby in a field of twelve runners. He was among the early leaders but then dropped back before running on in the straight. He was never able to reach the lead however and dead-heated with Kaiser for second place, half a length behind the 40/1 winner Doncaster, who had finished unplaced in the "Guineas". Gang Forward and Kaiser met again in the Prince of Wales's Stakes at Royal Ascot in June and had another close contest. On this occasion, Gang Forward looked the likely winner before swerving to the right in the closing strides and losing by a short-head to Kaiser in a race which was effectively a match between the two favourites in the straight. At the same meeting he won both the St James's Palace Stakes and the Ascot Derby.

Gang Forward was strongly fancied the St Leger after performing impressively in training with Challoner claiming that the horse was better than ever. He was to be transported to Doncaster by train, but only reached Oxford, where he was removed from his carriage and found to be lame as a result of a hock injury. He was immediately withdrawn from the Doncaster Classic, in which the filly Marie Stuart defeated Doncaster and Kaiser.

Gang Forward's earnings for the 1873 season totalled £5,000.

=== 1874 & 1875: four- and five- year-old seasons ===
Gang Forward was less successful as a four-year-old when he was campaigned in staying races. At Royal Ascot, Gang Forward turned into the straight in second place in the Ascot Gold Cup but faded in the closing stages and finished unplaced behind the French colt Boiard. His only important success of the year came in the Jockey Club Cup. In the following year he recorded his last major victory in the Craven Stakes.

== Stud career ==
In 1875 Gang Forward was sold for 4000 guineas to Sir Thomas Elder and exported to South Australia. The best of his progeny included Hortense (Ascot Vale Stakes), Chetwynd (Goodwood Handicap), Guesswork (South Australian Derby) and Remus (VRC Mares' Produce Stakes). He was euthanised due to old age in May 1899.

== Pedigree ==
Pedigree of Gang Forward (GB), chestnut stallion, 1870
Sire Stockwell (GB) 1849	The Baron; 1842	Birdcatcher	Sir Hercules
Sire Stockwell (GB) 1849	The Baron; 1842	Birdcatcher	Guiccioli
Sire Stockwell (GB) 1849	The Baron; 1842	Echidna	Economist
Sire Stockwell (GB) 1849	The Baron; 1842	Echidna	Miss Pratt
Sire Stockwell (GB) 1849	Pocahontas; 1837	Glencoe	Sultan
Sire Stockwell (GB) 1849	Pocahontas; 1837	Glencoe	Trampoline
Sire Stockwell (GB) 1849	Pocahontas; 1837	Marpessa	Muley
Sire Stockwell (GB) 1849	Pocahontas; 1837	Marpessa	Clare
Dam Lady Mary (GB) 1854	Orlando; 1841	Touchstone	Camel
Dam Lady Mary (GB) 1854	Orlando; 1841	Touchstone	Banter
Dam Lady Mary (GB) 1854	Orlando; 1841	Vulture	Langar
Dam Lady Mary (GB) 1854	Orlando; 1841	Vulture	Kite
Dam Lady Mary (GB) 1854	Splitvote; 1841	St Luke	Bedlamite
Dam Lady Mary (GB) 1854	Splitvote; 1841	St Luke	Eliza Leeds
Dam Lady Mary (GB) 1854	Splitvote; 1841	Electress	Election
Dam Lady Mary (GB) 1854	Splitvote; 1841	Electress	Stamford mare (Family:2-u)
