= Atherstone rail accident =

1860 railway incident in England

Details
- Date: 16 November 1860; 02:05
- Location: Atherstone railway station
- Coordinates: 52.574°N 1.547°W
- Country: England
- Line: Trent Valley Line
- Cause: Signal passed at danger

Statistics
- Trains: 2
- Deaths: 10
- Injured: 13

The Atherstone rail accident happened near Atherstone railway station in the small hours of the morning of 16 November 1860, and killed 10 people.

A special cattle train from Holyhead to London via Peterborough was shunting just south of Atherstone station to let the Scotch mail train pass. Before the cattle train could clear the main line, the mail train struck it. The four rear carriages of the cattle train were 'shivered to pieces' killing all nine Irish drovers who were asleep in the brake van and the fireman of the mail train, James Sherry. 29 cattle were killed or had to be slaughtered soon afterwards. The Duke and Duchess of Montrose were passengers on the mail train but escaped without injury.

The driver of the mail train was not aware that a cattle train was ahead of him when they left Tamworth (the preceding station) and claimed he had not seen the advance signal at all approaching Atherstone station, but did not worry as he was not aware of there being a train ahead of him. By the time he saw a red signal just before the station he immediately applied the brakes but it was too late to avoid the collision.

The enquiry criticized the decision to allow the cattle train to leave Tamworth ahead of the mail train without allowing sufficient time to clear the lines at Atherstone, and of the failure to warn the mail train driver about the train ahead of him. It also criticized the driver for not seeing the advance red signal. A further recommendation was that in future in cattle trains drovers' vans be placed in front of the cattle trucks instead of behind them.

== Sources ==
- Watts, Brenda; Winyard, Eleanor (1988). The History of Atherstone. pp. 96–97. ISBN 0-948087-12-9.
- "Frightful Accident on the Trent Valley Railway". The Times. 17 November 1860. p. 7.
- "The Trent Valley Railway Collision". The Times. 26 November 1860. p. 7.
