= Reve d'Or =

British-bred Thoroughbred racehorse

- Sire: Hampton
- Grandsire: Lord Clifden
- Dam: Queen of Roses
- Damsire: Sundeelah
- Sex: Mare
- Foaled: 1884
- Country: United Kingdom
- Colour: Chestnut
- Breeder: Henry Somerset, 8th Duke of Beaufort
- Owner: Henry Somerset, 8th Duke of Beaufort
- Trainer: Alec Taylor Sr.
- Record: 39: 14-4-2

Major wins
- Dewhurst Plate (1886); 1000 Guineas (1887); Oaks Stakes (1887); Sussex Stakes (1887); York Queen's Plate (1887); Yorkshire Oaks (1887); Great Foal Stakes (1887); Newmarket Oaks (1887); Jockey Club Cup (1888); City and Suburban Handicap (1890)

Reve d'Or (1884 – after 1904) was a British Thoroughbred racehorse and broodmare who won two British Classic Races in 1887. She ran nine times as a juvenile in 1886, winning three races including an upset victory in the Dewhurst Plate in October. In the following year she won nine races including the 1000 Guineas, Oaks Stakes, Sussex Stakes, York Queen's Plate, Yorkshire Oaks, Great Foal Stakes and Newmarket Oaks. She remained in training until the age of seven, winning the Jockey Club Cup in 1888 and the City and Suburban Handicap in 1890. She had limited success as a broodmare in France.

== Background ==
Reve d'Or was a chestnut mare bred and owned by Henry Somerset, 8th Duke of Beaufort. The filly was sent into training with Alec Taylor Sr. at Manton in Wiltshire.

Her sire, Hampton was an excellent stayer who won both the Goodwood Cup and the Doncaster Cup. Hampton was Champion sire in 1887 and sired, in addition to Merry Hampton, the Derby winners Merry Hampton, Ladas and Ayrshire as well as the influential sires Bay Ronald and Royal Hampton. Reve d'Or's dam, Queen of the Roses, was a granddaughter of the Irish broodmare Maria (foaled 1845), making her a distant relative of The Finn and Wintergreen. Queen of the Roses had once been sold for £30 and was then acquired almost as cheaply by the Duke of Beaufort.

== Racing career ==
=== 1886: two-year-old season ===
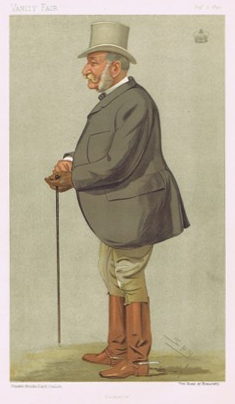
Reve d'Or's owner, the 8th Duke of Beaufort

In her first major test, Reve d'Or finished third to Timothy in the Stockbrige Post Sweepstakes at Stockbridge Racecourse in June and then contested a Rous Memorial Stakes over six furlongs at Goodwood Racecourse on 29 July in which ran unplaced behind Mamia. She then won the Bretty Stakes at Derby Racecourse, upsetting the 1/20 favourite Kilwarlin.

On 1 October at Newmarket Racecourse the filly started 7/2 favourite for another Rous Memorial but was unplaced again. At the end of the month at Newmarket she ran third to Caller Herrin in the Criterion Stakes. and then won the Home-bred Produce Stakes. Reve d'Or was then stepped up in class for the seven furlong Dewhurst Plate at the same meeting and started a 20/1 outsider in a ten-runner field which included Florentine (winner of the Middle Park Plate), Enterprise (July Stakes) and Freedom (Molecomb Stakes). Ridden by Charles Wood she tracked the leaders before going to the front approaching the final furlong and drew away in the closing stages to win by three lengths from Enterprise.

Reve d'Or was beaten in three other races in 1886.

=== 1887: three-year-old season ===
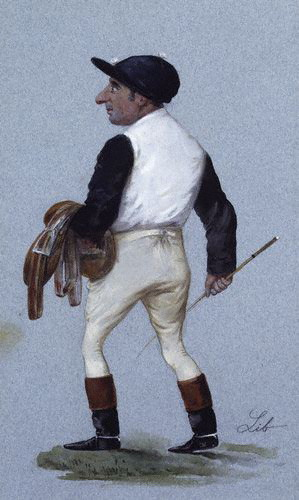
Charles Wood, who rode Reve d'Or to victory in two classic races

On 29 April Reve d'Or, with Wood in the saddle, started the even money favourite for the 74th running of the 1000 Guineas over the Rowley Mile at Newmarket. The best fancied of her eleven rival were Agave, Lord Zetland's Gale, Edoardo Ginistrelli's Ginestra and Lord Bradford's Tactic. Reve d'Or was settled just behind the leaders as first St Mary, then Agnostic, then Porcelain made the running. She took the lead entering the last quarter mile and after a "good race" won by half a length from Porcelain, with Freedom the same distance away in third place.

Reve d'Or was then stepped up in distance for the 109th running of the Oaks Stakes over one and a half miles at Epsom Racecourse. She started the 8/11 favourite ahead of Lady Muncaster, with Freedom and Hawthorn being the only others in the nine-runner field to start at less than 25/1. Reve d'Or was settled by Wood in mid-division before making steady progress and turned into the straight in second place behind the 40/1 outsider St Helen. The favourite overtook the outsider inside the last quarter mile and drew away to win "in a canter" by three lengths with a long gap back to Freedom in third. Shortly afterwards she ran in a five furlong sprint race at Sandown Park Racecourse leading to claims that she was being "egregiously messed about" by her connections.

At Royal Ascot on 7 June Reve d'Or was matched against male opposition in the Prince of Wales's Stakes, which was then run over thirteen furlongs and restricted to three-year-olds. She finished second to the colt Claymore in race which was ruined as a contest when a frightened police horse swerved across the track, hampering several of the runners. The Gold Cup two days later was another unsatisfactory race: the pacemaker Bird of Freedom was allowed to open up a huge lead and was never seriously challenged, winning by three lengths with Reve d'Or finishing at the rear of the six-runner field.

Reve d'Or ran twice at Goodwood, winning the Sussex Stakes on 27 July at odds of 4/9 from the colts Scottish King and Devilshoof, but being beaten by the outsider Maize in the Nassau Stakes. In August at York Racecourse in August Reve d'Or defeated Maize "in a canter" to win the Yorkshire Oaks at odds of 1/4. At the same meeting she was matched against the five-year-old mare Merry Duchess (winner of the City and Suburban Handicap) in the Queen's Plate over two miles. Exiting the paddock she reared up, throwing Wood from the saddle and breaking her bridle, thereby causing a considerable delay. When the race eventually began she quickly opened up a clear lead and won "easily" by a length. At Doncaster Racecourse in September she was beaten by a head by Porcelain in the Park Hill Stakes. At the end of the month she returned to winning form by taking the Great Foal Stakes at Newmarket, and went on to win the Newmarket Oaks in October. In the Cambridgeshire Handicap she again threw off her jockey on the way to the start before finishing tenth behind Gloriation.

Reve d'Or won at least two other races in 1887 to end the year with winnings of £10,559.

=== 1888–1891: later career ===
At Manchester Racecourse on 25 May 1988 Reve d'Or finished unplaced under top weight of 120 pounds in the fourteen furlong Manchester Cup. She started 2/1 favourite in her second attempt to win the Ascot Gold Cup on 14 June but came home at the rear of the five-runner field behind Timothy. On 9 October at Newmarket she finished unplaced under 121 pounds in the Cesarewitch. Two weeks later she ran unplaced in the Cambridgeshire but in the Jockey Club Cup at the same meeting she won the Jockey Club Cup at odds of 1/2, beating her only rival Cotillon by half a length.

In 1889, Reve d'Or began her fourth season by again finishing unplaced in the Manchester Cup, run that year on 14 June. In November she finished second to Philomel in the Autumn Cup at Liverpool.

On 23 April 1890, Reve d'Or, by now a six-year-old, was assigned a weight of 111 pounds in the City and Suburban Handicap at Epsom. Ridden by Mornington Cannon she hampered several of her opponents when veering to the right in the closing stages but prevailed by a neck from French-bred Vasistas. The racecourse stewards held an enquiry but allowed the result to stand. In May she was unplaced for a third time in the Manchester Cup, with the race being won by L'Abbesse de Jouarre. Later that year she ran unplaced in the Ascot Gold Vase, Royal Hunt Cup, Goodwood Cup and Liverpool Autumn Cup.

Despite reports that she was to be retired at the end of 1890 Reve d'Or returned in April 1891 and finished fourth in the City and Suburban Handicap. before running unplaced at Sandown a day later. At Goodwood on 31 July she was unplaced in the Chesterfield Cup.

== Breeding record ==
At the end of her racing career, Reve d'Or was retired to become a broodmare and was deported to France. She produced at least seven foals:

- Reve d'Amour, a brown mare, foaled in 1894, sired by Petronel
- Regate, chestnut mare, 1898, by Xantrailles. Dam of the Prix du Gros Chêne winner Racine.
- Fayence, chestnut mare, 1899, by Chesterfield
- Larue, chestnut mare, 1900, by Clamart
- Oussouri, chestnut mare, 1902, by Chesterfield. Dam of the Grand Prix de Paris runner-up Opott.
- Conchita, bay mare, 1903, by Perth
- Boreale, bay mare, 1904, by Bocage

== Pedigree ==
Pedigree of Reve d'Or (GB), chestnut mare, 1884
Sire Hampton (GB) 1872	Lord Clifden; 1860	Newminster	Touchstone
Sire Hampton (GB) 1872	Lord Clifden; 1860	Newminster	Beeswing
Sire Hampton (GB) 1872	Lord Clifden; 1860	The Slave	Melbourne
Sire Hampton (GB) 1872	Lord Clifden; 1860	The Slave	Volley
Sire Hampton (GB) 1872	Lady Langden; 1868	Kettledrum	Rataplan
Sire Hampton (GB) 1872	Lady Langden; 1868	Kettledrum	Hybla
Sire Hampton (GB) 1872	Lady Langden; 1868	Haricot	Lanercost
Sire Hampton (GB) 1872	Lady Langden; 1868	Haricot	Queen Mary
Dam Queen of the Roses (GB) 1869	Sundeelah; 1861	Jeremy Diddler	Jerry
Dam Queen of the Roses (GB) 1869	Sundeelah; 1861	Jeremy Diddler	Marpessa
Dam Queen of the Roses (GB) 1869	Sundeelah; 1861	Madeleleine	The Libel
Dam Queen of the Roses (GB) 1869	Sundeelah; 1861	Madeleleine	Rebreast
Dam Queen of the Roses (GB) 1869	Feronia; 1902	West Australian	Melbourne
Dam Queen of the Roses (GB) 1869	Feronia; 1902	West Australian	Mowerina
Dam Queen of the Roses (GB) 1869	Feronia; 1902	Maria	Harkaway
Dam Queen of the Roses (GB) 1869	Feronia; 1902	Maria	Suspicion (Family 4)
