= City and Suburban Handicap =

Flat horse race in Surrey, United Kingdom

- Class: Class 2
- Location: Epsom Downs; Epsom, England
- Inaugurated: 1851; 175 years ago
- Race type: Flat / Thoroughbred
- Sponsor: Lilley Plummer Risks
- Website: Epsom

Race information
- Distance: 1 mile 2 furlongs 17 yards (2,027 m)
- Surface: Turf
- Track: Left-handed
- Qualification: Four-years-old and up
- Weight: Handicap
- Purse: £50,000 (2024); 1st: £25,770

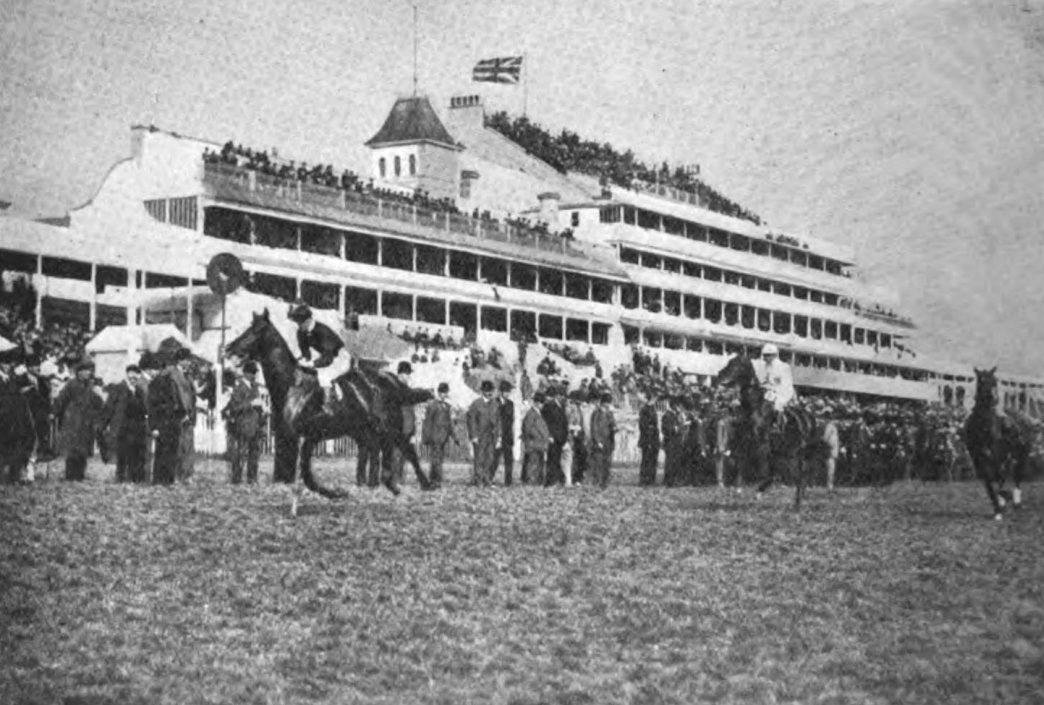
The finish of the 1915 running won by Black Jester

City And Suburban Handicap
2026
Rathgar	Sallaal	Asmen Warrior

Previous years
2025
City Of Delight	Rathgar	Stressfree
2024
Crystal Delight	Ziggy	Silent Film
2023
Bad Company	Caius Chorister	Soto Sizzler
2022
Soto Sizzler	Achelois	Love Is Golden
2021
Victory Chime	Sky Defender	Alfred Boucher

2020-2011
2019
Mountain Angel	Aquarium	Aasheq
2018
Ajman King	Dash Of Spice	Another Touch
2017
Brorocco	Banditry	Gawdawpalin
2016
Dark Red	Pacify	What About Carlo
2015
Collaboration	Hold The Line	Fire Fighting
2014
Sennockian Star	Clayton	Soviet Rock
2013
Area Fifty One	Clayton	Vasily
2012
Right Step	Sirvino	Tres Coronas
2011
Spanish Duke	Resurge	Ramona Chase

2010-2003
2010
Alainmaar	Hanoverian Baron	Tartan Gunna
2009
Duncan	Lake Poet	Dona Alba
2008
Cabinet	Eradicate	Heaven Knows
2007
Blue Bajan	Charlie Tokyo	Benandonner
2006
All That And More	Impeller	Divine Gift
2005
King's Thought	Shahzan House	Counsel's Opinion
2004
Blythe Knight	Bonecrusher	Shahzan House
2003
Lingo	Danelor	The Glen

The City and Suburban Handicap is a flat handicap horse race in Great Britain open to horses aged four years or older. It is run over a distance of 1 mile 2 furlongs and 17 yards (2,027 metres) at Epsom in April during the Epsom Spring meeting. Inaugurated in 1851 it originally attracted top-class racehorses in the 19th and early 20th century; today its importance has been eclipsed by larger stakes races with more valuable purses.

== History ==
The City and Suburban Handicap and its companion race, the Great Metropolitan Handicap, were devised by London hosteler Samuel Powell Beeton who owned The Dolphin in Cheapside. The establishment was well known for gambling and was dubbed "the Tattersalls of the east end" by the racing public. In 1846 Beeton and a collection of other tavern owners (known collectively as the "Licensed Victuallers of London") raised £300 to establish a purse for the first running of the Great Metropolitan Handicap. The race was popular with the city betting houses and by 1851 Beeton had raised additional money by drafting subscriptions from both city and suburban gambling houses to establish a second race on Epsom Downs, the City and Suburban.

The inaugural race was run on 4 April 1851 where it was open to three-year-old and older horses of either sex that had won a stakes race worth at least 200 sovereigns in their career. The winner was required to pay £10 out of the purse to the Licensed Victuallers' Protection Society, a fund and charity for retired British pub owners. The first running was held on the New Derby course at a mile and a quarter and was close match between Lord Eglinton's 5-year-old horse Elthiron sired by Pantaloon and Mr. Carew's mare Eva, Elthiron winning by a head in two minutes and 25 seconds. Hostelers contributed to the winnings purse until 1853 when the Betting Houses Act outlawed gambling in taverns and public houses.

The Handicap attracted some top-class racehorses in the late 19th and first half of the 20th century. Several British Classic race winners such as Virago, (1,000 Guineas), Reve d'Or (Oaks), Sefton (Derby), Bend Or (Derby), Robert the Devil (St. Leger) and Black Jester (St. Leger) won the race. The American-bred gelding Parole also won the City and Suburban and the Great Metropolitan Handicaps on consecutive days in 1879. The caliber of entries has declined in recent years and the City and Suburban is currently not a graded stakes race.

In 1916 during World War I, turf activities at Epsom were curtailed and many of the spring races were run elsewhere. The equivalent of the City and Suburban, dubbed the "Suburban" Handicap was run at Lingfield Park in June and was won by Lord Carnarvon's colt Julian. The race was not held in 1917 and 1918 due to the war and was canceled in 1921 due to concerns over petrol and coal availability. At the onset of World War II, the racing meetings at Epsom Downs were suspended in 1940 and did not resume until the summer of 1946. The City and Suburban was reinstated at Epsom on 5 August 1946 to allow time for the course to be refurbished after the long hiatus.

== Winners ==
The race has been won by several mares including the Oaks winner Reve d'Or. The first mare to win the City and Suburban was Butterfly in 1852 and the last was Starlet in 1990. The race was open to three-year-old horses in its early years, with the last three-year-old winner under the race's formal title being Mushroom (1911) and the last under provisional title, the "Suburban" Handicap, being Julian (1916).

=== Records ===
Leading jockey (6 wins):

- Morny Cannon: Reve d'Or (1890), Nunthorpe (1891), Reminder (1895), Worcester (1896), Newhaven II (1899), The Grafter (1900)
- 5 wins: Fred Archer: Thunder (1876), Julius Caesar (1878), Parole (1879), Master Kildare (1880), Bend Or (1881)

=== 1851–1911 ===
Year	Winner	Age	Jockey	Owner	Time	Ref
1851	Elthiron	5	Marlow	Lord Eglinton	2:25.00
1852	Butterfly	3	Kendall	Mr. Henry	2:16.00
1853	Ethelbert	3	Wells	Mr. Oliver	2:20.00 (dh)
1854	Virago	3	Wells	Mr. Howard	2:15.00
1855	Ireland's Eye	5	Wells	H. Hill
1856	Hospitality	3	Bullock	Mr. Ridley
1857	Adamas	3	Fordham	Mr. Mellish
1858	Madame de Chantilly	4	Spreoty	Count Lagrange
1859	Glenbuck	3	J. Adams	Captain Grey
1860	Comforter	4	Henry Custance	Sir H. des Vceux
1861	Cantine	5	L. Snowden	Lord Ailesbury
1862	Sawcutter	4	Tom Chaloner	Mr. R. C. Naylor
1863	Adventurer	4	Noble	Mr. J. Gilby
1864	Merry Hart	4	Morgan	Lord Westmoreland
1865	Argonaut	6	Wells	Joseph Hawley
1866	Delight	3	Kenyon	C.H. Carew
1867	Abergeldie	4	Huxtable	Mr. F. Swindell
1868	Speculum	3	Cameron	Duke of Newcastle
1869	Alpenstock	3	Jeffrey	Mr. Bevill
1870	Sabinus	3	Rowell	William Graham
1871	Jack Spigot	3	Crickmere	J. Parry
1872	Digby Grand	4	F. Webb	Mr. Keswick
1873	Mornington	5	Mordan	Mr. Brayley	2:14.00
1874	Aldrich	3	Morbey	Lord Rosebery
1875	Dalham	4	Mills	Mr. T. Smith
1876	Thunder	6	Fred Archer	Mr. H.F.C. Vyner
1877	Julius Caesar	4	Fred Archer	Mr. T. Gee
1878	Sefton	3	Gallon	Mr. W. S. Crawford
1879	Parole	6	Fred Archer	Pierre Lorillard
1880	Master Kildare	5	Fred Archer	Lord Hastings
1881	Bend Or	4	Fred Archer	1st Duke of Westminster	2:07.00
1882	Passaic	4	Weston	Lord Rossmore
1883	Roysterer	5	Gallon	Lord Rosebery
1884	Quicklime	5	Tomlinson	Lord Bradford
1885	Bird of Freedom	3	F. Barrett	Mr. Tidy
1886	Royal Hampton	4	Charles Wood	Mr. Childwick
1887	Merry Duchess	5	Sam Loates	T.L. Wardle	2:11.20
1888	Fullerton	5	J. Woodburn	Sir G. Chetwynd
1889	Goldseeker	4	Tom Cannon, Jr.	Mr. Leybourne
1890	Reve d'Or	6	Morny Cannon	Duke of Beaufort
1891	Nunthorpe	5	Morny Cannon	Colonel North	2:20.00
1892	Buccaneer	4	George Barrett	Lord Rosslyn
1893	King Charles	4	Gough	Mr. Taylor King
1894	Grey Leg	3	Bradford	Duke of Westmoreland	2:13.20
1895	Reminder	4	Morny Cannon	Tom Cannon, Sr.
1896	Worcester	6	Morny Cannon	Barney Barnato
1897	Balsamo	4	Otto Madden	Duke of Devonshire
1898	Bay Ronald	5	W. Bradford	Mr. L. Brassey	2:09.20
1899	Newhaven II	6	Morny Cannon	Mr. W. Cooper	2:18.00
1900	The Grafter	7	Morny Cannon	Mr. J. Clarke	2:11.60
1901	Australian Star	5	William Halsey	Mr. S. Gollan	2:10.80
1902	First Principal	5	Walter Bray	Mr. Stedall	2:07.60
1903	Brambilla	3	George Thompson	M Ephrussi
1904	Robert le Diable	5	William Lane	Lord Carnarvon	2:08.60
1905	Pharisee	6	Danny Maher	Sir J. Miller	2:07.00
1906	Dean Swift	5	Herbert Randell	J.B. Joel	2:06.20
1907	Velocity	5	Herbert Jones	Mrs. H.V. Jackson	2:09.20
1908	Dean Swift	7	Herbert Randall	J.B. Joel	2:11.60
1909	White Eagle	4	William Saxby	Mr. W. Hall Walker	2:07.20
1910	Bachelor's Double	4	Charlie Trigg	J. Lowry	2:09.60
1911	Mushroom	3	William Huxley	Mr. T. Barling	2:05.60

=== 1912–1987 ===
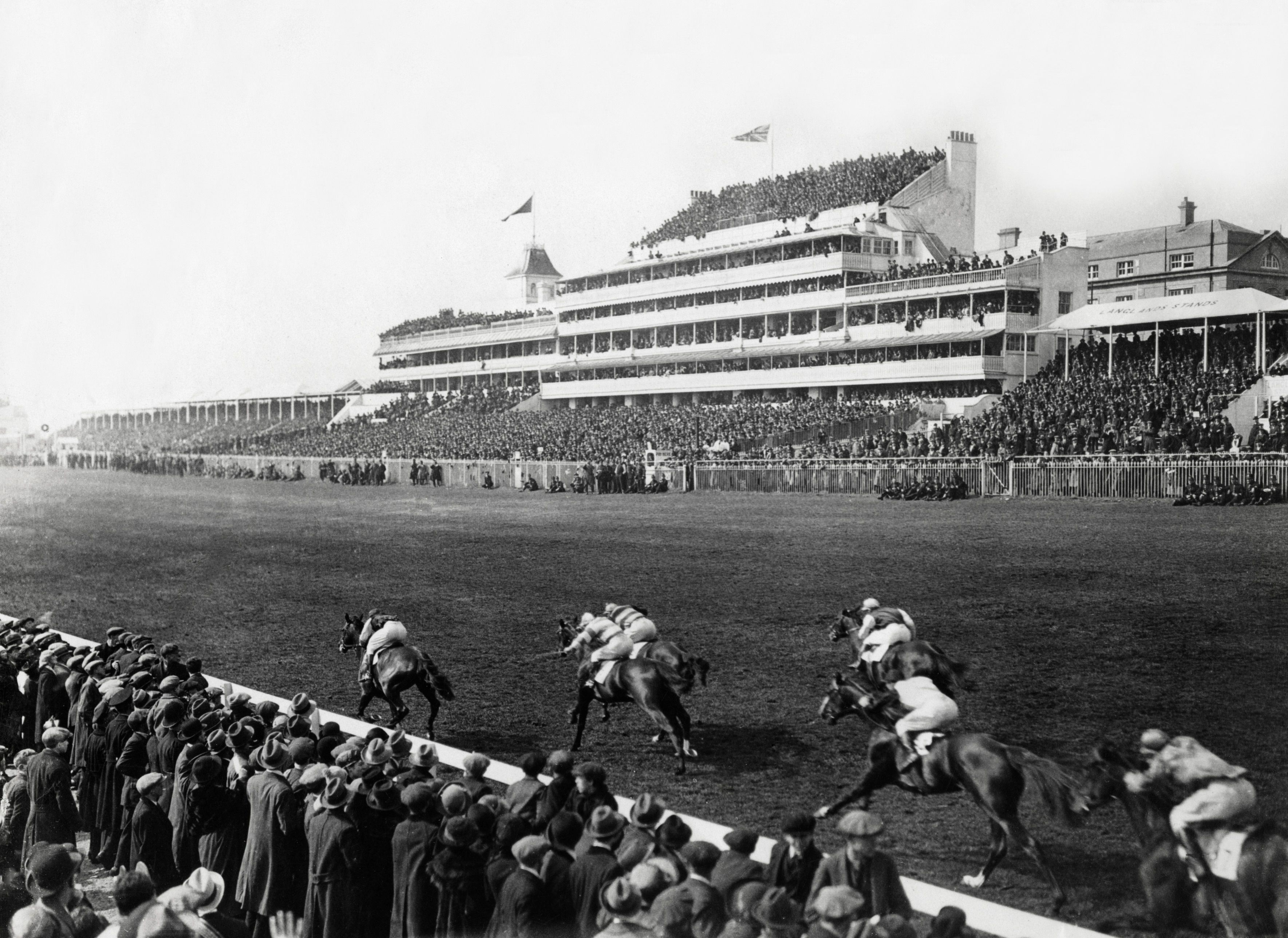
1922 race won by Paragon

Year	Winner	Age	Jockey	Trainer	Owner	Time	Ref
1912	Chili II	4	William Huxley	Patrick Hartigan	Mr. R. Mills	2:06.80
1913	Drinmore	5	Fred Cheshire	Patrick Hartigan	Mr. G. Edwarde	2:09.20
1914	Maiden Erlegh	5	Walter Griggs	Charles Peck	Mr. Sol Joel	2:05.00
1915	Black Jester	4	William Huxley	Charles Morton	Jack Joel	2:06.80
1916 (Note: The 1916 race was run at Lingfield Park in June as the "Suburban" Handicap due to curtailment of turf events during World War I.)	Julian	3	Vic Smyth	Richard Dawson	Lord Carnarvon	2:07.40
1917	no race
1918	no race
1919	Royal Banks	6	Steve Donoghue	Robert Sievier	Lady Queensbury	2:16.40
1920	Corn Sack	4	Arthur Balding	Peter Gilpin	Sir Ernest Paget	2:19.20
1921	Abandoned due to a National Coal Strike
1922	Paragon	5	George Archibald Sr.	Peter Gilpin	Sir Ernest Paget	2:06.80
1923	Dry Toast	4	Jack Townsend	Ernest Piggott	B.B. Davidson	2:10.40
1924	Ulula	7	William McLachlan Jr.	Bartholomew, Jr.	Lady Torrington	2:17.40
1925	Greek Bachelor	5	Jack Sirett	Stanley Wootton	Stanley Wootton	2:05.60
1926	Warden of the Marches	4	Steve Donoghue	Fred Darling	Lord Lyonsdale	2:11.20
1927	Embargo	5	Steve Donoghue	F. Scott	Maharaja of Rajpipla	2:05.00
1928	Priory Park	6	Brownie Carslake	Charles Peck	Jack Joel	2:09.00
1929	Parwiz	4	Michael Beary	Richard Dawson	The Aga Khan	2:05.60
1930	Lucky Tor	5	Gordon Richards	Joseph Lawson	W.M.G. Singer	2:05.40
1931	Anthurium	4	Robert Lynch	Willie Pratt	James A. de Rothschild	2:10.40
1932	Clogheen	4	Cliff Richards	Gilbert	Mrs. C. Jones	2:15.00
1933	Great Scot	7	James Collins	H G Fergusson	Chester Beatty	2:05.00
1934	Light Sussex	4	Harry Wragg	Charles Elsey	Major C. Behrens	2:10.60
1935	Montrose	5	Gordon Richards	Fred Darling	Lord Woolavington	2:06.60
1936	His Reverence	5	Tommy Burns Sr.	Gerald Wellesley	G.F. Annesley and J. Wellesley	2:10.60
1937	William of Valence	5	Herbert Packham	Herbert Smyth	Mr. A Sainsbury	2:14.00
1938	Pigskin	6	Cliff Richards	Joseph Lawson	Mrs. Chester Beatty	2:05.80
1939	Bistolfi	4	Harry Wragg	Ossie Bell	Mrs. Lionel Corbett	2:06.40
1940–1945	no race
1946 (Note: The 1946 City and Suburban was held on 5 August at Epsom Downs to allow the racecourse to be refurbished.)	Hobo	4	Eph Smith	Jack Jarvis	Lord Rosebery	2:04.20
1947	Banco	4	Tommy Burn	William Smyth	Duchess of Norfolk	2:17.00
1948	Fast Soap	5	Eph Smith	Gordon Johnson-Houghton	A.A. Jarvis	2:08.20
1949	Impeccable	5	Gordon Richards	J.B. Powell	Mr. R. McIlhagga	2:07.20
1950	Iron Duke	4	Edgar Britt	Marcus Marsh	Mr. Gibson	2:11.00
1951	Burnt Brown	5	Bill Evans	Norman Scobie	Mrs. S. Jacobson	2:07.60
1952	Sunny Brae	4	Ted Fordyce	Donald Watson	Mrs. J.A. de Rothschild	2:09.60
1953	Damremont	6	Jimmy Lindley	Tom Rimell	T.H. Degg	2:09.80
1954	Sunny Brae	6	Bill Elliott	Donald Watson	Mrs. J.A. de Rothschild	2:08.20
1955	Coronation Year	4	Doug Smith	Arthur Thomas	A.J. Thomas	2:07.20
1956	Great Pacha	6	Doug Smith	J Rogers	The Maharani of Baroda	2:08.20
1957	Coronation Year	6	Doug Smith	Arthur Thomas	A.J. Thomas	2:08.00
1958	Setting Star	6	Stan Clayton	Dick Hern	Major L.B. Holliday	2:10.00
1959	Guersillus	4	Eddie Hide	Charles Elsey	Phil Bull	2:12.00
1960	Firestreak	4	Lester Piggott	Peter Nelson	Mr. John Lewis	2:07.40
1961	Nerograph	5	Tommy Carter	George Todd	T.F.C. Frost	2:08.00
1962	Eastern Nip	4	Bruce Raymond	Willie Stephenson	Major L. Gardener	2:10.00
1963	Tahiri	4	Stan Clayton	Towser Gosden	Sir Harold Wernher	2:10.20
1964	The Bo'Sun	4	Stan Smith	Jack Jarvis	Lord Rosebery	2:21.04
1965	Minor Portion	4	Jimmy Lindley	Jeremy Tree	Sir P. Dunn	2:12.31
1966	Abandoned due to waterlogging
1967	Hotroy	6	Duncan Keith	Walter Nightingall	Mr A. Kennedy	2:10.96
1968	My Swanee	5	Lester Piggott	Bill Marshall	Mrs L. Napier	2:11.16
1969	Karabas	4	Lester Piggott	Bernard van Cutsem	Lord Iveagh	2:12.71
1970	Granados	4	Frankie Durr	Geoffrey Barling	Mr. E. Benjamin	2:13.50
1971	Tandy	5	Lester Piggott	Brian Swift	Mr B. Shine	2:07.02
1972	Owen Anthony	8	Terry McKeown	Doug Smith	Mr A. Samuel	2:12.14
1973	Buss	4	Geoff Lewis	Arthur Budgett	Mr L. van Moppes	2:11.16
1974	Belper	5	Willie Carson	John Dunlop	Lady Manton	2:07.49
1975	Swell Fellow	4	Tony Kimberley	Jeremy Hindley	Lord J. Crichton-Stuart	2:16.69
1976	Red Regent	4	Pat Eddery	Peter Walwyn	Sir D. Clague	2:08.99
1977	Turnpike	4	John Matthias	Ian Balding	Mrs. J. MacDougald	2:12.26
1978	Saros	4	Pat Eddery	Peter Walwyn	Carlo Vittadini	2:20.51
1979	Doogali	5	Walter Swinburn	W H Williams	Lord Strathalmond	2:14.92
1980	Sea Chimes	4	Willie Carson	John Dunlop	John Thursby	2:07.71
1981	Lafontaine	4	Greville Starkey	Clive Brittain	Mrs. J Bigg	2:10.29
1982	African Pearl	4	Bryn Crossley	Ron Simpson	J. McCaughay	2:07.89
1983	Cannon King	7	Willie Carson	John Dunlop	Eric Pensar	2:23.70
1984	My Tony	4	Taffy Thomas	Geoff Lewis	E. Holding	2:09.08
1985	Redden	7	Chris Rutter	M J Bolton	A. Bateson	2:12.09
1986	Nebris	5	Pat Eddery	Reg Akehurst		2:19.47
1987	Ben Adhem	5	Chris Rutter	Henry Candy	Gerald Kidd	2:08.43

=== 1988–present ===
Year	Winner	Age	Jockey	Trainer	Owner	Time
1988	Ben Adhem	6	Chris Rutter	Henry Candy	Gerald Kidd	2:14.73
1989	Dismiss	4	Michael Hills	Ron Smyth	Lord McAlpine	2:16.72
1990	Starlet	4	Dale Gibson	Lord Huntingdon	Queen Elizabeth II	2:08.13
1991 (Note: The 1991 race was run at Kempton Park.)	No Submission	5	Darryll Holland	Charlie Nelson	P F Warren	2:06.03
1992–1996	No race
1997	Major Change	5	Kieren Fallon	Miss Gay Kelleway	The Two In One Partnership	2:07.34
1998	Kewarra	4	Tim Sprake	Rod Millman	G Palmer	2:16.32
1999	Chief Cashier	4	Alan Daly	Toby Balding	Surgical Spirits	2:13.38
2000	Night Venture	4	Richard Hills	Barry Hills	Maktoum Al Maktoum	2:19.81
2001	Roman King	6	Keith Dalgleish	Mark Johnston	D J & F A Jackson	2:20.49
2002	Kirovski	5	Eddie Ahern	Peter Harris	Batten, Bowstead, Harris & Manning	2:08.15
2003	Lingo	4	Kieren Fallon	Lynda Ramsden	Swiss partners	2:06.42
2004	Blythe Knight	4	Frankie Dettori	Ed Dunlop	Maktoum Al Maktoum	2:21.60
2005	King's Thought	6	Darryll Holland	Steve Gollings	Mrs E Houlton	2:12.78
2006	All That And More	4	Michael Hills	Barry Hills	Gainsborough Stud	2:12.27
2007	Blue Bajan	5	Michael Hills	Andrew Turnell	Dr John Hollowood	2:08.23
2008 (Note: The 2008 race was run at Nottingham.)	Cabinet	4	Ryan Moore	Sir Michael Stoute	The Royal Ascot Racing Club	2:13.96
2009	Duncan	4	Jimmy Fortune	John Gosden	Normandie Stud Ltd	2:08.73
2010	Alainmaar	4	Richard Hills	Michael Jarvis	Hamdan Al Maktoum	2:06.99
2011	Spanish Duke	4	Eddie Ahern	John Dunlop	Windflower Overseas Holdings Inc	2:07.50
2012	Right Step	5	Jim Crowley	Alan Jarvis	Allen B Pope & Jarvis Associates	2:19.03
2013	Area Fifty One	5	Jamie Spencer	Richard Fahey	Marwan Koukash	2:08.10
2014	Sennockian Star	4	Silvestre de Sousa	Mark Johnston	The Vine Accord	2:08.96
2015	Collaboration	4	David Probert	Andrew Balding	Another Bottle Racing 2	2:11.06
2016	Dark Red	4	Franny Norton	Ed Dunlop	Hon R J Arculli	2:18.01
2017	Brorocco	4	Jimmy Quinn	Andrew Balding	Kingsclere Racing Club	2:07.89
2018	Ajman King	4	Andrea Atzeni	Roger Varian	Mohammed Obaid al Maktoum	2:08.59
2019	Mountain Angel	5	Andrea Atzeni	Roger Varian	Za Galadari	2:06.65
	no race 2020 (Note: The 2020 running was cancelled because of the COVID-19 pandemic in the United Kingdom)
2021	Victory Chime	6	Hector Crouch	Ralph Beckett	A Nevin	2:12.29
2022	Soto Sizzler	7	Ryan Moore	David Menuisier	I J Heseltine	2:09.04
2023	Bad Company	6	Pat Cosgrave	Jim Boyle	The Clean Sweep Partnership	2:19.20
2024	Crystal Delight	5	Jim Crowley	Harry Eustace	Little Staughton Farms Ltd	2:07.33
2025	City Of Delight	4	Harry Davies	David Menuisier	All For One Racing III & I Bandres	2:11.80
2026	Rathgar	6	Tom Marquand	Jack Channon	Crest Racing Xviii	2:09.36

== See also ==
- Horse racing in Great Britain
- List of British flat horse races

== Notes ==
- The 1940–1945 Epsom Spring Meetings were suspended due to curtailment of turf events during World War II.
