= William Stuart Stirling-Crawfurd =

Scottish racehorse owner

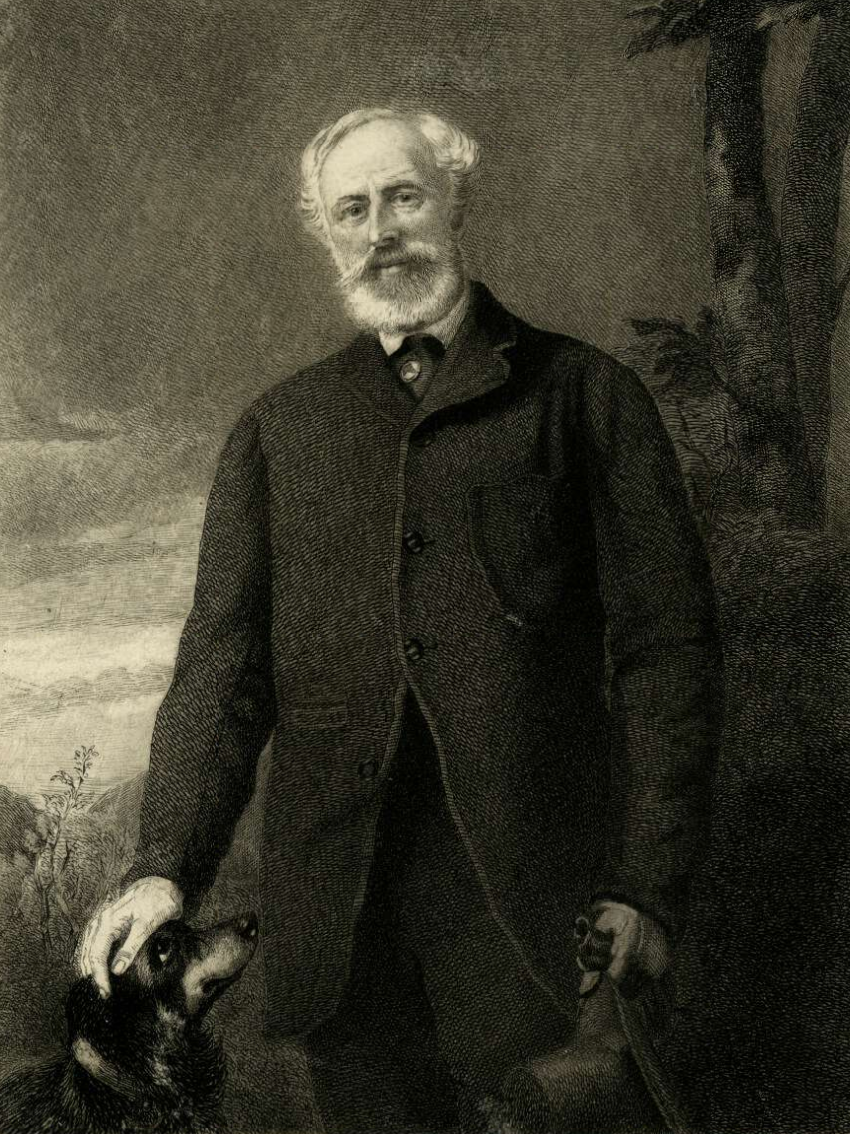
- Engraving of Stirling-Crawfurd, by Henry Richard Graves, c. 1870
- Born: 1819
- Died: 23 February 1883 (aged 63–64); Cannes, France
- Education: Trinity College, Cambridge
- Spouse: Caroline Graham, Duchess of Montrose (m. 1876)
- Parent(s): William Stirling; Mary Anderson
- Relatives: Harry Stirling Crawfurd Everard (nephew)

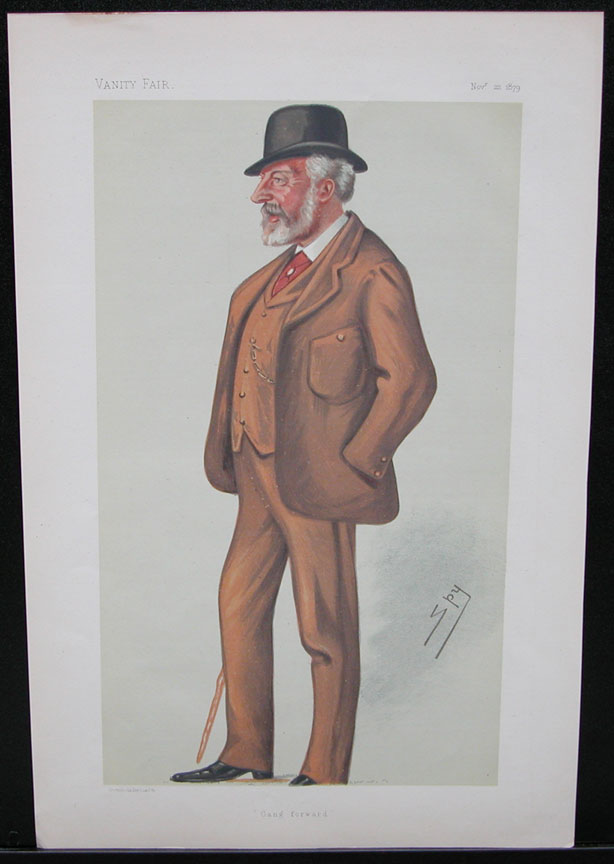
William Stuart Stirling-Crawfurd, caricature drawn by Spy (Leslie Ward) with caption "Gang Forward" (the name of his racehorse which won the 2,000 Guineas in 1873. Published in Vanity Fair, 22 November 1879

William Stuart Stirling-Crawfurd (1819 – 23 February 1883) of Milton in Lanarkshire, Scotland, was a prominent racehorse owner.

== Origins ==
He was the eldest son of Capt. William Stirling (1789–1826) of Milton and Castlemilk House, Rutherglen, both in Lanarkshire (now both suburbs of the City of Glasgow), 1st Dragoon Guards, who fought at the Battle of Waterloo in 1815, by his first wife Mary Anderson (d. 1819), a daughter of John Anderson of London. His father married secondly to Anne Charlotte Gibson-Maitland, a daughter of Sir Alexander Gibson-Maitland, Baronet, by whom he had further issue one son, James Stirling Stirling-Stuart and one daughter Helen Maitland Stirling, the mother of the golf writer Harry Stirling Crawfurd Everard (1848–1909).

Capt. William Stirling was the only son and heir of William Stirling, 13th Laird of Keir, Dunblane, in Perthshire and 9th Laird of Cawder, Bishopbriggs, Lanarkshire, by his wife Jean Stuart, youngest sister and heiress of Sir John Stuart, 5th Baronet (d.1797) of Milton and Castlemilk, (Stewart Baronets "of Castlemilk", created 1668) whose father the 4th Baronet briefly assumed the surname of Crawfurd on inheriting the estate of Milton, but dropped it on succeeding to the baronetcy on the death of his elder brother the 3rd Baronet.

== Career ==
All scarlet, horse racing colours of William Stuart Stirling-Crawfurd

The estate of Milton, adjoining the then expanding city of Glasgow, which he had inherited from his father, was very valuable. He was educated at Trinity College, Cambridge, during which time he became a well known figure in the local fox-hunts. In 1848 he won the Cesarewitch with The Cur. In 1850 he was elected a member of the Jockey Club, the regulating body of British horseracing. In 1859 he won the 1,000 Guineas with his mare Mayonnaise, trained by Tom Taylor, which won by 20 lengths, the widest winning margin ever. Her progeny however were disappointing.

William Stuart Stirling-Crawfurd was the patron of the racehorse trainer Alec Taylor, Senior, and financed the creation in 1870 of the famous Manton Training Stables on the Marlborough Downs in Wiltshire, which Taylor established as his base. The first Classic winner to be produced at Manton was Stirling-Crawfurd's colt Gang Forward (Scottish dialect for "going forward", the motto of the Scottish Clan Stirling) which won the 2,000 Guineas in 1873. In 1875 he won the St Leger with Craig Millar, trained by Alec Taylor. His other well-known horses included Prince George and Avontes.

In the 1880s his wife, the former Duchess of Montrose, entered her horses into races under her famous pseudonym "Mr. Manton", as women were then not allowed to own racehorses. The couple's racing activities were based in Newmarket in Suffolk, headquarters of the British horseracing industry, originally at the Bedford Lodge stables, on Bury Road, under the trainer Joe Dawson. They later moved their horses south across the road to Sefton Lodge, which the Duchess renamed after Stirling-Crawfurd's 1878 Derby winner "Sefton". Sefton Lodge was a large house, with nearby stables backing onto Long-Hill Gallops, built in 1872 by the prominent racehorse owner C.J.Lefrevre "in a picturesque Italian style". In about 1883 Stirling-Crawfurd and his wife enlarged the building in the same style.

=== Trophy from King of the Netherlands ===
King William III of the Netherlands (1817–1890) held an annual horserace at Dorn in Holland, which was won by Stirling-Crawfurd with the same horse in the years 1851 and 1852. For this feat the king awarded him an elaborate silver trophy, a centrepiece for a dining table, in the form of a lady hawking on horseback with a hawk-handler at her side. The design, by John Samuel Hunt, reflected the king's passion for that sport. The trophy was sold in 2017 by Salisbury auctioneers Woolley & Wallis for £36,000.

== Personal life ==
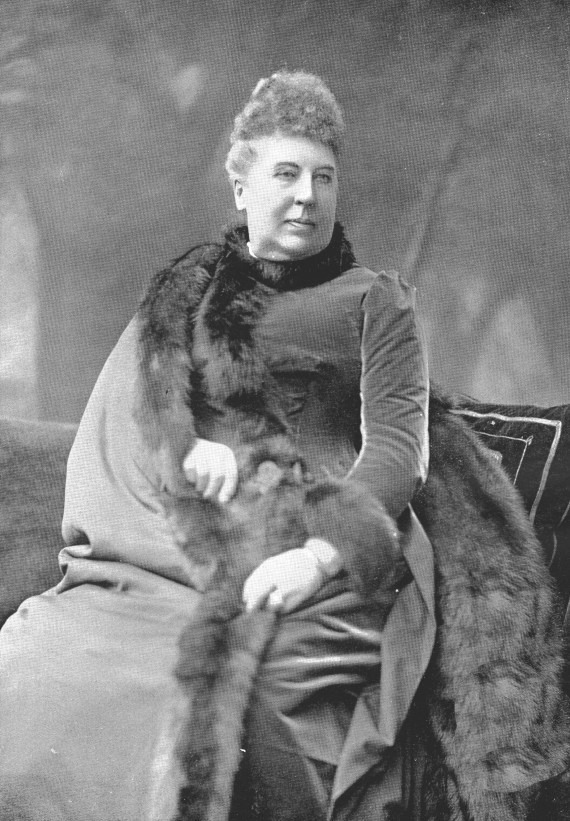
Caroline Agnes Horsley-Beresford (Duchess of Montrose), who raced under the pseudonym "Mr. Manton", wife of William Stuart Stirling-Crawfurd

In 1876 he married Caroline Agnes Horsley-Beresford (1818–1894), (Duchess of Montrose), aged 58, a daughter of John Horsley-Beresford, 2nd Baron Decies, widow of James Graham, 4th Duke of Montrose (1799–1874) and mother of the 5th Duke. She too was a notable racehorse owner, a "wildly extravagant woman" who "strode across the racing scene". The marriage was without issue.

In 1888, aged 70, she remarried thirdly to the 24 year-old Marcus Henry Milner (1864–1939), MVO, DSO, a racehorse trainer, soldier and cricketer 46 years her junior, and a cousin, both being descended from her great-grandfather Marcus Beresford, 1st Earl of Tyrone.

=== Death ===
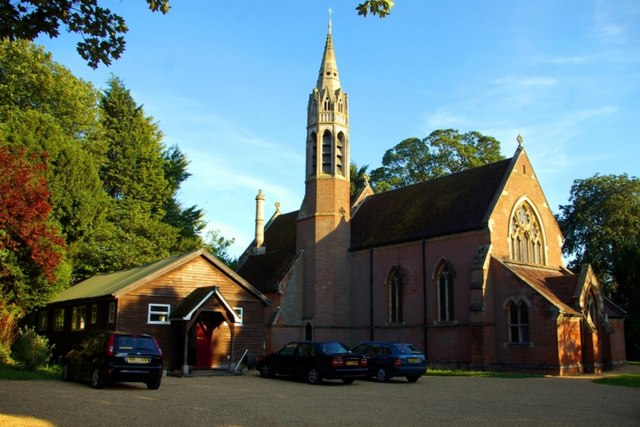
St Agnes' Church, Newmarket, built in memory of Stirling-Crawfurd by his widow the Duchess of Montrose, next to their Newmarket racing headquarters Sefton Lodge

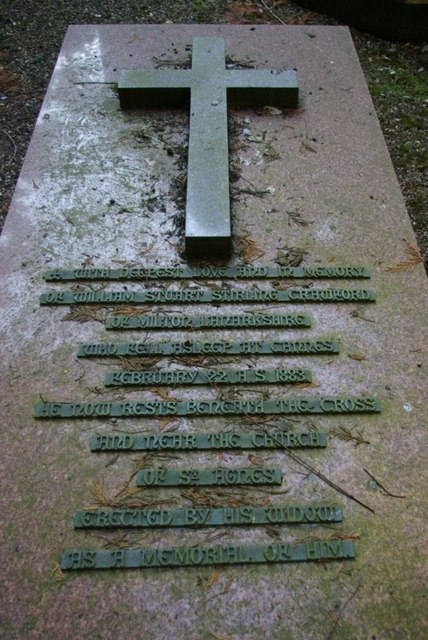
Grave of William Stuart Stirling-Crawfurd, St Agnes's Church, Newmarket, inscribed: With deepest love and in memory of William Stuart Stirling Crawford of Milton, Lanarkshire who fell asleep at Cannes, February 22 AS 1883. He now rests beneath the cross and near the church of St Agnes, erected by his wife as a memorial of him

He died in 1883 at his house in Cannes, South of France, without issue. Three years later in 1886, in his memory his widow built St Agnes's Church in Bury Road, to the immediate north-east of Sefton Lodge, in the churchyard of which his body was re-buried in 1888, beneath a large cross, as is inscribed on his gravestone. It is said to have the richest, most opulent 19th century interior in Suffolk, with unique examples of mosaic, tiling, stained glass and featuring a white marble bas-relief reredos showing the assumption of the virgin martyr St Agnes, holding a lamb and being lifted up to Heaven by angels from the Colosseum in Rome, the place of her martyrdom.

As patroness of the church which she had built, she had the power to hire and fire the vicar. The following stories are told: The weather during one summer had been atrocious which suited the duchess, if no-one else, as she had a runner in the St. Leger which had any sort of chance only on very soft ground. She was horrified when, one Sunday, the Rev. Colville Wallis led his congregation in praying for a fine spell so farmers could gather in the harvest. She took him to one side afterwards and told him: “Do that again, and I’ll sack you.” The horse did not win, but the vicar kept his job.. The duchess was popular in the racing world, but had an acid tongue at times. She hated all handicappers, convinced that they always treated her horses unfairly. She called one, “The man who murdered his mother.” Some of her trainers did not fare much better. At one point she had horses trained by a Mr. Peace at Lambourn. She described him as “the Peace that passeth all understanding.”

== Succession ==
He entailed his estates on his younger half-brother James Stirling Stirling-Stuart (1825–1887), who had inherited the Castlemilk estate from their father, but also provided a generous bequest of £120,000 to his wife, in addition to the funds he granted to her by a marriage settlement. The bequest was challenged by James, who attempted unsuccessfully to have the will dismissed as a forgery as Stirling-Crawfurd was in the habit of signing his legal documents with a metal stamp, as he suffered from scrivener's palsy which made his right hand tremble when he attempted to write.
