= Alec Taylor Sr. =

English racehorse trainer

Alec Taylor, Senior

Alec Taylor Sr. (1821/23–1894) was an English racehorse trainer who in 1870 established the surviving famous Manton training stables on the Marlborough Downs in Wiltshire, one of the finest training centres in the country. He was considered one of the best trainers of his era and during his career of about 50 years he won a total of 12 classics, ending in 1887 with Reve d'Or at the Oaks and 1000 Guineas, together with wins in numerous other important English races.

== Origins & childhood ==
Alec Taylor was born in 1823 at Kirkby Lonsdale in Yorkshire, the son of Thomas Taylor ("Tom") whose own father had served as a racehorse trainer to Philip Stanhope, 5th Earl of Chesterfield (1755–1815). Tom soon moved to Murton near York to serve as stud groom to the prominent but corrupt breeder Robert Ridsdale (1783–1857), who had himself started his career as a groom and made a fortune in bookmaking which allowed him to acquire a string of racehorses. In association with John Gulley (like himself a "rags-to-riches figure", a tavern-keeper, boxer and bookmaker - but in addition a Member of Parliament) Ridsdale won the 1832 Derby with St Giles. However, soon after Ridsdale suffered financial difficulties and in about 1836 Tom Taylor moved to Bretby Hall in Derbyshire to work as the private racehorse trainer and stud manager for George Stanhope, 6th Earl of Chesterfield (1805–1866) (the son of his father's former employer) and eventually set up on his own account as a trainer at Newmarket.

== Career ==
Lord Chesterfield provided a "wonderful opportunity" to young Alec, who had all the while been learning the art of racehorse training at his father's side. This was in the form of an introduction to two of his wealthy racing acquaintances in need of a private trainer, namely Sir Joseph Henry Hawley, 3rd Baronet (1813–1875) of Leybourne Grange near Maidstone in Kent, where he owned a stud, and John Stanley ("J.M. Stanley") (of uncertain identity), who had met in Florence, Italy, whilst Hawley was yachting around the Mediterranean. Hawley had "run a few horses against the locals" at the racecourse in the Cascine Park, where Stanley introduced himself and suggested the two should go into partnership on the "greener grass of home". The partnership was first established in a public training yard at Newmarket, the centre of English horse racing, and was very successful having won the 1847 Oaks with Miami, trained by William Beresford.

Soon they decided to establish a yard of their own, away from the "goldfish bowl" of Newmarket, where they could develop their horses out of the public view. To this end they acquired for £3,000 the 8-box yard of Tom Parr at Fyfield, just west of Marlborough on the old Bath Road, in Wiltshire, who although he had achieved some success with wins in the Goodwood Stakes, the Cesarewitch and two wins in both the St Leger and the Gold Cup, had been unable to manage his finances. Alec was hired in about 1848 and his first task was to supervise the expansion of the accommodation to about 40 boxes. Included in the sale were all fixtures and equipment and two horses including Fernhill, which under Alec's training won the 1849 Great Metropolitan Handicap at Epsom, having been backed by Hawley to win £20,000, which paid for the purchase price of the yard many times over, albeit Hawley had to hire "a host of labourers" at his own cost to clear snow off the course so the race could proceed. Alec's next wins were in 1851 with Aphrodite in the 1000 Guineas and Teddington in the Derby, both owned by Hawley. It was the first of what would be eleven wins in the five British Classics.

After these wins Sir Joseph Hawley left and Taylor continued as private trainer for John Stanley until 1856 when Stanley retired. This left Taylor a tenant at Fyfield to continue as a public trainer. George Brudenell-Bruce, 2nd Marquess of Ailesbury (1804-1878) of nearby Tottenham House, Great Bedwyn, Wiltshire, sent some horses to Taylor which soon resulted in St Albans winning the 1860 Chester Cup and St Leger. In 1864 Palmerston came second in the Derby and in 1866 Savernake also came second in the Derby for the same owner. This success attracted the attention of the Scottish aristocrat and millionaire William Stuart Stirling-Crawfurd (1819-1883) ("Craw"), a property developer in Glasgow and coal mine owner, who took his horses to Fyfield having been double crossed by his previous trainer. In 1868 Taylor sent Craw's Moslem to dead-heat for the 2,000 Guineas.

By 1870, with the patronage and financial backing of Stirling-Crawfurd, Taylor acquired a large estate at Manton on the Marlborough Downs in Wiltshire, adjoining Fyfield. The new Manton Down stables, built to Taylor's design and comprising very spacious loose-boxes around a large central courtyard, were adjacent to the Fyfield Down gallops which Taylor had used and developed since he arrived at Fyfield in 1848. Taylor created at Manton one of Britain's "most famous and prestigious training facilities"; it was said that:

Those fortunate enough to visit the Manton establishment cannot fail to be impressed by the completeness of every detail. The buildings possess a singularly attractive and quiet beauty. [There are] spacious paddocks, splendid stables, and boxes [stalls] unsurpassed for size and abundance of light and air.

In 1873 Stirling-Crawfurd's Gang Forward won the 2000 Guineas race, the first of Taylor's eight classic winners from Manton. Following Stirling-Crawfurd's death in 1883 his widow the dowager Duchess of Montrose, a formidable character and successful owner, moved her horses to Sefton Lodge in Newmarket, named after her husband's Derby winner. As women were then disallowed from owning racehorses, she used the pseudonym "Mr Manton", by which she became well known. In 1884 the Duke of Beaufort moved his horses to Manton under Taylor's care.

== Demanding employer ==
He had a reputation for punishing his employees. A former employee of Taylor remarked: A breakfast at Manton had consisted of tea, bread, and cuts from a riding crop, with the only second helpings coming from the crop. In 1863 Taylor's jockey Eli Drew died following a fall at Brighton Racecourse aged 21. Drew had arrived at Fyfield aged 11 and Taylor. his wife and the other apprentices and lads were the only family he had. He was a promising young jockey and had won a number of races for Taylor including a Caesarewich. Alec Taylor constructed a Lych Gate to Fyfield Churchyard. The woodwork had rotted by the 1930s and had to be removed but the two stone gateposts still bear the inscription 'In Memory of Eli Drew'

== Classic Race wins ==
Taylor's wins in the British Classic Races include:

2,000 Guineas

- Moslem (1868), Gang Forward (1873)

1,000 Guineas

- Aphrodite (1851), Thebais (1881), Reve d'Or (1887)

Epsom Derby

- Teddington (1851), Sefton (1878)

Epsom Oaks

- Thebais (1881), Reve d'Or (1887)

St. Leger Stakes

- St. Albans (1860), Craig Millar (1875)

== Succession ==
Alec Taylor Sr. died in 1894 and was buried in Fyfield Churchyard, his gravestone being situated just west of the Church Tower, later joined by other family members. Following his death, his sons Tom Taylor and Alec Taylor Jr., by his first and second wives respectively, ran Manton from 1895. Alec Taylor, Jr., known as the "Wizard of Manton", became a successful trainer, and was reputed not to heavily train or race young horses until they were two years of age, unlike his father who is said to have galloped his yearlings.

== Sources ==
- Mathieu, Paul, The Masters of Manton, From Alec Taylor to George Todd, London, 2010
