= Sefton (racehorse) =

British-bred Thoroughbred racehorse

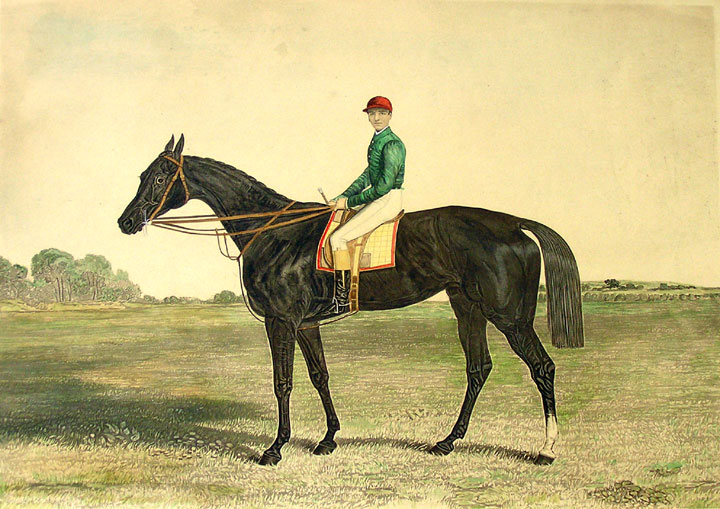
- Hand-coloured engraving of Sefton and Henry Constable
- Sire: Speculum
- Grandsire: Vedette
- Dam: Lady Sefton
- Damsire: West Australian
- Sex: Stallion
- Foaled: 1875
- Country: United Kingdom of Great Britain and Ireland
- Colour: Bay
- Breeder: Glasgow Stud, Enfield, Middlesex (owned by James Carr-Boyle, 5th Earl of Glasgow)
- Owner: William Stuart Stirling-Crawfurd
- Trainer: Alec Taylor Sr.
- Record: 11: 3-2-2
- Earnings: £

Major wins
- City and Suburban Handicap (1878); Epsom Derby (1878); Newmarket St. Leger (1878)

Sefton (1875–1891) was a British Thoroughbred racehorse and sire. In a career that lasted from 1877 to 1878 he ran thirteen times and won three races. He showed little promise as a two-year-old, but developed into a leading colt the following year, when his wins included the 1878 Epsom Derby. At the end of the season he was retired to stud where he had little success. He was put down in 1891. The famous "Sefton Lodge" stables in Newmarket, owned by the horse's owner, were named after him.

== Background ==
Sefton, a dark-coated bay horse with one white sock, was bred by Jonathan Peel at the Glasgow Stud (owned by James Carr-Boyle, 5th Earl of Glasgow) at Enfield, Middlesex. As a yearling was sold for 1,000 guineas to William Stuart Stirling-Crawfurd (1819–1883) of Milton in Lanarkshire, Scotland (now a suburb of Glasgow), an "old school" sportsman who had married the widow of the Duke of Montrose. Sefton was trained at Manton by Alec Taylor Sr., who had established his training facility there in 1870 under the patronage of Stirling-Crawfurd.

Sefton's sire Speculum was a top class stayer who won the Goodwood Cup. He went on to be a successful and influential sire, being the male-line ancestor of the Derby winners Sunstar and Phil Drake. Sefton's achievements enabled Speculum to become Champion sire in 1878. Sefton's dam was an unnamed mare by West Australian who was later given the name Lady Sefton. During Sefton's career, she was usually known as "Liverpool's dam" after a good colt she had produced in 1869.

== Racing career ==
=== 1877: two-year-old season ===
Sefton raced four times as a two-year-old without success. His best performance came at Stockbridge Racecourse in June, when he finished second to Redwing in the Hurstbourne Stakes. He was unplaced in the Richmond Stakes at Goodwood in July and the Criterion Stakes in October.

=== 1878: three-year-old season ===
Sefton made his debut as a three-year-old in the inaugural running of the Craven Stakes at Newmarket in April. He showed form far in advance of anything he had shown in 1877 by finishing half a length second to Thurio, with the pair well clear of the thirteen other runners. Sefton's next race was an unusual one for a Classic contender, as he took on older horses in the valuable City and Suburban Handicap at Epsom on 30 April. Carrying only 78 pounds he disputed the lead from the start, went to the front early in the straight and held on in a close finish to win by a head from the five-year-old Advance. On his next start Sefton ran in the 2000 Guineas at Newmarket on 7 May. He led for most of the race and stayed on after being overtaken in the final furlong to prove the best of the English colts, finishing third to the filly Pilgrimage and the French-trained Insulaire.

At Epsom Sefton, looking much fitter than he had done at Newmarket, started at odds of 100/12 (just over 8/1) in a field of twenty-two for the Derby on 6 June. Insulaire, who had won the Prix du Jockey Club a few days earlier, was made favourite ahead of Bonnie Scotland. The weather was miserable, and the customary large crowd was not so impressive as in previous years. Ridden by Henry Constable (1854–1881), Sefton was sent to the front after a furlong and never headed. In the straight he held of the challenges of Childeric and the fast-finishing Insulaire to win by one and a half lengths. In addition to the prize money of £5,850, Stirling-Crawfurd was reported to have taken £21,000 in winning bets.

Sefton was then sent to Royal Ascot where he ran in the Prince of Wales's Stakes. Carrying top weight of 131 pounds, he made a "gallant effort" but could only manage a dead-heat for third place behind Glengarry, to whom he was conceding sixteen pounds. Sefton had not been entered in the Doncaster St Leger, but returned at Newmarket in October when he defeated Insulaire again in the Newmarket St Leger. Sefton's final race was in the Cesarewitch Handicap over two and a quarter miles, for which he was assigned the second highest weight of 112 pounds, five pounds more than Insulaire. He was never a danger and finished eighth of the twenty runners behind Jester. Sefton returned from the race injured, and was unable to race again.

== Stud career ==
Sefton made little impact as a stallion and suffered increasingly from rheumatism. By 1891 he was in a "bad way" with "fever in the feet" (most likely laminitis) and was euthanized on 12 August 1891.

== Pedigree ==
Pedigree of Sefton (GB), bay stallion, 1875
Sire Speculum (GB) 1865	Vedette; 1854	Voltigeur	Voltaire
Sire Speculum (GB) 1865	Vedette; 1854	Voltigeur	Martha Lynn
Sire Speculum (GB) 1865	Vedette; 1854	Mrs Ridgway	Birdcatcher
Sire Speculum (GB) 1865	Vedette; 1854	Mrs Ridgway	Nan Darrell
Sire Speculum (GB) 1865	Doralice; 1852	Orlando	Touchstone*
Sire Speculum (GB) 1865	Doralice; 1852	Orlando	Vulture
Sire Speculum (GB) 1865	Doralice; 1852	Preserve	Emilius
Sire Speculum (GB) 1865	Doralice; 1852	Preserve	Mustard
Dam Lady Sefton (GB) 1861	West Australian; 1850	Melbourne	Humphrey Clinker
Dam Lady Sefton (GB) 1861	West Australian; 1850	Melbourne	Cervantes mare
Dam Lady Sefton (GB) 1861	West Australian; 1850	Mowerina	Touchstone*
Dam Lady Sefton (GB) 1861	West Australian; 1850	Mowerina	Emma
Dam Lady Sefton (GB) 1861	Clarissa; 1846	Pantaloon	Castrel
Dam Lady Sefton (GB) 1861	Clarissa; 1846	Pantaloon	Idalia
Dam Lady Sefton (GB) 1861	Clarissa; 1846	Glencoe mare	Glencoe
Dam Lady Sefton (GB) 1861	Clarissa; 1846	Glencoe mare	Frolicksome (Family: 25)

* Sefton is inbred 4S x 4D to the stallion Touchstone, meaning that he appears fourth generation on the sire side of his pedigree and fourth generation on the dam side of his pedigree.
