= Harry Stirling Crawfurd Everard =

Harry Stirling Crawfurd Everard (1848–1909) was an English writer on golf.

== Life ==
Born at Claybrook House, Leicestershire, on 30 January 1848, he was only son of Henry Everard of Gosberton, near Spalding, Lincolnshire, by his wife Helen Maitland. daughter by his second wife of Captain William Stirling of Milton and Castlemilk, Lanarkshire. After education at Eton College (1862–6) he matriculated at Christ Church, Oxford, on 23 May 1866, graduating B.A. in 1871.

A student at the Inner Temple in 1867, Everard was not called to the bar. He settled at St Andrews, to which he was attracted by the golf course. He enjoyed success at golf, winning in the competitions of The Royal and Ancient Golf Club Silver Medal (second prize at the spring meeting) in 1888, the Calcutta cup in 1888 and 1890, and the Silver Cross (the first prize) in 1891. He was successful in competitions at Carnoustie and Montrose. He was also a cricketer, tennis player, pedestrian and swimmer.

Everard died, after a short illness, on 15 May 1909 at St. Andrews.

== Works ==
Everard known as a writer on golf, contributing to the Scots Observer and to the National Observer (under William Ernest Henley's editorship), to The Spectator, Saturday Review, and many specialist golfing periodicals. He published Golf in Theory and Practice (1897; 3rd edit. 1898); A History of the Royal & Ancient Club of St. Andrews from 1754–1900 (1907), and he wrote on "Some Celebrated Golfers" for the Badminton Library golf manual (1890; 5th edit. 1895).

== Family ==
Everard married in 1880 Annie, eldest surviving daughter of Colonel Robert Tod Boothby of St. Andrews (d. 1907). They had two sons and two daughters.

== Notes ==
Attribution

This article incorporates text from a publication now in the public domain: Lee, Sidney, ed. (1912). "Everard, Harry Stirling Crawfurd". Dictionary of National Biography (2nd supplement). Vol. 1. London: Smith, Elder & Co.
