= Sir George Chetwynd, 4th Baronet =

English Baronet (1849–1917)

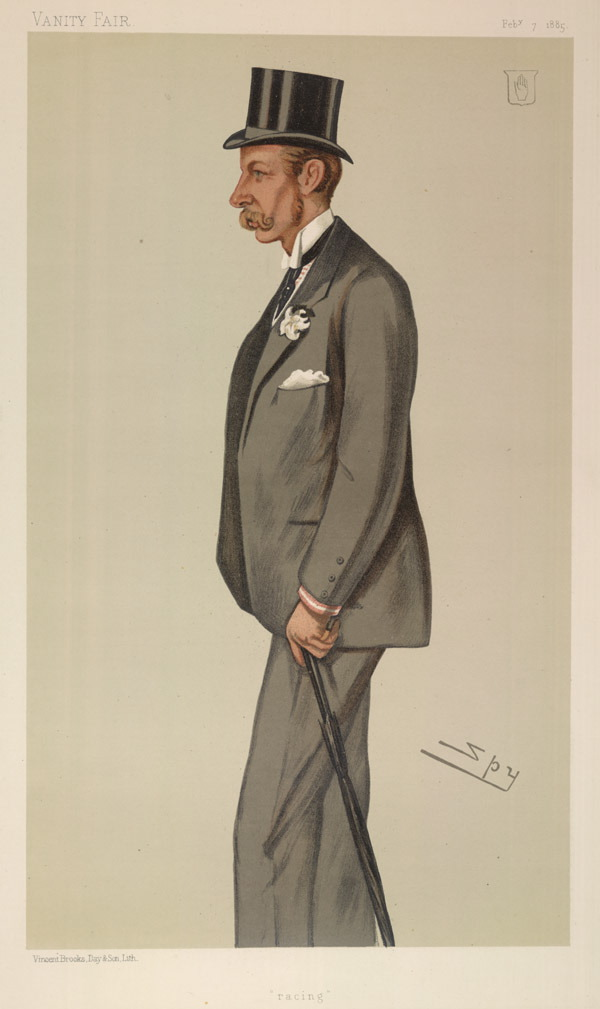
"racing". Caricature of Sir George Chetwynd, Bt. by Spy published in Vanity Fair in 1885.

Sir George Chetwynd, 4th Baronet of Brocton Hall (31 May 1849 – 10 March 1917) was the heir to the Chetwynd baronetcy upon the death of his father in 1869.

== Life ==
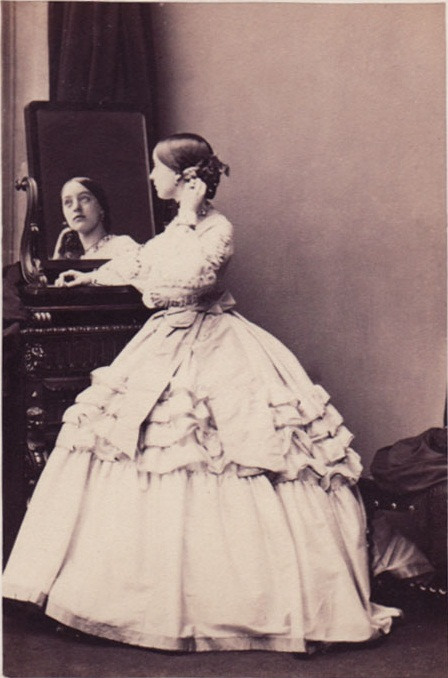
Lady Florence Paget by Camille Silvy

Chetwynd was born in Mayfair, London in 1849, the son of the 3rd Baronet and Lady Charlotte Augusta Hill, the daughter of the 3rd Marquess of Downshire.

In 1870 he married Lady Florence Cecilia Paget, daughter of the 2nd Marquess of Anglesey and the widow of the 4th Marquess of Hastings. She was a great beauty, known as the "Pocket Venus". Their son George Guy Chetwynd, who became the 5th Baronet, was born in 1874. Their daughter Lilian Florence Chetwynd married her mother's nephew and her first cousin, Henry Paget, 5th Marquess of Anglesey.

Sir George Chetwynd, 4th Baronet, was the High Sheriff of Warwickshire in 1875 and owned about 6700 acres in 1907.

He was an owner of racing horses and a gambler. His first horses were purchased on his behalf by James Octavius Machell and kept at Bedford Cottage stables, Newmarket. At this time, Sir George was under age and his horses ran under the name of Mr Mortimer. When he came of age in 1870 he moved his horses to Hednesford to be near his residence of Grendon Hall in Warwickshire. Some of his notable successes include: winning of the 1877 Ascot Stakes by Chypre, winning of the 1883 Stewards' Cup at Goodwood by the 6-year old Hornpipe. and winning of the 1888 City and Suburban Handicap by the 5-year old Fullerton ridden by J. Woodburn. Sir George once declared that he made £6,000 per year from racing. Charles Wood was Sir George's principal jockey.

In 1887, Lord Durham gave a speech at the Gimcrack Club intimating wrongdoings with the running of the horses at Chetwynd's stable. Chetwynd's initial reaction was to challenge Durham to a duel. However, Durham called this cheap valour and allowed the matter to be settled by the Jockey Club. Chetwynd was only partly vindicated by the arbitration, awarded just a farthing in damages and had to pay his own costs. In consequence, he resigned from the Jockey Club.

In 1885 Chetwynd was involved with a bout of fisticuffs in Hyde Park with Lord Lonsdale over the favours of Lillie Langtry. She had been out riding along Rotten Row with Lonsdale when she stopped to talk to Chetwynd. Remarks were passed between the two gentlemen before they came to blows and had to be parted.

One evening in 1892 Chetwynd invited George Alexander Baird to dine with him at his London House, 36 Curzon Street. Baird expressed his admiration for the house and Chetwynd sold it to him on the spot with all fixtures and fitting. Baird woke next morning in the master bedroom, the new owner, confused and hung over.

Baronetage of Great Britain
| Preceded by George Chetwynd | Baronet (of Brocton Hall); 1869–1917 | Succeeded by George Guy Chetwynd |
