= James Graham, 4th Duke of Montrose =

British politician (1799–1874)

His Grace The Duke of Montrose KT PC
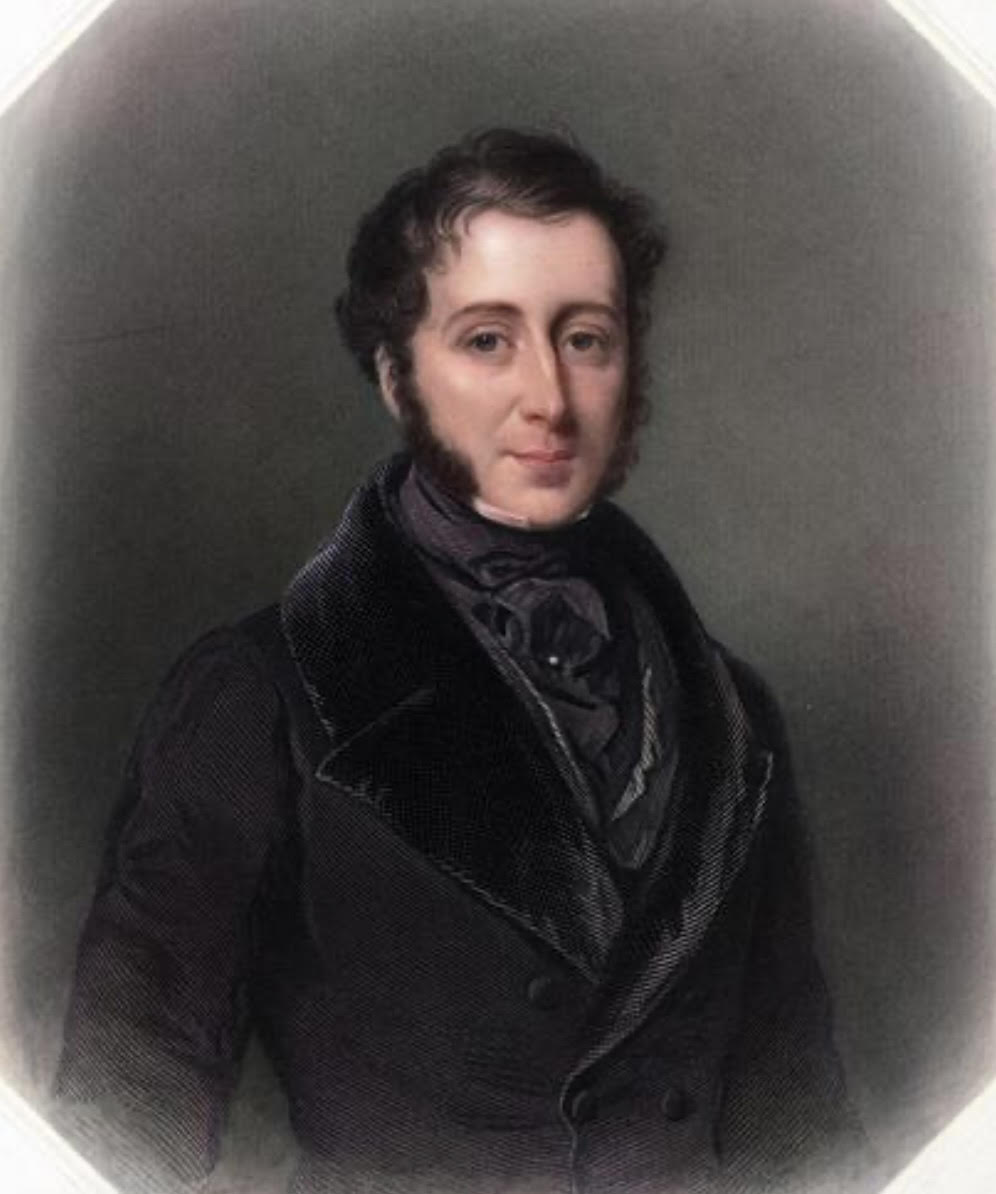

Chancellor of the Duchy of Lancaster
- In office 26 February 1858 – 11 June 1859
- Monarch: Victoria
- Prime Minister: The Earl of Derby
- Preceded by: Matthew Talbot Baines
- Succeeded by: Sir George Grey, Bt

Postmaster General
- In office 19 July 1866 – 1 December 1868
- Monarch: Victoria
- Prime Minister: The Earl of Derby; Benjamin Disraeli
- Preceded by: The Lord Stanley of Alderley
- Succeeded by: Marquess of Hartington

Personal details
- Born: 16 July 1799
- Died: 30 December 1874 (aged 75) Cannes, Provence, France
- Party: Conservative
- Spouse: Hon. Caroline Horsley-Beresford (m. 1836)
- Children: Douglas Graham, 5th Duke of Montrose; Violet, Lady Greville
- Parent(s): James Graham, 3rd Duke of Montrose; Lady Caroline Montagu
- Education: Trinity College, Cambridge

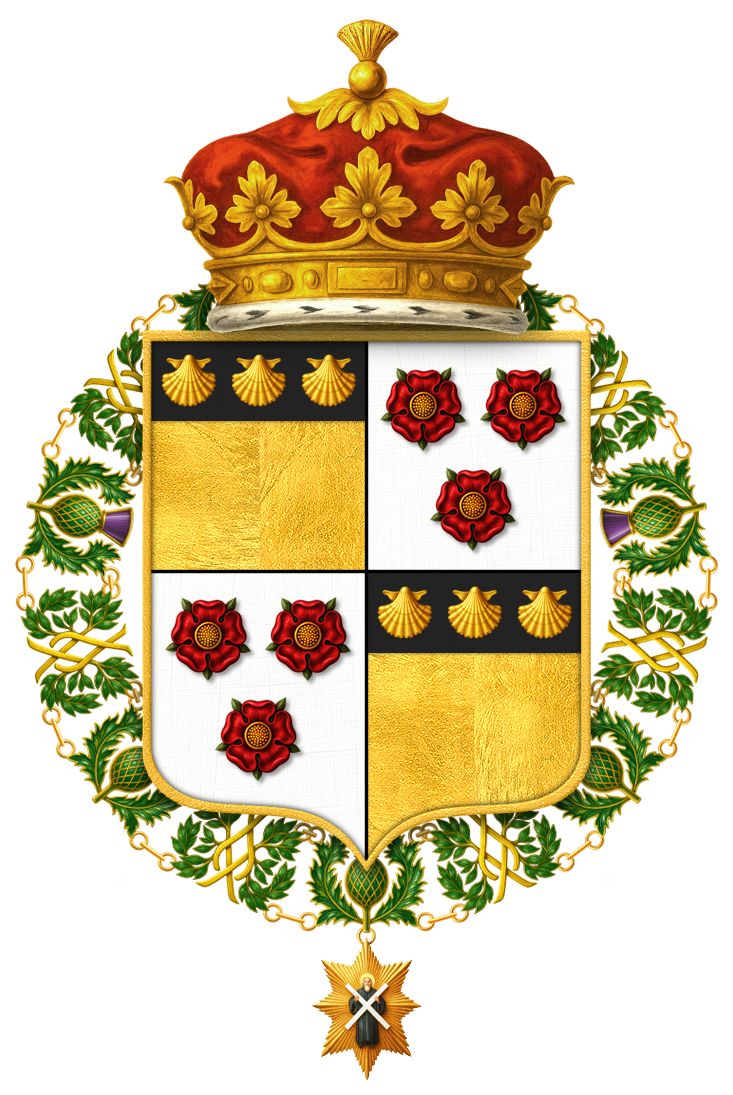
Shield of Arms of James Graham, 4th Duke of Montrose, KT, PC

James Graham, 4th Duke of Montrose, KT, PC (16 July 1799 – 30 December 1874), styled Marquess of Graham until 1836, of Buchanan Castle, Stirlingshire and 45 Belgrave Square, London, was a British Conservative politician.

== Background and education ==
Montrose was the son of James Graham, 3rd Duke of Montrose, by his second wife Lady Caroline Maria, daughter of George Montagu, 4th Duke of Manchester. He was educated at Eton and Trinity College, Cambridge.

=== Cricket ===
A member of Marylebone Cricket Club, Montrose made a single appearance for an England team against Hampshire in 1828. He was recorded in the scorecard as Lord James Graham and scored two runs.

== Political career ==
In 1821, aged 21, Montrose was appointed Vice-Chamberlain of the Household, despite not having a seat in Parliament, and was sworn of the Privy Council the same year. He remained as Vice-Chamberlain until 1827. He was returned to Parliament for Cambridge in 1825, a seat he held until 1832, and served as a commissioner of the India Board between 1828 and 1830. In 1836 he succeeded his father in the dukedom and entered the House of Lords.

When the Earl of Derby became Prime Minister in February 1852, Montrose was appointed Lord Steward of the Household, a post he retained until the government fell in December of the same year. He again served under Derby as Chancellor of the Duchy of Lancaster between 1858 and 1859 and under Derby and later Benjamin Disraeli as Postmaster General between 1866 and 1868, although he was never a member of the Cabinet. As Postmaster General he introduced the Electric Telegraphs Bill which resulted in the transfer of British telegraph companies to the Post Office.

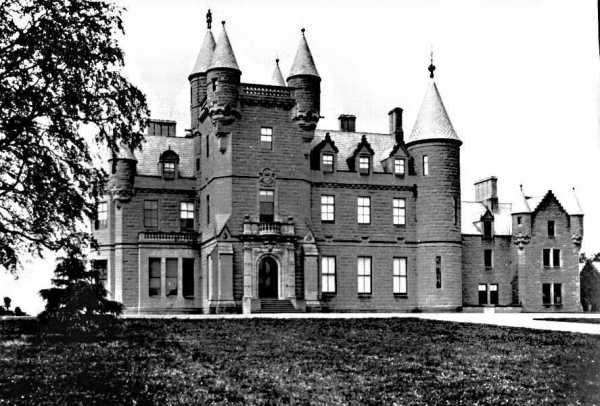
Castle Buchanan, rebuilt by the 4th Duke after fire.

Apart from his political career Montrose served as Chancellor of the University of Glasgow between 1837 and 1874 (succeeding his father) and as Lord Lieutenant of Stirlingshire between 1843 and 1874. He was made a Knight of the Thistle in 1845.

== Marriage and issue ==
In 1836, Montrose married Hon. Caroline Agnes Horsley-Beresford (1818–1894), daughter of John Beresford, 2nd Baron Decies and grand-niece of the 1st Marquess of Waterford. In 1860, they were both survivors of the train involved in the Atherstone rail accident. She survived him and in 1876 married secondly to William Stuart Stirling-Crawfurd. By his wife he had issue including:

=== Sons ===
- Lord James John Graham (1845–1846), who died in infancy.
- Lord James Graham (1847–1872), styled by the courtesy title of Marquess of Graham, eldest surviving son and heir apparent, who predeceased his father by two years.
- Douglas Beresford Malise Ronald Graham, 5th Duke of Montrose (1852–1925), only surviving son and heir, who married Violet Hermione Graham, second daughter of Sir Frederick Ulric Graham, 3rd Baronet.

=== Daughters ===
- Lady Agnes Caroline Graham (1839–1873), who married Lt. Col. John Murray of Touchadam and Polmaise in 1859.
- Lady Beatrice Violet Graham (1842–1932), was a writer (she married Algernon Greville, 2nd Baron Greville in 1863).
- Lady Alma Imogen Leonora Carlotta Graham DStJ (1854–1932), who married Gavin Campbell, 1st Marquess of Breadalbane in 1872.

== Death ==
He died at Cannes in December 1874, aged 75, and was succeeded in the dukedom by his son, Douglas Graham, 5th Duke of Montrose (1852–1925).

Parliament of the United Kingdom
Preceded by Frederick Trench; Charles Cheere	Member of Parliament for Cambridge; 1825–1832; With: Frederick Trench	Succeeded by George Pryme; Thomas Rice
Political offices
Preceded by Viscount Jocelyn	Vice-Chamberlain of the Household; 1821–1827	Succeeded by Sir Samuel Hulse
Preceded by The Marquess of Westminster	Lord Steward; 1852	Succeeded by The Duke of Norfolk
Preceded by Matthew Talbot Baines	Chancellor of the Duchy of Lancaster; 1858–1859	Succeeded by Sir George Grey, Bt
Preceded by The Lord Stanley of Alderley	Postmaster General; 1866–1868	Succeeded by Marquess of Hartington
Academic offices
Preceded by The 3rd Duke of Montrose	Chancellor of the University of Glasgow; 1837–1874	Succeeded by Sir William Stirling-Maxwell, Bt
Honorary titles
Preceded by The Lord Abercromby	Lord Lieutenant of Stirlingshire; 1843–1874	Succeeded by The Earl of Dunmore
Peerage of Scotland
Preceded by James Graham	Duke of Montrose; 1836–1874	Succeeded by Douglas Graham
