= 1811 in sports =

1811 in sports describes the year's events in world sport.

== Boxing ==
Events

- Tom Cribb retains his English championship, defeating American Tom Molineaux on 28 September in the 11th round of a highly anticipated return bout.

== Cricket ==
Events

- In time for the start of the 1811 season, Marylebone Cricket Club (MCC) reluctantly follows Thomas Lord to his new Middle Ground, the lease on the original Lord's Old Ground having expired. MCC are resident at the Middle Ground for the next three years.
- Only one first-class match is recorded as the Napoleonic War takes its toll of cricket's manpower and investment.

England

- Most runs – William Lambert 51
- Most wickets – Thomas Howard 8

== Horse racing ==
England

- 2,000 Guineas Stakes – Trophonius
- The Derby – Phantom
- The Oaks – Sorcery
- St. Leger Stakes – Soothsayer
