= Sorcery (horse) =

British-bred Thoroughbred racehorse

- Sire: Sorcerer
- Grandsire: Trumpator
- Dam: Cobbea
- Damsire: Skyscraper
- Sex: Mare
- Foaled: 1808
- Country: United Kingdom of Great Britain and Ireland
- Colour: Bay
- Breeder: 5th Duke of Rutland or Lord Rous
- Owner: 5th Duke of Rutland
- Trainer: R D Boyce
- Record: 26: 12-8-3

Major wins
- Oaks Stakes (1811); July three-year-old Stakes (1811); October Oatlands Stakes (1811); Match against Sprightly (1811); Oatlands Stakes (1812); Epsom Gold Cup (1812); Trial Stakes (1812); Match against Asmodeus (1813); King's Plate (Newmarket) (1814)

Sorcery (1808 – after 1832) was a British Thoroughbred racehorse and broodmare who won the classic Oaks Stakes at Epsom Downs Racecourse in 1811. In a racing career which lasted from April 1811 to July 1814 the filly ran twenty-six times, winning twelve races and finishing placed on eleven occasions. Sorcery won the Oaks on her third racecourse appearance and went on to win other important races including the Epsom Gold Cup, the Trial Stakes, two editions of the Oatlands Stakes, a King's Plate and several match races. After her retirement from racing she became a successful broodmare, being the dam of the 1828 Epsom Derby winner Cadland.

== Background ==
Sorcery was a bay mare bred either by Lord Rous or by John Manners, 5th Duke of Rutland who owned her during her racing career. Her sire, Sorcerer, was bred by Sir Charles Bunbury and was a half-brother of the 1801 Derby winning mare Eleanor. Sorcerer was an unusually large black horse who won several important races and became a successful breeding stallion. His progeny included the Derby winner Smolensko, the 2000 Guineas winners Wizard and Trophonius, and the Oaks winners Maid of Orleans and Morel. Sorcerer was the Leading sire in Great Britain and Ireland in 1811, 1812 and 1813.

Sorcery was the first foal of her dam, Cobbea, a mare bred by the Duke of Bedford. Cobbea went on to produce eight other live foals including Witchery (1814) who became a successful broodmare.

== Racing career ==
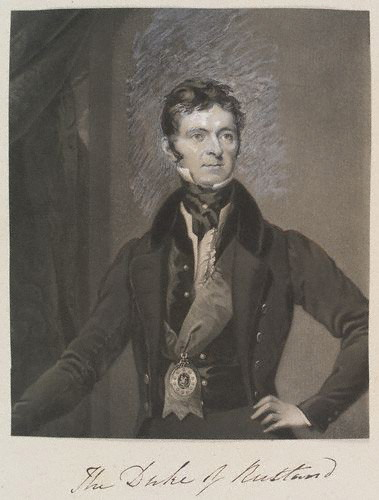
The 5th Duke of Rutland, who bred and owned Sorcery

=== 1811: three-year-old season ===
Sorcery made her first racecourse appearance on 16 April 1811 at Newmarket's Craven meeting. In a Sweepstakes over the Abington Mile course she started the 2/1 second favourite and won from General Gower's unnamed filly. At the next Newmarket meeting on 1 May Sorcery ran in the Newmarket Stakes over the Ditch Mile course and finished third of the seven runners behind the 2000 Guineas winner Trophonius.

On 1 June, Sorcery was one of twelve fillies from an original entry of forty to contest the Oaks Stakes over one and half miles at Epsom. For unexplained reasons, Sorcery had been nominated for the race by both the Duke of Rutland and by Lord Rous, meaning that the 50 guinea entry fee had been paid twice. Ridden by Sam Chifney, Jr., a jockey who specialised in holding up horses for a late run, she started favourite at odds of 3/1. The early running was made by Lord Grosvenor's filly Barrosa who led the field until overtaken inside the final quarter mile by Sir Frank Standish's sister to Pirouette. Sorcery was then produced with a decisive "Chifney rush" in the final strides to take the lead and win "cleverly". At Newmarket's July meeting, Sorcery easily defeated the Duke of Grafton's filly Joke, her only opponent in the July Stakes for three-year-olds.

Sorcery reappeared for the autumn meetings at Newmarket, where she had seven engagements, although she ran only four times. On 30 September she won a ten furlong race for three-year-old fillies, beating Lord George Cavendish's sister to Black Diamond. Later in the week, the Duke of Rutland was able to claim a 200 guinea prize without running Sorcery, when Mr Charlton's filly Arquebusade failed to appear for a scheduled match race. On 17 October, Sorcery contested the second class of the Oatlands Stakes, a handicap race over the Rowley Mile. Carrying a weight of 103 pounds, she started 5/2 second favourite and won from six opponents. Two days later, Sorcery successfully conceded seven pounds to Mr Blake's filly Sprightly in a 100 guinea match over the Ditch Mile. On 29 October Sorcery won a further 200 guineas when the Duke of Grafton's colt Nimrod was withdrawn from a match against the filly. Later that week, Sorcery was withdrawn from her engagement in the Audley End Stakes and then sustained her first defeat since the spring when she was beaten by Berkeley Craven's four-year-old Dimity in a ten furlong match.

=== 1812: four-year-old season ===
In 1812, Sorcery again began her season at the Craven meeting. Her owner received a forfeit when Mr Mellish's colt Beverley did not appear for a match against the filly on 31 March. On the following day Sorcery ran a division of the Oatlands Stakes over the two mile "Ditch-In" course. She started 2/1 favourite and ran a dead heat with Beverley, to whom she was conceding nine pounds, before beating the colt in a deciding heat. At the Second Spring meeting a month later, Sorcery finished second in a ten furlong sweepstakes in which was carrying fourteen pounds more than the winner, a colt named Rainbow. On 14 May, Sorcery returned to the scene of her classic success to contest the Epsom Gold Cup, a weight-for-age race which later became the Coronation Cup. She started at odds of 1/3 and won from Lord Lowther's filly Vanity.

At the Newmarket First October meeting, which actually began in September, Sorcery made her first appearance of the autumn in the Trial Stakes, a weight-for-age race over the Ditch Mile. She started the 4/5 favourite and won from Mr Shakespear's horse Chester and seven others. Later that afternoon, she won a further 70 guineas when Leon Forte was withdrawn by his owner from a match race. On 12 October, the Duke of Rutland again "received forfeit": on this occasion, Sir John Shelley withdrew his Derby winner Phantom from a match in which he had been set to concede seven pounds to Sorcery. On the following day, Sorcery finished fourth in a division of the Oatlands Stakes in which she carried top weight of 126 pounds. At the Houghton meeting, the last of the season at Newmarket, Sorcery finished last of the three runners behind Offa's Dyke in a sweepstakes over the Abington Mile, but returned later in the week to win a more valuable event over the same course, beating Lord George Cavendish's Bethlem Gaber and the 1811 St Leger winner Soothsayer.

=== 1813–1814: later racing career ===
Sorcery raced for another two seasons, showing some good form without reproducing her earlier success. In 1813 she finished second under top weight of 123 pounds in a class of the Oatlands Stakes at the Craven meeting and finished runner-up to Defiance in a King's Plate at Newmarket in May. Later that month she recorded her only win of the season when successfully conceding six pounds to Lord Jersey's Asmodeus in a 200 guinea match over the Ditch Mile. In summer she finished second to the 1812 Derby winner Octavius in the Epsom Gold Cup and third under a weight of 126 pounds in the six furlong Wokingham Stakes at Ascot. She finished unplaced in a ten furlong handicap at the Newmarket July meeting and did not race again that year.

Sorcery returned on 12 April 1814 at Newmarket in the Craven Stakes, a weight-for-age stakes over ten furlongs which attracted a field of nineteen runners. She finished second to the five-year-old Slender Billy, with the 1812 2000 Guineas winner Cwrw among the unplaced runners. On 25 April at the First Spring meeting, Sorcery ran twice in one day. She was beaten by Truffle in a 200 Guinea match over the Rowley Mile and then defeated five opponents in a King's Plate over the last three miles of the Beacon Course. At the Second Spring meeting was beaten when attempting to concede three pounds to Mr Shakespear's horse Merrygoround in a match over the Abington Mile. Sorcery's final race took place at Newmarket on 12 July when she finished unplaced in a £50 handicap over the Ditch-In course.

== Stud record ==
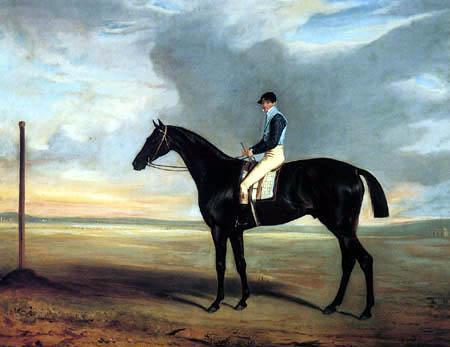
Cadland, Sorcery's 1825 foal

Sorcery was retired from racing to become broodmare. In seventeen years at stud, she produced only six foals which lived to maturity. Her second foal was Emmeline, a filly sired by Waxy who won the Riddlesworth Stakes in 1820.

In 1825, she produced a brown colt foal by the obscure stallion Andrew, who at the time was standing at a stud fee of 1 guinea. Originally known as the Sorcery Colt, he was later named Cadland and won the 2000 Guineas, Derby and fifteen other races. Sorcery produced only one live foal, a colt which "died a few days old" between 1826 and 1832.

== Pedigree ==
Pedigree of Sorcery (GB), bay mare, 1808
Sire Sorcerer (GB) 1796	Trumpator; 1782	Conductor	Matchem
Sire Sorcerer (GB) 1796	Trumpator; 1782	Conductor	Snap Mare
Sire Sorcerer (GB) 1796	Trumpator; 1782	Brunette	Squirrel
Sire Sorcerer (GB) 1796	Trumpator; 1782	Brunette	Dove
Sire Sorcerer (GB) 1796	Young Giantess; 1790	Diomed	Florizel
Sire Sorcerer (GB) 1796	Young Giantess; 1790	Diomed	Sister to Juno
Sire Sorcerer (GB) 1796	Young Giantess; 1790	Giantess	Matchem
Sire Sorcerer (GB) 1796	Young Giantess; 1790	Giantess	Molly Longlegs
Dam Cobbea (GB) 1802	Skyscraper; 1786	Highflyer	Herod
Dam Cobbea (GB) 1802	Skyscraper; 1786	Highflyer	Rachel
Dam Cobbea (GB) 1802	Skyscraper; 1786	Everlasting	Eclipse
Dam Cobbea (GB) 1802	Skyscraper; 1786	Everlasting	Hyaena
Dam Cobbea (GB) 1802	Woodpecker mare 1788	Woodpecker	Herod
Dam Cobbea (GB) 1802	Woodpecker mare 1788	Woodpecker	Miss Ramsden
Dam Cobbea (GB) 1802	Woodpecker mare 1788	Heinel	Squirrel
Dam Cobbea (GB) 1802	Woodpecker mare 1788	Heinel	Principessa (Family 12-a)
