= Morel (horse) =

British Thoroughbred racehorse

- Sire: Sorcerer
- Grandsire: Trumpator
- Dam: Hornby Lass
- Damsire: Buzzard
- Sex: Mare
- Foaled: 1805
- Country: United Kingdom of Great Britain and Ireland
- Colour: Chestnut
- Breeder: Augustus FitzRoy, 3rd Duke of Grafton
- Owner: 3rd Duke of Grafton; Robert Andrew
- Trainer: Robert Robson
- Record: 27: 14-9-1

Major wins
- Newmarket Stakes (1808); Oaks Stakes (1808); July Three-year-old Stakes (1808); Match against Bustard (1808); Match against Beau Nash (1809); Match against Clinker (1809); October Trial Stakes (1809); Match against Nuncio (1810); Match against Erebus (1810); October Oatlands Stakes (1810); Jade Stakes (1810); Match against Asmodeus (1811)

Morel (1805 – after 1830) was a British Thoroughbred racehorse and broodmare who won the classic Oaks Stakes at Epsom Downs Racecourse in 1808. In a racing career which lasted from April 1808 until July 1812 the mare ran twenty-seven times and won fourteen races. She was mainly campaigned at Newmarket Racecourse, running against some of the best horses of the era in match races and frequently carrying large weights in handicaps. Unlike many champions of the early 19th century, she was particularly effective at shorter distances, recording many of her successes over a mile or less. After her retirement from racing, Morel became a highly successful and influential broodmare, whose direct descendants have won numerous major races in Europe, North America, Japan and Australasia.

== Background ==
Morel was a chestnut mare officially bred by her owner Augustus FitzRoy, 3rd Duke of Grafton (1735–1811), the former Prime Minister of Great Britain at his stud at Euston Hall in Suffolk. By the time Morel was foaled in 1805, much of the running of the Duke's breeding and racing operations had been taken over by his sons George (who succeeded him as 4th Duke) and Henry (1770–1828). She was the second foal of her dam, Hornby Lass who later produced the successful racehorse and stallion Truffle and was a sister of Woodbine, the dam of the Oaks winners Music and Minuet. Her sire, Sorcerer, was bred by Sir Charles Bunbury and was a half-brother of the 1801 Derby winning mare Eleanor. Sorcerer was an unusually large black horse who won several important races and became a successful breeding stallion. His progeny included the Derby winner Smolensko, the St Leger winner Soothsayer, the 2000 Guineas winners Wizard and Trophonius, and the Oaks winners Maid of Orleans and Sorcery. Sorcerer was the Leading sire in Great Britain and Ireland in 1811, 1812 and 1813.

Grafton sent the filly to be trained at Newmarket by Robert Robson, the so-called "Emperor of Trainers". She was ridden in most of her races by Bill Clift.

== Racing career ==
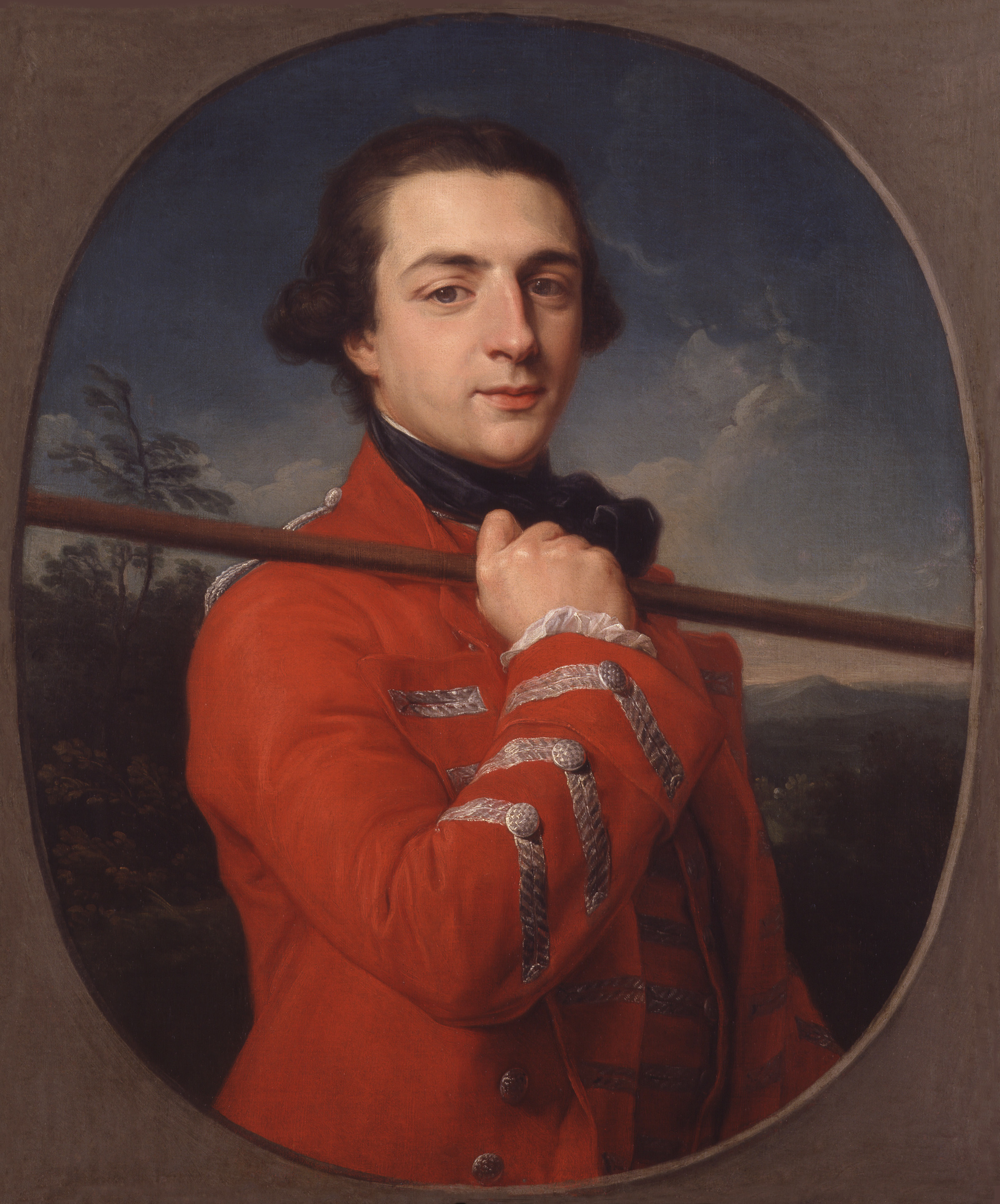
The Duke of Grafton, who bred and owned Morel

=== 1808: three-year-old season ===
Morel began her racing career on 18 April 1808, the opening day of the Craven meeting at Newmarket Racecourse. The only filly in the field of five runners for a Sweepstakes over the Ditch Mile course, Morel started at odds of 5/2 and finished second to Lord Grosvenor's colt Chester. Over the same course and distance two weeks later, Morel and Chester met again in the Newmarket Stakes. Morel reversed the earlier form to record her first victory, winning "very easy" from Chester with Sunbeam third, taking a prize of 800 guineas.

On Friday, June 3, Morel was one of ten fillies, from an original entry of thirty-one, to contest the Oaks Stakes over one and a half miles at Epsom for a purse of 1550 guineas. Ridden by Bill Clift, she was made the 3/1 favourite ahead of Miranda and Goosander who both started at odds of 5/1. Morel took the lead on the turn into the straight and won by one and a half lengths from Goosander, with Miranda in third place. At the Newmarket July meeting Morel defeated Chester again, conceding a pound to the colt who had finished third in The Derby in the July Three-year-old Stakes over ten furlongs. On the following day, Morel contested her first match race and won a 100 guinea purse when beating Lord Stawell's brother to Sir David "in a canter" over the Abington Mile.

Morel returned after a break of almost three months for the autumn meetings at Newmarket, where she had three engagements. On 4 October the Duke received 25 guineas without having to race his filly when her opponent, Mr Gundy, was withdrawn from a five furlong match. Thirteen days later, Morel defeated the seven-year-old horse Bustard in a ten furlong match to win a further 200 guineas. Later that week, Morel started 5/4 favourite for the second class of the Oatlands Stakes, a handicap over the Rowley Mile. Carrying a weight of 109 pounds, she finished second of the six runners to Mr Shakespear's seven-year-old Sir David.

=== 1809: four-year-old season ===
Morel won four of her six races in 1809, all of which took place at Newmarket. At the Craven meeting she successfully conceded ten pounds to Mr Craven's colt Beau Nash in a 200 guinea match over the Abington Mile. Two weeks later she was matched against the 1804 Oaks winner Pelisse in a two-mile match race at level weights. Morel started the 5/11 favourite but was defeated by her older rival, sustaining her first defeat against a female horse. At the next meeting on 1 May defeated the colt Clinker at level weights in a 200 guinea match over the Abington Mile.

Four months after her last run, Morel contested the October Trial Stakes, a weight-for-age race over the Ditch Mile course. She started the 5/6 favourite and "won easy" from seven opponents including the 1809 Oaks winner Maid of Orleans. Later that week she was beaten by Sir David in a five furlong match. On 19 October, Morel made her final appearance of the year in a handicap Sweepstakes over the Ditch Mile. Carrying top weight of 126 pounds, she started 4/5 favourite and won "very easy" from Sir Charles Bunbury's filly Agnes and four others.

=== 1810: five-year-old season ===
In a repeat of her 1809 campaign, Morel raced exclusively at Newmarket and won four of her six races. At the Craven meeting her owner "received forfeit" when Lord Lowther's Agnes failed to appear for a 200 guinea match race over the two mile match against his filly. On the following afternoon, over the same course and distance, Morel successfully conceded fourteen pounds to Mr Shakespear's colt Nuncio, winning a prize of 100 guineas. In May, Morel won another 100 guineas when conceding 24 pounds to the three-year-old colt Erebus over five furlongs.

On 1 October, Morel attempted to repeat her previous year's success in the Trial Stakes, but finished second of the seven runners behind Lord Jersey's horse Langton. Sixteen days later, Morel carried top weight of 136 pounds in the October Oatlands Stakes over the Bunbury Mile. She started second favourite at odds of 5/2 and won from Lord Jersey's Anthonio and four others. At the Houghton meeting, Morel contested the Jade Stakes, a sprint handicap in which she was assigned top weight of 133 pounds. She started the 4/5 favourite and won from Sir Charles Bunbury's colt Fair Star. In the Audley End Stakes three days later, Morel, carrying 139 pounds, finished unplaced for the first time in her racing career. The winner of the race, Queen of Sheba, carried 86 pounds.

=== 1811–1812: later career ===
Following the death of the Duke of Grafton in March 1811, Morel was offered for sale and was bought for 620 guineas by Robert Andrew. She competed for a further two seasons, but failed to reproduce her earlier success, winning one of her eight races at Newmarket.

In 1811 she was beaten in matches against Mr Howorth's Invalid, her old rival Chester, and Sir John Shelley's Derby winner Phantom as well as finishing unpaced in the October Oatlands Stakes. Her only win of the season came on 14 October when she successfully conceded ten pounds to Lord Bentinck's four-year-old Asmodeus.

In 1812, Morel finished last of the three runners in the Chippenham Stakes, was beaten in a match in which she attempted to concede six pounds to the Derby winner Pan over the Abington Mile and ended her career by running fourth in a handicap at the July meeting.

== Stud record ==
Morel was retired from racing to become a broodmare. At stud she had an enduring influence on the Thoroughbred breed, being the Foundation mare of Thoroughbred Family 1-b. In 1816 Morel produced a colt by Orville named Andrew, who made no impact as a racehorse but sired the Derby winner Cadland. In 1823, Morel produced a filly named Mangel-Wurzel, sired by the stallion Merlin. Mangel-Wurzel was the direct female ancestor of many notable Thoroughbreds including the Ascot Gold Cup winner Mortemer and the 1979 Epsom Derby winner Troy.

Morel's 1824 foal Mustard, also by Merlin, had a long-lasting influence on the breed, being regarded as the Foundation mare of Thoroughbred Family 1-c. She was the dam of the St Leger winner Mango and Preserve who won the 1000 Guineas. Through Preserve, Morel is the direct female ancestor of the classic winners Spearmint, Brownhylda (Oaks) and Firdaussi (St Leger). North American bred descendants of Preserve include Awesome Again, High Quest, Arts and Letters, Grindstone, Pass Catcher, Silverbulletday and the Melbourne Cup winner At Talaq.

In 1826, Morel produced a filly by Sam who never raced, but became an important broodmare. She was the direct ancestor of the 2000 Guineas winner Conyngham, the outstanding American stayer and sire Princequillo and the Melbourne Cup winners Gatum Gatum and Comic Court.

In 1827, she gave birth to her last foal, a colt by Sam, and was then barren for three consecutive seasons. On 15 November 1830, Morel was sold at auction at Tattersall's for 11 guineas. She did not produce a foal in 1831 and there is no mention of her in subsequent editions of the stud book.

== Pedigree ==
Pedigree of Morel (GB), chestnut mare, 1805
Sire Sorcerer (GB) 1796	Trumpator; 1782	Conductor	Matchem*
Sire Sorcerer (GB) 1796	Trumpator; 1782	Conductor	Snap Mare
Sire Sorcerer (GB) 1796	Trumpator; 1782	Brunette	Squirrel
Sire Sorcerer (GB) 1796	Trumpator; 1782	Brunette	Dove
Sire Sorcerer (GB) 1796	Young Giantess; 1790	Diomed	Florizel*^
Sire Sorcerer (GB) 1796	Young Giantess; 1790	Diomed	Sister to Juno
Sire Sorcerer (GB) 1796	Young Giantess; 1790	Giantess	Matchem*
Sire Sorcerer (GB) 1796	Young Giantess; 1790	Giantess	Molly Longlegs
Dam Hornby Lass (GB) 1796	Buzzard; 1787	Woodpecker	Herod*^
Dam Hornby Lass (GB) 1796	Buzzard; 1787	Woodpecker	Miss Ramsden
Dam Hornby Lass (GB) 1796	Buzzard; 1787	Misfortune	Dux
Dam Hornby Lass (GB) 1796	Buzzard; 1787	Misfortune	Curiosity
Dam Hornby Lass (GB) 1796	Puzzle; 1778	Matchem*	Cade
Dam Hornby Lass (GB) 1796	Puzzle; 1778	Matchem*	sister 2 to Miss Partner
Dam Hornby Lass (GB) 1796	Puzzle; 1778	Princess	Herod*^
Dam Hornby Lass (GB) 1796	Puzzle; 1778	Princess	Julia

* Morel is inbred 4S x 4S x 3D to the stallion Matchem, meaning that he appears fourth generation twice on the sire side of her pedigree and third generation once on the dam side of her pedigree.

*^ Morel is inbred 5S x 4D x 4D to the stallion Herod, meaning that he appears fifth generation once (via Florizel)^ on the sire side of her pedigree and fourth generation twice on the dam side of her pedigree.
