= Tiresias (horse) =

British Thoroughbred racehorse

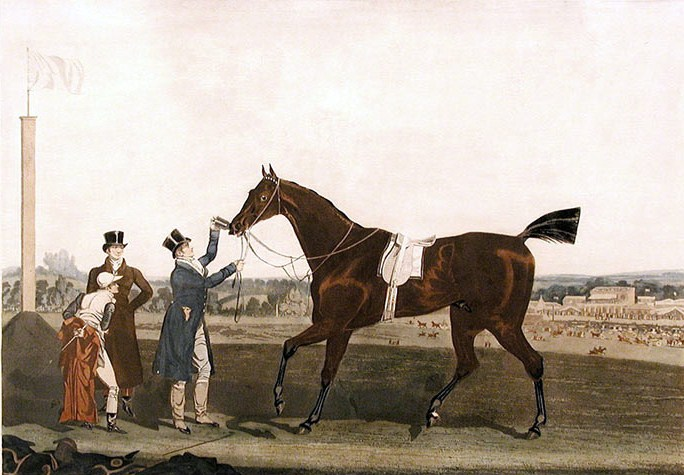
- Tiresias with jockey and trainer. Engraving by James Pollard.
- Sire: Soothsayer
- Grandsire: Sorcerer
- Dam: Pledge
- Damsire: Waxy
- Sex: Stallion
- Foaled: 1816
- Country: United Kingdom of Great Britain and Ireland
- Colour: Brown
- Breeder: William Bentinck, 4th Duke of Portland
- Owner: Duke of Portland
- Record: 13:11-2-0

Major wins
- Newmarket Stakes (1819); Epsom Derby (1819); Newmarket St Leger (1819); Audley End Stakes (1819)

Tiresias (1816–1837) was a British Thoroughbred racehorse and sire. In a career that lasted from April 1819 to July 1820 he ran thirteen times, all but two of them at Newmarket and won eleven races. Both of his defeats came when he was attempting to concede weight to opponents in match races. His most important win came in May 1819 when he won the Derby. Tiresias's racing career was ended by injury in the summer of 1820, after which he was retired to stud.

== Background ==
Tiresias was a brown horse standing 16 hands high bred by his owner William Bentinck, 4th Duke of Portland a leading member of the Jockey Club who owned much of the land around Newmarket Racecourse. Nicknamed "The Farmer Duke", Portland bred horses at his stately home at Welbeck Abbey in Nottinghamshire. Tiresias was sired by Soothsayer, who won the St Leger in 1811 and went on to be a successful stud horse, being the Leading sire in Great Britain and Ireland in 1819. Apart from Tiresias, his most notable winner was the 2000 Guineas winner Interpreter. He was eventually sold and exported to Russia.

Tiresias was trained at Newmarket by the Duke's private trainer Richard Prince and ridden in most of his important races by the veteran jockey Bill Clift, whose strong but unsophisticated style was particularly effective on front-running horses.

== Racing career ==
=== 1819: three-year-old season ===
Tiresias was unraced as a two-year-old and began his racing career by winning five prizes in eighteen days at Newmarket in the spring of 1819. On 12 April, the opening day of the Craven meeting, Tiresias started at odds of 1/3 for a 200 guinea Sweepstakes over one mile and defeated his only rival, the Duke of Grafton's Vanguard. Three days later, his owner was able to claim a further 100 guineas without having to run his horse, when Tiresias was allowed to walk over in another Sweepstakes. Tiresias added a further 100 guineas to his earnings the following day when his opponent in a scheduled match race failed to appear.

At the next meeting, Tiresias ran in the Newmarket Stakes on 30 April, in which his ten opponents included Antar, who had won the 2000 Guineas earlier in the week. He started the 4/6 favourite and won from an unnamed colt by Selim, with Antar unplaced. On the following day Tiresias started at odds of 1/3 and beat two opponents in the Palace Stakes over a mile. The performances of Tiresias led to his being made favourite for the Derby, but doubts arose after he was decisively beaten in a "private" trial by his stable companion, Snake. It was later pointed out that Tiresias, known to be an extremely difficult horse to ride, had been ridden in the trial by an inexperienced stable lad, who had been unable to control the colt effectively.

On 27 May at Epsom, Tiresias started the 5/2 favourite in a field of sixteen runners for the Derby ahead of Sultan on 3/1. The race was considered exceptionally strong and there was heavy betting on the two leading contenders. Ridden by the experienced Bill Clift, he took the lead from the start and held on in the straight to win by a neck from Sultan. While some reports maintain that he beat Sultan "with difficulty", others claim that his victory was relatively easy. After completing the course Tiresias overcame Clift's restraint and galloped almost to the centre of Epsom town before he could be brought under control.

After a four-month break, Tiresias returned for the three autumn meetings at Newmarket, where he was entered in five races. On 6 October he won the Newmarket St Leger, beating Banker, Sir Topaz and five others. The following day he was allowed to walk over for a Subscription Plate when none of the nineteen other entries appeared to oppose him. Tiresias was withdrawn from his engagement in the Oatlands Stakes on 22 October at a meeting disrupted by snow. Tiresias's winning run came to an end on the opening day of the Houghton meeting on 1 November. He was beaten in a one mile match race by Mr Vansittart's grey colt Financier, to whom he was attempting to concede three pounds. Tiresias ended his season with a win four days later when he beat the four-year-old Dictator in the Audley End Stakes.

=== 1821: four-year-old season ===
Tiresias began his four-year-old campaign with a match race against Merlin at Newmarket on 6 April. He took the 300 guinea prize without effort as his opponent broke down injured a quarter of a mile from the finish. At the next Newmarket meeting two weeks later he claimed another 300 guinea prize, recording a "very easy" win over Pacha in a one mile match. Three days later he was beaten into second place when attempting to concede eight pounds to Banker in a Sweepstakes. On 4 May at Newmarket, Tiresias won the Jockey Club Purse over the four mile Beacon Course, easily beating Aldford at level weights.

On 4 July, Tiresias traveled away from Newmarket for only the second time in his career when he contested the two mile King's Purse at Ipswich. The race was run in a series of heats, the prize going to the first horse to win two of these. Tiresias settled the race by winning the first two heats, beating his three-year-old opponents. A week later, on his final appearance, Tiresias walked over for a £50 prize at Newmarket's July meeting. He was injured shortly afterwards and retired from racing.

== Stud career ==
Tiresias was retired to his owner's stud at Norton, near Ollerton in Nottinghamshire. His initial stud fee was 10 guineas with half a guinea for the groom. He was not considered a success as a stallion, with his offspring being described as "big and good looking, but very uncertain customers", suggesting that he transmitted a good deal of his difficult temperament. His name did not appear in the List of Stallions advertised in the Racing Calendar after 1831, suggesting that he had been withdrawn from stud duties. Tiresias died at his owner's estate at Welbeck Abbey on 4 November 1837.

== Pedigree ==
Pedigree of Tiresias (GB), brown stallion, 1816
| Sire Soothsayer (GB) 1808 | Sorcerer; 1796 | Trumpator | Conductor |
| Sire Soothsayer (GB) 1808 | Sorcerer; 1796 | Trumpator | Brunette |
| Sire Soothsayer (GB) 1808 | Sorcerer; 1796 | Young Giantess | Diomed |
| Sire Soothsayer (GB) 1808 | Sorcerer; 1796 | Young Giantess | Giantess |
| Sire Soothsayer (GB) 1808 | Golden Locks; 1793 | Delpini | Highflyer* |
| Sire Soothsayer (GB) 1808 | Golden Locks; 1793 | Delpini | Countess |
| Sire Soothsayer (GB) 1808 | Golden Locks; 1793 | Violet | Shark |
| Sire Soothsayer (GB) 1808 | Golden Locks; 1793 | Violet | Syphon mare |
| Dam Pledge (GB) 1807 | Waxy; 1790 | Potoooooooo | Eclipse |
| Dam Pledge (GB) 1807 | Waxy; 1790 | Potoooooooo | Sportsmistress |
| Dam Pledge (GB) 1807 | Waxy; 1790 | Maria | Herod* |
| Dam Pledge (GB) 1807 | Waxy; 1790 | Maria | Lisette |
| Dam Pledge (GB) 1807 | Prunella; 1788 | Highflyer* | Herod* |
| Dam Pledge (GB) 1807 | Prunella; 1788 | Highflyer* | Rachel |
| Dam Pledge (GB) 1807 | Prunella; 1788 | Promise | Snap |
| Dam Pledge (GB) 1807 | Prunella; 1788 | Promise | Julia (Family:1-e) |

* Tiresias is inbred 4S × 3D to the stallion Highflyer, meaning that he appears fourth generation on the sire side of his pedigree and third generation on the dam side of his pedigree.

* Tiresias is inbred 5S x 4D x 4D to the stallion Herod, meaning that he appears once fifth generation on the sire side of his pedigree and twice fourth generation on the dam side of his pedigree.
