= Sorcerer (horse) =

British Thoroughbred racehorse

- Sire: Trumpator
- Grandsire: Conductor
- Dam: Young Giantess
- Damsire: Diomed
- Sex: Stallion
- Foaled: 1796
- Country: Great Britain
- Colour: Black
- Breeder: Sir Charles Bunbury
- Owner: Sir Charles Bunbury
- Record: 21: 15-5-1
- Earnings: 1938 gs

Major wins
- Match against Chippenham (1800); Match against Speculator (1800); Ipswich King's Plate (1800) £50 Subscription at Newmarket (1800); October Oatlands Stakes (1800); Match against Richmond (1801, twice); Burford King's Plate (1801)

Awards
- Leading sire in Great Britain and Ireland (1811, 1812, 1813)

Sorcerer (1796–1821) was a British Thoroughbred racehorse. He ran mainly at Newmarket and won fifteen of his twenty-one races, including the October Oatlands Stakes in 1800. After retiring from racing he became a successful stallion and was the leading sire in Great Britain and Ireland for three years. Amongst his progeny were Morel, Maid of Orleans, Wizard, Soothsayer, Sorcery, Trophonius, Comus and Smolensko. He was bred and owned by Sir Charles Bunbury and died in 1821.

== Background ==
Sorcerer was a black colt bred by Sir Charles Bunbury and foaled in 1796. He grew to stand 16 hands 1 inch high. He was sired by Trumpator, who raced mainly at Newmarket and won the Claret Stakes in 1786. Trumpator also became a successful stallion and was British Champion sire in 1803. He also sired Epsom Derby winner Didelot and the broodmares Pawn and Penelope. Sorcerer was the first foal of Young Giantess, a daughter of Diomed, who also went on to produce Eleanor, Julia, Cressida and the Walton mare.

== Racing career ==
=== 1799: Three-year-old season ===
Sorcerer made his debut at the Newmarket Second October meeting. He started a Sweepstakes of 200 guineas each for three-year-olds as the 2/1 favourite. In the two and a quarter mile race he finished second to Sir F. Standish's brother to Spread Eagle. Kite finished the race in third place and Rebel fourth. At the end of the month he beat Lord Clermont's Royala in a match race over five and a half furlongs at Newmarket.

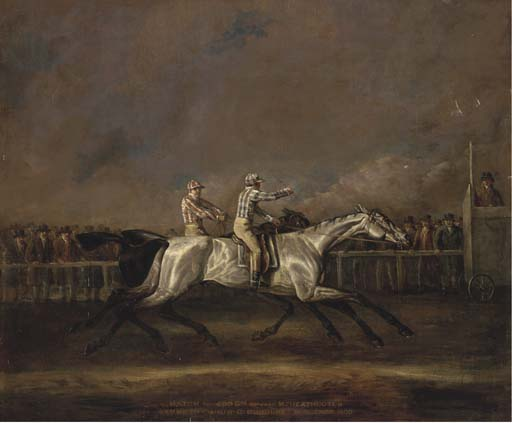
The match race between Symmetry (foreground) and Sorcerer at Newmarket

=== 1800: Four-year-old season ===
On 28 April 1800 at Newmarket, Sorcerer lost a match race to Schedoni. Three days later he faced Chippenham in a match race over the Rowley Mile. Chippenham started as the 2/7 favourite, but Sorcerer won the 100 guineas race. In mid-May he beat Speculator in a one-mile race, again racing at Newmarket. Racing away from Newmarket for the first time, he won the King's Plate at Ipswich in July. The race was run in two two-mile heats, with Sorcerer winning both heats, beating a Pot-8-Os colt and Skyrocket. He returned to Newmarket for the July meeting, where he beat Cadet, Skyrocket and Gouty in the £50 race over two miles. After a few months off he returned to the track in October, when he lost a match race against Symmetry at Newmarket. Later in the day he finished third behind winner Humbug in a 50 guineas race over the four-mile Beacon course. Two days later he finished as the runner-up to Worthy in the King's Plate, a race run over almost four miles. At Newmarket's Second October meeting he beat Surprise over two miles. He then contested the October Oatlands Stakes. Sorcerer started the one-mile race as the 11/5 favourite, with Georgiana at 4/1, Humbug at 5/1 and First Fruits at 7/1 also near the fore of the betting. Sorcerer won the race from Scrub, who finished second, with the other seven runners not being placed by the judge.

=== 1801: Five-year-old season ===
Sorcerer returned to the track again in April 1801 at the Newmarket Craven meeting. He won a Subscription plate of £50, beating three rivals after starting as the odds-on favourite. He them collected a 50 guinea forfeit from Richmond, whom he was due to race at the First Spring meeting. At the same meeting he beat Sir Harry and Ploughboy to win a £50 Subscription, run over almost four miles. Two days later he faced Worthy and a Sir Peter colt in the King's Plate over 3 miles, 6 1/2 furlongs. Worthy and Sorcerer finished in a dead heat and the race had to be decided in a run-off, which was won by Worthy. A further two days later, on the last day of the meeting, Sorcerer beat Richmond in a two-mile match race. The two horses met again in July, this time over four miles, with Sorcerer again coming out on top. The following day Sorcerer walked over for a £50 race over the two-mile Ditch-in course. At Oxford he beat Cordovan in both of the two three-mile heats to win £50 given by the Duke of Marlborough. On 29 July he walked over for King's Plate at Burford. His final race came on 15 August, when he beat Rebel for a Subscription of 10 guineas each over four miles at Lewes. He was then retired to stud.

== Stud career ==
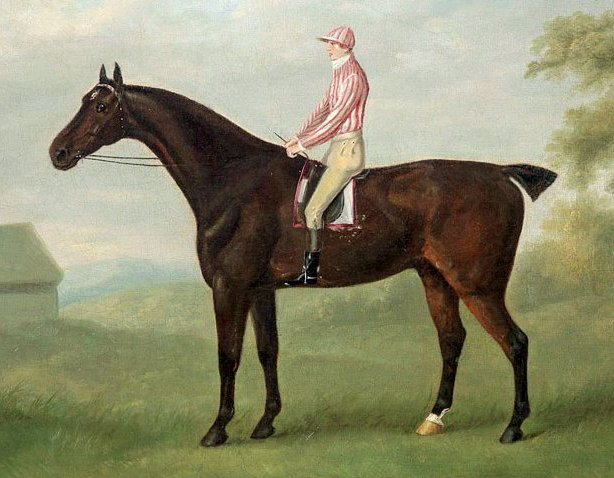
Sorcerer's son Smolensko

Sorcerer stood as a stallion at Great Barton in Suffolk. In 1805 his stud fee was ten guineas and half a guinea for the groom. He was the leading sire in Great Britain and Ireland in 1811, 1812 and 1813. His most notable progeny were:

- Morel (1805) – won a number of races, including the Oaks Stakes in 1808.
- Maid of Orleans (1806) – won the Oaks in 1809.
- Wizard (1806) – won the 2000 Guineas and finished second in the 1809 Derby. He later beat Derby winner Pope in a match race in 1810.
- Gramarie (1807) – was the dam of Derby winner Prince Leopold.
- Soothsayer (1808) – won the St. Leger Stakes and Doncaster Stakes in 1811 and later beat Derby winner Phantom in 1813. He later became a Champion sire, producing 2000 Guineas winner Interpreter and Derby winner Tiresias along with many good broodmares.
- Sorcery (1808) – won the Oaks and foaled Derby winner Cadland.
- Trophonius (1808) – won the 2000 Guineas in 1811.
- Truffle (1808) – won many races at Newmarket and sired Abjer and Ascot Gold Cup winner Champignon.
- Comus (1809) – won the Claret Stakes. He sired 2000 Guineas winner Grey Momus and St. Leger winners Reveller and Matilda.
- Smolensko (1810) – won the 2000 Guineas, the Derby and the Newmarket Stakes. After retiring from racing he sired Oaks winner Gulnare and St. Leger winner Jerry.
- Sorcerer mare (1810) – was the dam of St. Leger winner Jack Spigot.

Sorcerer died in 1821, aged 25.

== Sire line tree ==
- Sorcerer
  - Thunderbolt
    - Hymettus
  - Wizard
    - Warlock
    - Young Wizard
  - Soothsayer
    - Interpreter
    - Welbeck
      - Bedlamite
    - Tiresias
      - Bud
  - Trophonius
  - Truffle
    - Champignon
    - Abjer
  - Comus
    - Reveller
    - The Juggler
    - Humphrey Clinker
      - Rockingham
      - Bran
      - Melbourne
        - Sir Tatton Sykes
        - West Australian
        - The Peer
          - Darebin
            - The Australian Peer
        - Young Melbourne
          - General Peel
          - Statesman
        - Emigrant
    - Trinculo
    - Grey Momus
      - Seal
  - Smolensko
    - Jerry
      - Tomboy
        - Nutwith
        - Trueboy
      - Clearwell
      - Jeremy Diddler
      - Jericho
        - The Promised Land
  - Bourbon
    - Toss
  - Clavileno
    - Captain Absolute

== Pedigree ==
Pedigree of Sorcerer, black stallion, 1796
Sire Trumpator (GB) bl. 1782	Conductor (GB) ch. 1767	Matchem* b. 1748	Cade*
Sire Trumpator (GB) bl. 1782	Conductor (GB) ch. 1767	Matchem* b. 1748	Partner mare*
Sire Trumpator (GB) bl. 1782	Conductor (GB) ch. 1767	Snap mare 1762	Snap
Sire Trumpator (GB) bl. 1782	Conductor (GB) ch. 1767	Snap mare 1762	Cullen Arabian mare
Sire Trumpator (GB) bl. 1782	Brunette (GB) br. 1771	Squirrel b. 1754	Traveller
Sire Trumpator (GB) bl. 1782	Brunette (GB) br. 1771	Squirrel b. 1754	Grey Bloody Buttocks
Sire Trumpator (GB) bl. 1782	Brunette (GB) br. 1771	Dove; 1764	Matchless
Sire Trumpator (GB) bl. 1782	Brunette (GB) br. 1771	Dove; 1764	Ancaster Starling mare
Dam Young Giantess (GB) b. 1790	Diomed (GB) ch. 1777	Florizel b. 1768	Herod
Dam Young Giantess (GB) b. 1790	Diomed (GB) ch. 1777	Florizel b. 1768	Cygnet mare
Dam Young Giantess (GB) b. 1790	Diomed (GB) ch. 1777	Spectator mare 1763	Spectator
Dam Young Giantess (GB) b. 1790	Diomed (GB) ch. 1777	Spectator mare 1763	Blank mare
Dam Young Giantess (GB) b. 1790	Giantess (GB) b. 1769	Matchem* b. 1748	Cade*
Dam Young Giantess (GB) b. 1790	Giantess (GB) b. 1769	Matchem* b. 1748	Partner mare*
Dam Young Giantess (GB) b. 1790	Giantess (GB) b. 1769	Molly Long Legs; 1753	Babraham
Dam Young Giantess (GB) b. 1790	Giantess (GB) b. 1769	Molly Long Legs; 1753	Cole's Foxhunter mare

Note: b. = Bay, bl. = Black, br. = Brown, ch. = Chestnut

* Sorcerer is inbred 3S × 3D to the stallion Matchem, meaning that he appears third generation on the sire side of his pedigree and third generation on the dam side of his pedigree.
