= Maid of Orleans (horse) =

British-bred Thoroughbred racehorse

- Sire: Sorcerer
- Grandsire: Trumpator
- Dam: Potoooooooo mare
- Damsire: Potoooooooo
- Sex: Mare
- Foaled: 1806
- Country: United Kingdom of Great Britain and Ireland
- Colour: Bay
- Breeder: John Leveson Gower
- Owner: John Leveson Gower; Stanlake Batson
- Trainer: Robert Robson
- Record: 9: 3-1-2

Major wins
- Oaks Stakes (1809); Match against Chryseis (1810)

Maid of Orleans (1806–1825) was a British Thoroughbred racehorse and broodmare who won the classic Oaks Stakes at Epsom Downs Racecourse in 1809. Unraced as a two-year-old, Maid of Orleans won her first race at Newmarket in April 1809 and then won the Oaks as a 16/1 outsider, beating her more fancied stable companion. The filly won only one of her remaining seven races, and was retired from racing at the end of 1810.

== Background ==
Maid of Orleans was a bay mare bred by General John Leveson Gower, in whose pink and black colours she raced in 1809. She was the fourth foal of her dam, an unnamed mare by Potoooooooo who was a full sister of both The Derby and St Leger Stakes winner Champion and to Lady Sophia, dam of the 1000 Guineas winner Charlotte and grand-dam of the Derby winner Mameluke. The "Sister to Champion" (as the Potoooooooo mare is sometimes known) also produced Advance, whose daughter Galata won the 1000 Guineas, Oaks and Ascot Gold Cup.

Her sire, Sorcerer, was bred by Sir Charles Bunbury and was a half-brother of the 1801 Derby winning mare Eleanor. Sorcerer was an unusually large black horse who won several important races and became a successful breeding stallion. His progeny included the Derby winner Smolensko, the 2000 Guineas winners Wizard and Trophonius, and the Oaks winners Morel and Sorcery. Sorcerer was the Leading sire in Great Britain and Ireland in 1811, 1812 and 1813.

Leveson Gower sent the filly to be trained at Newmarket by Robert Robson, the so-called "Emperor of Trainers". She was ridden in most of her races by Ben Moss.

== Racing career ==
=== 1809: three-year-old season ===
Maid of Orleans made her first racecourse appearance on 3 April, the opening day of the Craven meeting at Newmarket Racecourse. She ran in the third race of the afternoon, a Sweepstakes for colts and fillies over the Abington Mile course. In the previous race, General Gower's filly Chryseis had finished in the inaugural running of the contest which would become known as the 2000 Guineas. Maid of Orleans started at odds of 3/1 and won from Puck, a colt owned by Lord Grosvenor after "a fine race".

On 19 May Gower sent both Chryseis and Maid of Orleans to contest the Oaks Stakes over one and a half miles at Epsom. In a field of eleven runners, Chryseis was made 3/1 favourite, whilst Maid of Orleans was relatively unfancied at odds of 100/6 (just over 16/1), in a race which provoked a good deal of betting interest. Maid of Orleans was sent into the lead from the start by Ben Moss, whose "great jockeyship" was praised by the Sporting Magazine, and was never overtaken, winning from Zaida and Spindle with Chryseis fourth.

Following her win at Epsom, Maid of Orleans did not race again until autumn. On 3 October at Newmarket she ran in the October Trial Stakes, a weight-for-age race over the Ditch Mile. She was not among the favourites and finished unplaced behind the 1808 Oaks winner Morel.

=== 1810: four-year-old season ===
Before the start of the 1810 season General Gower sold Maid of Orleans to Stanlake Batson. In her first run for her new owner, the filly finished last of the three runners in the Port Stakes over two miles at Newmarket on 9 May. Although Gower had sold Maid of Orleans, he retained the ownership of Chryseis and the two fillies met in a match at Newmarket on 21 May. Maid of Orleans was set to concede eight pounds in weight to her rival, and was not fancied in the betting, starting at odds of 5/1, but defeated Chryseis "quite easy" over the Abington Mile to claim the 200 guinea prize.

Maid of Orleans never won again. On the day after her match race win, she finished unplaced behind Berkeley Craven's filly Black Diamond in a ten furlong handicap race. In June at Ascot Racecourse she finished third of the five runners behind the Duke of York's Sagana in the Swinley Stakes, and was withdrawn after finishing sixth in the first heat of two mile handicap. Maid of Orleans made her final appearance at Newbury Racecourse on 14 August. She finished second to Mr Weatherill's colt Break in both heats of a £50 race over two miles.

== Stud record ==
Maid of Orleans was retired from racing to become a broodmare for her owner's stud, although she later appears to have changed hands more than once. She was covered by several leading stallions including Gohanna and Orville and produced seven live foals in thirteen years. She was euthanised in 1825.

== Pedigree ==
Pedigree of Maid of Orleans (GB), bay mare, 1806
Sire Sorcerer (GB) 1796	Trumpator; 1782	Conductor	Matchem
Sire Sorcerer (GB) 1796	Trumpator; 1782	Conductor	Snap Mare
Sire Sorcerer (GB) 1796	Trumpator; 1782	Brunette	Squirrel
Sire Sorcerer (GB) 1796	Trumpator; 1782	Brunette	Dove
Sire Sorcerer (GB) 1796	Young Giantess; 1790	Diomed	Florizel
Sire Sorcerer (GB) 1796	Young Giantess; 1790	Diomed	Sister to Juno
Sire Sorcerer (GB) 1796	Young Giantess; 1790	Giantess	Matchem
Sire Sorcerer (GB) 1796	Young Giantess; 1790	Giantess	Molly Longlegs
Dam Potoooooooo mare(GB) 1793	Potoooooooo; 1773	Eclipse	Marske
Dam Potoooooooo mare(GB) 1793	Potoooooooo; 1773	Eclipse	Spilletta
Dam Potoooooooo mare(GB) 1793	Potoooooooo; 1773	Sportsmistress	Sportsman
Dam Potoooooooo mare(GB) 1793	Potoooooooo; 1773	Sportsmistress	Golden Locks
Dam Potoooooooo mare(GB) 1793	Huncamunca; 1787	Highflyer	Herod
Dam Potoooooooo mare(GB) 1793	Huncamunca; 1787	Highflyer	Rachel
Dam Potoooooooo mare(GB) 1793	Huncamunca; 1787	Cypher	Squirrel
Dam Potoooooooo mare(GB) 1793	Huncamunca; 1787	Cypher	Regulus mare
