= Cadland =

British-bred Thoroughbred racehorse

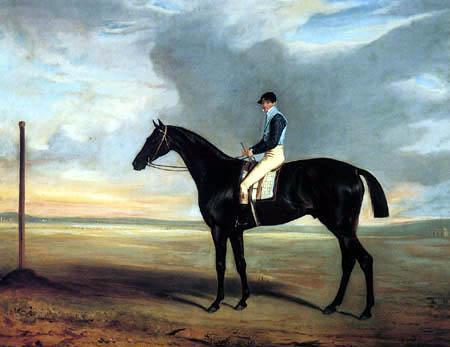
- Cadland and Jem Robinson. Painting by John Ferneley.
- Sire: Andrew
- Grandsire: Orville
- Dam: Sorcery
- Damsire: Sorceror
- Sex: Stallion
- Foaled: 1825
- Country: United Kingdom of Great Britain and Ireland
- Colour: Brown
- Breeder: John Manners, 5th Duke of Rutland
- Owner: 5th Duke of Rutland
- Trainer: R. D. Boyce
- Record: 27:17-4-5

Major wins
- 2000 Guineas (1828); Epsom Derby (1828); Grand Duke Michael Stakes (1828); Newmarket St Leger (1828); Oatlands Stakes (1829); Audley End Stakes (1829); Jockey Club Plate (1830); The Whip (1830)

Cadland (1825–1837) was a British Thoroughbred racehorse and sire. In a career that lasted from April 1828 to 1831 he ran twenty-five times and won fifteen races, with several of his wins being walkovers in which all of his opponents were withdrawn. In the summer of 1828 he ran a dead heat with The Colonel in the Derby, before winning the race in a deciding run-off. He went on to have a long and successful racing career, winning a further eleven races before his retirement, and developing a notable rivalry with his contemporary Zinganee. Cadland was disappointing as a sire of winners in England and was exported to France, where he was much more successful. He died in 1837.

== Background ==
Cadland was a brown horse standing 15.3 hands high bred by his owner the Duke of Rutland. His dam was the Duke's highly successful racemare Sorcery, who won The Oaks in 1811 and several other important races. As a broodmare, however, she had been a disappointment and had been barren for two years before being sent to a cheap and undistinguished stallion named Andrew in 1824. Andrew, a well-bred but not particularly successful racehorse, had attracted little attention as a sire, and was covering at a fee of one guinea when Sorcery was one of only three or four Thoroughbred mares sent to him in the year of Cadland's conception.

== Racing career ==
=== 1828: three-year-old season ===
The colt who would become Cadland was unraced at two and was still unnamed at the start of 1828, being known as "The Sorcery Colt" after his dam. His racing career was scheduled to begin at the Craven meeting at Newmarket in April 1828 with a run in a match race but his opponent, a colt named Segar was withdrawn, allowing his owners to collect the £100 forfeit. At the next Newmarket meeting he ran as "Cadland" for the first time to win a two-runner Produce Stakes on 21 April, running away from his only opponent. He then reappeared the following day for the 2000 Guineas. Racing on soft, muddy ground, he started at odds of 5/1 and won by a head from Lepanto, with the favourite Navarino finishing well beaten. At the same meeting he recorded his first official walkover when the other eight runners in a Sweepstakes were withdrawn by their owners.

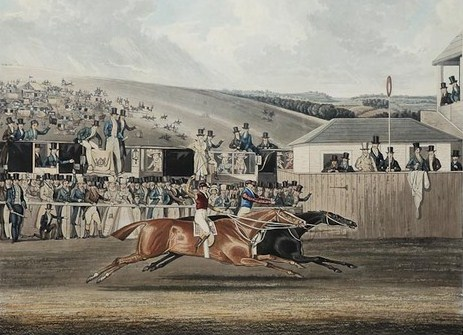
Cadland beats The Colonel in the deciding heat of the 1828 Derby as depicted in an aquatint by James Pollard.

At Epsom on 15 May, Cadland started the 4/1 second favourite for the Derby in a field of fifteen runners. The Colonel, one of the leading two-year-olds of the previous season when he had easily beaten Lepanto, was made favourite at 7/2. The Colonel was trained in Yorkshire by John Scott and ridden by his brother Bill, while Cadland was ridden by his usual jockey James "Jem" Robinson. After two false starts, the race got under way with Robinson immediately sending Cadland into the lead. He set a strong pace and by the turn into the straight at Tattenham Corner, The Colonel, Zinganee, Alcaston and Omen were the only other horses left in contention. In the straight the race became a match between the first and second favourites who ran side by side throughout the final quarter mile. A furlong from the finish The Colonel gained a slight advantage, but Cadland rallied and the two colts crossed the line together. After a short delay the judge declared a dead-heat. According to the rules of the day, such a result required the horses to run again over the same course unless both of the owners agreed to divide the prize money. The Colonel's owner, Mr Petrie, declared that he had no intention of dividing and so the deciding heat took place after the next race. A description of the day in The Sporting Oracle claims the mood was one of "concentrated and absolutely astounding excitement". For the rematch, The Colonel started a slight favourite, with the view being taken that his stamina and "stouter" pedigree would be decisive. Some observers, however, noticed that Bill Scott was "nervous almost to the point of agitation" at the prospect of taking on Robinson, who was known for his excellence in closely run races. Robinson himself, by contrast, appeared calm and collected, pausing for a pinch of snuff before mounting for the rematch. Once again Cadland made the early running before The Colonel moved up to challenge him in the straight. On this occasion, however, the Northern horse was unable to get to the lead and Cadland maintained a narrow advantage throughout the closing stages to win by a margin reported as either a neck or half a length. The Sporting Magazine commented that "Such a Derby was never before seen and possibly never will again", while the racing historian John Orton claimed that "Two finer races were never before seen".

In autumn Cadland was not sent north for the St Leger (which The Colonel won) but raced instead at Newmarket, as he would do for most of his career. On the Monday of the First October meeting he led from the start in the Grand Duke Michael Stakes and won easily by two lengths. Two days later he won the Newmarket St Leger "in a canter", finishing fifty yards clear of the runner-up. Commenting on these successes the Sporting Magazine observed that Cadland, for all his ability, was not a "free pleasing" runner, often seeming reluctant and idle in his races. At the Houghton meeting his owners claimed the forfeit money when Bessy Bedlam, his opponent for a match race, was withdrawn. He ended the season undefeated, with five competitive wins, one walkover, two match forfeits, and almost £6,000 in prize money.

=== 1829: four-year-old season ===
Cadland made his first appearance of the 1829 season in the £200 Claret Stakes on 24 April at Newmarket. He started 4/7 favourite but his unbeaten run came to an end as he finished last of the three runners behind Zinganee, in an upset described by the New Sporting Magazine as "a thunder-bolt". In a very strong field (described by one commentator as "without parallel") for the Ascot Gold Cup on 18 June Cadland finished third to Zinganee and Mameluke, with The Colonel and Green Mantle (Epsom Oaks) among those behind him. The spectators for this race included King George IV who was at that time The Colonel's owner.

At Newmarket in autumn, Cadland was unbeaten in three races. On 1 October, carrying 147 pounds he won a King's Plate, beating his only rival, a colt named Mariner. At the next Newmarket meeting two weeks later he won the Oatlands Stakes, a handicap race, beating six opponents under a weight of 122 pounds. On 30 October, Cadland met Zinganee again, at level weights in the Audley End Stakes. He completed his hat-trick, winning by a head from Zinganee with the other two runners finishing well beaten.

=== 1830: five-year-old season ===
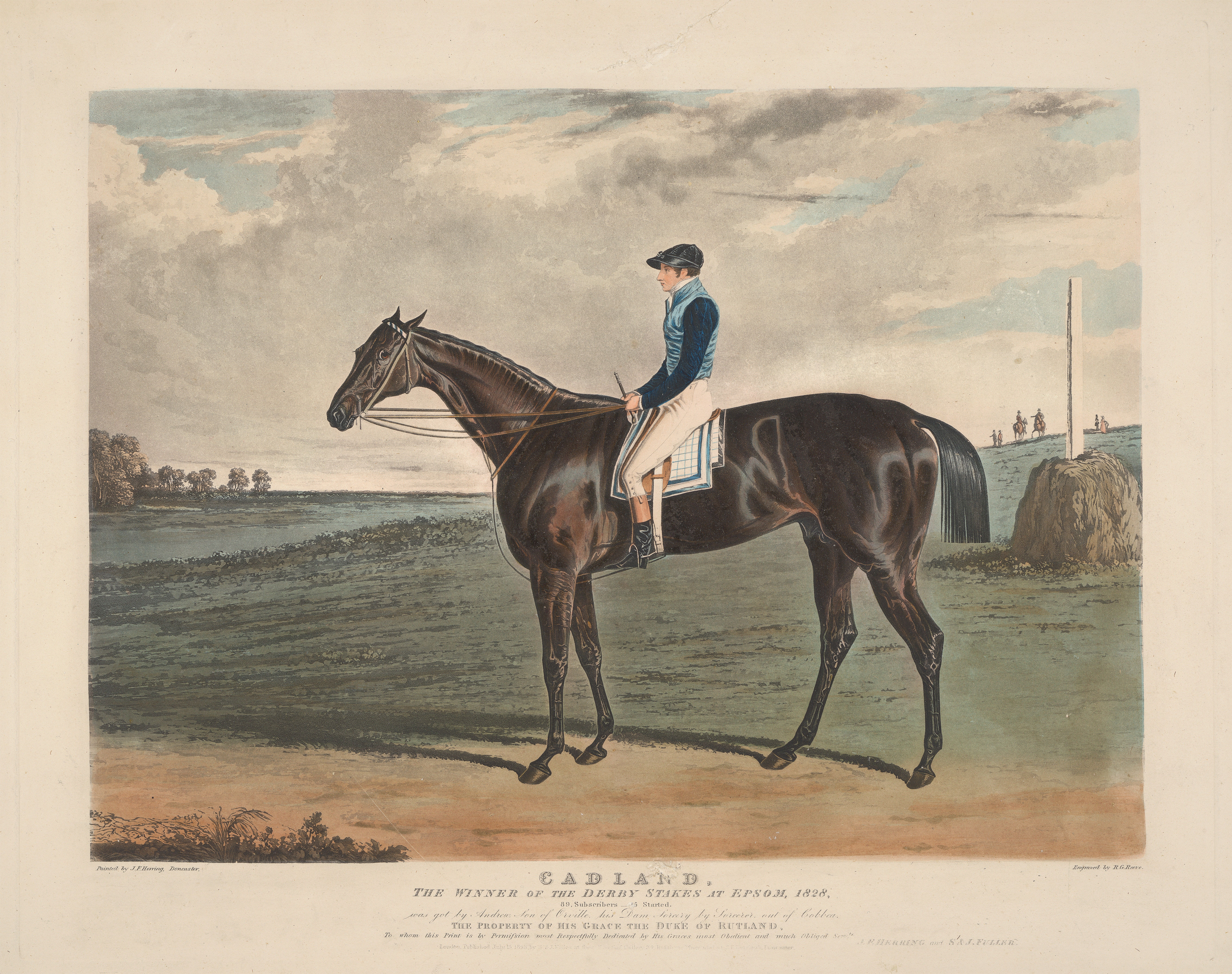
Cadland, engraved by Richard Gilson Reeve after John Frederick Herring, Sr.

Cadland ran six times at Newmarket in the early part of 1830. His first race saw him matched against Zinganee yet again in the Craven Stakes on 12 April. He started 3/1 second favourite with Zinganee on 6/1. On this occasion neither horse ran to his best form, with Cadland unplaced behind the filly Seraph. At the next Newmarket meeting Cadland walked over for a £50 race over three miles. On the following day Cadland ran in a one-mile match race in which he failed to concede seven pounds to the six-year-old Maresfield. Later that afternoon he collected £100 without having to race as he walked over for a King's Plate. On 10 May Cadland carried top weight of 128 pounds in a Handicap in which he finished third to Navarin, a four-year-old carrying 98 pounds. Cadland's spring campaign ended with another walkover in the Jockey Club Plate three days later.

In autumn, Cadland was beaten by his only rival, the four-year-old Gayhurst in a £50 race on 5 October. His next race was for The Whip, a four-mile challenge match for an antique trophy consisting of a riding whip said to have been owned by King Charles II and later modified to incorporate hairs from the mane and tail of Eclipse. At level weights, Cadland claimed the trophy by beating Zinganee in their sixth and final encounter, but the race was extremely grueling for both horses: Zinganee never ran again and some commentators believed Cadland never produced his best form in his subsequent races. At the Houghton meeting, Cadland walked over for a £25 race on 1 November. Four days later at the same meeting he finished third in the Audley End Stakes, carrying top weight of 130 pounds.

=== 1831: six-year-old season ===
On 4 April Cadland carried top weight in the Oatlands Stakes and finished second to the filly Varna, to whom he was conceding seventeen pounds. At the next meeting he won a £100 Sweepstakes, conceding twenty-four pounds to the filly Galopade. On the following day he dead-heated with Varna over three miles at weight-for-age and then beat the filly in a run-off. In the course of this meeting Cadland became the property of Mr E. Peel and ran for his new owner in his race against Varna.

On 3 August, Cadland raced away from Newmarket for the first time in more than two years when he finished third in the Oxford Cup behind Mazeppa. He appeared at Burton-on-Trent on 23 August, where he walked over in the local Cup. At Lichfield on 13 September he was beaten by a gelding named Jocko in the first heat of a Royal Plate and was withdrawn from the second. Although he was entered for further races, Cadland never ran again and was retired to stud.

== Assessment and honours ==
A pub in the village of Chilwell in Nottinghamshire is named after Cadland. Another English pub, The Running Horses at Mickleham, Surrey is named in honour of both Cadland and The Colonel, with one horse depicted on each side of the pub's sign. The Cadland House Stables, which include some of the oldest stable buildings in Newmarket, were once owned by the Duke of Rutland and were named after his Derby winner.

== Stud career ==
Cadland began his career as a stallion at the Bonehill stud farm near Tamworth in Staffordshire. His initial fee was 10 guineas for Thoroughbred mares and 4 guineas for others. Cadland had little success with his English runners and in 1833 he was sold and exported to France. He became an "important and influential" sire in his new country, siring the Prix du Jockey Club winner Romulus and the Prix du Cadran winner Nautilus. Cadland died in France in January 1837.

== Sire line tree ==
- Cadland
  - Arrow
  - The Prime Warden
    - Light
      - Bigarreau
  - Nautilus
  - Romulus

== Pedigree ==
Pedigree of Cadland (GB), brown stallion, 1825
Sire Andrew (GB) 1816	Orville; 1799	Beningbrough	King Fergus
Sire Andrew (GB) 1816	Orville; 1799	Beningbrough	Fenwick's Herod mare
Sire Andrew (GB) 1816	Orville; 1799	Evelina	Highflyer*
Sire Andrew (GB) 1816	Orville; 1799	Evelina	Termagant
Sire Andrew (GB) 1816	Morel; 1805	Sorcerer*	Trumpator*
Sire Andrew (GB) 1816	Morel; 1805	Sorcerer*	Young Giantess*
Sire Andrew (GB) 1816	Morel; 1805	Hornby Lass	Buzzard^
Sire Andrew (GB) 1816	Morel; 1805	Hornby Lass	Puzzle
Dam Sorcery (GB) 1808	Sorcerer*; 1796	Trumpator*	Conductor
Dam Sorcery (GB) 1808	Sorcerer*; 1796	Trumpator*	Brunette
Dam Sorcery (GB) 1808	Sorcerer*; 1796	Young Giantess*	Diomed
Dam Sorcery (GB) 1808	Sorcerer*; 1796	Young Giantess*	Giantess
Dam Sorcery (GB) 1808	Cobbea; 1802	Skyscraper	Highflyer*
Dam Sorcery (GB) 1808	Cobbea; 1802	Skyscraper	Everlasting
Dam Sorcery (GB) 1808	Cobbea; 1802	Woodpecker mare	Woodpecker*^
Dam Sorcery (GB) 1808	Cobbea; 1802	Woodpecker mare	Heinel (Family:12-a)

* Cadland is inbred 3S x 2D to the stallion Sorcerer, meaning that he appears third generation on the sire side of his pedigree and second generation on the dam side of his pedigree.

* Cadland is inbred 4S x 4D to the stallion Highflyer, meaning that he appears fourth generation on the sire side of his pedigree and fourth generation on the dam side of his pedigree.

*^ Cadland is inbred 5S x 4D to the stallion Woodpecker, meaning that he appears fifth generation (via Buzzard)^ on the sire side of his pedigree and fourth generation on the dam side of his pedigree.
