= Soothsayer (horse) =

British-bred Thoroughbred racehorse

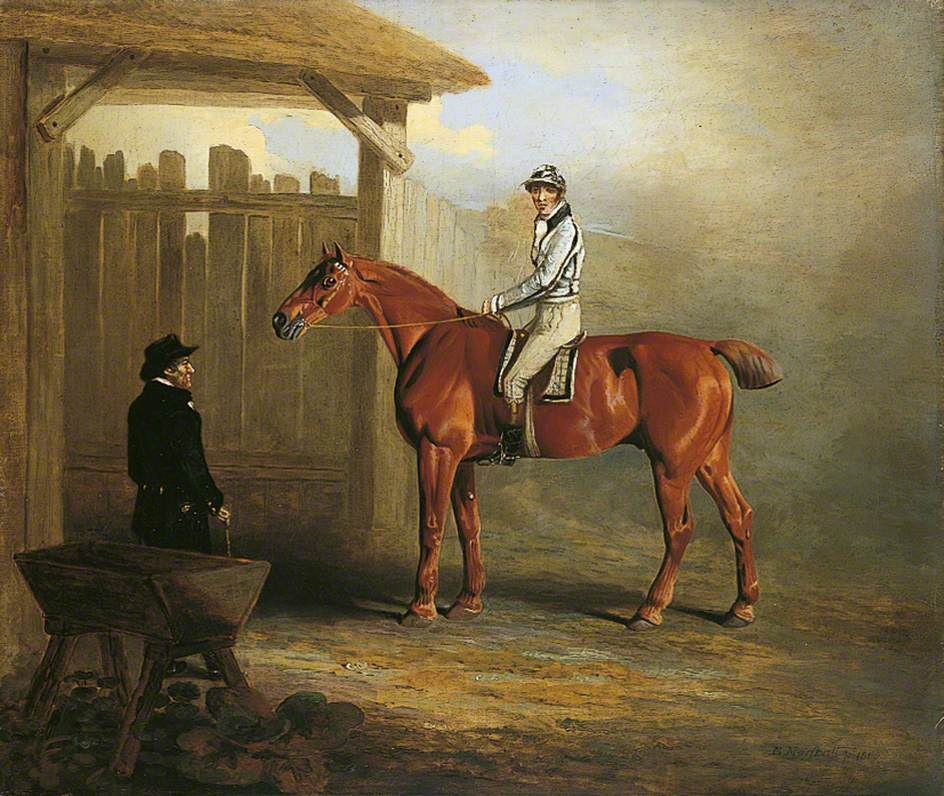
- 'Soothsayer', Winner of the St Leger
- Sire: Sorcerer
- Grandsire: Trumpator
- Dam: Golden Locks
- Damsire: Delpini
- Sex: Stallion
- Foaled: 1808
- Country: United Kingdom
- Colour: Chestnut
- Breeder: Richard Gascoigne
- Owner: Richard Gascoigne; Thomas Foley, 3rd Baron Foley
- Trainer: T Sykes
- Record: 7: 4–1–1

Major wins
- St Leger Stakes (1811); Doncaster Stakes (1811); Match against Phantom (1813)

Awards
- Leading sire in Great Britain and Ireland (1819)

Soothsayer (1808–1827) was a British Thoroughbred racehorse and sire best known for winning the classic St Leger Stakes in 1811. Bred and originally trained in Yorkshire, he won the St Leger on his third racecourse appearance when still unnamed. He was later sold and trained for the remainder of his racing career at Newmarket where he won a valuable sweepstakes in 1812 and a match race against the Derby winner Phantom in 1813. He later became a successful breeding stallion, siring two classic winners and being the Leading sire in Great Britain and Ireland in 1819. He was later exported to Russia where he died in 1827.

== Background ==
Soothsayer was a large, golden chestnut horse with no white markings bred in Yorkshire by his owner Richard Oliver Gascoigne. His sire, Sorcerer, was bred by Sir Charles Bunbury and was a half-brother of the 1801 Derby winning mare Eleanor. Sorcerer was an unusually large black horse who won several important races and became a successful breeding stallion. His progeny included the Derby winner Smolensko, the 2000 Guineas winners Wizard and Trophonius, and the Oaks winners Morel, Maid of Orleans and Sorcery. Sorcerer was the leading sire in Great Britain and Ireland in 1811, 1812 and 1813. Soothsayer's dam Golden Locks (or Goldenlocks) was a daughter of Violet, an influential broodmare whose other descendants included the St Leger winners Symmetry and Jerry as well as The Oaks winner Theophania.

== Racing career ==
=== 1811: three-year-old season ===
Until 1913, there was no requirement for British racehorses to have official names, and the horse who later became known as Soothsayer competed in 1811 as Mr. Gascoigne's ch. c. by Sorcerer.

Mr Gascoigne's colt was unraced as a two-year-old and did not make his first appearance until 20 August at York Racecourse. He started the 1/2 favourite for the three runner Peregrine Stakes over one and three-quarter miles but finished second to Mr. Garforth's bay colt by Hambletonian. On 23 September at Doncaster Racecourse Mr Gascoigne's colt was one of twenty-four colts and fillies to contest the thirty-sixth running of the St Leger Stakes. Ridden by Ben Smith he was made the 6/1 second choice in the betting behind Mr Astley's colt Magic, the 2/1 favourite, who had finished second to Phantom in the Derby. He won the classic from Amadis de Gaul, with Scamp in third place. Two days later at the same meeting, the still-unnamed colt added a win in the Doncaster Stakes.

Before the end of the year, the St Leger winner was sold for 2000 guineas to Lord Foley, and officially named Soothsayer.

=== 1812: four-year-old season ===
For the 1812 season, Soothsayer raced exclusively at Newmarket Racecourse and began his four-year-old season on 16 April at the Craven meeting. Despite carrying top weight of 130 pounds he started 5/4 favourite for a ten furlong sweepstakes and won the 750 guineas prize by beating the Duke of Rutland's colt Grimalkin by a neck. This proved to be Soothsayer's only win of the season. At the next Newmarket meeting two weeks later he started 2/1 joint favourite for a 1200 guinea sweepstakes but finished unplaced behind Rainbow and Sorcery.

After a break of six months, Soothsayer returned for the Newmarket Hoghton meeting in late October, where he had three engagements, but raced only once. He was withdrawn from both the Garden Stakes (won by Grimalkin) and a match against the Duke of Rutland's filly Elizabeth before finishing last of the three runners behind Sorcery in a sweepstakes over the Abington Mile course.

=== 1813: five-year-old season ===
Soothsayer's only race of 1813 came on 19 April, the opening day of the Craven meeting, when he ran a ten furlong match race against the 1811 Epsom Derby winner Phantom, with each classic winner carrying 119 pounds. Phantom was made the 2/5 betting favourite, but Soothsayer, ridden by Bill Clift defeated the Derby winner easily to claim a 500 guinea prize. Soothsayer was entered in the Garden Stakes on 18 October, but did not run, with Foley paying a 50 guinea forfeit.

== Stud career ==
Soothsayer began his stud career at Newmarket in 1814, standing at a fee of 20 guineas, and a guinea for the groom.

Soothsayer was an immediate success as a breeding stallion. In his first season, he sired Interpreter who won the 2000 Guineas and Filagree, who became an extremely successful broodmare, producing Cobweb (1000 Guineas and Oaks Stakes), Charlotte West (Oaks) and Riddlesworth (2000 Guineas). His next crop of foals included the Derby winner Tiresias whose victories in 1819 enabled Soothsayer to become that year's Champion sire. By this time he was standing at Chippenham, near Newmarket at a fee of 25 guineas.

Despite his success, Soothsayer's popularity appeared to wane, and by 1821 he was standing at Lambton Park, County Durham for 10 guineas a mare. Two years later he was sold and exported to Russia, where he died in 1827.

== Sire line tree ==
- Soothsayer
  - Interpreter
  - Welbeck
    - Bedlamite
  - Tiresias
    - Bud

== Pedigree ==
Pedigree of Soothsayer (GB), chestnut stallion, 1808
Sire Sorcerer (GB) 1796	Trumpator; 1782	Conductor	Matchem*
Sire Sorcerer (GB) 1796	Trumpator; 1782	Conductor	Snap Mare
Sire Sorcerer (GB) 1796	Trumpator; 1782	Brunette	Squirrel
Sire Sorcerer (GB) 1796	Trumpator; 1782	Brunette	Dove
Sire Sorcerer (GB) 1796	Young Giantess; 1790	Diomed	Florizel
Sire Sorcerer (GB) 1796	Young Giantess; 1790	Diomed	Sister to Juno
Sire Sorcerer (GB) 1796	Young Giantess; 1790	Giantess	Matchem*
Sire Sorcerer (GB) 1796	Young Giantess; 1790	Giantess	Molly Longlegs
Dam Golden Locks (GB) 1793	Delpini; 1781	Highflyer	Herod
Dam Golden Locks (GB) 1793	Delpini; 1781	Highflyer	Rachel
Dam Golden Locks (GB) 1793	Delpini; 1781	Countess	Blank
Dam Golden Locks (GB) 1793	Delpini; 1781	Countess	Rib mare
Dam Golden Locks (GB) 1793	Violet; 1785	Shark	Marske
Dam Golden Locks (GB) 1793	Violet; 1785	Shark	Snap mare
Dam Golden Locks (GB) 1793	Violet; 1785	Syphon mare	Syphon
Dam Golden Locks (GB) 1793	Violet; 1785	Syphon mare	Charlotte (Family 15)

* Soothsayer is inbred 4S × 4S to the stallion Matchem, meaning that he appears twice fourth generation on the sire side of his pedigree.
