= John Saunders (jockey) =

British jockey

Personal information
- Occupation: Jockey

Horse racing career
- Sport: Horse racing

Major racing wins
- British Classic Races; Epsom Derby (1801); Epsom Oaks (1801)

Significant horses
- Eleanor

John Saunders was a British Classic winning jockey, prominent at the turn of the 19th century. In 1801, he became the first man to win the Derby (primarily known as a race for colts) on a filly, Eleanor, a horse on which he also won the Oaks. This made him the first man to do the double on the same horse and only the third to do the double in the same year.

== Major wins ==
(United Kingdom) Great Britain

- Epsom Derby – Eleanor (1801)
- Epsom Oaks – Eleanor (1801)
