= Trophonius (horse) =

British-bred Thoroughbred racehorse

- Sire: Sorcerer
- Grandsire: Trumpator
- Dam: Dungannon mare
- Damsire: Dungannon
- Sex: Stallion
- Foaled: 1808
- Country: United Kingdom
- Colour: Black
- Breeder: Mr Kellerman
- Owner: Robert Andrew
- Trainer: R D Boyce
- Record: 11: 3-5-1

Major wins
- 2000 Guineas (1811); Newmarket Stakes (1811)

Trophonius (1808 – after 1827) was a British Thoroughbred racehorse and sire and best known for winning the classic 2000 Guineas in 1811. Trophonius won his first three races at Newmarket Racecourse in the spring of 1811, including the Guineas and the Newmarket Stakes on the following afternoon, but ran disappointingly when favourite for The Derby. He never recovered his best form and was beaten in his remaining seven races. Shortly after his retirement he was sold and exported to stand as a breeding stallion in Russia.

== Background ==
Trophonius was a black horse bred by Mr Kellermann. He was sired by Sorcerer, a successful racehorse and three-time Champion sire in Britain. Amongst Sorcerer's other progeny were 2000 Guineas and Derby winner Smolensko, St. Leger winner Soothsayer and the Oaks winners Morel, Maid of Orleans and Sorcery. Trophonius was the second of only three foals produced by his dam, an unnamed daughter of Dungannon bred by Dennis O'Kelly.

Trophonius's racing career overlapped with that of a horse of the same name owned by the Earl of Darlington: the Guineas winner was sometimes known as Black Trophonius to distinguish him from his bay namesake. He was owned throughout his racing career by Robert Andrew.

== Racing career ==
=== 1811: three-year-old season ===
Trophonius began his racing career on 17 April 1811 at the Craven meeting at Newmarket. He won a sweepstakes over the Abington Mile course, beating Mr Lawrell's filly Psyche, his only opponent. At the next Newmarket meeting thirteen days later Trophonius was one of eleven three-year-olds, from an original entry of twenty-three, to contest the third running of the 2000 Guineas over the Rowley Mile course. Ridden by Sam Barnard, the black colt started the 5/2 favourite and "won easy" from Lord Grosvenor's filly Barrosa with Magus third and Hit-or-Miss fourth. On the following afternoon Trophonius won the Newmarket Stakes over the Ditch Mile course, easily beating Merrygoround, with the subsequent Oaks Stakes winner Sorcery in third place. On 30 May, Trophonius was moved up in distance to contest the Derby Stakes over one and a half miles at Epsom Downs Racecourse. He started the 3/1 favourite but finished unplaced behind Phantom.

Trophonius did not race again for almost five months. He was entered in two races at Newmarket's First October meeting but was withdrawn from both events, with Robert Andrew paying a forfeit on both occasions. At the Houghton meeting on 28 October, Trophonius ran in two matches on the same day. He was beaten by Mr Shakespear's filly Sprite over five furlongss and by the Duke of Grafton's Web over the two-mile Ditch-In course.

=== 1812: four-year-old season ===
Trophonius remained in training as a four-year-old but failed to win in five races beginning with an unplaced effort behind Rainbow in a sweepstakes at Newmarket on 1 May. He did not race again until the autumn when he was beaten in two match races by Mr Shakespear's colt Hydaspes at the First and Second October meetings. Trophonius was entered in three races at the Houghton meeting, which began on 26 October. He was withdrawn from the Garden Stakes, finished third to Woful in a handicap race over the Abington Mile and was beaten by Lord Jersey's three-year-old Orson in a five furlong match.

== Stud career ==
Trophonius was retired from racing to become a breeding stallion but made no impact in Britain. He was later sold and exported to Russia.

== Pedigree ==
Pedigree of Trophonius (GB), black stallion, 1808
Sire Sorcerer (GB) 1796	Trumpator; 1782	Conductor*	Matchem*
Sire Sorcerer (GB) 1796	Trumpator; 1782	Conductor*	Snap Mare*
Sire Sorcerer (GB) 1796	Trumpator; 1782	Brunette	Squirrel*
Sire Sorcerer (GB) 1796	Trumpator; 1782	Brunette	Dove
Sire Sorcerer (GB) 1796	Young Giantess; 1790	Diomed	Florizel
Sire Sorcerer (GB) 1796	Young Giantess; 1790	Diomed	Sister to Juno
Sire Sorcerer (GB) 1796	Young Giantess; 1790	Giantess	Matchem*
Sire Sorcerer (GB) 1796	Young Giantess; 1790	Giantess	Molly Longlegs
Dam Dungannon mare(GB) 1800	Dungannon; 1780	Eclipse	Marske
Dam Dungannon mare(GB) 1800	Dungannon; 1780	Eclipse	Spilletta
Dam Dungannon mare(GB) 1800	Dungannon; 1780	Aspasia	Herod
Dam Dungannon mare(GB) 1800	Dungannon; 1780	Aspasia	Doris
Dam Dungannon mare(GB) 1800	Flirtilla; 1783	Conductor*	Matchem*
Dam Dungannon mare(GB) 1800	Flirtilla; 1783	Conductor*	Snap mare*
Dam Dungannon mare(GB) 1800	Flirtilla; 1783	Flirt	Squirrel*
Dam Dungannon mare(GB) 1800	Flirtilla; 1783	Flirt	Helen (Family 9-d)

* Trophonius is inbred 3S × 3D to the stallion Conductor, meaning that he appears third generation on the sire side of his pedigree and third generation on the dam side of his pedigree.

* Trophonius is inbred 4S × 4S x 4D to the stallion Matchem, meaning that he appears twice fourth generation on the sire side of his pedigree and once fourth generation on the dam side of his pedigree.

* Trophonius is inbred 4S × 4D to the stallion Squirrel, meaning that he appears fourth generation on the sire side of his pedigree and fourth generation on the dam side of his pedigree.

* Trophonius is inbred 4S × 4D to the mare Snap mare, meaning that she appears fourth generation on the sire side of his pedigree and fourth generation on the dam side of his pedigree.
