= Rabicano =

Horse coat colors and patterns, such as white ticking or roaning

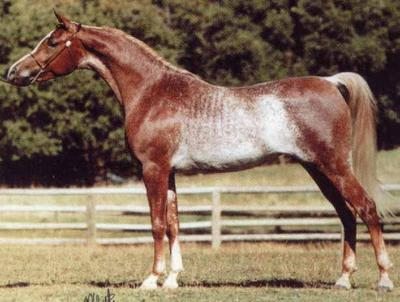
An extensively expressed rabicano Arabian horse

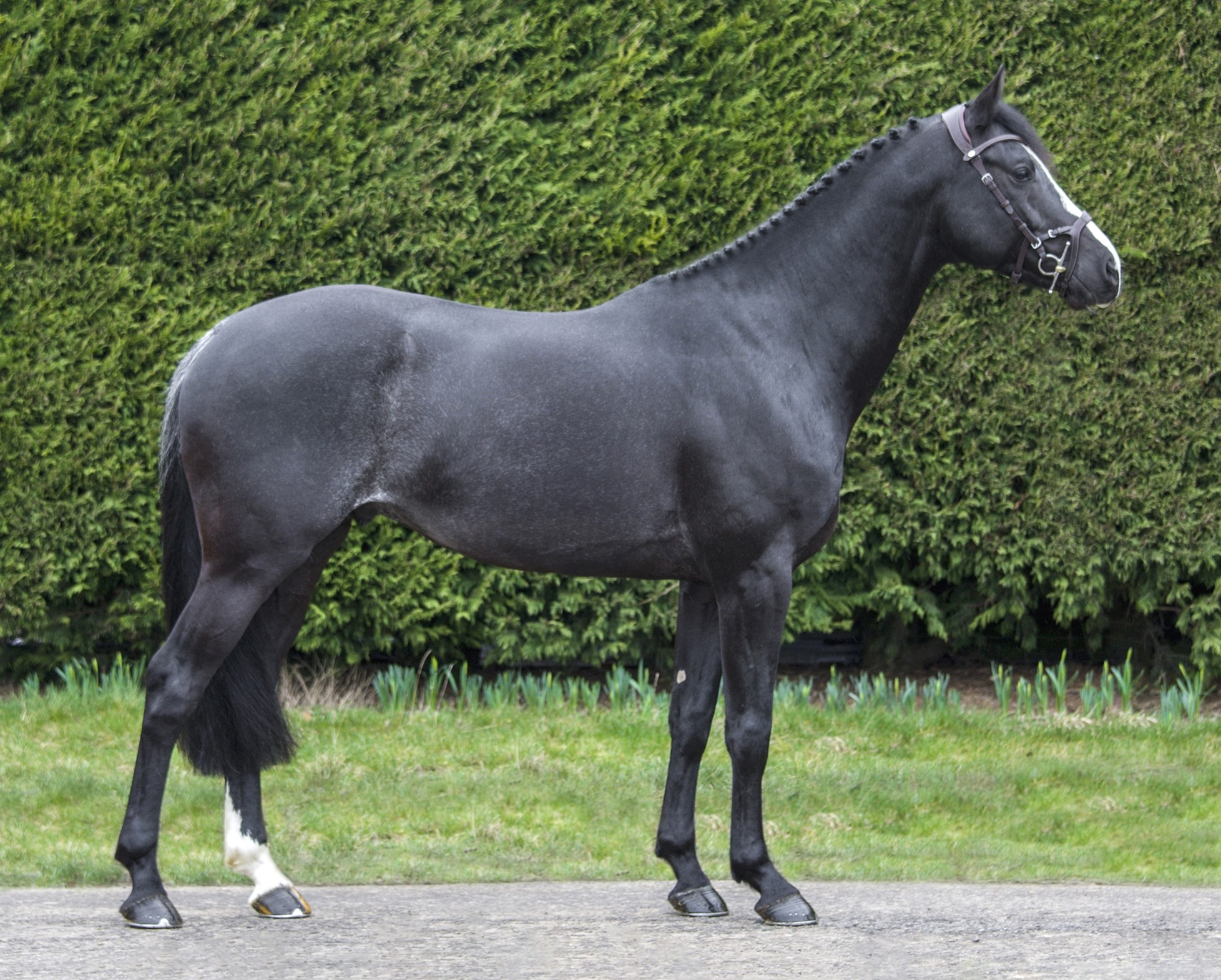
Classic rabicano markings on flanks and a skunk tail

Rabicano, sometimes called white ticking, is a horse coat color characterized by limited roaning in a specific pattern: its most minimal form is expressed by white hairs at the top of a horse's tail, often is expressed by additional interspersed white hairs seen first at the flank, then other parts of the body radiating out from the flank, where the white hairs will be most pronounced. Rabicano is distinct from true roan, which causes evenly interspersed white hairs throughout the body, except for solid-colored head and legs.

== Etymology ==
The word, "rabicano" is of Spanish origin - rabo meaning "tail" and cano meaning "white" - thus, it described a horse with white hairs in its tail. The word appears very early in epic poems in Italian literature: In Orlando Innamorato (1495), "Rabicano" is a magic horse originally ridden by Argalia. In Italian, the term simply means "roan" and might therefore have been a descriptive name.

== Characteristics ==
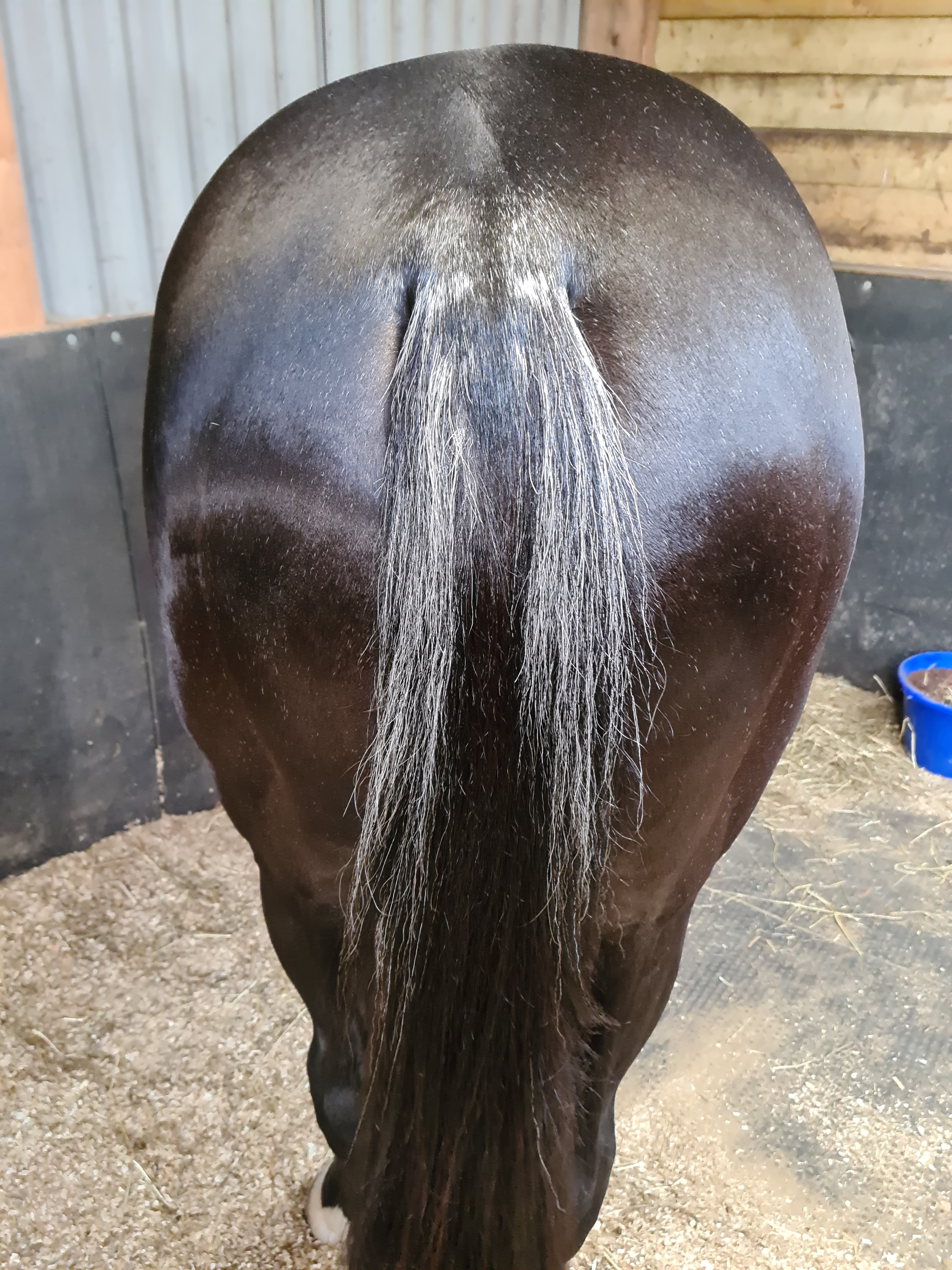
Skunk tail

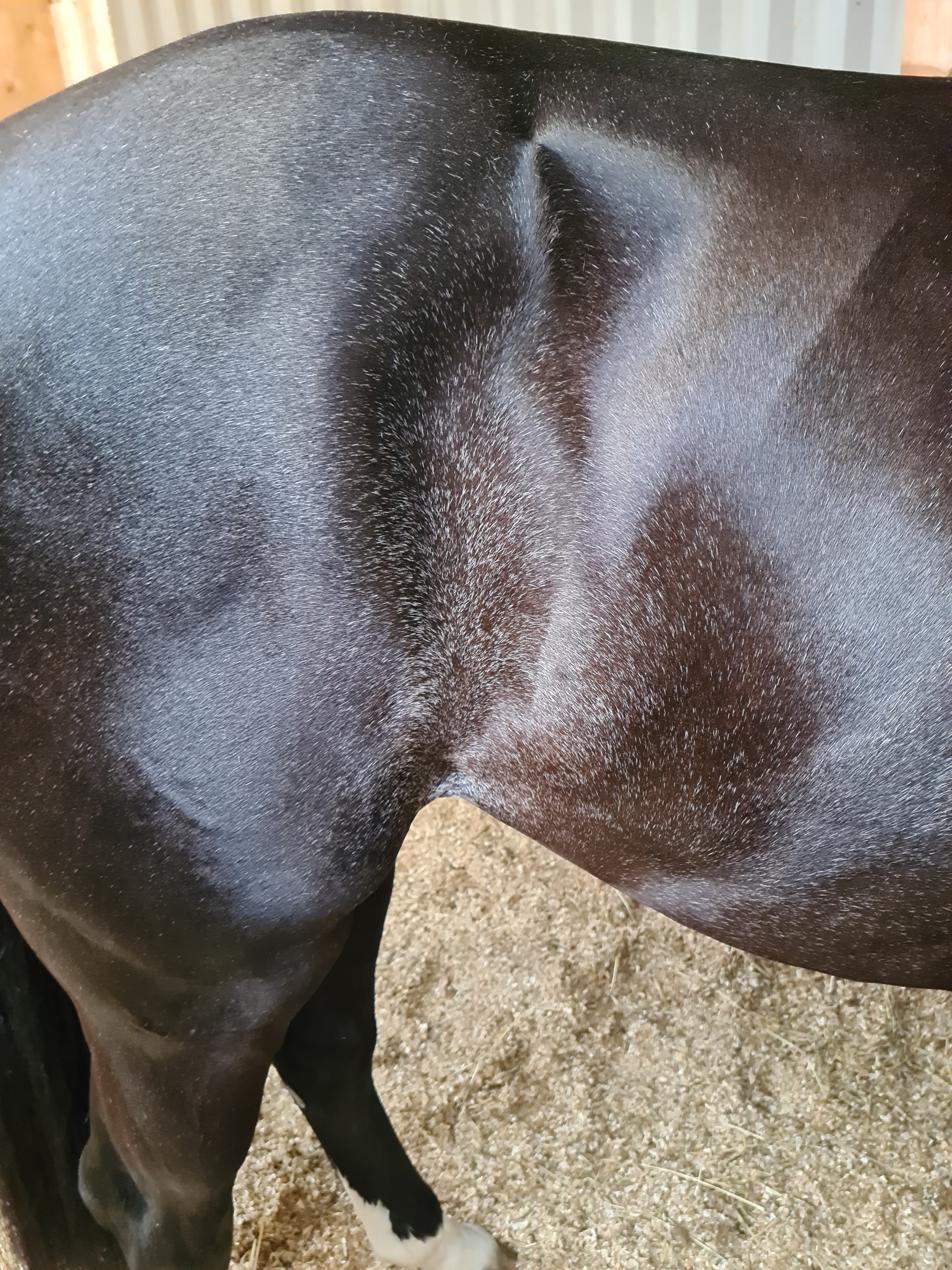
Flank ticking

The characteristics most often associated with the rabicano pattern are white hairs at the tailhead and the flank, where the body of the horse is joined by the hindquarters. Like other patterns and colors, the expression of the rabicano trait varies. Most of the factors affecting these variations are unknown, however, it is known that horses with a chestnut or chestnut-based coat express white patterns such as rabicano more readily; that is, they tend to have more white. Minimal expression may include a few white hairs in those areas, but is often not mentioned in descriptions of an individual horse's color. Rabicano is a white pattern that falls into the category of roaning or scattered white hairs, the genetics of which are not yet fully understood, but are apparently a different genetic mechanism from true roan.

The original definition of "rabicano" referred to the presence of white hairs in the base of the tail, a characteristic called a "skunk" or coon tail. The term "coon tail" is associated with white hairs in the form of striping at the tailhead. The sides of the tail at the tailhead may have much white hair. Extensively marked rabicanos sometimes exhibit striations in their pattern on the ribs, giving them a striped appearance.

== Prevalence and inheritance ==
The rabicano pattern is thought to be a dominant gene in some families, however other forms of white ticking not following the rabicano pattern may exist and be controlled by separate mechanisms. Rabicano is present even in breeds which do not possess any true roan individuals, such as Arabian horses. In the Arabian, rabicano patterning is even defined as "roan." Rabicano may occur on any base color and may occur in conjunction with any other white pattern, including true roan or gray.

Higher expression of the rabicano pattern on the flanks may produce a coat easy to mistake for true roan. However, in highly expressed rabicanos, the distribution of white hairs along the barrel may produce faint striping or stippling over the ribs, which is not seen in true roans. Furthermore, the skin of some rabicanos may be slightly mottled with pink, particularly on the abdomen and groin. This trait is not seen in true roans, and suggests that, like the white hairs associated with other white markings and patterns, the white hairs of a rabicano may be rooted in unpigmented skin cells. However, the genetic and developmental controls of such roaning are poorly understood, and has not yet been formally studied.

While rabicano itself does not produce white markings on the face and legs, it can be confused with some of the numerous sabino patterns, one of which has been mapped to the KIT gene. Other color patterns mapped to KIT include tobiano and true roan. This may explain the close association between rabicano and sabino, which are often observed in the same horse.

== Vs. roan ==
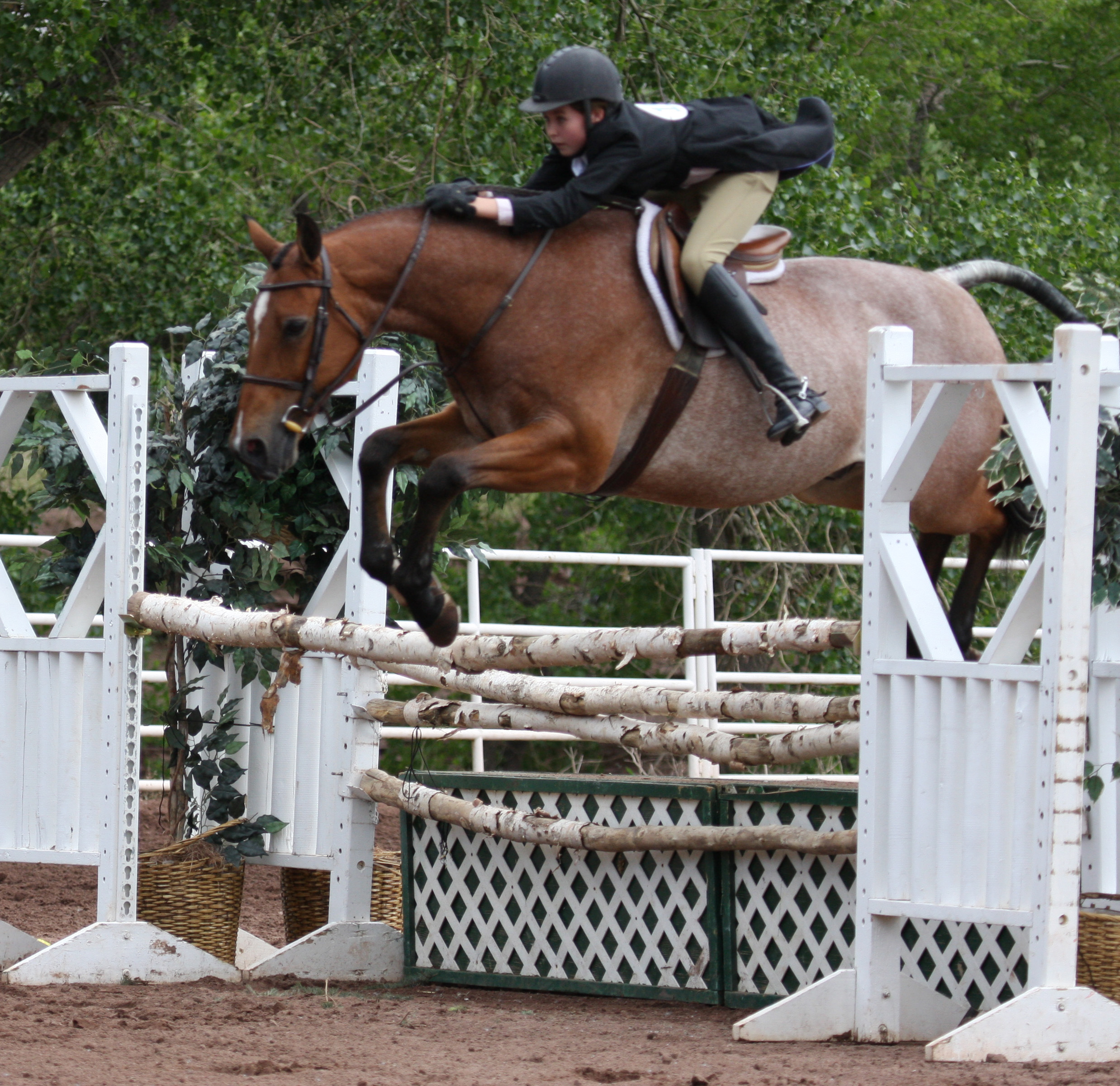
This horse could be either roan or rabicano; lack of white hairs on forehand and presence of skunk tail suggest rabicano, but overall body pattern is more typical of a roan.

Rarely is rabicano patterning extensive enough to be confused with true roan. It is, however, possible for a horse to carry both rabicano and roan genes. Rabicanos are not true roans and can be distinguished from true roans by the following:

- Roaning on rabicanos is centralized at the junction of the stifle and the flank; true roan is evenly distributed over the whole body except the points.
- Rabicanos usually have skunk tails or rings of white hairs in the tail, while true roans do not.
- Rabicano roaning often spreads, while true roans usually become darker.
- Rabicanos do not develop corn marks when their skin is damaged.

== Vs. sabino ==
Sabino patterning usually is expressed with high white legs markings with white sometimes extending onto the belly, face, and chin; sabinos often lack the white hairs at the base of the tail that characterize rabicano. A horse may carry the genes for both patterns, however.

== See also ==
- Equine coat color
- Equine coat color genetics
