= Young Giantess =

British Thoroughbred racehorse

- Sire: Diomed
- Grandsire: Florizel
- Dam: Giantess
- Damsire: Matchem
- Sex: Mare
- Foaled: 1790
- Country: Great Britain
- Colour: Bay
- Breeder: Sir Charles Bunbury
- Owner: Sir Charles Bunbury
- Record: 5: 0-2-2

Young Giantess (1790–1811) was a British Thoroughbred racehorse and broodmare. She failed to win any of the five races she contested, but became a successful broodmare for Sir Charles Bunbury. She foaled the successful sire Sorcerer and Derby and Oaks winner Eleanor.

== Background ==
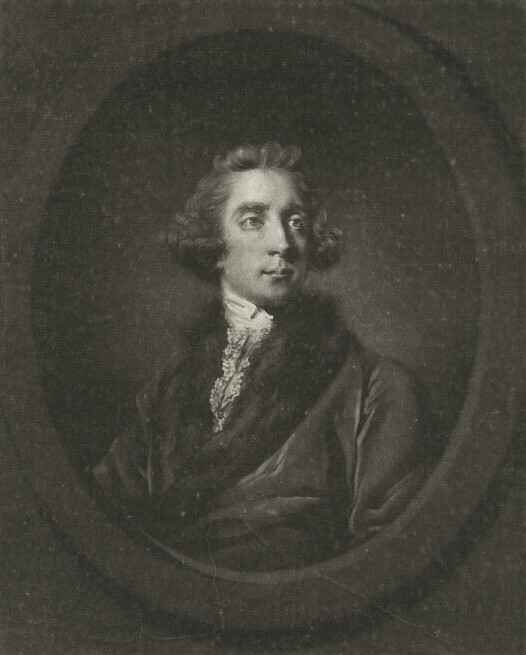
Young Giantess's owner Sir Charles Bunbury

Young Giantess was a bay filly bred by Sir Charles Bunbury and foaled in 1790. She was sired by Epsom Derby winner Diomed. Diomed had little success as a stallion in Britain, but was exported to America where he sired Sir Archy and many others. Young Giantess was the tenth foal of Giantess, a daughter of Matchem.

== Racing career ==
Young Giantess, then unnamed, was due to make her racecourse debut on 16 April 1793 in the first class of the Filly Stakes at Newmarket, but was withdrawn, with the race being won by Caelia. Her first race came in May at Epsom Downs in the Oaks Stakes. She finished the race unplaced behind winner Caelia. In July she lost to Cymbeline in the Prince's Stakes at Brighthelmstone. On the final day of the same meeting she lost a £50 race to a Mercury colt and Coal-merchant. At Newmarket's first October meeting she finished last of the three runners, behind winner Rally, in a Handicap Sweepstakes. In her final race, Young Giantess lost a match race against Paynator.

== Stud career ==
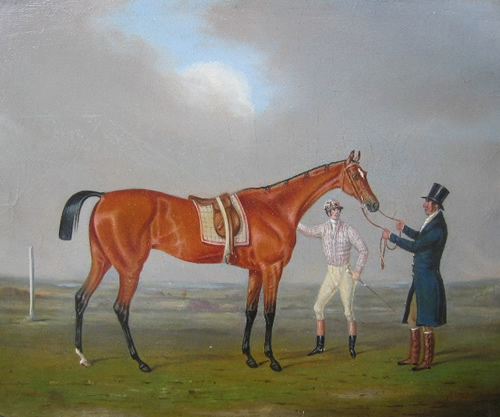
Young Giantess' daughter Eleanor

As a broodmare for Sir Charles Bunbury Young Giantess produced ten foals. They were:

- Sorcerer – a black stallion foaled in 1796 and sired by Trumpator. He won fifteen races, including the October Oatlands Stakes in 1800. He also became a leading stallion and was British Champion sire three times. He sired many top racehorses and sires, including Morel, Maid of Orleans, Wizard, Soothsayer, Sorcery, Trophonius, Comus and Smolensko.
- Clarissa – a bay filly foaled in 1797 and sired by Whiskey.
- Eleanor – a bay mare foaled in 1798 and sired by Whiskey. She won the Derby and Oaks in 1801. As a broodmare she produced the sire Muley.
- Julia – a brown mare foaled in 1799 and sired by Whiskey. She only produced two foals before dying in 1810, but one of these foals was Derby winner and Champion sire Phantom.
- Young Whiskey – a bay stallion foaled in 1801 and sired by Whiskey. He retired from racing after an accident which caused him to go lame and stood as a sire at Oatlands in Surrey.
- Lydia – a brown mare foaled in 1802 and sired by Whiskey. She produced two foals and died in foaling of the second, who was hand-reared.
- Leonardo – a chestnut colt foaled in 1803 and sired by Whiskey.
- Fair Star – a brown colt foaled in 1806 and sired by Whiskey. He finished fourth behind winner Pope in the 1809 Derby.
- Cressida – a bay mare foaled in 1807 and sired by Whiskey. She was the dam of Derby winner and Champion sire Priam as well as 2000 Guineas winner Antar.
- Walton mare – a chestnut mare foaled in 1808 and sired by Walton. She foaled 2000 Guineas winner Nicolo and the sire Langar.

Young Giantess died in 1811, when foaling twins by Giles. Both foals also died.

== Pedigree ==
Pedigree of Young Giantess, bay mare, 1790
Sire Diomed (GB) ch. 1777	Florizel (GB) b. 1768	Herod b. 1758	Tartar
Sire Diomed (GB) ch. 1777	Florizel (GB) b. 1768	Herod b. 1758	Cypron
Sire Diomed (GB) ch. 1777	Florizel (GB) b. 1768	Cygnet mare gr. 1761	Cygnet
Sire Diomed (GB) ch. 1777	Florizel (GB) b. 1768	Cygnet mare gr. 1761	Cartouch mare
Sire Diomed (GB) ch. 1777	Spectator mare (GB); 1763	Spectator b. 1749	Crab
Sire Diomed (GB) ch. 1777	Spectator mare (GB); 1763	Spectator b. 1749	Partner mare
Sire Diomed (GB) ch. 1777	Spectator mare (GB); 1763	Horatia b. 1758	Blank
Sire Diomed (GB) ch. 1777	Spectator mare (GB); 1763	Horatia b. 1758	Childers mare
Dam Giantess (GB) b. 1769	Matchem (GB) b. 1748	Cade b. 1734	Godolphin Arabian*
Dam Giantess (GB) b. 1769	Matchem (GB) b. 1748	Cade b. 1734	Roxana
Dam Giantess (GB) b. 1769	Matchem (GB) b. 1748	Partner mare 1735	Partner
Dam Giantess (GB) b. 1769	Matchem (GB) b. 1748	Partner mare 1735	Brown Farewell
Dam Giantess (GB) b. 1769	Molly Long Legs (GB); 1753	Babraham b. 1740	Godolphin Arabian*
Dam Giantess (GB) b. 1769	Molly Long Legs (GB); 1753	Babraham b. 1740	Large Hartley Mare
Dam Giantess (GB) b. 1769	Molly Long Legs (GB); 1753	Cole's Foxhunter mare	Cole's Foxhunter
Dam Giantess (GB) b. 1769	Molly Long Legs (GB); 1753	Cole's Foxhunter mare	Partner mare

Note: b. = Bay, ch. = Chestnut, gr. = Grey

* Young Giantess is inbred 4S × 4D to the stallion Godolphin Arabian, meaning that he appears fourth generation on the sire side of his pedigree and fourth generation on the dam side of his pedigree.
