= Newmarket Stakes =

Flat horse race in Britain

- Class: Listed
- Location: Rowley Mile; Newmarket, England
- Race type: Flat / Thoroughbred
- Sponsor: Nyetimber
- Website: Newmarket

Race information
- Distance: 1m 2f (2,012 metres)
- Surface: Turf
- Track: Straight
- Qualification: Three-year-old colts and geldings
- Weight: 9 st 2 lb Penalties; 5 lb for Group winners * 3 lb for Listed winners * * after 31 August 2024
- Purse: £55,000 (2025); 1st: £31,191

Newmarket Stakes
2026
Ancient Egypt	My Love Is King	Archers Bay

Previous years
2025
Alpine Trail	Nebras	Ernst Blofeld
2024
Caviar Heights	Sayedaty Sadaty	Whip Cracker
2023
Castle Way	Circle of Fire	Victory Dance
2022
Nations Pride	Hoo Ya Mal	Subastar
2021
Mohaafeth	Secret Protector	Inigo Jones

2020-2011
2020
Mishriff	Volkan Star	Waldkonig
2019
Uae Jewel	Walkinthesand	Persian Moon
2018
Key Victory	Old Persian	Highbrow
2017
Permian	Speedo Boy	Khalidi
2016
Hawkbill	Abdon	Sky Kingdom
2015
Best Of Times	Balios	Tempus Temporis
2014
Barley Mow	Mutakayyef	Pinzolo
2013
Windhoek	Centurius	Hoarding
2012
Noble Mission	Mariner's Cross	Michelangelo
2011
Ocean War	Cai Shen	Treasury Devil

2010-2001
2010
Gardening Leave	Wigmore Hall	Rashaad
2009
Your Old Pal	Palavicini	Spring Of Fame
2008
Kandahar Run	Meeriss	Better Hand
2007
Salford Mill	Acapulco	Eastern Anthem
2006
Mulaqat	Purple Moon	Morghim
2005
Rocamadour	Daring Ransom	Fu Manchu
2004
Hazyview	Tahreeb	Crocodile Dundee
2003
Delsarte	Wilful	Splendid Era
2002
Highdown	Moon Ballad	Judgement
2001
Rosi's Boy	Fair Question	Morshdi

2000-1991
2000
Beat Hollow	Sandmason	Entisar
1999
Beat All	Mukhalif	Silver Robin
1998
Dr Fong	Sensory	Mutawwaj
1997
Sandstone	Haltarra	Musical Dancer
1996
Mick's Love	Bahamian Knight	Ramooz
1995
Presenting	Anchor Clever	Sotoboy
1994
Alriffa	Darnay	Shepton Mallet
1993
Tenby	Planetary Aspect	Desert Team
1992
Captain Horatius	Shuailaan	Jeune
1991
Walim	Stone Mill	Prince Russanor

1990-1988
1990
Theatrical Charmer	Dorset Duke	Rudy's Fantasy
1989
Prince Of Dance	Observation Post	Prince Ibrahim
1988
Minster Son	Red Glow	Topsider Man

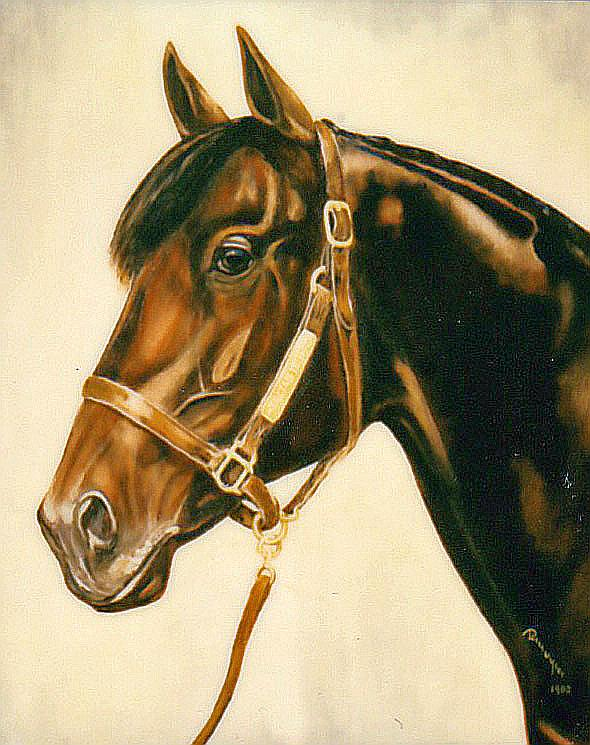
Shirley Heights, by Bob Demuyser (1920-2003)

The Newmarket Stakes is a Listed flat horse race in Great Britain open to three-year-old colts and geldings. It is run over a distance of 1 mile and 2 furlongs (2,012 metres) on the Rowley Mile at Newmarket in late April or early May.

== History ==
The original version of the Newmarket Stakes was established in the early 19th century. It was usually held on the final day of the venue's First Spring meeting in late April or early May. It was run on the Ditch Mile course over distances slightly under a mile. It ended after a period of small fields and walkovers in the 1880s.

A new version of the race was introduced in 1889. From this point it took place at Newmarket's Second Spring meeting in mid-May. It was contested over 1¼ miles, and it became a major trial for The Derby. It continued until the early 1960s.

The present version of the race was first run in 1978. It was initially called the Heathorn Stakes. The inaugural running was won by the subsequent Derby winner Shirley Heights. It was renamed the Newmarket Stakes in 1986.

The Newmarket Stakes is currently held on the opening day of the three-day Guineas Festival meeting in late April or early May.

== Records ==
Leading jockey since 1900 (6 wins):

- Pat Eddery – Theatrical Charmer (1990), Walim (1991), Tenby (1993), Sandstone (1997), Beat All (1999), Rosi's Boy (2001)

Leading trainer since 1900 (10 wins):

- Sir Henry Cecil – Masked Marvel (1979), Mr Fluorocarbon (1982), Claude Monet (1984), Slip Anchor (1985), Verd-Antique (1986), Tenby (1993), Dr Fong (1998), Beat Hollow (2000), Kandahar Run (2008), Noble Mission (2012)

== Winners since 1900 ==
Year	Winner	Jockey	Trainer	Time
1900	Diamond Jubilee	Herbert Jones	Richard Marsh	2:09.60
1901	William the Third	Mornington Cannon	John Porter	2:09.00
1902	Fowling-Piece (Note: Ard Patrick finished first in 1902, but he was disqualified for bumping and boring.)	Clem Jenkins	J Dawson	2:08.40
1903	Flotsam
1904	Henry the First	Otto Madden	Albert Gilbert	2:08.60
1905	Cicero	Danny Maher	Percy Peck	2:10.80
1906	Lally	Bernard Dillon	Fallon	2:09.20
1907	Acclaim	Billy Higgs	Fred Darling
1908	St Wolf	Herbert Jones	Dawson Waugh	2:10.80
1909	Louviers	George Stern	Dawson Waugh
1910	Meeting not held due to the death of King Edward VII
1911	Sunstar	George Stern	Charles Morton	2:07.60
1912	Cylgad	Frank O'Neill	William Halsey	2:07.20
1913	Craganour	Danny Maher	Jack Robinson	2:05.40
1914	Corcyra	Frank O'Neill	Captain Robert Dewhurst	2:01.80
1915	Danger Rock	Albert Whalley	John Watson
1916	Figaro	Albert Whalley	Peter Gilpin	2:07.20
1917	no race
1918	Somme Kiss	Skeets Martin	Samuel Pickering
1919	Dominion	Arthur Smith	Frank Barling	2:12.80
1920	Allenby	Fred Slade	Percy Linton	2:04.80
1921	Lemonora	Joe Childs	Alec Taylor Jr.	2:08.80
1922	Pondoland	Frank O'Neill	Etienne De Mestre	2:09.60
1923	Top Gallant	Frank Bullock	Harry Sadler	2:00.00
1924	Hurstwood	Vic Smyth	Alec Taylor Jr.	2:13.00
1925	Bross Bow	Frank Bullock	Alec Taylor Jr.	2:04.80
1926 (Note: The 1926 meeting was abandoned due the 1926 United Kingdom general strike)	Abandoned due to a UK General Strike
1927	Call Boy	Charlie Elliott	Jack Watts	2:06.60
1928	Fairway	Tommy Weston	Frank Butters	2:03.60
1929	Hunter's Moon	Tommy Weston	Frank Butters	2:05.00
1930	The Scout II	Joe Childs	Cecil Boyd-Rochfort	2:05.80
1931	Sir Andrew	Rufus Beasley	Cecil Boyd-Rochfort	2:09.00
1932	Miracle	Harry Wragg	Jack Jarvis	2:10.60
1933	Young Lover	Richard Perryman	Frank Butters	2:11.00
1934	Windsor Lad	Charlie Smirke	Marcus Marsh	2:04.00
1935	Bobsleigh	Richard Perryman	Colledge Leader	2:04.40
1936	Flares	Rufus Beasley	Cecil Boyd-Rochfort	2:06.20
1937	Cash Book	Gordon Richards	Joseph Lawson	2:12.40
1938	Golden Sovereign	Tommy Weston	Harry Cottrill	2:10.40
1939	Fairstone	Michael Beary	Harry Cottrill	2:06.20
1940	Lighthouse II	Richard Perryman	Walter Earl	2:05.20
1941	Orthodox	Doug Smith	Noel Cannon	2:07.60
	no race 1942-44
1945	Midas	Eph Smith	Jack Jarvis	2:07.80
1946	Radiotherapy	Tommy Carey	Fred Templeman	2:09.80
1947	Blue Train	Gordon Richards	Fred Darling	2:10.00
1948	Riding Mill	Charlie Smirke	Harry Wragg	2:08.00
1949	Faux Tirage	Gordon Richards	Noel Murless	2:10.40
1950	Prince Simon	Harry Carr	Cecil Boyd-Rochfort	2:11.80
1951	Crocodile	Neville Sellwood	Atty Persse	2:10.60
1952	Chavey Down	Harry Carr	Cecil Boyd-Rochfort	2:05.67
1953	Pinza	Gordon Richards	Norman Bertie	2:10.20
1954	Elopement	Gordon Richards	Noel Murless	2:09.17
1955	Acropolis	Doug Smith	George Colling	2:04.54
1956	Pirate King	Willie Snaith	Humphrey Cottrill	2:04.54
1957	Sun Charger	Lester Piggott	Noel Murless	2:26.67
1958	Guersillus	Eddie Hide	Charles Elsey	2:06.54
1959	Agricola	Manny Mercer	John Oxley	2:12.40
1960	Stupor Mundi	Harry Carr	Cecil Boyd-Rochfort	2:18.39
1961	The Axe	Harry Carr	Cecil Boyd-Rochfort	2:07.80
Race not held from 1962 to 1977
1978	Shirley Heights	Greville Starkey	John Dunlop	2:11.99
1979	Masked Marvel	Joe Mercer	Henry Cecil	2:11.33
1980	Royal Fountain	Paul Cook	Luca Cumani	2:10.30
1981	Shotgun	Jimmy Bleasdale	Chris Thornton	2:08.18
1982	Mr Fluorocarbon	Lester Piggott	Henry Cecil	2:09.56
1983	Shearwalk	Walter Swinburn	Michael Stoute	2:09.88
1984	Claude Monet	Steve Cauthen	Henry Cecil	2:05.50
1985	Slip Anchor	Steve Cauthen	Henry Cecil	2:02.98
1986	Verd-Antique	Steve Cauthen	Henry Cecil	2:08.15
1987	Genghiz	Tony Ives	Lester Piggott	2:06.14
1988	Minster Son	Willie Carson	Dick Hern	2:09.66
1989	Prince of Dance	Willie Carson	Dick Hern	2:03.85
1990	Theatrical Charmer	Pat Eddery	Alex Scott	2:06.67
1991	Walim	Pat Eddery	Michael Stoute	2:05.55
1992	Captain Horatius	Willie Carson	John Dunlop	2:05.13
1993	Tenby	Pat Eddery	Henry Cecil	2:05.15
1994	Alriffa	John Reid	Richard Hannon Sr.	2:02.38
1995	Presenting	Frankie Dettori	John Gosden	2:02.12
1996	Mick's Love	Frankie Dettori	Saeed bin Suroor	2:05.50
1997	Sandstone	Pat Eddery	John Dunlop	2:05.23
1998	Dr Fong	Kieren Fallon	Henry Cecil	2:11.87
1999	Beat All	Pat Eddery	Sir Michael Stoute	2:01.89
2000	Beat Hollow	Richard Quinn	Henry Cecil	2:06.63
2001	Rosi's Boy	Pat Eddery	John Dunlop	2:08.18
2002	Highdown	Martin Dwyer	Marcus Tregoning	2:04.90
2003	Delsarte	Keith Dalgleish	Mark Johnston	2:09.12
2004	Hazyview	Darryll Holland	Neville Callaghan	2:05.38
2005	Rocamadour	Frankie Dettori	Mick Channon	2:03.36
2006	Mulaqat	Martin Dwyer	Marcus Tregoning	2:04.79
2007	Salford Mill (Note: The 2007 winner Salford Mill was later exported to Hong Kong and renamed Helene Mascot)	Kerrin McEvoy	David Elsworth	2:03.15
2008	Kandahar Run	Ted Durcan	Henry Cecil	2:10.54
2009	Your Old Pal (Note: The 2009 winner Your Old Pal subsequently raced in Hong Kong as Ride with the Wind)	Shane Kelly	Jeremy Noseda	2:04.91
2010	Gardening Leave (Note: The 2010 winner Gardening Leave went on to race in Hong Kong as Treasure Lands)	Jimmy Fortune	Andrew Balding	2:05.69
2011	Ocean War	Mickael Barzalona	Mahmood Al Zarooni	2:07.08
2012	Noble Mission	Tom Queally	Sir Henry Cecil	2:11.45
2013	Windhoek	Joe Fanning	Mark Johnston	2:05.35
2014	Barley Mow (Note: The 2014 winner Barley Mow went on to race in Hong Kong as Helene Happy Star)	Richard Hughes	Richard Hannon Jr.	2:04.89
2015	Best Of Times	James Doyle	Saeed bin Suroor	2:05.76
2016	Hawkbill	William Buick	Charlie Appleby	2:04.82
2017	Permian	Ryan Moore	Mark Johnston	2:03.66
2018	Key Victory	William Buick	Charlie Appleby	2:05.30
2019	UAE Jewel	David Egan	Roger Varian	2:06.02
2020 (Note: The 2020 race was run in June, due to the COVID-19 pandemic in the United Kingdom)	Mishriff	David Egan	John Gosden	2:00.85
2021	Mohaafeth	Jim Crowley	William Haggas	2:04.74
2022	Nations Pride	William Buick	Charlie Appleby	2:05.73
2023	Castle Way	William Buick	Charlie Appleby	2:04.66
2024	Caviar Heights	Clifford Lee	Karl Burke	2:02.88
2025	Alpine Trail	William Buick	Charlie Appleby	2:05.24
2026	Ancient Egypt	Rowan Scott	Charlie Johnston	2:03.80

== Earlier winners ==
=== First Spring version ===
The original version of the race was held at Newmarket's First Spring Meeting in late April or early May.

- 1804: Prospero
- 1805: Lydia
- 1806: Achilles
- 1807: Musician
- 1808: Morel
- 1809: Thunderbolt
- 1810: Whalebone
- 1811: Trophonius
- 1812: Pointers
- 1813: Smolensko
- 1814: Blucher
- 1815: Busto
- 1816: Alien
- 1817: Gazelle
- 1818: Roger Bacon
- 1819: Tiresias
- 1820: Ivanhoe
- 1821: Gustavus
- 1822: Mystic
- 1823: Nicoli
- 1824: Serab
- 1825: Crockery
- 1826: Goshawk
- 1827: Serenade
- 1828: Zinganee
- 1829: Patron
- 1830: Augustus
- 1831: Riddlesworth
- 1832: Mixbury
- 1833: Forester
- 1835: Bodice
- 1836: Muezzin
- 1837: Rat-Trap
- 1838: Boeotian
- 1839: Montreal
- 1840: Scutari
- 1841: John o' Gaunt
- 1842: Canadian
- 1843: Evenus
- 1845: Idas
- 1846: Pyrrhus the First
- 1847: Cossack
- 1848: Glendower
- 1849: Vatican
- 1850: Cariboo
- 1851: Midas
- 1852: Stockwell
- 1853: Orinoco
- 1855: De Clare
- 1856: Wentworth
- 1857: Glee-Singer
- 1858: Beadsman / Eclipse *
- 1859: Phantom
- 1860: St Albans
- 1861: Russley
- 1862: Canwell
- 1863: Mogador
- 1864: Claremont
- 1866: Robin Hood
- 1867: Marksman
- 1868: The Earl
- 1869: Strathnairn
- 1870: Nobleman
- 1871: King William
- 1872: Cremorne
- 1873: Andred
- 1874: George Frederick
- 1876: Skylark
- 1877: King Clovis
- 1878: Reefer
- 1879: Muley Edris
- 1880: Merry-Go-Round
- 1881: Iroquois
- 1882: Milord
- 1883: Merrimac
- 1885: Palladio
- 1886: Lisbon
- 1887: declared void

* The 1858 race was a dead-heat and has joint winners.

=== Second Spring version ===
The next version was held at Newmarket's Second Spring Meeting in mid-May.

- 1889: Donovan
- 1890: Memoir
- 1891: Mimi
- 1892: Curio
- 1893: Isinglass
- 1894: Ladas
- 1895: The Owl
- 1896: Galeazzo
- 1897: Galtee More
- 1898: Cyllene
- 1899: Dominie

== See also ==
- Horse racing in Great Britain
- List of British flat horse races
