= Eleanor (horse) =

British Thoroughbred racehorse

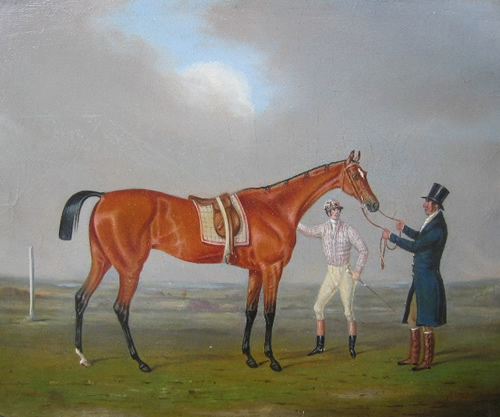
- Eleanor, c. 1801, in a painting by Richard Denew
- Sire: Whiskey
- Grandsire: Saltram
- Dam: Young Giantess
- Damsire: Diomed
- Sex: Mare
- Foaled: 1798
- Country: Kingdom of Great Britain
- Colour: Bay
- Breeder: Charles Bunbury
- Owner: 1) Charles Bunbury (1798–1821); 2) Mr. Rush (1822–c.1824)
- Trainer: Cox or J. Frost
- Record: 46: 29-8-1

Major wins
- Epsom Derby (1801); Epsom Oaks (1801)

Eleanor (1798 – c. 1824) was a British Thoroughbred racehorse bred by Charles Bunbury and was the first female horse to win The Derby. Eleanor also won the 1801 Epsom Oaks among many other races before retiring from racing at age eight to become a broodmare for Bunbury. She produced the stallion Muley, which in turn sired the mare Marpessa (dam of Pocahontas and grandam of Stockwell) and the influential stallion Leviathan which was exported to the United States in the early nineteenth century. Through the produce of her daughter Active (the grandam of Woodburn), Eleanor is present in the pedigrees of 19th-century American Standardbred racehorses.

== Background ==
Eleanor was foaled in 1798 at Barton Hall near Bury St. Edmunds, the ancestral home of her breeder Charles Bunbury. She was a bay filly with a small white star and a sock on her left hind foot. Bunbury purchased Eleanor's sire Whiskey in 1793 after his racing career. Whiskey was foaled in 1789 and was bred by the Prince of Wales. He won several sweepstakes over his racing career and raced until he was four years old.

Her dam, Young Giantess (foaled in 1790), was sired by Diomed, the winner of the first Epsom Derby and also owned by Bunbury, out of the mare Giantess. Giantess (foaled in 1769) was bred by Viscount Bolingbroke and had raced with success prior to being purchased as a broodmare by Bunbury, winning three races in eight starts. Young Giantess raced a few times, but was not successful on the turf. Retired to stud in 1794, Young Giantess was an exceptional broodmare and produced the influential stallion Sorcerer in 1796 during her first few seasons at stud when bred to Trumpetor. Eleanor was Young Giantess' third foal, and she also produced seven full-siblings to Eleanor: Julia (the dam of 1811 Derby winner Phantom, the sire of Middleton and Cedric), Cressida (the dam of 1830 Derby winner Priam), Lydia (dam of Corporal), Clarissa, Leonardo, Fair Star and Young Whiskey. Young Giantess died in 1811 while attempting to foal twins by Giles.

== Racing career ==
Eleanor did not race as a two-year-old. She was owned by Charles Bunbury throughout her four-year racing career and won 29 out of her 48 starts. Her training has been attributed to a man named Cox or J. Frost. The death of Cox (or alternatively Frost) is associated with a death-bed anecdote about Eleanor's racing prowess where the dying man exclaims to a clergyman, "Depend upon it, that Eleanor is a h—l of a mare!" As a three-year-old in 1801, she became the first filly to win The Derby and also secured The Oaks that year, a feat that would not be repeated until 56 years later when Blink Bonny won both races in 1857. She is the first of only six fillies to win the Epsom Derby, and only four fillies have won the Epsom Oaks and the Derby. Her principal jockey for most of her career was John Saunders. Eleanor retired from racing at age seven and returned to Barton Hall as a broodmare for Bunbury.

=== 1801: three-year-old season ===
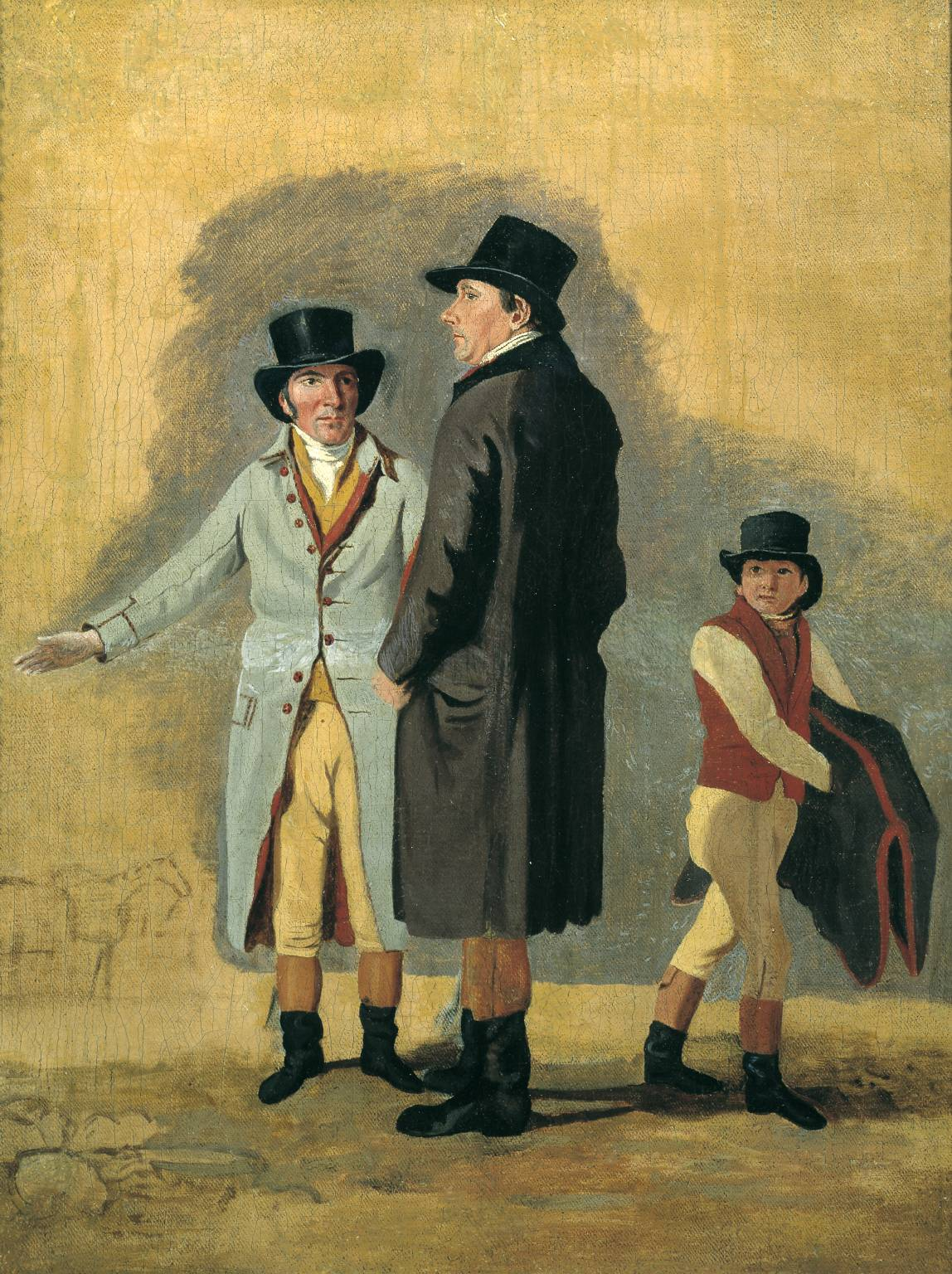
Eleanor's trainer (either Cox or Frost; left) with her owner Charles Bunbury and a stable boy in an artist's study by Benjamin Marshall, c. 1801

Eleanor's first race occurred on 20 April in Newmarket at the First Spring meeting where she beat the filly Miss Fuery and won 250 guineas. The Epsom Derby, held on 21 May, was her second career start, which she won against 9 colts and one other filly while carrying 110 pounds. A colt by Fidget (owned by Lord Egremont) was second and the Duke of Grafton's filly Remnant sired by Trumpetor was third. On the day after the Derby, Eleanor won the 550-guinea Epsom Oaks from Lord Grosvenor's filly Rosamond and four other horses. At Ascot, she finished second in a 215-guinea sweepstakes to a colt sired by Asparagus (later named Teddy the Grinder) while carrying 7 pounds more weight than the other racers as a handicap for her wins in the Derby and the Oaks. At the First October meeting in Newmarket, Eleanor won 700 guineas in a match race with Miss Fuery. In her last engagement of the season, Eleanor beat the Duke of Grafton's colt Flambeau in a 200-guinea match race.

=== 1802: four-year-old season ===
In her first start as a four-year-old in spring 1802 at Newmarket, Eleanor finished last in a field of four horses to Lord Darlington's horse Muly-Moloch. At the First October meeting in Newmarket, Eleanor regained her three-year-old form and defeated the mare Penelope, winning 350 guineas. She also won the King's Plate from Sister to Gouty a few days later. At the Second October meeting at Newmarket, her last engagement of the season, Eleanor won £50 in a stakes race by beating the Prince of Wales' horse Shock.

=== 1803: five-year-old season ===
At the Newmarket-Craven meeting, Eleanor received 200 guineas from Mr. Sitwell after his horse Fieldfare forfeited a three-mile match race. At the same meeting Eleanor ran third to Sir Hedworth Williamson's horse Walton in the Oatlands Stakes. At the First Spring meeting in Newmarket, she was second in the King's Plate to Lord Sackville's horse Dick Andrews (later the sire of Eleanor's 1814 filly foal). At Ipswich, Eleanor won £50 in a two-mile race. At Oxford, Eleanor beat her sister Julia to win The Cup and won £50 in three-mile heat races. At Huntingdon she won two £50 races, beating the colt Pipylin in one race. She beat the filly Primrose for the Lincoln King's Plate. She was beaten by Penelope at the Second October meeting at Newmarket in 375-guinea sweepstake race. She ran twice more in 1803 but did not place in either start.

=== 1804: six-year-old season ===
On 2 April at the Newmarket Craven meeting, Eleanor finished third in the Craven Stakes to the mare Aniseed and the colt Walton. She finished second to Penelope for the 100-guinea King's Plate at the First Spring meeting at Newmarket on 17 April. At the same meeting a few days later, Eleanor won the Subscription Handicap Plate of £50, beating Rebel and Chippingham. On 3 May during the Second Spring meeting at Newmarket, Eleanor received 40 guineas from Mr. Mellish after his filly Surprise forfeited a match race. Ten days later at Brocket Hall, Eleanor lost a 100-guinea Gold Cup race to Mr. Dawson's horse Quiz. She won the £50 Town Plate at Ipswich on 5 July against a filly sired by Pot-8-Os. Six days later at the July Meeting at Newmarket, Eleanor won a £50 race against four other younger horses, beating the Duke of Queensberry's three-year-old colt Moorcock. At Chelmsford on 25 July, she won a £50 match race against Mr. Golding's three-year-old filly Coaxer. At Huntingdon on 8 August, Eleanor won a match race against the four-year-old filly Capella. On 13 September at Bedford, she received £20 after being the only horse entered in a £50 race (termed as "a walk over"). Eleanor finished third in a subscription race to Sir Harry Dimsdale and Penelope at the First October meeting at Newmarket. At the same meeting on 4 October, she won an 80-guinea gold cup, beating Virtuosa and Lignum Vitae. At the Second October Meeting at Newmarket, Eleanor beat Orville (later the sire of her 1810 colt Muley) in a 375-guinea subscription race. She was beaten by Mr. Mellish's horse Eagle (full brother to Spread Eagle) in a Halloween match race at the Newmarket-Houghton Meeting.

=== 1805: seven-year-old season ===
Eleanor won three races at the Egham meeting. She beat Miss Coiner for The Cup, won £50 in a race by beating her previous rival Quiz and beat the colt Young Woodpecker for 100 guineas. At the First October meeting at Newmarket, Eleanor beat Lord Foley's colt Czar Peter. At the Second October meeting, she was second to Bustard in a gold cup race. At the Houghton meeting, she was again second in a gold cup race to the horse Stretch. In the last three starts of her career, Eleanor did not place.

== Stud career ==
Eleanor was retired to stud in 1806 at Bunbury's Barton Hall. Charles Bunbury died in March 1821 and all the horses at Barton Hall were auctioned in the spring of 1822, where Eleanor (listed as "Ellinor") was sold for just over £91. Eleanor's exact date of death was not reported in the General Stud Book and no foaling entries or breeding attempts are recorded for her after 1823, indicating that she most likely died after foaling in 1823 or 1824.

=== Full list of offspring ===
Eleanor produced ten foals between 1807 and 1823. Of Eleanor's offspring, her best son was the colt Muley. Muley and Eleanor's other offspring were mediocre racehorses, but Muley and a few of her daughters did produce good racehorses. The General Stud Book lists the breeder of her 1817 colt as Mr. Udny, Sir G. Pigot as the breeder of her 1820 filly and Mr. Rush as the breeder of her last foal in 1823. Her full list of offspring includes:

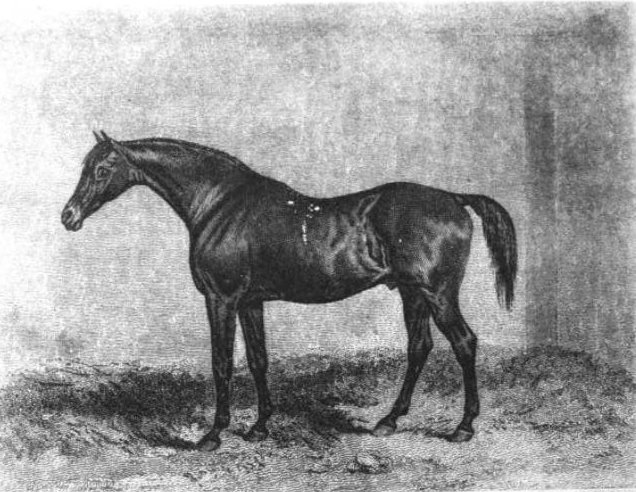
Muley: Eleanor's bay 1810 colt sired by Orville and her most notable son. Muley became a successful sire of racehorses and broodmares in the 1820s and 1830s.

- Nell (1807), bay filly sired by Johnny.
- Chestnut filly (1809) sired by Giles. This filly died before two years old and never raced.
- Muley (1810), bay colt sired by Orville. Muley raced only as a five-year-old in 1815, winning two races out of four starts. He was retired to stud at Blickling Hall in 1816 and produced many good racers including Margrave, Vespa and Little Wonder. His most important contribution to Thoroughbred genetics is through his daughter Marpessa (foaled in 1830 out of the mare Clare) whose first foal was the important broodmare Pocahontas, the dam of Stockwell. Muley also produced Leviathan, a leading sire in United States in the early nineteenth century.
- Troilus (1811), bay colt sired by Walton.
- Black colt (1813) sired by Thunderbolt.
- Bay filly (1814) sired by Dick Andrews. This mare was never officially named in England, but did produce Picton in 1819 when bred to the Epsom Derby winner Smolensko and was thereafter colloquially referred to as "Picton's dam." Picton was a successful racehorse, winning 14 minor races in his career, but was unsuccessful as a sire. Her 1820 foal, Luzborough, became a significant sire in the United States. She was relocated to France in 1821 and was named Eleonor. She produced seven foals in France and produced the good racer Ganges in 1831 when she was moved back to England.
- Barren to Ashton (1815)
- Foal (1816) sired by Haphazard.
- Bay colt (1817) sired by Haphazard. This colt was sent to India in 1821.
- Active (1820), bay filly sired by Partisan. Active was bred to George Pigot and foaled the filly Heads or Tails in 1831. Heads or Tails was exported to the United States in 1839 and became an influential American broodmare, being the grandam of Hester (dam of Springbok) and Woodburn. Woodburn was used primarily as a sire of trotting horses, the basis of the Standardbred breed.
- Barren to Merlin (1822).
- Aunt Anne (1823), bay filly sired by Pioneer. Aunt Anne was an unsuccessful broodmare in England and was sold to the Swedish government in July 1831. She was named My Aunt Nan in Sweden.

== Pedigree ==
Pedigree of Eleanor (GB), Bay 1798
Sire Whiskey Bay 1789	Saltram; 1780	Eclipse	Marske
Sire Whiskey Bay 1789	Saltram; 1780	Eclipse	Spilletta
Sire Whiskey Bay 1789	Saltram; 1780	Virago	Snap
Sire Whiskey Bay 1789	Saltram; 1780	Virago	Regulus Mare
Sire Whiskey Bay 1789	Calash; 1775	Herod*	Tartar
Sire Whiskey Bay 1789	Calash; 1775	Herod*	Cypron
Sire Whiskey Bay 1789	Calash; 1775	Teresa	Matchem*
Sire Whiskey Bay 1789	Calash; 1775	Teresa	Brown Regulus
Dam Young Giantess Bay 1790	Diomed; 1777	Florizel	Herod*
Dam Young Giantess Bay 1790	Diomed; 1777	Florizel	Cygnet Mare
Dam Young Giantess Bay 1790	Diomed; 1777	Sister to Juno	Spectator
Dam Young Giantess Bay 1790	Diomed; 1777	Sister to Juno	Horatia
Dam Young Giantess Bay 1790	Giantess; 1769	Matchem*	Cade
Dam Young Giantess Bay 1790	Giantess; 1769	Matchem*	Sister to Miss Partner
Dam Young Giantess Bay 1790	Giantess; 1769	Molly Longlegs	Babraham
Dam Young Giantess Bay 1790	Giantess; 1769	Molly Longlegs	Foxhunter Mare

* Eleanor is inbred 3S x 4D to the stallion Herod, meaning that he appears third generation on the sire side of her pedigree and fourth generation on the dam side of her pedigree.

* Eleanor is inbred 4S x 3D to the stallion Matchem, meaning that he appears fourth generation on the sire side of his pedigree and third generation on the dam side of his pedigree.
