= Matchem =

British Thoroughbred racehorse

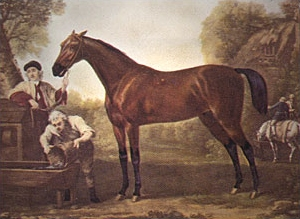
- Matchem
- Sire: Cade
- Grandsire: Godolphin Arabian
- Dam: Sister to Miss Partner (1735)
- Damsire: Partner
- Sex: Stallion
- Foaled: 1748
- Country: Great Britain
- Colour: Bay
- Breeder: John Holmes
- Owner: William Fenwick
- Record: 12: 10-2-0

Major wins
- 5yo Great Subscription Purse (1753)

Awards
- Leading sire in Great Britain and Ireland (1772, 1773, 1774)
- Last updated on 19 July 2011

Matchem (1748 – 21 February 1781), sometimes styled as Match 'em, was a Thoroughbred racehorse who had a great influence on the breed, and was the earliest of three 18th-century stallions that produced the Thoroughbred sire-lines of today, in addition to Eclipse and Herod. He was the Leading sire in Great Britain and Ireland from 1772 - 1774.

== Breeding ==
Bred by John Holmes of Carlisle, he was sired by Cade, a stallion who also got Changeling—the sire of Le Sang, and the grandsire to Bourbon (winner of the St. Leger) and Duchess (winner of the Doncaster Cup)—and Young Cade (who sired many good broodmares). He won many King's Plates in his racing career. Cade was by the Godolphin Arabian, one of the three founding stallions of the Thoroughbred breed.

Matchem was out of a bay (1735) mare by Partner, who was an undefeated stallion in 1723, 1724, and 1726 in four-mile match races, until his first loss in 1728 to Smiling Ball. Partner also sired Tartar, the sire of Herod. Matchem's dam was also full-sister to Miss Partner.

== Description ==
The colt was surprisingly small, only 14 hands 3 inches with good bone and a "racey" build. Although considered dark bay, he produced a great number of chestnuts and a high percentage of blacks, as well as horses listed as roan out of non-roan mares, suggesting he might have carried the rabicano gene. His sire was also noted to have sired a good number of roans. Additionally, he had "Matchem arms," or 2-3 bars of white hair at the base of the tail.

== Racing career ==
Sold to William Fenwick, Matchem lived at his stud in Bywell in Northumberland until the age of five before beginning his racing career. This practice, to wait until the horse was fully mature, was customary at that time, despite the fact that most racehorses today begin their careers at two or three. In 1753, Matchem won his maiden race, the Great Subscription Purse at York, ridden by Christopher Jackson, as well as a plate in Morpeth, Northumberland. The following year, he won the four-mile Ladies' Plate at York, the Ladies' Plate at Lincoln, and again a plate at Morpeth.

At age seven, he beat Trajan at the four-mile Beacon course at Newmarket, finishing in only 7 minutes, 20 seconds. To solidify the victory, Matchem again beat Trajan in The Whip in April, over the Beacon course. He then won a plate at Newcastle, before experiencing his first loss to Spectator, in the Jockey Club Plate (Newmarket). Due to physical problems, Matchem did not race until the 1758 Jockey Club Plate, which he lost to Mirza. He then finished his career with a win against Foxhunter at Scarborough.

=== Summary ===
Date	Race name	Dist (miles)	Course	Prize	Jockey	Odds	Runners	Pos	Opponents
Aug 1753	Great Subscription Purse	4	York	£160 5s	Christopher Jackson	1/2	3	1	Barforth Billy; Bold
1753	not known	not known	Morpeth (Note: Whyte's History of the British Turf specifies these races took place in Norfolk not Morpeth)	£50	not known	not known	not known	1	Blameless
1754	Ladies' Plate	4	York	126 gs	not known	not known	not known	1	not known
1754	Ladies' Plate	not known	Lincoln	£80	not known	not known	not known	1	not known
1754	Unnamed race	not known	Morpeth	£50	none	not known	walkover	1	walkover
Apr 1755	Unnamed race	4m 1.5f	Newmarket	£50	not known	£4/£5 6s	4	1	Trajan; two others
Aug 1755	Open race	not known	York	£20	none	none	no entries	1	none
Apr 1756	Match race	4 m 1.5f	Newmarket	200 gs	John Singleton	1/2	2	1	Trajan
Apr 1756	Jockey Club Plate	not known	Newmarket	not known	not known	2/1 first heat	6	3	Spectator; Brilliant; Whistlejacket; Sweepstakes; Crab
1756	Unnamed race	not known	Newcastle	60 gs	not known	not known	3	1	Drawcansir; Full Moon
Apr 1758	Jockey Club Plate	not known	Newmarket	not known	not known	10/1	5	2	Mirza (1st); Jason (3rd); Feather (4th); Forrester (5th)
Sep 1758	Unnamed race	not known	Scarborough	£50	not known	10/1	3	1	Foxhunter; Sweetlips

== Breeding career ==
Matchem began his breeding career in 1758, although he would not retire from his career on the turf until the following year. He stood his entire career at Bywell, until his death 21 February 1781, at age 33. His many offspring, including 354 winners of £151,097, were noted for their good temperaments. Some of his best get include:

- Conductor: 1767 chestnut colt, out of a Snap mare, won 10 races and sired Trumpator (sire of Sorcerer) and Imperator. Passed the Godolphin Arabian's male line onward, making him the most important breeding son of Matchem.
- Hollandaise: 1775 gray filly, winner of the St. Leger.
- Tetotum: 1777 bay filly, winner of the Oaks.
- Pumpkin: 1769 chestnut colt, best racing son of Matchem, won a 1,000 guineas match against Firetail and a 500 guineas match against brother Conductor, among others.
- Turf: 1760 bay colt, most well known as the sire to an unnamed filly who was dam to the influential Messenger. Messenger became a foundation sire for the Standardbred breed, also important to the Tennessee Walking Horse breed, and sired the filly Miller's Damsel, dam to American Eclipse.

In prize money terms his career peaked in 1772, when he sired 30 winners of £25,116 10s. The following year was his peak in terms of number of winners - 40 for £16,397 10s prize money.

== Sire line tree ==
- Matchem
  - Turf
    - Crop
      - Lop
        - Woodman
    - Acacia
  - Dux
    - Yellow Jack
      - Jacks Maidenhead
  - Conductor
    - Imperator
      - Pipator
        - Takahama
        - Remembrancer
        - Tom Wheatley
    - Trumpator
      - Paynator
        - Dyke
        - Dr Syntax
      - Didelot
      - Sorcerer
        - Thunderbolt
        - Wizard
        - Soothsayer
        - Trophonius
        - Truffle
        - Comus
        - Smolensko
        - Bourbon
        - Clavelino
      - Governor
        - William
    - Harpator
  - Pantaloon
    - Buffer
    - Harry Rowe
    - John Doe
  - North Star
    - North Star
  - Johnny
  - Pumpkin
    - Young Pumpkin
  - Alfred
    - Doctor
    - Guyler
    - Shipton
    - Tickle Toby
  - Protector
  - Dictator
  - Magnum Bonum
    - Rattler
      - Rattler
        - Young Rattler
          - Imperieux
            - Voltaire
              - Kapirat
                - Conquérant
          - Xerxus
            - Ganymede
              - Quebec
                - Divus
                  - Normand
  - Magog
    - Forester

== Bibliography ==
- Whyte, James Christie (1840). History of the British Turf, from the earliest period to the present day, Volume I. London: H. Colburn. OL 6544990M.
