= Cara (horse) =

British-bred Thoroughbred racehorse

- Sire: Belshazzar
- Grandsire: Blacklock
- Dam: Fanchon
- Damsire: Whalebone
- Sex: Mare
- Foaled: 1836
- Country: United Kingdom
- Colour: Bay
- Breeder: Richard Watt
- Owner: Richard Watt
- Trainer: Charles Marson
- Record: 6: 2-0-1

Major wins
- Criterion Stakes (1838); 1000 Guineas (1839)

Cara (1836–1857) was a British Thoroughbred racehorse and broodmare who won the classic 1000 Guineas at Newmarket Racecourse in 1839. The filly was lightly campaigned, running six races in three seasons and winning twice. She was one of the leading British two-year-olds of 1838, winning the Criterion Stakes in impressive fashion and won the 1000 Guineas the following spring. Cara failed to reproduce her early success, being beaten in two races at Newmarket later that year and finishing last on her only start as a four-year-old. She was then retired to stud and died in 1857, having made little impact as a broodmare.

== Background ==
Cara was a bay mare bred by her owner Richard Watt of Bishop Burton near Beverley in Yorkshire. She was sired by Watt's stallion Belshazzar, who won several important races at York and Doncaster Racecourse and had some success at stud before being sold to Thomas Flintoff and exported to Tennessee.

Cara's dam, Fanchon was bred by Lord Egremont and was a sister of The Derby winners Lap-dog and Spaniel: Cara was her second foal.

== Racing career ==
=== 1838: two-year-old season ===
Cara began her racing career at the July meeting at Newmarket where she ran in the Chesterfield Stakes, a race for two-year-old colts and fillies. Cara was not among the favourites for the race over the last half of the Bunbury Mile course and finished unplaced behind Mr Ford's filly Minima.

The filly missed the next three months before returning on 29 October at the Newmarket Houghton meeting where she was made the 5/2 for the Criterion Stakes. The event was one of the most important two-year-old races of the season, and the field included the July Stakes winner Bulwark and the filly Reel, winner of the Clearwell Stakes. Ridden by George Edwards she was among the leaders from the start and "won easy" from the Duke of Portland's colt Vale of Belvoir and fifteen others. At the end of the year, Cara was described as "the most brilliant performer" among the season's British two-year-olds.

=== 1839: three-year-old season ===
On 18 April 1839 Cara was one of only five fillies, from an original entry of twenty-three, to contest the 1000 Guineas Stakes over Newmarket's Ditch Mile course. She started the second choice of the bettors, at odds of 7/4, with the Duke of Portland's Cænis being made 6/5 favourite after winning the Column Produce Stakes at the Craven meeting. Ridden by George Edwards, Cara won from Cænis, with Alexandrina in third place. Despite Cara winning easily, the race made little impact on the betting for the Oaks as she had never been entered for the race.

Cara did not race again for five and a half months, reappearing at the First October meeting. In the Newmarket St Leger over the two mile "Ditch-In" course she finished third behind the Duke of Grafton's colts Montreal and Æther. The filly's performance led the New Sporting Magazine to speculate that she was not entirely "honest". At the end of the month at the Newmarket Houghton meeting Cara contested the inaugural running of the Cambridgeshire Handicap. She carried a weight of 107 pounds, the fourth highest of the twelve runners, and finished unplaced behind the four-year-old Lanercost.

=== 1840: four-year-old season ===
Cara stayed in training as a four-year-old but did not appear on the racecourse until the Second October meeting at Newmarket. She ran in a £50 weight-for-age race over ten furlongs in which she finished last of the four runners behind Janus, a three-year-old colt owned by Lord Albemarle.

== Stud record ==
Cara was retired from racing to become a broodmare. She died in early 1857 before producing a foal.

== Pedigree ==
Pedigree of Cara (GB), bay mare, 1836
Sire Belshazzar (GB) 1830	Blacklock; 1814	Whitelock	Hambletonian
Sire Belshazzar (GB) 1830	Blacklock; 1814	Whitelock	Rosalind
Sire Belshazzar (GB) 1830	Blacklock; 1814	Coriander mare	Coriander
Sire Belshazzar (GB) 1830	Blacklock; 1814	Coriander mare	Wildgoose
Sire Belshazzar (GB) 1830	Manuella; 1809	Dick Andrews	Joe Andrews
Sire Belshazzar (GB) 1830	Manuella; 1809	Dick Andrews	Highflyer mare
Sire Belshazzar (GB) 1830	Manuella; 1809	Mandane	Potoooooooo
Sire Belshazzar (GB) 1830	Manuella; 1809	Mandane	Young Camilla
Dam Fanchon (GB) 1827	Whalebone; 1823	Waxy	Potoooooooo
Dam Fanchon (GB) 1827	Whalebone; 1823	Waxy	Maria
Dam Fanchon (GB) 1827	Whalebone; 1823	Penelope	Trumpator
Dam Fanchon (GB) 1827	Whalebone; 1823	Penelope	Prunella
Dam Fanchon (GB) 1827	Canopus mare 1829	Canopus	Gohanna
Dam Fanchon (GB) 1827	Canopus mare 1829	Canopus	Colibri
Dam Fanchon (GB) 1827	Canopus mare 1829	Young Woodpecker mare	Young Woodpecker
Dam Fanchon (GB) 1827	Canopus mare 1829	Young Woodpecker mare	Fractious (Family:3)
