= Camel (horse) =

British-bred Thoroughbred racehorse

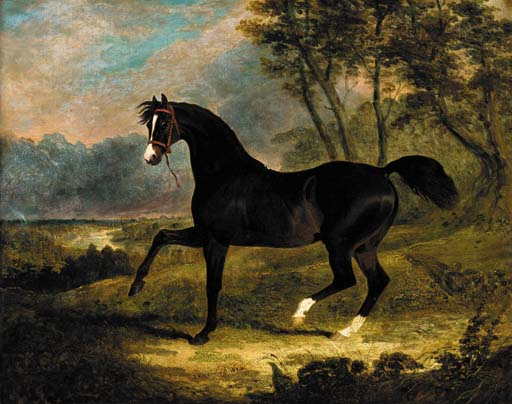
- Camel, by John Frederick Herring Sr. (1843)
- Sire: Whalebone
- Grandsire: Waxy
- Dam: Selim mare
- Damsire: Selim
- Sex: Stallion
- Foaled: 1822
- Country: Great Britain
- Colour: Brown
- Breeder: 3rd Earl of Egremont
- Owner: Hon Charles Wyndham
- Record: 7: 5-2-0

Major wins
- One-third Subscription of 25 sov (1825); Match against Tarandus (1825); Port Stakes (1826); Match against Redgauntlet (1827)

Awards
- Leading sire in Great Britain and Ireland (1838)

Camel (1822 – 6 November 1844) was a British Thoroughbred racehorse. He won five of his seven races, including the Port Stakes in 1825, but his appearances were limited by leg problems. Throughout his racing career he was owned by Charles Wyndham. After retiring from racing Camel became a successful stallion, siring St. Leger winners Touchstone and Launcelot and becoming British Champion sire in 1838.

== Background ==
Camel was a brown colt bred by George Wyndham, 3rd Earl of Egremont, and foaled in 1822. He was sired by Whalebone, who won the Newmarket Stakes and Epsom Derby in 1834. After retiring from racing he was a successful stallion, becoming Champion sire twice. Amongst his other progeny were Derby winners Lap-dog and Spaniel, as well as the top sire Sir Hercules. Camel's dam was an unnamed daughter of Selim. Camel was owned by Egremont's son Charles Wyndham.

== Racing career ==
Camel was due to race the colt Peter Proteus in a match race at Newmarket on 21 April 1825, but Peter Proteus paid a forfeit and was withdrawn. They following day he contested the Newmarket Stakes, facing eight rivals. Cramer was the pre-race favourite at 6/4, with Camel second favourite at 3/1. The race was won by 17/1 outsider Crockery, with Camel finishing second. On 3 May he started as the 5/4 favourite for a £50 race for three-year-olds over the Rowley Mile at Newmarket. Ridden by W. Arnull, Camel won the race from Adeliza. At Newmarket's Second October meeting he beat Dahlia, Mortgage and 1000 Guineas winner Tontine in a race for one-third of a subscription of 25 sovereigns each. At the beginning of November he beat Tarandus in a match race over 5 1/2 furlongs at Newmarket. Two days later Camel lost a match against the filly Scandel.

Camel only raced once in 1826, when he started as the 7/4 favourite for the Port Stakes at Newmarket. Ridden as usual by Arnull, he won the race from Redgauntlet, with Lionel Lincoln finishing in third place. Two others finished behind Lionel Lincoln, but were not placed by the judge. He was scheduled to run in the Garden Stakes in October, but was withdrawn from the race, which was won by Bizarre. He raced only once again in 1827, after suffering with leg problems since his win in the Port Stakes. This was at Newmarket in October, where he beat Redgauntlet easily by two lengths over one mile.

== Stud career ==
Camel initially stood as a stallion at Earl Grosvenor's Eaton Stud near Chester. In 1830 he stood for a fee of ten guineas and half a guinea for the groom. He became a successful stallion and was the leading sire in Great Britain and Ireland in 1838. His most important progeny were:

- Touchstone (1831) – won the St. Leger in 1834. He sired many classic winners, including Cotherstone, Orlando, Surplice and Newminster.
- Caravan (1834) – won the Ascot Gold Cup.
- Prism (1836) – foaled The Oaks winner Refraction.
- Black Bess (1837) – was the dam of 2000 Guineas winner Hernandez.
- Launcelot (1837) – won the St. Leger in 1840.
- Fiammetta (1838) – won the Poule d'Essai.
- Misdeal (1839) – won the St. James's Palace Stakes.

Camel died on 6 November 1844.

== Sire line tree ==
Descendants of Camel (click to show)
- Camel
  - Abbas Mirza
    - The Shah
      - Philip Shah
  - Caravan
    - Souvenir
  - Wintonian
  - Launcelot
  - Fiammetta
  - Simoom
    - Barbarian
  - Misdeal
  - Touchstone
    - Auckland
    - Cotherstone
      - Stilton
      - Speed The Plough
      - Pumicestone
      - Woodcote
      - Spencer
      - Glenmasson
        - Vestminster
    - Ithuriel
      - Longbow
        - Toxophilite
    - Orlando
      - Teddington
        - Shillelagh
        - Moulsey
      - King Pepin
      - Orpheus
      - Ninnyhammer
      - Orestes
        - Orest
      - Boiardo
        - Barwon
        - Banker
        - Oriflame
      - Marsyas
        - Albert Victor
        - George Frederick
      - Scythian
      - Duke Rollo
      - Fazzoletto
        - Ackworth
        - Blue Riband
        - King Victor
      - Porto Rico
      - King Of The Forest
      - The British Remedy
      - Chevalier d'Industrie
        - Friponnier
      - Claude Lorraine
      - Zuyder Zee
      - Eclipse
        - Throg's Neck Jr
        - Young Eclipse
        - Cambrist
        - Egotist
        - Boaster
        - Narragensett
        - Cavalier
        - Scathelock
        - Alarm
        - Catesby
        - Osseo
        - Grandmaster
      - Fitzroland
        - Paladin
      - Gin
      - Trumpeter
        - Salpinctes
        - Abergeldie
        - Distin
        - Queens Messenger
        - Plutus
        - Challenge
      - Crater
      - Canary
        - Xenophon
      - Diophantus
      - Wrestler
      - Chattanooga
        - Wellingtonia
      - Liddington
      - Temple
      - The Knave
    - Annandale
      - Balrownie
    - Paragone
    - Poynton
      - Peto
    - William Tell
      - Archer
    - Flatcatcher
    - Surplice
      - Florin
        - Florentin
    - Nunnykirk
      - Potocki
    - The Italian
    - Mountain Deer
      - Drogheda
      - Mount Zion
      - Roebuck
      - Croagh Patrick
    - Newminster
      - Daniel
      - Musjid
        - Leybourne
        - Wroughton
        - Islam
        - Vagabond
      - Newcastle
        - Charnwood
        - Sir Hugo
      - Joey Jones
      - Kildonan
      - Oldminster
      - Stanton
      - Adventurer
        - Argyle
        - Border Knight
        - Pretender
        - Enterprise
        - Dunois
        - Speculation
        - Chivalrous
        - Pirate
        - Blantyre
        - Schwindler
        - Glen Arthur
        - Militant
        - Ruperra
        - Sir Amyas Leigh
        - Bonnie Doon
        - Sportsman
        - Ishmael
        - Privateer
        - Borneo
      - Yorkminster
      - Lord Clifden
        - His Lordship
        - Falkenberg
        - Hawthornden
        - Moorlands
        - Barefoot
        - Buckden
        - Hymenaeus
        - Wenlock
        - Winslow
        - Hampton
        - Bay Windham
        - Petrarch
        - Kinsman
        - Cyprus
        - El Rey
        - King of Trumps
        - Lord Clive
        - Reefer
      - Meuzzin
      - Onesander
      - Pratique
      - Cambuscan
        - Botheration
        - Onslow
        - Cambuslang
        - Billesdon
        - Camballo
        - Cavaliero
        - Isolani
        - Frangepan
        - Cambus
        - Paszlor
      - Cathedral
        - Dalham
        - Organist
        - Clocher
        - El Plata
      - Midnight Mass
      - The Beadle
      - Bedminster
      - Heir-At-Law
      - Hurrah
        - Hermit
      - Laseretto
      - Victorious
        - Rosebach
      - Crown Prince
      - Laneret
      - Strathconan
        - Midlothian
        - Bishop Burton
        - Strathern
        - Buchanan
      - Vespasian
        - Bersaglier
        - Eastern Emperor
        - Blairgowrie
        - Touchstone
        - Greywing
        - Grey Gown
      - Hermit
        - Ascetic
        - Trappist
        - Ambergris
        - Gunnersbury
        - Peter
        - Retreat
        - St Louis
        - Tristan
        - Whipper-In
        - Cassock
        - St Blaise
        - Candlemas
        - Gamin
        - Gay Hermit
        - St Mirin
        - Timothy
        - Friars Balsam
        - Hazelhatch
        - Melanion
        - Heaume
        - Orbend
      - Kidderminster
      - Bogue Homa
      - Cardinal York
        - Havok
      - Conjuror
        - Juggler
    - Young Touchstone
    - Vindex
      - Victor
      - The Avenger
    - Claret
      - Scots Grey
    - Lord Of The Isles
      - Dundee
      - Scottish Chief
        - King Of The Forest
        - Childeric
        - Fitzjames
        - Glengarry
        - Merry Go Round
        - Napsbury
        - Orient
        - Pursebearer
        - Taurus
        - Kantaka
        - The Crofter
      - MacDonald
        - Gold Hill
    - Artillary
      - Revolver
        - Gamecock
      - Kyrle Daly
        - Herald
    - Lord Of The Hills
      - Glencoe
    - Tournament
      - Retrousse
      - Sabre
    - Wamba

== Pedigree ==
Pedigree of Camel, brown stallion, 1822
Sire Whalebone (GB) br. 1807	Waxy (GB) b. 1790	Potoooooooo ch. 1773	Eclipse*
Sire Whalebone (GB) br. 1807	Waxy (GB) b. 1790	Potoooooooo ch. 1773	Sportsmistress
Sire Whalebone (GB) br. 1807	Waxy (GB) b. 1790	Maria b. 1777	Herod*
Sire Whalebone (GB) br. 1807	Waxy (GB) b. 1790	Maria b. 1777	Lisette
Sire Whalebone (GB) br. 1807	Penelope (GB) b. 1798	Trumpator bl. 1782	Conductor
Sire Whalebone (GB) br. 1807	Penelope (GB) b. 1798	Trumpator bl. 1782	Brunette
Sire Whalebone (GB) br. 1807	Penelope (GB) b. 1798	Prunella b. 1788	Highflyer*
Sire Whalebone (GB) br. 1807	Penelope (GB) b. 1798	Prunella b. 1788	Promise
Dam Selim mare (GB) br. 1812	Selim (GB) ch. 1802	Buzzard ch. 1787	Woodpecker*
Dam Selim mare (GB) br. 1812	Selim (GB) ch. 1802	Buzzard ch. 1787	Misfortune
Dam Selim mare (GB) br. 1812	Selim (GB) ch. 1802	Alexander mare	Alexander*
Dam Selim mare (GB) br. 1812	Selim (GB) ch. 1802	Alexander mare	Highflyer mare
Dam Selim mare (GB) br. 1812	Maiden (GB) b. 1801	Sir Peter Teazle br. 1784	Highflyer*
Dam Selim mare (GB) br. 1812	Maiden (GB) b. 1801	Sir Peter Teazle br. 1784	Papillon
Dam Selim mare (GB) br. 1812	Maiden (GB) b. 1801	Phoenomenon mare ch. 1788	Phoenomenon
Dam Selim mare (GB) br. 1812	Maiden (GB) b. 1801	Phoenomenon mare ch. 1788	Matron

Note: b. = Bay, bl. = Black, br. = Brown, ch. = Chestnut

* Camel is inbred 4S x 5S x 5D x 5D x 5D to the stallion Herod, meaning that he appears fourth generation and fifth generation (via Highflyer) on the sire side of his pedigree, and fifth generation thrice (via Woodpecker, Highflyer, and Phoeomenon) on the dam side of his pedigree.

* Camel is inbred 4S x 4D to the stallion Highflyer, meaning that he appears fourth generation on the sire side of his pedigree, and fourth generation on the dam side of his pedigree.

* Camel is inbred 4S x 5D to the stallion Eclipse, meaning that he appears fourth generation on the sire side of his pedigree, and fifth generation (via Alexander) on the dam side of his pedigree.
