= Launcelot (horse) =

British-bred Thoroughbred racehorse

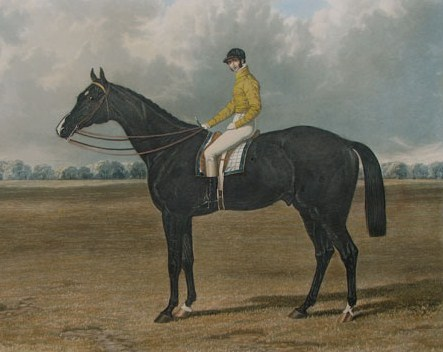
- Launcelot, Winner of The Great St Leger Stakes at Doncaster 1840 by John Frederick Herring
- Sire: Camel
- Grandsire: Whalebone
- Dam: Banter
- Damsire: Master Henry
- Sex: Stallion
- Foaled: 1837
- Country: United Kingdom
- Colour: Brown
- Breeder: Robert Grosvenor, 1st Marquess of Westminster
- Owner: Robert Grosvenor, 1st Marquess of Westminster
- Trainer: John Scott
- Record: 7: 4-2-0

Major wins
- Champagne Stakes (1839); Great St Leger Stakes (1840)

Launcelot (1837–1861) was a British Thoroughbred racehorse and sire best known for winning the classic St Leger Stakes in 1840. In a racing career which lasted from September 1839 until July 1841 he won four of his seven races although two of his victories came by way of walkover. As a two-year-old he proved himself to be one of the leading colts of his generation by winning the Champagne Stakes at Doncaster. In 1840 he started favourite for The Derby but was beaten by a 50/1 outsider Little Wonder. Later that year he recorded his most important victory when he defeated his stable companion Maroon in the St Leger. He was injured on his only appearance as a four-year-old and was retired to stud where he had little success as a sire of winners.

== Background ==
Launcelot was a brown colt with a white star and snip and two white feet bred by his owner Robert Grosvenor, 1st Marquess of Westminster. He was the seventh of seventeen foals produced by his owner's broodmare Banter (1826–1849). Her first foal had been Launcelot's full-brother, the outstanding racehorse Touchstone. Banter also produced Sarcasm, the dam of the 1841 St Leger winner Satirist.

Launcelot was sired by Camel, a horse who won the Port Stakes at Newmarket Racecourse before becoming a successful breeding stallion. Apart from Launcelot and Touchstone he sired the Ascot Gold Cup winner Caravan.

Lord Westminster sent the colt into training with John Scott who trained the winners of forty classic races at his base at Whitewall stables, Malton, North Yorkshire.

== Racing career ==
=== 1839: two-year-old season ===
Launcelot was scheduled to make his first appearance in the Hornby Stakes at York Racecourse on 21 August. All but one of the other horses entered were withdrawn, and when Launcelot's only remaining opponent failed to appear, Lord Westminster received a forfeit of 50 sovereigns. On 16 September the colt had his first competitive race in the Champagne Stakes at Doncaster's St Leger meeting in which he was ridden by his trainer's brother Bill Scott and started 5/4 favourite. He started poorly, but took the lead after a furlong and held off the late challenge of Lord Kelburne's unnamed chestnut colt to win by a neck. On the following day he walked over for a Produce Stakes over the same course and distance. Launcelot ran for the third time at the meeting when he contested a sweepstakes two days later. He started 5/2 favourite but finished second of the ten runners, a neck behind the Duke of Cleveland's brother to Euclid (later named Theon).

=== 1840: three-year-old season ===
On 3 June 1840, Launcelot made his debut as a three-year-old in the Derby Stakes at Epsom Downs Racecourse. Ridden by Bill Scott he was made 9/4 favourite in a field of seventeen runners, with Assassin and Mr Etwall's unnamed Melody colt joint second-favourites on 7/2. Launcelot was among the leaders from the start and got the better of a sustained struggle with the Melody colt in the straight, but was overtaken in the final furlong by the 50/1 outsider Little Wonder and finished second by a length. Bill Scott reportedly shouted an offer of £1,000 to Little Wonder's jockey to "pull" his horse in the closing stages, but was rejected. Launcelot recorded his first "win" of the season in his next race, when he was allowed to walk over for a Produce Sweepstakes at Liverpool in July. At York in August Lord Westminster was able to claim another prize without having to run his colt when Launcelot's opponents were withdrawn from a two-miile sweepstakes.

On 15 September Launcelot was one of eleven three-year-olds to contest the sixtieth running of the St Leger Stakes at Doncaster. He started the 7/4 favourite ahead of Gibraltar and Maroon, another colt owned by Lord Westminster. Ridden as usual by Bill Scott, Launcelot took the lead early and set a steady pace. The favourite broke down in the straight but held on to win a "strange" race from Maroon, with Gibraltar a neck behind in third. There were suspicions that Maroon had been deliberately held back to allow his stable companion to win. A day after his win in the St Leger, Launcelot was scheduled to run in the Foal Stakes over one and a half miles against Mr Bowes' colt Black Beck. After the other runners were withdrawn, Black Beck was allowed to walk over the course, with Bowes and Lord Westminster dividing the forfeits.

=== 1841: four-year-old season ===
Launcelot remained in training as a four-year-old but broke down with injury when entered in a sweepstakes at Goodwood Racecourse in July.

== Stud record ==
Launcelot was retired from racing to become a breeding stallion, but appears to have had little success. In 1848 he was recorded as standing at Bangor in Ireland at a fee of eight shillings. Launcelot died in 1861 at the age of twenty-four.

== Pedigree ==
Pedigree of Launcelot (GB), bay 1837
Sire Camel 1822	Whalebone; 1807	Waxy	Potoooooooo*
Sire Camel 1822	Whalebone; 1807	Waxy	Maria
Sire Camel 1822	Whalebone; 1807	Penelope	Trumpator
Sire Camel 1822	Whalebone; 1807	Penelope	Prunella
Sire Camel 1822	Selim mare 1812	Selim	Buzzard*
Sire Camel 1822	Selim mare 1812	Selim	Alexander mare*
Sire Camel 1822	Selim mare 1812	Maiden	Sir Peter Teazle*
Sire Camel 1822	Selim mare 1812	Maiden	Phoenomenon mare
Dam Banter 1826	Master Henry; 1815	Orville	Beningbrough
Dam Banter 1826	Master Henry; 1815	Orville	Evelina
Dam Banter 1826	Master Henry; 1815	Miss Sophia	Stamford*
Dam Banter 1826	Master Henry; 1815	Miss Sophia	Sophia*
Dam Banter 1826	Boadicea; 1807	Alexander*	Eclipse*
Dam Banter 1826	Boadicea; 1807	Alexander*	Grecian Princess*
Dam Banter 1826	Boadicea; 1807	Brunette	Amaranthus
Dam Banter 1826	Boadicea; 1807	Brunette	Mayfly (family: 14-a)

* Launcelot is inbred 5S x 3D to the stallion Alexander, meaning that he appears fifth generation (via Alexander mare) on the sire side of his pedigree, and third generation on the dam side of his pedigree.

* Launcelot is inbred 5S x 6S x 4D to the stallion Eclipse, meaning that he appears fifth generation (via Potoooooooo) and sixth generation (via Alexander mare) on the sire side of his pedigree, and fourth generation on the dam side of his pedigree.

* Launcelot is inbred 4S x 5D to the stallion Buzzard, meaning that he appears fourth generation on the sire side of his pedigree, and fifth generation (via Sofia) on the dam side of his pedigree.

* Launcelot is inbred 4S x 5D to the stallion Sir Peter Teazle, meaning that he appears fourth generation on the sire side of his pedigree, and fifth generation (via Stamford) on the dam side of his pedigree.
