= Touchstone (horse) =

Thoroughbred racehorse

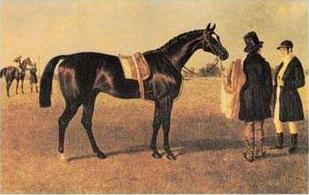
- Painter: John Frederick Herring Sr. (1795–1865)
- Sire: Camel
- Grandsire: Whalebone
- Dam: Banter
- Damsire: Master Henry
- Sex: Stallion
- Foaled: 1831
- Died: 1861 (aged 29–30)
- Country: Great Britain
- Colour: Brown
- Breeder: Robert Grosvenor, 1st Marquess of Westminster
- Owner: Robert Grosvenor, 1st Marquess of Westminster
- Trainer: John Scott
- Record: 21: 15–2–2
- Earnings: £5,475

Major wins
- Dee Stakes (1834); St. Leger Stakes (1834); Doncaster Gold Cup (1835, 1836); Ascot Gold Cup (1836, 1837)

Awards
- Leading sire in Great Britain and Ireland (1842, 1843, 1848, 1855)
- Last updated on May 7, 2009

Touchstone (1831–1861) was a British bred Thoroughbred racehorse and a leading sire in Great Britain and Ireland on four occasions. He was owned and bred by Robert Grosvenor, 1st Marquess of Westminster, who bought him for the low price, at the time, of 600 guineas at the insistence of his chief stud groom Mr. Thomas Nutting.

== Background ==
He was a brown colt, foaled in 1831, by Camel, his dam was the good broodmare, Banter, by Master Henry. Touchstone was a full brother to the St. Leger Stakes winner, Launcelot (br c 1837). Touchstone was described as a "peculiar horse" (according to The Druid), with an unusual conformation including fleshy legs and a thickened front ankle. He was a frail foal with badly turned hocks that caused him to travel wide when moving. He measured 15 hands 2 inches and had strong hindquarters. Touchstone was unusual in having 19 dorsal vertebrae and a segment of a nineteenth rib on each side, which contributed to his long back.

He was conditioned for racing by the preeminent trainer of the day, John Scott, although Scott did not lay eyes on Touchstone until mid-way through his Classic season.

== Racing career ==
=== Early career ===
Touchstone made his debut at Lichfield in the Produce Stakes, where he walked over. He then ran third to Queen Bess in the Champagne Stakes at the Holywell Hunt Meeting in October.

=== Classic season ===
Touchstone improved from his juvenile season to win five of his seven starts as a three-year-old. He debuted in the Dee Stakes at Chester in May, before following up in the Palatine Stakes the next day. In both races he beat Queen Bess, who had beaten him in the Champagne Stakes in 1833.

Touchstone did not run in the Derby (won by Plenipotentiary), and was next seen in the Liverpool St Leger, where he finished second to General Chassé after making the running. Despite this loss, trainer John Scott, who was seeing the horse for the first time, proclaimed that the horse would "carry off the St Leger", and ordered him to be brought to Malton in Yorkshire. Touchstone suffered an eventful journey, after his accompanying groom drank at too many inns and allowed the horse to escape into the wild. He was eventually caught by a seafarer and brought to Sheffield, but he was exhausted and in a bad way when he finally reached Scott's yard. He continued to train so badly that rider William Scott passed over the mount to George Calloway, a "country jockey".

Touchstone was sent off at 40/1 for the St Leger, as he faced not only his conqueror General Chassé, but the outstanding Derby winner Plenipotentiary, who many considered to be unbeatable. However, it was apparent afterwards that that horse had been poisoned, and Touchstone was able to record an easy two length victory. So unexpected was the win, that Calloway "seemed perfectly thunderstruck" and "turned his head right and left to see whether the others had not all been swallowed up". The atmosphere after Touchstone's win was one of complete astonishment.

Touchstone ran three more times that year: winning at Wrexham, then finishing second in the Mostyn Stakes at Holywell Hunt before walking over in the Chieftain Stakes the very same day.

=== Career as an older horse ===
Touchstone won six of eight starts as a four-year-old, including a walk over in the Stand Cup at Chester, a Gold Candelabrum worth 300 sovereigns at Doncaster, a Gold Plate and Gold Cup at Heaton, and two races on the same day at the Holywell Hunt in October. He also finished sixth in the Trademen's Cup at Liverpool.

As a five-year-old Touchstone was undefeated, and counted the Ascot Gold Cup, Doncaster Cup and Heaton Park Gold Cup among his wins. In the Ascot Gold Cup, he was ridden by John Day to beat 1833 St Leger winner Rockingham, and in the Doncaster Cup he defeated the great mare Beeswing.

Touchstone made one start as a six-year-old in 1837, and recorded a second win in the Ascot Gold Cup, this time under William Scott. The horse went to front at the turn before drawing away to beat Slane by an easy six lengths as the 1/2 favourite.

This was Touchstone's final race, and he retired to stud as the winner of fifteen of twenty-one starts with earnings of £5,475.

== Stud record ==
Touchstone was initially retired to stud duty at Moor Park, near Rickmansworth in Hertfordshire, but then was brought to his owner's Eaton Stud in Cheshire. A major success as a stallion, Touchstone sired three Epsom Derby winners and was the leading sire in Great Britain and Ireland four times. Of the eight foals from the great racing mare Beeswing, five were sired by Touchstone.

His progeny included:

- Blue Bonnet (1839) – won the St. Leger Stakes
- Cotherstone (1840) – won the 2,000 Guineas and the Epsom Derby
- Flatcatcher (1845) – won 2,000 Guineas Stakes
- Lord of the Isles (1852) – won 2,000 Guineas
- Mendicant (1843) – a filly who won the 1,000 Guineas and Epsom Oaks
- Newminster (1848) – won St. Leger Stakes, Leading sire in Great Britain & Ireland in 1859 and 1863, sire of champion sires: Adventurer, Lord Clifden, and seven-time Leading Sire, Hermit
- Nunnykirk (1846) – won 2,000 Guineas, 2nd in the St. Leger Stakes
- Orlando (1841) – won the Epsom Derby, Leading sire in Great Britain & Ireland (1851, 1854, 1858)
- Surplice (1845) – won the Epsom Derby and St. Leger Stakes

As late as 1859 he was described as looking "fresh and well" and his box at Eaton was reported to be one of the attractions for visitors to the Chester agricultural show. Touchstone died in 1861 aged thirty at Eaton Stud.

== Sire line tree ==
Descendants of Touchstone (click to show)
- Touchstone
  - Auckland
  - Cotherstone
    - Stilton
    - Speed The Plough
    - Pumicestone
    - Woodcote
    - Spencer
    - Glenmasson
      - Vestminster
        - Loeffler
  - Ithuriel
    - Longbow
      - Toxophilite
        - Young Toxophilite
          - The Admiral
        - Musket
        - Bay Archer
          - Valois
  - Orlando
    - Teddington
      - Shillelagh
      - Moulsey
    - King Pepin
    - Orpheus
    - Ninnyhammer
    - Orestes
      - Orest
        - Hollywood
    - Boiardo
      - Barwon
      - Banker
      - Oriflame
    - Marsyas
      - Albert Victor
        - Maskelyne
        - The Sailor Prince
      - George Frederick
        - Frontin
        - Colorado
    - Scythian
    - Duke Rollo
    - Fazzoletto
      - Ackworth
      - Blue Riband
      - King Victor
    - Porto Rico
    - King Of The Forest
    - The British Remedy
    - Chevalier d'Industrie
      - Friponnier
    - Claude Lorraine
    - Zuyder Zee
    - Eclipse
      - Throg's Neck Jr
      - Young Eclipse
      - Cambrist
      - Egotist
      - Boaster
      - Narragansett
      - Cavalier
      - Scathelock
      - Alarm
        - Danger
        - Himyar
        - Gabriel
        - Bruno
        - Panique
        - Pardee
        - Wawekus
      - Catesby
      - Osseo
      - Grandmaster
    - Fitzroland
      - Paladin
    - Gin
    - Trumpeter
      - Salpinctes
      - Abergeldie
      - Distin
      - Queens Messenger
      - Plutus
        - Flageolet
        - Fricandeau
        - Gournay
      - Challenge
        - Hastings
    - Crater
    - Canary
      - Xenophon
        - Seaman
        - Parasang
    - Diophantus
    - Wrestler
    - Chattanooga
      - Wellingtonia
        - Clover
        - Clairon
    - Liddington
    - Temple
    - The Knave
  - Annandale
    - Balrownie
  - Paragone
  - Poynton
    - Peto
  - William Tell
    - Archer
  - Flatcatcher
  - Surplice
    - Florin
      - Florentin
  - Nunnykirk
    - Potocki
  - The Italian
  - Mountain Deer
    - Drogheda
    - Mount Zion
    - Roebuck
    - Croagh Patrick
  - Young Touchstone
  - Vindex
    - Victor
    - The Avenger
  - Claret
    - Scots Grey
  - Lord Of The Isles
    - Dundee
    - Scottish Chief
      - King Of The Forest
      - Childeric
      - Fitzjames
      - Glengarry
      - Merry Go Round
      - Napsbury
      - Orient
      - Pursebearer
      - Taurus
      - Kantaka
        - Tipstaff
        - Baron Pepper
      - The Crofter
    - MacDonald
      - Gold Hill
  - Artillary
    - Revolver
      - Gamecock
    - Kyrle Daly
      - Herald
        - Kara
  - Lord Of The Hills
    - Glencoe
  - Tournament
    - Retrousse
    - Sabre
  - Wamba
  - Newminster
    - Daniel
    - Musjid
      - Leybourne
      - Wroughton
      - Islam
      - Vagabond
    - Newcastle
      - Charnwood
      - Sir Hugo
    - Joey Jones
    - Kildonan
    - Oldminster
    - Stanton
    - Adventurer
      - Argyle
        - Carsethorn
      - Border Knight
      - Pretender
      - Enterprise
      - Dunois
      - Speculation
        - Cork
      - Chivalrous
      - Pirate
      - Blantyre
      - Schwindler
      - Glen Arthur
      - Militant
      - Ruperra
        - Rajita Rajita
        - Achilles
      - Sir Amyas Leigh
      - Bonnie Doon
      - Sportsman
      - Ishmael
      - Privateer
        - Buccaneer
      - Borneo
    - Yorkminster
    - Lord Clifden
      - His Lordship
      - Falkenberg
      - Hawthornden
        - Sunset
      - Moorlands
      - Barefoot
        - Old Joe
      - Buckden
        - Alec Ament
        - Bend Or
        - Jim Guest
        - Babcock
        - Harry Gilmore
        - Mediator
        - Monogram
        - Ascender
        - Buchanan
      - Hymenaeus
        - Blue Monkey
        - Battenberg
      - Wenlock
        - Limestone
        - Quicklime
        - Deceiver
        - Cyrus
        - Panzerschiff
        - Abingdon
        - Martenhurst
      - Winslow
        - Roquefort
      - Hampton
        - Ladislas
        - Duke Of Richmond
        - Royal Hampton
        - Eothen
        - Grandison
        - Merry Hampton
        - Apollo
        - Ayrshire
        - Sheen
        - Gay Hampton
        - Lord Lorne
        - Fitz Hampton
        - Balmoral
        - Bushey Park
        - Phocion
        - Cheery Tree
        - Ladas
        - Speed
        - Walmsgate
        - Star Ruby
        - Troon
        - Bay Ronald
      - Bay Windham
      - Petrarch
        - The Bard
        - Laureate
        - Hackler
        - Lactantius
        - Peter Flower
        - The Lombard
        - Florist
      - Kinsman
      - Cyprus
      - El Rey
      - King of Trumps
        - The Rejected
      - Lord Clive
        - Calabrais
        - La Moriniere
      - Reefer
    - Meuzzin
    - Onesander
    - Pratique
    - Cambuscan
      - Botheration
      - Onslow
      - Cambuslang
        - Baron Farney
        - Come Away
      - Billesdon
        - Caesar
      - Camballo
        - Peppermint
        - The Lambkin
        - Eurasian
        - Campanula
        - Claymore
        - Hospodar
        - Nunthorpe
        - Ralph Neville
      - Cavaliero
      - Isolani
      - Frangepan
      - Cambus
      - Paszlor
    - Cathedral
      - Dalham
      - Organist
      - Clocher
      - El Plata
    - Midnight Mass
    - The Beadle
    - Bedminster
    - Heir-At-Law
    - Hurrah
      - Hermit
    - Laseretto
    - Victorious
      - Rosebach
    - Crown Prince
    - Laneret
    - Strathconan
      - Midlothian
      - Bishop Burton
      - Strathern
      - Buchanan
    - Vespasian
      - Bersaglier
      - Eastern Emperor
      - Blairgowrie
      - Touchstone
      - Greywing
      - Grey Gown
    - Hermit
      - Ascetic
        - St Andrew
        - Anchorite
        - Cenobite
        - Roman Oak
        - Royal Meath
        - Cloister
        - Ulysses
        - Abbot
        - Aconite
        - Hermit
        - Koodoo
        - Sir Patrick
        - Riverstown
        - Athletic
        - Drumcree
        - Hidden Mystery
        - Leinster
        - Uncle Jack
        - Orange Pat
        - Ascetic's Silver
      - Trappist
      - Ambergris
      - Gunnersbury
        - Uram Batyam
        - Galifard
      - Peter
        - Sweetheart
        - Zsupan
        - Peterhof
      - Retreat
        - Father O'Flynn
        - Skedaddle
      - St Louis
        - St Germaine
        - Le Hardy
      - Tristan
        - Le Nord
        - Le Nicham
      - Whipper-In
        - Malakoff
        - Revancha
      - Cassock
      - St Blaise
        - St Carlo
        - Potomac
        - Silver Fox
        - St Florian
        - Margrave
        - St Bartholomew
      - Candlemas
        - Irish Lad
      - Gamin
        - Gospodar
      - Gay Hermit
        - Talma
        - Balcarce
        - Gonin
        - Valero
        - Cordon Rouge
        - Celso
      - St Mirin
      - Timothy
      - Friar's Balsam
        - Balsamo
        - Voter
      - Hazelhatch
      - Melanion
        - Toscin
        - Esquileno
        - Guido Reni
      - Heaume
        - Le Roi Soleil
      - Orbend
        - Karibo
    - Kidderminster
    - Bogue Homa
    - Cardinal York
      - Havok
    - Conjuror
      - Juggler

== Pedigree ==
Pedigree of Touchstone (GB), brown stallion 1831
Sire Camel Brown 1822	Whalebone; 1807	Waxy	Potoooooooo*
Sire Camel Brown 1822	Whalebone; 1807	Waxy	Maria
Sire Camel Brown 1822	Whalebone; 1807	Penelope	Trumpator
Sire Camel Brown 1822	Whalebone; 1807	Penelope	Prunella
Sire Camel Brown 1822	Selim mare 1812	Selim	Buzzard*
Sire Camel Brown 1822	Selim mare 1812	Selim	Alexander mare* (1790)
Sire Camel Brown 1822	Selim mare 1812	Maiden	Sir Peter Teazle*
Sire Camel Brown 1822	Selim mare 1812	Maiden	Phoenomenon mare (24) (1788)
Dam Banter Brown 1826	Master Henry; 1815	Orville	Beningbrough
Dam Banter Brown 1826	Master Henry; 1815	Orville	Evelina
Dam Banter Brown 1826	Master Henry; 1815	Miss Sophia	Stamford*
Dam Banter Brown 1826	Master Henry; 1815	Miss Sophia	Sophia*
Dam Banter Brown 1826	Boadicea; 1807	Alexander*	Eclipse*
Dam Banter Brown 1826	Boadicea; 1807	Alexander*	Grecian Princess*
Dam Banter Brown 1826	Boadicea; 1807	Brunette	Amaranthus
Dam Banter Brown 1826	Boadicea; 1807	Brunette	Mayfly (family: 14)

* Touchstone is inbred 5S x 3D to the stallion Alexander, meaning that he appears fifth generation (via Alexander mare) on the sire side of his pedigree, and third generation on the dam side of his pedigree.

* Touchstone is inbred 5S x 6S x 4D to the stallion Eclipse, meaning that he appears fifth generation (via Potoooooooo) and sixth generation (via Alexander mare) on the sire side of his pedigree, and fourth generation on the dam side of his pedigree.

* Touchstone is inbred 4S x 5D to the stallion Buzzard, meaning that he appears fourth generation on the sire side of his pedigree, and fifth generation (via Sofia) on the dam side of his pedigree.

* Touchstone is inbred 4S x 5D to the stallion Sir Peter Teazle, meaning that he appears fourth generation on the sire side of his pedigree, and fifth generation (via Stamford) on the dam side of his pedigree.
