= George Frederick (horse) =

British Thoroughbred racehorse

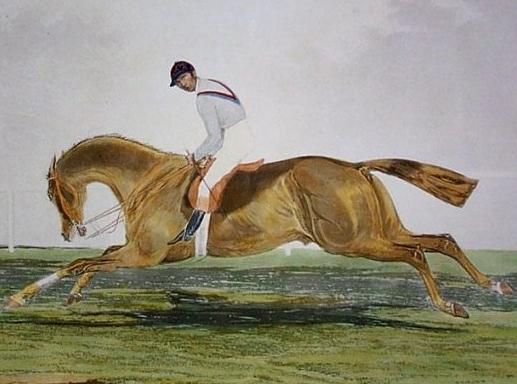
- George Frederick, painting by an unknown artist.
- Sire: Marsyas
- Grandsire: Orlando
- Dam: Princess of Wales
- Damsire: Stockwell
- Sex: Stallion
- Foaled: 1871
- Country: United Kingdom of Great Britain and Ireland
- Colour: Bay
- Breeder: W. S. Cartwright
- Owner: W. S. Cartwright
- Trainer: Thomas Leader
- Record: 10:5-0-2
- Earnings: £

Major wins
- Newmarket Stakes (1874); Epsom Derby (1874)

George Frederick (1871–1896) was a British Thoroughbred racehorse and sire. In a career that lasted from 1873 to 1874 he ran ten times and won five races. His most notable success came as a three-year-old in 1874 when he won The Derby. At the end of the season he was retired to stud where he had little success.

== Background ==
George Frederick, described by the Times of India as "a bright golden chestnut of great muscular power" was bred by his owner, William Sherard Cartwright a former solicitor and mine-owner. The colt was sent into training with Tom Olliver at Wroughton, near Swindon in Wiltshire but when Olliver fell ill in 1873, the stables were taken over by his twenty-six-year-old assistant, Thomas Leader.

Cartwright sent his mare, Princess of Wales, to the stallion Marsyas for several years in succession, and named all her foals after members of the British royal family. These included the colt Albert Victor, who ran second to Favonius in the 1871 Derby. George Frederick was named after Queen Victoria’s grandson, the future King George V.

== Racing career ==
=== 1873: two-year-old season ===
George Frederick was unplaced on his debut in a Biennial Stakes at York in August, when he appeared less than fully fit. At Doncaster in September he won the Municipal Stakes from the future Epsom Oaks and St Leger winner Apology and then finished third to Farnsfield in a six furlong sweepstakes at the same course. He ran four times at Newmarket in autumn, winning the Boscawen Stakes and a Triennial Produce Stakes at the first October meeting but finishing unplaced in the Middle Park Plate and the Criterion Stakes. The Field described him as a promising colt, but not a potential Derby winner.

=== 1874: three-year-old season ===
George Frederick began his three-year-old season at Newmarket in April, when he finished third in a Biennial Stakes. He did not run in the 2000 Guineas, but reappeared in the Newmarket Stakes, in mid-May, which he won. He then performed very impressively in a private trial gallop.

In the Derby on 3 June (the eighth birthday of the prince after whom he was named), George Frederick started 9/1 in a field of twenty runners. Glenalmond started favourite, with Couronne de Fer and the 2000 Guineas winner Atlantic also strongly fancied. Although the ground was softened by heavy overnight rain, the weather on Derby day was fine and the crowd was as large as usual, with both Parliament and the Stock Exchange closing down for the day. Ridden by Harry Custance, George Frederick was towards the back of the field in the early stages, before moving up to sixth place at half way as the lead was held by his stable companion Volturno. George Frederick was moved up to take the lead early in the straight and was never threatened, winning easily by two lengths from Couronne de Fer, with Atlantic a neck further back in third.

There were great celebrations on George Frederick’s return to Wiltshire: there was a procession through the streets of Swindon, with a local band playing "See the Conquering Hero Comes" (a tune composed by George Frederick Handel) on the Derby winner's arrival. At Wroughton the church bells were rung and the village was decorated in the red and black colours of the winning owner.

George Frederick subsequently became difficult to train and never won again. He was expected to run in the St Leger and was heavily backed, but rumours of training problems surfaced and Cartwright was forced to prove the colt’s wellbeing by inviting members of the sporting press to view the horse at his stables. On the morning of the race, it was announced that the colt had suffered a leg injury and would not run, provoking a great deal of "bitter feeling", even though a veterinary certificate was produced to prove the legitimacy of the problem.

== Stud career ==
George Frederick made little impact as a stallion but sired one very good horse in the colt Frontin, who won the Prix du Jockey Club and the Grand Prix de Paris in 1883. By 1892 George Frederick had gone blind and was sold for 65 guineas by the Marden Stud to a Mr Bevill. He was exported to the United States where he died in Crescent, Missouri on 23 September 1896.

== Sire line tree ==
- George Frederick
  - Frontin
  - Colorado
    - Sundorne
      - Sunloch

== Pedigree ==
Pedigree of George Frederick (GB), chestnut stallion, 1871
| Sire Marsyas (GB) 1851 | Orlando; 1841 | Touchstone | Camel |
| Sire Marsyas (GB) 1851 | Orlando; 1841 | Touchstone | Banter |
| Sire Marsyas (GB) 1851 | Orlando; 1841 | Vulture | Langar |
| Sire Marsyas (GB) 1851 | Orlando; 1841 | Vulture | Kite* |
| Sire Marsyas (GB) 1851 | Malibran; 1830 | Whisker | Waxy |
| Sire Marsyas (GB) 1851 | Malibran; 1830 | Whisker | Penelope |
| Sire Marsyas (GB) 1851 | Malibran; 1830 | Garcia | Octavian |
| Sire Marsyas (GB) 1851 | Malibran; 1830 | Garcia | Shuttle mare |
| Dam Princess of Wales (GB) 1862 | Stockwell; 1849 | The Baron | Birdcatcher |
| Dam Princess of Wales (GB) 1862 | Stockwell; 1849 | The Baron | Echidna |
| Dam Princess of Wales (GB) 1862 | Stockwell; 1849 | Pocahontas | Glencoe |
| Dam Princess of Wales (GB) 1862 | Stockwell; 1849 | Pocahontas | Marpessa |
| Dam Princess of Wales (GB) 1862 | The Bloomer; 1850 | Melbourne | Humphrey Clinker |
| Dam Princess of Wales (GB) 1862 | The Bloomer; 1850 | Melbourne | Cervantes mare |
| Dam Princess of Wales (GB) 1862 | The Bloomer; 1850 | Lady Sarah | Velocipede |
| Dam Princess of Wales (GB) 1862 | The Bloomer; 1850 | Lady Sarah | Lady Moore Carew* (Family: 13-a) |

* George Frederick is inbred 4S x 5D to the mare Kite, meaning that she appears fourth generation on the sire side of his pedigree, and fifth generation (via Lady Moore Carew) on the dam side of his pedigree.
