= Orlando (horse) =

British-bred Thoroughbred racehorse

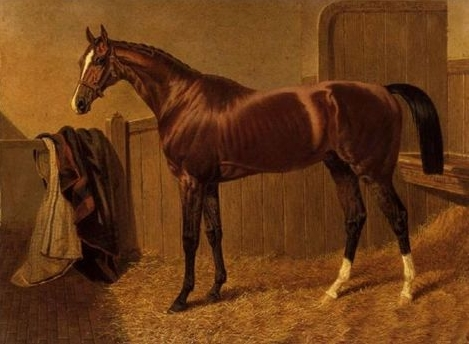
- Sire: Touchstone
- Grandsire: Camel
- Dam: Vulture
- Damsire: Langar
- Sex: Stallion
- Foaled: 1841 (185 years ago)
- Country: United Kingdom of Great Britain and Ireland
- Colour: Bay
- Breeder: Jonathan Peel
- Owner: Jonathan Peel
- Trainer: Mr. Cooper
- Record: 12: 10 wins

Major wins
- July Stakes (1843); Epsom Derby (1844)

Awards
- 1851, 1854 & 1858 Leading sire in Great Britain and Ireland
- Last updated on 22 July 2011

Orlando (foaled 1841) was a British Thoroughbred racehorse best known for winning the Derby and as a Leading sire in Great Britain and Ireland.

== Racing record ==
Racing at age two, one of Orlando's most significant wins came in the July Stakes at Newmarket Racecourse. Ridden by Nat Flatman, the three-year-old Orlando finished second in the 1844 Epsom Derby but was awarded first place after an investigation concluded that winner "Running Rein" was in reality a four-year-old named Maccabeus who ran in Running Rein's name.

== Stud record ==
Orlando stood at his owners stud until August 1851 when Peel held a dispersal sale and Orlando was sold to Charles Greville. Orlando was the Leading sire in Great Britain & Ireland three times, in 1851, 1854, and 1858. He was second and/or third on the sires list seven times between 1853 and 1861. In all, he was the sire of 352 horses who won a total of 797 races including four Classics. Teddington won the 1851 Epsom Derby, and Fazzoletto, Diophantus and Fitz-Roland, all won the 2,000 Guineas. His daughter, Imperieuse won the St Leger Stakes and One Thousand Guineas, and was the dam of Deliane (won FR Prix de Diane).

Orlando was also the grandsire of Ruthless, winner of the inaugural running of America's Belmont Stakes in 1867 and one of only three fillies to ever win that American Classic.

== Sire line tree ==
- Orlando
  - Teddington
    - Shillelagh
    - Moulsey
  - King Pepin
  - Orpheus
  - Ninnyhammer
  - Orestes
    - Orest
      - Hollywood
  - Boiardo
    - Barwon
    - Banker
    - Oriflame
  - Marsyas
    - Albert Victor
      - Maskelyne
      - The Sailor Prince
    - George Frederick
      - Frontin
      - Colorado
        - Sundorne
  - Scythian
  - Duke Rollo
  - Fazzoletto
    - Ackworth
    - Blue Riband
    - King Victor
  - Porto Rico
  - King Of The Forest
  - The British Remedy
  - Chevalier d'Industrie
    - Friponnier
  - Claude Lorraine
  - Zuyder Zee
  - Eclipse
    - Throg's Neck Jr
    - Young Eclipse
    - Cambrist
    - Egotist
    - Boaster
    - Narragansett
    - Cavalier
    - Scathelock
    - Alarm
      - Danger
      - Himyar
        - Faraday
        - Domino
        - Halton
        - Harry Reed
        - Plaudit
        - Hyphen
      - Gabriel
      - Bruno
      - Panique
      - Pardee
        - Proteinol
      - Wawekus
    - Catesby
    - Osseo
    - Grandmaster
  - Fitzroland
    - Paladin
  - Gin
  - Trumpeter
    - Salpinctes
    - Abergeldie
    - Distin
    - Queens Messenger
    - Plutus
      - Flageolet
        - Ismael
        - Rayon d'Or
        - Zut
          - Palamede
          - Frapotel
          - Le Torpilleur
          - Fligney
          - Canigou
        - Beauminet
          - Chalet
            - Maximum
              - Ultimatum
              - Pere Marquette
          - Barnato
          - Bonvivant
        - Le Destrier
          - Stuart
            - Ivry
          - Tournesol
          - Rachenputzer
        - Comte Alfred
        - Fenelon
        - Reussi
        - Manoel
          - Melibee
        - Xaintrailles
          - Cadix
          - Le Borda
          - Melchoir
          - Poluygone
          - Le Bizon
        - Geiheimrath
          - Artig Kind
        - Nebenbuhler
        - Auerhahn
        - Geier
        - Meistersinger
        - Goldschaum
          - Paris
            - Goldschlaeger
              - Goldammer
                - Goldfisch
                  - Graf
                    - Grande
                      - Graphit
                        - Grannus
                  - Gotthard
        - Argwohn
        - Lebemann
      - Fricandeau
        - Doge
      - Gournay
    - Challenge
      - Hastings
        - Tegetthoff
  - Crater
  - Canary
    - Xenophon
      - Seaman
      - Parasang
  - Diophantus
  - Wrestler
  - Chattanooga
    - Wellingtonia
      - Clover
        - Arreau
      - Clairon
        - Demetrio
  - Liddington
  - Temple
  - The Knave

== Pedigree ==
Pedigree of Orlando (GB), bay stallion, 1841
| Sire Touchstone Br. 1831 | Camel; 1822 | Whalebone | Waxy |
| Sire Touchstone Br. 1831 | Camel; 1822 | Whalebone | Penelope |
| Sire Touchstone Br. 1831 | Camel; 1822 | Selim mare (1812) | Selim* |
| Sire Touchstone Br. 1831 | Camel; 1822 | Selim mare (1812) | Maiden |
| Sire Touchstone Br. 1831 | Banter; 1826 | Master Henry | Orville |
| Sire Touchstone Br. 1831 | Banter; 1826 | Master Henry | Miss Sophia |
| Sire Touchstone Br. 1831 | Banter; 1826 | Boadicea | Alexander* |
| Sire Touchstone Br. 1831 | Banter; 1826 | Boadicea | Brunette |
| Dam Vulture 1833 | Langar; 1817 | Selim* | Buzzard* |
| Dam Vulture 1833 | Langar; 1817 | Selim* | Alexander mare (1790)* |
| Dam Vulture 1833 | Langar; 1817 | Walton mare (1808) | Walton |
| Dam Vulture 1833 | Langar; 1817 | Walton mare (1808) | Young Giantess |
| Dam Vulture 1833 | Kite; 1821 | Bustard | Castrel* |
| Dam Vulture 1833 | Kite; 1821 | Bustard | Miss Hap |
| Dam Vulture 1833 | Kite; 1821 | Olympia | Sir Oliver |
| Dam Vulture 1833 | Kite; 1821 | Olympia | Scotilla (Family: 13-a) |

* Orlando is inbred 4S x 3D to the stallion Selim, meaning that he appears fourth generation on the sire side of his pedigree, and third generation on the dam side of his pedigree.

* Orlando is inbred 5S x 4D x 5D to the stallion Buzzard, meaning that he appears fifth generation (via Selim) on the sire side of his pedigree, and fourth generation and fifth generation (via Castrel) on the dam side of his pedigree.

* Orlando is inbred 4S x 5D to the stallion Alexander, meaning that he appears fourth generation on the sire side of his pedigree, and fifth generation (via Alexander mare) on the dam side of his pedigree.
