= Musjid (horse) =

British-bred Thoroughbred racehorse

- Musjid with John Wells up
- Sire: Newminster
- Grandsire: Touchstone
- Dam: Peggy
- Damsire: Muley Moloch
- Sex: Stallion
- Foaled: 1856
- Country: United Kingdom of Great Britain and Ireland
- Colour: Brown
- Breeder: Lord Scarborough
- Owner: Sir Joseph Hawley
- Trainer: George Manning
- Record: 4: 3-0-1

Major wins
- Epsom Derby (1859)

Musjid (1856–1865) was a British Thoroughbred racehorse and sire. In 1859, he won both of his races including The Derby, in which he landed a huge gamble for his owner despite concerted efforts to prevent him winning. Musjid developed leg problems after the Derby and never ran again. He was retired to stud, where he made little impression before his early death in 1865 from a stomach rupture.

== Background ==
Musjid was a "stylish-looking" brown horse with a white star on his head who stood 15.3 hands high. He was bred by Lord Scarborough at his Tickhill stud in Yorkshire. Musjid was sent to the Doncaster sales, where he failed to find a buyer willing to pay the reserve price of 300 guineas. He was later sold for £200 in a private deal to Sir Joseph Hawley, with a proviso that Sir Joseph would pay an additional £500 if the colt won the Derby.

Musjid was sent into training with George Manning, who trained Hawley's colt Beadsman to win the 1858 derby, at his stable at Cannons Heath, near Kingsclere in Hampshire. Manning's stable was a converted barn and was not noted for its hygiene: a stagnant pond "where frogs and beetles revel" stood close by the entrance and was blamed for causing outbreaks of fever and "malaria" among the inmates.

== Racing career ==
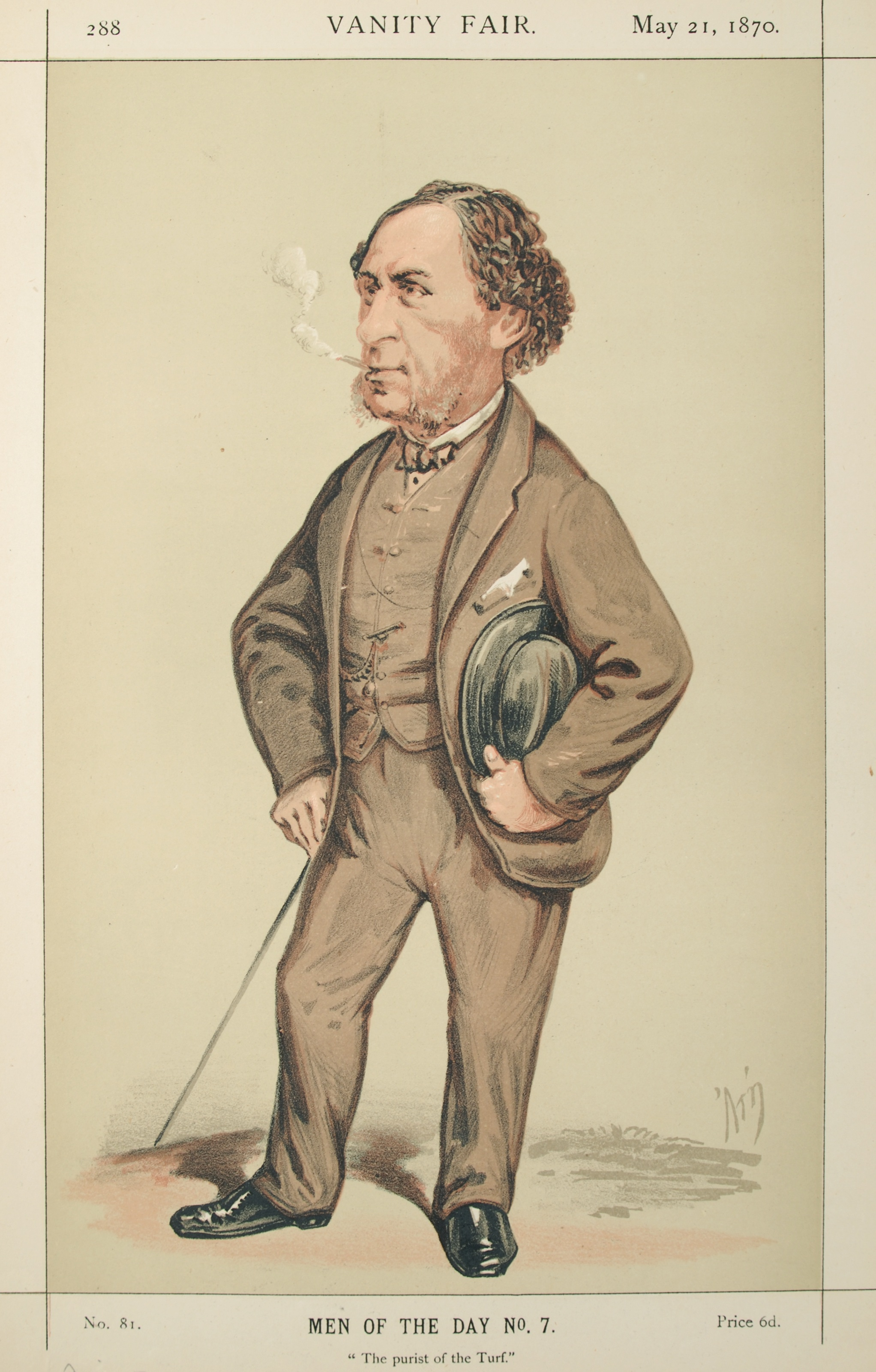
Joseph Hawley, Musjid's owner, who won more than £75,000 on the 1859 Derby

=== 1858: two-year-old season ===
Musjid was the subject of very positive rumours before his debut, but ran disappointingly and finished third to North Lincoln in the New Stakes at Ascot on 2 June. On 17 June he started 5/4 favourite for the Mottisford Stakes at Stockbridge Racecourse and won easily by a length from Sir Hercules. One source also claims that he won a race at Newmarket later that year. After his win at Stockbridge, the New Sporting Magazine noted that while he seemed to lack the pace to be a leading two-year-old, he looked like a potential Derby horse.

=== 1859: three-year-old season ===
In the spring of 1862, Musjid won a match race at Newmarket in which he defeated a filly owned by Lord Glasgow. He did not run again before the Derby, but his impressive form in training gallops against a good colt named Gallus was enough to establish him as a leading contender, and he was the subject of heavy wagering by his owner, who stood to win a reported £75,000.

At Epsom, Musjid was ridden by John Wells and started 9/4 favourite in a field of thirty runners. Many bookmakers faced paying out huge sums if Musjid won and attempts were made to ensure his defeat. Several jockeys attempted to box in the favourite while others, including the rider of the joint-second-favourite The Promised Land, were alleged to have deliberately “pulled” their horses to ensure a win for the outsider Marionette. In a rough and unsatisfactory race, Wells managed to extricate Musjid from a bad position and produced the colt with a strong late challenge to take the lead well inside the final furlong and win by half a length from Marionette and Trumpeter. Confusion ensued when the racecourse judge completely misread the finish and awarded second place to a colt named Ticket-of-Leave who had not finished in the first ten: the correct finishing order was only established after an inquiry. Hawley's winning bets on the colt were reported to be the highest ever paid out to an individual on a single race.

In October, a match race between Musjid and The Promised Land was arranged for Newmarket. Musjid, however was having training problems and it was decided to withdraw him from the race and pay a forfeit. Musjid's worsening leg trouble meant that he was unable to race again and he was retired to stud.

== Stud career ==
Musjid stood as a stallion at Sir Joseph's stud at Leybourne Grange in Kent. He had little opportunity to prove himself as a sire as he died in 1865 from a "rupture in the stomach" at the age of nine. He sired one good horse in Vagabond, who won the Trial Stakes in 1869, but who, as a gelding, was incapable of continuing Musjid’s sire-line.

== Pedigree ==
Pedigree of Musjid (GB), brown stallion, 1856
Sire Newminster (GB) 1848	Touchstone; 1831	Camel	Whalebone
Sire Newminster (GB) 1848	Touchstone; 1831	Camel	Selim mare
Sire Newminster (GB) 1848	Touchstone; 1831	Banter	Master Henry*
Sire Newminster (GB) 1848	Touchstone; 1831	Banter	Boadicea
Sire Newminster (GB) 1848	Beeswing; 1833	Doctor Syntax	Paynator
Sire Newminster (GB) 1848	Beeswing; 1833	Doctor Syntax	Beningbrough mare
Sire Newminster (GB) 1848	Beeswing; 1833	Ardrossan mare	Ardrossan
Sire Newminster (GB) 1848	Beeswing; 1833	Ardrossan mare	Lady Eliza
Dam Peggy (GB) 1840	Muley Moloch; 1830	Muley	Orville*
Dam Peggy (GB) 1840	Muley Moloch; 1830	Muley	Eleanor
Dam Peggy (GB) 1840	Muley Moloch; 1830	Nancy	Dick Andrews
Dam Peggy (GB) 1840	Muley Moloch; 1830	Nancy	Spitfire
Dam Peggy (GB) 1840	Fanny; 1830	Jerry	Smolensko
Dam Peggy (GB) 1840	Fanny; 1830	Jerry	Louisa*
Dam Peggy (GB) 1840	Fanny; 1830	Fair Charlotte	Catton
Dam Peggy (GB) 1840	Fanny; 1830	Fair Charlotte	Henrietta (Family:6)

* Musjid is inbred 5S x 4D x 5D to the stallion Orville, meaning that he appears fifth generation (via Master Henry) on the sire side of his pedigree, and fourth generation and fifth generation (via Louisa) on the dam side of his pedigree.
