= Gay Hermit =

British-bred thoroughbred racehorse

- Sire: Hermit
- Grandsire: Newminster
- Dam: Doll Tearsheet
- Damsire: Broomielaw
- Sex: Stallion
- Foaled: 1883
- Country: Great Britain
- Colour: Bay
- Breeder: Mr. J. Crowther and Mr. M. Harrison
- Owner: "Mr. Manton" (Caroline Beresford, Duchess of Montrose); Santiago Luro

Major wins
- Woodcote Stakes (1885); Royal Stakes (1885); Biennial Stakes (1885); Prince of Wales's Stakes (1885); Hopeful Stakes (1885); Great Yorkshire Stakes (1886); Triennial Produce Stakes (1886); Triennial Stakes (1886); Royal Hunt Cup (1887); Great Lancashire Handicap (1887); Gran Premio Internacional (1888)

Awards
- Leading Sire in Argentina (1896–1898, 1901); Leading Broodmare Sire in Argentina (1910–13, 1915–16)

Gay Hermit (1883–1906?) was a British-bred thoroughbred racehorse and influential sire in Argentina.

== Background ==
Gay Hermit was a bay stallion bred by J. Crowther and M. Harrison, sired by Hermit out of Doll Tearsheet, who would later produce Epsom Derby winner Merry Hampton.

Gay Hermit had a "very sound constitution" and was considered very handsome.

Gay Hermit was sold for 800 guineas as a yearling.

== Racing career ==
As a two-year-old in 1885, Gay Hermit was considered "a useful second-class horse". He was engaged in 69 races and won 7, earning £4,930.

After winning the Woodcote Stakes, Gay Hermit was soundly beaten in the Whitsuntide Plate by Philosophy. In the Triennial Stakes, Gay Hermit was the only horse to face Philosophy, and he upset her and won by three-quarters of a length. In the Royal Stakes, Gay Hermit started as the even odds favorite, and he recovered from stumbling in the stretch to finish first in a dead heat with Exmoor. Gay Hermit then won the Biennial Stakes before finishing second again to Philosophy in the Lavant Stakes.

Gay Hermit won the Prince of Wales's Stakes for two-year-olds as the favorite. In the Champion Breeders' Foal Stakes, Gay Hermit finished fourth after showing distress at the distance. Gay Hermit ran second in the Champagne Stakes to Minting. In the Hopeful Stakes, Gay Hermit came up just in time to dead heat for first with Modwena, who had previously easily beaten him.

In the Dewhurst Plate, Gay Hermit was "stale" after his hard season and finished fifth behind the winner Ormonde. Following the race, odds of 20 to 1 for the Epsom Derby were offered on Gay Hermit.

By April 1886, Gay Hermit was said to have made "vast improvement".

In 1886, Gay Hermit ran second as the favorite in the Triennial Stakes, second in the Stockbridge Cup by a length and a half, won the Stockbridge Biennial Stakes by a length, finished unplaced in the Eclipse Stakes, won the Great Yorkshire Stakes by a length and a half, finished second to Whitelock in the Alexandra Plate by a length, and won the Triennial Produce Stakes by two lengths. He won three of six starts as a three-year-old. Gay Hermit broke down in the Doncaster Stakes.

Gay Hermit was a close second in the 1887 Liverpool Autumn Cup. He followed this performance with a win in the Great Lancashire Handicap the next day.

Gay Hermit won 14 races in England.

At the end of 1887, Gay Hermit was purchased by Santiago Luro and exported to Argentina. There, he broke down while winning the Gran Premio Internacional (later known as the Gran Premio Carlos Pellegrini).

== Stud career ==
Gay Hermit was retired to stand stud at Haras Ojo de Agua after his injury. He was considered an excellent sire and an extraordinary damsire.

Gay Hermit led the Argentine general sire list four times, in 1896, 1897, 1898, and 1901. He led the Argentine broodmare sire list six times, 1910–1913, 1915, and 1916, and finished second in 1918 and third in 1914.

Gay Hermit was buried at Haras Ojo de Agua after his death.

=== Notable progeny ===
- Cordon Rouge, winner of the Gran Premio Nacional, Gran Premio Jockey Club, Clásico Eliseo Ramírez, Clásico Ignacio Correas, etc.
- Valero, winner of the Gran Premio Nacional and Gran Premio Jockey Club
- Balcarce, winner of the Gran Premio Polla de Potrillos
- Berezina, winner of the Gran Premio Polla de Potrancas
- Celso, winner of La Copa, champion sire in Chile
- Citoyenne, winner of the Gran Premio Polla de Potrancas
- Colombia, winner of the Gran Premio Selección
- Espina, winner of the Gran Premio Selección
- Fedra, winner of the Gran Premio Polla de Potrancas
- Gonin, champion sire in Chile
- Talma, winner of the Gran Premio Polla de Potrillos and Durban July Handicap
- Tarantula, winner of the Gran Premio Selección
- Túnica, winner of the Clásico St. Leger, etc.

=== Notable progeny of daughters ===
- Locandiera, winner of the Gran Premio Selección and Gran Premio Polla de Potrancas
- Parva, winner of the Gran Premio Selección, Premio Ignacio Correas, etc.
- Partícula, winner of the Gran Premio Selección
- Elcano, winner of the Clásico General San Martín
- Enero, winner of the Clásico Comparación
- Magda, winner of the Polla de Potrancas (Chile) and Clásico St. Leger

== Sire line tree ==
- Gay Hermit
  - Talma
  - Balcarce
  - Gonin
  - Valero
    - Mister Irving
  - Cordon Rouge
  - Celso

== Pedigree ==
Pedigree of Gay Hermit (GB), bay stallion, foaled 1883
Sire Hermit (GB) 1864	Newminster (GB); 1848	Touchstone (GB)	Camel (GB)
Sire Hermit (GB) 1864	Newminster (GB); 1848	Touchstone (GB)	Banter (GB)
Sire Hermit (GB) 1864	Newminster (GB); 1848	Beeswing (GB)	Doctor Syntax (GB)
Sire Hermit (GB) 1864	Newminster (GB); 1848	Beeswing (GB)	Ardrossan Mare (GB)
Sire Hermit (GB) 1864	Seclusion (GB); 1857	Tadmor (GB)	Ion (GB)
Sire Hermit (GB) 1864	Seclusion (GB); 1857	Tadmor (GB)	Palmyra (GB)
Sire Hermit (GB) 1864	Seclusion (GB); 1857	Miss Sellon (GB)	Cowl (GB)
Sire Hermit (GB) 1864	Seclusion (GB); 1857	Miss Sellon (GB)	Belle Dame (GB)
Dam Doll Tearsheet (GB) 1877	Broomielaw (GB); 1862	Stockwell (GB)	The Baron (GB)
Dam Doll Tearsheet (GB) 1877	Broomielaw (GB); 1862	Stockwell (GB)	Pocahontas (GB)
Dam Doll Tearsheet (GB) 1877	Broomielaw (GB); 1862	Queen Mary (GB)	Gladiator (GB)
Dam Doll Tearsheet (GB) 1877	Broomielaw (GB); 1862	Queen Mary (GB)	Plenipotentiary Mare (GB)
Dam Doll Tearsheet (GB) 1877	Mrs Quickly (GB); 1857	Longbow (GB)	Ithuriel (GB)
Dam Doll Tearsheet (GB) 1877	Mrs Quickly (GB); 1857	Longbow (GB)	Miss Bowe (GB)
Dam Doll Tearsheet (GB) 1877	Mrs Quickly (GB); 1857	Venus (GB)	Sir Hercules (GB)
Dam Doll Tearsheet (GB) 1877	Mrs Quickly (GB); 1857	Venus (GB)	Echo (GB)
