= Merry Hampton =

British-bred Thoroughbred racehorse

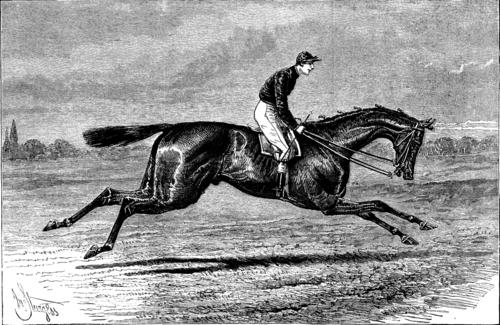
- Merry Hampton, from Illustrated London News
- Sire: Hampton
- Grandsire: Lord Clifden
- Dam: Doll Tearsheet
- Damsire: Mrs Quickly
- Sex: Stallion
- Foaled: 1884
- Country: United Kingdom of Great Britain and Ireland
- Colour: Bay
- Breeder: Crowther Harrison
- Owner: George Alexander Baird (“Mr Abington”)
- Trainer: William Stevens; Martin Gurry
- Record: 4: 1–1–0

Major wins
- Epsom Derby (1887)

Merry Hampton (foaled 1884) was a British Thoroughbred racehorse and sire. In a career that lasted from 1887 to 1888 he ran four times and won once in a career that was restricted by injuries and training difficulties. His sole victory came on his racecourse debut when he won the 1887 Epsom Derby as an 11/1 "dark horse". He never won again but did finish second in the St. Leger Stakes at Doncaster. He was retired to stud after a single start as a four-year-old in which he aggravated a chronic leg injury.

== Background ==
Merry Hampton was bred at the Cottingham Stud in Yorkshire by J. Crowther Harrison. He was a dark bay horse standing 16 hands high, and although strong and "wiry" he was not a particularly attractive individual, being described by one observer as "jumped up, peacocky (and) lacking in depth." He was sold as a yearling in September 1885 at the Doncaster sales for 3,100 guineas to George Alexander Baird, who ran in his racing interests under the name of “Mr. Abington”. Baird, who had inherited a vast fortune at a young age, had been a talented amateur rider before being banned for “foul riding” at the age of twenty-one and was ill-disposed towards the racing “establishment”. By 1886, Baird’s relationship with his trainer, Martin Gurry, had broken down, and so the colt was sent into training with William Stevens in Berkshire. In May 1887, however, Baird was reconciled with Gurry and Merry Hampton was removed from Stevens and sent to Gurry’s Bedford Lodge stable at Newmarket.

Merry Hampton's sire, Hampton was an excellent stayer who won both the Goodwood Cup and the Doncaster Cup. Hampton was Champion sire in 1887 and sired, in addition to Merry Hampton, the Derby winners Ladas and Ayrshire as well as the influential sires Bay Ronald and Royal Hampton. Merry Hampton’s dam, Doll Tearsheet, also produced Gay Hermit, who won the Royal Hunt Cup and went on to become a successful sire in Argentina.

== Racing career ==
=== 1887: three-year-old season ===
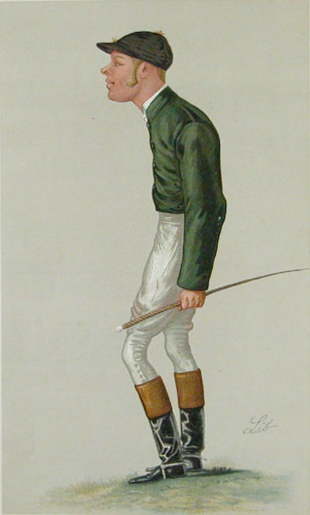
George Alexander Baird, Merry Hampton's owner, in his days as an amateur jockey.

Merry Hampton made his first appearance in the 1887 Derby at Epsom. In April he was considered a possible runner for the 2000 Guineas but did not take part, although he began to appear in the Derby betting at odds of 40/1 and 33/1. Merry Hampton's status as a serious Derby contender had become apparent by 19 May, six days before the race, when he was quoted at odds of 14/1. Shortly afterwards, the second favourite Enterprise, owned by Baird's cousin, was reported injured and withdrawn from the race and by 23 May Merry Hampton had been cut to 10/1.

At Epsom on 25 May Merry Hampton started at odds of 100/9 (11/1) in a field of eleven. The race was run on a "cloudy, cold and raw" day in front of the customary vast crowd which included the Prince of Wales and other members of the Royal Family. The Baron started 5/4 favourite, and was picked as the winner by eighteen of the nineteen newspaper "prophets", while Martley, trained by William Stevens was also well fancied and started on 10/1. Ridden as he would be in all his races by Jack Watts, Merry Hampton was held up in the early stages as the running was made by Porcelain and the unnamed Shannon colt, before Blanchland and Eiridspord took over and led the field into the straight. Watts had moved Merry Hampton forward into third, just ahead of The Baron on the turn for home and made his challenge as the leaders began to tire. He took the lead two furlongs out, quickly went clear and was never in danger of defeat, winning by an official margin four lengths (some observers thought it was more like seven) from The Baron with Martley two lengths further back in third. Although the winning time of 2:43 equaled the race record, it was widely agreed that the 1887 Derby had been a sub-standard one. For reasons he chose not to explain, Baird, who reportedly won £40,000 in bets on the race, refused to lead the horse in. Shortly afterwards, it was reported that Merry Hampton had wrenched off a shoe and received a minor injury due to "the prick of a nail", but he recovered quickly and resumed training.

Ten days later, Merry Hampton was sent across the Channel for what was then the most important race in France, the Grand Prix de Paris over 3000m at Longchamp for which he started 4/5 favourite. His chance in the race was not helped at the start, where he was kicked in the leg by one of the other runners. Watts settled the colt in fifth place, but when the horses turned into the straight he was unable to make progress and finished fourth behind the filly Tenebreuse who won by two lengths from The Baron. The defeat of the two English colts provoked enthusiastically nationalistic celebrations from the French crowd with many cries of "A bas les Anglaises!".

On 14 September Merry Hampton appeared at Doncaster for the St Leger. Four days before the race, he was reported to have sustained a "severe sprain" in training and was considered an unlikely runner. Merry Hampton did start in the St Leger, but having at one time been the 5/2 favourite for the race, his price drifted out to 33/1 before shortening again to 6/1 when it became clear that he would run. At the start, Kilwarlin, one of the joint favourites was left behind and only caught up with the rest of the field after a mile had been traveled. Merry Hampton raced prominently, but lost his position in the straight as first Phil, then Eiridspord, then the resurgent Kilwarlin took the lead. He recovered however and produced a strong finish but failed by half a length to catch Kilwarlin with Timothy and Phil a head and a neck further back in third and fourth. The close finish was described as "one of the finest ever witnessed at Doncaster After the race, Merry Hampton was found to be "dead lame" in his stable.

=== 1888: four-year-old season ===
Merry Hampton was kept in training at four and was entered in races such as the Jubilee Stakes at Kempton and the Eclipse Stakes at Sandown. On his debut he was made 75/20 favourite for the City and Suburban handicap at Epsom on 11 April, despite carrying top weight of 122 pounds. He was never in contention and was virtually pulled up by Jack Watts, finishing tailed off last of the fourteen runners. Watts reported that the colt seemed "dazed and stupid" during the race, leading to speculation that Merry Hampton had been "got at", possibly with an injection of opium. A veterinary examination however, revealed that the colt's suspensory ligament in his left foreleg, which had troubled him for many months, had "gone" and Merry Hampton never raced again.

== Assessment ==
Merry Hampton has been described as one of the least distinguished Derby winners of his era, although it has been pointed out that he would have achieved more if he had stayed sound. The Derby was, after all, the only race in which he ran free from injury. Although he won easily at Epsom, the field was described as "the absolutely worst"(sic) on record, and in August 1887 one correspondent described him as "probably one of the worst horses that ever won the Derby."

== Stud career ==
When Baird died at the age of 31 in 1893, his racing interests were sold, and Merry Hampton was bought for 1,150 guineas by the jockey George Barrett. Merry Hampton made very little impact as a sire, although he got a good stayer in the Alexandra Plate winner Pride. His last known foals were conceived in 1898. Merry Hampton's only lasting legacy was as the broodmare sire of Mahubah, the dam of Man o' War.

== Pedigree ==
Pedigree of Merry Hampton (GB), bay stallion, 1884
Sire Hampton (GB) 1872	Lord Clifden; 1860	Newminster	Touchstone*
Sire Hampton (GB) 1872	Lord Clifden; 1860	Newminster	Beeswing
Sire Hampton (GB) 1872	Lord Clifden; 1860	The Slave	Melbourne
Sire Hampton (GB) 1872	Lord Clifden; 1860	The Slave	Volley
Sire Hampton (GB) 1872	Lady Langden; 1868	Kettledrum	Rataplan*
Sire Hampton (GB) 1872	Lady Langden; 1868	Kettledrum	Hybla
Sire Hampton (GB) 1872	Lady Langden; 1868	Haricot	Lanercost
Sire Hampton (GB) 1872	Lady Langden; 1868	Haricot	Queen Mary*
Dam Doll Tearsheet (GB) 1877	Broomielaw; 1862	Stockwell	The Baron
Dam Doll Tearsheet (GB) 1877	Broomielaw; 1862	Stockwell	Pocahontas*
Dam Doll Tearsheet (GB) 1877	Broomielaw; 1862	Queen Mary*	Gladiator
Dam Doll Tearsheet (GB) 1877	Broomielaw; 1862	Queen Mary*	Plenipotentiary mare
Dam Doll Tearsheet (GB) 1877	Mrs Quickly; 1857	Longbow	Ithuriel*
Dam Doll Tearsheet (GB) 1877	Mrs Quickly; 1857	Longbow	Miss Bowe
Dam Doll Tearsheet (GB) 1877	Mrs Quickly; 1857	Venus	Sir Hercules
Dam Doll Tearsheet (GB) 1877	Mrs Quickly; 1857	Venus	Echo (Family: 22)

* Merry Hampton is inbred 4S x 3D to the mare Queen Mary, meaning that she appears fourth generation on the sire side of his pedigree, and third generation on the dam side of his pedigree.

* Merry Hampton is inbred 4S x 5D to the stallion Touchstone, meaning that he appears fourth generation on the sire side of his pedigree, and fifth generation (via Ithuriel) on the dam side of his pedigree.

* Merry Hampton is inbred 5S x 4D to the mare Pocahontas, meaning that she appears fifth generation (via Rataplan) on the sire side of his pedigree, and fourth generation on the dam side of his pedigree.
