= Potoooooooo =

British thoroughbred racehorse

Potoooooooo (Pot-8-Os)
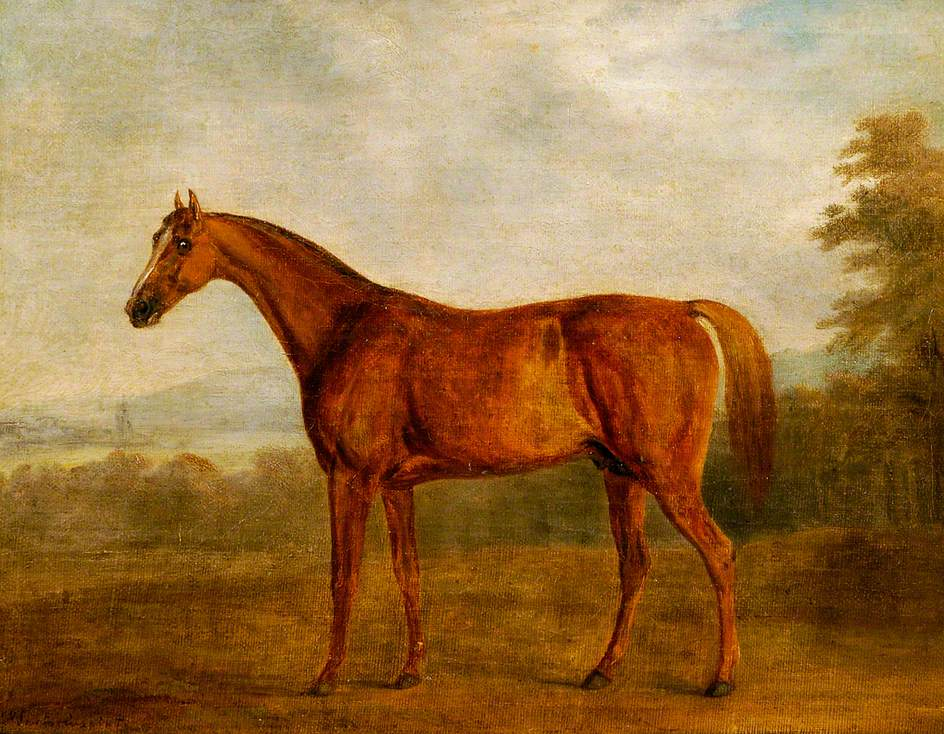
- 'Pot-8-Os', by John Nost Sartorius
- Sire: Eclipse
- Grandsire: Marske
- Dam: Sportsmistress
- Damsire: Sportsman
- Sex: Stallion
- Foaled: 1773
- Died: November 1800
- Country: Great Britain
- Colour: Chestnut
- Breeder: Willoughby Bertie, 4th Earl of Abingdon
- Owner: Richard Grosvenor, 1st Earl Grosvenor
- Record: 40 starts – 34 wins

Major wins
- 1200 Guineas Stakes (1778); Clermont Cup (1779, 1780, 1782); Jockey Club Plate (1780, 1781, 1782); October Cup (1780); Newmarket Whip (1781, 1783); Craven Stakes (1782)

Potoooooooo or variations of Pot-8-Os (1773 – November 1800) was an 18th-century British thoroughbred racehorse who won over 25 races and placed higher than some of the most prominent racehorses of his time. He went on to be an important sire, whose leading runners included Epsom Derby winners Waxy, Champion, and Tyrant. He is best known for the unusual spelling of his name, pronounced Potatoes.

== Background ==
Potoooooooo (also spelled Pot-8-Os, Pot8Os, Pot8O's, or Pot 8 Os in various sources) was a chestnut colt bred by Willoughby Bertie, 4th Earl of Abingdon, in 1773. He was sired by the undefeated Eclipse. He was the first foal out of Sportsmistress, who was sired by Warren's Sportsman and traced to Thwaites' Dun Mare from family number 38 on her dam's side.

The origin of his name has several different versions. According to the most common, Bertie intended to call the young colt "Potato" and instructed the stable boy to write the name on a feed bin. The stable boy spelled the name as "Potoooooooo" (Pot followed by 8 "o"s; that is, a failed attempt at spelling phonetically), which so amused Bertie that he adopted the spelling. Subsequent writers have used a variety of spellings that reflect the intended revised pronunciation, "Potatoes". In The Jockey Club's online database equineline.com, the name is spelled as Pot8O's. The General Stud Book uses Potoooooooo.

== Racing career ==
Potoooooooo raced from 1776 to 1783, accumulating from 28 to 34 wins from an estimated 40 starts, mostly in 4-mile races on Newmarket's Beacon course. In 1776, he won a 100 guinea sweepstakes at Newmarket's first spring meeting. In 1777 at age four, he finished second in two Newmarket races for 4-year-old colts, third at Nottingham, and fifth in the Great Subscription Purse at York.

In 1778 at age five, Potoooooooo was entered in the 1200 Guineas Stakes at Newmarket's first spring meeting. During the race, Bertie sold the horse to Richard Grosvenor, 1st Earl Grosvenor for 1,500 guineas. Potoooooooo won the race and subsequently raced under Grosvenor's yellow and black silks. His subsequent wins that year included the 140 guineas subscription purse at the second spring meeting, a subscription at Ipswich, a £50 purse at Swaffham and another subscription race at Newmarket's second October meeting.

In 1779 at age six, he won a number of races at Newmarket, including the Gold Cup, a walkover for the Clermont Cup and the October Cup. In 1780, he again won several races at Newmarket, including the 140 guineas subscription purse where he beat King Fergus, the Jockey Club Plate and another walkover in the Clermont Cup. He also raced twice against Sir Charles Davers' Woodpecker, Herod's best son from these years, winning once.

In 1781, he won the Jockey Club Plate and the Whip, both by walkover, plus a 400 guineas sweep. In October, he received 85 guineas "by common consent" as a reward for not starting in the 140 guineas subscription purse. In 1782, he had a third walkover in the Clermont, won the Jockey Club Plate for a third time, and was victorious in the Craven Stakes, beating thirteen mostly younger horses. In 1783 at age ten, he won the Whip at Newmarket, but lost a 300 guineas match race to Assassin, who had won the previous year's Derby, and a 200 guineas sweepstakes.

== Stud career ==
In 1784, Potoooooooo was retired to stud at Oxcroft Farm near Balsham, Cambridgeshire, where he mostly covered mares owned by Grosvenor. For other mares, his stud fee was initially 5 guineas, gradually increasing to 21 guineas. In 1796, he was relocated to Upper Hare Park near Newmarket. During his career, Potoooooooo sired 172 winners of £61,971. His leading offspring and their descendants include:

- Nightshade (foaled 1785), winner of the Oaks in 1788
- Asparagus (1787), a good runner and sire of Rhoda (winner of the 1000 Guineas in 1816)
- Waxy (1790), who won the Derby Stakes in 1793 and ten other races. Waxy was the leading sire in 1810 and is responsible for the continuation of the Eclipse sire line to the present day. His offspring include Waxy Pope, Whalebone, and Spaniel.
- Sister to Edwin (1794), taproot mare of Family 3-i and the subsequent branch Family 3-l
- Champion (1797), the first horse to win both the Derby and the St. Leger Stakes (in 1800)
- Tyrant (1799), Derby winner in 1802
- Parasol (1800), who won many races and was a dam of Classic winners Pindarrie (2000 Guineas) and Pastille (Oaks and 2000 Guineas)
- Mandane (1800), taproot mare of Family 11-g. Dam of Manuella (1812 Oaks Stakes), Altisidora (St Leger), Lottery (Doncaster Cup) and Brutandorf (Chester Cup)

== Death and legacy ==
Potoooooooo died in November 1800 at the age of 27 and was buried at Hare Park. Some 200 years later, his skeleton was uncovered when a tree blew over. The skeleton is on display at the Kings Yard Galleries of the National Horseracing Museum in Newmarket.

He is mentioned in the poem Seeing the famous Whip:

Not so—the glory of The Whip shall last,
(If I may judge the future by the past).
While grow on land Potoooooooo, sharks in seas;
While Drone give troubles to the lab'ring bees.

— Seeing the famous Whip, The Illustrated Sporting and Dramatic News, 8th September 2016

== Sire line tree ==
- Potoooooooo
  - Coriander
  - Alderman
  - Asparagus
    - Teddy the Grinder
  - Champion
  - Tyrant
  - Vespasian
  - Worthy
    - Podargus
    - Musician
  - Waxy
    - Shock
    - Pavilion
    - Sir Walter Raleigh
    - Sasenagh
    - Ipswich
    - Waxy Pope
      - The Dandy
      - Prendergast
      - Starch
        - Zimmerman
      - Canteen
      - Sligo
      - Trumpeter
      - Mount Eagle
      - Skylark
      - The Cardinal
    - Crispin
    - Whalebone
      - Waverley
        - The Saddler
        - Locomotive
        - The Bard
        - Don John
      - Peter Fin
      - Moses
      - Longwaist
        - Vestment
        - Doncaster
      - Camel
        - Abbas Mirza
        - Touchstone
        - Caravan
        - Wintonian
        - Launcelot
        - Fiammetta
        - Simoom
        - Misdeal
      - Chateau Margaux
      - Flexible
      - Stumps
        - Viator
      - Lap-Dog
      - Defence
        - Tipple Cider
        - Bulwark
        - Barrier
        - Palladium
        - The Emperor
      - Merman
      - Sir Hercules
        - Arthur
        - Birdcatcher
        - The Hydra
        - Hyllus
        - The Corsair
        - Coronation
        - Robert de Gorham
        - Newcourt
        - Faugh-a-Ballagh
        - Discount
        - Hagley
        - Hartneitstein
        - Hotspur
        - Landgrave
        - Knight Of The Shire
        - Gemma di Vergy
        - Gunboat
        - Lifeboat
        - Sir Hercules
      - The Exquisite
      - Cetus
      - Spaniel
      - Vestris
        - Mathew
      - The Sea
        - Freetrader
    - Woful
      - Theodore
      - Wanton
    - Blucher
    - Quinola
    - Whisker
      - Abron
      - Caccia Patti
      - Mustachio
      - Swiss
      - Catterick
        - Jerry
      - Memnon
        - King Cole
        - Czudo
        - Sygnal
      - Coulon
      - Economist
        - The General
        - Normanby
        - Harkaway
        - Economy
        - Doctor Sangado
        - Mulligatawney
        - Condor
        - Lord George
        - Flying Buck
      - The Colonel
        - D'Egville
        - Cap-a-Pie
        - Chatham
      - Emancipation
      - Lawrie Todd
      - Perion
      - Whisker
        - Jorrocks
    - Milton
    - Inferior
    - Anti-Gallican

== Pedigree ==
Potoooooooo was sired by the undefeated Eclipse, who was also a very successful stallion even though he never led the sire list. His dam was Sportsmistress, whose dam Golden Locks was inbred 2 x 2 to Crab – he was both her maternal and paternal grandsire. Sportsmistress would produce a total of 11 foals including Sir Thomas, winner of the 1788 Derby.

Pedigree of Potoooooooo, chestnut horse, 1773
Sire Eclipse 1764	Marske; 1750	Squirt	Bartlett's Childers
Sire Eclipse 1764	Marske; 1750	Squirt	Sister to Old Country Wench*
Sire Eclipse 1764	Marske; 1750	The Ruby Mare	Hutton's Blacklegs
Sire Eclipse 1764	Marske; 1750	The Ruby Mare	Bay Bolton Mare
Sire Eclipse 1764	Spiletta; 1749	Regulus	Godolphin Arabian*
Sire Eclipse 1764	Spiletta; 1749	Regulus	Grey Robinson*
Sire Eclipse 1764	Spiletta; 1749	Mother Western	Easby Snake
Sire Eclipse 1764	Spiletta; 1749	Mother Western	Old Montagu Mare
Dam Sportsmistress 1765	Sportsman; 1753	Cade	Godolphin Arabian*
Dam Sportsmistress 1765	Sportsman; 1753	Cade	Roxana
Dam Sportsmistress 1765	Sportsman; 1753	Silvertail	Heneages Whitenose
Dam Sportsmistress 1765	Sportsman; 1753	Silvertail	Rattle Mare
Dam Sportsmistress 1765	Golden Locks; 1758	Oroonoko	Crab*
Dam Sportsmistress 1765	Golden Locks; 1758	Oroonoko	Miss Slamerkin
Dam Sportsmistress 1765	Golden Locks; 1758	Crab Mare	Crab*
Dam Sportsmistress 1765	Golden Locks; 1758	Crab Mare	Partner Mare (family: 38)

- Potoooooooo is inbred 4S x 4D to the stallion Godolphin Arabian, meaning that he appears fourth generation on the sire side of his pedigree, and fourth generation on the dam side of his pedigree.
- Potoooooooo is inbred 4D x 4D to the stallion Crab, meaning that he appears fourth generation twice on the dam side of his pedigree.
- Potoooooooo is inbred 4S x 5D to the mare Old Country Wench, meaning that she appears fourth generation on the sire side of his pedigree, and fifth generation (via Grey Robinson) on the dam side of his pedigree.

== See also ==
- List of racehorses
- Numeronym
