= Whalebone (horse) =

British Thoroughbred racehorse

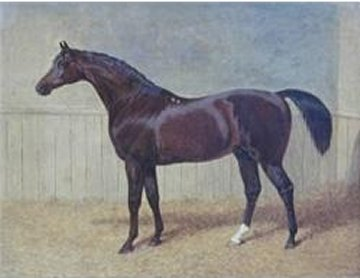
- Whalebone in a painting by John Frederick Herring, Sr., c. 1820
- Sire: Waxy
- Grandsire: Potoooooooo
- Dam: Penelope
- Damsire: Trumpator
- Sex: Stallion
- Foaled: 1807
- Died: 6 February 1831 (aged 23–24)
- Country: United Kingdom of Great Britain and Ireland
- Colour: Bay
- Breeder: Duke of Grafton
- Owner: 1) 3rd Duke of Grafton; 2) 4th Duke of Grafton; 3) Mr. Ladbroke; 4) Lord Egremont
- Trainer: Robert Robson
- Record: 20:14-2-3

Major wins
- Epsom Derby (1810)

Honours
- Leading sire in Great Britain and Ireland (1826 and 1827)

Whalebone (1807 – 6 February 1831) was a British Thoroughbred racehorse that won the 1810 Epsom Derby and was a successful sire of racehorses and broodmares in the 1820s. Whalebone and his full-brother Whisker were produced by the prolific and important broodmare Penelope, and they contributed to the perpetuation of the genetic line (tail-male) of their sire Waxy and grandsire Eclipse into the 20th century. Whalebone raced until he was six years old and was retired to stud at Petworth in 1815. Whalebone sired the Derby winners Lap-dog, Spaniel and may have been the sire of Moses. Other notable sons are Sir Hercules and Camel, the sire of Touchstone. Whalebone died in 1831 at the age of 24 of hemorrhage after covering a mare.

== Background ==
Whalebone was bred by the Duke of Grafton in 1807 at his Euston Hall stud farm near Newmarket. He was sired by the 1793 Epsom Derby winner Waxy out of the mare Penelope (foaled in 1798), both owned by the Duke. As a racehorse, Penelope was a contemporary of the 1801 Derby-winning filly Eleanor, beating her several times, and was half-sister to 1809 Derby winner Pope and the mares Pope Joan (both sired by Waxy), Parasol (Partisan's dam) and Prudence. Penelope was a prolific and influential broodmare, producing eight full-siblings to Whalebone that achieved success on the turf. She produced 13 foals between 1806 and 1823, all with names beginning with the letter W. Whalebone was her second foal and his full-siblings include Web, Woful, Wilful, Wire, Whisker, Wildfire and Windfall. Penelope died in 1824.

Whalebone was a mottled bay or brown colt that stood 15.2 hands high with "short legs, high-bred nostrils and very prominent eyes." He was a "plainish looking" horse with a "Turkish-pony look" and thick neck and body that were not as well-proportioned as those of his full-brother Whisker. Whalebone was reportedly one of the smallest horses Waxy ever produced. In the words of his groom, Dryman, "he was the lowest and longest, and most-double jointed horse, with the best legs—eight and a half below the knee—and worst feet I ever saw in my life."

== Racing career ==
=== 1810: three-year-old season ===
Whalebone's first career start occurred on 9 May at Newmarket where Whalebone ran a dead heat and won the 50-guinea Newmarket Stakes, beating the colts Brother to Burleigh (Treasurer) and Eccleston while carrying 119 pounds.

On 7 June at Epsom, Whalebone won the Derby Stakes, beating The Dandy, Eccleston and a field of eight other horses after leading from the start in a race where he "was never headed." He was the race favorite at 5 to 2, and his Derby win was a consecutive victory for the Duke of Grafton who had won the race the previous year with his colt Pope. Pope was also sired by Waxy and was out of Whalebone's maternal grandam Prunella.

At the First October Meeting at Newmarket, Whalebone received a forfeiture of 60 guineas from Mr. Shakespear's colt Nuncio and walked over for a 25-guinea subscription stakes. On 29 October at Houghton, Whalebone was beaten in a match race by the colt Treasurer while carrying seven more pounds than his opponent. A few days later at the same meeting Whalebone secured two wins in match races, beating Major Wheatley's colt Sir Marrinel while carrying eight pounds more than his opponent and beating the colt Thorn a day later. He also received forfeitures of 100 guineas from Mr. Shakespear's Knave of Clubs and an unspecified amount from G. H. Cavendish's colt Florival.

=== 1811: four-year-old season ===
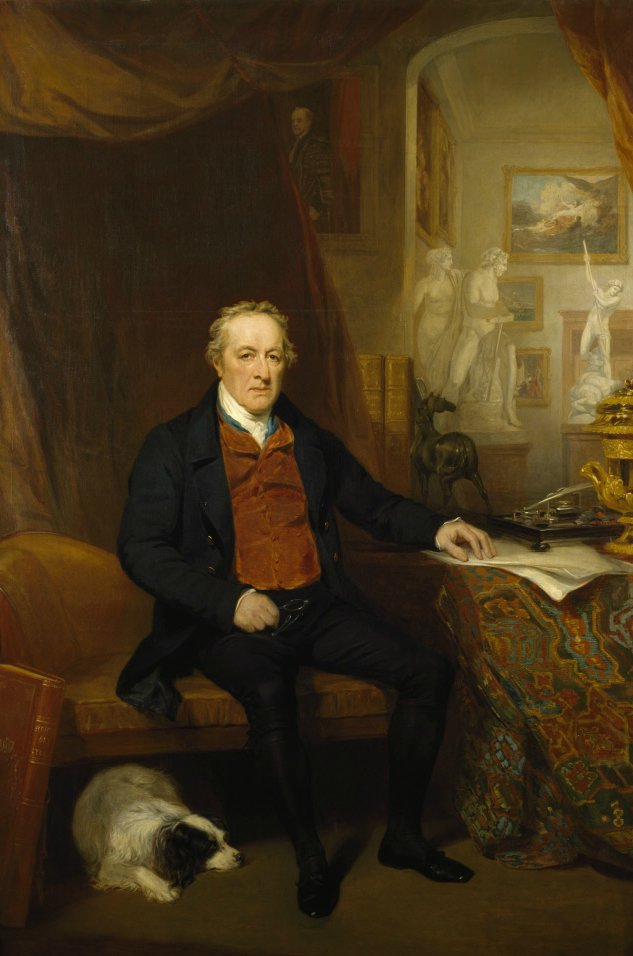
Whalebone was owned by the Earl of Egremont after his racing career and stood his entire breeding career at Petworth House. The horse statue on the table to the right of Egremont depicts Whalebone.

In May, Whalebone received 60 guineas forfeiture from Mr. Henry Vansittart's colt Gloster. On 6 August at Huntingdon, Whalebone was third in the Portholme Stakes to the filly Barrosa and the colt Bolter.

For the Newmarket Trial Stakes on 30 September, Whalebone was third to the colt Florival and the filly Sprightly. Whalebone won the 100-guinea King's Plate a few days later, and at the Second October Meeting, received a forfeit from major Wilson's colt Erebus and was unplaced for the Cheveley Stakes. In November he received 140 guineas forfeit from Mr. Shakespear's colt Tumbler.

=== 1812–1813: five and six-year-old seasons ===
At the Newmarket-Craven Meeting, Whalebone was beaten in a match race by Major Wilson's colt Bolter. In April at Newmarket, Whalebone won the 100-guinea King's Plate and was third in a 300-guinea sweepstakes race to the colts Trophonius (not the 2000 Guineas winner) and Invalid. In July at Newmarket, he won a £50 race and paid a 10-guinea forfeit for a handicap sweepstakes. On 9 September at Northampton, Whalebone won a 100-guinea gold cup race against four other horses.

Whalebone was sold by the Duke of Grafton in October 1812 to Mr. Ladbroke for 700 guineas. Whalebone's first start under Ladbroke's ownership was on 26 October at the Houghton meeting where he won a match race against Mr. Lake's two-year-old colt Turner. Whalebone won an additional match race against the Lord Sackville's horse Pan at the same meeting. Whalebone ran three times in 1813, winning the 100-guinea His Majesty's Plate on 8 June at Guildford against three other horses and the Lewes His Majesty's Plate on 5 August. On 7 August, in what was ultimately the last start of Whalebone's racing career, he won the 60-guinea Ladies' Plate against Lord Somerset's colt Offa's Dyke.

=== Interim ===
Ladbroke reportedly "took a dislike to Whalebone" and sold him in 1814 for 510 guineas to Lord Egremont. Whalebone was initially thought to be a poor stud prospect due to his small stature and Lord Egremont put him back into training. However, the seven-year-old horse had become "dangerous to ride," having "acquired the habit of rearing to an alarming extent" and would frequently "knock his hooves together like a pair of castanettes." Consequently, he was permanently retired from racing and became a breeding stallion for Lord Egremont in 1815.

== Stud career ==
Whalebone began his stud career at Petworth in Sussex in 1815 for a fee of 10 guineas per mare and one guinea for the groom alongside the stallions Octavius and Canopus. His fee was 20 guineas per mare in 1830, the year preceding his death, and he stood at Petworth for the entirety of his 16-year stud career. Whalebone sired The Derby winners Lap-dog, Spaniel and may have been the sire of Moses. Other notable sons are Sir Hercules and Camel, the sire of Touchstone.

In his later years, Whalebone developed chronic foot problems due to his poor hoof conformation. His groom, Dryman, commented on his condition, "His feet were so contracted and high on the heel, and became so Chinese boot-like and full of fever at last, that he never moved out of his box."

Whalebone "broke a blood vessel" on 5 February 1831 while breeding the mare Ogress. He died of this injury the following day on 6 February 1831. Ogress foaled a bay filly by Whalebone in 1832, later named Eleanor, the last foal sired by Whalebone.

== Sire line tree ==
Descendants of Whalebone (click to show)
- Whalebone
  - Waverley
    - The Saddler
      - The Provost
      - Miles Boy
      - Sylvan
    - Locomotive
    - The Bard
    - Don John
      - Iago
        - Bonnie Scotland
      - The Ban
  - Moses
  - Peter Fin
  - Longwaist
    - Vestment
    - Doncaster
  - Camel
    - Abbas Mirza
      - The Shah
        - Philip Shah
    - Touchstone
      - Auckland
      - Cotherstone
        - Stilton
        - Speed The Plough
        - Pumicestone
        - Woodcote
        - Spencer
        - Glenmasson
      - Ithuriel
        - Longbow
      - Orlando
        - Teddington
        - King Pepin
        - Orpheus
        - Ninnyhammer
        - Orestes
        - Boiardo
        - Marsyas
        - Scythian
        - Duke Rollo
        - Fazzoletto
        - Porto Rico
        - King Of The Forest
        - The British Remedy
        - Chevalier d'Industrie
        - Claude Lorraine
        - Zuyder Zee
        - Eclipse
        - Fitzroland
        - Gin
        - Trumpeter
        - Crater
        - Canary
        - Diophantus
        - Wrestler
        - Chattanooga
        - Liddington
        - Temple
        - The Knave
      - Annandale
        - Balrownie
      - Paragone
      - Poynton
        - Peto
      - William Tell
        - Archer
      - Flatcatcher
      - Surplice
        - Florin
      - Nunnykirk
        - Potocki
      - The Italian
      - Mountain Deer
        - Drogheda
        - Mount Zion
        - Roebuck
        - Croagh Patrick
      - Newminster
        - Daniel
        - Musjid
        - Newcastle
        - Joey Jones
        - Kildonan
        - Oldminster
        - Stanton
        - Adventurer
        - Yorkminster
        - Lord Clifden
        - Meuzzin
        - Onesander
        - Pratique
        - Cambuscan
        - Cathedral
        - Midnight Mass
        - The Beadle
        - Bedminster
        - Heir-At-Law
        - Hurrah
        - Laseretto
        - Victorious
        - Crown Prince
        - Laneret
        - Strathconan
        - Vespasian
        - Hermit
        - Kidderminster
        - Bogue Homa
        - Cardinal York
        - Conjuror
      - Young Touchstone
      - Vindex
        - Victor
        - The Avenger
      - Claret
        - Scots Grey
      - Lord Of The Isles
        - Dundee
        - Scottish Chief
        - MacDonald
      - Artillary
        - Revolver
        - Kyrle Daly
      - Lord Of The Hills
        - Glencoe
      - Tournament
        - Retrousse
        - Sabre
      - Wamba
    - Caravan
      - Souvenir
    - Wintonian
    - Launcelot
    - Fiammetta
    - Simoom
      - Barbarian
    - Misdeal
  - Chateau Margaux
  - Flexible
  - Stumps
    - Viator
  - Lap-Dog
  - Defence
    - Tipple Cider
    - Bulwark
    - Barrier
    - Palladium
    - The Emperor
      - Allez Y Gaiement
      - Baroncino
      - Lindor
      - Monarque
        - Hospodar
        - Le Marechal
        - Gedeon
        - Gladiateur
          - Lord Gough
          - Highborn
        - Le Manderin
        - Auguste
        - Marengo
        - Young Monarque
        - Longchamp
        - Patricien
        - Trocadero
          - Narcisse
            - Chene Royal
          - Pourqoui
          - Bariolet
          - Satory
          - Fra Diavolo
            - Lausanne
            - Solitaire
          - Silex
          - Extra
        - Le Bosphore
        - Le Sarrazin
        - Nelusco
        - Ouragan
        - Boulagne
        - Consul
          - Nougat
            - Farfadet
              - Ermak
                - Rataplan
          - Kilt
          - Albion
          - Archiduc
          - Fripon
            - Illinois
            - Le Pompon
              - Prestige
              - Biniou
        - Pandour
        - Don Carlos
        - General
        - Henry
        - Feu D'Amour
        - Novateur
  - Merman
  - Sir Hercules
    - Arthur
    - Birdcatcher
      - Ballinkeele
      - Mickey Free
        - Fenian
        - Milesian
      - King Fisher
      - The Baron
        - Chief Baron Nicholson
        - Stockwell
        - Rataplan
        - Tonnerre des Indes
        - Remunerateur
        - Isolier
        - Fort-a-Bras
        - Zouave
        - Costa
        - Baronella
      - Bryan O'Linn
      - Caurouch
      - Chanticleer
        - Vengeance
        - Cock Robin
      - Marquis
        - Blood Royal
      - Rory O'More
      - Augur
      - Daniel O'Rourke
        - Sledmere
        - Dalby
        - Ladykirk
      - Womersley
        - Amati
        - Black Tommy
        - Condrington
        - General Willams
        - St Giles
        - Marignon
        - Provacateur
      - Lord Fauconberg
        - Royal Oak Day
        - Rama
      - Bandy
      - Gamekeeper
      - Grey Plover
        - Sir Robert Peel
        - Golden Plover
      - Knight Of St George
        - Dan O'Connell
        - Knight Of St Patrick
        - Melbourne Jr
        - Knighthood
      - Papageno
        - Master George
      - Warlock
        - Vaucresson
        - War
        - Tynedale
      - Saunterer
        - Digby Grand
        - Saunterer
        - Regal
      - Red Eagle
      - Oxford
        - The Student
        - Oxonian
        - Blenheim
        - Sterling
        - Wilberforce
        - Nuneham
        - Playfair
        - Chandos
        - Standard
    - The Hydra
      - Chief Justice
      - Mark Tapely
    - Hyllus
    - The Corsair
    - Coronation
    - Robert de Gorham
      - Sir Colin
    - Newcourt
      - Cotswold
    - Faugh-a-Ballagh
      - Goldfinder
      - Le Juif
      - Ethelwolf
      - Father Thames
      - Lucio
      - Morning Star
      - Ethelbert
        - Big Ben
        - King Of Kent
        - Adalbert
      - Barrel
      - Fearless
      - Knight Of The Garter
      - Leamington
        - Enquirer
        - Longfellow
        - Lynchburg
        - Lyttleton
        - Eolus
        - Reform
        - Aristides
        - Hyder Ali
        - James A
        - Rhadamanthus
        - Parole
        - Stratford
        - Harold
        - Sensation
        - Iroquois
        - Saunterer
        - Onandaga
        - Powhattan
      - The Brewer
      - Master Bagot
        - Lottery
      - The Hadji
        - Terror
      - Ben Brace
      - Blackthorn
      - Knight Of The Blaze
      - Garibaldi
      - Pretendant
      - L'Africain
      - Armagnac
      - Jarnicoton
    - Discount
    - Hagley
    - Hartneitstein
    - Hotspur
    - Landgrave
    - Knight Of The Shire
    - Gemma di Vergy
      - Lucifer
        - Don Juan
      - Rococo
        - Old Buck
    - Gunboat
      - Torpedo
    - Lifeboat
      - The Mariner
        - Jolly Tar
    - Sir Hercules
  - The Exquisite
  - Cetus
  - Spaniel
  - Vestris
    - Mathew
  - The Sea
    - Freetrader

== Pedigree ==
Pedigree of Whalebone (GB), Bay colt, 1807
| Sire Waxy (GB) Bay, 1790 | Potoooooooo; 1773 | Eclipse | Marske |
| Sire Waxy (GB) Bay, 1790 | Potoooooooo; 1773 | Eclipse | Spilletta |
| Sire Waxy (GB) Bay, 1790 | Potoooooooo; 1773 | Sportsmistress | Sportsman |
| Sire Waxy (GB) Bay, 1790 | Potoooooooo; 1773 | Sportsmistress | Golden Locks |
| Sire Waxy (GB) Bay, 1790 | Maria; 1777 | Herod* | Tartar* |
| Sire Waxy (GB) Bay, 1790 | Maria; 1777 | Herod* | Cypron* |
| Sire Waxy (GB) Bay, 1790 | Maria; 1777 | Lisette | Snap* |
| Sire Waxy (GB) Bay, 1790 | Maria; 1777 | Lisette | Miss Windsor |
| Dam Penelope (GB) Bay, 1798 | Trumpator; 1782 | Conductor | Matchem |
| Dam Penelope (GB) Bay, 1798 | Trumpator; 1782 | Conductor | Snap Mare* |
| Dam Penelope (GB) Bay, 1798 | Trumpator; 1782 | Brunette | Squirrel |
| Dam Penelope (GB) Bay, 1798 | Trumpator; 1782 | Brunette | Dove |
| Dam Penelope (GB) Bay, 1798 | Prunella; 1788 | Highflyer | Herod* |
| Dam Penelope (GB) Bay, 1798 | Prunella; 1788 | Highflyer | Rachel |
| Dam Penelope (GB) Bay, 1798 | Prunella; 1788 | Promise | Snap* |
| Dam Penelope (GB) Bay, 1798 | Prunella; 1788 | Promise | Julia (Family 1-o) |

* Whalebone is inbred 3S x 4D to the stallion Herod, meaning that he appears third generation on the sire side of his pedigree, and fourth generation on the dam side of his pedigree.

* Whalebone is inbred 4S x 5D x 4D to the stallion Snap, meaning that he appears fourth generation on the sire side of his pedigree, and fifth generation (via Snap mare) and fourth generation on the dam side of his pedigree.
