= Spaniel (horse) =

British-bred Thoroughbred racehorse

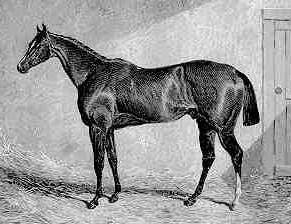
- From The New Sporting Magazine (1831)
- Sire: Whalebone
- Grandsire: Waxy
- Dam: Canopus mare (1812)
- Damsire: Canopus
- Sex: Stallion
- Foaled: 1828
- Country: United Kingdom of Great Britain and Ireland
- Colour: Bay
- Breeder: Lord Egremont
- Owner: Viscount Lowther
- Trainer: Joe Rogers
- Record: 19:8-3-1
- Earnings: £3,675

Major wins
- Epsom Derby (1831)

Spaniel (1828–1833) was a British Thoroughbred racehorse. In a career that lasted from July 1830 to early 1833 he ran eighteen times and won nine races. After an unsuccessful season as a two-year-old he made significant improvement in 1831 to win his first three races, culminating in The Derby. Spaniel failed to win again for over a year but then recovered to win five races on Welsh racecourses in 1832. He died after being injured on his first start as a five-year-old in 1833.

== Background ==
Spaniel was described as a "light, bright, airy little" bay horse with a white stripe and a white sock on his hind leg bred by George Wyndham, 3rd Earl of Egremont. He was the full brother of the 1826 Derby winner Lap-dog, being sired by Whalebone out of Egremont's unnamed Canopus mare. In addition to the two Derby winners, the Canopus mare also produced Fanchon, the dam of the 1000 Guineas winner Cara. Spaniel's sire, Whalebone won the 1810 Derby and thirteen other races before becoming a successful and important stallion. He was British Champion sire in 1826 and 1827 and through his son Sir Hercules, is the male-line ancestor of most modern Thoroughbreds.

Spaniel was not an impressive young horse, being small and weak and was sold by Egremont, either as a foal or as a yearling to Viscount Lowther for 150 guineas (one source claims the price was 500 guineas). According to one version of the story, the deal was done over the dinner table. Lowther had the colt trained by Joe Rogers.

== Racing career ==
=== 1830: two-year-old season ===
As a two-year-old, Spaniel ran four times without success, with all of his runs being at Newmarket. He began his racing career on 13 May in a Sweepstakes over six furlongs. He started at odds of 4/1 and finished second of the seven runners to a colt named Zany. Two months later he finished behind Zany again, on this occasion when finishing unplaced in the July Stakes.

He returned in October when he finished unplaced ("in the ruck") in a £50 race won by an unnamed colt by Emilus. His final start of the year came in November when he ran in the Nursery Stakes, a handicap race for two-year-olds over one mile. He started 5/4 favourite under a weight of 110 pounds, but finished a remote third behind Naiad. The American Turf Register and Sporting Magazine commented that a less patient trainer than Joe Rogers would not have persevered with what they described as a "little, scratching thing."

=== 1831: three-year-old season ===
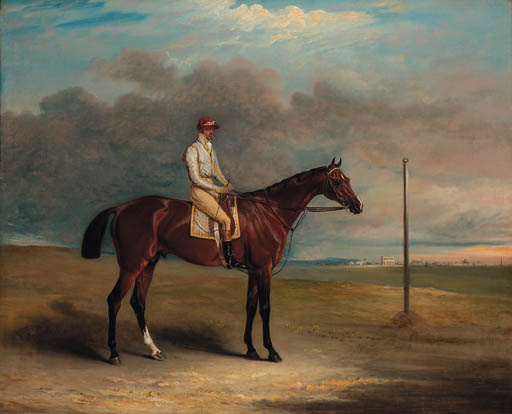
Spaniel and jockey, by John E. Ferneley.

Spaniel recorded his first win on his three-year-old debut on 4 April. Spaniel was still technically a two-year-old in this race, as horses at this time had their official "birthdays" on 1 May: the change to 1 January came in 1834. He carried 94 pounds in a one-mile handicap over the Abingdon Mile course at Newmarket and won easily from thirteen opponents. After this win Spaniel appeared in the betting lists for the Epsom Derby, but was not considered one of the leading contenders. On 17 May, two days before the Derby he started at odds of 1/4 in the Shirley Stakes on the first day of the Epsom meeting. Although he won very easily from three opponents he did not appear to impress the bookmakers, who moved his odds for the Derby from 30/1 out to 50/1. Confidence in Spaniel faded to such an extent that both his trainer Joe Rogers and his jockey Will Wheatley attempted to cancel the bets they had placed on him. Wheatley succeeded in cancelling a £25 bet which would have won him £1,000.

On 19 May Spaniel started at odds of 50/1 for the Derby in a field of twenty-three runners. The favourite was Riddlesworth, who had won the 2000 Guineas. Despite the puzzling fact that his owner Lord Jersey "declared to win" with his other runner, an outsider named Blunder, Riddlesworth was the subject of extremely heavy wagering and started at odds of 4/6, making him one of the shortest priced favourites in the history of the race up to that time. Spaniel, despite being the smallest horse in the race, looked very impressive in the paddock before the race and when cantering to the start he moved exceptionally well "as though... he trod on air", despite the extremely hard ground. After several false starts and delays the race got under way, and after a fast start, almost all the jockeys restrained their mounts, and the pace was extremely slow. The gallop was so gentle that jockeys could be seen "gossiping to each other" and Wheatley later commented that Spaniel could have sustained such a pace "right away to London". The lack of a testing gallop meant that almost all of the runners were still in contention turning into the straight and the race devolved into a sprint over the last quarter mile. Spaniel produced the best acceleration to take the lead in the closing stages and win quite easily from Riddlesworth, who appeared to be disadvantaged by the exaggerated waiting tactics employed by his jockey, George Edwards. The winner's name and odds caused the New Sporting Magazine to comment that the heavy gamblers had been bitten by the "little dog" who had "run like mad".

Spaniel did not run again for more than four months before starting favourite for the Trial Stakes at Newmarket on 3 October. He led for much of the way but was overtaken in the closing stages and finished second to the filly Camarine. On his final start of the year he finished unplaced behind Lucetta in the Audley End Stakes over one and three quarter miles on 4 November.

=== 1832: four-year-old season ===
Spaniel began his four-year-old season with three defeats. He was unplaced in the Oatlands Stakes at Newmarket on 25 April, and unplaced again in a Plate race at Ascot on 20 June. Eight days later he ran in the Gold Cup at Hampton racecourse. This race was run in heats. This was an old-fashioned form of racing in which the horses ran twice over the same course. If a horse won both heats it took the prize: otherwise the two heat-winners had a deciding run-off. Spaniel finished second in both heats to a three-year-old named Sluggard.

Spaniel was then put up for sale and bought by a Mr Meyrick. He was sent to race in Wales where he faced less demanding opposition and won five of his remaining six races in 1832. On 7 August he won a £50 Plate in heats at Brecon and on 12 September he was sent to Carmarthen where he won the Tradesman's Plate in heats and the Dynevor Stakes later the same day. On 26 September at Brecon he ran six times (at least) in one day as he contested three separate "heat" races. He was beaten in the Ladies' Plate, but then won the Members' Plate and ended the day by winning a handicap race.

=== 1833: five-year-old season ===
On his first start as a five-year-old, Spaniel broke down injured in the first heat of the Canterbury Stakes on 31 August. He did not recover from the injury, and died later in the year.

== Pedigree ==
Pedigree of Spaniel (GB), bay stallion, 1828
Sire Whalebone (GB) 1807	Waxy; 1790	Potoooooooo	Eclipse*
Sire Whalebone (GB) 1807	Waxy; 1790	Potoooooooo	Sportsmistress
Sire Whalebone (GB) 1807	Waxy; 1790	Maria	Herod*
Sire Whalebone (GB) 1807	Waxy; 1790	Maria	Lisette
Sire Whalebone (GB) 1807	Penelope; 1798	Trumpator	Conductor
Sire Whalebone (GB) 1807	Penelope; 1798	Trumpator	Brunette
Sire Whalebone (GB) 1807	Penelope; 1798	Prunella	Highflyer*
Sire Whalebone (GB) 1807	Penelope; 1798	Prunella	Promise
Dam Canopus mare (GB) 1812	Canopus; 1803	Gohanna	Mercury*
Dam Canopus mare (GB) 1812	Canopus; 1803	Gohanna	Sister to Challenger*
Dam Canopus mare (GB) 1812	Canopus; 1803	Colibri	Woodpecker*
Dam Canopus mare (GB) 1812	Canopus; 1803	Colibri	Camilla
Dam Canopus mare (GB) 1812	Young Woodpecker mare 1804	Young Woodpecker	Woodpecker*
Dam Canopus mare (GB) 1812	Young Woodpecker mare 1804	Young Woodpecker	Eclipse mare*
Dam Canopus mare (GB) 1812	Young Woodpecker mare 1804	Fractious	Mercury*
Dam Canopus mare (GB) 1812	Young Woodpecker mare 1804	Fractious	Woodpecker mare* (Family:3)

* Spaniel is inbred 4D x 4D x 5D to the stallion Woodpecker, meaning that he appears fourth generation twice and fifth generation once (via Woodpecker mare) on the dam side of his pedigree.

* Spaniel is inbred 4D x 4D to the stallion Mercury, meaning that he appears fourth generation twice on the dam side of his pedigree.

* Spaniel is inbred 4S x 5S x 5D x 5D x 5D x 6D to the stallion Herod, meaning that he appears fourth generation and fifth generation (via Highflyer) on the sire side of his pedigree, and fifth generation thrice (via sister to Challenger, and Woodpecker [x2]) and sixth generation once (via Woodpecker mare) on the dam side of his pedigree.

* Spaniel is inbred 4S x 5D x 5D x 5D to the stallion Eclipse, meaning that he appears fourth generation on the sire side of his pedigree, and fifth generation thrice (Mercury [x2], and Eclipse mare) on the dam side of his pedigree.
