= Lap-dog (horse) =

British-bred Thoroughbred racehorse

- Sire: Whalebone
- Grandsire: Waxy
- Dam: Canopus mare
- Damsire: Canopus
- Sex: Stallion
- Foaled: 1823
- Country: United Kingdom of Great Britain and Ireland
- Colour: Bay
- Breeder: George Wyndham, 3rd Earl of Egremont
- Owner: Lord Egremont
- Trainer: R. Stephenson or Bird
- Record: 8:4-2-1
- Earnings: £2,180

Major wins
- Epsom Derby (1826)

Lap-dog (1823–1838) was a British Thoroughbred racehorse and sire. His racing career consisted of a single season, 1826, during which he ran eight times. After finishing unplaced on his racecourse debut, Lap-dog won his next four races including The Derby. He was retired to stud at the end of the year, but had little success as a sire of winners in England and was later exported to the United States. His name appeared in variations including Lapdog, Lap Dog and The Lap Dog.

== Background ==
Lap-dog was a small bay horse with no white markings. He was bred by his owner George Wyndham, 3rd Earl of Egremont at his stud at Petworth House. He was sired by Whalebone out of Egremont's unnamed Canopus mare, making him a full brother to the 1831 Derby winner Spaniel. In addition to the two Derby winners, the Canopus mare also produced Fanchon, the dam of the 1000 Guineas winner Cara. Whalebone won the 1810 Derby and thirteen other races before becoming a successful and important stallion. He was British Champion sire in 1826 and 1827. Through his son Sir Hercules, Whalebone is the male-line ancestor of most modern Thoroughbreds.

== Racing career ==
=== 1826: three-year-old season ===
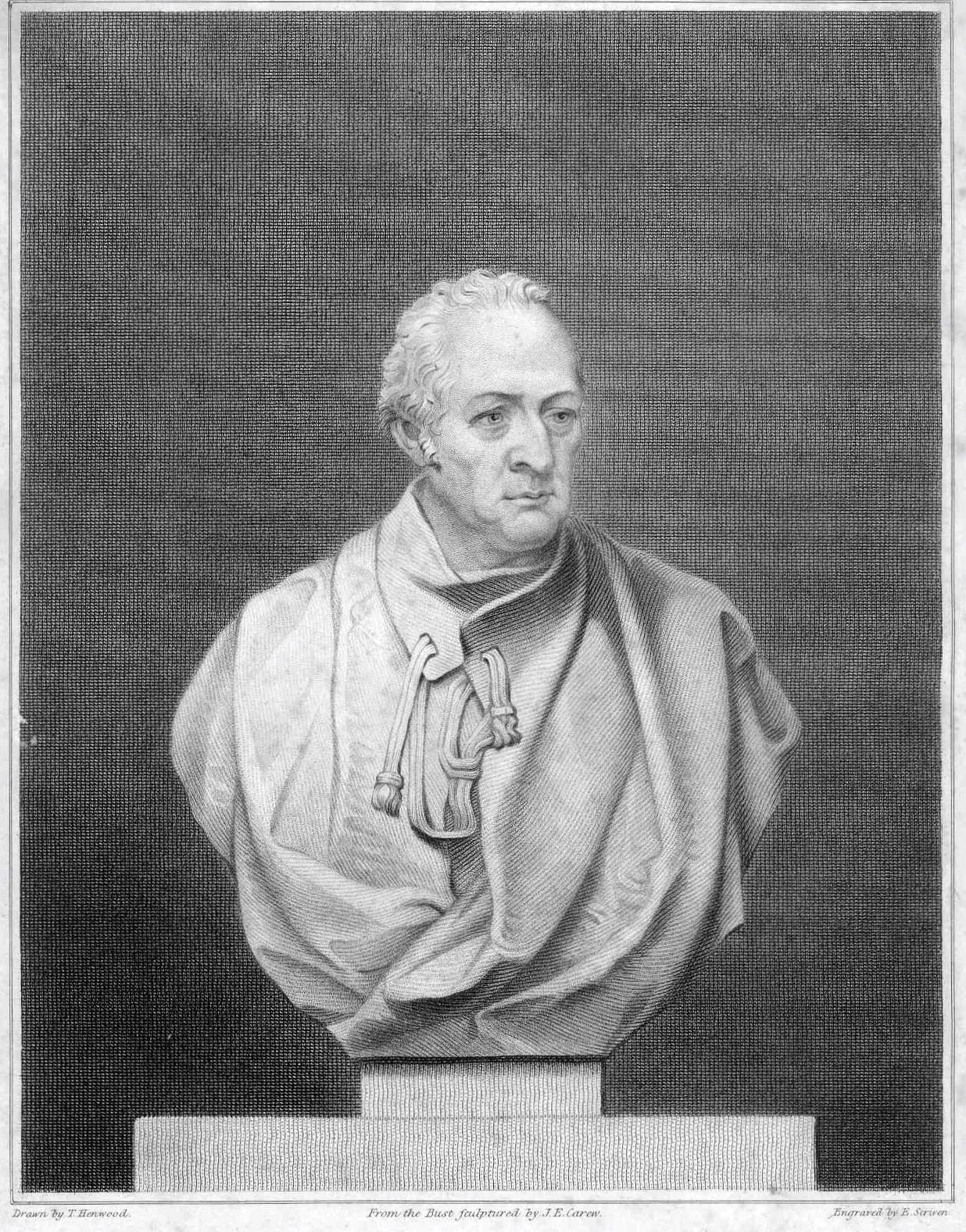
Lap-dog was the fifth Derby winner owned by Lord Egremont

On Wednesday 12 April, Lap-dog made his first appearance by running in a £50 subscription plate for two-, three- and four-year-olds at the Newmarket Craven meeting. He finished unplaced behind the odds-on favourite Muleteer. For this race, Lap-dog was technically a two-year-old as racehorses in England had their official "birthdays" on 1 May: the modern practice of calculating horses' ages from 1 January was not introduced until 1834, and did not become generally accepted until the late 1850s. On Tuesday 9 May at the Second Spring meeting at Newmarket Lap-dog recorded his first win in a £50 race for three-year-olds. He started at odds of 12/1 in a field of eleven runners and won from Lord Exeter's colt Recruit, with the favourite, Lamplighter running unplaced. In both these races his owner is recorded as being "Mr. Wyndham".

At Epsom on 25 May, Lap-dog started at odds of 50/1 for the Derby with John Forth's colt Premier being made the 5/2 favourite. The field of nineteen runners was the largest assembled for the race up to that time. Ridden by George Dockeray, he won from the previously unraced Shakespeare. The runner-up, who made most of the early running appeared to have been given a poor ride by his inexperienced jockey and was considered an unlucky loser. Lap-dog was his owner's fifth Derby winner, establishing a record that was not equalled until Tulyar gave Aga Khan III his fifth winner in 1952.

On his first race after his Derby win, Lap-dog appeared in the Scrub Sweepstakes at Brighton on 31 July and won from two opponents to whom he was conceding seven pounds. Two days later he was entered in a Sweepstakes for three-year-olds at Lewes Racecourse. He was allowed to walk over for the prize money, when the other three horses who had been entered for the race were withdrawn by their owners. The day's "racing" was a poor one: two of the three scheduled races were walkovers and the third was abandoned "for want of horses".

Lap-dog returned to Newmarket in autumn and finished second to Dervise when 8/13 favourite for the Town Plate on 4 October. At the next Newmarket meeting on 16 October he reversed the form to beat Dervise in a subscription race, but both were easily beaten by Lamplighter. The race was described by the Sporting Magazine as "bringing together the most prominent characters of their class" and as confirming Lamplighter as the best colt in the south of England. Lap-dog's final race was a £50 race for three-year-olds at the Newmarket Houghton meeting on 1 November. He finished third of the ten runners behind Shakespeare and Hobgoblin. The result strengthened the views of those who believed that Lap-dog had been lucky to beat Shakespeare at Epsom.

== Stud career ==
Lap-dog was retired to stud for the 1827 season and was based at Mr Day's stables at Houghton Down, near Stockbridge, Hampshire. His stud fee for 1828 was £7 for Thoroughbred mares, with five-shillings for the groom. His advertisement in the Racing Calendar described him as "decidedly the best horse of his year" and a "sure foal-getter". Despite these qualities, he made no real impact as a stallion. He was sold to the American breeder James Jackson and exported to stand as a stallion in Tennessee in 1835. Lap-dog died in Lincoln County, Tennessee in 1838.

== Pedigree ==
Pedigree of Lap-dog (GB), bay stallion, 1823
Sire Whalebone (GB) 1807	Waxy; 1790	Potoooooooo	Eclipse*
Sire Whalebone (GB) 1807	Waxy; 1790	Potoooooooo	Sportsmistress
Sire Whalebone (GB) 1807	Waxy; 1790	Maria	Herod*
Sire Whalebone (GB) 1807	Waxy; 1790	Maria	Lisette
Sire Whalebone (GB) 1807	Penelope; 1798	Trumpator	Conductor
Sire Whalebone (GB) 1807	Penelope; 1798	Trumpator	Brunette
Sire Whalebone (GB) 1807	Penelope; 1798	Prunella	Highflyer*
Sire Whalebone (GB) 1807	Penelope; 1798	Prunella	Promise
Dam Canopus mare(GB) 1812	Canopus; 1803	Gohanna	Mercury*
Dam Canopus mare(GB) 1812	Canopus; 1803	Gohanna	Sister to Challenger*
Dam Canopus mare(GB) 1812	Canopus; 1803	Colibri	Woodpecker*
Dam Canopus mare(GB) 1812	Canopus; 1803	Colibri	Camilla
Dam Canopus mare(GB) 1812	Young Woodpecker mare 1804	Young Woodpecker	Woodpecker*
Dam Canopus mare(GB) 1812	Young Woodpecker mare 1804	Young Woodpecker	Eclipse mare*
Dam Canopus mare(GB) 1812	Young Woodpecker mare 1804	Fractious	Mercury*
Dam Canopus mare(GB) 1812	Young Woodpecker mare 1804	Fractious	Woodpecker mare* (Family:3)

* Lap-dog is inbred 4D x 4D x 5D to the stallion Woodpecker, meaning that he appears fourth generation twice and fifth generation once (via Woodpecker mare) on the dam side of his pedigree.

* Lap-dog is inbred 4D x 4D to the stallion Mercury, meaning that he appears fourth generation twice on the dam side of his pedigree.

* Lap-dog is inbred 4S x 5S x 5D x 5D x 5D x 6D to the stallion Herod, meaning that he appears fourth generation and fifth generation (via Highflyer) on the sire side of his pedigree, and fifth generation thrice (via sister to Challenger, and Woodpecker [x2]) and sixth generation once (via Woodpecker mare) on the dam side of his pedigree.

* Lap-dog is inbred 4S x 5D x 5D x 5D to the stallion Eclipse, meaning that he appears fourth generation on the sire side of his pedigree, and fifth generation thrice (Mercury [x2], and Eclipse mare) on the dam side of his pedigree.
