= 1887 Grand National =

English steeplechase horse race

- Grand National
- Location: Aintree
- Date: 25 March 1887
- Winning horse: Gamecock
- Starting price: 20/1
- Jockey: Bill Daniels
- Trainer: James Gordon
- Owner: E Jay
- Conditions: Good

The 1887 Grand National was the 49th renewal of the renewal of the Grand National horse race that took place at Aintree Racecourse near Liverpool, England, on 25 March 1887.

== Finishing Order ==
Position	Name	Jockey	Handicap (st-lb)	SP	Distance
01	Gamecock	Bill Daniels	11-0	20-1	3 Lengths
02	Savoyard	Tom Skelton	10-13	100-14	A Distance
03	Johnny Longtail	Joe? Childs	10-6	40-1	
04	Chancellor	William Moore	10-12	20-1	
05	Chancery	Bill Dollery	11-6	100-1	
06	Too Good	Harry Beasley	12-0	100-7	
07	Magpie	William Woodland	10-10	10-1	
08	Frigate	FE Lawrence	11-5	100-9	
09	Old Joe	Charles Cunningham	11-10	100-8	
10	Sinbad	William Nightingale	10-3	22½-1	Last to complete

== Non-finishers ==
Fence	Name	Jockey	Handicap (st-lb)	SP	Fate
26	Roquefort	Ted Wilson	12-8	7-1	Fell
02	Bellona	George Lambton	10-10	100-9	Fell
25	Spectrum	R. Grimes	10-10	35-1	Fell
03	Spahi	Tommy Beasley	10-10	9-2	Fell
02	Ballot Box	Roddy Owen	10-5	33-1	Fell
15	Hunter	William Beasley	10-0	50-1	Fell
