= Penelope (horse) =

British Thoroughbred racehorse

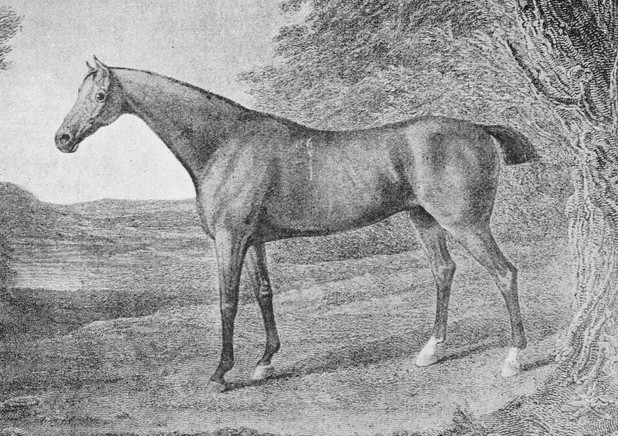
- Painting of Penelope
- Sire: Trumpator
- Grandsire: Conductor
- Dam: Prunella
- Damsire: Highflyer
- Sex: Mare
- Foaled: 1798
- Country: Great Britain
- Colour: Bay
- Breeder: 3rd Duke of Grafton
- Owner: 3rd Duke of Grafton; 4th Duke of Grafton
- Record: 25: 16-7-1

Major wins
- Sweepstakes of 100 gs at Newmarket (1801); Ipswich King's Purse (1801); October Oatlands Stakes (1801); One-third Subscription of 25 gs (1803); First Class of Oatlands Stakes (1804); Newmarket King's Plate for mares (1804) £50 Subscription at Newmarket (1804); Jockey-Club Plate (1804)

Honours
- Prix Penelope at Saint-Cloud Racecourse

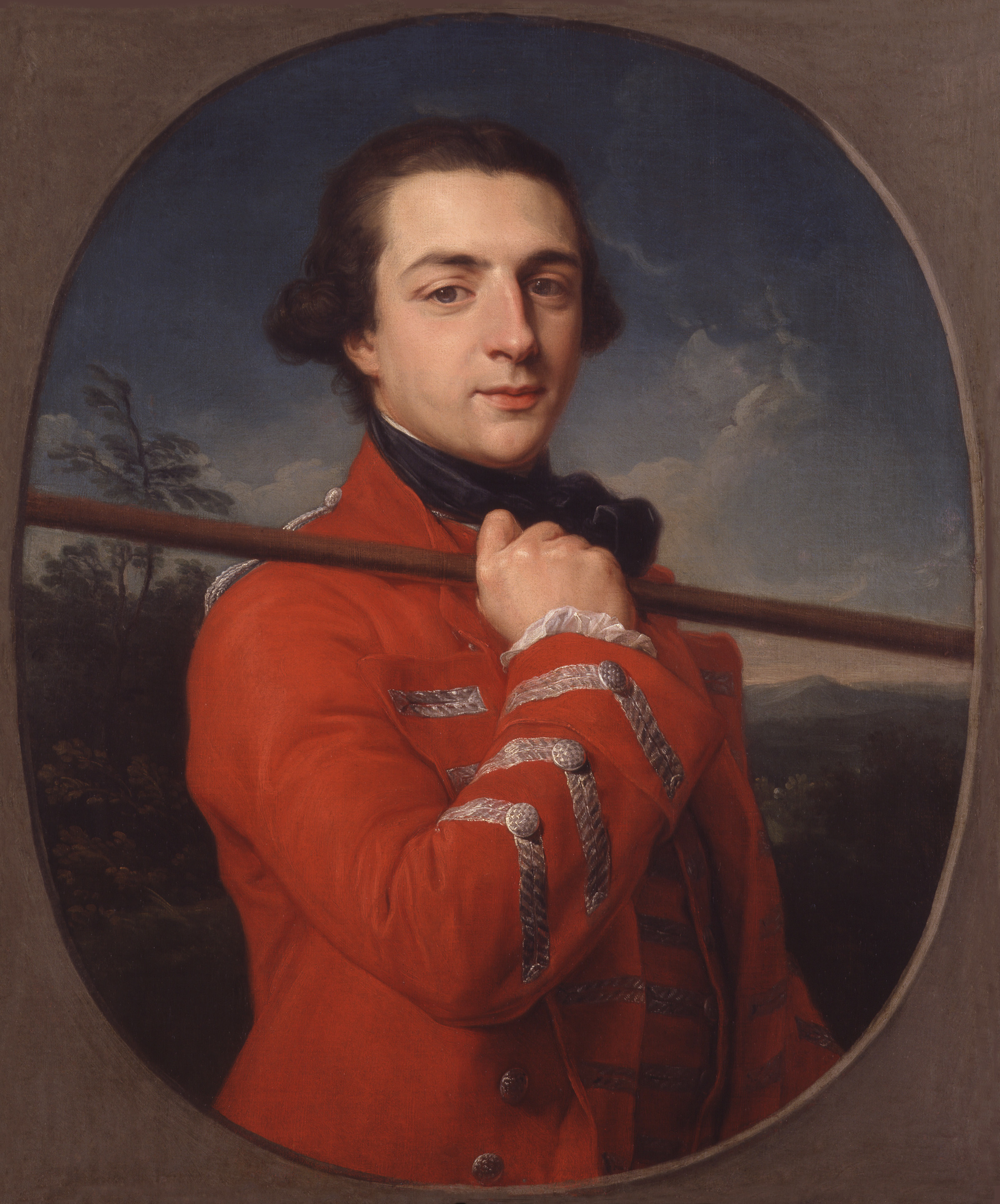
Penelope's owner, the 3rd Duke of Grafton

Penelope (1798–1824) was a British Thoroughbred racehorse. She won sixteen of her twenty-four races, including two Oatlands Stakes, the Jockey-Club Plate and she beat Oaks and Derby winner Eleanor. She was bred and owned by Augustus FitzRoy, 3rd Duke of Grafton. After retiring from racing she became an influential broodmare, foaling Derby winners Whalebone and Whisker and 1000 Guineas winner Whizgig.

== Background ==
Penelope was a bay filly bred by Augustus FitzRoy, 3rd Duke of Grafton, and foaled in 1798. She was sired by Claret Stakes winner Trumpator, who after retiring from racing became British Champion sire in 1803. Amongst his other progeny were Champion sire Sorcerer and Epsom Derby winner Didelot. Penelope's dam, Prunella, was a top broodmare and a daughter of the undefeated Highflyer. Prunella won three races, including a Sweepstakes of 200 guineas each at Newmarket. She also foaled Derby winner Pope and Oaks winner Pelisse. All of Prunella's daughters who lived to produce a foal became top broodmares in their own right. Her daughters Parasol, Pledge, Pawn, Pope Joan and Prudence all foaled Classic winners. Penelope was Prunella's second foal.

== Racing career ==
=== 1801: Three-year-old season ===
Penelope made her first racecourse appearance on 22 April 1801 at Newmarket, where she beat a Trumpator colt and a Buzzard colt in a Sweepstakes of 100 guineas each over one mile. She had started as the outsider of the three runner field at 5/2. At Newmarket's Second spring meeting in May she raced in a £50 race for three-year-olds over one mile. Eleven horses started the race, with Paulo starting as the favourite at 5/2 and Penelope and the brother to Spear next in the betting at 5/1. Peneolpe won the race from a brother to Spear, with Paulo finishing in third place. Racing away from Newmarket for the first time on 7 July, she won the King's Purse at Ipswich. She faced a Pot-8-Os filly and Thais in a race consisting of two-mile heats. Penelope won both heats, therefore winning the race.

Penelope returned to Newmarket later in the month and beat Thais and Ostrich in the Town Plate, a race run over a distance of just under one mile and two furlongs. Penelope had started the race as the odds-on favourite. She then won another Town Plate at Newmarket's First October meeting. In the two-mile race she beat five rivals after starting as the 1/3 favourite. Her final race of the season was the October Oatlands Stakes, a race run over one mile, also at Newmarket. She started the seven runner race as the 5/4 favourite and duly won. Beating Striver into second place, with Chippenham third and Vivaldi fourth.

=== 1802: Four-year-old season ===
Penelope was defeated for the first time in the first class of the Oatlands Stakes in April 1802. She started the race as the 3/1 favourite and finished in third place of the nine runners, behind winner Lignum Vitae and runner-up Wilkes. She was then due to face Informer in a match race, but Informer pulled out of the race, paying a 20 guineas forfeit. In May she won a Sweepstakes of 15 guineas each over one mile at Newmarket, beating Friday into second place. Penelope didn't race during the summer and returned to Newmarket in October for a Sweepstakes of 100 guineas each. Marianne won the race, with Penelope finishing second and Gaoler third. The following day she lost a race for one-third of a subscription of 25 guineas each to Epsom Derby winner Eleanor. Penelope finished the race in second, ahead of a sister to Gouty. In her last race of the season she finished fifth in the October Oatlands Stakes. The race was won by Rebel, from Eagle in second.

=== 1803: Five-year-old season ===
On her seasonal reappearance, Penelope beat Duxbury in a match race. Again racing at Newmarket, she finished second to Orange-flower in a Sweepstakes of 100 guineas each. In July she was the runner-up to Rumbo in a £50 race at Newmarket. In October she won a Subscription of 5 guineas each, beating Surprize, Lignum and two others. At the second October meeting she beat Eleanor and Malta to win a race for one-third of a subscription of 25 guineas each. Eleanor had started the four-mile, one and a half furlong race as the 4/6 favourite, with Penelope at 7/4. At the end of October she beat Viscount Sackville's Whirligig in a 100 guineas match race.

=== 1804: Six-year-old season ===
Penelope reappeared in April 1804 for the first class of the Oatlands Stakes. She started as the favourite of the six runners and won the race from Chippenham, who was followed by Brighton. Penelope was due to face Eagle later in the month at the first spring meeting, but Eagle paid a forfeit and withdrew from the race. At the meeting, she did, however, beat Eleanor in the King Plate for mares. The race was run over 3 miles and 6 1/2 furlongs, with Penelope favoured in the betting. The following day she faced St. Leger winner Quiz and Montalto in a £50 race run over the three-mile Dutton's course. Quiz started the race as the 11/10 favourite, with Penelope at 6/5. Penelope won the race from Quiz. In May, at Newmarket's second spring meeting she beat Dick Andrews in the Jockey-Club Plate. Penelope was the favourite for the four-mile, one and a half furlong race. On 1 October at Newmarket, she lost a match to Bobtail over a mile and a quarter. Later in the day she finished runner-up to Sir Harry Dimsdale in a subscription of 5 guineas each. Eleanor finished the race in third place, with Rumbo fourth. At the Houghton meeting she beat Bobtail in a four-mile, one and a half furlong match race.

=== 1805: Seven-year-old season ===
At the Newmarket Craven meeting in April 1805 Penelope lost a 200 guinea match race to Walton, who was carrying one pound less than Penelope. She was then retired to the Duke of Grafton's stud to become a broodmare.

== Stud career ==
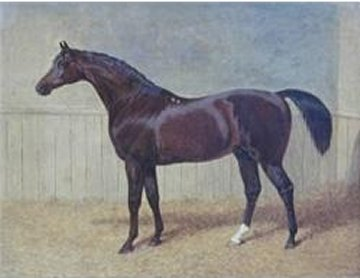
Penelope's son Whalebone

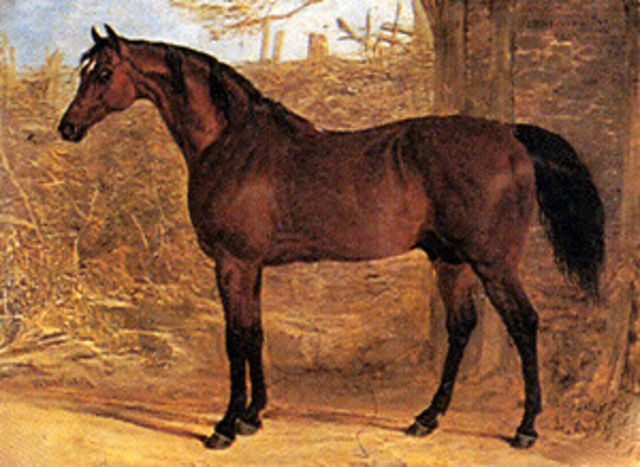
Penelope's son Whisker

As a broodmare, Penelope produced thirteen foals. They were:

- Waxy filly – a bay filly foaled in 1806 and sired by Waxy.
- Whalebone – a brown stallion foaled in 1807 and sired by Waxy. As a three-year-old he won the Newmarket Stakes and Epsom Derby in 1810. He was later Champion sire, with his progeny including Camel, Caroline, Lap-dog, Sir Hercules and Spaniel.
- Web – a bay mare foaled in 1808 and sired by Waxy. She foaled Riddlesworth Stakes winner Glenartney and Derby winner Middleton and Trampoline. Foundation mare of family 1-s
- Woful – a bay stallion foaled in 1809 and sired by Waxy. He won several races and sired the classic winning fillies Arab, Augusta and Zinc.
- Wilful – a chestnut filly foaled in 1810 and sired by Waxy. She was sent to Ireland.
- Wire – a brown filly foaled in 1811 and sired by Waxy. She was sent to Ireland.
- Whisker – a bay stallion foaled in 1812 and sired by Waxy. He won several races, including the 1815 Derby and the Port Stakes. Along with many good broodmares he sired St. Leger winners Memnon and The Colonel.
- 1813 Barren to Vandyke
- Waterloo – a bay colt foaled in 1814 and sired by Walton. He won the Newmarket St. Leger.
- 1815 Barren to Selim
- Wildfire – a bay colt foaled in 1816 and sired by Waxy. He was sent to Germany where he died in 1834.
- Windfall – a chestnut gelding foaled in 1817 and sired by Waxy.
- 1818 Barren to Waxy
- Whizgig – a chestnut mare foaled in 1819 and sired by Rubens. She won the 1000 Guineas in 1822 and was the dam of Oaks winner Oxygen.
- 1820 Barren to Rubens
- 1821 Barren to Scud
- Waltz – a chestnut filly foaled in 1822 and sired by Election.
- Wamba – a bay colt foaled in 1823 and sired by Merlin.
- 1824 Not Covered in 1823

Penelope's daughters were so influential that she was later named the foundation mare of family 1-o. Families 1-p, 1-r, 1-s, 1-t, 1-u, 1-w and 1-x all trace back to her. She died in early 1824.

== Pedigree ==
Pedigree of Penelope, bay mare, 1798
Sire Trumpator (GB) bl. 1782	Conductor (GB) ch. 1767	Matchem b. 1748	Cade
Sire Trumpator (GB) bl. 1782	Conductor (GB) ch. 1767	Matchem b. 1748	Partner mare
Sire Trumpator (GB) bl. 1782	Conductor (GB) ch. 1767	Snap mare 1762	Snap*
Sire Trumpator (GB) bl. 1782	Conductor (GB) ch. 1767	Snap mare 1762	Cullen Arabian mare
Sire Trumpator (GB) bl. 1782	Brunette (GB) br. 1771	Squirrel b. 1754	Traveller
Sire Trumpator (GB) bl. 1782	Brunette (GB) br. 1771	Squirrel b. 1754	Grey Bloody Buttocks
Sire Trumpator (GB) bl. 1782	Brunette (GB) br. 1771	Dove; 1764	Matchless
Sire Trumpator (GB) bl. 1782	Brunette (GB) br. 1771	Dove; 1764	Ancaster Starling mare
Dam Prunella (GB) b. 1788	Highflyer (GB) b. 1774	Herod b. 1758	Tartar
Dam Prunella (GB) b. 1788	Highflyer (GB) b. 1774	Herod b. 1758	Cypron
Dam Prunella (GB) b. 1788	Highflyer (GB) b. 1774	Rachel; 1763	Blank*
Dam Prunella (GB) b. 1788	Highflyer (GB) b. 1774	Rachel; 1763	Regulus mare
Dam Prunella (GB) b. 1788	Promise (GB) br. 1768	Snap* br. 1750	Snip*
Dam Prunella (GB) b. 1788	Promise (GB) br. 1768	Snap* br. 1750	Fox mare*
Dam Prunella (GB) b. 1788	Promise (GB) br. 1768	Julia b. 1756	Blank*
Dam Prunella (GB) b. 1788	Promise (GB) br. 1768	Julia b. 1756	Partner mare

Note: b. = Bay, bl. = Black, br. = Brown, ch. = Chestnut

* Penelope is inbred 4S x 3D to the stallion Snap, meaning that he appears fourth generation on the sire side of her pedigree, and third generation on the dam side of her pedigree.

* Penelope is inbred 4D x 4D to the stallion Blank, meaning that he appears fourth generation twice on the dam side of her pedigree.
