= 1809 in sports =

1809 in sports describes the year's events in world sport.

== Boxing ==
Events

- 1 February — English champion Tom Cribb retains his title by defeating Jem Belcher in 31 rounds at Epsom Downs
- 30 April — death of former English champion Hen Pearce, who had retired in 1807 because of his failing health

== Cricket ==
Events

- It is about this time that the no-ball rule is first applied re the bowler's foot being over the crease. It would be applied to throwing in 1816.
- Lord's Old Ground, home of Marylebone Cricket Club (MCC), has become the accepted venue for all great matches and it is the ambition of every aspiring cricketer to play there. But Lord's is already losing its rural character as London expands and begins to surround it. The landlord, Mr Portman, feels able to increase the rent and so Thomas Lord decides to seek another venue. The lease on the "Old Ground" is due to expire on Lady Day in 1810 but Lord moves fast and, by May 1809, has secured a lease on another plot of land, part of the St John's Wood estate which belongs to the Eyre family. He opens this "Middle Ground" in time for the 1809 season but MCC at first refuses to relocate and continues at the Old Ground until the winter of 1810-11 when Lord stages a fait accompli by literally seizing "his turf" which is dug up and moved to the Middle Ground.
- John Sherman makes his debut in first-class cricket. His career continues to 1852 and is the joint-longest on record, equalled only by W. G. Grace.

England

- Most runs – Lord Frederick Beauclerk 464 (HS 114)
- Most wickets – Thomas Howard 35

== Horse racing ==
Events

- Inaugural running of the 2,000 Guineas Stakes at Newmarket

England

- 2,000 Guineas Stakes – Wizard
- The Derby – Pope
- The Oaks – Maid of Orleans
- St Leger Stakes – Ashton
