= 1813 in sports =

1813 in sports describes the year's events in world sport.

== Boxing ==
Events

- Tom Cribb retains his English championship but no fights involving him are recorded in 1813.

== Cricket ==
Events

- With the Napoleonic War at its height, cricket continues to be badly impacted by the consequent loss of both manpower and investment. First-class matches have become few and far between since 1810 and only one is recorded in 1813.
- The Nottingham Review comments: "The manly and athletic game at cricket for which the boys of Sherwood have been so long and so justly famed, it was thought, had fallen into disuse, if not disgrace...." The reference to "disgrace" is interesting for there is a view expressed by Rowland Bowen that the game has gone out of fashion in addition to the wartime problems it faces.
- The site of Lord's Middle Ground is requisitioned by Parliament for the building of the Regent's Canal. Thomas Lord contacts the Eyre family, erstwhile owners of the ground, and persuades them to lease to him another parcel of land in St John's Wood, about half a mile further north at a place called North Bank. This site has previously been a duckpond. In the winter of 1813-14, Lord again has his turf literally dug up and removed.

England

- Most runs – Robert Robinson 78 (HS 78)
- Most wickets – E. H. Budd and William Lambert 5 apiece

== Horse racing ==
England

- 2,000 Guineas Stakes – Smolensko
- The Derby – Smolensko
- The Oaks – Music
- St. Leger Stakes – Altisidora
