= 1809 Epsom Derby =

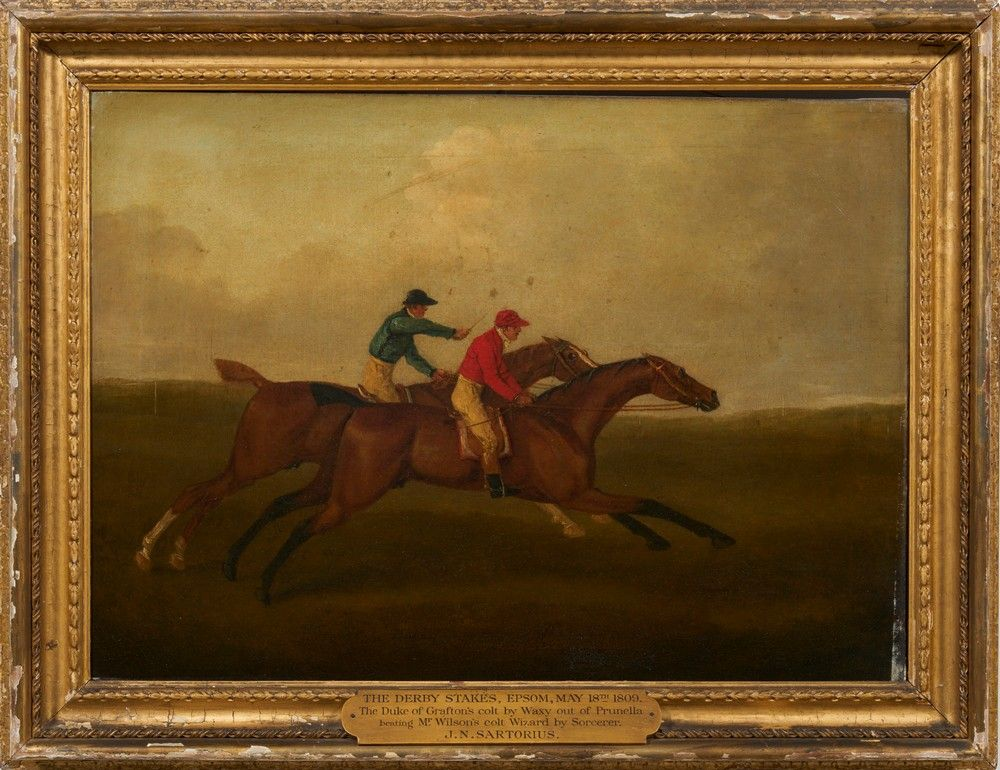
Pope (foreground) beating Wizard by a neck in the race. (John Nost Sartorius)

The 1809 Epsom Derby was a horse race which took place at Epsom Downs on 18 May 1809. It was the 29th running of the Derby, and it was won by Pope. The winner was ridden by Tom Goodisson and trained by Robert Robson.

== Race details ==
- Number of runners: 10

== Full result ==
	*	Horse	Jockey	Trainer	SP
1		Pope	Tom Goodisson	Robert Robson	20/1
2	neck	Wizard	W. Clift	Tom Perren	4/5
3		Salvator	S. Barnard		9/1
4		Fair Star	W. Wilkinson		6/1
5		Trusty	B. Arnold		100/4
6		Osprey			15/1
0		Colt by Gohanna			100/4
0		Cock Robin			10/1
0		Botleys
0		Blue Ruin			100/4

Note: Finishing position of 0 here indicates also ran, but finished lower than 6th

* The distances between the horses are shown in lengths or shorter. shd = short-head; hd = head; PU = pulled up.

== Winner's details ==
Further details of the winner, Pope:

- Foaled: 1806
- Sire: Waxy; Dam: Prunella (by Highflyer)
- Owner: 3rd Duke of Grafton
- Breeder: 3rd Duke of Grafton
