= 1815 in sports =

1815 in sports describes the year's events in world sport.

== Boxing ==
Events

- Tom Cribb retains his English championship but no fights involving him are recorded in 1815.

== Cricket ==
Events

- The earliest known first-class centuries at the new Lord's Cricket Ground are scored in the Middlesex v Epsom match on 24 & 25 August by Felix Ladbroke and Frederick Woodbridge who score 116 and 107 respectively for Epsom.

England

- Most runs – William Lambert 172 (HS 50)
- Most wickets – Henry Bentley 15 (BB 4–?)

== Horse racing ==
England

- 1,000 Guineas Stakes – filly by Selim
- 2,000 Guineas Stakes – Tigris
- The Derby – Whisker
- The Oaks – Minuet
- St. Leger Stakes – Filho da Puta
