= Tom Goodisson =

British jockey

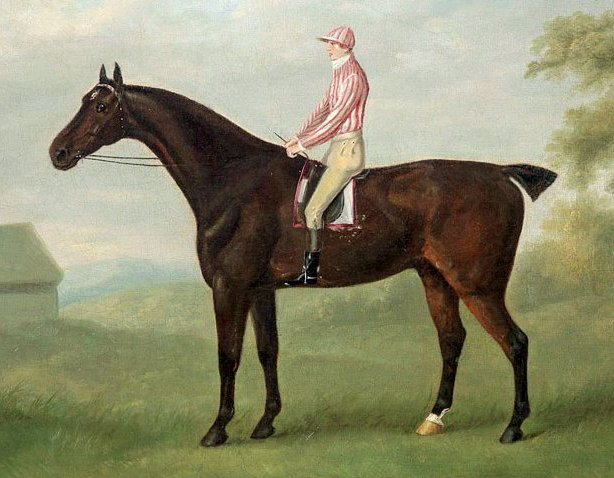
- Tom Goodisson on Smolensko c.1813, by John Nott Sartorius

Personal information
- Born: 1782
- Died: 1840 (aged 57–58) Newmarket, Suffolk
- Occupation: Jockey

Horse racing career
- Sport: Horse racing

Major racing wins
- British Classic Race wins as jockey: Epsom Oaks (1813, 1815); Epsom Derby (1809, 1813, 1815, 1822); St Leger Stakes (1823)

Significant horses
- Barefoot, Minuet, Moses, Music, Pope, Smolensko, Whisker

Thomas Goodisson (1782–1840) was a four times Epsom Derby winning British jockey. He was the son of Dick Goodisson, the jockey who won the first three runnings of The Oaks.

Goodisson was only 12 years old when he had his first race ride, on the Duke of Bedford-owned Cub at Newmarket. At that age, he was an incredibly lightweight jockey. In 1795, he weighed only 4 stone 1 pound when he won a famous 500 guineas match race between the Duke of Queensberry's horse, Pecker, and Benington on the Beacon Course at Newmarket.

On 18 May 1809, Goodisson lined up in the Derby on board Pope against nine other horses. From the start, the Duke of Rutland's colt Salvator took the lead and was the frontrunner until Tattenham Corner when Mr. Wilson's chestnut colt Wizard took the lead. Wizard held his position until "within a few strides of the winning-post" when Goodisson "made one serve for all" and took the win from Wizard by a neck. It was said afterwards that Goodisson "rode his horse with great skill and judgement" and "gave great satisfaction to all present."

A few years later, in 1813, he won his first Oaks riding a filly called Music. That same year he went on to complete the Derby/Oaks double, winning the Derby on the black colt, Smolensko, one of only two black horses to have won the Derby. As payment for winning the Derby, the horse's owner, Sir Charles Bunbury gave Goodisson a ten-pound note. He insisted that he would have given the jockey more had his bookmaker, a man called Brograve, cut his own throat rather than paying out his losses.

Goodison would go on to repeat the Oaks/Derby double in 1815 for another of his retainers, the Duke of Grafton, on Minuet and Whisker respectively. Besides Bunbury and Grafton, his principle patron was the Duke of York for whom he won the 1822 Derby on Moses. He won more big races for the Duke of York than almost any other jockey.

After retiring, Goodisson became a breeder of horses. He died at Newmarket in 1840.

== Classic race victories ==
(United Kingdom) Great Britain

- Epsom Oaks – Music (1813), Minuet (1815)
- Epsom Derby – Pope (1809), Smolensko (1813), Whisker (1815), Moses (1822)
- St. Leger – Barefoot (1823)

== See also ==
- List of jockeys
- List of significant families in British horse racing

== Bibliography ==
- Mortimer, Roger; Onslow, Richard; Willett, Peter (1978). Biographical Encyclopaedia of British Racing. London: Macdonald and Jane's. ISBN 0354085360.
- Wright, Howard (1986). The Encyclopaedia of Flat Racing. London: Robert Hale. ISBN 0-7090-2639-0.
