= Waxy (horse) =

British Thoroughbred racehorse (1790–1818)

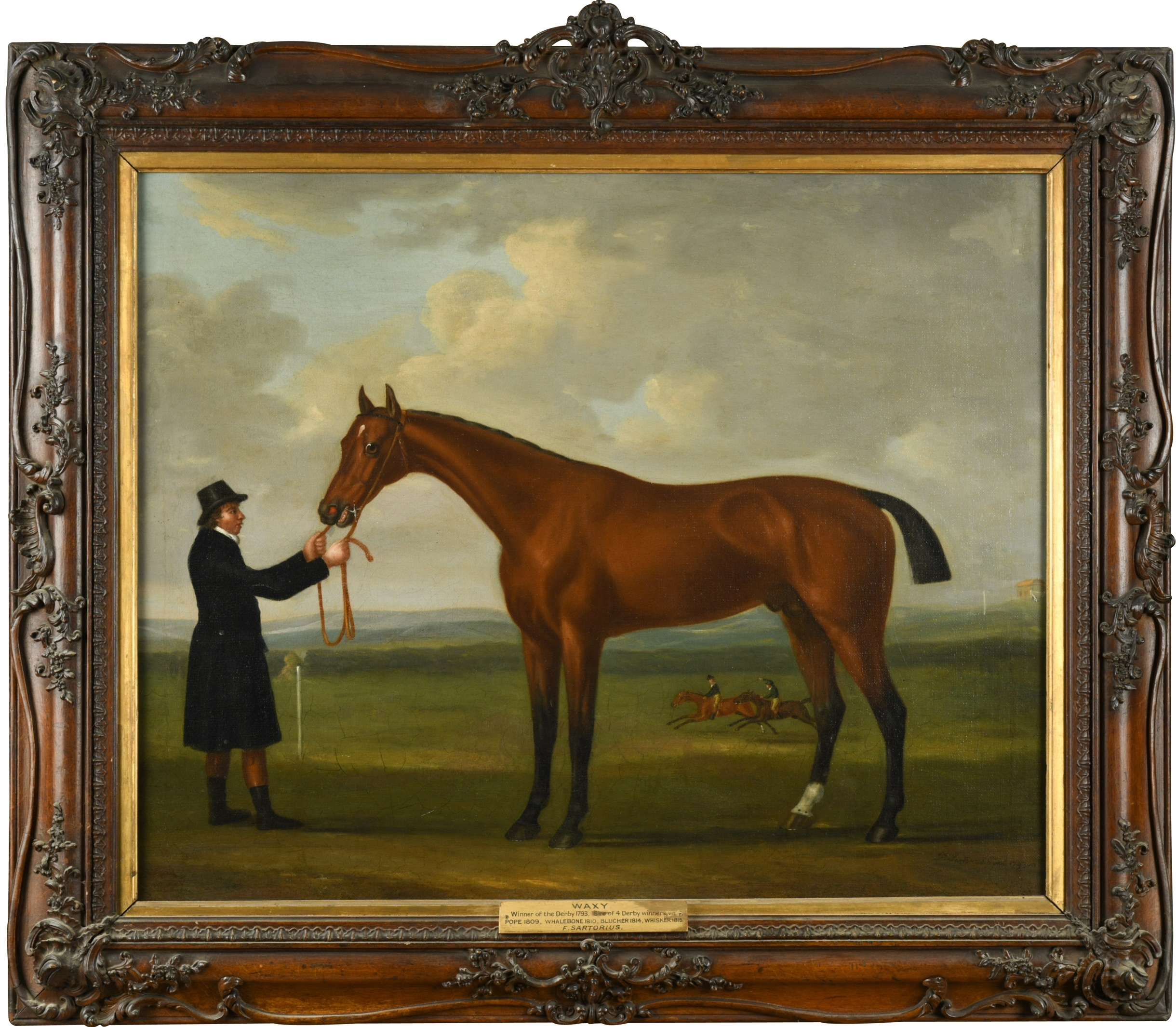
- Waxy, winner of the 1793 Derby by Francis Sartorius.
- Sire: Potoooooooo
- Grandsire: Eclipse
- Dam: Maria
- Damsire: Herod
- Sex: Stallion
- Foaled: 1790
- Died: 18 April 1818; Euston Hall; Euston, Suffolk, England
- Country: Kingdom of Great Britain
- Colour: Bay
- Breeder: Sir Ferdinando Poole
- Owner: 1) Sir Ferdinando Poole (1790–1804); 2) 3rd Duke of Grafton (1804–1811); 3) 4th Duke of Grafton (1811–1818)
- Trainer: Robert Robson
- Record: 15: 9-3-2

Major wins
- Epsom Derby (1793)

Honours
- Leading sire in Great Britain and Ireland (1810)

Waxy (1790 – 18 April 1818) was a British Thoroughbred racehorse which won the 1793 Epsom Derby and was an influential sire in the late eighteenth and early part of the nineteenth century. Waxy was bred by Sir Ferdinando Poole and was foaled at Lewes in 1790. He was sired by Pot-8-Os, a son of the foundation stallion Eclipse, whose genetic lineage traced to the Darley Arabian. Waxy's dam, Maria, was sired by the influential stallion Herod and produced one full-brother to Waxy, who was named Worthy. Waxy derived his name from a variety of potato, a choice that was inspired by his sire's name. Trained by Robert Robson, Waxy won nine races out of 15 starts during his four-year racing career, retiring from racing at the age of seven in 1797 after sustaining an injury during his last start.

Beginning in 1798, Waxy stood at stud at Sir Poole's estate in Lewes and remained there until Poole's death in 1804. After Poole's death, Waxy was acquired by the 3rd Duke of Grafton and stood at his Euston Hall stud. Waxy remained at Euston Hall for the remainder of his life and was used as a breeding stallion until his death on 18 April 1818. His most notable offspring were produced under the ownership of the 3rd Duke of Grafton and his son. Waxy produced 190 winners of races during his stud career, siring four Epsom Derby and three Epsom Oaks winners, becoming a leading sire in 1810. His most notable sons that achieved success in the stud were Whalebone and Whisker. Through the produce of these two sons, Waxy became the paternal ancestor of most of the world's male Thoroughbreds by the mid-twentieth century.

== Background ==
Waxy was bred by Sir Ferdinando Poole, a baronet whose family seat was in Poole, Cheshire. Sir Ferdinando leased an extensive estate in Lewes that was built on land once owned by the Grey Friars and was called "The Friary." Waxy was foaled in 1790 at Poole's stable at The Friary.

The colt was named "Waxy" to distinguish him from Poole's other colt sired by Pot-8-Os out of the mare Macaria, which was subsequently named "Mealy." Waxy and mealy were two types of potatoes available at the time and are a play on the name of the colts' sire Pot-8-Os, which is itself a pun on the name "Potatoes." A variant spelling, "Waxey," is mentioned in some publications.

=== Ancestry ===
Waxy's sire, Pot-8-Os, was a successful sire of racehorses that had won 34 races during his seven-year racing career. In addition to Waxy, Pot-8-Os produced the mare Parasol (the dam of Partisan) and the colt Lottery. Waxy was Pot-8-Os most successful son in the breeding shed, with Waxy's sons carrying on the direct-male line well into the 20th century.

Waxy's dam, Maria, was bred by Lord Bolingbroke and was sired by the Thoroughbred foundation sire Herod. She produced ten foals between 1784 and 1797, with Waxy being her sixth foal and one of two by Pot-8-Os. Waxy's full-brother, Worthy (foaled in 1795), was a moderately successful racer and was later a breeding stallion for the East India Company. Maria died in 1797, about two weeks after foaling the filly Wowski, later the dam of Derby winner Smolensko, Sir Charles and Thunderbolt.

=== Description ===
In the words of jockey Sam Chifney, Waxy was a "handsome, rich bay, with a white stocking on the off-hind [right] leg, good length, and especially beautiful quarters." In the words of his exercise rider (who wrote an anonymous letter to The Sporting Magazine in 1828), Waxy was "one of the finest formed horses, perfect in symmetry, beautiful in colour, admirable in all his paces, and of the finest temper when in work." However, when Waxy was confined to a stall during the winter months, his temperament became unruly and unpredictable leading the anonymous writer to remark that, "Oft has he kicked the lappets of my coat over my head." One of the few, possibly only, surviving portraits of Waxy was painted by Francis Sartorius in 1794 or 1795, and the depiction was praised in commentary for Sporting Magazine for its "neatness" and for "the truth of representation it so evidently display[ed]." While most breeding stallions and racehorses of the era had stable companions, Waxy reportedly was fond of rabbits in his later years and "was never happy without a rabbit in his paddock" with one female rabbit making her nest in the middle of his stall and raising generations of rabbits at the site that were never harmed by Waxy.

== Racing career ==
Waxy did not race at the age of two years, and his first turf appearance was at the spring meeting at Newmarket. Waxy was trained by Robert Robson, who worked for Sir Ferdinando Poole in Lewes for several years from about 1792. Waxy's main and most celebrated racing rival was Lord Egremont's colt Gohanna (first described as "Brother to Precipitate") who was called the "Pride of Petworth." Waxy raced Gohanna five times in his career, beating him in all but one race, a match race at Newmarket in 1794 where Waxy carried two more pounds than Gohanna and lost by half a head. Waxy was perceived as an excellent racehorse during his racing career. So much so that in one alleged incident, Waxy was mistakenly seized as a heriot after the proprietor of a Godstone inn where he was staying suddenly died. Being the finest horse in the stable, and assuming he was owned by the stablemaster he was briefly taken by the landowner. Waxy raced until he was seven years old and retired from racing after he was injured in his last start. He was then used as a breeding stallion by Poole at Lewes.

=== 1793: three-year-old season ===
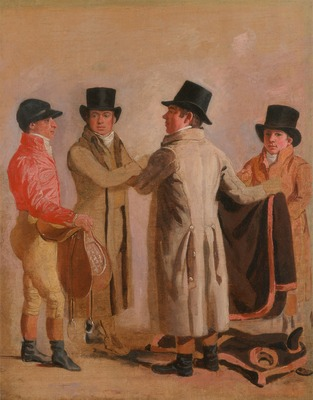
Waxy's trainer, Robert Robson (center) with jockey Frank Buckle (left) and John Wastel in a painting by Benjamin Marshall, c. 1802

The Epsom Derby occurred on 18 May and was attended by "as numerous a company as ever appeared on the course." Eleven horses lined up for the start, seven of them sired by Pot-8-Os. The starting odds for Waxy to win the Derby were 100 to 7 and 100 to 10 (depending on the bookmaking operation) and at the Tattersalls betting room he "was so little thought of, that he had never been mentioned" in the betting. The race favorite was Lord Egremont's colt "Brother to Precipitate" (later named Gohanna in 1795) with this horse taking the lead in the initial strides of the race. Waxy pushed Brother to Precipitate (a "bump" in modern racing terms) at the track's first turn, taking and maintaining the lead to become an "easy winner" of the Derby. Three of the top four finishers were sired by Pot-8-Os, with second-place finisher Brother to Precipitate being the exception. The meeting was also notable for a "dreadful accident," a collision between a servant on horseback with the colt Exiseman, the winner of the race after the Derby, and for the antics of John Lade dressed in a "loose undress of blue and white striped trowsers" asking the crowd to determine whether he was "the captain of a privateer or an ambassador from the Great Mogul."

At Lewes on 1 August, Waxy won an 80-guinea sweepstakes race against Lord Egremont's colt Mercury while carrying seven pounds more than the other horses in the race as a handicap for his win in the Derby. At Abingdon on 11 September, Waxy won a two-mile 40-guinea sweepstakes race against the colt Rockingham.

=== 1794: four-year-old season ===
Waxy won the Jockey Club Plate at the Second Spring meeting at Newmarket in May. At the same meeting a few days later, Waxy was beaten by Lord Egremont's colt Brother to Precipitate in a match race. On At Ipswich on 1 July, Waxy won a match race against Charles Bunbury's colt Robin Gray. At Lewes in July, Waxy ran against his previous rival, Brother to Precipitate, and won both heats in the four-mile Duke of Richmond's Plate for horses bred in Suffolk. On the same day, Waxy was the only horse that presented for the 60-guinea Ladies' Plate and won by default (termed as a "walk over").

=== 1795: five-year-old season ===
At Oxford on 18 August, Waxy was second in a 100-guinea cup race to Mr. Durand's filly Hermione. At Lewes on 6 August, Waxy was third in the four-mile Ladies' Plate to the colt Guildford and Lord Egremont's horse Gohanna. On 19 September at Salisbury, Waxy won two heats to win the 100-guinea His Majesty's Plate against the five-year-old horse Guatimozin.

=== 1796: six-year-old season ===
At the First Spring meeting, Waxy was second in the 100-guinea King's Plate to the colt Gabriel. In March at Newmarket, Waxy was third in the first class of the Oatland Stakes to the colts Viret and Pecker. In May, Waxy won His Majesty's Plate at Guildford against Gohanna and Guildford. On 31 August at Salisbury, Waxy won two four-mile heats against Gohanna for the 100-guinea His Majesty's Plate.

=== 1797: seven-year-old season ===
On 18 July at Oxford in the running for the Gold Cup, Waxy did not place and was noted to have "broke down" during the running. This was his last appearance on the turf and he was retired to stud the following season in 1798.

== Stud career ==
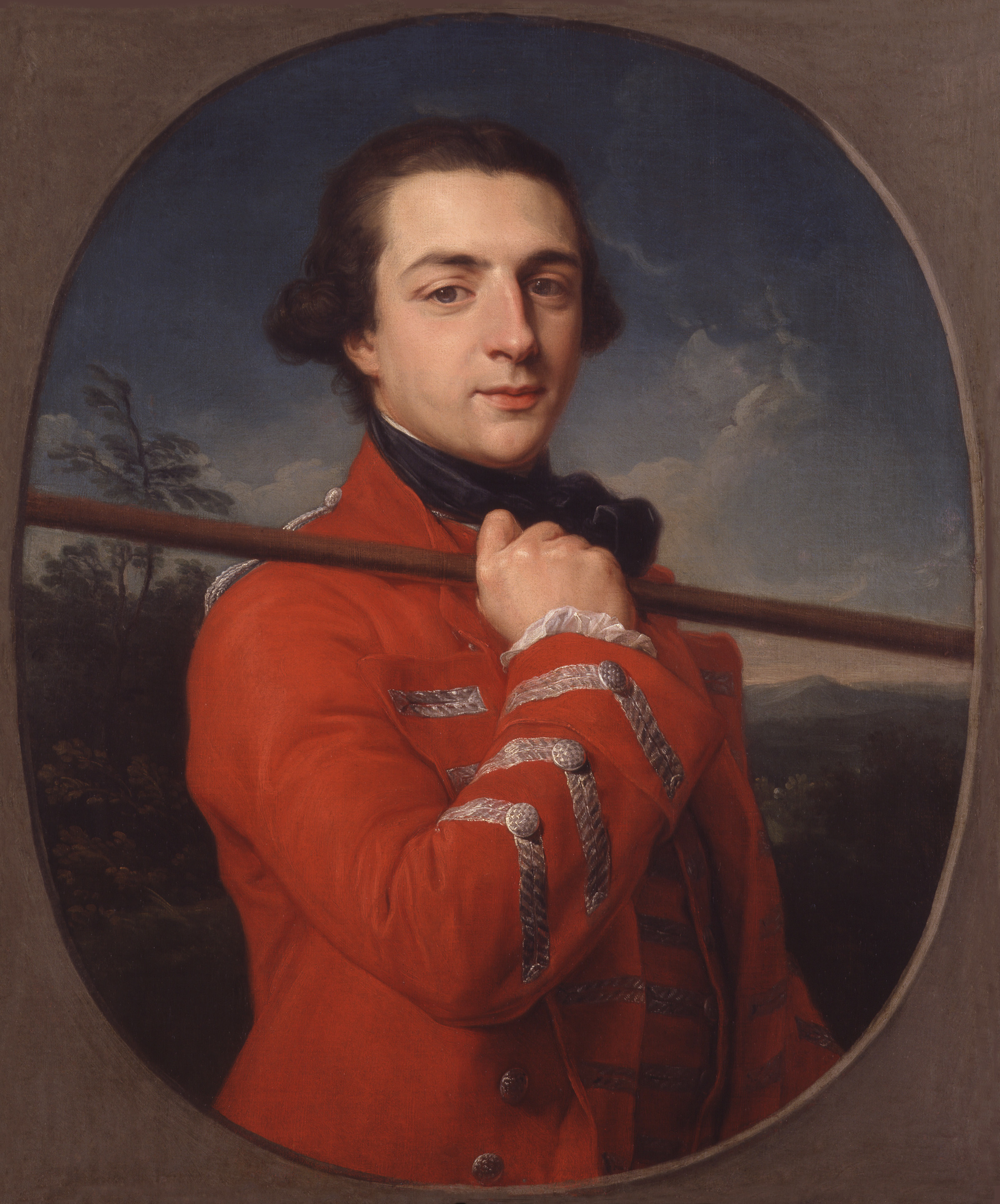
Waxy's most celebrated offspring were bred by the Duke of Grafton at the Euston Hall stud.

Waxy first stood at Lewes for a fee of 10 guineas per mare and a groom fee of 10 shillings. In September 1803, Sir Ferdinando Poole offered to sell Waxy for 700 guineas to William Lightfoot, an agent sent to buy horses for Virginian turfman John Tayloe. Lightfoot refused to buy Waxy, writing to Tayloe, "he has lost an eye, and is thirteen years old, and I think his health bad." Instead Lightfoot purchased Waxy's half-sister Keren Happuch who was covered by Waxy that year. It is unclear how Waxy lost his eye, its loss occurring sometime between 1797 and 1803. Sir Ferdinando Poole died on 8 June 1804, and Waxy was then acquired by the Duke of Grafton and relocated to the Euston Hall stud near Newmarket. Under the Duke's ownership, his fee increased to 25 guineas per mare and he covered 40 mares per season.

Waxy died on 18 April 1818 at the advanced age (for a Thoroughbred) of 28, having gone completely blind a few years before his death. He was buried at Newmarket, close to All Saints Church.

=== Legacy ===
Waxy produced 190 winners in his stud career, including four winners of the Epsom Derby and three winners of The Oaks. His first Derby winner, Waxy Pope, was foaled when Waxy was 16 years old and most of his notable offspring were produced in the last nine years of his life under the ownership of the Duke of Grafton and his son. Waxy was the leading sire in 1810, mostly due to the racing success of Pope and Whalebone. His importance to Thoroughbred genetics and prevalence in the General Stud Book led him to be likened to "the ace of trumps," the most powerful card in bridge, due in part to the success of his sons Whisker and Whalebone. In the mid-20th century, the paternal line of most of the world's male Thoroughbreds traced to the Darley Arabian through Waxy, and Waxy's line was one of only three male lines tracing to Eclipse that persisted into the 20th century (the others tracing through Hambletonian and Joe Andrews). In the words of 20th-century Thoroughbred pedigree analyst John Furman Wall, "with his advent, superb quality was a reality."

=== Notable offspring ===
Waxy produced four Epsom Derby winners: Waxy Pope (1809), Whalebone (1810), Blucher (1814) and Whisker (1815). He also sired three fillies that won The Oaks: Music (1813), Minuet (1815) and Corinne (1818). Corinne also won the 1,000 Guineas Stakes in 1818. His most productive offspring were produced by the mare Penelope (by Trumpator) and include Whalebone, Whisker, Web, Woful, Wire and Wilful. Penelope was bred and owned by the Duke of Grafton, and all of her foals were foaled at Euston Hall. Whisker was more notable for siring broodmares, and Whalebone was a good producer of colts. Waxy Pope was a leading sire in Ireland and Blucher was a marginally successful sire.

Foaled	Name	Sex	Major Wins/Achievements
1806	Pope	Stallion	Epsom Derby (1809), Leading sire in Great Britain and Ireland
1807	Whalebone	Stallion	Epsom Derby (1810)
1808	Web	Mare	Granddam of Glencoe I
1809	Woful	Stallion	Successful sire. Won 12 races.
1810	Music	Mare	Epsom Oaks (1813).
1811	Blucher	Stallion	Epsom Derby (1814). Successful sire.
1812	Minuet	Mare	Full sister to Music. Epsom Oaks (1815)
1812	Whisker	Stallion	Epsom Derby (1815). Sired Economist (grandsire of King Tom) and the filly Poetess (dam of Monarque)
1815	Corinne	Mare	Epsom Oaks (1818), 1000 Guineas Stakes (1818). Was an unsuccessful broodmare.

== Sire line tree ==
- Waxy
  - Shock
  - Pavilion
  - Sir Walter Raleigh
  - Sasenagh
  - Ipswich
  - Waxy Pope
    - The Dandy
    - Prendergast
    - Starch
      - Zimmerman
    - Canteen
    - Sligo
    - Trumpeter
    - Mount Eagle
    - Skylark
    - The Cardinal
  - Crispin
  - Woful
    - Theodore
    - Wanton
  - Blucher
  - Quinola
  - Whisker
    - Abron
    - Caccia Patti
    - Mustachio
    - Swiss
    - Catterick
      - Jerry
    - Memnon
      - King Cole
      - Czudo
      - Sygnal
    - Coulon
    - Economist
      - The General
      - Normanby
      - Harkaway
        - The Connaught Ranger
        - Finvaragh
        - Ballinafad
        - Cappard
        - Earth Stopper
        - Harkover
        - Horn Of Chase
        - Lanesborough
        - Peep O'Day Boy
        - Tally Ho
        - The Heath
        - Blucher
        - Idle Boy
        - Sobraon
        - Elcho
        - Irelands Eye
        - The Hunting Horn
        - King Tom
        - Wild Huntsman
        - Cheerful Horn
      - Economy
      - Doctor Sangado
      - Mulligatawney
      - Condor
      - Lord George
      - Flying Buck
    - The Colonel
      - D'Egville
      - Cap-a-Pie
        - Sir Hercules
      - Chatham
        - Sittingborne
        - Student
    - Emancipation
    - Lawrie Todd
    - Perion
    - Whisker
      - Jorrocks
  - Milton
  - Inferior
  - Anti-Gallican
  - Whalebone
    - Waverley
      - The Saddler
        - The Provost
        - Miles Boy
        - Sylvan
      - Locomotive
      - The Bard
      - Don John
        - Iago
        - The Ban
    - Moses
    - Peter Fin
    - Longwaist
      - Vestment
      - Doncaster
    - Camel
      - Abbas Mirza
        - The Shah
      - Touchstone
        - Auckland
        - Cotherstone
        - Ithuriel
        - Orlando
        - Annandale
        - Paragone
        - Poynton
        - William Tell
        - Flatcatcher
        - Surplice
        - Nunnykirk
        - The Italian
        - Mountain Deer
        - Newminster
        - Young Touchstone
        - Vindex
        - Claret
        - Lord Of The Isles
        - Artillary
        - Lord Of The Hills
        - Tournament
        - Wamba
      - Caravan
        - Souvenir
      - Wintonian
      - Launcelot
      - Fiammetta
      - Simoom
        - Barbarian
      - Misdeal
    - Chateau Margaux
    - Flexible
    - Stumps
      - Viator
    - Lap-Dog
    - Defence
      - Tipple Cider
      - Bulwark
      - Barrier
      - Palladium
      - The Emperor
        - Allez Y Gaiement
        - Baroncino
        - Lindor
        - Monarque
    - Merman
    - Sir Hercules
      - Arthur
      - Birdcatcher
        - Ballinkeele
        - Mickey Free
        - King Fisher
        - The Baron
        - Bryan O'Linn
        - Caurouch
        - Chanticleer
        - Royal O'More
        - Marquis
        - Augur
        - Daniel O'Rourke
        - Womersley
        - Lord Fauconberg
        - Bandy
        - Gamekeeper
        - Grey Plover
        - Knight Of St George
        - Papageno
        - Warlock
        - Saunterer
        - Red Eagle
        - Oxford
      - The Hydra
        - Chief Justice
        - Mark Tapely
      - Hyllus
      - The Corsair
      - Coronation
      - Robert de Gorham
        - Sir Colin
      - Newcourt
        - Cotswold
      - Faugh-a-Ballagh
        - Goldfinder
        - Le Juif
        - Ethelwolf
        - Father Thames
        - Lucio
        - Morning Star
        - Ethelbert
        - Barrel
        - Fearless
        - Knight Of The Garter
        - Leamington
        - The Brewer
        - Master Bagot
        - The Hadji
        - Ben Brace
        - Blackthorn
        - Knight Of The Blaze
        - Garibaldi
        - Pretendant
        - L'Africain
        - Armagnac
        - Jarnicoton
      - Discount
      - Hagley
      - Hartneitstein
      - Hotspur
      - Landgrave
      - Knight Of The Shire
      - Gemma di Vergy
        - Lucifer
        - Rococo
      - Gunboat
        - Torpedo
      - Lifeboat
        - The Mariner
      - Sir Hercules
    - The Exquisite
    - Cetus
    - Spaniel
    - Vestris
      - Mathew
    - The Sea
      - Freetrader

== Pedigree ==
Pedigree of Waxy (GB), Bay colt, 1790
Sire Potoooooooo (GB) chestnut 1773	Eclipse; 1764	Marske	Squirt
Sire Potoooooooo (GB) chestnut 1773	Eclipse; 1764	Marske	The Ruby Mare
Sire Potoooooooo (GB) chestnut 1773	Eclipse; 1764	Spilletta	Regulus*
Sire Potoooooooo (GB) chestnut 1773	Eclipse; 1764	Spilletta	Mother Western
Sire Potoooooooo (GB) chestnut 1773	Sportsmistress; 1795	Sportsman	Cade*
Sire Potoooooooo (GB) chestnut 1773	Sportsmistress; 1795	Sportsman	Silvertail
Sire Potoooooooo (GB) chestnut 1773	Sportsmistress; 1795	Golden Locks	Oroonoko
Sire Potoooooooo (GB) chestnut 1773	Sportsmistress; 1795	Golden Locks	Crab mare
Dam Maria (GB) bay 1777	Herod; 1758	Tartar	Partner
Dam Maria (GB) bay 1777	Herod; 1758	Tartar	Meliora
Dam Maria (GB) bay 1777	Herod; 1758	Cypron	Blaze
Dam Maria (GB) bay 1777	Herod; 1758	Cypron	Salome
Dam Maria (GB) bay 1777	Lisette; 1772	Snap	Snip
Dam Maria (GB) bay 1777	Lisette; 1772	Snap	Sister to Slipby
Dam Maria (GB) bay 1777	Lisette; 1772	Miss Windsor	Godolphin Arabian*
Dam Maria (GB) bay 1777	Lisette; 1772	Miss Windsor	Sister One to Volunteer (Family 18)

* Waxy is inbred 5S x 5S x 4D to the stallion Godolphin Arabian, meaning that he appears fifth generation twice (via Regulus and Cade) on the sire side of his pedigree, and fourth generation once on the dam side of his pedigree.
