= Music (horse) =

British-bred Thoroughbred racehorse

- Sire: Waxy
- Grandsire: Potoooooooo
- Dam: Woodbine
- Damsire: Woodpecker
- Sex: Mare
- Foaled: 1810
- Country: United Kingdom of Great Britain and Ireland
- Colour: Bay
- Breeder: Augustus FitzRoy, 3rd Duke of Grafton
- Owner: George FitzRoy, 4th Duke of Grafton
- Trainer: Robert Robson
- Record: 7:1-1-1

Major wins
- Oaks Stakes (1813)

Music (foaled 1810) was a British Thoroughbred racehorse and broodmare who won the classic Oaks Stakes at Epsom Downs Racecourse in 1813. Music's success in the Guineas was the only win in a seven race career and gave her owner George FitzRoy, 4th Duke of Grafton the first of twenty classic wins. Music was sold and exported to Ireland at the end of her three-year-old season.

== Background ==
Music was a bay mare bred by Augustus FitzRoy, 3rd Duke of Grafton at his stud at Euston Hall in Suffolk. On the third Duke's death in 1811 ownership of the stud and the yearling filly passed to his son George FitzRoy, 4th Duke of Grafton. Her dam, Woodbine was a half-sister to the good broodmare Hornby Lass and herself produced several other winners including the 1815 Oaks winner Minuet. Music was sired by the 1790 Epsom Derby winner Waxy, who became an influential and important stallion, siring two additional Oaks winners and four winners of the Derby. Grafton sent the filly to be trained at Newmarket by Robert Robson, the so-called "Emperor of Trainers".

== Racing career ==
=== 1813: three-year-old season ===
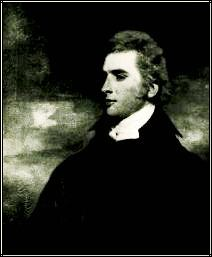
The Duke of Grafton, who owned Music

Music began her racing career on 20 April 1813 at the Newmarket Craven meeting where she started 5/6 favourite for a five furlong Sweepstakes for three-year-old fillies. She finished last of the three runners behind Poodle (owned by the Duke of Grafton's cousin General Thomas Grosvenor and the Duke of Rutland's unnamed chestnut filly who ran a dead heat. At the next Newmarket meeting two weeks later, Music was moved up in class and matched against colt's in the fifth running of the 2000 Guineas over the Rowley Mile course (the 1000 Guineas for fillies was not established until a year later). Music was one of the outsiders in the twelve runner field but exceeded expectations to finish second to the "very easy" winner Smolensko, a colt who went on to win The Derby. On the following day Music challenged Smolensko again in the Newmarket Stakes but on this occasion she finished out of the first four.

On 4 June Music returned to competing against her own sex in the Oaks Stakes over one and a half miles at Epsom. Ridden by Tom Goodisson, she was made the 5/2 favourite against eight other fillies including Wilful, who was also owned by the Duke of Grafton and trained by Robert Robson. The race was marked by an incident on the turn into the straight when one of the fillies fell collided with a post and fell, bringing down one of the other runners. Vale Royal, ridden by Sam Chifney, led until the straight when she was overtaken by Music, Wilful and General Grosvenor's filly Vulpecula. After what the Sporting Magazine described as being "as fine a race as was ever run over Epsom course" Music prevailed from Vulpecula and Wilful, the first three having all been bred by the 3rd Duke of Grafton.

Music did not run again until the First October meeting at Newmarket when she ran in the Trial Stakes over the Ditch Mile course. She was made favourite but finished fourth of the six runners behind Lord Sackville's unnamed filly. On 3 November Music ran her last race in the Duke of Grafton's scarlet colours when she finished fourth behind Lord Sackville's colt Mulberry in a race over the last three miles of the Beacon Course.

At the end of the year both Music and Wilful were "sold and sent to Ireland".

=== 1814: four-year-old season ===
Music made one appearance in 1814 for her new owner, Mr J. Bruen. At the Curragh on 30 April she ran in a King's Plate over three miles and finished last of the four runners behind Mr Copley's colt Steersman. On 18 June Music was scheduled to take part in a three-way match at the Curragh involving Wilful and Lord Cremorne's filly The Doubt, but Bruen withdrew both his fillies and paid a forfeit.

== Stud record ==
Music was retired from racing to become a broodmare in Ireland but had no impact at stud. None of her offspring were recorded in the General Stud Book.

== Pedigree ==
Pedigree of Music (GB), bay mare, 1810
| Sire Waxy (GB) 1790 | Pot-8-Os; 1773 | Eclipse | Marske |
| Sire Waxy (GB) 1790 | Pot-8-Os; 1773 | Eclipse | Spilletta |
| Sire Waxy (GB) 1790 | Pot-8-Os; 1773 | Sportsmistress | Sportsman |
| Sire Waxy (GB) 1790 | Pot-8-Os; 1773 | Sportsmistress | Golden Locks |
| Sire Waxy (GB) 1790 | Maria; 1777 | Herod | Tartar |
| Sire Waxy (GB) 1790 | Maria; 1777 | Herod | Cypron |
| Sire Waxy (GB) 1790 | Maria; 1777 | Lisette | Snap |
| Sire Waxy (GB) 1790 | Maria; 1777 | Lisette | Miss Windsor |
| Dam Woodbine (GB) 1791 | Woodpecker; 1773 | Herod | Tartar |
| Dam Woodbine (GB) 1791 | Woodpecker; 1773 | Herod | Cypron |
| Dam Woodbine (GB) 1791 | Woodpecker; 1773 | Miss Ramsden | Cade |
| Dam Woodbine (GB) 1791 | Woodpecker; 1773 | Miss Ramsden | Lonsdale mare |
| Dam Woodbine (GB) 1791 | Puzzle; 1778 | Matchem | Cade |
| Dam Woodbine (GB) 1791 | Puzzle; 1778 | Matchem | sister 2 to Miss Partner |
| Dam Woodbine (GB) 1791 | Puzzle; 1778 | Princess | Herod |
| Dam Woodbine (GB) 1791 | Puzzle; 1778 | Princess | Julia (Family 1-a) |

- Music was inbred 3 x 3 x 4 to Herod, meaning that this stallion appears in twice in the third and once in the fourth generation of her pedigree. She was also inbred 4 x 4 to Cade.
