= Minuet (horse) =

British Thoroughbred racehorse

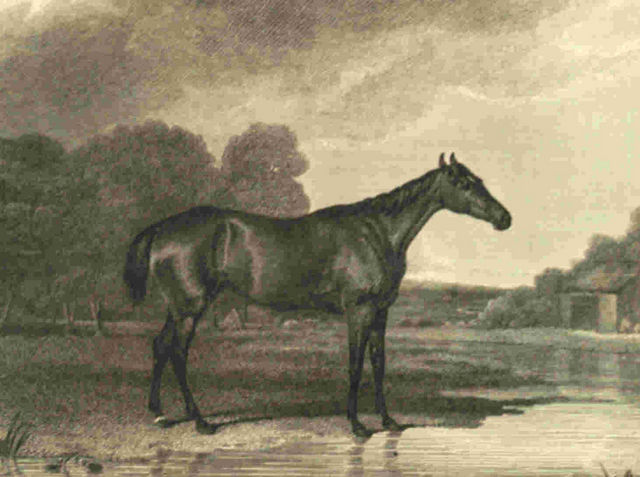
- Sire: Waxy
- Grandsire: Potoooooooo
- Dam: Woodbine
- Damsire: Woodpecker
- Sex: Mare
- Foaled: 1812
- Country: United Kingdom of Great Britain and Ireland
- Colour: Bay
- Breeder: George FitzRoy, 4th Duke of Grafton
- Owner: 4th Duke of Grafton
- Trainer: Robert Robson
- Record: 21:9-7-3

Major wins
- July Stakes (1814); Oaks Stakes (1815); Match against Fugitive (1816); King's Purse (Chelmsford) (1816); Trial Stakes (1816); Match against Duenna (1816); King's Plate (Newmarket) (1817)

Minuet (1812–1833) was a British Thoroughbred racehorse and broodmare who won the classic Oaks Stakes at Epsom Downs Racecourse in 1815. In a racing career which lasted from July 1814 until October 1817 she competed twenty-one times, winning nine races and being placed on a further ten occasions. On her only race in 1814, she won the July Stakes, one of the year's most important races for two-year-olds. In the following year she finished second in the 1000 Guineas on her debut and then won her next three races including the Oaks. Minuet stayed in training for two further seasons, winning five more races including a victory over a strong field in the all-aged Trial Stakes in September 1816. After her retirement from racing she had some success as a broodmare, breeding several winners.

== Background ==
Minuet was a bay mare bred by her owner George FitzRoy, 4th Duke of Grafton at his stud at Euston Hall in Suffolk. Her dam, Woodbine was a half-sister to the good broodmare Hornby Lass and herself produced several other winners including the 1813 Oaks winner Music. Minuet was sired by the 1790 Epsom Derby winner Waxy, who became an influential and important stallion, siring two additional Oaks winners and four winners of the Derby. Grafton sent the filly to be trained at Newmarket by Robert Robson, the so-called "Emperor of Trainers".

== Racing career ==
=== 1814: two-year-old season ===
In 1814 most Thoroughbreds began their careers as three-year-olds and races for two-year-olds were few. The longest established and most important race for juveniles was the July Stakes, run over five furlongs on the opening day of the Newmarket July meeting. The race attracted 19 entries in 1814, 13 of whom appeared for the race on 13 July. Minuet was made second favourite at odds of 4/1 and won the race, beating General Gower's unnamed chestnut filly. Minuet did not race again in 1814.

=== 1815: three-year-old season ===
Minuet's first race of 1815 came in the second running of the 1000 Guineas Stakes at Newmarket on 27 April. Her three rivals for the race over the Ditch Mile course included her stable companion Discord and an unnamed filly by Selim owned by Lord Foley. Minuet started the 1/2 favourite and finished second to the Selim filly. Two days after her defeat in the classic Minuet ran a match race over the Abington Mile against a filly by Gamenut and won at odds of 1/10 to claim a prize of 200 guineas. On 26 May at Epsom Minuet stepped up in distance for the Oaks Stakes over one and a half miles. She was again matched against the Selim filly and the two started 3/1 joint favourites in a field of twelve. Ridden by Tom Goodisson, Grafton's filly raced in third place as S. Barnett set a very strong pace on Mr Craven's Nadejda. Minuet took the lead in the closing stages and won "cleverly" from Lord George Cavendish's filly Mouse, with Nadejda in third place. The race was marred by the death of the Selim filly, who was euthanised after dislocating a shoulder in a heavy fall a furlong from the finish. Minuet's success was the second of twenty classics won by the Duke of Grafton as an owner, and his first of nineteen as a breeder. In the summer of 1815, Minuet was one of three of Grafton's "celebrated" horses, the others being Whisker and Partisan, to be painted by the artist Abraham Cooper.

After a break of more than four months, Minuet returned to racing at the Newmarket First October meeting. She started even-money favourite against five opponents in a ten-furlong Sweepstakes and won from a filly owned by Lord George Cavendish. On the opening day of the Second October meeting Minuet won a prize of 40 guineas without having to race when her opponent, a colt named Castanet, was withdrawn from a scheduled match race over five furlongs. Three days later Minuet sustained her first defeat since the 1000 Guineas when she finished last of the three runners in a handicap Sweepstakes in which she carried twelve pounds more than the winner, a colt named Fandango. On 1 November at the Houghton meeting Minuet finished second to a colt named Cashew, to whom she was conceding fourteen pounds, in the Newmarket Gold Cup. Three days later she ended her season by finishing second in a ten-furlong handicap, again conceding weight to the winner.

=== 1816: four-year-old season ===
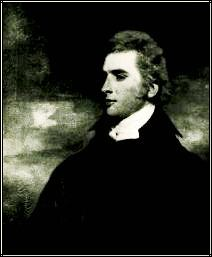
The Duke of Grafton, who bred and owned Minuet

Minuet began her third season by finishing second to the 1815 2000 Guineas winner Tigris in a race at the Newmarket Craven meeting in April. She sustained her fifth consecutive defeat on the opening day of the Second Spring meeting when she finished last of the three runners behind the five-year-old Wanderer in a handicap over ten furlongs.

On the opening day of the Newmarket July meeting, Minuet returned to winning form by beating Lord Jersey's horse Fugitive in a match race over the Ditch Mile course, winning a prize of 100 guineas. Later that month, Minuet traveled away from Newmarket for the first time since her Oaks win when she was sent to contest a King's Purse for mares at Chelmsford Racecourse. No horses appeared to oppose her and she was allowed to walk over the two-mile course to claim a prize of 100 guineas.

Minuet returned to Newmarket for the Trial Stakes on 30 September. Racing over the Ditch Mile course, she started the 3/1 second favourite in a field of nine runners. She won the race from Discord with Perchance in third place and Tigris, the odds on favourite, unplaced. Four days later, Minuet ended her season with a win as she successfully conceded eight pounds to Lord Foley's filly Duenna in a 200 guinea match over the Ditch Mile.

=== 1817: five-year-old season ===
Minuet extended her winning run to five on her five-year-old debut. On 22 April at Newmarket she won a King's Plate over the last three miles of the Beacon Course, beating Discord and The Lovely Maid. Three days later Minuet raced against the 1816 1000 Guineas winner Rhoda in a Subscription Handicap and finished second to the younger filly, to whom she was attempting to concede eighteen pounds. Minuet ran twice without success at the next Newmarket meeting in May: she finished second in a five furlong handicap, carrying twenty pounds more than the winner and then finished out of the first three in a handicap over ten furlongs two days later. The latter race saw Minuet finish unplaced for the first time in an eighteen race career.

In Autumn, Minuet attempted to win the Trial Stakes for a second time, but finished unplaced behind George Cavendish's six-year-old Bourbon. Two days later, the mare ran in a two-runner race over the Beacon Course in which she was beaten by Sir Richard, a four-year-old colt. Minuet's last race was an Oatlands Stakes on 16 October over the Rowley Mile course in which she finished third of the six runners behind a four-year-old colt named Sovereign.

== Breeding record ==
Minuet was retired from racing to become a broodmare at the Duke of Grafton's stud, where she was bred to leading stallions including Phantom, Emilius, Partisan and Comus. She produced several winners, all of whose names began with the letter "B" including Banquo, Bolivar, Burman, Blassis and Balance. The best of her progeny was probably Bolero, a colt who finished second in the 2000 Guineas and won the Grand Duke Michael Stakes at Newmarket in 1825. Minuet was euthanised in 1833.

== Pedigree ==
Pedigree of Minuet (GB), bay mare, 1812
Sire Waxy (GB) 1790	Pot-8-Os; 1773	Eclipse	Marske
Sire Waxy (GB) 1790	Pot-8-Os; 1773	Eclipse	Spilletta
Sire Waxy (GB) 1790	Pot-8-Os; 1773	Sportsmistress	Sportsman
Sire Waxy (GB) 1790	Pot-8-Os; 1773	Sportsmistress	Golden Locks
Sire Waxy (GB) 1790	Maria; 1777	Herod	Tartar
Sire Waxy (GB) 1790	Maria; 1777	Herod	Cypron
Sire Waxy (GB) 1790	Maria; 1777	Lisette	Snap
Sire Waxy (GB) 1790	Maria; 1777	Lisette	Miss Windsor
Dam Woodbine (GB) 1791	Woodpecker; 1773	Herod	Tartar
Dam Woodbine (GB) 1791	Woodpecker; 1773	Herod	Cypron
Dam Woodbine (GB) 1791	Woodpecker; 1773	Miss Ramsden	Cade
Dam Woodbine (GB) 1791	Woodpecker; 1773	Miss Ramsden	Lonsdale mare
Dam Woodbine (GB) 1791	Puzzle; 1778	Matchem	Cade
Dam Woodbine (GB) 1791	Puzzle; 1778	Matchem	sister 2 to Miss Partner
Dam Woodbine (GB) 1791	Puzzle; 1778	Princess	Herod
Dam Woodbine (GB) 1791	Puzzle; 1778	Princess	Julia (Family 1-a)

- Minuet was inbred 3 × 3 × 4 to Herod, meaning that this stallion appears in twice in the third and once in the fourth generation of her pedigree. She was also inbred 4 × 4 to Cade.
