= Cotherstone (horse) =

British-bred Thoroughbred racehorse

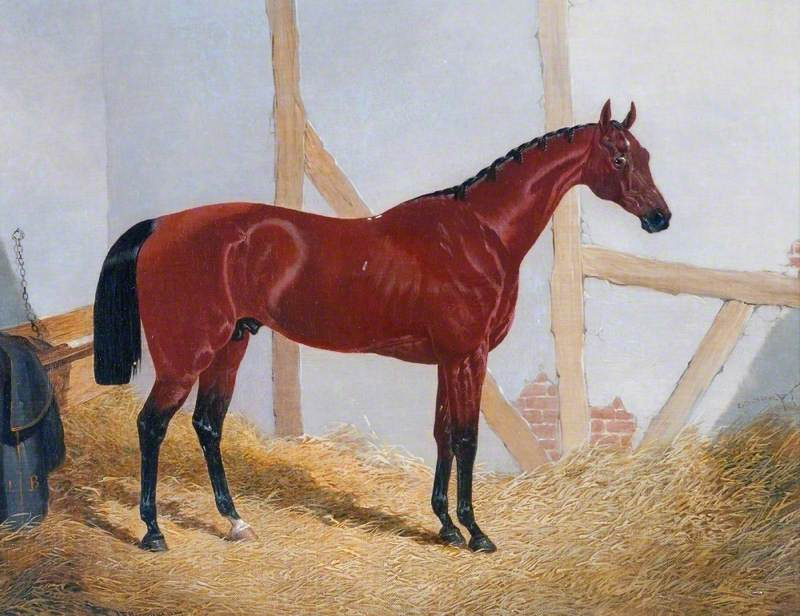
- Cotherstone, by John Frederick Herring Jr.
- Sire: Touchstone
- Grandsire: Camel
- Dam: Emma
- Damsire: Whisker
- Sex: Stallion
- Foaled: 1840
- Country: United Kingdom of Great Britain and Ireland
- Colour: Bay
- Breeder: John Bowes
- Owner: John Bowes; John Spencer, 3rd Earl Spencer
- Trainer: John Scott
- Record: 11:8-1-0

Major wins
- 2000 Guineas (1843); Epsom Derby (1843)

Cotherstone (1840–1864) was a British Thoroughbred racehorse and sire. In a career that lasted from September 1841 to July 1843 he ran eleven times and won eight races. After being beaten on his debut, Cotherstone won his next six races including the 1843 2000 Guineas and Epsom Derby. A narrow defeat in the St. Leger Stakes prevented him from being recognised as the first winner of the English Triple Crown. He was regarded by contemporary experts as one of the best British racehorses of his era. After sustaining a serious injury in his only race in 1844 he was retired to stud where he had moderate success.

== Background ==
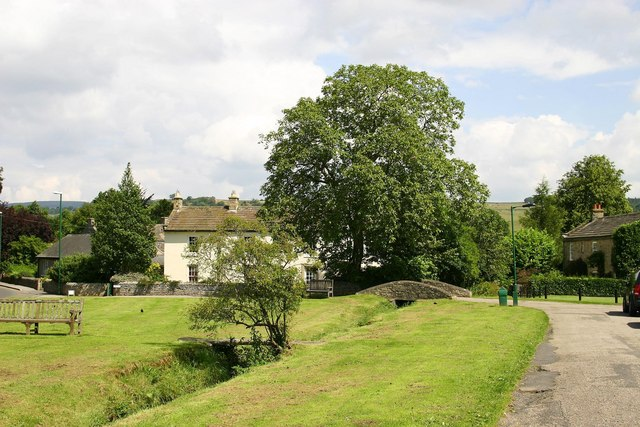
John Bowes named his colt after the village of Cotherstone.

Cotherstone was a "bright" bay horse with a small white star and one white pastern, standing 15.2 hands high, bred by his owner John Bowes at his stud at Streatlam Castle in County Durham. Bowes named the colt after a nearby village. Cotherstone's dam was a mare named Emma, who had already produced the 1835 Derby winner Mündig, and went on to give birth to Mowerina, the dam of the Triple Crown winner West Australian. His sire, Touchstone, won the St Leger and two Ascot Gold Cups, before going on to be an outstandingly successful stallion. Apart from Cotherstone, his classic winners included Surplice, Orlando and Newminster and he was Champion sire on four occasions.

Bowes sent Cotherstone into training with John Scott who trained forty classic winners from his base at Whitewall stables, Malton, North Yorkshire. The colt was ridden in most of his important races by the trainer's younger brother, Bill Scott. Cotherstone was not an impressive individual at first, being weak and sickly as a yearling, and making little progress as a two-year-old. He was described as being "thin-fleshed" and "always amiss".

== Racing career ==
=== 1842: two-year-old season ===
Cotherstone began to show potential towards the end of 1842 and despite being beaten in a private trial race by a colt named The Era (a future Northumberland Plate winner), he was sent to run at Newmarket in the autumn. Before he ran, Cotherstone had been introduced into the betting lists for the following year's Derby, with bookmakers offering odds of 20/1 on 20 October. On 24 October he made his public debut when he ran in the Criterion Stakes in which he finished unplaced behind Gaper, Pineapple and Testy. Four days later he reappeared in the Nursery Stakes in which he ran a dead-heat with an unnamed filly later called Mania. The owners of the two winners agreed to divide the prize money. Cotherstone's efforts at Newmarket did not impress the bookmakers and his odds for the Derby drifted out to 50/1. At the end of 1842, Bowes lost patience with the colt and planned to sell him to Scott, but the deal fell through at the last moment.

=== 1843: three-year-old season ===
==== Spring ====
In early 1843 an impressive performance in a training gallop with a good horse name All Fours convinced Bowes and John Scott that Cotherstone was a serious contender for the Derby. Bill Scott, who rode the colt in the trial was convinced that he was the best that he had ever ridden. Bowes placed a series of large bets on the colt and arranged for strict security measures at the Malton stables to protect him from any attempts by unscrupulous bookmakers to "nobble" (deliberately injure) him. Cotherstone made his first public appearance as a three-year-old at the Craven meeting at Newmarket on 17 April when ran in the Riddlesworth Stakes. Ridden by Frank Butler, he settled in second place before going clear in the closing stages to win by three lengths from Pompey. His odds for the Derby were immediately shortened from 20/1 to 12/1. Two days later he added the Column Produce Stakes, in which the beaten horses included the filly Extempore, who went on to win the 1000 Guineas. So impressive were Cotherstone's performances that when he returned to Newmarket for the 2000 Guineas at the Spring meeting, only two horses turned out to oppose him. Starting at odds of 1/3 he won by three lengths in "a mere canter" from Cornopean and Mallard.

==== Summer ====
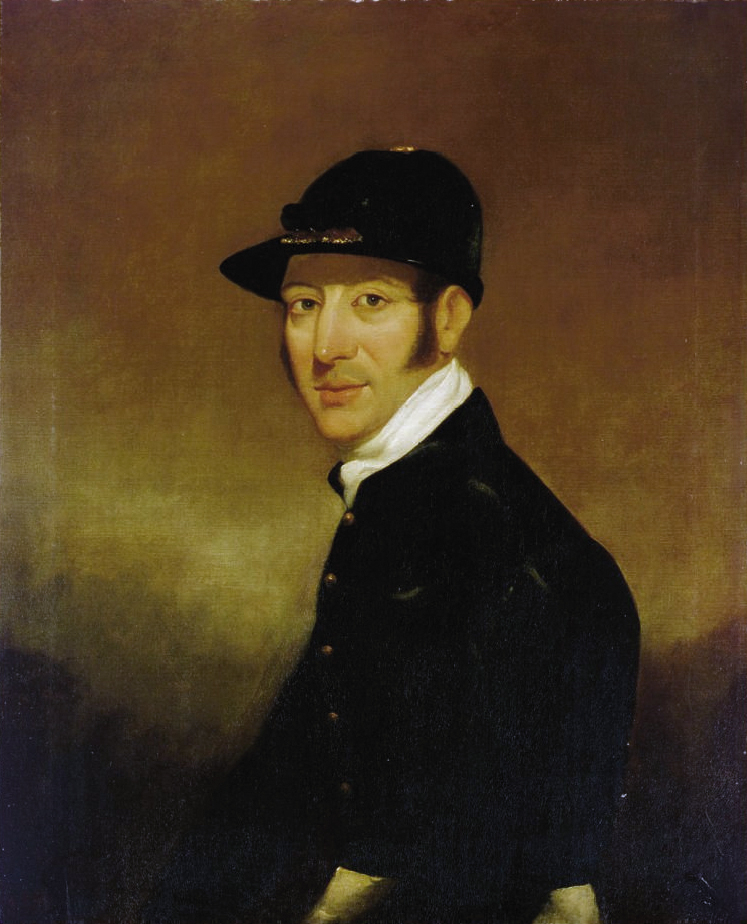
Bill Scott called Cotherstone the best colt he ever rode.

Shortly before the 1843 Derby, John Scott moved Cotherstone from Malton to complete his preparations at a stable at Leatherhead, where the colt was visited and viewed at exercise by the Queen and Prince Albert. At Epsom on 31 May, Cotherstone started 13/8 favourite for the Derby in a field of twenty-three runners, with Gaper being made second choice at 5/1. Despite the damp and misty weather, the race attracted the customary huge crowd, which included Prince George of Cambridge and his brother-in-law the Prince Royal of Mecklenburg. After a delay caused by the behaviour of a colt named Highlander, the race began with Gaper taking an early lead. The second favourite set such a strong pace that most of the runners were soon struggling and only four other horses– Khorassan, Cotherstone, Siricol and Gorhambury– were still in contention when the leader turned into the straight. Gaper then began to tire and Bill Scott sent Cotherstone into the lead a quarter of a mile from the finish. Gorhambury (rumoured to be a four-year-old "ringer") emerged as his only challenger, but the result was never in serious doubt as the favourite steadily increased his advantage to win easily by two lengths. Apart from the £4,250 prize money, Bowes took an estimated £30,000 in winning bets. Celebrations at Malton were delayed, however, as the homing pigeons dispatched to convey the news of Cotherstone's victory failed to arrive.

On his first race after the Derby, Cotherstone was sent to Goodwood. On 25 July he took the Gratwicke Stakes by two lengths from Khorassan, winning a first prize of £2,150. Regarding the ease of Cotherstone's victory, the Sporting magazine commented that "it would indeed be a mockery to call this a race".

==== Autumn ====
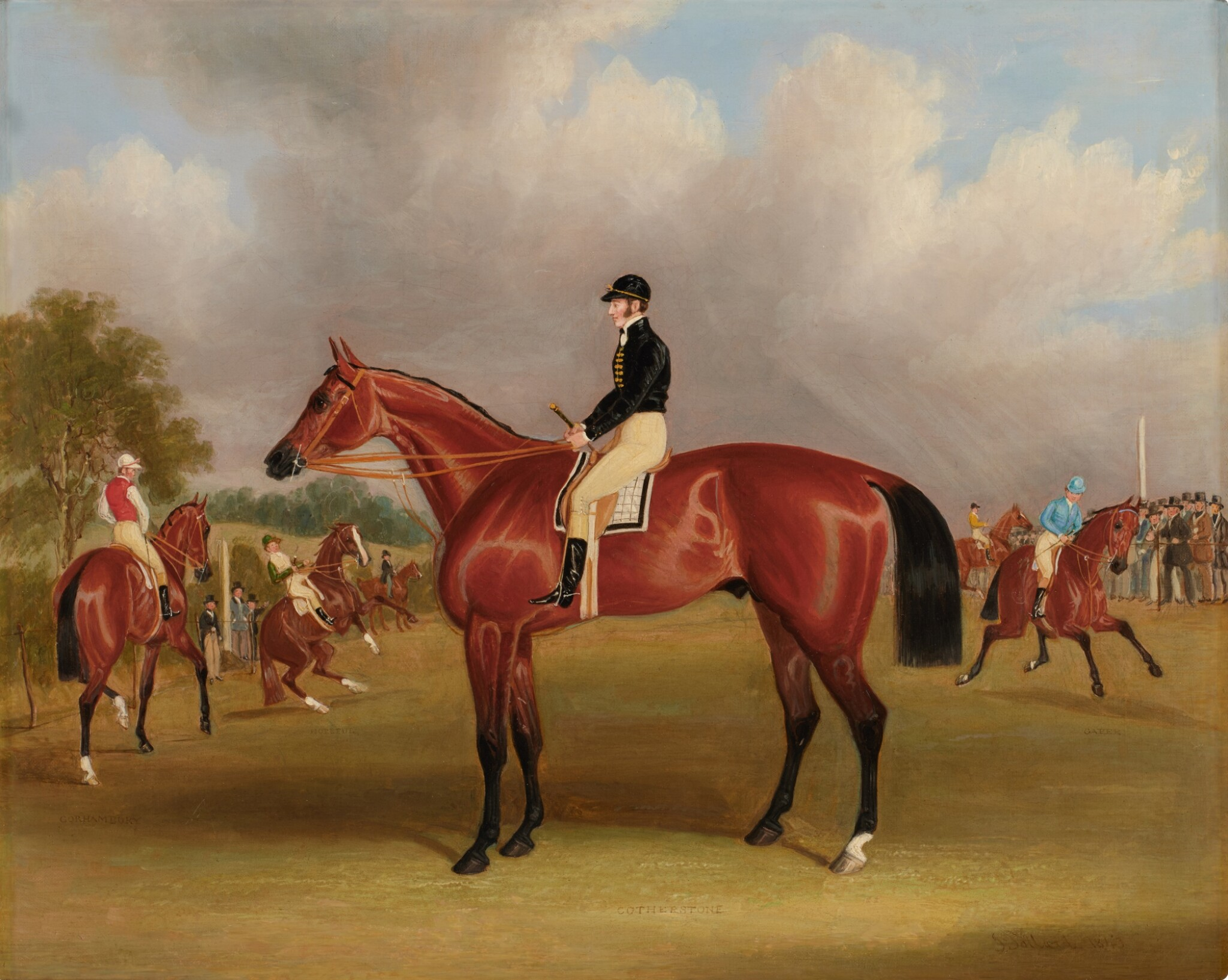
Cotherstone with jockey, in the black jacket of John Bowes (James Pollard)

On 12 September, Cotherstone traveled from Malton to Doncaster where he attempted to become the first horse to win the 2000 Guineas, the Derby and the St Leger. Although these races were recognised as the most important races of the year for three-year-old colts, the term "Triple Crown" did not come into common use for another thirty years. With Bill Scott injured, Frank Butler took the ride, and Cotherstone started the 4/6 favourite against eight opponents. His odds had drifted out from 1/2 just before the race as a great number of bets were placed on his stable companion Prizefighter. Prizefighter set off in front, set a very strong pace and was still leading in the straight. Cotherstone moved up to contest the lead together with the outsider Nutwith and the three colts raced together throughout the final quarter of a mile. Cotherstone held a slight lead inside the final furlong, but Nutwith, under a strong ride from Job Marson, caught him in the last strides and won by a head with Prizefighter a neck away in third. There was considerable anger after the race among followers of the Scott stable who felt that the race tactics had not suited either of their runners. There were also allegations that Frank Butler, had "pulled" Cotherstone (held him back to prevent him from winning) on the orders of John Gully, who had wagered heavily on Prizefighter.

Two days later, Cotherstone reappeared to win the £200 Three Year Old Stakes, easily beating Napier by two lengths. On his final start of the season, Cotherstone ran in the valuable Royal Stakes at Newmarket in October. Carrying a ten pound weight penalty, he won the £1,195 prize "without an effort" by a length from Fakeaway. Cotherstone's seven wins in 1843 earned his owner at least £12,765, making him the most successful horse of the year in Britain: the second highest earner was Gaper with £3,600 Later reports give Cotherstone's winnings as £13,790

=== 1844: four-year-old season ===
Before he ran as a four-year-old, Cotherstone was sold for 3,000 guineas as a potential Stallion to Lord Spencer. He made his first and only appearance of the year in a Sweepstakes at Goodwood. He broke down injured in the race, and never ran again.

== Assessment ==
Cotherstone was held in extremely high regard by contemporary observers. Commenting on his defeat in the St Leger the American Turf Register and Sporting Magazine described Cotherstone as "the best horse we have had for years", while a writer in the 1844 edition of the New Sporting Almanack referred to him as "the greatest winner of these modern days" and compared him to the 18th-century champions Flying Childers and Eclipse. "Sylvanus", writing in Bentley's Miscellany, called Cotherstone "as magnificent an animal as ever rounded Tattenham Corner".

== Stud career ==
Cotherstone was retired to stand as a stallion at Lord Spencer's stud at Althorp, where he sired a few good horses without ever living up to expectations. The best of his progeny were Speed the Plough, who won the Criterion Stakes and the Stewards' Cup winners Glenmasson and Pumicestone. He was also successful as a sire of hunters and show horses. According to one account, Cotherstone was not exercised in retirement and became grossly overweight, seldom moving from his box for years at a time. By the time he was visited by "The Druid" (E. H. Dixon) in 1861 however, he seemed to be in good health and was dividing his time between quietly grazing and walking round the sunny side of his paddock. He died in April 1864.

== Sire line tree ==
- Cotherstone
  - Stilton
  - Speed The Plough
  - Pumicestone
  - Woodcote
  - Spencer
  - Glenmasson
    - Vestminster
      - Loeffler

== Pedigree ==
Pedigree of Cotherstone (GB), bay stallion, 1840
Sire Touchstone (GB) 1833	Camel; 1826	Whalebone	Waxy*
Sire Touchstone (GB) 1833	Camel; 1826	Whalebone	Penelope*
Sire Touchstone (GB) 1833	Camel; 1826	Selim mare	Selim
Sire Touchstone (GB) 1833	Camel; 1826	Selim mare	Maiden
Sire Touchstone (GB) 1833	Banter; 1823	Master Henry	Orville
Sire Touchstone (GB) 1833	Banter; 1823	Master Henry	Miss Sophia
Sire Touchstone (GB) 1833	Banter; 1823	Boadicea	Alexander
Sire Touchstone (GB) 1833	Banter; 1823	Boadicea	Brunette
Dam Emma (GB) 1843	Whisker; 1836	Waxy*	Potoooooooo
Dam Emma (GB) 1843	Whisker; 1836	Waxy*	Maria
Dam Emma (GB) 1843	Whisker; 1836	Penelope*	Trumpator
Dam Emma (GB) 1843	Whisker; 1836	Penelope*	Prunella
Dam Emma (GB) 1843	Gibside Fairy; 1831	Hermes	Mercury
Dam Emma (GB) 1843	Gibside Fairy; 1831	Hermes	Rosina
Dam Emma (GB) 1843	Gibside Fairy; 1831	Vicissitude	Pipator
Dam Emma (GB) 1843	Gibside Fairy; 1831	Vicissitude	Beatrice (Family:7-a)

* Cotherstone is inbred 4S x 3D to the stallion Waxy, meaning that he appears fourth generation on the sire side of his pedigree, and third generation on the dam side of his pedigree.

* Cotherstone is inbred 4S x 3D to the mare Penelope, meaning that she appears fourth generation on the sire side of his pedigree, and third generation on the dam side of his pedigree.
