= Memnon (horse) =

British-bred Thoroughbred racehorse

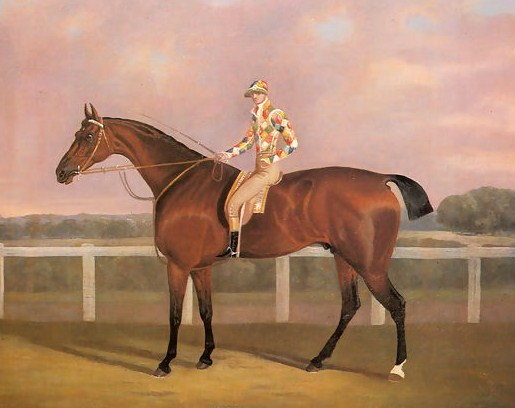
- Memnon by Clifton Tomson (1775-1828)
- Sire: Whisker
- Grandsire: Waxy
- Dam: Manuella
- Damsire: Dick Andrews
- Sex: Stallion
- Foaled: 1822
- Country: United Kingdom
- Colour: Bay
- Breeder: Richard Watt
- Owner: Richard Watt; William Vane, 1st Duke of Cleveland
- Trainer: Richard Shepherd; William Chifney
- Record: 15: 9-4-1

Major wins
- Champagne Stakes (1824); York St Leger Stakes (1825); Great St Leger Stakes (1825); Ascot Gold Cup (1827)

Memnon (foaled 1822) was a British Thoroughbred racehorse and sire best known for winning the classic St Leger Stakes in 1825. In a racing career which lasted from 1824 until 1828 he ran fifteen times and won nine races. Bred and originally trained in Yorkshire, he was unbeaten in two races as two-year-old in 1824, including the Champagne Stakes and won the York version of the St Leger the following spring. In the St Leger at Doncaster in September 1825, he was successful as the heavily backed favourite in a record field of thirty runners. Memnon was later trained at Newmarket and recorded his most important subsequent victory when winning the Ascot Gold Cup as a five-year-old in 1827. After standing as a breeding stallion for five years in England with moderate results, he was sold and exported to Russia.

== Background ==
Memnon was a "long, loose, big and leggy" bay horse with one white foot bred at Bishop Burton in Yorkshire by Richard Watt. Memnon was sired by the Duke of Grafton's horse Whisker who won the 1815 Epsom Derby before becoming a successful breeding stallion. His dam Manuella, who was also bred by Richard Watt, won The Oaks in 1812 and retired from racing to become a broodmare at Watt's stud. Apart from Memnon, she produced the successful racehorses Belzoni and Belshazar, as well as the influential broodmare Margellina.

== Racing career ==
=== 1824: two-year-old season ===
Memnon made his first racecourse appearance on 18 September at the St Leger meeting at Doncaster Racecourse. He started the 4/5 favourite for the second running of the Champagne Stakes, one of the year's most important races for two-year-olds. Ridden by Bill Scott, he won from Lord Queensberry's colt The Alderman and two others. Five days later he faced twelve opponents in a sweepstakes over the same course and distance. Memnon won at odds of 5/1, with The Alderman again taking second place.

=== 1825: three-year-old season ===
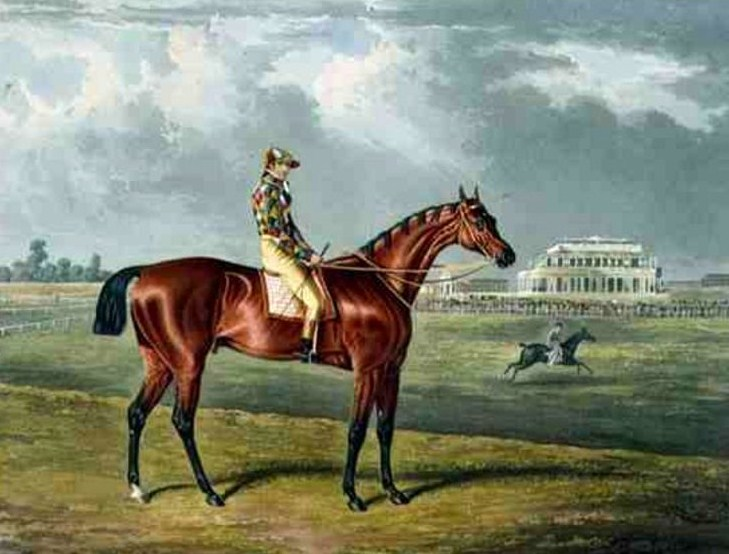
'Memnon', the Winner of the Great St. Leger at Doncaster, 1825 by John Frederick Herring, Sr.

Memnon made his first appearance of the season at York Racecourse on 9 May when he contested a "St Leger Stakes". The success of the St Leger at Doncaster had led other major courses, including York and Newmarket to use the name for their own long distance races for three-year-olds; the original race was renamed the "Great St Leger" for several years to distinguish itself from the imitators. Memnon started 4/6 favourite for the York race, and won from Lord Kelburne's colt Dare Devil.

After a break of more than four months, Memnon returned for the fiftieth running of the Great St Leger at Doncaster on 20 September. Ridden as usual by Bill Scott, he started the 3/1 favourite against twenty-nine colts and fillies, the largest field assembled for the classic up to that time. Memnon won the race easily by three lengths from his old rival The Alderman. The beaten horses included a filly named Fleur de Lis who was reportedly "thrown down" during the race. Betting on the race had been heavy and among the winners were Robert Ridsdale and John Gully, who reportedly won £31,000 and £16,000 respectively on the result.

By the time he appeared in the Gascoigne Stakes two days later Memnon had been sold by Watt for 3,500 guineas to Lord Darlington, later to become the 1st Duke of Cleveland. The colt won the prize for his new owner without having to race as the other eight entries were withdrawn, allowing him to walk over.

=== 1826: four-year-old season ===
Memnon's third season began when he ran in the Gold Cup at Manchester Racecourse in Lancashire on 18 May. He started odds-on favourite against three opponents, but lost his undefeated record as he was beaten by a filly named Signorina. Memnon returned to Yorkshire in August for the four-year-old division of the Great Subscription Purse. He was made 2/7 favourite, but was defeated by his only opponent, Lord Kelburne's colt Actaeon.

A year after his classic win, Memnon appeared at Doncaster in September, but avoided potential clashes with Fleur-de-Lis and Actaeon in the Doncaster Stakes and Doncaster Cup as a result of some "blundering" with his entries. Instead, he walked over for a sweepstakes over the St Leger course on 20 September and won a four-mile event on the following afternoon. In the latter race he defeated the five-year-old Florismart by half a head after a "beautiful and severe race".

=== 1827: five-year-old season ===
For the 1827 season, Memnon was moved south to be trained at Newmarket by William Chifney, and was ridden in most of his subsequent races by his new trainer's brother Samuel Chifney, Jr. On 15 May at Newmarket Racecourse, Memnon made his five-year-old debut in a 1,000 guinea match race over ten furlongs in which he easily defeated Lord Exeter's Enamel, the winner of the 1822 2000 Guineas. A month later, Memnon appeared at Ascot Racecourse where he contested the twenty-first running of the Gold Cup. Ridden by Sam Chifney, he started 1/2 favourite for the two and a half mile race and won impressively by two lengths from King George IV's horse Mortgage and three others.

In autumn, Memnon appeared at the Doncaster St Leger meeting for the fourth year in succession, but on this occasion, he failed to win a race. On 18 September he lost by a neck to Fleur-de-Lis at level weights in the two-mile Doncaster Stakes. Two days later he started second favourite for the Doncaster Cup over two miles five furlongs against a field which included Fleur-de-Lis, Actaeon and the 1826 St Leger winner Tarrare. He dead-heated with Fleur-de-Lis for second place behind Lord Fitzwilliam's four-year-old Mulatto. Memnon was scheduled to run a three-mile match race against The Alderman at Newmarket in October, but his opponent failed to appear, leaving Lord Darlington to collect a 250 guineas forfeit.

=== 1828: six-year-old season ===
Memnon remained in training as a six-year-old but failed to show any worthwhile form. In April he finished last of the five runners when carrying top weight of 128 pounds in the two-mile Oatlands Stakes at Newmarket, and a month later finished third of four behind Chateau Margaux in the Jockey Club Plate over the four-mile Beacon Course. In October Memnon was scheduled to challenge for The Whip, a silver trophy which was said to incorporate hairs from the tail and mane of Eclipse, but he failed to appear for the race, allowing Colonel Wilson's Lamplighter to claim the prize.

== Stud career ==
Memnon was retired from racing to become a breeding stallion at Lord Cleveland's stud at Raby Castle. By 1831 he was standing at a fee of 10 guineas a mare at J Painter's stables at Dean's Hill, Staffordshire. The most successful of his British offspring was King Cole, who won the Chester Cup in 1838. In 1833 he was sold and exported to Russia.

== Pedigree ==
Pedigree of Memnon (GB), bay stallion, 1822
Sire Whisker (GB) 1812	Waxy; 1790	Potoooooooo*	Eclipse*
Sire Whisker (GB) 1812	Waxy; 1790	Potoooooooo*	Sportsmistress*
Sire Whisker (GB) 1812	Waxy; 1790	Maria	Herod
Sire Whisker (GB) 1812	Waxy; 1790	Maria	Lisette
Sire Whisker (GB) 1812	Penelope; 1798	Trumpator	Conductor
Sire Whisker (GB) 1812	Penelope; 1798	Trumpator	Brunette
Sire Whisker (GB) 1812	Penelope; 1798	Prunella	Highflyer*
Sire Whisker (GB) 1812	Penelope; 1798	Prunella	Promise
Dam Manuella (GB) 1809	Dick Andrews; 1797	Joe Andrews	Eclipse*
Dam Manuella (GB) 1809	Dick Andrews; 1797	Joe Andrews	Amaranda
Dam Manuella (GB) 1809	Dick Andrews; 1797	Highflyer mare	Highflyer*
Dam Manuella (GB) 1809	Dick Andrews; 1797	Highflyer mare	Cardinal Puff mare
Dam Manuella (GB) 1809	Mandane; 1800	Potoooooooo*	Eclipse*
Dam Manuella (GB) 1809	Mandane; 1800	Potoooooooo*	Sportsmistress*
Dam Manuella (GB) 1809	Mandane; 1800	Young Camilla	Woodpecker*
Dam Manuella (GB) 1809	Mandane; 1800	Young Camilla	Camilla (Family:11-g)

* Memnon is inbred 3S x 3D to the stallion Potoooooooo, meaning that he appears third generation on the sire side of his pedigree, and third generation on the dam side of his pedigree.

* Memnon is inbred 4S x 4D x 4D to the stallion Eclipse, meaning that he appears fourth generation once on the sire side of his pedigree, and fourth generation twice on the dam side of his pedigree.

* Memnon is inbred 4S x 4D to the stallion Highflyer, meaning that he appears fourth generation on the sire side of his pedigree, and fourth generation on the dam side of his pedigree.

* Memnon is inbred 4S x 5S x 5D x 5D to the stallion Herod, meaning that he appears fourth generation and fifth generation (via Highflyer) on the sire side of his pedigree, and fifth generation twice (via Highflyer and Woodpecker) on the dam side of his pedigree.
