= Wizard (horse) =

British-bred Thoroughbred racehorse (1806–1813)

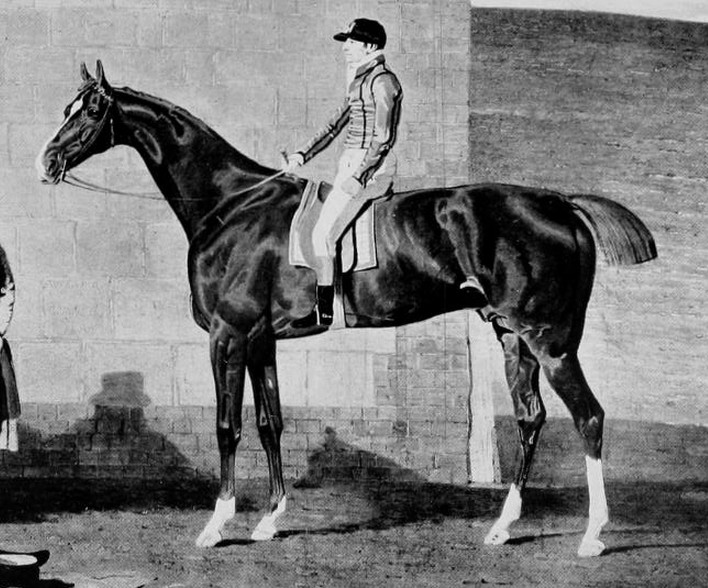
- Portrait of Wizard by Benjamin Marshall
- Sire: Sorcerer
- Grandsire: Trumpator
- Dam: Precipitate mare
- Damsire: Precipitate
- Sex: Stallion
- Foaled: 1806
- Country: United Kingdom
- Colour: Chestnut
- Breeder: Mr. Goodison
- Owner: Christopher Wilson
- Trainer: Tom Perren
- Record: 10: 7-2-0
- Earnings: 3850 gs

Major wins
- Sweepstakes of 100 gs at Newmarket (1809); 2000 Guineas Stakes (1809); Match against Pope (1810); Sweepstakes of 100 gs at Newmarket (1811); Match against Middlethorpe (1811)

Wizard (1806 – 30 June 1813) was a British Thoroughbred racehorse. He won seven of his ten races, with all his wins coming at Newmarket. In 1809 he won the 2000 Guineas Stakes, before finishing second in the Derby Stakes. The following year he won a match race against his Derby conqueror Pope. Throughout his racing career he was owned by Christopher Wilson and trained by Tom Perren. Wizard only stood as a stallion for two years before dying in an accident in 1813. His son Young Wizard won the Riddlesworth Stakes and was the runner-up in the Derby in 1817.

== Background ==
Wizard was a chestnut colt foaled in 1806 and bred by Mr. Goodison. He was sired by Sorcerer, a successful racehorse and three-time Champion sire in Britain. Amongst Sorcerer's other progeny were 2000 Guineas and Derby winner Smolensko, St. Leger winner Soothsayer and the Oaks winners Morel, Maid of Orleans and Sorcery. Wizard's dam was a daughter of Precipitate. Wizard was the second of her ten foals. He was trained by Tom Perren.

== Racing career ==
=== 1809: Three-year-old season ===
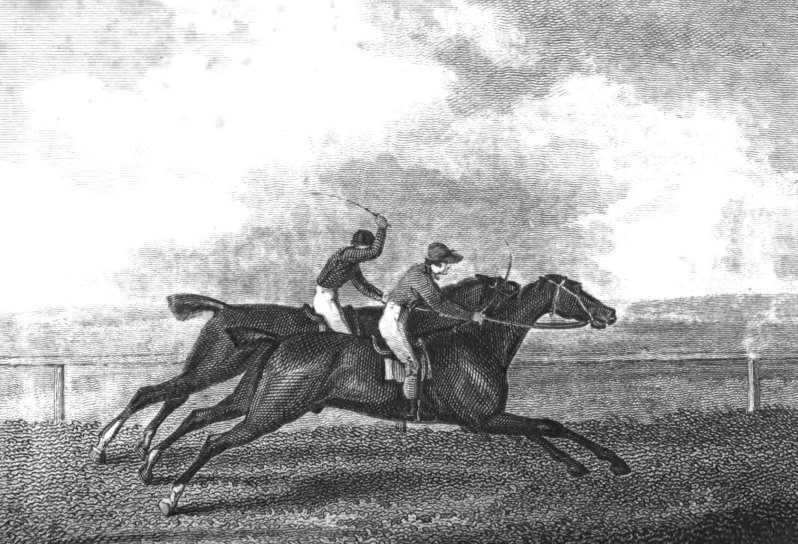
Engraving of Pope (foreground) beating Wizard in the 1809 Epsom Derby

Wizard did not race as a two-year-old and he made his debut on 3 April 1809 in a sweepstakes of 100 guineas each at the Newmarket Craven meeting. Ridden by William Clift, he started the race as the 6/5 favourite and won it easily from Chryseis. Cock Robin finished third, with three others behind him. Two weeks later he started 4/5 favourite for the 2000 Guineas Stakes over the Rowley Mile at Newmarket. This was the first running of the 2000 Guineas. Also near the front of the betting were Japan at 10/3, Robin at 6/1 and Fair Star at 7/1. Eight runners started the race, which Wizard won from Robin. Fair Star finished third and Japan fourth.

Wizard then went to Epsom Downs for the Derby Stakes, where he was again ridden by Clift, as he had been in his previous two races. He started as the odds-on favourite, priced at about 8/11. Fair Star was the second favourite, with Salivator third in the betting. Salivator took the lead and held it until the field turned into the finishing straight, where Wizard overtook him. Wizard was in front until a few yards from the finish, where he was passed by Pope, a 20/1 outsider. Pope won the race by a neck from Wizard with Salivator in third and Fair Star in fourth. In his last race of the season Wizard finished fourth in the St. Leger Stakes at Doncaster. The race was won by Ashton, who had started as favourite. The St. Leger was the first time Wizard had not been ridden by William Clift, with Francis Buckle riding him.

=== 1810: Four-year-old season ===
Wizard did not reappear as a four-year-old until October, when he defeated Derby winner Pope over 1 1/4 miles at Newmarket. Pope had started the race as the 1/2 favourite. The following day, Wizard walked over for one-third of a subscription of 25 guineas each. These were his only two appearances in 1810.

=== 1811: Five-year-old season ===
Wizard's first race as a five-year-old was a sweepstakes of 100 guineas each on 20 April at Newmarket. He faced three opponents and won the race from odds-on favourite Spaniard. He was then intended to face 1810 Derby winner Whalebone at Newmarket in early May, but Whalebone's owner, the 4th Duke of Grafton, paid a forfeit and the race never took place. He beat Middlethorpe at Newmarket after Middlethorpe unseated his rider in the early stages of the race. The match against Middlethorpe won him 500 guineas. The following day he beat Anthonio over 5 1/2 furlongs. He faced Middlethorpe again in September when he fell lame and Middlethorpe beat him. This was his final race and he was retired to stud. Throughout his racing career Wizard earned 3850 guineas.

== Race record ==
Date	Race name	Distance	Course	Prize	Odds	Runners	Place	Winner/Runner-up	Ref.
3 April 1809	Sweepstakes of 100gs	1 mile 2f	Newmarket	700 gs	6/5	6	1	Chryseis	
18 April 1809	2000 Guineas Stakes	1 mile	Newmarket	1450 gs	4/5	8	1	Robin	
18 May 1809	Derby Stakes	1 mile 4f	Epsom Downs	1050 gs	8/11	10	2	Pope	
25 September 1809	St. Leger Stakes	2 miles	Doncaster	1250 gs	10/1	14	4	Ashton	
1 October 1810	Match against Pope	1 mile 2f	Newmarket	200 gs		2	1	Pope	
2 October 1810	Sweepstakes of 25 gs	2 miles ½f	Newmarket	125 gs	N/A	1	1	Walkover	
20 April 1811	Sweepstakes of 100 gs	1 mile 7 1/2f	Newmarket	450 gs	7/2	4	1	Spaniard	
17 May 1811	Match against Middlethorpe	4 miles 1 1/2f	Newmarket	500 gs		2	1	None	
18 May 1811	Match against Anthonio	5 1/2 furlongs	Newmarket	200 gs	5/6	2	1	Anthonio	
30 September 1811	Match against Middlethorpe	1 mile 7 1/2f	Newmarket	200 gs	4/7	2	2	Middlethorpe	

== Stud career ==
Wizard was a stallion at Elmsal Lodge near Ferrybridge, Yorkshire. In 1812 his stud fee was ten guineas plus half a guinea for the groom. He also stood at Elmsal, for the same fee, in 1813. He only stood as a stallion for these two seasons and died on 30 June 1813 at Elmsal Lodge two days after running into a post. He broke three ribs and an iron bar attached to the post became so lodged in his backbone that it took two men to remove it. Wizard sired three winners of eleven races.

His winning progeny were:

- Wizard filly (1813) – won a maiden race at Penrith in three two-mile heats in 1816. She ran in the Richmond Cup, but was unplaced.
- Warlock (1814) – won two races at Chesterfield and two races at Pontefract in 1817. He also won a race of four three-mile heats at Durham in 1818.
- Young Wizard (1814) – owned by the 3rd Baron Foley and later the 2nd Marquess of Exeter. As a three-year-old in 1817 he won the Riddlesworth Stakes at Newmarket and a Produce Sweepstakes at Doncaster. A match between Young Wizard and Pickaxe at Newmarket finished in a dead heat. He also finished second to Azor in the Derby. In 1818 he beat Sir Thomas in a match race and won a race at Ascot Heath in 1819.

Wizard's descendants include 1963 Irish 2000 Guineas and 1964 Queen Elizabeth II Stakes winner Linacre and 1940 Gran Premio di Milano winner Sirte. Through 1948 Prix Edmond Blanc winner Menetrier he is an ancestor of multiple time Canadian Champion sire and Hall of Fame inductee Vice Regent and his brother Viceregal and their many descendants (which include Deputy Minister, Victory Gallop and Trempolino), as well as Canadian Horse of the Year Canebora and 1979 Prix du Jockey Club winner Top Ville. All these were descended through another unnamed daughter foaled in 1813, as was Hyacinthus, who won the 1940 Middle Park Stakes. This unnamed daughter of Wizard was never trained to race as she was crippled.

Through his 1814 daughter Wizardess his descendants include 1928 Grand Prix de Paris winner Cri de Guerre and his descendants (including 1972 Bay Shore Stakes winner Explodent and 1983 Phoenix Stakes winner King Persian).

== Pedigree ==
Pedigree of Wizard, chestnut stallion, 1806
Sire Sorcerer (GB) bl. 1796	Trumpator (GB) blk. 1782	Conductor ch. 1767	Matchem*
Sire Sorcerer (GB) bl. 1796	Trumpator (GB) blk. 1782	Conductor ch. 1767	Snap mare*
Sire Sorcerer (GB) bl. 1796	Trumpator (GB) blk. 1782	Brunette br. 1771	Squirrel
Sire Sorcerer (GB) bl. 1796	Trumpator (GB) blk. 1782	Brunette br. 1771	Dove
Sire Sorcerer (GB) bl. 1796	Young Giantess (GB) b. 1790	Diomed ch. 1777	Florizel
Sire Sorcerer (GB) bl. 1796	Young Giantess (GB) b. 1790	Diomed ch. 1777	Spectator mare
Sire Sorcerer (GB) bl. 1796	Young Giantess (GB) b. 1790	Giantess b. 1769	Matchem*
Sire Sorcerer (GB) bl. 1796	Young Giantess (GB) b. 1790	Giantess b. 1769	Molly Long Legs
Dam Precipitate mare (GB) 1795	Precipitate (GB) ch. 1787	Mercury ch. 1778	Eclipse
Dam Precipitate mare (GB) 1795	Precipitate (GB) ch. 1787	Mercury ch. 1778	Tartar mare
Dam Precipitate mare (GB) 1795	Precipitate (GB) ch. 1787	Herod mare b. 1779	Herod
Dam Precipitate mare (GB) 1795	Precipitate (GB) ch. 1787	Herod mare b. 1779	Maiden
Dam Precipitate mare (GB) 1795	Lady Harriet (GB) b. 1783	Mark Anthony b. 1767	Spectator
Dam Precipitate mare (GB) 1795	Lady Harriet (GB) b. 1783	Mark Anthony b. 1767	Rachel
Dam Precipitate mare (GB) 1795	Lady Harriet (GB) b. 1783	Georgiana b. 1771	Matchem*
Dam Precipitate mare (GB) 1795	Lady Harriet (GB) b. 1783	Georgiana b. 1771	Snap mare*

Note: b. = Bay, bl. = Black, br. = Brown, ch. = Chestnut

* Wizard is inbred 4S × 4S x 4D to the stallion Matchem, meaning that he appears fourth generation twice on the sire side of his pedigree and fourth generation once on the dam side of his pedigree.

* Wizard is inbred 4S × 4D to the mare Snap mare, meaning that he appears fourth generation once on the sire side of his pedigree and fourth generation once on the dam side of his pedigree.
