= Jorrocks (horse) =

Australian-bred Anglo-Arabian racehorse

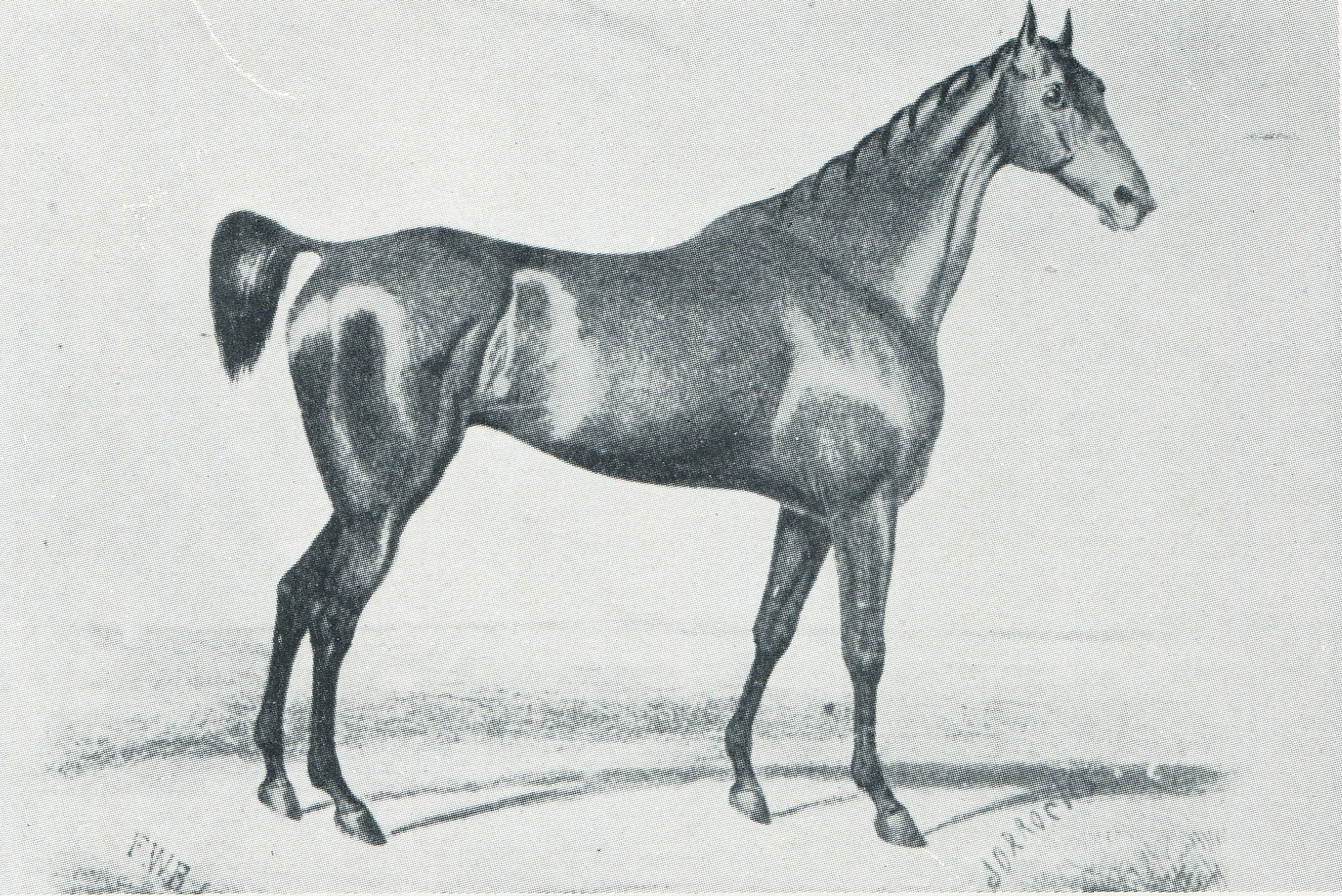
- Sire: Whisker (GB)
- Grandsire: Whisker
- Dam: Matilda
- Damsire: Steeltrap (GB)
- Sex: Gelding
- Foaled: 1833
- Country: Australia
- Colour: Bay
- Breeder: Henry Bayly
- Owner: John Richard Rouse, Sr. A. Thompson
- Trainer: Joseph? "Old" Brown, John Higgerson
- Record: at least 95 starts, 65 wins (including 6 walkovers), 22 seconds
- Earnings: 4,000 sovereigns plus sweepstakes

Honours
- Leading stake winner in NSW eight times
- Last updated on 31 May 2010

Jorrocks, also known as The Iron Gelding, was a hardy, celebrated Australian-bred Anglo-Arabian racehorse that won 30 of his 31 starts in 1846, carrying no less than 9 stone (57 kg) over the usual distances of two (3,200 metres) or three miles (4,800 m). Jorrocks was leading stake winner in New South Wales eight times.

== Breeding ==
He was a bay gelding bred by Henry Bayly at Bayly Park stud in New South Wales. Jorrocks was described as being long, but only 14'2 hands high, with a good head, sloping shoulders, deep girth and short back, with muscular quarters and clean legs. He was by the good racehorse, Whisker (GB) (by Whisker, winner of the 1815 Epsom Derby) who combined stud duties with his racing. Jorrocks’ dam was Matilda, a winner at Sydney meetings the previous year, by Steeltrap (GB) her dam Vesta was by Model (an Arabian) from Cariboo by (Old) Hector (an imported Arabian) from a mare (c.1803) by Rockingham (imp. 1799). Jorrocks was from the colonial, C15 family and a brother to Rowton (c.1835) and a half-brother to Norna (third dam of two Brisbane Cup winners), Vesta and the Mentor mare (c.1840, who established a good winning family).

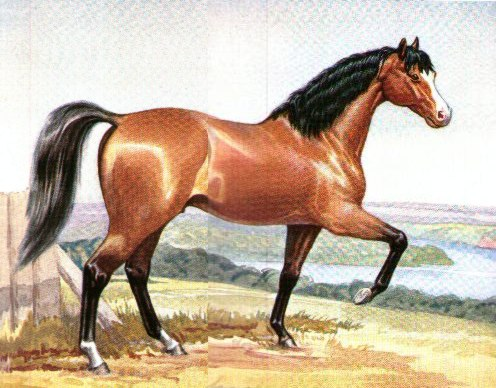
The imported Arabian stallion (Old) Hector, is found in the pedigree of Jorrocks.

== Racing record ==
Jorrocks was not broken in until he was approximately four years old and was then used as a stock-horse in the Barwon River region. He had several owners, but John Higgerson was his longest trainer and often also his jockey. Jorrocks first started as a five-year-old in 1838 in sweepstakes event of 25 sovereigns at the Coolah, New South Wales meeting, which he duly won by a good margin.

He did not race again before he was taken to Windsor in 1840, to be trained by "Old Brown" (possibly Joseph Brown). Here he was bartered to Richard Rouse Sr. in exchange for "eight springing heifers" worth about £40.

Jorrocks first race in good company was in March 1841, under the name of Jollox, at the old Homebush course where he ran a good second to Chestnut Prince in the Ladies' Purse of three miles open to all horses carrying 11 stone (70 kg). He next started under the name of Jollop in the Bathurst Town Plate in which he was defeated. On the next day, he won the next Bathurst Town Plate, and followed this later in the afternoon with a second in the Ladies' Purse. He was then rising eight years old.

In 1843 Jorrocks won the Australian Jockey Club (AJC) Metropolitan Stakes and Cumberland Plate at Homebush, and at the following spring meeting, he won the Champion Cup. He carried nine stone nine pounds (4.1 kg), and ran the three miles in 5.60.

He won 30 of his 31 starts in 1846, carrying no less than nine stone (57 kg) over the usual distances of two or three miles, to be victorious at every start except when he was defeated by Emerald in the Maitland Town Plate. In 1850 he started nine times for four wins and five placings.

One of his most valuable victories was the Cumberland Cup (twice) at Homebush for 100 sovereigns plus sweepstakes. His other wins included the Homebush Champagne Stakes, AJC Australian Plate (four or five times), Homebush Champion Cup, Metropolitan Stakes (three times), Cumberland Cup (twice), Cumberland Stakes, All-Aged Stakes (twice), Parramatta Town Plate (five times), Union Purse, Hawkesbury Members' Purse (twice), Hawkesbury Town Plate (twice), Hawkesbury Ladies Purse (twice) and Turf Club Purse, Publicans' Purse, Hawkesbury Richmond Purse, Metropolitan Stakes (twice), Maitland Purse, Windsor Members' Purse, Bathurst Town Plate (three or four times), Bathurst Publicans' Purse (two or three times), Hunter River Stakes, the Town Plates and minor races at Berrima, Carcoar, Mudgee, Patrick Plains, Penrith and Wellington.

At 17 years of age, Jorrocks won four of his eight race starts and placed second three times. When he was 18, he won once again when the only other starter dislodged his rider and was disqualified, following this he ran last (second and third) in two of his three other races.

Jorrocks’ last win was in the Bathurst Publicans' Purse on the last day of February 1851, defeating Little John, who had beaten him in the Town Plate two days previously. He then had third place to Cossack and Muleyson in the Homebush Australian Plate in May 1851.

At least in March 1851, Jorrocks was owned by Dr. Thomas Revel Johnson in Sofala. ".. He daily exhibits his indomitable spirit and capricious temper before the residents of Sofala, making as light of Dr. Johnson as of a feather-weight .." and ".. carrying Mr W P Bowles about in Sydney, as Jorrocks did the weight of Dr [Thomas] Revel Johnson at Sofala in 1851.".

He was raffled several times and became the property of Mr A. Thompson, who started him in October 1852, at age 19, in the Metropolitan Handicap at Homebush, but here Jorrocks trailed the field home.

Jorrocks had several unidentified owners and his complete racing record is unknown. He had sixty five recorded wins, including six walkovers, and twenty-two seconds from at least 95 starts. Most of his races were usually of two or three miles and run in heats, carrying heavy weights. He was leading stake winner in New South Wales eight times. Jorrocks was enormously popular, the subject of poems and was a legend in his own time.

Jorrocks was finally retired to Clifton Stud, Richmond, New South Wales and died there in August, 1860 at the age of 27.

In 1965, Jorrocks' grave was marked by a memorial stone at the R.A.A.F. Richmond Air Base, which was formerly part of the Clift Stud.

== See also ==
- List of leading Thoroughbred racehorses
- Thoroughbred racing in Australia
