= Pope (horse) =

British Thoroughbred racehorse

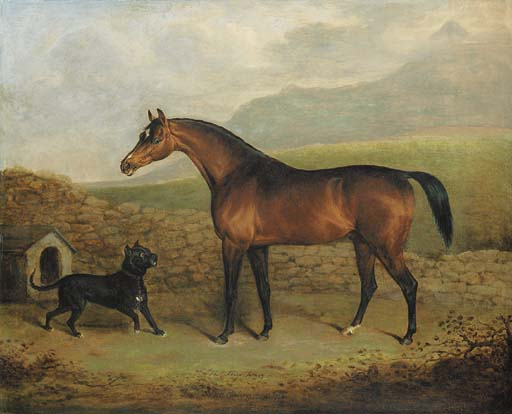
- Pope, painted in 1824 by Henry Bernard Chalon when he was standing in Ireland under the name "The Sligo Waxy."
- Sire: Waxy
- Grandsire: Potoooooooo
- Dam: Prunella
- Damsire: Highflyer
- Sex: Stallion
- Foaled: 1806
- Country: United Kingdom of Great Britain and Ireland
- Colour: Bay
- Breeder: Duke of Grafton
- Owner: 3rd Duke of Grafton
- Record: 16 wins

Major wins
- Epsom Derby (1809)

Pope (1806 – 29 August 1831), also known as Waxy Pope and The Sligo Waxy, was a Thoroughbred racehorse that won the 1809 Epsom Derby and was a leading sire in Ireland. Pope was the first Epsom Derby winner produced by his sire Waxy, who would go on to sire three more Derby winners and three winners of The Oaks. Pope was a half-brother to the prolific broodmare Penelope, the dam of the influential stallions Whisker and Whalebone , who were also sired by Waxy. Pope died on 29 August 1831 at Clearwell.

== Background ==
Pope was bred by the Duke of Grafton and was foaled at his Euston Hall stud in 1806. Pope was sired by the 1790 Epsom Derby winner Waxy, who was purchased by the Duke and became an influential and important sire that went on to sire three additional Derby winners and three winners of The Oaks. Pope's dam, Prunella, was bred by the Duke of Grafton and was sired by Highflyer out of the mare Promise, sired by Snap.

Prunella produced 12 foals for the Duke of Grafton between 1796 and her death in December 1811. Pope was her seventh foal and the first of four foals sired by Waxy. Full-siblings to Pope include the mares Pledge (the dam of the 1819 Derby winner Tiresias), Pope Joan (the dam of the 1827 2,000 Guineas winner Turcoman and 1828 Oaks winner Turquoise) and Prudence (the dam of Reginald and Rowena). Half-siblings to Pope include the mares Pelisse (winner of the Oaks), Penelope (the dam of 1810 and 1815 Derby winners Whalebone and Whisker, who were also sired by Waxy), Parasol (the dam of Pastille and Pindarrie) and the good racer Pioneer.

== Racing career ==
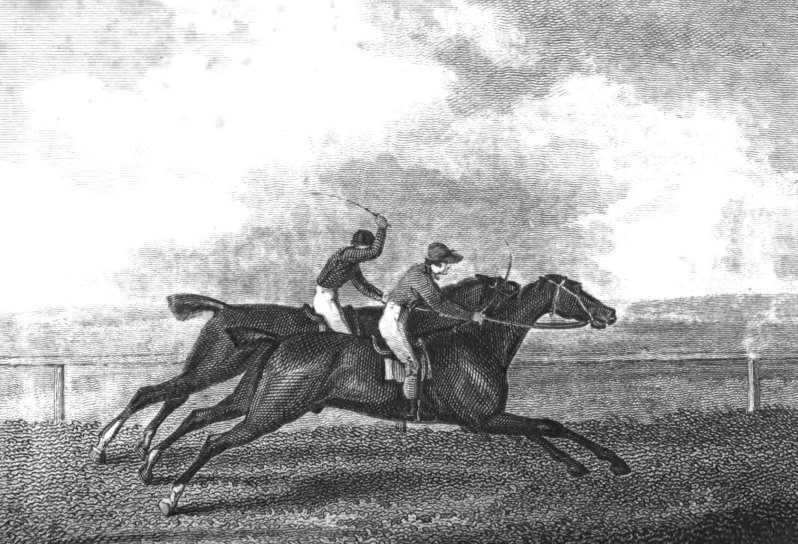
Pope (foreground) and Wizard running in the 1809 Derby in a contemporary engraving based on a painting by John Nott Sartorius.

Pope did not run as a two-year-old. Another colt named Pope, sired by Shuttle and owned by a Mr. Barlow, raced at the same time as Pope, but he was a year younger than the Duke of Grafton's Pope. Pope was sold to Lord Sligo after the 1811 racing season and was relocated to Ireland where he raced until 1813.

=== 1809: three-year-old season ===
On 18 May, Pope ran in the Derby Stakes against nine other horses. At the start, the Duke of Rutland's colt Salvator "took the lead" and was the frontrunner until Tattenham Corner when Mr. Wilson's chestnut colt Wizard took the lead. Wizard held his position until "within a few strides of the winning-post" when Pope's jockey Tom Goodisson "made one serve for all" and took the win from Wizard "by a neck." One commenter for Sporting Magazine thought that Goodisson "rode his horse with great skill and judgement" and "gave great satisfaction to all present." Wizard finished second and Salvator was third. Charles Bunbury's colt Fair Star (a full-brother to Eleanor) finished fourth. Goodisson reportedly only made one bet for the race, for his mount Pope to win against 8 to 1 odds. An engraving of the finish (right) was commissioned by Sporting Magazine from a painting by sporting artist John Nott Sartorius.

On 7 June at Ascot, Pope walked over for a 200-guinea sweepstakes race. In October at Newmarket, Pope won the Lilly-Hoo Stakes while carrying five more pounds in the race than the other three horses as a handicap for his Derby Win. The next day at the same meeting, Pope walked over for a 140-guinea Subscription race. On 16 October, Pope received 75 guineas forfeiture from Mr. Shakespeare's horse Nuncio. Pope won 500-guinea Garden Stakes at the Houghton meeting on 30 October, beating the 6-year-old horse Cassio and the filly Mirth. Pope received 100 guineas forfeiture from Mr. Craven after his filly Black Diamond backed out of a match race.

=== 1810: four-year-old season ===
On 23 April at the Craven meeting, Pope received 50 guineas from Lord Jersey's colt Robin, and Pope beat Lord Darlington's colt Levant in a match race. The following day, Pope finished fourth in the second class of the Oatlands Stakes, which was won by Lord Oxford's mare Victoria. On 21 May at Newmarket, Pope beat Mr. Shakespeare's colt Harpocrates in a 200-guinea match race. On 1 October during the Newmarket First October meeting, Pope lost a match race with his former Derby rival Wizard. At the Second October Newmarket meeting, Pope won a 600-guinea sweepstakes race against Lord Foley's colt Spaniard and Mr. Lake's filly Britannia and received 60 guineas forfeiture from Lord Darlington when his horse Musician backed out of a match race. In his last start of the season, Pope was unplaced in the Tortoise Stakes won by Mr. Shakespeare's horse Tumbler.

=== 1811: five-year-old season ===
At the First Spring meeting at Newmarket, Pope finished second and last in a £50 subscription stakes and the following day won a £50 subscription stakes. Later at the same meeting, Pope finished third (but not officially placed) in £50 subscription handicap plate, losing to the colt Cambric and the horse Salvator. In October in Newmarket, Pope won a subscription race against Burleigh and Salvator. and a few weeks later walked over in a subscription race for six-year-olds and forfeited the Oatlands Stakes. At the Houghton Meeting in October, Pope finished second in the Garden Stakes to the three-year-old colt Truffle, received a forfeit from Mr. Andrew's mare Morel and finished second in a 100-guinea sweepstakes race.

=== 1812: six-year-old season ===
Pope was bought in 1812 for 1,000 guineas by Lord Lonsdale for the Marquess of Sligo and was relocated to Ireland for use as a racehorse. Lord Lonsdale wrote to the Marquess that "he [had] sent him the best bred horse in the world save one," with the exception being Swordsman. The other Pope (sired by Shuttle) was sold to a Mr. Browne and was also relocated to Ireland. Pope (renamed Waxy) debuted at the Curragh Meeting on 7 September in a 200-guinea sweepstakes race, finishing second to Pope by Shuttle. At the Curragh on 12 October, Pope finished second in the Kirwan Stakes to the three-year-old colt Lennox. Pope by Shuttle also ran, but was unplaced, in the race. Throughout his career Pope won a total of sixteen races.

== Stud career ==
Pope was retained by Lord Sligo after his racing career as a breeding stallion. Pope stood under the name "Waxy Pope" to distinguish him from another horse named Pope (sired by Shuttle) that was also standing in Ireland. In 1821, Pope stood in Oxcroft, England for a 10 guinea stud fee.

== Sire line tree ==
- Waxy Pope
  - The Dandy
  - Prendergast
  - Starch
    - Zimmerman
  - Canteen
  - Sligo
  - Trumpeter
  - Mount Eagle
  - Skylark
  - The Cardinal

== Pedigree ==
Pedigree of Pope (GB), Bay colt, 1806
Sire Waxy (GB) Bay, 1790	Potoooooooo; 1773	Eclipse	Marske
Sire Waxy (GB) Bay, 1790	Potoooooooo; 1773	Eclipse	Spilletta
Sire Waxy (GB) Bay, 1790	Potoooooooo; 1773	Sportsmistress	Sportsman
Sire Waxy (GB) Bay, 1790	Potoooooooo; 1773	Sportsmistress	Golden Locks
Sire Waxy (GB) Bay, 1790	Maria; 1777	Herod*	Tartar*
Sire Waxy (GB) Bay, 1790	Maria; 1777	Herod*	Cypron*
Sire Waxy (GB) Bay, 1790	Maria; 1777	Lisette	Snap*
Sire Waxy (GB) Bay, 1790	Maria; 1777	Lisette	Miss Windsor
Dam Prunella (GB) Bay, 1788	Highflyer; 1774	Herod*	Tartar*
Dam Prunella (GB) Bay, 1788	Highflyer; 1774	Herod*	Cypron*
Dam Prunella (GB) Bay, 1788	Highflyer; 1774	Rachel	Blank*
Dam Prunella (GB) Bay, 1788	Highflyer; 1774	Rachel	Regulus Mare
Dam Prunella (GB) Bay, 1788	Promise; 1768	Snap*	Snip*
Dam Prunella (GB) Bay, 1788	Promise; 1768	Snap*	Fox Mare*
Dam Prunella (GB) Bay, 1788	Promise; 1768	Julia	Blank*
Dam Prunella (GB) Bay, 1788	Promise; 1768	Julia	Partner Mare

* Pope is inbred 3S x 3D to the stallion Herod, meaning that he appears third generation on the sire side of his pedigree, and third generation on the dam side of his pedigree.

* Pope is inbred 4S x 3D to the stallion Snap, meaning that he appears fourth generation on the sire side of his pedigree, and third generation on the dam side of his pedigree.

* Pope is inbred 4D x 4D to the stallion Blank, meaning that he appears fourth generation twice on the dam side of his pedigree.
