= Robert Robson (horse trainer) =

British horse trainer (c. 1765–1838)

Robert Robson (c.1765–1838) was a horse trainer, known as the Emperor of Trainers who ran "the outstandingly successful stable of the first quarter of the 19th century."The leading racehorse trainer of his time, he raised their status from glorified groom to professional.

He was based initially at Lewes where he was private trainer to Sir Ferdinand Poole from 1793. In that year he won his first Derby with Waxy. He then spent rest of his career at Newmarket and trained six more Derby winners - Tyrant, Pope and Whalebone for the 3rd Duke of Grafton, Whisker for the 4th Duke of Grafton, Mr Payne's Azor and Mr Udney's Emilius.

Accordingly, he jointly holds the record for training winners of The Derby. His horses won the race seven times; only two other trainers have achieved this. As for other successes, his horses won the 2,000 Guineas Stakes six times, the 1000 Guineas Stakes nine times between 1818 and 1827 and he saddled thirteen winners of The Oaks. To his contemporaries he was known as "the Emperor of Trainers" and his horses benefited from a gentler regime from that then practised by most stables.

He continued to live in Newmarket after his retirement in 1828, when, as a testimonial, members of the Jockey Club presented him with a piece of plate. He was said to be worth £60,000 at his death.

== Bibliography ==
- Tanner, Michael; Cranham, Gerry (1992). Great Jockeys of the Flat. Enfield, Middlesex: Guinness Publishing. ISBN 0-85112-989-7.
- Mortimer, Roger; Onslow, Richard; Willett, Peter (1978). Biographical Encyclopaedia of British Racing. London: Macdonald and Jane's. ISBN 0-354-08536-0.
