= Whisker (horse) =

British Thoroughbred racehorse

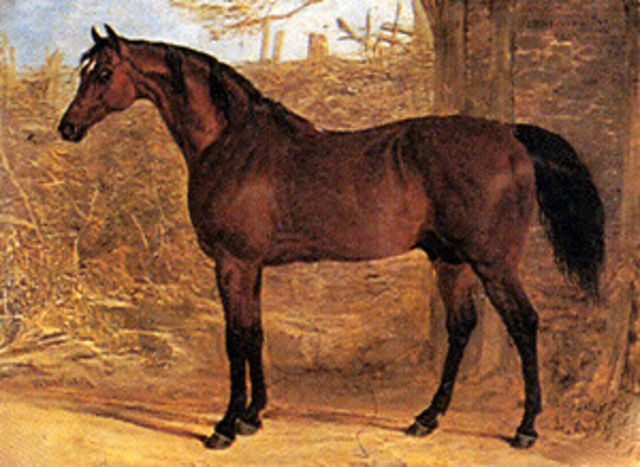
- Whisker by John Frederick Herring, Sr., c. 1820.
- Sire: Waxy
- Grandsire: Potoooooooo
- Dam: Penelope
- Damsire: Trumpator
- Sex: Stallion
- Foaled: 1812
- Country: United Kingdom of Great Britain and Ireland
- Colour: Bay
- Breeder: Duke of Grafton
- Owner: 1) Duke of Grafton; 2) Lord Darlington
- Trainer: Robert Robson
- Record: 20: 9-4-2

Major wins
- Epsom Derby (1815); Port Stakes (1816)

Whisker (1812 – 11 March 1832) was a Thoroughbred racehorse that won the 1815 Epsom Derby and was a full-brother of the 1810 winner Whalebone. Whisker raced until he was a six-year-old, but did not race in 1817. Whisker was retired to stud in 1819, where he became a successful and influential sire. The offspring of Whisker and Whalebone continued the sire-line of Eclipse into the 20th century.

== Background ==
Whisker was bred by the Duke of Grafton and was foaled in 1812 at his Euston Hall stud farm near Newmarket. Whisker was sired by the 1793 Epsom Derby winner Waxy out of the mare Penelope (foaled in 1798), both owned by the Duke. As a racehorse, Penelope was a contemporary of the 1801 Derby-winning filly Eleanor, beating her several times, and was half-sister to 1809 Derby winner Pope and the mares Pope Joan (both sired by Waxy), Parasol (Partisan's dam) and Prudence. Penelope was a prolific and influential broodmare, producing eight full-siblings to Whisker that achieved success on the turf. She produced 13 foals between 1806 and 1823, all with names beginning with the letter W. Whisker was her seventh foal and his full-siblings include Whalebone (the 1810 Derby winner), Web, Woful, Wilful, Wire, Wildfire and Windfall. Penelope died in 1824.

The racing commentator "The Druid" described Whisker's physique "as near perfection as a horse could be" and his only fault was that he was "a little calf-kneed" but was "equally likely to get a racer, hunter, machiner or a hack." Whisker has been lauded as the "handsomest" of Waxy's offspring and his appearance was described more favorably than his brother Whalebone, who was short and had a "Turkish pony-look." All of Waxy's offspring reportedly inherited "short legs, high-bred nostrils and very prominent eyes" with Whisker inheriting his sire's "beautiful quarters."

== Racing career ==
Whisker was trained by Robert Robson at his facility in Newmarket. Robson trained seven Derby winners over his 30-year career, including Whisker's brother Whalebone and his sire Waxy. Whisker did not race as a two-year-old. Whisker won nine races over his three-year racing career. Whisker did not race in 1817, returning to the turf in the spring of 1818, and was retired to stud at the end of the 1818 racing season.

=== 1815: three-year-old season ===
At the Craven Meeting in April, Whisker received forfeitures from the Duke of Rutland's unnamed filly sired by Selim (who had died) and from Lord Darlington's unnamed colt sired by Selim, and a few days later received a 50-guinea forfeiture from an unnamed colt sired by Orville (later named Dinmont). At the First Spring Meeting at Newmarket, Whisker was unplaced in the 2,000 Guineas Stakes, which was won by the colt Tigris. The next day, Whisker finished second in the Newmarket Stakes to Lord Lowther's colt Busto.

On 25 May at Epsom, Whisker started in the Derby Stakes against twelve other horses. At the start of the race, General Gower's colt Busto "made severe play," taking the lead after Tattenham Corner and remaining the frontrunner until "within two-hundred yards of the Ending-Post" when he was overtaken by his stablemate Raphael. Raphael maintained the lead in the stretch until "the last two or three strides" when Whisker (ridden by Tom Goodisson) "came up and won by about half a head." The finish was a close contest between the three frontrunners with the other ten contenders "beat a long way." Raphael finished in second place with Busto crossing the finish third but not officially placed. Raphael's jockey, Jackson, who was said to have ridden with "masterly style" was "thrown off" Raphael soon after crossing the finish line. The Sporting Magazine asserted that the running "had given satisfaction to all experienced judges on the Turf."

At the October Meeting at Newmarket, Whisker was unplaced in the St. Leger Stakes which was won by Mr. Payne's colt Quinola. On 16 October, Whisker won 200 guineas after he defeated the colt Equator in a mile-long match race held at Newmarket. Whisker withdrew from the Oatlands Stakes held a few days later, paying 10 guineas forfeit. At the same meeting, Whisker beat Mr. Shakespear's colt Donkey in a match race at 10 to 1 odds, but he lost a match race to Mr. Neville's colt Sir Joshua a few days later.

=== 1816: four-year-old season ===
At the Craven Meeting in April, Whisker won the 100-guinea Port Stakes, beating the colt Equator. At Newmarket on 29 April, Whisker beat Lord Darlington's colt Paulus in a mile-long match race, winning 200 guineas. In May at Newmarket, Whisker beat the colt Sir Joshua in a 300-guinea match race. Whisker finished fourth in a 200-guinea sweepstakes race, losing to the horse Bourbon and the colts Sir Thomas and Quinola. On 14 October, Whisker received 70 guineas from Lord Darlington after his horse Paulus backed out of a match race. Whisker was sold to Lord Darlington at Newmarket. A few weeks later running in Lord Darlington's name, Whisker was beaten in a match race by his former rival Equator at the Houghton Meeting. A few days later, Whisker won the Handicap Sweepstakes, beating the filly Duenna and the colts Fandango and Equator.

=== 1818: six-year-old season ===
Whisker did not run in 1817 and made his first appearance on 13 April 1818 at the Craven Meeting (still listed as a five-year-old) in the Craven Stakes, for which he ran unplaced in a 22 horse field. At Newmarket, Whisker was third in the Fifty Pound subscription stakes, losing to the four-year-old colt Skim and the horse Fugitive. A few days later, Whisker beat Lord Cavendish's colt Little Dick in a 200-guinea match race. Whisker received 200 guineas forfeiture from the horse Cannonball on 11 May at Newmarket. The next day, Whisker finished third in a handicap race, losing to the colt Merrymaker and the filly Leopoldine (the full-sister to 1816 Derby winner Prince Leopold). At the same meeting, Whisker beat Mr. Prince's colt Manfred in a match race and a few hours later finished fifth (unplaced) in a 50-guinea Cup race won by The Flyer. In his last career start, Whisker was beaten in a match race by the colt The Student at the October Newmarket meeting. Whisker was retired to stud at the end of the racing season.

== Stud career ==
Whisker was retired to stud for the 1819 breeding season, first standing at Morton near Northallerton for 15 guineas per mare. Whisker died on 11 March 1832 at the age of 20 years after "covering a few mares that season."

Whisker sired two St. Leger Stakes winners, Memnon and The Colonel. Whisker was a good broodmare sire. Whisker sired 123 winners, with career earnings of just over £45,961.

Foaled	Name	Sex	Major Wins/Achievements
1822	Memnon	Stallion	St Leger Stakes
1825	The Colonel	Stallion	St Leger Stakes
	Catherina	Mare	Started in 171 races. Won 75 races.
	Economist	Stallion	Grandsire of King Tom.
	Emma	Mare	Dam of Mundig, Cotherstone, Trustee, Mowerina (dam of West Australian)

== Sire line tree ==
- Whisker
  - Abron
  - Caccia Patti
  - Mustachio
  - Swiss
  - Catterick
    - Jerry
  - Memnon
    - King Cole
    - Czudo
    - Sygnal
  - Coulon
  - Economist
    - The General
    - Normanby
    - Harkaway
      - The Connaught Ranger
      - Finvaragh
      - Ballinafad
      - Cappard
      - Earth Stopper
      - Harkover
      - Horn Of Chase
      - Lanesborough
      - Peep O'Day Boy
      - Tally Ho
      - The Heath
      - Blucher
      - Idle Boy
        - Pretty Boy
        - The Monk
        - Ceylon
          - Recruit
      - Sobraon
      - Elcho
      - Irelands Eye
      - The Hunting Horn
      - King Tom
        - King Of Diamonds
        - Janus
        - Prince Plausible
        - Old Calabar
        - Wingrave
        - Mogador
        - King Of The Vale
        - King Charming
        - Dalesman
        - Janitor
        - Lothario
        - Tomahawk
        - Tom King
        - King Alfred
        - Phaeton
        - Restitution
        - King Cole
        - King O'Scots
        - Kingcraft
        - Ethelred
        - King Ernest
        - King Lud
        - Marsworth
        - Peeping Tom
        - Coltness
        - Great Tom
        - Skylark
        - Wild Tommy
        - King Ban
      - Wild Huntsman
      - Cheerful Horn
        - Cortolvin
    - Economy
    - Doctor Sangado
    - Mulligatawney
    - Condor
    - Lord George
    - Flying Buck
  - The Colonel
    - D'Egville
    - Cap-a-Pie
      - Sir Hercules
        - Yattendon
        - The Barb
        - Barbarian
    - Chatham
      - Sittingborne
      - Student
  - Emancipation
  - Lawrie Todd
  - Perion
  - Whisker
    - Jorrocks

== Pedigree ==
Pedigree of Whisker (GB), Bay colt, 1812
Sire Waxy (GB) Bay, 1790	Potoooooooo; 1773	Eclipse	Marske
Sire Waxy (GB) Bay, 1790	Potoooooooo; 1773	Eclipse	Spilletta
Sire Waxy (GB) Bay, 1790	Potoooooooo; 1773	Sportsmistress	Sportsman
Sire Waxy (GB) Bay, 1790	Potoooooooo; 1773	Sportsmistress	Golden Locks
Sire Waxy (GB) Bay, 1790	Maria; 1777	Herod*	Tartar*
Sire Waxy (GB) Bay, 1790	Maria; 1777	Herod*	Cypron*
Sire Waxy (GB) Bay, 1790	Maria; 1777	Lisette	Snap*
Sire Waxy (GB) Bay, 1790	Maria; 1777	Lisette	Miss Windsor
Dam Penelope (GB) Bay, 1798	Trumpator; 1782	Conductor	Matchem
Dam Penelope (GB) Bay, 1798	Trumpator; 1782	Conductor	Snap Mare*
Dam Penelope (GB) Bay, 1798	Trumpator; 1782	Brunette	Squirrel
Dam Penelope (GB) Bay, 1798	Trumpator; 1782	Brunette	Dove
Dam Penelope (GB) Bay, 1798	Prunella; 1788	Highflyer	Herod*
Dam Penelope (GB) Bay, 1798	Prunella; 1788	Highflyer	Rachel
Dam Penelope (GB) Bay, 1798	Prunella; 1788	Promise	Snap*
Dam Penelope (GB) Bay, 1798	Prunella; 1788	Promise	Julia

* Whisker is inbred 3S x 4D to the stallion Herod, meaning that he appears third generation on the sire side of his pedigree, and fourth generation on the dam side of his pedigree.

* Whisker is inbred 4S x 5D x 4D to the stallion Snap, meaning that he appears fourth generation on the sire side of his pedigree, and fifth generation (via Snap mare) and fourth generation on the dam side of his pedigree.
