= Benjamin Marshall (painter) =

English painter (1768–1835)

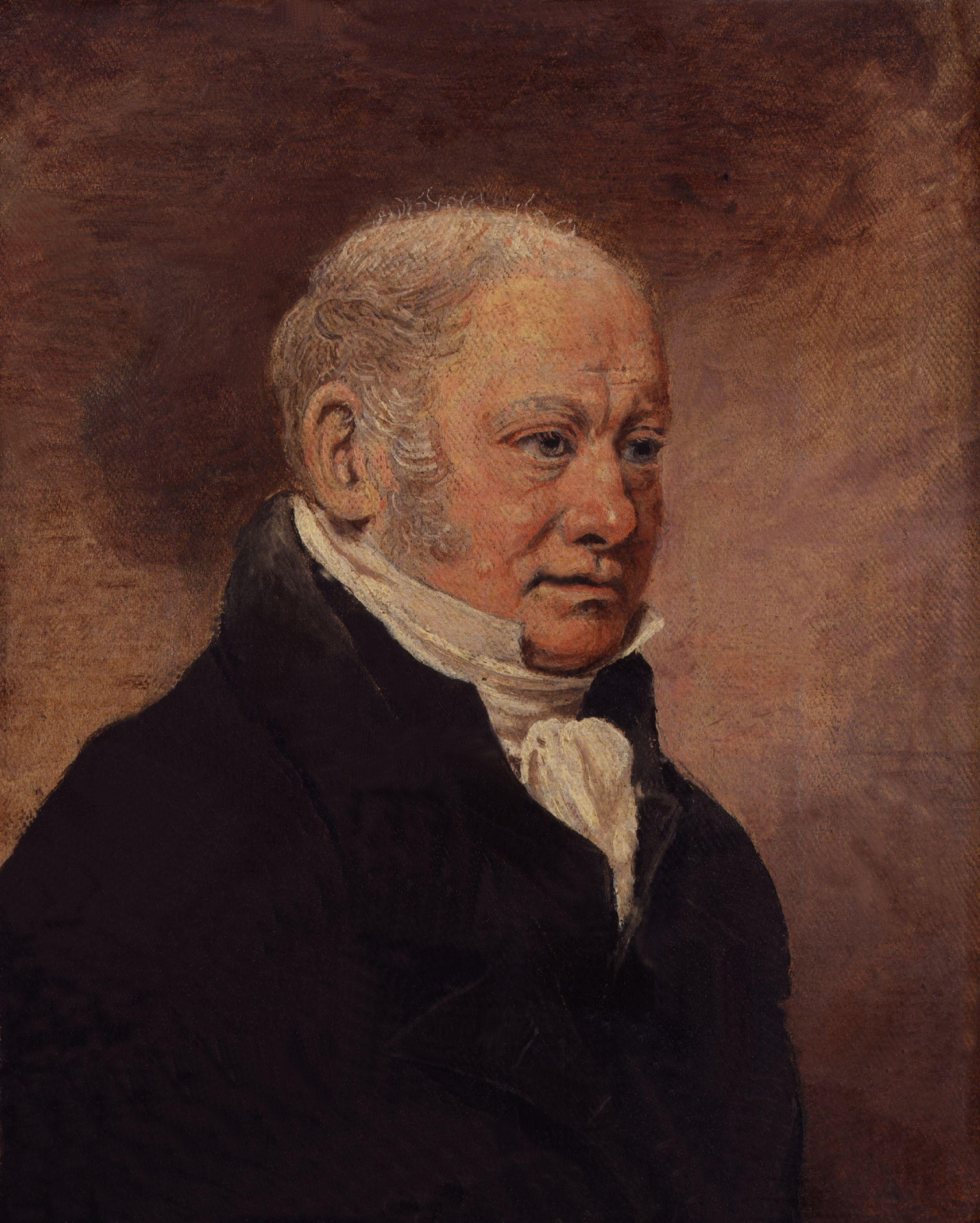
- Portrait of Benjamin Marshall by his son Lambert Marshall, c. 1825
- Born: 8 November 1768; Seagrave, England, Kingdom of Great Britain
- Died: 29 January 1835 (aged 66); London, England, UK
- Education: Lemuel Francis Abbott
- Known for: Animal painting

Benjamin Marshall (8 November 1768 – 29 January 1835) was an English sporting and animal painter. He was a follower of George Stubbs and studied under Lemuel Abbott for three years.

== Life ==
He was born in Seagrave, Leicestershire to Charles and Elizabeth Marshall. He initially focused on portrait painting, until at the age of 26 he began to concentrate on horses. He exhibited thirteen pictures, chiefly portraits of racehorses and their owners, at the Royal Academy, 1801–1812 and 1818–19.

His portraits of sporting characters included those of J. G. Shaddick, 1806, and Daniel Lambert, 1807. Two pictures of fighting cocks, exhibited in 1812, were engraved in mezzotint by Charles Turner in the same year with the titles of The Cock in Feather and The Trimm'd Cock. Other engraved pictures are Hap-hazard and Muly Moloch, racehorses belonging to the Earl of Darlington, engraved as a pair by W. and G. Cooke, 1805, from pictures at Raby Castle; The Earl of Darlington and his Foxhounds, by T. Dean, 1805, and the companion subject, Francis Dukinfield Astley and his Harriers, by R. Woodman, 1809; Sir Teddy, mezzotint by Charles Turner, 1808; Sancho, a pointer belonging to Sir John Shelley, etched by Charles Turner in 1808; and Diamond, a racehorse, engraved in mezzotint by W. Barnard in 1811.

Benjamin Marshall

Sixty paintings of sportsmen, horses, and dogs by Marshall were engraved by John Scott for Wheble's Sporting Magazine, vols. vii-lxxxi., and eight types of horses by Marshall, also engraved by Scott, appeared in The Sportsman's Repository, 1820. Marshall's exhibited and engraved works represent but a small proportion of the commissions which he carried out for patrons of the turf and masters of hounds throughout the country. A number of his pictures of horses are in the collection of Sir Walter Gilbey.

About 1800–1810, Marshall was living at 23 Beaumont Street, Marylebone. In 1812 he relocated to Newmarket, and was often described as "Marshall of Newmarket". He was seriously injured in a coach crash in 1819 which prevented him from painting for a year, and left him with permanent disability. He became a regular contributor of letters about horse racing in The Sporting Magazine from 1821 until 1833, writing under the pseudonym 'The Observator'. He died on 29 January 1835.

His son Lambert Marshall (13 November 1809- 25 May 1873) was also a sporting painter but without the success of his father. He was reduced to teaching drawing in Brighton and finally the workhouse there.

J. G. Shaddick, the Celebrated Sportsman

Daniel Lambert

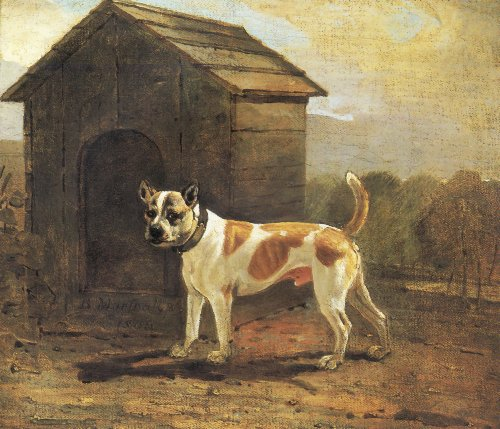
Dustman

The Duke of Richmond's 'Rough Robin' with the Jockey Frank Buckle Up
