= Smolensko (horse) =

British Thoroughbred racehorse

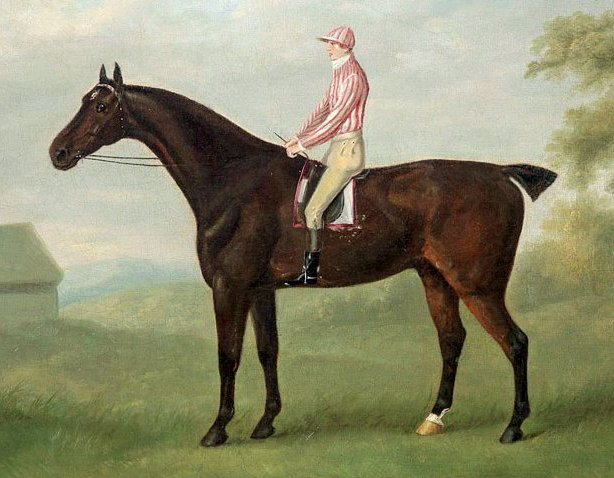
- Smolensko by John Nott Sartorius, c. 1813.
- Sire: Sorcerer
- Grandsire: Trumpator
- Dam: Wowski
- Damsire: Mentor
- Sex: Stallion
- Foaled: 1810
- Country: United Kingdom of Great Britain and Ireland
- Colour: Black
- Breeder: Charles Bunbury
- Owner: 1) Charles Bunbury; 2) Richard Wilson; 3) John Theobald
- Trainer: Crouch
- Record: 8: 7–0–1

Major wins
- Epsom Derby (1813); 2,000 Guineas Stakes (1813)

Smolensko (1810 – 10 January 1829) was a Thoroughbred racehorse that won the 1813 Epsom Derby and 2,000 Guineas Stakes. Smolensko raced for two years and was retired to stud in 1815. He stood for seven years for his breeder, Charles Bunbury, and spent the remainder of his stud career in Surrey and Suffolk. Before his death at age 19 in 1829, he sired the filly Gulnare (winner of the 1827 Epsom Oaks) and the colt Jerry (winner of the 1824 St. Leger Stakes).

== Background ==
Smolensko was foaled in 1810 at Barton Hall near Bury St. Edmunds, the ancestral home of his breeder Charles Bunbury. His sire, Sorcerer, was also bred by Bunbury and was a half-brother of the 1801 Derby winning mare Eleanor. Sorcerer was a large black horse that was a successful racer and sire. Smolensko's dam, Wowski, was bred by Sir Ferdinando Poole, owned by Mr Hallett, and was a half-sister of the important sire Waxy. Another of Wowski's offspring was Smolensko's full-brother Thunderbolt, a successful racer but short-lived sire. Wowski produced thirteen foals between 1802 and 1822. Smolensko was her fifth foal and she produced seven full-brothers to Smolensko who all inherited the black coat of their parents.

Smolensko was a black colt with a coat mixed with a "few white hairs," a small white star and a sock on his right hind foot. He was "about sixteen and a half hands high" and had a calm and docile temperament. A German count visiting Sir Charles in 1818 described him as, "... a brilliant animal with a beautiful high and formed neck and excellent shoulders and withers. His legs on contrary are in proportion to rest of the body rather longer than those of his father and his arms and hocks are not so broad as those of his parent however notwithstanding his considerable performances his legs are perfectly free from all blemishes."

== Racing career ==
Smolensko did not run as a two-year-old. In his two-year racing career, he ran eight times and won seven races, finishing third once and forfeiting a race due to injury. His most important wins were in the 1813 Epsom Derby and 2,000 Guineas Stakes. He ran only twice as a four-year-old before being retired to Bunbury's stud in 1815.

=== 1813: three-year-old season ===
==== Spring ====
On the first start of Smolensko's racing career at the First Spring Meeting at Newmarket, he won the 2,000 Guineas Stakes on 4 May, beating The Oaks winning filly Music and nine other horses. The next day, Smolensko won the Newmarket Stakes from the filly Scheherazade in a ten horse field that included the fillies Music and Wilful (sired by Waxy).

==== Summer ====
On 3 June, Smolensko started in the Derby Stakes held at Epsom against a field of eleven other horses. Before the race, Smolensko was paraded before the assembled crowd and there "was a burst of admiration on all sides" with Sporting Magazine commenting on his "fine eye, the splendid symmetry of his limbs, the grace and power of his action and his perfect docility" before the race. Smolensko bruised the sole of one of his hooves during a training run on the Friday before the Derby and his regular shoes were replaced with solid metal plates for the running. At three o'clock, the race began with Smolensko soon taking the lead, followed closely by Lord Jersey's colt Caterpillar. At Tadnor's Point (Tattenham Corner, a sharp turn in the track) Caterpillar took the lead from Smolensko, but one hundred yards from the finish, Smolensko, under jockey Goodisson's command, "shot past Caterpillar like lightning, winning easily by a length." The excitement of Smolensko's Derby win led to a few accidents in the crowd with commentary in Sporting Magazine reporting that, "Many falls took place, some few persons were run over, and of consequence a few accidents occurred." In the most serious occurrence, "a phaeton was unfortunately overthrown, and a lady who was in it much injured, and a gentleman who endeavoured to prevent the accident, had his arm broken."

At Egham on 25 August, Smolensko won the 175-guinea Magna Charta Stakes from the Duke of York's colt Eurus.

==== Autumn ====
At the First October Meeting at Newmarket, Smolensko finished third in a £96 sweepstakes race to the colts The Corporal and Macedonian. He was injured during the race, straining "one of his back sinews." With Smolensko still recovering from his injury at Newmarket, his connections forfeited an 18 October match race with the colt Benedict, paying 80 guineas to Lord Foley. On 1 November at the Houghton Meeting, Smolensko beat Grosvenor's colt Redmond in a match race.

=== 1814: four-year-old season ===
Smolensko only started twice in 1814. At the Newmarket-Craven meeting on 12 April, Smolensko won a match race against the colt Tiger. At the First Spring Meeting on 29 April at Newmarket, Smolensko won a 450-guinea sweepstakes race against four other horses, beating the colts Pyramus and Punic. Smolensko retired from racing in 1814 and became a breeding stallion for Charles Bunbury the following year.

== Stud career ==
Smolensko was retired to stud in 1815 and stood at Great Barton until 1 March when he was relocated to the Oatlands stud in Surrey where he commanded a 20-guinea stud fee and a 1-guinea groom fee. Charles Bunbury died on 31 March 1821, and upon his death, the landlord (Nathaniel Garland) of one of Bunbury's leased estates claimed 14 horses from Bunbury's stable as a heriot. Smolensko had recently been sent to a stable in Yorkshire and was not present at Barton Hall during the incident. Garland later sued in court for the right to claim and include Smolensko as one of the 14 horses in the heriot. The court ruled that since Smolensko was not initially included in the list, Garland did not have a right to him stating: "in consequence of the bailiff's saying he had enough when he took the list, the horse Smolensko is therefore not included."

Smolensko was bought after Bunbury's death in 1821 by Richard Wilson for approximately 1,300 guineas and was relocated to Bildeston, Suffolk. Wilson sold Smolensko to John Theobald and he was relocated to Stockwell, Surrey where he stood for 10 guineas per mare and a half guinea groom's fee. Smolensko died on 10 January 1829 at the age of 19 years at Mr. Theobald's stud in Stockwell and was buried in the paddock.

Smolensko is not considered to be an extraordinary sire, but he did sire one winner of The Oaks (the filly Gulnare) and one St. Leger Stakes winner (the colt Jerry).

== Sire line tree ==
- Smolensko
  - Jerry
    - Tomboy
      - Nutwith
        - Knight of Kars
      - Trueboy
    - Clearwell
    - Jeremy Diddler
    - Jericho
      - The Promised Land

== Pedigree ==
Pedigree of Smolensko (GB), Black Colt, 1810
Sire Sorcerer (GB) Black, 1796	Trumpator; 1782	Conductor	Matchem*
Sire Sorcerer (GB) Black, 1796	Trumpator; 1782	Conductor	Snap Mare
Sire Sorcerer (GB) Black, 1796	Trumpator; 1782	Brunette	Squirrel
Sire Sorcerer (GB) Black, 1796	Trumpator; 1782	Brunette	Dove
Sire Sorcerer (GB) Black, 1796	Young Giantess; 1790	Diomed	Florizel
Sire Sorcerer (GB) Black, 1796	Young Giantess; 1790	Diomed	Sister to Juno
Sire Sorcerer (GB) Black, 1796	Young Giantess; 1790	Giantess	Matchem*
Sire Sorcerer (GB) Black, 1796	Young Giantess; 1790	Giantess	Molly Longlegs
Dam Wowski (GB) Black, 1797	Mentor; 1784	Justice	Herod*
Dam Wowski (GB) Black, 1797	Mentor; 1784	Justice	Curiosity
Dam Wowski (GB) Black, 1797	Mentor; 1784	Shakespeare Mare	Shakespeare
Dam Wowski (GB) Black, 1797	Mentor; 1784	Shakespeare Mare	Miss Meredith
Dam Wowski (GB) Black, 1797	Maria; 1777	Herod*	Tartar
Dam Wowski (GB) Black, 1797	Maria; 1777	Herod*	Cypron
Dam Wowski (GB) Black, 1797	Maria; 1777	Lisette	Snap
Dam Wowski (GB) Black, 1797	Maria; 1777	Lisette	Miss Windsor

* Smolensko is inbred 4D × 3D to the stallion Herod, meaning that he appears fourth generation on the sire side of his pedigree and third generation on the dam side of his pedigree.

* Smolensko is inbred 4S × 4S to the stallion Matchem, meaning that he appears twice fourth generation on the sire side of his pedigree.
