= Don John (horse) =

British-bred Thoroughbred racehorse

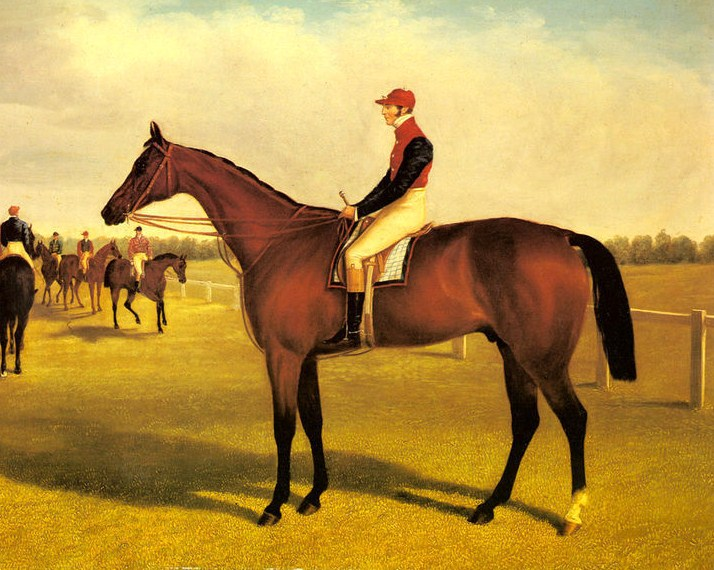
- Don John, The Winner of the 1838 St. Leger with William Scott Up by John Frederick Herring
- Sire: Waverley
- Grandsire: Whalebone
- Dam: Comus mare
- Damsire: Comus
- Sex: Stallion
- Foaled: 1835
- Country: United Kingdom
- Colour: Bay
- Breeder: William Garforth or George Stanhope, 6th Earl of Chesterfield
- Owner: George Stanhope, 6th Earl of Chesterfield
- Trainer: John Scott
- Record: 10: 9-1-0

Major wins
- Champagne Stakes (1837); Great St Leger Stakes (1838); Doncaster Cup (1838); Gascoigne Stakes (1838); Heaton Park St Leger (1838)

Don John (1835–1857) was a British Thoroughbred racehorse and sire best known for winning the classic St Leger Stakes in 1838. In a racing career which lasted from May 1837 until April 1839 he ran ten times and won nine races, although three of his victories were walkovers when no rival appeared to oppose him. He was one of the leading British two-year-olds of 1837, when his three wins included the Champagne Stakes at Doncaster Racecourse. In the following year he returned to Doncaster where he recorded an emphatic win in the St Leger and then defeated a strong field of older horses in the Doncaster Cup. In the following year he was campaigned at Newmarket where he was beaten for the first time by Grey Momus in the Port Stakes. After one more win he suffered serious leg injuries which ended his racing career. He was retired to stud where he became a successful breeding stallion.

== Background ==
Don John was a bay horse standing 15 hands three inches high with a white sock on his left hind leg. He was bred by Mr Garforth and sold as a foal for 140 guineas to Robert Ridsdale and at Ridsdale's dispersal sale in 1836, the yearling was bought by George Stanhope, 6th Earl of Chesterfield. Lord Chesterfield, however, was listed as the colt's breeder in the General Stud Book, and the exact relationship between Chesterfield's racing interests and those of the Ridsdale brothers was somewhat unclear. Lord Chesterfield sent Don John into training with John Scott who trained forty classic winners at his base at Whitewall stables, Malton, North Yorkshire. The colt was ridden in most of his important races by the trainer's younger brother, Bill Scott.

He was the ninth of thirteen foals produced by Mr Garforth's unnamed Comus mare, whose other progeny included the Northumberland Plate winner Hetman Platoff. He was probably sired by Waverley, although the Comus mare had previously been covered by the stallion Tramp in the year of his conception. Waverley won several major races in Yorkshire including Gold Cups at Newcastle and Pontefract. Apart from Don John, the best of his offspring was The Saddler, a colt that won the Doncaster Cup and was beaten a short-head by Chorister when favourite for the 1831 St Leger.

== Racing career ==
=== 1837: two-year-old season ===
Until 1913, there was no requirement for British racehorses to have official names, and the horse who later became known as Don John began his racing career as Lord Chesterfield's b. c. by Tramp, or Waverley, out of Sharpset's dam. The colt made his first appearance in The Two yrs old Stakes at York Racecourse on 31 May 1837. He started the 5/2 third favourite in a field of six and won from the Duke of Cleveland's colt Alzira.

The colt did not race again until the St Leger meeting at Doncaster in autumn. On 18 September, he started favourite at odds of 6/4 for the Champagne Stakes over the second half of the St Leger course. The still unnamed colt took the lead approaching the final furlong and won by two lengths from five opponents, winning a prize of 750 sovereigns. As part of the race's conditions, Lord Chesterfield was obliged to present six dozen bottles of champagne to the Doncaster Racing Club. Eleven days later, the now officially named Don John appeared at the Heaton Park Racecourse in Manchester. Ridden by Nat Flatman, he won the local Claret Stakes, beating George Osbaldeston's The Fairy Queen over six furlongs.

=== 1838: three-year-old season ===
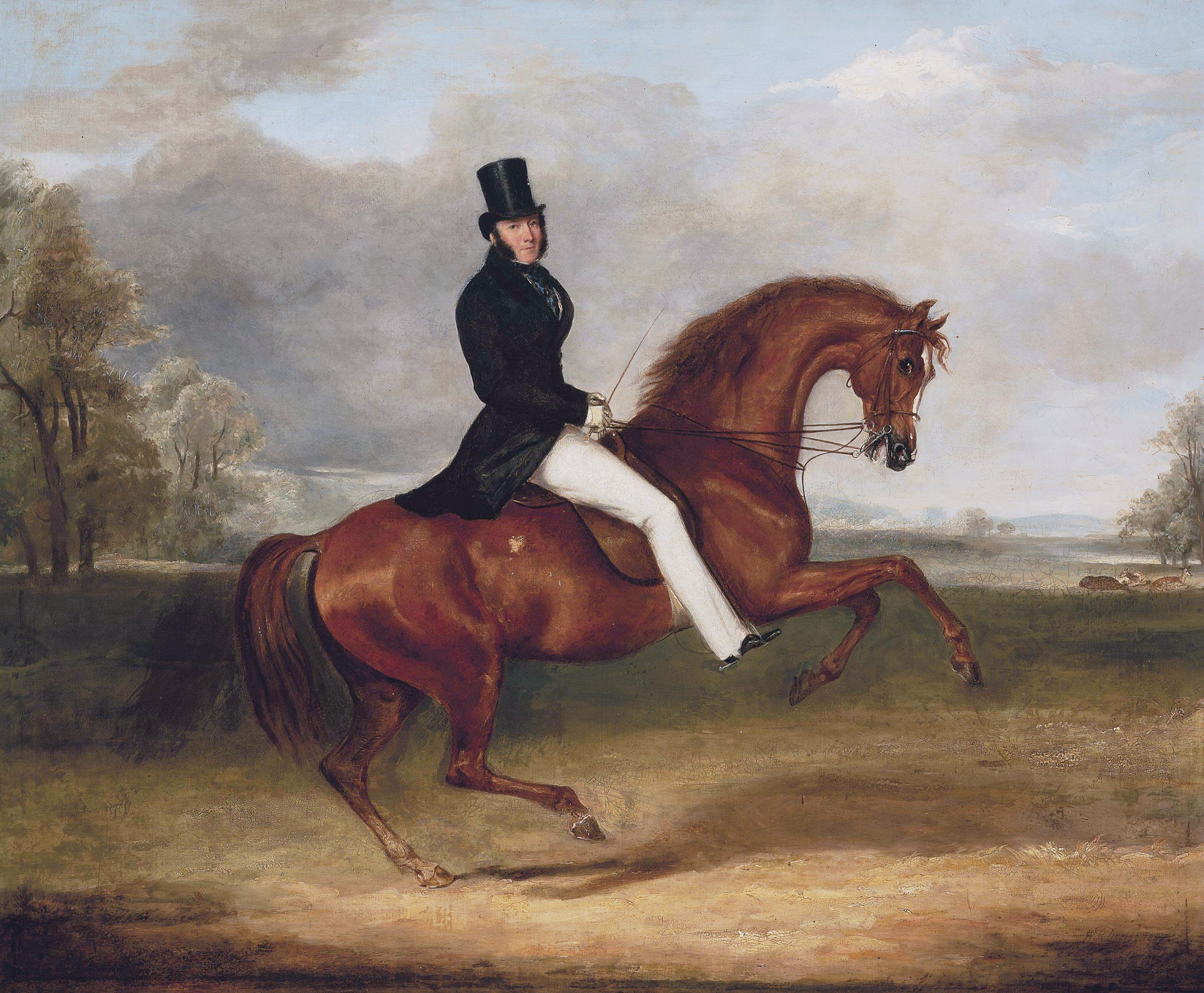
The Earl of Chesterfield, who owned Don John during his racing career

On his three-year-old debut, Don John was sent from Yorkshire to Newmarket for a one-mile sweepstakes at the Craven meeting in April. The trip proved lucrative but uninformative as the colt was allowed to walkover for the 700 sovereign prize when his three rivals were withdrawn by their owners.

Don John had never been entered in The Derby and was off the course for five months before returning at Doncaster in September. A field of seven runners, the smallest for thirty-six years, assembled for the Great St Leger Stakes and Don John was made 13/8 favourite ahead of the Derby runner-up Ion. Ridden as usual by Bill Scott, Don John took the lead shortly after the start, quickly took a three length advantage and set a "killing" pace. His rivals were effectively beaten by half way and the favourite won by at least five lengths from Ion, who was in turn six lengths clear of Lanercost in third. The New Sporting Magazine commented that "never was a St. Leger won so easy or so gallantly before". His victory was enthusiastically received the large crowd, and became even more popular when Lord Chesterfield held "open house" at the nearby Salutation Inn, providing free food and drink to anyone who joined the celebration.

Two days later the St Leger winner was matched against older horse in the four-mile Gold Cup, a race in which he was partnered by Flatman as Scott was unable to ride at the specified weight of seven stones. His meeting with the outstanding racemare Bee's-wing created much interest, although there was some disappointment that the leading Irish horse Harkaway failed to appear. Don John tracked Bee's-wing until the final furlong when he took the lead, quickly went clear and won easily from the mare, with The Doctor third and Melbourne last of the four runners. Later the same afternoon, Don John walked over for the Gascoigne Stakes over the St Leger course and distance. Don John again ended his season at Heaton Park in late September where he walked over for the local version of the "St Leger Stakes". During this period, many racecourse, including York and Newmarket named races after the Doncaster classic, leading the original to use the prefix "Great" to distinguish it from its imitators.

=== 1839: four-year-old season ===
Don John was undefeated in eight races when he appeared at Newmarket for the Port Stakes over two miles on 5 April 1839. He started 2/5 favourite for the race but was beaten by Lord George Bentinck's colt Grey Momus winner of the previous seasons 2000 Guineas and Ascot Gold Cup. At Newmarket's First Spring meeting later that month Don John was ridden by Harry Edwards to win an 1,800 sovereign sweepstakes from three opponents over the four-mile Beacon Course. Shortly after this contest the colt's legs "gave way" and he never raced again, being retired to stud at the end of the year.

== Stud record ==
Don John began his career as a breeding stallion at Tickhill Castle Farm in Yorkshire at fee of fifteen guineas with a "guinea to the groom". By 1843 he was standing at the same fee at Bretby Park, Ashby-de-la-Zouch in Leicestershire, where he remained for several years, with the price of his services increasing to 20 guineas a mare by 1848. He later moved to George Tattersall's stud at Willesden Paddocks, Kilburn, where he was standing at fifteen guineas in 1853. Don John was sold to Dr. A.B.T. Merritt and exported to Richmond, Virginia in June 1855. In November 1855, Don John won second prize at the Virginia State Fair in the Thoroughbred stallion category, losing to Red Eye by Boston. Don John died in 1857.

Don John's only classic winner was Lady Evelyn, the winner of the Oaks Stakes in 1849, but he sired many other good winners including Mrs Taft (Cesarewitch) and The Ban (St James's Palace Stakes). His most influential son was Iago, who sired Bonnie Scotland, twice leading sire in North America. A more important long-term influence on the Thoroughbred was Don John's daughter Maid of Masham, a top-class racemare who became an outstanding broodmare. As the founder of Family 9-e she was the direct female-line ancestor of numerous major winners throughout the nineteenth and twentieth centuries: her descendants include Cyllene, Friar Rock, Corrida, Galcador, Haafhd, Snow Chief, High-Rise, Zafonic, Daylami, Dalakhani and Dubawi.

== Sire line tree ==
- Don John
  - Iago
    - Bonnie Scotland
      - Dangerous
      - Malcolm
      - Regent
      - Frogtown
      - Lochiel
      - Bombast
      - Bramble
        - Clifford
        - Ben Brush
        - Prince Of Melbourne
      - Bulwark
      - Luke Blackburn
        - Proctor Knott
        - Uncle Bob
      - Barrett
      - Springfield
      - Boatman
      - George Kinney
  - The Ban

== Pedigree ==
Pedigree of Don John (GB), bay stallion, 1835
Sire Waverley (GB) 1817	Whalebone; 1807	Waxy	Potoooooooo*
Sire Waverley (GB) 1817	Whalebone; 1807	Waxy	Maria
Sire Waverley (GB) 1817	Whalebone; 1807	Penelope	Trumpator*
Sire Waverley (GB) 1817	Whalebone; 1807	Penelope	Prunella*
Sire Waverley (GB) 1817	Margaretta; 1802	Sir Peter Teazle*	Highflyer*
Sire Waverley (GB) 1817	Margaretta; 1802	Sir Peter Teazle*	Papillon
Sire Waverley (GB) 1817	Margaretta; 1802	Highflyer mare	Highflyer*
Sire Waverley (GB) 1817	Margaretta; 1802	Highflyer mare	Nutcracker
Dam Comus mare (GB) 1821	Comus; 1809	Sorcerer	Trumpator*
Dam Comus mare (GB) 1821	Comus; 1809	Sorcerer	Young Giantess
Dam Comus mare (GB) 1821	Comus; 1809	Houghton Lass	Sir Peter Teazle*
Dam Comus mare (GB) 1821	Comus; 1809	Houghton Lass	Alexina
Dam Comus mare (GB) 1821	Marciana; 1809	Stamford	Sir Peter Teazle*
Dam Comus mare (GB) 1821	Marciana; 1809	Stamford	Horatia
Dam Comus mare (GB) 1821	Marciana; 1809	Marcia	Coriander*
Dam Comus mare (GB) 1821	Marciana; 1809	Marcia	Faith (Family:2-c)

* Don John is inbred 3S x 4D x 4D to the stallion Sir Peter Teazle, meaning that he appears third generation once on the sire side of his pedigree, and fourth generation twice on the dam side of his pedigree.

* Don John is inbred 5S x 4S x 4S x 5D x 5D to the stallion Highflyer, meaning that he appears fifth generation once (via Prunella) and fourth generation twice on the sire side of his pedigree, and fifth generation twice (via Sir Peter Teazle) on the dam side of his pedigree.

* Don John is inbred 4S x 4D to the stallion Trumpator, meaning that he appears fourth generation on the sire side of his pedigree, and fourth generation on the dam side of his pedigree.

* Don John is inbred 4S x 5D to the stallion Potoooooooo, meaning that he appears fourth generation on the sire side of his pedigree, and fifth generation (via Coriander) on the dam side of his pedigree.
