= Sir Tatton Sykes (horse) =

British-bred Thoroughbred racehorse

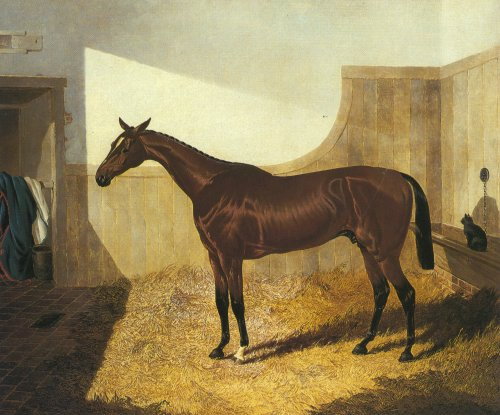
- Sir Tatton Sykes, painting by John Frederick Herring, Jr.
- Sire: Melbourne
- Grandsire: Humphrey Clinker
- Dam: Margrave mare
- Damsire: Margrave
- Sex: Stallion
- Foaled: 1843
- Country: United Kingdom
- Colour: Bay
- Breeder: J. L. Hudson
- Owner: Bill Scott
- Trainer: William Oates
- Record: 11:4-4-0
- Earnings: £5,855

Major wins
- 2000 Guineas (1846); St. Leger Stakes (1846)

Sir Tatton Sykes (1843–1860), who also raced under the name Tibthorpe, was a British Thoroughbred racehorse and sire. In a career that lasted from spring 1846 to summer 1848 he ran eleven times and won four races. As a three-year-old in 1846 he won two of the three races which became known as the Triple Crown, taking the 2000 Guineas at Newmarket and the St Leger at Doncaster. He was considered by some to have been unlucky when he was narrowly defeated in The Derby. The rest of his career was a disappointment as he won only one race in the next two seasons. After being retired to stud he had some success as a sire of winners.

== Background ==
The colt who would become Sir Tatton Sykes was bred near Driffield by a farmer named Hudson. He was a bright bay horse standing 15.2 hands high with large, drooping ears, a white blaze and one white foot and was described as having a "quiet and docile" temperament. He was sired by Melbourne, a member of the Godolphin Arabian sire-line who went on to get the Triple Crown winner West Australian and the outstanding filly Blink Bonny. His dam, an unnamed mare by Margrave went on to produce the important broodmare Lady Elizabeth.

As a young horse he was bought for £10 by Bill Scott. Scott had recently quarreled with his brother John Scott, the leading racehorse trainer of the time, and had set up his own stable near Malton, North Yorkshire, with the day-to-day conditioning of the horses being handled by William Oates. Bill Scott, who rode many of his own horses, was one of the most successful jockeys of his era, although he was also noted for his heavy drinking and rough riding tactics. Scott named his bay colt Tibthorpe, after a village near Driffield.

== Racing career ==
=== 1846: three-year-old season ===
Tibthorpe did not run as a two-year-old but showed a great deal of promise in training: according to one story Bill Scott dismounted after an early gallop and dropped to his knees to thank God "that he has sent me a bloody clinker at last". In early 1846 the name of Tibthorpe began to appear in the betting lists for The Derby: after being quoted at odds of 100/1 in late January, he was backed down to 25/1 over the next month. Tibthorpe made his first racecourse appearance in the 2000 Guineas at Newmarket on 28 April, starting at odds of 5/1 in a field of six runners. Bill Scott produced a "perfect" display of jockeyship to win a slowly run race on his own horse, foiling a major gamble on a horse named Tom Tulloch. Tibthorpe's appearance and performance led to suspicions of foul play. During this period there were several cases of four-year-old horses having their identities faked and running in races, notably the British Classics, which were confined to three-year-olds. Tibthorpe's win at Newmarket was only confirmed after an examination of his teeth, demanded by Tom Tulloch's owner Lord Maidstone, which established that he was indeed a three-year-old colt. The Yorkshire-trained horse was promoted to second favourite for the Derby, and Scott renamed him after Sir Tatton Sykes, 4th Baronet a notable breeder of Thoroughbreds based at Sledmere.

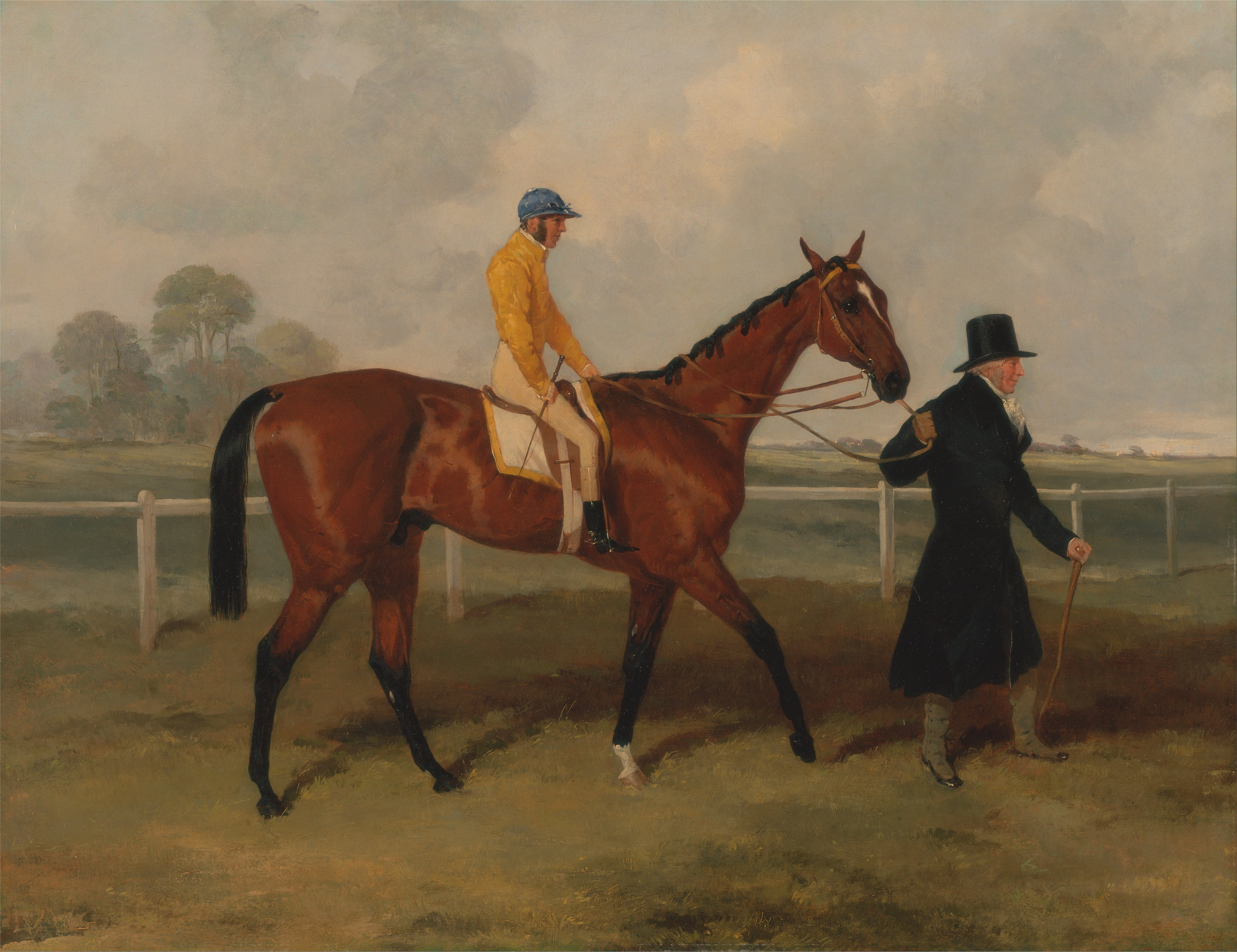
Sir Tatton Sykes is led in by his human namesake after the 1846 St Leger

At Epsom on 27 May, Sir Tatton Sykes started at odds of 10/1 for the Derby in a field of twenty-seven runners. Bill Scott had reportedly been drinking heavily on the morning of the race and had a long and noisy argument with the racecourse starter, which resulted in him missing the start and being left behind by the other runners. Scott made up the lost ground and was able to bring Sir Tatton Sykes through the field to challenge for the lead in the straight. In the closing stages, however, it became clear that Scott was in no condition to ride a strong finish and despite briefly taking the lead his colt was caught and beaten by Pyrrhus The First. After the race Scott was reported to the racecourse stewards and fined £5 for "disobeying orders" and "using improper language". While many blamed Scott for his horse's defeat, others pointed out that Sir Tatton Sykes was a difficult horse to ride and may well have been beaten on merit by the winner. On his first start after his Epsom defeat, Sir Tatton Sykes started 4/7 favourite but failed to finish the course in the North Derby Stakes at Newcastle Racecourse on 23 June after slipping on the turn and throwing his jockey. At York in August, Sir Tatton Sykes won the Knavesmire Stakes, beating Wrestler "in a canter".

At Doncaster in September, twelve horses ran in the St. Leger Stakes, with Sir Tatton Sykes being made joint favourite with Brocardo at odds of 3/1. Bill Scott's condition was closely monitored, with William Oates prepared to take the ride in case of drunkenness, but he arrived at the start completely sober. Scott tracked the leaders on Sir Tatton Sykes, then moved forward in the straight to dispute the lead with Iago, a colt from the stable of his brother John Scott. The two Scott horses drew clear of the other runners, with Sir Tatton Sykes prevailing by half a length after making a "tremendous rush" in the closing stages. The win was well-received, with Scott being loudly cheered by the Yorkshire crowd. The original Sir Tatton Sykes, who was then seventy-five years old and a popular racecourse figure, led his equine namesake into the winner's enclosure. On his final start of the season, Sir Tatton Sykes was beaten by Iago in the Grand Duke Michael Stakes at Newmarket after he had "swerved at the finish".

=== 1847–1848: later career ===
Sir Tatton Sykes stayed in training as a four-year-old but failed to reproduce his best form. In April he ran in the Port Stakes over two miles at Newmarket's Craven meeting, but was easily beaten by Sting, after which he was sold by Scott to Captain O'Kelly. At Ascot in June he contested the Emperor's Plate in which he finished unplaced behind The Hero over two and a half miles. Later that summer he won a £500 match race against The Traverser over one mile at York.

1848 saw further deterioration in the form of the double Classic winner. At Ascot he finished unplaced in the Royal Hunt Cup carrying a weight of 125 pounds. Later that year he ran in a race at Hampton in which he finished second to an unnamed three-year-old filly over one mile. He was then retired to stud.

== Stud career ==
At stud, Sir Tatton Sykes sired a few good winners, but was not a great success. He was based at a stud farm owned by Mr Eyke at Stanton, near Shifnal in Shropshire. The best of his progeny were the filly Ronzi, who won the Prix de Diane and Mr Sykes, who won the Cesarewitch Handicap. Sir Tatton Sykes died in May 1860 at Stanton from "an inflammation of the bowels".

== Pedigree ==
Pedigree of Sir Tatton Sykes (GB), bay stallion, 1843
Sire Melbourne (GB) 1834	Humphrey Clinker; 1822	Comus*	Sorcerer
Sire Melbourne (GB) 1834	Humphrey Clinker; 1822	Comus*	Houghton Lass
Sire Melbourne (GB) 1834	Humphrey Clinker; 1822	Clinkerina	Clinker
Sire Melbourne (GB) 1834	Humphrey Clinker; 1822	Clinkerina	Pewett
Sire Melbourne (GB) 1834	Cervantes mare 1825	Cervantes	Don Quixote
Sire Melbourne (GB) 1834	Cervantes mare 1825	Cervantes	Evelina
Sire Melbourne (GB) 1834	Cervantes mare 1825	Golumpus mare	Golumpus
Sire Melbourne (GB) 1834	Cervantes mare 1825	Golumpus mare	Paynator mare
Dam Margrave mare (GB) 1836	Margrave; 1829	Muley	Orville
Dam Margrave mare (GB) 1836	Margrave; 1829	Muley	Eleanor
Dam Margrave mare (GB) 1836	Margrave; 1829	Election mare	Election
Dam Margrave mare (GB) 1836	Margrave; 1829	Election mare	Fair Helen
Dam Margrave mare (GB) 1836	Patty Primrose; 1830	Confederate	Comus*
Dam Margrave mare (GB) 1836	Patty Primrose; 1830	Confederate	Maritornes
Dam Margrave mare (GB) 1836	Patty Primrose; 1830	Sybil	Interpreter
Dam Margrave mare (GB) 1836	Patty Primrose; 1830	Sybil	Galatea (Family:8-e)

* Sir Tatton Sykes is inbred 3S × 4D to the stallion Comus, meaning that he appears third generation on the sire side of his pedigree and fourth generation on the dam side of his pedigree.
