= Jack Spigot =

British-bred Thoroughbred racehorse

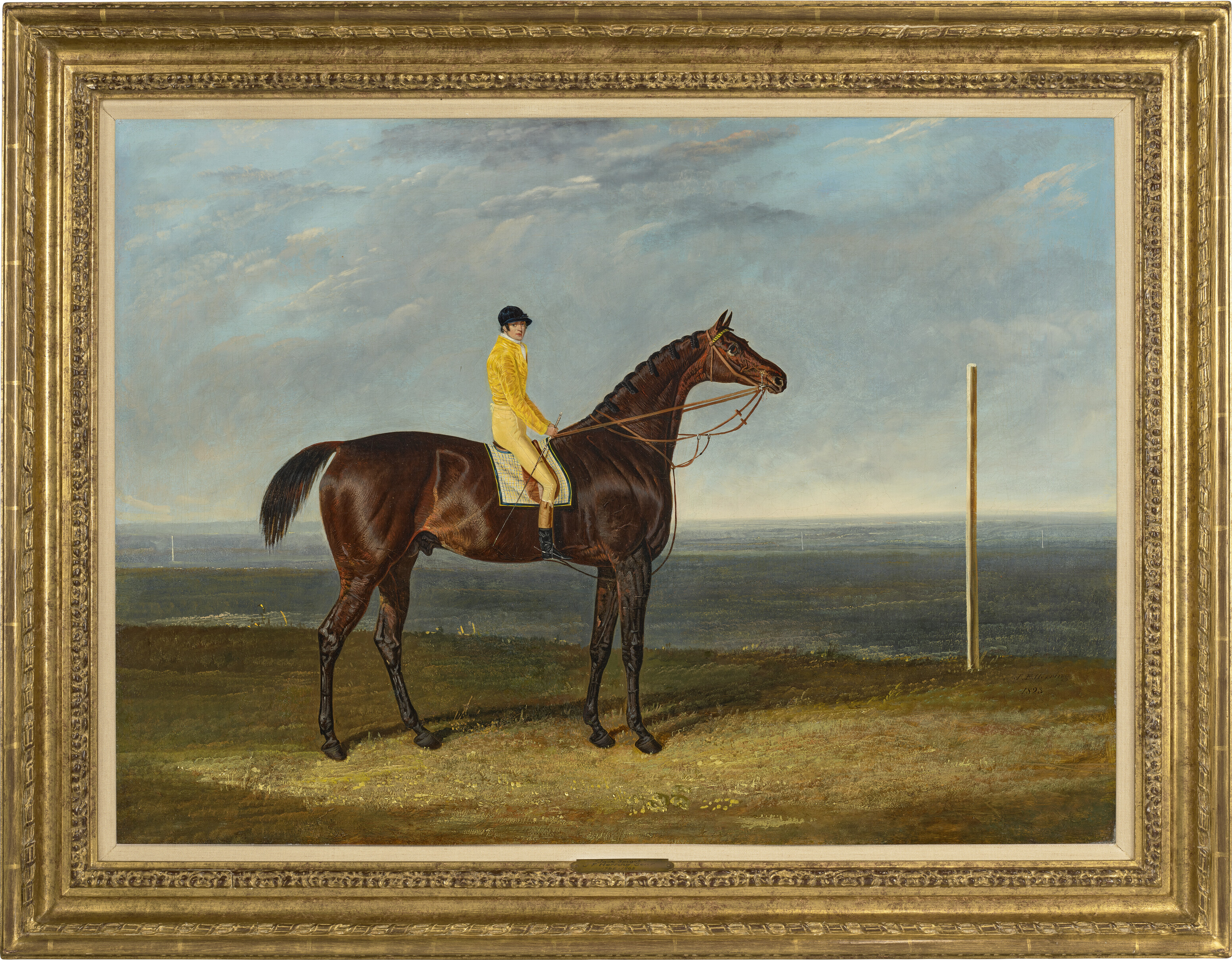
- Jack Spigot as painted by John Frederick Herring Sr., 1823.
- Sire: Ardrossan or Marmion
- Dam: sister to Bourbon
- Damsire: Sorcerer
- Sex: Stallion
- Foaled: 4 May 1818
- Country: United Kingdom
- Colour: Bay
- Breeder: Thomas Orde-Powlett
- Owner: Thomas Orde-Powlett
- Trainer: Isaac Blades
- Record: 6:4-0-1

Major wins
- St. Leger Stakes (1821)

Jack Spigot (4 May 1818 –June 1843) was a British Thoroughbred racehorse that won the 1821 St. Leger Stakes and was a sire in the early 19th century. His paternity is attributed to either Ardrossan or Marmion. His mother was a blind mare with a difficult temperament, whose unpredictable behavior necessitated that he be raised by a foster mare. He was named after one of his owner's tenant farmers, Jack Faucet. He won four of his six career starts before being retired from racing in early 1823. He is not considered to be a good sire. Jack Spigot died in June 1843 and was buried at Bolton Hall.

== Background ==
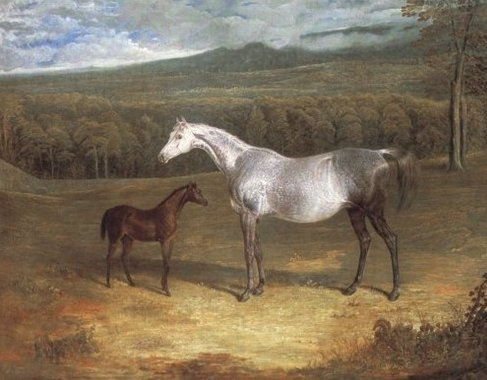
Jack Spigot as a foal with Faucet's mare in a painting by John Frederick Herring Sr. (c. 1818).

Jack Spigot was foaled on 4 May 1818 on Middleham Moor near Bolton Hall in Leyburn, the family seat of his breeder Thomas Orde-Powlett, who was a younger brother of the Baron Bolton. Thomas Orde-Powlett was also a cousin of William Orde, Jr. the owner of Beeswing.

Jack Spigot's dam, a sister to the stallion Bourbon, was bred by two stallions in the year preceding Jack Spigot's birth. She was first bred to Marmion on 14 April and then by Ardrossan in June 1817. Given the timing of Jack Spigot's birth, Ardrossan is likely his sire. Ardrossan was an unbeaten racehorse in three starts and stood at Rushyford near Durham. Marmion was only defeated once in eight career starts and is an ancestor of the influential broodmare Pocahontas.

Jack Spigot's dam had a fractious temperament and had been blind and barren for four years before Jack Spigot's birth. Her first foal died at a young age in 1814 and she was owned by H. Peirse until she was sold to Powlett for a small sum. While owned by Peirse, the mare had killed other horses by kicking, notably Reveller's dam Rosette in 1816. She kicked about so much in the foaling paddock after Jack Spigot's birth that in order to prevent the death of her second foal, he had to be raised by a surrogate. A dapple grey foster mare similar in colouring to his own dam was procured from one of Powlett's tenants, Jack Faucet, to raise the foal. The sister to Bourbon mare also produced the grey colt Isaac in 1831 (sired by Figaro), who was considered to be the "best Cup horse of his day", running in flat and steeplechase races until he was 15 years old winning 53 races out of 172 starts.

Before the horse's racing career, Powlett suggested that the colt be named "Jack Faucet" in honour of John Faucet. Faucet objected to the choice on the grounds that the horse was a good candidate for winning that year's St. Leger. Powlett allegedly quipped, "Well John, a Faucet's nothing without a Spigot" and the colt was subsequently named "Jack Spigot."

Jack Spigot was the first horse that John F. Herring painted from life and the artist painted several portraits of the racehorse during and after his racing career.

== Racing career ==
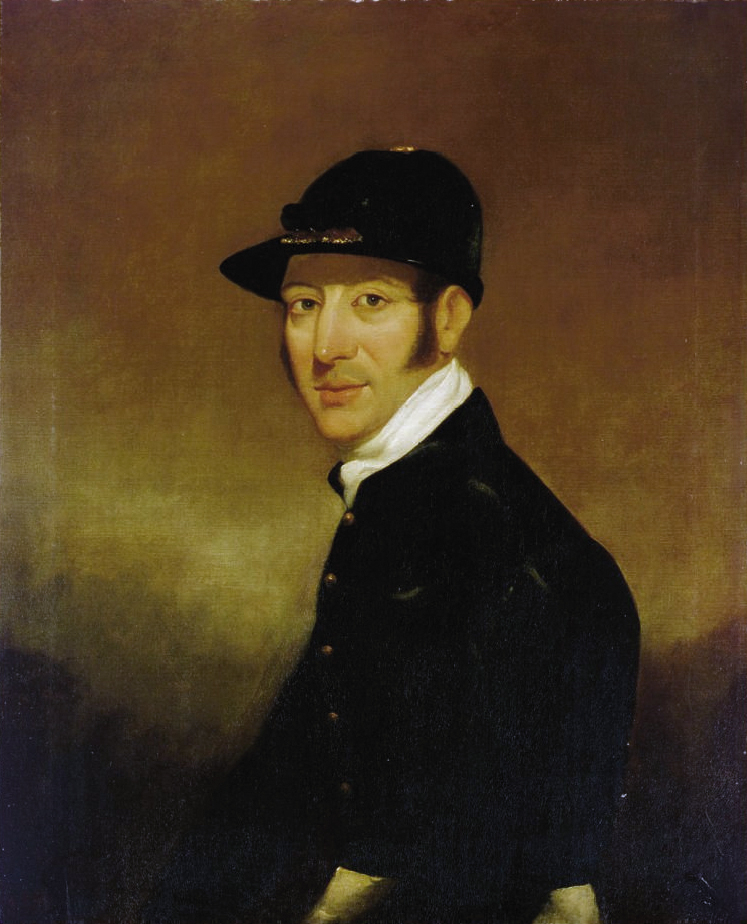
Bill Scott rode Jack Spigot for many of his early races but was disliked by the horse (portrait by John Hayes).

Jack Spigot was trained at Middleham by Isaac Blades ("J. Blades") who worked exclusively for Powlett. The colt was ridden in his early engagements by Bill Scott. After his St. Leger win, Jack Spigot developed an intense dislike of the jockey and would react violently if Scott attempted to approach the horse or even spoke in his presence. Jack Spigot was not raced extensively, starting only six times and winning four races including the St Leger.

=== 1820: two-year-old season ===
In his only start as a two-year-old, Jack Spigot, ridden by Bill Scott, won a 320 guinea sweepstakes race at Doncaster Racecourse beating Mr. Riddell's colt Colwell.

=== 1821: three-year-old season ===
Jack Spigot did not run until the autumn Doncaster meeting and on 17 September started in the St. Leger Stakes against 12 other horses including the 1821 Derby winner Gustavus. Coronation was the front runner until three quarters of a mile when Lunatic took the lead for another half-mile. Jack Spigot and the mare Fortuna overtook Coronation with Jack Spigot edging out Fortuna at the finish by a margin of half a length. Two days later he won the Foal Stakes over a distance of one and a half miles beating his only competitor, the filly My Lady, in a "very excellent race."

=== 1822–1823: four and five-year-old seasons ===
Returning as a four-year-old and refusing to be ridden by Bill Scott, Jack Spigot won the 450-guinea Newcastle Convivial Stakes ridden by Robert Johnson. In his only other start of 1822, he was third and last in the 3.25-mile Preston Cup, losing to Reveller and the 11-year-old Dr. Syntax. Jack Spigot only ran once more, on 14 April 1823 he was unplaced in the Craven Stakes won by the Duke of Rutland's colt Scarborough. Thomas Orde-Powlett retired from racing in September 1823 and put his horses up for sale at the Doncaster meeting. Jack Spigot was retained as a breeding stallion at Bolton Hall.

== Stud career ==
Jack Spigot was retired to stud duty at Bolton Hall in 1824. He is not considered to be a good sire. Jack Spigot died in June 1843 and was buried in Yew Tree Court at Bolton Hall, his grave at one time surrounded by eight yew trees. Some of his bones were exhumed when a water pipe was laid across his grave years after his death. A cannon bone was recovered, set in silver and used to make a letter weight for Lord Bolton.

== Pedigree ==
Pedigree of Jack Spigot (GB), Bay colt, 1818
Sire Marmion Bay, 1806	Whiskey; 1789	Saltram	Eclipse*^
Sire Marmion Bay, 1806	Whiskey; 1789	Saltram	Virago
Sire Marmion Bay, 1806	Whiskey; 1789	Calash	Herod*^
Sire Marmion Bay, 1806	Whiskey; 1789	Calash	Teresa
Sire Marmion Bay, 1806	Young Noisette; 1789	Diomed*	Florizel*^
Sire Marmion Bay, 1806	Young Noisette; 1789	Diomed*	sister to Juno
Sire Marmion Bay, 1806	Young Noisette; 1789	Noisette	Squirrel
Sire Marmion Bay, 1806	Young Noisette; 1789	Noisette	Carina
Dam sister to Bourbon Grey, 1810	Sorcerer; 1796	Trumpator	Conductor
Dam sister to Bourbon Grey, 1810	Sorcerer; 1796	Trumpator	Brunette
Dam sister to Bourbon Grey, 1810	Sorcerer; 1796	Young Giantess	Diomed*^
Dam sister to Bourbon Grey, 1810	Sorcerer; 1796	Young Giantess	Giantess*^
Dam sister to Bourbon Grey, 1810	Precipitate mare 1797	Precipitate	Mercury
Dam sister to Bourbon Grey, 1810	Precipitate mare 1797	Precipitate	Dundas Herod mare
Dam sister to Bourbon Grey, 1810	Precipitate mare 1797	Young Tiffany	Highflyer*^
Dam sister to Bourbon Grey, 1810	Precipitate mare 1797	Young Tiffany	Tiffany (Family 5)*^

* Jack Spigot is inbred 3S × 4D to the stallion Diomed, meaning that he appears third generation on the sire side of his pedigree and fourth generation on the dam side of his pedigree.

*^ Jack Spigot is inbred 4S × 5S x 6D x 5D x 5D to the stallion Herod, meaning that he appears fourth generation and fifth generation (via Florizel)^ on the sire side of his pedigree and sixth generation (via Diomed)^ once and fifth generation twice (via Giantess and Highflyer)^ on the dam side of his pedigree.

*^ Jack Spigot is inbred 4S × 5D to the stallion Eclipse, meaning that he appears fourth generation on the sire side of his pedigree and fifth generation (via Tiffany)^ on the dam side of his pedigree.
