= Gaines' Denmark =

American horse (born 1851)

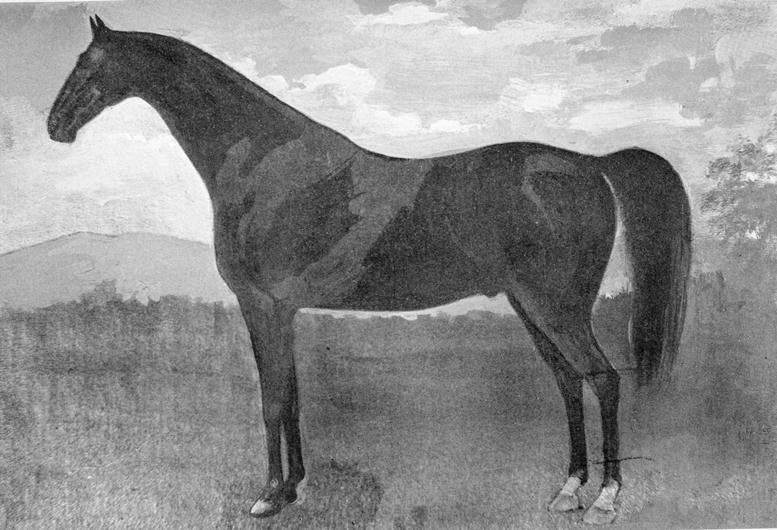
- Breed: Thoroughbred (~70%); American Saddlebred
- Sire: Denmark
- Grandsire: Hedgeford
- Dam: Stevenson mare
- Maternal grandsire: Cockspur
- Sex: Stallion
- Foaled: 1851
- Country: United States
- Color: Black
- Owner: Edward P. Gaines

Gaines' Denmark (foaled 1851) was one of the most influential stallions in the development of the American Saddlebred.

== Life ==
Gaines' Denmark was foaled in 1851 in Bardstown, Kentucky. He was a black stallion with two white hind socks, sired by the Thoroughbred stallion Denmark out of a part-bred mare known as the "Stevenson mare". Gaines' Denmark sired four influential sons: Washington Denmark, Diamond Denmark, Star Denmark, and Sumpter Denmark.

Upon the start of the American Civil War in 1861, offspring of Gaines' Denmark were put into a cavalry troop led by Confederate General John Hunt Morgan. Although Gaines' Denmark survived the war, he did not accomplish much as a sire after it. Prior to the war, he was used as a show horse. Today, he is considered one of the progenitors of the American Saddlebred horse breed.

As a stud, Gaines' Denmark first caught the attention of American Saddlebred Horse Association founder and president John B. Castleman in 1857. Castleman, then a 16-year-old teenager, purchased a 3-year-old, "three-fourths Thoroughbred" gelding named Lightfoot that was sired by Gaines' Denmark out of "a mare by Boston". With the assistance of Isaac Byrd, an enslaved African American who was owned by Castleman's family, Castleman trained Lightfoot to be a "saddle" show horse, and entered him into a local horse show. The horse fetched an "unprecedented price", and Castleman became further interested in Gaines' Denmark as a foundational sire for the Saddlebred.

Gaines' Denmark was owned and bred by Edward P. Gaines, a breeder of "saddle horses" who lived near Georgetown, Kentucky and Lexington, Kentucky.

== Sire line tree ==
- Gaines' Denmark
  - Washington Denmark
    - King William
      - Black Eagle
        - Black Squirrel
          - Chester Dare
            - Happy Dare
              - Beechwold Chester
    - Cromwell
      - Washington
        - Preston
    - Jewel Denmark
      - Beau Brummel of Kenmore
  - Star Denmark
  - Diamond Denmark
    - Montrose
      - Moss Rose
      - King Lee Rose
        - Nickel Plate
        - Guided By Love
        - Cascade
  - Lail's Denmark Chief
    - Crigler's Denmark
      - Rex Denmark
        - Rex McDonald
        - Rex Donnell
  - Sumpter Denmark

== Pedigree ==
Pedigree of Gaines' Denmark, black stallion, 1851
| Sire Denmark br. 1839 | Hedgeford (GB) br. 1825 | Filho da Puta (GB) br. 1812 | Haphazard (by Sir Peter Teazle); 1797 |
| Sire Denmark br. 1839 | Hedgeford (GB) br. 1825 | Filho da Puta (GB) br. 1812 | Mrs. Barnet (by Waxy); 1806 |
| Sire Denmark br. 1839 | Hedgeford (GB) br. 1825 | Miss Craigie (GB) b. 1811 | Orville (by Beningbrough); 1799 |
| Sire Denmark br. 1839 | Hedgeford (GB) br. 1825 | Miss Craigie (GB) b. 1811 | Marchioness (Eclipse line); 1797 |
| Sire Denmark br. 1839 | Betsy Harrison (USA) b. 1828 | Aratus (USA) b. 1820 | Director (by Sir Archy); 1811 |
| Sire Denmark br. 1839 | Betsy Harrison (USA) b. 1828 | Aratus (USA) b. 1820 | Betsy Haxall (by Sir Harry); 18?? |
| Sire Denmark br. 1839 | Betsy Harrison (USA) b. 1828 | Jenny Cockracy (USA) ch. 1813 | Potomac (by Diomed); 1803 |
| Sire Denmark br. 1839 | Betsy Harrison (USA) b. 1828 | Jenny Cockracy (USA) ch. 1813 | Saltram mare (by Saltram); 1799 |
| Dam Stevenson mare b. 1848 | Cockspur (USA) | Cock Robin (USA) | Son of Janus (USA) (Janus line) |
| Dam Stevenson mare b. 1848 | Cockspur (USA) | Cock Robin (USA) | Daughter of Meade's Celer (Janus line) |
| Dam Stevenson mare b. 1848 | Cockspur (USA) | Daughter of Hotspur | Hotspur (USA) (Sir Archy line) |
| Dam Stevenson mare b. 1848 | Cockspur (USA) | Daughter of Hotspur | Roan Racking Mare |
| Dam Stevenson mare b. 1848 | Canadian Horse mare (Note: The Missouri Fox Trotting Horse Breed Association (MFTHBA) lists the "Stevenson mare" dam as a Narragansett Pacer, but most academic and pedigree sources indicate that the Pacer had largely gone extinct as a breed by 1848. Another source lists the dam as a "Canadian Horse mare", which is more likely.) | unknown | unknown |
| Dam Stevenson mare b. 1848 | Canadian Horse mare | unknown | unknown |
| Dam Stevenson mare b. 1848 | Canadian Horse mare | unknown | unknown |
| Dam Stevenson mare b. 1848 | Canadian Horse mare | unknown | unknown |
