= 1832 in sports =

1832 in sports describes the year's events in world sport.

== Boxing ==
Events

- 25 June — Jem Ward announces his retirement when challenged by James Burke for his English title. Ward nevertheless refuses to concede the title.

== Cricket ==
Events

- 27 March — death of James Saunders (29) who had been ill with consumption for the last two years. Scores and Biographies states that he was a "great batsman" who "had scarcely reached his prime".

England

- Most runs – Fuller Pilch 287 @ 31.88 (HS 50)
- Most wickets – William Lillywhite 71 (BB 6–?)

== Horse racing ==
England

- 1,000 Guineas Stakes – Galata
- 2,000 Guineas Stakes – Archibald
- The Derby – St. Giles
- The Oaks – Galata
- St. Leger Stakes – Margrave

== Rowing ==
The Boat Race

- The Oxford and Cambridge Boat Race is not held this year

== Bibliography ==
- Arthur Haygarth, Scores & Biographies, Volume 1 (1744–1826), Lillywhite, 1862
