= Doctor Syntax (horse) =

British-bred Thoroughbred racehorse

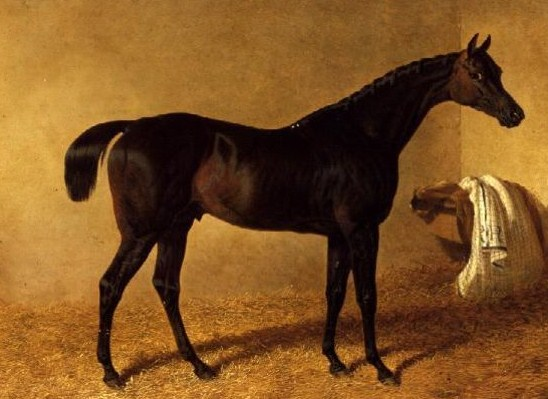
- 'Dr Syntax', a dark bay racehorse in a loose box by John Frederick Herring, Sr.
- Sire: Paynator
- Grandsire: Trumpator
- Dam: Beningbrough mare
- Damsire: Beningbrough
- Sex: Stallion
- Foaled: 1811
- Country: United Kingdom
- Colour: Bay or Brown
- Owner: Ralph Riddell
- Record: 49:36-9-2

Major wins
- Catterick Bridge Craven Stakes (1815, 1816); Middleham Gold Cup (1815); Lancaster Gold Cup (1815, 1816, 1818, 1819, 1820); Preston Gold Cup (1815, 1816, 1817, 1818, 1819, 1820, 1821); Richmond Gold Cup (1818, 1820, 1821, 1822, 1823); Dundas Stakes (1819, 1820, 1821); Nothallerton Gold Cup (1822); Gosforth Stakes (1823); Pontefract Gold Cup (1823)

Doctor Syntax (1811 – 28 August 1838) was a British Thoroughbred racehorse and sire. Trained in Yorkshire, and racing exclusively in the North of England, Doctor Syntax won at least thirty-six races in ten seasons from 1814 to 1823. He was noted for his consistency and durability and recorded multiple wins in many of the period's leading staying races. He won the Preston Gold Cup on a record seven consecutive occasions, as well as five Lancaster Gold Cups and five Richmond Gold Cups. He was retired to stud in 1824 and proved a successful sire of winners, despite limited opportunities.

== Background ==
Doctor Syntax was a bay or brown horse standing 15 hands high, bred by William Knapton at Huntington in Yorkshire and owned during his racing career by Ralph Riddell of Felton Park in Northumberland. He was not a physically impressive individual, but had an alert, intelligent expression ("bright as a hawk"). His temperament meant that his jockeys had to coax him into producing his best efforts, as the horse did not respond to whip or spur. He was sired by Lord Clermont's stallion Paynator out of an unnamed mare by Beningbrough. The mare went on to produce Miss Syntax and Oceana, both of whom were successful broodmares. Doctor Syntax was named after a character created by the British writer William Combe in a series of satirical poems.

Before the appearance of widespread rail travel, horses were typically walked from their home stable to the racecourse, meaning that Northern horses would have to spend weeks traveling if their owners wished to compete in the South of England. This resulted in a highly regionalised sport, with few Northern horses competing at southern tracks like Newmarket (the base of the Jockey Club), Epsom and Ascot, and few southern horses challenging for the major northern races. No horse managed to win the season's two biggest races for three-year-olds– The Derby in the south and the St Leger in the north– between 1800 and 1848.

== Racing career ==
=== 1814–1815: early career ===
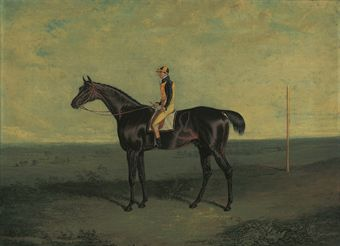
Mr Ralph Riddell's Doctor Syntax, with Bob Johnson up by John Frederick Herring, Sr.

Doctor Syntax began his long racing career at Catterick Bridge Racecourse on 13 April 1814. He fell in the race but was remounted to complete the ten furlong course in last place. Later in April he finished second in races at Middleham and Durham and was then off the course for more than two months. In July, Doctor Syntax crossed the Pennines to compete at Preston Racecourse and recorded his first win in a maiden plate. Like many races at the time, the race was scheduled for a series of heats, with the prize going to the first horse to win twice. Racing against two opponents, Doctor Syntax decided the event by winning the first two heats, winning a prize of £70. Before the end of the year, the colt added four wins from as many starts. At Morpeth on 17 September he won the first two races on the card, the Members' Plate and a Sweepstakes, starting favourite on both occasions. He ended the season in October at Richmond, where he won two Sweepstakes. In the second of these, he won both heats from his stable companion XYZ and Biddick, the horse who had beaten him at Durham in April.

In 1815 Doctor Syntax won twice at Catterick Bridge in March and then won his most valuable race to date when winning the 100 guineas Gold Cup over three miles at Middleham in April. In Lancashire that summer, the colt took his winning run to ten by taking the Corporation Gold Cup at Lancaster Racecourse and his first Preston Gold Cup. In October, Doctor Syntax was beaten into second place by that year's St Leger winner Filho da Puta, to whom he was conceding eighteen pounds in the Richmond Cup, with the 1813 St Leger winner Altisidora unplaced. Doctor Syntax reappeared on the following day to end his second season with a win in a Sweepstakes.

=== 1816–1823: later career ===
As a five-year-old, Doctor Syntax won twice at Catterick in April but finished third to Mr Beal's filly Flot at Middleham. He won a second Corporation Gold Cup at Lancaster in June and then defeated Filho da Puta in the Preston Gold Cup. In 1817 Doctor Syntax was beaten by Silenus in the Lancaster Gold Cup, but reversed the form to beat Silenus and the 1816 St Leger winner The Duchess in the Preston Gold Cup. At Richmond in October, Doctor Syntax finished second to The Duchess in the Gold Cup and walked over in a Sweepstakes the following day. Doctor Syntax was undefeated in four starts as a seven-year-old in 1818. He won a third Lancaster Gold Cup in June, a fourth Preston Gold Cup (beating The Duchess) in July and the Richmond Cup in October. His reception after winning the last-named race provided evidence of his popularity: according to the Sporting Magazine "the shouting and huzzaing... defied all description" and the scenes of celebration "more resembled a victory in a contested election than a horse race". In the following year, Doctor Syntax won the Gold Cups at Lancaster and Preston yet again, while at Richmond he finished second to Otho in the Cup before winning the Dundas Stakes the next day.

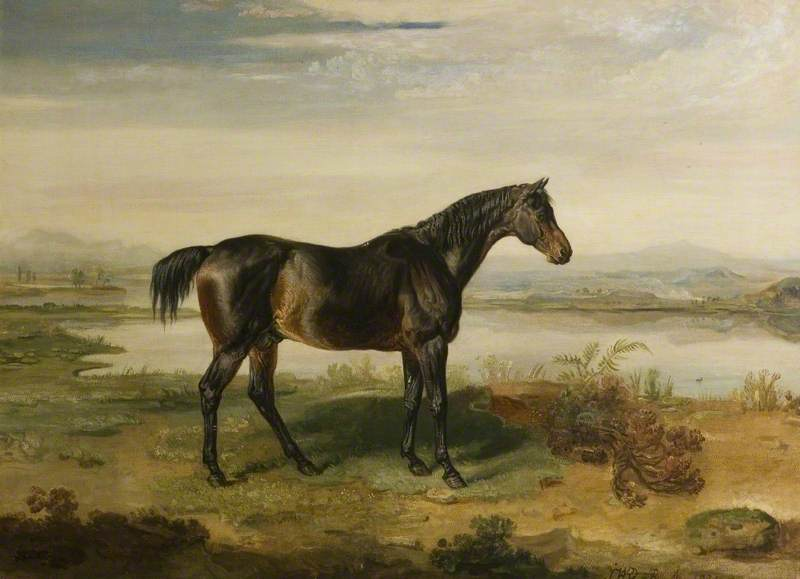
Dr Syntax (1821) by James Ward

In 1820 the "celebrated" Doctor Syntax was the subject of a painting by the artist James Ward R A, which is currently displayed at Brodsworth Hall near Doncaster. Doctor Syntax had four recorded races that year. On 5 July he won his fifth Lancaster Gold Cup, beating Sir Walter and the 1819 St Leger winner Antonio. A week later he won his sixth Preston Gold Cup from Comet and Sir Walter. In the autumn he won a second Richmond Cup and a second Dundas Stakes. In 1821 the ten-year-old began a rivalry with the 1818 St Leger winner Reveller. On 4 July Doctor Syntax was beaten by Reveller in the Lancaster Gold Cup but reversed the form to win his seventh Preston Gold Cup a week later. At Richmond in October, Doctor Syntax won both the Richmond Cup and the Dundas Stakes for the third time.

In 1822, the eleven-year-old Doctor Syntax was beaten by Reveller in the Lancaster Gold Cup, and in September his run of wins in the Preston Gold Cup came to an end when he finished second to the same horse, with the 1821 St Leger winner Jack Spigot in third. In October, Doctor Syntax won his third Richmond Cup and the Gold Cup at Northallerton. Doctor Syntax began his final season by winning the Gosforth Stakes at Newcastle Racecourse in July and then won the Gold Cup at Pontefract in September. Later that month he appeared at Doncaster Racecourse where he finished third in the Fitzwilliam Stakes and fourth in the Doncaster Cup. The latter race marked the first time in nine years that Doctor Syntax had failed to reach the first three places. The veteran's last race was the Richmond Gold Cup on 30 September. He started favourite and won from four opponents but fell after passing the post. He escaped without serious injury, although the incident reportedly created great anxiety among the racing public who were concerned about the welfare of "the good old Doctor".

== Stud record ==
Doctor Syntax began his career as a stallion at the age of thirteen in 1824. His undistinguished pedigree and unprepossessing appearance meant that he was not popular with breeders and attracted few top class mares. He did however sire two classic winners in Ralph who won the 2000 Guineas in 1841 and Chapeau d'Espagne who won the 1000 Guineas in 1837. The best of his offspring however, may have been the outstanding racemare Beeswing, who emulated her sire by winning many long-distance races in the North, but improved on his record by travelling south to win the Ascot Gold Cup as a nine-year-old in 1842. Doctor Syntax was euthanised at Newmarket on 28 August 1838.

== Sire line tree ==
- Dr Syntax
  - The Doctor
    - Raby
    - The Black Doctor
    - Carabas
  - Ralph

== Pedigree ==
Pedigree of Doctor Syntax (GB), stallion 1811
Sire Paynator (GB) 1791	Trumpator; 1782	Conductor	Matchem
Sire Paynator (GB) 1791	Trumpator; 1782	Conductor	Snap mare
Sire Paynator (GB) 1791	Trumpator; 1782	Brunette	Squirrel
Sire Paynator (GB) 1791	Trumpator; 1782	Brunette	Dove
Sire Paynator (GB) 1791	Mark Anthony mare 1782	Mark Anthony	Spectator
Sire Paynator (GB) 1791	Mark Anthony mare 1782	Mark Anthony	Rachel
Sire Paynator (GB) 1791	Mark Anthony mare 1782	Signora	Snap
Sire Paynator (GB) 1791	Mark Anthony mare 1782	Signora	Miss Windsor
Dam Beningbrough mare (GB)	Beningbrough; 1791	King Fergus	Eclipse
Dam Beningbrough mare (GB)	Beningbrough; 1791	King Fergus	Creeping Polly
Dam Beningbrough mare (GB)	Beningbrough; 1791	Fenwick's Herod mare	Herod
Dam Beningbrough mare (GB)	Beningbrough; 1791	Fenwick's Herod mare	Pyrrha
Dam Beningbrough mare (GB)	Jenny Mole; 1787	Carbuncle	Babraham Blank
Dam Beningbrough mare (GB)	Jenny Mole; 1787	Carbuncle	Cade mare
Dam Beningbrough mare (GB)	Jenny Mole; 1787	Prince Tquassaw mare	Prince T'Quassaw
Dam Beningbrough mare (GB)	Jenny Mole; 1787	Prince Tquassaw mare	Sultana (Family 37)

== See also ==
- Repeat winners of horse races
