= Reveller =

British-bred Thoroughbred racehorse

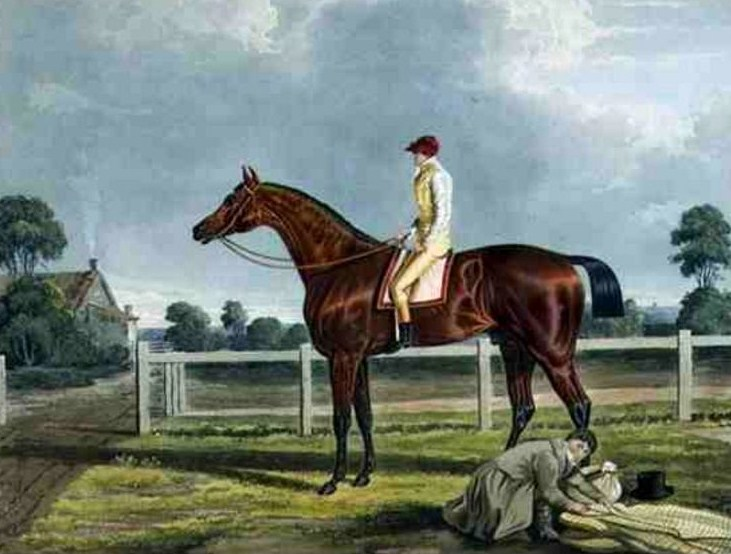
- Reveller, by John Frederick Herring, Sr.
- Sire: Comus
- Grandsire: Sorcerer
- Dam: Rosette
- Damsire: Beningbrough
- Sex: Stallion
- Foaled: 1815
- Country: United Kingdom
- Colour: Bay
- Breeder: Mr Shard
- Owner: Henry Peirse of Bedale
- Trainer: John Lonsdale
- Record: 17: 14-3-0

Major wins
- St. Leger Stakes (1818); Gascoigne Stakes (1818); 4yo Great Subscription Purse (1819); Doncaster Stakes (1819); 5yo+ Great Subscription Purse (1820, 1821); Lancaster Gold Cup (1821, 1822); Lincoln Gold Cup (1821); Preston Gold Cup (1822, 1823)

Reveller was a British Thoroughbred racehorse and sire. His most significant win came in the 1818 St Leger Stakes, but he remained in training until 1823, winning numerous races in the North of England. He had a long rivalry with another northern champion, Doctor Syntax.

== Background ==
Reveller was a strongly-built bay horse bred by a Mr Shard. As a yearling he was sold to Henry Peirse of Bedale, who owned him throughout his racing career. He was sired by Comus, a horse who finished third in the Epsom Derby before becoming a successful stallion based near Wetherby in Yorkshire. Among his other progeny were the 2000 Guineas winner Grey Momus and the St Leger winning filly Matilda. He was also the male-line ancestor of the Triple Crown winner West Australian. Reveller's dam Rosette won seven races for Peirse, who owned and bred her. She was killed in 1816 when Reveller was a yearling after receiving a kick from Jack Spigot's dam, a blind mare.

== Racing career ==
Reveller began his racing career in August 1818 at York where he won a six runner Produce Stakes. At Doncaster, he started at odds of 4/1 in a field of 21 runners for the "Great St Leger". He won the race from his stable companion Ranter, with The Marshall in third. The first three horses were all sired by Comus. Later in the same week Reveller walked over for the Gascoigne Stakes, when all of his rivals were withdrawn by their owners.

Reveller retained his unbeaten record throughout 1819, when he won all four of his races. At York in August he won a Produce Sweepstakes and the Great Subscription Purse for four-year-olds. He returned to Doncaster for the St Leger meeting where he won a Produce Sweepstakes and the four mile Doncaster Stakes. In 1820 at York he ran in two Great Subscription Purses. He won the first of them but in the second he lost for the first time when he was defeated by Juggler.

1821 saw the beginning of the rivalry between Reveller and the ten-year-old Doctor Syntax. Racing outside Yorkshire for the first time, Reveller defeated Doctor Syntax at level weights in the three mile Lancaster Gold Cup on 4 July, but at Preston, a week later the form was reversed, Doctor Syntax defeating Reveller in the Preston Gold Cup. Reveller returned to Yorkshire to win a third Great Subscription Purse at York, but was beaten by Borodino in the Doncaster Stakes. On his final appearance of the year he won the Lincoln Gold Cup. In 1822 Reveller again beat Doctor Syntax at level weights in the Lancaster Gold Cup on 2 July, but in this season he was able to confirm the form by beating his eleven-year-old rival in the Preston Gold Cup on 5 September. Doctor Syntax, who had won the race for the previous seven years finished second with the 1821 St Leger winner Jack Spigot, carrying a stone less than his veteran rivals, in third. On his final racecourse appearance on 9 July 1823, Reveller returned to Preston and claimed a walkover victory in the Gold Cup.

== Stud record ==
Reveller was retired to stud where he became a successful sire or winners. His best progeny included the Ascot Gold Cup winner Lucetta and the 1000 Guineas winner Galantine. He was also the broodmare sire of the dual Ascot Gold Cup winner The Emperor.

== Tribute ==
A pub in the village of Yafforth in North Yorkshire was named after the horse. The pub closed in the late 1990s but a nearby street is named Revellers Mews.

It is a widely held belief that Reveller is buried beneath the 15th tee at Bedale Golf Club. The land on which the golf course sits was the estate of the Peirse family. The hole is named Reveller in honour of the horse.

== Pedigree ==
Pedigree of Reveller (GB), bay stallion, 1815
Sire Comus (GB) 1809	Sorcerer; 1796	Trumpator	Conductor
Sire Comus (GB) 1809	Sorcerer; 1796	Trumpator	Brunette
Sire Comus (GB) 1809	Sorcerer; 1796	Young Giantess	Diomed
Sire Comus (GB) 1809	Sorcerer; 1796	Young Giantess	Giantess
Sire Comus (GB) 1809	Houghton Lass; 1801	Sir Peter Teazle	Highflyer
Sire Comus (GB) 1809	Houghton Lass; 1801	Sir Peter Teazle	Papillon
Sire Comus (GB) 1809	Houghton Lass; 1801	Alexina	King Fergus*
Sire Comus (GB) 1809	Houghton Lass; 1801	Alexina	Lardella
Dam Rosette (GB) 1803	Beningbrough; 1791	King Fergus*	Eclipse
Dam Rosette (GB) 1803	Beningbrough; 1791	King Fergus*	Creeping Polly
Dam Rosette (GB) 1803	Beningbrough; 1791	Fenwick's Herod Mare	Herod*
Dam Rosette (GB) 1803	Beningbrough; 1791	Fenwick's Herod Mare	Pyrrha
Dam Rosette (GB) 1803	Rosamond; 1788	Tandem	Syphon
Dam Rosette (GB) 1803	Rosamond; 1788	Tandem	Regulus mare
Dam Rosette (GB) 1803	Rosamond; 1788	Tuberose	Herod*
Dam Rosette (GB) 1803	Rosamond; 1788	Tuberose	Grey Starling (Family:19)

* Reveller is inbred 4S × 3D to the stallion King Fergus, meaning that he appears fourth generation on the sire side of his pedigree and third generation on the dam side of his pedigree.

* Reveller is inbred 4D x 4D to the stallion Herod, meaning that he appears twice fourth generation on the dam side of his pedigree.
