= Filho da Puta =

British-bred Thoroughbred racehorse

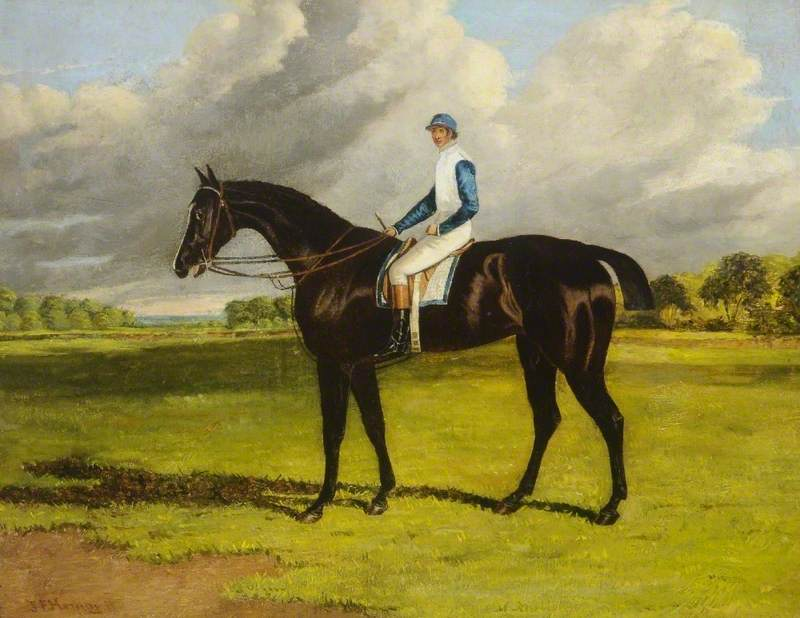
- Filho da Puta by John Frederick Herring
- Sire: Haphazard
- Grandsire: Sir Peter Teazle
- Dam: Mrs Barnet
- Damsire: Waxy
- Sex: Stallion
- Foaled: 14 April 1812
- Died: 25 August 1835 (aged 23)
- Country: Great Britain
- Colour: Bay
- Breeder: T. Hornby
- Owner: Sir William Maxwell; T. Houldsworth
- Record: 13: 9-3-1
- Earnings: £2,717

Major wins
- St. Leger Stakes (1815); Doncaster Club Stakes (1815); Richmond Cup (1815); Doncaster Gold Cup (1816); Dundas Stakes (1816)

Awards
- Leading sire in Great Britain and Ireland (1828)

Filho da Puta (14 April 1812 – 25 August 1835) was a British Thoroughbred racehorse. He won nine of his 12 races including the St. Leger Stakes and Doncaster Gold Cup. He also sired St. Leger winner Birmingham and was the leading sire in Great Britain and Ireland in 1828. He was owned by Sir William Maxwell and later T. Houldsworth. His name means "son of a bitch" in Portuguese.

The name "Filho da Puta" originated from the irritation of Sir William Barnett, owner of the Haras where the animal was born, who, when the foal was born, had learned that his wife had been disloyal. Sir William, who had lived in Portugal and knew the Portuguese language well, in a fit of anger gave this name to the future champion.

Filho da Puta was painted in oil on canvas by a famous English painter John Frederick Herring in 1815. He is exhibited at the Doncaster Museum Service (England). The painting measures 34.5 x 45 cm and was purchased by the museum in 1958.

== Background ==
Filho da Puta was a bay horse with a white snip and a star foaled on 14 April 1812 and bred by T. Hornby. He was sired by Haphazard, who won three Great Subscription Purses. As a stallion Haphazard also produced 2000 Guineas winners Antar and Reginald, 1000 Guineas winner Rowena and Doncaster Cup winner Figaro. Filho da Puta's dam was Mrs Barnet, a daughter of Waxy. He was purchased by Sir William Maxwell as a foal.

== Racing career ==
=== 1814: Two-year-old season ===
Filho da Puta started his racing career on 21 June 1814 by walking over for the Tyro Stakes at Newcastle. In September he beat Agapanthus and a filly by Clinker to win a Sweepstakes of 20 guineas each over the last mile of the Pontefract course. These were his only two races as a two-year-old.

=== 1815: Three-year-old season ===
Filho da Puta returned to the track as a three-year-old at the end of March, when he won a Sweepstakes of 100 guineas each at Catterick Bridge. Restoration finished second and a filly by Shuttle was last of the three runners in the one and half mile race. In the Autumn he won the St. Leger Stakes at Doncaster Racecourse, beating fourteen rivals. Earl Fitzwilliam's Orville colt finished second, with Fulford third and Shepherd fourth. Three days later he beat two opponents to win the Doncaster Club Stakes over two miles. He was then bought for 3,000 guineas by T. Houldsworth and in his final race of the season he won the four-mile Richmond Cup. He beat Doctor Syntax into second place, with the Luck's All gelding finishing third of the ten runners. Filho da Puta had started the race as the 1/3 favourite.

=== 1816: Four-year-old season ===
In April Filho da Puta was beaten for the first time in his career when he lost to Sir Joshua in a 1000 guineas match race over one mile at Newmarket. In the summer he was beaten by Doctor Syntax in the Preston Gold Cup, before returning to Doncaster in October, where he four horses in a Sweepstakes of 50 guineas each over the St. Leger course. Later in the day he started as the odds-on favourite for the Gold Cup over four miles. He won the race from Leopold. At Richmond he beat Rasping and Clinkerina to win the Dundas Stakes. Later in the day he could only finish third behind Leopold and The Duchess in the Gold Cup.

=== 1817-18: Injury and final race ===
Filho da Puta never raced in 1817 due to a leg injury, but he was kept in training. His final race came in 1818 when after starting as the heavy favourite, he was beaten by Cerberus in a match race over two miles at York. After York he was retired to stud.

== Stud career ==
Filho da Puta initially stood at Farnsfield in Nottinghamshire for Houldsworth at a fee of 10 guineas and half a guinea for the groom. He became a successful stallion and was the leading sire in Great Britain and Ireland in 1828. His son Birmingham won the St. Leger in 1830. He died at Rock Hill Paddocks near Mansfield on 25 August 1835.

== Sire line tree ==
- Filho da Puta
  - Dr Faustus
    - Chandler
    - Tupsley
      - The Huntsman
  - Hedgeford
    - Denmark
      - Gaines' Denmark
        - Washington Denmark
        - Star Denmark
        - Diamond Denmark
        - Lail's Denmark Chief
        - Sumpter Denmark
      - Muir's Denmark
      - Rob Roy
  - Birmingham
  - Philip
  - Colwick
    - Attila
      - Saint Germain

== Pedigree ==
Pedigree of Filho da Puta, bay stallion, 1812
Sire Haphazard (GB) br. 1797	Sir Peter Teazle (GB) br. 1784	Highflyer; 1774	Herod*
Sire Haphazard (GB) br. 1797	Sir Peter Teazle (GB) br. 1784	Highflyer; 1774	Rachel
Sire Haphazard (GB) br. 1797	Sir Peter Teazle (GB) br. 1784	Papillon; 1769	Snap
Sire Haphazard (GB) br. 1797	Sir Peter Teazle (GB) br. 1784	Papillon; 1769	Miss Cleveland
Sire Haphazard (GB) br. 1797	Miss Hervey (GB) ch. 1775	Eclipse* ch. 1764	Marske
Sire Haphazard (GB) br. 1797	Miss Hervey (GB) ch. 1775	Eclipse* ch. 1764	Spilletta
Sire Haphazard (GB) br. 1797	Miss Hervey (GB) ch. 1775	Clio; 1760	Young Cade
Sire Haphazard (GB) br. 1797	Miss Hervey (GB) ch. 1775	Clio; 1760	Starling mare
Dam Mrs Barnet (GB) b. 1806	Waxy (GB) b. 1790	Potoooooooo; 1773	Eclipse*
Dam Mrs Barnet (GB) b. 1806	Waxy (GB) b. 1790	Potoooooooo; 1773	Sportsmistress
Dam Mrs Barnet (GB) b. 1806	Waxy (GB) b. 1790	Maria b. 1777	Herod*
Dam Mrs Barnet (GB) b. 1806	Waxy (GB) b. 1790	Maria b. 1777	Lisette
Dam Mrs Barnet (GB) b. 1806	Woodpecker mare (GB) b. 1788	Woodpecker ch. 1773	Herod*
Dam Mrs Barnet (GB) b. 1806	Woodpecker mare (GB) b. 1788	Woodpecker ch. 1773	Miss Ramsden
Dam Mrs Barnet (GB) b. 1806	Woodpecker mare (GB) b. 1788	Heinel; 1771	Squirrel
Dam Mrs Barnet (GB) b. 1806	Woodpecker mare (GB) b. 1788	Heinel; 1771	Principessa

Note: b. = Bay, br. = Brown, ch. = Chestnut

* Filho da Puta is inbred 3S x 4D to the stallion Eclipse, meaning that he appears third generation on the sire side of his pedigree and fourth generation on the dam side of his pedigree.

* Filho da Puta is inbred 4S x 4D x 4D to the stallion Herod, meaning that he appears fourth generation once on the sire side of his pedigree and fourth generation twice on the dam side of his pedigree.

== See also ==
- Citation (horse)
