= Beechwold Chester =

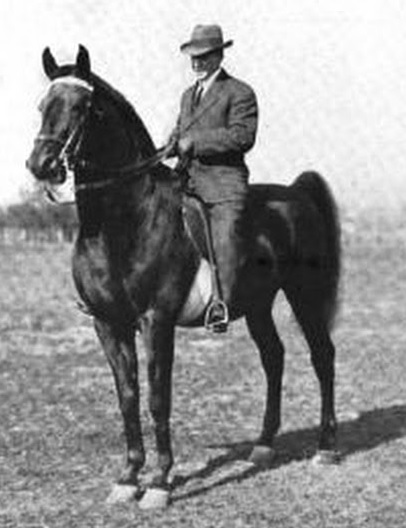
Beechwold Chester pictured with rider

Beechwold Chester (foaled 1906) was a stallion owned by the United States Army Remount for breeding purposes.

Beechwold Chester was an American Saddlebred descended from Denmark. He was foaled in 1906 by Molly Nicoll, and sired by Happy Dare II.

In adulthood, Beechwold Chester stood 16 hands (64 inches, 163 cm) tall and weighed 1,150 pounds.

From 1913 to 1917 Beechwold Chester was posted to Leitchfield, Kentucky. There, he earned a solid reputation as a sire and was featured in a number of articles in horse enthusiast publications. He was attributed in one report as "perhaps the best type of Denmark in Kentucky" during the late 1910s.

== See also ==
- United States Cavalry
