= Attila (horse) =

British-bred Thoroughbred racehorse

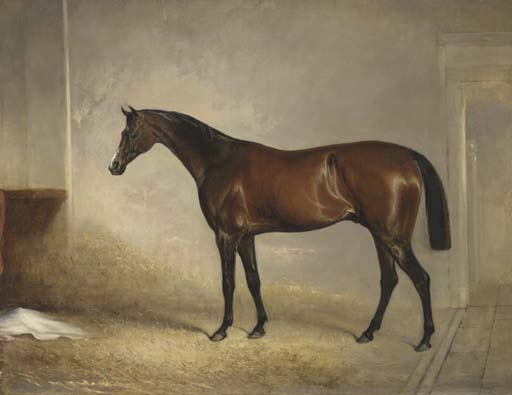
- Attila, by John Ferneley
- Sire: Colwick
- Grandsire: Filho da Puta
- Dam: Progress
- Damsire: Langar
- Sex: Stallion
- Foaled: 1839
- Country: United Kingdom of Great Britain and Ireland
- Colour: Bay or brown
- Breeder: Colonel Hancox
- Owner: George Anson
- Trainer: John Scott
- Record: 13:8-1-1

Major wins
- Epsom Derby (1842); Port Stakes (1843)

Attila (1839–1846) was a British Thoroughbred racehorse and sire. In a career that lasted from August 1841 to June 1844 he ran thirteen times and won eight races. He began his career with a run of six successive wins, culminating in the 1843 Derby. His later form was disappointing and he never won another competitive race: his two subsequent "victories" were the result of walkovers in races in which he was unopposed. He had little chance to prove himself as a stallion as he died at the age of seven from injuries sustained in an accident on board a ship in the English Channel.

== Background ==
Attila was a small, but strongly built colt of a rich bay or brown colour with a white blaze. He was described as good-tempered horse with a "peculiar, Arab-looking head" but "excellent loins" and "very fine quarters". Attila was bred by Colonel Hancox, who owned him as a yearling before the colt was acquired by Colonel George Anson, who accepted him in payment of a debt of £220 or £140 ($34.8k or $22.1k in modern dollars, respectively). Anson sent Attila into training with John Scott who trained forty classic winners at his base at Whitewall stables, Malton, North Yorkshire.

Attila's sire, Colwick, a descendant of Sir Peter Teazle, was a successful but unexceptional racehorse who had stood at a fee of 10 guineas at Bonehill Farm near Fazeley in Staffordshire, as well as covering mares for Lord Exeter at Burleigh, although his fee doubled after Attila's successes. He was known for siring both racehorses and hunters. Attila's dam, Progress, was a sister to Miss Cobden, who produced the Grand National winner Freetrader. According to "Sylvanus", writing in Bentley's Miscellany, Attila had a distinctive habit of racing with his head "remarkably low".

== Racing career ==
=== 1841: two-year-old season ===
Attila was one of the best two-year-olds of his generation, being unbeaten in four races. He made his debut by running in the Champagne Stakes at the Pottery Meeting on 3 August, where he started the 6/4 favourite and won from Gipsy Queen. He was sent to Doncaster races, where he ran twice. On 13 September, he led all the way to beat Cabrera by "half a neck" in the Champagne Stakes, a race which required the winning owner to give six dozen bottles of champagne to the Doncaster Racing Club. Three days later, Attila repeated his performance by leading from the start and winning the Two Year Old Stakes in a canter from Sally, a good filly who went on to win the Park Hill Stakes. At Newmarket on 12 October he won the Clearwell Stakes, beating the favourite Wiseacre by a length "with all ease". His performances were enough for him to go into the winter break as one of the favourites for the following year's Derby

=== 1842: three-year-old season ===
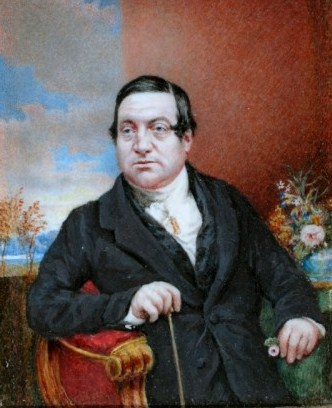
Attila's Derby was one of forty classic wins for John Scott

Attila remained among the leading fancies for the Derby in the early part of 1842: on 25 March he was offered at odds of 7/1. He made his first appearance of the year in a one-mile Sweepstakes at Newmarket's first spring meeting, where he won very easily by at least six lengths from Palladium and Devil-among-the-Tailors.

In the Derby on 25 May, Attila started the 5/1 second choice in the betting behind the 3/1 favourite Coldrenick (previously known as "the Frederica colt"), a "dark horse" who carried the confidence and money of John Day's Danebury stable. The weather was fine and the usual huge crowd was in attendance, although there was some disappointment at the lack of any Royal presence. When the race got under way after several false starts and delays, Attila, ridden by his trainer's brother, Bill Scott, made a fast start. He was always among the leading group in a slowly run race and moved up to dispute the lead with Belcoeur and Combermere on the turn into the straight. A furlong from the finish, Scott produced Attila with a decisive run and the colt quickly went clear to win "with the most perfect ease imaginable" by two lengths from the fast-finishing Robert de Gorham. After the race Scott expressed the view that Attila could have won the race by six lengths "if he had liked". In addition to the prize money of £4,900, Colonel Anson reportedly took £12,000 in winning bets.

On his first race after the Derby, Attila ran in the Drawing Room Stakes over two and a quarter miles at Goodwood in July. Carrying an eight pound weight penalty for winning the Derby, he ran what was considered a creditable race to finish third, beaten a length behind Envoy and Seahorse. Attila was given a particularly hard ride by Bill Scott in this race and the colt was never as good again.

Despite his defeat at Goodwood, Attila started 11/8 favourite for the St Leger at Doncaster on 13 September. On this occasion, Bill Scott attempted to lead from the start and set a strong pace, but Attila began to weaken before the horses entered the straight and was soon beaten. He finished eighth of the seventeen starters behind Blue Bonnet, a filly described in the American Turf Register and Sporting Magazine as "a very inferior animal". Two days later Attila ran again in the Doncaster Cup against older horses over two and a half miles. He finished last of the four runners behind Beeswing, Charles XII and The Shadow. Later that afternoon he was allowed to walk over for the Gascoigne Stakes over the St Leger course and distance.

=== 1843: four-year-old season ===
Attila reappeared as a four-year-old in the Port Stakes, a race for four-year-olds at the Newmarket Craven meeting in April. He took the prize without having to run, as the other entrants were withdrawn and he was allowed to walk over. He did not appear on a racecourse again in 1843.

=== 1844: five-year-old season ===
After an absence of fourteen months, Attila returned for the Royal Ascot meeting in June 1844 where he ran twice. In the Royal Hunt Cup, a one-mile handicap race, he finished second to The Bishop of Romford's Cob, with the two finishing well clear of the other runners. The following day he ran in the Gold Cup but was never in contention at any stage and finished unplaced behind The Emperor (at that time running as an unnamed "colt by Defence"). He never ran again and was retired to stud.

== Stud career ==
After a single season of retirement in England Attila was leased to Auguste Lupin and spent the 1846 season covering mares in France. The ship returning him to England encountered rough seas and Attila panicked, kicking his stall to pieces and sustaining serious injuries. He was taken ashore at London, but died shortly afterwards at Tattersalls, Hyde Park Corner. His only crop of French foals included the colts Saint Germain and Babiega, who finished first and second in the 1850 Prix du Jockey Club and the filly Fleur de Marie who won the Prix de Diane in the same year.

== Pedigree ==
Pedigree of Attila (GB), bay or brown stallion, 1839
Sire Colwick (GB) 1828	Filho da Puta; 1812	Haphazard	Sir Peter Teazle*
Sire Colwick (GB) 1828	Filho da Puta; 1812	Haphazard	Miss Hervey
Sire Colwick (GB) 1828	Filho da Puta; 1812	Mrs Barnet	Waxy
Sire Colwick (GB) 1828	Filho da Puta; 1812	Mrs Barnet	Woodpecker mare
Sire Colwick (GB) 1828	Stella; 1808	Sir Oliver	Sir Peter Teazle*
Sire Colwick (GB) 1828	Stella; 1808	Sir Oliver	Fanny
Sire Colwick (GB) 1828	Stella; 1808	Scotilla	Anvil
Sire Colwick (GB) 1828	Stella; 1808	Scotilla	Scota
Dam Progress (GB) 1833	Langar; 1817	Selim	Buzzard
Dam Progress (GB) 1833	Langar; 1817	Selim	Alexander mare
Dam Progress (GB) 1833	Langar; 1817	Walton mare	Walton^
Dam Progress (GB) 1833	Langar; 1817	Walton mare	Young Giantess
Dam Progress (GB) 1833	Blacklock mare	Blacklock	Whitelock
Dam Progress (GB) 1833	Blacklock mare	Blacklock	Coriander mare
Dam Progress (GB) 1833	Blacklock mare	Knowsley mare	Knowsley^
Dam Progress (GB) 1833	Blacklock mare	Knowsley mare	Tartar mare (Family:15)

*^ Attila is inbred 4S x 4S x 5D x 5D to the stallion Sir Peter Teazle, meaning that he appears fourth generation twice on the sire side of his pedigree and fifth generation twice (via Walton and Knowsley) on the dam side of his pedigree.
