= Prince Leopold (horse) =

British Thoroughbred racehorse

- Circa 1816 wax diorama of Prince Leopold by an unknown artist
- Sire: Hedley
- Grandsire: Gohanna
- Dam: Gramarie
- Damsire: Sorcerer
- Sex: Stallion (Gelded in 1817)
- Foaled: 1813
- Country: United Kingdom of Great Britain and Ireland
- Colour: Bay
- Breeder: The Duke of York
- Owner: The Duke of York
- Trainer: William Butler
- Record: 8:3-2-2 (includes one walk-over)

Major wins
- Epsom Derby (1816); Port Stakes (1817)

Prince Leopold (1813–1817) was a British Thoroughbred racehorse and winner of the 1816 Epsom Derby. Prince Leopold was bred by the Duke of York and raced as a three and four-year-old. The bay colt had an unruly temperament, and was castrated at the end of the 1817 racing season in an attempt to improve his behavior, but he died shortly after the procedure.

== Background ==
Prince Leopold was bred by the Duke of York and was foaled at the Duke's Oakland Park stud in 1813. His sire, Hedley (foaled in 1803), raced at age four and five, winning a few 100-guinea races before he retired to stud in Wingfield, Berkshire in 1809. Prince Leopold was Hedley's most notable son. Gramarie (foaled 1807), Prince Leopold's dam, was also bred by the Duke of York and produced a full-sister to Prince Leopold, Leopoldine, that became the tail-female ancestress of several French stakes winners, most notably Bois Roussel. Gramarie also produced Bella Donna, the granddam of Derby winner Amato.

== Racing career and death ==
Prince Leopold did not race as a two-year-old, and he started seven times in his three-year career with a total of two wins and one "walk over" (win by default). The colt's most important win was in the Derby, and the Duke of York won the Derby a second time in 1822 with the colt Moses. The Duke of York's racing establishment was managed by the Duke's groom, Warwick Lake, and Prince Leopold was registered under Lake's name for most of his racing engagements.

=== 1816: three-year-old season ===
The 1,575-guinea Derby was held on 30 May with 11 horses lining up for the start. The race favorite was the colt Nectar who had won the 2,000 Guineas Stakes. In the final strides of the race, Nectar and Prince Leopold battled for the win, with Prince Leopold winning by half a length. The Duke of York reportedly won several thousand pounds by betting on Prince Leopold to win the Derby.

On 1 October at the First October meeting at Newmarket, Prince Leopold was third in the St. Leger Stakes being beaten by the colts Sovereign and Sir Richard. The next day, Prince Leopold received 125 guineas after a subscription race did not attract enough entries (termed as a "walk over"). On 17 October at the Second October meeting, Prince Leopold was fourth in the second class of the October Oatlands Stakes where the winner was his sire's five-year-old full-brother Wanderer.

=== 1817: four-year-old season and death ===
At the Newmarket-Craven meeting, Prince Leopold won the Port Stakes out of a field of five horses. At the First Spring meeting at Newmarket, Prince Leopold was beaten by Mr. Wyndham's colt Skim in a match race. On 5 May at Newmarket, Nectar beat Prince Leopold in a match race, and he finished third in a 150-guinea sweepstakes race at the same meeting a few days later.

Towards the end of the 1817 racing season, Prince Leopold's "temper being so bad they could do nothing with him," the decision was made to castrate him. The General Stud Book reports that Prince Leopold died after the operation in 1817, but the Sporting Magazine lists his death year as 1818. The 1817 Racing Calendar reports that Lord Stawell's horse Pandour received a forfeit from Prince Leopold (listed as dead) on 29 September 1817, making the 1817 death date more likely.

== Pedigree ==
Pedigree of Prince Leopold (GB), Bay colt, 1813
Sire Hedley (GB) Bay, 1803	Gohanna; 1790	Mercury	Eclipse
Sire Hedley (GB) Bay, 1803	Gohanna; 1790	Mercury	Tartar Mare
Sire Hedley (GB) Bay, 1803	Gohanna; 1790	Dundas Herod Mare	Herod*
Sire Hedley (GB) Bay, 1803	Gohanna; 1790	Dundas Herod Mare	Maiden
Sire Hedley (GB) Bay, 1803	Catherine; 1795	Woodpecker	Herod*
Sire Hedley (GB) Bay, 1803	Catherine; 1795	Woodpecker	Miss Ramsden
Sire Hedley (GB) Bay, 1803	Catherine; 1795	Camilla	Trentham
Sire Hedley (GB) Bay, 1803	Catherine; 1795	Camilla	Coquette
Dam Gramarie (GB) Black, 1807	Sorcerer; 1796	Trumpator	Conductor
Dam Gramarie (GB) Black, 1807	Sorcerer; 1796	Trumpator	Brunette
Dam Gramarie (GB) Black, 1807	Sorcerer; 1796	Young Giantess	Diomed^
Dam Gramarie (GB) Black, 1807	Sorcerer; 1796	Young Giantess	Giantess
Dam Gramarie (GB) Black, 1807	Sir Peter Mare; 1802	Sir Peter Teazle	Highflyer^
Dam Gramarie (GB) Black, 1807	Sir Peter Mare; 1802	Sir Peter Teazle	Papillon
Dam Gramarie (GB) Black, 1807	Sir Peter Mare; 1802	Deceit	Tandem
Dam Gramarie (GB) Black, 1807	Sir Peter Mare; 1802	Deceit	Perdita^

*^ Prince Leopold is inbred 4S x 4S x 5D x 6D x 5D to the stallion Herod, meaning that he appears fourth generation twice on the sire side of his pedigree and fifth generation twice (via Highflyer and Perdita)^ and sixth generation once (via Diomed)^ on the dam side of his pedigree.
