= Port Stakes =

- Location: Two Middle Miles of the Beacon Course; Newmarket, England
- Race type: Flat / Thoroughbred

Race information
- Distance: 1 mile 7 furlongs 127 yards (3134 metres)
- Surface: Turf
- Qualification: Four-year-olds

The Port Stakes was a flat horse race in Great Britain open to four-year-olds. It was run on the Two Middle Miles (T.M.M.) of the Beacon course at Newmarket over a distance of 2 miles, and was scheduled to take place each year in early or mid April at the Craven meeting. The Two Middle Miles course was relatively flat and was considered less testing then the "Ditch-In" course, over which the similar Claret Stakes was run.

The race often attracted winners of the previous seasons British Classic Races: classic winners who went on to win the Port Stakes included Whisker, Prince Leopold, Mameluke, Green Mantle, Priam, Galata, Grey Momus, Ralph and Attila.

== Winners 1815–1843 ==
| Year | Winner | Jockey | Trainer | Owner | Odds |
|---|---|---|---|---|---|
| 1815 | Wire | | | George FitzRoy, 4th Duke of Grafton | 2/1 |
| 1816 | Whisker | | Robert Robson | George FitzRoy, 4th Duke of Grafton | 2/5 |
| 1817 | Prince Leopold | | William Butler | Mr Lake | 6/4 |
| 1818 | Gazelle | | | Mr Lake | 3/1 |
| 1819 | Merlin | | | Mr G. L. Fox | Evens |
| 1820 | Snake | | | Brownlow Cecil, 2nd Marquess of Exeter |
| 1821 | Abjer | | | John Udney | 1/2 |
| 1822 | Zeal | | Robert Robson | George FitzRoy, 4th Duke of Grafton | walkover |
| 1823 | No race |
| 1824 | No race |
| 1825 | Serab | William Arnull | | Stanlake Batson | 11/8 |
| 1826 | Camel | William Arnull | | Charles Wyndham | 7/4 |
| 1827 | Lamplighter | Frank Buckle | | Col Wilson | 7/4 |
| 1828 | Mameluke | | | John Gully |
| 1829 | Privateer | William Arnull | | George Payne | 6/5 |
| 1830 | Green Mantle | Patrick Conolly | Charles Marson | Brownlow Cecil, 2nd Marquess of Exeter |
| 1831 | Priam | Jem Robinson | William Chifney | William Chifney | 1/3 |
| 1832 | Liverpool | William Scott | | Mr Robinson | 2/1 |
| 1833 | Galata | Samuel Darling | Charles Marson | Brownlow Cecil, 2nd Marquess of Exeter | 7/2 |
| 1834 | Muley Moloch | Samuel Chifney Jr. | | William Vane, 1st Duke of Cleveland | 5/2 |
| 1835 | Plenipotentiary | | | Stanlake Batson | walkover |
| 1836 | Elizondo | Boyce | | Charles Gordon-Lennox, 5th Duke of Richmond | 5/2 |
| 1837 | Scroggins | William Scott | | George Stanhope, 6th Earl of Chesterfield | 1/5 |
| 1838 | Rat-Trap | Jem Robinson | | John Manners, 5th Duke of Rutland | 10/1 |
| 1839 | Grey Momus | John Barham Day | John Barham Day | Lord George Bentinck |
| 1840 | Domino | W. Cotton | | William Keppel, 4th Earl of Albemarle | 3/1 |
| 1841 | Gibraltar | Nat Flatman | | General Yates | 5/4 |
| 1842 | Ralph | | W. Edwards | William Keppel, 4th Earl of Albemarle | walkover |
| 1843 | Attila | | John Scott | George Anson | walkover |
