= John Frederick Herring Jr. =

English painter

- Born: 1815 or 1820; Doncaster, England
- Died: 9 March 1907 at his residence The Poplars Fulbourn, Great Wilbraham, Cambridgeshire England
- Occupation: Painter
- Spouse: Emma Jane Dawson married 29 August 1836
- Parent: John Frederick Herring Sr.

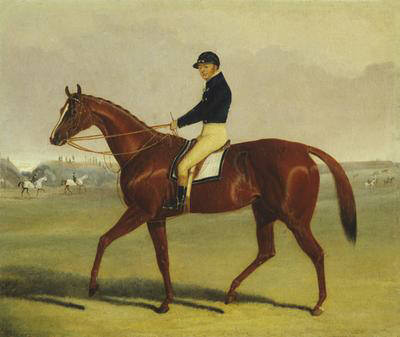
Preserve with jockey Nat Flatman at Newmarket Racecourse (1835)

John Frederick Herring Jr. (1820–1907) was an English painter who is best known for his equine art.

== Life and work ==
John F. Herring Jr. was born in Doncaster, then in the West Riding of Yorkshire c.1820, to the well-known 19th-century artist John Frederick Herring Sr. (1795–1865), who at the time was considered one of England's great sporting and equestrian artists, patronized by the English aristocracy. The father's mastery of the brush, and popularity with the nobility, served his son, Herring Jr., well. Early on, Herring Jr. was exposed to fine painting and wealthy patrons.

Recent reference books state that Herring Sr.'s first child was named "John Frederick Herring Jr." and was born on 21 June 1815, later baptized on 22 October 1815. However, another child was born in 1820 and also named "John Frederick Herring Jr." (baptized in 1821). The assumption is that the first Herring child died and the second, born in 1820, is the artist we know of today.

Herring developed a love for painting, a passion his brothers Charles and Benjamin shared. Three of the four brothers became artists, painting in the same style as their father, often collaborating on a single painting.

In the years after 1836, Herring Sr., feeling threatened by the teenage Herring's ability and growing popularity, began incorporating the tag "SR" at the end of his signature.

Herring continued painting, in the tradition of his father, the sporting and animal pictures; however, as his artistic prowess improved, his style changed: he loosened his brushwork and widened his landscape views. The placement of farm animals along the banks of a stream or within a farmyard were characteristic of Herring's work.

Both John Herring Snr and John Herring Jnr were the subject of an episode of Minder when Arthur Daley attempts to sell a counterfeit painting to an art dealer.

== See also ==
- George Stubbs – another English horse painter
