= Denmark (horse) =

American horse (born 1839)

- Breed: Thoroughbred
- Sire: Hedgeford
- Sex: Stallion
- Foaled: 1839
- Country: United States
- Color: Brown

Denmark (foaled 1839) was Thoroughbred stallion who became a major foundation sire of the American Saddlebred horse breed. Over 60% of all the horses in the first three volumes of the Saddlebred studbook trace back to Denmark.

== Life ==
Denmark was a brown Thoroughbred stallion foaled in Kentucky in 1839, sired by an imported Thoroughbred named Hedgeford. He sired the stallion Gaines' Denmark, who became an influential sire. Denmark was used as a cavalry horse in the American Civil War.

== Influence ==
When the National Saddle Horse Breeders' Association, precursor to the American Saddlebred Horse Association, was founded in 1891, Denmark was named as one of 17 foundation sires. Sixty percent of the horses in the first three volumes of the registry traced to him. In 1908, the directors of the National Saddle Horse Breeders' Association voted to make Denmark the sole foundation sire, although Harrison Chief was included as an additional foundation sire for the breed in 1991. For over 150 years, the Denmark bloodline was the best-known within the Saddlebred breed, and Saddlebreds were sometimes referred to as "Denmarks".

== Sire line tree ==
- Denmark
  - Gaines' Denmark
    - Washington Denmark
      - King William
        - Black Eagle
      - Cromwell
        - Washington
      - Jewel Denmark
        - Beau Brummel of Kenmore
    - Star Denmark
    - Diamond Denmark
      - Montrose
        - Moss Rose
        - King Lee Rose
    - Lail's Denmark Chief
      - Crigler's Denmark
        - Rex Denmark
    - Sumpter Denmark
  - Muir's Denmark
  - Rob Roy

== Pedigree ==
Pedigree of Denmark, brown stallion, 1839
Sire Hedgeford (GB) br. 1825	Filho da Puta (GB) br. 1812	Haphazard; 1797	Sir Peter Teazle^
Sire Hedgeford (GB) br. 1825	Filho da Puta (GB) br. 1812	Haphazard; 1797	Miss Hervey
Sire Hedgeford (GB) br. 1825	Filho da Puta (GB) br. 1812	Mrs Barnet; 1806	Waxy
Sire Hedgeford (GB) br. 1825	Filho da Puta (GB) br. 1812	Mrs Barnet; 1806	Woodpecker mare
Sire Hedgeford (GB) br. 1825	Miss Craigie (GB) b. 1811	Orville; 1799	Beningbrough
Sire Hedgeford (GB) br. 1825	Miss Craigie (GB) b. 1811	Orville; 1799	Evelina
Sire Hedgeford (GB) br. 1825	Miss Craigie (GB) b. 1811	Marchioness; 1797	Lurcher
Sire Hedgeford (GB) br. 1825	Miss Craigie (GB) b. 1811	Marchioness; 1797	Miss Cogden
Dam Betsy Harrison (USA) b. 1828	Aratus (USA) b. 1820	Director; 1811	Sir Archy^
Dam Betsy Harrison (USA) b. 1828	Aratus (USA) b. 1820	Director; 1811	Meretrix
Dam Betsy Harrison (USA) b. 1828	Aratus (USA) b. 1820	Betsy Haxall; 18??	Sir Harry^
Dam Betsy Harrison (USA) b. 1828	Aratus (USA) b. 1820	Betsy Haxall; 18??	Saltram mare*
Dam Betsy Harrison (USA) b. 1828	Jenny Cockracy (USA) ch. 1813	Potomac; 1803	Diomed^
Dam Betsy Harrison (USA) b. 1828	Jenny Cockracy (USA) ch. 1813	Potomac; 1803	Fairy
Dam Betsy Harrison (USA) b. 1828	Jenny Cockracy (USA) ch. 1813	Saltram mare* 1799	Saltram
Dam Betsy Harrison (USA) b. 1828	Jenny Cockracy (USA) ch. 1813	Saltram mare* 1799	Wildair mare

Note: b. = Bay, br. = Brown, ch. = Chestnut

* Denmark is inbred 4D x 3D to the mare Saltram mare, meaning that she appears fourth and third generation on the dam side of his pedigree.

^ Denmark is inbred 4S x 5D to the stallion Sir Peter Teazle, meaning that he appears fourth generation on the sire side of his pedigree and fifth generation (via Sir Harry) on the dam side of his pedigree.

^ Denmark is inbred 5D x 4D to the stallion Diomed, meaning that he appears fifth generation (via Sir Archy) and fourth generation on the dam side of his pedigree.
