= Grey Momus =

British-bred Thoroughbred racehorse

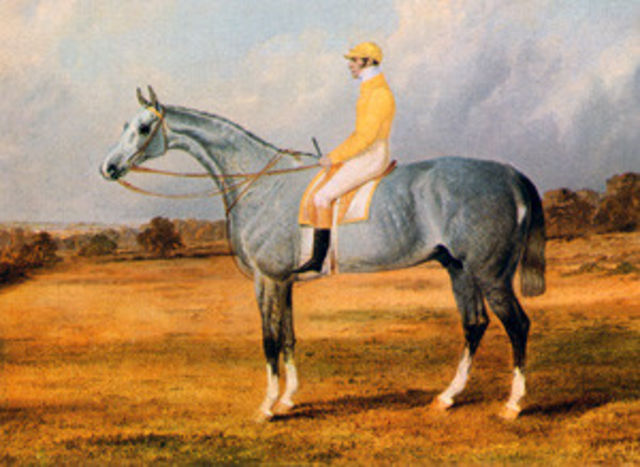
- Grey Momus, by an unknown artist.
- Sire: Comus
- Grandsire: Sorcerer
- Dam: Cervantes mare
- Damsire: Cervantes
- Sex: Stallion
- Foaled: 1835
- Country: United Kingdom
- Colour: Grey
- Breeder: Sir Tatton Sykes
- Owner: John Bowes; Lord George Bentinck
- Trainer: John Barham Day
- Earnings: 21:14-3-2

Major wins
- Lavant Stakes (1837); Molecomb Stakes (1837); 2000 Guineas (1838); Ascot Gold Cup (1838); Grand Duke Michael Stakes (1838); Port Stakes (1839)

Grey Momus (1835 – 1856) was a British Thoroughbred racehorse and sire. In a career that lasted from August 1837 to 1839 he competed twenty-one times and won fourteen races. Grey Momus first attracted attention as a two-year-old when he recorded two impressive victories at Goodwood in August. In the following year he won seven times from nine starts, taking two of the year's biggest races, the 2000 Guineas at Newmarket and the Gold Cup at Ascot. Grey Momus won one competitive race and took three walkovers in 1839 before being retired. He was exported to stand as a stallion in Germany, where he had some success as a sire of winners.

== Background ==
Grey Momus was strongly-built, heavy-shouldered grey horse, bred at Sledmere Stud in Yorkshire by Sir Tatton Sykes, 4th Baronet. He was sired by Comus, who finished third in the 1812 Epsom Derby before becoming a successful sire of winners. His dam, an unnamed mare by Cervantes, also produced a mare who became the ancestor of the Thoroughbred family known as 2-e, which produced such horses as Reigh Count, Candy Spots and Granville.

Before he appeared on the racecourse, Grey Momus had been bought at Doncaster by John Bowes. The colt was sent into training with John Barham Day at Danebury near Stockbridge in Hampshire. Day also rode the grey in most of his races.

== Racing career ==
=== 1837: two-year-old season ===
Grey Momus raced six times as a two-year-old in 1837. He made his debut Goodwood in the four furlong Lavant Stakes on 2 August. Ridden by his trainer John Day, he started favourite at odds of 1/2 and won "without any difficulty" by half a length from Kirtle, Anchorite and two others. Two days later at the same course he carried top weight of 124 pounds to victory in the Molecomb Stakes at odds of 4/7. His victories seemed to establish Grey Momus as the leading colt of his generation, and he was an early favourite for the following year's Derby.

After a break of two months, Grey Momus reappeared in the Hopeful Stakes at Newmarket on 3 October for which he started 4/7 favourite despite carrying top weight. He started badly and was left with a great deal of ground to make up before finishing strongly to take second place behind the 15/1 outsider Saintfoin. At the next Newmarket meeting two weeks later he finished unplaced behind Ion when favourite for the Clearwell Stakes. At the Newmarket Houghton meeting on 30 October, Grey Momus was pitted against Colonel Peel's four-year-old filly Vulture, over five furlongs in a match which was highly anticipated. The match, which attracted keen betting interest, was made for £1000 with Grey Momus receiving 38 pounds from his older rival. At half way, Grey Momus seemed to be struggling, and looked likely to be easily beaten, but he stayed on strongly and was only half a length behind at the finish. Two days later at the same meeting Grey Momus was moved up in distance for one mile sweepstakes in which he prevailed by a neck from Paganini after a "desperate race".

By the end of December, Grey Momus, after his mixed results at Newmarket, was third favourite for the Derby behind D'Egville and a son of Cobweb who was later named Phoenix.

=== 1838: three-year-old season ===
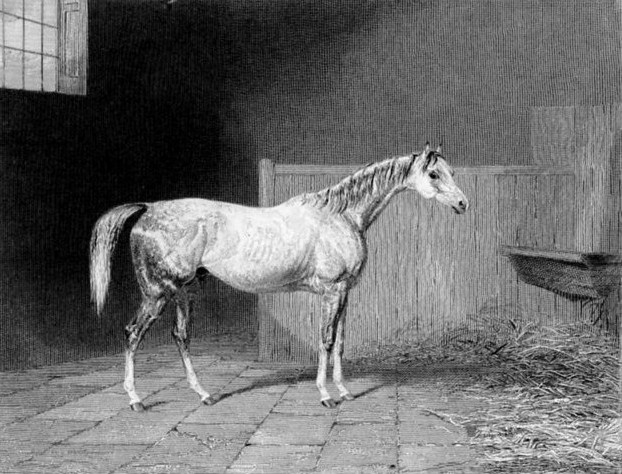
Grey Momus in his stable: contemporary engraving

Before the start of the 1838 season Grey Momus entered the ownership of Lord George Bentinck. The colt began his three-year-old season in the 2000 Guineas over the Rowley Mile course at Newmarket. Following the withdrawal of Phoenix, Grey Momus started at odds of 4/1 in a field of six runners. The grey colt was sent into the lead by John Day from the start and was never headed, winning easily by a length won from Saintfoin, with the favourite, Bamboo in third place. The supporters of the beaten favourite were dissatisfied by their horse's defeat and as a result, Grey Momus and Bamboo ran a match race at level weights over the same course and distance three days later. Grey Momus increased his superiority over his rival to win a prize of 300 sovereigns very easily by two lengths after Bamboo had led for the first half of the race.

At Epsom on 30 May he was made 5/2 favourite for the Derby in a field of twenty-three runners, with Bentinck "declaring to win" with Grey Momus in preference to his other runner D'Egville. Grey Momus started well and disputed the lead with the previously unraced outsider Amato, before beginning to struggle in the straight. Although the grey colt "strained every nerve", he finished a well-beaten third behind Amato, with Ion taking second place. Two weeks after his defeat in the Derby, Grey Momus was sent to Ascot where he ran against older horses in the Gold Cup over a distance of two and a half miles. He started favourite at odds of 4/5 and took the race from the four-year-olds Epirus and Caravan. A year after his first appearance, Grey Momus returned to Goodwood on 31 July and won the Drawing Room Stakes from three opponents. Two days later at the same course, he won the Racing Sweepstakes over one mile from a field which included The Oaks winner Industry.

After a two-month break, Grey Momus returned to run at the autumn meetings at Newmarket. On the opening day of the First October meeting he contested the Grand Duke Michael Stakes over ten furlongs and won at odds of 1/4 from Dash, with the 1000 Guineas winner Barcarolle in third. On the following day, Grey Momus was opposed by only one horse, a colt named Quo Minus in the Newmarket St. Leger and won at odds of 1/15. On his final start of the year, Grey Momus ran a £500 match at Newmarket's Houghton meeting on 2 November, and was beaten over two miles by Caravan. This defeat confirmed the belief of some observers that the successes of Grey Momus in 1838 owed more to his connections clever selection of targets rather than any exceptional ability. Others, however, felt that Grey Momus had been unsuited by the very soft ground and had not given his true running.

=== 1839: four-year-old season ===
Grey Momus began his four-year-old campaign in the Port Stakes at Newmarket's Craven meeting on 5 April. The race attracted only three runners, but these included two Classic with Grey Momus being opposed by Don John, the John Scott-trained winner of the 1838 St Leger. The previously undefeated Yorkshire colt was strongly favoured in the betting, but Grey Momus won the two mile contest "in a canter" by two lengths. At the next meeting, Grey Momus claimed three more prizes without having to race. He was allowed to walk over in a £50 race over three miles on 15 April. He walked over again in a similar event two days later and in a Queen's Plate the following afternoon.

Grey Momus was strongly fancied to win a second Ascot Gold Cup but was forced out of the race by injury. He then finished third behind Harkaway and Caravan in the Tradesmen and Innkeepers' Cup over two and a half miles at Cheltenham on 3 July. On his final start he broke down in a race at Guildford.

== Stud career ==
Grey Momus began his stud career by returning to his breeder's Sledmere Stud. He was bought by Count Hahn of Basedow, Mecklenburg-Vorpommern and exported to Germany where he had some success as a stallion. Among his German progeny were the Henckel-Rennen winner Seal and Dolores, the winner of the Union-Rennen. Grey Momus died in 1856.

== Pedigree ==
Pedigree of Grey Momus (GB), grey stallion, 1835
Sire Comus (GB) 1809	Sorcerer; 1796	Trumpator	Conductor
Sire Comus (GB) 1809	Sorcerer; 1796	Trumpator	Brunette
Sire Comus (GB) 1809	Sorcerer; 1796	Young Giantess	Diomed
Sire Comus (GB) 1809	Sorcerer; 1796	Young Giantess	Giantess
Sire Comus (GB) 1809	Houghton Lass; 1801	Sir Peter Teazle	Highflyer*
Sire Comus (GB) 1809	Houghton Lass; 1801	Sir Peter Teazle	Papillon
Sire Comus (GB) 1809	Houghton Lass; 1801	Alexina	King Fergus
Sire Comus (GB) 1809	Houghton Lass; 1801	Alexina	Lardella
Dam Cervantes mare (GB) 1825	Cervantes; 1806	Don Quixote	Eclipse
Dam Cervantes mare (GB) 1825	Cervantes; 1806	Don Quixote	Grecian Princess
Dam Cervantes mare (GB) 1825	Cervantes; 1806	Evelina	Highflyer*
Dam Cervantes mare (GB) 1825	Cervantes; 1806	Evelina	Termagant
Dam Cervantes mare (GB) 1825	Emma; 1817	Don Cossack	Haphazard
Dam Cervantes mare (GB) 1825	Emma; 1817	Don Cossack	Alderney
Dam Cervantes mare (GB) 1825	Emma; 1817	Vespa	Delpini
Dam Cervantes mare (GB) 1825	Emma; 1817	Vespa	Faith (Family:2-d)

* Grey Momus is inbred 4S × 4D to the stallion Highflyer, meaning that he appears fourth generation on the sire side of his pedigree and fourth generation on the dam side of his pedigree.
