= William Scott (jockey) =

British jockey

Bill Scott
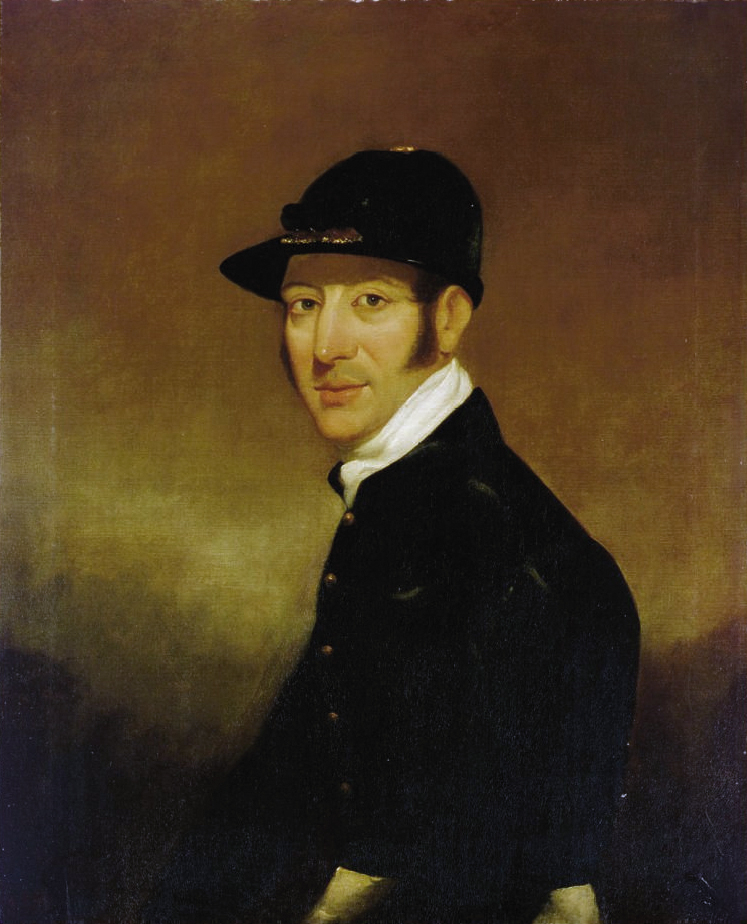
- Portrait of the jockey William Scott, by John Hayes

Personal information
- Born: 1797 Chippenham, Cambridgeshire, England
- Died: 26 September 1848 (aged 50–51) Malton, North Yorkshire, England
- Occupation: Jockey

Horse racing career
- Sport: Horse racing
- Career wins: Not known

Major racing wins
- Ascot Gold Cup (1834, 1837) British Classic Race wins: St. Leger Stakes (1821, 1825, 1828, 1829, 1838, 1839, 1840, 1841, 1846); Epsom Derby (1832, 1835, 1842, 1843); Epsom Oaks (1836, 1838, 1841); 2,000 Guineas (1842, 1843, 1846)

Significant horses
- Velocipede, The Colonel, Memnon, Rowton, St. Giles, Mündig, Attila, Touchstone; Don John, Charles the Twelfth, Cotherstone, Sir Tatton Sykes, Glaucus
- Updated on 29 January 2022

William Scott (1797–1848) was a British jockey. He was a brother of the horse trainer John Scott who frequently conditioned horses that he rode.

Based at his brother's Whitewall Stables in Malton, North Yorkshire, Scott won nineteen of the British Classic Races, including the St. Leger Stakes a record nine times of which four were in a row from 1838 through 1841.

He was already a jockey of some national renown by the early 1830s, being described as the "Chifney of the north". "For hand, seat and science in a race, he is very little inferior to anyone." He was also "possessed of considerable property (part in right of his wife)".

In 1836, Scott won the first of his three Epsom Oaks aboard Cyprian, a filly owned and trained by his brother John. He also owned (and trained) Sir Tatton Sykes whom he rode to victory in the 1846 2,000 Guineas, his third win as a jockey in that Classic. He also rode Sir Tatton Sykes to his ninth victory in that year's St. Leger Stakes.

According to the Roger Longrigg book, The History of Horse Racing, Scott reportedly consumed alcohol in excessive quantities which sometimes affected his racing performance. According to several sources, Sir Tatton Sykes, who finished second in the Epsom Derby, would have won the race "if Scott had not been drunk and unable to steer his mount on a proper course."

He is not to be confused with William Harvey Scott (died 1885), trainer and cross-country jockey, notably earning second-place finishes in the 1843 and 1844 Grand National.

Scott died at his home at Highfield, Malton in 1848 having ridden almost to the time of his death. He is said to have declared on his deathbed that he "had never pulled a horse in his life, never gone to bed sober and never kissed a lass against her will".

== Bibliography ==
- Longrigg, Roger (Foreword by Paul Mellon) The History of Horse Racing (1972) Macmillan, London ISBN 0-333-13699-3
