= John Frederick Herring Sr. =

English painter (1795–1865)

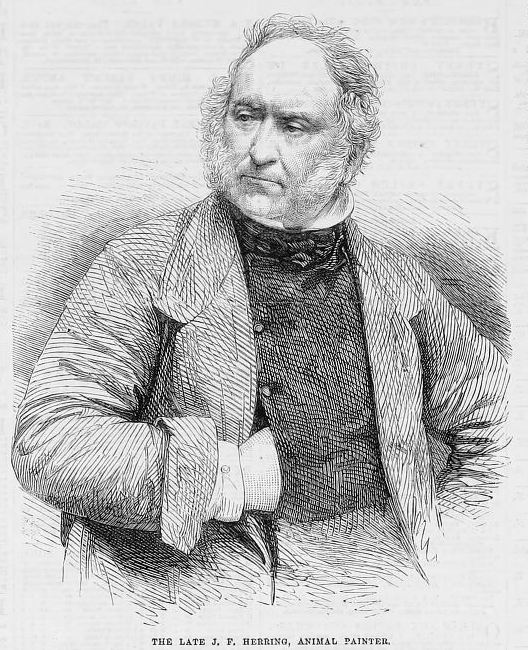
- Born: September 12, 1795; London, England
- Died: September 23, 1865 (aged 70)
- Occupation: Painter
- Children: John Frederick Herring Jr.

John Frederick Herring Sr. (12 September 1795 – 23 September 1865), also known as John Frederick Herring I, was an English painter, sign maker and coachman, achieving great fame as an artist in the Victorian era. He painted the 1848 "Pharoah's Chariot Horses" (archaic spelling "Pharoah"). He amended his signature "SR" (senior) in 1836, with the growing fame of his teenage son (1 of 4) John Frederick Herring Jr.

== Life and work ==
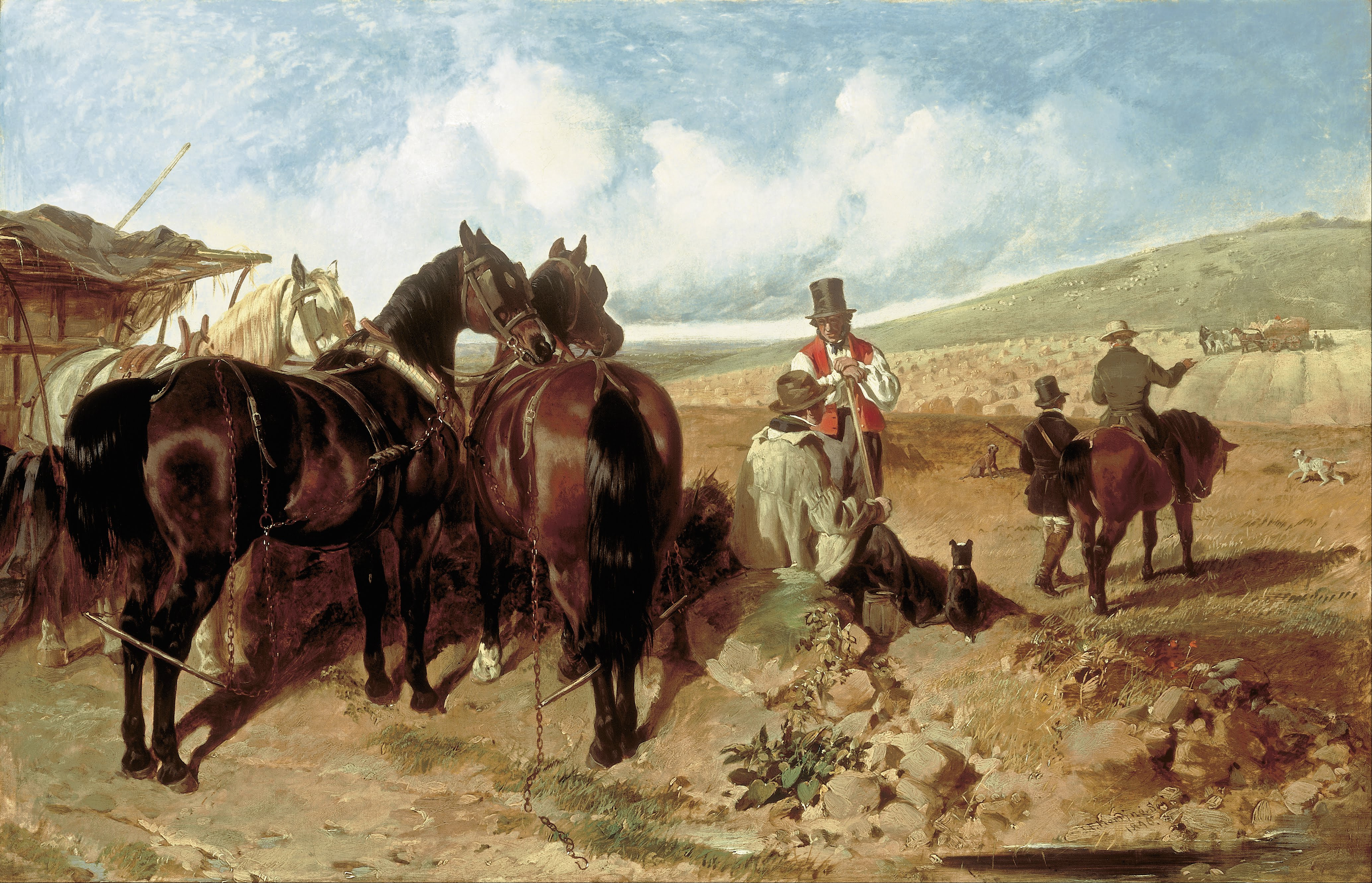
Autumn

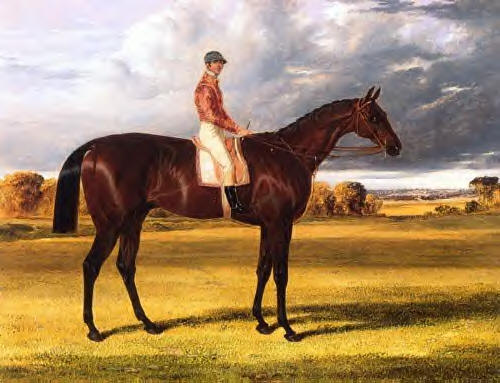
Painting of Amato, winner of The Derby Stakes in 1838

Painting of Pyrrhus the First (1846)

Herring, born in London in 1795, was the son of a London merchant of Dutch parentage, who had been born overseas in the United States. The first eighteen years of Herring's life were spent in London, where his greatest interests were drawing and horses. In the year 1814, at the age of 18, he moved to Doncaster in the north of England, arriving in time to witness the Duke of Hamilton's "William" win the St. Leger Stakes horserace. By 1815, Herring had married Ann Harris; his sons John Frederick Herring Jr., Charles Herring, and Benjamin Herring were all to become artists, while his two daughters, Ann and Emma, both married painters. When she was barely of age in 1845 Ann married Harrison Weir.

In Doncaster, Herring was employed as a painter of inn signs and coach insignia on the sides of coaches, and his later contact with a firm owned by a Mr. Wood led to Herring's subsequent employment as a night coach driver. Herring spent his spare time painting portraits of horses for inn parlours, and he became known as the "artist coachman" (at the time). Herring's talent was recognized by wealthy customers, and he began painting hunters and racehorses for the gentry.

In 1830, John Frederick Herring, Senior left Doncaster for Newmarket, where he spent three years before moving to London. During this time, Herring might have received tuition from Abraham Cooper. In London, Herring experienced financial difficulties and was given financial assistance by W. T. Copeland, who commissioned many paintings, including some designs used for the Copeland Spode bone china. In 1840-1841, Herring visited Paris, painting several pictures, on the invitation of the Duc d'Orleans (the Duke of Orleans), son of the French King Louis-Phillipe.

In 1845, Herring was appointed Animal Painter to the Duchess of Kent, followed by a subsequent commission from Queen Victoria, who remained a patron for the rest of his life.

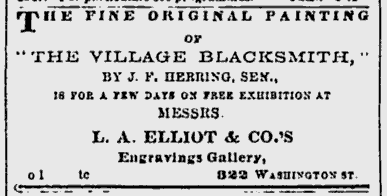
Advertisement for exhibition of Herring's work in Boston, Massachusetts, United States, in 1858

== Late themes ==
In 1853, Herring moved to rural Kent in the southeast of England and stopped painting horse portraits. He spent the last 12 years of his life at Meopham Park near Tonbridge, where he lived as a country squire. He then broadened his subject matter by painting agricultural scenes and narrative pictures, as well as his better-known sporting works of hunting, racing and shooting.

A highly successful and prolific artist, Herring ranks along with Sir Edwin Landseer as one of the more eminent animal painters of mid-nineteenth century Europe. The paintings of Herring were very popular, and many were engraved, including his 33 winners of the St. Leger and his 21 winners of the Epsom Derby. Herring exhibited at the Royal Academy from 1818 to 1865, at the British Institution from 1830 to 1865, and at the Society of British Artists in 1836-1852, where Herring became Vice-President in 1842.

== Tattoo ==
Herring's 1848 painting Pharaoh's Chariot Horses (often referred to simply as Pharaoh's Horses) became a significant motif in American traditional tattooing between turn of the 20th century and the 1950s. The image, which depicts three horse heads, was adapted from Victorian-era prints into tattoo flash by the 1920s. Tattoo artists such as Gus Wagner, Percy Waters, and George Fosdick popularized the design. The name references the biblical story of Exodus 15.

== See also ==
- George Stubbs - horse painter
