= Goldfinder (horse) =

18th-century British Thoroughbred racehorse

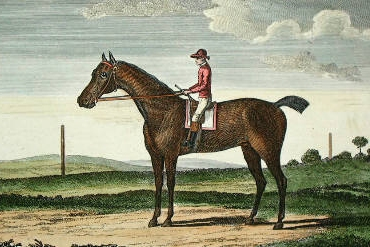
- Painting of Goldfinder
- Sire: Snap
- Grandsire: Snip
- Dam: Blank mare
- Damsire: Blank
- Sex: Stallion
- Foaled: 1764
- Country: Great Britain
- Colour: Bay
- Breeder: John St Leger Douglas
- Owner: Jenison Shafto; Sir Charles Sedley
- Record: 11: 11-0-0

Major wins
- 1400 Guineas Stakes (1768); Ascot Stakes (1768); Newmarket Challenge Cup & Whip (1769, 1770)

Goldfinder (1764–1789) was an undefeated Thoroughbred racehorse. His wins included two Newmarket Challenge Cup and Whips. After retiring from racing he became a successful sire.

== Background ==
Goldfinder was a bay colt foaled in 1764. He was bred by John St Leger Douglas and was sired by the undefeated racehorse and Champion sire Snap. His dam was a daughter of Blank, another Champion sire.

== Racing career ==
Goldfinder made his racecourse debut at Newmarket on 5 April 1768, beating two opponents to win a sweepstakes of 200 guineas each (known as the 1400 Guineas). On 29 April he beat six rivals to win the Ascot Stakes. His next race came in October, where he beat five rivals (including Lord Bolingbroke's 4/5 favourite Sejanus) to win another sweepstakes of 200 guineas each. The next day he was due to race a filly belonging to Sir John Moore, but Moore paid a 300 guinea forfeit and withdrew his horse. In his last race as a four-year-old he won the Contribution Stakes, beating four other horses.

His first race as a five-year-old was on 31 March, where he beat four horses to win a 150 guineas race. In October he faced five rivals in the Newmarket Challenge Cup and Whip (known as 'the Cup'). In the betting the Duke of Ancaster's Jethro was the 2/1 favourite, with Goldfinder at 5/2, Sir Charles Bunbury's Bellario at 4/1, 5/1 and 6/1 against Marquis, with Sir Lawrence Dundas's A-la-greque and Lord Rockingham's Cosmo both at 8/1. Goldfinder won this race and then beat Jethro again to win a Subscription of 50 guineas each a few days later. In his final two races as a five-year-old he walked over for a 150 guineas race and the Contribution Stakes.

At the start of the 1770 season he walked over for a Subscription stakes. In October he won the Newmarket Challenge Cup and Whip for a second time, in another walkover. It was intended that he would run in a King's Plate against the undefeated Eclipse, but the day after the Cup he broke down in an exercise.

== Stud career ==
In 1771 he was sold to Sir Charles Sedley for 1,350 guineas. As a stallion he stood at Nuthall Temple in Nottinghamshire. He had a successful stallion career, siring many winners, including the 1781 St. Leger Stakes winner Serina. After the death of Sir Charles Sedley in 1778, Goldfinder was sold for 350 guineas and moved to Mitcham, Surrey. He spent the rest of his stud career there and retired after the 1784 season. Goldfinder died in 1789, aged 25 years.

== Pedigree ==
Pedigree of Goldfinder, bay stallion, 1764
Sire Snap (GB) br. 1750	Snip (GB) br. 1736	Flying Childers b. 1714	Darley Arabian
Sire Snap (GB) br. 1750	Snip (GB) br. 1736	Flying Childers b. 1714	Betty Leedes
Sire Snap (GB) br. 1750	Snip (GB) br. 1736	Sister to Soreheels	Basto
Sire Snap (GB) br. 1750	Snip (GB) br. 1736	Sister to Soreheels	Sister to Mixbury
Sire Snap (GB) br. 1750	Sister to Slipby (GB)	Fox b. 1714	Clumsey
Sire Snap (GB) br. 1750	Sister to Slipby (GB)	Fox b. 1714	Bay Peg
Sire Snap (GB) br. 1750	Sister to Slipby (GB)	Gipsey; 1725	Bay Bolton
Sire Snap (GB) br. 1750	Sister to Slipby (GB)	Gipsey; 1725	Newcastle Turk mare
Dam Blank mare (GB)	Blank (GB) b. 1740	Godolphin Arabian* b. c.1724	(unknown)
Dam Blank mare (GB)	Blank (GB) b. 1740	Godolphin Arabian* b. c.1724	(unknown)
Dam Blank mare (GB)	Blank (GB) b. 1740	Little Mare	Bartlett's Childers
Dam Blank mare (GB)	Blank (GB) b. 1740	Little Mare	Flying Whig
Dam Blank mare (GB)	Regulus mare (GB)	Regulus b. 1739	Godolphin Arabian*
Dam Blank mare (GB)	Regulus mare (GB)	Regulus b. 1739	Grey Robinson
Dam Blank mare (GB)	Regulus mare (GB)	Lonsdale Arabian mare	Lonsdale Arabian
Dam Blank mare (GB)	Regulus mare (GB)	Lonsdale Arabian mare	Bonnylass

Note: b. = Bay, br. = Brown

* Sire Thomas is inbred 3D × 4D to the stallion Godolphin Arabian, meaning that he appears third generation and fourth generation once each on the dam side of his pedigree.

== See also ==
- List of leading Thoroughbred racehorses
