= Blacklegs (horse) =

British Thoroughbred racehorse

- Sire: Flying Childers
- Grandsire: Darley Arabian
- Dam: Basto mare
- Damsire: Basto
- Sex: Stallion
- Foaled: 1728
- Country: Great Britain
- Colour: Bay
- Breeder: 2nd Duke of Devonshire
- Owner: 3rd Duke of Devonshire

Major wins
- 700 gs Stakes (1733); Match against Sly (1733); 275 gs Sweepstakes (1733)

Awards
- Champion sire of Great Britain (1746)

Blacklegs (foaled 1728) was a British Thoroughbred racehorse and sire who was the champion sire of Great Britain in 1746. He was bred by William Cavendish, 2nd Duke of Devonshire, and owned by his son William Cavendish, 3rd Duke of Devonshire.

== Background ==
Blacklegs was a bay colt bred by William Cavendish, 2nd Duke of Devonshire, and foaled in 1728. He was sired by the Duke of Devonshire's Flying Childers, who was undefeated in six starts as a racecourse. Flying Childers was also a successful stallion and was champion sire of Great Britain twice. Amongst his other progeny were the sires Blaze and Snip, along with Second, Spanking Roger and Roundhead. Blacklegs' dam was an unnamed daughter of Basto. This Basto mare also foaled the champion sire Crab, as well as the previously mentions Snip and Second. After the 2nd Duke of Devonshire's death in 1729, Blacklegs was owned by his son and successor William Cavendish, 3rd Duke of Devonshire.

== Racing career ==
In October 1732 at Newmarket, Blacklock beat the Duke of Bridgewater's Beauty over for mile for 200 guineas. The following April he won the 700 guineas stakes, beating Sly, Favourite and Quibble over four miles. He beat Sly again in October, this time in a 300 guineas match race. At the same meeting he beat Mr. Honeywood's grey mare, Looby, Lord Gower's chestnut mare, Spot, Bumper, Favourite and Robin.

== Stud career ==
Blacklock retired to the Duke of Devonshire's stud. He became a successful stallion and was champion sire of Great Britain in 1746. He sired several good runners and the dams of Captain, Cassandra, Dorimond, Trajan, Marcus and Jalap.

== Pedigree ==
Pedigree of Blacklegs, bay stallion, 1728
| Sire Flying Childers (GB) | Darley Arabian | (unknown) | (unknown) |
| Sire Flying Childers (GB) | Darley Arabian | (unknown) | (unknown) |
| Sire Flying Childers (GB) | Darley Arabian | (unknown) | (unknown) |
| Sire Flying Childers (GB) | Darley Arabian | (unknown) | (unknown) |
| Sire Flying Childers (GB) | Betty Leedes | Careless | Spanker |
| Sire Flying Childers (GB) | Betty Leedes | Careless | Barb mare |
| Sire Flying Childers (GB) | Betty Leedes | Leedes Arabian mare | Leedes Arabian* |
| Sire Flying Childers (GB) | Betty Leedes | Leedes Arabian mare | Spanker mare |
| Dam Basto mare (GB) | Basto | Byerley Turk | (unknown) |
| Dam Basto mare (GB) | Basto | Byerley Turk | (unknown) |
| Dam Basto mare (GB) | Basto | Bay Peg | Leedes Arabian* |
| Dam Basto mare (GB) | Basto | Bay Peg | Spanker mare |
| Dam Basto mare (GB) | Curwen Bay Barb mare | Curwen's Bay Barb | (unknown) |
| Dam Basto mare (GB) | Curwen Bay Barb mare | Curwen's Bay Barb | (unknown) |
| Dam Basto mare (GB) | Curwen Bay Barb mare | Curwen Spot mare | Curwen Spot |
| Dam Basto mare (GB) | Curwen Bay Barb mare | Curwen Spot mare | White-legged Lowther mare |
