= Squirt (horse) =

British Thoroughbred racehorse

- Sire: Bartlett's Childers
- Grandsire: Darley Arabian
- Dam: Sister to Old Country Wench
- Damsire: Snake
- Sex: Stallion
- Foaled: 1732
- Country: Great Britain
- Colour: Chestnut
- Breeder: William Metcalfe
- Owner: Charles Colyear, 2nd Earl of Portmore
- Last updated on 27 May 2016

Squirt (1732 – ?) was a Thoroughbred racehorse, best known as the grandsire of Eclipse, founder of the breed's dominant sire line. He lived at a time when the Thoroughbred breed was in its infancy, before even the foundation of the Jockey Club (in 1750) and General Stud Book (in 1791). Thus information is incomplete.

== Breeding ==
Squirt was bred by William Metcalfe of Beverley, Yorkshire. His sire was Bartlett's Childers, a full brother to Flying Childers, considered the greatest race horse of his time. Bartlett's Childers, also known as Bleeding Childers because he bled from the nose on exertion, never raced but did become a major sire. Squirt's dam, Sister to Old Country Wench, had earlier produced Grey Robinson, who in turn produced the undefeated Regulus.

== Racing career ==
During his racing career, Squirt was owned by Charles Colyear, (2nd) Earl of Portmore. He began racing at five, as was customary at the time. His performances include:

- in 1737, won 200 guineas at Newmarket
- in 1738, beaten by Lath in a match race at Newmarket
- in 1739, won 200 guineas at Newmarket, 40 guineas at Epsom, 50 guineas at Stamford, and £30 at Winchester
- in 1740, won a plate at Salisbury.

== Breeding career ==
Squirt then became a stallion for Sir Henry Harpur of Calke, Derbyshire. Squirt was nearly put down after developing laminitis, but his groom begged for a reprieve. Squirt's offspring includes:

- Marske (1750), sire of the unbeaten Eclipse, amongst others. Through Eclipse, Squirt's sire line continues to the present day. In Great Britain and Ireland, his sire line includes leading sires such as Sadler's Wells, Danehill and Galileo. In North America, leading sires in his line include Bold Ruler (sire of Secretariat), Mr. Prospector (ancestor of American Pharoah), Danzig, Storm Cat, AP Indy, Giant's Causeway and Tapit. In Japan, Squirt's sire line includes leading sires Sunday Silence, King Kamehameha and Deep Impact, while in Australia leading sires from his line include Redoute's Choice, Encosta De Lago and Fastnet Rock.
- Syphon (1750), winner of the £160 Great Subscription at York and others, sire of Sweetwilliam and Sweetbriar
- Tim (1752), whose daughters would go on to be significant producers
- Pratt's Old Mare, who went on to produce 17 foals, including Pumpkin, winner of 20 plates, and the mares Purity and Maiden, winner of 15 plates.

== Sire line tree ==
- Squirt
  - Marske
    - Eclipse
      - Planet
      - Potoooooooo
        - Coriander
        - Alderman
        - Asparagus
        - Waxy
        - Champion
        - Tyrant
        - Vespasian
        - Worthy
      - Jupiter
        - Ganymede
        - Thunderbolt
        - Jupiter
        - Sir Walter
      - Satellite
      - King Fergus
        - Honest Tom
        - Overton
        - Poor Jack
        - Young Traveller
        - Ormond
        - Beningbrough
        - Brother to Overton
        - Deserter
        - Hambletonian
        - Garswood
        - Johnny
        - Warter
      - Vertumnus
        - Baronet
      - Boudrow
      - Obscurity
        - Bacchus
        - Bompard
      - Joe Andrews
        - Dick Andrews
      - Mercury
        - Precipitate
        - Silver
        - Gohanna
        - Hermes
      - Young Eclipse
        - Young Eclipse
      - Dungannon
        - Lurcher
        - Hambleton
        - Bedford
        - Young Dungannon
        - Dungannon
        - Boaster
      - Saltram
        - Whiskey
        - Royalist
        - Whip
        - Oscar
      - Volunteer
        - Stirling
        - Spread Eagle
        - Volunteer
        - Magic
        - Eagle
        - Fop
      - Serjeant
      - Alexander
        - Tityrus
        - Hephastion
      - Meteor
      - Don Quixote
        - Sancho
        - Cervantes
        - Whitenose
        - Amadis
      - Pegasus
        - Expedition
        - Peace-Maker
        - Alonzo
        - Hippomenes
      - Brush
    - Transit
    - Hephestion
    - Mungo (Leviathan)
    - Narcissus
    - Pretender
      - Longitude
      - Pretender
      - No Pretender
      - Pandolpho
        - Mowbray
    - Shark
    - Young Marske
      - Ruler
        - Weathercock
        - Pencil
        - Governor
      - Prince Lee Boo
      - Abba Thule
        - Clifton
      - Spanker
      - Shuttle
        - Stavely
        - Middlethorpe
        - Pope
    - Garrick (Hyperion)
      - Roscius
      - Sulky
    - Pontac
      - Sir Thomas
    - Jocundo
  - Syphon
    - Tippler
    - Daisy
    - Sweetwilliam
      - Captain Plume
      - Phoenix
    - Tosspot
    - Sweetbriar
      - Chocolate
        - Cornet
      - Assassin
        - Gunpowder
    - Tipsey
    - Enterprise
    - Pastor
    - Clown
    - Streamer
    - Tandem
      - Creeper
        - Mouse
    - Gallantry
  - Tim

== Pedigree ==
Pedigree of Squirt, chestnut horse, 1732
Sire Bartlett's Childers (GB) 1716	Darley Arabian (GB); 1700	(unknown)	(unknown)
Sire Bartlett's Childers (GB) 1716	Darley Arabian (GB); 1700	(unknown)	(unknown)
Sire Bartlett's Childers (GB) 1716	Darley Arabian (GB); 1700	(unknown)	(unknown)
Sire Bartlett's Childers (GB) 1716	Darley Arabian (GB); 1700	(unknown)	(unknown)
Sire Bartlett's Childers (GB) 1716	Betty Leedes (GB); ~1700	Old Careless (GB)	Spanker
Sire Bartlett's Childers (GB) 1716	Betty Leedes (GB); ~1700	Old Careless (GB)	Barb Mare
Sire Bartlett's Childers (GB) 1716	Betty Leedes (GB); ~1700	Cream Cheeks (GB)	Leedes Arabian
Sire Bartlett's Childers (GB) 1716	Betty Leedes (GB); ~1700	Cream Cheeks (GB)	Spanker Mare
Dam Sister to Old Country Wench (GB) ~1713	Snake (GB); 1705	Lister Turk (Tur)	(unknown)
Dam Sister to Old Country Wench (GB) ~1713	Snake (GB); 1705	Lister Turk (Tur)	(unknown)
Dam Sister to Old Country Wench (GB) ~1713	Snake (GB); 1705	Hautboy Mare (GB)	Hautboy
Dam Sister to Old Country Wench (GB) ~1713	Snake (GB); 1705	Hautboy Mare (GB)	(unknown)
Dam Sister to Old Country Wench (GB) ~1713	Grey Wilkes (GB)	Hautboy (GB)	Darcy's White Turk
Dam Sister to Old Country Wench (GB) ~1713	Grey Wilkes (GB)	Hautboy (GB)	Royal Mare
Dam Sister to Old Country Wench (GB) ~1713	Grey Wilkes (GB)	Miss Darcy's Pet Mare (GB)	(unknown)
Dam Sister to Old Country Wench (GB) ~1713	Grey Wilkes (GB)	Miss Darcy's Pet Mare (GB)	Sedbury Royal Mare
