= Snap (horse) =

Thoroughbred racehorse

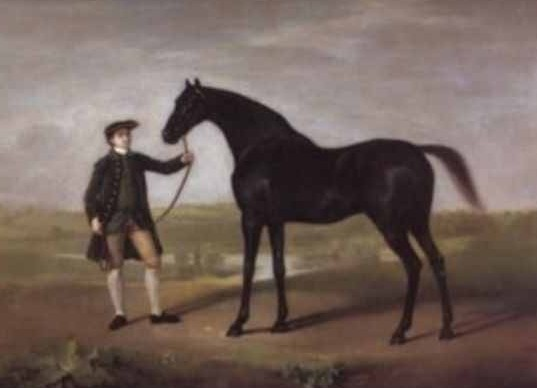
- Painting of Snap
- Sire: Snip
- Grandsire: Flying Childers
- Dam: Sister to Slipby
- Damsire: Fox
- Sex: Stallion
- Foaled: 1750
- Country: Great Britain
- Colour: Brown
- Breeder: Cuthbert Routh
- Owner: Jenison Shafto; Earl of Sandwich
- Record: 4: 4-0-0
- Earnings: £3,250

Major wins
- Match against Marske (1756, twice); Match against Sweepstakes (1757)

Awards
- Leading sire in Great Britain and Ireland (1767, 1768, 1769, 1771)

Snap (1750 – July 1777) was a Thoroughbred racehorse who won all four of his races. After retiring from racing, he became a successful stallion. He was Champion sire four times and his progeny included the undefeated Goldfinder.

== Background ==
Snap was a brown colt foaled in 1750. Bred by Cuthbert Routh and Lord Portmore, as a yearling he was valued at £70. Snap's sire was Snip, a son of the undefeated Flying Childers. His dam was a sister to Slipby and a daughter to Fox. He was sold to Jenison Shafto when Cuthbert Routh died in 1752.

== Racing career ==
Snap's first race came in the spring of 1756 at Newmarket, where he beat Marske to win 1000 guineas. Both horses were carrying ten stone in weight. In the following meeting at Newmarket he again beat Marske for 1000 guineas off level weights, after starting as the 1/10 favourite he won easily. Snap beat Farmer and Music to win the £100 Free Plate, which was run in four mile heats. The Free Plate was run at York, his only race away from Newmarket. His fourth and final race came at Newmarket in April 1757, where he beat Sweepstakes to win 1000 guineas.

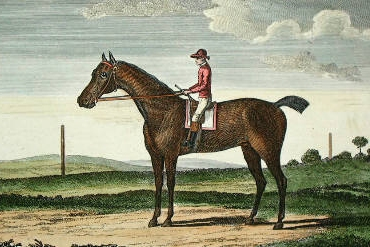
Snap's son Goldfinder

== Stud career ==
After his final race Snap was sent to Kenton, Northumberland to replace his sire Snip at stud. He became a leading sire and was Champion sire in 1767, 1768, 1769 and 1771. His progeny included Latham's Snap and the undefeated Goldfinder. His was also the broodmare sire of Epsom Derby winners Assassin and Sir Peter Teazle. Sir Peter Teazle also went on to become a 10-time Champion sire. Snap died in July 1777 at West Wratting in Cambridgeshire, where he had been standing at stud since 1767. In total he sired winners of over 260 races worth over £90,000.

== Sire line tree ==
- Snap
  - Snap (Hazard)
  - Omnium
    - Ovid
    - Xanthippus
    - Hippogriff
    - Omnium
  - Snap (Latham)
  - Lofty
  - Snap (Chedworth)
  - Mambruello
  - Snipe
  - Ancient Pistol
    - Ancient Pistol
    - Hardwicke
  - Goldfinder
    - Goldfinder
    - Molecatcher
  - Juniper
    - Young Juniper
    - Dromedary
  - Scaramouch
  - Mexican

== Pedigree ==
Pedigree of Snap, brown stallion, 1750
Sire Snip br. 1736	Flying Childers b. 1714	Darley Arabian b. c.1700	(unknown)
Sire Snip br. 1736	Flying Childers b. 1714	Darley Arabian b. c.1700	(unknown)
Sire Snip br. 1736	Flying Childers b. 1714	Betty Leedes	Old Careless
Sire Snip br. 1736	Flying Childers b. 1714	Betty Leedes	Sister to Leedes
Sire Snip br. 1736	Sister to Soreheels	Basto blk. 1703	Byerley Turk
Sire Snip br. 1736	Sister to Soreheels	Basto blk. 1703	Bay Peg*
Sire Snip br. 1736	Sister to Soreheels	Sister to Mixbury	Curwen's Bay Barb
Sire Snip br. 1736	Sister to Soreheels	Sister to Mixbury	Curwen Spot mare
Dam Sister to Slipby	Fox b. 1714	Clumsey gr. c.1700	Hautboy
Dam Sister to Slipby	Fox b. 1714	Clumsey gr. c.1700	Miss Darcy's Pet mare
Dam Sister to Slipby	Fox b. 1714	Bay Peg*	Leedes Arabian
Dam Sister to Slipby	Fox b. 1714	Bay Peg*	Young Bald Peg
Dam Sister to Slipby	Gipsey; 1725	Bay Bolton br. 1705	Grey Hautboy
Dam Sister to Slipby	Gipsey; 1725	Bay Bolton br. 1705	Makeless mare
Dam Sister to Slipby	Gipsey; 1725	Newcastle Turk mare	Newcastle Turk
Dam Sister to Slipby	Gipsey; 1725	Newcastle Turk mare	Taffolet Barb mare

Note: b. = Bay, blk. = Black, br. = Brown, gr. = Grey

* Snap is inbred 4S × 3D to the mare Bay Peg, meaning that she appears fourth generation on the sire side of his pedigree and third generation on the dam side of his pedigree.

== See also ==
- List of leading Thoroughbred racehorses
