= Sancho (horse) =

British-bred Thoroughbred racehorse

- Sire: Don Quixote
- Grandsire: Eclipse
- Dam: Highflyer mare
- Damsire: Highflyer
- Sex: Stallion
- Foaled: 1801
- Country: United Kingdom of Great Britain and Ireland
- Colour: Bay
- Breeder: Colonel Harry Mellish
- Owner: Colonel Harry Mellish
- Trainer: Bartle Atkinson
- Record: 12: 8-4-0
- Earnings: £5,954

Major wins
- St Leger Stakes (1804); Match against Hannibal (1805); Match against Pavilion (1805); Match against Bobtail (1805); Match against Sir David (1805)

Sancho (1801–September 1809) was a British Thoroughbred racehorse and sire best known for winning the classic St Leger Stakes in 1804. In a racing career which lasted from May 1804 until October 1806 he won eight of his twelve competitive races. Originally trained in Yorkshire, he was undefeated in four races as a three-year-old in 1805, culminating with his victory in the St Leger at Doncaster Racecourse. In the following season he was transferred to race in the south of England where he won a series of lucrative match races against some of the leading horses of the day. His five-year-old season proved disappointing and expensive for his owner as he was injured and beaten in both of his races. Sancho was retired from racing and showed considerable promise as a sire of winners in a brief stud career.

== Background ==
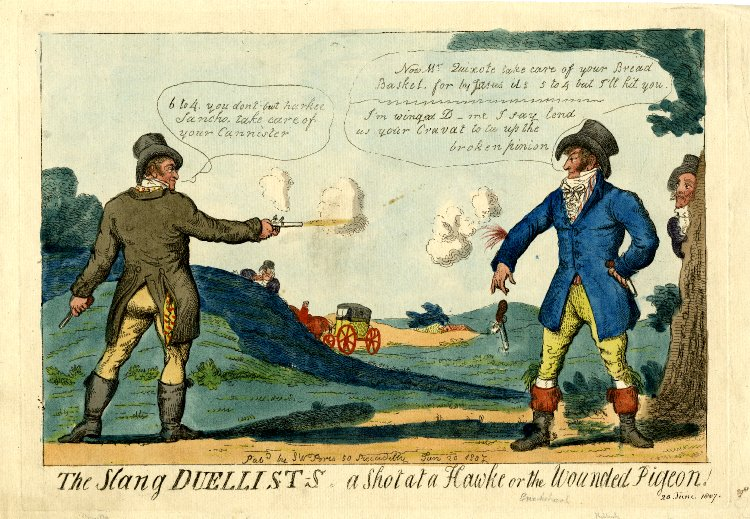
Sancho's owner Harry Mellish (right) fights a duel in 1807.

Sancho was a bay horse owned and bred Colonel Henry Mellish, a veteran of the Peninsular War, who engaged in duelling, prize-fighting and dog-fighting. His enthusiasm for racing of any kind was such that he once trained a pig to race and gambled on which of two raindrops would be the first to reach the bottom of a window-pane. Sancho was trained by the former jockey Bartle Atkinson.

Sancho's, sire Don Quixote was a chestnut son of Eclipse bred by Mr Taylor. Apart from Sancho, his most notable offspring was the successful breeding stallion Cervantes. Sancho's dam, an unnamed mare by Highflyer, was a sister of the St Leger winner Cowslip and of the influential broodmares Maid of All Work and Rachel.

At the time of Sancho's racing career, sweepstake races, in which a number of owners contributed a relatively small sum towards the prize money, were popular, but the most valuable events were match races with two runners. In these events, each of the owners put up half the prize, with the winner taking all. If a horse failed to appear for a race its owner usually had to pay a forfeit, typically amounting to half his original stake. Sancho, for instance, won 600 guineas for winning the St Leger in 1805, but 3000 guineas for winning a match race in the following year.

== Racing career ==
=== 1804: three-year-old season ===
Sancho made his first appearance on 16 May 1804 at Middleham Racecourse where he defeated Lord Strathmore's unnamed roan colt (the 4/6 favourite) and two others in a two-mile sweepstakes. Later on the same day he turned out again for a three-mile race in which he was matched against older horses at weight-for-age. On this occasion he started favourite and won from Lord Strathmore's four-year-old bay colt. Two weeks later at York Racecourse Sancho was brought back in distance to contest a sweepstakes for three-year-old colts and fillies over one and a half miles. He was made the 3/1 second favourite in a field of eight runners and won from Mr Cradock's bay colt.

Sancho did not compete again until 25 September, when he was one of eleven three-year-olds to contest the twenty-ninth running of the St Leger at Doncaster Racecourse. Mellish had gambled heavily on his horse, the 2/1 favourite, but was worried by the prevailing hot, dry weather, which left the course in a difficult and dangerous state ("hard as a granite road"). The conditions took their toll as three horses fell in the race and one jockey was seriously injured. Sancho took a decisive lead in the closing stages, and his rider Frank Buckle waved his whip to Mellish (conspicuous in a white satin vest) as a signal that he had the race won. At that moment, Mellish rushed from the stand to begin collecting his winnings without waiting to see Sancho cross the line in front of Sir Henry Tempest Vane's bay colt by Sir Peter.

=== 1805: four-year-old season ===
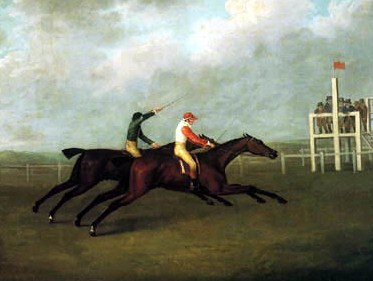
Sancho (foreground) defeats Hannibal in the 1,000 guinea match race at Brighton.

For the 1805 season, Sancho was moved south and was campaigned at Newmarket Racecourse in spring, making his first appearance of the year in the New Claret Stakes over the two mile "Ditch-In" course on 2 May. The race brought together the three classic winners of the previous season, with Sancho starting favourite ahead of the Derby winner Hannibal and the Oaks winner Pelisse. The race produced an unexpected result, as Lord Darlington's colt Pavilion, the outsider of the four-runner field, won from Sancho, with Hannibal third and Pelisse last. At the next meeting two weeks later, Sancho was beaten by Mr Boyce's ten-year-old Bobtail in a 500 guinea match race, but Mellish was able to claim 200 guineas later the same day, "receiving forfeit" when Sancho's two rivals failed to appear for a three-mile sweepstakes.

The St Leger winner's next run was at Brighton Racecourse on 26 July, when he faced Hannibal in a match race over one mile at level weights. The Derby winner was slightly favoured in the betting, but Sancho led from the start and "won easy" to claim a prize of 1000 guineas for his owner. Six days later at Lewes, Sancho contested an even more valuable match, when he was pitted against Pavilion for a prize of 3000 guineas. Frank Buckle on Sancho tracked Sam Chifney on Pavilion for most of the four mile distance before taking the lead in the closing stages to win by half a length. "Immense sums" had reportedly been wagered on the outcome. Two days after beating Pavilion, Sancho met Bobtail, the only other horse to have defeated him, in a one-mile match at the same venue. Receiving eleven pounds from Boyce's horse, Sancho defeated his older rival to win a further 200 guineas. There was some controversy afterwards when it was discovered that the Clerk of the Course had started the race in the wrong place, meaning that the horses had run further than the agreed distance, but the result was allowed to stand.

Sancho returned to Newmarket for his final run of the year on 1 October. He defeated Boyce's four-year-old Sir David over the Rowley Mile course to win his fourth consecutive match, and a prize of 500 guineas. According to the Sporting Magazine Sancho had not been trained for the race but nevertheless won "cleverly".

=== 1806: five-year-old season ===
Sancho's five-year-old season was adversely affected by injury: he made only two appearances and failed to win. Having missed the early part of the season he was scheduled to compete in a series of four matches at Lewes and Brighton in the summer. In the first of these races, he was ridden in a four-mile, 2000 guinea match against Pavilion at Lewes on 24 July. The event attracted heavy betting and a large crowd which included the Prince of Wales and many members of the British aristocracy. Before the race, Sancho looked less than fully fit and was opposed in the betting, but after tracking Pavilion in the early running, he took the lead ten furlongs from the finish and looked poised to win easily. With a quarter mile to go however, he began to show signs of lameness and then broke down completely with an injury to his left foreleg. Mellish also lost an estimated £18,000 in bets on the race and it was reported that Sancho would never race again. After the race the Prince of Wales, who had backed Pavilion, attempted to commiserate with Mellish, saying that that was sorry for him: "No you're not, your Royal Highness," Mellish retorted, "for you've won your money". Sancho was unable to run in the remaining summer matches, leaving Mellish to pay forfeits of totaling 1,600 guineas.

Mellish again paid forfeit when Sancho failed to appear for a match at Newmarket's First October meeting, but the horse reappeared at the Second October meeting for a match against Orville, the winner of the 1802 St Leger. His comeback proved brief however, as he again broke down injured in the race over the Abington Mile course and he was forced to miss two further matches scheduled that autumn. Sancho had been entered in three match races in the early part of 1807, but he did not reappear, and Mellish paid forfeit on each occasion.

== Stud career ==
Sancho began his stud career at Hodsack, four miles from Worksop, on the border of Yorkshire and Nottinghamshire, where he stood at a fee of 20 guineas, with half a guinea for the groom. Sancho stood as a stallion for only three full seasons, dying in September 1809 at the age of eight years. Despite his abbreviated stud career he had considerable success: the best of his progeny included Banquo (Goodwood Cup), Cannon Ball (Craven Stakes), Cato (July Stakes) and the successful breeding stallion Prime Minister.

== Pedigree ==
Pedigree of Sancho (GB), bay stallion, 1801
Sire Don Quixote (GB) 1784	Eclipse; 1764	Marske	Squirt*
Sire Don Quixote (GB) 1784	Eclipse; 1764	Marske	The Ruby Mare
Sire Don Quixote (GB) 1784	Eclipse; 1764	Spilletta	Regulus*
Sire Don Quixote (GB) 1784	Eclipse; 1764	Spilletta	Mother Western
Sire Don Quixote (GB) 1784	Grecian Princess; 1770	Williams Forester	Croft's Forester
Sire Don Quixote (GB) 1784	Grecian Princess; 1770	Williams Forester	Looby mare
Sire Don Quixote (GB) 1784	Grecian Princess; 1770	Coalition Colt mare	Coalition Colt
Sire Don Quixote (GB) 1784	Grecian Princess; 1770	Coalition Colt mare	Bustard mare
Dam Highflyer mare (GB) 1789	Highflyer; 1774	Herod	Tartar
Dam Highflyer mare (GB) 1789	Highflyer; 1774	Herod	Cypron
Dam Highflyer mare (GB) 1789	Highflyer; 1774	Rachel	Blank
Dam Highflyer mare (GB) 1789	Highflyer; 1774	Rachel	Regulus mare (1751)
Dam Highflyer mare (GB) 1789	Syphon mare 1771	Syphon	Squirt*
Dam Highflyer mare (GB) 1789	Syphon mare 1771	Syphon	Patriot mare
Dam Highflyer mare (GB) 1789	Syphon mare 1771	Regulus mare (1762)	Regulus*
Dam Highflyer mare (GB) 1789	Syphon mare 1771	Regulus mare (1762)	Snip mare (Family:17)

* Sancho is inbred 4S × 4D to the stallion Squirt, meaning that he appears fourth generation on the sire side of his pedigree and fourth generation on the dam side of his pedigree.

* Sancho is inbred 4S × 4D to the stallion Regulus, meaning that he appears fourth generation on the sire side of his pedigree and fourth generation on the dam side of his pedigree.
