= Tyrant (British horse) =

British Thoroughbred racehorse

- Sire: Potoooooooo
- Grandsire: Eclipse
- Dam: Sea-Fowl
- Damsire: Woodpecker
- Sex: Stallion
- Foaled: 1799
- Country: Kingdom of Great Britain
- Colour: Bay
- Breeder: Augustus FitzRoy, 3rd Duke of Grafton
- Owner: Augustus FitzRoy, 3rd Duke of Grafton
- Trainer: Robert Robson
- Record: 4:2-0-1

Major wins
- Epsom Derby (1802)

Tyrant (foaled 1799) was a British Thoroughbred racehorse and sire. In a career that lasted from April 1802 to April 1803 he ran four times and won two races. In the summer of 1802 he won the Derby on his second racecourse appearance, but the rest of his form was moderate and he was not considered the best of his generation.

== Background ==
Tyrant was a bay horse bred by his owner Augustus FitzRoy, 3rd Duke of Grafton. Tyrant was the third of three Derby winners sired by the unusually named Potoooooooo, a highly successful racehorse who became an important and influential sire. Tyrant was the second of a record seven Derby winners trained by Robert Robson at Newmarket, Suffolk. He was the fifth of fifteen foals produced by Sea-Fowl, a mare also known as Miss Brighton. The best of Sea-Fowl's other offspring was probably Trafalgar, who was beaten by a head by Paris in the 1806 Derby.

== Racing career ==
=== 1802: three-year-old season ===
Tyrant made his first racecourse appearance at Newmarket on 20 April 1802. He started at odds of 5/2 in a field of four runners over the Rowley Mile course and won from Sir Charles Bunbury's filly Julia, the odds-on favourite.

At Epsom on 3 June Tyrant started at odds of 7/1 for the Derby in a field on nine runners. Ridden by Frank Buckle, he was restrained in the early stages as the lead was contested by Mr Wilson's unnamed Young Eclipse colt (the 11/8 favourite) and Sir Charles Bunbury's Orlando. As the two leaders weakened in the straight, Buckle produced Tyrant to take the lead and win the 1,500 guinea prize. Pierce Egan attributed the victory to Buckle's tactical skills and described Tyrant as "one of the worst horses that ever won a Derby."

After a break of four months, Tyrant reappeared at Newmarket in autumn. On 6 October he ran a subscription race over the two-mile "Ditch In" course. He started favourite at odds of 5/6 but finished fourth of the five runners behind Julia, Duxbury and Gulliver.

=== 1803: four-year-old season ===
Tyrant began his four-year-old campaign at Newmarket on 12 April when he ran in a 200 guinea Sweepstakes. Running over the Ditch In course he finished third behind Orlando and Mr Wilson's still unnamed Young Eclipse colt in a race which reversed the Derby form. At the next Newmarket meeting the Duke of Grafton paid a forfeit when Tyrant failed to appear for a match against Mr Howard's colt Creeper over the Ditch In course.

== Stud career ==
Tyrant did not have a career at stud due to having short legs. He was sold to the Earl of Jersey for use as a foxhunter and his name does not appear on any lists of stallions and he has no recorded progeny in the General Stud Book.

== Pedigree ==
Pedigree of Tyrant (GB), bay stallion, 1799
Sire Potoooooooo(GB) 1773	Eclipse; 1764	Marske	Squirt
Sire Potoooooooo(GB) 1773	Eclipse; 1764	Marske	The Ruby Mare
Sire Potoooooooo(GB) 1773	Eclipse; 1764	Spilletta	Regulus*
Sire Potoooooooo(GB) 1773	Eclipse; 1764	Spilletta	Mother Western
Sire Potoooooooo(GB) 1773	Sportsmistress; 1765	Sportsman	Cade*
Sire Potoooooooo(GB) 1773	Sportsmistress; 1765	Sportsman	Silvertail
Sire Potoooooooo(GB) 1773	Sportsmistress; 1765	Golden Locks	Oroonoko
Sire Potoooooooo(GB) 1773	Sportsmistress; 1765	Golden Locks	Crab mare
Dam Sea-Fowl (GB) 1788	Woodpecker; 1773	Herod	Tartar
Dam Sea-Fowl (GB) 1788	Woodpecker; 1773	Herod	Cypron
Dam Sea-Fowl (GB) 1788	Woodpecker; 1773	Miss Ramsden	Cade*
Dam Sea-Fowl (GB) 1788	Woodpecker; 1773	Miss Ramsden	Lonsdale mare
Dam Sea-Fowl (GB) 1788	Middlesex; 1772	Snap	Snip
Dam Sea-Fowl (GB) 1788	Middlesex; 1772	Snap	sister to Slipby
Dam Sea-Fowl (GB) 1788	Middlesex; 1772	Miss Cleveland	Regulus*
Dam Sea-Fowl (GB) 1788	Middlesex; 1772	Miss Cleveland	Midge (Family:3)

* Tyrant is inbred 4S x 4D to the stallion Regulus, meaning that he appears fourth generation on the sire side of his pedigree and fourth generation on the dam side of his pedigree.

* Tyrant is inbred 4S x 4D to the stallion Cade, meaning that he appears fourth generation on the sire side of his pedigree and fourth generation on the dam side of his pedigree.
