= Flying Childers =

British Thoroughbred racehorse

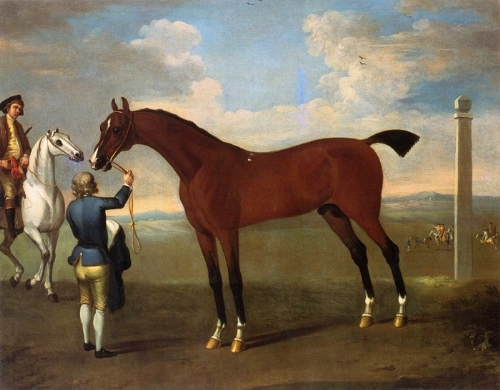
- Flying Childers by James Seymour
- Sire: Darley Arabian
- Dam: Betty Leedes
- Damsire: Old Careless
- Sex: Stallion
- Foaled: 1715
- Country: Great Britain
- Colour: Bay
- Breeder: Colonel Leonard Childers of Cantley Hall
- Owner: 2nd Duke of Devonshire
- Record: 6 starts, 6 wins

Awards
- Leading sire in GB and Ireland (1730, 1736)

Honours
- Flying Childers Stakes at Doncaster Racecourse

Flying Childers (1715–1741) was a famous undefeated 18th-century thoroughbred racehorse, foaled in 1714 at Carr House, Warmsworth, Doncaster, and is sometimes considered as the first truly great racehorse in the history of thoroughbreds and the first to catch the public imagination.

== Breeding ==
Flying Childers was sired by the great Darley Arabian, one of the three foundation stallions of the thoroughbred breed. His dam, Betty Leedes, was by (Old) Careless, and she was inbred to Spanker in the second and third generations (2x3). Betty Leedes was also the dam of the unraced, but successful sire, Bartlett's or Bleeding Childers who was also by the Darley Arabian. (Old) Careless was by the great stallion Spanker, and both were thought to be the best racehorses of their generation. Betty Leedes was one of the few outside mares allowed to breed to the Darley Arabian, who was mostly kept as a private sire by his owner.

== Racing record ==
Flying Childers gained the name of his breeder, Colonel Leonard Childers, in addition to his owner, the Duke of Devonshire, often being referred to as either Devonshire Childers or Flying Childers or sometimes simply Childers. Although the Duke received many offers for the colt, including one to pay for the horse's weight in gold, he remained the animal's owner throughout his life.

First racing at age six, the 15.2-hand colt won his maiden race, held April 1721 at Newmarket, to defeat Speedwell over four miles. He then won his second race in October, also at Newmarket, in a walk over, and his third race against Almanzor. It is said he completed this race, over the Round Course at Newmarket, in 6 minutes, 40 seconds and that he reached a speed of 82 1/2 feet per second or 1 mile per minute. This was claimed to make Flying Childers the only horse on record as having matched the top speed of the unbeaten Eclipse. By way of comparison, this would be nearly 40 seconds faster than the unbeaten Frankel ran the Newmarket Rowley Mile in his famous 2,000 Guineas victory of 2011, over 30 seconds faster than the current mile track record and very close to the five furlong track record set by Lochsong in 1994.

As a seven-year-old, he won his one start, a race at Newmarket where he beat Chaunter. In 1723, he won both his starts by walk over, one in April at Newmarket, the other a matchrace against Bobsey, who forfeited. Flying Childers then retired to stud.

=== Summary ===
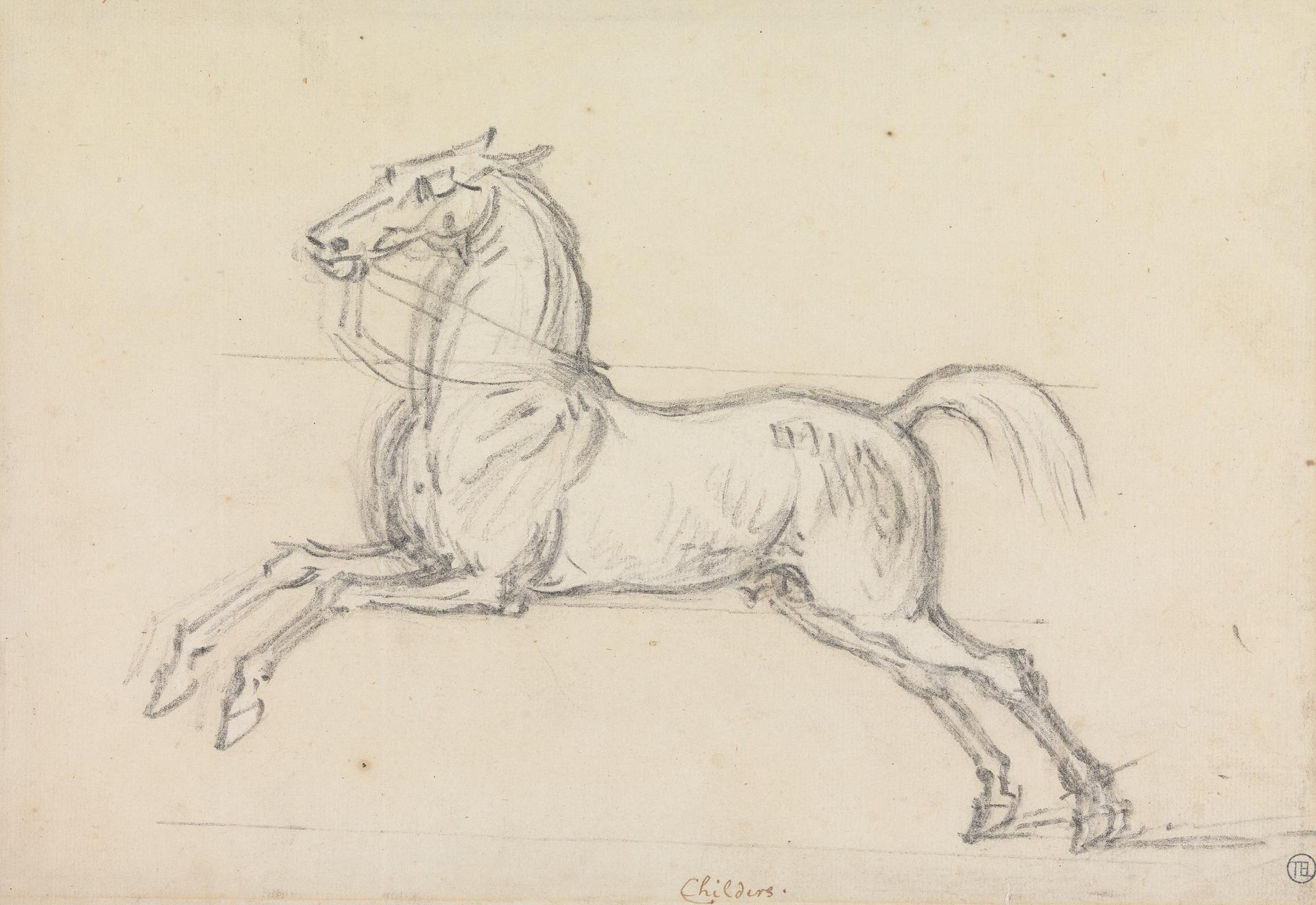
James Seymour - "Flying Childers Galloping to Left, Bridled but not Saddled" (Yale Center for British Art)

Date	Race name	Dist (miles)	Course	Prize	Odds	Runners	Place	Runner-up
April 1721	Match race v. Speedwell	4	Newmarket	500 guineas	not known	2	1	Speedwell
October 1721	Match race v. Speedwell	not known	Newmarket	500 guineas	not known	2	1	forfeit
1721	Trial v. Almanzor and Brown Betty	4	Newmarket	none	not known	3	1	not known
October 1722	Match race v. Chaunter	6	Newmarket	1000 guineas	not known	2	1	Chaunter
April 1723	Race v. Stripling and Bridgewater's Lonsdale Mare	not known	Newmarket	100 guineas	not known	3	1	forfeit
November 1723	Match race v. Bobsey	not known	Newmarket	100 guineas	not known	2	1	forfeit

== Stud record ==
Flying Childers stood as a private stallion at the Duke's Chatsworth estate in Derbyshire, until his death in 1741 at age 26. His offspring included several full-siblings from the Basto Mare: Blacklegs (br. 1728), a successful racehorse and sire for the Duke, Snip (b. 1736), a poor racehorse who sired the great stallion (Old) Snap, Second (br. 1732), who defeated both Sultan and Partner in 1737, Bay Basto (1729), Hip (1733), and Brown Basto (1738).

He also sired Spanking Roger (ch. 1732), who was undefeated against some of the best horses in the country except for one race where he threw his rider, Roundhead (ch. 1733), Fleec'em, Steady, and Blaze (b. 1733). Blaze was especially important, producing Sampson (his descendant Messenger is the founding sire of the Standardbred and very important in the Tennessee Walking Horse), Scrub, Childers (owned by John Tayloe II of Mount Airy Stud), and Shales (founding sire of the Norfolk Roadster, great influence on the Hackney). Lastly, Flying Childers was the damsire of the important foundation Thoroughbred sire Herod.

He died in 1741, aged 26. It was said he was "the fleetest horse that ever ran at Newmarket or, as generally believed, that was ever bred in the world".

== Legacy ==
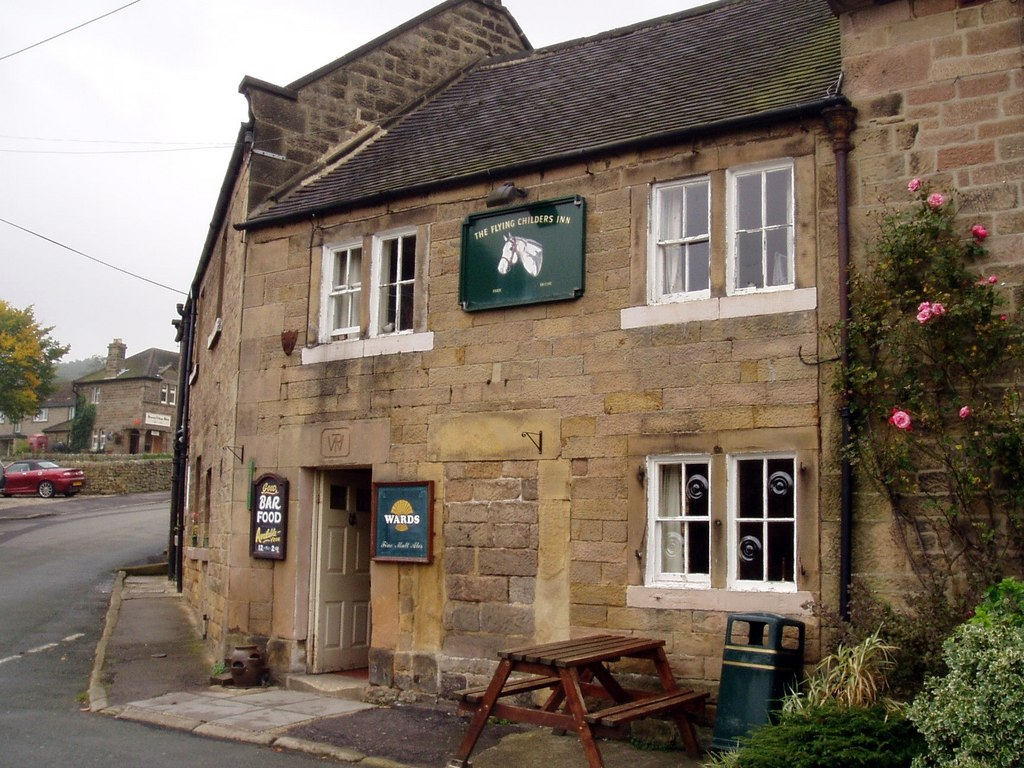
The Flying Childers Inn, Stanton in Peak, Derbyshire

Such was the horse's fame that pubs were named after him, including at Bessacarr in his home town Doncaster, South Yorkshire, Stanton in Peak, Derbyshire, and Kirby Bellars, Leicestershire.

== Sire line tree ==
- Childers (Flying)
  - Childers (Hampton Court)
    - Tantrum
  - Blacklegs
  - Grey Childers (Chedworth)
  - Plaistow
  - Fleec'em
  - Second
    - Merlin
      - Young Merlin
      - Prospero
      - Petit Maitre
    - Leedes
    - Sharp
  - Spanking Roger
  - Blaze
    - Sampson
      - Engineer
        - Mambrino
        - Black Tom
      - Bay Malton
      - Pilgrim
      - Treasurer
      - Phocion
    - Childers
    - Grenadier
    - Scrub
    - Shales
      - Scot Shales
      - Driver
        - Fireaway
  - Hip
  - Roundhead
    - Roger of the Vale
    - Stadtholder
    - Joseph Andrews
  - Steady
  - Ball
  - Snip
    - Snap
      - Snap (Hazard)
      - Omnium
        - Ovid
        - Xanthippus
        - Hippogriff
        - Omnium
      - Snap (Latham)
      - Lofty
      - Snap (Chedworth)
      - Mambruello
      - Snipe
      - Ancient Pistol
        - Ancient Pistol
        - Hardwicke
      - Goldfinder
        - Goldfinder
        - Molecatcher
      - Juniper
        - Young Juniper
        - Dromedary
      - Scaramouch
      - Mexican
    - Prince T'Quassaw
      - Tickler
      - Hottentot
    - Judgment
    - Fribble
    - Swiss
    - Young Snip
      - Ferdinando

== Pedigree ==
Pedigree of Childers (Flying), bay stallion, 1715
Sire Darley Arabian b. c.1700	(unknown)	(unknown)	(unknown)
Sire Darley Arabian b. c.1700	(unknown)	(unknown)	(unknown)
Sire Darley Arabian b. c.1700	(unknown)	(unknown)	(unknown)
Sire Darley Arabian b. c.1700	(unknown)	(unknown)	(unknown)
Sire Darley Arabian b. c.1700	(unknown)	(unknown)	(unknown)
Sire Darley Arabian b. c.1700	(unknown)	(unknown)	(unknown)
Sire Darley Arabian b. c.1700	(unknown)	(unknown)	(unknown)
Sire Darley Arabian b. c.1700	(unknown)	(unknown)	(unknown)
Dam Betty Leedes c.1702	Old Careless c.1692	Spanker* b. c.1670	D'Arcy Yellow Turk
Dam Betty Leedes c.1702	Old Careless c.1692	Spanker* b. c.1670	Old Morocco Mare*
Dam Betty Leedes c.1702	Old Careless c.1692	Barb mare c.1682	(unknown)
Dam Betty Leedes c.1702	Old Careless c.1692	Barb mare c.1682	(unknown)
Dam Betty Leedes c.1702	Cream Cheeks c.1692	Leedes Arabian blk. c.1685	(unknown)
Dam Betty Leedes c.1702	Cream Cheeks c.1692	Leedes Arabian blk. c.1685	(unknown)
Dam Betty Leedes c.1702	Cream Cheeks c.1692	Charming Jenny c.1680	Spanker*
Dam Betty Leedes c.1702	Cream Cheeks c.1692	Charming Jenny c.1680	Old Morocco Mare*

* Flying Childers is inbred 3D × 4D to the stallion Spanker, meaning that he appears third generation and fourth generation on the dam side of his pedigree.

* Flying Childers is inbred 4D × 4D to the mare Old Morocco Mare, meaning that she appears twice in fourth generation on the dam side of his pedigree.

== See also ==
- List of leading Thoroughbred racehorses

== Sources ==
- Whyte, James Christie (1840). History of the British turf, from the earliest period to the present day, Volume I. London: H. Colburn. p. 131. OL 6544990M.
- Flying Childers on Thoroughbred Heritage site
