= Bulle Rock =

18th-century English Thoroughbred stallion imported into North America

- Sire: Darley Arabian
- Dam: Byerley Turk mare
- Damsire: Byerley Turk
- Sex: Stallion
- Foaled: c. 1709
- Country: Great Britain
- Colour: Bay
- Owner: Earl of Huntingdon, Samuel Gist

Honours
- First Thoroughbred stallion imported to America

Bulle Rock (foaled c. 1709), sometimes referred to as Bulle Rocke or "Bullyrock", is thought to be the first English Thoroughbred stallion brought to the American Colonies, which would later become the United States. He was imported from England to America by a merchant mariner named James Patton in 1730, at the age of 21. James Patton was distantly related to equestrian and U.S. General George S. Patton (November 11, 1885 – December 21, 1945), with both being descendants of the Rev. William Thomas Patton (1590 – abt. 1641), who was born in Freuchie, Fife, Scotland, and later moved to Clonmany, County Donegal, Ireland.

Bulle Rock was reportedly a bay son of the Darley Arabian, and said to be out of a mare by the Byerley Turk, though his maternal lineage is questioned by some sources.

Bulle Rock is not mentioned in Britain's General Stud Book, which did not exist at the time of his birth, and, although the revised Volume 1 mentions some sons of the Darley Arabian, Bulle Rock is not among them, an omission possibly due to compiler James Weatherby having no knowledge of the dam. Pick's Turf Register references a Bullyrock, by the Darley Arabian, out of an "indifferent mare", which The Sportsman newspaper claims was "evidently the same horse" The name derives from 16th and 17th-century literature where it meant "boon companion". The term "my Bully Rooke" is used by Falstaff in Shakespeare's Merry Wives of Windsor.

"Bulle Rock" was also named after "Bull Rock", an outpoint of Dursey Island (Irish: Baoi Bhéarra or Oileán Baoi), which lies at the southwestern tip of the Beara Peninsula in the west of County Cork in Ireland. In Irish mythology, "Bull Rock" is associated with Donn ("the dark one", from Proto-Celtic: *Dhuosnos), an ancestor of the Gaels who is believed to have been a god of the dead.

Bulle Rock was foaled in England about 1709. Edgar's America Race-turf Register, Sportsman's Herald and General Stud Book of 1833 is credited with "preserving his fame" as other sources do not mention him until after this date. Edgar gives a birth date for Bulle Rock of 1718, a date repeated in the American Turf Register and Sporting Magazine of 1834, but given his race record occurred prior to that year, the 1709 date appears more credible. Later, Edgar seems to have conceded this error, requesting an amendment to the American Turf Register in 1835, concluding he must have been foaled "about the year 1707". Primary source information on the horse is scant. Contemporary advertisements could be found in old Virginia newspapers at one time, but by 1929, when Fairfax Harrison searched for them, these were lost.

During Bulle Rock's racing career in England, he was owned in part by the Earl of Huntingdon and part by Mr Metcalfe. His track career lasted six years, starting with the Ladies' Plate held at York in 1713, when he finished fourth, beaten by Careless. The following year, he finished second in the same race and in 1715 was second in two races, including the Royal Gold Cup at York, in which he was beaten by Brocklesby. He finally recorded a win in 1716, completing four heats of four miles each, winning two of them. He recorded a third-place finish in 1717 and a second in 1718.

Originally owned by James Patton, Bulle Rock was later sold to Samuel Gist of Hanover County, Virginia Colony. Bulle Rock was thought to be an older horse by the time he arrived in America, but still was mated to at least 39 English, Spanish, or Narragansett Pacer mares, and the fillies he got were in turn mated with other imported English Thoroughbred stallions. The latter included Messenger, who was imported in 1788, and Diomed, who was imported in 1798. His reputation was made by the descendants of one of his daughters, who was owned by the Belair Stud.

== Sources ==
- Harrison, Fairfax (1929). The Belair Stud 1747–1767. The Old Dominion.
