= 1780 in sports =

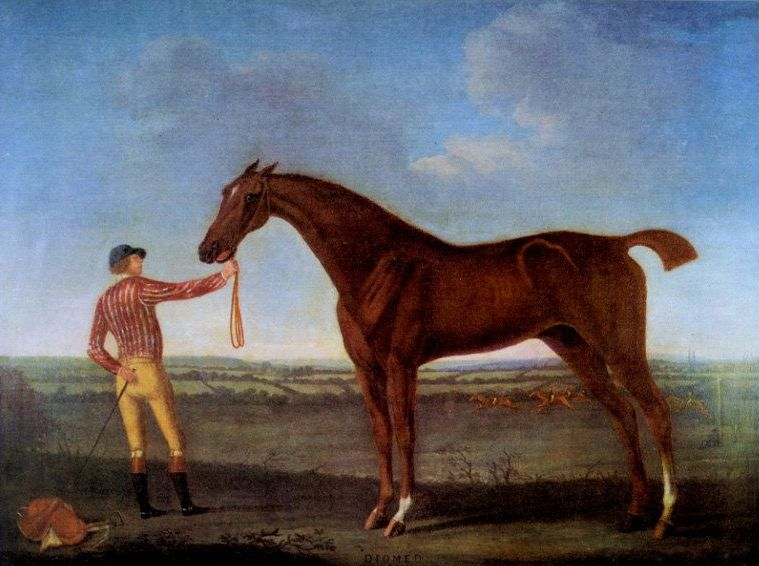
Diomed won the inaugural running of The Derby

1780 in sports describes the year's events in world sport.

== Boxing ==
Events

- It was probably during this year that Harry Sellers reclaimed the vacant English Championship but he is not known to have defended it before 1785.
- Unknown date - A three-day horse racing event is held in Hempstead Plains on Long Island, USA. The event includes a women's class.

== Cricket ==
Events

- Duke & Son of Penshurst made the first-ever six-seam cricket ball.

England

- Most runs – Joseph Miller and James Aylward 142
- Most wickets – Lumpy Stevens 18

== Horse racing ==
Events

- Inaugural running of The Derby, sometimes called the Epsom Derby for differentiation purposes, on Epsom Downs. The third-oldest of the five British Classic Races, the race is named after its founder, the 12th Earl of Derby.

England

- The Derby – Diomed
- The Oaks – Tetotum
- St Leger Stakes – Ruler
