= 1802 in sports =

1802 in sports describes the year's events in world sport.

== Boxing ==
Events

- 20 August — Jem Belcher successfully defends his English title by defeating Joe Berks in 13 rounds at "Hanover Spa" in London.

== Cricket ==
Events

- E. H. Budd makes his debut in first-class cricket.

England

- Most runs – Lord Frederick Beauclerk 106 (HS 54)
- Most wickets – Lord Frederick Beauclerk 7

== Horse racing ==
England

- The Derby – Tyrant
- The Oaks – Scotia
- St Leger Stakes – Orville
