= Blank (horse) =

British Thoroughbred racehorse

- Sire: Godolphin Arabian
- Dam: Amorett
- Damsire: Bartlett's Childers
- Sex: Stallion
- Foaled: 1740
- Country: Great Britain
- Colour: Bay
- Breeder: 2nd Earl of Godolphin
- Owner: Mr. Greville; Mr. Haydon; 3rd Duke of Ancaster
- Record: 1 win

Awards
- Leading sire in Great Britain and Ireland (1762, 1764, 1770)

Blank (1740–1770) was a British Thoroughbred racehorse and sire. He only won one race, but became a very successful sire and was British Champion sire in 1762, 1764 and 1770.

== Background ==
Blank was a bay colt bred by the 2nd Earl of Godolphin and foaled in 1740. He was sired by Godolphin Arabian, who was an Arabian horse and three-time Champion sire. Amongst Godolphin Arabian's other progeny were Lath, Cade, and Regulus. Blank's dam was Little Mare, also known as Amorett, who was a daughter of Flying Wigg.

== Racing career ==
Blank made his racecourse debut aged six at Newmarket in April 1746. He rarely raced and only won one race, which was a match race over three miles against Cumberland in 1748 at Newmarket.

== Stud career ==
After retiring from racing Blank became a very successful stallion and was British Champion sire in 1762, 1764 and 1770. He stood at Grimsthorpe in Lincolnshire and his best racing progeny included Ancaster, Great Subscription Purse and 1200 Guineas Stakes winner Antinous, Doncaster Cup winner Charlotte, another Great Subscription Purse winner Chatsworth, Chrysolite, Contest, 1200 Guineas Stakes winner Foxhunter, Hyder Ally, Lycurgas, Manby, Pacolet, Jockey Club Plate winner Paymaster, and Tatler. His daughter Rachel was the dam of Highflyer. Blank was also the damsire of Delpini, Goldfinder, Juniper and Young Marske. Blank died at Grimsthorpe in 1770.

== Sire line tree ==
- Blank
  - Contest
  - Tatler
  - Foxhunter
  - Manby
  - Antinous
    - Lamplighter
    - Givens
  - Centinel
  - Fallower
  - Granby
  - Chatsworth
  - Chrysolite
  - Pacolet
    - Citizen
      - Pacolet
  - Hyder Alley
  - Paymaster
    - Highlander (Brown)
    - Young Paymaster
      - King William
    - Paymaster
      - Rodney
    - Paragon
  - Lycurgus
  - Ancaster

== Pedigree ==
Pedigree of Blank, bay stallion, 1740
Sire Godolphin Arabian br. c.1724	(unknown)	(unknown)	(unknown)
Sire Godolphin Arabian br. c.1724	(unknown)	(unknown)	(unknown)
Sire Godolphin Arabian br. c.1724	(unknown)	(unknown)	(unknown)
Sire Godolphin Arabian br. c.1724	(unknown)	(unknown)	(unknown)
Sire Godolphin Arabian br. c.1724	(unknown)	(unknown)	(unknown)
Sire Godolphin Arabian br. c.1724	(unknown)	(unknown)	(unknown)
Sire Godolphin Arabian br. c.1724	(unknown)	(unknown)	(unknown)
Sire Godolphin Arabian br. c.1724	(unknown)	(unknown)	(unknown)
Dam Little Mare	Bartlett's Childers b. 1716	Darley Arabian b. c.1700	(unknown)
Dam Little Mare	Bartlett's Childers b. 1716	Darley Arabian b. c.1700	(unknown)
Dam Little Mare	Bartlett's Childers b. 1716	Betty Leedes	Old Careless
Dam Little Mare	Bartlett's Childers b. 1716	Betty Leedes	Sister to Leedes
Dam Little Mare	Flying Whig; 1721	Woodstock Arabian	(unknown)
Dam Little Mare	Flying Whig; 1721	Woodstock Arabian	(unknown)
Dam Little Mare	Flying Whig; 1721	Points	St. Victor's Barb
Dam Little Mare	Flying Whig; 1721	Points	Grey Whynot

Note: b. = Bay, br. = Brown
