= Ruler (horse) =

British Thoroughbred racehorse

- Sire: Young Marske
- Grandsire: Marske
- Dam: Flora
- Damsire: Lofty
- Sex: Stallion
- Foaled: 1777
- Country: Great Britain
- Colour: Bay
- Breeder: William Bethell
- Owner: William Bethell
- Record: 5: 3-0-1

Major wins
- St. Leger Stakes (1780)

Ruler (1777 – 4 February 1806) was a British Thoroughbred racehorse. He won three of his five starts, including the two-mile St. Leger Stakes in 1780. He was bred and owned by William Bethell.

== Background ==
Ruler was a bay colt bred by William Bethell and foaled in 1777. He was sired by Young Marske, who won his only race and later became a successful stallion. Ruler was the second foal of Flora, a daughter of Lofty.

== Racing career ==
Ruler's first race was at Hunmanby on 24 May 1780, when he started as the odds-on favourite for a sweepstakes of 25 guineas each. He won the race, beating Foxhuntoribus, Young Ragman, Young Hyder and one other. On 27 September, he started at the price of 5/2 for the two-mile St. Leger Stakes at Doncaster. He beat Mr. Stapleton's Antagonist (the 4/6 favourite), Lord Scarbrough's brother to Ovid, Lord Rockingham's chestnut colt, Sir John Lister Kaye's Zodiac and Colonel St. Leger's chestnut colt to win the race. His only start in 1781 was at York, where he finished third behind Fortitude and Arske. In May 1781 he beat Laura and Junior to win £50 at Hunmanby. At the York August meeting he faced Thornville, Regent and Laura in a subscription of 25 guineas each run over four miles. He looked likely to win, but dislocated his fetlock and had to be retired from racing.

== Stud career ==
Ruler stood as a stallion for John Pratt until his death in 1785. Ruler then purchased by Mark Bulmer and stood at Middleham in Yorkshire. He stud fee was initially two guineas and two shilling for the groom, but after some early success it was raised to five guineas and five shillings in 1791. In 1796, 1797 and 1798 he commanded a fee of eight and a half guineas, before returning to five guineas and five shillings in 1799. Ruler died on 4 February 1806 at Wyton in the East Riding of Yorkshire, where he had moved to after 1800. He sired a good number of winners, including Governor, High Eagle, Minikin, Mittimus, Pencil, Phalanx, Sober Robin and Weathercock. One of Ruler's unnamed daughters foaled Miss Nancy, who was the dam of The Duchess. The Duchess won the St. Leger in 1816 and Ruler also sired the dam of York Royal Plate winner Sweetwilliam.

== Pedigree ==
Pedigree of Ruler, bay stallion, 1777
Sire Young Marske (GB) b. 1771	Marske (GB) br. 1750	Squirt ch. 1732	Bartlett's Childers
Sire Young Marske (GB) b. 1771	Marske (GB) br. 1750	Squirt ch. 1732	Snake mare
Sire Young Marske (GB) b. 1771	Marske (GB) br. 1750	Blacklegs mare	Blacklegs
Sire Young Marske (GB) b. 1771	Marske (GB) br. 1750	Blacklegs mare	Bay Bolton mare
Sire Young Marske (GB) b. 1771	Blank mare (GB) ch. 1759	Blank b. 1740	Godolphin Arabian*
Sire Young Marske (GB) b. 1771	Blank mare (GB) ch. 1759	Blank b. 1740	Little Hartley Mare
Sire Young Marske (GB) b. 1771	Blank mare (GB) ch. 1759	Bay Starling	Bolton Starling
Sire Young Marske (GB) b. 1771	Blank mare (GB) ch. 1759	Bay Starling	Meynell
Dam Flora (GB) ch. 1765	Lofty (GB) b. 1753	Godolphin Arabian*	(unknown)
Dam Flora (GB) ch. 1765	Lofty (GB) b. 1753	Godolphin Arabian*	(unknown)
Dam Flora (GB) ch. 1765	Lofty (GB) b. 1753	Spinster ch. 1735	Partner
Dam Flora (GB) ch. 1765	Lofty (GB) b. 1753	Spinster ch. 1735	Bay Bloody Buttocks
Dam Flora (GB) ch. 1765	Riot (GB); 1753	Regulus; 1739	Godolphin Arabian*
Dam Flora (GB) ch. 1765	Riot (GB); 1753	Regulus; 1739	Grey Robinson
Dam Flora (GB) ch. 1765	Riot (GB); 1753	Blaze mare	Blaze
Dam Flora (GB) ch. 1765	Riot (GB); 1753	Blaze mare	Fox mare

Note: b. = Bay, br. = Brown, ch. = Chestnut

* Ruler is inbred 4S x 3D x 4D to the stallion Godolphin Arabian, meaning that he appears fourth generation once on the sire side of his pedigree, and third generation and fourth generation once each on the dam side of his pedigree.
