= Thoulouse Barb =

Thoroughbred foundation sire

The Thoulouse Barb was a foundation sire of the Thoroughbred breed. Along with Curwen's Bay Barb he was given as a present to Louis XIV by the King of Morocco. They were then purchased and imported to England in 1698 by Henry Curwen. He was later owned by Sir J. Parsons.

The Thoulouse Barb was the leading sire in Great Britain and Ireland in 1723. His most famous offspring were the sire Tifter, as well as the undefeated mare Molly. His daughter, the Ryegate Mare, was the dam of Cinnamon.

Through one of Tifter's daughters he in an ancestor of Virgil, who was leading sire in North America in 1885. Through another Tifter mare he is an ancestor of the sires Birdcatcher, who was the leading sire in Great Britain and Ireland twice, and Harkaway.

== Sire line tree ==
- Thoulouse Barb
  - Tifter
    - Scarborough Colt
      - Sportsman
      - Cumberland
