= Bartlett's Childers =

British Thoroughbred sire

- Sire: Darley Arabian
- Dam: Betty Leedes
- Damsire: Old Careless
- Sex: Stallion
- Foaled: 1716
- Country: Great Britain
- Colour: Bay
- Breeder: Leonard Childers
- Owner: John Bartlett
- Record: unraced

Awards
- Leading sire in Great Britain and Ireland (1742)

Bartlett's Childers (originally known as Young Childers or Bleeding Childers; foaled 1716) was an important Thoroughbred sire in the 18th century.

== Background ==
Bartlett's Childers was foaled in 1716. Bred by Leonard Childers, he was a son of the Darley Arabian and Betty Leedes. He was a full-brother to the undefeated Flying Childers, but was never trained to race. It was once thought that Betty Leedes only produced Flying Childers and a foal that died young, but it is now strongly believed that she did produce another foal by the Darley Arabian (Bartlett's Childers). He was known as "Bleeding Childers" as he frequently bled from his nose. He was sold by Mr Bartlett of Nutwith Cote, near Masham, Yorkshire.

== Stud career ==
Bartlett's Childers stood in Masham, Yorkshire. Through his success as a stallion he showed breeders that unraced horses were capable of siring top racehorses. He became champion sire in 1742. His progeny included Smales's Childers, Grey Childers, Squirt, Coughing Polly and Hartley's Little Mare. Squirt was the sire of Marske and Syphon. Hartley's Little mare was the dam of a number of top horses including Blank (who also became a champion sire) and Shakespear. Marske sired the undefeated racehorse Eclipse. Through Eclipse, his is the dominant sire line of thoroughbreds in modern times.

== Sire line tree ==
- Childers (Bartlett)
  - Childers (Smales)
    - Turpin
  - Grey Childers (Portmore)
  - Merry Andrew
  - Squirt
    - Marske
      - Eclipse
        - Planet
        - Potoooooooo
        - Jupiter
        - Satellite
        - King Fergus
        - Vertumnus
        - Bourdrow
        - Obscurity
        - Joe Andrews
        - Mercury
        - Young Eclipse
        - Dungannon
        - Saltram
        - Volunteer
        - Serjeant
        - Alexander
        - Meteor
        - Don Quixote
        - Pegasus
        - Brush
      - Transit
      - Hephestion
      - Mungo (Leviathan)
      - Narcissus
      - Pretender
        - Longitude
        - Pretender
        - No Pretender
        - Pandolpho
      - Shark
      - Young Marske
        - Ruler
        - Prince Lee Boo
        - Abba Thule
        - Spanker
        - Shuttle
      - Garrick (Hyperion)
        - Roscius
        - Sulky
      - Pontac
        - Sir Thomas
      - Jocundo
    - Syphon
      - Tippler
      - Daisy
      - Sweetwilliam
        - Captain Plume
        - Phoenix
      - Tosspot
      - Sweetbriar
        - Chocolate
        - Assassin
      - Tipsey
      - Enterprise
      - Pastor
      - Clown
      - Streamer
      - Tandem
        - Creeper
      - Gallantry
    - Tim
  - Fig

== Pedigree ==
Pedigree of Childers (Bartlett), bay stallion, 1716
Sire Darley Arabian b. c.1700	(unknown)	(unknown)	(unknown)
Sire Darley Arabian b. c.1700	(unknown)	(unknown)	(unknown)
Sire Darley Arabian b. c.1700	(unknown)	(unknown)	(unknown)
Sire Darley Arabian b. c.1700	(unknown)	(unknown)	(unknown)
Sire Darley Arabian b. c.1700	(unknown)	(unknown)	(unknown)
Sire Darley Arabian b. c.1700	(unknown)	(unknown)	(unknown)
Sire Darley Arabian b. c.1700	(unknown)	(unknown)	(unknown)
Sire Darley Arabian b. c.1700	(unknown)	(unknown)	(unknown)
Dam Betty Leedes c.1702	Old Careless c.1692	Spanker* b. c.1670	D'Arcy Yellow Turk
Dam Betty Leedes c.1702	Old Careless c.1692	Spanker* b. c.1670	Old Morocco Mare*
Dam Betty Leedes c.1702	Old Careless c.1692	Barb mare c.1682	(unknown)
Dam Betty Leedes c.1702	Old Careless c.1692	Barb mare c.1682	(unknown)
Dam Betty Leedes c.1702	Cream Cheeks c.1692	Leedes Arabian blk. c.1685	(unknown)
Dam Betty Leedes c.1702	Cream Cheeks c.1692	Leedes Arabian blk. c.1685	(unknown)
Dam Betty Leedes c.1702	Cream Cheeks c.1692	Charming Jenny c.1680	Spanker*
Dam Betty Leedes c.1702	Cream Cheeks c.1692	Charming Jenny c.1680	Old Morocco Mare*

* Bartlett's Childers is inbred 3D × 4D to the stallion Spanker, meaning that he appears third generation and fourth generation on the dam side of his pedigree.

* Bartlett's Childers is inbred 4D × 4D to the mare Old Morocco Mare, meaning that she appears twice in fourth generation on the dam side of his pedigree.
