= Leading sire in Great Britain and Ireland =

Racehorse award in Great Britain and Ireland

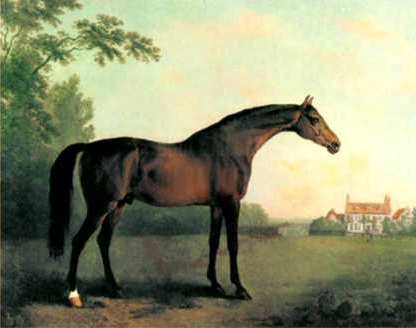
Highflyer, who was champion sire 13 times

The title of champion, or leading, sire of racehorses in Great Britain and Ireland is awarded to the stallion whose offspring have won the most prize money in Britain and Ireland during the flat racing season. The current (2025) champion is Night of Thunder.

Unlike the similar title for leading sire in North America, the stallion in question does not need to have resided in Great Britain or Ireland during his stud career, although the vast majority have done so. Northern Dancer is the most notable example of a North American-based stallion who won this title. The Northern Dancer sire line has dominated the list for the last several decades, mostly through his son Sadler's Wells (14 titles) and grandson Galileo (12 titles).

The 2016 novel Mount! by Jilly Cooper describes the process to gain the fictional title for global leading sire.

== Records ==
Most championships:

- 14 – Sadler's Wells – 1990, 1992–2004
- 13 – Highflyer – 1785–1796, 1798
- 12 – Galileo – 2008, 2010–2020
- 10 – Sir Peter Teazle – 1799–1802, 1804–1809
- 9 – St. Simon – 1890–1896, 1900–1901
- 8 – Regulus – 1754–1757, 1761, 1763, 1765–1766; Herod – 1777–1784

== Champion sires 1721–1997 ==
- 1721 – Acaster Turk (1)
- 1722 – Darley Arabian (1)
- 1723 – Thoulouse Barb (1)
- 1724 – Bay Bolton (1)
- 1725 – Bald Galloway (1)
- 1726 – Bay Bolton (2)
- 1727 – Bay Bolton (3)
- 1728 – Alcock's Arabian (1)
- 1729 – Bay Bolton (4)
- 1730 – Flying Childers (1)
- 1731 – Fox (1)
- 1732 – Bay Bolton (5)
- 1733 – Bay Bolton (6)
- 1734 – Bay Bolton (7)
- 1735 – Fox (2)
- 1736 – Flying Childers (2)
- 1737 – Partner (1)
- 1738 – Godolphin Arabian (1)
- 1739 – Bloody Buttocks (1)
- 1740 – Partner (2)
- 1741 – Partner (3)
- 1742 – Bartlett's Childers (1)
- 1743 – Partner (4)
- 1744 – Bolton Starling (1)
- 1745 – Godolphin Arabian (2)
- 1746 – Blacklegs (1)
- 1747 – Godolphin Arabian (3)
- 1748 – Crab (1)
- 1749 – Crab (2)
- 1750 – Crab (3)
- 1751 – Blaze (1)
- 1752 – Cade (1)
- 1753 – Cade (2)
- 1754 – Regulus (1)
- 1755 – Regulus (2)
- 1756 – Regulus (3)
- 1757 – Regulus (4)
- 1758 – Cade (3)
- 1759 – Cade (4)
- 1760 – Cade (5)
- 1761 – Regulus (5)
- 1762 – Blank (1)
- 1763 – Regulus (6)
- 1764 – Blank (2)
- 1765 – Regulus (7)
- 1766 – Regulus (8)
- 1767 – Snap (1)
- 1768 – Snap (2)
- 1769 – Snap (3)
- 1770 – Blank (3)
- 1771 – Snap (4)
- 1772 – Matchem (1)
- 1773 – Matchem (2)
- 1774 – Matchem (3)
- 1775 – Marske (1)
- 1776 – Marske (2)
- 1777 – Herod (1)
- 1778 – Herod (2)
- 1779 – Herod (3)
- 1780 – Herod (4)
- 1781 – Herod (5)
- 1782 – Herod (6)
- 1783 – Herod (7)
- 1784 – Herod (8)
- 1785 – Highflyer (1)
- 1786 – Highflyer (2)
- 1787 – Highflyer (3)
- 1788 – Highflyer (4)
- 1789 – Highflyer (5)
- 1790 – Highflyer (6)
- 1791 – Highflyer (7)
- 1792 – Highflyer (8)
- 1793 – Highflyer (9)
- 1794 – Highflyer (10)
- 1795 – Highflyer (11)
- 1796 – Highflyer (12)
- 1797 – King Fergus (1)
- 1798 – Highflyer (13)
- 1799 – Sir Peter Teazle (1)
- 1800 – Sir Peter Teazle (2)
- 1801 – Sir Peter Teazle (3)
- 1802 – Sir Peter Teazle (4)
- 1803 – Trumpator (1)
- 1804 – Sir Peter Teazle (5)
- 1805 – Sir Peter Teazle (6)
- 1806 – Sir Peter Teazle (7)
- 1807 – Sir Peter Teazle (8)
- 1808 – Sir Peter Teazle (9)
- 1809 – Sir Peter Teazle (10)
- 1810 – Waxy (1)
- 1811 – Sorcerer (1)
- 1812 – Sorcerer (2)
- 1813 – Sorcerer (3)
- 1814 – Selim (1)
- 1815 – Rubens (1)
- 1816 – Walton (1)
- 1817 – Orville (1)
- 1818 – Walton (2)
- 1819 – Soothsayer (1)
- 1820 – Phantom (1)
- 1821 – Rubens (2)
- 1822 – Rubens (3)
- 1823 – Orville (2)
- 1824 – Phantom (2)
- 1825 – Election (1)
- 1826 – Whalebone (1)
- 1827 – Whalebone (2)
- 1828 – Filho da Puta (1)
- 1829 – Blacklock (1)
- 1830 – Emilius (1)
- 1831 – Emilius (2)
- 1832 – Sultan (1)
- 1833 – Sultan (2)
- 1834 – Sultan (3)
- 1835 – Sultan (4)
- 1836 – Sultan (5)
- 1837 – Sultan (6)
- 1838 – Camel (1)
- 1839 – Priam (1)
- 1840 – Priam (2)
- 1841 – Taurus (1)
- 1842 – Touchstone (1)
- 1843 – Touchstone (2)
- 1844 – Bay Middleton (1)
- 1845 – Slane (1)
- 1846 – Venison (1)
- 1847 – Venison (2)
- 1848 – Touchstone (3)
- 1849 – Bay Middleton (2)
- 1850 – Epirus (1)
- 1851 – Orlando (1)
- 1852 – Birdcatcher (1)
- 1853 – Melbourne (1)
- 1854 – Orlando (2)
- 1855 – Touchstone (4)
- 1856 – Birdcatcher (2)
- 1857 – Melbourne (2)
- 1858 – Orlando (3)
- 1859 – Newminster (1)
- 1860 – Stockwell (1)
- 1861 – Stockwell (2)
- 1862 – Stockwell (3)
- 1863 – Newminster (2)
- 1864 – Stockwell (4)
- 1865 – Stockwell (5)
- 1866 – Stockwell (6)
- 1867 – Stockwell (7)
- 1868 – Buccaneer (1)
- 1869 – Thormanby (1)
- 1870 – King Tom (1)
- 1871 – King Tom (2)
- 1872 – Blair Athol (1)
- 1873 – Blair Athol (2)
- 1874 – Adventurer (1)
- 1875 – Blair Athol (3)
- 1876 – Lord Clifden (1)
- 1877 – Blair Athol (4)
- 1878 – Speculum (1)
- 1879 – Flageolet (1)
- 1880 – Hermit (1)
- 1881 – Hermit (2)
- 1882 – Hermit (3)
- 1883 – Hermit (4)
- 1884 – Hermit (5)
- 1885 – Hermit (6)
- 1886 – Hermit (7)
- 1887 – Hampton (1)
- 1888 – Galopin (1)
- 1889 – Galopin (2)
- 1890 – St. Simon (1)
- 1891 – St. Simon (2)
- 1892 – St. Simon (3)
- 1893 – St. Simon (4)
- 1894 – St. Simon (5)
- 1895 – St. Simon (6)
- 1896 – St. Simon (7)
- 1897 – Kendal (1)
- 1898 – Galopin (3)
- 1899 – Orme (1)
- 1900 – St. Simon (8)
- 1901 – St. Simon (9)
- 1902 – Persimmon (1)
- 1903 – St. Frusquin (1)
- 1904 – Gallinule (1)
- 1905 – Gallinule (2)
- 1906 – Persimmon (1)
- 1907 – St. Frusquin (1)
- 1908 – Persimmon (2)
- 1909 – Cyllene (1)
- 1910 – Cyllene (2)
- 1911 – Sundridge (1)
- 1912 – Persimmon (3)
- 1913 – Desmond (1)
- 1914 – Polymelus (1)
- 1915 – Polymelus (2)
- 1916 – Polymelus (3)
- 1917 – Bayardo (1)
- 1918 – Bayardo (2)
- 1919 – The Tetrarch (1)
- 1920 – Polymelus (4)
- 1921 – Polymelus (5)
- 1922 – Lemberg (1)
- 1923 – Swynford (1)
- 1924 – Son-in-Law (1)
- 1925 – Phalaris (1)
- 1926 – Hurry On (1)
- 1927 – Buchan (1)
- 1928 – Phalaris (2)
- 1929 – Tetratema (1)
- 1930 – Son-in-Law (2)
- 1931 – Pharos (1)
- 1932 – Gainsborough (1)
- 1933 – Gainsborough (2)
- 1934 – Blandford (1)
- 1935 – Blandford (2)
- 1936 – Fairway (1)
- 1937 – Solario (1)
- 1938 – Blandford (3)
- 1939 – Fairway (2)
- 1940 – Hyperion (1)
- 1941 – Hyperion (2)
- 1942 – Hyperion (3)
- 1943 – Fairway (3)
- 1944 – Fairway (4)
- 1945 – Hyperion (4)
- 1946 – Hyperion (5)
- 1947 – Nearco (1)
- 1948 – Big Game (1)
- 1949 – Nearco (2)
- 1950 – Fair Trial (1)
- 1951 – Nasrullah (1)
- 1952 – Tehran (1)
- 1953 – Chanteur (1)
- 1954 – Hyperion (6)
- 1955 – Alycidon (1)
- 1956 – Court Martial (1)
- 1957 – Court Martial (2)
- 1958 – Mossborough (1)
- 1959 – Petition (1)
- 1960 – Aureole (1)
- 1961 – Aureole (2)
- 1962 – Never Say Die (1)
- 1963 – Ribot (1)
- 1964 – Chamossaire (1)
- 1965 – Court Harwell (1)
- 1966 – Charlottesville (1)
- 1967 – Ribot (2)
- 1968 – Ribot (3)
- 1969 – Crepello (1)
- 1970 – Northern Dancer (1)
- 1971 – Never Bend (1)
- 1972 – Queen's Hussar (1)
- 1973 – Vaguely Noble (1)
- 1974 – Vaguely Noble (2)
- 1975 – Great Nephew (1)
- 1976 – Wolver Hollow (1)
- 1977 – Northern Dancer (2)
- 1978 – Mill Reef (1)
- 1979 – Petingo (1)
- 1980 – Pitcairn (1)
- 1981 – Great Nephew (1)
- 1982 – Be My Guest (1)
- 1983 – Northern Dancer (3)
- 1984 – Northern Dancer (4)
- 1985 – Kris (1)
- 1986 – Nijinsky (1)
- 1987 – Mill Reef (2)
- 1988 – Caerleon (1)
- 1989 – Blushing Groom (1)
- 1990 – Sadler's Wells (1)
- 1991 – Caerleon (2)
- 1992 – Sadler's Wells (2)
- 1993 – Sadler's Wells (3)
- 1994 – Sadler's Wells (4)
- 1995 – Sadler's Wells (5)
- 1996 – Sadler's Wells (6)
- 1997 – Sadler's Wells (7)

== Champion sires since 1998 ==
Year	Champion stallion	Winning horses	Total wins	Total prize money	Leading earner	Runner-up stallion	Ref.
1998	Sadler's Wells (8)	41	54	£1,594,536	Dream Well	Alzao
1999	Sadler's Wells (9)	44	57	£1,921,619	Montjeu	Fairy King
2000	Sadler's Wells (10)	56	78	£2,483,888	Montjeu	Storm Cat
2001	Sadler's Wells (11)	60	81	£4,068,991	Galileo	Danehill
2002	Sadler's Wells (12)	67	87	£3,625,423	High Chaparral	Danehill
2003	Sadler's Wells (13)	80	104	£3,455,160	High Chaparral	Danehill
2004	Sadler's Wells (14)	83	104	£4,044,565	Doyen	Danehill
2005	Danehill (1)	68	97	£3,487,488	Oratorio	Montjeu
2006	Danehill (2)	65	92	£3,579,413	Dylan Thomas	Danehill Dancer
2007	Danehill (3)	57	81	£3,751,607	Dylan Thomas	Galileo
2008	Galileo (1)	61	86	£3,974,492	New Approach	Danehill Dancer
2009	Danehill Dancer (1)	91	119	£3,827,297	Mastercraftsman	Cape Cross
2010	Galileo (2)	66	89	£4,943,102	Cape Blanco	Dansili
2011	Galileo (3)	90	121	£5,283,068	Frankel	Montjeu
2012	Galileo (4)	108	154	£5,774,558	Frankel	Montjeu
2013	Galileo (5)	115	162	£4,733,222	Ruler of the World	Dubawi
2014	Galileo (6)	119	146	£7,193,916	Australia	Invincible Spirit
2015	Galileo (7)	91	120	£5,735,195	Found	Dubawi
2016	Galileo (8)	104	143	£10,489,764	Highland Reel	Dubawi
2017	Galileo (9)	113		£11,698,680 (Note: £15,145,613 in Europe)	Ulysses	Dubawi
2018	Galileo (10)	89	125	£6,680,143		Dubawi
2019	Galileo (11)	82	124	£11,945,529 (Note: £16,145,540 in Europe)	Waldgeist	Sea the Stars
2020	Galileo (12)	85	116	£5,274,968	Magical	Dubawi
2021	Frankel (1)	87	144	£5,232,910	Adayar	Galileo
2022	Dubawi (1)	99	152	£6,419,420	Naval Crown	Frankel
2023	Frankel (2)	87	124	£7,066,134	Westover	Dark Angel
2024	Dark Angel (1)	100	161	£4,970,854	Charyn	Dubawi
2025	Night of Thunder (1)	95	175	£6,780,629	Ombudsman	Wootton Bassett

== Top sire lines ==
Excluding any championships by the foundation stallions themselves, the following sire-lines have produced champion sires (1721–2016):

- Darley Arabian – 88 stallions, 188 championships. all titles since 1964
- Byerley Turk – 17 stallions, 59 championships, most recently Tetratema in 1929
- Godolphin Arabian – 12 stallions, 32 championships, most recently Chamossaire in 1964
- D'Arcy White Turk – 3 stallions, 10 championships, most recently Bolton Starling in 1744
- Curwen's Bay Barb – 2 stallions, 4 championships, most recently Crab in 1750
- Acaster Turk, Bloody Buttocks, St. Victor's Barb, Thoulouse Barb – 1 championship each

Sire lines and selected dam lines of the leading sires, color-coded by sire line

Thoulouse Barb; 1723
D'Arcy White Turk	Tifter
Hautboy	Scarborough Colt
Acaster Turk; 1721	Curwen's Bay Barb	St. Victor's Barb	Byerley Turk	Clumsey	Grey Hautboy	Scarborough mare
Acaster Turk mare	Alcock's Arabian; 1728	Darley Arabian; 1722	Bloody Buttocks; 1739	Bald Galloway; 1725	Sister to Mixbury	Jigg	Fox; 1731, 1735	Bay Bolton; 1724, 1726; 1727, 1729; 1732, 1733; 1734	Sister to Antelope
Easby Snake	Crab; 1748, 1749; 1750	Bartlett's Childers; 1742	Flying Childers; 1730, 1736	Grey Bloody Buttocks	Grey Robinson	Godolphin Arabian; 1738, 1745; 1747	Roxana	Partner; 1737, 1740; 1741	Meloria	Bolton Starling; 1744	Coalition Colt
Mother Western	Squirt	Blacklegs; 1746	Blaze; 1751	Snip	Regulus; 1754, 1755; 1756, 1757; 1761, 1763; 1765, 1766	Blank; 1762, 1764; 1770	Cade; 1752, 1753; 1758, 1759; 1760	Sister to Miss Partner	Tartar	Coalition Colt mare
Othello	Marske; 1775, 1776	Spilletta	Squirrel	Matchem; 1772, 1773; 1774	Herod; 1777, 1778; 1779, 1780; 1781, 1782; 1783, 1784	Grecian Princess
Creeping Polly	Eclipse	Snap; 1767, 1768, 1769, 1771	Brunette	Conductor	Woodpecker	Highflyer; 1785, 1786; 1787, 1788; 1789, 1790; 1791, 1792; 1793, 1794; 1795, 1796; 1798	Alexander
King Fergus; 1797	Potoooooooo	Mercury	Trumpator; 1803	Buzzard	Alexander mare	Sir Peter Teazle; 1799, 1800; 1801, 1802; 1804, 1805; 1806, 1807; 1808, 1809
Hambletonian	Beningbrough	Waxy; 1810	Gohanna	Sorcerer; 1811, 1812, 1813	Selim; 1814	Rubens; 1815, 1821, 1822	Castrel	Walton; 1816, 1818	Haphazard	Sir Paul
Whitelock	Orville; 1817, 1823	Whisker	Whalebone; 1826, 1827	Golumpus	Election; 1825	Soothsayer; 1819	Comus	Sultan; 1832, 1833; 1834, 1835; 1836, 1837	Pantaloon	Phantom; 1820, 1824	Filho da Puta; 1828	Paulowitz
Blacklock; 1829	Muley	Emilius; 1830, 1831	Economist	Camel; 1838	Catton	Sir Hercules	Humphrey; Clinker	Bay Middleton; 1844, 1849	Langar	Windhound	Partisan	Cain
Voltaire	Morisco	Priam; 1839, 1840	Harkaway	Touchstone; 1842, 1843; 1848, 1855	Royal Oak	Birdcatcher; 1852, 1856	The Flying Dutchman	Epirus; 1850	Venison; 1846, 1847	Ion
Taurus; 1841	Slane; 1845	The Baron	Oxford	Melbourne; 1853, 1857	Ellington	Thormanby; 1869	Wild Dayrell
Voltigeur	King Tom; 1870, 1871	Orlando; 1851, 1854, 1858	Newminster; 1859, 1863	Stockwell; 1860, 1861; 1862, 1864; 1865, 1866; 1867	West Australian	Delight	Atlantic	Buccaneer; 1868
Vedette	Trumpeter	Lord Clifden; 1876	Adventurer; 1874	Hermit; 1880, 1881; 1882, 1883; 1884, 1885; 1886	Blair Athol; 1872, 1873; 1875, 1877	Doncaster	Sterling	Solon	Le Sancy
Speculum; 1878	Galopin; 1888, 1889, 1898	Plutus	Hampton; 1887	Bend Or	Isonomy	Barcaldine	Le Samaritain
Rosebery	St. Simon; 1890, 1891; 1892, 1893; 1894, 1895; 1896, 1900; 1901	Flageolet; 1879	Bay Ronald	Bona Vista	Ormonde	Kendal; 1897	Gallinule; 1904, 1905	Isinglass	Marco
Amphion	Persimmon; 1902, 1906; 1908, 1912	St. Frusquin; 1903, 1907	Desmond; 1913	Dark Ronald	Bayardo; 1917, 1918	Cyllene; 1909, 1910	Orme; 1899	John o'Gaunt	Marcovil	Vahren	Roi Herode
Sundridge; 1911	Prince Palatine	Chaucer	Rabelais	Son-in-Law; 1924, 1930	Gainsborough; 1932, 1933	Polymelus; 1914, 1915; 1916, 1920; 1921	Lemberg; 1922	Captivation	Swynford; 1923	Hurry On; 1926	The Tetrarch; 1919
Sunstar	Rose Prince	Prince Chimay	Havresac	Hyperion; 1940, 1941; 1942, 1945; 1946, 1954	Solario; 1937	Phalaris; 1925, 1928	Kircubbin	Blandford; 1934, 1935; 1938	Precipitation	Tetratema; 1929
Buchan; 1927	Prince Rose	Vatout	Cavaliere d'Arpino	Aureole; 1960, 1961	Sickle	Pharos; 1931	Fairway; 1936, 1939; 1943, 1944	Chateau Bouscaut	Blenheim	Bahram	Chamossaire; 1964
Unbreakable	Prince Chevalier	Bois Roussel	Bellini	Vienna	Nearco; 1947, 1949	Fair Trial; 1950	Chanteur; 1953	Donatello	Big Game; 1948
Charlottesville; 1966	Court Harwell; 1965	Tehran; 1952	Tenerani	Nearctic	Mossborough; 1958	Nasrullah; 1951	Court Martial; 1956, 1957	Petition; 1959	Alycidon; 1955	Crepello; 1969
Polynesian	Ribot; 1963, 1967; 1968	Vaguely Noble; 1973, 1974	Northern Dancer; 1970, 1977; 1983, 1984	Never Bend; 1971	Never Say Die; 1962	Honeyway	March Past	Petingo; 1979
Native Dancer	Danzig	Sadler's Wells; 1990, 1992; 1993, 1994; 1995, 1996; 1997, 1998; 1999, 2000; 2001, 2002; 2003, 2004	Nijinsky; 1986	Be My Guest; 1982	Try My Best	Mill Reef; 1978, 1987	Wolver Hollow; 1976	Red God	Great Nephew; 1975, 1981	Queen's Hussar; 1972	Pitcairn; 1980
Raise a Native	Atan	Danehill; 2005, 2006; 2007	Galileo; 2008, 2010; 2011, 2012; 2013, 2014; 2015, 2016; 2017, 2018; 2019, 2020	Caerleon; 1988, 1991	Waajib	Blushing Groom; 1989
Mr. Prospector	Sharpen Up	Danehill Dancer; 2009	Frankel; 2021, 2023	Royal Applause
Seeking the Gold	Kris; 1985	Acclamation
Dubai Millennium	Dark Angel; 2024
Dubawi; 2022
Night of Thunder; 2025

== See also ==
- Leading sire in Australia
- Leading sire in France
- Leading sire in Germany
- Leading sire in Japan
- Leading sire in North America
- Leading broodmare sire in Great Britain & Ireland
- Leading broodmare sire in North America
- Leading jump racing sire in Great Britain & Ireland
