= Snip (horse) =

British Thoroughbred racehorse

- Sire: Flying Childers
- Grandsire: Darley Arabian
- Dam: Basto mare
- Damsire: Basto
- Sex: Stallion
- Foaled: 1736
- Country: Great Britain
- Colour: Brown
- Breeder: 3rd Duke of Devonshire
- Owner: 3rd Duke of Devonshire
- Record: 1 win

Snip (1736 – 8 May 1757) was a British Thoroughbred racehorse. He only won one race, but later became a successful sire. His son Snap was undefeated in his four races and became a multiple-time Champion sire. Snip was bred and owned by William Cavendish, 3rd Duke of Devonshire.

== Background ==
Snip was a brown colt bred by the 3rd Duke of Devonshire and foaled in 1736. He was sired by the undefeated racehorse and Champion sire Flying Childers, who also sired Blaze. Snip's dam was a daughter of Basto.

== Racing career ==
Snip's first race was in 1741 at Beccles in Suffolk, where he beat Thirkleby, Fancy and three others in a £50 race of two heats. He later raced at Newmarket, but was unsuccessful.

== Stud career ==
Despite his race record he apparently appealed to breeders due to his good conformation. He stood as a stallion at Kenton in Northumberland. He sired the undefeated Snap, who later became Champion sire four times. He also sired Prince T'Quassaw, Judgment, Fribble, Swiss and Havannah. Snip died on 8 May 1757 and was replaced at Kenton by his son Snap. Snap was the sire of Goldfinder, Juniper and Latham's Snap. He was also the damsire of Sir Peter Teazle.

== Sire line tree ==
- Snip
  - Snap
    - Snap (Hazard)
    - Omnium
      - Ovid
      - Xanthippus
      - Hippogriff
      - Omnium
    - Snap (Latham)
    - Lofty
    - Snap (Chedworth)
    - Mambruello
    - Snipe
    - Ancient Pistol
      - Ancient Pistol
      - Hardwicke
    - Goldfinder
      - Goldfinder
      - Molecatcher
    - Juniper
      - Young Juniper
      - Dromedary
    - Scaramouch
    - Mexican
  - Prince T'Quassaw
    - Tickler
    - Hottentot
  - Judgment
  - Fribble
  - Swiss
  - Young Snip
    - Ferdinando

== Pedigree ==
Pedigree of Snip, brown stallion, 1736
Sire Flying Childers (GB) 1715	Darley Arabian	(unknown)	(unknown)
Sire Flying Childers (GB) 1715	Darley Arabian	(unknown)	(unknown)
Sire Flying Childers (GB) 1715	Darley Arabian	(unknown)	(unknown)
Sire Flying Childers (GB) 1715	Darley Arabian	(unknown)	(unknown)
Sire Flying Childers (GB) 1715	Betty Leedes	Careless	Spanker
Sire Flying Childers (GB) 1715	Betty Leedes	Careless	Barb mare
Sire Flying Childers (GB) 1715	Betty Leedes	Leedes Arabian mare	Leedes Arabian*
Sire Flying Childers (GB) 1715	Betty Leedes	Leedes Arabian mare	Spanker mare
Dam Basto mare (GB)	Basto	Byerley Turk	(unknown)
Dam Basto mare (GB)	Basto	Byerley Turk	(unknown)
Dam Basto mare (GB)	Basto	Bay Peg	Leedes Arabian*
Dam Basto mare (GB)	Basto	Bay Peg	Spanker mare
Dam Basto mare (GB)	Curwen Bay Barb mare	Curwen's Bay Barb	(unknown)
Dam Basto mare (GB)	Curwen Bay Barb mare	Curwen's Bay Barb	(unknown)
Dam Basto mare (GB)	Curwen Bay Barb mare	Curwen Spot mare	Curwen Spot
Dam Basto mare (GB)	Curwen Bay Barb mare	Curwen Spot mare	White-legged Lowther Barb mare

Note: b. = Bay, br. = Brown, ch. = Chestnut

* Snip is inbred 4S × 4D to the stallion Leedes Arabian, meaning that he appears fourth generation on the sire side of his pedigree and fourth generation on the dam side of his pedigree.
