= Darley Arabian =

One of three dominant foundation sires

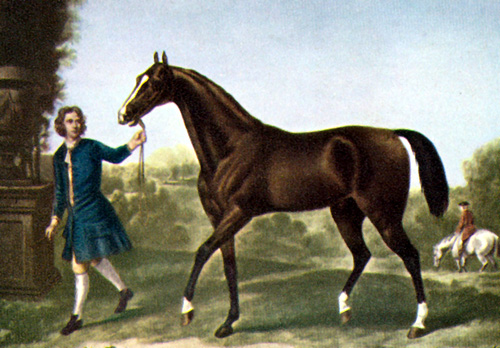
- The Darley Arabian stallion painting by John Wootton
- Sex: Stallion
- Foaled: c. 1700
- Died: 1730; Aldby Park; Yorkshire, England
- Colour: Bay
- Owner: Thomas Darley

Awards
- Leading sire in Great Britain and Ireland (1722)

The Darley Arabian (c. 1700–1730) was one of three dominant foundation sires of modern Thoroughbred horse racing bloodstock. The other two founders were the Godolphin Arabian and the Byerley Turk. This bay Arabian horse was bought in Aleppo, Syria, by Thomas Darley in 1704 and shipped to Aldby Park in England, as a present for his brother.

One author in 1840 described Darley Arabian's arrival in England during the reign of Queen Anne as the event which "forms the great epoch from which the history of the Turf [as in "turf racing"] should be dated".

There he stood at stud, usually private but sometimes open to outside mares. He was the leading sire in Great Britain and Ireland in 1722. By all accounts, the Darley Arabian stood about 15 hands high and was of substantial beauty and refinement.

The Darley Arabian sired the undefeated Flying Childers. He also sired Bartlett's Childers, an unraced brother of Flying Childers, who was the great-grandsire of the extremely influential Eclipse. The Darley Arabian was to become the most important sire in the history of the English Thoroughbred. His son Bulle Rock was the first Thoroughbred to be exported to America, in 1730.

Most Thoroughbreds can be traced back to Darley Arabian. In 95% of modern Thoroughbred racehorses, the Y chromosome can be traced back to this single stallion. This is mainly through his descendant, Eclipse, who is the direct male ancestor of 95% of all thoroughbreds and in the pedigree of many of the rest.

== Sire line tree ==
Descendants of the Darley Arabian (click to show)
- Darley Arabian
  - Manica
    - Stump
  - Whistlejacket
  - Cupid
  - Daedalus
  - Danger
  - Dart
  - Skipjack
    - Quintin
    - Croke
  - Bulle Rock
  - Aleppo
    - Hobgoblin
      - Phantom
      - Trimmer
      - Shakespeare
        - Pincher
    - Scrutineer
    - Spark
      - Pacolet
  - Brisk
    - Foxhunter (Cole)
      - Foxhunter (Chedworth)
  - Almanzor
    - Almanzor (Elstob)
    - Almanzor (Fleetwood)
    - Spinner
  - Smockface
  - Childers (Flying)
    - Childers (Hampton Court)
      - Tantrum
    - Blacklegs
    - Grey Childers (Chedworth)
    - Plaistow
    - Fleec'em
    - Second
      - Merlin
        - Young Merlin
        - Prospero
        - Petit Maitre
      - Leedes
      - Sharp
    - Spanking Roger
    - Blaze
      - Sampson
        - Engineer
        - Bay Malton
        - Pilgrim
        - Treasurer
        - Phocion
      - Childers
      - Grenadier
      - Scrub
      - Shales
        - Scot Shales
        - Driver
    - Hip
    - Roundhead
      - Roger of the Vale
      - Stadtholder
      - Joseph Andrews
    - Steady
    - Ball
    - Snip
      - Snap
        - Snap (Hazard)
        - Omnium
        - Snap (Latham)
        - Lofty
        - Snap (Chedworth)
        - Mambruello
        - Snipe
        - Ancient Pistol
        - Goldfinder
        - Juniper
        - Scaramouch
        - Mexican
      - Prince T'Quassaw
        - Tickler
        - Hottentot
      - Judgment
      - Fribble
      - Swiss
      - Young Snip
        - Ferdinando
  - Whitelegs
  - Childers (Bartlett)
    - Childers (Smales)
      - Turpin
    - Grey Childers (Portmore)
    - Merry Andrew
    - Squirt
      - Marske
        - Eclipse
        - Transit
        - Hephestion
        - Mungo (Leviathan)
        - Narcissus
        - Pretender
        - Shark
        - Young Marske
        - Garrick (Hyperion)
        - Pontac
        - Jocundo
      - Syphon
        - Tippler
        - Daisy
        - Sweetwilliam
        - Tosspot
        - Sweetbriar
        - Tipsey
        - Enterprise
        - Pastor
        - Clown
        - Streamer
        - Tandem
        - Gallantry
      - Tim
    - Fig
  - Wanton Willy
  - Gander

== See also ==
- List of racehorses
- Phaéton (trotter horse)
- Kentucky Derby winners descended from the Darley Arabian

== Bibliography ==
- Whyte, James Christie (1840). History of the British turf, from the earliest period to the present day, Volume I. London: H. Colburn. OL 6544990M.
- McGrath, Christopher (2016). Mr Darley's Arabian: High Life, Low Life, Sporting Life. Hodder & Stoughton.
- Church, Michael (2004). Champion Sires 1722-2003. Raceform Ltd. p. 319. ISBN 1-904317-82-0.
