= Marske (horse) =

British Thoroughbred racehorse

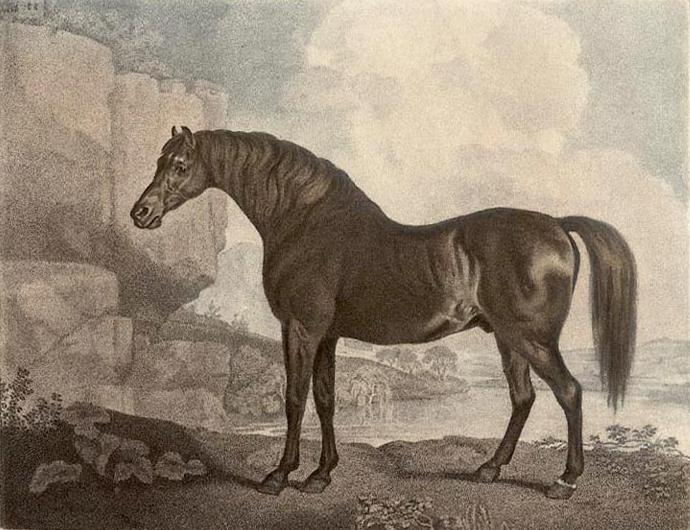
- Marske
- Sire: Squirt
- Grandsire: Bartlett's Childers
- Dam: The Rugby or Ruby Mare
- Damsire: Blacklegs
- Sex: Stallion
- Foaled: 1750
- Died: July 1779
- Country: Great Britain
- Colour: Bay
- Breeder: John Hutton
- Owner: Prince William, Duke of Cumberland, William Wildman, Willoughby Bertie, 4th Earl of Abingdon
- Record: 5: 2-0-1

Major wins
- Jockey Club Plate (1754)

Awards
- Leading sire in Great Britain and Ireland (1775, 1776)
- Last updated on August 25, 2007

Marske (1750 – July 1779) was a Thoroughbred racehorse, best known for siring the great Eclipse.

== Racing career ==
Bred by John Hutton at Marske Hall (Marske, Richmondshire), Yorkshire, he was traded to the Prince William, Duke of Cumberland (also the breeder and owner of Herod), as a foal for a chestnut Arabian.

In 1754 he won the Jockey Club Plate on Newmarket's Round Course against Pytho and Brilliant and a 300-guinea match against Ginger. The following year he came third in a race at Newmarket and did not run again until 1756, when he lost twice again, this time in two 1,000-guinea matches against Snap (by Snip). He was then retired to stud.

=== Summary ===
Date	Race name	Dist (miles)	Course	Prize	Runners	Pos	Opponents
April 1754	Unnamed race	not known	Newmarket	40 gs	walkover	1	Mr Cornwall's Grey Colt
8 May 1754	Jockey Club Plate	3m 5f	Newmarket	100 gs and up	5	1	Pythos; Brilliant; Ginger; Bear
October 1754	Match race	4m 1.5f	Newmarket	300 gs	2	1	Ginger
April 1755	Unnamed race	not known	Newmarket	not known	3	3	Brilliant; Syphon
April 1756	Match race	not known	Newmarket	1,000 gs	2	2	Snap
May 1756	Match race	not known	Newmarket	1,000 gs	2	2	Snap
October 1756	Match race	not known	Newmarket	not known	2	forfeited	Spectator

== Breeding career ==
Marske stood at the Duke's Cumberland stud until his owner died in 1765. Being a rather average horse up to that point, he was then sold at Tattersall's to a Dorset farmer for a 'trifling sum'. At the farm, he covered mares for half a guinea. The farmer then sold him for only 20 guineas to William Wildman. He covered mares at Bisterne, Hampshire, for 3gs and 5s in 1767, 5gs and 5s in 1769 and 10gs and 5s in 1770 before his fee was raised to 30gs and 5s. However it wasn't until his greatest son, Eclipse, showed talent on the track that Marske became extremely popular. He was then sold for a large profit of 1,000 guineas to Willoughby Bertie, 4th Earl of Abingdon, who raised his stud fee to 100 guineas (equivalent to £15,300 in 2025). During his 22 years at the Earl's stud in Rycote, Oxfordshire, Marske sired across the next generation 154 winners. Top offspring include:

- Eclipse: 1764 chestnut colt, undefeated on the turf, winning all 18 of his races. He was even more influential as a sire, and today it is estimated that up to 95% of Thoroughbreds are descended from this horse.
- Young Marske: 1771 bay colt, broke down in his first race, but at stud he produced many good broodmares as well as Ruler (1777 colt, winner of the St. Leger), Fortitude (1778), Patriot (1787), Shuttle (1793), Abba Thulle (1786), Spanker (1787), Columbine (1783), and Prince Lee Boo (1784).
- Hephestion: 1771 colt, won the Jockey Club Plate & Craven Stakes
- Narcissus: 1771 colt
- Leviathan ("Mungo"): 1771 colt, good sire
- Shark: 1771 brown colt, top racehorse winning more than any other horse of his time, with a record of 19 wins in 29 starts, earnings of 16,057 guineas. Wins included a 1774 match for 500 guineas, a 1775 subscription sweep, the Clermont Cup, a 1,000 guineas match against Johnny. At stud he produced very little, and was exported to Virginia where he left several good broodmares. His top offspring of note in England was Violet (1787) dam to Goldenlocks (by Delpini) and Thomasina (by Timothy).
- Pontac: sired Derby winner Sir Thomas
- Masquerade 1771 filly, a very good race mare
- Desdemona 1770 filly, dam to Apothecary; third dam to Neva (1814, won Oaks and 1,000 Guineas), Magnolia (1771), and Proserpine (1766)

From these 22 years were sired 154 winners, of some £71,205 10s (equivalent to £10,100,000 in 2025) excluding non-monetary prizes and races won by unknown offspring, comparable to the wealth of an average feudal successor peer. The peak years of his produce were 1775, when wins occurred in 24 races (for winners he had sired) who earned £18,500 15s in prize money, and the next year saw 23 such wins and £19,235 13s to the various foals' owners.

He died in July 1779 and was commemorated with the following poem:

Ye sportsmen, for a while refrain your mirth;
Old Marsk is dead! consigned to peaceful earth;
The king of horses now, alas! is gone,
Sire of Eclipse, who ne'er was beat by one.....

— Anon

== Sire line tree ==
- Marske
  - Transit
  - Hephestion
  - Mungo (Leviathan)
  - Narcissus
  - Pretender
    - Longitude
    - Pretender
    - No Pretender
    - Pandolpho
      - Mowbray
        - Mercutio
  - Shark
  - Young Marske
    - Ruler
      - Weathercock
      - Pencil
      - Governor
    - Prince Lee Boo
    - Abba Thule
      - Clifton
    - Spanker
    - Shuttle
      - Stavely
      - Middlethorpe
      - Pope
        - Schahriar
  - Garrick (Hyperion)
    - Roscius
    - Sulky
  - Pontac
    - Sir Thomas
  - Jocundo
  - Eclipse
    - Planet
    - Potoooooooo
      - Coriander
      - Alderman
      - Asparagus
        - Teddy the Grinder
      - Waxy
        - Shock
        - Pavilion
        - Sir Walter Raleigh
        - Sasenagh
        - Ipswich
        - Waxy Pope
        - Crispin
        - Whalebone
        - Woful
        - Blucher
        - Quinola
        - Whisker
        - Milton
        - Inferior
        - Anti-Gallican
      - Champion
      - Tyrant
      - Vespasian
      - Worthy
        - Podargus
        - Musician
    - Jupiter
      - Ganymede
      - Thunderbolt
      - Jupiter
      - Sir Walter
    - Satellite
    - King Fergus
      - Honest Tom
      - Overton
        - Cockboat
        - Cockfighter
        - John O'Groat
        - Rolla
        - Alonzo
      - Poor Jack
      - Young Traveller
      - Ormond
      - Beningbrough
        - Ashton
        - Blue Devil
        - Harefoot
        - Orville
        - Delville
        - Rygantino
        - Thorn
        - Bedalian
        - Hylas
        - Phlebotomist
        - Scud
        - Windle
        - Trophonius
        - Prince of Orange
      - Brother to Overton
      - Deserter
      - Hambletonian
        - Camillus
        - Whitelock
        - Camerton
        - Anticipation
      - Garswood
      - Johnny
        - Master Jackey
      - Warter
    - Vertumnus
      - Baronet
        - Baronet
    - Boudrow
    - Obscurity
      - Bacchus
      - Bompard
    - Joe Andrews
      - Dick Andrews
        - Cwrw
        - Tramp
        - Biddick
        - Sir Richard
        - Merrymaker
    - Mercury
      - Precipitate
        - Petworth
        - Bobtail
        - Tag
        - Hackney
        - Langton
        - Sir Reginald
      - Silver
      - Gohanna
        - Cardinal Beaufort
        - Cerberus
        - Golumpus
        - Canopus
        - Hedley
        - Trafalgar
        - Brighton
        - Coriolanus
        - Election
        - Cestrian
        - Scorpion
        - Interloper
        - The Dandy
        - Punic
        - Robin Adair
        - Young Gohanna
        - Wanderer
        - Belleropheron
        - Skim
      - Hermes
    - Young Eclipse
      - Young Eclipse
    - Dungannon
      - Lurcher
        - Chance
      - Hambleton
      - Bedford
        - Gallatin
      - Young Dungannon
      - Boaster
    - Saltram
      - Whiskey
        - Whirligig
        - Orlando
        - Young Whiskey
        - Trafalgar
        - Pioneer
        - Juniper
        - Patriot
        - Marmion
      - Royalist
      - Whip
        - Hickory
        - Whip
      - Oscar
    - Volunteer
      - Stirling
      - Spread Eagle
        - American Eagle
        - Paragon
      - Volunteer
      - Magic
      - Eagle
        - Diomed Eagle
      - Fop
    - Serjeant
    - Alexander
      - Tityrus
      - Hephastion
    - Meteor
    - Don Quixote
      - Sancho
        - Cato
        - Banquo
        - Cannon Ball
        - Prime Minister
      - Cervantes
      - Whitenose
      - Amadis
        - Palmerin
    - Pegasus
      - Expedition
        - Sea Gull
      - Peace-Maker
      - Alonzo
      - Hippomenes
    - Brush

== Pedigree ==
Pedigree of Marske, brown horse, 1750
Sire Squirt (GB) 1732	Bartlett's Childers (GB); 1716	Darley Arabian	(unknown)
Sire Squirt (GB) 1732	Bartlett's Childers (GB); 1716	Darley Arabian	(unknown)
Sire Squirt (GB) 1732	Bartlett's Childers (GB); 1716	Betty Leades	Old Careless
Sire Squirt (GB) 1732	Bartlett's Childers (GB); 1716	Betty Leades	Cream Cheeks
Sire Squirt (GB) 1732	Sister to Old Country Wench (GB); 1715c	Snake (GB)	Lister Turk*
Sire Squirt (GB) 1732	Sister to Old Country Wench (GB); 1715c	Snake (GB)	Hautboy Mare^*
Sire Squirt (GB) 1732	Sister to Old Country Wench (GB); 1715c	Grey Wilkes (GB)	Hautboy*
Sire Squirt (GB) 1732	Sister to Old Country Wench (GB); 1715c	Grey Wilkes (GB)	Miss Darcy's Pet Mare
Dam The Ruby Mare (GB) 1738c	Hutton's Blacklegs (GB); 1725	Hutton's Bay Turk	(unknown)
Dam The Ruby Mare (GB) 1738c	Hutton's Blacklegs (GB); 1725	Hutton's Bay Turk	(unknown)
Dam The Ruby Mare (GB) 1738c	Hutton's Blacklegs (GB); 1725	Coneyskins Mare (GB)	Hutton's Coneyskins^*
Dam The Ruby Mare (GB) 1738c	Hutton's Blacklegs (GB); 1725	Coneyskins Mare (GB)	Clubfoot^*
Dam The Ruby Mare (GB) 1738c	Fox Cub Mare (GB); 1730	Fox Cub (GB)	Clumsey^*
Dam The Ruby Mare (GB) 1738c	Fox Cub Mare (GB); 1730	Fox Cub (GB)	Hampton Court Charming Jenny
Dam The Ruby Mare (GB) 1738c	Fox Cub Mare (GB); 1730	Hutton's Coneyskins Mare (GB)	Hutton's Coneyskins^*
Dam The Ruby Mare (GB) 1738c	Fox Cub Mare (GB); 1730	Hutton's Coneyskins Mare (GB)	Sister to Surley

*^ Marske is inbred 4S × 5S x 5D x 5D to the stallion Hautboy, meaning that he appears fourth generation once and fifth generation once (via Hautboy Mare)^ on the sire side of his pedigree and fifth generation twice (via Clubfoot and Clumsey)^ on the dam side of his pedigree.

*^ Marske is inbred 4S × 5D x 5D to the stallion Lister Turk, meaning that he appears fourth generation once on the sire side of his pedigree and fifth generation twice (via Hutton's Coneyskins)^ on the dam side of his pedigree.

* Marske is inbred 4D × 4D to the stallion Hutton's Coneyskins, meaning that he appears twice fourth generation on the dam side of his pedigree.

== Bibliography ==
- Ahnert, Rainer L., ed. (1970). Thoroughbred Breeding of the World. Germany: Pozdun Publishing.
- Whyte, James Christie (1840). History of the British Turf, from the earliest period to the present day, Volume I. London: H. Colburn. OL 6544990M.
