= Basto (horse) =

British Thoroughbred racehorse

Basto (1703 – c. 1723) was a British Thoroughbred racehorse, who was one of the most celebrated racehorses of the early 18th century. He was described as "remarkably strong... one of the most beautiful horses of his colour that ever appeared in this kingdom".

== History ==
Basto was a brown horse, sired by the Byerley Turk, out of Bay Peg, a daughter of the Leedes Arabian. His breeder, Sir William Ramsden, sold the horse to the Duke of Devonshire while he was still young.

In his racing career at the home of British racing in Newmarket, he won at least five match races (possibly more, since he raced before records were reliably kept) against some of the leading horses of the time.

At the Duke of Devonshire's stud, he sired several important racemares and broodmares including the dams of Old Crab, Blacklegs and Snip. Other offspring included Brown Betty, Coquette and Soreheels.

== Race record ==
| Date | Race name | Dist (miles) | Course | Prize | Odds | Runners | Place | Runner-up |
|---|---|---|---|---|---|---|---|---|
| October 1708 | Match race | 4 | Newmarket | not known | not known | 2 | 1 | Lord Treasurer's Squirrel |
| November 1708 | Match race | 5 | Newmarket | not known | not known | 2 | 1 | Lord Treasurer's Billy |
| March 1709 | Match race | 4 | Newmarket | not known | not known | 2 | 1 | Lord Raylton's Chance |
| October 1709 | Match race | 5 | Newmarket | not known | not known | 2 | 1 | Mr Pulleine's Tantivy |
| 1710 | Match race | 4 | Newmarket | not known | not known | 2 | 1 | Marquis of Dorchester's Brisk |

== Sire line tree ==
- Basto
  - Soreheels
    - Grey Soreheels
  - Little Scar

== Pedigree ==
Pedigree of Basto, brown stallion, 1703
| Sire Byerley Turk c.1680 | (unknown) | (unknown) | (unknown) |
| Sire Byerley Turk c.1680 | (unknown) | (unknown) | (unknown) |
| Sire Byerley Turk c.1680 | (unknown) | (unknown) | (unknown) |
| Sire Byerley Turk c.1680 | (unknown) | (unknown) | (unknown) |
| Sire Byerley Turk c.1680 | (unknown) | (unknown) | (unknown) |
| Sire Byerley Turk c.1680 | (unknown) | (unknown) | (unknown) |
| Sire Byerley Turk c.1680 | (unknown) | (unknown) | (unknown) |
| Sire Byerley Turk c.1680 | (unknown) | (unknown) | (unknown) |
| Dam Bay Peg c.1690 | Leedes Arabian bl. c.1670 | (unknown) | (unknown) |
| Dam Bay Peg c.1690 | Leedes Arabian bl. c.1670 | (unknown) | (unknown) |
| Dam Bay Peg c.1690 | Leedes Arabian bl. c.1670 | (unknown) | (unknown) |
| Dam Bay Peg c.1690 | Leedes Arabian bl. c.1670 | (unknown) | (unknown) |
| Dam Bay Peg c.1690 | Young Bald Peg c.1673 | Spanker | (unknown) |
| Dam Bay Peg c.1690 | Young Bald Peg c.1673 | Spanker | (unknown) |
| Dam Bay Peg c.1690 | Young Bald Peg c.1673 | Old Morocco Mare gr. c.1655 | Fairfax Morocco Barb gr. c.1633 |
| Dam Bay Peg c.1690 | Young Bald Peg c.1673 | Old Morocco Mare gr. c.1655 | Old Bald Peg c.1650 |

== Bibliography ==
- Whyte, James Christie (1840). History of the British Turf, from the earliest period to the present day, Volume I. London: H. Colburn. OL 6544990M.
