= Samuel Gist =

English-American slave owner

Samuel Gist (1717 or 1723, – February 1815) was an English-American slave owner. An Englishman, he rose from humble beginnings to become a wealthy slave owner and plantation owner in the Colony of Virginia. Upon the outbreak of the American Revolutionary War, he returned to Great Britain. In 1808, he drafted a will which stipulated the manumission of all of his slaves. He later amended it so that his executors could revoke that provision. However, the executors freed many, possibly all, of the slaves, probably numbering around 500, though some estimates go as high as 1,000.

== Life ==
Gist was orphaned at an early age, and grew up at Queen Elizabeth's Hospital in Bristol, Great Britain. In 1739, he was apprenticed to Alderman Lyonel Lyde as a scrivener and sent to his agent, the Virginia tobacco farmer John Smith. When Smith died in 1747, Gist married his widow, Sarah (or Mary) née Massie, and became very rich as a result, with large holdings of land and slaves. Gist obtained properties via the Smith and Massie families, including a shop in Hanover Town, the estate of Gold/Gould's Hill and many others. Some of these acquisitions of wealth became the subject of a court case, Rootes v. Gist. Gist, living in London, obtained the legal opinion of Charles Yorke concerning his rights in the matter. Patrick Henry, in a letter dated February 1770 (believed to be the earliest known letter of his), laid out his reasons for disagreeing with Yorke's conclusion.

Among other things, Gist engaged in land speculation, being one of the twelve founding members of the Dismal Swamp Company. He supplied the company with tools, materials and slaves, so he became the only member to make money from the scheme, which was intended to create a navigation canal and drain the land for farming.

Gist wrote to George Washington from London on June 17, 1769. He became a burgess of Bristol in 1752, indicating his intention to return to England, but it seems family and business commitments delayed his return. In 1782, the Virginia Assembly vested his property, including 82 slaves, in his stepdaughter, Mary Anderson, because he was a non-resident British subject. Later, he regained ownership through legal action, though he apparently never returned to the United States, living in London in the last years of his life, still engaged in business.

== Will and freeing of his slaves ==
Gist drafted a will dated June 22, 1808, that freed his slaves and provided funds for them to be cared for and educated according to Anglican practices. Part of the funding was to come from tobacco crops harvested by the slaves. He supposedly owned 274, though a later codicil noted that that number had increased substantially. He later amended the will so that his executors were not required to free the slaves. Nonetheless, it appears that they did indeed free many, possibly all, of the slaves, probably numbering around 500, though some estimates go as high as 1,000.

Gist's will became a huge problem as, though he had continued contact with his estate manager, he had not consulted his legal advisor in Virginia. In his absence, the United States had gained its independence and established its own legal system. Worse, he died after the War of 1812, so there was considerable hostility towards the British at the time, so there was little interest in or commitment to enacting his will. He had assumed his attorney John Wickham would carry out his wishes, but like Gist he was old by that time and passed the responsibility on to his son John Fanning Wickham, who spent decades trying to sort out the many problems. He appointed Quakers to act as agents to supervise the removals and help the freemen resettle. The last of the agents died in 1885. A major problem was that the Virginian Assembly had passed a law preventing freed slaves remaining in the state for more than a year, so they had to be relocated to the nearest free state, Ohio. This was hugely expensive, and as part of the funding was to come from the tobacco harvest, the funds were reduced as their demands increased. The first of the removals was in 1819, the last in 1829. In the meantime, some of the former slaves ran away, some refused to move, some were too old to survive the long journey, and many children were born, so the actual numbers cited vary widely.
