= D'Arcy Yellow Turk =

Foundation sire of the Thoroughbred breed

- Sex: Stallion
- Foaled: c. 1670
- Colour: Palomino or Sorrel
- Owner: James D'Arcy

D'Arcy Yellow Turk (c. 1670 - ) or Darcy's Yellow Turk was a foundation sire of the Thoroughbred breed. His influence is evident throughout the breed due to his lineage being traced to all three officially recognized foundation sires, Matchem, Herod, and Eclipse. Each descends at least four lines back to this sire, with Eclipse descending six.

== "Yellow" Turk ==
His color has been disputed as his color was not listed in the General Stud Book. However, he was identified as one of D'Arcy's Chestnut Arabians, yet he was also called the "Yellow Turk". Since the term "gold" was familiar during this time period, the use of "yellow" in his name allows speculation regarding what his color actually was. A number of horses during this time period were described in the inventory of the Tutbury Stud as "sorrill" and the color "chestnut" appears to not exist as a naming option. It appears reasonable to presume that "yellow" may have been used to indicate palomino given the other color options available at the time. However, it is possible he was Sorrel despite this evidence.

== Origins ==
D'Arcy Yellow Turk was believed to be owned/managed by James D'Arcy, stud master to King Charles II of England. A horse by the name of Dodsworth, possibly owned by either the king or the Dodsworth family, was involved with D'Arcy, though none of the horse imports are credited to the king nor the Dodsworth family, but rather to D'Arcy. It has been speculated by research done for the racehorse Highflyer that the D'Arcy Yellow Turk is the same horse as Dodsworth.

== Influence as a sire ==
Spanker

His best son was Spanker, who was covering mares around 1689, and sired notable sons Old Careless, St Martin, and Young Spanker. Also, there are at least nine daughters of Spanker that appear in the General Stud Book. One daughter of Spanker became the dam of Jigg (by the Byerley Turk), sire of Partner, who was in turn the grandsire of Herod and damsire of Matchem.

Brimmer

Another important son was Brimmer, who sired a notable son named Burford Bull, as well as 11 daughters that appear with progeny in the General Stud Book. This includes the foundation mare for Family #70 who was the third dam of Squirrel, and the fourth dam of Matchem, and the fifth dam of Eclipse.

Oglethorpe Arabian

The Oglethorpe Arabian, another son, was the sire of the influential sire Makeless, sire of Brown Farewell (granddam of Matchem), the dam of Bay Bolton, the dam of Hartley's Blind Horse, and the Scarborough mare.

Bay Dodsworth

Bay Dodsworth (out of Dodsworth; probably D'Arcy Yellow Turk) was the sire of the 5th dam of Hutton's Surley, whose sister was in turn the 5th dam of Marske, the sire of Eclipse. Bay Dodsworth would therefore be the sire of mare Family #8. Also, it is possible that his daughter was the mare as Dickey Pierson Mare of Family #2.

== Sire line tree ==
- D'Arcy Yellow Turk
  - Spanker
    - Old Careless
    - St Martin
      - Governor
    - Young Spanker
  - Oglethorpe Arabian
    - Makeless
      - Old Scar
        - Long John
    - Bald Frampton
  - Oglethorpe's Son of the Yellow Turk
  - Brimmer
    - Brimmer Colt
      - Ruffler
        - Victorious
          - Highlander
    - Burford Bull
- Dodsworth
  - Bay Dodsworth
  - Dickey Pierson

== See also ==
- List of historical horses
