= Bay Bolton =

British-bred Thoroughbred racehorse

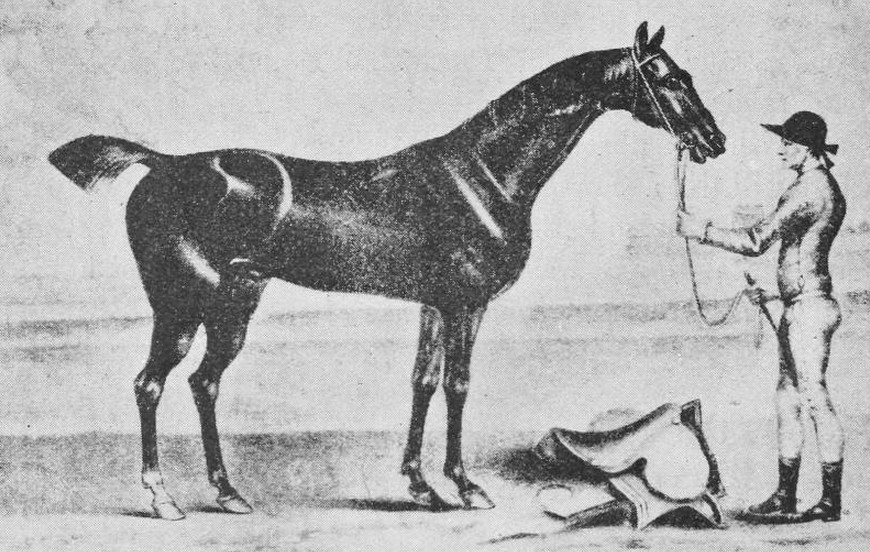
- Print of Bay Bolton
- Sire: Grey Hautboy
- Grandsire: Hautboy
- Dam: Makeless mare
- Damsire: Makeless
- Sex: Stallion
- Foaled: 1705
- Country: Great Britain
- Colour: Brown/Bay
- Breeder: Sir Matthew Pierson
- Owner: 2nd Duke of Bolton

Major wins
- Queen Anne's Gold Cup (1710)

Honours
- Leading sire in Great Britain and Ireland (1724, 1726, 1727, 1729, 1732, 1733, 1734)
- Last updated on 30 October 2012

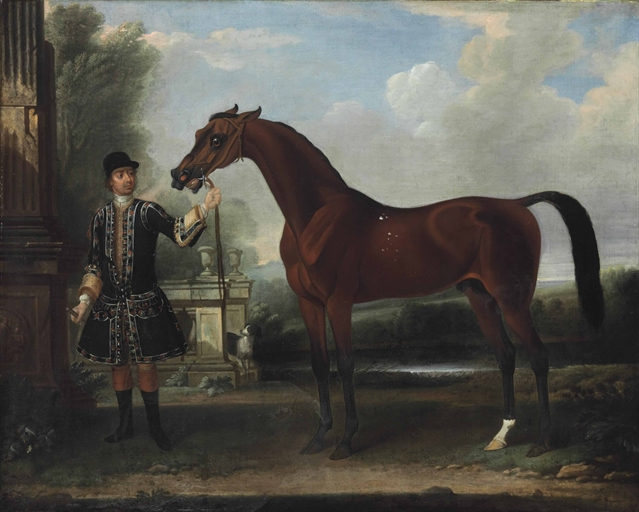
Bay Bolton, foaled 1705, held by a groom, in a parkland setting, oil on canvas, by Thomas Spencer (1700-1763), 40¼ x 50¼ inches.

Bay Bolton or Brown Lusty (1705–1736) was a British Thoroughbred racehorse who won Queen Anne's Gold Cup as a five-year-old in 1710. After retiring from racing he became a successful sire for the Charles Paulet, 2nd Duke of Bolton, and his son Charles Powlett, 3rd Duke of Bolton, was Champion sire seven times.

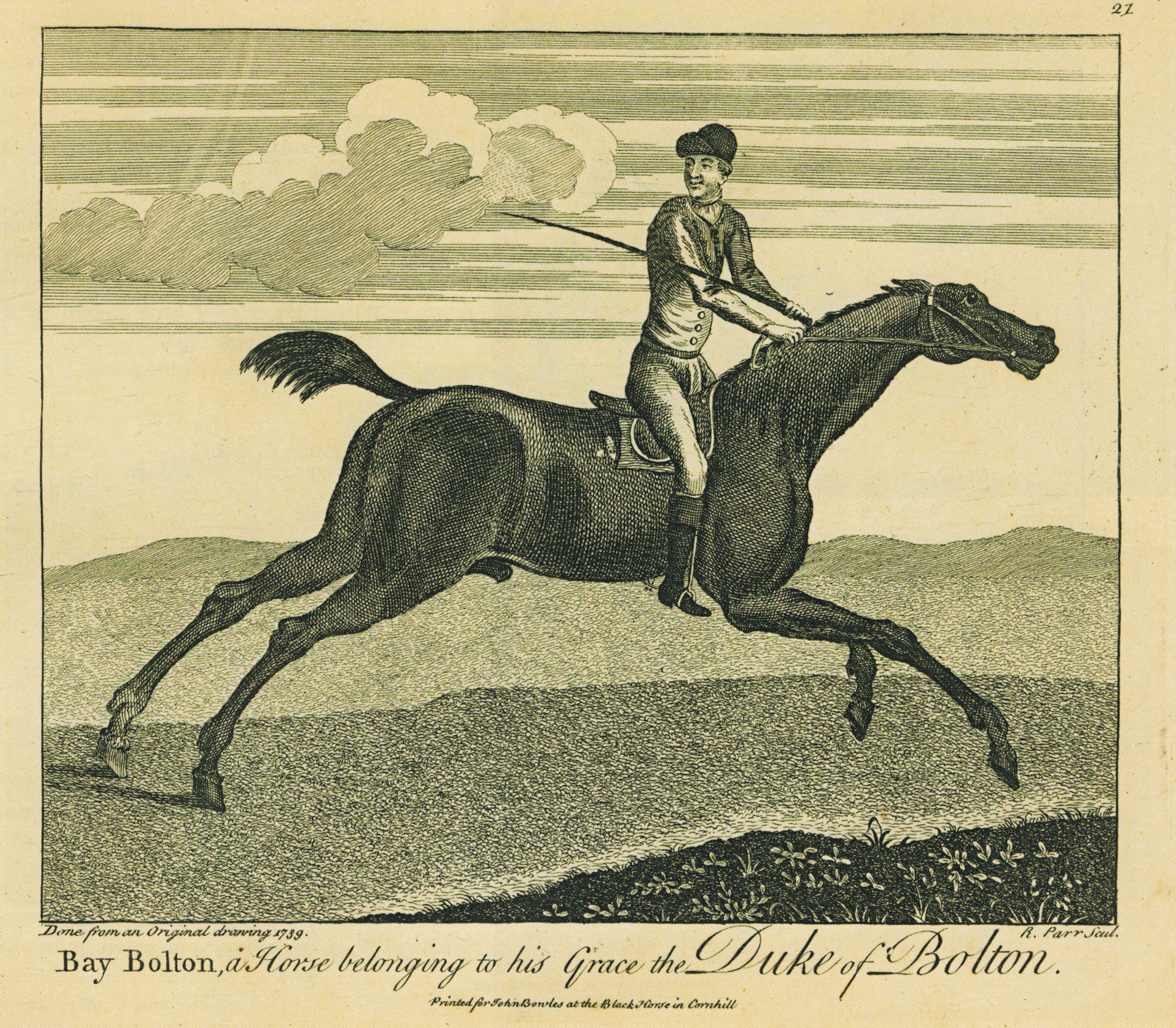
Bay Bolton, a horse belonging to his grace the Duke of Bolton, engraved by Richard Parr, 1739.

== Background ==
Bay Bolton (originally called Brown Lusty) was a brown or bay colt foaled in 1705. Bred by Sir Matthew Pierson, he was a son of Grey Hautboy and a Makeless mare.

== Racing career ==
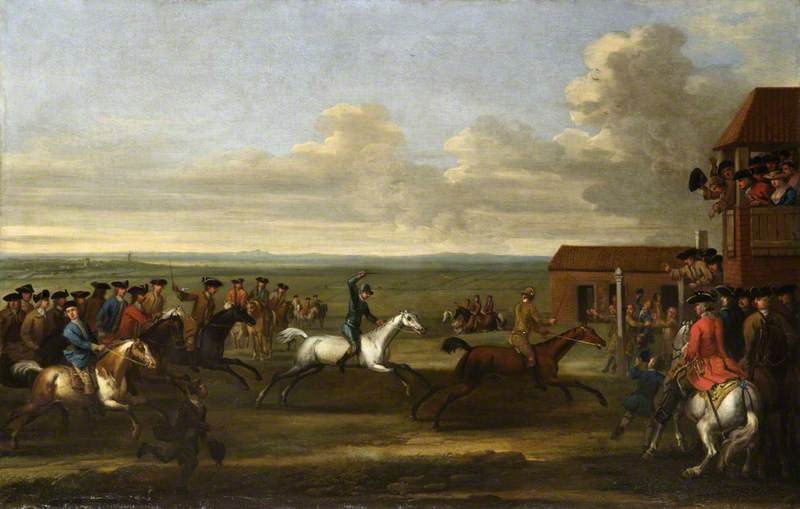
Horse Race at Newmarket (The Duke of Bolton's Bay Bolton defeating the Duke of Somerset's Grey Windham (Old Wyndham) at Newmarket on either 12 November 1712 or 4 April 1713), by John Wootton, 30 x 46 inches.

At York in 1710, Bay Bolton (then a five-year-old) beat eight six-year-olds to win Queen Anne's Gold Cup. In 1710 he also won the Subscription Purse at Middleham-Moor. He then walked 200 miles to run in, and win, the Rich Prize at Quainton-Meadow in Buckinghamshire. Bay Bolton was then bought by the Duke of Bolton, who sent him to Newmarket, where he won a match race against the Duke of Somerset's Wyndham and a match against Sir Matthew Pierson's Merlin. He also won two match races against Mr Frampton's Dragon.

== Stud career ==
Bay Bolton was retired to stud where he became a very successful stallion, becoming Champion sire in 1724, 1726, 1727, 1729, 1732, 1733 and 1734. His progeny included Bonny Lass, Fearnought, Looby, Starling (a Champion sire) and Whitefoot. He died at the Duke of Bolton's stud at Bolton Hall in Yorkshire in 1736.

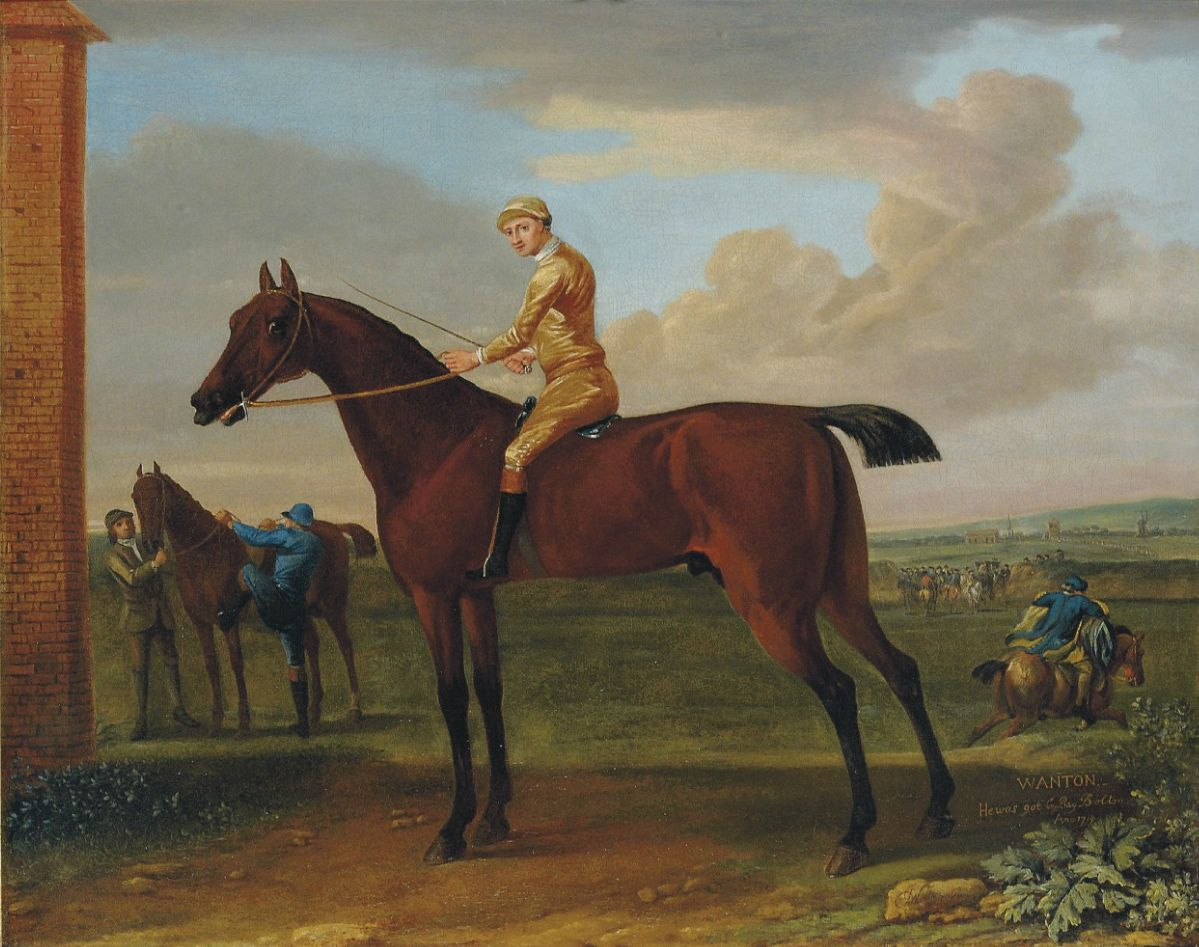
Bay Wanton, on Newmarket Heath with jockey up, 1725, by John Wootton, possibly a son of Bay Bolton and inscribed (but possibly not) 'The property of Charles Paulett, 3rd Duke of Bolton'.

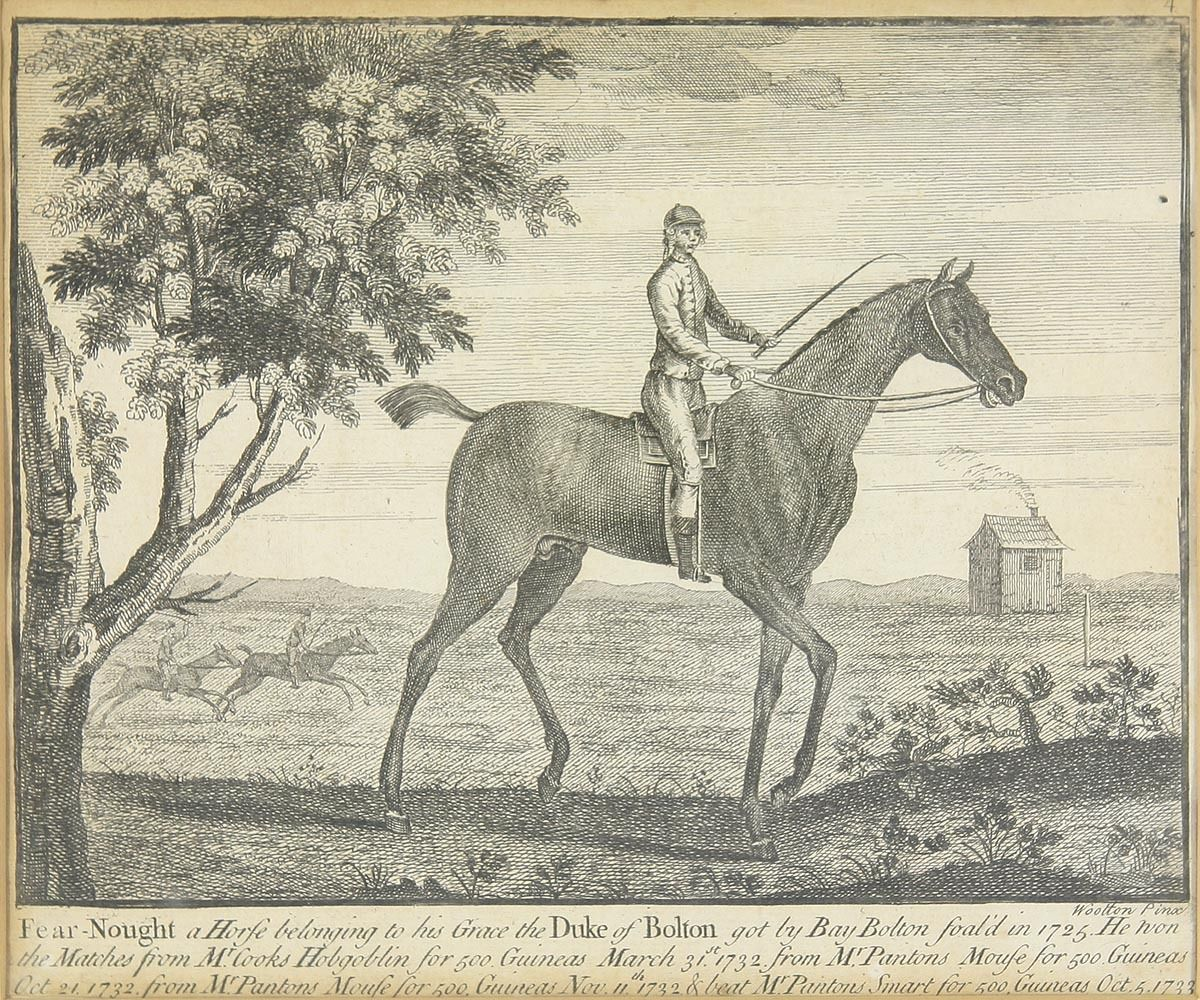
Fearnought, Fear-Nought, a horse belonging to the Duke of Bolton, got by Bay Bolton, foaled 1725, print after John Wootton.

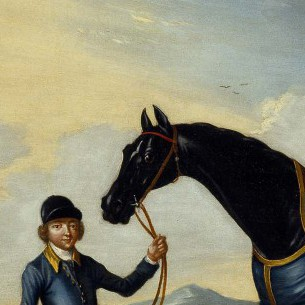
Detail of the Duke of Bolton's Syphax, black colt, foaled 1727, by Bay Bolton out of Golden Locks got by Mostyn’s Grasshopper her dam by Lord Bristol’s Hog, 25 x 30 inches, by Richard Roper, 1734.

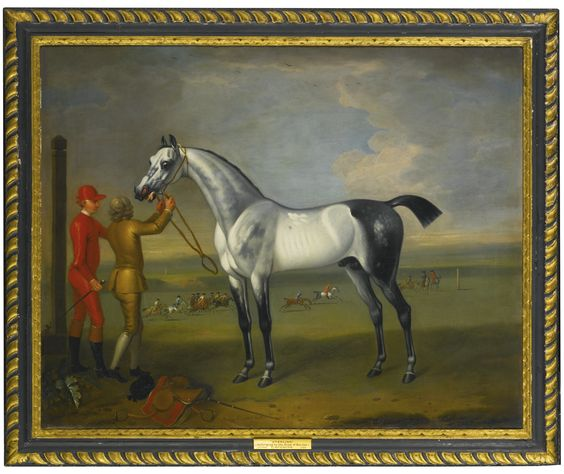
Starling, the Duke of Bolton's grey colt, foaled 1727, by Thomas Spencer (1700-1763).

== Sire line tree ==
- Bay Bolton
  - Sloven
  - Whitefoot
    - Molotto
    - Tortoise
    - Beau
  - Camillus
  - Bay Bolton Colt
  - Spark
  - Fearnought
  - Fearnought (Brother)
  - Starling
    - Starling (Ancaster)
    - Teazer
    - Teazer (Grisewood)
    - Torismond
    - Skim
      - Skim
    - Young Starling
    - Moro
      - Young Moro
    - Starling
    - Perseus
      - Bay Richmond
        - Clockfast
    - Verjuice
  - Syphax
  - Looby
    - Tryal
  - Patriot

== Pedigree ==
Pedigree of Bay Bolton, brown or bay stallion, 1705
Sire Grey Hautboy (GB)	Hautboy	Places White Turk*	Helmsley Turk*
Sire Grey Hautboy (GB)	Hautboy	Places White Turk*	(unknown)
Sire Grey Hautboy (GB)	Hautboy	Royal mare	(unknown)
Sire Grey Hautboy (GB)	Hautboy	Royal mare	(unknown)
Sire Grey Hautboy (GB)	Natural Barb mare	Natural Barb	(unknown)
Sire Grey Hautboy (GB)	Natural Barb mare	Natural Barb	(unknown)
Sire Grey Hautboy (GB)	Natural Barb mare	(unknown)	(unknown)
Sire Grey Hautboy (GB)	Natural Barb mare	(unknown)	(unknown)
Dam Makeless mare (GB)	Makeless	Oglethorpe Arabian	D'Arcy Yellow Turk*
Dam Makeless mare (GB)	Makeless	Oglethorpe Arabian	(unknown)
Dam Makeless mare (GB)	Makeless	D'Arcy Yellow Turk mare*	D'Arcy Yellow Turk*
Dam Makeless mare (GB)	Makeless	D'Arcy Yellow Turk mare*	Natural Turk
Dam Makeless mare (GB)	Grey Royal	Places White Turk*	Helmsley Turk*
Dam Makeless mare (GB)	Grey Royal	Places White Turk*	(unknown)
Dam Makeless mare (GB)	Grey Royal	D'Arcy Yellow Turk mare*	D'Arcy Yellow Turk*
Dam Makeless mare (GB)	Grey Royal	D'Arcy Yellow Turk mare*	Sedbury Royal mare

* Bay Bolton is inbred 3S × 3D to the stallion Places White Turk, meaning that he appears third generation on the sire side of his pedigree and third generation on the dam side of his pedigree.

* Bay Bolton is inbred 3D × 3D to the mare D'Arcy Yellow Turk mare, meaning that she appears twice in third generation on the dam side of his pedigree.

* Bay Bolton is inbred 4D × 4D x 4D to the stallion D'Arcy Yellow Turk, meaning that he appears thrice fourth generation on the dam side of his pedigree.
