= Spanker (horse) =

British-bred Thoroughbred racehorse

Spanker (foaled 1678), sometimes called Old Spanker or the Pelham Arabian, was a British Thoroughbred racehorse who sired many important horses in the history of the breed. He was said to be the best horse in Newmarket, the home of British racing, during the reign of Charles II.

== History ==
Spanker was a bay horse. His sire and dam were D'Arcy Yellow Turk and the Old Morocco Mare (by Fairfax Morocco Barb). He was bred at Brocklesby, Lincolnshire by Charles Pelham, although some accounts have him bred by George Villiers, 2nd Duke of Buckingham and only later passing into Pelham's hands.

He went on to sire some important horses in the breed including Careless, St. Martin, and Young Spanker, who went on to sire the dam of Basto.

== Sire line tree ==
- Spanker
  - Old Careless
  - St Martin
    - Governor
  - Young Spanker

== See also ==
- List of historical horses
