= 1781 Epsom Derby =

- Derby
- Location: Epsom Downs
- Date: 24 May 1781
- Winning horse: Young Eclipse
- Starting price: 10/1
- Jockey: Charles Hindley
- Trainer: not known
- Owner: Dennis O'Kelly
- Conditions: not known

The 1781 Epsom Derby was the second running of The Derby - the horse race known as the "greatest turf event in the world". It took place on 24 May 1781 on Epsom Downs in Surrey, England, and was won by Young Eclipse, owned by gambler Dennis O'Kelly and ridden by Charles Hindley.

The previous year, Lord Derby had instigated a race at Epsom Racecourse for three-year-old horses, the name of which had been decided on a coin toss between Derby and Sir Charles Bunbury, a member of the Jockey Club (although it may have been that Bunbury deferred to Derby, who was his host at the time). The race was over 1 mile (although in 1784 that would be increased to 1 mile 4 furlongs, the distance it has been ever since).

The 1780 race had been won by Bunbury's horse Diomed, which was the favourite, beating Boudrow, owned by Dennis O'Kelly. In this second running of the race, it was O'Kelly who had the winner, Young Eclipse, another colt by the pre-eminent sire of the day, Eclipse. He beat Sir John Lade's Crop who was much the more fancied of the runners, going off 5/4 favourite.

== Race details ==
- Winner's prize money: £1,312 10s
- Going: not known
- Number of runners: 14 or 15
- Winner's time: not known

== Full result ==
	Horse (Note: Sources disagree about exact line-up and finishing positions)	Jockey	Trainer	Owner	SP
1	Young Eclipse	Charles Hindley	not known	Dennis O'Kelly	10/1
2	Crop	not known	not known	Sir John Lade	5/4 fav
3	Prince of Orange	not known	not known	Lord Clermont	not known
also	Arbutus	not known	not known	Lord Clermont	not known
also	Seducer	not known	not known	Mr Walker	not known
also	Scarf	not known	not known	Lord Milsingtown (sic)	not known
also	Alphonso	not known	not known	Duke of Cumberland	not known
also	Dorilas	not known	not known	General Smith	not known
also	bay colt by Sweetwilliam	not known	not known	Duke of Queensberry	not known
also	bay filly by Herod	not known	not known	Mr Kingsman	not known
also	colt by Metaphysician	not known	not known	Mr Douglas	not known
also	Prospect	not known	not known	C Davers or Danver	not known
also	Shag	not known	not known	Lord Craven	not known
also	Cauliflower	not known	not known	Mr Sulsh	not known
also	King William (Note: Not listed in Turf Register only in other sources)	not known	not known	Lord Derby	not known

== Winner details ==
Further details of the winner, Young Eclipse:

- Foaled: 1778
- Sire: Eclipse
- Dam: Juno by Spectator
- Owner: Dennis O'Kelly
- Breeder: Dennis O'Kelly

== Bibliography ==
- Mortimer, Roger; Onslow, Richard; Willett, Peter (1978). Biographical Encyclopaedia of British Racing. London: Macdonald and Jane's. ISBN 0-354-08536-0.
- Pick, Willam; Johnson, R. (1822). "Winners &c". The Turf Register, and Sportsman & Breeder's Stud-book. 3.
