= Tartar (horse) =

British Thoroughbred racehorse

- Sire: Florizel
- Grandsire: Herod
- Dam: Ruth
- Damsire: Eclipse
- Sex: Stallion
- Foaled: 1789
- Country: Kingdom of Great Britain
- Colour: Chestnut
- Owner: Lord Archibald Hamilton; Leonard Jewison; Mr Thompson
- Record: 6: 3-1-1

Major wins
- St Leger Stakes (1792)

Tartar (later named Toy, foaled 1789) was a British Thoroughbred racehorse best known for winning the classic St Leger Stakes in 1792. One of the smallest horses to win a classic, he won the St Leger on his racecourse debut in September 1792. He won twice in the following season before racing without success in 1794.

== Background ==
Tartar was a chestnut horse standing 14.1 hands high, foaled in 1789. He was sired by Florizel a successful racehorse whose other offspring included The Derby winners Diomed and Eager as well as the St Leger winner Ninety-three. Tartar was the sixth of eight foals produced by the Duke of Cumberland's mare Ruth.

The name Tartar had previously been used for several other horses in the 18th century. The most notable was a Yorkshire-bred racehorse who sired Herod and was therefore the paternal great-grandsire of the St Leger winner who shared his name.

== Racing career ==
=== 1792: three-year-old season ===
Until 1913, there was no requirement for British racehorses to have official names, and the horse who later became known as Tartar competed in 1792 as Ld A. Hamilton's ch. c. by Florizel out of Ruth.

There is no record of Hamilton's colt competing in public until the autumn of 1792. The St Leger, run over two miles at Doncaster Racecourse on 25 September attracted a field of eight colts and three fillies. Mr Wentworth's colt Ormond ridden by Leonard Jewison (1739-1817) was 3rd. Sir Frank Standish's Kit Carr and an unnamed colt owned by John Hutchinson led the betting at odds of 3/1 with Hamilton's colt starting a 25/1 outsider. Ridden by his trainer, John Mangle, the nameless colt won the classic from the filly Skypeeper with Adonis in third place.

=== 1793: four-year-old season ===
Before the start of the 1793, season the St Leger winner was sold and entered the ownership of Mr Leonard Jewison. He was still without an official name when he made his first appearance as a four-year-old at Newcastle-under-Lyme Racecourse on 2 July. Jewison's chestnut colt by Florizel contested a £50 race run in a series of four-mile heats with the prize going to the first horse to win twice. He won the first heat from Ruby and Highland Lass, and took the win when both his opponents were withdrawn from the second heat. On the following day Jewison's colt finished third in the first heat of another £50 race, but won the next two heats to win the prize from Virgin and Young Eclipse. On 20 August, Jewison's colt appeared as Tartar for the first and only time in a race at York. This was a "give and take" race in which horses were given a weight based on their height. Tartar, whose height was given as 14 hands 1 inch, started the 6/4 favourite but was withdrawn after finishing second in the first heat. Tartar's last race recorded race of 1793 was at Boroughbridge Racecourse on 2 October. He finished second, fourth and fifth in three heats of a £50 race won by Alexina.

=== 1794: five-year-old season ===
On 13 June 1794 at Manchester Racecourse, Mr Thompson's five-year-old chestnut horse Toy finished second to Minimus in the first heat of an £80 race. According to the 1794 Racing Calendar, Toy was the horse formerly known as Tartar.

== Stud career ==
Tartar was sold to Count Vorontsov, then a minister at St. James Court, and was exported to Russia along with the 1794 Derby winner, Daedalus.

== Pedigree ==
Pedigree of Tartar (GB), chestnut colt, 1789
Sire Florizel (GB) 1768	Herod; 1758	Tartar	Partner
Sire Florizel (GB) 1768	Herod; 1758	Tartar	Meliora
Sire Florizel (GB) 1768	Herod; 1758	Cypron	Blaze
Sire Florizel (GB) 1768	Herod; 1758	Cypron	Salome
Sire Florizel (GB) 1768	Cygnet mare 1761	Cygnet	Godolphin Arabian*^
Sire Florizel (GB) 1768	Cygnet mare 1761	Cygnet	Godolphin Blossom
Sire Florizel (GB) 1768	Cygnet mare 1761	Young Cartouch mare	Young Cartouch
Sire Florizel (GB) 1768	Cygnet mare 1761	Young Cartouch mare	Ebony
Dam Ruth (GB) 1776	Eclipse; 1764	Marske	Squirt
Dam Ruth (GB) 1776	Eclipse; 1764	Marske	The Ruby Mare
Dam Ruth (GB) 1776	Eclipse; 1764	Spilletta	Regulus^
Dam Ruth (GB) 1776	Eclipse; 1764	Spilletta	Mother Western
Dam Ruth (GB) 1776	Blank mare	Blank	Godolphin Arabian*^
Dam Ruth (GB) 1776	Blank mare	Blank	Amorett
Dam Ruth (GB) 1776	Blank mare	Oroonoko mare	Oroonoko
Dam Ruth (GB) 1776	Blank mare	Oroonoko mare	Mixbury (Family:2)

*^ Tartar is inbred 4S x 5D x 4D to the stallion Godolphin Arabian, meaning that he appears fourth generation once on the sire side of his pedigree and fifth (via Regulus)^ and fourth generation once each on the dam side of his pedigree.
