= 1795 in sports =

1795 in sports describes the year's events in world sport.

== Boxing ==
Events

- 15 April — "Gentleman" John Jackson defeated Daniel Mendoza in nine rounds at Hornchurch to claim the Championship of England. Jackson did not defend the title and retired in 1796.

== Cricket ==
Events

- Lord Frederick Beauclerk ended his studies at the University of Cambridge to become a full-time cricketer for the next thirty seasons; although he was an outstanding player, he is one of the most controversial figures in the sport's history.

England

- Most runs – John Hammond 800
- Most wickets – Thomas Boxall 60

== Horse racing ==
England

- The Derby – Spread Eagle
- The Oaks – Platina
- St Leger Stakes – Hambletonian
