= 1793 in sports =

1793 in sports describes the year's events in world sport.

== Boxing ==
Events

- "Big Ben" Brain retained his English Championship title, but illness meant that he could not fight again.

== Cricket ==
Events

- Surrey teams defeated England three times.

England

- Most runs – Tom Walker 496 (HS 138)
- Most wickets – Thomas Boxall 44

== Horse racing ==
England

- The Derby – Waxy
- The Oaks – Caelia
- St Leger Stakes – Ninety-three
