= 1781 in sports =

1781 in sports describes the year's events in world sport.

== Archery ==
Events

- Foundation of the Toxophilite Society at Leicester Square, London; it later gained royal patronage and became the Royal Toxophilite Society in 1787.

== Boxing ==
Events

- Unknown.

== Cricket ==
Events

- The Hambledon Club abandoned its traditional home at Broadhalfpenny Down after the members decided it was "too remote" and relocated to Windmill Down just outside Hambledon village

England

- Most runs – James Aylward 319
- Most wickets – Lamborn 27

== Horse racing ==
England

- The Derby – Young Eclipse
- The Oaks – Faith
- St Leger Stakes – Serina
