= 1792 in sports =

1792 in sports describes the year's events in world sport.

== Boxing ==
Events

- "Big Ben" Brain retained his English Championship title but he became ill with cirrhosis of the liver and did not fight again. He died of the disease in April 1794.

== Cricket ==
Events

- During a minor match in Sheffield, the first known instance is recorded of a batsman being given out for obstructing the field. John Shaw, who had scored 7, has his dismissal recorded as "run out of the ground to hinder a catch".

England

- Most runs – Tom Walker 542 (HS 107)
- Most wickets – Thomas Boxall 46

== Horse racing ==
England

- The Derby – John Bull
- The Oaks – Volante
- St Leger Stakes – Tartar
