= Paris (horse) =

British-bred Thoroughbred racehorse

- Sire: Sir Peter Teazle
- Grandsire: Highflyer
- Dam: Horatia
- Damsire: Eclipse
- Sex: Stallion
- Foaled: 1803
- Country: United Kingdom of Great Britain and Ireland
- Colour: Brown
- Breeder: Sir Frank Standish
- Owner: Sir Frank Standish; Lord Foley
- Trainer: Richard Prince
- Record: 14:7-5-0

Major wins
- Epsom Derby (1806); Matches against Achilles, Wretch, Sir Launcelot

Paris (foaled 1803) was a British Thoroughbred racehorse. In a career that lasted from April 1806 to April 1808, he ran fourteen times and won seven races. In 1806 he won the Derby on his third racecourse appearance shortly after being sold by his breeder. Paris stayed in training for two more years and had some success in match races. His racing career was ended by an injury at Newmarket Racecourse in 1808, after which he was retired to stud where he proved a to be a complete failure.

== Background ==
Paris was a brown horse bred by his first owner Sir Frank Standish. Paris's sire, Sir Peter Teazle (or simply "Sir Peter") won the Epsom Derby in 1787 and became the most successful stallion of the time, winning the title of Champion sire on ten occasions between 1799 and 1809. Paris was the last foal of Horatia, a highly successful broodmare, who had previously produced the Derby winner Archduke and the double Doncaster Cup winner Stamford, both sired by Sir Peter.

== Racing career ==
=== 1806: three-year-old season ===
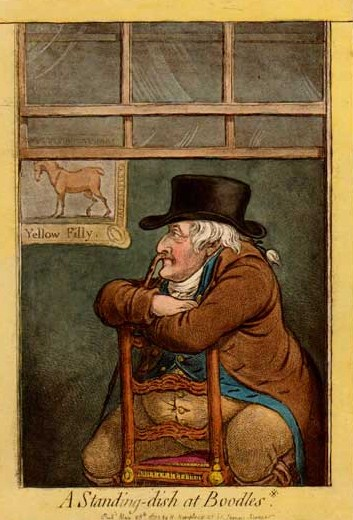
Sir Frank Standish bred Paris but sold him just before his Classic win. Caricature by James Gillray.

Until 1946 there was no requirement for British racehorses to be named, and in the early years of the nineteenth century it was common for horses to be known by their owner, colour, sex and pedigree rather than an official name. The colt who became Paris made his debut as "Sir F Standish's b c, brother to Stamford, by Sir Peter" at Newmarket on 7 April 1806. He started the 8/1 fourth choice in the betting for a six-runner Sweepstakes and won the prize by beating the favourite Podargus. Four days later at the same course "Sir F Standish's br c by Sir Peter out of Horatia" won another Sweepstakes, beating a single opponent at odds of 1/6.

Before his next appearance in the Derby the colt was bought for 2,000 guineas by Lord Foley who named his acquisition Paris. At Epsom on 22 May he started the 5/1 second favourite in a field of twelve runners. Paris's former owner, Frank Standish, had the favourite for the race, an unnamed chestnut filly by Mr Teazle who started at 7/2. The race attracted a large and fashionable crowd including the Prince of Wales with his friends Lord Darlington and Sir John Lade. The early pace was fast, with Lord Egremont's colt Trafalgar running strongly but John Shepherd on Paris keeping his horse under restraint until the turn into the straight. In the last quarter mile Trafalgar and Paris pulled clear and raced "neck and neck" throughout the final furlong until Shepherd made a "desperate push" in the last strides to win by a head. Two days after the Derby, and racing over the same course and distance, Paris incurred his first defeat in a Produce Sweepstakes. After "a fine race" he finished second of the three runners to an unnamed colt (later named Canopus) to whom he was conceding five pounds.

Paris returned after a four-month break for the autumn meetings at Newmarket. On 29 September he ran a 200 guinea match race against the previous year's Derby winner Cardinal Beaufort over the Abingdon Mile course. Paris was defeated by his older rival, from whom he was receiving eight pounds. Later the same afternoon he started 3/1 second favourite for a Sweepstakes "Across the Flat" (ten furlongs) and finished second to Mr Mellish's colt Smuggler. Two days later, Lord Foley was able to claim the prize money in a two-mile Subscription race when Paris was the only runner to appear and was allowed to walk over. Paris was scheduled to take part in a match race against Mr Payne's colt Tudor on 28 October, but failed to appear.

=== 1807: four-year-old season ===
Paris's spring schedule in 1807 consisted of three match races at Newmarket. On 31 March he conceded three pounds to Mr Shakespear's filly Wretch over ten furlongs. Paris started the 4/6 favourite and defeated the filly to claim a prize of 200 guineas. Two weeks later over the same course and distance he beat Mr Shakespear's colt Achilles at level weights to win a further 200 guineas. On 30 April he was matched against Sir John Shelley's five-year-old Sir Launcelot, from whom he received seven pounds. He won 500 guineas by defeating the older horse over two miles at odds of 4/6.

In late summer, Paris was sent on an unsuccessful journey to York. On 24 August he started 1/2 favourite for a Sweepstakes over four miles but finished last of the five runners behind Thorn. Two days later he ran in a three-mile Sweepstakes for four-year-olds against Thorn, Smuggler and the St Leger winner Fyldener, who was made 7/4 favourite. Paris started at odds of 6/1 and finished second to Smuggler.

On his return to Newmarket, Paris started favourite for a Subscription race on 29 September and finished second to the Duke of Grafton's filly Vanity.

=== 1808: five-year-old season ===
Paris stayed in training as a five-year-old, but his season was restricted to a single race. On 18 April at Newmarket, he broke down injured in a 500 guinea match against the Derby runner-up Trafalgar. He did not race again and was withdrawn from matches against Canopus in April and Smuggler in May.

== Stud career ==
Paris was never advertised as a stallion in the Racing Calendar, and appears to have made no impact whatsoever as a sire. According to the General Stud Book he sired only two known foals, fillies born in 1810 (out of Venom) and 1812 (out of Roxana).

== Pedigree ==
Pedigree of Paris (GB), brown stallion, 1803
Sire Sir Peter Teazle(GB) 1784	Highflyer; 1774	Herod	Tartar
Sire Sir Peter Teazle(GB) 1784	Highflyer; 1774	Herod	Cypron
Sire Sir Peter Teazle(GB) 1784	Highflyer; 1774	Rachel	Blank*
Sire Sir Peter Teazle(GB) 1784	Highflyer; 1774	Rachel	Regulus mare
Sire Sir Peter Teazle(GB) 1784	Papillon; 1769	Snap	Snip
Sire Sir Peter Teazle(GB) 1784	Papillon; 1769	Snap	sister to Slippy
Sire Sir Peter Teazle(GB) 1784	Papillon; 1769	Miss Cleveland	Regulus*^
Sire Sir Peter Teazle(GB) 1784	Papillon; 1769	Miss Cleveland	Midge
Dam Horatia (GB) 1778	Eclipse; 1764	Marske	Squirt
Dam Horatia (GB) 1778	Eclipse; 1764	Marske	The Ruby mare
Dam Horatia (GB) 1778	Eclipse; 1764	Spilletta	Regulus*^
Dam Horatia (GB) 1778	Eclipse; 1764	Spilletta	Mother Western
Dam Horatia (GB) 1778	Countess; 1760	Blank*^	Godolphin Arabian^
Dam Horatia (GB) 1778	Countess; 1760	Blank*^	Amorett
Dam Horatia (GB) 1778	Countess; 1760	Rib mare	Rib
Dam Horatia (GB) 1778	Countess; 1760	Rib mare	Wynn Arabian mre (Family:30)

* Paris is inbred 4S x 3D to the stallion Blank, meaning that he appears fourth generation on the sire side of his pedigree and third generation on the dam side of his pedigree.

* Paris is inbred 4S x 4D to the stallion Regulus, meaning that he appears fourth generation on the sire side of his pedigree and fourth generation on the dam side of his pedigree.

^ Paris is inbred 5S x 5S x 5D x 4D to the stallion Godolphin Arabian, meaning that he appears fifth generation twice on the sire side of his pedigree, as well as fifth and fourth generation once each on the dam side of his pedigree.
