= Eclipse (horse) =

British Thoroughbred racehorse

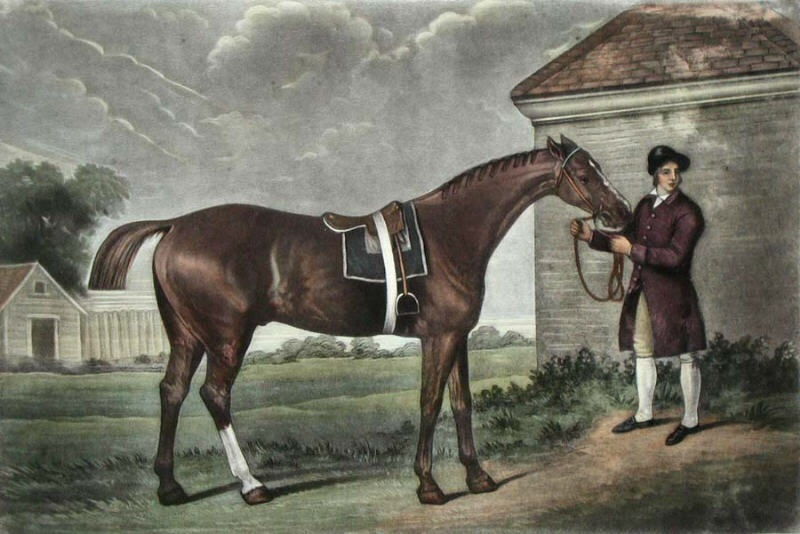
- Eclipse (by George Stubbs)
- Sire: Marske
- Grandsire: Squirt
- Dam: Spilletta
- Damsire: Regulus
- Sex: Stallion
- Foaled: 1 April 1764 near East Ilsley, Berkshire, England
- Died: 26 February 1789 (aged 24)
- Country: Great Britain
- Colour: Chestnut
- Breeder: Duke of Cumberland
- Owner: William Wildman; Dennis O'Kelly; Lewis Burwell
- Trainer: Sullivan
- Record: 18 starts, 18 wins (plus 7 heats)
- Earnings: 2,149 guineas

Major wins
- Winchester King's Plate (1769); Salisbury King's Plate (1769); Canterbury King's Plate (1769); Lewes King's Plate (1769); Lichfield King's Plate (1769); Match race against Bucephalus (1770); Newmarket First Spring King's Plate (1770); Guilford King's Plate (1770); Nottingham King's Plate (1770); York King's Plate (1770); 6yo+ Great Subscription Purse (1770); Lincoln Heath King's Plate (1770); Newmarket October King's Plate (1770)

Honours
- Eclipse Stakes at Sandown Park (GB); Prix Eclipse at Maisons-Laffitte (France); The Eclipse Awards (USA)
- Last updated on 29 October 2012

Eclipse (1 April 1764 – 26 February 1789) was an undefeated 18th-century British Thoroughbred racehorse who won 18 races, including 11 King's Plates. He raced before the introduction of the British Classic Races, at a time when four-mile heat racing was the norm. He was considered the greatest racehorse of his time and the expression, "Eclipse first, the rest nowhere" entered the English vernacular as an expression of dominance.

After retiring from racing, he became a very successful sire, whose offspring included three Epsom Derby winners: Young Eclipse, Saltram and Serjeant. He was also a successful sire of sires, and his sire line has become dominant in the modern Thoroughbred worldwide through descendants such as Nearco, Northern Dancer, Mr. Prospector and Sunday Silence.

== Breeding ==
Eclipse was foaled during and named after the solar eclipse of 1 April 1764, at Keats Gore, near East Ilsley in Berkshire, not at the Cranbourne Lodge stud of his breeder, Prince William Augustus, Duke of Cumberland, as many believe. This commonly recorded error is because of the prestige of Cranbourne Lodge. It was at Cranbourne that his sire, the Jockey Club Plate winner Marske (by Squirt from The Ruby Mare) stood. His dam, Spilletta (foaled 1749), was by Regulus, who was by the Godolphin Arabian. Eclipse's male-line great-grandsire was Bartlett's Childers, and his male-line great-great-grandsire was the Darley Arabian. Eclipse was a brother to the successful broodmare Proserpine. They were inbred to Snake in the fourth generation (4m x 4f) of their pedigree. After the death of Prince William in 1765, Eclipse was sold for 75 guineas to a sheep dealer from Smithfield, William Wildman.

Eclipse was a bright chestnut with a narrow blaze running down his face. He had a white stocking on his right hind leg. Eclipse was a big horse for his time, just over 16 hands (64 inches, 163 cm), and was an inch higher at the rump than at the withers. He was strong, sound and fast. He was sometimes criticized for having a large, unattractive head. His difficult temperament was well documented, and might have led to him being gelded. Instead he was turned over to a rough-rider, who worked him hard all day, and at night as well on poaching expeditions if the stories are to be believed. This treatment, rather than souring his disposition, settled Eclipse enough to allow him to be raced, although his jockeys never attempted to hold him.

== Racing career ==
Before Eclipse's first start at the age of five, a trial was arranged at Epsom (although the location has also been given as Mickleham). Bookmakers, trying to verify whether rumours about the horse were true, showed up but were too late — the trial had already been run. On their way home, though, they encountered an old woman who told them she had seen a horse with a white leg being chased by another, who she did not think would catch the horse with the white leg, even if he pursued him to the end of the world. Accordingly, when Eclipse started in his first race on 3 May 1769, a £50 Plate for horses who had never won, he was 4/1 on favourite. The race consisted of three heats of four miles each. Eclipse won easily.

After his second victory in a race in May 1769, Dennis O'Kelly purchased Eclipse in two stages. (50 percent in June 1769 for 700 guineas, 50 percent in April 1770 for 1,000 guineas). Supposedly, at this time O'Kelly used the famous phrase "Eclipse first and the rest nowhere", before making his bets for this race, although some sources have him saying this for the second heat of the horse's debut, referencing how at the time a horse that finished more than 200-240 yards behind would be considered 'distanced' and subsequently disqualified. His jockey was John Oakley, supposedly the only jockey who could handle Eclipse's temperamental manner and running style of holding his nose very close to the ground. Eclipse won the race and covered O'Kelly's bet.

His toughest challenge was a match race versus the highly regarded Bucephalus in April 1770. Bucephalus was game, but Eclipse was the easy winner. In August, he took on top class horses Tortoise and Bellario in the Great Subscription Purse at York, but at odds of 20/1 on, routed both of them, being over a furlong in front after two miles, and winning in a canter.

Eclipse won 18 races, including 11 King's Plates, supposedly without ever being fully extended and proving far superior to all competition. During his racing career, Eclipse ran over 63 miles and walked 1,400 miles to race meetings across England.

Eclipse is still remembered in the phrase "Eclipse first and the rest nowhere", snowcloned as "[name of competitor] first and the rest nowhere", referring to any dominating victory. This phrase is occasionally seen in American print media (most often in newspaper sport sections) but is more common in Britain.

He is attested to have covered 83 feet per second at top speed, and covered 25 feet in a single stride.

== Race record ==
Eclipse's race record
Date	Race name	Distance	Course	Prize	Odds	Runners	Place	Runner-up	Ref
3 May 1769	£50 Race	4 mile heats	Epsom Downs	£50	1/4	5	1	Gower	
29 May 1769	£50 Plate	2 mile heats	Ascot	£50	1/8	2	1	Crême de Barbade	
13 June 1769	King's Plate	4 mile heats	Winchester	100 gns	5/4	5	1	Turner's Slouch	
15 June 1769	50 Guinea Plate		Winchester	50 gns	N/A	1	1	Walkover	
28 June 1769	King's Plate		Salisbury	100 gns	N/A	1	1	Walkover	
29 June 1769	City Silver Bowl	4 mile heats	Salisbury	30 gns	1/10	3	1	Sulphur	
25 July 1769	King's Plate		Canterbury	100 gns	N/A	1	1	Walkover	
27 July 1769	King's Plate	4 miles	Lewes	100 gns	1/10	2	1	Kingston	
19 September 1769	King's Plate	3 miles	Lichfield		1/20	2	1	Tardy	
17 April 1770	Match race		Newmarket		4/6	2	1	Bucephalus	
19 April 1770	King's Plate	3.5 mile heats	Newmarket	100 gns	1/10	4	1	Diana	
5 June 1770	King's Plate		Guildford		N/A	1	1	Walkover	
3 July 1770	King's Plate		Nottingham		N/A	1	1	Walkover	
20 August 1770	King's Plate		York		N/A	1	1	Walkover	
23 August 1770	Subscription Purse	4	York	£319	1/20	3	1	Tortoise	
3 September 1770	King's Plate		Lincoln Heath	100 gns	N/A	1	1	Walkover	
3 October 1770	150 Guineas Race		Newmarket	150 gns	1/70	2	1	Corsican	
4 October 1770	King's Plate		Newmarket		N/A	1	1	Walkover	

In ten of the King's Plates, Eclipse carried 12 st, or 168 pounds, the highest weight (by one pound) that was carried by a winner in England up to 1840.

== Stud record ==
In 1771, Eclipse was retired to stud after a racing career of about 17 months due to lack of competition as nobody was betting on rival horses. Initially he stood at O'Kelly's Clay Hill Stud, near Epsom (Surrey), for a fee of 10 guineas which rose rapidly to 25 and then to 50 guineas a mare. During 1788, he was relocated to Cannons Stud, Edgware (Middlesex).

Overall, Eclipse sired 344 winners of more than £158,000 (although the number varies with different reports, ranging from 325 to 400).

=== Notable progeny ===
s = stallion, m = mare

Foaled	Name	Sex	Major Wins
1772	Planet	s	Jockey Club Plate, Weights and Scales Plate, 1200 Guineas Stakes
1773	Potoooooooo (Pot-8-Os)	s	1200 Guineas Stakes, Clermont Cup (x3), Jockey Club Plate (x3), Newmarket Whip (x2), Craven Stakes
1774	Jupiter	s	100 guineas sweep at Newmarket
1774	Satellite	s	Guildford King's Plate, Winchester King's Plate
1775	King Fergus	s	500 guineas sweep at Bath
1778	Joe Andrews	s	Stand Plate at York
1778	Mercury	s	Lewes King's Plate
1778	Young Eclipse	s	Epsom Derby
1780	Dungannon	s	Craven Stakes
1780	Saltram	s	Epsom Derby
1780	Volunteer	s	1200 Guineas Stakes, Cumberland Subscription Stakes
1781	Serjeant	s	Epsom Derby, 1200 Guineas Stakes
1782	Alexander	s	Ran at Newmarket in the late 1780s
1784	Annette	m	Epsom Oaks
1784	Don Quixote	s	
1784	Pegasus	s	Macaroni Stakes

Eclipse's daughters include Horatia, one of only twelve mares to produce two Derby winners: Archduke and Paris. She also produced two-time Doncaster Cup winner Stamford. Other daughters of Eclipse produced Derby winners John Bull and Skyscraper, and St. Leger winners Tartar, Remembrancer and Phoenomenon. Chanticleer, Haphazard, and Weasel are also noted as important runners out of Eclipse mares.

Eclipse was never the leading sire in Great Britain and Ireland, although he finished in second place 11 times, usually behind Herod. A book published in 1970 stated that the Royal Veterinary College had determined that nearly 80% of Thoroughbred racehorses had Eclipse in their pedigree. That percentage has naturally increased with time and the inevitable inbreeding in the Thoroughbred population. More recently it has been estimated that Eclipse is not only somewhere in the pedigree, but a tail-male ancestor of "95pc of contemporary thoroughbreds" or of "nearly every living thoroughbred."

This modern dominance comes mainly through a sire line established by Potoooooooo, although King Fergus would also found another successful branch leading to Ribot. Potoooooooo's grandson Waxy would lead the sire list in 1811, and Waxy's grandson Birdcatcher in turn led the sire list in 1852 and 1856. Birdcatcher's grandson Stockwell outdid them both, becoming leading sire seven times. Stockwell's grandson Bend Or founded a line that led four generations later to Phalaris The Phalaris line has several branches, notably through Nearco and Native Dancer.

In Great Britain and Ireland, the Eclipse sire line includes modern leading sires such as Sadler's Wells, Danehill, Galileo and Frankel. In North America, leading sires in his line include Bold Ruler (sire of Secretariat), Mr. Prospector (ancestor of American Pharoah), Danzig, Storm Cat, A.P. Indy, Giant's Causeway and Tapit. In Japan, Eclipse's sire line includes leading sires Sunday Silence, King Kamehameha and Deep Impact, while in Australia leading sires from his line include Redoute's Choice, Encosta De Lago and Fastnet Rock.

=== Sire line tree ===
A sire line is the term given to the bloodlines and male descendants from a single stallion.

Descendants of Eclipse (click to show)
- Eclipse
  - Planet
  - Potoooooooo
    - Coriander
    - Alderman
    - Asparagus
      - Teddy the Grinder
    - Waxy
      - Shock
      - Pavilion
      - Sir Walter Raleigh
      - Sasenagh
      - Ipswich
      - Waxy Pope
        - The Dandy
        - Prendergast
        - Starch
        - Canteen
        - Sligo
        - Trumpeter
        - Mount Eagle
        - Skylark
        - The Cardinal
      - Crispin
      - Whalebone
        - Waverley
        - Peter Fin
        - Moses
        - Longwaist
        - Camel
        - Chateau Margaux
        - Flexible
        - Stumps
        - Lap-Dog
        - Defence
        - Merman
        - Sir Hercules
        - The Exquisite
        - Cetus
        - Spaniel
        - Vestris
        - The Sea
      - Woful
        - Theodore
        - Wanton
      - Blucher
      - Quinola
      - Whisker
        - Abron
        - Caccia Patti
        - Mustachio
        - Swiss
        - Catterick
        - Memnon
        - Coulon
        - Economist
        - The Colonel
        - Emancipation
        - Lawrie Todd
        - Perion
        - Whisker
      - Milton
      - Inferior
      - Anti-Gallican
    - Champion
    - Tyrant
    - Vespasian
    - Worthy
      - Podargus
      - Musician
  - Jupiter
    - Ganymede
    - Thunderbolt
    - Jupiter
    - Sir Walter
  - Satellite
  - King Fergus
    - Honest Tom
    - Overton
      - Cockboat
      - Cockfighter
        - Gilliver
        - Merryfield
      - John O'Groat
      - Rolla
      - Alonzo
    - Poor Jack
    - Young Traveller
    - Ormond
    - Beningbrough
      - Ashton
      - Blue Devil
      - Harefoot
      - Orville
        - Octavius
        - Muley
        - Belville
        - Dinmont
        - Fulford
        - Don Juan
        - Ebor
        - Fitz Orville
        - Allegro
        - Master Henry
        - Andrew
        - Richard
        - Bizarre
        - Emilius
        - Ganymede
        - Vargas
        - Pollio
      - Delville
      - Rygantino
      - Thorn
      - Bedalian
      - Hylas
      - Phlebotomist
      - Scud
        - Sam
        - Steel Trap
        - Sailor
        - Actaeon
      - Windle
      - Trophonius
      - Prince of Orange
    - Brother to Overton
    - Deserter
    - Hambletonian
      - Camillus
        - Oiseau
        - Magistrate
        - Rhadamanthus
        - Consul
      - Whitelock
        - Blacklock
      - Camerton
        - Bay Camerton
      - Anticipation
    - Garswood
    - Johnny
      - Master Jackey
    - Warter
  - Vertumnus
    - Baronet
      - Baronet
  - Boudrow
  - Obscurity
    - Bacchus
    - Bompard
  - Joe Andrews
    - Dick Andrews
      - Cwrw
      - Tramp
        - Bay Burton
        - Barefoot
        - Lottery
        - Brother to Bay Burton
        - Speculation
        - Zinganee
        - Tyke
        - Donegani
        - Little Red Rover
        - Liverpool
        - St Giles
        - Dangerous
        - Scroggins
        - Cornborough
      - Biddick
      - Sir Richard
      - Merrymaker
  - Mercury
    - Precipitate
      - Petworth
      - Bobtail
        - Bobadil
      - Tag
      - Hackney
      - Langton
        - Langtonian
      - Sir Reginald
    - Silver
    - Gohanna
      - Cardinal Beaufort
      - Cerberus
        - Captain Candid
      - Golumpus
        - Beverley
        - Catton
        - Otterington
        - Uncle Toby
        - Savernake
        - Aimwell
      - Canopus
        - Scarecrow
        - Centaur
      - Hedley
        - Idle Boy
        - Frolic
        - Prince Leopold
      - Trafalgar
      - Brighton
      - Coriolanus
      - Election
        - Manfred
        - Regent
        - Gustavus
        - Manzeppa
        - Rufus
      - Cestrian
      - Scorpion
      - Interloper
      - The Dandy
      - Punic
      - Robin Adair
      - Young Gohanna
        - Legal Tender
      - Wanderer
        - Gaberlunzie
        - Rasselas
        - Young Wanderer
      - Belleropheron
      - Skim
    - Hermes
  - Young Eclipse
    - Young Eclipse
  - Dungannon
    - Lurcher
      - Chance
        - Grimalkin
    - Hambleton
    - Bedford
      - Gallatin
    - Young Dungannon
    - Dungannon
    - Boaster
  - Saltram
    - Whiskey
      - Whirligig
      - Orlando
      - Young Whiskey
      - Trafalgar
      - Pioneer
      - Juniper
      - Patriot
      - Marmion
        - Jack Spigot
        - Herold
    - Royalist
    - Whip
      - Hickory
      - Whip
        - Short Whip
    - Oscar
  - Volunteer
    - Stirling
    - Spread Eagle
      - American Eagle
      - Paragon
    - Volunteer
    - Magic
    - Eagle
      - Diomed Eagle
    - Fop
  - Serjeant
  - Alexander
    - Tityrus
    - Hephastion
  - Meteor
    - Copenhagen
  - Don Quixote
    - Sancho
      - Cato
      - Banquo
      - Cannon Ball
      - Prime Minister
    - Cervantes
    - Whitenose
    - Amadis
      - Palmerin
  - Pegasus
    - Expedition
      - Sea Gull
        - American Boy
    - Peace-Maker
    - Alonzo
    - Hippomenes
  - Brush

== Death ==
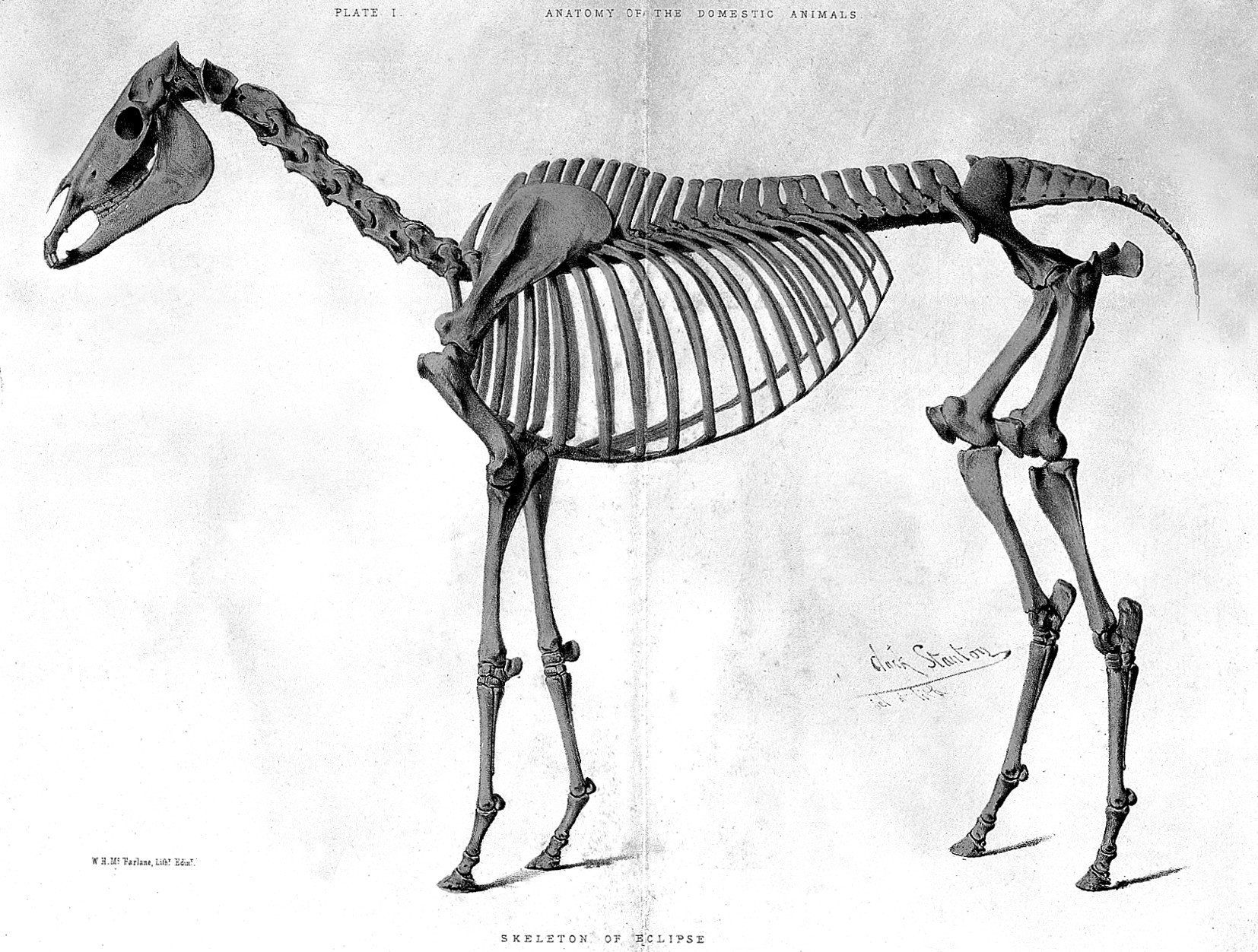
Skeleton of Eclipse

Eclipse died due to an attack of colic on 27 February 1789, at the age of 24. His skeleton is now housed at the Royal Veterinary College, Hertfordshire, in the Learning Resource Centre named after him, although it cannot be said for certain whether all the bones displayed are really from Eclipse. His hooves were made into inkstands, although the fact that there are at least five Eclipse-hoof inkstands casts some doubt on the authenticity of some. Hairs from his tail have also been used for decorations.

A necropsy on Eclipse by Charles Vial de Sainbel found that he had an abnormally large heart, weighing 14 pounds (6.4 kg). This trait has been referred to in the context of thoroughbreds as the "X Factor" Theory. While the theory has yet to be proven, it has gained popularity due to the large hearts seen occasionally in his descendants, including Secretariat and Phar Lap.

== Honours and analysis ==
The Eclipse Awards are American Thoroughbred horse-racing awards named after Eclipse. They honour the champions of the sport, and are sponsored by the National Thoroughbred Racing Association (NTRA), Daily Racing Form and the National Turf Writers Association, who select all finalists at the end of the year. The most prestigious of these Awards is the Eclipse Award for Horse of the Year title.

The Eclipse Stakes is a Group 1 flat race in the United Kingdom for three-year-olds and older run over a distance of 1¼ miles and 7 yards (2,018 metres) at Sandown Park.

Eclipse Press is the book-publishing division of Blood-Horse Publications, an international publishing house for top Thoroughbred and general equine magazines, books, videos, CD-ROMs and annual references.

Sheffield-based Eclipse tools, now part of Spear & Jackson, took their name and their Eclipse first... slogan in 1909 from the horse.

The life story of Eclipse inspired the novel O'Kelly's Eclipse by screenwriter Arthur Weiss.

Nicholas Clee's Eclipse: The Story of the Rogue, the Madam and the Horse That Changed Racing is a biography of Eclipse and of the people connected to him, among them the gambler Dennis O'Kelly and the brothel madam Charlotte Hayes. Other biographies of Eclipse include Michael Church's Eclipse: The Horse, The Race, The Awards (2000), and Theodore Cook's 1907 book Eclipse and O'Kelly.

Contrary to popular belief, the Mitsubishi Eclipse was named for the racehorse, and not for the natural phenomenon.

== Pedigree ==
At the time of Eclipse's birth, stud records were maintained by the individual breeder with no central authority. Record-keeping was somewhat haphazard, compounded by spelling and transcription errors, and the fact that the names of mares were often not recorded. In 1791, James Weatherby and William Sydney Towers pieced together the General Stud Book, which is the source of the pedigree shown below. However, there are still several debated entries of interest to pedigree experts. Details of the issues can be found in Appendix 2 of Nicholas Clee's book on Eclipse. The most notable issues are summarized below.

According to all official records, Eclipse's sire was Marske (written as 'Mask' in a 1764 entry in the Royal Stud Book). Marske was a moderately successful racehorse who had little early success in the breeding shed. His stud fee at the time of Eclipse's conception was only half a guinea, though it subsequently grew to 30 guineas. During Eclipse's lifetime, however, it was rumoured that his real sire was Shakespeare, who was a somewhat better racehorse than Marske and was said to resemble Eclipse more closely. According to a contemporary source, Eclipse's dam was covered in 1763 first by Shakespeare and later by Marske, and paternity was based on Eclipse's foaling date corresponding to the date of the second breeding session. Since both Marske and Shakespeare were great-grandsons of the Darley Arabian, Eclipse would still descend from that stallion.

Eclipse's dam was Spilletta, who is shown as a bay in the General Stud Book but recorded as a chestnut in the personal records of her second owner, the Duke of Ancaster. There is again confusion over her breeding: The General Stud Book shows her sire as the undefeated Regulus (by the Godolphin Arabian) but a 1754 racing calendar shows her sire as Sedbury (by the Byerley Turk). Spilletta's dam was Mother Western, whose paternity is subject to similar confusion between Scarborough Colt and Easby Snake. Spilletta raced only once, finishing last in a field of three. In her first eight years as a broodmare, Spilletta produced only one live foal. In 1760, she was bred to Markse for the first time with no issue. Three years later, they were mated again: Eclipse was the result.

Pedigree of Eclipse, chestnut stallion, 1764
Sire Marske (GB) br. 1750	Squirt ch. 1732	Bartlett's Childers b. 1716	Darley Arabian b. c1700
Sire Marske (GB) br. 1750	Squirt ch. 1732	Bartlett's Childers b. 1716	Betty Leedes
Sire Marske (GB) br. 1750	Squirt ch. 1732	Sister to Old Country Wench*	Snake*
Sire Marske (GB) br. 1750	Squirt ch. 1732	Sister to Old Country Wench*	Grey Wilkes
Sire Marske (GB) br. 1750	The Ruby Mare	Hutton's Blacklegs	Hutton's Bay Turk
Sire Marske (GB) br. 1750	The Ruby Mare	Hutton's Blacklegs	Coneyskins mare
Sire Marske (GB) br. 1750	The Ruby Mare	Bay Bolton mare	Bay Bolton
Sire Marske (GB) br. 1750	The Ruby Mare	Bay Bolton mare	Fox Cub mare
Dam Spilletta (GB) b. 1749	Regulus ch. 1739	Godolphin Arabian b. c.1724	(unknown)
Dam Spilletta (GB) b. 1749	Regulus ch. 1739	Godolphin Arabian b. c.1724	(unknown)
Dam Spilletta (GB) b. 1749	Regulus ch. 1739	Grey Robinson	Bald Galloway
Dam Spilletta (GB) b. 1749	Regulus ch. 1739	Grey Robinson	Sister to Old Country Wench*
Dam Spilletta (GB) b. 1749	Mother Western	Easby Snake	Snake*
Dam Spilletta (GB) b. 1749	Mother Western	Easby Snake	Akaster Turk mare
Dam Spilletta (GB) b. 1749	Mother Western	Old Montagu mare	Old Montagu
Dam Spilletta (GB) b. 1749	Mother Western	Old Montagu mare	Hautboy mare (Family: 12)

Note: b. = Bay, ch. = Chestnut, br. = Brown

* Eclipse is inbred 3S x 4D to the mare Sister to Old Country Wench, meaning that she appears third generation on the sire side of his pedigree and fourth generation on the dam side of his pedigree.

*^ Eclipse is inbred 4S x 5D x 4D to the stallion Snake, meaning that he appears fourth generation on the sire side of his pedigree and fifth generation (via Old Country Wench) and fourth generation on the dam side of his pedigree.

== See also ==
- List of leading Thoroughbred racehorses
- List of racehorses
