= Anthony Wheatley =

British jockey (died 1838)

Personal information
- Born: 176?
- Died: 1838
- Occupation: Jockey

Horse racing career
- Sport: Horse racing

Major racing wins
- Major races Epsom Derby (1795)

Significant horses
- Spread Eagle

Anthony Wheatley (176? – 1838) was an Epsom Derby winning jockey of the 18th century. He won the 1795 Derby riding Spread Eagle, a horse owned and bred by Sir Frank Standish and trained by Richard Prince. Wheatley's son Will also became a successful jockey – winning the Derby twice and 2,000 Guineas three times in the early 19th century.

He was active from the 1760s onwards and was mainly found riding at York.

== Major wins ==
(United Kingdom) Great Britain

- Epsom Derby – Spread Eagle (1795)

== Bibliography ==
- Mortimer, Roger; Onslow, Richard; Willett, Peter (1978). Biographical Encyclopaedia of British Racing. London: Macdonald and Jane's. ISBN 0-354-08536-0.
- Pick, William; Johnson, R (1805). The Turf Register and Sportsman & Breeder's Stud-book. A Bartholoman.
- Pick, William; Johnson, R (1822). The Turf Register and Sportsman & Breeder's Stud-book. Vol. III. A Bartholoman.
