= Charles Anguish =

English cricketer

Personal information
- Born: 13 February 1769; Bloomsbury, Middlesex, England
- Died: 25 May 1797 (aged 28); Cape of Good Hope, British controlled Cape Colony (Note: The Cape of Good Hope was controlled by the Dutch East India Company from 1652 as the Dutch Cape Colony. During the French Revolutionary Wars it was invaded by the British in 1795 who controlled it until 1803 when it was ceded to the Batavian Republic before being invaded again by the British in 1806, after which the British controlled Cape Colony was established.)

Charles Anguish (13 February 1769 – 25 May 1797) was an English soldier and cricketer in the late 18th century. He was a member of the White Conduit Club and an early member of the Marylebone Cricket Club (MCC). He made his important debut during the 1789 season, playing for MCC, and is known to have played in 32 important matches from then until 1795, most frequently appearing for MCC, as well as a number of other matches for the club.

Anguish was born at Bloomsbury in Middlesex in 1767, as a member of the Anguish family which owned land across East Anglia. He was the son of Thomas Anguish, who served as the Accountant-General in the Court of Chancery, and was educated at Eton College and later played for Old Etonians. He was nominated for a place at King's College, Cambridge in 1786 but did not attend the university, instead serving in the British Army.

In 1797 Anguish went to South Africa as part of the first British party to control the Cape of Good Hope in 1797 with George Macartney, 1st Earl Macartney, the newly appointed Governor of the recently conquered Cape. Anguish arrived at Table Bay on 4 May and was appointed as Comptroller of Customs. He is sometimes held to be the first person to have played in what is now South Africa, although there is no evidence that he ever did so.

Less than a month after arriving at the Cape, Anguish died on 25 May, committing suicide after having been unwell and taking medication. His obituary in The Gentleman's Magazine described him as "a young man of abilities and of a good temper, but with so odd a cast of manners that he was perpetually on the brink of a quarrel, even with those who knew his intentions were quite harmless, and could make every allowance for his peculiarities". Lady Anne Barnard, who knew Anguish at the Cape, wrote that he was a "good-humoured, easy-tempered young man" and that "I thought him rather a happy man"; in her view "mental malady had been produced by bodily malady only". He was buried at the Cape close to the Review Ground at the Castle of Good Hope.

== Bibliography ==
- Haygarth, Arthur (1996) [1862]. Scores & Biographies, Volume 1 (1744–1826). Kennington: Frederick Lillywhite. ISBN 978-19-00592-23-9.
