= Serjeant (horse) =

British Thoroughbred racehorse

- Sire: Eclipse
- Grandsire: Marske
- Dam: Aspasia
- Damsire: Herod
- Sex: Stallion
- Foaled: 1781
- Country: Kingdom of Great Britain
- Colour: Bay
- Breeder: Dennis O'Kelly
- Owner: Dennis O'Kelly
- Trainer: John Scott
- Record: 16:8-3-3

Major wins
- Epsom Derby (1784); Sion Stakes (1784); 1200 Guineas Stakes (1786); Matches against Cantator, Mousetrap, Balloon

Serjeant (1781 – after 1787) was a British Thoroughbred racehorse. In a career that lasted from spring 1784 to autumn 1787 he ran sixteen times and won eight races. In 1784 he won the fifth Epsom Derby, the first running of the race under its current name and distance. He stayed in training for a further three seasons, winning several important races at Newmarket, but disappeared from official records after his retirement from racing and does not appear to have been found a place at stud.

== Background ==
Serjeant was bred by his owner, Colonel Dennis O'Kelly. He was sired by O'Kelly's horse Eclipse, the dominant racehorse of his time who was undefeated in eighteen races before becoming one of the most important and influential stallion in the history of Thoroughbred racing. Serjeant was the second of three foals produced by the mare Aspasia, making him a brother to Dungannon, who won nineteen races and finished second to Saltram in the 1783 Derby.

== Racing career ==
=== 1784: three-year-old season ===
Serjeant made his first appearance at the Second Spring meeting at Newmarket in 1784. He started 1/3 favourite a 200 guinea Sweepstakes over ten furlongs and won beating Lord Clermont's colt Cantator.

At Epsom on 28 May, Serjeant started the 3/1 favourite for the Derby in a field of eleven runners. Ridden by John Arnull he won from the 20/1 outsider Carlo Khan, with Lord Derby's colt Dancer finishing third. The race was the first Derby run over the modern distance of one and a half miles: the four previous runnings had been held over one mile.

After a break of more than four months, Serjeant returned for two races at Newmarket's Second October meeting. The order in which these two races took place is not clear from the records. In a two-mile match race over the "Ditch In" course he started 1/4 favourite, but was beaten by Dancer for a prize of 500 guineas. Racing over the same course and distance he won the Sion Stakes, carrying six pounds more than his three opponents who included Dancer and Carlo Khan.

=== 1785: four-year-old season ===
Serjeant's first race as a four-year-old was the valuable Claret Stakes at Newmarket's First Spring Meeting, which usually took place in April. The race was run over the four-mile Beacon Course and included a consolation prize of two hogsheads of Claret for the runner-up. Serjeant finished unplaced behind the Prince of Wales's horse Hardwicke. At the next meeting he was beaten in a match by the Prince of Wales's horse Rockingham.

At the second October meeting Serjeant started the evens favourite for the "1400 Guineas" over two miles but finished third of the four runners behind Lord Grosvenor's horse Premier, with Dancer finishing second. At the same meeting he won a 300 guinea match race over two miles in which he conceded seven pounds to Cantator. At the next Newmarket meeting Colonel O'Kelly had to pay a forfeit when Serjeant was withdrawn from a match against Dancer.

=== 1786: five-year-old season ===
At the First Spring Meeting in 1786, Serjeant was beaten by Mr Dowson's horse Clayhall in a 200 guinea match race over the Beacon Course. Later at the same meeting he started the 2/5 favourite for the "1200 Guineas" over the Round Course against four opponents. He won the race from the Duke of Queensberry's horse Collector, with Carlo Khan unplaced. At the next meeting Colonel O'Kelly collected a forfeit from Lord Derby when Dancer was withdrawn from a match against Serjeant.

For the rest of the 1786 season, Serjeant raced away from Newmarket for the first time since his Derby win, but had little success. On 18 July at Winchester he contested a four-mile Sweepstakes in which he finished third to Mr Tetherington's horse Marplot. Ten days later he appeared at Stockbridge Racecourse where he finished last of the three runners over four miles behind Sir John Lade's horse Punch and Mr Watts' mare Miss Kingland. In September he ran at Maidenhead in the Ladies' Plate, a race run in four mile heats. He failed to figure in any of the four heats as Miss Kingsland took the prize by winning two of the heats and dead-heating in a third.

=== 1787: six-year-old season ===
At Newmarket's Second October meeting, Serjeant was matched against Mr Fox's five-year-old horse Balloon over the Beacon Course. He defeated his opponent at level weights to win a prize of 200 guineas and complete an unbeaten final season.

== Pedigree ==
Pedigree of Serjeant (GB), bay stallion, 1781
Sire Eclipse (GB) 1764	Marske; 1750	Squirt	Bartlett's Childers
Sire Eclipse (GB) 1764	Marske; 1750	Squirt	sister to Old Country Wench
Sire Eclipse (GB) 1764	Marske; 1750	The Ruby Mare	Hutton's Blacklegs
Sire Eclipse (GB) 1764	Marske; 1750	The Ruby Mare	Bay Bolton mare
Sire Eclipse (GB) 1764	Spilletta; 1749	Regulus	Godolphin Arabian
Sire Eclipse (GB) 1764	Spilletta; 1749	Regulus	Grey Robinson
Sire Eclipse (GB) 1764	Spilletta; 1749	Mother Western	Easby Snake
Sire Eclipse (GB) 1764	Spilletta; 1749	Mother Western	Old Montagu
Dam Aspasia (GB) 1775	Herod; 1758	Tartar	Partner
Dam Aspasia (GB) 1775	Herod; 1758	Tartar	Meliora
Dam Aspasia (GB) 1775	Herod; 1758	Cypron	Blaze
Dam Aspasia (GB) 1775	Herod; 1758	Cypron	Salome
Dam Aspasia (GB) 1775	Doris; 1770	Blank	Blank
Dam Aspasia (GB) 1775	Doris; 1770	Blank	Slipby mare
Dam Aspasia (GB) 1775	Doris; 1770	Helen	Spectator
Dam Aspasia (GB) 1775	Doris; 1770	Helen	Daphne (Family:33)
