= 1200 Guineas Stakes =

- Class: Horse
- Location: Newmarket Racecourse; Newmarket, England
- Inaugurated: 1757
- Race type: Flat / Thoroughbred

Race information
- Distance: 3 miles 6½ furlongs
- Surface: Turf
- Qualification: Five-year-olds
- Weight: 9 st (57 kg)

The 1200 Guineas Stakes was a flat horse race in Great Britain open to thoroughbreds aged five years. It was run at Newmarket and was one of the most important races of the second half of the 18th century.

== History ==
The 1200 Guineas was established in 1753 to be first run during Easter week of 1757. It was established by the Duke of Cumberland, 3rd Duke of Ancaster, 3rd Duke of Marlborough, 2nd Marquess of Rockingham, Marquess of Hartington, Marquess of Granby, 2nd Earl of Godolphin, 2nd Earl of Northumberland, 10th Earl of Eglinton, 3rd Duke of Richmond, 1st Earl of Gower and Thomas Duncombe. They agreed the race was to be run over the Beacon course at Newmarket and would be open to five-year-old horses and mares. They paid a 100 guineas subscription each to enter their horse and all runners would carry nine stone.

The race was initially to be run for five consecutive years from 1757, but was subsequently renewed in 1762.

== Records to 1786 ==
Leading owner (4 wins):

- 1st Baron Grosvenor – Cadet (1762), Ancient Pistol (1769), Bay Halkin (1770), Pigeon (1774)

== Winners to 1786 ==
Year	Winner	Owner
1757	Weasel	2nd Earl of Godolphin
1758	Turpin	Marquess of Granby
1759	Indicus	Thomas Duncombe
1760	Foxhunter	4th Duke of Devonshire
1761	Geres	Thomas Duncombe
1762	Cadet	1st Baron Grosvenor
1763	Antinous	3rd Duke of Grafton
1764	Prig	3rd Duke of Ancaster
1765	Traction	Sir James Lowther
1766	South East	Sir John Moore
1767	Volpone	1st Duke of Northumberland
1768	Sheet-Anchor	Sir John Moore
1769	Ancient Pistol	1st Baron Grosvenor
1770	Bay Halkin	1st Baron Grosvenor
1771	Charon	1st Earl of Farnham
1772	Amphion	2nd Viscount Bolingbroke
1773	Plato	1st Duke of Northumberland
1774	Pigeon	1st Baron Grosvenor
1775	Protector	2nd Viscount Bolingbroke
1776	Pillager	2nd Viscount Bolingbroke
1777	Planet	16th Earl of Ormonde
1778	Pot-8-Os	4th Earl of Abingdon
1779	Tickler	3rd Duke of Grafton
1780	Prince Ferdinand	Sir Lawrence Dundas
1781	Turnus	16th Earl of Ormonde
1782	Emetic	Mr Douglas
1783	King William	12th Earl of Derby
1784	Peru	12th Earl of Derby
1785	Volunteer	Dennis O'Kelly
1786	Serjeant	Dennis O'Kelly

== See also ==
- Horseracing in Great Britain
- List of British flat horse races
