= Spilletta =

British Thoroughbred racehorse

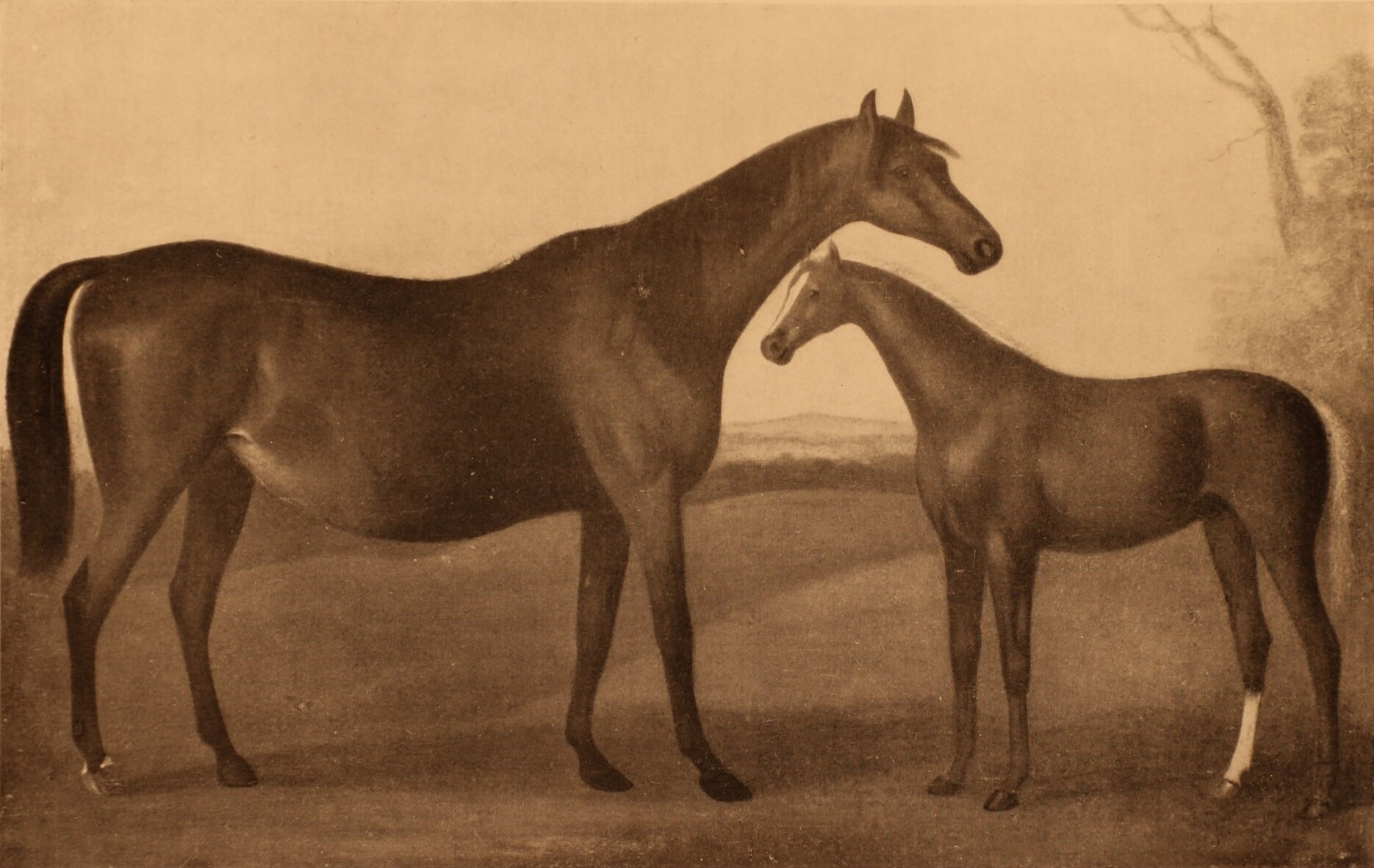
- Spilletta with Eclipse at foot
- Sire: Regulus
- Grandsire: Godolphin Arabian
- Dam: Mother Western
- Damsire: Smith's Son of Snake
- Sex: Mare
- Foaled: 1749
- Died: 1776
- Country: Great Britain
- Colour: Bay
- Breeder: Sir Robert Eden
- Record: 1 start, 0 wins

Spilletta (1749 – 1776) was a British Thoroughbred racehorse. She only raced once and is best known for being the dam of the undefeated Eclipse.

== Background ==
Spilletta was a bay filly bred by the Sir Robert Eden and foaled in 1749. She was sired by the undefeated Regulus. Regulus was also a very successful stallion, becoming Champion sire eight times. Regulus also sired Careless and Cato. Spilletta's dam was Mother Western, a daughter of Smith's son of Snake.

== Racing career ==
Spilletta only started one race, in April 1754 at Newmarket for a £50 Plate. She lost the race to Sir Charles Sedley's Royal, the Marquess of Hartington's Tantivy and Mr. Curzon's Jason.

== Stud career ==
Spilletta was a broodmare at the Duke of Cumberland stud. She produced five foals:

- Ariaden – a bay filly foaled in 1759 and sire by Crab.
- Eclipse – a chestnut stallion foaled in 1764 and sired by Marske. He was undefeated during his 18 race career and is generally considered one of the best racehorses ever. His wins included 11 King's Plates, the Great Subscription Purse and a match against Bucephalus. He sired Planet, Pot-8-Os, King Fergus, Mercury, Young Eclipse, Saltram, Serjeant and Annette. Eclipse is the sire-line ancestor of most Thoroughbreds alive today.
- Proserpine – a bay mare foaled in 1766 and sired by Marske. She never raced, but was the dam of Humbug and six others.
- Garrick – first called Hyperion, a chestnut stallion foaled in 1772 and sired by Marske. He won a 140 guineas race at Newmarket in 1777. As a stallion he stood at Newmarket and near Malton in Yorkshire.
- Briseis – a chestnut filly foaled in 1774 and sired by Chrysolite.

Spilletta died in 1776.

== Pedigree ==
Pedigree of Spilletta, bay mare, 1749
Sire Regulus (GB) 1739	Godolphin Arabian	(unknown)	(unknown)
Sire Regulus (GB) 1739	Godolphin Arabian	(unknown)	(unknown)
Sire Regulus (GB) 1739	Godolphin Arabian	(unknown)	(unknown)
Sire Regulus (GB) 1739	Godolphin Arabian	(unknown)	(unknown)
Sire Regulus (GB) 1739	Grey Robinson	Bald Galloway	St. Victor's Barb
Sire Regulus (GB) 1739	Grey Robinson	Bald Galloway	Grey Whynot
Sire Regulus (GB) 1739	Grey Robinson	Snake mare	Snake*
Sire Regulus (GB) 1739	Grey Robinson	Snake mare	Grey Wilkes
Dam Mother Western (GB)	Smith's son of Snake	Snake*	Lister's Turk
Dam Mother Western (GB)	Smith's son of Snake	Snake*	Hautboy mare
Dam Mother Western (GB)	Smith's son of Snake	Akaster Turk mare	Akaster Turk
Dam Mother Western (GB)	Smith's son of Snake	Akaster Turk mare	Pulleine's Arabian Colt mare
Dam Mother Western (GB)	Montagu mare	Montagu	(unknown)
Dam Mother Western (GB)	Montagu mare	Montagu	(unknown)
Dam Mother Western (GB)	Montagu mare	Hautboy mare	Hautboy
Dam Mother Western (GB)	Montagu mare	Hautboy mare	Brimmer mare

Note: b. = Bay, br. = Brown

* Spilletta is inbred 4S × 3D to the stallion Snake, meaning that he appears fourth generation on the sire side of his pedigree and third generation on the dam side of his pedigree.
