= Circulatory system of the horse =

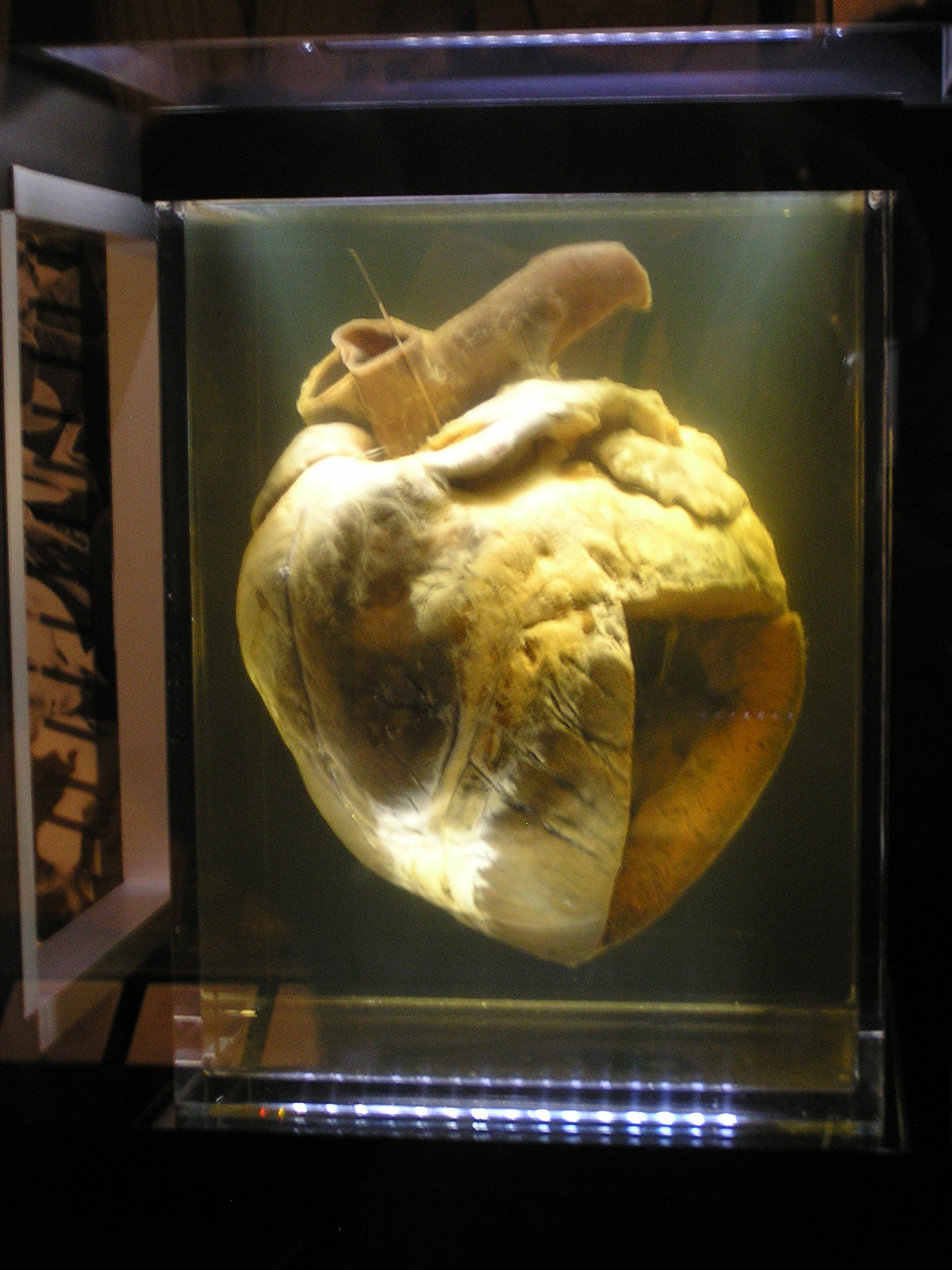
The heart of the great racehorse Phar Lap

The circulatory system of the horse consists of the heart, the blood vessels, and the blood.

== Anatomy ==
=== Heart ===
The equine heart is a muscular pump that circulates blood throughout the body. It is more globoid in shape than the human heart and consists of four chambers: the left and right atria, and the left and right ventricles. The average adult horse has a 3.6-kilogram (7.9 lb) heart, although it can be more than twice this size. The heart grows until the horse is 4 years of age, although it can increase slightly in size as a response to conditioning. Heart size does not necessarily correlate to the size of the horse.

Circulatory capacity is partially determined by functional mass of the heart and spleen. Once the oxygen has entered the bloodstream it must be transported to working muscle and waste products removed. The equine cardiovascular system is hugely compliant with a heart rate range from 20 to 240 beats per minute and a splenic red cell reserve able to double packed cell volume and oxygen delivery during maximal exercise. However, studies on Thoroughbreds have shown that the proportion of skeletal muscle exceeds 50% of body weight, and so the energetic capacity of the muscular system far exceeds the capacity of the cardiovascular system to deliver oxygen.

=== Blood and blood vessels ===
Blood is made up of red blood cells (erythrocytes), white blood cells (leukocytes), platelets and plasma. Produced in bone marrow, red blood cells are responsible for carrying oxygen to tissue and removing carbon dioxide, all via hemoglobin. White blood cells contribute, among other things, to defense against pathogens in the immune system. Plasma suspends the blood cells, contains clotting factors, and contributes to the greatest volume of blood.

The heart and blood vessels contain approximately 34 L (9.0 US gal) of blood in a 450 kg (990 lb) horse, which equates to about 76 mL/kg (1.2 oz/lb).

=== Spleen ===
The spleen removes damaged red blood cells from circulation. It also holds extra blood cells, releasing them during exertion to increase blood volume and the amount of oxygen transported to tissues.

=== Frog ===
The horse hoof contains a structural component known as the "frog", which covers the deeper structure of the hoof known as the digital cushion, a vessel-filled tissue. When the horse places weight on a leg, the ground pushes upward on the frog, compressing it and the underlying digital cushion. This results in squeezing blood out of the digital cushion, which then helps to pump it back up the leg, helping the heart to work against gravity. In cases of support-limb laminitis, the constant pressure on the frog prevents the refilling/emptying required for good circulation in the foot, likely leading to ischemic damage to the laminae.

== Pulse ==
The average pulse is 28–45 beats per minute (bpm) in a mature horse, but it can reach more than 250 bpm during maximum exertion. Depending on cardiovascular fitness and the horse's response to exercise, this drops significantly within 15–30 seconds after the horse stops galloping. A two-year-old horse may have a slightly faster pulse, and a 2–4-week-old foal normally has a pulse between 70 and 90 bpm. Heart rate may also increase when the horse is excited, overheated or suffering severe dehydration, has a fever, has an infection or sepsis, has experienced a great deal of blood loss, has advanced heart or lung disease, or is in shock. In these cases, the resting heart rate may be above 80 in an adult animal. When the heart rate is below 20 bpm, the horse may be hypothermic, or have pressure on the brain, heart disease, or collapsed circulation.

=== Determining heart rate ===
Heart rate may be determined with a stethoscope, placed just behind the left elbow of the animal. The pulse may also be felt when taken on an artery close to the skin, most commonly the facial artery as it passes under the lower jaw just ahead of the large cheek (masseter) muscle. The radial pulse may be taken right behind the back of the knee. The digital pulse is taken at the level of the fetlock on either of the paired arteries at this level. It is usually very faint and difficult to find, although certain problems, such as laminitis, or a foot abscess will make it quite strong.

== Blood pressure ==
Although blood pressure may vary greatly between animals, the average blood pressure for a standing horse is 120/70 mmHg. An indirect measurement of blood pressure may be taken with a cuff placed around the middle coccygeal artery at the base of the tail, or above the digital artery. It is usually taken to monitor circulation during surgery. Direct blood pressure measurements, via catheterization of an artery, provide a more accurate measurement, and are preferred for anesthetic monitoring.

== Gums ==
The gums of the horse can offer good clues to its circulatory health, reflecting perfusion of the tissues. Normal gums should be pink and slightly moist.

=== Gum color ===
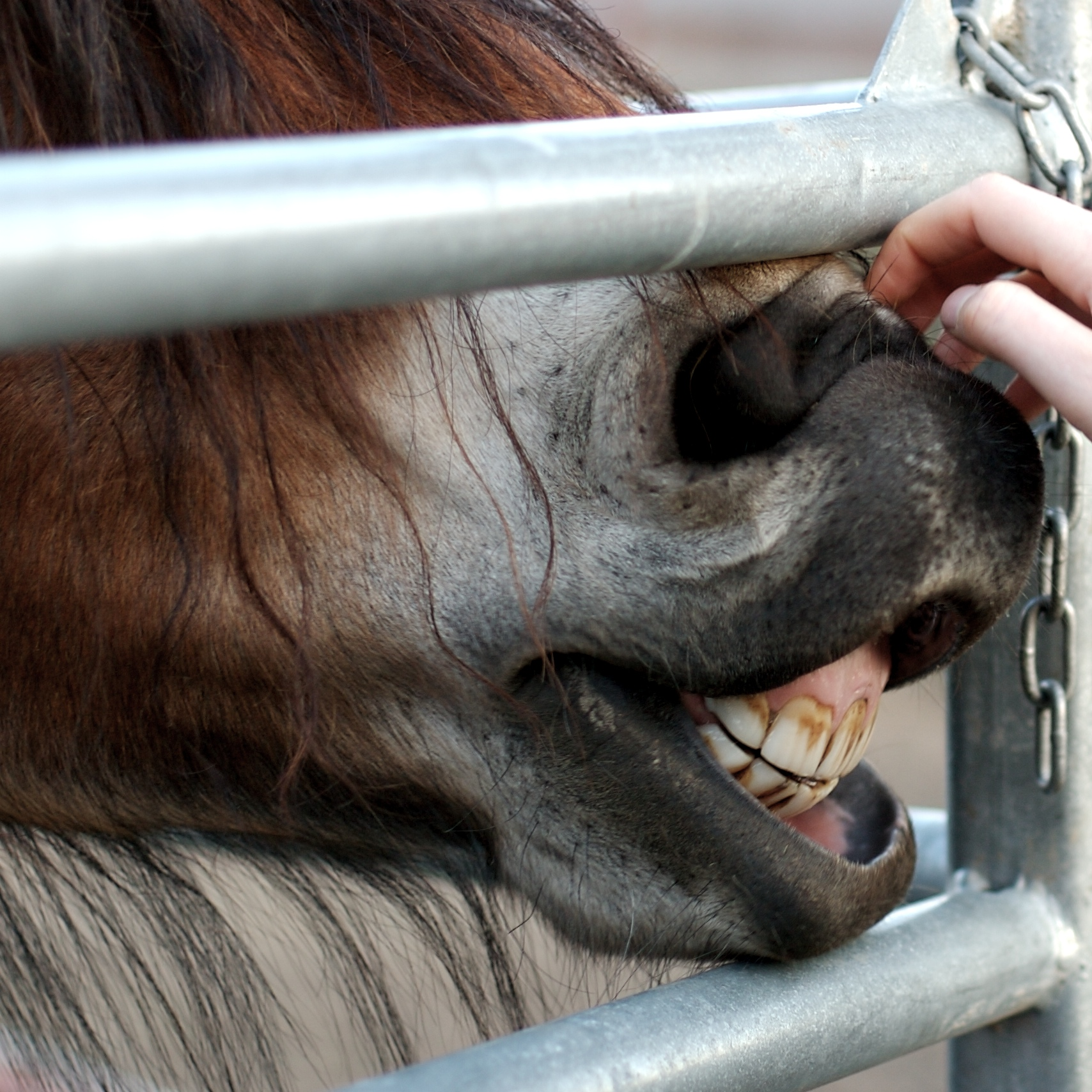
Healthy, pale pink gums

- Pale pink: the healthy color of gums, indicates good circulation. May brighten slightly after strenuous work due to an increase in circulation.
- Very pale pink: due to contracted capillaries. May indicate anemia, fever, or blood loss.
- Pale blue, gray, or whitish: indicative of anemia (low red blood cell count). May indicate severe shock or illness. A serious sign; often the best option is to call the veterinarian.
- Yellow with a tinge of brown: indicates jaundice and liver failure. Very serious and the veterinarian should see the animal immediately.
- Yellowish: a bright yellow tinge may occur if the horse has high levels of beta-carotene in its diet, such as horses that eat a good deal of alfalfa hay. Does not indicate any serious problem.
- Dark red: indicates enlarged capillaries, due to poisoning or sepsis. The veterinarian should be contacted immediately.

=== Capillary refill time ===
The capillary refill time is determined by pressing a finger against the horse's gums for about 2 seconds, so that a white "thumbprint" is left. After releasing, it should take no longer than 2 seconds for the gum color to return to normal. If it takes longer for the gum color to return, the horse may be experiencing dehydration or in severe cases shock.

== Cardiovascular capacity ==
Measurements of heart size do not appear to correlate directly with racing speed, stride length, or stride frequency. However, the ability of the body to pump blood can help identify athletic potential in an unproven horse. There is a hypothesis that measurements of a horse's heart at rest are directly related to the same horse's cardiac function during exercise. Therefore, attempts have been made to take resting measurements of horses using an electrocardiograph (ECG). This has led to the development of the "heart score", which measures the QRS interval. However, no work has correlated this to a horse's oxygen uptake (VO2Max) and the test has not been a good predictor of future athletic ability.

On the other hand, the Pearson correlation coefficient has been found to provide a link between oxygen uptake and echocardiographic measures. There is also evidence that maximal oxygen consumption and heart size are more important predictors of performance for horses that run longer distances because their energy consumption is mainly aerobic.

== "X factor" ==
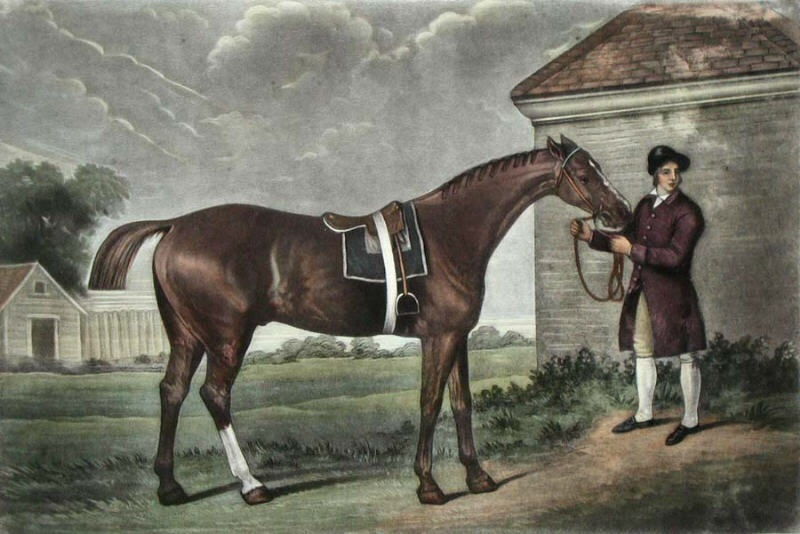
Eclipse, the horse proposed as the source of the X factor

The X factor theory proposes that a mutation within a gene located on the X chromosome of horses causes a larger-than-average heart. A larger-than average heart was documented in certain high-performance Thoroughbred, Quarter Horse, and Standardbred racehorses. It was first seen in Eclipse, at 6.4 kg (14 pounds). A large heart was also seen in Phar Lap (6.4 kg/14 lb), Sham (8.2 kg (18 lb)), and Secretariat (estimated at 10 kg (22 lb)). It is also proposed as a theory that the great producing mare Pocahontas was homozygous for the X factor. Large hearts have been found in four major Thoroughbred lines, all descendants of Eclipse: Princequillo, War Admiral, Blue Larkspur and Mahmoud. Many outstanding race horses such as Eclipse and Secretariat were noted for being excellent broodmare producers but generally failed to produce male offspring with the ability of their sires, thus the theory that the gene was carried only on the X chromosome meant that stallions with large hearts could only pass on the trait via their daughters.

The Heart Score, using electrocardiography, was developed over 40 years ago to describe the correlation between the QRS (intraventricular conduction time) complexes and the performances of several elite versus average racehorses with the belief that a large heart correlated to athletic ability. This belief is widespread and therefore a high heart score can increase the animal's worth in some circles. However, the X-Factor theory was never scientifically peer-reviewed and studies on the ECG protocol used, indicate that the Heart Score has little correlation to future racing ability. In addition, the gene(s) associated with cardiovascular dimensions and athletic performance have not been identified, nor has its mode of inheritance been determined; the condition may be influenced by multiple genetic factors.

== Disorders of the circulatory system ==
- Anemia
- Arrhythmia
- Exercise-induced pulmonary hemorrhage
- Heart disease
- Heart failure
