= Charles Hindley (jockey) =

British jockey

Personal information
- Occupation: Jockey

Horse racing career
- Sport: Horse racing

Major racing wins
- Major races Epsom Derby (1781, 1783, 1785); Epsom Oaks (1784, 1792)

Significant horses
- Aimwell, Saltram, Stella, Volante, Young Eclipse

Charles Hindley was an 18th-century British Thoroughbred jockey, who won three of the first six runnings of the Derby, the country's most prestigious horse race. These winners were Young Eclipse (1781), Saltram (1783) and Aimwell (1785). He also won the 1784 Oaks on Stella and 1792 Oaks on Volante.

== Major wins ==
(United Kingdom) Great Britain

- Epsom Derby – (3) – Young Eclipse (1781), Saltram (1783), Aimwell (1785)
- Epsom Oaks – (2) – Stella (1784), Volante (1792)

== Bibliography ==
- Wright, Howard (1986). The Encyclopaedia of Flat Racing. London: Robert Hale. ISBN 0-7090-2639-0.
