= Will Wheatley =

British jockey

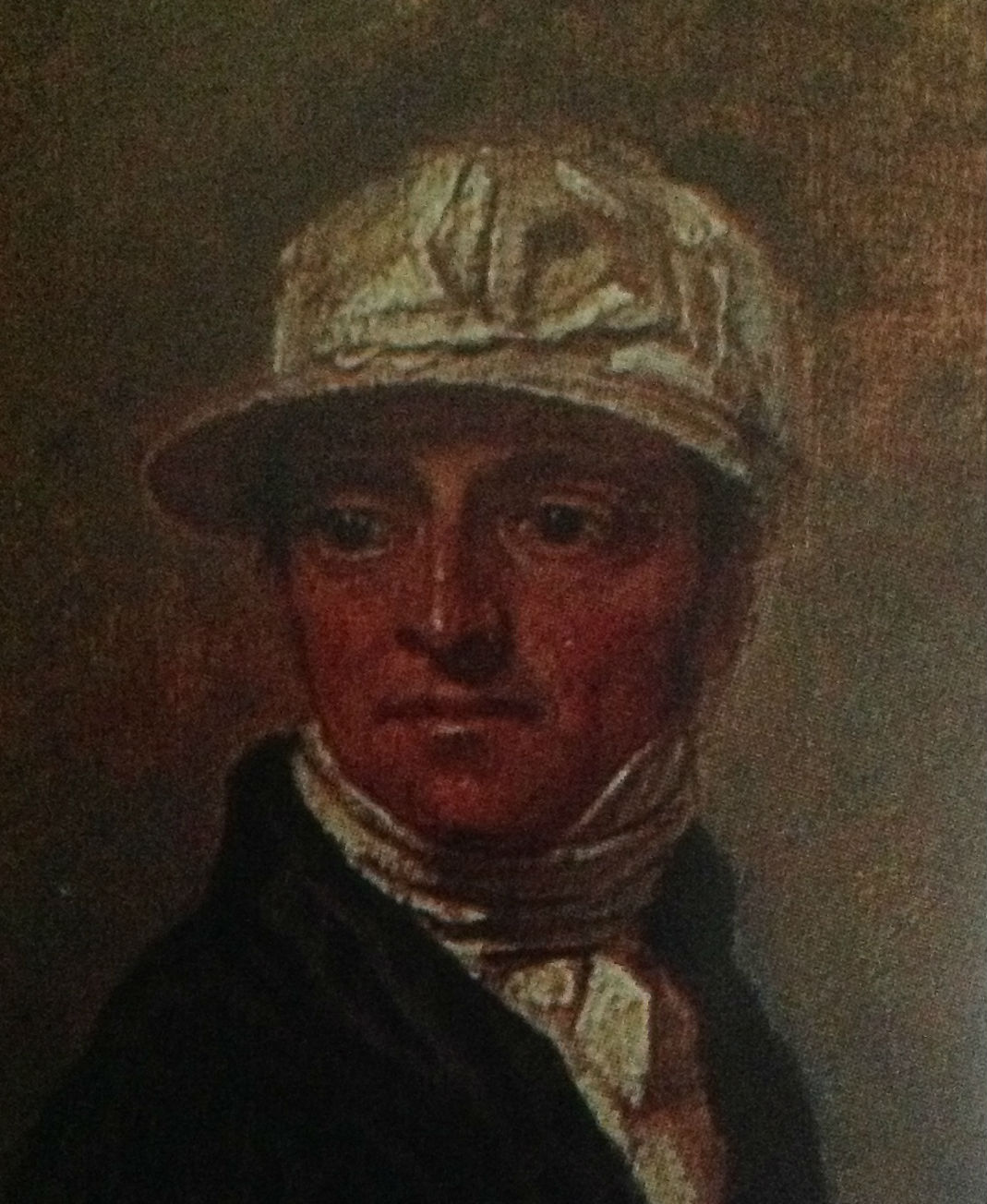
- Will Wheatley, jockey, from a study of Sam Chifney Jr, Will Wheatley and Jem Robinson by Ben Marshall (1818)

Personal information
- Born: 1786 Cambridgeshire
- Died: 1848 (aged 61–62) Kingsland, London
- Occupation: Jockey

Horse racing career
- Sport: Horse racing

Major racing wins
- British Classic Race wins as jockey: 2,000 Guineas (1817, 1823, 1824); Epsom Derby (1816, 1831)

Significant horses
- Mameluke, Manfred, Marcellus, Nicolo, Prince Leopold, Schahriar, Spaniel

William Wheatley (1786–1848) was a British Classic winning jockey of the early 19th century. His father was the 1795 Derby-winning jockey, Anthony Wheatley.

He was, according to the Sporting Magazine of 1831, "one of the best jockeys in England." He was particularly known for creeping up slowly during a race to win unexpectedly. This was shown to memorable effect in the 1831 Derby. Wheatley was booked to ride 50/1 outsider, Spaniel, a horse known for only possessing one steady pace. The race principals ran together in a tactical battle and appeared to have forgotten about Wheatley on the unfancied Spaniel, who racing at his customary pace, "came up with perfect ease... [and] won in a most triumphant style". Wheatley's ride was deemed "a splendid performance." Despite this, Spaniel has gone down in history as possibly the worst ever Derby winner. He was also known for having an untainted character, and in Spaniel's Derby he had had a £25 bet at odds of 40/1 on his mount winning, only to cancel it at the last minute, thereby missing out on £1000.

Wheatley rode the Derby winner Mameluke in some of his best races (although not the Derby itself). One of his most noted rides was in the "ever-memorable" Ascot Gold Cup when he rode Mameluke against Zinganee, ridden by Sam Chifney, Jr.

His principal patron was Lord Lowther.

William Wheatley lived up to the 1840s at Newmarket where his father and family had settled but died at Kingsland, then a small settlement in Middlesex but now part of Hackney, in February 1848 aged about 62.

== Major wins ==
=== Classic races ===
(United Kingdom) Great Britain

- 2,000 Guineas – (3) – Manfred (1817), Nicolo (1823), Schahriar (1824)
- Epsom Derby – (2) – Prince Leopold (1816), Spaniel (1831)

=== Selected other races ===
- Ascot Gold Cup - Marcellus (1823)

== Bibliography ==
- Mortimer, Roger; Onslow, Richard; Willett, Peter (1978). Biographical Encyclopaedia of British Racing. London: Macdonald and Jane's. ISBN 0-354-08536-0.
- "Quarterly Review: The Turf". The Museum of Foreign Literature, Science and Art. 23. Philadelphia: E. Littell & T. Holden. 1833.
- "Newmarket Craven Meeting". Sporting Magazine:Or, Monthly Calendar of the Transactions of the Turf, the Chase and Every Other Diversion Interesting to the Man of Pleasure, Enterprize, and Spirit. 3 (13). Rogerson & Tuxford: 34–42. May 1831.
- "Epsom Races". Sporting Magazine:Or, Monthly Calendar of the Transactions of the Turf, the Chase and Every Other Diversion Interesting to the Man of Pleasure, Enterprize, and Spirit. 3 (14). Rogerson & Tuxford: 74–80. June 1831.
- Wildrake, ed. (1841). The Cracks of the Day. George Tattersall.
