= Saltram (horse) =

British Thoroughbred racehorse

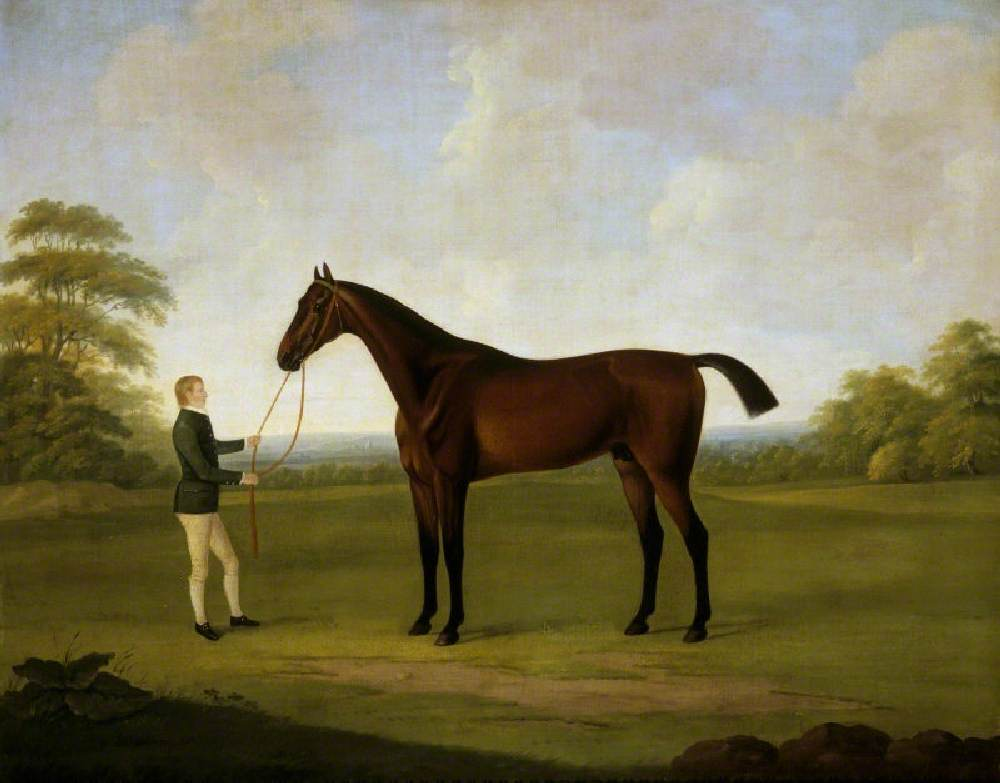
- Saltram with a Stable Lad, by John Nost Sartorius (1783)
- Sire: Eclipse
- Grandsire: Marske
- Dam: Virago
- Damsire: Snap
- Sex: Stallion
- Foaled: 1780
- Died: 1802
- Country: Kingdom of Great Britain
- Colour: Brown
- Breeder: John Parker
- Owner: John Parker; George, Prince of Wales
- Trainer: Francis Neale
- Record: 8:4-3-1

Major wins
- Epsom Derby (1783)

Saltram (1780–1802) was a British Thoroughbred racehorse and sire. In a career that lasted from spring 1783 to May 1785 he ran eight times and won four races. In 1783 he won the fourth running of The Derby on his third racecourse appearance. He won one race in 1784 and was then sold to George, Prince of Wales for whom he won a race at Newmarket in 1785 before being retired to stud. After having some success as a stallion in England he was exported to the United States where he died in 1802.

== Background ==
Saltram was a brown horse standing 15.3 hands high bred by General John Parker who was elevated to the Peerage as Lord Boringdon in 1784. Parker was from Plympton in Devon and named the colt after the nearby Saltram House. Saltram was described as a "beautiful" horse of "great strength" despite "having lost one eye". He was sired by Dennis O'Kelly's Eclipse, the dominant racehorse of his time who was undefeated in eighteen races before becoming one of the most important and influential stallions in Thoroughbred history. Saltram was the fifth of eleven foals born to Mr Parker's mare Virago went on to produce the 1787 Epsom Oaks winner Annette and was the female-line ancestor of the Derby winners Ditto, Pan and Gustavus.

== Racing career ==
=== 1783: three-year-old season ===
Saltram made his first racecourse appearance at Newmarket in the spring of 1783. At the Craven meeting he ran in a ten furlong Sweepstakes "Across the Flat" and won the 300 guinea prize by beating Mr Douglas's unnamed colt by Justice. He then finished second in the Cumberland Stakes, also at Newmarket.

There were thirty-six entries but only six runners for the Derby at Epsom on 29 May and Saltram was made 5/2 joint favourite with Dennis O'Kelly's colt Cornet. The 1783 edition of the race was the last to be run over one mile, before the distance was extended to one and a half miles in 1784. Ridden by Charles Hindley, Saltram won from O'Kelly's second choice runner Dungannon, followed by Parlington, Gonzales, Cornet and the future St Leger winner Phoenomenon. Saltram did not run again as a three-year-old: a scheduled match race in October over two miles against Lord Egremont's colt Rinaldo was cancelled, with Lord Egremont paying a 50 guinea forfeit.

=== 1784: four-year-old season ===
Saltram returned as a four-year-old to finish third to Gonzales in the Claret Stakes at Newmarket in April. At the next Newmarket meeting Saltram ran a match race over the Rowley Mile course against Lord Foley's colt Oliver Cromwell. He started the 4/5 favourite and defeated his opponent at level weights to win the 100 guinea prize.

After a break of five months, Saltram returned to Newmarket in October for a 500 guinea handicap. He was made odds on favourite, but finished second to Balance, a colt owned by Lord Grosvenor. After this race he was sold by Lord Boringdon to the Prince of Wales.

=== 1785: five-year-old season ===
Saltram ran twice for his new owner at the First Spring meeting at Newmarket in 1785. In the Craven Stakes, run at weight-for-age over ten furlongs, he finished second of the twelve runners to Dungannon at odds of 8/1. He then ran in a 200 guinea Sweepstakes over the Abingdon Mile course, which he won by defeating Lord Clermont's colt Cantator to whom he was conceding eighteen pounds.

== Stud career ==
Saltram began his career as a stallion at the Prince of Wales's private stud. From 1790 onwards he was made available to the public at a variety of British studs. In 1791 he stood at Aston Clinton, near Tring in Hertfordshire at a fee of twenty guineas, making him one of the most expensive stallions in England. By 1795, he had been moved to Carshalton in Surrey, at a fee of 10 guineas, with a guinea for the groom. By 1798, his fee had fallen to five guineas and he was standing at Mr Haynes's Livery Stable, Great Portland Street, London. The best of his offspring were Oscar, who won the Craven Stakes and the Oatlands Stakes, and Whiskey, a successful sire whose progeny included the Derby winner Eleanor.

In 1799 he was bought by William Lightfoot and exported to stand as a stallion at Sandy Point, Charles City County, Virginia where he had some success as a sire of broodmares. Saltram died in Virginia in 1802.

== Sire line tree ==
- Saltram
  - Whiskey
    - Whirligig
    - Orlando
    - Young Whiskey
    - Trafalgar
    - Pioneer
    - Juniper
    - Patriot
    - Marmion
      - Jack Spigot
      - Herold
  - Royalist
  - Whip
    - Hickory
    - Whip
      - Short Whip
        - Harry Bluff
          - Steel Dust
  - Oscar

== Pedigree ==
Pedigree of Saltram (GB), brown stallion, 1780
Sire Eclipse (GB) 1764	Marske; 1750	Squirt	Bartlett's Childers
Sire Eclipse (GB) 1764	Marske; 1750	Squirt	sister to Old Country Wench
Sire Eclipse (GB) 1764	Marske; 1750	Ruby mare	Hutton's Blacklegs
Sire Eclipse (GB) 1764	Marske; 1750	Ruby mare	Bay Bolton mare
Sire Eclipse (GB) 1764	Spilletta; 1749	Regulus*	Godolphin Arabian*
Sire Eclipse (GB) 1764	Spilletta; 1749	Regulus*	Grey Robinson*
Sire Eclipse (GB) 1764	Spilletta; 1749	Mother Western	Easby Snake
Sire Eclipse (GB) 1764	Spilletta; 1749	Mother Western	Old Montagu mare
Dam Virago (GB) 1764	Snap; 1750	Snip	Flying Childers
Dam Virago (GB) 1764	Snap; 1750	Snip	sister to Soreheels
Dam Virago (GB) 1764	Snap; 1750	sister to Slipby	Fox
Dam Virago (GB) 1764	Snap; 1750	sister to Slipby	Gipsey
Dam Virago (GB) 1764	Regulus mare 1757	Regulus*	Godolphin Arabian*
Dam Virago (GB) 1764	Regulus mare 1757	Regulus*	Grey Robinson*
Dam Virago (GB) 1764	Regulus mare 1757	sister 2 to Othello	Crab
Dam Virago (GB) 1764	Regulus mare 1757	sister 2 to Othello	Miss Slamerkin (1729) (Family:7)

* Saltram is inbred 3S x 3D to the stallion Regulus, meaning that he appears third generation on the sire side of his pedigree, and third generation on the dam side of his pedigree.
