= Bucephalus (racehorse) =

British Thoroughbred racehorse

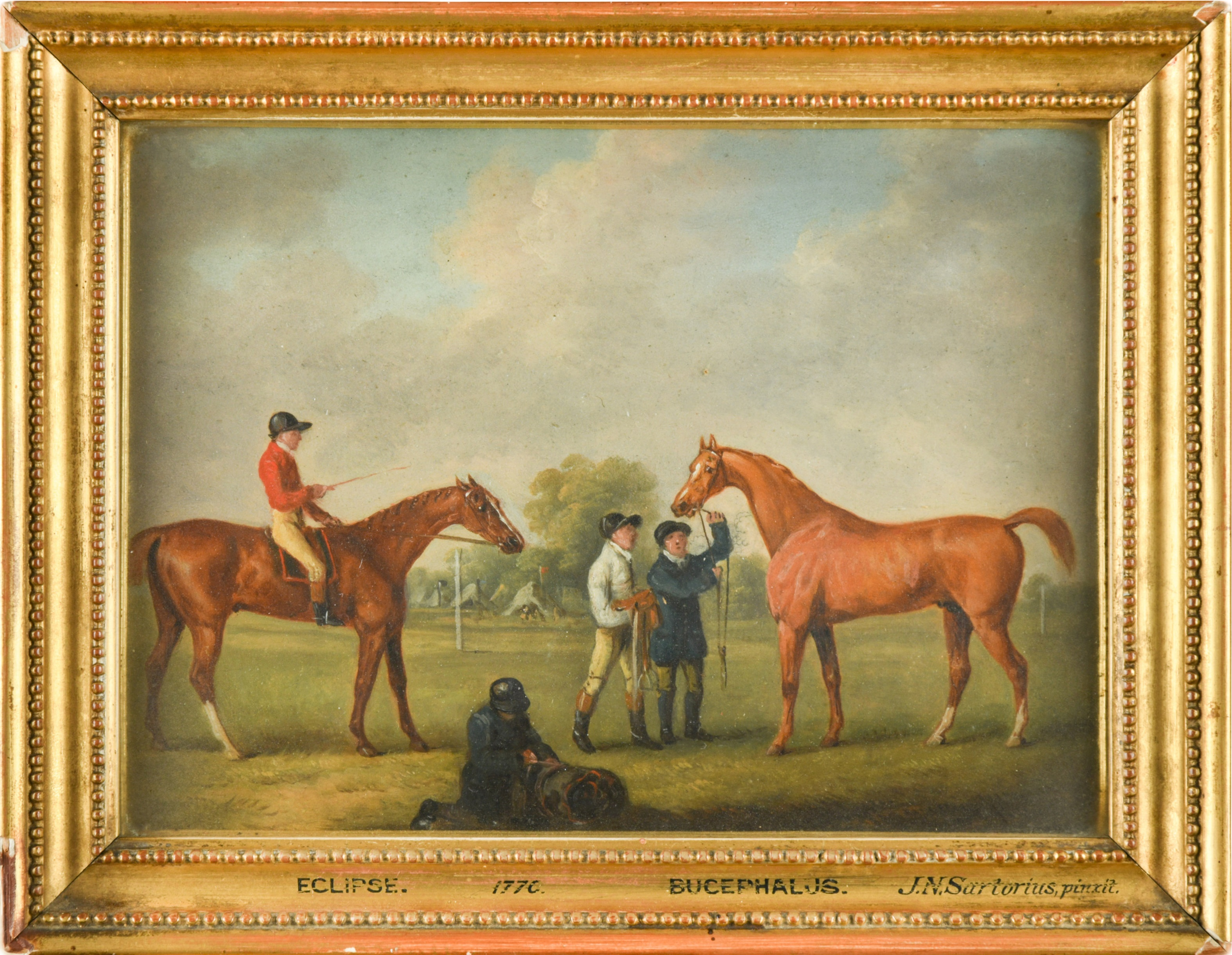
- Eclipse and Bucephalus, by J. N. Sartorius
- Sire: Regulus
- Grandsire: Godolphin Arabian
- Dam: Partner mare
- Damsire: Partner
- Sex: Stallion
- Foaled: 1764
- Country: Great Britain
- Colour: Chestnut
- Breeder: H. B. Osbaldeston
- Owner: H. B. Osbaldeston; Peregrine Wentworth; 1st Earl of Farnham

Major wins
- 5yo Great Subscription Purse (1769)
- Last updated on 2 November 2012

Bucephalus (foaled 1764) was a British Thoroughbred racehorse. He won the Subscription Purse at York in 1768, but is best known for racing against the undefeated Eclipse in a match race in 1770.

== Background ==
Bucephalus was a chestnut colt foaled in 1764 and bred by H. B. Osbaldeston. He was a son of the undefeated and multiple times Champion sire Regulus and a Partner mare. Bucephalus was a full brother to Sultan and Sultana, and a half-brother to Constantine.

== Racing career ==
Bucephalus made his racecourse debut at Beverley in May 1768 in the Ladies' Plate of £50, where he beat Conjuror to win. He was then purchased by Peregrine Wentworth and started as the 1/2 favourite for the Subscription Purse of £361 10s at York. Ridden by Leonard Jewison, he won easily; beating Leith, Rambler and Baber. A few days later he easily beat All-fours over four miles to win 500 guineas. At Newmarket in April 1770 Bucephalus was beaten for the first time, losing a match race to the undefeated Eclipse. It was said that the race was Eclipse's hardest race, but the effort left Bucephalus unfit to run for the rest of the year. After the defeat he was sold to the 1st Earl of Farnham. He ran several more times at Newmarket for the Earl of Farnham, but didn't win any races and was sold back to H. B. Osbaldeston in March 1773. Bucephalus won the four-mile Annual Prize, before being retired from racing.

== Stud career ==
Bucephalus met with some success as a sire. His progeny included Junior, also owned by H. B. Osbaldeston.

== Pedigree ==
Pedigree of Bucephalus, chestnut stallion, 1764
Sire Regulus (GB) 1739	Godolphin Arabian c.1700	(unknown)	(unknown)
Sire Regulus (GB) 1739	Godolphin Arabian c.1700	(unknown)	(unknown)
Sire Regulus (GB) 1739	Godolphin Arabian c.1700	(unknown)	(unknown)
Sire Regulus (GB) 1739	Godolphin Arabian c.1700	(unknown)	(unknown)
Sire Regulus (GB) 1739	Grey Robinson	Bald Galloway	St. Victor's Barb
Sire Regulus (GB) 1739	Grey Robinson	Bald Galloway	Grey Whynot
Sire Regulus (GB) 1739	Grey Robinson	Sister to Old Country Wench	Snake
Sire Regulus (GB) 1739	Grey Robinson	Sister to Old Country Wench	Grey Wilkes
Dam Partner mare	Partner; 1718	Jigg	Byerley Turk
Dam Partner mare	Partner; 1718	Jigg	Charming Jenny
Dam Partner mare	Partner; 1718	Sister to Mixbury	Curwen's Bay Barb
Dam Partner mare	Partner; 1718	Sister to Mixbury	Spot mare
Dam Partner mare	Smiling Tom mare	Smiling Tom	Conyers Arabian
Dam Partner mare	Smiling Tom mare	Smiling Tom	Chillaby mare
Dam Partner mare	Smiling Tom mare	Almanzor mare	Almanzor
Dam Partner mare	Smiling Tom mare	Almanzor mare	(unknown)
