= Dennis O'Kelly =

Irish breeder of thoroughbred racehorses (1725–1787)

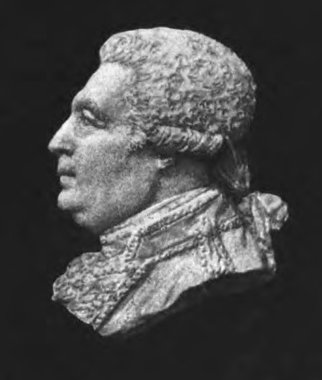
Cameo of Dennis O'Kelly, breeder and owner

Dennis O'Kelly (1725–1787), born in Connacht, Ireland, was a prominent 18th-century owner and breeder of thoroughbred racehorses. He owned Eclipse, the pre-eminent sire of the breed and ancestor of 95% of modern thoroughbreds, and from him bred horses including the Derby winners, Young Eclipse and Serjeant.

== Early years ==
Born to an impoverished Irish smallholder in 1725, O'Kelly moved to London as a young man, where he worked as a sedan chair carrier.

There he is reputed to have duped a wealthy heiress into marrying him, and absconded with her inheritance of £1,000; elsewhere this tale is dismissed as hearsay and the source of his initial wealth attributed to gambling. Either way, his money was soon frittered away on drink and gambling. This led in 1756 to a stay in the Fleet debtors' prison, where he met prostitute Charlotte Hayes. O'Kelly and Hayes formed a business, if not romantic, partnership which persisted for the rest of their lives. Both were freed in 1760 as part of George III's amnesty for those in debtor's jails.

O'Kelly plied his trade as a conman in London's coffee-houses and, through his gambling contacts, introduced clients to Hayes. It is reported that O'Kelly himself took in female clients. Within eight years, they had amassed a total of £40,000, enough to branch out into racehorse ownership. They also came to own a significant property portfolio, including Clay Hill estate outside of Epsom, Canons Park, a substantial villa built by William Hallett Esq, and former estate of the Duke of Chandos in Stanmore, Middlesex also property in Piccadilly and Half Moon Street in London.

O'Kelly began to learn about horse racing and breeding from some of the visitors to Hayes' establishment. It was here, from one of Hayes' clients, that he heard about a stallion bred by the late Duke of Cumberland, named Eclipse, of whom he purchased a 1/8th share.

== Eclipse ==
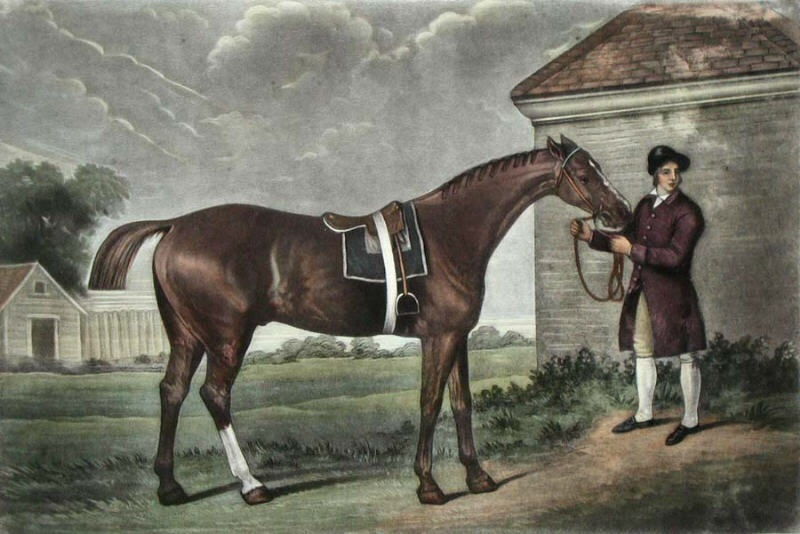
Eclipse At New Market With Groom by George Stubbs (1724 - 1806)

In 1769, his first season as a racehorse, the five-year-old Eclipse remained unbeaten in the nine races he contested. This inspired O'Kelly to buy the horse outright from his owner William Wildman for the sum of 1,100 guineas. In 1770, under O'Kelly's ownership, Eclipse remained unbeaten for another nine races and retired having won career prize money of £3,000.

Eclipse then went to stud for a fee of 50 guineas, the highest stud fee in the country, where he sired 930 colts and fillies over 17 years. Amongst the best of them were Young Eclipse and Serjeant, who enhanced Eclipse's stud reputation by winning early renewals of the Derby under O'Kelly's ownership. O'Kelly had narrowly missed out on winning the very first Derby with another son of Eclipse, Boudrow.

Success with horses brought O'Kelly wealth, but not social standing. The Jockey Club refused his membership, even after O'Kelly became a Captain and then Lieutenant-Colonel in the Middlesex Militia. Despite his social ascent, and obvious charisma, the evidence of his humble upbringing remained:

Mr O'Kelly, though he latterly was able to assume the sang froid in his manners and conversation, was perfectly illiterate; but being blessed with a good memory, and native drollery, he was seldom at a loss in conversation, and took part in every subject proposed - always pleasant, and never offensive; for though his voice was coarse, his address was complaisant

— Anon., Sketch of the Life and Character of Dennis O'Kelly, Esq., The Edinburgh Magazine (1788)

== Death ==
O'Kelly died of gout in 1787. He died "at about his sixty-seventh year of age", which would cast doubt on the accuracy of his birth date. His will stated that all his racehorses should be sold off and that his brother Philip and nephew Andrew should forfeit £500 of their inheritance if they retained any involvement in racehorses. It is said he was:

... charitable without ostentation, and prosperity did not inflate him with pride; for he called his relations from obscurity and penury, supported them in ease and plenty, and at his death left them independent.

— Anon., Sketch of the Life and Character of Dennis O'Kelly, Esq., The Edinburgh Magazine (1788)

== Bibliography ==
- Linnane, Fergus (2003). London, the Wicked City. Robson Books.
- Rubenhold, Hallie (2005) The Covent Garden Ladies. Stroud: Tempus ISBN 9780752428505
- "Sketch of the Life and Character of Dennis O'Kelly, Esq". The Edinburgh Magazine, or Literary Miscellany. VII: 105–106. February 1788.
