= Ninety-three (horse) =

British Thoroughbred racehorse

- Sire: Florizel
- Grandsire: Herod
- Dam: Nosegay
- Damsire: Justice
- Sex: Stallion
- Foaled: 1790
- Country: Kingdom of Great Britain
- Colour: Chestnut
- Breeder: John Clifton
- Owner: Thomas Vernon; John Hutchinson; John Clifton
- Record: 6: 1-1-2

Major wins
- St Leger Stakes (1793)

Ninety-three (foaled 1790) was a British Thoroughbred racehorse best known for winning the classic St Leger Stakes in 1793. He was one of the least successful of classic winners, with the St Leger being his only victory in a six race career which lasted from May 1793 until September 1794. After his retirement from racing he does not appear to have been used as a breeding stallion. His name has also been rendered as Ninety three, Ninety Three and Ninety-Three.

== Background ==
Ninety-three was a chestnut horse bred by John Clifton. He was sired by Florizel, a successful racehorse whose other offspring included The Derby winners Diomed and Eager, as well as the St Leger winner Tartar. Ninety-three was the third of twelve foals produced by his dam Nosegay, a mare bred by the Duke of Cumberland. Before he appeared for his first race, the colt appears to have been sold to Thomas Vernon and then sold again to John Hutchinson.

== Racing career ==
=== 1793: three-year-old season ===
Mr. Hutchinson's ch c. Ninety three, by Florizel, bought of Mr. Vernon made his first appearance on 30 May at York Racecourse. In a one and a half mile sweepstakes he finished fourth of the seven runners behind a filly named Hornet. During the summer of 1793 the colt was bought back by his breeder and reappeared at Doncaster Racecourse in autumn in Clifton's colours. On 24 September he was one of eight three-year-olds to contest the St Leger, and started a 15/1 outsider. Ridden by William Peirse, he won the classic by outpacing Foreigner, with the 2/1 favourite Hornet in third place. On the following afternoon he ran in the weight-for-age Gold Cup over four miles and finished third of the seven runners behind Hutchinson's colt Oberon.

=== 1794: four-year-old season ===
Ninety-three failed to win in three races as a four-year-old in 1794, although he finished first in two preliminary heats. He made his first appearance of the season on 9 July at Nantwich when he raced in a sweepstakes run in a series of three-mile heats, with the prize going to the first horse to win twice. He defeated his only opponent a six-year-old named Tommy in the first heat, but was beaten in the next two. In this race he was incorrectly described by the Racing Calendar as being a brown colt. At Preston, two weeks later (described as a bay) he contested another race in heats for a prize donated by the Earl of Derby. He finished second, first and third before finishing third again in the deciding heat. In September, he returned to the scene of his St Leger victory for a second attempt at Doncaster's Gold Cup. He finished fourth of the seven runners behind the 1794 St Leger winner Beningbrough.

== Stud career ==
Ninety-three never appeared on the lists of stallions whose services were advertised in the Racing Calendar, and he has no offspring listed in the General Stud Book. He may have died of natural causes or been euthanised after his final race, although it is possible that he was gelded and used as a hack or hunter.

== Pedigree ==
Pedigree of Ninety-three (GB), chestnut colt, 1790
Sire Florizel (GB) 1768	Herod*; 1758	Tartar*	Partner
Sire Florizel (GB) 1768	Herod*; 1758	Tartar*	Meliora
Sire Florizel (GB) 1768	Herod*; 1758	Cypron*	Blaze
Sire Florizel (GB) 1768	Herod*; 1758	Cypron*	Salome
Sire Florizel (GB) 1768	Cygnet mare 1761	Cygnet	Godolphin Arabian
Sire Florizel (GB) 1768	Cygnet mare 1761	Cygnet	Godolphin Blossom
Sire Florizel (GB) 1768	Cygnet mare 1761	Young Cartouch mare	Young Cartouch
Sire Florizel (GB) 1768	Cygnet mare 1761	Young Cartouch mare	Ebony
Dam Nosegay (GB) 1780	Justice; 1774	Herod*	Tartar*
Dam Nosegay (GB) 1780	Justice; 1774	Herod*	Cypron*
Dam Nosegay (GB) 1780	Justice; 1774	Curiosity	Snap*
Dam Nosegay (GB) 1780	Justice; 1774	Curiosity	Regulus mare
Dam Nosegay (GB) 1780	Nosegay; 1767	Snap*	Snip
Dam Nosegay (GB) 1780	Nosegay; 1767	Snap*	sister to Slipby
Dam Nosegay (GB) 1780	Nosegay; 1767	Flora	Young Cade
Dam Nosegay (GB) 1780	Nosegay; 1767	Flora	Midge (Family:3)

* Ninety-three is inbred 2S x 3D to the stallion Herod, meaning that he appears second generation on the sire side of his pedigree and third generation on the dam side of his pedigree.

* Ninety-three is inbred 4D x 3D to the stallion Snap, meaning that he appears fourth and third generation once each dam side of his pedigree.
