= Young Eclipse =

British Thoroughbred racehorse

- Sire: Eclipse
- Grandsire: Marske
- Dam: Juno
- Damsire: Spectator
- Sex: Stallion
- Foaled: 1778
- Died: c. 1803
- Country: Kingdom of Great Britain
- Colour: Bay
- Breeder: Dennis O'Kelly
- Owner: Dennis O'Kelly
- Trainer: Not recorded
- Record: 13:7-1-2 (incomplete)

Major wins
- Epsom Derby (1781)

Young Eclipse (1778 –c. 1803) was a Thoroughbred racehorse that won the 1781 Epsom Derby. He raced until he was six years old, winning seven races and retiring to stud in 1785. He was not a successful sire.

== Background ==
Young Eclipse was foaled in 1778 and was bred by Dennis O'Kelly, who owned his sire Eclipse and stood him at his Clay Hill Stud farm near Epsom for a 50-guinea per mare stud fee. O'Kelly was an Irish immigrant who had made his fortune through professional gambling, Eclipse's stud fees and the profits of a brothel run by his lover Charlotte Hayes. Eclipse was undefeated during his racing career, winning 18 races, and is the foundation sire from which most modern Thoroughbreds descend. Young Eclipse's dam, Juno (foaled in 1764), was bred by the Duke of Ancaster and produced nine foals between 1772 and her death in 1793. Young Eclipse was her sixth and most notable foal.

Young Eclipse was considered "fleeter" than his sire at distances less than three miles and reportedly was ill-tempered and "what the jockeys call rusty."

== Racing career ==
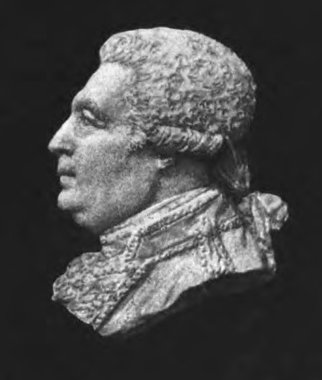
Cameo of Dennis O'Kelly, Young Eclipse's breeder and owner

Young Eclipse was trained "privately" at Epsom and the name of his trainer was not recorded. Young Eclipse won seven races during his career and raced mostly at Newmarket. His most important win was in the 1781 Derby. He retired to stud in 1785 after he injured a fetlock during his last race.

=== 1781: three-year-old season ===
The second Derby Stakes was run on 24 May 1781 with a field of thirteen horses. The betting favorite was John Lade's colt Crop at odds of 5 to 4 with odds on Young Eclipse at 10 to 1. Young Eclipse won the race, with Crop finishing second and Prince of Orange third. On 31 May at Epsom, he lost two £50 two-mile heats to the colt Laburnum. At the October Meeting at Newmarket, Young Eclipse received an unspecified forfeiture from a filly sired by Sweetwilliam.

=== 1782: four-year-old season ===
Young Eclipse won a match race against the horse Blush at Newmarket. Young Eclipse did not place in the Claret Stakes, the race being won by the colt Crop and the second-place finisher Regent receiving "two hogsheads of claret" from Crop's owner. On 20 June, Young Eclipse was fourth in a sweepstakes race which was won by the colt Arske. He received 50-guineas forfeiture from the colt Fox at Epsom and a 100-guinea forfeiture from Orando at Newmarket in October. Young Eclipse was third in a 60-guinea Purse race, losing to the filly Dido and the colt Flamer.

=== 1783: five-year-old season ===
At the First Spring Meeting in Newmarket, Young Eclipse beat the horses Alric and Crop for a 100-guinea sweepstakes race. In July, he again beat Crop in a 500-guinea race and received a 60-guinea forfeiture from the colt Skinflint. At Burford, Young Eclipse won the King's Plate on 19 August. At Lichfield, Young Eclipse lost the Ladies' Purse to the colt Petrarch who won three heats in the race after Young Eclipse won the first heat.

=== 1784: six-year-old season ===
Young Eclipse was third in a £50 race at the First Spring Meeting in Newmarket to the colts Mercury and Signor. In Newmarket during the Second Spring Meeting, Young Eclipse won a match race against the colt Imperator and won a £50 race by winning two-mile heats against Lord Grosvenor horse Flamer. He received 150 guineas forfeit from the colt Assassin (the 1782 Derby winner) in July and walked over for the 100-guinea King's Purse on 3 August at Nottingham. Young Eclipse's last turf appearance occurred in York for the August Meeting where he "broke down" while running for the King's Purse against the horses Recovery and Monk. He had dislocated one of his fetlock joints and was permanently retired from racing.

== Stud career ==
Young Eclipse was retired to stud after his racing career. By 1796, he was listed as a stallion at Colney Chapel, 3 miles from St. Albans, for a fee of 20 guineas per mare and a one guinea groom fee. He was advertised in the stallion register in 1803, but was not mentioned in the 1804 edition. Young Eclipse is not considered to be a successful sire.

Young Eclipse sired a colt, also named Young Eclipse, that was foaled in 1799 out of a Highflyer mare and was owned by a Mr. Wilson. This Young Eclipse was second in the 1802 Epsom Derby to the colt Tyrant and was considered "the best horse of his year." He is often confused with his sire.

== Pedigree ==
Pedigree of Young Eclipse (GB), Bay Colt, 1778
Sire Eclipse (GB) Chestnut, 1764	Marske; 1750	Squirt	Bartlett's Childers
Sire Eclipse (GB) Chestnut, 1764	Marske; 1750	Squirt	Sister to Old Country Wench
Sire Eclipse (GB) Chestnut, 1764	Marske; 1750	The Ruby Mare	Huttons Blacklegs
Sire Eclipse (GB) Chestnut, 1764	Marske; 1750	The Ruby Mare	Bay Bolton Mare
Sire Eclipse (GB) Chestnut, 1764	Spilletta; 1749	Regulus	Godolphin Arabian*
Sire Eclipse (GB) Chestnut, 1764	Spilletta; 1749	Regulus	Grey Robinson
Sire Eclipse (GB) Chestnut, 1764	Spilletta; 1749	Mother Western	Easby Snake
Sire Eclipse (GB) Chestnut, 1764	Spilletta; 1749	Mother Western	Old Montagu Mare
Dam Juno Bay, 1764	Spectator; 1749	Crab	Alcock's Arabian
Dam Juno Bay, 1764	Spectator; 1749	Crab	Sister to Soreheels
Dam Juno Bay, 1764	Spectator; 1749	Partner Mare	Partner
Dam Juno Bay, 1764	Spectator; 1749	Partner Mare	Bonny Lass
Dam Juno Bay, 1764	Horatia; 1758	Blank	Godolphin Arabian*
Dam Juno Bay, 1764	Horatia; 1758	Blank	Amorett
Dam Juno Bay, 1764	Horatia; 1758	Sister One to Steady	Flying Childers
Dam Juno Bay, 1764	Horatia; 1758	Sister One to Steady	Miss Belvoir

* Young Eclipse is inbred 4S × 4D to the stallion Godolphin Arabian, meaning that he appears fourth generation on the sire side of his pedigree and fourth generation on the dam side of his pedigree.
