= Spread Eagle (horse) =

British Thoroughbred racehorse

- Sire: Volunteer
- Grandsire: Eclipse
- Dam: Highflyer Mare
- Damsire: Highflyer
- Sex: Stallion
- Foaled: 1792
- Country: Great Britain
- Colour: Bay
- Breeder: Sir Francis Standish
- Owner: 1) Sir Francis Standish; 2) James Hoomes
- Trainer: Richard Prince
- Record: 5 wins

Major wins
- Prince's Stakes (1795); Epsom Derby (1795); King's Plate (1798)

Spread Eagle (1792–1805) was a British Thoroughbred racehorse that won the 1795 Epsom Derby and was later imported into the United States to factor into the pedigrees of early American racehorses.

== Pedigree and racing career ==
Spread Eagle was sired by Volunteer out of an unnamed mare by Highflyer in 1792. His dam also produced Eagle (also later imported to the US) and the 1796 Derby winner Didelot. He was named after an inn at Epsom that was frequented by racing officials during the week of the Derby. First raced at age three, Spread Eagle won 100 guinea race at Newmarket in 1795, followed by wins in the Prince's Stakes (second class) and the Epsom Derby. Illness in the later part of 1795 prevented him racing until 1796. In 1796 he won one race, a 100-guinea stakes race at York and won the King's Plate as a six-year-old in 1798. He was retired to stud in 1798 and stood briefly in Newmarket for a fee of 12 guineas per mare before being exported.

== Exportation and stud career ==
Spread Eagle was exported in August 1798 to the United States by James Hoomes and was used as a breeding stallion in Virginia. Spread Eagle died in 1805 at the age of thirteen years in Kentucky. His most notable offspring was Maid of the Oaks, a chestnut mare foaled in Virginia in 1801, that is the ancestress of the female line of Commando and subsequently is present in the pedigrees of some modern racehorses.
