= Planet (horse) =

American racehorse

Planet (1855–1875) was a racehorse and U.S. Racing Hall of Fame inductee who, after Lexington, was considered the best horse before the American Civil War. He set a record for prize money earnings which stood for 20 years. (He earned $1,915,334.25 adjusted by inflation.)

== Appearance ==
Turf writer John Hervey described him as "a rich chestnut, 15.2½ (hands) tall, he was remarkable for his symmetry of mould and the excellence of his limbs" As well as that this majestic look was also implied by his nickname, The Great Red Fox.

== Racing career ==
In his career, Planet showed his durability and versatility by winning in multiple eastern states including Virginia, Georgia, South Carolina, Alabama, Louisiana, and New York. He won 24 of 28 races although many sources claim he won 27 of 31. Regardless it is generally accepted he lost only 4 races and won at distances ranging from 1 mile all the way to 4 miles which he was said to prefer. These wins were done in heat races where he would have to run up to 12 miles in one day to be declared the winner of a single race.

One of his unique skills was also the ability to naturally trot. It was said he was able to trot 1 mile in 3 minutes. While he never competed in a trotting race he sired a mare named Dame Winnie who was then bred to Standardbreds in Palo Alto by Leland Stanford. In 1861 his career was cut short by the battle of Fort Sumter which would then affect his stud career.

== Stud career ==
Most of his time as a stud was adversely affected because of the American Civil War. Sires had to be hidden in the woods in order for them to be safe. In 1868 he was sold to Robert A. Alexander of Woodburn Farm in Woodford County, Kentucky. He spent the rest of his life there before his death at age 20.

Planet was inducted into the National Museum of Racing and Hall of Fame in 2012.
