= Thomas Boxall =

English cricketer

Thomas Boxall (dates unknown) was a famous English cricketer of the late 18th century. He was a very successful right arm bowler, believed to have been fast underarm. (Note: Any match listed in the ACS' Important Match Guide (1981) is historically important, and therefore of the highest standard, whether or not a scorecard might exist. The same applies to numerous matches discovered by researchers since 1981. For further information, see First-class cricket.)

== Career ==
According to Scores and Biographies, Boxall was about 5 ft 5in tall, strong and muscular. He may have been born at Ripley, Surrey but this is uncertain, especially as he played mainly for Kent. He was employed for a long time by the Kent patron Stephen Amherst. Amherst constructed an indoor practice area in a barn so that Boxall could bowl to him during the winter. The Walker brothers of Hambledon also did this at their farm.

Thomas Boxall made his known debut in the 1789 season, and made 89 known appearances in historically important matches from then until 1803.

Near the end of his career, in 1801, Boxall published the earliest known instructional book on cricket called Rules and Instructions for Playing at the Game of Cricket.

== Bibliography ==
- ACS (1981). A Guide to Important Cricket Matches Played in the British Isles 1709–1863. Nottingham: ACS. OCLC 85045528.
- Bowen, Rowland (1970). Cricket: A History of its Growth and Development. London: Eyre & Spottiswoode. ISBN 978-04-13278-60-9.
- Haygarth, Arthur (1996) [1862]. Scores & Biographies, Volume 1 (1744–1826). Kennington: Frederick Lillywhite. ISBN 978-19-00592-23-9.
