= 1789 English cricket season =

Cricket season review

The 1789 English cricket season was played against the backdrop of the French Revolution, which escalated after the Storming of the Bastille on 14 July when cricket patron John Frederick Sackville, 3rd Duke of Dorset, was the British ambassador in Paris. Details of 25 matches are known, but few were historically important. (Note: Any match listed in the ACS' Important Match Guide (1981) is historically important, and therefore of the highest standard, whether or not a scorecard might exist. The same applies to numerous matches discovered by researchers since 1981. For further information, see First-class cricket.)

== Proposed visit to Paris ==
A story has circulated that the British ambassador to France, the Duke of Dorset, a leading patron of cricket, planned the formation of an England team to visit Paris on a goodwill tour, and play matches there in August. The tale goes that this team, having assembled in London, had travelled to Dover on 10 August where, unexpectedly, they met the Duke himself coming the other way. He was returning to England following the escalation of the French Revolution.

As John Major said in More Than A Game, 'the whole story is nonsense'. On 16 July, two days after the Storming of the Bastille, Dorset had written to Foreign Secretary Francis Osborne, 5th Duke of Leeds, about the crisis, and had warned other British residents to leave Paris, so he would hardly have invited a cricket team to come to France at such a time. Dorset himself is known to have left Paris on 8 August. He did not return, and was temporarily replaced by his Embassy Secretary, Lord Robert Stephen FitzGerald, as Minister Plenipotentiary. New credentials were delivered by his official successor, Earl Gower, on 20 June 1790. Dorset's credentials were terminated on 29 June 1790.

== Kent v Surrey ==
Kent hosted Surrey between 10 and 12 June on Moulsey Hurst, with a return played 11 to 14 August at Bishopsbourne Paddock. In both matches, the visitors won: Kent by 3 wickets in June, and Surrey by 9 wickets in August.

== Hampshire v Kent ==
Kent also played two matches against Hampshire. The first of these was on Windmill Down through 13 and 14 July. Kent won by 56 runs. While this match was in progress on Tuesday, 14 July, the Storming of the Bastille occurred in Paris. Robert Clifford and William Bullen played key roles in Kent's victory. They made the top scores of 27 and 20 in Kent's first innings of 98, and then took seven wickets each (bowled only) to dismiss Hampshire for 49 and 27.

The return was played at Bishopsbourne Paddock from 18 to 21 August, and Hampshire won by 29 runs.

== England matches ==
There were two matches involving England, who played Kent in July and Hampshire in September. The match against Kent took place on the New Ground, Uxbridge Moor between 23 and 25 July. England's team included the young Billy Beldham, who made the game's top score of 48, which helped them to win by an innings and 10 runs.

The return match was on Sevenoaks Vine from 2 to 5 September. This was the final match in the career of the great Lumpy Stevens. Hampshire won by 15 runs.

== Single wicket ==
Six of Hambledon played against Six of Kent between 9 and 10 July on Itchin Stoke Down. The match was drawn because of bad weather.

== Other events ==
On 25 May, a "gentlemen only" England team played Middlesex at Lord's Old Ground (Lord's). Middlesex, including ten professionals, won by an innings and 64 runs.

By this time, George Finch, 9th Earl of Winchilsea had become one of the sport's most influential patrons. In June, he formed his own team for a match at Lord's against Sir Horatio Mann's XI. Winchilsea's XI won by 140 runs.

At the end of the season, Leicester and Nottingham played two matches in Loughborough. Nottingham won the first by an innings and 16 runs; Leicester won the second by a single run.

== Bibliography ==
- ACS (1981). A Guide to Important Cricket Matches Played in the British Isles 1709–1863. Nottingham: ACS. OCLC 85045528.
- Haygarth, Arthur (1996) [1862]. Scores & Biographies, Volume 1 (1744–1826). Kennington: Frederick Lillywhite. ISBN 978-19-00592-23-9.
- Major, John (2007). More Than A Game. London: HarperCollins. ISBN 978-00-07183-64-7 – via Internet Archive.
- Waghorn, H. T. (2005) [1906]. The Dawn of Cricket. London: J. W. McKenzie. ISBN 978-09-47821-17-3.
