= Regulus (horse) =

British Thoroughbred racehorse

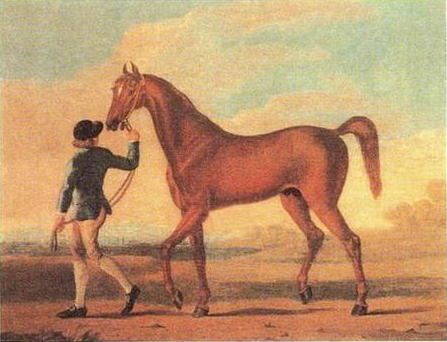
- Regulus
- Sire: Godolphin Arabian
- Dam: Grey Robinson
- Damsire: Bald Galloway
- Sex: Stallion
- Foaled: 1739
- Died: c. 1766
- Country: Great Britain
- Colour: Chestnut
- Breeder: Lord Chedworth
- Owner: Mr. Martindale
- Record: 9: 9–0–0

Awards
- Leading sire in Great Britain and Ireland (1754–1757, 1761, 1763, 1765, 1766)
- Last updated on August 22, 2007

Regulus (1739–c. 1766) was an undefeated British Thoroughbred racehorse who won eight Royal Plates in 1745.

== Background ==
He was bred in England by Lord Chedworth.

Regulus was by the Godolphin Arabian, his dam, the noted Grey Robinson, by Bald Galloway and out of Sister To Old Country Wench (dam of Squirt ) by Snake, out of Old Grey Wilkes, a daughter of Old Hautboy.

After the death of Lord Chedworth, Regulus was sold to Mr. Martindale as a maiden.

== Racing career ==
Regulus was a successful racehorse, winning eight Royal Plates in 1745 and a £50 plate.

Regulus was superior to any horse of his time and retired unbeaten to stud in the north of England.

== Stud record ==
Regulus proved to be an excellent sire. At stud, he sired Royal (1749), South (1750), Fearnought (1755), undefeated Alipes, Star, Cato, Juba, Ascha, Grisewood's Lady Thigh, Miss Belsea, and many successful broodmares including Spilletta who is the dam of the undefeated champion Eclipse. Regulus also sired the second dam of Highflyer.

His offspring's successes led him to be the Leading sire in Great Britain & Ireland for eight years (1754–1757, 1761, 1763, 1765, and 1766).

He died at age 26.

== Sire line tree ==
- Regulus
  - Brutus
    - Babraham
    - Adolphus
    - Havannah
    - Noble
    - Partner
  - Cato
  - Royal
  - Adolphus
  - Silvereye
  - South
    - Confederate
    - Friar
    - South West
    - South East
    - Magog
    - Cormorant
    - Amazon
    - Laycock
    - Flimnap
  - Careless
    - Regulator
    - Mousetrap
    - Alderman
  - Jolly Roger
  - Fearnought
    - Regulus
    - King Herod
    - Fearnought
    - Eclipse
    - Goldfinder
      - Flag of Truce
        - Leviathan
    - Independence
    - Matchless
    - Wildair
      - Highflier
      - Commutation
      - Chanticleer
    - Whynot
  - Dragon
  - Vampire
  - Jalap
    - Achilles
  - Ascham
  - Star
  - Prophet
    - Soothsayer
    - Goldsmith
    - Trifle
  - Doge
    - Venetian
      - Maryland Phoenix
    - Young Sir Peter
  - Morwick Ball
    - Icelander
    - Young Morwick
      - Gustavus
      - Curanto
    - Parlington
    - Doctor Nim
    - No-no
    - Pellegrine
  - Turk
  - Bucephalus

== See also ==
- List of leading Thoroughbred racehorses
