= Hollandoise =

British Thoroughbred racehorse

- Sire: Matchem
- Grandsire: Cade
- Dam: Virago
- Damsire: Panton's Arabian
- Sex: Mare
- Foaled: 1775
- Country: Kingdom of Great Britain
- Colour: Grey
- Breeder: Thomas Stapleton
- Owner: Thomas Stapleton and Sir Thomas Gascoigne
- Trainer: Joseph Rose
- Record: 14 starts, eight wins

Major wins
- St. Leger Stakes (1778)

Hollandoise, or alternatively Hollandaise, (1775–1782) was a grey British Thoroughbred mare that won the 1778 St. Leger Stakes, the first horse to win the event under its formal title. Raced sporadically from 1778 to 1782, Hollandoise won eight races in 14 starts. She died suddenly shortly after her last race in 1782 before producing any offspring.

== Background ==
Hollandoise was foaled in 1775 at the farm of her breeder, Thomas Stapleton, at Carleton near Snaith, Yorkshire. She was sired by the Thoroughbred foundation stallion Matchem, the principal progenitor of the Godolphin Arabian sire line and a sire known for "gameness and soundness." Virago was a daughter of the Panton Grey Arabian, an imported stallion owned by the jockey Thomas Panton that stood at Newmarket. Virago was a successful racehorse in the 1760s that won races over long distances, including multiple King's Plates, before she was retired to Stapleton and Gascoigne's stud. Virago produced nine foals from 1769 to 1779, with Hollandoise being her fifth foal. In addition to Hollandoise, Virago produced her grey full-brother Tarare and half-sister Gunilda. Gunilda (called Virago in the United States) produced the successful American racemare Virago (sired by Shark) and is the maternal ancestor of Kentucky Derby winner Spokane.

Hollandoise was jointly owned by Thomas Stapleton and Sir Thomas Gascoigne during her racing career. Reported to be Stapleton's "favorite mare", no portrait of Hollandoise was commissioned by Stapleton due to her sudden death in 1782.

== Racing career ==
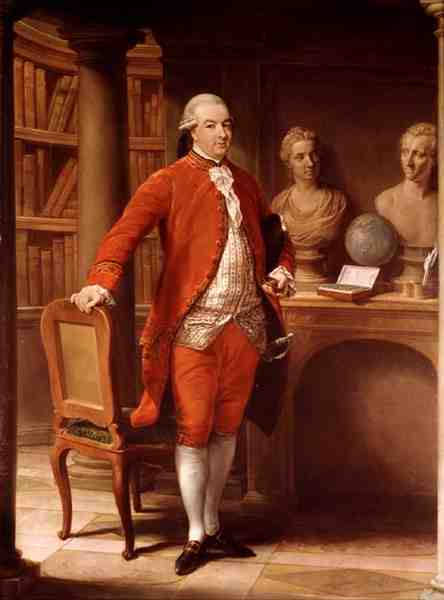
Sir Thomas Gascoigne owned Hollandoise in partnership with Thomas Stapleton.

=== St. Leger ===
Unraced as a two-year-old, Hollandoise's first start was for the St. Leger Stakes. A two-mile stakes race with terms identical to the St. Leger had been run at Doncaster in September since 1776, but the race was not formally called the St. Leger until the 1778 running on 22 September. Bets were laid 5-2 against Hollandoise with the favorite being a colt sired by Wildair owned by Sir John L. Kaye. Ridden by George Herring, she beat seven horses, the Wildair colt second, in what was deemed an "easy" race.

=== Later career ===
Hollandoise did not race during the 1779 season and ran only once in 1780, winning a 500-guinea match race against Mr. Douglas's colt Sting. At the Newmarket Spring meeting in April 1781, Hollandoise was beaten by Dictator for a 200-guinea sweepstakes race. Shortly after the loss, she was sold to Lord Clermont at the Second Spring meeting at Newmarket. Racing again at Swaffham on 25 September 1781, Hollandoise won a 50-guinea subscription race against Mr. Fox's horse Rodney and the following day won a match race against Epsom for £50. However, the purse was split between Lord Clermont and Epsom's owner Mr. Hull to resolve a dispute that arose over the validity of Hollandoise's weight allowance. In October 1781, Hollandoise lost a subscription race to Woodpecker in the final race of his career. At Newmarket, Hollandoise won a 140-guinea and 70-guinea Purse race in her final starts of the season.

In 1782 at the Craven meeting, she lost the Craven Stakes to the future foundation sire and multiple stakes winner Pot-8-Os and lost a subscription race to Buccaneer. At Newmarket, she beat Standby to win the King's Stakes and lost again to Pot-8-Os in a 25-guinea subscription race. A few weeks later at Newmarket she won a £50 race beating Anvil and Aske. Lord Clermont received 85 guineas from Mr. Wentworth when his horse Fearnought backed out of a match race. Hollandoise died shortly after the Second Spring Newmarket meeting in May or June 1782 of an unspecified illness. A correspondent from Sporting Magazine wrote years after her death that the horse was "allowed to be as good a mare as any that ever ran in England."

== Pedigree ==
Pedigree of Hollandoise (GB), Grey Mare, 1775
Sire Matchem	Cade	Godolphin Arabian	Unknown
Sire Matchem	Cade	Godolphin Arabian	Unknown
Sire Matchem	Cade	Roxana	Bald Galloway
Sire Matchem	Cade	Roxana	Sister to Chaunter
Sire Matchem	Sister to Miss Partner	Partner	Jigg
Sire Matchem	Sister to Miss Partner	Partner	Sister 1 to Mixbury
Sire Matchem	Sister to Miss Partner	Brown Farewell	Makeless
Sire Matchem	Sister to Miss Partner	Brown Farewell	Brimmer mare
Dam Virago	Panton's Grey Arabian	Unknown	Unknown
Dam Virago	Panton's Grey Arabian	Unknown	Unknown
Dam Virago	Panton's Grey Arabian	Unknown	Unknown
Dam Virago	Panton's Grey Arabian	Unknown	Unknown
Dam Virago	Crazy	Lath	Godolphin Arabian
Dam Virago	Crazy	Lath	Roxana
Dam Virago	Crazy	Bay Basto	Flying Childers
Dam Virago	Crazy	Bay Basto	Sister to Soreheels (Family 9-a)

- Cade and Lath were full-brothers, causing Hollandoise to be inbred 3x4 to both the Godolphin Arabian and Roxana.
