= John Cade (jockey) =

British jockey

Personal information
- Born: 1751 Melbourne, East Riding of Yorkshire, England
- Died: 6 January 1826 (aged 74–75) Kingston upon Hull, East Riding of Yorkshire, England
- Occupation: Jockey

Horse racing career
- Sport: Horse racing

Major racing wins
- Major races St Leger (1777)

Significant horses
- Bourbon

John Cade (1751–1826), known as "Jockey John" was a British jockey, winner of the 1777 St Leger on Bourbon.

He was born in Melbourne, near Pocklington, East Riding of Yorkshire in 1751, one of several jockeys of the era from that village. He received his tutelage at the stable of John Hutchinson and eventually took over from Leonard Jewison as the rider for owner Peregrine Wentworth.

Aside from his St Leger win, little else is known about the victories of his racing career. His last ride came on 20 August 1796 and he died in Kingston upon Hull on 6 January 1826. His obituary in the Sporting Magazine noted that "no person was better respected than poor Cade, being equally distinguished for a kind disposition, and a quiet, inoffensive deportment."

His son, Henry, became an apprentice jockey.

== Major wins ==
(United Kingdom) Great Britain

- St Leger - Bourbon (1777)
