= 1778 in sports =

1778 in sports describes the year's events in world sport.

== Boxing ==
Events

- June — Harry Sellers defeated Bill " The Nailer " Stevens in a 10-minute fight to retain the English Championship title.

== Cricket ==
Events

- Thomas Brett, the first great Hambledon bowler, retired from cricket.

England

- Most runs – William Yalden 162
- Most wickets – Lamborn 22

== Horse racing ==
England

- St Leger Stakes – Hollandoise
