= Phaéton (trotter horse) =

French trotter horse

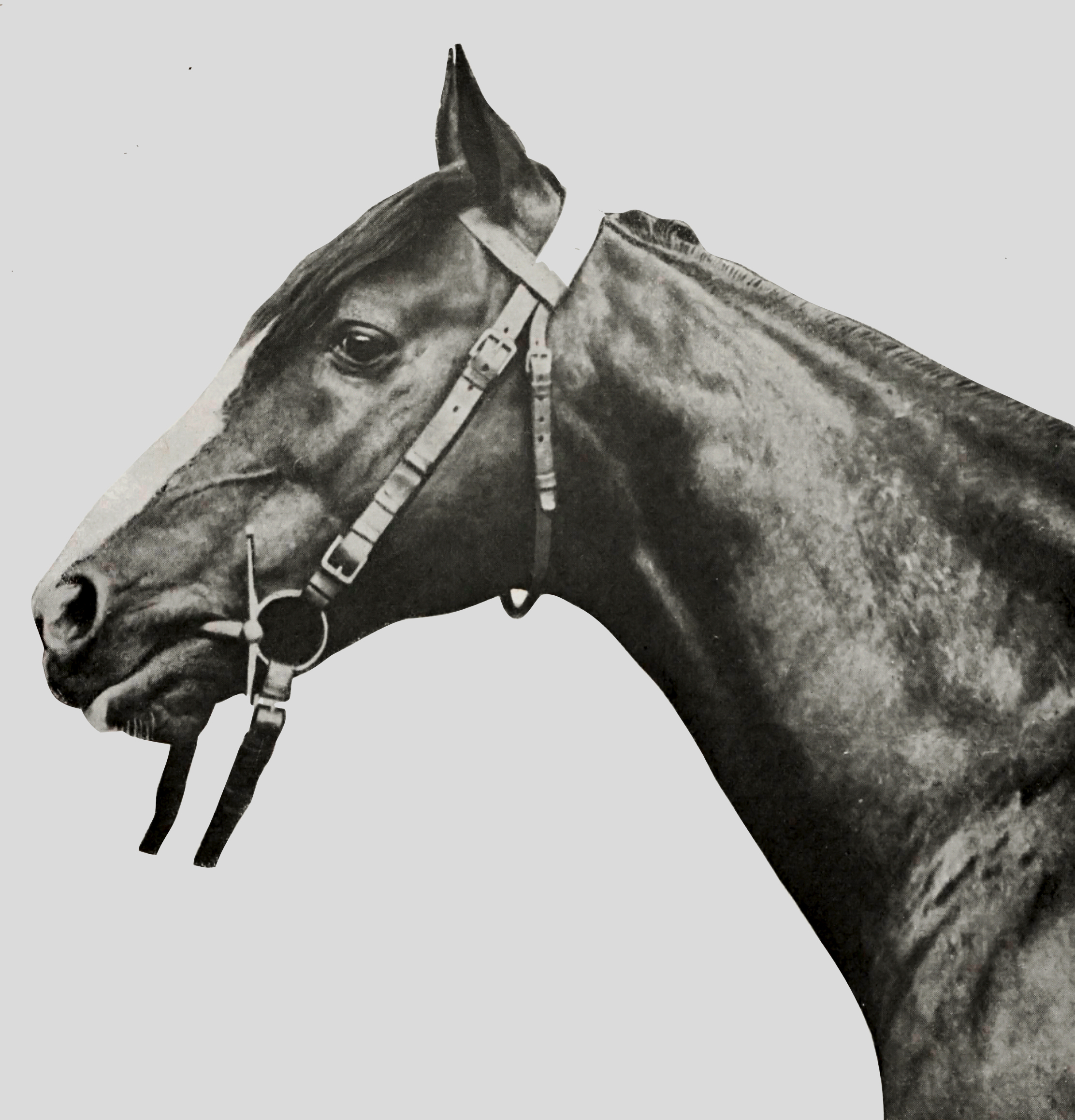
- Breed: Anglo-Norman horse
- Sire: The Heir of Linne
- Dam: La Crocus
- Sex: Male
- Foaled: Suzon, Clémentine, Gambade, Fauvette II, Harley, James Watt, Ergoline, Narcisse, Héloïse, and Eva; Saint-André-de-Bohon
- Died: 1896
- Color: Chesnut

Phaéton (or Phaëton, born 1871, died 1896) was an Anglo-Norman trotting horse, son of the Thoroughbred The Heir of Linne, considered a founding stallion of the French Trotter breed. An average competitor, Phaéton, a cross between a Thoroughbred and a Norfolk Trotter, made his name thanks to the excellent performances of his offspring during his stallion career at the Haras National du Pin. Phaéton became one of the four great founders of the modern French Trotteur, along with the stallions Normand, Conquérant and Lavater.

Phaéton was a 1.61 m chestnut stallion, strongly marked with white and renowned for his good looks, despite a hereditary defect in the conformation of his hocks. His male line continues through his son James Watt, the line of his best son, Harley, having disappeared.

== Denomination ==
Journalist and historian Jean-Pierre Reynaldo (1949–2014) spelled this horse's name "Phaëton", noting that it is also named "Phaéton". Paul Guillerot, in L'Élevage du trotteur en France (1896), used the name "Phaëton", as does Albert Viel (1923). On the other hand, Louis Baume, in Influence des courses au trot sur la production chevaline en France (1913) and in the anonymous article signed "Trotting" in Sport universel illustré (1901), wrote "Phaéton".

== History ==
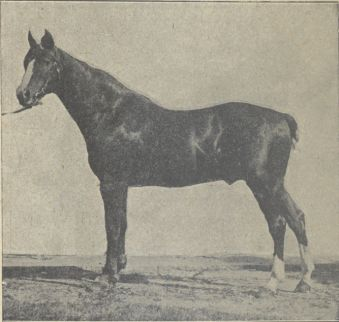

Phaéton was born in 1871 in Saint-André-de-Bohon, near Carentan, at the home of breeder Jules Lécuyer, in the Manche department of Normandy, France. He came from a cross between trotter and galloper (Thoroughbred), which Paul Guillerot called a "direct or reverse cross". Unlike many horses from this type of crossbreed, Phaéton has retained an aptitude for trotting only.

He was bought at weaning age by Mr. L. (or Edmond) Revel, who showed him on the racecourse under his colors. His sporting career proved average, given the small number of trotting competitors in his day. He raced at the age of 3 and 4, winning four of the races in which he took part, with a maximum kilometer reduction of 1 min 45 s, a relatively uncertain measurement.

=== 3-year-old racing season ===
Phaéton made his debut at the Rouen derby, completing the 4,000 m in 7 min 44 s to finish second, behind a son of the stallion Conquérant, Plaisir des Dames. His second race was the Prix du Conseil Général de la Manche at Cherbourg, in which he was beaten by Oak, a horse owned by the Duke of Vicenza, and his half-brother Pactole. At Cabourg, he was beaten by Pourquoi Pas and another half-brother, Prince. He won his first race at Le Pin, beating Pactole, Pique Hardy, Plaisir des Dames, Pourquoi Pas and several other competitors. His racing season ended in failure at the stallion event in Caen, where he finished sixth behind 4-year-olds and Pactole. His earnings for his 3-year-old season totaled 3,200 francs, his best time being 7 min 28 s over 4,000 meters in his victory at Le Pin.

=== 4-year-old racing season ===
In 1875, Phaéton began his 4-year-old racing season with a failure at Morlaix, beaten by his half-brother Pactole. His second race of the season, the Prix du Conseil Général at Caen, ended in victory over Quinola and Prince. He repeated his good performance at Falaise, beating Plaisir des Dames. He was presented at the Tarbes stallion trial, where he beat all the other horses in the region. His last race was at Caen, where he finished 3rd behind Pactole and Pourquoi Pas. His 4-year-old season ended with 7,100 francs in earnings and a kilometer reduction improved to 1 min 45 s.

Statistically, Phaéton was not the best trotter of his generation, having proved roughly equal to Plaisir des Dames and Pourquoi Pas, and less good than his half-brother Pactole.

=== Breeding career at Haras National du Pin ===
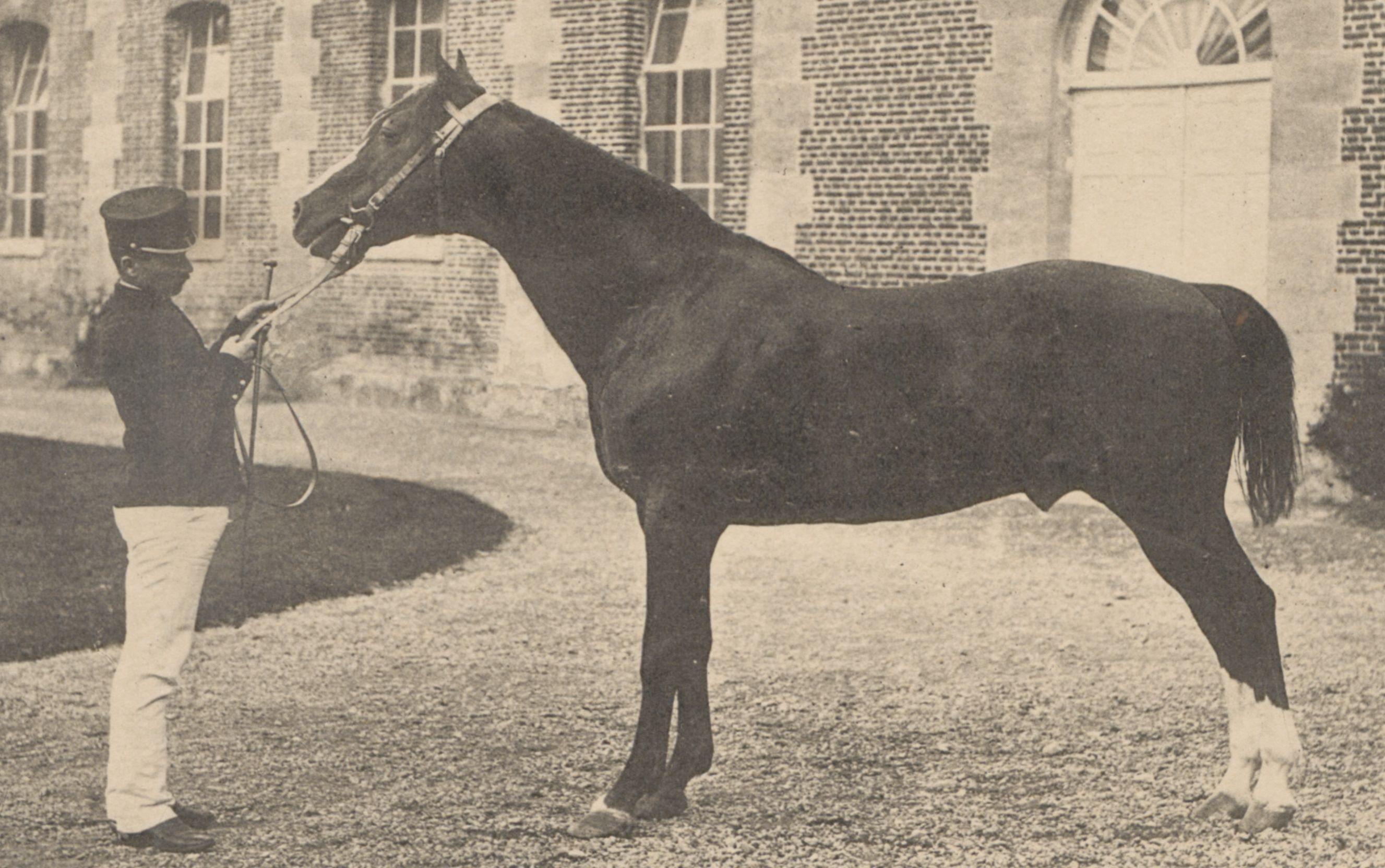

Phaéton was purchased by the Haras Nationaux for the sum of 12,000 francs and sent to the Haras National du Pin. He remained at stud until his death in 1896, with the exception of 1884 and 1885, when he was ridden in Calvados.

At the start of his breeding career, he seemed to have attracted few breeders from the Orne. His first foals raced in 1880, but it wasn't until 1885 that major competitors established Phaéton's reputation as a stallion. In 1886, Phaéton became the leading trotting stallion, a position he held until 1889. He made the fortunes of the breeders who kept his daughters as broodmares.

Phaéton died in the first weeks of 1896.

== Description ==
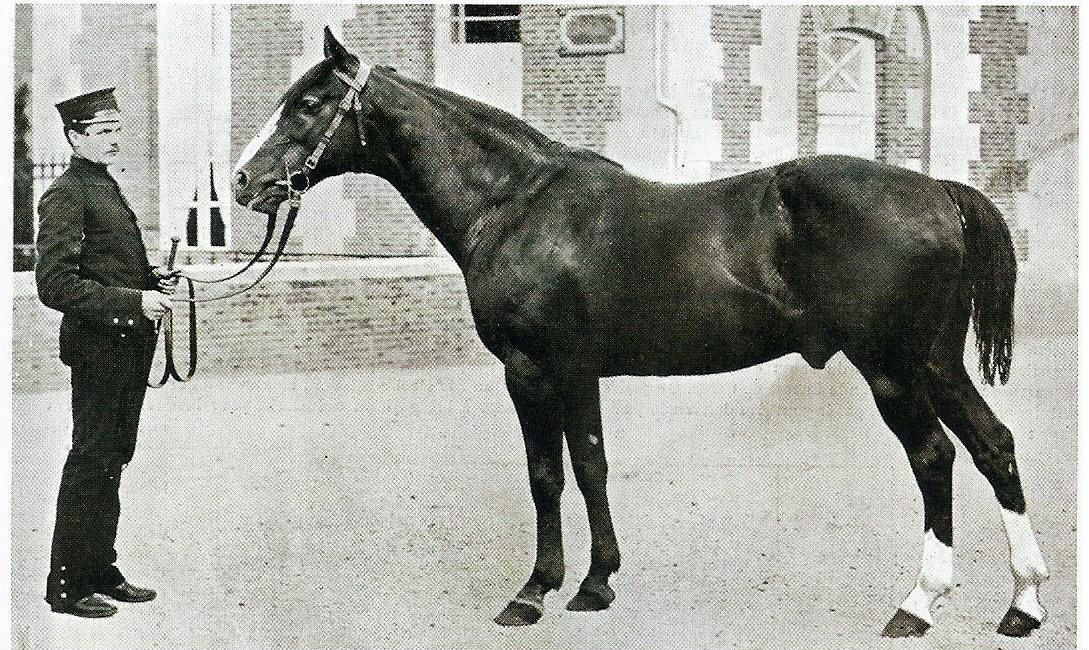

Phaéton was renowned for his handsome appearance, betraying his Thoroughbred origins; indeed, he was three-quarters Thoroughbred. Jean-Pierre Reynaldo classified him as Anglo-Norman, while the Infochevaux database of the Institut français du cheval et de l'équitation listed Phaéton as a French Trotter.

The stallion was described in Le Sport universel illustré of 23 March 1901 as a "handsome horse" with a golden chestnut coat, two barnacles on the hind legs and a broad head list, and measuring 1.61 m at the withers. His morphology was reminiscent of a saddle horse, with long lines and short loins. His hips were relatively round, and his chest and neck were said to be perfect. The head attachment was reminiscent of the Thoroughbred. His tissues were particularly fine. Its legs were devoid of dewlap.

The gutter behind the hock was said to be too narrow, resulting in a hock that was "too arched", a conformation fault that has been passed on to his descendants.

The breed's temperament was said to have been difficult in its early years, softening over time.

== Origins ==
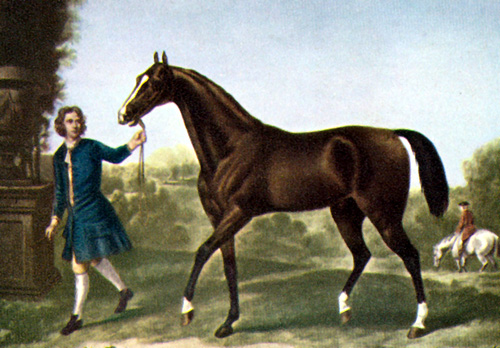

The Count of Comminges cited Phaéton's pedigree, insisting on the presence of Thoroughbred ancestors. Édouard Nicard estimated Phaéton's Thoroughbred origins at around 60%. Phaéton's other origins, shared with other founder stallions of the French Trotteur, are Norfolk trotters. Phaéton was thus marked by a dual origin between Thoroughbred gallopers in his paternal line, and a mix between Norfolk Trotters and English half-bred hunters in his maternal line. Édouard Nicard believed that the combination of Thoroughbred and Norfolk Trotter was the key to Phaéton's success as a sire, the former conferring speed, the latter trotting ability. Louis Baume believed that Phaéton drew his trotting ability from his dam, and points out that the Carentan region was the birthplace of two other founding stallions of the French Trotter: Conquérant and Fuschia; he attributed this to the influence of trotting races held in Cherbourg and Saint-Lô.

The stallions Conquérant and Normand were descended from Thoroughbred founder Godolphin Arabian, but Phaéton was a male descendant of Darley Arabian, through his Thoroughbred sire The Heir of Linne (of whom he was the best-known son). The Heir of Linne took part in the prestigious Goodwood Cup, then was imported from the British Isles. He was acquired by the Haras National de Saint-Lô in 1859. He was a rather light, slender stallion with a long neck. His influence modified the horses' trotting style, tending to replace the knee movement with a longer, more extended trot, almost grazing. Of this Thoroughbred's thirteen trotting sons, only Phaéton has gone down in history. The Heir of Linne was also the sire of Modestie, herself the dam of Tigris. He was also a distant descendant of Eclipse. Phaéton's paternal grandmother, originally named Louisa Newell, then renamed Mistress Walkers, had a racing career in England and France, where she was sold due to poor results.

Phaéton's dam, the mare La Crocus (named "Ambition" by Edmond Gast), by her parents Crocus and Élisa, was also a half-sister to Conquérant. She was a mare that Reynaldo described as "naughty", heavily impregnated with Norfolk blood, and badly conformed in the hocks. Phaéton was her only known foal, as La Crocus was difficult to breed, so her breeder sold her after her first foaling. According to Sport Universel Illustré, the mare's three other foals proved to be mediocre.

Élisa (or "Jeune Élisa" to differentiate her from her dam of the same name) was a mare featured in the vast majority of French Trotter genealogies. She raced at Falaise, Le Pin, La Meauffe and Avranches in 1856. Her origins lie in the Norfolk Trotter and Thoroughbred. Her dam, Élisa or Élise, described as an "Anglo-Poitevin broodmare" by Edmond Gast, was owned by Joseph Lafosse, who bought her on the advice of Baron de Taya, director of the Haras National de Saint-Lô farm. Jeune Élisa's sire, Corsair, was a chestnut stallion measuring 1.59 m, born in 1845, who stood at Saint-Lô between 1852 and 1860.

Genealogical information about him can be found in various databases, including HorseTelex, Infochevaux, as well as in period books by Nicard and Gast.

Pedigree of Phaéton (1871–1896)
Sire The Heir of Linne (1853)	Galaor (1838)	Muley-Moloch (1830)	Muley (1810)
Sire The Heir of Linne (1853)	Galaor (1838)	Muley-Moloch (1830)	Nancy (1813)
Sire The Heir of Linne (1853)	Galaor (1838)	Darioletta (1822)	Amadis (1807)
Sire The Heir of Linne (1853)	Galaor (1838)	Darioletta (1822)	Selima (1810)
Sire The Heir of Linne (1853)	Mrs. Walker (1844)	Jereed (1834)	Sultan (1816)
Sire The Heir of Linne (1853)	Mrs. Walker (1844)	Jereed (1834)	No info
Sire The Heir of Linne (1853)	Mrs. Walker (1844)	Fille de Zinganee (1837)	No info
Sire The Heir of Linne (1853)	Mrs. Walker (1844)	Fille de Zinganee (1837)	No info
Dam La Crocus (1866)	Crocus (1858)	Hood's Fireaway (1852)	W. Burgess Fireaway (1844)
Dam La Crocus (1866)	Crocus (1858)	Hood's Fireaway (1852)	No info
Dam La Crocus (1866)	Crocus (1858)	Fire Phenomenon (1840)	The Norfolk Cob (1819)
Dam La Crocus (1866)	Crocus (1858)	Fire Phenomenon (1840)	No info
Dam La Crocus (1866)	Élisa (1853–1881)	Corsair (1845)	Knox's Corsair (1820)
Dam La Crocus (1866)	Élisa (1853–1881)	Corsair (1845)	Fille de Cleveland (1833)
Dam La Crocus (1866)	Élisa (1853–1881)	Élise (1831)	Marcellus (1819)
Dam La Crocus (1866)	Élisa (1853–1881)	Élise (1831)	La Panachée (1819)

Phaéton was a nephew of two other great founding stallions of the French Trotteur Conquérant and Lavater. A striking aspect of his origins was therefore the presence of ancestors shared with other great founding stallions of the French Trotter breed, resulting in "a degree of inbreeding close to that of the Normandy trotting breed". The Heir of Linne was a nephew of the stallion Conquérant, while the stallion Tigris was out of Lavater and the mare Modestie, a daughter of The Heir of Linne.

== Descent ==
According to Guillerot (1896), Phaëton was a remarkable stallion. His descendants showed a natural disposition for trotting, attributed to the influence of the stallion The Heir of Linne. According to Sport universel illustré of 23 March 1901, "among the stallions who have contributed most to the formation of the trotting breed in France, Phaéton was considered by all breeders as the one whose loss was most regrettable, and all trotting men agreed to give him the title of King of Stallions". His sons and daughters inherited his distinction and great lines, fine fabrics and beautiful manes "softer than silk", the only morphological faults passed down and noted being a too-short thigh, a too-flat kidney, and, most damaging of all, jardon. His descendants also inherited his extensive white markings, and sometimes white markings under the belly. He transmitted a model of a good saddle horse, close to the Thoroughbred.

Phaéton was considered a founding stallion of the French Trotter breed; the Que sais-je? (1967 and 1982 editions) devoted to horse racing list him among the five stallions born in the 1870s, from which 90% of today's French Trotter horses are descended. The classic crossbreed from which French Trotters were descended in the early 20th century was a cross between Fuschia's line and his own.

In 1901, eighteen of the thirty-eight trotter stallions available at the Haras National du Pin were descended from Phaëton.

=== Sons and daughters ===
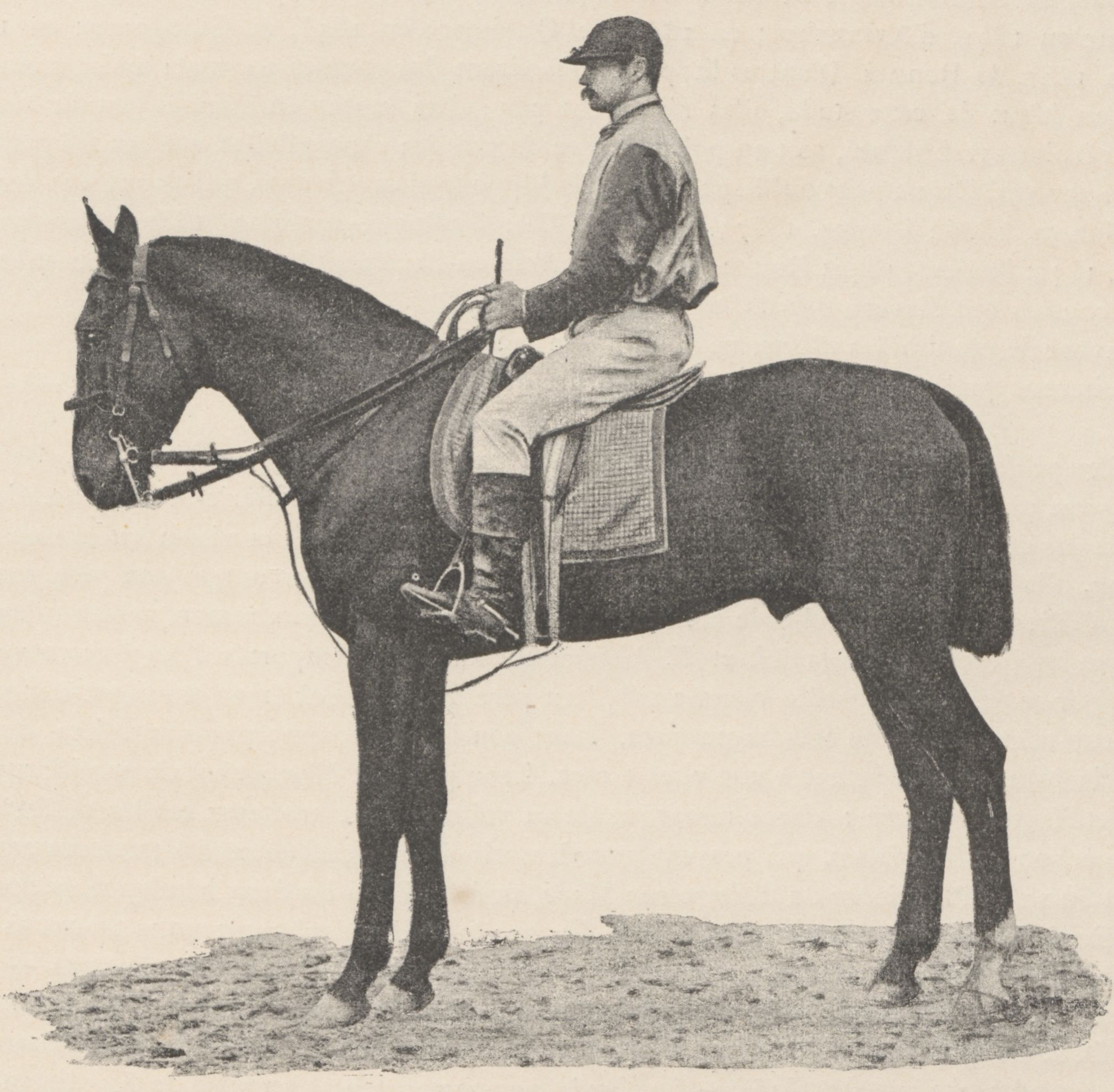

Albert Viel and Reynaldo counted 193 trotters as sons or daughters of Phaëton. His daughters proved better competitors than his sons.

Among Phaéton's best sons, Guillerot listed the stallions Harley, James Watt, Kachemyr (or Kaschmyr), Napoléon, Galba and Levraut. Le Sport universel illustré added Narcisse to the list of Phaéton's best sons. Louis Baume listed Harley and James Watt as Phaéton's two best sons, with Ollivier adding Narcisse. The stallion Napoléon (1 min 32 s) could have joined this trio, but he died early.

Among the daughters, Guillerot cited Aiglonne (1 min 38 s), Diva (1 min 40 s), Dulcinée (dam of Messagère), Ellora (1 min 35 s), Escapade (dam of Osmonde by Fuschia), Étincelle (1 min 39 s), Finland (1 min 37 s, winner of the Rouen Derby and 53,000 francs her 3yo year), Flore (1 min 37 s), Gérance (1 min 41 s), Javotte (1 min 40 s), Kyrielle (1 min 38 s), Lydia (1 min 35 s), Mandragore (1 min 37 s), Néva (1 min 37 s), Nitouche (1 min 39 s) and Tricoteuse (1 min 36 s), among the most remarkable. Ellora, in particular, set a speed record of 1 min 34 s and earned 34,000 francs during her career. Escapade, a remarkable competitor, stood out even more as a broodmare.

Phaéton had numerous other foals, including some of very ordinary quality, such as Elski and Emir. His foals included Jaloux (ex-Jalon), by the mare Lucrèce, winner of 760 francs at 3; Sans Nom (by Zaïne); Italien, by the mare Rainette, Favorite, Fauvette II and Flibustier, by the mare Voltigeuse, considered his best son at the time. A handwritten note in Guillerot's book, taken up by Albert Viel, stated that the mare Ergoline (dam of the famous Bémécourt) was a daughter of Phaéton, and not of Écho, considered a mediocre stallion: the Haras staff were short of covering cards for Phaéton, so an Écho card was given for the covering of Ergoline's dam, Camélia. The mare Bonne Mère was a daughter of Typique or Phaéton, by Harmonie, who won 36,999 francs in races between her 3 and 7 years, for a mileage reduction of 1 min 37 s. Belle Charlotte, another daughter of Phaéton by Harmonie, earned 550 francs racing in her 3rd year.

=== Grandsons and granddaughters ===
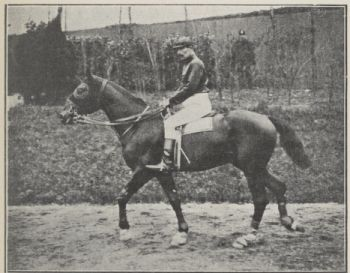

Phaéton's daughters, crossed with the breed leader Fuschia, have produced excellent trotters such as Messagère, Nitouche, Hérode, Hetman and Osmonde. In Le Modèle et les Allures (1908), Maurice de Gasté noted: "In the classic alliance of Fuschia and Phaéton, Fuschia transmits above all the mechanical construction, adaptation, Phaéton gives above all the perfection of the cell, quality".

Phaéton's grandsons in the maternal lineage included Intérim (by Acquila); Soubrette (by Arcole); Hermine II, Hirondelle II, Ilote, Jaquar, Jaseuse and Kerisper (all out of the Beaugé stallion); Aurore, Iéna, Jongleuse II, Kagoula, Kaviar, Kyrielle, Laura, Marcelet, Mimosa, Miracle, Myosotis, Nabucho, Narcisse (by Fauvette II, winner of 26,662 francs at 3), Nemea, Nevada, Offembach, Orfa, Pastourelle, Pénéloppe, Pensez Y, Perfica, Perle Fine and Petite Chance (by Cherbourg); Gallia, Héroïne and Œil de Bœuf (by Dictateur); La France, Mina and Quenotte (by Don Quichotte); Marie Louise (by Écho); Gavotte, Icarie, Jéricho, Jitomir, Jonquille, Jouvence, Kalmie, Kermes, Kiffis, Laïs, Lancelot, Lavardin, Léopard, Limier, Mancelie, Mancini, Marengo, Mignarde, Minerve, Nageur, Nitouche, Ochosias, Ostende, Ouvreuse, Pembroke, Perette, Picolo, Qu'y Met On, Rose Noire, Soubrette, Tirelire and Tubéreuse; Herman, Kadéja, Kerman, Kina, Koléah, Lavoisier, Liancourt, Louveteau, Mamertin, Mandarine, Mica, Montrésor, Nautilus, Nonantaise, Normandelle, Ohio, Orangère, Pétillante and Quotiant (by Élan); Lanleff, Luron, Ma Cousine, Nicotine, Novice (by Étendard); La Fresnaye, Léonidas and Lina (by Fier à Bras).

=== Phaéton's lineage ===
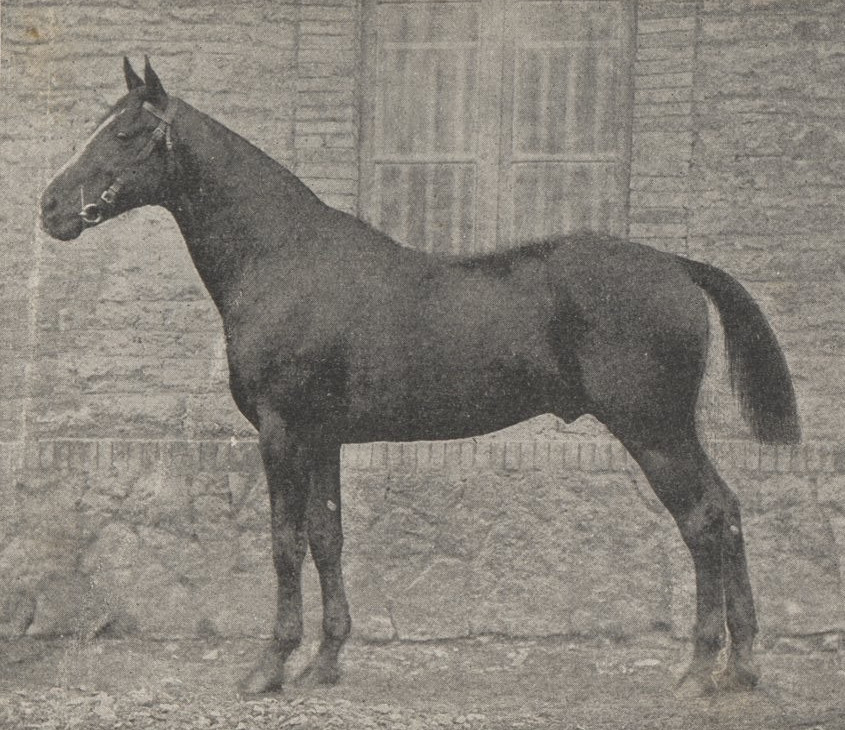

When establishing the pedigree of French Trotters for his 1896 study, Paul Guillerot classified Phaéton as "the most glorious offspring" from the stock of Thoroughbred The Heir of Linne. In 1913, Louis Baume established four major lineages in the French Trotter: Conquérant, Normand, Lavater and Phaéton. These lineages interbred, reducing the high level of inbreeding between Fuschia and Phaéton offspring in the French Trotteur.

Phaéton's male lineage survived only thanks to his son James Watt, who produced a single good stallion, Uranus, sire of the remarkable Enoch.

Le Sport universel illustré considered Harley to be a better stallion, whose only fault lies in the plumbness of his forelegs. His lineage would have disappeared if Mr. Céran-Maillard hadn't welcomed the Franco-Russian stallion Virois, sire of Reynold V, himself dead without a male descendant to perpetuate his lineage.

In his 2015 book, Jean-Pierre Reynaldo cited the "Phaëton lineage" to which he assigned the number "3", and which he divided into three branches: that of Enfant de Troupe (3a); that of Javari (3b), which was propagated thanks to the stallions Quioco and Jiosco; and that of Janus (3c). These three branches are descended from three sons of the stallion Quo Vadis.

The Heir of Linne (1853)	Phaéton (1871)	Harley (1885)	Virois (1899)	Reynolds V (1917)							
The Heir of Linne (1853)	Phaéton (1871)	James Watt (1887)	Uranus (1898)	Enoch (1904)	Quo Vadis (1916)	Enfant de Troupe (1926)	Ksar Wilkes (1932)	Eboué Wilkes (1948)	Quiscale (1960)	Coppet (1968)	Opprime (1980)
The Heir of Linne (1853)	Phaéton (1871)	James Watt (1887)	Uranus (1898)	Enoch (1904)	Quo Vadis (1916)	Javari (1931)	Vermont (1943)	Quioco (1960)	Minou du Donjon (1978)		
The Heir of Linne (1853)	Phaéton (1871)	James Watt (1887)	Uranus (1898)	Enoch (1904)	Quo Vadis (1916)	Javari (1931)	Vermont (1943)	Quioco (1960)	Jiosco (1975)		Fac Similé (1993)
The Heir of Linne (1853)	Phaéton (1871)	James Watt (1887)	Uranus (1898)	Enoch (1904)	Quo Vadis (1916)	Javari (1931)	Vermont (1943)	Quioco (1960)	Nodesso (1979)		
The Heir of Linne (1853)	Phaéton (1871)	James Watt (1887)	Uranus (1898)	Enoch (1904)	Quo Vadis (1916)	Janus (1931)	Voronoff (1943)	Kalfog (1954)			
The Heir of Linne (1853)	Phaéton (1871)	James Watt (1887)	Uranus (1898)	Enoch (1904)	Quo Vadis (1916)	Janus (1931)	Voronoff (1943)	Queyja (1960)			

== Sire line tree ==
- Phaéton
  - Harley
    - Virois
      - Reynolds
  - James Watt
    - Soliman
    - Uranus
      - Enoch
        - Quo Vadis
    - Aunay
      - Horloger

== Bibliography ==
- Baume, Louis (1913). Influence des courses au trot sur la production chevaline en France [The influence of trotting on horse production in France] (in French). Paris.
- de Cominges, Marie-Aimery (1898). Le Cheval de selle en France [Saddle horses in France] (in French). Paris: A. Legoupy.
- Gast, Edmond. Le Cheval normand et ses origines : situation hippique de la France, étalons nationaux; Orne, Calvados, Manche, différents élevages, généalogies, portraits; courses au trot; remontes militaires; percherons...tr [The Norman horse and its origins: France's equestrian situation, national stallions; Orne, Calvados, Manche, different breedings, genealogies, portraits; trotting races; military remounts; percherons...] (in French). Paris.
- Gallier, Alfred (1908). Le Cheval de demi-sang, races françaises [Half-blood horses, French breeds]. L'Agriculture au XXe siècle (in French). Laveur.
- Guillerot, Paul. L'Élevage du trotteur en France : pedigrees, performances, records, productions des étalons appartenant à l'État et aux particuliers [Trotter breeding in France: pedigrees, performances, records, production of state-owned and privately-owned stallions] (in French). Paris: Chamuel.
- Nicard, Édouard. Le Pur-sang anglais et le Trotteur français devant le transformisme [The English Thoroughbred and the French Trotter in the face of transformism] (in French). Nevers: Mazeron frères.
- Ollivier, A. (1902). Généalogies chevalines anglo-normandes en ligne mâle [Anglo-Norman horse genealogies in male lineage] (in French). H. Rebuffé.
- Reynaldo, Jean-Pierre (2015). Le Trotteur français : histoire des courses au trot en France des origines à nos jours [Le Trotteur français: the history of trotting in France from its origins to the present day] (in French). Panazol: Lavauzelle-Graphic éditions. ISBN 978-2-7025-1638-6.
- Reynaldo, Jean-Pierre (2019). Ephrem Houël : inventeur de la science hippique et créateur des premières courses au trot en France [Ephrem Houël: inventor of horse science and creator of the first trotting races in France] (in French). Monaco: éditions du Rocher. ISBN 978-2-268-10234-4. OCLC 1122855727.
- Trotting (1901). Phaéton et sa descendance [Phaeton and his descendants] (in French). Paris: Le Sport universel illustré.
- Trotting (1901b). Phaéton et sa descendance (suite) [Phaeton and his descendants (continued)] (in French). Paris: Le Sport universel illustré.
- Viel, Albert (1923). Le Trotteur Français – Phaëton (in French). Paris: Le Sport universel illustré.
