= Medley (horse) =

British Thoroughbred racehorse

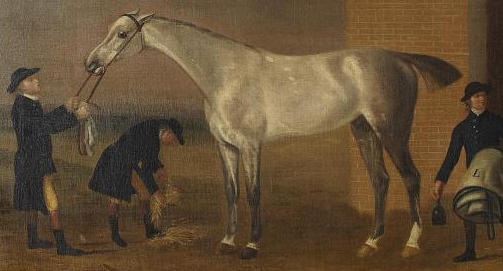
- Medley, painted by John Francis Sartorius
- Sire: Gimcrack
- Grandsire: Cripple
- Dam: Arminda
- Damsire: Snap
- Sex: Stallion
- Foaled: 1776
- Country: Great Britain
- Colour: Grey
- Breeder: Richard Grosvenor, 1st Earl Grosvenor
- Owner: John Lade; Malcolm Hart; James Wilkinson

Medley (1776–1792) was a British Thoroughbred racehorse who was imported to the United States after the American Revolutionary War, becoming one of the foundation stallions of the American Thoroughbred.

== Background ==
Medley was a 14 hands (56 inches, 142 cm) gray Thoroughbred foaled in 1776. He was sired by Gimcrack, a grandson of the Godolphin Arabian; his dam, Arminda, was sired by Snap out of Miss Cleveland (by Regulus). He was bred by Richard Grosvenor, 1st Earl Grosvenor, one of the most influential horse breeders of the Regency era in Great Britain.

== Career and importation ==
During his racing career, Medley was purchased from Lord Grosvenor by Sir John Lade. In the early 1780s, Medley had a successful four seasons of racing, and won a total of 11 plates. Afterwards, he was acquired by Tattersalls, who sold him for about $500 to the investment firm "Hart and McDonald" of Louisa, Virginia. Medley was one of six Thoroughbred racing stallions purchased, and was intended to be resold upon their arrival in the United States, following the repeal of the Non-Importation Act of 1771.

Medley arrived in Virginia in 1784 on the ship Theodorick. One of the firm partners, Malcolm Hart, decided to keep Medley for himself, and stood the stallion at stud at his stable at Hanover Courthouse in Virginia. Hart moved Medley every season for about 8 years, including some reports of him bringing Medley to Tennessee from 1790 to 1792, before Hart eventually sold a 50% stake in the horse to James Wilkinson.

In 1792, Medley colicked and died soon after arriving at Wilkinson's Millbrook Plantation in Virginia. He was 16 years old.

== Stud record ==
While Medley only had eight seasons at stud, he made a profound impact on the early American Thoroughbred breed. Much like his sire, Gimcrack, Medley often passed his small height and gray coloring to his offspring, but still sired "the best racers of his day". Medley was also a favorite of John Tayloe III, who often bred the stallion to his mares. Several mares sired by Medley were also bred to Diomed, who was imported to Virginia in 1798.

It was said that "could get a winner on any sort of Thoroughbred mare, and sometimes on mares that were not Thoroughbred".

Medley's progeny includes, but is not limited to:

- Tayloe's Bellair II (b. 1786), out of Young Selima by Tayloe's Yorick (Byerley Turk sire line), called "the champion of the Virginia turf"
- Randolph's Gimcrack (b. 1786), out of a mare by Brent's Ariel (Byerley Turk sire line)
- Tayloe's Grey Diomed (b. 1786), out of a mare by Sloe (Byerley Turk sire line)
- Tayloe's Quicksilver (b. 1789), out of a mare by Syme's Wildair, a grandson of Regulus (Godolphin Arabian sire line)
- Tayloe's Calypso (b. 1792), out of Young Selima by Tayloe's Yorick (Byerley Turk sire line)

Medley is most notable as a broodmare and dam sire, with his daughters and granddaughters becoming crucial foundation stock.

== Sire line tree ==
- Medley
  - Gimcrack
  - Young Medley
  - Bellair II
  - Grey Diomed
  - Lamplighter
  - Quicksilver
  - Boxer
    - Mendoza
      - Wild Medley
  - Grey Medley
  - Melzar
  - Alfred
