= 1782 in sports =

1782 in sports describes the year's events in world sport.

== Cricket ==
Events

- David Harris made his known first-class debut

England

- Most runs – William Bowra 144
- Most wickets – Robert Clifford 24

== Horse racing ==
England

- The Derby – Assassin
- The Oaks – Ceres
- St Leger Stakes – Imperatrix
