= Lath (horse) =

British Thoroughbred racehorse

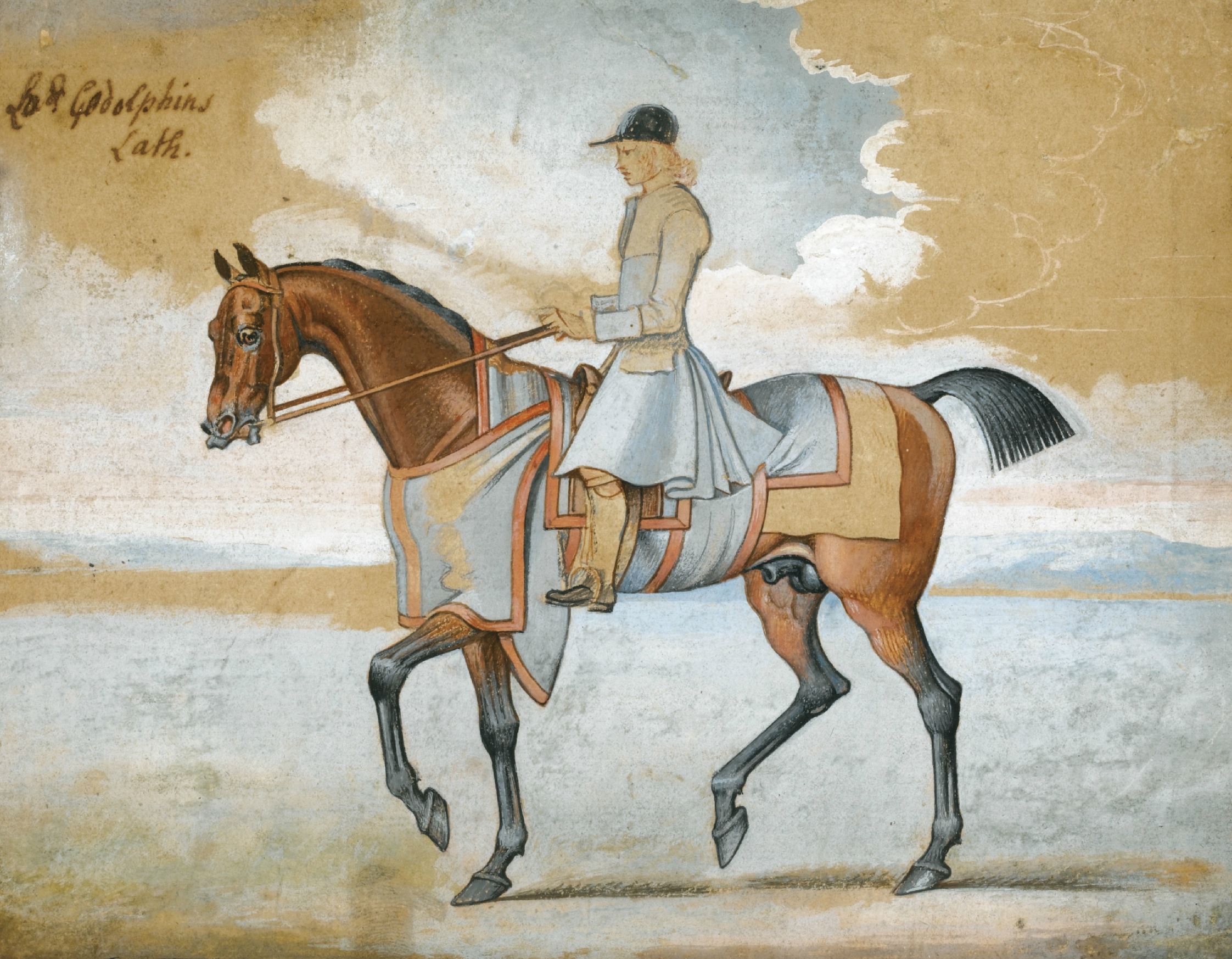
- Lath painted by James Seymour
- Sire: Godolphin Arabian
- Dam: Roxana
- Damsire: Bald Galloway
- Sex: Stallion
- Foaled: 1732
- Country: Great Britain
- Colour: Bay
- Breeder: 2nd Earl of Godolphin
- Owner: 2nd Earl of Godolphin; John Turner; 3rd Duke of Devonshire

Major wins
- Great Stakes (1737); Match against Little Partner (1737); Match against Squirt (1738)

Lath (foaled 1732) was a British Thoroughbred racehorse. He won at least four races, including a 1000-guinea sweepstakes at Newmarket and a match race against Squirt. After retiring from racing he became a stallion and produced a number of high-class runners and also sired the grand-dam of St. Leger winner Hollandoise.

== Background ==
Lath was a bay colt bred by Francis Godolphin, 2nd Earl of Godolphin, and foaled in 1732. His dam was Roxana, a daughter of Bald Galloway. In 1731 she was intended to be covered by Hobgoblin, but he refused her, so she was sent to the Godolphin Arabian, who at the time was acting as a teaser stallion to Hobgoblin. The mating produced Lath, who was the Godolphin Arabian's first foal. Roxana later foaled Roundhead (by Flying Childers) and Cade (also by Godolphin Arabian). After Lath's success on the racetrack, the Godolphin Arabian went on to become a top stallion and was champion sire in 1738, 1745 and 1747. He sired Cade, Regulus and Blank, who also went on to become champion sires.

== Racing career ==
On 23 April 1737, he won a sweepstakes of 1000 guineas at Newmarket, beating the Earl of Portmore's Squirt and Duke of Devonshire's John Trott along with seven others. Later in the year, he beat Little Partner over four miles for 200 guineas. In October 1738, he beat Squirt, also over four miles, for 300 guineas. He also won a race for £50 at Marlborough. He was described as "one of the best horses that appeared at Newmarket since the time of Childers."

=== Summary of known races ===
Date	Race name	Dist (miles)	Course	Prize	Runners	Place	Runner-up
23 April 1737	Great Stakes	4	Newmarket	1000 guineas	10	1	Squirt
26 October 1737	Match race	4	Newmarket	200 guineas	2	1	Mr Vane's Little Partner
October 1738	Match race	4	Newmarket	200 guineas	2	1	Squirt
October 1738	not known	not known	Marlborough	50 guineas	not known	1	not known

== Stud career ==
After retiring from racing Lath was sold to John Turner and later William Cavendish, 3rd Duke of Devonshire. The most notable of Lath's progeny were:

- Red Cap (1744) – a chestnut stallion who won a race at Ludlow and one at Newmarket.
- Miss (1754) – a chestnut mare who foaled the dam of Great Subscription Purse winner Chatsworth.
- Ancaster Crazy – a chestnut mare who foaled Virago, the winner of many races and dam of St.Leger winner Hollandoise.

== Pedigree ==
Pedigree of Lath, bay stallion, 1732
Sire Godolphin Arabian	(unknown)	(unknown)	(unknown)
Sire Godolphin Arabian	(unknown)	(unknown)	(unknown)
Sire Godolphin Arabian	(unknown)	(unknown)	(unknown)
Sire Godolphin Arabian	(unknown)	(unknown)	(unknown)
Sire Godolphin Arabian	(unknown)	(unknown)	(unknown)
Sire Godolphin Arabian	(unknown)	(unknown)	(unknown)
Sire Godolphin Arabian	(unknown)	(unknown)	(unknown)
Sire Godolphin Arabian	(unknown)	(unknown)	(unknown)
Dam Roxana (GB) 1718	Bald Galloway	St. Victor's Barb	(unknown)
Dam Roxana (GB) 1718	Bald Galloway	St. Victor's Barb	(unknown)
Dam Roxana (GB) 1718	Bald Galloway	Grey Whynot	Whynot
Dam Roxana (GB) 1718	Bald Galloway	Grey Whynot	Royal mare
Dam Roxana (GB) 1718	Akaster Turk mare	Akaster Turk	(unknown)
Dam Roxana (GB) 1718	Akaster Turk mare	Akaster Turk	(unknown)
Dam Roxana (GB) 1718	Akaster Turk mare	Sister to Leedes	Leedes Arabian
Dam Roxana (GB) 1718	Akaster Turk mare	Sister to Leedes	Spanker mare
