= Conquérant =

Named French Trotter horse

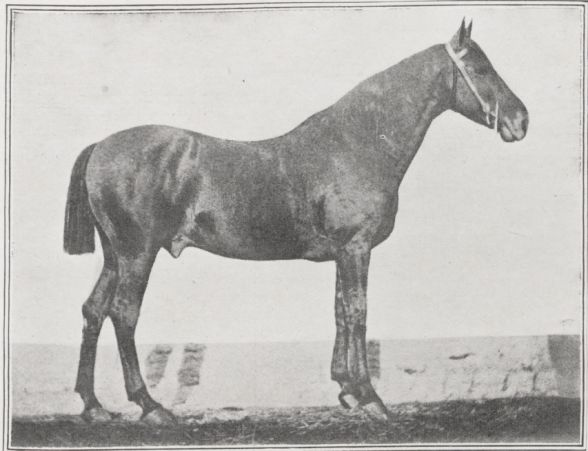
- Photograph of Conquérant reproduced in Le Sport universel illustré of July 6, 1923.
- Sire: Kapirat
- Dam: Élisa
- Sex: Male
- Foaled: Courtisane, Kilomètre, Lilas, Anita, Bécassine, Roquelaure, Galathée, Zaïne, Dalilah, Plaisir des dames, Sylvia, Orpheline, Quinola, Reynolds, Rustique, Rivoli, Rosière, Serpolet-rouan, Tentateur, Uriel, Dictateur, Beaugé, and Balsamine; Manche
- Color: Bay
- Owner: Pierre Étienne Joseph-Lafosee Haras National du Pin

Conquérant was a founding stallion of the French Trotter horse breed, born in 1858 in Cotentin, Normandy, to breeder Pierre Étienne Joseph-Lafosse, and died in 1880. Son of the mare Élisa and the stallion Kapirat, descended through him from the almost Thoroughbred Young Rattler, he had an excellent racing career in mounted trotting for the Basly stable. Sold to the Haras Nationaux in 1862 after his racing career, Conquérant became a sought-after sire of 66 trotters.

His lineage spread, mainly thanks to his son Reynolds, a mediocre competitor and sire of Fuschia. Through Fuschia, Conquérant's lineage is still very much alive in the French Trotter.

== Sources ==
Contemporary sources on Conquérant are mainly compiled in Les trotteurs, origines, performances et produits (1864) by hippologist and stud inspector Charles Du Haÿs (1818–1898). In Le Trotteur français (2007, reprinted 2015) horse historian Jean-Pierre Reynaldo devotes several pages to Conquérant.

== History ==
Conquérant was born in Cotentin (Manche department, Normandy), in 1858, to breeder Pierre Étienne Joseph-Lafosse. His sire is the stallion Kapirat and his dam the mare Élisa, by Corsaire. His mother was born on the same farm. According to A. Ollivier, it was on the advice of Baron de Taya, then director of the Haras Nationaux de Saint-Lô, that Conquérant's breeder had his mare Élisa covered by Kapirat.

Conquérant's birth coincided with the beginning of the widespread use of the letter of the year among horse breeders, 1858 being the year in which foals had to bear a name beginning with the letter "C". Conquérant was trained for racing by A. Basly, and made his racetrack debut in 1861, at the age of three, for the Basly stable.

He won a 1,000-franc prize in a 4-kilometer race at Saint-Lô, beating Capucin and Y. in 8 minutes and 57 seconds. He won 1,350 francs at the same race meeting, beating Pierson and three other horses over 5 kilometers in 10 minutes and 43 seconds.

Also in 1861, he won 1,200 francs at Le Pin, beating Pierson over 4 kilometers in 7 minutes and 55 seconds. Beaten in Caen in 1861 by Y. and Bon Coeur, he nevertheless won prizes over 4 km and 1 km at the same meeting. Reynaldo attributes this single defeat to "legitimate fatigue".

He was sold to the Haras Nationaux by Basly, and joined the national stallion ranks in 1862. From 1863 to 1880, Conquérant was a breeding stallion, mainly at the Haras Nationaux du Pin. In 1873, according to the Revue des haras, de l'agriculture et du commerce, he topped the list of trotting stallions with 40,460 francs collected by his offspring, ahead of Phœnomenon (29,700 francs).

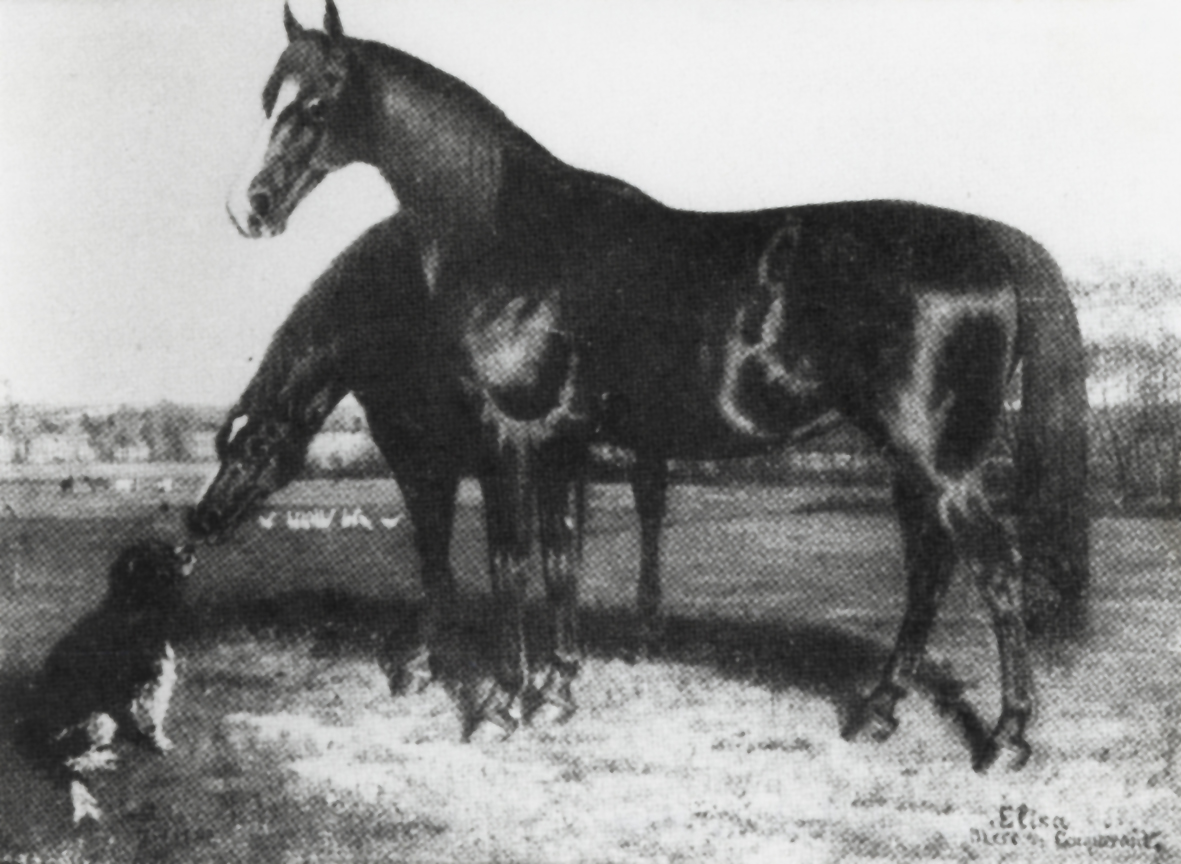
The mare Elisa, Conquérant's mother, based on a reproduction of a painting by Paul Le More.

In 1869, breeder Joseph-Lafosse sold his entire stable, keeping only Conquérant's dam, Élisa, who finally died of old age on November 20, 1881. On this occasion, he left a letter, found and reproduced by archivist Alain Talon:

"My poor old and good mare Élisa, Conquérant's mother, the first and fertile source of our Normandy trotters died this morning. When I came back from Mass, I found her lying stiff, near the entrance to the Gouey garden, which she had broken when she fell. I'd put her in this small, sheltered room for her to spend the winter in. I bent over my poor mare, a long tear still wetting her eyelid, as if her last tear had been for me. Involuntarily, I felt my eyes moisten. Élisa died of old age, almost without suffering, no doubt, she couldn't have had a better end? I cared for her in her last years as she deserved. I was not ungrateful to her and treated her as a friend. Her noble career is over, and I can do nothing more for her than give her regret. – Pierre Étienne Joseph-Lafosse, letter dated Sunday November 20, 1881

La France chevaline announced Conquérant's death in its September 18, 1880 issue.

== Description ==
According to Paul Guillerot, Conquérant is a bay stallion, 1.59 m tall. Édouard Nicard describes Conquérant and his son Reynolds as stallions with slightly drowned backs, a conformation typical of trotters of the period. Conquérant is light and slightly round, with straight hocks. Nicard estimates that Conquérant is 44% Thoroughbred, while Count Marie-Aimery de Comminges puts the figure at 38%.

Charles Du Haÿs considers him "the most beautiful son of the stallion Kapirat", endowed with magnificent gaits that he passes on to his foals. According to Ollivier, Conquérant remained famous for his ability to pass on his gaits.

== Origins ==
Conquérant came from crosses between two breeds of horse, the Norfolk Trotter and the Thoroughbred. The Norfolk Trotter can be traced back to both paternal and maternal origins. His sire, Kapirat, and his dam, Elisa, both came from crosses between Norfolk Trotters and Thoroughbreds. This type of crossing, which resulted from the introduction of the Trotter Norfolk in France, was common in the 19th century to produce the best speed trotters.

Pedigree of Conquérant (1858–1880)
Sire Kapirat (1844–1870)	Voltaire (1833)	Impérieux (1822)	Young Rattler (1811–1836)
Sire Kapirat (1844–1870)	Voltaire (1833)	Impérieux (1822)	Fille de Volontaire
Sire Kapirat (1844–1870)	Voltaire (1833)	La Pilot (1828)	Pilot
Sire Kapirat (1844–1870)	Voltaire (1833)	La Pilot (1828)	La Bachate
Sire Kapirat (1844–1870)	La Juggler (1838)	The Juggler (1832)	Wamba (1923)
Sire Kapirat (1844–1870)	La Juggler (1838)	The Juggler (1832)	Pantechnetheca (1825)
Sire Kapirat (1844–1870)	La Juggler (1838)	Fille de Young Topper (1810)	Young Topper (1812)
Sire Kapirat (1844–1870)	La Juggler (1838)	Fille de Young Topper (1810)	Fille de Cleveland
Dam Élisa (1853–1881)	Corsair (1845)	Knox's Corsair (1820)	Aughton Merrylegs (1837)
Dam Élisa (1853–1881)	Corsair (1845)	Knox's Corsair (1820)	No info
Dam Élisa (1853–1881)	Corsair (1845)	Fille de Cleveland (1833)	Cleveland (1818)
Dam Élisa (1853–1881)	Corsair (1845)	Fille de Cleveland (1833)	No info
Dam Élisa (1853–1881)	Élise (1831)	Marcellus (1819)	Selim (1802–1825)
Dam Élisa (1853–1881)	Élise (1831)	Marcellus (1819)	Briséis
Dam Élisa (1853–1881)	Élise (1831)	La Panachée (1819)	Dio (1813)
Dam Élisa (1853–1881)	Élise (1831)	La Panachée (1819)	La Belle Matador

=== Sire origin ===
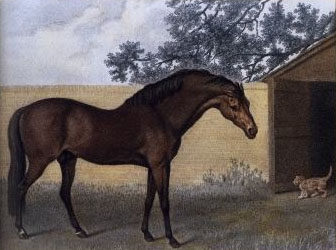
The Godolphin Arabian, Conquérant's most distant known male ancestor.

Conquérant belonged to the male lineage of the founding Thoroughbred stallion Godolphin Arabian, and thus descends from the stallions Matchem and Young Rattler, by Rattler. Young Rattler was the first Godolphin Arabian descendant to breed in France. Impérieux, paternal great-grand-sire of Conquérant, is described by Charles Du Haÿs as the best son of Young Rattler. Conquérant's paternal grandsire is Voltaire, a Norman hunter stallion son of Impérieux, from the Basly stable.

Kapirat, Conquérant's sire, was born in 1844 in the Orne region, and is described as an excellent stallion, energetic and robust; he stood from 1859 to 1870 in the Cotentin region.

=== Dam origin ===
Through his maternal grandmother Élise, Conquérant came from the same stock as another founding stallion of the French Trotter, Phaéton. However, the origins of his dam, the mare Élisa, born in 1853, are disputed. Trained for trotting races by the Basly stables, Élisa only raced for one year (in 1856). She became one of the most important founding mares of the French Trotter breed. She was the dam of La Crocus, herself the dam of Phaéton. Corsair (or Corsaire), Élisa's sire, was a chestnut stallion born in 1845, standing 1.59 m tall, who stood at the Haras Nationaux de Saint-Lô from 1852 to 1860.

Élisa's maternal grandmother may have been the mare La Panachée, born in 1819 at Médavy in the Orne region, then acquired by the royal stables of Charles X in 1825, which were dispersed following the Revolution of 1830. Panachée was covered in Anjou by the Thoroughbred stallion Marcellus, giving birth to the mare Élise, dam of Élisa. Élise, then aged around 20, was imported to Joseph-Lafosse's stables in Saint-Côme-du-Mont, where she gave birth to Élisa. The French Infochevaux database cites the mare Élise, daughter of Marcellus and La Panachée, as Élisa's dam. Charles Du Haÿs attests to this origin in his book L'Ancien Merlerault; he also states that Elisa was originally a Merlerault mare. The stallion Matador, an ancestor of Elisa, is the source of many other successful Normandy breedings.

Another mare named Élisa is cited as the dam of Élisa born in 1853. This mare was born in Anjou in 1831, and like Élise has the Thoroughbred Marcellus for sire, but her dam is the hunting mare Jenny, by Young Rattler. She was a famous flat and steeplechase racing mare, and would have given birth to young Elisa at the ripe old age of 22.

== Descendants ==
In 1896, Paul Guillerot wrote that Conquérant "was a sire of superior merit, and he endowed France with so many outstanding trotters [...] that he must be considered one of the most illustrious heads of the French trotting breed". In 1900, Alfred Gallier used almost the same phrase as Guillerot, considering Conquérant "to be the most illustrious head of the Norman trotting family". In Les familles de trotteurs (1908), Louis Cauchois, places Conquérant at the top of the list of five great sires at the origin of the French Trotter, as does Albert Viel in 1923, and then the Que sais-je? devoted to horse racing, published in 1967 by PUF and written by Jacques Gendry. Reynaldo also cites him as one of the most important breeders of the 19th century.

The Bulletin de la Société d'encouragement pour l'industrie nationale of 1900 lists Conquérant among the six stallions that have "contributed most to the improvement of the Norman breed since 1840". Conquérant was the stallion who most influenced Anglo-Norman trotter breeding in the 1860s, along with Normand.

According to Reynaldo, from 1863 to 1880, Conquérant sired 66 trotters. However, only a fraction of these will go down in history.

Conquérant (1858–1880)	Courtisane (1865)	Commère (1880)
Conquérant (1858–1880)	Kilomètre (1866)	
Conquérant (1858–1880)	Anita (1867)	Peschiera (1871)
Conquérant (1858–1880)	Lilas (1867)	Fugitive (1877)
Conquérant (1858–1880)	Bécassine (1868)	Déception (1878)
Conquérant (1858–1880)	Roquelaure (1869)	
Conquérant (1858–1880)	Galathée (1870)	
Conquérant (1858–1880)	Plaisir des dames (1871)	
Conquérant (1858–1880)	Dalilah (1871)	Candide (1882)
Conquérant (1858–1880)	Zaïne (1871)	Colporteur (1880)
Conquérant (1858–1880)	Sylvia (1871)	Aramis (1884)
Conquérant (1858–1880)	Orpheline (1871)	
Conquérant (1858–1880)	Quinola (1872)	
Conquérant (1858–1880)	Reynolds (1873)	Fuschia (1883–1908)
Conquérant (1858–1880)	Reynolds (1873)	Hémine (1885)
Conquérant (1858–1880)	Reynolds (1873)	Jachère
Conquérant (1858–1880)	Rivoli (1873)	Esther (1882)
Conquérant (1858–1880)	Rosière (1873)	Valdampierre (1877)
Conquérant (1858–1880)	Rosière (1873)	Arlette
Conquérant (1858–1880)	Rustique (1873)	
Conquérant (1858–1880)	Serpolet-rouan (1874)	César
Conquérant (1858–1880)	Tentateur (1875)	
Conquérant (1858–1880)	Uriel (1876)	
Conquérant (1858–1880)	Dictateur (1878)	
Conquérant (1858–1880)	Beaugé (1879)	
Conquérant (1858–1880)	Balsamine	Gréviste (1886)

Conquérant sired two fillies and a colt with the great champion Bayadère, but none of these three foals reached their dam's level.

=== Fillies ===
It is above all the mare Capucine, born in 1880 by Fortuna, who is considered the most famous daughter of Conquérant according to Alfred Gallier (1900), with a kilometer reduction of 1'35'' and earnings of 127,127 francs during her racing career.

Conquérant female fillies
Name	Year of birth	Dam	Kilometre reduction
Conquête	1864	Inkerman filly	1'45''
Courtisane	1865	Sans façon	
Tentative	1866	Succès or Sultane filly	
Anita	1867	Petite de mer	
Bécassine	1868	Blonde	
Rebecca	1870	American mare	
Pâquerette	1870	Modestie	1'45''
Galathée	1870	Bayadère	1'49''
Orpheline	1871	Bayadère	1'53''
Dalilah	1871	Virgule	
Perlette	1871		
Sylvia	1871	Fridoline	
Zaïne	1871	Atalante	
Patte de Velours	1873		1'47''
Virginie	1873		1'51''
Rosière	1873		
Yvonne	1875		1'44''
Capucine	1880	Fortuna	1'35''
Pervenche		Modestie	1'44''
Sultane			
Cendrillon			
Grenade		Vallée-d'Auge	
Balsamine			
Cocotte			

=== Coalts ===
The chestnut Beaugé, one of Conquérant's coalts by Miss-Ambition, born in 1879, died prematurely after three breeding seasons at the Haras Nationaux. The seal brown Dictateur, born to the Duc de Narbonne in 1878, had a fine racing career, earning 13,255 francs as a three-year-old, for a total of 44,485 francs during his two years of competition. Dictateur achieved a mileage reduction of 1'38''. However, this stallion left no sons worthy of him.

It is essentially the mediocre trotter Reynolds who ensures the survival of Conquérant's male line.

Name	Year of birth	Dam	Significant facts
Kilomètre	1866	Yelva	
Lilas	1867	Printemps filly	
Roquelaure	1869	Bayadère	1'50''
Plaisir des dames	1871	Othon	1'52''
Quinola	1872	Fridoline	Winner of the Rouen Derby in 1875
Rivoli	1873	Unknown Normand mare	
Reynolds	1873	Miss Pierce	1'56''
Rustique	1873	Fille d'Y.	
Serpolet-rouan	1874	La Mère	
Tentateur	1875		1'40''
Uriel	1876	Miss Pierce	1'38''
Dictateur	1878		1'38''
Beaugé	1879	Miss-Ambition	
Négociant			
Gringalet			

=== Conquérant's bloodlineage ===
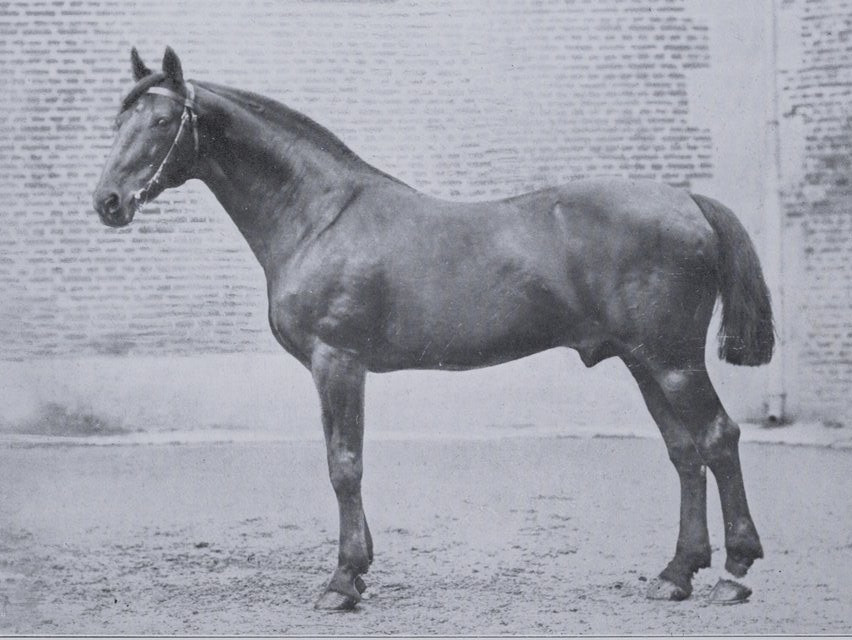
Fuschia, the Conquérant's grandson who perpetuated his lineage.

When Paul Guillerot established the lineages of the trotting breed in France in 1896, he credited two stallions descended from Young Rattler with founding a trotting line: Conquérant and Normand. He justifies this on the grounds that each of these two stallions has "sired trotters of such high order that both are entitled to give their name to their respective descendants".

Fuschia, son of the mediocre stallion Reynolds, was such a successful sire that, according to Cauchois and Reynaldo, by 1905, he had taken Conquérant's lineage to 40% of the lineages represented in the French Trotter. As Conquérant and Fuschia are not descended from The Heir of Linne Thoroughbred, their bloodlineages may have been crossed with that Thoroughbred's descendants. In particular, the cross between Conquérant – Fuschia and Phaéton was a great success.

According to Reynaldo, the Conquérant lineage remains very active at the beginning of the 21st century. He divides it into six branches: Kerjacques, Quinio, Hernani III, Intermède et Gaël, Fandango and Loudéac.

Conquérant (1858)	Reynolds (1873)	Fuschia (1889)	Narquois (1891)	Beaumanoir (1901)	Kœnigsberg (1910)	Boléro (1923)	Loudéac (1933)	Fandango (1944)
Conquérant (1858)	Reynolds (1873)	Fuschia (1889)	Bémécourt (1901)	Intermède (1908)	Gaël (1928)	Quiproco II (1938)		
Conquérant (1858)	Reynolds (1873)	Fuschia (1889)	Bémécourt (1901)	Ontario (1914)	Hernani III (1929)	Quinio (1938)	Dubonnet (1947)	
Conquérant (1858)	Reynolds (1873)	Fuschia (1889)	Bémécourt (1901)	Ontario (1914)	Hernani III (1929)	Quinio (1938)	Kerjacques (1954)	Chambon P (1968)
Conquérant (1858)	Reynolds (1873)	Fuschia (1889)	Bémécourt (1901)	Ontario (1914)	Hernani III (1929)	Atus II (1944)		

Through his maternal lineage, Conquérant is an ancestor of the famous Cherbourg stallion.

== Tribute ==
In 1879, his name was given to the Prix Conquérant, the oldest trotting race for 4-year-olds and one of the best endowed in France, serving as a prelude to the Prix du Président de la République.

== Bibliography ==
- Cauchois, Louis (1908). Les familles de trotteurs: classification des trotteurs français en familles maternelles numéretées, tables généalogiques et historique des principales familles (in French). Aux bureau de La France chevaline.
- Cousté, Henri (1897). Stud-book normand: les étalons de demi-sang rangés par familles (in French).
- Du Haÿs, Charles (1864). Les trotteurs: origines, performances et produits des individualités, qui ont le plus marqué dans les courses au trot (in French). CH Tanera et Ve Parent & fils.
- Du Haÿs, Charles (1865). L'ancien Merlerault (in French). Typ. Morris Père et fils.
- Gast, Edmond (1889). Le cheval normand et ses origines: situation hippique de la France, étalons nationaux; Orne, Calvados, Manche, différents élevages, généalogies, portraits; courses au trot; remontes militaires; percherons (in French). Paris. p. 131.
- Gallier, Alfred (1900). Le cheval Anglo-Normand: avec photogravures intercalées dans le texte. Baillière.
- Guillerot, Paul (1896). L'élevage du trotteur en France: pedigrees, performances, records, productions des étalons appartenant à l'État et aux particuliers (in French). Paris: Chamuel.
- Morin, A. (1876). Course au trot: liste des principaux vainqueurs en 1873 (in French). Revue des haras, de l'agriculture et du commerce.
- Ollivier, A. (1902). Généalogies chevalines Anglo-Normandes en ligne male (in French). H. Rebuffé.
- Nicard, Édouard (1898). Le pur sang anglais et le trotteur français devant le transformisme. Nevers: Mazeron frères.
- Reynaldo, Jean-Pierre (2015). Le trotteur français: Histoire des courses au trot en France des origines à nos jours (in French). Éditions Lavauzelle. ISBN 978-2-7025-1638-6.
- Talon, Alain (2012). "Le patrimoine archivistique et documentaire équin de la Manche: constitution et reconstitution; construction et valorisation des patrimoines et réciproquement". In Situ (in French) (18). In Situ. Revue des patrimoines. doi:10.4000/insitu.9642.
- Viel, Albert (1923). Le trotteur français - Conquérant (in French). Paris: Le Sport universel illustré.
