= Bourbon (horse) =

British Thoroughbred racehorse

- Sire: Le Sang
- Grandsire: Changeling
- Dam: Queen Elizabeth
- Damsire: Regulus
- Sex: Stallion
- Foaled: 1774
- Country: Kingdom of Great Britain
- Colour: Bay
- Breeder: Mr. William Sotheron
- Owner: Mr. William Sotheron

Major wins
- St. Leger Stakes (1777)

Bourbon (foaled in 1774) was a British Thoroughbred racehorse that won the 1777 running of a race that would later be called the St. Leger Stakes.

== Background ==
Bourbon was foaled in 1774 at the farm of his breeder Mr. Sotheron at Darrington near Pontefract, Yorkshire. The Sotherons were an old family based at Darrington Hall in Darrington, West Yorkshire. Bourbon was sired by Le Sang, a successful racehorse that stood near Catterick, Yorkshire at the same stud as Matchem until his death in 1778. Le Sang was not a widely utilized stallion but he did produce several good runners such as Orpheus and Duchefs. Bourbon's dam, Queen Elizabeth, was also bred by Sotheron and had won four races run over long distances with multiple heats during her racing career. Bourbon was her first of a total of three live foals produced for Mr. Sotheron. Bourbon's maternal family (Family 37) is relatively obscure but did also produce the multiple stakes winner Dr. Syntax.

== Racing career ==
Bourbon was not officially named until September 1778 and for the first part of his racing career, including the St. Leger win, was known as Mr. Sotheron's b.c. by Le Sang. Bourbon does not appear as a sire in the General Stud Book compiled by the Weatherby family in the early nineteenth century.

=== 1777: three-year-old season ===
In the first start of his career at Hunmanby, Yorkshire on 13 May 1777, Mr. Sotheron's bay colt by Le Sang was second to a filly sired by Turk for a subscription race. On 23 September 1777 at Doncaster, Bourbon won a two-mile subscription race that would later be called the St. Leger Stakes. Running in a field of 10 horses, most of which were not formally named, and ridden by "Jockey John" Cade, Bourbon beat Mr. Hunloke's Le Sang filly and Sir Harpur's Snap filly.

=== 1778: four-year-old season ===
Still referred to as Mr. Sotheron's "colt by Le Sang", he was second to the colt Little Askham for a subscription race run on 26 May at Hunmanby. Officially named Bourbon by September of that year, Bourbon finished third in a £50 race run over a series of four two-mile heats over the Doncaster course against five other horses. He was last in the first heat, first in the second and third for the remaining heats, the race won by Sir Dundas' colt Antonio by Squirrel. At Boroughbridge on 7 October, Bourbon won a £50 race run over a series of three two-mile heats, finishing last in the first heat but recovering to win the deciding heats. A few weeks later at New Malton, Yorkshire, Bourbon was third to Orpheus (also sired by Le Sang) and Macheath in another race over three two-mile heats, finishing fifth in the first heat and third in the remaining heats.

=== 1779: five-year-old season ===
At Hunmanby on 18 May, Bourbon was fourth and last in a four-mile £50 race that was won by Mr. Bethell's Magnum Bonum. At York in August, Bourbon forfeited a match race against Lord Rockingham's horse Sextus Pompeius. In his last race of the season at Boroughbridge, he finished second to Mr. Radcliffe's Young Lofty in a series of two four-mile heats, finishing last in the first and second in the final heat.

== Pedigree ==
Pedigree of Bourbon (GB), Bay Horse, 1774
Sire Le Sang Bay, 1759	Changeling; 1747	Cade	Godolphin Arabian*
Sire Le Sang Bay, 1759	Changeling; 1747	Cade	Roxana
Sire Le Sang Bay, 1759	Changeling; 1747	Sister 2 to Miss Partner	Partner
Sire Le Sang Bay, 1759	Changeling; 1747	Sister 2 to Miss Partner	Brown Farewell
Sire Le Sang Bay, 1759	Duchess; 1748	Portmores Whitenose	Godolphin Arabian*
Sire Le Sang Bay, 1759	Duchess; 1748	Portmores Whitenose	Sister to Blaze
Sire Le Sang Bay, 1759	Duchess; 1748	Miss Slamerkin	Young True Blue
Sire Le Sang Bay, 1759	Duchess; 1748	Miss Slamerkin	Oxford Dun Arabian mare
Dam Queen Elizabeth Bay, 1763	Regulus; 1739	Godolphin Arabian*	(unknown)
Dam Queen Elizabeth Bay, 1763	Regulus; 1739	Godolphin Arabian*	(unknown)
Dam Queen Elizabeth Bay, 1763	Regulus; 1739	Grey Robinson	Bald Galloway
Dam Queen Elizabeth Bay, 1763	Regulus; 1739	Grey Robinson	Sister to Old Country Wench
Dam Queen Elizabeth Bay, 1763	Cullen Arabian mare	Cullen Arabian	(unknown)
Dam Queen Elizabeth Bay, 1763	Cullen Arabian mare	Cullen Arabian	(unknown)
Dam Queen Elizabeth Bay, 1763	Cullen Arabian mare	Almanzor mare	Almanzor
Dam Queen Elizabeth Bay, 1763	Cullen Arabian mare	Almanzor mare	Sister to Bay Bolton (Family 37)

* Bourbon is inbred 4S x 4S x 3D to the stallion Godolphin Arabian, meaning that he appears twice fourth generation on the sire side of his pedigree and once third generation on the dam side of his pedigree.
