= Gimcrack =

British Thoroughbred racehorse

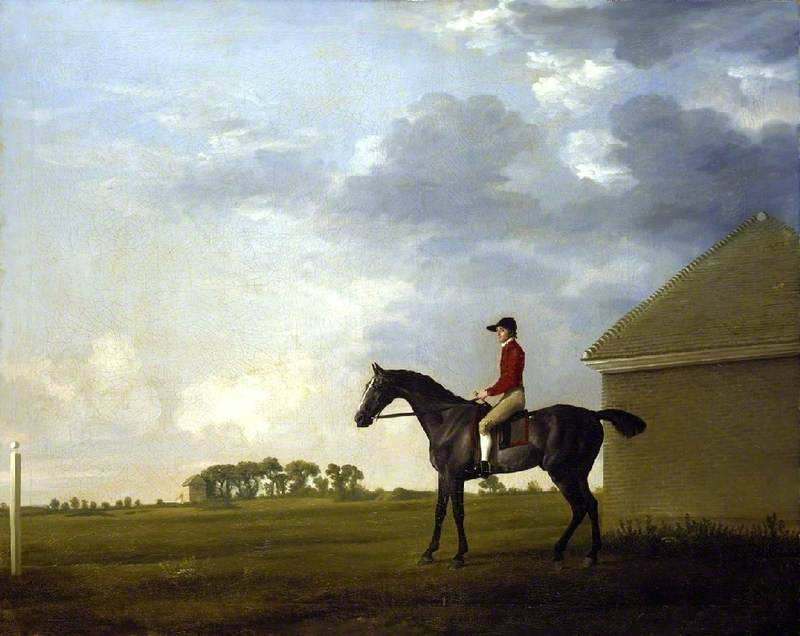
- Gimcrack on Newmarket Heath, with John Pratt. (George Stubbs, 1765)
- Sire: Cripple
- Grandsire: Godolphin Arabian
- Dam: Miss Elliott
- Damsire: Grisewood's Partner
- Sex: Stallion
- Foaled: 1760
- Country: Great Britain
- Color: Grey
- Breeder: Gideon Elliot
- Owner: Frederick St John, 2nd Viscount Bolingbroke; Sir Charles Bunbury, 6th Baronet; Richard Grosvenor, 1st Earl Grosvenor
- Record: 36: 27-?-?

Gimcrack (1760 – after 1777) was an English thoroughbred racehorse.

== Background ==
Gimcrack was a small gray Thoroughbred, standing at 14.2 hands (58 inches, 147 cm) and sired by Cripple, a son of the Godolphin Arabian; his dam, Miss Elliot, was by (Grisewood's) Partner. Lady Sarah Lennox wrote of Gimcrack in a letter dated 12 July 1765:

There was a meeting of two days at Newmarket this time of year, to see the sweetest little horse run that ever was; his name is Gimcrack, he is delightful. Lord Rockingham, the Duke of Grafton, and General Conway kissed hands the day Gimcrack ran. I must say I was more anxious about the horse than the Ministry.

== Racing career ==
Despite his small stature, Gimcrack was widely successful, winning 27 of his 36 races in a turf career spanning 7 seasons. His ownership changed hands a few times, being owned by Frederick St John, 2nd Viscount Bolingbroke before being resold to Sir Charles Bunbury, 6th Baronet, who owned Gimcrack from 1768 to 1769. He was resold again to Richard Grosvenor, 1st Earl Grosvenor, as Bunbury was unhappy with Gimcrack's racing performance later in his career.

Gimcrack won his last race in 1771, at age 11, and he retired to the Grosvenor stud.

== Stud record ==
Gimcrack sired the handy grey horse, Grey Robin, who defeated Pot-8-os. His bloodline was more notable though in U.S. horse racing than in Britain, via his son, Medley.

After his death, he was buried at Haughton Hall in Shifnal, Shropshire. A brick and stone pillar marks his grave to the west of the old walled garden.

== Legacy ==
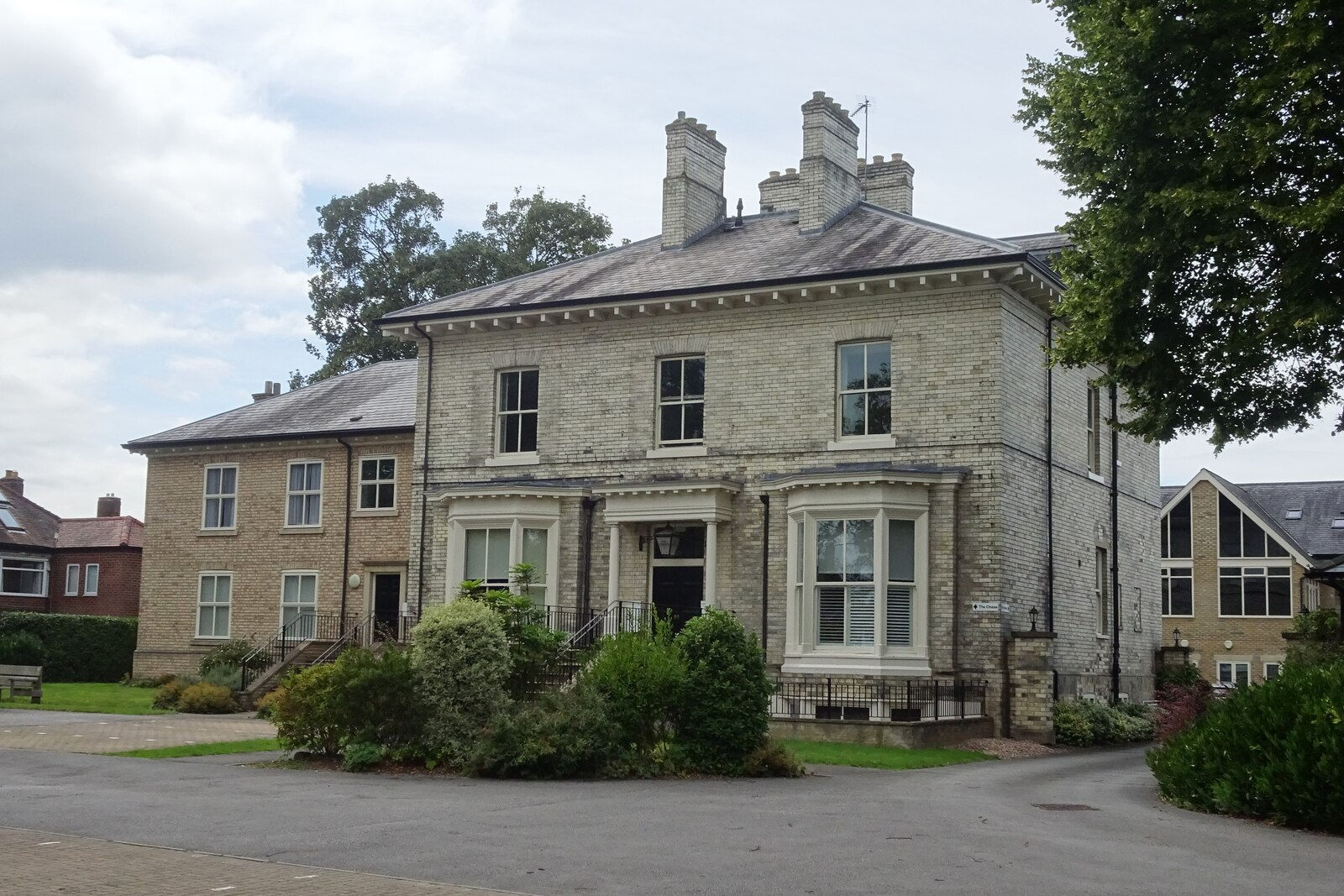
The building which housed The Gimcrack pub

Gimcrack is best known from the paintings of George Stubbs.

The Gimcrack Club, in York was founded in 1766 in his honour, and the Gimcrack Stakes, also at York, is therefore also named after the horse. Between 1936 and 2002, the horse was the namesake of The Gimcrack pub on York's Fulford Road.

== Sire line tree ==
- Gimcrack
  - Grey Robin
  - Medley
    - Gimcrack
    - Young Medley
    - Bellair II
    - Grey Diomed
    - Lamplighter
    - Quicksilver
    - Boxer
      - Mendoza
        - Wild Medley
    - Grey Medley
    - Melzar
    - Alfred
