= Cade (horse) =

British Thoroughbred sire

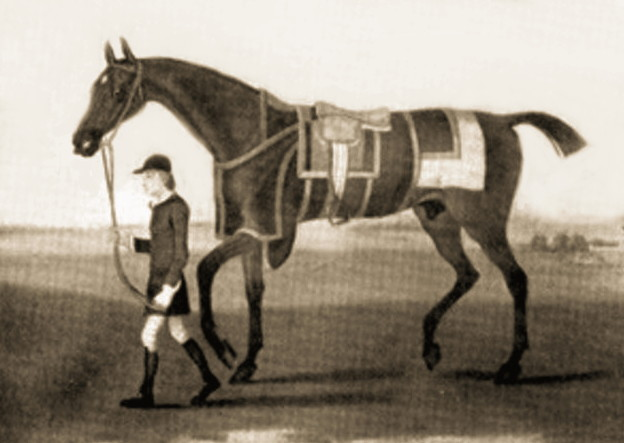
- Sire: Godolphin Arabian
- Dam: Roxana
- Damsire: Bald Galloway
- Sex: Stallion
- Foaled: 1734
- Country: Great Britain
- Colour: Bay
- Breeder: Francis Godolphin, 2nd Earl of Godolphin
- Owner: Francis Godolphin, 2nd Earl of Godolphin; Thomas Meredith of Easby

Awards
- Leading sire in Great Britain and Ireland (1752, 1753, 1758, 1759, 1760)
- Last updated on 19 July 2011

Cade (1734–1756) was an important foundation sire of Thoroughbred racehorses. He was the leading sire in Great Britain and Ireland in 1752, 1753, 1758, 1759 and 1760.

== Breeding ==
Bred by Francis Godolphin, 2nd Earl of Godolphin, he was by the Thoroughbred foundation sire, the Godolphin Arabian. Out of Roxana (1718) (by Bald Galloway), he was a full-brother to the first son of the Goldophin Arabian, Lath (1732 bay colt). Orphaned by Roxana when he was 10 days old, he was raised on cows' milk.

== Racing career ==
In 1740, he defeated Sedbury (1734 chestnut colt by Partner), Elephant and Blacksilver to win the King's Plate. The following year, in April, he finished second to Sedbury in the King's Plate, defeating Countess and Elephant. He then ran second in a £50 race in July 1744 to Molorro (bl. c. 1736). Cade was then sold to Thomas Meredith of Easby in 1745, for whom he ran third in a 50 guineas purse to Bucephalus (ch.g. 1738) and Starling.

== Stud record ==
Cade was more successful as a stallion than a racehorse, becoming Leading Sire in England in 1752, 1753, 1758, 1759 and 1760. His top offspring included:

- Cade Mare: 1751 grey filly, dam of Mambrino (horse), also 19th dam of Alysheba
- Changeling: 1747 bay colt, full-brother to Matchem, sired Le Sang
- Kitty Fisher: 1756 grey filly, sent to the USA, in the pedigree of Boston
- Matchem: three-time leading sire, one of three sire-lines to producing modern Thoroughbreds
- Silvio: 1754 bay colt, winner of the 1764 Richmond Gold Cup
- Warrens Sportsman: 1753 bay colt, damsire of Potoooooooo and the Derby winner Sir Thomas.
- Wildair: 1753 bay colt, sent to the USA, eventually taken back to England
- Young Cade: 1747 bay colt, unraced but an important sire

Cade died at Easby Abbey, in September 1756.

== Sire line tree ==
- Cade
  - Bandy
  - Changeling
    - Le Sang
      - Bourbon
      - Orpheus
      - Miracle
  - Trunnion
  - Young Cade
    - Dove
    - Julius Caesar
    - Tanner
    - Royal George
    - Drone
    - Cadmus
  - Martin
  - Matchem
    - Turf
      - Crop
        - Lop
      - Acacia
    - Dux
      - Yellow Jack
        - Jacks Maidenhead
    - Conductor
      - Imperator
        - Pipator
      - Trumpator
        - Paynator
        - Didelot
        - Sorcerer
        - Governor
      - Harpator
    - Pantaloon
      - Buffer
      - Harry Rowe
      - John Doe
    - North Star
      - North Star
    - Johnny
    - Pumpkin
      - Young Pumpkin
    - Alfred
      - Doctor
      - Guyler
      - Shipton
      - Tickle Toby
    - Protector
    - Dictator
    - Magnum Bonum
      - Rattler
        - Rattler
    - Magog
      - Forester
  - Hero
    - Friar
    - Adonis
  - Sportsman
  - Wildair
    - Bashaw
    - Wildair (Church)
      - Diamond
    - Telemachus
    - Tommy
  - Belford
  - Northumberland
    - Ragamuffin
    - Teucer
    - Young Northumberland
  - Silvio
  - Brother to Silvio
  - Sprightly
    - Pyrrhus
      - Edgar
      - Sysyfus
  - Pangloss
  - Boreas
