= Bald Galloway =

British Thoroughbred sire

- Sire: St. Victor's Barb
- Dam: Grey Whynot
- Damsire: Whynot
- Sex: Stallion
- Foaled: c.1705
- Country: Great Britain
- Colour: Chestnut
- Breeder: Captain Rider

Awards
- Leading sire in Great Britain and Ireland (1725)

Bald Galloway (foaled c.1705) was a leading Thoroughbred sire in the 18th century. He was foaled in about 1705 and was bred by Captain Rider. He was sired by St. Victor's Barb and his dam was Grey Whynot, a daughter of Whynot. Grey Whynot's dam was a Royal mare. Bald Galloway was leading Leading sire in Great Britain and Ireland in 1725. His best racing son was Buckhunter, who won Queen Anne's Gold Cup at York in 1719 and several King's Plates.

He also sired Bald Ovington, Cartouch, Daffodil, Dart, Foxhunter, Grey Ovington, Grey Robinson, Roxana, Silverlocks and Snake. Roxana was the dam of Lath and multiple champion sire Cade. Grey Robinson was the dam of the undefeated Regulus. He was a chestnut horse and stood at the Oak-Tree, Leeming-lane in Yorkshire.

== Sire line tree ==
- Bald Galloway
  - Buckhunter
  - Cartouch
    - Young Cartouch
      - Captain
        - Whirligig
  - Foxhunter
    - Moses
      - Pharaoh
      - Otho
        - Dorimant
