= Godolphin Arabian =

Foundation sire of the Thoroughbred horse breed (c. 1724–1753)

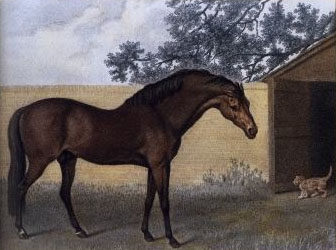
- The Godolphin Arabian, by George Stubbs, after David Morier
- Sex: Stallion
- Foaled: c. 1724
- Died: 25 December 1753; Gog Magog Hills, Cambridgeshire, England
- Colour: Bay
- Owner: Francis Godolphin, 2nd Earl of Godolphin

Honours
- Leading sire in Great Britain and Ireland (1738, 1745, 1747)

The Godolphin Arabian (c. 1724–1753), also known as the Godolphin Barb, was an Arabian horse who was one of three stallions that founded the modern Thoroughbred (the others were the Darley Arabian and the Byerley Turk). He was named after his best-known owner, Francis Godolphin, 2nd Earl of Godolphin.

== Origins ==
The Godolphin Arabian was foaled about 1724, possibly in Yemen and moved several times before reaching England. At some early age, he was exported, probably via Syria, to the stud of the bey of Tunis. From there he was given to Louis XV of France in 1730. It is believed he was a present from monarch to monarch. Not valued by his new French owner, it is believed he was used as a carthorse.

The horse was then imported from France by Edward Coke and sent to his stud at Longford Hall, Derbyshire, where he remained until the death of his owner in 1733.

He was bequeathed to Roger Williams, "proprietor of the St. James's Coffee House", who inherited Coke's stallions. He was bought by the 2nd Earl of Godolphin, and placed at his stud at Wandlebury, Cambridgeshire, until his death on Christmas Day 1753. A stone marks his grave under the archway of the stable block of Wandlebury House.

== Appearance ==
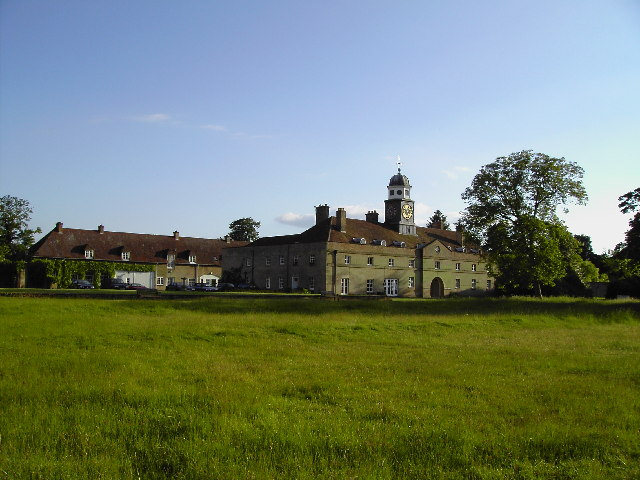
The stable block of Wandlebury House where the horse was buried

The Godolphin Arabian was a bay colour with some white on the off heel behind. He stood at 15 hands (60 inches, 152 cm) and was distinguished by an unnaturally high crest, which is noticeable from portraits of the horse. Most of his immediate offspring were also bay.

The veterinary surgeon Osmer described the Godolphin Arabian in the following manner,

There never was a horse… so well entitled to get racers as the Godolphin Arabian…his shoulders were deeper, and lay farther into his back, than those of any horse yet seen. Behind the shoulders, there was but a very small space where the muscles of his loins rose exceedingly high, broad, and expanded, which were inserted into his quarters with greater strength and power than in any horse . . . yet seen.

== Breed controversy ==
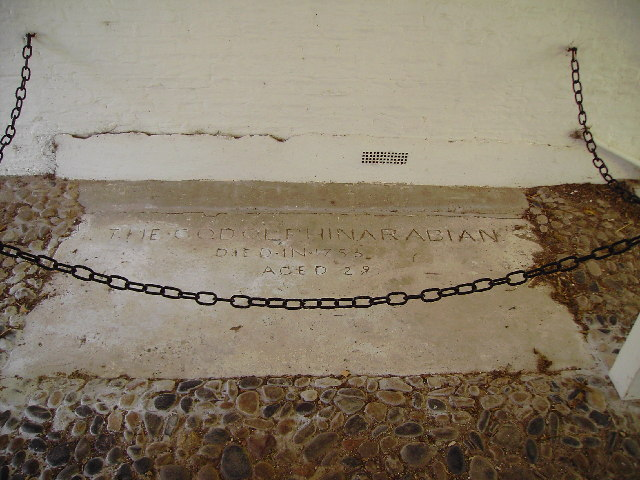
The Godolphin Arabian was buried within the stable block at Wandlebury in 1753 at the age of 29.

Controversy exists over the ancestry of this horse; some writers referred to him as a Barb, but Judith Blunt-Lytton, 16th Baroness Wentworth of the Crabbet Arabian Stud concludes that it is most widely believed that he was an Arabian or had primarily Arabian lineage.

"Barb" is a reference to his believed country of origin, Tunisia, on the Barbary Coast. Whyte in the 1840 History of the British Turf, refers to the horse as "The Godolphin Barb, or as he has been improperly called, the Godolphin Arabian" (emphasis added) before further clarifying, "he was long considered an Arabian, although his points resembled more those of the highest breed of Barbs." However, portraits showing a horse with a high-carried tail and dished profile, features that differentiate the two types, lead modern experts to believe he was more likely an Arabian. The confusion is understandable, but while the breeds have some characteristics in common and are distantly related, their phenotypes are quite distinct. There was also an argument raised that he was actually a Turkoman horse, merely called an Arabian in order to raise the stud fee.

The Earl of Godolphin referred to the horse as an Arabian, and he was described as such by the painter George Stubbs. Lord Godolphin later bought a second stallion in 1750. This one he clearly called a "barb". Both were of a similar bay colour, but the Barb had a star. Godolphin later bought a grey Barb, which has also caused some confusion over the years.

Recent DNA studies disprove the theory that he was a Barb, as his descendants' Y-DNA traces to the same general haplotype as the Darley Arabian, though to different sub-groups and there are relatively few male-line descendants of the Godolphin Arabian today. This group may have been of Turkoman horse or Arabian origins, as modern horses of both breeds have been linked to this haplotype.

== Breeding career ==
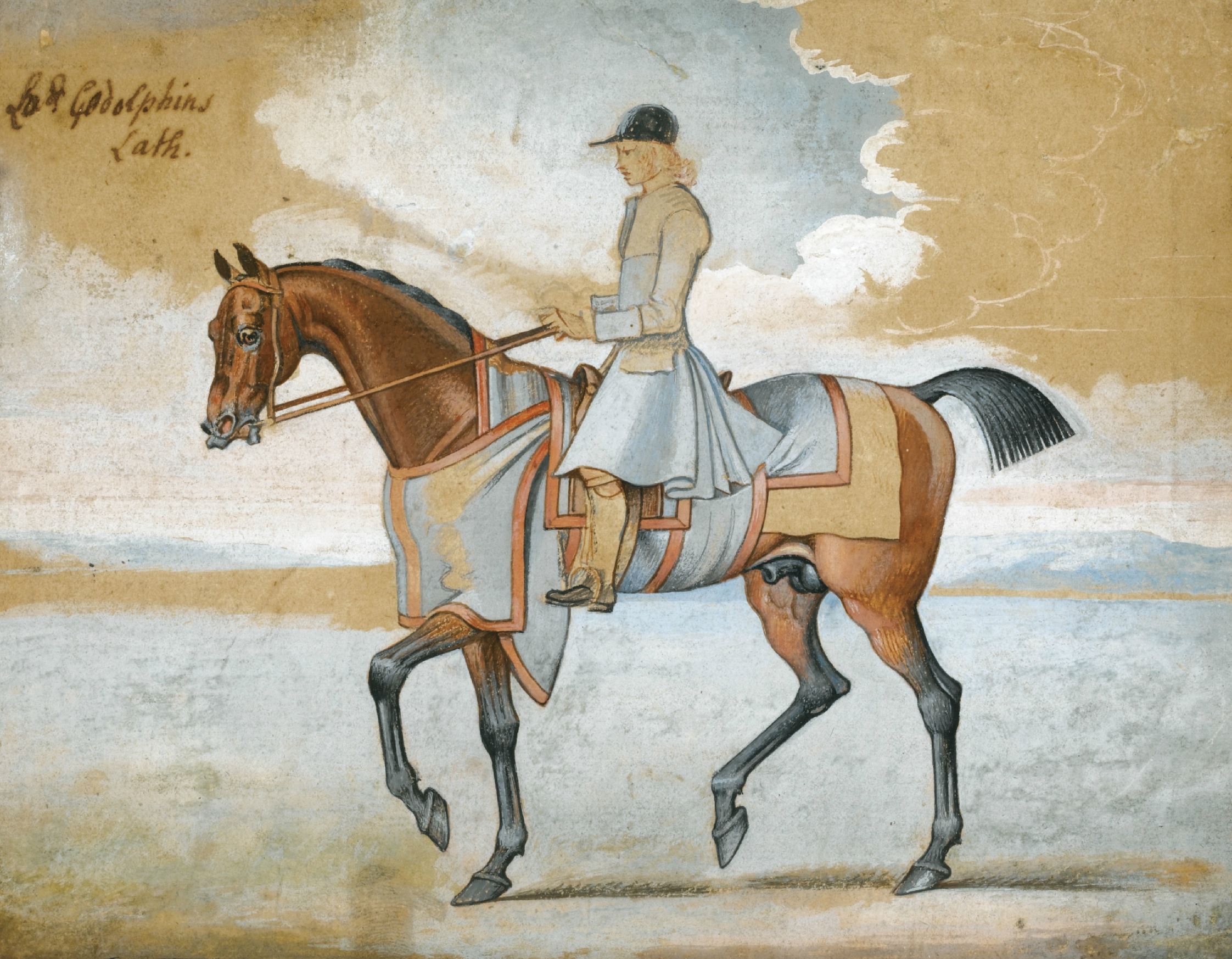
Lord Godolphin's Lath (by James Seymour)

The Godolphin Arabian was the leading sire in Great Britain and Ireland in 1738, 1745 and 1747.

Originally, this small stallion was considered inferior to the larger European horses of the time and was not meant to be put to stud. Instead he was used as 'teaser', a stallion used to gauge the mare's receptiveness. This changed when Hobgoblin refused to cover the mare Roxana, who was then covered by the Godolphin Arabian.

The result of this mating was Lath, the first of his offspring, who went on to win the Queen's Plate nine times out of nine at the Newmarket races. The second colt from this pair was Cade, and the third was Regulus. All three were the same gold-touched bay as their sire, with the same small build and high-crested conformation. All were exceptionally fast on the track, and went on to sire many foals themselves. This was the start of the Godolphin Arabian's prowess as a racing stud, and he spent the rest of his days as the Earl of Godolphin's prize stallion, bred to England's finest mares.

Unlike many influential foundation stallions whose impact declined after only a few generations, the Godolphin Arabian established several enduring bloodlines through sons such as Cade and Regulus. Although his direct male line has become comparatively rare, his genetic influence remains widespread in the maternal pedigrees of modern Thoroughbreds, making him one of the most significant foundation sires in the breed's development.

The American connection began with the filly Selima (born in 1745 out of Shireborn). She was purchased by Benjamin Tasker Jr. of the Province of Maryland in Colonial America, carried to the new world, and raced between 1750 and 1753. She won the biggest prize of the era, 2,500 pistoles at Gloucester, Virginia which marked "the beginning of the remarkable racing contests between the rival colonies of Maryland and Virginia." After this, she became a successful broodmare at the Belair Stud in Collington, Maryland.

The Godolphin Arabian died on the Gog Magog Hills, Cambridgeshire in 1753, aged around 29. The horse's grave in the stable block of Wandlebury House can be visited. When he was interred, the occasion was marked with ale and cake.

== Legacy ==
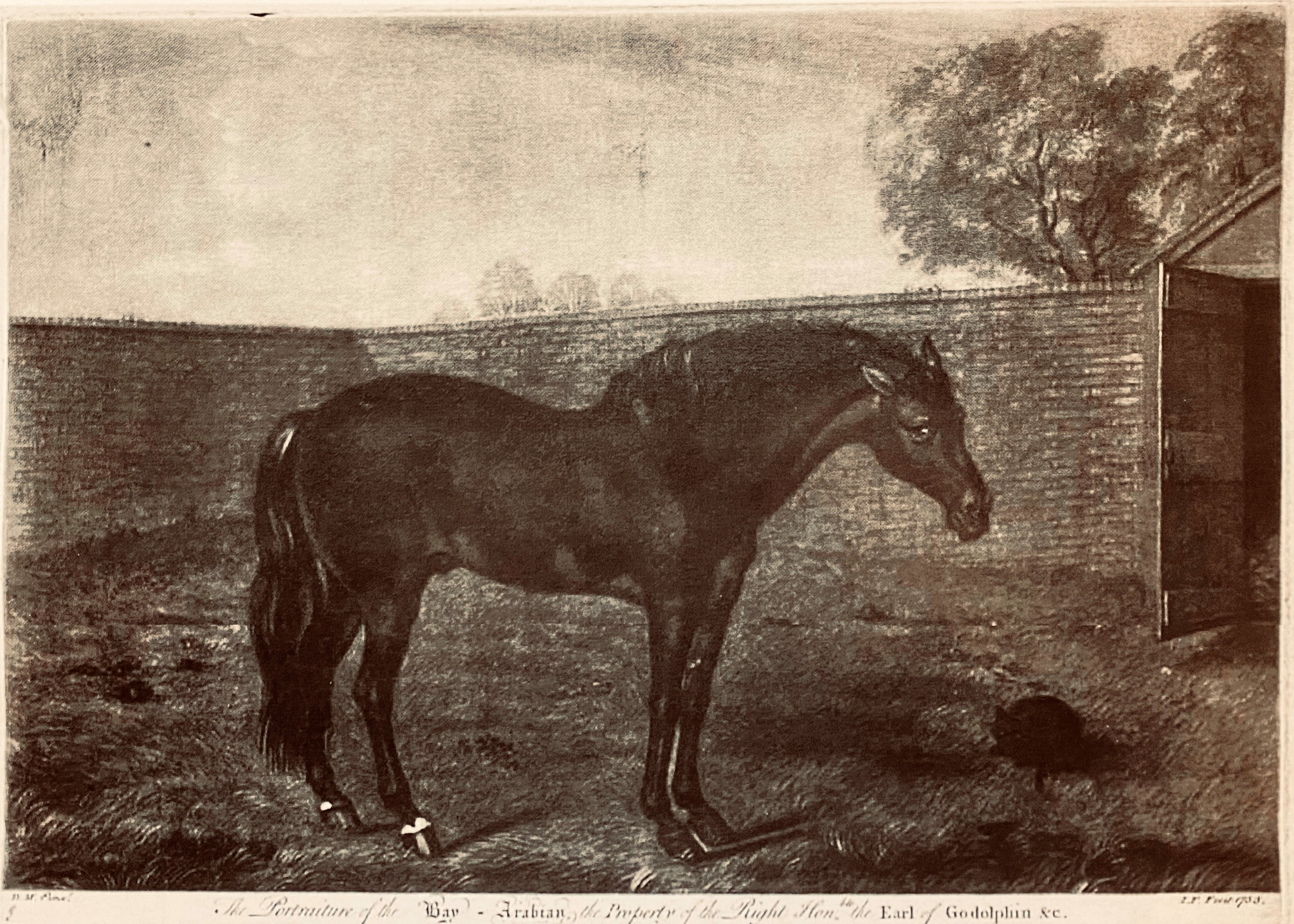
The Godolphin Arabian and the cat Grimalkin, engraved by John Faber the Younger in 1753, after David Morier (initials of the artists).

Although today the majority of Thoroughbred horses' sire lines trace to the Darley Arabian, several famous North American horses of the past trace their sire line back to the Godolphin Arabian. These include Seabiscuit, Man o' War, and War Admiral. Today, the sire line is primarily supported by descendants of Relaunch and his son Cee's Tizzy through dual Breeders' Cup Classic winner Tiznow.

In Europe, his influence survives mainly through the 2,000 Guineas winner Known Fact, and his son, the champion miler Warning. This line has produced outstanding sprinters such as Diktat (Haydock Sprint Cup), Avonbridge, Dream Ahead, and Calstone Light O. The Derby has not been won by a sire line descendant of the Godolphin Arabian since Santa Claus in 1964 and is nowadays dominated by descendants of the Darley Arabian.

The major Thoroughbred sire Eclipse traces in his sire line to the Darley Arabian, but his dam was a daughter of Regulus and thus also traces to the Godolphin Arabian. This pattern continues to be seen today, with the Godolphin Arabian more heavily represented in dam lines and in the "middle" of pedigrees (as opposed to direct sire lines).

Conquérant, a founding stallion of the French Trotter breed, also belonged to the male lineage of the Godolphin Arabian.

== In fiction ==
King of the Wind (Chicago: Rand McNally, 1948) is a fictional biography of the Godolphin Arabian by American author Marguerite Henry. She wrote many books about horses for children, and perhaps is best known for Misty of Chincoteague and its sequels. She won the Newbery Medal for King of the Wind, recognizing it as the year's "most distinguished contribution to American literature for children". Misty became a film in 1961, but King of the Wind had to wait till 1990 for its adaptation, with Navin Chowdhry as the Arabian's lifetime stable boy Agba.

In the novel, the Godolphin Arabian was foaled in Morocco and was called Sham. He came to Europe as a diplomatic gift to King Louis XV but, due to his poor condition on arrival and relatively small size, was given to the cook as a cart horse. He was soon sold to a woodcarter in Paris, where he was treated poorly and then purchased by the Quaker Edward Coke of Holkham Hall, older brother of the 1st Earl of Leicester 5th Creation, then sold to Francis, Earl of Godolphin, who maintained a stud in Suffolk, near the racing town of Newmarket.

An anthropomorphized version of the horse using the Godolphin Barb name appears in Umamusume: Pretty Derby, voiced by Satomi Satō, alongside the Darley Arabian and the Byerley Turk.

== Sire line tree ==
Descendants of the Godolphin Arabian (click to expand)
- Godolphin Arabian
  - Lath
    - Red Cap
    - Hector
  - Dismal
  - Cade
    - Bandy
    - Changeling
      - Le Sang
        - Bourbon
        - Orpheus
        - Miracle
    - Trunnion
    - Young Cade
      - Dove
      - Julius Caesar
      - Tanner
      - Royal George
      - Drone
      - Cadmus
    - Martin
    - Matchem
      - Turf
        - Crop
        - Acacia
      - Dux
        - Yellow Jack
      - Conductor
        - Imperator
        - Trumpator
        - Harpator
      - Pantaloon
        - Buffer
        - Harry Rowe
        - John Doe
      - North Star
        - North Star
      - Johnny
      - Pumpkin
        - Young Pumpkin
      - Alfred
        - Doctor
        - Guyler
        - Shipton
        - Tickle Toby
      - Protector
      - Dictator
      - Magnum Bonum
        - Rattler
      - Magog
        - Forester
    - Hero
      - Friar
      - Adonis
    - Sportsman
    - Wildair
      - Bashaw
      - Wildair (Church)
        - Diamond
      - Telemachus
      - Tommy
    - Belford
    - Northumberland
      - Ragamuffin
      - Teucer
      - Young Northumberland
    - Silvio
    - Brother to Silvio
    - Sprightly
      - Pyrrhus
        - Edgar
        - Sysyfus
    - Pangloss
    - Boreas
  - Mogul
    - Jolly Roger
    - Young Mogul
    - Whistlejacket
      - Coriolanus
      - Roscius
  - Brother to Whitenose
    - Whittington
  - Marlborough
  - Babraham
    - Aimwell
    - Hob-Or-Nob
    - Juniper
    - Alcides
      - Gander
      - Remnant
      - Constantine
    - Atlas
    - Genius
    - Bosphorus
    - Babraham Blank
      - Don Carlos
      - Bay Richmond
      - Hazard
      - Carbuncle
    - Shadow
    - Cardinal Puff
      - Cardinal Puff
    - Young Babraham
      - Mask
  - Dormouse
    - Damon
    - Dormouse
    - Valiant
    - Dorimond
  - Janus
    - Little Janus
      - Peacock
      - Spadille
      - Babram
      - Buie
      - Meades Celer
      - Turpins Fleetwood
        - Printer
      - Twigg
    - Coomb
  - Regulus
    - Brutus
      - Babraham
      - Adolphus
      - Havannah
      - Noble
      - Partner
    - Cato
    - Royal
    - Adolphus
    - Silvereye
    - South
      - Confederate
      - Friar
      - South West
      - South East
      - Magog
      - Cormorant
      - Amazon
      - Laycock
      - Flimnap
    - Careless
      - Regulator
      - Mousetrap
      - Alderman
    - Jolly Roger
    - Fearnought
      - Regulus
      - King Herod
      - Fearnought
      - Eclipse
      - Goldfinder
        - Flag of Truce
      - Independence
      - Matchless
      - Wildair
        - Highflier
        - Commutation
        - Chanticleer
      - Whynot
    - Dragon
    - Vampire
    - Jalap
      - Achilles
    - Ascham
    - Star
    - Prophet
      - Soothsayer
      - Goldsmith
      - Trifle
    - Doge
      - Venetian
        - Maryland Phoenix
      - Young Sir Peter
    - Morwick Ball
      - Icelander
      - Young Morwick
        - Gustavus
        - Curanto
      - Parlington
      - Doctor Nim
      - No-no
      - Pellegrine
    - Turk
    - Bucephalus
  - Bajazet
    - Bajazet
    - Selim
  - Blank
    - Contest
    - Tatler
    - Foxhunter
    - Manby
    - Antinous
      - Lamplighter
      - Givens
    - Centinel
    - Fallower
    - Granby
    - Chatsworth
    - Chrysolite
    - Pacolet
      - Citizen
        - Pacolet
    - Hyder Alley
    - Paymaster
      - Paragon
      - Highlander (Brown)
      - Young Paymaster
        - King William
      - Paymaster
        - Rodney
    - Lycurgus
    - Ancaster
  - Gower Stallion
    - Sweepstakes
      - Trentham
        - Driver
        - Grey Trentham
    - David
    - Mealey Eyes
    - Jolly Roger
  - Marksman
  - Old England
    - Brutus
    - Northumberland
    - Amaranthus
  - Skewball
  - Buffcoat
    - Whitefoot
    - Buffcoat
    - Creampot
    - Turf
  - Whitenose
    - Aaron
    - Victorious
    - Wasp
    - Pegasus
    - Rake
  - Dimple
  - Tarquin
    - Tarquin
  - Infant
  - Coalition Colt
    - Champion
    - Irish Hero
  - Mizra
  - Cripple
    - Gimcrack
      - Grey Robin
      - Medley
        - Randolph's Gimcrack
        - Young Medley
        - Bellair II
        - Grey Diomed
        - Lamplighter
        - Quicksilver
        - Boxer
        - Grey Medley
        - Melzar
        - Alfred
    - Tantrum
      - Sampson
  - Cygnet
  - Feather
  - Godolphin Colt
  - Lofty
    - Slim
    - Chance
    - Honest Harry
  - Matchless
  - Omar
  - Sprightly
    - Pyrrhus
      - Edgar
      - Sisyfus

== See also ==
- Foundation bloodstock
- List of racehorses
- Kentucky Derby winners descended from the Godolphin Arabian
