= Selima (horse) =

British Thoroughbred racehorse

- Sire: Godolphin Arabian
- Dam: Shireborn
- Damsire: Hobgoblin
- Sex: Mare
- Foaled: 30 April 1745
- Country: Great Britain
- Colour: Bay
- Owner: Benjamin Tasker, Jr.
- Earnings: 2,500 pistoles

Honours
- Selima Stakes at Laurel Park Racecourse
- Last updated on 27 August 2023

Selima (b. 30 April 1745) was one of the most important Thoroughbred horses of the 18th century and became one of the foundation mares of the American Thoroughbred. She was imported to Maryland between 1750 and 1752 by Benjamin Tasker, Jr.

== History ==
Selima was foaled on 30 April 1745 at the stud farm of Francis Godolphin, 2nd Earl of Godolphin in England. She was sired by the Godolphin Arabian out of the "Shireborn Mare", by the stallion Hobgoblin. Shireborn reportedly came from the royal stables of the Stuart monarch Anne, Queen of Great Britain.

A bay mare with a faint white star on her forehead, and a splash of white on her left hind ankle, Selima was among the first Thoroughbreds to cross the Atlantic Ocean and race in the American colonies. She was imported by Benjamin Tasker, Jr. of Maryland around September 1750, at the age of 5, and was supposedly pregnant when she was shipped across the Atlantic, according to the Earl of Godolphin's studbook. However, no foal was produced, meaning that Selima likely miscarried.

However, John L. Hervey, the author of Racing in America 1665-1865 (1944), disputes this:

"[The] precise age and maternal pedigree [of Selima], despite these things, were matters of uncertainty and dispute until but yesterday. At various times four different dams, all wrong, were assigned her by different authorities. Precisely when she arrived in Maryland, precisely how old she then was – these likewise were facts fruitful of misstatement. Not until 1933 did the late C. M. Prior, that indefatigable investigator of old English Thoroughbred history, set them at rest. Having turned up the original manuscript stud books kept by Edward Coke, the man who brought the Godolphin Arabian into England from France, and by the Earl of Godolphin, to whom the horse passed after Coke's death and whose property he remained throughout the rest of his (the stallion's) life, Mr. Prior discovered in them the authentic entry of her foaling upon April 30, 1745; that her dam was the Shireborn Mare, by Hobgoblin and of the maternal family stemming from Queen Anne's Moonah Barb Mare; and that she was a bay 'with a Small Star & a Little of ye near hind Heell white'. The notation following: 'This Filly sold to Mr. Tasker into Maryland', with the further statement that she was sent there in September, 1750, being plenary verification of her origin and ancestry."

— John L. Hervey, Racing in America 1665-1865 (1944)

Selima was trained to race at Belair in 1751 and 1752, and she made her racing debut was in Annapolis, Maryland in May 1752. There, she defeated another English mare, Creeping Kate, winning 40 pounds, or about 50 pistoles.

In 1752, Selima won the biggest prize of the era, 2,500 pistoles at Gloucester, Virginia which marked "the beginning of the remarkable racing contests between the rival colonies of Maryland and Virginia", according to former Annapolis mayor Ellen Moyer. Selima won, followed by Tryal (Trial) - William Byrd III's gray mare - followed by two imported (c. 1751) English Thoroughbred horses also owned by the Tayloes, Jenny Cameron and Childers, with Childers later becoming a popular broodmare sire.

== Legacy ==
Selima produced many foals during her career as a broodmare:

- 1755 - Ariel, a stallion by Morton's Traveller (1746, by Partner out of Bay Bloody Buttocks, by Bloody Buttocks)
- 1756 - Partner II, a stallion by Morton's Traveller (1746, by Partner out of Bay Bloody Buttocks, by Bloody Buttocks)
- 1757 - "Leonidas' Dam", a mare by Morton's Traveller (1746, by Partner out of Bay Bloody Buttocks, by Bloody Buttocks)
- 1758 - Stella, a mare by Othello (1743, by Crab, by Alcock's Arabian, out of Miss Slamerkin, by Honywood's Arabian)
- 1759 - Galloway's Selim, a stallion by Othello (1743, by Crab, by Alcock's Arabian, out of Miss Slamerkin, by Honywood's Arabian)
- 1760 - Ebony, a mare by Othello (1743, by Crab, by Alcock's Arabian, out of Miss Slamerkin, by Honywood's Arabian)
- 1762 - Wilkins Spadille, a stallion by Janus II (1746, also a grandson of the Godolphin Arabian by Janus I)
- 1763 - Little Juniper, a stallion by Juniper (1752, also a grandson of the Godolphin Arabian by Babraham)
- 1765 - Black Selima, a mare by Fearnought (1755, also a grandson of the Godolphin Arabian by Regulus)
- 176x - Camilla, a mare by Tanner (1757, also a great-grandson of the Godolphin Arabian through Cade)

However, records are conflicted on which foal she had in 1761, with two different ones being recorded:

- Bellair I (Tayloe's), a stallion by Morton's Traveller (1746, by Partner out of Bay Bloody Buttocks, by Bloody Buttocks)
- Babraham II, a stallion by Juniper (1752, also a grandson of the Godolphin Arabian by Babraham)

The annual Selima Stakes, now raced at Laurel Park Racecourse, was named after Selima in 1926 and first held at the Maryland State Fair with a $30,000 challenge cup for two-year-old fillies.

== See also ==
- Dungannon
- Maryland Jockey Club
