= Sweetbriar (horse) =

British Thoroughbred racehorse

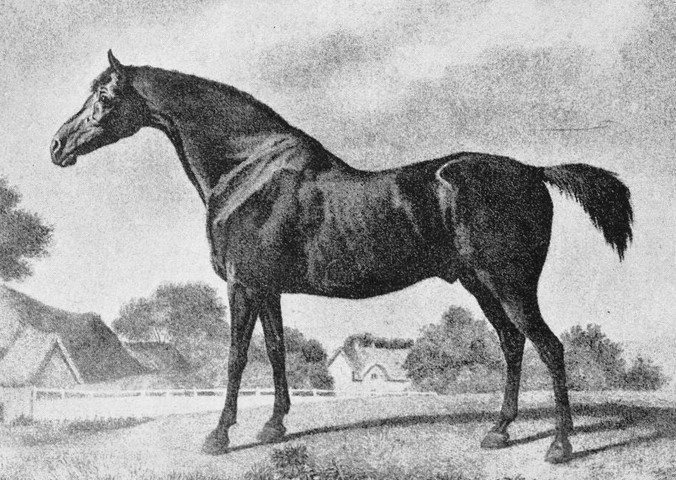
- Print of Sweetbriar from an original painting by George Stubbs
- Sire: Syphon
- Grandsire: Squirt
- Dam: Shakespeare mare
- Damsire: Shakespeare
- Sex: Stallion
- Foaled: 1769
- Country: Great Britain
- Colour: Chestnut
- Breeder: Thomas Meredith
- Owner: 1st Baron Grosvenor
- Record: 8: 8-0-0

Major wins
- Sweepstakes of 50 gs at Newmarket (1773); Match against Chalkstone (1773, 1774); Match against Firetail (1774); Newmarket Cup (1775)

Sweetbriar (foaled 1769) was a British Thoroughbred racehorse. He won all eight of the races he contested, including a match race against Craven Stakes winner Firetail. He later became a successful stallion, with his progeny including Epsom Derby winner Assassin.

== Background ==
Sweetbriar was a chestnut colt bred by Thomas Meredith and foaled in 1769. He was sired by Great Subscription Purse winner Syphon, who also sired Sweetwilliam. His dam was a daughter of Shakespeare.

== Racing career ==
Sweetbriar made his racecourse debut in October 1773 when he beat the Earl of Ossory's Chalkstone, Mr. Vernon's Milliner, Mr. Ogilvy's Consul and Lord Foley's Chesterton in a Sweepstakes of 50 guineas each at Newmarket. Chalkstone had started the 6/4 favourite, with Consul at 5/2 and Sweetbriar at 3/1. At Newmarket's second October meeting he beat Chalkstone again, this time in a match race. At the Houghton meeting he beat Mr. Ogilvy's Porsenna, after starting favourite, as he had done in his match against Chalkstone.

In the spring of 1774 he beat Chalkstone in 1000 guineas race at Newmarket. The bookmakers sent them both of as joint-favourites. He then beat Mr. Foley's Craven Stakes winner Firetail after starting as the 1/3 favourite in another 1000 guineas match race at Newmarket. In October he beat the Duke of Grafton's Lamplighter in a 140 guineas race. Two days later Sweetbriar beat Telemachus and Joquille in a Sweepstakes of 20 guineas each.

In his final start he walked over for the Newmarket Cup in October 1775 and retired unbeaten.

== Stud career ==
Sweetbriar stood as a stallion for Grosvenor and mainly covered his mares. He did meet with some success though, siring 1782 Epsom Derby winner Assassin. He was also the sire of the mares Flyer and Hare. Flyer was the dam of Rhadamanthus and Daedalus, who both won the Derby. Hare foaled Tippitywitchet, who was the dam of the top broodmare the Rubens mare.

== Sire line tree ==
- Sweetbriar
  - Chocolate
    - Cornet
  - Assassin
    - Gunpowder

== Pedigree ==
Pedigree of Sweetbriar, chestnut stallion, 1769
Sire Syphon (GB) ch. 1750	Squirt (GB) ch. 1732	Bartlett's Childers*	Darley Arabian
Sire Syphon (GB) ch. 1750	Squirt (GB) ch. 1732	Bartlett's Childers*	Betty Leedes
Sire Syphon (GB) ch. 1750	Squirt (GB) ch. 1732	Snake mare	Snake
Sire Syphon (GB) ch. 1750	Squirt (GB) ch. 1732	Snake mare	Grey Wilkes
Sire Syphon (GB) ch. 1750	Patriot mare (GB)	Bolton Patriot; 1729	Bay Bolton
Sire Syphon (GB) ch. 1750	Patriot mare (GB)	Bolton Patriot; 1729	Jigg mare
Sire Syphon (GB) ch. 1750	Patriot mare (GB)	Crab mare	Crab
Sire Syphon (GB) ch. 1750	Patriot mare (GB)	Crab mare	Bay Bolton mare
Dam Shakespeare mare (GB) b. 1763	Shakespeare (GB) ch. 1745	Hobgoblin; 1724	Aleppo
Dam Shakespeare mare (GB) b. 1763	Shakespeare (GB) ch. 1745	Hobgoblin; 1724	Son of Careless mare
Dam Shakespeare mare (GB) b. 1763	Shakespeare (GB) ch. 1745	Little Hartley Mare*	Bartlett's Childers*
Dam Shakespeare mare (GB) b. 1763	Shakespeare (GB) ch. 1745	Little Hartley Mare*	Flying Whig
Dam Shakespeare mare (GB) b. 1763	Miss Meredith (GB); 1751	Cade b. 1734	Godolphin Arabian
Dam Shakespeare mare (GB) b. 1763	Miss Meredith (GB); 1751	Cade b. 1734	Roxana
Dam Shakespeare mare (GB) b. 1763	Miss Meredith (GB); 1751	Little Hartley Mare*	Bartlett's Childers*
Dam Shakespeare mare (GB) b. 1763	Miss Meredith (GB); 1751	Little Hartley Mare*	Flying Whig

Note: b. = Bay, ch. = Chestnut

* Sweetbriar is inbred 3S x 4D × 4D to the stallion Bartlett's Childers, meaning that he appears third generation once on the sire side of his pedigree, and fourth generation twice on the dam side of his pedigree.

* Sweetbriar is inbred 4D × 4D to the mare Little Hartley Mare, meaning that she appears fourth generation twice on the dam side of his pedigree.

== See also ==
- List of leading Thoroughbred racehorses
