= Squirrel (horse) =

British Thoroughbred racehorse

- Sire: Traveller
- Grandsire: Partner
- Dam: Grey Bloody Buttocks
- Damsire: Bloody Buttocks
- Sex: Stallion
- Foaled: 1754
- Country: Great Britain
- Colour: Bay
- Breeder: William Cornforth
- Owner: Jenison Shafto
- Record: 9: 7-2-0

Major wins
- 1400 Guineas Stakes; 120 gs at Newmarket (); Match against Mystery ( Match against Spider ( Match against Dapper; Match against Jason

Squirrel was a British Thoroughbred racehorse. He won seven of his nine races, including the 1400 Guineas Stakes and match races against Dapper and Jason. He was also a successful stallion, siring Craven Stakes winner Firetail. However he was more well known for producing broodmares, siring the dams of seven Classic winners including Derby winner Noble, along with the dam of champion sire Trumpator. Squirrel was owned by Jenison Shafto.

== Background ==
Squirrel was a bay colt bred by William Cornforth and foaled in 1754. He was sired by Traveller, who won several races. As a sire he served few mares until Dainty Davy, and Squirrel himself, made it to the racecourse and turned out to be good horses. Squirrel's dam was Grey Bloody Buttocks, a daughter of Bloody Buttocks. He was sold to Jenison Shafto.

== Racing career ==
Squirrel's first race was at Huntingdon, where he finished runner-up to Mr. Swinburn's Belford. In October 1758 in the first running of the 1400 Guineas Stakes over the four-mile, one-and-a-half furlong Beacon Course at Newmarket. He won the race, where the opposition included the Earl of Northumberland's Primrose and Mr. Panton's Posthumous. Later in the same meeting he beat Kiddleston, Standby, Crab, Shock, Bosphorus, Dormouse, Perseus and Rake to win 120 guineas. He returned to the track in May 1759, when he won a 300 guineas match race against Mr. Panton's Mystery over the Beacon Course. At York he finished second to Silvo and in October at Newmarket he beat Spider in a match race for 200 guineas over the Rowley Mile.

At Newmarket in April 1760 be beat the Duke of Cumberland's Dapper over the Beacon Course for 500 guineas. In July he won the Ladies' Plate, which was run in four-mile heats, beating Juniper and Posthumous. In the spring of 1761 he easily beat Sir James Lowther's Jason in a match race of the Beacon Course worth 1000 guineas. Later in the spring he was due to face another of Lowther's horses, Barham, for another 1000 guineas match, but before the race he became lame in his fetlock and the race did not take place. He was then taken out of training and retired to stud.

== Stud career ==
Squirrel became a successful stallion and during his career at stud his progeny earned over £56,000 on the racecourse. He stood at Packenham Hall in Suffolk and his progeny included:

- Lady Bolingbroke (1766) – foaled the Oaks winner Tetotum.
- Squirrel mare (1767) – foaled the Oaks winner Ceres and the dam of Derby winners Daedalus and Rhadamanthus.
- Flora (1768) – produced the St. Leger winners Spadille and Young Flora.
- Firetail (1769) – won a number of races, including the Craven Stakes in 1773.
- Brim (1771) – foaled the 1786 Derby winner Noble.
- Brunette (1771) – was the dam of champion sire Trumpator.
- Cypher (1772) – was the dam of Oaks winner Trifle.
- Dasher (1772) – running from 1776 to 1779, he won several race at Newmarket, Chelmsford, Odiham, Epsom, Ascot Heath and Andover.
- Squirrel mare – foaled the Oaks winner Serina.

Squirrel died in 1780.

== Pedigree ==
Pedigree of Squirrel, bay stallion, 1754
Sire Traveller (GB) 1735	Partner (GB); 1718	Jigg; 1701	Byerley Turk
Sire Traveller (GB) 1735	Partner (GB); 1718	Jigg; 1701	Spanker mare
Sire Traveller (GB) 1735	Partner (GB); 1718	Sister to Mixbury	Curwen's Bay Barb
Sire Traveller (GB) 1735	Partner (GB); 1718	Sister to Mixbury	Old Spot mare
Sire Traveller (GB) 1735	Almanzor mare (GB)	Almanzor; 1713	Darley Arabian
Sire Traveller (GB) 1735	Almanzor mare (GB)	Almanzor; 1713	Old Hautboy mare
Sire Traveller (GB) 1735	Almanzor mare (GB)	Grey Hautboy mare	Grey Hautboy
Sire Traveller (GB) 1735	Almanzor mare (GB)	Grey Hautboy mare	Makeless mare
Dam Grey Bloody Buttocks (GB) 1733	Bloody Buttocks (GB)	(unknown)	(unknown)
Dam Grey Bloody Buttocks (GB) 1733	Bloody Buttocks (GB)	(unknown)	(unknown)
Dam Grey Bloody Buttocks (GB) 1733	Bloody Buttocks (GB)	(unknown)	(unknown)
Dam Grey Bloody Buttocks (GB) 1733	Bloody Buttocks (GB)	(unknown)	(unknown)
Dam Grey Bloody Buttocks (GB) 1733	Sister to Guy (GB); 1716	Greyhound	Chillaby
Dam Grey Bloody Buttocks (GB) 1733	Sister to Guy (GB); 1716	Greyhound	Slugey
Dam Grey Bloody Buttocks (GB) 1733	Sister to Guy (GB); 1716	Brown Farewell	Makeless
Dam Grey Bloody Buttocks (GB) 1733	Sister to Guy (GB); 1716	Brown Farewell	Brimmer mare
