= Aimwell =

British Thoroughbred racehorse

- Sire: Mark Anthony
- Grandsire: Spectator
- Dam: sister to Postmaster
- Damsire: Herod
- Sex: Stallion
- Foaled: 1782
- Country: Kingdom of Great Britain
- Colour: Brown
- Breeder: Mr. Carteret
- Owner: Lord Clermont
- Trainer: J. Pratt
- Record: 8:5-2-1

Major wins
- Epsom Derby (1785)

Aimwell (1782 – after 1786) was a British Thoroughbred racehorse. In a career that lasted from autumn 1784 to spring 1786, he ran eight times and won five races. In 1785, he won the sixth running of the Epsom Derby as well as three races at Newmarket. He was beaten in his only race in 1786, and did not appear in any subsequent records.

== Background ==
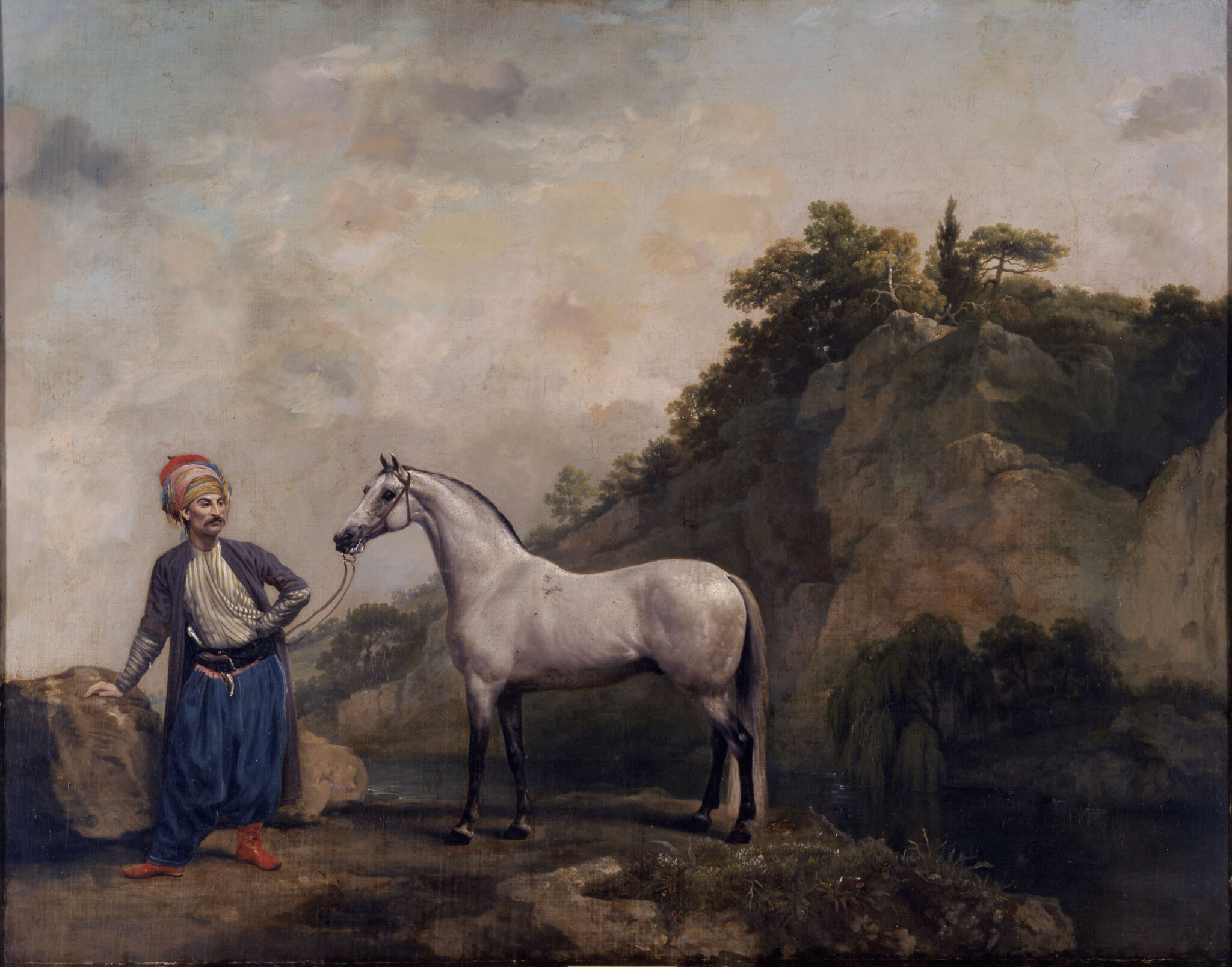
Alcock's Arabian, Aimwell's male-line ancestor

Aimwell, named after a character in The Beaux' Stratagem, was a brown horse bred by William Fortescue, 1st Earl of Clermont, who owned him during his racing career. Unlike all modern Thoroughbreds, which descend in the male line from either the Darley Arabian, the Godolphin Arabian, or the Byerley Turk, Aimwell was descended from a grey stallion usually known as Alcock's Arabian. Although the Alcock Arabian's sireline became extinct, his influence survives as the probable source of the grey colour in the modern Thoroughbred.

Aimwell's sire, Mark Anthony, a half-brother to Highflyer, won twenty races at Newmarket for his owner, the Duke of Ancaster, in the early 1770s. Aimwell was the second of ten foals produced by a mare by Herod, known as the sister to Postmaster, who was bred by Mr Carteret and later sold to Lord Clermont.

== Racing career ==
=== 1784: two-year-old season ===
Aimwell began his career at the Houghton meeting at Newmarket in late October or early November 1784. He won a 150 guinea race, beating Mr Panton's colt Archer over the six furlong Two Year Old Course. Archer was the 8/11 favourite and the only other runner.

=== 1785: three-year-old season ===
In spring 1785, Aimwell won 100 guineas by defeating Archer again over the same course and distance. On this occasion Aimwell carried seven pounds more than his opponent and started the 2/5 favourite. At the same Newmarket meeting, he finished third in the Prince's Stakes, a race won by Mr Fox's Balloon, who defeated Lord Grosvenor's Grantham in a run-off after a dead heat. At Epsom on 5 May, Aimwell started at odds of 7/1 for the Derby in a field of ten runners, with Grantham and Balloon joint favourites on 2/1. Ridden by C. Hindley he won the race from Grantham, with Balloon unplaced.

After a five-month break, Aimwell returned for three races at Newmarket in the autumn. At the First October meeting he won a match race over the four mile Beacon Course, winning a 300 guinea prize by beating Mr Vernon's horse Mousetrap. Aimwell was beaten in a 200 guinea Sweepstakes at the Second October meeting, in which he finished second of the four runners to Guyler. At the Houghton meeting two weeks later he conceded 35 pounds to Sir Charles Bunbury's Blacklock and won a match over ten furlongs "Across the Flat" to claim a prize of 100 guineas.

=== 1786: four-year-old season ===
Aimwell stayed in training at the age of four years, but ran only once. At the Second Spring meeting at Newmarket he was beaten in a two-mile match in which he attempted to concede six pounds to Balloon.

== Stud career ==
Nothing is recorded of Aimwell after his match race against Balloon. He does not appear in any list of stallions and he had no foals registered in the General Stud Book.

== Pedigree ==
Pedigree of Aimwell (GB), brown stallion, 1782
Sire Mark Anthony (GB) 1767	Spectator; 1749	Crab	Alcock's Arabian
Sire Mark Anthony (GB) 1767	Spectator; 1749	Crab	sister to Soreheels
Sire Mark Anthony (GB) 1767	Spectator; 1749	Partner mare	Partner*
Sire Mark Anthony (GB) 1767	Spectator; 1749	Partner mare	Bonny Lass
Sire Mark Anthony (GB) 1767	Rachel; 1763	Blank	Godolphin Arabian
Sire Mark Anthony (GB) 1767	Rachel; 1763	Blank	Amorett
Sire Mark Anthony (GB) 1767	Rachel; 1763	Regulus mare	Regulus
Sire Mark Anthony (GB) 1767	Rachel; 1763	Regulus mare	Soreheels mare
Dam sister to Postmaster (GB) 1774	Herod; 1758	Tartar	Partner*
Dam sister to Postmaster (GB) 1774	Herod; 1758	Tartar	Meliora
Dam sister to Postmaster (GB) 1774	Herod; 1758	Cypron	Blaze
Dam sister to Postmaster (GB) 1774	Herod; 1758	Cypron	Salome
Dam sister to Postmaster (GB) 1774	Snap mare	Snap	Snip
Dam sister to Postmaster (GB) 1774	Snap mare	Snap	sister to Slipby
Dam sister to Postmaster (GB) 1774	Snap mare	Gower Stallion mare	Gower Stallion
Dam sister to Postmaster (GB) 1774	Snap mare	Gower Stallion mare	Grey Childers mare (Family:10)

* Aimwell is inbred 4S × 4D to the stallion Partner, meaning that he appears fourth generation on the sire side of his pedigree and fourth generation on the dam side of his pedigree.
