= Noble (horse) =

British Thoroughbred racehorse

- Sire: Highflyer
- Grandsire: Herod
- Dam: Brim
- Damsire: Squirrel
- Sex: Stallion
- Foaled: 1783
- Country: Kingdom of Great Britain
- Colour: Bay
- Breeder: Thomas Panton
- Owner: Thomas Panton
- Trainer: Francis Neale
- Record: 3:2-0-0

Major wins
- Epsom Derby (1786)

Noble (1783 – after 1796) was a British Thoroughbred racehorse and sire. In a career that lasted from May 1786 to May 1788 he ran at least three times and won two races. He won the seventh running of The Derby as a 30/1 outsider in what was probably his first race. His only other success came at Newmarket later that year. He was retired to stud where he stood as a stallion for several years but made little impact as a sire of winners.

== Background ==
Noble was a bay horse standing 15.1 hands high bred by his owner, Thomas Panton. Noble was one of three Derby winners sired by Highflyer a successful racehorse who became an outstanding breeding stallion, winning the title of Champion sire on 13 occasions (1785–1796, 1798). He was the fourth of ten foals produced by Lord Farnham's mare Brim, an important broodmare who was the direct female ancestor of the Derby winners Cedric and Doncaster.

There are few available records for Noble's racing career, and it is likely that he had more races than the three detailed below.

== Racing career ==
=== 1786: three-year-old season ===
There is no record of Noble having run before the Derby, and it seems likely that the Classic was his first racecourse appearance. At Epsom, on 31 May Noble started a 30/1 outsider for the Derby in a field of fifteen runners. Dennis O'Kelly's filly Scota was the 2/1 favourite ahead of Lord Grosvenor's colt Meteor. Ridden by J. White, Noble won from Meteor with Claret finishing third. Following his defeat by Noble, Meteor set a British record by winning his next 21 races.

After a break of almost five months, Noble returned to the racecourse at Newmarket in autumn. At the Second October meeting, Noble ran in a 200 guinea Sweepstakes "Across the Flat" (ten furlongs). He won the race by beating Lord George Cavendish's brother to Steady at level weights.

=== 1788: five-year-old season ===
On 7 May 1788, Noble returned to the scene of his most important success when he ran in a race at Epsom. The race was run in a series of four mile heats and Noble started favourite at 5/4. The race was won in three heats by the six-year-old mare Cowslip, the winner of the 1785 St Leger: the placed horses are not recorded.

== Stud career ==
In 1790 Noble stood as a stallion at Hampton Lodge near Farnham in Surrey at a fee of 2 guineas. By 1793 he had been moved to Mitchen Hall near Godalming. He was described as "a sure foal-getter" whose offspring were "handsome, large and bony". His fee had increased to 3 guineas by 1796, when he was based at Yateley in Hampshire, but he did not appear in subsequent lists of stallions in the Racing Calendar.

Noble has only one recorded foal in the General Stud Book: a colt named Sheet Anchor was registered as being bred by Mr Durand in 1795 sired by Noble out of a mare by Herod. This may suggest that his stud career mainly involved covering non-Thoroughbred mares. A report from 1822 mentions two other foals, Mr Vernon's Young Noble and Mr Whaley's Mary Grey, but notes that "very few of his get were ever trained."

== Pedigree ==
Pedigree of Noble (GB), bay stallion, 1783
Sire Highflyer (GB) 1774	Herod; 1758	Tartar	Partner*
Sire Highflyer (GB) 1774	Herod; 1758	Tartar	Meliora
Sire Highflyer (GB) 1774	Herod; 1758	Cypron	Blaze
Sire Highflyer (GB) 1774	Herod; 1758	Cypron	Salome
Sire Highflyer (GB) 1774	Rachel; 1763	Blank*	Godolphin Arabian*
Sire Highflyer (GB) 1774	Rachel; 1763	Blank*	Amorett*
Sire Highflyer (GB) 1774	Rachel; 1763	Regulus mare	Regulus
Sire Highflyer (GB) 1774	Rachel; 1763	Regulus mare	Soreheels mare
Dam Brim (GB) 1771	Squirrel; 1754	Traveller	Partner*
Dam Brim (GB) 1771	Squirrel; 1754	Traveller	Almanzor mare
Dam Brim (GB) 1771	Squirrel; 1754	Grey Bloody Buttocks	Bloody Buttocks
Dam Brim (GB) 1771	Squirrel; 1754	Grey Bloody Buttocks	Greyhound mare
Dam Brim (GB) 1771	Helen; 1758	Blank*	Godolphin Arabian*
Dam Brim (GB) 1771	Helen; 1758	Blank*	Amorett*
Dam Brim (GB) 1771	Helen; 1758	Mab	Crab
Dam Brim (GB) 1771	Helen; 1758	Mab	Miss Jigg (Family:9-d)

* Noble is inbred 3S x 3D to the stallion Blank, meaning that he appears third generation on the sire side of his pedigree and third generation on the dam side of his pedigree.

* Noble is inbred 4S x 4D to the stallion Partner, meaning that he appears fourth generation on the sire side of his pedigree and fourth generation on the dam side of his pedigree.
