= 1786 in sports =

1786 in sports describes the year's events in world sport.

== Boxing ==
Events

- 11 January — Tom Johnson defeated Bill Lowe at Barnet in the first round after four minutes.
- 11 February — Tom Johnson defeated Jack Towers at Barnet in a 15-minute fight.
- 31 October — "Big" Ben Brain defeated "The Fighting Grenadier" John Boone at Long Fields in a 30 to 40 minute fight, depending on the source.

== Cricket ==
Events

- Tom Sueter of Hampshire was given out for hitting the ball twice, the first recorded instance of this type of dismissal.
- First-class debut of the noted opening batsman Tom Walker, who is believed to have invented roundarm bowling.

England

- Most runs – Tom Walker 423
- Most wickets – Robert Clifford 23

== Horse racing ==
England

- The Derby – Noble
- The Oaks – Yellow Filly
- St Leger Stakes – Paragon
- The inaugural July Stakes was run at Newmarket Racecourse and is the oldest race for two-year-olds still run in Great Britain.
