= Bloody Buttocks =

British Thoroughbred sire

- Sex: Stallion
- Foaled: 1725
- Country: Great Britain
- Colour: Grey
- Breeder: John Crofts
- Owner: John Crofts

Awards
- Leading sire in Great Britain and Ireland (1739)

Bloody Buttocks was a British Thoroughbred sire who was the leading sire in Great Britain and Ireland in 1739. He was owned by John Crofts.

== Background ==
Bloody Buttocks was a grey Arabian horse bred by Mr. Crofts, but his pedigree was never published. The horse found his unusual name from a red mark on his hip.

== Stud career ==
Bloody Buttocks was a successful stallion for Crofts at Barforth in Yorkshire. He was leading sire in Great Britain and Ireland in 1739 and sired many good runners and broodmares, including:

- Louse – a grey horse foaled in 1726, his dam by Greyhound. He won two races at Newmarket and the Royal Plate at Salisbury.
- Grey Brocklesby – a grey mare foaled in 1728 out of Brocklesby She was the dam of Little John who won many King's Plates. Her daughter Caelia was the granddam of Gimcrack
- Bay Bloody Buttocks – a bay mare foaled in 1729 out of a daughter of Greyhound She was the dam of King's Plate winner Spinster.
- Whitefoot – a chestnut horse foaled in 1729. He won the Royal Plates at Edinburgh and Newmarket. He sired Sportsman, who won many King's Plates.
- Flintshire Lady – a bay mare foaled in 1731, dam by Jigg. She was the dam of Jenny Jessamy.
- Careless – also known as Hazard, a chestnut horse foaled in 1733, his dam by Greyhound. He won several races from 1738 to 1745.
- Dairymaid – also known as Grey Bloody Buttocks, a grey mare foaled in 1733, she was a full-sister to Bay Bloody Buttocks. She was the dam of Squirrel, who won the inaugural 1400 Guineas Stakes in 1758. Squirrel was also the damsire of Derby winner Noble.
- Dairymaid – a bay mare foaled in 1737 out of Bay Brocklesby. She was the dam of Prince T'Quassaw.
- Madam – a grey mare foaled in 1737, her dam by Cade. She won her only two races, one at Bishop Auckland and one at Durham, and was the dam of Twig.

He also sired Rainbow and was the damsire of Belmont, who was beaten only twice.
