= Rhadamanthus (horse) =

British Thoroughbred racehorse

- Sire: Justice
- Grandsire: Herod
- Dam: Flyer
- Damsire: Sweetbriar
- Sex: Stallion
- Foaled: 1787
- Country: Kingdom of Great Britain
- Colour: Bay or Brown
- Breeder: Lord Grosvenor
- Owner: 1) Lord Grosvenor; 2) William Frisby
- Trainer: J. Pratt
- Record: 9:5-2-0

Major wins
- Prince's Stakes (1790); Epsom Derby (1790)

Rhadamanthus (1787 – after 1795) was a British Thoroughbred racehorse and sire. In a career that lasted from April 1790 to 1793 he ran nine times and won five races. In the summer of 1790 he proved himself one of the best British colts of his generation, winning The Derby while still undefeated. He raced until the age of six, winning three further races. All of his runs apart from the Derby were at Newmarket.

== Background ==
Rhadamanthus, described as either a bay or brown horse, was bred by his owner Lord Grosvenor from his mare Flyer, who went on to produce the 1794 Derby winner Daedalus. Rhadamanthus and Daedalus were the most notable horses sired by Lord Grosvenor's horse Justice, who during his racing career had won two races at Newmarket.

== Racing career ==
=== 1790: three-year-old season ===
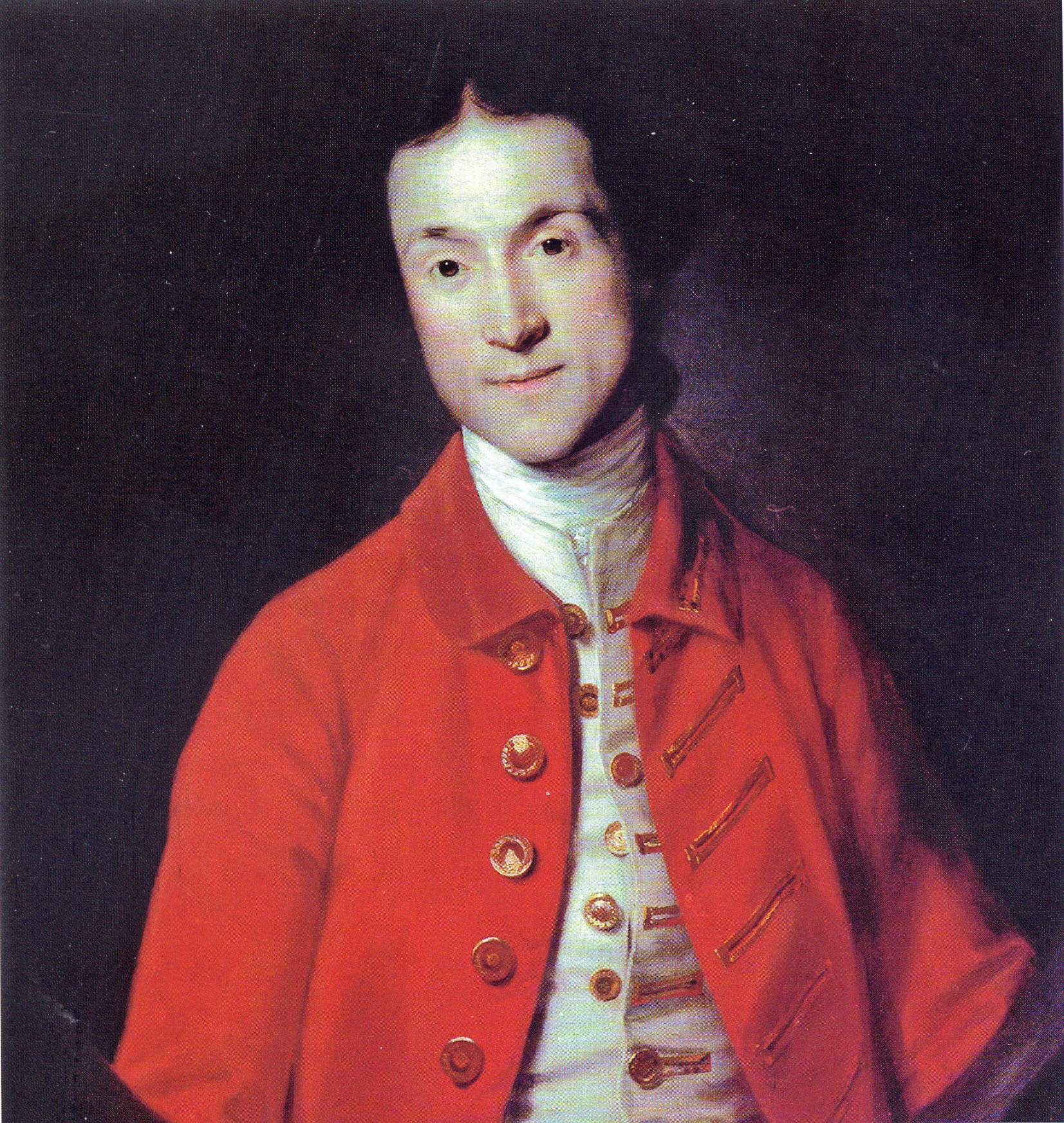
Lord Grosvenor, owner and breeder of Rhadamanthus, attributed to Joshua Reynolds

Rhadamanthus made his first racecourse appearance at Newmarket's First Spring meeting on 25 April, when he contested a division of the Prince's Stakes "Across the flat" (ten furlongs). He started the even money favourite and won from Lord Derby's Lee Boo and the Duke of Bedford's Thunderbolt. At the next Newmarket meeting he was withdrawn from a match race against Lord Egremont's colt Precipitate, with Lord Grosvenor paying a forfeit.

Lord Grosvenor was strongly represented in the Derby at Epsom on 22 May. Apart from Rhadamanthus, the 5/4 favourite, he was also represented by Asparagus, who was second in the betting at 4/1. Ridden by John Arnull (or Arnold), Rhadamanthus beat his stable companion to win the ten runner race, with Lee Boo finishing third.

Rhadamanthus was off the racecourse for almost five months before returning for two races at Newmarket in autumn. On 19 October he ran in a Sweepstakes for three-year-olds over the two-mile "Ditch In" course. Starting at odds of 1/3 against six opponents, he won from the Prince of Wales's colt Fitzwilliam. Rhadamanthus's unbeaten run came to an end on 1 November, when he finished second to Asparagus at level weights in a five-runner Sweepstakes Across the Flat.

=== 1791: four-year-old season ===
Rhadamanthus was entered for the Claret Stakes on 13 May, but did not run. His first and only appearance in 1791 was at Newmarket's July meeting where he contested a Sweepstakes for four-year-olds over ten furlongs. He started the 5/4 favourite and won from Chanticleer, who was conceding eleven pounds, Old Gold and Caroline, earning 1,350 guineas for Lord Grosvenor.

=== 1792: five-year-old season ===
Rhadamanthus's first run of 1792 came in the Oatlands Stakes, a handicap race at Newmarket over two miles on 7 April. With more than fifty subscribers paying 100 guineas to enter, the race's prize of 5,375 guineas made it far more valuable than any of the Classics– the Derby for instance attracted thirty-two entries at 50 guineas for a prize of 1,600 guineas. Rhadamanthus started the 5/2 favourite in a field of twenty runners but finished unplaced behind Mr Bullock's horse Toby. Later that month Lord Grosvenor claimed a prize of 1,200 guineas when Rhadamanthus was allowed to walk over in a Sweepstakes over Newmarket's Round Course, the other fifteen entries having been withdrawn Rhadamanthus made his only other start of the season at Newmarket in autumn. On 18 October he finished unplaced behind Mr Bullock's horse Halbert in a 60 guinea weight-for-age race over the Ditch In course.

=== 1793: six-year-old season ===
Rhadamanthus ran only once in his final season. On 30 April he received eleven pounds from Mr Wilson's six-year-old Buzzard and was beaten in a match race over the Rowley Mile course.

== Stud career ==
By 1795, Radamanthus had been sold to William Frisby and was standing for one guinea and a half crown at various locations in Northamptonshire, cycling throughout the week between Market Harborough, Stamford, Uppingham, and Oakham. The only foals sired by "Rhadamanthus" in the General Stud Book were the progeny of another stallion of the same name who was foaled in 1815.

== Pedigree ==
Pedigree of Rhadamanthus (GB), bay stallion, 1787
Sire Justice (GB) 1774	Herod; 1758	Tartar	Partner
Sire Justice (GB) 1774	Herod; 1758	Tartar	Meteora
Sire Justice (GB) 1774	Herod; 1758	Cypron	Blaze
Sire Justice (GB) 1774	Herod; 1758	Cypron	Salome
Sire Justice (GB) 1774	Curiosity; 1760	Snap	Snip
Sire Justice (GB) 1774	Curiosity; 1760	Snap	sister to Slipby
Sire Justice (GB) 1774	Curiosity; 1760	Regulus mare	Regulus
Sire Justice (GB) 1774	Curiosity; 1760	Regulus mare	Childers mare
Dam Flyer (GB) 1777	Sweetbriar; 1769	Syphon	Squirt
Dam Flyer (GB) 1777	Sweetbriar; 1769	Syphon	Patriot mare
Dam Flyer (GB) 1777	Sweetbriar; 1769	Shakespeare mare	Shakespeare
Dam Flyer (GB) 1777	Sweetbriar; 1769	Shakespeare mare	Miss Meredith
Dam Flyer (GB) 1777	Squirrel mare 1767	Squirrel	Traveller
Dam Flyer (GB) 1777	Squirrel mare 1767	Squirrel	Grey Bloody Buttocks
Dam Flyer (GB) 1777	Squirrel mare 1767	Blank mare	Blank
Dam Flyer (GB) 1777	Squirrel mare 1767	Blank mare	Regulus mare (Family:1-a)
