= Daedalus (horse) =

British Thoroughbred racehorse

- Sire: Justice
- Grandsire: Herod
- Dam: Flyer
- Damsire: Sweetbriar
- Sex: Stallion
- Foaled: 1791
- Country: Kingdom of Great Britain
- Colour: Bay
- Breeder: Lord Grosvenor
- Owner: Lord Grosvenor
- Trainer: J. Pratt
- Record: 3:1-1-0
- Earnings: £2,350

Major wins
- Epsom Derby (1794)

Daedalus (1791 – after 1804) was a British Thoroughbred racehorse and sire. In a brief career that lasted from April to October 1794 he ran three times and won once. He won the Derby on his racecourse debut, beating the smallest field in the history of the race. He was beaten in two races later that year and was retired.

== Background ==
Daedalus (or Dædalus) was a bay horse bred by his owner Lord Grosvenor from his mare Flyer, who had previously produced the 1790 Derby winner Rhadamanthus. Daedalus and Rhadamanthus were the most notable horses sired by Lord Grosvenor's horse Justice, who during his racing career had won two races at Newmarket.

== Racing career ==
=== 1794: three-year-old season ===
Daedalus made his first racecourse appearance in the Derby at Epsom on 5 June. Forty-nine horses had been entered for the race at 50 guineas each, but only four ran, including a stable companion of Daedalus who was not included in the betting. This four-horse field was the smallest in Derby history. The Duke of Bedford's Leon was the 4/5 favourite, with Lord Egremont's unnamed Highflyer colt (later named Ragged Jack) the 2/1 second choice and Daedalus starting at odds of 6/1. Ridden by Frank Buckle, Daedalus won from the Highflyer colt, with Leon third. Daedalus gave his owner a third Derby win in five years, while Buckle was recording the second of his five victories.

After a break of four months, Daedalus returned to the racecourse for two runs at Newmarket in autumn. On 17 October he was one of three runners in a 100 guinea Sweepstakes over the two mile "Ditch In" course. Daedalus started favourite at odds of 4/6, but finished second at level weight to Mr Wilson's colt Bennington. Ten days later, Daedalus ran in another Sweepstakes over the same course and distance. On this occasion he started 5/2 second favourite and finished fourth of the six runners behind Bennington. At the end of the year Daedalus was sold to Mr. A Bayton and did not race again.

== Retirement ==
Little is recorded of Daedalus after his sale to Mr. Bayton. He does not appear in any lists of stallions and has no progeny recorded in the General Stud Book which noted that he had been "sent to Russia." In Russia, he was owned by Count Alexis Orlov, the brother of Gregory Orlov, who also imported the 1792 St. Leger winner Tartar. Count Orlov mainly bred trotting horses, the "Orlov Trotters," that became a celebrated breed of harness racehorse in the 19th century with lines that have persisted to modern times.

== Pedigree ==
Pedigree of Daedalus (GB), bay stallion, 1791
Sire Justice (GB) 1774	Herod; 1758	Tartar	Partner
Sire Justice (GB) 1774	Herod; 1758	Tartar	Meteora
Sire Justice (GB) 1774	Herod; 1758	Cypron	Blaze
Sire Justice (GB) 1774	Herod; 1758	Cypron	Salome
Sire Justice (GB) 1774	Curiosity; 1760	Snap	Snip
Sire Justice (GB) 1774	Curiosity; 1760	Snap	sister to Slipby
Sire Justice (GB) 1774	Curiosity; 1760	Regulus mare	Regulus
Sire Justice (GB) 1774	Curiosity; 1760	Regulus mare	Childers mare
Dam Flyer (GB) 1777	Sweetbriar; 1769	Syphon	Squirt
Dam Flyer (GB) 1777	Sweetbriar; 1769	Syphon	Patriot mare
Dam Flyer (GB) 1777	Sweetbriar; 1769	Shakespeare mare	Shakespeare
Dam Flyer (GB) 1777	Sweetbriar; 1769	Shakespeare mare	Miss Meredith
Dam Flyer (GB) 1777	Squirrel mare 1767	Squirrel	Traveller
Dam Flyer (GB) 1777	Squirrel mare 1767	Squirrel	Grey Bloody Buttocks
Dam Flyer (GB) 1777	Squirrel mare 1767	Blank mare	Blank
Dam Flyer (GB) 1777	Squirrel mare 1767	Blank mare	Regulus mare (Family:1-a)
