= Partner (horse) =

British Thoroughbred racehorse

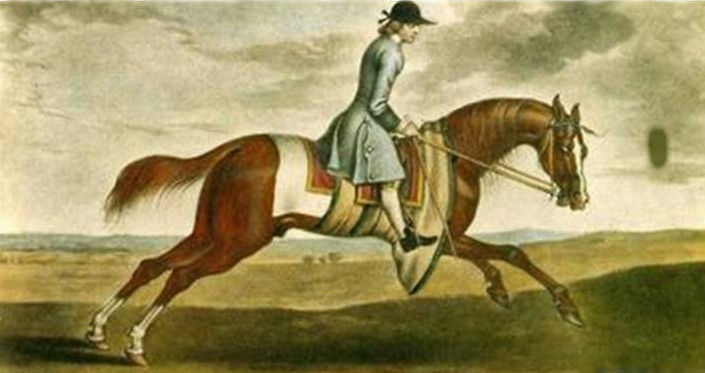
- Sire: Jigg
- Grandsire: Byerley Turk
- Dam: Sister to Mixbury
- Damsire: Curwen's Bay Barb
- Sex: Stallion
- Foaled: 1718
- Country: Great Britain
- Colour: Chestnut
- Breeder: Charles Pelham of Lincolnshire
- Owner: Mr. Cotton of Sussex; Lord Halifax; John Croft of Barforth, Yorkshire
- Record: 7 starts, 6 wins

Awards
- Leading sire in Great Britain and Ireland (1737, 1740, 1741, 1743)
- Last updated on 29 August 2012

Partner (also known as Croft's Partner or Old Partner) was a British Thoroughbred racehorse and sire. He won six of his seven races before being retired to stud where he was the Leading sire in Great Britain and Ireland four times, and continued the Byerley Turk sire-line.

== Racing career ==
Partner's breeder sold him to Mr. Cotton of Sussex, who in turn sold him to Lord Halifax. Lord Halifax raced the colt with great success over four mile courses. He was unbeaten in 1723 and 1724, taking the following year off to come back to the track in 1726, beating Sloven in a match race. His only loss was in a race in 1728 to Smiling Ball, after which he was sold to John Croft to begin his breeding career.

== Stud career ==
His most important son was Tartar, who went on to sire the very influential Herod. He also sired Cato, Golden Ball, Sedbury, Morton's Traveller, (b c 1746 - exported to United States and a good sire there) and Traveller (1735), as well as the dam of Matchem, before his death at 29.

== Sire line tree ==
- Partner
  - Partner (Grisewood)
  - Partner (Moore)
    - Grey Spot
  - Cato
  - Little John
  - Spectre
  - Sedbury
    - Soldier
    - Alfred
    - Tantivy
  - Golden Ball
  - Merry Andrew
  - Badger
  - Tartar
    - Miner
      - Quibbler
    - Beaufremont
    - Herod
      - Florizel
        - Moustrap
        - Crookshanks
        - Diomed
        - Ulysses
        - King William
        - Admiral
        - Fortunio
        - Slender
        - Punch
        - Fidget
        - Brilliant
        - Bustler
        - Florizel
        - Prizefighter
        - Eager
        - Slapbang
        - Tartar
        - Ninety-three
      - Magnet
        - Ringwood
        - Poker
        - Shoveler
        - Dare Devil
        - Magnetic Needle
      - Plunder
        - Oak
      - Postmaster
        - Express
      - Fitzherod
        - Mufti
      - Woodpecker
        - Buzzard
        - Chanticleer
        - Dragon
        - Young Woodpecker
      - Bourdeaux
        - Highlander
      - Highflyer
        - Delpini
        - Pharamond
        - Rockingham
        - Highflyer (Hyde)
        - Slope
        - Noble
        - Sir Peter Teazle
        - Spadille
        - Escape
        - Traveller
        - Skylark
        - Skyscraper
        - Sourcrout
        - Walnut
        - Lambinos
        - St George
        - Oberon
        - Exton
        - Moorcock
        - Diamond
        - Highflyer
      - Justice
        - Mentor
        - Rhadamanthus
        - Daedalus
      - Il' Mio
        - Blandish
        - Minos
      - Weazle
      - Whipcord
      - Anvil
        - St George
        - Cymbeline
        - O' Kelly
      - Drone
        - Arra Kooker
        - Lounger
      - Fortitude
        - John Bull
      - Tom Tug(g)
        - Commodore
      - Bagot
        - Master Bagot
      - Phoenomenon
        - Ambidexter
        - Boreas
        - Diomed (Tate)
        - Idas
        - Lizard
        - Huby
        - Restless
        - Freeholder
        - Roman
        - Spunk
        - Gay Deceiver
        - Brilliant
        - Hydaspes
        - Tygress
        - Hero
        - Wonder
        - Firetail
        - Stripling
        - Brother to Vivaldi
    - Tartar (Wildman)
  - Traveller (Old)
    - Dainty Davy
      - David
      - Hambletonian
      - Gilkicker
      - Pilot
        - David
      - Pine-Apple
    - Squirrel
      - Firetail
      - Dasher
  - Traveller (Morton)
    - Ariel
    - Partner (Lightfoot)
    - Yorick
      - Junius
      - Polyphemus
      - Cub
    - Bellair
    - Silverlegs
    - Tristram Shandy
    - Traveller (Lloyd)
      - True Briton
        - Figure

== Pedigree ==
Pedigree of Partner (Croft's Old), chestnut stallion, 1718
Sire Jigg	Byerley Turk	(unknown)	(unknown)
Sire Jigg	Byerley Turk	(unknown)	(unknown)
Sire Jigg	Byerley Turk	(unknown)	(unknown)
Sire Jigg	Byerley Turk	(unknown)	(unknown)
Sire Jigg	Charming Jenny	Spanker	D'Arcy Yellow Turk
Sire Jigg	Charming Jenny	Spanker	Old Morocco mare*
Sire Jigg	Charming Jenny	Old Morocco mare*	Fairfax Morocco Barb
Sire Jigg	Charming Jenny	Old Morocco mare*	Old Bald Peg
Dam Sister to Mixbury	Curwen's Bay Barb	(unknown)	(unknown)
Dam Sister to Mixbury	Curwen's Bay Barb	(unknown)	(unknown)
Dam Sister to Mixbury	Curwen's Bay Barb	(unknown)	(unknown)
Dam Sister to Mixbury	Curwen's Bay Barb	(unknown)	(unknown)
Dam Sister to Mixbury	Curwen Spot mare	Curwen's Old Spot	Selaby Turk
Dam Sister to Mixbury	Curwen Spot mare	Curwen's Old Spot	(unknown)
Dam Sister to Mixbury	Curwen Spot mare	Lowther Barb mare	White Legged Lowther Barb
Dam Sister to Mixbury	Curwen Spot mare	Lowther Barb mare	Vintner mare (Family: 9)

* Partner is inbred 3S × 4S to the mare Old Morocco mare, meaning that she appears once third generation and once fourth generation on the sire side of his pedigree.

== See also ==
- List of leading Thoroughbred racehorses
