= John L. Hervey =

American writer

John Lewis Hervey (1870 – December 31, 1947) was an American writer known as an authority on Thoroughbred horses. Hervey was born in Jefferson, Ohio. In 1890 he moved to Chicago and began writing on horses, using the names "Salvator" and "Volunteer". He also published a history of Thoroughbred horses for the New York Jockey Club and the American Trotter (1947). Hervey died in Chicago on December 31, 1947.

== Selected publications ==
- Racing in America
- The American Trotter (1947)
