= 1400 Guineas Stakes =

- Class: Horse
- Location: Newmarket Racecourse; Newmarket, England
- Inaugurated: 1758
- Race type: Flat / Thoroughbred

Race information
- Distance: 4 miles 1½ furlongs
- Surface: Turf
- Qualification: Four-year-olds
- Weight: 8 st 10 lb (colts); 8 st 7 lb (fillies)

The 1400 Guineas Stakes was a flat horse race in Great Britain open to thoroughbreds aged four years. It was run at Newmarket and was one of the most important races of the second half of the 18th century.

== History ==
The 1400 Guineas was established in 1757 to be first run on the Monday before the first Thursday in October 1758. It was established by the 2nd Marquess of Rockingham, Marquess of Granby, 2nd Earl of Northumberland, 1st Earl of Gower, Sir James Lowther, Thomas Panton and Jenison Shafto. They agreed the race was to be run over the Beacon course at Newmarket and would be open to four-year-old colts and fillies. They paid a 200 guineas subscription each to enter their horse. Colts would carry 8 st 7 lb and fillies 8 st 4 lb.

The race was initially to be run for five consecutive years from 1758, but was subsequently renewed in 1763. The weights were changed in 1768, with colts carrying 8 st 10 lb and fillies 8 st 7 lb. The race was discontinued after 1782 and a similar race was started for three-year-olds in 1784.

== Winners ==
Year	Winner	Owner
1758	Squirrel	Jenison Shafto
1759	David	2nd Earl Gower
1760	Fribble	Jenison Shafto
1761	Whiffer	Jenison Shafto
1762	Boldface	2nd Earl of Northumberland
1763	Snap colt	Jenison Shafto
1764	Prophet	2nd Viscount Bolingbroke
1765	Sweepstakes	2nd Earl Gower
1766	Doge	2nd Viscount Bolingbroke
1767	Chequino	Jenison Shafto
1768	Goldfinder	Jenison Shafto
1769	Bay Halkin	Lord Grosvenor
1770	Solon	2nd Marquess of Rockingham
1771	Patrician	2nd Viscount Bolingbroke
1772	Augur	16th Earl of Ormonde
1773	Nancy	Duke of Cumberland
1774	Comus	16th Earl of Ormonde
1775	Coxcomb	16th Earl of Ormonde
1776	Dorimant	16th Earl of Ormonde
1777	Dictator	1st Earl of Clermont
1778	Highflyer	2nd Viscount Bolingbroke
1779	Mexican	Lord Grosvenor
1780	Fame	Mr. Vernon
1781	Boudrow	Dennis O'Kelly
1782	Signor	1st Earl of Clermont

== See also ==
- Horseracing in Great Britain
- List of British flat horse races
