= Alcock's Arabian =

Foundation sire of the Thoroughbred breed

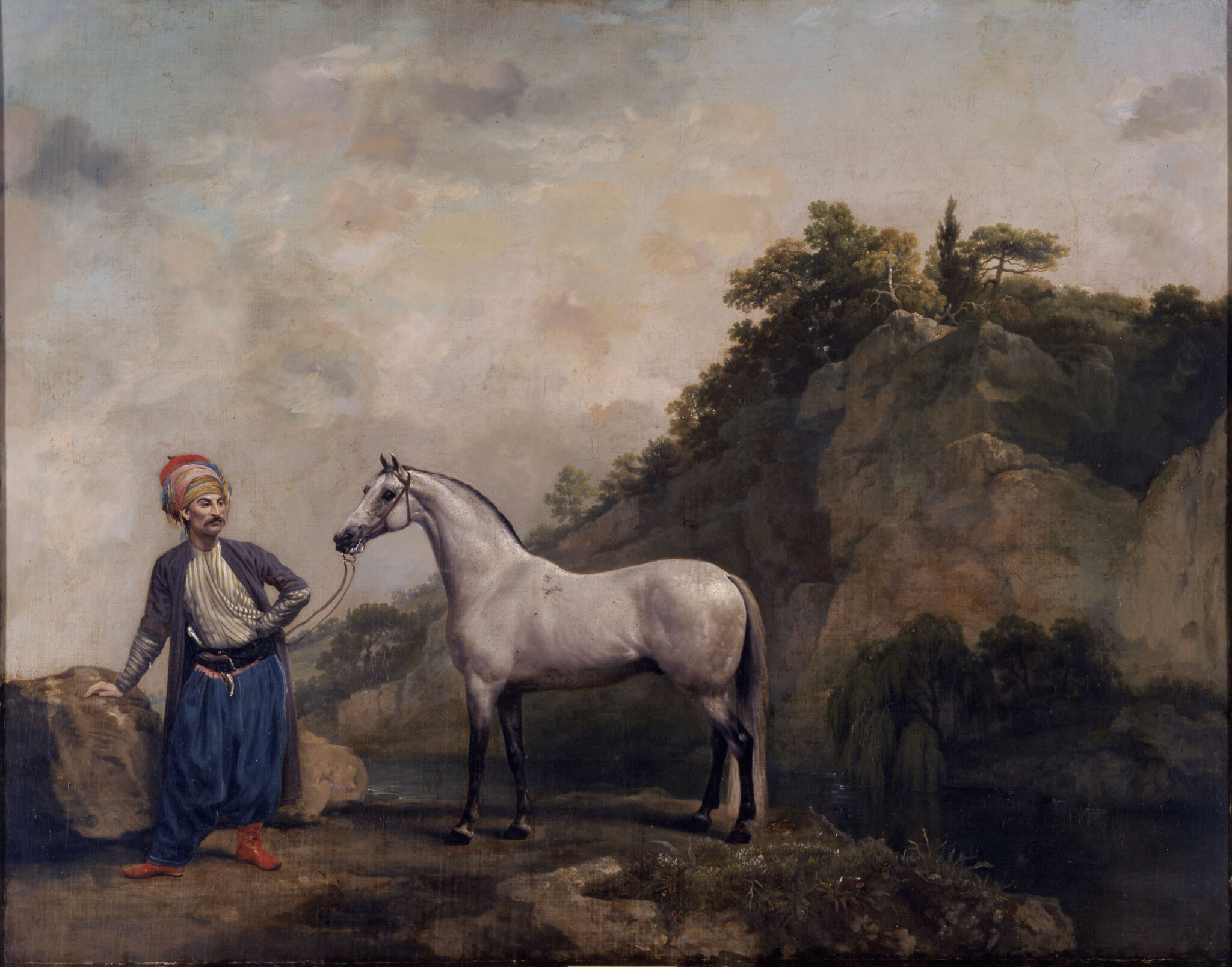
- Alcock's Arabian
- Breed: Thoroughbred
- Sire: Curwen's Bay Barb
- Dam: Old Wen Mare (Sister to Clumsey)
- Damsire: Hautboy
- Sex: Stallion
- Foaled: c. 1700
- Died: c. 1733
- Country: Great Britain
- Colour: Grey
- Breeder: Sir J. Parsons
- Owner: Mr Alcock; Mr Charles Pelham; Peregrine Bertie, 2nd Duke of Ancaster and Kesteven

Awards
- Champion sire in Great Britain and Ireland (1728)

Alcock's Arabian (foaled about 1700, died about 1733), also known as Pelham Grey Arabian and less certainly as Bloody Buttocks and Ancaster Turk, among other names, is the ancestor of all grey-coloured Thoroughbred horses, as well as grey sport and riding horses descended from Thoroughbred lines.

== Origins and career ==
It was claimed in the 19th century that Sir Robert Sutton (1671–1746), English ambassador to the Ottoman Empire in Constantinople from 1700 to 1717, had acquired horses there, including Alcock's Arabian, the Holderness Turk, and the Brownlow Turk, and had had them shipped to England in 1704. However, there is no evidence that Alcock's Arabian was among these horses. It is more likely that he was bred in England. Lady Wentworth of the Crabbet Arabian Stud researched the foundation sires and found some confusion due to horses' names changing as they changed owners. She eventually concluded that every imported grey stallion she could find sufficient information to review was the same horse as Alcock's Arabian. While it is true that the horse may have been known under several different names, including Pelham's Grey Horse, and Bloody Buttocks, if he was bred in England, as now believed, he could not have been the same horse as one imported. It has been claimed that the horse was imported early in the 18th century, but there is no firm evidence to support this assertion. The General Stud Book lists Sir Watkin Wynn's Spot, a horse now accepted as having been sired by Alcock's Arabian, as: "...by a son of the Curwen Bay Barb (which was out of Sir J. Parsons's Old Wen Mare, sister to Clumsey)...", which is strong evidence. The Old Wen Mare may have been the same mare as the exceptional broodmare Grey Wilkes, and if not was probably her full sister.

The horse is reported to have been foaled in 1700. In any event, he was in England by 1704, ending up recorded in the General Stud Book in the hands of a man named Alcock who was a farmer and breeder in Lincolnshire. He became an influential stud in the early 1700s, and in 1722 Alcock sold him to the Duke of Ancaster.

== Bloodlines and influence ==
The horse's sire line was significant through his son Crab (or "Old Crab"), who sired Ancaster's Grasshopper, Routh's Crab, Shepherd's Crab, Cumberland's Crab, Sloe, Rib, Wynn's Spot, Gentleman, Brilliant, Black and All Black, Imported Sober John, Berie's Ramper, and Spectator. The last of these was the sire of Sulphur, Damper, and Marc Anthony, who sired Aimwell (1782), winner of the Epsom Derby of 1785. Aimwell was the only winner of the Derby not in the sire line of one of the three great Arabian foundation stallions, the Godolphin Arabian, the Darley Arabian, and the Byerley Turk.

Although his recorded sire line is extinct among Thoroughbreds, Alcock's Arabian is considered the ancestor of all grey Thoroughbred horses through his female descendants. His status as the progenitor of all grey Thoroughbreds was the subject of a question on Episode 12 of Series H of the BBC comedy panel game QI.

As Alcock's Arabian had a prominent sire line in the Thirteen Colonies - particularly Samuel Galloway III's Selim (b. 1759), the son of the Duke of Kingston's Othello, by Crab, out of Selima, by the Godolphin Arabian, a rival of Wilkins Spadille (b. 1762), a stallion by Janus II, also a grandson of the Godolphin Arabian - prior to the American Revolutionary War, but many breeding records were lost, it is remotely possible that unrecorded descendants of his sire line still exist. However, as these records were lost, it is impossible to verify or register any of these potential descendants as purebred Thoroughbreds. Wilkins Spadille was a "famous sire" of early American Quarter Horses.

== Sire line tree ==
- Alcock's Arabian
  - Tippler
  - Crab
    - Grasshopper
    - Grey Ward
    - Crab (Routh)
      - Valiant
    - Rib
      - Sober John
    - Sloe
      - Sweeper
    - Bustard
      - Dorimond
      - Gamahoe
    - Othello (Portmore)
    - Allworthy
    - Locust
      - Bucephalus
    - Why Not
    - Oroonoko
      - Brunswick
        - Black-and-all-Black
    - Spectator
      - Antaeus
      - Trophy
      - Tyrant
      - Pagan
      - Sulphur
        - Apollo
        - Little Isaac
        - Don Carlos
      - Mark Anthony
        - Brutus
        - George
        - Mark Anthony II
        - Aimwell
        - Mark-Ho
        - Bag-Ho
      - Damper
        - Ruby
        - Carrots
      - Vandal
        - Blaze
    - Brilliant
      - Antelope
        - Gem
      - Bellario
        - Philaster
        - Whirlwind
        - Borascha
        - Boots
      - Don Dun
    - Crab (Cumberland)
      - Milksop
    - Crab (Shepherd)
      - Lath (Protector)
        - Laburnum
        - Tippoo Saib
    - Othello (Kingston)
      - True Briton
      - Galloway's Selim (out of Selima)
  - Spot (Alcock)
  - Gentleman
  - Spot (Wynn)
