= Crab (horse) =

British Thoroughbred racehorse

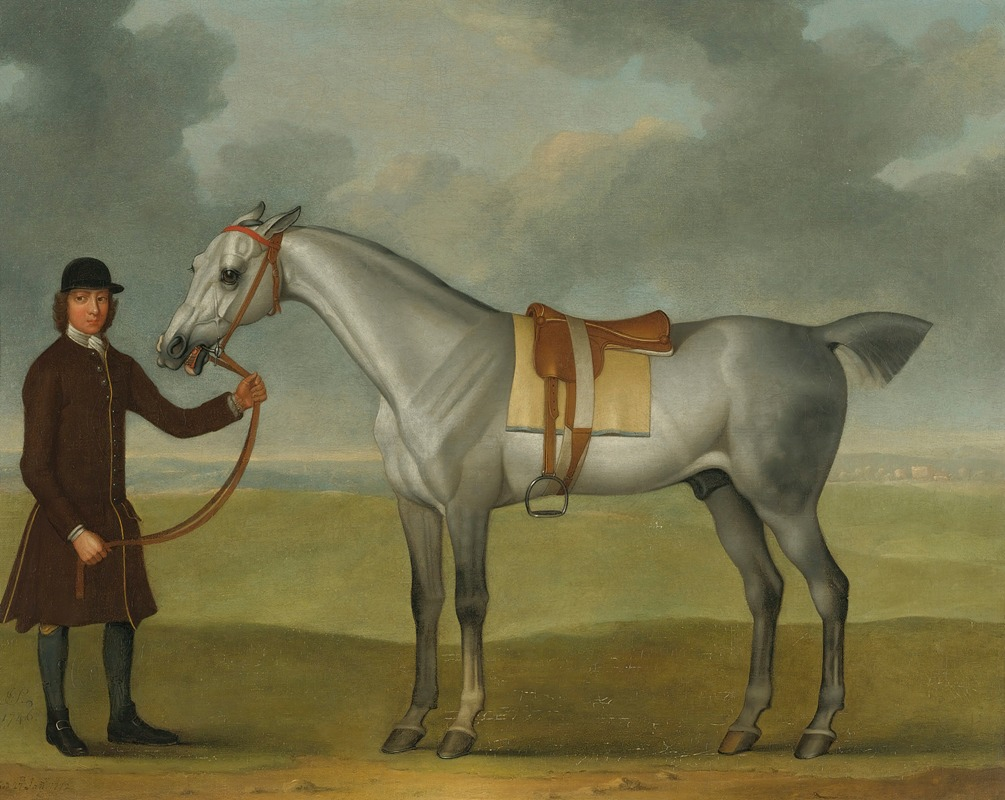
- Mr. Thomas Panton’s Crab, by James Seymour
- Sire: Alcock's Arabian
- Dam: Basto mare
- Damsire: Basto
- Sex: Stallion
- Foaled: 1722
- Country: Great Britain
- Colour: Grey
- Breeder: Charles Pelham
- Owner: 1st Earl of Portmore; Mr. Cotton; Thomas Panton

Major wins
- Match against Cleopatra (1728); Newmarket King's Plate (1729)

Awards
- Leading sire in Great Britain and Ireland (1748, 1749, 1750)

Crab also known as Old Crab and Mr. Panton's Crab (1722 – December 1750) was a British Thoroughbred racehorse. After retiring from racing he became a successful stallion and was British Champion sire in 1748, 1749 and 1750. He was owned by the 1st Earl of Portmore until purchased by Mr. Cotton and then Thomas Panton.

== Background ==
Crab was a grey colt bred by Charles Pelham and was foaled in 1722. He was a son of Alcock's Arabian out of a daughter of Basto. He was sold to David Colyear, 1st Earl of Portmore when he was young.

Although grey was a fairly common color in the foundation stock of the Thoroughbred, it became increasingly rare over time. All modern grey Thoroughbreds descend from Crab through his great-great-granddaughter Bab (foaled 1787) - a descendant of the "Crab Mare" by Crab (b. 1750) - and her great-great-grandson, Drone (1823).

== Racing career ==
Crab first race came in 1727, when he finished fourth in a 20 guineas sweepstakes at Newmarket. He was then sold to Mr. Cotton. His first intended race for Mr. Cotton was at Newmarket in April 1728 against Weaver, but Weaver's owner, Lord Milsintown, paid a forfeit and the race never took place. In the following October he beat the Duke of Bolton's Cleopatra in a 500 guineas race over four miles. In April 1729 he won the King's Plate at Newmarket, beating the Duke of Hamilton's Victorious and Mr. Williams's Spot. The following May he became lame when running in an 80 guineas plate at Stamford and never raced again.

== Stud career ==
As a stallion he stood for Thomas Panton at Newmarket. He became a successful sire and was British Champion sire in 1748, 1749 and 1750. His progeny included King's Plate winners Brilliant, Bustard, Grasshopper, Othello, Sloe and Spinster. Crab died in December 1750.

== Sire line tree ==
- Crab
  - Grasshopper
  - Grey Ward
  - Crab (Routh)
    - Valiant
  - Rib
    - Sober John
  - Sloe
    - Sweeper
  - Bustard
    - Dorimond
    - Gamahoe
  - Othello (Portmore)
  - Allworthy
  - Locust
    - Bucephalus
  - Why Not
  - Oroonoko
    - Brunswick
      - Black-and-all-Black
  - Spectator
    - Pagan
    - Sulphur
    - Mark Anthony
      - Aimwell
    - Vandal
  - Brilliant
    - Antelope
      - Gem
    - Bellario
      - Philaster
      - Whirlwind
      - Borascha
      - Boots
    - Don Dun
  - Crab (Cumberland)
    - Milksop
  - Crab (Shepherd)
    - Lath (Protector)
      - Laburnum
      - Tippoo Saib
  - Othello (Kingston)
    - True Briton
    - Selim

== Pedigree ==
Pedigree of Crab, grey stallion, 1722
| Sire Alcock's Arabian | Curwen's Bay Barb* | (unknown) | (unknown) |
| Sire Alcock's Arabian | Curwen's Bay Barb* | (unknown) | (unknown) |
| Sire Alcock's Arabian | Curwen's Bay Barb* | (unknown) | (unknown) |
| Sire Alcock's Arabian | Curwen's Bay Barb* | (unknown) | (unknown) |
| Sire Alcock's Arabian | Old Wen mare | Hautboy | D'Arcy White Turk |
| Sire Alcock's Arabian | Old Wen mare | Hautboy | Royal mare |
| Sire Alcock's Arabian | Old Wen mare | Miss Darcy's Pet mare | (unknown) |
| Sire Alcock's Arabian | Old Wen mare | Miss Darcy's Pet mare | Sedbury Royal mare |
| Dam Basto mare | Basto | Byerley Turk | (unknown) |
| Dam Basto mare | Basto | Byerley Turk | (unknown) |
| Dam Basto mare | Basto | Bay Peg | Leedes Arabian |
| Dam Basto mare | Basto | Bay Peg | Young Bald Peg |
| Dam Basto mare | Sister to Mixbury | Curwen's Bay Barb* | (unknown) |
| Dam Basto mare | Sister to Mixbury | Curwen's Bay Barb* | (unknown) |
| Dam Basto mare | Sister to Mixbury | Curwen Spot mare | Curwen's Old Spot |
| Dam Basto mare | Sister to Mixbury | Curwen Spot mare | Lowther Barb mare |

* Crab is inbred 2S × 3D to the stallion Curwen's Bay Barb, meaning that he appears second generation on the sire side of his pedigree and third generation on the dam side of his pedigree.
