= Curwen's Bay Barb =

Foundation sire of the Thoroughbred breed

- Sex: Stallion
- Foaled: c. 1690
- Died: c. 1728
- Colour: Bay
- Owner: Henry Curwen

Curwen's Bay Barb (c. 1690 – c. 1728) was a foundation sire of the Thoroughbred breed. A bay horse with a white blaze, he was imported by Henry Curwen in 1698 from France. He had originally been a present to Louis XIV from the King of Morocco. One of his early sons, Mixbury, stood just over 13 hands high and apparently "there were not more that two horses of his day that could beat him under light wrights". He also sired Tantivy, Brocklesby, Brocklesby Betty, Creeping Molly and the top stallion Hip. It has also been suggested that he may have been the sire of Alcock's Arabian.

His sire line is extinct, but he made a significant contribution to the Thoroughbred breed. The three traditional foundation sires whose sire lines still exist today were Darley Arabian, Godolphin Arabian and Byerley Turk. However Curwen's Bay Barb contributed significantly to the breed through other lines of descent. Modern Thoroughbred's tend to have most crosses to Godolphin Arabian (contributing 13.8%), then Darley Arabian (6.5%), Curwen's Bay Barb (4.2%) and Byerley Turk (3.3%).

== Sire line tree ==
- Curwen's Bay Barb
  - Blossum
  - Flatface
  - Brocklesby
  - Hip
    - Hartleys Roan Horse
    - Windsor
    - Grantham
  - Mixbury Galloway
    - Harlequin
      - Little-Thought-On
  - Monkey
  - Alcock's Arabian
    - Tippler
    - Crab
      - Grasshopper
      - Grey Ward
      - Crab (Routh)
        - Valiant
      - Rib
        - Sober John
      - Sloe
        - Sweeper
      - Bustard
        - Dorimond
        - Gamahoe
      - Othello (Portmore)
      - Allworthy
      - Locust
        - Bucephalus
      - Why Not
      - Oroonoko
        - Brunswick
      - Spectator
        - Pagan
        - Sulphur
        - Mark Anthony
        - Vandal
      - Brilliant
        - Antelope
        - Bellario
        - Don Dun
      - Crab (Cumberland)
        - Milksop
      - Crab (Shepherd)
        - Lath (Protector)
      - Othello (Kingston)
        - True Briton
        - Selim
    - Spot (Alcock)
    - Gentleman
    - Spot (Wynn)
