= Thoroughbred =

Horse breed developed for racing

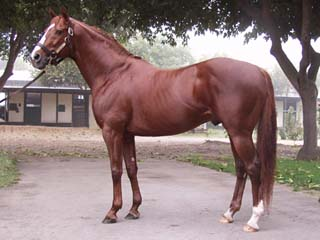

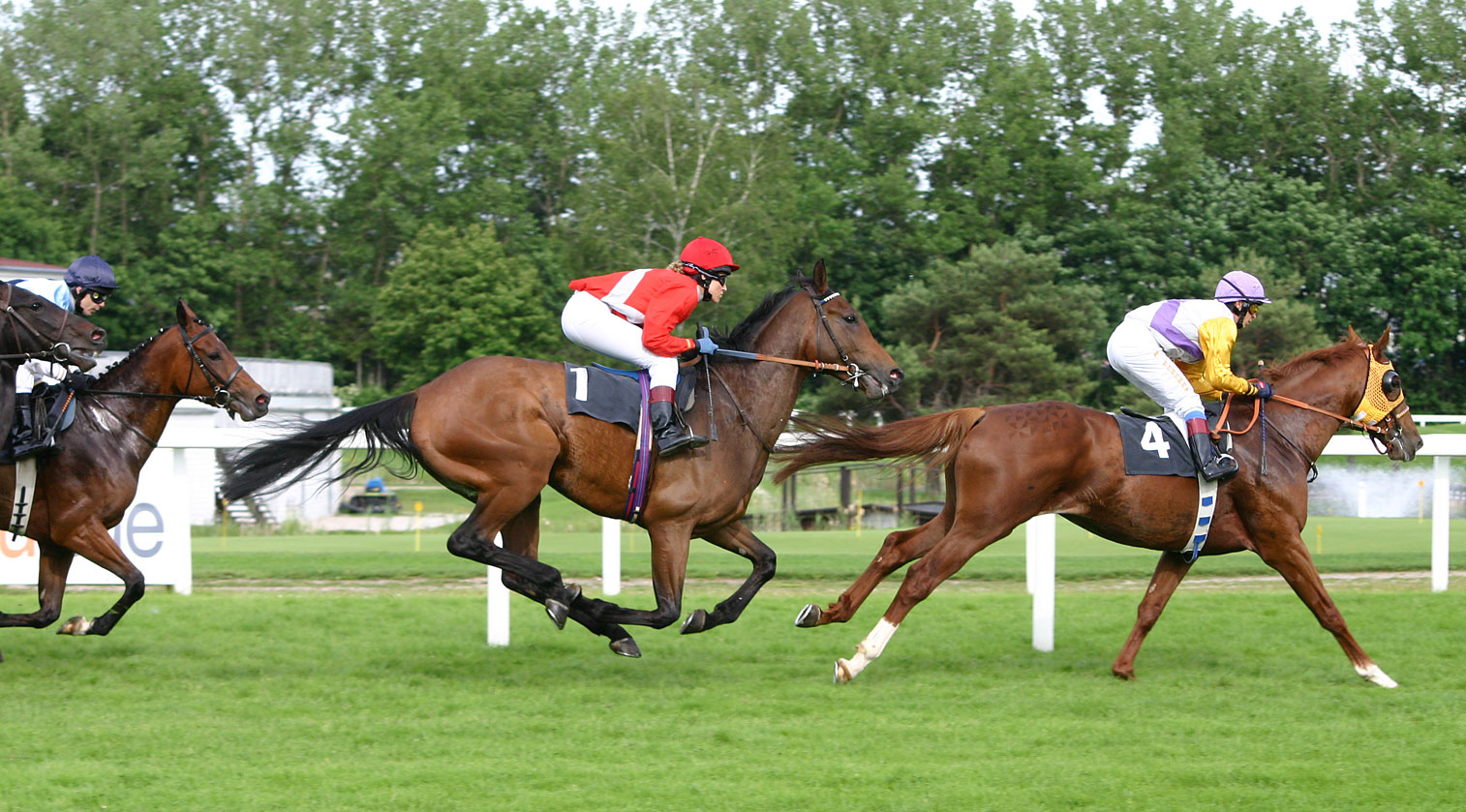
- Other names: TB/Tb (abbreviation); Bloodhorse
- Country of origin: England

Traits
- Distinguishing features: Athletic riding horse breed, used for racing and many equestrian sports

Breed standards
- The Jockey Club (US); Australian Stud Book; General Stud Book

The Thoroughbred is a horse breed developed for horse racing. Although the word thoroughbred is sometimes used to refer to any breed of purebred horse, it technically refers only to the Thoroughbred breed. Thoroughbreds are considered "hot-blooded" horses that are known for their agility, speed, and spirit.

The Thoroughbred was developed in 17th- and 18th-century England, when native mares were crossbred with imported stallions of Arabian, Barb, and Turkoman breeding. All modern Thoroughbreds can trace their pedigrees to three stallions originally imported into England in the 17th and 18th centuries, and to a larger number of foundation mares of mostly English breeding. During the 18th and 19th centuries, the Thoroughbred breed spread throughout the world; they were imported into North America starting in 1730 and into Australia, Europe, Japan and South America during the 19th century. Millions of Thoroughbreds exist today, and around 100,000 foals are registered each year worldwide.

Thoroughbreds are used mainly for racing, but are also bred for other riding disciplines such as show jumping, combined training, dressage, polo, and fox hunting. They are also commonly crossbred to create new breeds or to improve existing ones, and have been influential in the creation of the Quarter Horse, Standardbred, Anglo-Arabian, and various warmblood breeds.

Thoroughbred racehorses perform with maximum exertion, which has resulted in high accident rates and health problems such as bleeding from the lungs. Other health concerns include low fertility, abnormally small hearts, and a small hoof-to-body-mass ratio. There are several theories for the reasons behind the prevalence of accidents and health problems in the Thoroughbred breed, and research on the subject is ongoing.

== Breed characteristics ==
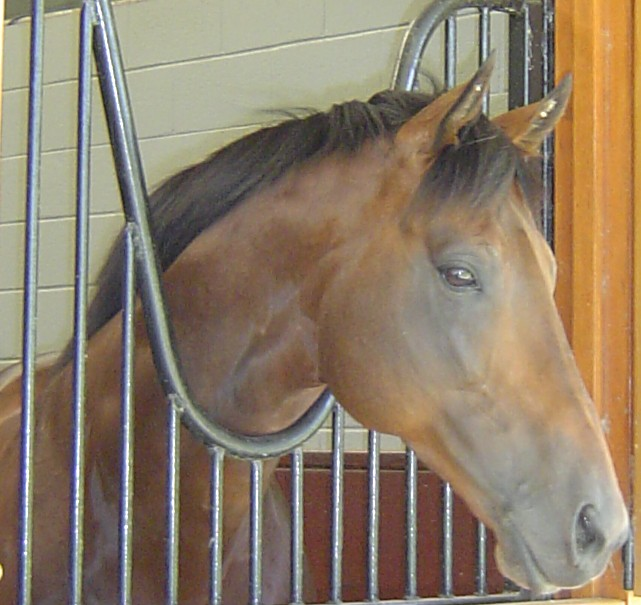
Thoroughbreds have a well-chiseled head.

The typical Thoroughbred ranges from 15.2 to 17.0 hands (62 to 68 inches, 157 to 173 cm) high, averaging 16 hands (64 inches, 163 cm). They are most often bay, dark bay or brown, chestnut, black, or gray. Less common colors recognized in the United States include roan and palomino. White is very rare, but is a recognized color separate from gray. The face and lower legs may be marked with white, but white will generally not appear on the body. Coat patterns that have more than one color on the body, such as Pinto or Appaloosa, are not recognized by mainstream breed registries. Good-quality Thoroughbreds have a well-chiseled head on a long neck, high withers, a deep chest, a short back, good depth of hindquarters, a lean body, and long legs. Thoroughbreds are classified among the "hot-blooded" breeds, which are animals bred for agility and speed and are generally considered spirited and bold.

Thoroughbreds born in the Northern Hemisphere are officially considered a year older on the first of January each year; those born in the Southern Hemisphere officially are one year older on the first of August. These artificial dates have been set to enable the standardization of races and other competitions for horses in certain age groups.

== Terminology ==
The Thoroughbred is a distinct breed of horse, although people sometimes refer to a purebred horse of any breed as a thoroughbred. The term for any horse or other animal derived from a single breed line is purebred. While the term probably came into general use because the English Thoroughbred's General Stud Book was one of the first breed registries created, in modern usage horse breeders consider it incorrect to refer to any animal as a thoroughbred except for horses belonging to the Thoroughbred breed. Nonetheless, breeders of other species of purebred animals may use the two terms interchangeably, though thoroughbred is less often used for describing purebred animals of other species. The term is a proper noun referring to this specific breed, though often not capitalized, especially in non-specialist publications, and outside the US. For example, the Australian Stud Book, The New York Times, and the BBC do not capitalize the word.

== History ==
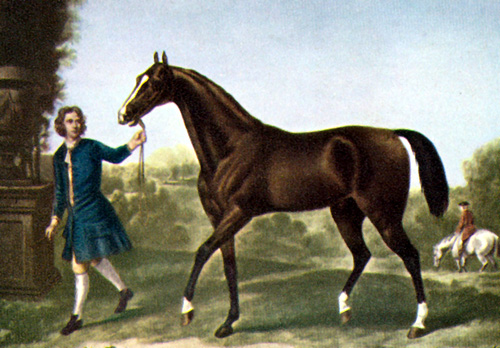
The Darley Arabian, one of the three traditional foundation sires of the Thoroughbred

=== Beginnings in England ===
==== Early racing ====
Flat racing existed in England by at least 1174, when four-mile races took place at Smithfield, in London. Racing continued at fairs and markets throughout the Middle Ages and into the reign of King James I of England. It was then that handicapping, a system of adding weight to attempt to equalize a horse's chances of winning as well as improved training procedures, began to be used. During the reigns of Charles II, William III, Anne, and George I, the foundation of the Thoroughbred was laid. The term "thro-bred" to describe horses was first used in 1713.

Under Charles II, a keen racegoer and owner, and Anne, royal support was given to racing and the breeding of race horses. With royal support, horse racing became popular with the public, and by 1727, a newspaper devoted to racing, the Racing Calendar, was founded. Devoted exclusively to the sport, it recorded race results and advertised upcoming meets.

==== Foundation stallions ====
All modern Thoroughbreds trace back to three stallions imported into England from the Middle East in the late 17th and early 18th centuries: the Byerley Turk (1680s), the Darley Arabian (1704), and the Godolphin Arabian (1729). Other imported stallions were less influential, but still made noteworthy contributions to the breed. These included the Alcock's Arabian, D'Arcy's White Turk, Leedes Arabian, and Curwen's Bay Barb. (Note: Articles on the mentioned horses are located at Peters, Anne. "Foundation Sires of the Thoroughbred: D'Arcy's White Turk". Foundation Sires of the Thoroughbred. Thoroughbred Heritage., "Foundation Sires of the Thoroughbred: L". Foundation Sires of the Thoroughbred. Thoroughbred Heritage., Peters, Anne. "Foundation Sires of the Thoroughbred: Curwen's Bay Barb". Foundation Sires of the Thoroughbred. Thoroughbred Heritage.) Another was the Brownlow Turk, who, among other attributes, is thought to be largely responsible for the gray coat color in Thoroughbreds. In all, about 160 stallions have been traced in the historical record as contributing to the creation of the Thoroughbred. The addition of horses of Eastern bloodlines, whether Arabian, Barb, or Turk, to the native English mares ultimately led to the creation of the General Stud Book (GSB) in 1791 and the practice of official registration of horses. According to Peter Willett, about 50% of the foundation stallions appear to have been of Arabian bloodlines, with the remainder being evenly divided between Turkoman and Barb breeding. (Note: The identification of exact breeding for most of the foundation stallions is complicated by the practice in the 17th and 18th centuries of calling a horse an Arab or a Barb based on where the horse was acquired, rather than from its actual breeding.)

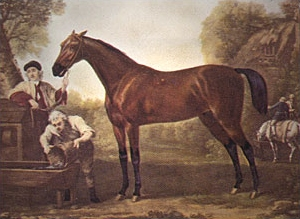
Matchem, a grandson of the Godolphin Arabian, from a painting by George Stubbs

Each of the three major foundation sires was, coincidentally, the ancestor of a grandson or great-great-grandson who was the only male descendant to perpetuate each respective horse's male line: Matchem was the only descendant of his grandsire, the Godolphin Arabian, to maintain a male line to the present; the Byerley Turk's male line was preserved by Herod (or King Herod), a great-great-grandson; and the male line of the Darley Arabian owes its existence to great-great-grandson Eclipse, who was the dominant racehorse of his day and never defeated. One genetic study indicates that 95% of all male Thoroughbreds trace their direct male line (via the Y chromosome) to the Darley Arabian.

However, in modern Thoroughbred pedigrees, most horses have more crosses to the Godolphin Arabian (13.8%) than to the Darley Arabian (6.5%) when all lines of descent (maternal and paternal) are considered. Further, as a percentage of contributions to current Thoroughbred bloodlines, Curwen's Bay Barb (4.2%) appears more often than the Byerley Turk (3.3%). The majority of modern Thoroughbreds alive today trace to a total of only 27 or 28 stallions from the 18th and 19th centuries.

==== Foundation mares ====
The mares used as foundation breeding stock came from a variety of breeds, some of which, such as the Irish Hobby, had developed in northern Europe prior to the 13th century. Other mares were of oriental breeding, including Barb, Turk and other bloodlines, although most researchers conclude that the number of Eastern mares imported into England during the 100 years after 1660 was small. The 19th-century researcher Bruce Lowe identified 50 mare "families" in the Thoroughbred breed, later augmented by other researchers to 74. However, it is probable that fewer genetically unique mare lines existed than Lowe identified. Recent studies of the mtDNA of Thoroughbred mares indicate that some of the mare lines thought to be genetically distinct may actually have had a common ancestor; in 19 mare lines studied, the haplotypes revealed that they traced to only 15 unique foundation mares, suggesting either a common ancestor for foundation mares thought to be unrelated or recording errors in the GSB.

=== Later development in Britain ===
By the end of the 18th century, the English Classic races had been established. These are the St. Leger Stakes, founded in 1776, The Oaks, founded in 1779, and The Derby in 1780. Later, the 2,000 Guineas Stakes and the 1,000 Guineas Stakes were founded in 1809 and 1814. The 1,000 Guineas and the Oaks are restricted to fillies, but the others are open to racehorses of either sex aged three years. The distances of these races, ranging from one mile (1.6 km) to 1.75 miles (2.82 km), led to a change in breeding practices, as breeders concentrated on producing horses that could race at a younger age than in the past and that had more speed. In the early 18th century, the emphasis had been on longer races, up to 4 miles (6.4 km), that were run in multiple heats. The older style of race favored older horses, but with the change in distances, younger horses became preferred.

Selective breeding for speed and racing ability led to improvements in the size of horses and winning times by the middle of the 19th century. Bay Middleton, a winner of the Epsom Derby, stood over 16 hands high, a full hand higher than the Darley Arabian. Winning times had improved to such a degree that many felt further improvement by adding additional Arabian bloodlines was impossible. This was borne out in 1885, when a race was held between a Thoroughbred, Iambic, considered a mid-grade runner, and the best Arabian of the time, Asil. The race was over 3 miles (4,800 m), and although Iambic was handicapped by carrying 4.5 stone (29 kg; 63 lb) more than Asil, he still managed to beat Asil by 20 lengths. The improvement of the breed for racing in this way was said by noted 19th century racing writer, Nimrod, to have created "the noblest animal in the creation".

An aspect of the modern British breeding establishment is that they breed not only for flat racing, but also for steeplechasing. Up until the end of the 19th century, Thoroughbreds were bred not only for racing but also as saddle horses.

Soon after the start of the 20th century, fears that the English races would be overrun with American-bred Thoroughbreds because of the closing of US racetracks in the early 1910s, led to the Jersey Act of 1913. It prohibited the registration of any horse in the General Stud Book (GSB) if they could not show that every ancestor traced to the GSB. This excluded most American-bred horses, because the 100-year gap between the founding of the GSB and the American Stud Book meant that most American-bred horses possessed at least one or two crosses to horses not registered in the GSB. The act was not repealed until 1949, after which a horse was only required to show that all its ancestors to the ninth generation were registered in a recognized Stud Book. Many felt that the Jersey Act hampered the development of the British Thoroughbred by preventing breeders in the United Kingdom from using new bloodlines developed outside the British Isles.

=== In America ===
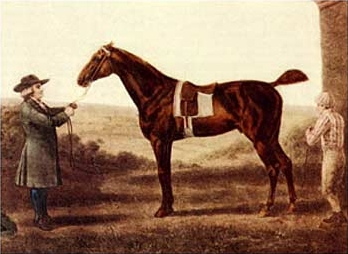
Diomed, an important sire in American Thoroughbred breeding.

The first Thoroughbred horse in the American Colonies was Bulle Rock, imported in 1730. Maryland and Virginia were the centers of Colonial Thoroughbred breeding, along with South Carolina and New York. During the American Revolution importations of horses from England practically stopped but were restarted after the signing of a peace treaty. Two important stallions were imported around the time of the Revolution; Messenger in 1788 and Diomed before that.

Messenger left little impact on the American Thoroughbred, but is considered a foundation sire of the Standardbred breed. Diomed, who won the Derby Stakes in 1780, had a significant impact on American Thoroughbred breeding, mainly through his son Sir Archy. John F. Wall, a racing historian, said that Sir Archy was the "first outstanding stallion we can claim as native American". He was retired from the racetrack because of lack of opponents. Medley and Shark, who arrived in the United States before Messenger and Diomed, became important broodmare and dam sires by producing foundation stock, and their daughters and granddaughters were bred primarily to Diomed.

After the American Revolution, the center of Thoroughbred breeding and racing in the United States moved west. Kentucky and Tennessee became significant centers. Andrew Jackson, later President of the United States, bred and raced Thoroughbreds at his Hermitage Plantation near Nashville, Tennessee. Match races held in the early 19th century helped to popularize horse racing in the United States. One took place in 1823, in Long Island, New York, between Sir Henry and American Eclipse. Another was a match race between Boston and Fashion in 1838 that featured bets of $20,000 from each side. The last major match races before the American Civil War were both between Lexington and Lecompte. The first was held in 1854 in New Orleans and was won by Lecompte. Lexington's owner then challenged Lecompte's owner to a rematch, held in 1855 in New Orleans and won by Lexington. Both of these horses were sons of Boston, a descendant of Sir Archy. Lexington went on to a career as a breeding stallion, and led the sires list of number of winners for sixteen years, fourteen of them in a row.

After the American Civil War, the emphasis in American racing changed from the older style of four-mile (6 km) races in which the horses ran in at least two heats. The new style of racing involved shorter races not run in heats, over distances from five furlongs up to 1.5 miles (2.4 km). This development meant a change in breeding practices, as well as the age that horses were raced, with younger horses and sprinters coming to the fore. It was also after the Civil War that the American Thoroughbred returned to England to race. Iroquois became the first American-bred winner of the Epsom Derby in 1881. The success of American-bred Thoroughbreds in England led to the Jersey Act in 1913, which limited the importation of American Thoroughbreds into England. After World War I, the breeders in America continued to emphasize speed and early racing age but also imported horses from England, and this trend continued past World War II. After World War II, Thoroughbred breeding remained centered in Kentucky, but California, New York, and Florida also emerged as important racing and breeding centers.

Thoroughbreds in the United States have historically been used not only for racing but also to improve other breeds. The early import Messenger was the foundation of the Standardbred, and Thoroughbred blood was also instrumental in the development of the American Quarter Horse. The foundation stallion of the Morgan breed is held by some to have been sired by a Thoroughbred. Between World War I and World War II, the U.S. Army used Thoroughbred stallions as part of their Remount Service, which was designed to improve the stock of cavalry mounts.

=== In Europe ===
Thoroughbreds began to be imported to France in 1817 and 1818 with the importation of a number of stallions from England, but initially the sport of horse racing did not prosper in France. The first Jockey Club in France was not formed until 1833, and in 1834 the racing and regulation functions were split off to a new society, the Société d'Encouragement pour l'Amélioration des Races de Chevaux en France, better known as the Jockey-Club de Paris. The French Stud Book was founded at the same time by the government. By 1876, French-bred Thoroughbreds were regularly winning races in England, and in that year a French breeder-owner earned the most money in England on the track. World War I almost destroyed French breeding because of war damage and lack of races. After the war, the premier French race, the Grand Prix, resumed and continues to this day. During World War II, French Thoroughbred breeding did not suffer as it had during the first World War, and thus was able to compete on an equal footing with other countries after the war.

Organized racing in Italy started in 1837, when race meets were established in Florence and Naples and a meet in Milan was founded in 1842. Modern flat racing came to Rome in 1868. Later importations, including the Derby Stakes winners Ellington (1856) and Melton (1885), came to Italy before the end of the 19th century. Modern Thoroughbred breeding in Italy is mostly associated with the breeding program of Federico Tesio, who started his breeding program in 1898. Tesio was the breeder of Nearco, one of the dominant sires of Thoroughbreds in the later part of the 20th century.

Other countries in Europe have Thoroughbred breeding programs, including Germany, Russia, Poland, and Hungary.

=== In Australia and New Zealand ===
Horses arrived in Australia with the First Fleet in 1788 along with the earliest colonists. Although horses of part-Thoroughbred blood were imported into Australia during the late 18th century, it is thought that the first pureblood Thoroughbred was a stallion named Northumberland who was imported from England in 1802 as a coach horse sire. By 1810, the first formal race meets were organized in Sydney, and by 1825 the first mare of proven Thoroughbred bloodlines arrived to join the Thoroughbred stallions already there. In 1825, the Sydney Turf Club, the first true racing club in Australia, was formed. Throughout the 1830s, the Australian colonies began to import Thoroughbreds, almost exclusively for racing purposes, and to improve the local stock. Each colony formed its own racing clubs and held its own races. Gradually, the individual clubs were integrated into one overarching organization, now known as the Australian Racing Board. Thoroughbreds from Australia were imported into New Zealand in the 1840s and 1850s, with the first direct importation from England occurring in 1862.

=== In other areas ===
Thoroughbreds have been exported to many other areas of the world since the breed was created. Oriental horses were imported into South Africa from the late 17th century in order to improve the local stock through crossbreeding. Horse racing was established there in the late 18th and early 19th centuries, and Thoroughbreds were imported in increasing numbers. The first Thoroughbred stallions arrived in Argentina in 1853, but the first mares did not arrive until 1865. The Argentine Stud Book was first published in 1893. Thoroughbreds were imported into Japan from 1895, although it was not until after World War II that Japan began a serious breeding and racing business involving Thoroughbreds.

== Registration, breeding, and population ==
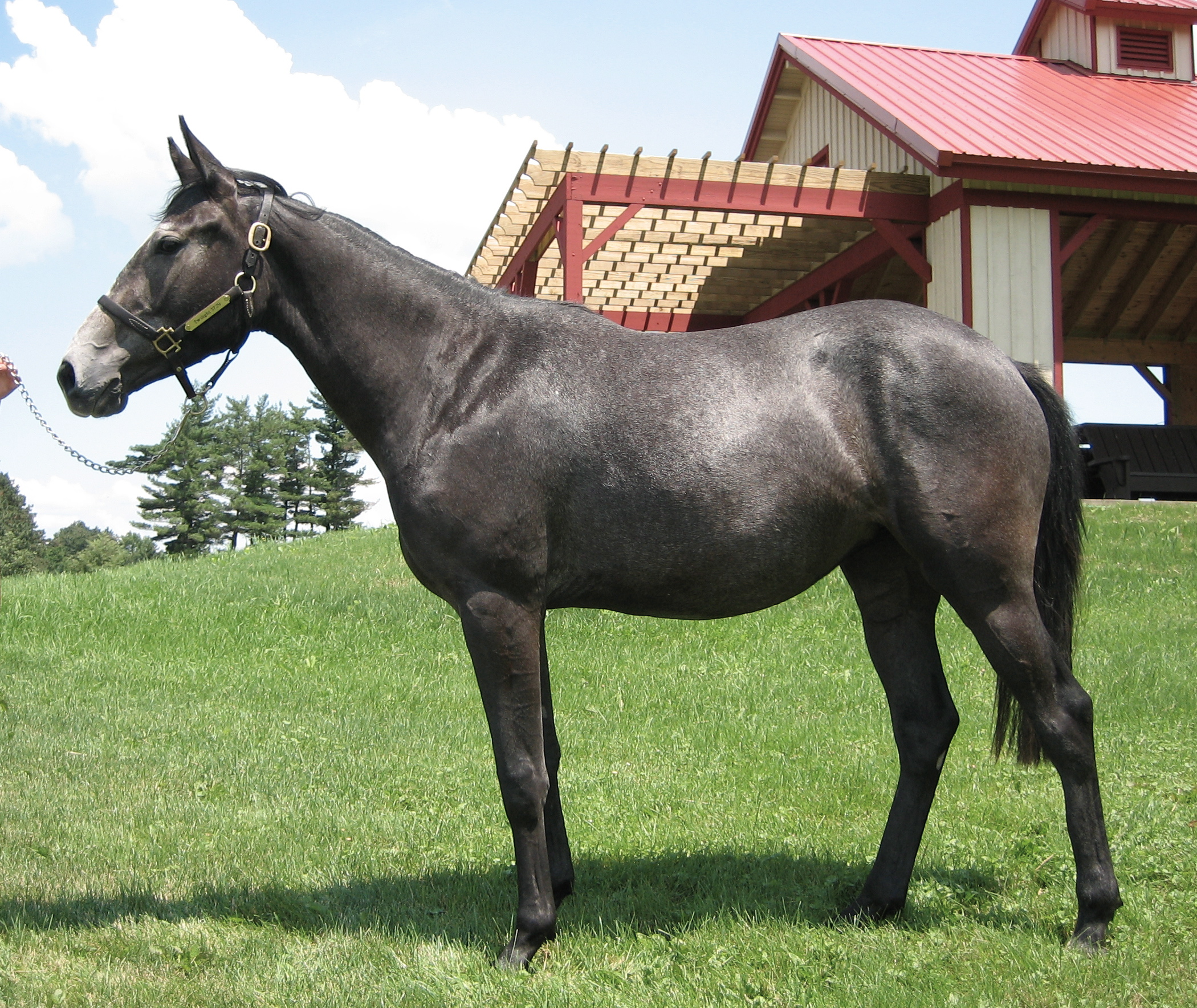
Twilight, the Thoroughbred mare who serves as the subject of the Horse Genome Project

The number of Thoroughbred foals registered each year in North America varies greatly, chiefly linked to the success of the auction market which in turn depends on the state of the economy. The foal crop was over 44,000 in 1990, but declined to roughly 22,500 by 2014. The largest numbers are registered in the states of Kentucky, Florida and California. (Note: Note that some 2006 promotional materials from The Jockey Club state that there are slightly under 1.3 million Thoroughbreds in the United States registered with The Jockey Club, but combining this information with figures on foal registrations gives an average lifespan for registered Thoroughbreds of almost 35 years, which is well beyond normal for horses.) Australia is the second largest producer of Thoroughbreds in the world with almost 30,000 broodmares producing about 18,250 foals annually. Britain produces about 5,000 foals a year, and worldwide, there are more than 195,000 active broodmares, or females being used for breeding, and 118,000 newly registered foals in 2006 alone. The Thoroughbred industry is a large agribusiness, generating around $34 billion in revenue annually in the United States and providing about 470,000 jobs through a network of farms, training centers, and race tracks.

Unlike a significant number of registered breeds today, a horse cannot be registered as a Thoroughbred (with The Jockey Club registry) unless conceived by live cover, the witnessed natural mating of a mare and a stallion. Artificial insemination (AI) and embryo transfer (ET), though commonly used and allowable in many other horse breed registries, cannot be used with Thoroughbreds. One reason is that a greater possibility of error exists in assigning parentage with artificial insemination, and although DNA and blood testing eliminate many of those concerns, artificial insemination still requires more detailed record keeping. The main reason, however, may be economic; a stallion has a limited number of mares who can be serviced by live cover. Thus the practice prevents an oversupply of Thoroughbreds, although modern management still allows a stallion to live cover more mares in a season than was once thought possible. As an example, in 2008, the Australian stallion Encosta De Lago covered 227 mares. By allowing a stallion to cover only a couple of hundred mares a year rather than the couple of thousand possible with artificial insemination, it also preserves the high prices paid for horses of the finest or most popular lineages.

Concern exists that the closed stud book and tightly regulated population of the Thoroughbred is at risk of loss of genetic diversity because of the level of inadvertent inbreeding inevitable in such a small population. According to one study, 78% of alleles in the current population can be traced to 30 foundation animals, 27 of which are male. Ten foundation mares account for 72% of maternal (tail-female) lineages, and, as noted above, one stallion appears in 95% of tail-male lineages. Thoroughbred pedigrees are generally traced through the maternal line, called the distaff line. The line that a horse comes from is a critical factor in determining the price for a young horse.

== Value ==
Prices of Thoroughbreds vary greatly, depending on age, pedigree, conformation, and other market factors. In 2007, Keeneland Sales, a United States-based sales company, sold 9,124 horses at auction, with a total value of $814,401,000, which gives an average price of $89,259. As a whole for the United States in 2007, The Jockey Club auction statistics indicated that the average weanling sold for $44,407, the average yearling sold for $55,300, average sale price for two-year-olds was $61,843, broodmares averaged $70,150, and horses over two and broodmare prospects sold for an average of $53,243. For Europe, the July 2007 Tattersall's Sale sold 593 horses at auction, with a total for the sale of 10,951,300 guineas, for an average of 18,468 guineas. Also in 2007, Doncaster Bloodstock Sales, another British sales firm, sold 2,248 horses for a total value of 43,033,881 guineas, making an average of 15,110 guineas per horse. Australian prices at auction during the 2007–2008 racing and breeding season were as follows: 1,223 Australian weanlings sold for a total of $31,352,000, an average of $25,635 each. Four thousand, nine hundred and three yearlings sold for a total value of A$372,003,961, an average of A$75,853. Five hundred two-year-olds sold for A$13,030,150, an average of A$26,060, and 2,118 broodmares totalled A$107,720,775, an average of A$50,860.

Averages, however, can be deceiving. For example, at the 2007 Fall Yearling sale at Keeneland, 3,799 young horses sold for a total of $385,018,600, for an average of $101,347 per horse. However, that average sales price reflected a variation that included at least 19 horses that sold for only $1,000 each and 34 that sold for over $1,000,000 apiece.

The highest price paid at auction for a Thoroughbred was set in 2006 at $16,000,000 for a two-year-old colt named The Green Monkey. Record prices at auction often grab headlines, though they do not necessarily reflect the animal's future success; in the case of The Green Monkey, injuries limited him to only three career starts before being retired to stud in 2008, and he never won a race. Conversely, even a highly successful Thoroughbred may be sold by the pound for a few hundred dollars to become horsemeat. The best-known example of this was the 1986 Kentucky Derby winner Ferdinand, exported to Japan to stand at stud, but was ultimately slaughtered in 2002, presumably for pet food.

However, the value of a Thoroughbred may also be influenced by the purse money it wins. In 2007, Thoroughbred racehorses earned a total of $1,217,854,602 in all placings, an average earnings per starter of $16,924. In addition, the track record of a race horse may influence its future value as a breeding animal.

Stud fees for stallions that enter breeding can range from $2,500 to $500,000 per mare in the United States, and from £2000 to £350,000 in Britain (for the excellent sire Frankel, the highest-rated colt ever to race in Britain).

The record stud fee to date was set in the 1980s, when the stud fee of the late Northern Dancer reached $1 million. During the 2008 Australian breeding season seven stallions stood at a stud fee of A$110,000 or more, with the highest fee in the nation at A$302,500.

== Uses ==
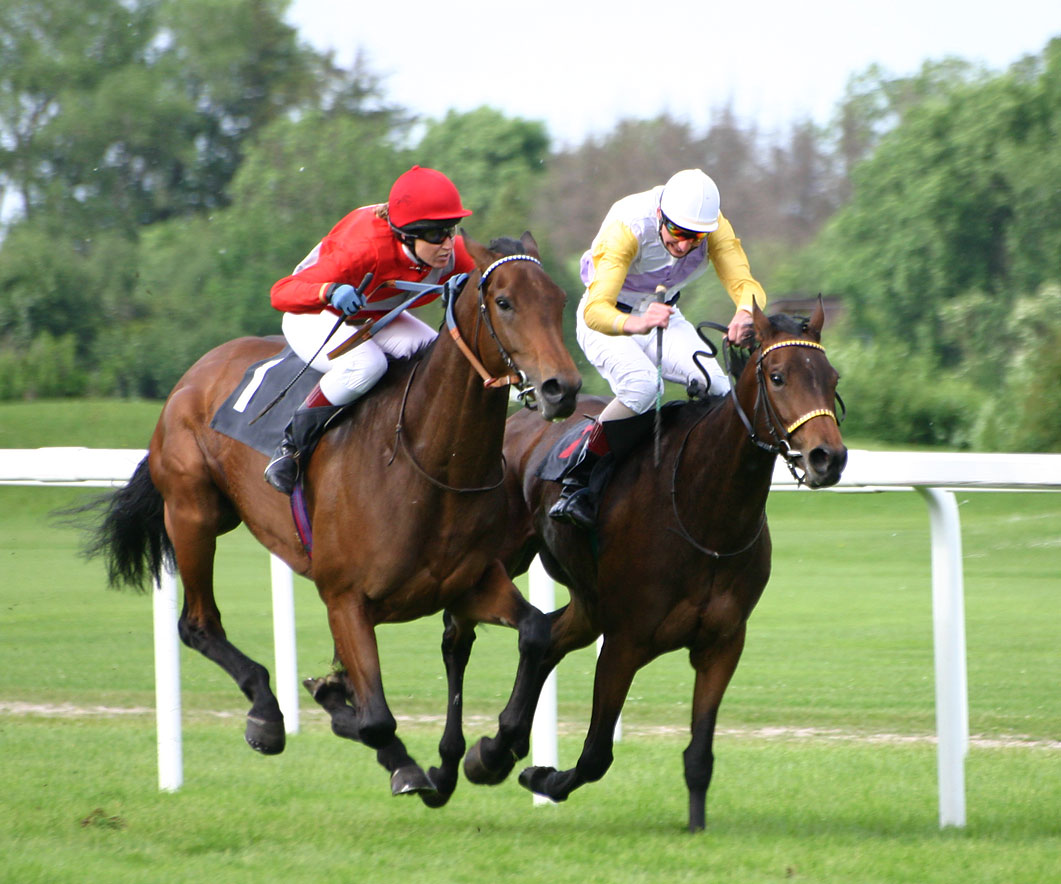
Race horses competing on turf (grass racetrack) in Germany. Most races in Europe are run on turf, while most races in North America are run on dirt.

Although the Thoroughbred is primarily bred for racing, the breed is also used for show jumping and combined training because of its athleticism, and many retired and retrained race horses become fine family riding horses, dressage horses, and youth show horses. The larger horses are sought after for hunter/jumper and dressage competitions, whereas the smaller horses are in demand as polo ponies.

=== Horse racing ===
Thoroughbred horses are primarily bred for racing under saddle at the gallop. Thoroughbreds are often known for being either distance runners or sprinters, and their conformation usually reflects what they have been bred to do. Sprinters are usually well muscled, while stayers, or distance runners, tend to be smaller and slimmer. The size of the horse is one consideration for buyers and trainers when choosing a potential racehorse. Although there have been champion racehorses of every height, from Zenyatta who stood 17.2 hands, to Man o' War and Secretariat who both stood at 16.2 hands, down to Hyperion, who was only 15.1, the best racehorses are generally of average size. Larger horses mature more slowly and have more stress on their legs and feet, predisposing them to lameness. Smaller horses are considered by some to be at a disadvantage due to their shorter stride and a tendency of other horses to bump them, especially in the starting gate. Historically, Thoroughbreds have steadily increased in size: the average height of a Thoroughbred in 1700 was about 13.3 hands high. By 1876 this had increased to 15.3.

In 2007, there were 71,959 horses who started in races in the United States, and the average Thoroughbred racehorse in the United States and Canada ran 6.33 times in that year. In Australia, there were 31,416 horses in training during 2007, and those horses started 194,066 times for A$375,512,579 of prize money. During 2007, in Japan, there were 23,859 horses in training and those horses started 182,614 times for A$857,446,268 of prize money. In Britain, the British Racing Authority states there were 8,556 horses in training for flat racing for 2007, and those horses started 60,081 times in 5,659 races.

Statistically, fewer than 50% of all race horses ever win a race, and less than 1% ever win a stakes race such as the Kentucky Derby or Epsom Derby. Any horse who has yet to win a race is known as a maiden.

Horses finished with a racing career that are not suitable for breeding purposes often become riding horses or other equine companions. A number of agencies exist to help make the transition from the racetrack to another career, or to help find retirement homes for ex-racehorses.

=== Other disciplines ===
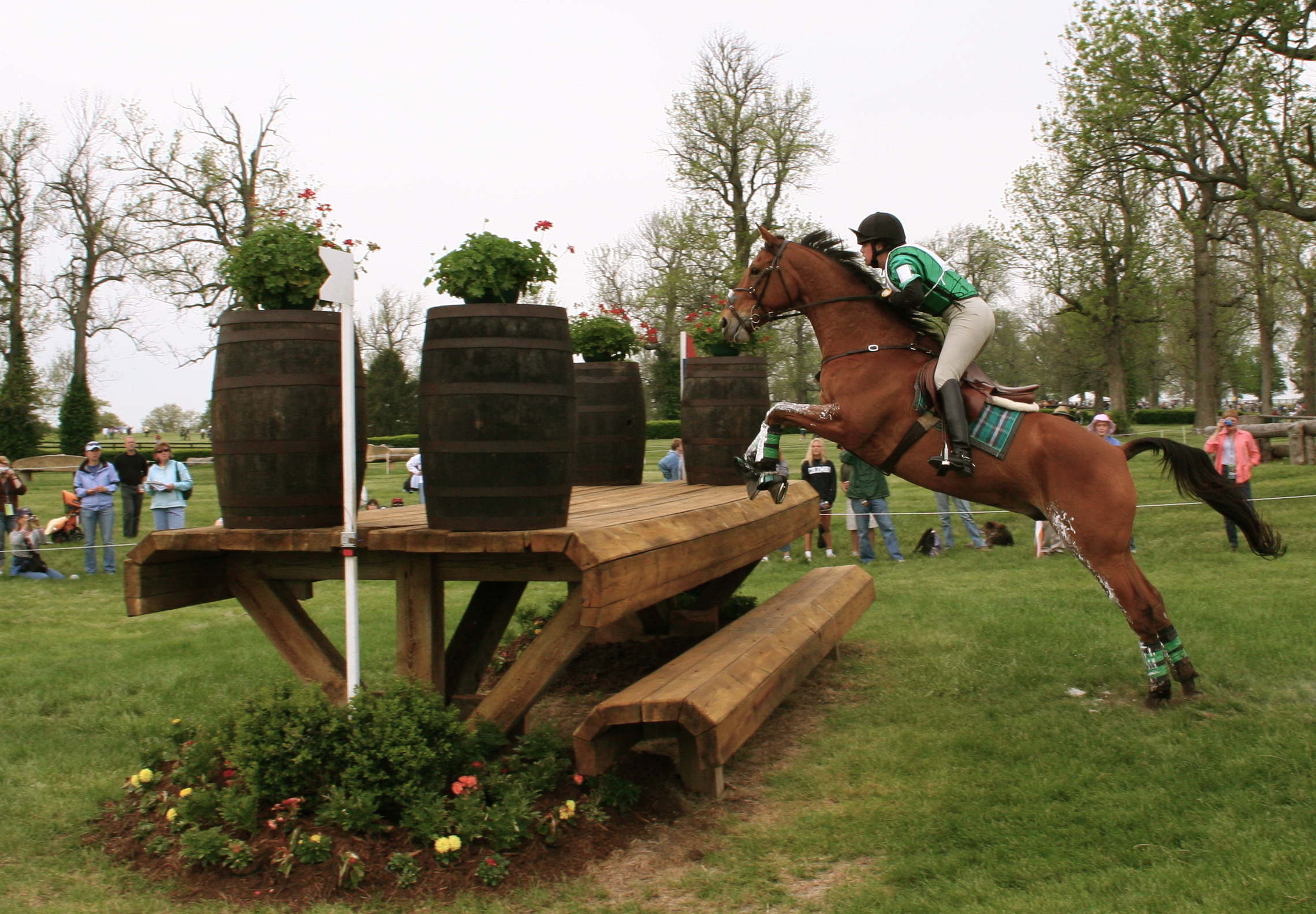
A Thoroughbred competing in eventing

In addition to racing, Thoroughbreds compete in eventing, show jumping and dressage at the highest levels of international competition, including the Olympics. They are also used as show hunters, steeplechasers, and in Western riding speed events such as barrel racing. Mounted police divisions employ them in non-competitive work, and recreational riders also use them. Thoroughbreds are one of the most common breeds for use in polo in the United States. They are often seen in the fox hunting field as well.

=== Crossbreeding ===
Thoroughbreds are often crossed with horses of other breeds to create new breeds or to enhance or introduce specific qualities into existing ones. They have been influential on many modern riding horse breeds, such as the American Quarter Horse, the Standardbred, and possibly the Morgan, a breed that went on to influence many of the gaited breeds in North America. Other common crosses with the Thoroughbred include crossbreeding with Arabian bloodlines to produce the Anglo-Arabian as well as with the Irish Draught to produce the Irish Sport Horse.

Thoroughbreds have been foundation bloodstock for various Warmblood breeds due to their refinement and performance capabilities. Crossbred horses developed from Thoroughbreds, (informally categorized as "hot bloods" because of temperament) crossed on sturdy draft horse breeds, (classified as "cold bloods" for their more phlegmatic temperament) are known as "warmbloods", which today are commonly seen in competitive events such as show jumping and dressage. Examples include the Dutch Warmblood, Hanoverian, and Selle Français. Some warmblood registries note the percentage of Thoroughbred breeding, and many warmblood breeds have an open stud book that continues to allow Thoroughbred crossbreeding.

== Health issues ==
Although Thoroughbreds are seen in the hunter-jumper world and in other disciplines, modern Thoroughbreds are primarily bred for speed, and racehorses have a very high rate of accidents as well as other health problems.

One tenth of all Thoroughbreds suffer orthopedic problems, including fractures. Current estimates indicate that there are 1.5 career-ending breakdowns for every 1,000 horses starting a race in the United States, an average of two horses per day. The state of California reported a particularly high rate of injury, 3.5 per 1000 starts. Other countries report lower rates of injury, with the United Kingdom having 0.9 injuries/1,000 starts (1990–1999) and the courses in Victoria, Australia, producing a rate of 0.44 injuries/1,000 starts (1989–2004). Thoroughbreds also have other health concerns, including a majority of animals who are prone to bleeding from the lungs (exercise induced pulmonary hemorrhage), 10% with low fertility, and 5% with abnormally small hearts. Thoroughbreds also tend to have smaller hooves relative to their body mass than other breeds, with thin soles and walls and a lack of cartilage mass, which contributes to foot soreness, the most common source of lameness in racehorses.

=== Selective breeding ===
One argument for the health issues involving Thoroughbreds suggests that inbreeding is the culprit. It has also been suggested that capability for speed is enhanced in an already swift animal by raising muscle mass, a form of selective breeding that has created animals designed to win horse races. Thus, according to one postulation, the modern Thoroughbred travels faster than its skeletal structure can support. Veterinarian Robert M. Miller states that "We have selectively bred for speeds that the anatomy of the horse cannot always cope with."

Poor breeding may be encouraged by the fact that many horses are sent to the breeding shed following an injury. If the injury is linked to a conformational fault, the fault is likely to be passed to the next generation. Additionally, some breeders will have a veterinarian perform straightening procedures on a horse with crooked legs. This can help increase the horse's price at a sale and perhaps help the horse have a sounder racing career, but the genes for poor legs will still be passed on.

=== Excess stress ===
A high accident rate may also occur because Thoroughbreds, particularly in the United States, are first raced as 2-year-olds, well before they are completely mature. Though they may appear full-grown and are in superb muscular condition, their bones are not fully formed. However, catastrophic injury rates are higher in 4- and 5-year-olds than in 2- and 3-year-olds. Some believe that correct, slow training of a young horse (including foals) may actually be beneficial to the overall soundness of the animal. This is because, during the training process, microfractures occur in the leg followed by bone remodeling. If the remodeling is given sufficient time to heal, the bone becomes stronger. If proper remodeling occurs before hard training and racing begins, the horse will have a stronger musculoskeletal system and will have a decreased chance of injury.

Studies have shown that track surfaces, horseshoes with toe grabs, use of certain legal medications, and high-intensity racing schedules may also contribute to a high injury rate. One promising trend is the development of synthetic surfaces for racetracks, and one of the first tracks to install such a surface, Turfway Park in Florence, Kentucky, saw its rate of fatal breakdowns drop from 24 in 2004–05 to three in the year following Polytrack installation. The material is not perfected, and some areas report problems related to winter weather, but studies are continuing.

=== Medical challenges ===
The level of treatment given to injured Thoroughbreds is often more intensive than for horses of lesser financial value but also controversial, due in part to the significant challenges in treating broken bones and other major leg injuries. Leg injuries that are not immediately fatal still may be life-threatening because a horse's weight must be distributed evenly on all four legs to prevent circulatory problems, laminitis, and other infections. If a horse loses the use of one leg temporarily, there is the risk that other legs will break down during the recovery period because they are carrying an abnormal weight load. While horses periodically lie down for brief periods of time, a horse cannot remain lying in the equivalent of a human's "bed rest" because of the risk of developing sores, internal damage, and congestion.

Whenever a racing accident severely injures a well-known horse, such as the major leg fractures that led to the euthanization of 2006 Kentucky Derby winner Barbaro, or 2008 Kentucky Derby runner-up Eight Belles, the animal rights group People for the Ethical Treatment of Animals have denounced the Thoroughbred racing industry. Conversely, advocates of racing argue that without horse racing, far less funding and incentives would be available for medical and biomechanical research on horses. Although horse racing is hazardous, veterinary science has advanced. Previously hopeless cases can now be treated, and earlier detection through advanced imaging techniques like scintigraphy can keep at-risk horses off the track.

== See also ==
- Thoroughbred breeding theories
- Glossary of North American horse racing
- Thoroughbred racing in Australia
- Thoroughbred racing in New Zealand
